= 2018 US Open – Men's singles qualifying =

Men's singles qualifying
- 2018 US Open

Events
Singles	men	women		boys	girls
Doubles	men	women	mixed	boys	girls
WC Singles	men	women	quad
WC Doubles	men	women	quad
Legends	men	women	mixed

Qualification
Singles	men	women
- US Open

== Seeds ==
1. (Slovakia) Jozef Kovalík (first round)
2. (Estonia) Jürgen Zopp (first round)
3. (Belarus) Ilya Ivashka (first round)
4. (Bolivia) Hugo Dellien (first round)
5. (Spain) Marcel Granollers (qualified)
6. (Poland) Hubert Hurkacz (qualified)
7. (Italy) Thomas Fabbiano (second round)
8. (Spain) Adrián Menéndez Maceiras (first round)
9. (Canada) Félix Auger-Aliassime (qualified)
10. (Italy) Lorenzo Sonego (qualifying competition, lucky loser)
11. (Brazil) Thiago Monteiro (second round)
12. (Canada) Peter Polansky (qualifying competition, lucky loser)
13. (Switzerland) Henri Laaksonen (first round)
14. (Argentina) Juan Ignacio Londero (first round)
15. (Germany) Yannick Maden (qualified)
16. (Sweden) Elias Ymer (first round)
17. (Belgium) Ruben Bemelmans (qualifying competition, lucky loser)
18. (Latvia) Ernests Gulbis (first round)
19. (France) Nicolas Mahut (qualifying competition, lucky loser)
20. (Austria) Gerald Melzer (qualifying competition)
21. (France) Stéphane Robert (first round)
22. (Croatia) Ivo Karlović (second round)
23. (Ukraine) Sergiy Stakhovsky (first round)
24. (France) Ugo Humbert (qualified)
25. (Austria) Dennis Novak (qualified)
26. (Italy) Stefano Travaglia (qualified)
27. (Argentina) Marco Trungelliti (qualifying competition)
28. (Norway) Casper Ruud (qualified)
29. (Italy) Simone Bolelli (second round)
30. (South Africa) Lloyd Harris (qualified)
31. (El Salvador) Marcelo Arévalo (second round)
32. (Portugal) Gastão Elias (first round)

== Qualifiers ==
1. (France) Ugo Humbert
2. (Italy) Stefano Travaglia
3. (Italy) Federico Gaio
4. (Norway) Casper Ruud
5. (Spain) Marcel Granollers
6. (Poland) Hubert Hurkacz
7. (South Africa) Lloyd Harris
8. (Austria) Dennis Novak
9. (Canada) Félix Auger-Aliassime
10. (United States) Collin Altamirano
11. (United States) Mitchell Krueger
12. (United States) Donald Young
13. (Spain) Tommy Robredo
14. (Argentina) Facundo Bagnis
15. (Germany) Yannick Maden
16. (Argentina) Carlos Berlocq

== Lucky losers ==
1. (Italy) Lorenzo Sonego
2. (Canada) Peter Polansky
3. (Belgium) Ruben Bemelmans
4. (France) Nicolas Mahut

== Qualifying draw ==
=== First qualifier ===
First round
1	(Slovakia) Jozef Kovalík	2	6	6^{4}
(United States) Ernesto Escobedo	6	3	7^{7}
(Australia) Marc Polmans	3	6	6
(Germany) Oscar Otte	6	4	1
(Croatia) Ante Pavić	6	4	6^{5}
WC	(United States) Brandon Nakashima	3	6	7^{7}
(Serbia) Peđa Krstin	6^{5}	6	6^{3}
24	(France) Ugo Humbert	7^{7}	4	7^{7}

Second round
(United States) Ernesto Escobedo	4	6	0
(Australia) Marc Polmans	6	3	6
WC	(United States) Brandon Nakashima	6^{4}	3
24	(France) Ugo Humbert	7^{7}	6

Qualifying competition
(Australia) Marc Polmans	5	2
24	(France) Ugo Humbert	7	6

=== Second qualifier ===
First round
2	(Estonia) Jürgen Zopp	3	1
(Dominican Republic) Víctor Estrella Burgos	6	6
(Dominican Republic) Roberto Cid Subervi	3	6^{4}
(United States) Bjorn Fratangelo	6	7^{7}
(United States) Evan King	6	3	6
(Chile) Christian Garín	3	6	2
(Italy) Matteo Donati	3	2
26	(Italy) Stefano Travaglia	6	6

Second round
(Dominican Republic) Víctor Estrella Burgos	7^{7}	6
(United States) Bjorn Fratangelo	6^{3}	3
(United States) Evan King	6	3	4
26	(Italy) Stefano Travaglia	4	6	6

Qualifying competition
(Dominican Republic) Víctor Estrella Burgos	4	0
26	(Italy) Stefano Travaglia	6	6

=== Third qualifier ===
First round
3	(Belarus) Ilya Ivashka	7	4	1
(Japan) Hiroki Moriya	5	6	6
(Italy) Federico Gaio	7^{7}	6
(Czech Republic) Lukáš Rosol	6^{5}	4
(Russia) Evgeny Karlovskiy	6	6
WC	(United States) Martin Redlicki	2	4
(Spain) Daniel Gimeno Traver	6	6^{2}	1
27	(Argentina) Marco Trungelliti	4	7^{7}	6

Second round
(Japan) Hiroki Moriya	4	3
(Italy) Federico Gaio	6	6
(Russia) Evgeny Karlovskiy	4	6^{2}
27	(Argentina) Marco Trungelliti	6	7^{7}

Qualifying competition
(Italy) Federico Gaio	6^{4}	6	7^{7}
27	(Argentina) Marco Trungelliti	7^{7}	3	6^{4}

=== Fourth qualifier ===
First round
4	(Bolivia) Hugo Dellien	1	6^{6}
(Colombia) Daniel Elahi Galán	6	7^{8}
(Germany) Daniel Brands	6	7^{7}
(Czech Republic) Václav Šafránek	4	6^{3}
(Slovenia) Blaž Rola	3	4
(Australia) Max Purcell	6	6
(Italy) Andrea Arnaboldi	2	2
28	(Norway) Casper Ruud	6	6

Second round
(Colombia) Daniel Elahi Galán	7	6
(Germany) Daniel Brands	5	2
(Australia) Max Purcell	6^{5}	5
28	(Norway) Casper Ruud	7^{7}	7

Qualifying competition
(Colombia) Daniel Elahi Galán	5	2
28	(Norway) Casper Ruud	7	6

=== Fifth qualifier ===
First round
5	(Spain) Marcel Granollers	7^{7}	6
(Canada) Filip Peliwo	6^{4}	2
(Poland) Kamil Majchrzak	2	6	6
(Czech Republic) Adam Pavlásek	6	1	3
(Serbia) Miomir Kecmanović	6^{3}	6	6
(United States) Reilly Opelka	7^{7}	4	4
(Serbia) Nikola Milojević	6	6
32	(Portugal) Gastão Elias	4	0

Second round
5	(Spain) Marcel Granollers	6	6
(Poland) Kamil Majchrzak	3	3
(Serbia) Miomir Kecmanović	2	6	4
(Serbia) Nikola Milojević	6	1	6

Qualifying competition
5	(Spain) Marcel Granollers	6	7^{7}
(Serbia) Nikola Milojević	0	6^{5}

=== Sixth qualifier ===
First round
6	(Poland) Hubert Hurkacz	6	6
(Australia) John-Patrick Smith	3	2
(Russia) Ivan Nedelko	4	4
PR	(Belarus) Egor Gerasimov	6	6
(Italy) Gianluigi Quinzi	3	4
(Spain) Pedro Martínez	6	6
(United States) Christian Harrison	3	6	6
18	(Latvia) Ernests Gulbis	6	2	4

Second round
6	(Poland) Hubert Hurkacz	7^{7}	6
PR	(Belarus) Egor Gerasimov	6^{5}	3
(Spain) Pedro Martínez	1	7^{7}	6
(United States) Christian Harrison	6	6^{5}	3

Qualifying competition
6	(Poland) Hubert Hurkacz	6	6
(Spain) Pedro Martínez	3	3

=== Seventh qualifier ===
First round
7	(Italy) Thomas Fabbiano	6	7
(Austria) Lucas Miedler	2	5
(Netherlands) Thiemo de Bakker	4	7^{7}	6^{5}
WC	(United States) JC Aragone	6	6^{3}	7^{7}
(Croatia) Nino Serdarušić	6	6^{5}	2
(Austria) Sebastian Ofner	3	7^{7}	6
(Ecuador) Roberto Quiroz	6^{5}	3
30	(South Africa) Lloyd Harris	7^{7}	6

Second round
7	(Italy) Thomas Fabbiano	5	1
WC	(United States) JC Aragone	7	6
(Austria) Sebastian Ofner	2	1
30	(South Africa) Lloyd Harris	6	6

Qualifying competition
WC	(United States) JC Aragone	4	2
30	(South Africa) Lloyd Harris	6	6

=== Eighth qualifier ===
First round
8	(Spain) Adrián Menéndez Maceiras	3	3
(Serbia) Danilo Petrović	6	6
(Italy) Salvatore Caruso	3	5
(Italy) Lorenzo Giustino	6	7
(Russia) Alexey Vatutin	6	3	6
WC	(United States) Tom Fawcett	4	6	1
(France) Quentin Halys	1	3
25	(Austria) Dennis Novak	6	6

Second round
(Serbia) Danilo Petrović	2	6	3
(Italy) Lorenzo Giustino	6	4	6
(Russia) Alexey Vatutin	0	4
25	(Austria) Dennis Novak	6	6

Qualifying competition
(Italy) Lorenzo Giustino	5	4
25	(Austria) Dennis Novak	7	6

=== Ninth qualifier ===
First round
9	(Canada) Félix Auger-Aliassime	7	6
(Netherlands) Tallon Griekspoor	5	3
(France) Antoine Hoang	4	6	5
(United States) Christopher Eubanks	6	4	7
PR	(Austria) Jürgen Melzer	6^{7}	2
(France) Kenny de Schepper	7^{9}	6
(Barbados) Darian King	5	6	3
20	(Austria) Gerald Melzer	7	4	6

Second round
9	(Canada) Félix Auger-Aliassime	7^{7}	6
(United States) Christopher Eubanks	6^{5}	2
(France) Kenny de Schepper	4	6	4
20	(Austria) Gerald Melzer	6	4	6

Qualifying competition
9	(Canada) Félix Auger-Aliassime	6	6
20	(Austria) Gerald Melzer	3	0

=== Tenth qualifier ===
First round
10	(Italy) Lorenzo Sonego	4	6	7^{8}
(Brazil) Rogério Dutra Silva	6	2	6^{6}
(Spain) Ricardo Ojeda Lara	4	3
(Brazil) Guilherme Clezar	6	6
(Bosnia and Herzegovina) Tomislav Brkić	2	0
WC	(United States) Collin Altamirano	6	6
PR	(Ukraine) Illya Marchenko	3	6^{7}
22	(Croatia) Ivo Karlović	6	7^{9}

Second round
10	(Italy) Lorenzo Sonego	7	5	6
(Brazil) Guilherme Clezar	5	7	3
WC	(United States) Collin Altamirano	7	6
22	(Croatia) Ivo Karlović	5	4

Qualifying competition
10	(Italy) Lorenzo Sonego	4	6^{3}
WC	(United States) Collin Altamirano	6	7^{7}

=== Eleventh qualifier ===
First round
11	(Brazil) Thiago Monteiro	7	6^{5}	6
(Japan) Tatsuma Ito	5	7^{7}	2
(France) Calvin Hemery	7^{7}	6
(Germany) Matthias Bachinger	6^{3}	3
(United States) Mitchell Krueger	6	6
(Japan) Go Soeda	3	3
WC	(United States) Thai-Son Kwiatkowski	6	3	6
23	(Ukraine) Sergiy Stakhovsky	4	6	1

Second round
11	(Brazil) Thiago Monteiro	6^{5}	3
(France) Calvin Hemery	7^{7}	6
(United States) Mitchell Krueger	3	7^{9}	7
WC	(United States) Thai-Son Kwiatkowski	6	6^{7}	5

Qualifying competition
(France) Calvin Hemery	6	5	2
(United States) Mitchell Krueger	3	7	6

=== Twelfth qualifier ===
First round
12	(Canada) Peter Polansky	6	6
(Spain) Sergio Gutiérrez Ferrol	4	4
PR	(Colombia) Santiago Giraldo	6	6
(Croatia) Viktor Galović	4	4
(Germany) Mats Moraing	2	6^{2}
(United States) Donald Young	6	7^{7}
(Austria) Maximilian Neuchrist	5	7	5
29	(Italy) Simone Bolelli	7	5	7

Second round
12	(Canada) Peter Polansky	7^{9}	6
PR	(Colombia) Santiago Giraldo	6^{7}	4
(United States) Donald Young	0	6	6
29	(Italy) Simone Bolelli	6	4	2

Qualifying competition
12	(Canada) Peter Polansky	5	6	3
(United States) Donald Young	7	1	6

=== Thirteenth qualifier ===
First round
13	(Switzerland) Henri Laaksonen	5	4
(Spain) Tommy Robredo	7	6
(Italy) Luca Vanni	6	5	3
(France) Grégoire Barrère	4	7	6
(Slovakia) Norbert Gombos	6	4	6
(Netherlands) Scott Griekspoor	4	6	3
(Czech Republic) Zdeněk Kolář	1	3
19	(France) Nicolas Mahut	6	6

Second round
(Spain) Tommy Robredo	6	6
(France) Grégoire Barrère	3	0
(Slovakia) Norbert Gombos	6	3	0
19	(France) Nicolas Mahut	4	6	6

Qualifying competition
(Spain) Tommy Robredo	6	2	6
19	(France) Nicolas Mahut	3	6	3

=== Fourteenth qualifier ===
First round
14	(Argentina) Juan Ignacio Londero	5	6^{7}
(Argentina) Facundo Bagnis	7	7^{9}
WC	(United States) Dennis Novikov	6	5	2
WC	(United States) Sebastian Korda	4	7	6
(Italy) Alessandro Giannessi	3	2
(France) Constant Lestienne	6	6
(United States) Kevin King	4	3
17	(Belgium) Ruben Bemelmans	6	6

Second round
(Argentina) Facundo Bagnis	6	6
WC	(United States) Sebastian Korda	4	4
(France) Constant Lestienne	4	3
17	(Belgium) Ruben Bemelmans	6	6

Qualifying competition
(Argentina) Facundo Bagnis	6	6^{2}	6
17	(Belgium) Ruben Bemelmans	3	7^{7}	2

=== Fifteenth qualifier ===
First round
15	(Germany) Yannick Maden	6	6
(Egypt) Mohamed Safwat	1	3
(Australia) Bernard Tomic	6	0	3
(Australia) Thanasi Kokkinakis	3	6	6
(Australia) Alex Bolt	6	7
(Italy) Stefano Napolitano	3	5
(Italy) Gian Marco Moroni	3	6	5
31	(El Salvador) Marcelo Arévalo	6	2	7

Second round
15	(Germany) Yannick Maden	7^{7}	6
(Australia) Thanasi Kokkinakis	6^{5}	4
(Australia) Alex Bolt	7	3	6
31	(El Salvador) Marcelo Arévalo	5	6	3

Qualifying competition
15	(Germany) Yannick Maden	6	6
(Australia) Alex Bolt	4	2

=== Sixteenth qualifier ===
First round
16	(Sweden) Elias Ymer	6^{2}	6	3
(Argentina) Carlos Berlocq	7^{7}	3	6
(Spain) Enrique López Pérez	6	6
WC	(United States) Ulises Blanch	3	2
(United Kingdom) Liam Broady	6	6
(United Kingdom) Jay Clarke	3	1
(Belarus) Uladzimir Ignatik	7	6
21	(France) Stéphane Robert	5	1

Second round
(Argentina) Carlos Berlocq	6	3	6
(Spain) Enrique López Pérez	3	6	1
(United Kingdom) Liam Broady	6	2	6^{3}
(Belarus) Uladzimir Ignatik	4	6	7^{7}

Qualifying competition
(Argentina) Carlos Berlocq	7^{7}	6
(Belarus) Uladzimir Ignatik	6^{3}	2
