= 2018 US Open – Women's singles qualifying =

Women's singles qualifying
- 2018 US Open

Events
Singles	men	women		boys	girls
Doubles	men	women	mixed	boys	girls
WC Singles	men	women	quad
WC Doubles	men	women	quad
Legends	men	women	mixed

Qualification
Singles	men	women
- US Open

== Seeds ==
1. (China) Zheng Saisai (first round)
2. (United Kingdom) Katie Boulter (first round)
3. (United States) Madison Brengle (qualifying competition, lucky loser)
4. (Switzerland) Viktorija Golubic (second round)
5. (Russia) Vitalia Diatchenko (first round)
6. (Serbia) Olga Danilović (second round)
7. (Netherlands) Arantxa Rus (qualified)
8. (Germany) Mona Barthel (qualifying competition, lucky loser)
9. (Tunisia) Ons Jabeur (qualified)
10. (United States) Nicole Gibbs (qualified)
11. (United Kingdom) Heather Watson (qualified)
12. (China) Zhu Lin (qualifying competition)
13. (United States) Varvara Lepchenko (second round)
14. (Poland) Magdalena Fręch (first round)
15. (Colombia) Mariana Duque Mariño (first round)
16. (Canada) Eugenie Bouchard (qualified)
17. (Japan) Nao Hibino (second round)
18. (Belgium) Ysaline Bonaventure (second round)
19. (Croatia) Jana Fett (qualifying competition)
20. (Russia) Veronika Kudermetova (second round)
21. (France) Fiona Ferro (second round)
22. (Brazil) Beatriz Haddad Maia (second round)
23. (Ukraine) Marta Kostyuk (second round)
24. (Russia) Vera Zvonareva (qualified)
25. (Russia) Anastasia Potapova (qualifying competition)
26. (Ukraine) Anhelina Kalinina (qualified)
27. (China) Liu Fangzhou (second round)
28. (Bulgaria) Viktoriya Tomova (first round)
29. (Romania) Irina Bara (first round)
30. (Romania) Alexandra Dulgheru (qualifying competition)
31. (Russia) Sofya Zhuk (qualifying competition)
32. (Russia) Anna Kalinskaya (qualified)

== Qualifiers ==
1. (Switzerland) Jil Teichmann
2. (Czech Republic) Marie Bouzková
3. (Russia) Anna Kalinskaya
4. (Israel) Julia Glushko
5. (Czech Republic) Karolína Muchová
6. (Ukraine) Anhelina Kalinina
7. (Netherlands) Arantxa Rus
8. (United States) Francesca Di Lorenzo
9. (Tunisia) Ons Jabeur
10. (United States) Nicole Gibbs
11. (United Kingdom) Heather Watson
12. (Russia) Vera Zvonareva
13. (Liechtenstein) Kathinka von Deichmann
14. (United States) Danielle Lao
15. (Switzerland) Patty Schnyder
16. (Canada) Eugenie Bouchard

== Lucky losers ==
1. (United States) Madison Brengle
2. (Germany) Mona Barthel

== Qualifying draw ==
=== First qualifier ===
First round
1	(China) Zheng Saisai	6^{1}	6	0
(Switzerland) Jil Teichmann	7^{7}	3	6
(France) Myrtille Georges	1	2
(Japan) Mayo Hibi	6	6
(Netherlands) Lesley Kerkhove	6	7
(South Korea) Jang Su-jeong	0	5
(United States) Victoria Duval	3	3
31	(Russia) Sofya Zhuk	6	6

Second round
(Switzerland) Jil Teichmann	6	6
(Japan) Mayo Hibi	4	4
(Netherlands) Lesley Kerkhove	5	6	2
31	(Russia) Sofya Zhuk	7	3	6

Qualifying competition
(Switzerland) Jil Teichmann	6	7
31	(Russia) Sofya Zhuk	1	5

=== Second qualifier ===
First round
2	(United Kingdom) Katie Boulter	4	6	1
(United Kingdom) Naomi Broady	6	4	6
(Spain) Georgina García Pérez	6	6
PR	(Germany) Anne Schäfer	3	3
WC	(United States) Ann Li	4	4
(Czech Republic) Marie Bouzková	6	6
(Russia) Valentyna Ivakhnenko	6	6^{6}	6^{4}
23	(Ukraine) Marta Kostyuk	4	7^{8}	7^{7}

Second round
(United Kingdom) Naomi Broady	4	6^{3}
(Spain) Georgina García Pérez	6	7^{7}
(Czech Republic) Marie Bouzková	6	7
23	(Ukraine) Marta Kostyuk	1	5

Qualifying competition
(Spain) Georgina García Pérez	2	7^{7}	2
(Czech Republic) Marie Bouzková	6	6^{4}	6

=== Third qualifier ===
First round
3	(United States) Madison Brengle	6	6
(United Kingdom) Gabriella Taylor	1	1
WC	(United States) Bethanie Mattek-Sands	5	6	1
(Czech Republic) Tereza Smitková	7	4	6
(Luxembourg) Mandy Minella	6	6
(Serbia) Dejana Radanović	1	3
(United States) Grace Min	2	2
32	(Russia) Anna Kalinskaya	6	6

Second round
3	(United States) Madison Brengle	6	6^{5}	6
(Czech Republic) Tereza Smitková	3	7^{7}	2
(Luxembourg) Mandy Minella	1	3
32	(Russia) Anna Kalinskaya	6	6

Qualifying competition
3	(United States) Madison Brengle	3	5
32	(Russia) Anna Kalinskaya	6	7

=== Fourth qualifier ===
First round
4	(Switzerland) Viktorija Golubic	6	7
WC	(United States) Ashley Kratzer	4	5
(Mexico) Renata Zarazúa	6	1	4
(Israel) Julia Glushko	4	6	6
PR	(Serbia) Bojana Jovanovski Petrović	6	6
(Australia) Destanee Aiava	4	4
(Italy) Martina Di Giuseppe	3	5
25	(Russia) Anastasia Potapova	6	7

Second round
4	(Switzerland) Viktorija Golubic	2	5
(Israel) Julia Glushko	6	7
PR	(Serbia) Bojana Jovanovski Petrović	6^{5}	3
25	(Russia) Anastasia Potapova	7^{7}	6

Qualifying competition
(Israel) Julia Glushko	7^{7}	6
25	(Russia) Anastasia Potapova	6^{5}	2

=== Fifth qualifier ===
First round
5	(Russia) Vitalia Diatchenko	1	7^{7}	1
(Czech Republic) Karolína Muchová	6	6^{2}	6
(China) Lu Jiajing	3	2
(Italy) Jasmine Paolini	6	6
(Canada) Françoise Abanda	1	6	6
(France) Jessika Ponchet	6	2	3
(Australia) Olivia Rogowska	6^{3}	1
22	(Brazil) Beatriz Haddad Maia	7^{7}	6

Second round
(Czech Republic) Karolína Muchová	7	6
(Italy) Jasmine Paolini	5	2
(Canada) Françoise Abanda	7^{7}	6
22	(Brazil) Beatriz Haddad Maia	6^{3}	3

Qualifying competition
(Czech Republic) Karolína Muchová	6	6
(Canada) Françoise Abanda	4	2

=== Sixth qualifier ===
First round
6	(Serbia) Olga Danilović	6	7
(Canada) Bianca Andreescu	3	5
(United Kingdom) Harriet Dart	2	5
(Australia) Jaimee Fourlis	6	7
PR	(Slovakia) Rebecca Šramková	4	2
(Czech Republic) Tereza Martincová	6	6
(Romania) Elena-Gabriela Ruse	1	6^{2}
26	(Ukraine) Anhelina Kalinina	6	7^{7}

Second round
6	(Serbia) Olga Danilović	6	6^{6}	2
(Australia) Jaimee Fourlis	4	7^{8}	6
(Czech Republic) Tereza Martincová	3	1
26	(Ukraine) Anhelina Kalinina	6	6

Qualifying competition
(Australia) Jaimee Fourlis	6	2	1
26	(Ukraine) Anhelina Kalinina	3	6	6

=== Seventh qualifier ===
First round
7	(Netherlands) Arantxa Rus	7^{7}	6
(Russia) Irina Khromacheva	6^{3}	3
(United States) Irina Falconi	5	3
(Kazakhstan) Elena Rybakina	7	6
(Serbia) Nina Stojanović	3	3
(Spain) Aliona Bolsova Zadoinov	6	6
(Turkey) Çağla Büyükakçay	3	6	4
27	(China) Liu Fangzhou	6	2	6

Second round
7	(Netherlands) Arantxa Rus	6	6
(Kazakhstan) Elena Rybakina	2	2
(Spain) Aliona Bolsova Zadoinov	6	6
27	(China) Liu Fangzhou	4	1

Qualifying competition
7	(Netherlands) Arantxa Rus	5	6	6
(Spain) Aliona Bolsova Zadoinov	7	0	2

=== Eighth qualifier ===
First round
8	(Germany) Mona Barthel	7	2	6
PR	(Czech Republic) Lucie Hradecká	5	6	1
(Greece) Valentini Grammatikopoulou	4	6^{5}
(Spain) Sílvia Soler Espinosa	6	7^{7}
(Paraguay) Verónica Cepede Royg	4	6^{6}
(United States) Francesca Di Lorenzo	6	7^{8}
(Germany) Antonia Lottner	6	6
28	(Bulgaria) Viktoriya Tomova	1	1

Second round
8	(Germany) Mona Barthel	4	7^{8}	6
(Spain) Sílvia Soler Espinosa	6	6^{6}	0
(United States) Francesca Di Lorenzo	6	7
(Germany) Antonia Lottner	4	5

Qualifying competition
8	(Germany) Mona Barthel	4	2
(United States) Francesca Di Lorenzo	6	6

=== Ninth qualifier ===
First round
9	(Tunisia) Ons Jabeur	6	6
(United Kingdom) Katy Dunne	2	1
(United States) Kristie Ahn	6	6
(Ukraine) Katarina Zavatska	4	3
(Spain) Paula Badosa Gibert	7^{7}	6
WC	(United States) Sophie Chang	6^{0}	3
(United States) Allie Kiick	2	6	2
30	(Romania) Alexandra Dulgheru	6	3	6

Second round
9	(Tunisia) Ons Jabeur	6	6
(United States) Kristie Ahn	1	2
(Spain) Paula Badosa Gibert	2	3
30	(Romania) Alexandra Dulgheru	6	6

Qualifying competition
9	(Tunisia) Ons Jabeur	6	7^{7}
30	(Romania) Alexandra Dulgheru	3	6^{4}

=== Tenth qualifier ===
First round
10	(United States) Nicole Gibbs	6	6
(Croatia) Tereza Mrdeža	1	1
(Israel) Deniz Khazaniuk	6	4	3
(Germany) Tamara Korpatsch	4	6	6
PR	(Belarus) Olga Govortsova	6	7
(Germany) Sabine Lisicki	4	5
(Bulgaria) Elitsa Kostova	1	7	4
21	(France) Fiona Ferro	6	5	6

Second round
10	(United States) Nicole Gibbs	6	7^{8}
(Germany) Tamara Korpatsch	4	6^{6}
PR	(Belarus) Olga Govortsova	4	6	6
21	(France) Fiona Ferro	6	4	4

Qualifying competition
10	(United States) Nicole Gibbs	6	6
PR	(Belarus) Olga Govortsova	4	1

=== Eleventh qualifier ===
First round
11	(United Kingdom) Heather Watson	6	6
WC	(United States) Coco Gauff	4	1
(Japan) Ayano Shimizu	4	6	6
(China) Han Xinyun	6	3	4
(United Kingdom) Katie Swan	3	6	6
(Italy) Deborah Chiesa	6	4	4
(Japan) Misaki Doi	4	3
17	(Japan) Nao Hibino	6	6

Second round
11	(United Kingdom) Heather Watson	6	6
(Japan) Ayano Shimizu	1	2
(United Kingdom) Katie Swan	6	6
17	(Japan) Nao Hibino	1	4

Qualifying competition
11	(United Kingdom) Heather Watson	6	6
(United Kingdom) Katie Swan	2	4

=== Twelfth qualifier ===
First round
12	(China) Zhu Lin	6	7
(Germany) Anna Zaja	4	5
(Montenegro) Danka Kovinić	2	4
(Italy) Jessica Pieri	6	6
(Hungary) Fanny Stollár	3	7^{7}	6
(Czech Republic) Barbora Krejčíková	6	6^{3}	3
(Romania) Jaqueline Cristian	3	1
24	(Russia) Vera Zvonareva	6	6

Second round
12	(China) Zhu Lin	2	6	6
(Italy) Jessica Pieri	6	2	1
(Hungary) Fanny Stollár	5	2
24	(Russia) Vera Zvonareva	7	6

Qualifying competition
12	(China) Zhu Lin	2	6	5
24	(Russia) Vera Zvonareva	6	4	7

=== Thirteenth qualifier ===
First round
13	(United States) Varvara Lepchenko	6	6
(United States) Katerina Stewart	2	1
(Italy) Martina Trevisan	6	2	6
(Bulgaria) Sesil Karatantcheva	3	6	4
(Liechtenstein) Kathinka von Deichmann	6	6
(Australia) Priscilla Hon	0	3
WC	(United States) Gail Brodsky	7	6
29	(Romania) Irina Bara	5	4

Second round
13	(United States) Varvara Lepchenko	2	6	5
(Italy) Martina Trevisan	6	1	7
(Liechtenstein) Kathinka von Deichmann	6	6
WC	(United States) Gail Brodsky	2	4

Qualifying competition
(Italy) Martina Trevisan	4	3
(Liechtenstein) Kathinka von Deichmann	6	6

=== Fourteenth qualifier ===
First round
14	(Poland) Magdalena Fręch	3	3
(United States) Danielle Lao	6	6
(France) Amandine Hesse	3	3
(Switzerland) Conny Perrin	6	6
(United States) Lauren Davis	7^{7}	5	3
PR	(North Macedonia) Lina Gjorcheska	6^{2}	7	6
(China) Zhang Yuxuan	4	6	3
19	(Croatia) Jana Fett	6	2	6

Second round
(United States) Danielle Lao	6	7
(Switzerland) Conny Perrin	4	5
PR	(North Macedonia) Lina Gjorcheska	3	6	3
19	(Croatia) Jana Fett	6	2	6

Qualifying competition
(United States) Danielle Lao	6	6
19	(Croatia) Jana Fett	4	4

=== Fifteenth qualifier ===
First round
15	(Colombia) Mariana Duque Mariño	5	5
(Australia) Arina Rodionova	7	7
WC	(United States) Jessica Pegula	6	6
WC	(United States) Kayla Day	3	1
(Switzerland) Patty Schnyder	5	6	6
(Belgium) Maryna Zanevska	7	2	4
(China) Lu Jingjing	5	3
20	(Russia) Veronika Kudermetova	7	6

Second round
(Australia) Arina Rodionova	3	1
WC	(United States) Jessica Pegula	6	6
(Switzerland) Patty Schnyder	6^{4}	6	6
20	(Russia) Veronika Kudermetova	7^{7}	1	4

Qualifying competition
WC	(United States) Jessica Pegula	3	2
(Switzerland) Patty Schnyder	6	6

=== Sixteenth qualifier ===
First round
16	(Canada) Eugenie Bouchard	6	6
(Canada) Carol Zhao	0	1
WC	(United States) Caty McNally	6	5	2
(Georgia (country)) Ekaterine Gorgodze	0	7	6
(Japan) Junri Namigata	3	0
(United States) Jamie Loeb	6	6
(Netherlands) Bibiane Schoofs	3	2
18	(Belgium) Ysaline Bonaventure	6	6

Second round
16	(Canada) Eugenie Bouchard	6	6
(Georgia (country)) Ekaterine Gorgodze	1	2
(United States) Jamie Loeb	6	6
18	(Belgium) Ysaline Bonaventure	4	4

Qualifying competition
16	(Canada) Eugenie Bouchard	6	6
(United States) Jamie Loeb	0	3
