= 2018 US Open – Boys' singles =

Boys' singles
- 2018 US Open

Final
- Champion: (Brazil) Thiago Seyboth Wild
- Runner-up: (Italy) Lorenzo Musetti
- Score: 6–1, 2–6, 6–2

Events
Singles	men	women		boys	girls
Doubles	men	women	mixed	boys	girls
WC Singles	men	women	quad
WC Doubles	men	women	quad
Legends	men	women	mixed
- US Open

Wu Yibing was the defending champion, but was no longer eligible to participate in junior tournaments.

Thiago Seyboth Wild won the title, defeating Lorenzo Musetti in the final, 6–1, 2–6, 6–2.

== Seeds ==
1. (Chinese Taipei) Tseng Chun-hsin (semifinals)
2. (Argentina) Sebastián Báez (second round)
3. (France) Hugo Gaston (third round)
4. (Colombia) Nicolás Mejía (third round)
5. (Kazakhstan) Timofei Skatov (second round)
6. (Brazil) Thiago Seyboth Wild (champion)
7. (Bulgaria) Adrian Andreev (first round, retired)
8. (Japan) Naoki Tajima (first round)
9. (Brazil) Gilbert Soares Klier Júnior (first round)
10. (Argentina) Facundo Díaz Acosta (first round)
11. (United States) Tristan Boyer (first round)
12. (China) Mu Tao (first round)
13. (Romania) Filip Cristian Jianu (first round)
14. (United States) Brandon Nakashima (quarterfinals)
15. (Spain) Carlos López Montagud (first round)
16. (Turkey) Yankı Erel (first round)

== Main draw ==
Key

- Q = Qualifier
- WC = Wild card
- LL = Lucky loser
- Alt = Alternate
- ITF = ITF entry
- PR = Protected ranking
- SR = Special ranking
- SE = Special exempt
- JE = Junior exempt
- JR = Junior Accelerator Programme entrant
- CO = College Accelerator Programme entrant
- NG = Next Gen Accelerator Program entrant
- w/o = Walkover
- r = Retired
- d = Defaulted

=== Finals ===
Quarterfinals
1	(Chinese Taipei) Tseng Chun-hsin	7^{7}	6
Q	(Italy) Giulio Zeppieri	6^{0}	2
SE	(Japan) Taisei Ichikawa	6^{3}	4
6	(Brazil) Thiago Seyboth Wild	7^{7}	6
WC	(United States) Jenson Brooksby	6	7
14	(United States) Brandon Nakashima	4	5
(Italy) Lorenzo Musetti	6	6
(Poland) Daniel Michalski	4	0

Semifinals
1	(Chinese Taipei) Tseng Chun-hsin	2	4
6	(Brazil) Thiago Seyboth Wild	6	6
WC	(United States) Jenson Brooksby	3	3
(Italy) Lorenzo Musetti	6	6

Final
6	(Brazil) Thiago Seyboth Wild	6	2	6
(Italy) Lorenzo Musetti	1	6	2

=== Top half ===
==== Section 1 ====
First round
1	(Chinese Taipei) Tseng Chun-hsin	6	6
WC	(United States) Toby Alex Kodat	2	0
(Spain) Nicolás Álvarez Varona	4	4
(South Africa) Philip Henning	6	6
(Czech Republic) Ondřej Štyler	4	4
SE	(United States) Emilio Nava	6	6
Q	(Poland) Wojciech Marek	6	7^{7}
13	(Romania) Filip Cristian Jianu	0	6^{5}
10	(Argentina) Facundo Díaz Acosta	6^{4}	6	5
Q	(Brazil) Mateus Alves	7^{7}	4	7
(Dominican Republic) Nick Hardt	6	7^{10}
WC	(United States) Govind Nanda	4	6^{8}
Q	(Italy) Giulio Zeppieri	6	6
(France) Harold Mayot	2	0
WC	(United States) Martin Damm	2	4
5	(Kazakhstan) Timofei Skatov	6	6

Second round
1	(Chinese Taipei) C-h Tseng	5	6	6
(South Africa) P Henning	7	1	0
SE	(United States) E Nava	3	5
Q	(Poland) W Marek	6	7
Q	(Brazil) M Alves	4	5
(Dominican Republic) N Hardt	6	7
Q	(Italy) G Zeppieri	6	6
5	(Kazakhstan) T Skatov	0	1

Third round
1	(Chinese Taipei) C-h Tseng	6	6
Q	(Poland) W Marek	2	3
(Dominican Republic) N Hardt	4	1
Q	(Italy) G Zeppieri	6	6

Quarterfinals
1	(Chinese Taipei) C-h Tseng	7^{7}	6
Q	(Italy) G Zeppieri	6^{0}	2

==== Section 2 ====
First round
4	(Colombia) Nicolás Mejía	7^{7}	6
Q	(United States) Eliot Spizzirri	6^{2}	2
(France) Clément Tabur	6	5	2
WC	(United States) Keenan Mayo	4	7	6
(United States) Andrew Fenty	6	2	3
SE	(Japan) Taisei Ichikawa	4	6	6
(Argentina) Thiago Agustín Tirante	7	1	6
16	(Turkey) Yankı Erel	5	6	3
11	(United States) Tristan Boyer	1	5
(Netherlands) Jesper de Jong	6	7
(United Kingdom) Aidan McHugh	7^{7}	6
Q	(Romania) Cristian Crețu	6^{2}	3
(Czech Republic) Jiří Lehečka	7^{8}	7
(Australia) Rinky Hijikata	6^{6}	5
WC	(United States) Zane Khan	7^{9}	1	3
6	(Brazil) Thiago Seyboth Wild	6^{7}	6	6

Second round
4	(Colombia) N Mejía	6	6
WC	(United States) K Mayo	3	3
SE	(Japan) T Ichikawa	6^{2}	7^{7}	6
(Argentina) TA Tirante	7^{7}	6^{0}	2
(Netherlands) J de Jong	4	1
(United Kingdom) A McHugh	6	6
(Czech Republic) J Lehečka	4	2
6	(Brazil) T Seyboth Wild	6	6

Third round
4	(Colombia) N Mejía	6	5	4
SE	(Japan) T Ichikawa	3	7	6
(United Kingdom) A McHugh	4	1
6	(Brazil) T Seyboth Wild	6	6

Quarterfinals
SE	(Japan) T Ichikawa	6^{3}	4
6	(Brazil) T Seyboth Wild	7^{7}	6

=== Bottom half ===
==== Section 3 ====
First round
8	(Japan) Naoki Tajima	1	3
(Czech Republic) Jonáš Forejtek	6	6
Q	(France) Valentin Royer	6	2	2
WC	(United States) Jenson Brooksby	4	6	6
Q	(Switzerland) Henry von der Schulenburg	6	4
(Netherlands) Deney Wassermann	3	3^{r}
(United States) Trey Hilderbrand	7^{7}	2	6
12	(China) Mu Tao	6^{5}	6	2
14	(United States) Brandon Nakashima	7^{7}	6
LL	(Germany) Henri Squire	6^{4}	4
(United Kingdom) Anton Matusevich	7	5	5
(Finland) Otto Virtanen	5	7	7
(Argentina) Juan Manuel Cerúndolo	6	6
(Switzerland) Damien Wenger	2	3
WC	(United States) Neel Rajesh	1	3
3	(France) Hugo Gaston	6	6

Second round
(Czech Republic) J Forejtek	1	2
WC	(United States) J Brooksby	6	6
Q	(Switzerland) H von der Schulenburg	6	6
(United States) T Hilderbrand	4	4
14	(United States) B Nakashima	6	6
(Finland) O Virtanen	3	4
(Argentina) JM Cerúndolo	2	1
3	(France) H Gaston	6	6

Third round
WC	(United States) J Brooksby	7	6
Q	(Switzerland) H von der Schulenburg	5	2
14	(United States) B Nakashima	6	6
3	(France) H Gaston	1	2

Quarterfinals
WC	(United States) J Brooksby	6	7
14	(United States) B Nakashima	4	5

==== Section 4 ====
First round
7	(Bulgaria) Adrian Andreev	3	2^{r}
(France) Arthur Cazaux	6	4
(Italy) Lorenzo Musetti	6	6
WC	(United States) Stefan Dostanic	4	0
(Belgium) Arnaud Bovy	6	7
Q	(United States) Axel Nefve	4	5
(United States) Cannon Kingsley	6	6
9	(Brazil) Gilbert Soares Klier Júnior	2	3
15	(Spain) Carlos López Montagud	2	4
(France) Antoine Cornut-Chauvinc	6	6
(Czech Republic) Dalibor Svrčina	6	3	6
(United States) Tyler Zink	3	6	2
(Poland) Daniel Michalski	1	6	7^{7}
(United States) Drew Baird	6	2	6^{5}
(Kazakhstan) Dostanbek Tashbulatov	3	5
2	(Argentina) Sebastián Báez	6	7

Second round
(France) A Cazaux	0	6	3
(Italy) L Musetti	6	3	6
(Belgium) A Bovy	1	7^{8}	4
(United States) C Kingsley	6	6^{6}	6
(France) A Cornut-Chauvinc	6	7
(Czech Republic) D Svrčina	4	5
(Poland) D Michalski	6	6
2	(Argentina) S Báez	4	4

Third round
(Italy) L Musetti	3	6	6
(United States) C Kingsley	6	3	0
(France) A Cornut-Chauvinc	6	2	4
(Poland) D Michalski	3	6	6

Quarterfinals
(Italy) L Musetti	6	6
(Poland) D Michalski	4	0

== Qualifying ==
=== Seeds ===
1. (France) Valentin Royer (qualified)
2. (Brazil) Mateus Alves (qualified)
3. (Poland) Wojciech Marek (qualified)
4. (Argentina) Alejo Lorenzo Lingua Lavallén (qualifying competition)
5. (Italy) Giulio Zeppieri (qualified)
6. (Croatia) Admir Kalender (first round)
7. (Uzbekistan) Sergey Fomin (first round)
8. (United Kingdom) Jacob Fearnley (qualifying competition)
9. (Switzerland) Henry von der Schulenburg (qualified)
10. (Italy) Matteo Arnaldi (first round)
11. (Romania) Cezar Crețu (qualified)
12. (Germany) Justin Schlageter (first round)
13. (Italy) Davide Tortora (first round)
14. (Germany) Henri Squire (qualifying competition, lucky loser)
15. (United States) Eliot Spizzirri (qualified)
16. (India) Siddhant Banthia (first round)

=== Qualifiers ===
1. (France) Valentin Royer
2. (Brazil) Mateus Alves
3. (Poland) Wojciech Marek
4. (Switzerland) Henry von der Schulenburg
5. (Italy) Giulio Zeppieri
6. (United States) Eliot Spizzirri
7. (United States) Axel Nefve
8. (Romania) Cezar Crețu

=== Lucky loser ===
1. (Germany) Henry Squire

=== Draw ===
==== First qualifier ====
First round
1	(France) Valentin Royer	7^{7}	6
(Estonia) Daniil Glinka	6^{5}	2
WC	(United States) Alexander Bernard	1	6	6
10	(Italy) Matteo Arnaldi	6	3	4

Qualifying competition
1	(France) Valentin Royer	6	6
WC	(United States) Alexander Bernard	4	2

==== Second qualifier ====
First round
2	(Brazil) Mateus Alves	3	7^{7}	6
(Italy) Filippo Moroni	6	6^{3}	4
WC	(United States) Eric Hahn	5	2
14	(Germany) Henri Squire	7	6

Qualifying competition
2	(Brazil) Mateus Alves	6	6
14	(Germany) Henri Squire	3	4

==== Third qualifier ====
First round
3	(Poland) Wojciech Marek	3	7	6
(India) Vikash Singh	6	5	3
WC	(United States) Alexander Lee	6	7
13	(Italy) Davide Tortora	1	5

Qualifying competition
3	(Poland) Wojciech Marek	6	6
WC	(United States) Alexander Lee	3	4

==== Fourth qualifier ====
First round
4	(Argentina) Alejo Lorenzo Lingua Lavallén	6	7
(United States) Ronan Jachuck	4	5
(United Kingdom) Harry Wendelken	3	6	3
9	(Switzerland) Henry von der Schulenburg	6	2	6

Qualifying competition
4	(Argentina) Alejo Lorenzo Lingua Lavallén	0	4
9	(Switzerland) Henry von der Schulenburg	6	6

==== Fifth qualifier ====
First round
5	(Italy) Giulio Zeppieri	6	6
WC	(United States) Niroop Vallabhaneni	1	1
(Poland) Filip Kolasiński	6	6^{2}	7
12	(Germany) Justin Schlageter	4	7^{7}	5

Qualifying competition
5	(Italy) Giulio Zeppieri	6	6
(Poland) Filip Kolasiński	1	0

==== Sixth qualifier ====
First round
6	(Croatia) Admir Kalender	6^{5}	5
(Brazil) Igor Gimenez	7^{7}	7
WC	(Japan) Hikaru Shiraishi	6^{2}	4
15	(United States) Eliot Spizzirri	7^{7}	6

Qualifying competition
(Brazil) Igor Gimenez	3	6	3
15	(United States) Eliot Spizzirri	6	3	6

==== Seventh qualifier ====
First round
7	(Uzbekistan) Sergey Fomin	6^{9}	6^{4}
(Sweden) Erik Grevelius	7^{11}	7^{7}
WC	(United States) Axel Nefve	6	6
16	(India) Siddhant Banthia	3	3

Qualifying competition
(Sweden) Erik Grevelius	3	2
WC	(United States) Axel Nefve	6	6

==== Eighth qualifier ====
First round
8	(United Kingdom) Jacob Fearnley	1	6	6
(Italy) Francesco Passaro	6	3	2
(Philippines) Arthur Craig Pantino	4	3
11	(Romania) Cezar Crețu	6	6

Qualifying competition
8	(United Kingdom) Jacob Fearnley	4	5
11	(Romania) Cezar Crețu	6	7
