= 2018 US Open – Boys' doubles =

Boys' doubles
- 2018 US Open

Final
- Champions: (Bulgaria) Adrian Andreev (United Kingdom) Anton Matusevich
- Runners-up: (United States) Emilio Nava (United States) Axel Nefve
- Score: 6–4, 2–6, [10–8]

Events
Singles	men	women		boys	girls
Doubles	men	women	mixed	boys	girls
WC Singles	men	women	quad
WC Doubles	men	women	quad
Legends	men	women	mixed
- US Open

Hsu Yu-hsiou and Wu Yibing were the defending champions, but both players were no longer eligible to participate in junior tournaments.

Adrian Andreev and Anton Matusevich won the title, defeating Emilio Nava and Axel Nefve in the final, 6–4, 2–6, [10–8].

== Seeds ==
1. (Brazil) Thiago Seyboth Wild / (Chinese Taipei) Tseng Chun-hsin (first round)
2. (Argentina) Sebastián Báez / (Argentina) Facundo Díaz Acosta (first round)
3. (France) Hugo Gaston / (France) Clément Tabur (second round)
4. (United Kingdom) Aidan McHugh / (Kazakhstan) Timofei Skatov (first round)
5. (Spain) Carlos López Montagud / (China) Mu Tao (first round)
6. (United States) Tristan Boyer / (Dominican Republic) Nick Hardt (second round)
7. (Czech Republic) Ondřej Štyler / (Japan) Naoki Tajima (first round)
8. (Romania) Filip Cristian Jianu / (Netherlands) Deney Wassermann (quarterfinals)

== Draw ==
Key

- Q = Qualifier
- WC = Wild card
- LL = Lucky loser
- Alt = Alternate
- ITF = ITF entry
- PR = Protected ranking
- SR = Special ranking
- SE = Special exempt
- JE = Junior exempt
- JR = Junior Accelerator Programme entrant
- CO = College Accelerator Programme entrant
- NG = Next Gen Accelerator Program entrant
- w/o = Walkover
- r = Retired
- d = Defaulted

=== Finals ===
Semifinals
(Italy) Lorenzo Musetti (Italy) Giulio Zeppieri	6	5	[6]
(Bulgaria) Adrian Andreev (United Kingdom) Anton Matusevich	4	7	[10]
(Netherlands) Jesper de Jong (Switzerland) Damien Wenger	6	4	[10]
(United States) Emilio Nava (United States) Axel Nefve	3	6	[12]

Final
(Bulgaria) Adrian Andreev (United Kingdom) Anton Matusevich	6	2	[10]
(United States) Emilio Nava (United States) Axel Nefve	4	6	[8]

=== Top half ===
First round
1	(Brazil) Thiago Seyboth Wild (Chinese Taipei) Tseng Chun-hsin	2	6	[6]
(Argentina) Juan Manuel Cerúndolo (Argentina) Alejo Lorenzo Lingua Lavallén	6	3	[10]
(France) Antoine Cornut-Chauvinc (France) Valentin Royer	3	5
(United States) Andrew Fenty (United States) Cannon Kingsley	6	7
(Czech Republic) Jonáš Forejtek (Czech Republic) Dalibor Svrčina	3	6	[4]
(Brazil) Mateus Alves (Argentina) Thiago Agustín Tirante	6	3	[10]
(Italy) Lorenzo Musetti (Italy) Giulio Zeppieri	6	7^{7}
5	(Spain) Carlos López Montagud (China) Mu Tao	3	6^{5}
4	(United Kingdom) Aidan McHugh (Kazakhstan) Timofei Skatov	6	5	[7]
(Australia) Rinky Hijikata (United States) Govind Nanda	2	7	[10]
(Bulgaria) Adrian Andreev (United Kingdom) Anton Matusevich	7^{7}	1	[10]
WC	(United States) Alexander Lee (United States) Niroop Vallabhaneni	6^{3}	6	[5]
(Romania) Cezar Crețu (Switzerland) Henry von der Schulenburg	2	6^{5}
WC	(United States) Adam Neff (United States) Eliot Spizzirri	6	7^{7}
Alt	(Germany) Justin Schlageter (Germany) Henri Squire	6	0	[5]
8	(Romania) Filip Cristian Jianu (Netherlands) Deney Wassermann	3	6	[10]

Second round
(Argentina) JM Cerúndolo (Argentina) AL Lingua Lavallén	7	2	[3]
(United States) A Fenty (United States) C Kingsley	5	6	[10]
(Brazil) M Alves (Argentina) TA Tirante	6^{4}	6	[4]
(Italy) L Musetti (Italy) G Zeppieri	7^{7}	4	[10]
(Australia) R Hijikata (United States) G Nanda	6^{5}	3
(Bulgaria) A Andreev (United Kingdom) A Matusevich	7^{7}	6
WC	(United States) A Neff (United States) E Spizzirri	6	6^{4}	[5]
8	(Romania) FC Jianu (Netherlands) D Wassermann	3	7^{7}	[10]

Quarterfinals
(United States) A Fenty (United States) C Kingsley	4	3
(Italy) L Musetti (Italy) G Zeppieri	6	6
(Bulgaria) A Andreev (United Kingdom) A Matusevich	6	6
8	(Romania) FC Jianu (Netherlands) D Wassermann	0	4

Semifinals
(Italy) L Musetti (Italy) G Zeppieri	6	5	[6]
(Bulgaria) A Andreev (United Kingdom) A Matusevich	4	7	[10]

=== Bottom half ===
First round
6	(United States) Tristan Boyer (Dominican Republic) Nick Hardt	7^{7}	6
(Turkey) Yankı Erel (Finland) Otto Virtanen	6^{5}	3
(United States) Drew Baird (United States) Trey Hilderbrand	7^{7}	6
(Colombia) Nicolás Mejía (United States) Tyler Zink	6^{5}	4
(Belgium) Arnaud Bovy (Czech Republic) Jiří Lehečka	1	4
(Netherlands) Jesper de Jong (Switzerland) Damien Wenger	6	6
WC	(United States) Jenson Brooksby (United States) Stefan Dostanic	4	2
3	(France) Hugo Gaston (France) Clément Tabur	6	6
7	(Czech Republic) Ondřej Štyler (Japan) Naoki Tajima	4	5
(Spain) Nicolás Álvarez Varona (Brazil) Gilbert Soares Klier Júnior	6	7
WC	(United States) Martin Damm (United States) Toby Alex Kodat	3	6	[9]
(Poland) Wojciech Marek (Poland) Daniel Michalski	6	3	[11]
(South Africa) Philip Henning (Kazakhstan) Dostanbek Tashbulatov	3	4
(France) Arthur Cazaux (France) Harold Mayot	6	6
(United States) Emilio Nava (United States) Axel Nefve	6	7^{8}
2	(Argentina) Sebastián Báez (Argentina) Facundo Díaz Acosta	3	6^{6}

Second round
6	(United States) T Boyer (Dominican Republic) N Hardt	6	3	[4]
(United States) D Baird (United States) T Hilderbrand	3	6	[10]
(Netherlands) J de Jong (Switzerland) D Wenger	6	7
3	(France) H Gaston (France) C Tabur	3	5
(Spain) N Álvarez Varona (Brazil) G Soares Klier Júnior	6	7
(Poland) W Marek (Poland) D Michalski	4	5
(France) A Cazaux (France) H Mayot	4	5
(United States) E Nava (United States) A Nefve	6	7

Quarterfinals
(United States) D Baird (United States) T Hilderbrand	7^{7}	1	[4]
(Netherlands) J de Jong (Switzerland) D Wenger	6^{3}	6	[10]
(Spain) N Álvarez Varona (Brazil) G Soares Klier Júnior	3	6	[4]
(United States) E Nava (United States) A Nefve	6	3	[10]

Semifinals
(Netherlands) J de Jong (Switzerland) D Wenger	6	4	[10]
(United States) E Nava (United States) A Nefve	3	6	[12]
