= 2018 US Open (tennis) =

- Date: August 27 – September 9
- Edition: 138th
- Category: Grand Slam (ITF)
- Draw: 128S/64D/32X
- Prize money: $53,000,000
- Surface: Hard
- Location: New York City, New York, United States
- Venue: USTA Billie Jean King National Tennis Center

Champions

Men's singles
- (Serbia) Novak Djokovic

Women's singles
- (Japan) Naomi Osaka

Men's doubles
- (United States) Mike Bryan / (United States) Jack Sock

Women's doubles
- (Australia) Ashleigh Barty / (United States) CoCo Vandeweghe

Mixed doubles
- (United States) Bethanie Mattek-Sands / (United Kingdom) Jamie Murray

Wheelchair men's singles
- (United Kingdom) Alfie Hewett

Wheelchair women's singles
- (Netherlands) Diede de Groot

Wheelchair quad singles
- (Australia) Dylan Alcott

Wheelchair men's doubles
- (United Kingdom) Alfie Hewett / (United Kingdom) Gordon Reid

Wheelchair women's doubles
- (Netherlands) Diede de Groot / (Japan) Yui Kamiji

Wheelchair quad doubles
- (United Kingdom) Andrew Lapthorne / (United States) David Wagner

Boys' singles
- (Brazil) Thiago Seyboth Wild

Girls' singles
- (China) Wang Xiyu

Boys' doubles
- (Bulgaria) Adrian Andreev / (United Kingdom) Anton Matusevich

Girls' doubles
- (United States) Coco Gauff / (United States) Caty McNally
- US Open

The 2018 US Open was the 138th edition of tennis' US Open and the fourth and final Grand Slam event of the year. It was held on outdoor hard courts at the USTA Billie Jean King National Tennis Center in New York City.

Rafael Nadal and Sloane Stephens were the defending champions in the men's and women's singles events, however both failed to defend their titles. Nadal retired during his semifinal match against Juan Martín del Potro. Stephens was defeated in the quarterfinals by Anastasija Sevastova, whom Stephens had beaten at the same stage the previous year.

Novak Djokovic won the men's singles title, defeating del Potro in the final, 6–3, 7–6^{(7–4)}, 6–3. It was his third US Open title and 14th Grand Slam, tying Pete Sampras' record to become equal third among all-time Grand Slam champions. In women's singles, Naomi Osaka defeated Serena Williams in the final, 6–2, 6–4, becoming Japan's first-ever able-bodied Grand Slam singles champion.

== Tournament ==
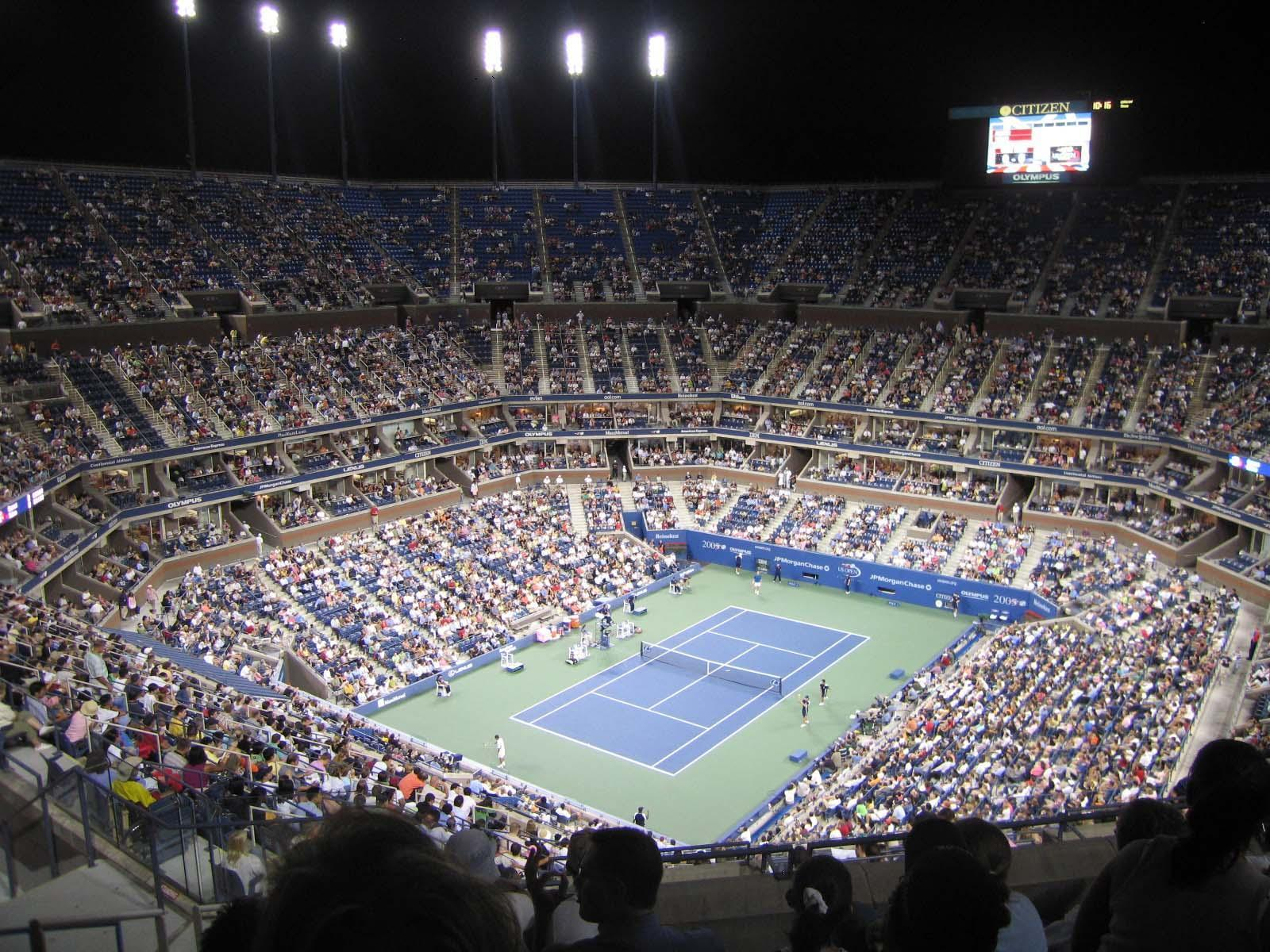
Arthur Ashe Stadium before the retractable roof was installed and where the finals of the US Open took place

The 2018 US Open was the 138th edition of the tournament and took place at the USTA Billie Jean King National Tennis Center in Flushing Meadows–Corona Park of Queens in New York City, New York, United States. The tournament was held on 17 DecoTurf hard courts.

The tournament was an event run by the International Tennis Federation (ITF) and was part of the 2018 ATP World Tour and the 2018 WTA Tour calendars under the Grand Slam category. The tournament consisted of both men's and women's singles and doubles draws as well as a mixed doubles event. There are also singles and doubles events for both boys and girls (players under 18), which are part of the Grade A category of tournaments. Additionally, there are singles and doubles wheelchair tennis events for men, women and quads.

The tournament was played on hard courts and takes place on a series of 17 courts with DecoTurf surface, including the three existing main showcourts – Arthur Ashe Stadium, the newly renovated Louis Armstrong Stadium, and the new Grandstand.

== Broadcast ==
In the United States, the 2018 US Open will be the fourth year in a row under an 11-year, $825 million contract with ESPN, in which the broadcaster holds exclusive rights to the entire tournament and the US Open Series. This means that the tournament is not available on broadcast television. This also makes ESPN the exclusive U.S. broadcaster for three of the four tennis majors.

== Point and prize money distribution ==
=== Point distribution ===
Below is a series of tables for each of the competitions showing the ranking points on offer for each event.

==== Senior ====
Event	W	F	SF	QF	Round of 16	Round of 32	Round of 64	Round of 128	Q	Q3	Q2	Q1
Men's singles	2000	1200	720	360	180	90	45	10	25	16	8	0
Men's doubles	2000	1200	720	360	180	90	0	—	—	—	—	—
Women's singles	2000	1300	780	430	240	130	70	10	40	30	20	2
Women's doubles	2000	1300	780	430	240	130	10	—	—	—	—	—

==== Wheelchair ====
Event	W	F	SF/3rd	QF/4th
Singles	800	500	375	100
Doubles	800	500	100	—
Quad singles	800	500	375	100
Quad doubles	800	100	—	—

Event	W	F	SF	QF	Round of 16	Round of 32	Q	Q3
Boys' singles	1000	600	370	200	100	45	30	20
Girls' singles	1000	600	370	200	100	45	30	20
Boys' doubles	750	450	275	150	75	—N/a	—N/a	—N/a
Girls' doubles	750	450	275	150	75	—N/a	—N/a	—N/a

=== Prize money ===
The total prize-money compensation for the 2018 US Open is $53 million, a more than 5% increase on the same total last year. Of that total, a record $3.8 million goes to both the men's and women's singles champions, which is increased by 2.7% from last year. This makes the US Open the most lucrative and highest paying tennis grand slam in the world, leapfrogging the French Open in total prize money fund. Prize money for the US Open qualifying tournament is also up 10.3%, to $3.2 million. The prize money for the wheelchair draw amounts to a total of US$350,000. The singles winners of the men and women draws receive US$31,200 and the winner of the quad singles receives US$23,400.

Event	W	F	SF	QF	Round of 16	Round of 32	Round of 64	Round of 128	Q3	Q2	Q1
Singles	$3,800,000	$1,850,000	$925,000	$475,000	$266,000	$156,000	$93,000	$54,000	$30,000	$16,000	$8,000
Doubles	$700,000	$350,000	$166,400	$85,275	$46,563	$27,876	$16,500	—N/a	—N/a	—N/a	—N/a
Mixed doubles	$155,000	$70,000	$30,000	$15,000	$10,000	$5,000	—N/a	—N/a	—N/a	—N/a	—N/a

== Notable stories ==
=== Women's singles final ===
Naomi Osaka defeated Serena Williams in the final, 6–2, 6–4. During the final, Williams received three code violations, the second coming with a point penalty and the third with a game penalty. The issue started during the second set when chair umpire Carlos Ramos cited Serena for a signal that was sent from her coach. Serena said she was unaware of the signal and verbally sparred with Ramos, saying "I don't cheat to win. I'd rather lose." After a mistake later in the second set, Serena smashed her racket into the court. This led to her second code violation, which Serena found out about upon attempting to serve and which increased the dispute between Serena and Ramos. At this point, referring to the first violation for coaching, Serena stated "You owe me an apology. I have never cheated in my life." During the change at the 3–4 mark, a further discussion between Serena and Ramos broke down leading Serena to call Ramos both "a liar" and "a thief" for issuing the point penalty. As both players were concluding the changeover and getting set, Ramos issued Serena her third code violation, this time for verbal abuse. This led to confusion from both players who did not appear to hear the announcement, which Ramos explained to both after summoning them over to his seat. At this point, US Open referee, Brian Earley, and WTA supervisor, Donna Kelso, were summoned to the court due to the dispute. A four-minute delay occurred due to a discussion between Serena, Earley, and Kelso regarding the issues. After the delay, Serena won the next game before Osaka won the set and match.

== Singles players ==
Men's singles

Champion		Runner-up	
(Serbia) Novak Djokovic [6]		(Argentina) Juan Martín del Potro [3]	
Semifinals out
(Spain) Rafael Nadal [1]		(Japan) Kei Nishikori [21]	
Quarterfinals out
(Austria) Dominic Thiem [9]	(United States) John Isner [11]	(Croatia) Marin Čilić [7]	(Australia) John Millman
4th round out
(Georgia (country)) Nikoloz Basilashvili	(South Africa) Kevin Anderson [5]	(Croatia) Borna Ćorić [20]	(Canada) Milos Raonic [25]
(Belgium) David Goffin [10]	(Germany) Philipp Kohlschreiber	(Portugal) João Sousa	(Switzerland) Roger Federer [2]
3rd round out
(Russia) Karen Khachanov [27]	(Argentina) Guido Pella	(United States) Taylor Fritz	(Canada) Denis Shapovalov [28]
(Spain) Fernando Verdasco [31]	(Russia) Daniil Medvedev	(Serbia) Dušan Lajović	(Switzerland) Stan Wawrinka (WC)
(Australia) Alex de Minaur	(Germany) Jan-Lennard Struff	(Argentina) Diego Schwartzman [13]	(Germany) Alexander Zverev [4]
(France) Richard Gasquet [26]	(France) Lucas Pouille [17]	(Kazakhstan) Mikhail Kukushkin	(Australia) Nick Kyrgios [30]
2nd round out
(Canada) Vasek Pospisil	(Italy) Lorenzo Sonego (LL)	(United States) Jack Sock [18]	(Italy) Paolo Lorenzi
(United States) Steve Johnson	(Australia) Jason Kubler (WC)	(Italy) Andreas Seppi	(France) Jérémy Chardy
(United States) Denis Kudla	(United Kingdom) Andy Murray (PR)	(Spain) Roberto Carballés Baena	(Greece) Stefanos Tsitsipas [15]
(Chile) Nicolás Jarry	(United Kingdom) Cameron Norrie	(France) Gilles Simon	(France) Ugo Humbert (Q)
(Poland) Hubert Hurkacz (Q)	(United States) Frances Tiafoe	(France) Julien Benneteau	(Netherlands) Robin Haase
(Spain) Jaume Munar	(France) Gaël Monfils	(Australia) Matthew Ebden	(France) Nicolas Mahut (LL)
(United States) Tennys Sandgren	(Serbia) Laslo Đere	(Cyprus) Marcos Baghdatis	(Spain) Pablo Carreño Busta [12]
(Italy) Fabio Fognini [14]	(South Korea) Chung Hyeon [23]	(France) Pierre-Hugues Herbert	(France) Benoît Paire
1st round out
(Spain) David Ferrer	(Slovakia) Lukáš Lacko	(Luxembourg) Gilles Müller	(Spain) Albert Ramos Viñolas
(Argentina) Guido Andreozzi	(Slovenia) Aljaž Bedene	(Norway) Casper Ruud (Q)	(United Kingdom) Kyle Edmund [16]
(Bosnia and Herzegovina) Mirza Bašić	(Uzbekistan) Denis Istomin	(Germany) Mischa Zverev	(Spain) Roberto Bautista Agut [19]
(Canada) Félix Auger-Aliassime (Q)	(United States) Sam Querrey	(Russia) Andrey Rublev	(United States) Ryan Harrison
(United States) Donald Young (Q)	(Italy) Matteo Berrettini	(Australia) James Duckworth (PR)	(Spain) Feliciano López
(Germany) Florian Mayer	(United States) Mitchell Krueger (Q)	(Russia) Evgeny Donskoy	(Spain) Tommy Robredo (Q)
(United States) Bradley Klahn (WC)	(Germany) Peter Gojowczyk	(Australia) Jordan Thompson	(Bosnia and Herzegovina) Damir Džumhur [24]
(Argentina) Carlos Berlocq (Q)	(South Africa) Lloyd Harris (Q)	(United States) Collin Altamirano (Q)	(Bulgaria) Grigor Dimitrov [8]
(Romania) Marius Copil	(Italy) Stefano Travaglia (Q)	(Japan) Taro Daniel	(France) Adrian Mannarino [29]
(Italy) Marco Cecchinato [22]	(United States) Tim Smyczek (WC)	(United States) Mackenzie McDonald	(Italy) Federico Gaio (Q)
(Argentina) Federico Delbonis	(Belgium) Ruben Bemelmans (LL)	(Argentina) Facundo Bagnis (Q)	(Germany) Maximilian Marterer
(Serbia) Filip Krajinović [32]	(Germany) Yannick Hanfmann	(France) Corentin Moutet (WC)	(Canada) Peter Polansky (LL)
(Hungary) Márton Fucsovics	(Serbia) Viktor Troicki	(Argentina) Leonardo Mayer	(Japan) Yūichi Sugita
(Germany) Yannick Maden (Q)	(Russia) Mikhail Youzhny	(Spain) Marcel Granollers (Q)	(Tunisia) Malek Jaziri
(United States) Michael Mmoh (WC)	(United States) Jenson Brooksby (WC)	(United States) Noah Rubin (WC)	(Lithuania) Ričardas Berankis
(Moldova) Radu Albot	(India) Yuki Bhambri	(Austria) Dennis Novak (Q)	(Japan) Yoshihito Nishioka (PR)

Women's singles

Champion		Runner-up	
(Japan) Naomi Osaka [20]		(United States) Serena Williams [17]	
Semifinals out
(Latvia) Anastasija Sevastova [19]		(United States) Madison Keys [14]	
Quarterfinals out
(Czech Republic) Karolína Plíšková [8]	(United States) Sloane Stephens [3]	(Spain) Carla Suárez Navarro [30]	(Ukraine) Lesia Tsurenko
4th round out
(Estonia) Kaia Kanepi	(Australia) Ashleigh Barty [18]	(Belgium) Elise Mertens [15]	(Ukraine) Elina Svitolina [7]
(Russia) Maria Sharapova [22]	(Slovakia) Dominika Cibulková [29]	(Belarus) Aryna Sabalenka [26]	(Czech Republic) Markéta Vondroušová
3rd round out
(Sweden) Rebecca Peterson	(United States) Venus Williams [16]	(Czech Republic) Karolína Muchová (Q)	(United States) Sofia Kenin
(Belarus) Victoria Azarenka (WC)	(Czech Republic) Barbora Strýcová [23]	(Russia) Ekaterina Makarova	(China) Wang Qiang
(France) Caroline Garcia [6]	(Latvia) Jeļena Ostapenko [10]	(Serbia) Aleksandra Krunić	(Germany) Angelique Kerber [4]
(Czech Republic) Petra Kvitová [5]	(Belarus) Aliaksandra Sasnovich	(Netherlands) Kiki Bertens [13]	(Czech Republic) Kateřina Siniaková
2nd round out
(Switzerland) Jil Teichmann (Q)	(United States) Vania King (PR)	(Germany) Carina Witthöft	(Italy) Camila Giorgi
(Spain) Garbiñe Muguruza [12]	(Czech Republic) Lucie Šafářová	(Greece) Maria Sakkari [31]	(Romania) Ana Bogdan
(Ukraine) Anhelina Kalinina (Q)	(Australia) Daria Gavrilova [25]	(Spain) Lara Arruabarrena	(Belarus) Vera Lapko
(Germany) Julia Görges [9]	(United States) Claire Liu (WC)	(Romania) Irina-Camelia Begu	(Germany) Tatjana Maria
(Puerto Rico) Monica Puig	(France) Kristina Mladenovic	(Romania) Sorana Cîrstea	(United States) Taylor Townsend
(United States) Bernarda Pera	(Belgium) Kirsten Flipkens	(Chinese Taipei) Hsieh Su-wei	(Sweden) Johanna Larsson
(China) Wang Yafan	(Russia) Vera Zvonareva (Q)	(Israel) Julia Glushko (Q)	(Russia) Daria Kasatkina [11]
(United States) Francesca Di Lorenzo (Q)	(Canada) Eugenie Bouchard (Q)	(Australia) Ajla Tomljanović	(Denmark) Caroline Wozniacki [2]
1st round out
(Romania) Simona Halep [1]	(Slovenia) Dalila Jakupović	(Russia) Natalia Vikhlyantseva	(Russia) Anastasia Pavlyuchenkova [27]
(Poland) Magda Linette	(United States) Caroline Dolehide	(United States) Whitney Osuigwe (WC)	(Russia) Svetlana Kuznetsova (WC)
(China) Zhang Shuai	(Ukraine) Dayana Yastremska	(Croatia) Petra Martić	(Tunisia) Ons Jabeur (Q)
(United States) Asia Muhammad (WC)	(United States) Madison Brengle (LL)	(Czech Republic) Marie Bouzková (Q)	(Kazakhstan) Zarina Diyas
(Russia) Evgeniya Rodina	(Liechtenstein) Kathinka von Deichmann (Q)	(Slovakia) Viktória Kužmová	(Spain) Sara Sorribes Tormo
(United States) Danielle Lao (Q)	(Ukraine) Kateryna Kozlova	(Ukraine) Kateryna Bondarenko	(Japan) Kurumi Nara
(Russia) Anna Kalinskaya (Q)	(United Kingdom) Heather Watson (Q)	(Slovenia) Polona Hercog	(Croatia) Donna Vekić
(Slovakia) Magdaléna Rybáriková [31]	(United States) Jennifer Brady	(Poland) Agnieszka Radwańska	(United States) Sachia Vickery
(United Kingdom) Johanna Konta	(Switzerland) Stefanie Vögele	(Slovenia) Tamara Zidanšek	(United States) Nicole Gibbs (Q)
(Switzerland) Patty Schnyder (Q)	(United States) Alison Riske	(United States) Amanda Anisimova (WC)	(Germany) Andrea Petkovic
(France) Pauline Parmentier	(Kazakhstan) Yulia Putintseva	(Switzerland) Timea Bacsinszky (PR)	(United States) CoCo Vandeweghe [24]
(Netherlands) Arantxa Rus (Q)	(Russia) Ekaterina Alexandrova	(France) Alizé Cornet	(Russia) Margarita Gasparyan (PR)
(Belgium) Yanina Wickmayer	(Slovakia) Anna Karolína Schmiedlová	(Russia) Anna Blinkova	(United States) Danielle Collins
(Germany) Laura Siegemund (PR)	(Romania) Monica Niculescu	(Switzerland) Belinda Bencic	(Hungary) Tímea Babos
(Czech Republic) Kristýna Plíšková	(United States) Christina McHale	(France) Harmony Tan (WC)	(Germany) Mona Barthel (LL)
(Estonia) Anett Kontaveit [28]	(Australia) Lizette Cabrera (WC)	(Belgium) Alison Van Uytvanck	(Australia) Samantha Stosur

== Singles seeds ==
The following are the seeded players and notable players who have withdrawn from the event. Seedings are based on ATP and WTA rankings as of August 20, 2018. Rank and points before are as of August 27, 2018.

=== Men's singles ===
Seed	Rank	Player	Points before	Points defending	Points won	Points after	Status
1	1	(Spain) Rafael Nadal	10,040	2,000	720	8,760	Semifinals retired against (Argentina) Juan Martín del Potro [3]
2	2	(Switzerland) Roger Federer	7,080	360	180	6,900	Fourth round lost to (Australia) John Millman
3	3	(Argentina) Juan Martín del Potro	5,500	720	1,200	5,980	Runner-up, lost to (Serbia) Novak Djokovic [6]
4	4	(Germany) Alexander Zverev	4,845	45	90	4,890	Third round lost to (Germany) Philipp Kohlschreiber
5	5	(South Africa) Kevin Anderson	4,615	1,200	180	3,595	Fourth round lost to (Austria) Dominic Thiem [9]
6	6	(Serbia) Novak Djokovic	4,445	0	2,000	6,445	Champion, defeated (Argentina) Juan Martín del Potro [3]
7	7	(Croatia) Marin Čilić	4,445	90	360	4,715	Quarterfinals lost to (Japan) Kei Nishikori [21]
8	8	(Bulgaria) Grigor Dimitrov	3,790	45	10	3,755	First round lost to (Switzerland) Stan Wawrinka [WC]
9	9	(Austria) Dominic Thiem	3,485	180	360	3,665	Quarterfinals lost to (Spain) Rafael Nadal [1]
10	10	(Belgium) David Goffin	3,435	180	180	3,435	Fourth round lost to (Croatia) Marin Čilić [7]
11	11	(United States) John Isner	3,200	90	360	3,470	Quarterfinals lost to (Argentina) Juan Martín del Potro [3]
12	12	(Spain) Pablo Carreño Busta	2,425	720	45	1,750	Second round retired against (Portugal) João Sousa
13	13	(Argentina) Diego Schwartzman	2,380	360	90	2,110	Third round lost to (Japan) Kei Nishikori [21]
14	14	(Italy) Fabio Fognini	2,190	10	45	2,225	Second round lost to (Australia) John Millman
15	15	(Greece) Stefanos Tsitsipas	2,042	(125)^{†}	45	1,962	Second round lost to (Russia) Daniil Medvedev
16	16	(United Kingdom) Kyle Edmund	1,935	90	10	1,855	First round lost to (Italy) Paolo Lorenzi
17	17	(France) Lucas Pouille	1,915	180	90	1,825	Third round lost to (Portugal) João Sousa
18	18	(United States) Jack Sock	1,815	10	45	1,850	Second round lost to (Georgia (country)) Nikoloz Basilashvili
19	22	(Spain) Roberto Bautista Agut	1,650	90	10	1,570	First round lost to (Australia) Jason Kubler [WC]
20	20	(Croatia) Borna Ćorić	1,735	90	180	1,825	Fourth round lost to (Argentina) Juan Martin del Potro [3]
21	19	(Japan) Kei Nishikori	1,755	0	720	2,475	Semifinals lost to (Serbia) Novak Djokovic [6]
22	21	(Italy) Marco Cecchinato	1,734	(48)^{†}	10	1,696	First round lost to (France) Julien Benneteau
23	23	(South Korea) Chung Hyeon	1,630	45	45	1,630	Second round lost to (Kazakhstan) Mikhail Kukushkin
24	27	(Bosnia and Herzegovina) Damir Džumhur	1,475	90	10	1,395	First round lost to (Serbia) Dušan Lajović
25	24	(Canada) Milos Raonic	1,575	0	180	1,755	Fourth round lost to (United States) John Isner [11]
26	25	(France) Richard Gasquet	1,535	10	90	1,615	Third round lost to (Serbia) Novak Djokovic [6]
27	26	(Russia) Karen Khachanov	1,525	10	90	1,605	Third round lost to (Spain) Rafael Nadal [1]
28	28	(Canada) Denis Shapovalov	1,385	205	90	1,270	Third round lost to (South Africa) Kevin Anderson [5]
29	29	(France) Adrian Mannarino	1,365	90	10	1,285	First round lost to (United States) Frances Tiafoe
30	30	(Australia) Nick Kyrgios	1,345	10	90	1,425	Third round lost to (Switzerland) Roger Federer [2]
31	32	(Spain) Fernando Verdasco	1,330	45	90	1,375	Third round lost to (Argentina) Juan Martín del Potro [3]
32	33	(Serbia) Filip Krajinović	1,314	(29)+(33)^{†}	10+20	1,282	First round retired against (Australia) Matthew Ebden

†The player did not qualify for the tournament in 2017, but is defending points from one or more 2017 ATP Challenger Tour tournaments.

=== Women's singles ===
Seed	Rank	Player	Points before	Points defending	Points won	Points after	Status
1	1	(Romania) Simona Halep	8,061	10	10	8,061	First round lost to (Estonia) Kaia Kanepi
2	2	(Denmark) Caroline Wozniacki	5,975	70	70	5,975	Second round lost to (Ukraine) Lesia Tsurenko
3	3	(United States) Sloane Stephens	5,482	2,000	430	3,912	Quarterfinals lost to (Latvia) Anastasija Sevastova [19]
4	4	(Germany) Angelique Kerber	5,305	10	130	5,425	Third round lost to (Slovakia) Dominika Cibulková [29]
5	5	(Czech Republic) Petra Kvitová	4,885	430	130	4,585	Third round lost to (Belarus) Aryna Sabalenka [26]
6	6	(France) Caroline Garcia	4,725	130	130	4,725	Third round lost to (Spain) Carla Suárez Navarro [30]
7	7	(Ukraine) Elina Svitolina	4,555	240	240	4,555	Fourth round lost to (Latvia) Anastasija Sevastova [19]
8	8	(Czech Republic) Karolína Plíšková	4,105	430	430	4,105	Quarterfinals lost to (United States) Serena Williams [17]
9	9	(Germany) Julia Görges	3,900	240	70	3,730	Second round lost to (Russia) Ekaterina Makarova
10	10	(Latvia) Jeļena Ostapenko	3,787	130	130	3,787	Third round lost to (Russia) Maria Sharapova [22]
11	11	(Russia) Daria Kasatkina	3,525	240	70	3,355	Second round lost to (Belarus) Aliaksandra Sasnovich
12	12	(Spain) Garbiñe Muguruza	3,500	240	70	3,330	Second round lost to (Czech Republic) Karolína Muchová [Q]
13	13	(Netherlands) Kiki Bertens	3,260	10	130	3,380	Third round lost to (Czech Republic) Markéta Vondroušová
14	14	(United States) Madison Keys	3,212	1,300	780	2,692	Semifinals lost to (Japan) Naomi Osaka [20]
15	15	(Belgium) Elise Mertens	2,940	10	240	3,170	Fourth round lost to (United States) Sloane Stephens [3]
16	16	(United States) Venus Williams	2,841	780	130	2,191	Third round lost to (United States) Serena Williams [17]
17^{†}	26	(United States) Serena Williams	1,676	0	1,300	2,976	Runner-up, lost to (Japan) Naomi Osaka [20]
18	17	(Australia) Ashleigh Barty	2,740	130	240	2,850	Fourth round lost to (Czech Republic) Karolína Plíšková [8]
19	18	(Latvia) Anastasija Sevastova	2,250	430	780	2,600	Semifinals lost to (United States) Serena Williams [17]
20	19	(Japan) Naomi Osaka	2,245	130	2,000	4,115	Champion, defeated (United States) Serena Williams [17]
~~21~~	~~21~~	~~(Romania) Mihaela Buzărnescu~~	2,068	40	0	2,028	Withdrew due to right ankle injury
22	22	(Russia) Maria Sharapova	2,003	240	240	2,003	Fourth round lost to (Spain) Carla Suárez Navarro [30]
23	23	(Czech Republic) Barbora Strýcová	1,930	70	130	1,990	Third round lost to (Belgium) Elise Mertens [15]
24	25	(United States) CoCo Vandeweghe	1,878	780	10	1,108	First round lost to (Belgium) Kirsten Flipkens
25	32	(Australia) Daria Gavrilova	1,435	70	70	1,435	Second round lost to (Belarus) Victoria Azarenka [WC]
26	20	(Belarus) Aryna Sabalenka	2,140	(60)^{‡}	240	2,320	Fourth round lost to (Japan) Naomi Osaka [20]
27	28	(Russia) Anastasia Pavlyuchenkova	1,585	10	10	1,585	First round lost to (Sweden) Rebecca Peterson
28	27	(Estonia) Anett Kontaveit	1,665	10	10	1,665	First round lost to (Czech Republic) Kateřina Siniaková
29	35	(Slovakia) Dominika Cibulková	1,390	70	240	1,560	Fourth round lost to (United States) Madison Keys [14]
30	24	(Spain) Carla Suárez Navarro	1,879	240	430	2,069	Quarterfinals lost to (United States) Madison Keys [14]
31	29	(Slovakia) Magdaléna Rybáriková	1,540	130	10	1,420	First round lost to (China) Wang Qiang
32	30	(Greece) Maria Sakkari	1,514	130	70	1,454	Second round lost to (United States) Sofia Kenin

† Serena Williams was ranked 26 on the day when seeds were announced. Nevertheless, she was deemed a special case and seeded 17th by the organizers because she missed a significant portion of the last 12-month period due to pregnancy and maternity.
‡ The player did not qualify for the tournament in 2017. Accordingly, points for her 16th best result are deducted instead.

== Doubles seeds ==
=== Men's doubles ===
Team		Rank^{1}	Seed
(Austria) Oliver Marach	(Croatia) Mate Pavić	5	1
(Finland) Henri Kontinen	(Australia) John Peers	9	2
(United States) Mike Bryan	(United States) Jack Sock	13	3
(United Kingdom) Jamie Murray	(Brazil) Bruno Soares	15	4
(Colombia) Juan Sebastián Cabal	(Colombia) Robert Farah	21	5
(Netherlands) Jean-Julien Rojer	(Romania) Horia Tecău	24	6
(Poland) Łukasz Kubot	(Brazil) Marcelo Melo	27	7
(South Africa) Raven Klaasen	(New Zealand) Michael Venus	36	8
(France) Pierre-Hugues Herbert	(France) Nicolas Mahut	42	9
(Spain) Feliciano López	(Spain) Marc López	44	10
(Croatia) Ivan Dodig	(Spain) Marcel Granollers	51	11
(Japan) Ben McLachlan	(Germany) Jan-Lennard Struff	53	12
(Chile) Julio Peralta	(Argentina) Horacio Zeballos	63	13
(Netherlands) Robin Haase	(Netherlands) Matwé Middelkoop	63	14
(India) Rohan Bopanna	(France) Édouard Roger-Vasselin	64	15
(United Kingdom) Dominic Inglot	(Croatia) Franko Škugor	66	16

^{1}Rankings as of August 20, 2018.

=== Women's doubles ===
Team		Rank^{1}	Seed
(Czech Republic) Barbora Krejčíková	(Czech Republic) Kateřina Siniaková	7	1
(Hungary) Tímea Babos	(France) Kristina Mladenovic	9	2
(Czech Republic) Andrea Sestini Hlaváčková	(Czech Republic) Barbora Strýcová	17	3
(Canada) Gabriela Dabrowski	(China) Xu Yifan	21	4
(Slovenia) Andreja Klepač	(Spain) María José Martínez Sánchez	28	5
(Czech Republic) Lucie Hradecká	(Russia) Ekaterina Makarova	32	6
(Belgium) Elise Mertens	(Netherlands) Demi Schuurs	32	7
(United States) Nicole Melichar	(Czech Republic) Květa Peschke	33	8
(Netherlands) Kiki Bertens	(Sweden) Johanna Larsson	39	9
(Chinese Taipei) Chan Hao-ching	(China) Yang Zhaoxuan	43	10
(United States) Vania King	(Slovenia) Katarina Srebotnik	64	11
(Poland) Alicja Rosolska	(United States) Abigail Spears	64	12
(Australia) Ashleigh Barty	(United States) CoCo Vandeweghe	66	13
(United States) Raquel Atawo	(Germany) Anna-Lena Grönefeld	66	14
(Romania) Irina-Camelia Begu	(Romania) Monica Niculescu	70	15
(Japan) Miyu Kato	(Japan) Makoto Ninomiya	81	16

^{1}Rankings as of August 20, 2018.

=== Mixed doubles ===
Team		Rank^{1}	Seed
(Canada) Gabriela Dabrowski	(Croatia) Mate Pavić	12	1
(United States) Nicole Melichar	(Austria) Oliver Marach	19	2
(Chinese Taipei) Chan Hao-ching	(Finland) Henri Kontinen	28	3
(Chinese Taipei) Latisha Chan	(Croatia) Ivan Dodig	29	4
(Czech Republic) Andrea Sestini Hlaváčková	(France) Édouard Roger-Vasselin	34	5
(Netherlands) Demi Schuurs	(Netherlands) Matwé Middelkoop	41	6
(Slovenia) Katarina Srebotnik	(New Zealand) Michael Venus	41	7
(United States) Abigail Spears	(Colombia) Juan Sebastián Cabal	43	8

^{1}Rankings as of August 20, 2018.

== Events ==
=== Men's singles ===
- (Serbia) Novak Djokovic def. (Argentina) Juan Martín del Potro, 6–3, 7–6^{(7–4)}, 6–3

=== Women's singles ===
- (Japan) Naomi Osaka def. (United States) Serena Williams, 6–2, 6–4

=== Men's doubles ===
- (United States) Mike Bryan / (United States) Jack Sock def. (Poland) Łukasz Kubot / (Brazil) Marcelo Melo, 6–3, 6–1

=== Women's doubles ===
- (Australia) Ashleigh Barty / (United States) CoCo Vandeweghe def. (Hungary) Tímea Babos / (France) Kristina Mladenovic, 3–6, 7–6^{(7–2)}, 7–6^{(8–6)}

=== Mixed doubles ===
- (United States) Bethanie Mattek-Sands / (United Kingdom) Jamie Murray def. (Poland) Alicja Rosolska / (Croatia) Nikola Mektić, 2–6, 6–3, [11–9]

=== Junior boys' singles ===
- (Brazil) Thiago Seyboth Wild def. (Italy) Lorenzo Musetti, 6–1, 2–6, 6–2

=== Junior girls' singles ===
- (China) Wang Xiyu def. (France) Clara Burel, 7–6^{(7–4)}, 6–2

=== Junior boys' doubles ===
- (Bulgaria) Adrian Andreev / (United Kingdom) Anton Matusevich def. (United States) Emilio Nava / (United States) Axel Nefve, 6–4, 2–6, [10–8]

=== Junior girls' doubles ===
- (United States) Coco Gauff / (United States) Caty McNally def. (United States) Hailey Baptiste / (United States) Dalayna Hewitt, 6–3, 6–2

=== Wheelchair men's singles ===
- (United Kingdom) Alfie Hewett def. (Japan) Shingo Kunieda, 6–3, 7–5.

=== Wheelchair women's singles ===
- (Netherlands) Diede de Groot def. (Japan) Yui Kamiji, 6–2, 6–3

=== Wheelchair quad singles ===
- (Australia) Dylan Alcott def. (United States) David Wagner, 7–5, 6–2

=== Wheelchair men's doubles ===
- (United Kingdom) Alfie Hewett / (United Kingdom) Gordon Reid def. (France) Stéphane Houdet / (France) Nicolas Peifer, 5–7, 6–3, [11–9]

=== Wheelchair women's doubles ===
- (Netherlands) Diede de Groot / (Japan) Yui Kamiji def. (Netherlands) Marjolein Buis / (Netherlands) Aniek van Koot, 6–3, 6–4

=== Wheelchair quad doubles ===
- (United Kingdom) Andrew Lapthorne / (United States) David Wagner def. (Australia) Dylan Alcott / (United States) Bryan Barten, 3–6, 6–0, [10–4]

== Wild card entries ==
The following players were given wildcards to the main draw based on internal selection and recent performances.

=== Men's singles ===
- (United States) Jenson Brooksby (Note: Winner of the USTA Boys' under-18 national tournament)
- (United States) Bradley Klahn (Note: Winner of the Men's USTA Wild Card Challenge)
- (Australia) Jason Kubler (Note: Recipient of the USTA's Grand Slam Reciprocal Wildcard Agreement with the Tennis Australia)
- (United States) Michael Mmoh
- (France) Corentin Moutet (Note: Recipient of the USTA's Grand Slam Reciprocal Wildcard Agreement with the French Tennis Federation)
- (United States) Noah Rubin
- (United States) Tim Smyczek
- (Switzerland) Stan Wawrinka

=== Women's singles ===
- (United States) Amanda Anisimova
- (Belarus) Victoria Azarenka
- (Australia) Lizette Cabrera (Note: Recipient of the USTA's Grand Slam Reciprocal Wildcard Agreement with the Tennis Australia)
- (Russia) Svetlana Kuznetsova
- (United States) Claire Liu
- (United States) Asia Muhammad (Note: Winner of the Women's USTA Wild Card Challenge)
- (United States) Whitney Osuigwe (Note: Winner of the USTA Girls' under-18 national tournament)
- (France) Harmony Tan

=== Men's doubles ===
- (United States) Christopher Eubanks / (United States) Donald Young
- (United States) Christian Harrison / (United States) Ryan Harrison
- (United States) Evan King / (United States) Nathan Pasha
- (United States) Kevin King / (United States) Reilly Opelka
- (United States) Bradley Klahn / (Canada) Daniel Nestor
- (United States) Patrick Kypson / (United States) Danny Thomas
- (United States) Martin Redlicki / (United States) Evan Zhu

=== Women's doubles ===
- (United States) Jennifer Brady / (United States) Asia Muhammad
- (United States) Caroline Dolehide / (United States) Christina McHale
- (United States) Nicole Gibbs / (United States) Sabrina Santamaria
- (United States) Sofia Kenin / (United States) Sachia Vickery
- (United States) Allie Kiick / (United States) Jamie Loeb
- (United States) Varvara Lepchenko / (United States) Bernarda Pera
- (United States) Caty McNally / (United States) Whitney Osuigwe

=== Mixed doubles ===
- (United States) Amanda Anisimova / (United States) Michael Mmoh
- (United States) Kaitlyn Christian / (United States) James Cerretani
- (United States) Danielle Collins / (United States) Tom Fawcett
- (United States) Coco Gauff / (United States) Christopher Eubanks
- (United States) Jamie Loeb / (United States) Noah Rubin
- (United States) Christina McHale / (United States) Christian Harrison
- (United States) Whitney Osuigwe / (United States) Frances Tiafoe
- (United States) Taylor Townsend / (United States) Donald Young

== Qualifier entries ==
The qualifying competitions took place at USTA Billie Jean King National Tennis Center on August 21–24, 2018.

=== Men's singles ===
1. (France) Ugo Humbert
2. (Italy) Stefano Travaglia
3. (Italy) Federico Gaio
4. (Norway) Casper Ruud
5. (Spain) Marcel Granollers
6. (Poland) Hubert Hurkacz
7. (South Africa) Lloyd Harris
8. (Austria) Dennis Novak
9. (Canada) Félix Auger-Aliassime
10. (United States) Collin Altamirano
11. (United States) Mitchell Krueger
12. (United States) Donald Young
13. (Spain) Tommy Robredo
14. (Argentina) Facundo Bagnis
15. (Germany) Yannick Maden
16. (Argentina) Carlos Berlocq

==== Lucky losers ====
1. (Italy) Lorenzo Sonego
2. (Canada) Peter Polansky
3. (Belgium) Ruben Bemelmans
4. (France) Nicolas Mahut

=== Women's singles ===
1. (Switzerland) Jil Teichmann
2. (Czech Republic) Marie Bouzková
3. (Russia) Anna Kalinskaya
4. (Israel) Julia Glushko
5. (Czech Republic) Karolína Muchová
6. (Ukraine) Anhelina Kalinina
7. (Netherlands) Arantxa Rus
8. (United States) Francesca Di Lorenzo
9. (Tunisia) Ons Jabeur
10. (United States) Nicole Gibbs
11. (United Kingdom) Heather Watson
12. (Russia) Vera Zvonareva
13. (Liechtenstein) Kathinka von Deichmann
14. (United States) Danielle Lao
15. (Switzerland) Patty Schnyder
16. (Canada) Eugenie Bouchard

==== Lucky losers ====
1. (United States) Madison Brengle
2. (Germany) Mona Barthel

== Protected ranking ==
The following players were accepted directly into the main draw using a protected ranking:

Men's singles

- (United Kingdom) Andy Murray (2)
- (Japan) Yoshihito Nishioka (66)
- (Australia) James Duckworth (105)

Women's singles

- (Switzerland) Timea Bacsinszky (23)
- (Germany) Laura Siegemund (32)
- (Russia) Margarita Gasparyan (62)
- (United States) Vania King (103)

== Withdrawals ==
The following players were accepted directly into the main tournament, but withdrew with injuries, suspensions or for personal reasons.

Men's singles

- ‡ (Czech Republic) Tomáš Berdych (59) → replaced by (Serbia) Viktor Troicki (102)
- ‡ (Germany) Cedrik-Marcel Stebe (95 PR) → replaced by (Argentina) Guido Andreozzi (104)
- ‡ (Ukraine) Alexandr Dolgopolov (63) → replaced by (Russia) Mikhail Youzhny (105)
- ‡ (France) Jo-Wilfried Tsonga (64) → replaced by (Australia) James Duckworth (105 PR)
- § (Uruguay) Pablo Cuevas (74) → replaced by (Canada) Peter Polansky (LL)
- § (United States) Jared Donaldson (60) → replaced by (Italy) Lorenzo Sonego (LL)
- § (Spain) Guillermo García López (62) → replaced by (Belgium) Ruben Bemelmans (LL)
- § (Czech Republic) Jiří Veselý (73) → replaced by (France) Nicolas Mahut (LL)

Women's singles

- ‡ (Croatia) Mirjana Lučić-Baroni (67 PR) → replaced by (United States) Caroline Dolehide (102)
- ‡ (China) Peng Shuai (52) → replaced by (Russia) Natalia Vikhlyantseva (103)
- ‡ (United States) Catherine Bellis (84) → replaced by (United States) Vania King (103 PR)
- ‡ (Russia) Elena Vesnina (55) → replaced by (Czech Republic) Markéta Vondroušová (104)
- § (Thailand) Luksika Kumkhum (87) → replaced by (United States) Madison Brengle (LL)
- § (Romania) Mihaela Buzărnescu (24) → replaced by (Germany) Mona Barthel (LL)

‡ – withdrew from entry list
§ – withdrew from main draw

== Notes ==
Preceded by 2018 Wimbledon Championships	Grand Slams	Succeeded by 2019 Australian Open
