= 2018 US Open – Mixed doubles =

Mixed doubles
- 2018 US Open

Final
- Champions: (United States) Bethanie Mattek-Sands (United Kingdom) Jamie Murray
- Runners-up: (Poland) Alicja Rosolska (Croatia) Nikola Mektić
- Score: 2–6, 6–3, [11–9]

Details
- Draw: 32
- Seeds: 8

Events
Singles	men	women		boys	girls
Doubles	men	women	mixed	boys	girls
WC Singles	men	women	quad
WC Doubles	men	women	quad
Legends	men	women	mixed
- US Open

Martina Hingis and Jamie Murray were the defending champions, but Hingis retired from professional tennis at the end of 2017. Murray successfully defended his title alongside Bethanie Mattek-Sands, defeating Alicja Rosolska and Nikola Mektić, 2–6, 6–3, [11–9] to win the mixed doubles tennis title at the 2018 US Open.

== Seeds ==
1. (Canada) Gabriela Dabrowski / (Croatia) Mate Pavić (second round)
2. (United States) Nicole Melichar / (Austria) Oliver Marach (quarterfinals)
3. (Chinese Taipei) Chan Hao-ching / (Finland) Henri Kontinen (first round)
4. (Chinese Taipei) Latisha Chan / (Croatia) Ivan Dodig (second round, withdrew)
5. (Czech Republic) Andrea Sestini Hlaváčková / (France) Édouard Roger-Vasselin (quarterfinals)
6. (Netherlands) Demi Schuurs / (Netherlands) Matwé Middelkoop (first round)
7. (Slovenia) Katarina Srebotnik / (New Zealand) Michael Venus (second round)
8. (United States) Abigail Spears / (Colombia) Juan Sebastián Cabal (second round)

== Draw ==
Key

- Q = Qualifier
- WC = Wild card
- LL = Lucky loser
- Alt = Alternate
- ITF = ITF entry
- PR = Protected ranking
- SR = Special ranking
- SE = Special exempt
- JE = Junior exempt
- JR = Junior Accelerator Programme entrant
- CO = College Accelerator Programme entrant
- NG = Next Gen Accelerator Program entrant
- w/o = Walkover
- r = Retired
- d = Defaulted

=== Finals ===
Semifinals
WC	(United States) Christina McHale (United States) Christian Harrison	4	6	[8]
(United States) Bethanie Mattek-Sands (United Kingdom) Jamie Murray	6	2	[10]
(Poland) Alicja Rosolska (Croatia) Nikola Mektić	2	6	[10]
(China) Zhang Shuai (Australia) John Peers	6	4	[7]

Final
(United States) Bethanie Mattek-Sands (United Kingdom) Jamie Murray	2	6	[11]
(Poland) Alicja Rosolska (Croatia) Nikola Mektić	6	3	[9]

=== Top half ===
First round
1	(Canada) G Dabrowski (Croatia) M Pavić	6	6
WC	(United States) J Loeb (United States) N Rubin	0	4
WC	(United States) C McHale (United States) C Harrison	3	7	[10]
(United States) V King (United States) N Monroe	6	5	[5]
(Czech Republic) K Peschke (United States) R Ram	6	6
(Spain) L Arruabarrena (Spain) M López	4	3
(Spain) MJ Martínez Sánchez (Brazil) M Demoliner	6^{8}	1
5	(Czech Republic) A Sestini Hlaváčková (France) É Roger-Vasselin	7^{10}	6
4	(Chinese Taipei) L Chan (Croatia) I Dodig	6	3	[10]
(Ukraine) L Kichenok (New Zealand) A Sitak	4	6	[8]
WC	(United States) T Townsend (United States) D Young	1	5
(Ukraine) N Kichenok (Netherlands) W Koolhof	6	7
(United States) B Mattek-Sands (United Kingdom) J Murray	6	7^{7}
WC	(United States) A Anisimova (United States) M Mmoh	4	6^{2}
WC	(United States) K Christian (United States) J Cerretani	7	3	[6]
8	(United States) A Spears (Colombia) JS Cabal	5	6	[10]

Second round
1	(Canada) G Dabrowski (Croatia) M Pavić	5	3
WC	(United States) C McHale (United States) C Harrison	7	6
(Czech Republic) K Peschke (United States) R Ram	4	5
5	(Czech Republic) A Sestini Hlaváčková (France) É Roger-Vasselin	6	7
4	(Chinese Taipei) L Chan (Croatia) I Dodig
(Ukraine) N Kichenok (Netherlands) W Koolhof	w/o
(United States) B Mattek-Sands (United Kingdom) J Murray	6	7^{7}
8	(United States) A Spears (Colombia) JS Cabal	4	6^{2}

Quarterfinals
WC	(United States) C McHale (United States) C Harrison	6	6
5	(Czech Republic) A Sestini Hlaváčková (France) É Roger-Vasselin	3	4
(Ukraine) N Kichenok (Netherlands) W Koolhof	6^{5}	7^{8}	[7]
(United States) B Mattek-Sands (United Kingdom) J Murray	7^{7}	6^{6}	[10]

Semifinals
WC	(United States) C McHale (United States) C Harrison	4	6	[8]
(United States) B Mattek-Sands (United Kingdom) J Murray	6	2	[10]

=== Bottom half ===
First round
7	(Slovenia) K Srebotnik (New Zealand) M Venus	6	6
PR	(Germany) L Siegemund (India) R Bopanna	4	4
(Romania) R Olaru (Croatia) F Škugor	3	6	[10]
WC	(United States) D Collins (United States) T Fawcett	6	4	[3]
(Japan) M Ninomiya (Japan) B McLachlan	6	2	[6]
(Poland) A Rosolska (Croatia) N Mektić	4	6	[10]
WC	(United States) C Gauff (United States) C Eubanks	6	6
3	(Chinese Taipei) H-c Chan (Finland) H Kontinen	4	4
6	(Netherlands) D Schuurs (Netherlands) M Middelkoop	6	3	[8]
(China) S Zhang (Australia) J Peers	4	6	[10]
(Ukraine) E Svitolina (Brazil) B Soares	7	4	[13]
(Czech Republic) L Hradecká (Czech Republic) R Jebavý	5	6	[11]
(United States) R Atawo (Pakistan) A-u-H Qureshi	3	2
(Germany) A-L Grönefeld (Mexico) S González	6	6
WC	(United States) W Osuigwe (United States) F Tiafoe	5	1
2	(United States) N Melichar (Austria) O Marach	7	6

Second round
7	(Slovenia) K Srebotnik (New Zealand) M Venus	6	4	[14]
(Romania) R Olaru (Croatia) F Škugor	4	6	[16]
(Poland) A Rosolska (Croatia) N Mektić	6	6
WC	(United States) C Gauff (United States) C Eubanks	2	1
(China) S Zhang (Australia) J Peers	6	6
(Ukraine) E Svitolina (Brazil) B Soares	3	3
(Germany) A-L Grönefeld (Mexico) S González	4	4
2	(United States) N Melichar (Austria) O Marach	6	6

Quarterfinals
(Romania) R Olaru (Croatia) F Škugor	6^{5}	4
(Poland) A Rosolska (Croatia) N Mektić	7^{7}	6
(China) S Zhang (Australia) J Peers	3	7^{9}	[11]
2	(United States) N Melichar (Austria) O Marach	6	6^{7}	[9]

Semifinals
(Poland) A Rosolska (Croatia) N Mektić	2	6	[10]
(China) S Zhang (Australia) J Peers	6	4	[7]
