= 2018 US Open – Women's doubles =

Women's doubles
- 2018 US Open

Final
- Champions: (Australia) Ashleigh Barty (United States) CoCo Vandeweghe
- Runners-up: (Hungary) Tímea Babos (France) Kristina Mladenovic
- Score: 3–6, 7–6^{(7–2)}, 7–6^{(8–6)}

Details
- Draw: 64 (7 WC )
- Seeds: 16

Events
Singles	men	women		boys	girls
Doubles	men	women	mixed	boys	girls
WC Singles	men	women	quad
WC Doubles	men	women	quad
Legends	men	women	mixed
← 2017 ·	US Open	· 2019 →

Ashleigh Barty and CoCo Vandeweghe defeated Tímea Babos and Kristina Mladenovic in the final, 3–6, 7–6^{(7–2)}, 7–6^{(8–6)} to win the women's doubles tennis title at the 2018 US Open. They saved three championship points en route to the title.

Babos, Ekaterina Makarova, and Kateřina Siniaková were in contention for the WTA No. 1 doubles ranking. Babos retained the ranking at the end of the tournament after Makarova failed to reach the final and Siniaková failed to claim the title.

Latisha Chan and Martina Hingis were the defending champions, but Hingis retired from professional tennis at the end of 2017. Chan played alongside Victoria Azarenka, but they retired in the second round against Raquel Atawo and Anna-Lena Grönefeld.

== Seeds ==
1. (Czech Republic) Barbora Krejčíková / (Czech Republic) Kateřina Siniaková (semifinals)
2. (Hungary) Tímea Babos / (France) Kristina Mladenovic (final)
3. (Czech Republic) Andrea Sestini Hlaváčková / (Czech Republic) Barbora Strýcová (third round)
4. (Canada) Gabriela Dabrowski / (China) Xu Yifan (second round)
5. (Slovenia) Andreja Klepač / (Spain) María José Martínez Sánchez (first round)
6. (Czech Republic) Lucie Hradecká / (Russia) Ekaterina Makarova (quarterfinals)
7. (Belgium) Elise Mertens / (Netherlands) Demi Schuurs (quarterfinals)
8. (United States) Nicole Melichar / (Czech Republic) Květa Peschke (first round)

9. (Netherlands) Kiki Bertens / (Sweden) Johanna Larsson (second round)
10. (Chinese Taipei) Chan Hao-ching / (China) Yang Zhaoxuan (second round)
11. (United States) Vania King / (Slovenia) Katarina Srebotnik (first round)
12. (Poland) Alicja Rosolska / (United States) Abigail Spears (first round)
13. (Australia) Ashleigh Barty / (United States) CoCo Vandeweghe (champions)
14. (United States) Raquel Atawo / (Germany) Anna-Lena Grönefeld (third round)
15. (Romania) Irina-Camelia Begu / (Romania) Monica Niculescu (second round)
16. (Japan) Miyu Kato / (Japan) Makoto Ninomiya (first round)

Click on the seed number of a player to go to their draw section.

== Draw ==
=== Key ===
- Q = Qualifier
- WC = Wild card
- LL = Lucky loser
- Alt = Alternate
- SE = Special exempt
- PR = Protected ranking
- ITF = ITF entry
- JE = Junior exempt
- w/o = Walkover
- r = Retired
- d = Defaulted
- SR = Special ranking

=== Finals ===
Quarterfinals
1	(Czech Republic) Barbora Krejčíková (Czech Republic) Kateřina Siniaková	2	7^{9}	6
7	(Belgium) Elise Mertens (Netherlands) Demi Schuurs	6	6^{7}	3
13	(Australia) Ashleigh Barty (United States) CoCo Vandeweghe	6	6
(Slovenia) Dalila Jakupović (Russia) Irina Khromacheva	2	3
(Russia) Anastasia Pavlyuchenkova (Latvia) Anastasija Sevastova	2	3
(Australia) Samantha Stosur (China) Zhang Shuai	6	6
6	(Czech Republic) Lucie Hradecká (Russia) Ekaterina Makarova	6^{5}	2
2	(Hungary) Tímea Babos (France) Kristina Mladenovic	7^{7}	6

Semifinals
1	(Czech Republic) Barbora Krejčíková (Czech Republic) Kateřina Siniaková	4	6^{6}
13	(Australia) Ashleigh Barty (United States) CoCo Vandeweghe	6	7^{8}
(Australia) Samantha Stosur (China) Zhang Shuai	4	6^{4}
2	(Hungary) Tímea Babos (France) Kristina Mladenovic	6	7^{7}

Final
13	(Australia) Ashleigh Barty (United States) CoCo Vandeweghe	3	7^{7}	7^{8}
2	(Hungary) Tímea Babos (France) Kristina Mladenovic	6	6^{2}	6^{6}

=== Top half ===
==== Section 1 ====
First round
1	(Czech Republic) B Krejčíková (Czech Republic) K Siniaková	7^{7}	6
(Ukraine) K Bondarenko (Serbia) A Krunić	6^{4}	1
PR	(Kazakhstan) Z Diyas (China) S Zheng	3	6^{5}
(United States) B Mattek-Sands (Czech Republic) L Šafářová	6	7^{7}
(Romania) S Cîrstea (Spain) S Sorribes Tormo	6^{2}	2
PR	(Ukraine) L Kichenok (Germany) L Siegemund	7^{7}	6
(Russia) N Dzalamidze (Latvia) J Ostapenko	3	6^{5}
15	(Romania) I-C Begu (Romania) M Niculescu	6	7^{7}
11	(United States) V King (Slovenia) K Srebotnik	7^{10}	4	2
(Serbia) N Stojanović (Hungary) F Stollár	6^{8}	6	6
(Croatia) D Jurak (Switzerland) X Knoll	1	3
(Chinese Taipei) S-w Hsieh (Belarus) A Sabalenka	6	6
PR	(Russia) V Diatchenko (Russia) M Gasparyan	1	6	6
WC	(United States) S Kenin (United States) S Vickery	6	2	3
(Australia) D Gavrilova (Croatia) P Martić	3	7	2
7	(Belgium) E Mertens (Netherlands) D Schuurs	6	5	6

Second round
1	(Czech Republic) B Krejčíková (Czech Republic) K Siniaková	6	6
(United States) B Mattek-Sands (Czech Republic) L Šafářová	4	3
PR	(Ukraine) L Kichenok (Germany) L Siegemund	3	6	6
15	(Romania) I-C Begu (Romania) M Niculescu	6	3	2
(Serbia) N Stojanović (Hungary) F Stollár	4	6^{5}
(Chinese Taipei) S-w Hsieh (Belarus) A Sabalenka	6	7^{7}
PR	(Russia) V Diatchenko (Russia) M Gasparyan	4	0
7	(Belgium) E Mertens (Netherlands) D Schuurs	6	6

Third round
1	(Czech Republic) B Krejčíková (Czech Republic) K Siniaková	6	6
PR	(Ukraine) L Kichenok (Germany) L Siegemund	3	2
(Chinese Taipei) S-w Hsieh (Belarus) A Sabalenka	5	4
7	(Belgium) E Mertens (Netherlands) D Schuurs	7	6

Quarterfinals
1	(Czech Republic) B Krejčíková (Czech Republic) K Siniaková	2	7^{9}	6
7	(Belgium) E Mertens (Netherlands) D Schuurs	6	6^{7}	3

==== Section 2 ====
First round
3	(Czech Republic) A Sestini Hlaváčková (Czech Republic) B Strýcová	6	7
WC	(United States) A Kiick (United States) J Loeb	1	5
(China) X Han (Romania) R Olaru	6	6
(Germany) T Maria (United Kingdom) H Watson	3	3
WC	(United States) C McNally (United States) W Osuigwe	1	6	2
(Australia) M Adamczak (United States) D Krawczyk	6	3	6
(China) Q Wang (China) Y Wang	3	0
13	(Australia) A Barty (United States) C Vandeweghe	6	6
9	(Netherlands) K Bertens (Sweden) J Larsson	6	6
(Estonia) K Kanepi (Germany) A Petkovic	2	4
(Japan) N Hibino (Georgia (country)) O Kalashnikova	6	4	7^{8}
(Switzerland) B Bencic (Ukraine) K Kozlova	4	6	6^{6}
(Slovenia) D Jakupović (Russia) I Khromacheva	6	6
PR	(Spain) A Medina Garrigues (Spain) A Parra Santonja	4	0
WC	(United States) J Brady (United States) A Muhammad	6^{5}	6	7
8	(United States) N Melichar (Czech Republic) K Peschke	7^{7}	3	5

Second round
3	(Czech Republic) A Sestini Hlaváčková (Czech Republic) B Strýcová	6	7^{7}
(China) X Han (Romania) R Olaru	1	6^{5}
(Australia) M Adamczak (United States) D Krawczyk	2	5
13	(Australia) A Barty (United States) C Vandeweghe	6	7
9	(Netherlands) K Bertens (Sweden) J Larsson	6^{3}	4
(Japan) N Hibino (Georgia (country)) O Kalashnikova	7^{7}	6
(Slovenia) D Jakupović (Russia) I Khromacheva	7	6
WC	(United States) J Brady (United States) A Muhammad	5	4

Third round
3	(Czech Republic) A Sestini Hlaváčková (Czech Republic) B Strýcová	3	3
13	(Australia) A Barty (United States) C Vandeweghe	6	6
(Japan) N Hibino (Georgia (country)) O Kalashnikova	4	1
(Slovenia) D Jakupović (Russia) I Khromacheva	6	6

Quarterfinals
13	(Australia) A Barty (United States) C Vandeweghe	6	6
(Slovenia) D Jakupović (Russia) I Khromacheva	2	3

=== Bottom half ===
==== Section 3 ====
First round
5	(Slovenia) A Klepač (Spain) MJ Martínez Sánchez	3	5
(Russia) A Pavlyuchenkova (Latvia) A Sevastova	6	7
(Ukraine) O Savchuk (Ukraine) E Svitolina	2	5
(Slovakia) V Kužmová (Slovakia) M Rybáriková	6	7
WC	(United States) C Dolehide (United States) C McHale	6	6
WC	(United States) V Lepchenko (United States) B Pera	2	1
(United States) A Riske (United States) T Townsend	6^{5}	2
10	(Chinese Taipei) H-c Chan (China) Z Yang	7^{7}	6
16	(Japan) M Kato (Japan) M Ninomiya	3	4
(United Kingdom) N Broady (United States) D Collins	6	6
PR	(Switzerland) T Bacsinszky (Russia) V Zvonareva	1	6	6
(Romania) I Bara (France) A Cornet	6	4	4
(Japan) E Hozumi (Russia) V Kudermetova	2	6	2
(Australia) S Stosur (China) S Zhang	6	4	6
(Spain) L Arruabarrena (Czech Republic) R Voráčová	2	7^{7}	1
4	(Canada) G Dabrowski (China) Y Xu	6	6^{5}	6

Second round
(Russia) A Pavlyuchenkova (Latvia) A Sevastova	4	7^{7}	7^{7}
(Slovakia) V Kužmová (Slovakia) M Rybáriková	6	6^{1}	6^{4}
WC	(United States) C Dolehide (United States) C McHale	5	6	7^{7}
10	(Chinese Taipei) H-c Chan (China) Z Yang	7	2	6^{5}
(United Kingdom) N Broady (United States) D Collins	2	5
PR	(Switzerland) T Bacsinszky (Russia) V Zvonareva	6	7
(Australia) S Stosur (China) S Zhang	6	7^{7}
4	(Canada) G Dabrowski (China) Y Xu	2	6^{2}

Third round
(Russia) A Pavlyuchenkova (Latvia) A Sevastova	6	6
WC	(United States) C Dolehide (United States) C McHale	4	3
PR	(Switzerland) T Bacsinszky (Russia) V Zvonareva	3	3
(Australia) S Stosur (China) S Zhang	6	6

Quarterfinals
(Russia) A Pavlyuchenkova (Latvia) A Sevastova	2	3
(Australia) S Stosur (China) S Zhang	6	6

==== Section 4 ====
First round
6	(Czech Republic) L Hradecká (Russia) E Makarova	6	6
(United States) K Christian (Sweden) R Peterson	2	3
(Japan) S Aoyama (China) Y Duan	6	6
(Belarus) A Sasnovich (Kazakhstan) G Voskoboeva	3	1
(Ukraine) N Kichenok (Australia) An Rodionova	2	1
(Poland) M Linette (Australia) A Tomljanović	6	6
(Netherlands) L Kerkhove (Belarus) L Marozava	6	6
12	(Poland) A Rosolska (United States) A Spears	4	4
14	(United States) R Atawo (Germany) A-L Grönefeld	7^{7}	6
PR	(Netherlands) M Krajicek (France) P Parmentier	6^{3}	4
(Belarus) V Azarenka (Chinese Taipei) L Chan	6	4	6
(Romania) A Bogdan (Kazakhstan) Y Putintseva	4	6	4
(Chile) A Guarachi (Belarus) V Lapko	1	6	1
WC	(United States) N Gibbs (United States) S Santamaria	6	1	6
(Belgium) K Flipkens (Belgium) A Van Uytvanck	4	5
2	(Hungary) T Babos (France) K Mladenovic	6	7

Second round
6	(Czech Republic) L Hradecká (Russia) E Makarova	3	6	7
(Japan) S Aoyama (China) Y Duan	6	4	5
(Poland) M Linette (Australia) A Tomljanović	6^{5}	6	6
(Netherlands) L Kerkhove (Belarus) L Marozava	7^{7}	3	1
14	(United States) R Atawo (Germany) A-L Grönefeld	4
(Belarus) V Azarenka (Chinese Taipei) L Chan	1^{r}
WC	(United States) N Gibbs (United States) S Santamaria	0	2
2	(Hungary) T Babos (France) K Mladenovic	6	6

Third round
6	(Czech Republic) L Hradecká (Russia) E Makarova	6	6
(Poland) M Linette (Australia) A Tomljanović	4	4
14	(United States) R Atawo (Germany) A-L Grönefeld	3	4
2	(Hungary) T Babos (France) K Mladenovic	6	6

Quarterfinals
6	(Czech Republic) L Hradecká (Russia) E Makarova	6^{5}	2
2	(Hungary) T Babos (France) K Mladenovic	7^{7}	6
