= Anton Matusevich =

British tennis player

- Matusevich at the 2026 Wimbledon Championships
- Country (sports): Great Britain
- Born: 30 May 2001 (age 25) New York City, US
- Height: 1.85 m (6 ft 1 in)
- Plays: Right-handed (two-handed backhand)
- Coach: Bojan Jelovac
- Prize money: US $243,654

Singles
- Career record: 0–0 (at ATP Tour level, Grand Slam level, and in Davis Cup)
- Career titles: 0
- Highest ranking: No. 307 (19 October 2026)
- Current ranking: No. 307 (19 October 2026)

Grand Slam singles results
- Wimbledon: Q3 (2021)

Doubles
- Career record: 0–1 (at ATP Tour level, Grand Slam level, and in Davis Cup)
- Career titles: 0
- Highest ranking: No. 493 (29 July 2024)
- Current ranking: No. 812 (19 October 2026)

Grand Slam doubles results
- Wimbledon: 1R (2021)
- Last updated on: 19 October 2026.

Anton Matusevich (born 30 May 2001) is an American-born British tennis player. He has a career high ATP singles ranking of World No. 307 achieved on 19 October 2026 and a doubles ranking of No. 493 achieved on 29 July 2024. He won the 2018 US Open Junior doubles title with Adrian Andreev.

Matusevich won the Battle of the Brits Premier League Tennis men's event, held in December 2020.

== Early life ==
Matusevich was born in New York City and began tennis at the age of 4. He attended The Judd School in Tonbridge.

== ITF World Tennis Tour finals ==
=== Singles: 14 (7 titles, 7 runner-ups) ===
Legend ITF WTT (7–7)	Finals by surface Hard (7–5) Clay (0–2) Grass (0–0) Carpet (0–0)

Result	W–L	Date	Tournament	Tier	Surface	Opponent	Score
Win	1–0	Oct 2019	M15 Getafe, Spain	WTT	Hard	(Spain) Nicolás Álvarez Varona	7–5, 6–4
Win	2–0	Dec 2019	M15 Tallahassee, USA	WTT	Hard	(Burundi) Guy Orly Iradukunda	3–6, 6–1, 7–5
Win	3–0	May 2021	M15 Kouvola, Finland	WTT	Hard	(Japan) Naoki Tajima	6–1, 4–6, 6–0
Loss	3–1	Jan 2023	M25 Sunderland, United Kingdom	WTT	Hard (i)	(France) Clément Chidekh	walkover
Loss	3–2	Aug 2023	M25 Sion, Switzerland	WTT	Clay	(Switzerland) Rémy Bertola	2–6, 5–7
Loss	3–3	Oct 2023	M25 Glasgow, United Kingdom	WTT	Hard	(Belgium) Alexander Blockx	7–5, 4–6, 2–6
Loss	3–4	Apr 2024	M25 Reus, Spain	WTT	Clay	(Germany) Nicola Kuhn	7–5, 6–7^{(2–7)}, 3–6
Win	4–4	Oct 2024	M25 Edgbaston, Great Britain	WTT	Hard	(Italy) Federico Bondioli	6–2, 3–6, 7–5
Loss	4–5	Oct 2024	M25 Glasgow, Great Britain	WTT	Hard	(Denmark) Christian Sigsgaard	2–6, 6–7^{(5–7)}
Loss	4–6	Oct 2025	M25 Sheffield, Great Britain	WTT	Hard	(United Kingdom) James Story	2–6, 6–3, 6–7^{(4–7)}
Win	5–6	Feb 2026	M25 The Hague, Netherlands	WTT	Hard	(Germany) Mika Petkovic	3–6, 6–4, 6–4
Win	6–6	Mar 2026	M25 Poitiers, France	WTT	Hard	(Italy) Leonardo Rossi	7–6^{(10–8)}, 6–3
Win	7–6	May 2026	M25 Nottingham, Great Britain	WTT	Hard	(United Kingdom) Henry Searle	7–6^{(8–6)}, 7–6^{(11–9)}
Loss	7–7	May 2026	M25 Nottingham, Great Britain	WTT	Hard	(United States) Braden Shick	6–7^{(2–7)}, 4–6

== Junior Grand Slam finals ==
=== Doubles: 1 (1 title) ===
Result	Year	Tournament	Surface	Partner	Opponents	Score
Win	2018	US Open	Hard	(Bulgaria) Adrian Andreev	(United States) Emilio Nava (United States) Axel Nefve	6–4, 2–6, [10–8]
