= Wojciech Marek =

Polish tennis player (born 2001)

- Country (sports): Poland
- Residence: Bytom, Poland
- Born: 27 May 2001 (age 25) Bytom, Poland
- Height: 1.91 m (6 ft 3 in)
- Turned pro: 2019
- Plays: Right-handed (two-handed backhand)
- Coach: Aleksander Charpantidis
- Prize money: US $40,751

Singles
- Career record: 0–1 (at ATP Tour level, Grand Slam level, and in Davis Cup)
- Career titles: 0
- Highest ranking: No. 629 (22 February 2021)
- Current ranking: No. 1,135 (9 November 2026)

Doubles
- Career record: 0–0 (at ATP Tour level, Grand Slam level, and in Davis Cup)
- Career titles: 0
- Highest ranking: No. 770 (23 August 2021)
- Current ranking: No. 1,526 (9 November 2026)
- Last updated on: 9 November 2026.

Wojciech Marek (born 27 May 2001) is a Polish tennis player. Marek has a career high ATP singles ranking of No. 629 achieved on 22 February 2021 and a career high ATP doubles ranking of No. 770 achieved on 23 August 2021.

Marek represents Poland at the Davis Cup, where he has a W/L record of 0–1.
