= 2018 US Open – Men's doubles =

Men's doubles
- 2018 US Open

Final
- Champions: (United States) Mike Bryan (United States) Jack Sock
- Runners-up: (Poland) Łukasz Kubot (Brazil) Marcelo Melo
- Score: 6–3, 6–1

Details
- Draw: 64
- Seeds: 16

Events
Singles	men	women		boys	girls
Doubles	men	women	mixed	boys	girls
WC Singles	men	women	quad
WC Doubles	men	women	quad
Legends	men	women	mixed
- US Open

Mike Bryan and Jack Sock won their second consecutive Grand Slam as a pair, defeating Łukasz Kubot and Marcelo Melo in the final, 6–3, 6–1. Mike Bryan won an all-time record 18th Grand Slam men's doubles title, and with a sixth US Open men's doubles title, he equals Richard Sears and Holcombe Ward.

Bryan retained the ATP number 1 doubles ranking at the conclusion of this tournament, after fellow contenders Oliver Marach and John Peers both lost in the early rounds. Sock reached a career-high ranking of No. 2 after this tournament.

Jean-Julien Rojer and Horia Tecău were the defending champions, but lost to Radu Albot and Malek Jaziri in the second round. Albot became the first Moldovan to reach the second week and also the semifinal stage at a Grand Slam.

== Seeds ==
1. (Austria) Oliver Marach / (Croatia) Mate Pavić (first round)
2. (Finland) Henri Kontinen / (Australia) John Peers (second round)
3. (United States) Mike Bryan / (United States) Jack Sock (champions)
4. (United Kingdom) Jamie Murray / (Brazil) Bruno Soares (quarterfinals)
5. (Colombia) Juan Sebastián Cabal / (Colombia) Robert Farah (semifinals)
6. (Netherlands) Jean-Julien Rojer / (Romania) Horia Tecău (second round)
7. (Poland) Łukasz Kubot / (Brazil) Marcelo Melo (final)
8. (South Africa) Raven Klaasen / (New Zealand) Michael Venus (second round)

9. (France) Pierre-Hugues Herbert / (France) Nicolas Mahut (third round)
10. (Spain) Feliciano López / (Spain) Marc López (second round)
11. (Croatia) Ivan Dodig / (Spain) Marcel Granollers (third round)
12. (Japan) Ben McLachlan / (Germany) Jan-Lennard Struff (first round)
13. (Chile) Julio Peralta / (Argentina) Horacio Zeballos (second round)
14. (Netherlands) Robin Haase / (Netherlands) Matwé Middelkoop (third round)
15. (India) Rohan Bopanna / (France) Édouard Roger-Vasselin (quarterfinals)
16. (United Kingdom) Dominic Inglot / (Croatia) Franko Škugor (third round)

Click on the seed number of a player to go to their draw section.

== Draw ==
Key

- Q = Qualifier
- WC = Wild card
- LL = Lucky loser
- Alt = Alternate
- ITF = ITF entry
- PR = Protected ranking
- SR = Special ranking
- SE = Special exempt
- JE = Junior exempt
- JR = Junior Accelerator Programme entrant
- CO = College Accelerator Programme entrant
- NG = Next Gen Accelerator Program entrant
- w/o = Walkover
- r = Retired
- d = Defaulted

=== Finals ===
Quarterfinals
(United States) Austin Krajicek (United States) Tennys Sandgren	4	2
7	(Poland) Łukasz Kubot (Brazil) Marcelo Melo	6	6
4	(United Kingdom) Jamie Murray (Brazil) Bruno Soares	5	4
Alt	(Moldova) Radu Albot (Tunisia) Malek Jaziri	7	6
(Argentina) Máximo González (Chile) Nicolás Jarry	4	6^{3}
3	(United States) Mike Bryan (United States) Jack Sock	6	7^{7}
5	(Colombia) Juan Sebastián Cabal (Colombia) Robert Farah	6	6
15	(India) Rohan Bopanna (France) Édouard Roger-Vasselin	3	4

Semifinals
7	(Poland) Łukasz Kubot (Brazil) Marcelo Melo	7^{7}	3	6
Alt	(Moldova) Radu Albot (Tunisia) Malek Jaziri	6^{3}	6	3
3	(United States) Mike Bryan (United States) Jack Sock	6	6^{1}	6
5	(Colombia) Juan Sebastián Cabal (Colombia) Robert Farah	2	7^{7}	4

Final
7	(Poland) Łukasz Kubot (Brazil) Marcelo Melo	3	1
3	(United States) Mike Bryan (United States) Jack Sock	6	6

=== Top half ===
==== Section 1 ====
First round
1	(Austria) O Marach (Croatia) M Pavić	6	6^{5}	5
(Argentina) L Mayer (Portugal) J Sousa	3	7^{7}	7
(Germany) P Gojowczyk (India) P Raja	6^{2}	4
PR	(Croatia) N Mektić (Austria) J Melzer	7^{7}	6
(Israel) J Erlich (Pakistan) A-u-H Qureshi	3	4
(United States) A Krajicek (United States) T Sandgren	6	6
(Denmark) F Nielsen (United Kingdom) J Salisbury	4	2
13	(Chile) J Peralta (Argentina) H Zeballos	6	6
9	(France) P-H Herbert (France) N Mahut	6	3	7^{7}
(United States) N Monroe (Australia) J-P Smith	3	6	6^{2}
(Italy) S Bolelli (Italy) F Fognini	6	3	6
(Germany) K Krawietz (Germany) M Marterer	4	6	3
(India) D Sharan (New Zealand) A Sitak	6	6
WC	(United States) Ma Redlicki (United States) E Zhu	4	4
Alt	(Mexico) H Hach Verdugo (Sweden) A Siljeström	3	6^{2}
7	(Poland) Ł Kubot (Brazil) M Melo	6	7^{7}

Second round
(Argentina) L Mayer (Portugal) J Sousa	3	3
PR	(Croatia) N Mektić (Austria) J Melzer	6	6
(United States) A Krajicek (United States) T Sandgren	6	7^{7}
13	(Chile) J Peralta (Argentina) H Zeballos	4	6^{4}
9	(France) P-H Herbert (France) N Mahut	7	6
(Italy) S Bolelli (Italy) F Fognini	5	3
(India) D Sharan (New Zealand) A Sitak	3	6	3
7	(Poland) Ł Kubot (Brazil) M Melo	6	3	6

Third round
PR	(Croatia) N Mektić (Austria) J Melzer	3	4
(United States) A Krajicek (United States) T Sandgren	6	6
9	(France) P-H Herbert (France) N Mahut	5	6	3
7	(Poland) Ł Kubot (Brazil) M Melo	7	2	6

Quarterfinals
(United States) A Krajicek (United States) T Sandgren	4	2
7	(Poland) Ł Kubot (Brazil) M Melo	6	6

==== Section 2 ====
First round
4	(United Kingdom) J Murray (Brazil) B Soares	6	6
(Argentina) G Pella (Spain) A Ramos Viñolas	2	3
(New Zealand) M Daniell (Netherlands) W Koolhof	6	7^{10}
(Belarus) M Mirnyi (Austria) P Oswald	3	6^{8}
(Germany) P Petzschner (Germany) T Pütz	6	6
(France) J Eysseric (Hungary) M Fucsovics	1	2
WC	(United States) C Eubanks (United States) D Young	2	6	6^{6}
14	(Netherlands) R Haase (Netherlands) M Middelkoop	6	4	7^{8}
10	(Spain) F López (Spain) M López	4	6	6
WC	(United States) P Kypson (United States) D Thomas	6	2	4
WC	(United States) B Klahn (Canada) D Nestor	3	3
WC	(United States) C Harrison (United States) R Harrison	6	6
Alt	(Moldova) R Albot (Tunisia) M Jaziri	7^{7}	7^{7}
(United Kingdom) K Skupski (United Kingdom) N Skupski	6^{4}	6^{5}
(Netherlands) S Arends (Croatia) A Šančić	3	4
6	(Netherlands) J-J Rojer (Romania) H Tecău	6	6

Second round
4	(United Kingdom) J Murray (Brazil) B Soares	6	6
(New Zealand) M Daniell (Netherlands) W Koolhof	3	4
(Germany) P Petzschner (Germany) T Pütz	3	6	1
14	(Netherlands) R Haase (Netherlands) M Middelkoop	6	3	6
10	(Spain) F López (Spain) M López	2	6	3
WC	(United States) C Harrison (United States) R Harrison	6	4	6
Alt	(Moldova) R Albot (Tunisia) M Jaziri	3	7^{10}	6
6	(Netherlands) J-J Rojer (Romania) H Tecău	6	6^{8}	2

Third round
4	(United Kingdom) J Murray (Brazil) B Soares	7^{7}	6
14	(Netherlands) R Haase (Netherlands) M Middelkoop	6^{4}	4
WC	(United States) C Harrison (United States) R Harrison	2	6	6^{5}
Alt	(Moldova) R Albot (Tunisia) M Jaziri	6	4	7^{7}

Quarterfinals
4	(United Kingdom) J Murray (Brazil) B Soares	5	4
Alt	(Moldova) R Albot (Tunisia) M Jaziri	7	6

=== Bottom half ===
==== Section 3 ====
First round
8	(South Africa) R Klaasen (New Zealand) M Venus	6	6
(Slovakia) L Lacko (Australia) J Millman	2	2
(Argentina) M González (Chile) N Jarry	6	6
(Spain) D Marrero (Poland) M Matkowski	3	4
WC	(United States) E King (United States) N Pasha	4	4
(Czech Republic) R Jebavý (Argentina) A Molteni	6	6
(Italy) M Berrettini (Italy) A Seppi	7^{7}	1	6
12	(Japan) B McLachlan (Germany) J-L Struff	6^{5}	6	4
16	(United Kingdom) D Inglot (Croatia) F Škugor	6	7^{11}
(Sweden) R Lindstedt (United States) R Ram	4	6^{9}
(United Kingdom) C Norrie (Argentina) D Schwartzman	6	4	1
(Serbia) D Lajović (Greece) S Tsitsipas	3	6	6
PR	(United States) M McDonald (Japan) Y Nishioka	6	6
(Bosnia and Herzegovina) M Bašić (Bosnia and Herzegovina) D Džumhur	3	2
(Italy) D Bracciali (Italy) M Cecchinato	1	1
3	(United States) M Bryan (United States) J Sock	6	6

Second round
8	(South Africa) R Klaasen (New Zealand) M Venus	3	6^{5}
(Argentina) M González (Chile) N Jarry	6	7^{7}
(Czech Republic) R Jebavý (Argentina) A Molteni	7^{7}	6
(Italy) M Berrettini (Italy) A Seppi	6^{3}	4
16	(United Kingdom) D Inglot (Croatia) F Škugor	6^{5}	6	6
(Serbia) D Lajović (Greece) S Tsitsipas	7^{7}	3	4
PR	(United States) M McDonald (Japan) Y Nishioka	1	5
3	(United States) M Bryan (United States) J Sock	6	7

Third round
(Argentina) M González (Chile) N Jarry	6	6
(Czech Republic) R Jebavý (Argentina) A Molteni	3	4
16	(United Kingdom) D Inglot (Croatia) F Škugor	2	4
3	(United States) M Bryan (United States) J Sock	6	6

Quarterfinals
(Argentina) M González (Chile) N Jarry	4	6^{3}
3	(United States) M Bryan (United States) J Sock	6	7^{7}

==== Section 4 ====
First round
5	(Colombia) JS Cabal (Colombia) R Farah	6	6
Alt	(Uzbekistan) D Istomin (India) J Nedunchezhiyan	3	2
(Brazil) M Demoliner (Mexico) S González	7	7^{7}
(France) H Nys (France) B Paire	5	6^{2}
Alt	(United States) R Galloway (United States) N Lammons	6	6
WC	(United States) K King (United States) R Opelka	2	2
Alt	(Monaco) R Arneodo (United Kingdom) L Bambridge	3	7^{7}	4
11	(Croatia) I Dodig (Spain) M Granollers	6	6^{4}	6
15	(India) R Bopanna (France) É Roger-Vasselin	4	6	6
(Cyprus) M Baghdatis (Germany) M Zverev	6	3	4
(Serbia) F Krajinović (Serbia) V Troicki	3	2
(Australia) M Ebden (United States) J Withrow	6	6
(France) J Chardy (France) F Martin	6	6
(United States) J Cerretani (India) L Paes	3	4
(El Salvador) M Arévalo (Mexico) MÁ Reyes-Varela	7	6^{2}	6^{5}
2	(Finland) H Kontinen (Australia) J Peers	5	7^{7}	7^{7}

Second round
5	(Colombia) JS Cabal (Colombia) R Farah	6	7^{7}
(Brazil) M Demoliner (Mexico) S González	4	6^{4}
Alt	(United States) R Galloway (United States) N Lammons	4	6^{1}
11	(Croatia) I Dodig (Spain) M Granollers	6	7^{7}
15	(India) R Bopanna (France) É Roger-Vasselin	6	6
(Australia) M Ebden (United States) J Withrow	4	4
(France) J Chardy (France) F Martin	7^{7}	3	7^{7}
2	(Finland) H Kontinen (Australia) J Peers	6^{4}	6	6^{3}

Third round
5	(Colombia) JS Cabal (Colombia) R Farah	6	2	6
11	(Croatia) I Dodig (Spain) M Granollers	2	6	3
15	(India) R Bopanna (France) É Roger-Vasselin	7^{8}	4	6
(France) J Chardy (France) F Martin	6^{6}	6	3

Quarterfinals
5	(Colombia) JS Cabal (Colombia) R Farah	6	6
15	(India) R Bopanna (France) É Roger-Vasselin	3	4
