= 2018 US Open – Girls' singles =

Girls' singles
- 2018 US Open

Final
- Champion: (China) Wang Xiyu
- Runner-up: (France) Clara Burel
- Score: 7–6^{(7–4)}, 6–2

Events
Singles	men	women		boys	girls
Doubles	men	women	mixed	boys	girls
WC Singles	men	women	quad
WC Doubles	men	women	quad
Legends	men	women	mixed
- US Open

Amanda Anisimova was the defending champion, but was chosen to compete in the women's singles instead as a wild card losing to Taylor Townsend in the first round.

Wang Xiyu won the title, defeating Clara Burel in the final, 7–6^{(7–4)}, 6–2.

== Seeds ==
1. (United States) Cori Gauff (quarterfinals)
2. (United States) Alexa Noel (second round)
3. (China) Wang Xiyu (champion)
4. (Colombia) Camila Osorio (semifinals)
5. (United States) Caty McNally (third round)
6. (Denmark) Clara Tauson (second round)
7. (Luxembourg) Eléonora Molinaro (first round)
8. (Canada) Leylah Annie Fernandez (quarterfinals)
9. (Japan) Naho Sato (quarterfinals)
10. (Argentina) María Lourdes Carlé (first round)
11. (France) Clara Burel (final)
12. (Chinese Taipei) Joanna Garland (first round)
13. (Italy) Elisabetta Cocciaretto (first round)
14. (China) Zheng Qinwen (third round)
15. (United States) Katie Volynets (first round)
16. (United States) Lea Ma (third round)

== Main draw ==
Key

- Q = Qualifier
- WC = Wild card
- LL = Lucky loser
- Alt = Alternate
- ITF = ITF entry
- PR = Protected ranking
- SR = Special ranking
- SE = Special exempt
- JE = Junior exempt
- JR = Junior Accelerator Programme entrant
- CO = College Accelerator Programme entrant
- NG = Next Gen Accelerator Program entrant
- w/o = Walkover
- r = Retired
- d = Defaulted

=== Finals ===
Quarterfinals
1	(United States) Cori Gauff	4	6	2
Q	(Ukraine) Daria Lopatetska	6	3	6
3	(China) Wang Xiyu	7^{7}	6
9	(Japan) Naho Sato	6^{5}	2
8	(Canada) Leylah Annie Fernandez	6	3	2
4	(Colombia) Camila Osorio	3	6	6
11	(France) Clara Burel	6	6
(United Kingdom) Emma Raducanu	2	0

Semifinals
Q	(Ukraine) Daria Lopatetska	1	7	3
3	(China) Wang Xiyu	6	5	6
4	(Colombia) Camila Osorio	5	6	6^{3}
11	(France) Clara Burel	7	1	7^{7}

Final
3	(China) Wang Xiyu	7^{7}	6
11	(France) Clara Burel	6^{4}	2

=== Top half ===
==== Section 1 ====
First round
1	(United States) Cori Gauff	7	6
(Switzerland) Lulu Sun	5	3
(Argentina) Ana Geller	5	0^{r}
(Romania) Selma Ștefania Cadar	7	2
WC	(United States) Hailey Baptiste	6	7^{7}
(Georgia (country)) Ana Makatsaria	2	6^{5}
(Russia) Oksana Selekhmeteva	7	6
13	(Italy) Elisabetta Cocciaretto	5	4
12	(Chinese Taipei) Joanna Garland	5	6	2
(United States) Elizabeth Mandlik	7	3	6
(Guatemala) María Gabriela Rivera Corado	2	2
(France) Diane Parry	6	6
WC	(United States) Connie Ma	5	0
Q	(Ukraine) Daria Lopatetska	7	6
(Belarus) Viktoryia Kanapatskaya	0	4
6	(Denmark) Clara Tauson	6	6

Second round
1	(United States) C Gauff	6	6
(Romania) SȘ Cadar	2	2
WC	(United States) H Baptiste	6^{1}	4
(Russia) O Selekhmeteva	7^{7}	6
(United States) E Mandlik	6	7^{7}
(France) D Parry	3	6^{1}
Q	(Ukraine) D Lopatetska	1	6	7
6	(Denmark) C Tauson	6	2	5

Third round
1	(United States) C Gauff	6	6
(Russia) O Selekhmeteva	3	0
(United States) E Mandlik	5	4
Q	(Ukraine) D Lopatetska	7	6

Quarterfinals
1	(United States) C Gauff	4	6	2
Q	(Ukraine) D Lopatetska	6	3	6

==== Section 2 ====
First round
3	(China) Wang Xiyu	6	6
WC	(United States) Emma Navarro	3	3
(Russia) Kamilla Rakhimova	6	4	6
(United States) Peyton Stearns	4	6	4
(Slovakia) Lenka Stará	2	6	6
(France) Manon Léonard	6	4	3
(Malta) Francesca Curmi	3	4
16	(United States) Lea Ma	6	6
9	(Japan) Naho Sato	6	6
(United States) Dalayna Hewitt	3	2
(Republic of Ireland) Georgia Drummy	7	6
Q	(Russia) Anastasia Tikhonova	5	4
Q	(United States) Emma Jackson	6	6
(Ukraine) Viktoriia Dema	3	3
(France) Loudmilla Bencheikh	6	4	3
5	(United States) Caty McNally	3	6	6

Second round
3	(China) Xiy Wang	6	6
(Russia) K Rakhimova	3	3
(Slovakia) L Stará	5	0
16	(United States) L Ma	7	6
9	(Japan) N Sato	4	6	6
(Republic of Ireland) G Drummy	6	4	2
Q	(United States) E Jackson	3	4
5	(United States) C McNally	6	6

Third round
3	(China) Xiy Wang	6	6
16	(United States) L Ma	1	1
9	(Japan) N Sato	7	6
5	(United States) C McNally	5	4

Quarterfinals
3	(China) Xiy Wang	7^{7}	6
9	(Japan) N Sato	6^{5}	2

=== Bottom half ===
==== Section 3 ====
First round
8	(Canada) Leylah Annie Fernandez	3	6	6
WC	(United States) Elysia Bolton	6	3	4
(France) Mylène Halemai	6^{3}	7	6
(Thailand) Thasaporn Naklo	7^{7}	5	6^{r}
(Russia) Taisya Pachkaleva	7^{7}	2	6
WC	(United States) Abigail Forbes	6^{5}	6	4
(Latvia) Kamilla Bartone	6	6
10	(Argentina) María Lourdes Carlé	3	2
15	(United States) Katie Volynets	3	4
Q	(Ukraine) Daria Snigur	6	6
(Japan) Moyuka Uchijima	6	6
(Georgia (country)) Mariam Dalakishvili	4	1
WC	(United States) Vanessa Ong	1	3
(Hungary) Adrienn Nagy	6	6
(United States) Natasha Subhash	6^{5}	5
4	(Colombia) Camila Osorio	7^{7}	7

Second round
8	(Canada) LA Fernandez	6	6
(France) M Halemai	2	2
(Russia) T Pachkaleva	7	6
(Latvia) K Bartone	5	2
Q	(Ukraine) D Snigur	0	4
(Japan) M Uchijima	6	6
(Hungary) A Nagy	4	2
4	(Colombia) C Osorio	6	6

Third round
8	(Canada) LA Fernandez	6	7^{7}
(Russia) T Pachkaleva	2	6^{4}
(Japan) M Uchijima	6	2	4
4	(Colombia) C Osorio	3	6	6

Quarterfinals
8	(Canada) LA Fernandez	6	3	2
4	(Colombia) C Osorio	3	6	6

==== Section 4 ====
First round
7	(Luxembourg) Eléonora Molinaro	3	3
Q	(Japan) Himari Satō	6	6
(United States) Gabriella Price	4	6^{3}
(Papua New Guinea) Violet Apisah	6	7^{7}
WC	(United States) Salma Ewing	5	2
Q	(Thailand) Mananchaya Sawangkaew	7	6
(Burundi) Sada Nahimana	2	4
11	(France) Clara Burel	6	6
14	(China) Zheng Qinwen	7^{7}	6
WC	(United States) Fiona Crawley	6^{4}	2
Q	(United States) Hurricane Tyra Black	6	6
Q	(Belgium) Victoria Kalaitzis	2	4
(Ukraine) Margaryta Bilokin	3	1
(United Kingdom) Emma Raducanu	6	6
(France) Yasmine Mansouri	7	5	5
2	(United States) Alexa Noel	5	7	7

Second round
Q	(Japan) H Sato	4	3
(Papua New Guinea) V Apisah	6	6
Q	(Thailand) M Sawangkaew	6	3	2
11	(France) C Burel	4	6	6
14	(China) Q Zheng	6	3	7
Q	(United States) HT Black	4	6	5
(United Kingdom) E Raducanu	6	6
2	(United States) A Noel	0	1

Third round
(Papua New Guinea) V Apisah	4	6	1
11	(France) C Burel	6	2	6
14	(China) Q Zheng	6^{6}	1
(United Kingdom) E Raducanu	7^{8}	6

Quarterfinals
11	(France) C Burel	6	6
(United Kingdom) E Raducanu	2	0

== Qualifying ==
=== Seeds ===
1. (Hong Kong) Cody Wong Hong-yi (qualifying competition)
2. (United States) Hurricane Tyra Black (qualified)
3. (Thailand) Mananchaya Sawangkaew (qualified)
4. (Poland) Stefania Rogozińska Dzik (first round)
5. (Ukraine) Daria Snigur (qualified)
6. (Japan) Himari Sato (qualified)
7. (Russia) Daria Frayman (qualifying competition)
8. (Ukraine) Daria Lopatetska (qualified)
9. (Russia) Anastasia Tikhonova (qualified)
10. (Colombia) Laura Sofía Rico García (first round)
11. (Italy) Federica Sacco (qualifying competition)
12. (United States) Kacie Harvey (first round)
13. (Italy) Melania Delai (first round)
14. (United States) Chloe Beck (first round)
15. (Bulgaria) Daniella Dimitrova (qualifying competition)
16. (Switzerland) Joanne Züger (first round)

=== Qualifiers ===
1. (United States) Emma Jackson
2. (United States) Hurricane Tyra Black
3. (Thailand) Mananchaya Sawangkaew
4. (Russia) Anastasia Tikhonova
5. (Ukraine) Daria Snigur
6. (Japan) Himari Sato
7. (Belgium) Victoria Kalaitzis
8. (Ukraine) Daria Lopatetska

=== Draw ===
==== First qualifier ====
First round
1	(Hong Kong) Cody Wong Hong-yi	6	6
(Italy) Lisa Pigato	3	4
WC	(United States) Emma Jackson	6	4	7
16	(Switzerland) Joanne Züger	3	6	5

Qualifying competition
1	(Hong Kong) Cody Wong Hong-yi	5	6^{3}
WC	(United States) Emma Jackson	7	7^{7}

==== Second qualifier ====
First round
2	(United States) Hurricane Tyra Black	6	6
(Italy) Martina Biagianti	4	4
(Japan) Mana Kawamura	2	2
15	(Bulgaria) Daniella Dimitrova	6	6

Qualifying competition
2	(United States) Hurricane Tyra Black	6	7
15	(Bulgaria) Daniella Dimitrova	1	5

==== Third qualifier ====
First round
3	(Thailand) Mananchaya Sawangkaew	6	3	6
WC	(United States) Alexandra Yepifanova	3	6	4
WC	(Japan) Kisa Yoshioka	4	0
11	(Italy) Federica Sacco	6	6

Qualifying competition
3	(Thailand) Mananchaya Sawangkaew	6	6
11	(Italy) Federica Sacco	2	4

==== Fourth qualifier ====
First round
4	(Poland) Stefania Rogozińska Dzik	1	3
(Denmark) Hannah Viller Møller	6	6
WC	(United States) Katrina Scott	6^{9}	2
9	(Russia) Anastasia Tikhonova	7^{11}	6

Qualifying competition
(Denmark) Hannah Viller Møller	2	1
9	(Russia) Anastasia Tikhonova	6	6

==== Fifth qualifier ====
First round
5	(Ukraine) Daria Snigur	6	6
WC	(United States) Robin Montgomery	3	3
(Italy) Federica Rossi	6	6
12	(United States) Kacie Harvey	3	3

Qualifying competition
5	(Ukraine) Daria Snigur	7^{7}	6
(Italy) Federica Rossi	6^{2}	3

==== Sixth qualifier ====
First round
6	(Japan) Himari Sato	7	6
WC	(United States) Reese Brantmeier	5	2
(New Zealand) Valentina Ivanov	6	6
10	(Colombia) Laura Sofía Rico García	4	3

Qualifying competition
6	(Japan) Himari Sato	7^{9}	7
(New Zealand) Valentina Ivanov	6^{7}	5

==== Seventh qualifier ====
First round
7	(Russia) Daria Frayman	6	4	6
(United States) Savannah Broadus	0	6	4
(Belgium) Victoria Kalaitzis	6	6
13	(Italy) Melania Delai	1	4

Qualifying competition
7	(Russia) Daria Frayman	4	6^{7}
(Belgium) Victoria Kalaitzis	6	7^{9}

==== Eighth qualifier ====
First round
8	(Ukraine) Daria Lopatetska	6	6
(Poland) Weronika Falkowska	2	1
(Canada) Alexandra Vagramov	6	6
14	(United States) Chloe Beck	2	1

Qualifying competition
8	(Ukraine) Daria Lopatetska	6	2	6
(Canada) Alexandra Vagramov	4	6	4
