= 2018 US Open – Wheelchair men's singles =

Wheelchair men's singles
- 2018 US Open

Final
- Champion: (United Kingdom) Alfie Hewett
- Runner-up: (Japan) Shingo Kunieda
- Score: 6–3, 7–5

Events
Singles	men	women		boys	girls
Doubles	men	women	mixed	boys	girls
WC Singles	men	women	quad
WC Doubles	men	women	quad
Legends	men	women	mixed
← 2017 ·	US Open	· 2019 →

Alfie Hewett defeated Shingo Kunieda in the final, 6–3, 7–5 to win the men's singles wheelchair tennis title at the 2018 US Open. It was his first US Open singles title and second major singles title overall.

Stéphane Houdet was the defending champion, but was defeated by Nicolas Peifer in the quarterfinals.

Hewitt was just the second man, after Houdet, to beat Kunieda in a major final. In Kunieda’s first 25 major finals, Houdet had beaten him 3 times, once in 2012 and twice in 2013.

== Seeds ==
1. (Japan) Shingo Kunieda (final)
2. (United Kingdom) Alfie Hewett (champion)

== Draw ==
Key

- Q = Qualifier
- WC = Wild card
- LL = Lucky loser
- Alt = Alternate
- ITF = ITF entry
- PR = Protected ranking
- SR = Special ranking
- SE = Special exempt
- JE = Junior exempt
- JR = Junior Accelerator Programme entrant
- CO = College Accelerator Programme entrant
- NG = Next Gen Accelerator Program entrant
- w/o = Walkover
- r = Retired
- d = Defaulted

=== Bracket ===
Quarterfinals
1	(Japan) Shingo Kunieda	0	6	6
(Sweden) Stefan Olsson	6	1	3
(France) Stéphane Houdet	2	2
WC	(France) Nicolas Peifer	6	6
(United Kingdom) Gordon Reid	1	4
(Argentina) Gustavo Fernández	6	6
(Belgium) Joachim Gérard	5	4
2	(United Kingdom) Alfie Hewett	7	6

Semifinals
1	(Japan) Shingo Kunieda	2	6	7
WC	(France) Nicolas Peifer	6	4	5
(Argentina) Gustavo Fernández	6^{2}	1
2	(United Kingdom) Alfie Hewett	7^{7}	6

Final
1	(Japan) Shingo Kunieda	3	5
2	(United Kingdom) Alfie Hewett	6	7
