= List of tennis code violations =

Under the Rules and Regulations of Tennis, when a player violates a rule or does not follow the tennis code of conduct, the umpire or tournament official can issue one of the following (Section IV, Article C, Item 18 – "Unsportsmanlike Conduct"):

- "Point Penalty"
- "Suspension Point"

Generally, this results in the following escalation:

- First offense: Warning
- Second offense: Loss of a point
- Third (and each subsequent) offense: Loss of a game

After the third offense, it is up to the chair umpire (1%) but mostly tournament supervisor (99%) whether this constitutes a Default/Disqualification.

This is outside of any "off-court" issues related to a player's attire, behavior at media conferences, drug use, etc.

== Selected period code violation summary ==
The New York Times compiled a list of fines received by gender between 1998 and 2018 at the four major tennis grand slam tournaments.

Fine	Men	Women
Racket abuse	646	99
Audible obscenity	344	140
Unsportsmanlike conduct	287	67
Coaching	87	152
Ball abuse	50	35
Verbal abuse	62	16
Visible obscenity	20	11
No press	6	10
Time violations	7	3
Best effort	2	0
Default	3	0
Doubles attire	2	1
Late for match	1	1
First round retirement	2	0
Total	1519	535

== List of disqualifications ==
This is a list of code violations that resulted in a player or doubles team being disqualified from the tournament.

=== ATP Tour ===
Tournament	Player(s)	Opponent(s)	Reason
1976 Indian Wells, USA	Ilie Năstase	Roscoe Tanner	Defaulted for leaving the court.
1988 Cincinnati Open, USA	Andrés Gómez	Carl Limberger	Two audible obscenities, hitting the court microphone and smashing his racket against the court.
1990 Australian Open, Australia	John McEnroe	Mikael Pernfors	Three consecutive code violations. Received a warning for unsportsmanlike conduct after intimidating a lineswoman, a second warning for racquet abuse, and was disqualified after verbally abusing the chair umpire Gerry Armstrong. McEnroe was fined US$6,500.
1995 French Open, France	Carsten Arriens	Brett Steven	Hitting a linesman with a thrown racket.
1995 Wimbledon, UK	Tim Henman / Jeremy Bates	Jeff Tarango / Henrik Holm	Both were disqualified after Henman hit a ball girl with a ball.
1995 Wimbledon, UK	Jeff Tarango	Alexander Mronz	Telling spectators to "shut up" earned a violation, and a second one after he called the chair umpire the "most corrupt official in the game" before walking off the court. Tarango was fined £28,000 and banned from the tournament the following year
1995 US Open, USA	Shuzo Matsuoka	Petr Korda	Delay of play after collapsing from severe cramping in his thighs. He was not allowed to receive medical attention without forfeiting the match under the rules at the time. The incident led to a change in the rules of professional tennis to allow players to receive medical treatment during matches.
1996 Indianapolis Open, USA	Andre Agassi	Daniel Nestor	Ball abuse and verbal abuse.
1997 Miami Open, USA	Mariano Zabaleta	Adrian Voinea	Disqualified over hitting a line judge with a ball.
2000 French Open, France	Stefan Koubek	Attila Sávolt	Hitting a ball boy.
2000 Los Angeles Open, USA	Marcelo Ríos	Gouichi Motomura	Swearing at the chair umpire. Subsequently, fined US$5,000.
2005 Miami Open, USA	Xavier Malisse	David Ferrer	Aggravated behaviour (Hitting a line judge and insulting her).
2007 Open de Moselle, France	Stefan Koubek (2)	Sébastien Grosjean	Directing abusive language towards the tournament supervisor while disputing a call.
2012 Queen's Club Championships, UK	David Nalbandian	Marin Čilić	Injuring an official after kicking an advertising board.
2016 Savannah Challenger, USA	Daniil Medvedev	Donald Young	Disqualified over 'question[ing] the impartiality of the umpire based on her race,' the US Tennis Association said.
2017 Davis Cup World Group, Canada	Denis Shapovalov	Kyle Edmund	Hitting the chair umpire with a ball hit in anger.
2017 US Open, USA	Fabio Fognini	Stefano Travaglia	Fine: $24,000/$96,000; verbal abuse to Chair Umpire. Defaulted from doubles match.
2018 Swiss Open, Switzerland	Yann Marti	Adrian Bodmer	Pointing racquet at Severin Lüthi and saying to him: "You can put that in your butt."
2019 Italian Open, Italy	Nick Kyrgios	Casper Ruud	Multiple offenses throughout the match, including ball abuse, offensive language directed at spectators, racket slamming, and tossing a chair onto the court; because of the default, Kyrgios was fined €33,635 plus the cost of his hotel accommodation and lost all ATP points earned for the tournament.
2020 US Open, USA	Novak Djokovic	Pablo Carreño Busta	Hitting a lineswoman with a ball hit in anger.
2021 Mexican Open, Mexico	Damir Džumhur	Botic van de Zandschulp	Leaving the court after continued disputes with the umpire earned him a point penalty.
2021 Barcelona Open, Spain	Fabio Fognini (2)	Bernabé Zapata Miralles	Alleged "Verbal obscenity" against a line judge.
2022 Adelaide International, Australia	Corentin Moutet	Laslo Djere	Verbal obscenity against the chair umpire.
2022 Mexican Open, Mexico	Alexander Zverev	Lloyd Glasspool / Harri Heliövaara	Fined $40,000 ($20,000 for verbal abuse and $20,000 for unsportsmanlike conduct after smashing the racket into the umpire's chair). Defaulted from singles match.
2023 Lyon Open, France	Mikael Ymer	Arthur Fils	Hitting the umpire's chair with racket twice in anger; fined a total of €37,370 ($40,000) for his behavior.
2023 Shanghai Masters, China	Marc Polmans	Stefano Napolitano	Hitting the ball to umpire in anger when missed first match point.
2024 Dubai Tennis Championships, UAE	Andrey Rublev	Alexander Bublik	Verbal abuse, screaming in the face of a line judge.
2024 Mubadala Citi DC Open, USA	Denis Shapovalov (2)	Ben Shelton	Offensive language directed at a spectator.
2026 China Open, China	Daniil Medvedev (2)	Novak Djokovic	Hitting spectator with ball.

=== WTA Tour ===
Tournament	Player	Opponent	Reason
1996 Palermo Ladies Open, Italy	Irina Spîrlea	Stephanie Devillé	Abusive language directed at an official.
2007 Cincinnati Masters, USA	Anastasia Rodionova	Angelique Kerber	Hitting a ball at spectators cheering Kerber
2023 French Open, France	Miyu Kato / Aldila Sutjiadi	Sara Sorribes Tormo / Marie Bouzková	The pair were defaulted after a shot from Kato accidentally hit a ball girl.

== Other notable violations ==
Tournament	Player	Opponent	Violation
1984 Stockholm Open, Sweden	John McEnroe	Anders Järryd	Fined $2,100 for unsportsmanlike conduct
1984 Stockholm Open, Sweden	John McEnroe	Mats Wilander	Assessed a warning for verbal abuse. After the tournament, the Men's International Professional Tennis Council suspended McEnroe 42 days for misconduct
1987 US Open, USA	John McEnroe	Slobodan Živojinović	Fined $17,500 and suspended two months; After a series of arguments with the chair umpire that included penalties for unsportsmanlike behavior, verbal abuse, and language directed at a spectator,
1990 US Open, USA	Andre Agassi	Petr Korda	Called chair umpire a "son of a bitch" and spit on him. Agassi was assessed a penalty point, which was later rescinded as the spit was considered accidental. Agassi was still fined $3,000
1996 US Open, USA	Pete Sampras	Àlex Corretja	Time violation for vomiting court side during the match
1998 Sydney Seniors, Australia	John McEnroe	Mikael Pernfors	Received a warning for verbal abuse
2009 US Open, USA	Roger Federer	Juan Martín del Potro	Fined $1,500 for outburst against umpire Jake Garner, in a row about the time taken to challenge by his opponent.
2009 US Open, USA	Serena Williams	Kim Clijsters	Fined $10,500/$175,000: Received a foot fault and subsequently argued with a linesperson, which led to a code violation and a point penalty while she was a match point down, thus ending the match.
2010 Wimbledon, UK	Victor Hănescu	Daniel Brands	Fined $21,500; spitting on spectators.
2011	Daniel Köllerer	-	Banned for life; match fixing.
2011 US Open, USA	Serena Williams	Sam Stosur	Received a code violation for verbal abuse after chair umpire Eva Asderaki warned her for hindrance. She was on probation for the 2009 offense at the same tournament.
2014 Wimbledon, UK	Fabio Fognini	Alex Kuznetsov	Fined $27,500 damaging the court, then extra $7,500 for abuse of tournament official (and obscene gesture).
2016 Istanbul Open, Turkey	Grigor Dimitrov	Diego Schwartzman	Smashed racquet three times, resulting in a warning, a point penalty, and another point penalty
2016 Wimbledon, UK	Pablo Cuevas/Marcel Granollers	Jonathan Marray/Adil Shamasdin	Fined $9,000; throwing a ball out of the court and trying to urinate on court. Granollers was fined $7,500 for protesting too much.
2016 Wimbledon, UK	Heather Watson	Annika Beck	Fined $12,000; 2nd largest in Tournament history; for smashing racket into the grass.
2016 Wimbledon, UK	Serena Williams	Christina McHale	Fined $10,000; for smashing racket into the grass.
2016 Wimbledon, UK	Viktor Troicki	Albert Ramos Viñolas	Fined $10,000; for calling the umpire, Damiano Torella, the "Worst umpire ever in the world".
2017 Wimbledon, UK	Daniil Medvedev	Ruben Bemelmans	Fined $26,000; three conduct violations and throwing coins at the umpire's chair.
2017 Fed Cup World Group II Play-offs, Romania	Ilie Năstase	(coach)	Fine $10,000 with 4-year ban; Various offenses; swearing, sexual advances, and remarks about Serena Williams' unborn child.
2018 US Open, USA	Alizé Cornet	Johanna Larsson	Received a warning for changing her shirt mid-match.
2018 US Open Final, USA	Serena Williams	Naomi Osaka	Fined $17,000 for arguing against chair umpire Carlos Ramos for code offenses involving coaching and a racket slam, and impugning umpire's integrity.
2019 Wimbledon, UK	Anna Tatishvili	-	Fined total purse: $51,500 for "not playing up to standards".
2019 Wimbledon, UK	Serena Williams	-	Fined $10,000 for damaging a Wimbledon practice court with her racquet.
2019 Wimbledon, UK	Fabio Fognini	Tennys Sandgren	Fined $3,000 for saying he wished "a bomb would explode at the club".
2019 Wimbledon, UK	Bernard Tomic	Jo-Wilfried Tsonga	Fined $80,000 for "not playing up to the required standards".
2019 Cincinnati Masters, USA	Nick Kyrgios	Karen Khachanov	Fined $113,000 after his meltdown, which included persistent abuse of an umpire, breaking his racquets and leaving the court.
2019 US Open, USA	Mike Bryan	Federico Delbonis / Roberto Carballés	Fined $10,000 for pointing his racquet at an official, imitating shooting a rifle.
2019 US Open, USA	Daniil Medvedev	-	Multiple violations by Medvedev; incurring ~$19,000 in fines.
2020 Australian Open, Australia	Roger Federer	Tennys Sandgren	Fined $3,000 for audible obscenity in the quarter-final match. Federer received a code violation when a line judge reported him to the umpire, Marijana Veljovic.
2020 Australian Open, Australia	Novak Djokovic	Dominic Thiem	No fine: back-to-back time violations; touching Chair Umpire.
2021 Australian Open, Australia	Karolína Plíšková	Karolína Muchová	Received a racket abuse warning and later was deducted a point for smashing another racket in the locker room during the break between the first and second sets.
2021 French Open, France	Naomi Osaka	Patricia Maria Țig	Fined $15,000 for not honoring her Media Obligations (Article III, Section H of the Code of Conduct).
2022 Indian Wells Masters, USA	Nick Kyrgios	Rafael Nadal	Fined $25,000 ($5,000 for audible obscenity against the chair umpire and $20,000 for unsportsmanlike conduct after nearly hitting the ball boy after smashing his racket).
2022 Miami Open, USA	Nick Kyrgios	Jannik Sinner	Fined $35,000 ($5,000 for audible obscenity, $10,000 for unsportsmanlike conduct after smashing his racket against the bench and berating the chair umpire Carlos Bernardes and $20,000 for verbal abuse against the officials).
2022 Italian Open, Italy	Denis Shapovalov	Lorenzo Sonego	Received a point penalty for unsportsmanlike conduct after crossing the net to check the mark, and later a game penalty for yelling "shut the f*** up" at spectators; the latter resulting in an $8,000 fine.
2022 French Open, France	Andrey Rublev	Kwon Soon-woo	Fined $8,000 for smacking the ball and throwing drink on-court in anger. Rublev avoided being defaulted as the ball narrowly missed the groundsman near him.
2022 French Open, France	Irina-Camelia Begu	Ekaterina Alexandrova	Fined $10,000 for throwing her racket onto the court. The racket then bounced into the stands, but Begu avoided being defaulted as it did not hit anyone.
2022 Wimbledon, UK	Nick Kyrgios	Paul Jubb	Fined $10,000 for spitting towards a spectator at the end of the match.
2022 Wimbledon, UK	Nick Kyrgios	Stefanos Tsitsipas	Both were fined; Tsitsipas was fined $10,000 for two instances of ball abuse (one almost hitting a spectator), while Kyrgios was fined $4,000 for cursing.
2022 US Open, USA	Nick Kyrgios	Benjamin Bonzi	Fined $7,500 for spitting towards his players' box and cursing during the match.
2022 US Open, USA	Nick Kyrgios	Karen Khachanov	Fined $14,000 for smashing two rackets after loss.
2023 Madrid Open, Spain	Hugo Gaston	Borna Ćorić	Fined €144,000 ($155,000) for intentionally throwing a ball on the court in attempt to replay the point.
2023 Wimbledon, UK	Novak Djokovic	Carlos Alcaraz	Fined $8,000 for smashing racket into the net post in the fifth set.
2024 Shanghai, China	Frances Tiafoe	Roman Safiullin	Fined $120,000 ($60,000 for verbal abuse, $60,000 for aggravated behavior) for repeatedly obscene cursing towards the umpire after being issued a time violation in the deciding third set tiebreak.
