= Patrick Mouratoglou =

French tennis coach (born 1970)

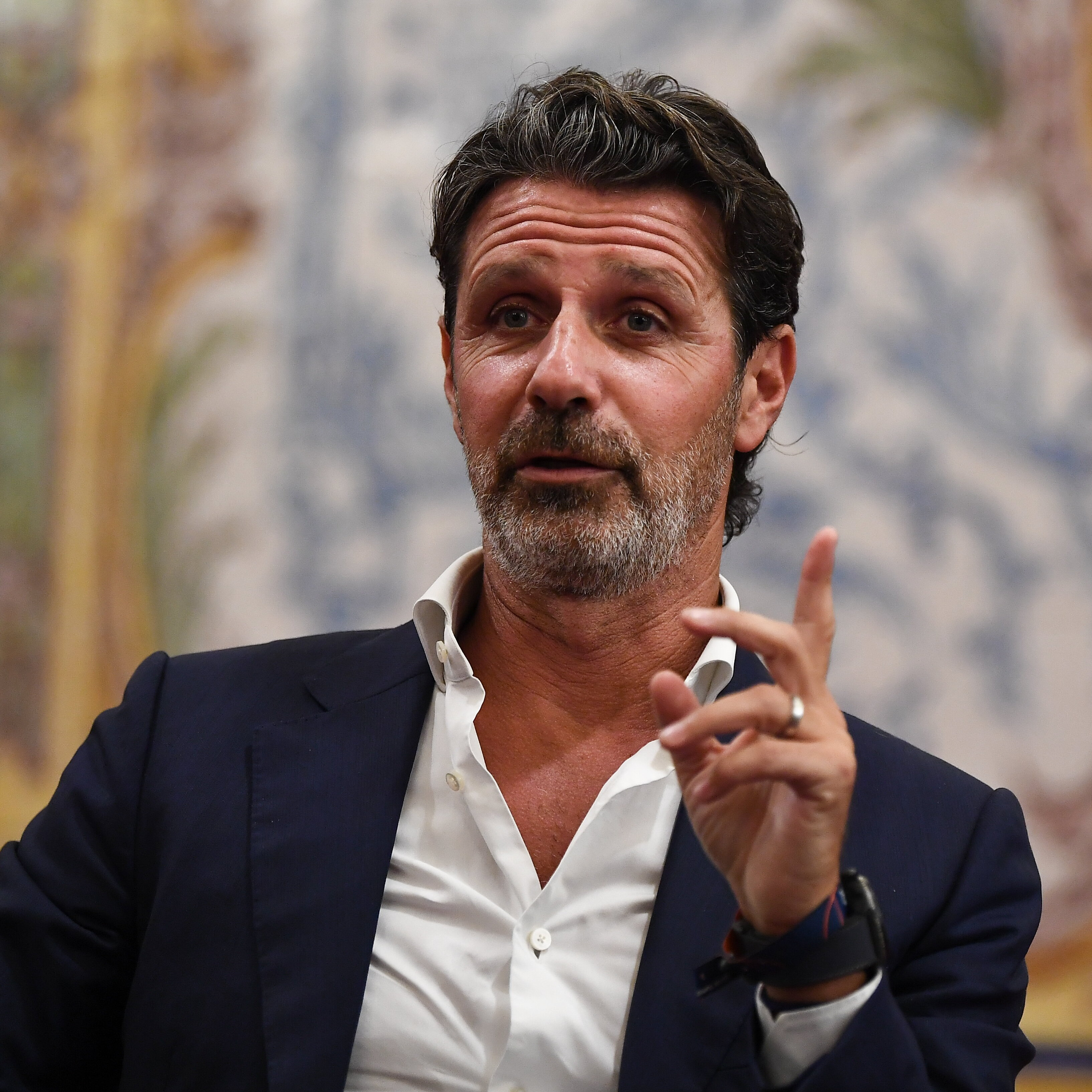
- Mouratoglou at Web Summit in 2021
- Full name: Patrick Jean André Mouratoglou
- Born: 8 June 1970 (age 56) Neuilly-sur-Seine, France
- Official website: patrickmouratoglou.com

Coaching career (1999–)
- Marcos Baghdatis (1999–2006); Anastasia Pavlyuchenkova (2007–2009); Aravane Rezaï (2009–2010); Yanina Wickmayer (2009–2012); Laura Robson (2010–2011); Jérémy Chardy (2012); Grigor Dimitrov (2012); Serena Williams (2012–2022); Stefanos Tsitsipas (2018–2021); Simona Halep (2022–2023); Holger Rune (2022–2024); Naomi Osaka (2024–2025)

Coaching achievements
- Coachee singles titles total: 36
- Coachee doubles titles total: 4
- List of notable tournaments (with champion): Career Golden Slam (Williams); Non-Calendar Year Grand Slam (Williams); 2x Australian Open (Williams); 2x French Open (Williams); 3x Wimbledon (Williams); 3x US Open (Williams); 2012 Olympic Gold Medal (Williams); 3x WTA Tour Championships (Williams); 10x WTA Premier Mandatory & Premier 5 (Rezaï, Williams, Halep); ATP Masters 1000 (Rune)
- Last updated on: 14 April 2024.

Patrick Jean André Mouratoglou (born 8 June 1970) is a French tennis coach, sports commentator, and businessman. He founded the Mouratoglou Tennis Academy in 1996, and has since coached many up-and-coming players, including Marcos Baghdatis, Anastasia Pavlyuchenkova, Aravane Rezaï, Jérémy Chardy, Laura Robson, Yanina Wickmayer, Grigor Dimitrov, and Holger Rune. He served as the coach of Serena Williams from 2012 to 2022.

== Early life ==
Mouratoglou was born in Neuilly-sur-Seine, France, to a Greek father and a French mother. His father, Pâris Mouratoglou, is the founder of EDF Énergies Nouvelles. Mouratoglou played tennis from the age of four with the hopes of turning professional. His parents, however, dissuaded him from pursuing tennis seriously, believing it to be a "risky" career.

== Coaching career ==
=== 1996–2007: Founding the Mouratoglou Tennis Academy ===
Mouratoglou was inspired to start a tennis academy after being unable to pursue a tennis career in his teens, stating, "I wanted to offer young people the chance I didn’t have when I was 15 or 16, when I was a very good tennis player with ambitions to turn pro. I wasn’t given a chance so it became a goal of mine to give many young people a chance." He was inspired by the model of Nick Bollettieri's academy.

In 1996, Mouratoglou convinced veteran coach Bob Brett to start a tennis academy together in Montreuil, originally named the Bob Brett Academy. The two partnered together for six years, with Brett teaching Mouratoglou the basics of coaching. After Brett left the academy, Mouratoglou changed its name to the Mouratoglou Tennis Academy, and it was eventually relocated to Biot, on the French Riviera, in 2016.

Mouratoglou began coaching players on the professional tour in 1999. He began coaching 14-year-old Marcos Baghdatis after inviting him to his academy in October 1999 on a one-week basis. Baghdatis was, according to Mouratoglou, "not an athlete at all." However, within seven years, Baghdatis would become a junior world No. 1, win the 2003 Australian Open boys' title, reach the final of the 2006 Australian Open, and reach a career-high ATP singles ranking of world No. 8.

=== 2007–2012: Rise in prominence ===
In July 2007, Mouratoglou began coaching 16-year-old Anastasia Pavlyuchenkova. Within two years, Pavlyuchenkova reached the WTA top 30. Mouratoglou and Pavlyuchenkova ended their partnership in August 2009, and Mouratoglou moved on to coaching both Aravane Rezaï and Yanina Wickmayer. Rezaï enjoyed a successful 2010 season, entering the world top 20 and winning the 2010 Madrid Open, whilst Wickmayer reached a career-high ranking of world No. 12 in April 2010. Mouratoglou stopped working with Rezaï and Wickmayer in August 2010 and April 2012, respectively.

In December 2010, Mouratoglou began coaching 16-year-old Laura Robson, who was world No. 217 at the time and still struggling to break into the senior tour. Mouratoglou and Robson worked together for six months before separating shortly before the 2011 Wimbledon Championships, with Robson still struggling to make any progress on the WTA Tour. During this same period, Mouratoglou also coached Jérémy Chardy within his academy. Their partnership ended after roughly eight years.

=== 2012–2022: Coaching Serena Williams ===
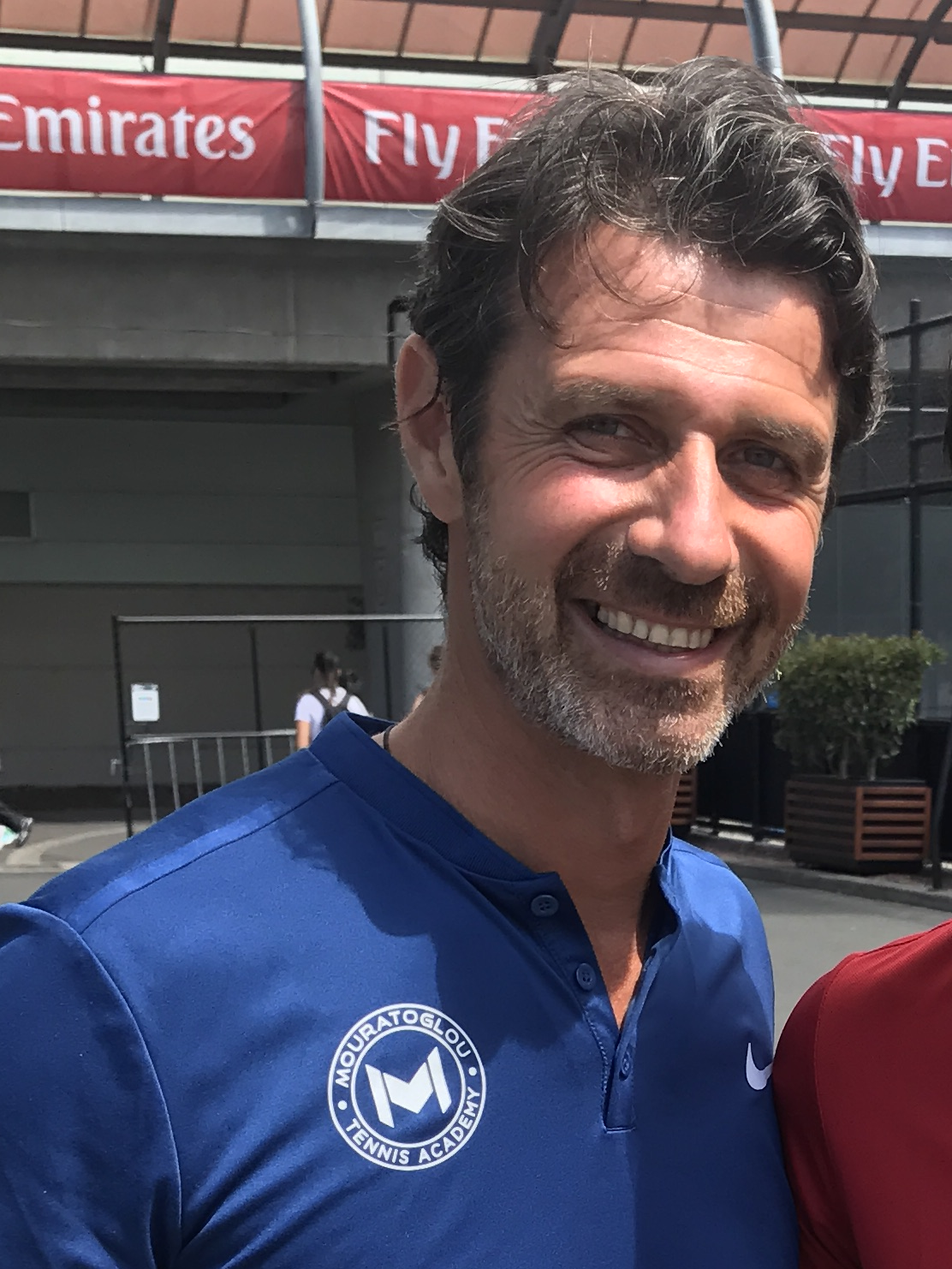
Mouratoglou in 2017

In March 2012, Mouratoglou began coaching Grigor Dimitrov and set about guiding him back into the ATP top 100, having dropped to No. 102 by the time their partnership began. This partnership ended in September of that year, when Mouratoglou moved on to coaching Serena Williams.

Mouratoglou began coaching Williams after she had suffered her first-ever opening-round defeat in the main draw of a Grand Slam tournament, losing in the first round of the 2012 French Open. During their partnership, Mouratoglou coached Williams to her fifth, sixth and seventh Wimbledon titles, the Olympic gold medal, her fourth, fifth, and sixth US Open titles, her second and third French Open titles, three consecutive year-end championships titles, her sixth and seventh Australian Open title, and lifted her back to No. 1 in the WTA rankings.

In 2014, Mouratoglou invited 10-year-old Coco Gauff to train at his academy, stating, "She impressed me with her determination, athleticism and fighting spirit." In 2015, Stefanos Tsitsipas also began training at the academy, coached by Mouratoglou and his father Apostolos.

=== 2022–present: Coaching Simona Halep and Holger Rune ===
In spring 2022, Simona Halep began training with Mouratoglou. In October 2022, as a result of Halep's doping suspension and absence from the WTA Tour, Mouratoglou began coaching 19-year-old Holger Rune. Under Mouratoglou's coaching, Rune won his first Masters 1000 title, defeating Novak Djokovic in the final of the 2022 Paris Masters. On 3 April 2023, Rune announced his split with Mouratoglou after six months together. However, they continued to collaborate only a few weeks later, and subsequently resumed their previous coaching relationship. At the end of August 2023, however, Rune again announced his split with Mouratoglou after almost twelve months together. Later, on 21 February 2024, Rune and Mouratoglou reunited once again after Boris Becker and Severin Lüthi chose to stop working with Rune. Rune and Mouratoglou parted ways for a third time on 29 July 2024.

== Other ventures ==
Mouratoglou has worked as a guest commentator for ESPN and Eurosport.

In 2007, Mouratoglou published a book titled Éduquer pour gagner. In 2015, he published an autobiography titled Le coach. In 2019, he launched a mobile game called Tennis Manager.

In 2014, he launched the Champ'seed Foundation to support young tennis players who lack the financial resources to succeed professionally. Players supported by the foundation include Coco Gauff, Stefanos Tsitsipas, Holger Rune, Lorenzo Musetti, Alexei Popyrin, Linda Fruhvirtová, and Brenda Fruhvirtová.

In 2017, Mouratoglou, along with Michaël Jérémiasz and Cédric Mocellin, founded the French Riviera Open, an annual wheelchair tennis tournament held at the Mouratoglou Tennis Academy. In 2020, Mouratoglou and businessman Alex Popyrin (father of tennis player Alexei Popyrin) created the Ultimate Tennis Showdown (UTS), an exhibition tennis tournament originally held at the Mouratoglou Tennis Academy. When asked why he created UTS, Mouratoglou stated, "I do this because I feel that tennis needs to reinvent itself. And when your fan base is 61 years old and gets one year older every year, you have to start to worry and try to find solutions." After a two-year hiatus, UTS returned in 2023.

Mouratoglou was featured in the fourth episode of the 2020 Netflix docuseries The Playbook.

== Personal life ==
Mouratoglou has three children with his ex-wife, Clarisse: a son named Raphaël and two daughters named Charlotte and Juliette. He also has two daughters with his second wife, Ada.

== Controversies ==
=== 2018 US Open final ===
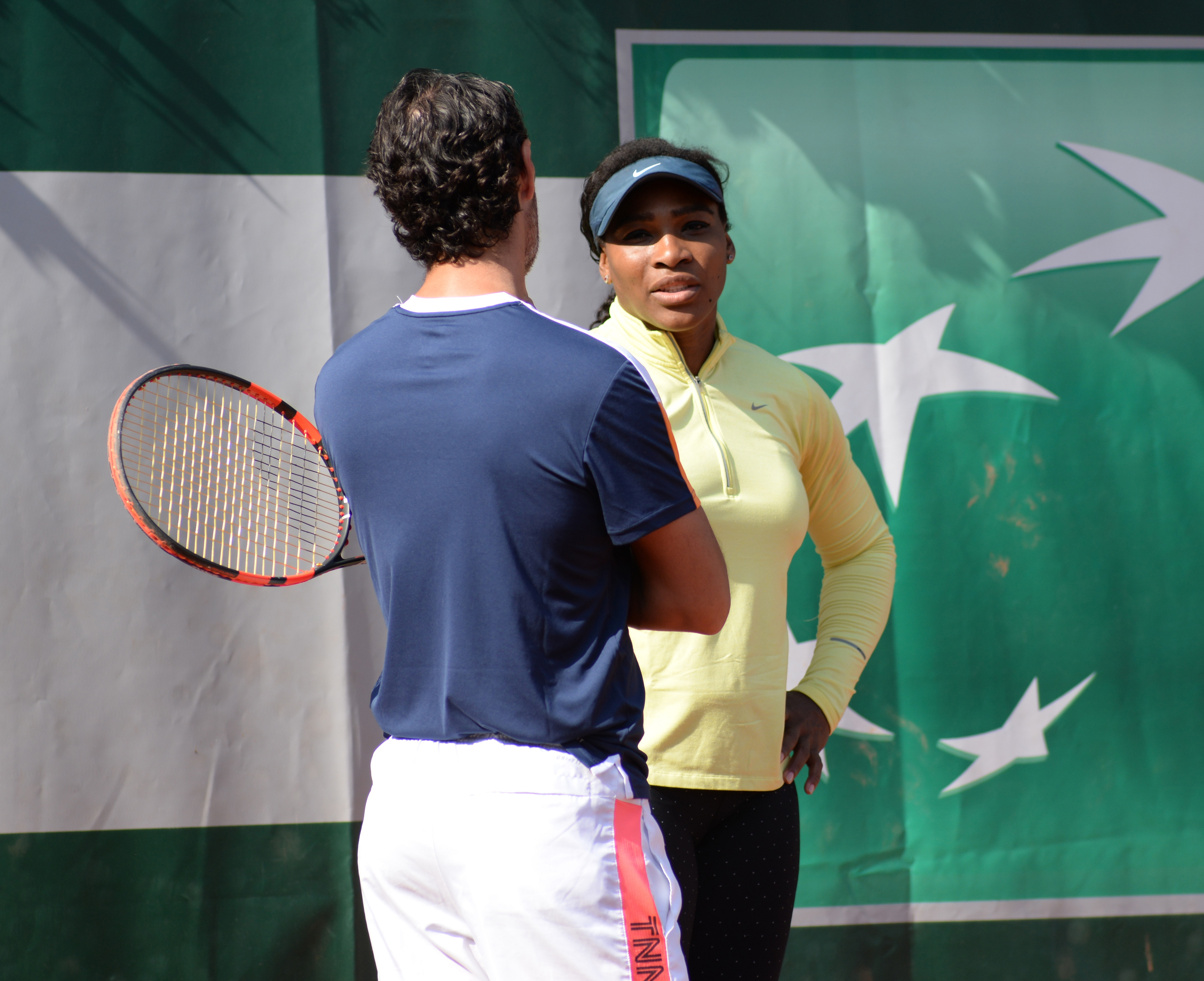
Mouratoglou and Serena Williams in 2015

During the women's singles final of the 2018 US Open, umpire Carlos Ramos gave Serena Williams a coaching warning, alleging that Mouratoglou was giving Williams hand signals during the match. This led to Williams's infamous rant where she berated Ramos and claimed that she would "rather lose" than cheat. After the match, Mouratoglou admitted to coaching, stating, "I was coaching, but I don't think [Williams] looked at me. [Naomi Osaka's] coach was coaching the whole time, too. Everyone is doing it, 100 percent of the time." In 2019, Mouratoglou stated that he did not regret giving Williams coaching during the final.

=== Simona Halep doping suspension ===
In October 2022, Mouratoglou's coachee Simona Halep received a provisional suspension by the International Tennis Integrity Agency after testing positive for the banned substance roxadustat at the 2022 US Open. Halep stated that she was "confused and betrayed" by the results, while Mouratoglou released a statement calling Halep a "model of integrity" and that he intended to "fight to prove the truth."

In September 2023, Halep's provisional suspension was upheld, and she received a four-year ban from tennis. As a result, Mouratoglou took responsibility for the failed drug test, stating that he recommended Halep take a collagen supplement and that the collagen they purchased had been contaminated with the banned substance. Halep commented, "I'm sure it wasn't done intentionally and I'm grateful [Mouratoglou] admits the mistake was his and his team's. Yes, they are the ones who gave me this food supplement. And for this error – their error – I am the only one to pay the high price: 25 years of career destroyed." Halep also stated that her trust was broken by Mouratoglou and that she had ended their coaching relationship.

In February 2024, Halep successfully appealed her ban and her suspension was reduced to nine months. In response, Mouratoglou commented that he felt "relieved for her that the truth finally prevailed." On his podcast in March 2024, Andy Roddick criticized Mouratoglou for letting Halep receive the bulk of the backlash from her suspension. Kim Clijsters also noted, "To me the biggest red flag is [Halep's] team. I have a really hard time that there is no consequence for the team, that it's just the athlete." Australian former tennis player John Millman, who had been an outspoken supporter of Halep, tweeted, "Great to see Simona eligible to play again. Don't let Patrick [Mouratoglou] anywhere near your drinks on your return!"

Sporting positions
Preceded by Richard Williams	Coach of Serena Williams; 2012–2022	Succeeded by None
