= 2017 Verrazzano Open – Doubles =

Doubles
- 2017 Verrazzano Open

Final
- Champions: (France) Tristan Lamasine (Croatia) Franko Škugor
- Runners-up: (Belarus) Uladzimir Ignatik (Slovakia) Jozef Kovalík
- Score: 6–2, 6–2

Events
Singles	Doubles
Verrazzano Open	· 2019 →

This was the first edition of the tournament.

Tristan Lamasine and Franko Škugor won the title after defeating Uladzimir Ignatik and Jozef Kovalík 6–2, 6–2 in the final.

== Seeds ==
1. (Netherlands) Wesley Koolhof / (Netherlands) Matwé Middelkoop (semifinals)
2. (United States) James Cerretani / (Austria) Philipp Oswald (first round)
3. (Germany) Andre Begemann / (Belarus) Aliaksandr Bury (quarterfinals)
4. (Russia) Mikhail Elgin / (Slovakia) Igor Zelenay (semifinals)

== Draw ==
=== Key ===
- Q = Qualifier
- WC = Wild card
- LL = Lucky loser
- Alt = Alternate
- SE = Special exempt
- PR = Protected ranking
- ITF = ITF entry
- JE = Junior exempt
- w/o = Walkover
- r = Retired
- d = Defaulted
- SR = Special ranking

First round
1	(Netherlands) W Koolhof (Netherlands) M Middelkoop	6	7^{7}
(United Kingdom) K Skupski (United Kingdom) N Skupski	1	6^{1}
WC	(France) E Benchetrit (France) L Lokoli	6^{7}	2
PR	(Croatia) M Draganja (Germany) A Satschko	7^{9}	6
3	(Germany) A Begemann (Belarus) A Bury	6	6
(Romania) M Copil (Hungary) M Fucsovics	3	4
(Belarus) U Ignatik (Slovakia) J Kovalík	4	6	[10]
(Czech Republic) R Jebavý (Czech Republic) L Rosol	6	1	[7]
WC	(France) Yanaïs Laurent (France) C Lestienne	1	2
WC	(France) H Nys (Greece) S Tsitsipas	6	6
(Slovakia) N Gombos (Italy) A Motti	4	4
4	(Russia) M Elgin (Slovakia) I Zelenay	6	6
(Australia) R Junaid (Croatia) A Šančić	5	3
(France) T Lamasine (Croatia) F Škugor	7	6
(Croatia) D Marcan (Austria) T-S Weissborn	6	5	[10]
2	(United States) J Cerretani (Austria) P Oswald	4	7	[6]

Quarterfinals
1	(Netherlands) W Koolhof (Netherlands) M Middelkoop	6	7
PR	(Croatia) M Draganja (Germany) A Satschko	2	5
3	(Germany) A Begemann (Belarus) A Bury	2	6	[13]
(Belarus) U Ignatik (Slovakia) J Kovalík	6	4	[15]
WC	(France) H Nys (Greece) S Tsitsipas	4	4
4	(Russia) M Elgin (Slovakia) I Zelenay	6	6
(France) T Lamasine (Croatia) F Škugor	3	6	[10]
(Croatia) D Marcan (Austria) T-S Weissborn	6	0	[3]

Semifinals
1	(Netherlands) W Koolhof (Netherlands) M Middelkoop	6	5	[5]
(Belarus) U Ignatik (Slovakia) J Kovalík	2	7	[10]
4	(Russia) M Elgin (Slovakia) I Zelenay	3	3
(France) T Lamasine (Croatia) F Škugor	6	6

Final
(Belarus) U Ignatik (Slovakia) J Kovalík	2	2
(France) T Lamasine (Croatia) F Škugor	6	6
