= 2017 Verrazzano Open =

- Date: 3–9 April
- Edition: 1st
- Surface: Clay
- Location: Sophia Antipolis, France
- Venue: Mouratoglou Tennis Academy

Champions

Singles
- (United Kingdom) Aljaž Bedene

Doubles
- (France) Tristan Lamasine / (Croatia) Franko Škugor
Verrazzano Open	· 2019 →

The 2017 Verrazzano Open was a professional tennis tournament played on clay courts. It was the first edition of the tournament which was part of the 2017 ATP Challenger Tour. It took place in Sophia Antipolis, France between 3 and 9 April 2017.

== Point distribution ==
Event	W	F	SF	QF	Round of 16	Round of 32	Q	Q2
Singles	90	55	33	17	8	0	5	0
Doubles	90	55	33	17	0	—	—	—

== Singles main-draw entrants ==
=== Seeds ===
Country	Player	Rank^{1}	Seed
FRA	Benoît Paire	39	1
ESP	Nicolás Almagro	56	2
ESP	Guillermo García López	90	3
GBR	Aljaž Bedene	94	4
FRA	Paul-Henri Mathieu	106	5
ROU	Marius Copil	107	6
SVK	Norbert Gombos	113	7
BEL	Arthur De Greef	125	8

- ^{1} Rankings are as of March 20, 2017.

=== Other entrants ===
The following players received wildcards into the singles main draw:

- (Israel) Yshai Oliel
- (France) Benoît Paire
- (Czech Republic) Lukáš Rosol
- (Greece) Stefanos Tsitsipas

The following player received entry into the singles main draw as a special exempt:

- (France) Corentin Moutet

The following players received entry from the qualifying draw:

- (France) Mathias Bourgue
- (Belgium) Kimmer Coppejans
- (Serbia) Filip Krajinović
- (Croatia) Franko Škugor

The following player received entry as a lucky loser:

- (France) Maxime Janvier

== Champions ==
=== Singles ===
- (United Kingdom) Aljaž Bedene def. (France) Benoît Paire 6–2, 6–2.

=== Doubles ===
- (France) Tristan Lamasine / (Croatia) Franko Škugor def. (Belarus) Uladzimir Ignatik / (Slovakia) Jozef Kovalík 6–2, 6–2.
