= Disqualification =

Disqualification may refer to:

- Ejection (sports), the removal of a participant from a contest due to a violation of the sport's rules
  - Disqualification (boxing)
  - Disqualification (professional wrestling)
  - Disqualification (tennis)
- Judicial disqualification, also known as recusal
- Company Directors Disqualification Act 1986, a UK company law
- Disqualification (driving), or "driving ban", given in many jurisdictions for driving under the influence and other offences
