= 2017 Verrazzano Open – Singles =

Singles
- 2017 Verrazzano Open

Final
- Champion: (United Kingdom) Aljaž Bedene
- Runner-up: (France) Benoît Paire
- Score: 6–2, 6–2

Events
Singles	Doubles
Verrazzano Open	· 2019 →

This was the first edition of the tournament.

Aljaž Bedene won the title after defeating Benoît Paire 6–2, 6–2 in the final.

== Seeds ==
1. (France) Benoît Paire (final)
2. (Spain) Nicolás Almagro (first round)
3. (Spain) Guillermo García López (quarterfinals)
4. (United Kingdom) Aljaž Bedene (champion)
5. (France) Paul-Henri Mathieu (second round)
6. (Romania) Marius Copil (first round)
7. (Slovakia) Norbert Gombos (second round)
8. (Belgium) Arthur De Greef (quarterfinals)

== Draw ==
=== Key ===
- Q = Qualifier
- WC = Wild card
- LL = Lucky loser
- Alt = Alternate
- SE = Special exempt
- PR = Protected ranking
- ITF = ITF entry
- JE = Junior exempt
- w/o = Walkover
- r = Retired
- d = Defaulted
- SR = Special ranking

=== Finals ===
Semifinals
1/WC	(France) Benoît Paire	6	7^{8}
(Slovakia) Jozef Kovalík	4	6^{6}
4	(United Kingdom) Aljaž Bedene	6	6
(Italy) Marco Cecchinato	2	2

Final
1/WC	(France) Benoît Paire	2	2
4	(United Kingdom) Aljaž Bedene	6	6

=== Top half ===
First round
1/WC	(France) B Paire	6	6
(Argentina) M Trungelliti	1	4
WC	(Greece) S Tsitsipas	2	4
Q	(Belgium) K Coppejans	6	6
(France) K de Schepper	1	2
(Hungary) M Fucsovics	6	6
(Serbia) L Đere	4	3
5	(France) P-H Mathieu	6	6
3	(Spain) G García López	6	7
SE	(France) C Moutet	2	5
WC	(Czech Republic) L Rosol	6^{1}	6	6
LL	(France) M Janvier	7^{7}	3	4
(South Korea) D-h Lee	5	7	4
(France) C Lestienne	7	5	2^{r}
(Slovakia) J Kovalík	4	6	6
6	(Romania) M Copil	6	2	2

Second round
1/WC	(France) B Paire	6	6^{10}	6
Q	(Belgium) K Coppejans	1	7^{12}	4
(Hungary) M Fucsovics	6	1	6
5	(France) P-H Mathieu	4	6	3
3	(Spain) G García López	6	5	6
WC	(Czech Republic) L Rosol	0	7	3
(South Korea) D-h Lee	7	4	4
(Slovakia) J Kovalík	5	6	6

Quarterfinals
1/WC	(France) B Paire	7	6
(Hungary) M Fucsovics	5	3
3	(Spain) G García López	6^{5}	7	1
(Slovakia) J Kovalík	7^{7}	5	6

Semifinals
1/WC	(France) B Paire	6	7^{8}
(Slovakia) J Kovalík	4	6^{6}

=== Bottom half ===
First round
7	(Slovakia) N Gombos	4	6	6
Q	(Croatia) F Škugor	6	4	1
Q	(France) M Bourgue	4	6	6
(Spain) R Carballés Baena	6	1	4
(Italy) F Gaio	3	4
Q	(Serbia) F Krajinović	6	6
(Spain) E López-Pérez	3	4
4	(United Kingdom) A Bedene	6	6
8	(Belgium) A De Greef	6	6
(France) V Millot	2	4
(Spain) A Montañés	2	1
(Italy) S Napolitano	6	6
(Belarus) U Ignatik	6	6
WC	(Israel) Y Oliel	4	4
(Italy) M Cecchinato	6	2	6
2	(Spain) N Almagro	2	6	3

Second round
7	(Slovakia) N Gombos	3	4
Q	(France) M Bourgue	6	6
Q	(Serbia) F Krajinović	4	6^{3}
4	(United Kingdom) A Bedene	6	7^{7}
8	(Belgium) A De Greef	6	5	7^{7}
(Italy) S Napolitano	4	7	6^{4}
(Belarus) U Ignatik	3	4
(Italy) M Cecchinato	6	6

Quarterfinals
Q	(France) M Bourgue	4	6^{5}
4	(United Kingdom) A Bedene	6	7^{7}
8	(Belgium) A De Greef	3	3
(Italy) M Cecchinato	6	6

Semifinals
4	(United Kingdom) A Bedene	6	6
(Italy) M Cecchinato	2	2
