= Disqualification (tennis) =

Rule in tennis

Disqualifications in tennis can occur for unsporting conduct.

ATP rules state that:

Players shall not at any time physically abuse any official, opponent, spectator or other person within the precincts of the tournament site. For purposes of this rule, physical abuse is the unauthorized touching of an official, opponent, and spectator or other person.

== Disqualified players ==
This is a list of code violations that resulted in a player or doubles team being disqualified from the tournament.

=== ATP Tour ===
Tournament	Player(s)	Opponent(s)	Reason
1976 Indian Wells, USA	Ilie Năstase	Roscoe Tanner	Defaulted for leaving the court.
1988 Cincinnati Open, USA	Andrés Gómez	Carl Limberger	Two audible obscenities, hitting the court microphone and smashing his racket against the court.
1990 Australian Open, Australia	John McEnroe	Mikael Pernfors	Three consecutive code violations. Received a warning for unsportsmanlike conduct after intimidating a lineswoman, a second warning for racquet abuse, and was disqualified after verbally abusing the chair umpire Gerry Armstrong. McEnroe was fined US$6,500.
1995 French Open, France	Carsten Arriens	Brett Steven	Hitting a linesman with a thrown racket.
1995 Wimbledon, UK	Tim Henman / Jeremy Bates	Jeff Tarango / Henrik Holm	Both were disqualified after Henman hit a ball girl with a ball.
1995 Wimbledon, UK	Jeff Tarango	Alexander Mronz	Telling spectators to "shut up" earned a violation, and a second one after he called the chair umpire the "most corrupt official in the game" before walking off the court. Tarango was fined £28,000 and banned from the tournament the following year
1995 US Open, USA	Shuzo Matsuoka	Petr Korda	Delay of play after collapsing from severe cramping in his thighs. He was not allowed to receive medical attention without forfeiting the match under the rules at the time. The incident led to a change in the rules of professional tennis to allow players to receive medical treatment during matches.
1996 Indianapolis Open, USA	Andre Agassi	Daniel Nestor	Ball abuse and verbal abuse.
1997 Miami Open, USA	Mariano Zabaleta	Adrian Voinea	Disqualified over hitting a line judge with a ball.
2000 French Open, France	Stefan Koubek	Attila Sávolt	Hitting a ball boy.
2000 Los Angeles Open, USA	Marcelo Ríos	Gouichi Motomura	Swearing at the chair umpire. Subsequently, fined US$5,000.
2005 Miami Open, USA	Xavier Malisse	David Ferrer	Aggravated behaviour (Hitting a line judge and insulting her).
2007 Open de Moselle, France	Stefan Koubek (2)	Sébastien Grosjean	Directing abusive language towards the tournament supervisor while disputing a call.
2012 Queen's Club Championships, UK	David Nalbandian	Marin Čilić	Injuring an official after kicking an advertising board.
2016 Savannah Challenger, USA	Daniil Medvedev	Donald Young	Disqualified over 'question[ing] the impartiality of the umpire based on her race,' the US Tennis Association said.
2017 Davis Cup World Group, Canada	Denis Shapovalov	Kyle Edmund	Hitting the chair umpire with a ball hit in anger.
2017 US Open, USA	Fabio Fognini	Stefano Travaglia	Fine: $24,000/$96,000; verbal abuse to Chair Umpire. Defaulted from doubles match.
2018 Swiss Open, Switzerland	Yann Marti	Adrian Bodmer	Pointing racquet at Severin Lüthi and saying to him: "You can put that in your butt."
2019 Italian Open, Italy	Nick Kyrgios	Casper Ruud	Multiple offenses throughout the match, including ball abuse, offensive language directed at spectators, racket slamming, and tossing a chair onto the court; because of the default, Kyrgios was fined €33,635 plus the cost of his hotel accommodation and lost all ATP points earned for the tournament.
2020 US Open, USA	Novak Djokovic	Pablo Carreño Busta	Hitting a lineswoman with a ball hit in anger.
2021 Mexican Open, Mexico	Damir Džumhur	Botic van de Zandschulp	Leaving the court after continued disputes with the umpire earned him a point penalty.
2021 Barcelona Open, Spain	Fabio Fognini (2)	Bernabé Zapata Miralles	Alleged "Verbal obscenity" against a line judge.
2022 Adelaide International, Australia	Corentin Moutet	Laslo Djere	Verbal obscenity against the chair umpire.
2022 Mexican Open, Mexico	Alexander Zverev	Lloyd Glasspool / Harri Heliövaara	Fined $40,000 ($20,000 for verbal abuse and $20,000 for unsportsmanlike conduct after smashing the racket into the umpire's chair). Defaulted from singles match.
2023 Lyon Open, France	Mikael Ymer	Arthur Fils	Hitting the umpire's chair with racket twice in anger; fined a total of €37,370 ($40,000) for his behavior.
2023 Shanghai Masters, China	Marc Polmans	Stefano Napolitano	Hitting the ball to umpire in anger when missed first match point.
2024 Dubai Tennis Championships, UAE	Andrey Rublev	Alexander Bublik	Verbal abuse, screaming in the face of a line judge.
2024 Mubadala Citi DC Open, USA	Denis Shapovalov (2)	Ben Shelton	Offensive language directed at a spectator.
2026 China Open, China	Daniil Medvedev (2)	Novak Djokovic	Hitting spectator with ball.

=== WTA Tour ===
Tournament	Player	Opponent	Reason
1996 Palermo Ladies Open, Italy	Irina Spîrlea	Stephanie Devillé	Abusive language directed at an official.
2007 Cincinnati Masters, USA	Anastasia Rodionova	Angelique Kerber	Hitting a ball at spectators cheering Kerber
2023 French Open, France	Miyu Kato / Aldila Sutjiadi	Sara Sorribes Tormo / Marie Bouzková	The pair were defaulted after a shot from Kato accidentally hit a ball girl.

== See also ==
- Unsportsmanlike conduct
- List of tennis code violations
