= 2019 Verrazzano Open – Doubles =

Doubles
- 2019 Verrazzano Open

Final
- Champions: (Netherlands) Thiemo de Bakker (Netherlands) Robin Haase
- Runners-up: (France) Enzo Couacaud (France) Tristan Lamasine
- Score: 6–4, 6–4

Events
| Singles | Doubles |
| ← 2017 · | Verrazzano Open | · 2020 → |

Tristan Lamasine and Franko Škugor were the defending champions but only Lamasine chose to defend his title, partnering Enzo Couacaud. Lamasine lost in the final to Thiemo de Bakker and Robin Haase.

De Bakker and Haase won the title after defeating Couacaud and Lamasine 6–4, 6–4 in the final.

== Seeds ==
1. (New Zealand) Marcus Daniell / (Netherlands) Matwé Middelkoop (first round)
2. (Ukraine) Denys Molchanov / (Slovakia) Igor Zelenay (first round)
3. (Monaco) Romain Arneodo / (France) Hugo Nys (semifinals)
4. (India) Leander Paes / (France) Benoît Paire (semifinals)

== Draw ==
=== Key ===
- Q = Qualifier
- WC = Wild card
- LL = Lucky loser
- Alt = Alternate
- SE = Special exempt
- PR = Protected ranking
- ITF = ITF entry
- JE = Junior exempt
- w/o = Walkover
- r = Retired
- d = Defaulted
- SR = Special ranking

First round
1 | (New Zealand) M Daniell (Netherlands) M Middelkoop | 6^{7} | 4
(France) J Eysseric (Croatia) A Šančić | 7^{9} | 6
ITF | (Germany) Peter Heller (Egypt) K-M Maamoun | 2 | 5
(Netherlands) T de Bakker (Netherlands) R Haase | 6 | 7
3 | (Monaco) R Arneodo (France) H Nys | 6 | 6^{7} | [10]
(Switzerland) L Margaroli (Venezuela) LD Martínez | 4 | 7^{9} | [6]
(Serbia) N Čačić (Serbia) F Krajinović | 3 | 2
(Uruguay) A Behar (Italy) M Donati | 6 | 6
WC | (France) E Benchetrit (Chinese Taipei) C-h Tseng | 4 | 2
WC | (Germany) R Molleker (Australia) A Popyrin | 6 | 6
(Belarus) A Vasilevski (Italy) A Vavassori | 5 | 0
4 | (India) L Paes (France) B Paire | 7 | 6
ITF | (Spain) S Martos Gornés (Spain) O Roca Batalla | 7^{7} | 7^{9}
(Germany) D Brown (Australia) R Junaid | 6^{2} | 6^{7}
WC | (France) E Couacaud (France) T Lamasine | 6 | 7^{8}
2 | (Ukraine) D Molchanov (Slovakia) I Zelenay | 4 | 6^{6}

Quarterfinals
(France) J Eysseric (Croatia) A Šančić | 6^{4} | 1
(Netherlands) T de Bakker (Netherlands) R Haase | 7^{7} | 6
3 | (Monaco) R Arneodo (France) H Nys | w/o
(Uruguay) A Behar (Italy) M Donati
WC | (Germany) R Molleker (Australia) A Popyrin | 0^{r}
4 | (India) L Paes (France) B Paire | 4
ITF | (Spain) S Martos Gornés (Spain) O Roca Batalla | 6^{6} | 4
WC | (France) E Couacaud (France) T Lamasine | 7^{8} | 6

Semifinals
(Netherlands) T de Bakker (Netherlands) R Haase | 6 | 6
3 | (Monaco) R Arneodo (France) H Nys | 4 | 4
4 | (India) L Paes (France) B Paire | 7^{7} | 6^{2} | [5]
WC | (France) E Couacaud (France) T Lamasine | 6^{4} | 7^{7} | [10]

Final
(Netherlands) T de Bakker (Netherlands) R Haase | 6 | 6
WC | (France) E Couacaud (France) T Lamasine | 4 | 4
