= 2019 Verrazzano Open =

- Date: 1–7 April
- Edition: 2nd
- Surface: Clay
- Location: Sophia Antipolis, France
- Venue: Mouratoglou Tennis Academy

Champions

Singles
- (Germany) Dustin Brown

Doubles
- (Netherlands) Thiemo de Bakker / (Netherlands) Robin Haase
← 2017 ·	Verrazzano Open	· 2020 →

The 2019 Verrazzano Open was a professional tennis tournament played on clay courts. It was the second edition of the tournament which was part of the 2019 ATP Challenger Tour. It took place in Sophia Antipolis, France between 1 and 7 April 2019.

== Singles main-draw entrants ==
=== Seeds ===
Country	Player	Rank^{1}	Seed
FRA	Pierre-Hugues Herbert	49	1
NED	Robin Haase	65	2
FRA	Benoît Paire	67	3
ESP	Albert Ramos Viñolas	86	4
SRB	Filip Krajinović	103	5
ITA	Lorenzo Sonego	106	6
ARG	Marco Trungelliti	114	7
AUS	Alexei Popyrin	119	8
SVK	Jozef Kovalík	121	9
ITA	Simone Bolelli	147	10
GER	Yannick Hanfmann	160	11
ITA	Filippo Baldi	162	12
ITA	Alessandro Giannessi	166	13
GER	Rudolf Molleker	180	14
BEL	Kimmer Coppejans	183	15
ITA	Gianluca Mager	188	16

- ^{1} Rankings are as of March 18, 2019.

=== Other entrants ===
The following players received wildcards into the singles main draw:

- (France) Antoine Cornut-Chauvinc
- (France) Pierre-Hugues Herbert
- (Italy) Lorenzo Musetti
- (France) Arthur Rinderknech
- (Chinese Taipei) Tseng Chun-hsin

The following players received entry into the singles main draw using their ITF World Tennis Ranking:

- (France) Baptiste Crepatte
- (Germany) Peter Heller
- (Egypt) Karim-Mohamed Maamoun
- (Spain) Oriol Roca Batalla

The following players received entry from the qualifying draw:

- (Portugal) Frederico Ferreira Silva
- (Hungary) Máté Valkusz

The following player received entry as a lucky loser:

- (Russia) Alexander Zhurbin

== Champions ==
=== Singles ===
- (Germany) Dustin Brown def. (Serbia) Filip Krajinović 6–3, 7–5.

=== Doubles ===
- (Netherlands) Thiemo de Bakker / (Netherlands) Robin Haase def. (France) Enzo Couacaud / (France) Tristan Lamasine 6–4, 6–4.
