= 2019 Verrazzano Open – Singles =

Singles
- 2019 Verrazzano Open

Final
- Champion: (Germany) Dustin Brown
- Runner-up: (Serbia) Filip Krajinović
- Score: 6–3, 7–5

Events
Singles	Doubles
← 2017 ·	Verrazzano Open	· 2020 →

Aljaž Bedene was the defending champion but chose not to defend his title.

Dustin Brown won the title after defeating Filip Krajinović 6–3, 7–5 in the final.

== Seeds ==
All seeds receive a bye into the second round.

1. (France) Pierre-Hugues Herbert (third round)
2. (Netherlands) Robin Haase (second round)
3. (France) Benoît Paire (second round)
4. (Spain) Albert Ramos Viñolas (second round)
5. (Serbia) Filip Krajinović (final)
6. (Italy) Lorenzo Sonego (third round)
7. (Argentina) Marco Trungelliti (second round, retired)
8. (Australia) Alexei Popyrin (third round)
9. (Slovakia) Jozef Kovalík (second round)
10. (Italy) Simone Bolelli (quarterfinals)
11. (Germany) Yannick Hanfmann (third round, withdrew)
12. (Italy) Filippo Baldi (quarterfinals)
13. (Italy) Alessandro Giannessi (third round)
14. (Germany) Rudolf Molleker (semifinals)
15. (Belgium) Kimmer Coppejans (third round)
16. (Italy) Gianluca Mager (quarterfinals)

== Draw ==
=== Key ===
- Q = Qualifier
- WC = Wild card
- LL = Lucky loser
- Alt = Alternate
- SE = Special exempt
- PR = Protected ranking
- ITF = ITF entry
- JE = Junior exempt
- w/o = Walkover
- r = Retired
- d = Defaulted
- SR = Special ranking

=== Finals ===
Quarterfinals
16	(Italy) Gianluca Mager	6^{2}	4
5	(Serbia) Filip Krajinović	7^{7}	6
(Italy) Roberto Marcora	6	6
12	(Italy) Filippo Baldi	3	3
10	(Italy) Simone Bolelli	3	6	3
14	(Germany) Rudolf Molleker	6	3	6
(Italy) Matteo Donati	5	2
(Germany) Dustin Brown	7	6

Semifinals
5	(Serbia) Filip Krajinović	6	6
(Italy) Roberto Marcora	2	2
14	(Germany) Rudolf Molleker	7^{7}	4	2
(Germany) Dustin Brown	6^{1}	6	6

Final
5	(Serbia) Filip Krajinović	3	5
(Germany) Dustin Brown	6	7

=== Top half ===
==== Section 1 ====
First round
(Croatia) N Serdarušić	4	4
(Egypt) M Safwat	6	6
(Netherlands) T de Bakker	4	6^{5}
(France) C Hemery	6	7^{7}
Q	(Hungary) M Valkusz	1	0^{r}
(France) E Benchetrit	6	1
(Bosnia and Herzegovina) T Brkić	1	3
Q	(Portugal) F Ferreira Silva	6	6

Second round
1/WC	(France) P-H Herbert	7^{7}	6
(Egypt) M Safwat	6^{3}	2
(France) C Hemery	6^{8}	1^{r}
16	(Italy) G Mager	7^{10}	4
11	(Germany) Y Hanfmann	6	7
(France) E Benchetrit	2	5
Q	(Portugal) F Ferreira Silva	7	4	2
5	(Serbia) F Krajinović	5	6	6

Third round
1/WC	(France) P-H Herbert	6^{4}	5
16	(Italy) G Mager	7^{7}	7
11	(Germany) Y Hanfmann
5	(Serbia) F Krajinović	w/o

Quarterfinals
16	(Italy) G Mager	6^{2}	4
5	(Serbia) F Krajinović	7^{7}	6

==== Section 2 ====
First round
(France) T Lamasine	2	1
(Italy) R Marcora	6	6
WC	(France) Antoine Cornut-Chauvinc	3	4
ITF	(Spain) O Roca Batalla	6	6
(Serbia) V Troicki	4	2
WC	(France) A Rinderknech	6	6
WC	(Italy) L Musetti	3	6	6
ITF	(Egypt) K-M Maamoun	6	1	2

Second round
3	(France) B Paire	3	2
(Italy) R Marcora	6	6
ITF	(Spain) O Roca Batalla	5	2
13	(Italy) A Giannessi	7	6
12	(Italy) F Baldi	6	0
WC	(France) A Rinderknech	2	0^{r}
WC	(Italy) L Musetti	3	2
8	(Australia) A Popyrin	6	6

Third round
(Italy) R Marcora	6	6
13	(Italy) A Giannessi	2	3
12	(Italy) F Baldi	6	6
8	(Australia) A Popyrin	3	4

Quarterfinals
(Italy) R Marcora	6	6
12	(Italy) F Baldi	3	3

=== Bottom half ===
==== Section 3 ====
First round
WC	(Chinese Taipei) C-h Tseng	6	4	3
(Spain) B Zapata Miralles	3	6	6
(Belarus) U Ignatik	6	3	6^{3}
ITF	(Germany) Peter Heller	2	6	7^{7}
(Austria) L Miedler	6^{8}	6	7
(Czech Republic) Z Kolář	7^{10}	4	5
(United States) T-S Kwiatkowski	6	4	6
(Netherlands) S Griekspoor	4	6	4

Second round
6	(Italy) L Sonego	6	7^{7}
(Spain) B Zapata Miralles	3	6^{4}
ITF	(Germany) P Heller	2	5
10	(Italy) S Bolelli	6	7
14	(Germany) R Molleker	6	7^{7}
(Austria) L Miedler	3	6^{3}
(United States) T-S Kwiatkowski	2	6	6
4	(Spain) A Ramos Viñolas	6	3	4

Third round
6	(Italy) L Sonego	6^{8}	6^{3}
10	(Italy) S Bolelli	7^{10}	7^{7}
14	(Germany) R Molleker	6^{5}	6	6
(United States) T-S Kwiatkowski	7^{7}	3	3

Quarterfinals
10	(Italy) S Bolelli	3	6	3
14	(Germany) R Molleker	6	3	6

==== Section 4 ====
First round
(Italy) M Donati	6	6
(France) K de Schepper	2	0
(France) E Couacaud	6	6
LL	(Russia) A Zhurbin	2	0
(Italy) M Viola	2	3
(France) J Tatlot	6	6
ITF	(France) Baptiste Crepatte	4	2
(Germany) D Brown	6	6

Second round
7	(Argentina) M Trungelliti	2	1^{r}
(Italy) M Donati	6	1
(France) E Couacaud	7^{7}	6
9	(Slovakia) J Kovalík	6^{2}	4
15	(Belgium) K Coppejans	1	6	3
(France) J Tatlot	6	4	0^{r}
(Germany) D Brown	6	6
2	(Netherlands) R Haase	4	3

Third round
(Italy) M Donati	6^{5}	7^{7}	6
(France) E Couacaud	7^{7}	6^{5}	2
15	(Belgium) K Coppejans	7^{7}	5	2
(Germany) D Brown	6^{2}	7	6

Quarterfinals
(Italy) M Donati	5	2
(Germany) D Brown	7	6
