= 2018 US Open – Women's singles final =

Tennis match

2018 US Open Women's Final
- (Japan) Naomi Osaka vs. (United States) Serena Williams
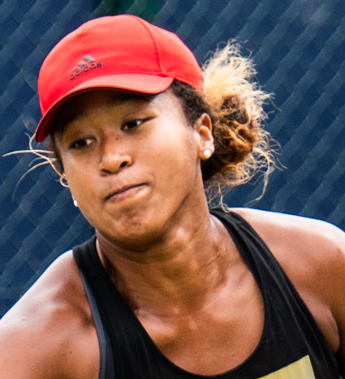
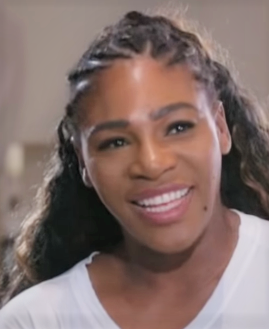
- Naomi Osaka (left) and Serena Williams (right)
Set	1	2
(Japan) Naomi Osaka	6	6
(United States) Serena Williams	2	4
- Date: September 8, 2018
- Tournament: US Open
- Location: New York City
- Chair umpire: Carlos Ramos
- Duration: 1 hour 19 minutes
- World rankings: (Japan) Naomi Osaka: 19 (United States) Serena Williams: 26

Previous head-to-head results
- Osaka 1–0 S. Williams

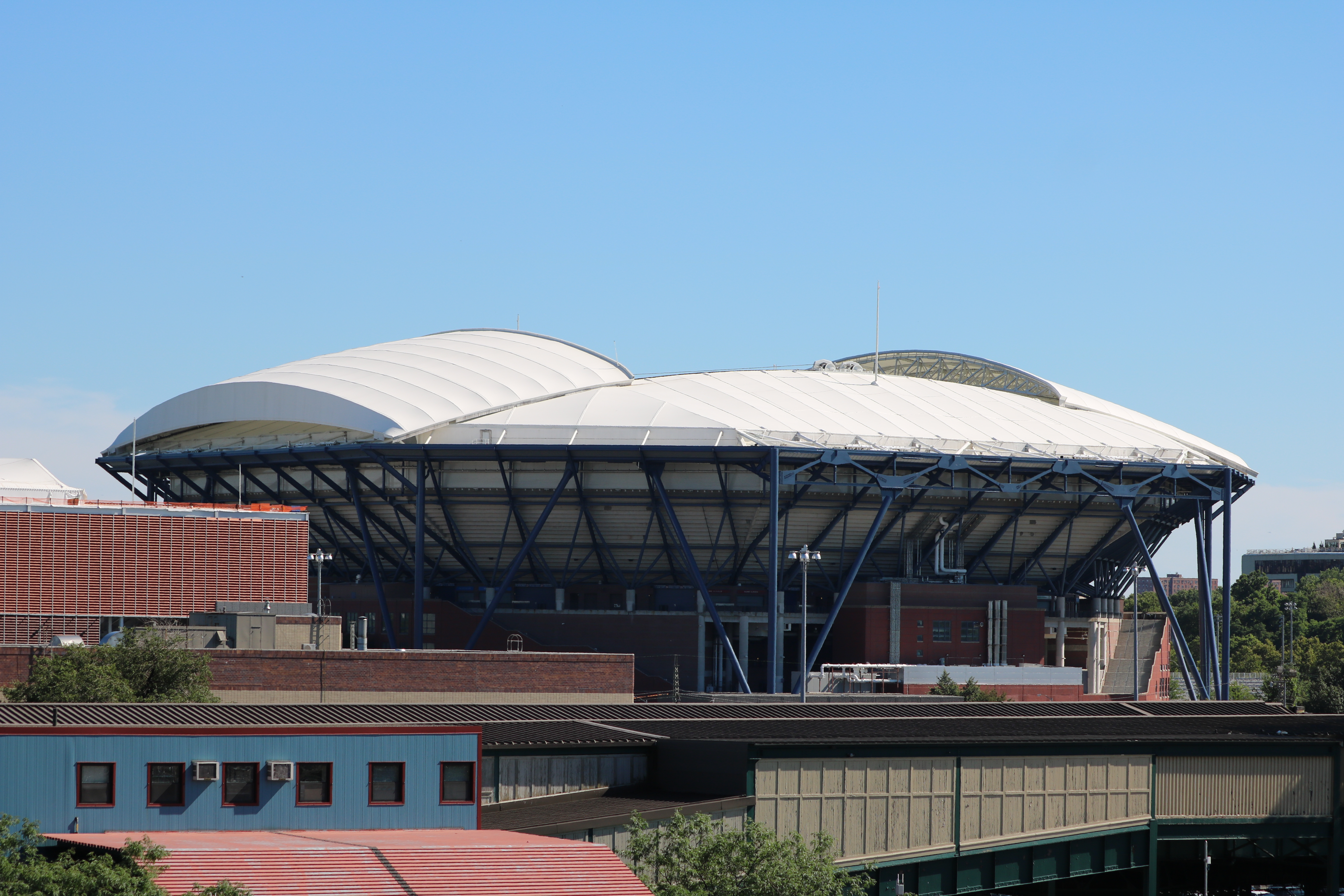
An exterior view of Arthur Ashe Stadium, where the match took place.

The 2018 US Open Women's Singles final was the championship tennis match of the Women's Singles tournament at the 2018 US Open. It was contested between Serena Williams and Naomi Osaka, seeded 17th and 20th respectively. Osaka defeated Williams in straight sets, 6–2, 6–4, in one hour and 19 minutes.

The match was significant for both players. It was Williams's first US Open after a 12-month hiatus to give birth to her first child in September 2017, and second attempt since her pregnancy (after that year's Wimbledon) to equal Margaret Court's all-time record of 24 major titles. Osaka was the first Japanese player to contest a major women's singles final, and was attempting to become the first Japanese player, male or female, to win a major singles title.

The match generated significant controversy due to a series of altercations between Williams and chair umpire Carlos Ramos during the second set. Williams's on-court behavior and Ramos's disciplinary actions, and Williams's responses, particularly her invocation of perceived sexism during her arguments with Ramos and officials, and following the match, polarized the tennis community and media worldwide. The International Tennis Federation issued a statement supporting Carlos Ramos's umpiring during the match, stating that his "decisions were in accordance with the relevant rules and were re-affirmed by the US Open’s decision to fine Serena Williams for the three offences".

== Background ==
The pair met only once previously, with Osaka winning in straight sets in the first round of the 2018 Miami Open.

=== Williams ===
At the start of the tournament, Williams had won 23 Grand Slam championships, the most in the Open Era, and second-most of all time, and was attempting to equal Margaret Court's all-time record of 24 Grand Slam championships, which required her to best her own record of being the oldest female Grand Slam women's singles champion at the time set at the 2017 Australian Open.

2018 marked a highly anticipated comeback for Williams since giving birth in September 2017. Her prior successes, and consequent status as one of the greatest tennis players of all time, attracted significant media interest in her pregnancy and motherhood, where she openly revealed almost suffering near-fatal childbirth-related complications as a result of an emergency Caesarian section, requiring five surgeries and leaving her bedridden for six weeks. She used her struggle to cast light on the issue, consequently being hailed as an inspiration for mothers overall, further adding to public anticipation towards her return to tour.

Williams's return was, however, difficult. Originally intending to return for the 2018 Australian Open, complications from her pregnancy caused her to miss the tournament, leaving her unable to defend her title from the previous year, and delay her return until the Indian Wells Masters that February, where she lost to older sister Venus in the third round. In the Miami Open two weeks later, Williams would face Osaka for the first time, and only time until their US Open match, in the first round, where Osaka upset Williams in straight sets - Williams's earliest ever exit from the Miami Open in her career. Williams's first Grand Slam campaign since her return at the French Open ended disappointingly, as she withdrew before her fourth round match against Maria Sharapova. However, her Wimbledon campaign the following month was more successful, reaching the final. Despite losing to Angelique Kerber in straight sets, her feat of reaching the final in the first place was seen as both a return to form—Sonia Oxley of BBC Sport quipping that "she still has the stamina, spirit and shots to carry on collecting Grand Slam titles", and 2016 men's singles champion Andy Murray noting that "It is tough to bet against her now she's got this far"—and a reinforcement of her status as an icon of motherhood and women's empowerment.

=== Osaka ===
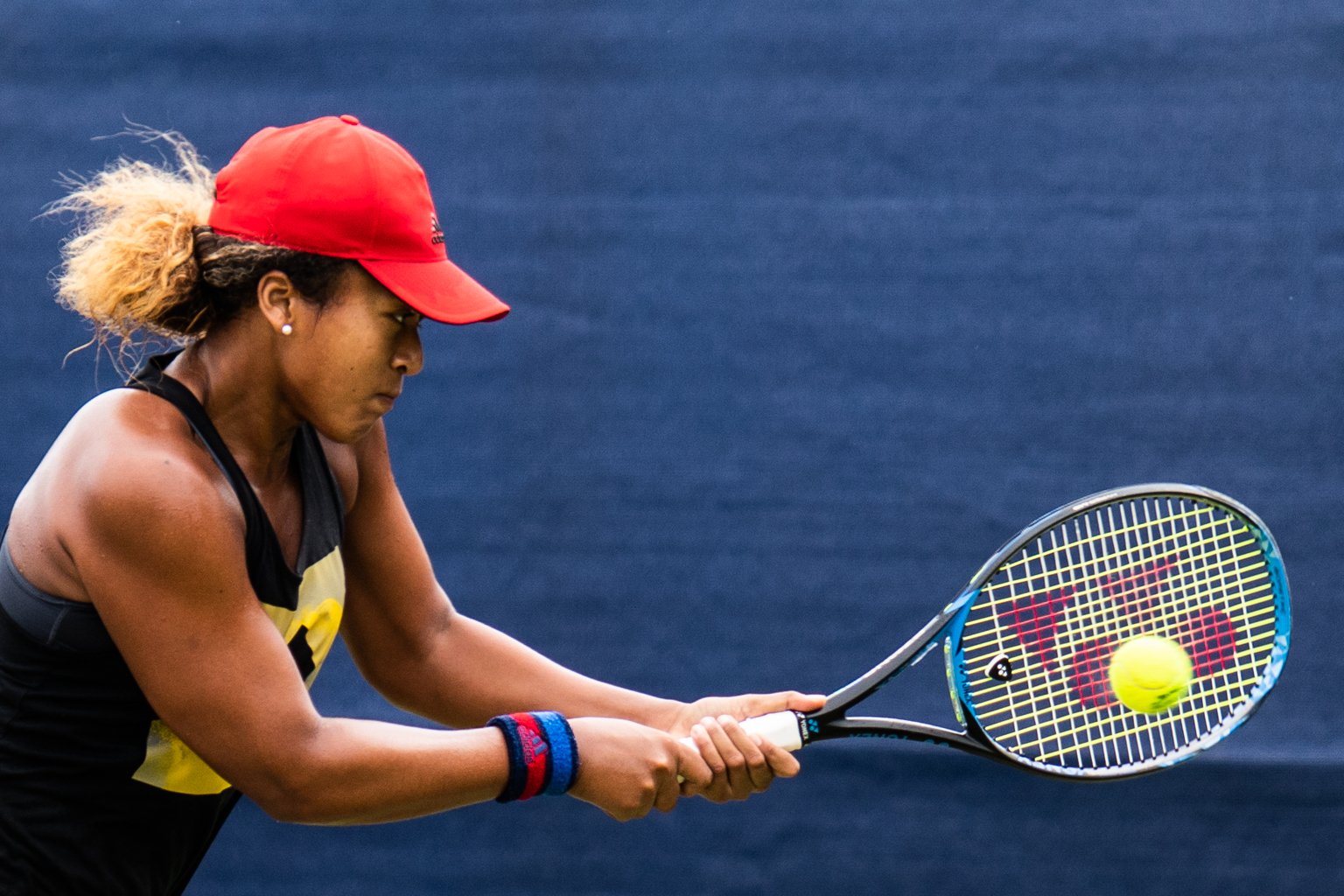
Osaka at the 2018 French Open, where she was seeded at a Major for the first time in her career.

Osaka was relatively unknown, beginning the year ranked No. 68, having only entered the top 50 briefly in 2016, and having neither been seeded in the main draw of a Grand Slam tournament nor advanced beyond the third round. She had, however, made a break at the 2017 US Open, upsetting defending champion Angelique Kerber in the first round, 6–3, 6–1. She improved upon her Grand Slam record at the 2018 Australian Open, advancing to the fourth round where she lost to world No. 1 and eventual runner-up Simona Halep in straight sets, 6–3, 6–2.

Following her 2018 Australian Open campaign, Osaka earned the biggest win of her career at Indian Wells, during which she defeated former World No. 1s Maria Sharapova and Karolína Plíšková, and avenged her Australian Open loss to Halep in the semifinal, before defeating Daria Kasatkina in the final to claim her biggest championship yet. Subsequently, she entered the 2018 French Open seeded 21st, the first Grand Slam tournament in which she was seeded in the main draw. By mid-August 2018, Osaka attained the highest ranking yet of her career at World No. 17, and was the youngest player in the WTA's top 20.

Osaka entered the main draw of the US Open seeded 20th; however, early round losses on her side of the draw, including those of Australian Open champion Caroline Wozniacki and former Wimbledon champion Petra Kvitová, meant that Osaka did not face any player seeded above her until her semifinal with Madison Keys. Osaka qualified for the final having only dropped one set during the entire tournament (in the fourth round against Aryna Sabalenka), and by beating Keys in the semifinal 6–2, 6–4, a match during which she saved all 13 break points she faced. Osaka was the first player from Japan to contest a Grand Slam women's singles final (the second Japanese able-bodied player overall after Kei Nishikori at the 2014 US Open, and fourth player overall after Nishikori, Yui Kamiji and Shingo Kunieda), and was attempting to become the first able-bodied Japanese player, male or female, to win a Grand Slam singles title.

Osaka's personal admiration for Williams as a primary inspiration for her tennis career was a focal point of the media's interest in her rise. Upon defeating Maria Sharapova in her successful 2018 Indian Wells campaign, Osaka quipped, "There are three people I wanted to play, Venus, [Sharapova] and Serena. Now I'm just waiting to play Serena." Williams has been described as Osaka's "hero" and "idol", and the US Open final matchup as Osaka's childhood dream; Osaka's focus has been described as "solely on becoming the next Serena", Osaka herself remarking that, during challenging scenarios on court, she thinks "What would Serena do?" Interviewed following her semi-final victory over Keys, Osaka commented on her thoughts during the match, "I was just thinking that I really wanted to play Serena, because she is Serena", and when asked what her message to Serena would be, simply said, "I love you."

== Match ==
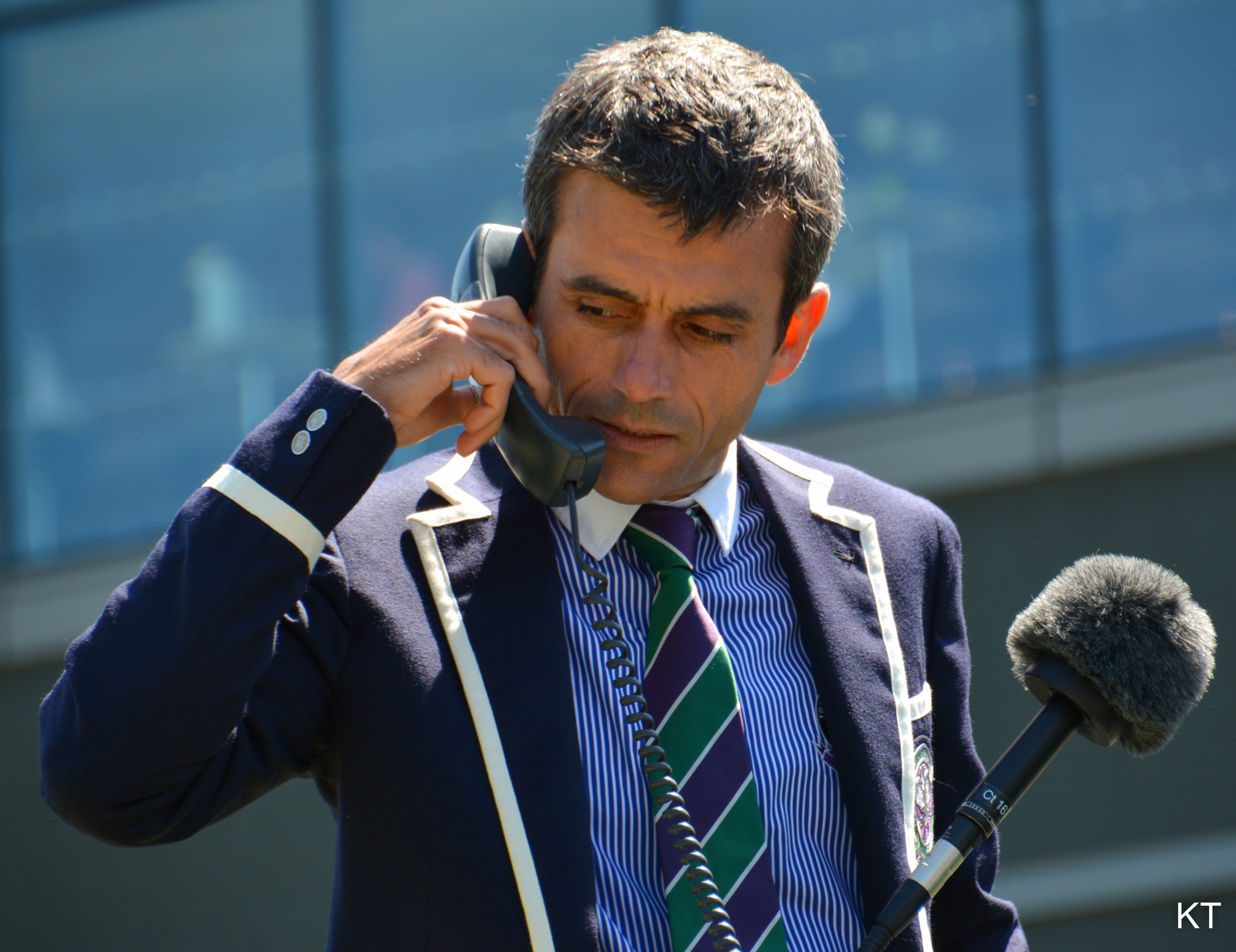
Carlos Ramos, pictured during the 2015 Wimbledon Championships, oversaw the fifth Grand Slam final of his umpiring career.

The match began at 4:20 p.m. Eastern Time. Carlos Ramos of Portugal was the chair umpire for the match.

=== Sets ===
The first set passed by without any major incident, with Osaka breaking twice en route to winning it 6–2.

With Williams leading the second set, 1–0, 15-40, chair umpire Ramos gave Williams an official warning for coaching, a code violation under International Tennis Federation rules. Television replays showed her coach, Patrick Mouratoglou, gesturing to Serena with his hands and nodding, apparently signalling her to move forward toward the net. Mouratoglou admitted after the match that he did signal some form of coaching from the players' box, but of which he believed Williams was unaware. In response, Williams approached Ramos and told him, "If he's giving me a thumbs up, he's telling me to come on. We don't have any code, and I know you don't know that, and I understand why you thought that was coaching but I'm telling you it's not. I don't cheat to win. I'd rather lose. I'm just letting you know." Osaka won the next point to level the second set, 1–1. During the following court change, leading 2-1, Williams brought up the matter again with Ramos, saying "it's not something I would do but I could understand why you may have thought that but just know I've never cheated." Ramos assured Williams that he understood her, the on-court microphone picking him up telling Williams "I understood your reaction as well", which Williams thanked him for; however, the ruling was upheld and the penalty was not retracted.

After breaking Osaka's serve for the first time in the match, Williams was serving at 3–1, at 30-15, however double faulted two points in a row to bring up break point, 30-40. Osaka broke back Williams's serve on the next point to bring the set back on serve, 3–2, as Williams hit the ball into the net on a backhand unforced error, turned to her box in frustration saying (according to on-court commentator Luke Jensen) "I can't get over the top of the ball", and smashed her racket on the court. Ramos issued her a second code violation, this time for racket abuse. As her second violation, she was penalized a point, and thus the next game started 15-0 to Osaka's advantage. Upon hearing of this, Williams raised the issue of her first code violation again with Ramos, insisting "this is unbelievable. Every time I play here I have problems." Williams said to Ramos that "make an announcement that I didn't get coaching ... you owe me an apology, I have never cheated in my life!" Invoking her recent pregnancy, she further remonstrated that "I have a daughter and I stand for what is right for her" and that "you will never do another one of my matches." Despite the disruption, Osaka kept her concentration and held serve the following game to level the set at 3–3, before breaking Williams's serve a second time in the set with a forehand winner to lead 4–3.

At the following change of ends, Williams continued to berate Ramos, accusing him of attacking her character by insinuating that she cheated via being coached. She continued to demand an apology from Ramos, commanding, "you owe me an apology. Say it! Say you're sorry!" and asserting to him that "you will never, ever, ever, be on another court of mine as long as you live." The exchange culminated in Williams calling the umpire a "liar" and a "thief". Ramos judged this to be a further code violation for verbal abuse; as the third code violation of the match against Williams, Osaka was awarded the next game by default, bringing the score to 5–3 and Osaka one game away from victory. Williams then demanded to speak to tournament referee Brian Earley and WTA supervisor Donna Kelso, to whom Williams indignantly claimed that such incidents have "happened to me too many times", she was being unfairly penalized because she was a woman, and that male players "do a lot worse" without penalty, and that "it happened to me at this tournament every single year" (Williams had previously been subject to code violations three times in over twenty tournaments here, all of which were upheld). Following this exchange, Williams held her serve to love (at 5–4), and continued to remonstrate with Kelso after the game. Osaka, however, held serve in the following game to win the set 6–4 and the match.

== Statistics ==
Category	(United States) S. Williams	(Japan) Osaka
1st serve %	30/55 (55%)	40/55 (73%)
1st serve points won	19 of 30 = 63%	29 of 40 = 73%
2nd serve points won	11 of 25 = 44%	6 of 15 = 40%
Total service points won	30 of 55 = 54.54%	35 of 55 = 63.64%
Aces	3	6
Double faults	6	1
Winners	21	16
Unforced errors	21	14
Net points won	6 of 8 = 75%	0 of 1 = 0%
Break points converted	1 of 6 = 17%	4 of 5 = 80%
Return points won	20 of 55 = 36%	25 of 55 = 46%
Total points won	50	60

== Aftermath ==
Upon defeat, Williams embraced Osaka, but refused to shake Ramos's hand as per game etiquette, instead pointing at him and reasserting, "You owe me an apology." As Ramos left the court, the US crowd booed; Osaka, after greeting her team, did not acknowledge the crowd but immediately returned to her bench and hid her face with her towel.

The crowd continued booing as the trophy presentation commenced, interrupting both MC Tom Rinaldi of ESPN and USTA president Katrina Adams several times. Ramos was not present to receive his token of appreciation as is normally the case in Grand Slam finals, and Osaka hid her face under her visor and wept as Williams consoled her. Upon accepting her runner-up plate, Williams, also in tears, attempted to stay positive and encourage the crowd by congratulating Osaka and pleading the crowd not to boo anymore, after which the crowd began to cheer. Upon receiving the trophy, Rinaldi asked Osaka for her thoughts on playing and defeating her idol. Osaka, still in tears, deferred from his question to address the crowd, saying, "I know everyone was cheering for her and I'm sorry it had to end like this", before acknowledging her family, team, and Williams.

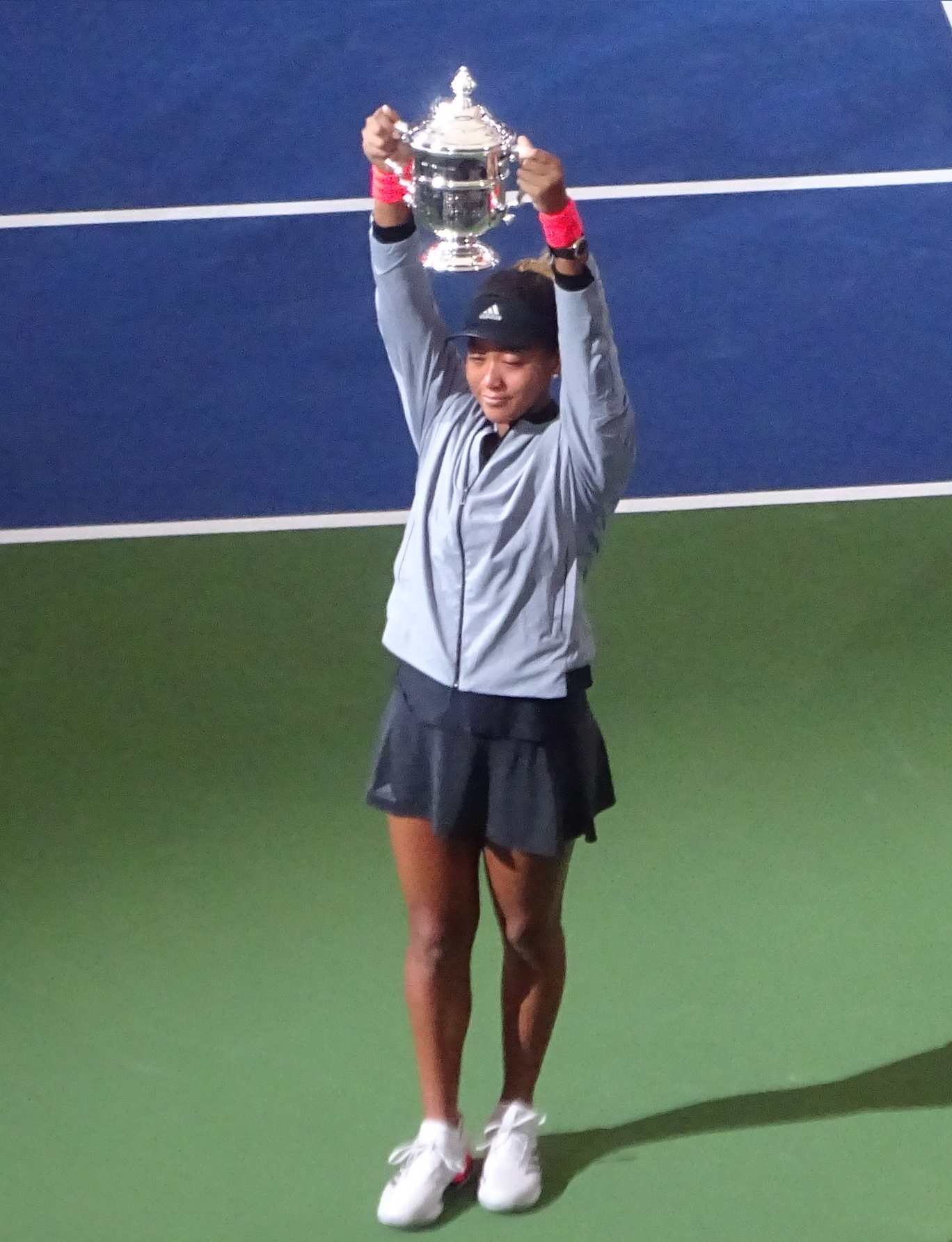
Osaka lifting the 2018 US Open – Women's singles trophy after the end of the final

Williams, in her post-match press conference, raised the gender issue again, saying that the violations made her "feel like it was a sexist remark", reasserting that men have said worse things on court without violation, and drawing upon an earlier controversy in the tournament where Alizé Cornet was given a code violation for taking off her shirt on-court (an action male players frequently do), as an example of double standards between men and women in tennis. She alluded to her actions being part of her role to stand up for women's rights and equality, and vowed to continue, a statement which drew both isolated applause and murmurs from the attendees.

== Reaction ==
The WTA believes there should be no difference in the standards of tolerance provided to the emotions expressed by men vs women. We are committed to working with the sport to ensure all players are treated the same. We do not believe this was done.

— WTA chief executive, Steve Simon

The on-court incidents of the second set polarized opinions among current and retired tennis players worldwide. Chris Evert (whose Open Era record of 6 US Open women's singles titles Williams would have broken had Williams won), while commentating the match for ESPN, claimed that while first and second code violations were common for similar incidents, it was unprecedented to issue a third code violation (and therefore game penalty) for verbal abuse. Immediately following the match, interviewed while still in the player's box, Mouratoglou admitted to coaching Williams, but doubted whether Williams saw his gestures. Mouratoglou added that "100% of coaches on 100% of matches" still commit such actions, calling the response a "hypocrite thing" and the act of Williams breaking her racket a normal human emotional reaction to the situation. Evert later agreed with Mouratoglou that "every coach coaches" despite it being a violation of rules, and with Williams's point that men have said worse things, including profanities (which Williams did not say), without penalty, but added that Williams's adamant insistence upon an apology aggravated the situation.

Billie Jean King, former US Open Champion and founder of the Women's Tennis Association, was initially supportive of Williams, tweeting following the match: "When a woman is emotional, she's 'hysterical' and she's penalized for it. When a man does the same, he's 'outspoken' and there are no repercussions. Thank you, Serena Williams, for calling out this double standard. More voices are needed to do the same." However, being interviewed by Christiane Amanpour three days later, King softened her criticism of the perceived double standard, admitting that Ramos did the right thing and could not apologize as Williams demanded in the situation, and placing some responsibility on Williams, saying that "No one was saying she was a good sport, if they are they're crazy. She was totally out of line." King, however, agreed with Evert, that Ramos could have been less strict and given Williams a softer warning prior to any disciplinary actions. In an op-ed for The New York Times, 4-time US Open champion Martina Navratilova claimed Williams's behavior was not excused by the question of whether a male player would have avoided penalty, and added that while Mouratoglou was partly right in saying that coaching was widespread, so is the issuing of penalties for doing so.

Worldwide opinion was divided following the match, with many branding Williams's behavior "embarrassing" and "ridiculous", while others claimed she was a victim of blatant sexism. The decision to penalize Williams was also criticized by many, including 2003 men's champion Andy Roddick and two-time US Open finalist Victoria Azarenka, among others. Former world number one Ana Ivanovic, though, distanced herself from the controversy, commending Osaka for her performance throughout the match while also praising Williams for being the champion she is.

However, Williams also received support from WTA chief executive Steve Simon, as well as United States Tennis Association president Katrina Adams, who had been ridiculed for hailing Williams's "class and sportsmanship" during the post-match presentation.

The International Tennis Federation later issued a statement supporting Carlos Ramos's umpiring during the match, stating that his "decisions were in accordance with the relevant rules and were re-affirmed by the US Open’s decision to fine Serena Williams for the three offences".

The match also served as an inspiration for the setting of the 2024 film Challengers.
