= Mouratoglou Tennis Academy =

Tennis academy in Biot, France

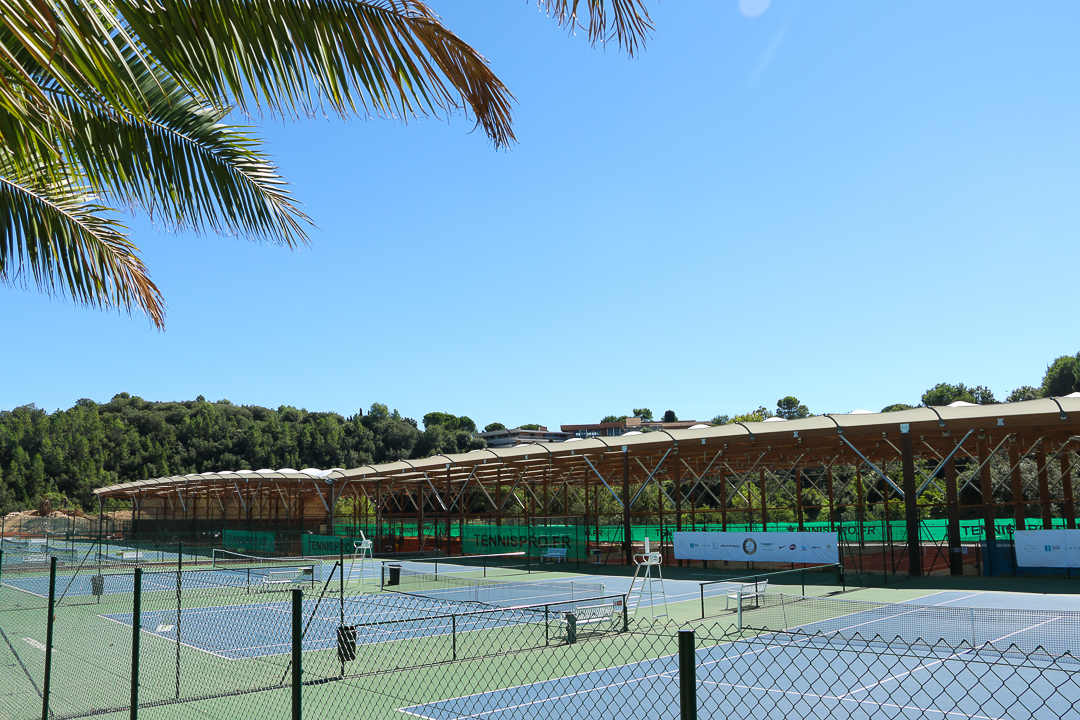
- Outdoor hardcourts at the Mouratoglou Tennis Academy
- Established: 1996; 29 years ago
- Founders: Patrick Mouratoglou; Bob Brett
- Location: Biot, Alpes-Maritimes, France
- Coordinates: 43.6206°N 7.0622°E
- Website: mouratoglou.com
- Formerly called: Bob Brett Academy

The Mouratoglou Tennis Academy is a tennis academy and training center in Biot, Alpes-Maritimes, France. Originally named the Bob Brett Academy, it was founded in 1996 by Patrick Mouratoglou and Bob Brett.

== History ==
In 1996, Patrick Mouratoglou convinced veteran coach Bob Brett to start a tennis academy together in Montreuil, originally named the Bob Brett Academy. The two partnered together for six years, with Brett teaching Mouratoglou the basics of coaching. After Brett left the academy, Mouratoglou changed its name to the Mouratoglou Tennis Academy, and it was eventually relocated to Biot, on the French Riviera, in 2016.

The Academy hosts the Verrazzano Open on the ATP Challenger Tour and the French Riviera Open, a wheelchair tennis tournament. It also hosted three editions of the Ultimate Tennis Showdown in 2020 and 2021.

== International expansion ==
Since 2020, the Mouratoglou Tennis Academy has opened five tennis centers outside of France:

- Yuan Li Sports Center, Beijing, China
- Costa Navarino, Gargalianoi, Greece
- Cala di Volpe, Sardinia, Italy
- Epsom College, Bandar Enstek, Malaysia
- Jumeirah Beach Hotel, Dubai, United Arab Emirates

== Notable players ==
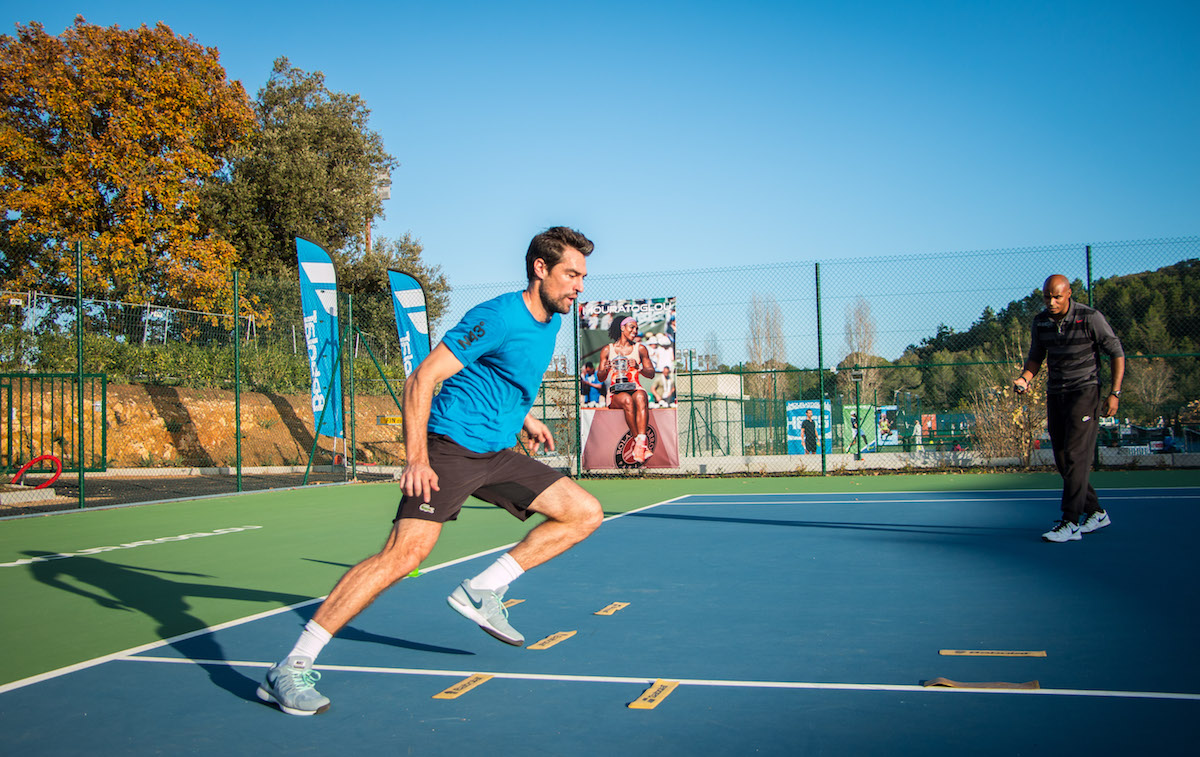
Jérémy Chardy training at the Mouratoglou Tennis Academy in 2015

- Marcos Baghdatis
- Liam Broady
- Naomi Broady
- Jérémy Chardy
- Sorana Cîrstea
- Alizé Cornet
- Grigor Dimitrov
- Ksenia Efremova
- Brenda Fruhvirtová
- Linda Fruhvirtová
- Coco Gauff
- David Goffin
- Anna Kalinskaya
- Ivo Karlović
- Moïse Kouamé
- Alizé Lim
- Paul-Henri Mathieu
- Rudolf Molleker
- Gilles Müller
- Sada Nahimana
- Benoît Paire
- Anastasia Pavlyuchenkova
- Alexei Popyrin
- Yulia Putintseva
- Aravane Rezaï
- Holger Rune
- Daria Saville
- Sergiy Stakhovsky
- Stefanos Tsitsipas
- Sachia Vickery
