= Carlos Ramos (umpire) =

Portuguese tennis umpire

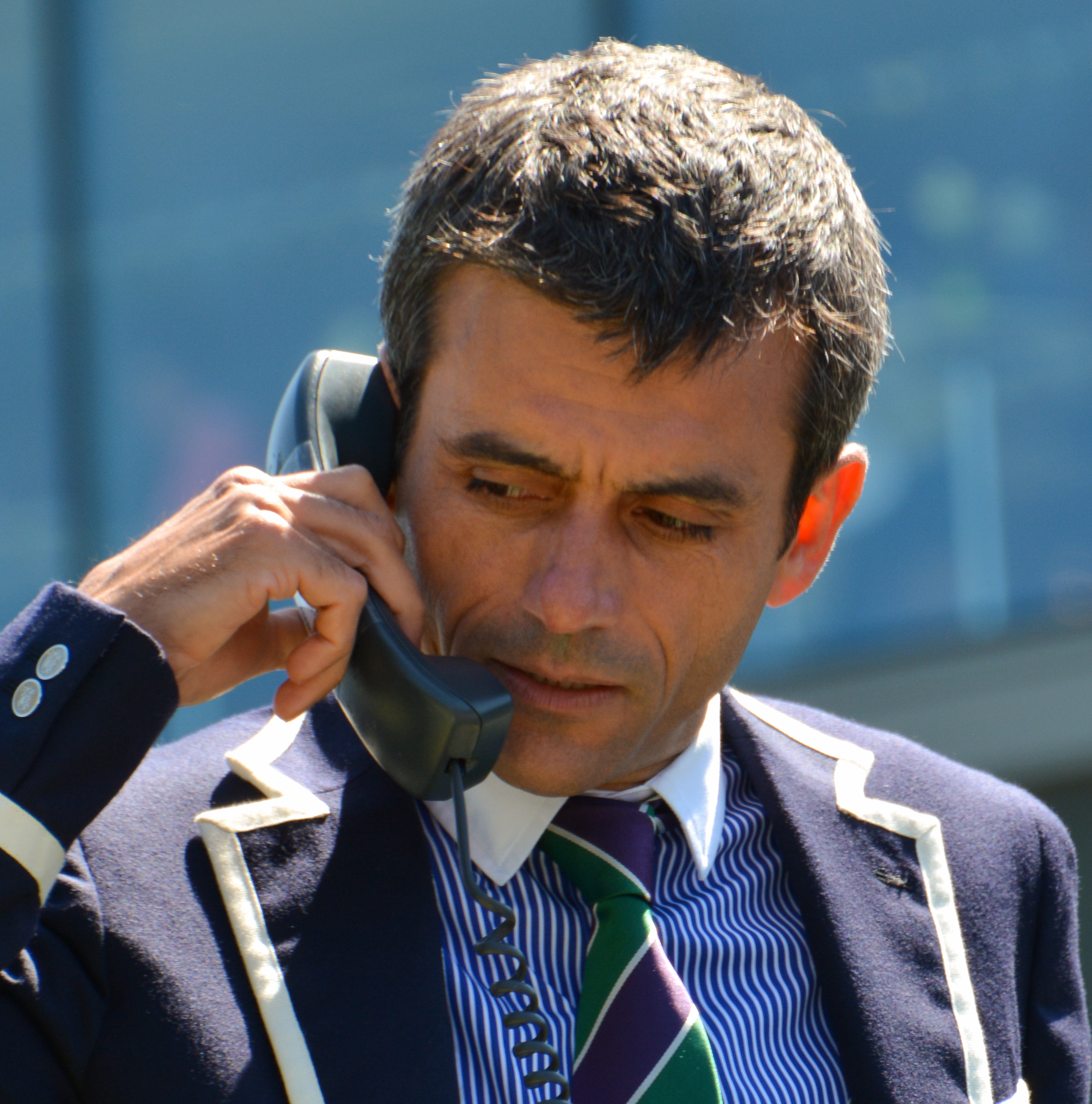
- Born: Carlos Ramos; 1972 (age 53–54); Lisbon, Portugal
- Occupation: Gold Badge ITF Chair Umpire
- Years active: 1991–2023

Carlos Ramos (born 1972) is a Portuguese tennis umpire. Ramos, a gold badge chair umpire certified by the International Tennis Federation, is one of only three persons to have chair umpired a singles finals match in all four of the Grand Slam tournaments, the other two being Alison Hughes and Louise Azemar Engzell. Ramos is also notable for umpiring many other high-profile matches and for penalizing several high-profile players during his decades-long career.

== Career ==
Ramos' Wimbledon finals debut as chair umpire came at the 2007 Wimbledon Championships – Men's singles final between Roger Federer and Rafael Nadal. In 2008 he chair umpired the match in which Venus Williams defeated her sister Serena Williams at the 2008 Wimbledon Championships – Women's singles. In 2012, he chair umpired the London Olympics final between Andy Murray and Roger Federer, making Ramos the only umpire to have chair umpired a singles final at all four Grand Slam tournaments and the Olympics. He has also officiated a number of matches in the Davis Cup.

A highly experienced umpire, Ramos developed a reputation for strict adherence to rules, to the point of being described as a "stickler". According to tennis experts, Ramos is one of the few umpires who isn't afraid to call a rules violation against elite players.

=== Grand Slam finals ===
Ramos has been in the chair of a number of Grand Slam finals during his career, including:

- 2005 Australian Open – Men's singles
- 2005 French Open – Women's singles
- 2007 Wimbledon Championships – Men's singles
- 2008 Australian Open – Men's singles
- 2008 French Open – Men's singles
- 2008 Wimbledon Championships – Women's singles
- 2011 US Open – Men's singles
- 2014 Australian Open – Men's singles
- 2016 Australian Open – Men's singles
- 2018 US Open – Women's singles

== Controversies ==
Ramos has issued violations to several high-profile tennis players who then objected to Ramos' penalties.

=== 2016 French Open ===
During the 2016 French Open, Ramos issued a code violation to Nick Kyrgios after the latter shouted at a ball boy about a towel during a match. Kyrgios continued to clash with Ramos after the violation was issued, stating later that Ramos was operating on a double standard. Kyrgios claimed his opponent (Marco Cecchinato) also was committing violation-worthy offenses.

=== 2016 Summer Olympics ===
At the 2016 Summer Olympics, Ramos issued a code violation to Andy Murray after Murray criticized Ramos' "stupid umpiring".

=== 2017 French Open ===
During the 2017 French Open, Andy Murray received two time violations from Ramos, the second of which was a loss of first serve. Murray described Ramos as a "very good umpire", but criticized the penalty. Ramos also gave Novak Djokovic a loss of first serve after Djokovic committed multiple time violations. Djokovic then yelled to himself in Serbian and flipped a tennis ball at a ball boy behind him, leading to Ramos penalizing him for unsportsmanlike conduct.

=== 2018 US Open ===
At the 2018 US Open women's singles final between Serena Williams and Naomi Osaka, Ramos issued numerous code violations to Williams. Williams' first code violation was a warning for receiving coaching during the match (Williams' coach, Patrick Mouratoglou, later admitted to coaching using hand signals, though he noted the rule against such signals was not always enforced). Williams contested this, stating her coach had only given her a thumbs-up and reassuring Ramos that she never gets coaching or cheats. Later in the match, Williams intentionally broke her racket against the ground, incurring a second code violation from Ramos, which was a point penalty. Williams continued to argue with Ramos between games, first asking and then demanding he apologize for implying she was cheating by getting coaching, and then telling him, "You stole a point from me". Willams then told Ramos: "You will never, ever, ever be on another [tennis] court of mine as long as you live ... You owe me an apology. Say it. Say you’re sorry ... How dare you insinuate that I was cheating. You stole a point from me. You're a thief, too." This exchange resulted in Ramos issuing Williams a third code violation for verbally abusing the umpire, which awarded a game to Osaka. Play was then stopped, and Williams called the tournament referee and supervisor onto the court, but the two officials upheld Ramos' violations. Williams went on to lose the match to Osaka 6–2 6–4.

Williams was fined $17,000 for the violations. After the match Williams accused Ramos of sexism by claiming that men were not penalized in the same manner for the same conduct she was accused of. While Williams' claim was backed by the WTA and Billie Jean King, Williams' behavior was criticized by the US Open (which issued the $17,000 fine) and the International Tennis Federation (ITF), which also defended Ramos' integrity. The ITF stated that Ramos' "decisions were in accordance" with the Grand Slam Rulebook Code of Conduct in which players agree to adhere—specifically Article III: Rule P of the Grand Slam Rulebook which forbids players from making a verbal remark towards an official that "implies dishonesty", such as "liar" and "thief".

Martina Navratilova provided a complex analysis of the incident, largely critical of Williams' outburst, but not dismissive of the possibility of a general double standard in tennis. Some observers noted that Williams as a player should have been experienced enough not to lose control of her emotions as she was well aware of the potential for a third violation. In pointing out that sexism was not an issue, contemporary top male players have been careful not to abuse officials despite disagreeing with the umpire's assessment of an infraction, and post-match have generally been apologetic for their on-court behavior and accepting of the penalty. Stuart Fraser supported Carlos Ramos as "one of the few umpires not afraid to call a rules violation against the top players when it is due. It is his colleagues who are letting him down with their inaction, which then leads to situations like this in which players feel they are receiving unfair treatment.” There was also criticism that Williams was acting like a diva "bigger than her sport".
