= Yann Marti =

Swiss tennis player

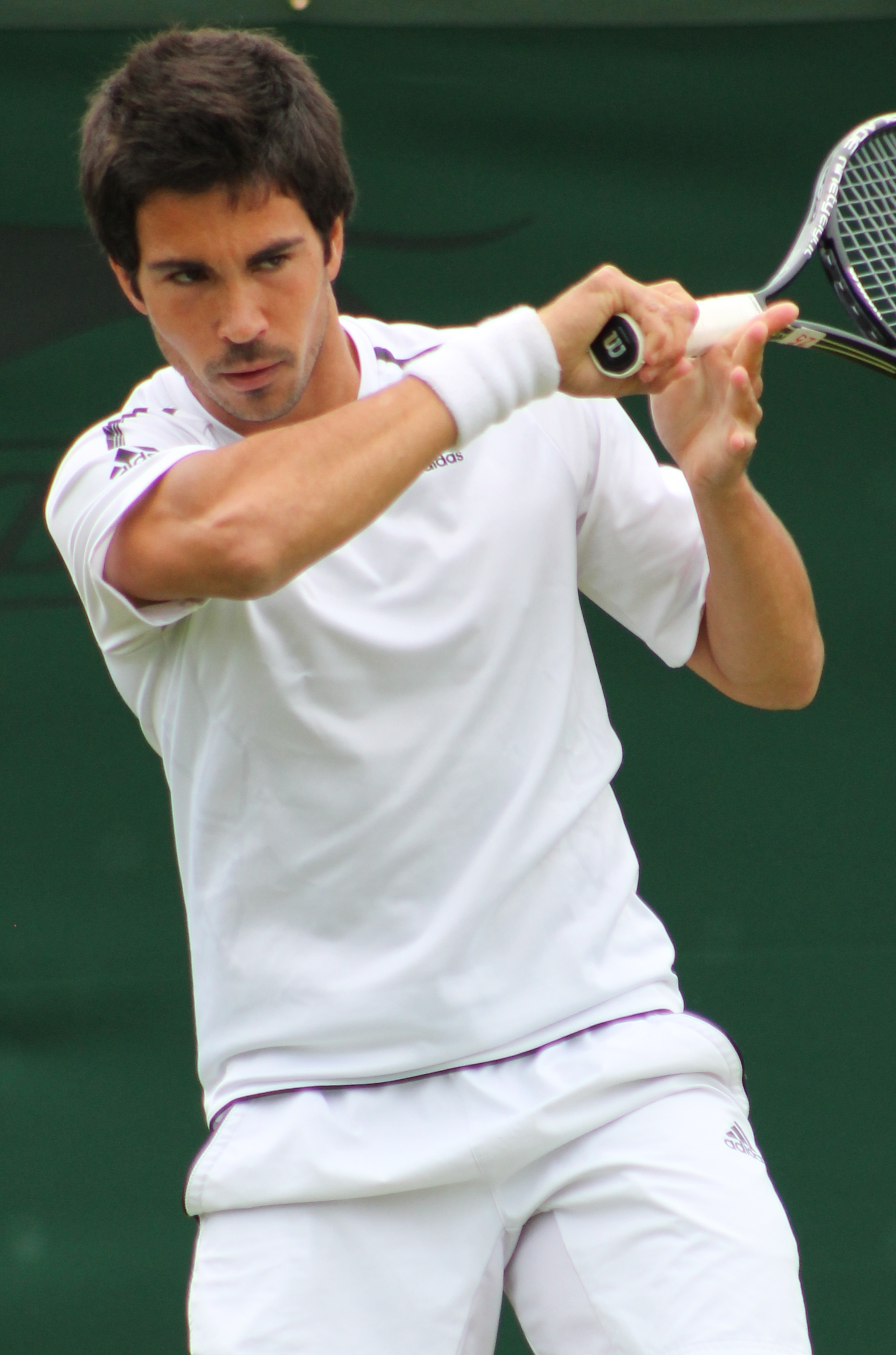
- Country (sports): Switzerland
- Residence: Venthone, Switzerland
- Born: 7 June 1988 (age 37) Sierre, Switzerland
- Height: 1.73 m (5 ft 8 in)
- Plays: Right-handed (two-handed backhand)
- Prize money: $160,259

Singles
- Career record: 2–5 (at ATP Tour level, Grand Slam level, and in Davis Cup)
- Career titles: 0
- Highest ranking: No. 200 (18 August 2014)

Grand Slam singles results
- Wimbledon: Q3 (2014)
- US Open: Q1 (2014)

Doubles
- Career record: 0–1 (at ATP Tour level, Grand Slam level, and in Davis Cup)
- Career titles: 0
- Highest ranking: No. 948 (15 October 2007)
- Last updated on: 1 January 2025.

Yann Marti (born 7 June 1988) is a Swiss former tennis player. His highest singles ranking was World No. 200, which was achieved on 18 August 2014.

In September 2014, Yann Marti was called as the fifth player and sparring partner for the Davis Cup semifinal Switzerland-Italy in Geneva together with Roger Federer, Stan Wawrinka, Marco Chiudinelli, and Michael Lammer. Although Marti ranked as the fourth Swiss player on the ATP (no. 209), Lammer (ATP 497) was preferred due to his qualities as a doubles player. He had won the doubles partnering Chiudinelli in the first round in Serbia. Swiss Severin Lüthi said that due to the importance of the game against Italy, he would not proceed with any experiment with new players at this stage.

Marti was allowed to wear the team uniform for the first time, and he stayed with the team during the whole week.

Marti came close to a nomination for the Davis Cup Final 2014 against France, when Federer was uncertain due to a back injury. Marti stayed in Switzerland, but was put on standby by the Swiss captain, in case he needed to replace Federer. He might have been preferred to Marco Chiudinelli and Michael Lammer, due to his better track record on clay. However, Federer's condition improved, and Marti was not nominated.

In 2015, Marti was called to play the first round of the Davis Cup in Belgium as the team leader after Federer and Wawrinka decided not to play and after Chiudinelli was injured. He practised during the whole week with the team (Lammer, Bossel, Laaksonen), but when the captain announced that Marti would not play the Friday singles, Marti decided to go back home to Switzerland and left the team. He said to the media that the fact that he was not picked for the singles was "the biggest disappointment of his career" and that it was better to go home now, as he must play some ITF Future tournaments and as he would anyway not be of any help for the team at this stage. However, the Swiss Federation released a press statement according to which Marti was excluded from the team by the captain due to his bad behaviour after the draw. The true reasons for Marti's exclusion remain unclear, but his sudden leave was heavily criticized in Switzerland, as he left the team at short notice and left them with only three available players for the tie (no substitute was nominated).

Rumors of a physical altercation between Marti and Marco Chiudinelli circulated. Chiudinelli would have then informed the team captain that there was a "problem" with Marti.

Wawrinka, who was not part of the team in Belgium, commented on the events on his Twitter account by saying that "Marti talks too much".

Roger Federer stated that he was briefed after the tie by the team captain and that Marti's behaviour was not acceptable, and that it was disappointing to see such things happen as it harmed the team.

Switzerland lost the tie 3-2 and had to play the last decisive rubber with Adrien Bossel, a player ranked lower than Marti. The president of the Swiss Federation, René Stammbach, was upset about Marti's behaviour and confirmed that Severin Lüthi had given the guarantee to Marti that he would have played on Sunday, which makes Marti's departure even less understandable. Stammbach further stated that "As long as I am president, Marti will never be called again for the Davis Cup."

In parallel, Marti's father and coach Jean-Marie attacked the Swiss Federation through the media and said that it was a matter of money and that the team was against Marti and still owed him money for his role as sparring partner in 2014. The Federation vehemently denied the claims of the Marti family.

Marti was never called again for the Davis Cup.
