= Bob Brett =

Australian tennis coach (1953–2021)

Bob Brett (13 November 1953 – 5 January 2021) was an Australian tennis coach. Brett worked as a ball boy for American player Arthur Ashe and veteran Australian coach Harry Hopman in the 1960s. In addition to one-on-one coaching, Brett's other roles included the founding of a tennis academy in San Remo, Italy, and a coaching job with the Japanese tennis federation.

== Early life ==
Born in Melbourne on 13 November 1953, Brett developed an interest in tennis during his childhood. In 1965, he attended the Victorian Championships and the Australian Championships at Kooyong Lawn Tennis Club, and was introduced by a fellow spectator to George MacCall, the United States United States Davis Cup team captain. MacCall gave Brett a role as a ball boy for the team's training sessions, in which he worked with several top players such as Arthur Ashe and Clark Graebner. He also met Australian coach Harry Hopman at around this time, and the following year Hopman made him a ball boy for the Australia Davis Cup team.

Unable to pursue a professional tennis career of his own, Brett became a postman in 1971 as well as a second evening job. Brett maintained an interest in tennis coaching and in 1974 he wrote to Hopman asking if he could work alongside him. Hopman agreed, and invited Brett to join him at the Port Washington Tennis Academy. On a weekly salary of $200, Brett helped Hopman at the academy with chores such as the sorting of balls, while also learning from Hopman and other coaches such as Tony Palafox. At Port Washington he met players such as John McEnroe and Vitas Gerulaitis, enhancing his knowledge by watching them during their coaching sessions.

== Coaching career ==
In 1978, on the recommendation of Hopman, Brett was appointed the coach for three players in the Peugeot-Rossignol tennis team: Andrés Gómez, Ricardo Ycaza, and Raúl Viver. During his six-month spell working with this team, Brett improved Gómez's world ranking from 240th to 68th, and Hopman rewarded him by allowing him to assemble his own team. Brett retained Gómez and Viver on this team, and also added Johan Kriek, Fritz Buehning, Tim Wilkison and José Luis Clerc. Later additions included Tim Mayotte, Mats Wilander, Guy Forget, and Henrik Sundström. Brett modelled his coaching style on Hopman's and said in a 2008 interview that he had benefitted from exposure to Hopman. He said that while he had not copied Hopman, "a lot rubbed off" on him.

In November 1987, Brett was appointed to the team of the German two-time Wimbledon champion Boris Becker. Becker had parted company with previous coach Günther Bosch in January, and had endured an unsuccessful year due to injury and loss of form. He appointed Brett initially as his fitness conditioner and practice partner, and he withdrew from competitive tennis for the early part of 1988 to focus on a return to form and recover from knee problems. Commenting on Brett in early 1988, Becker described him as his "first real trainer", contrasting him with Bosch, who he said had been "anything else but a trainer, he was my friend". Becker likened Brett's style and work ethic to that of Hopman. Under Brett, Becker regained his form in 1988, reaching the final at Wimbledon and defeating Ivan Lendl in the year-end Tennis Masters Cup. Becker thanked Brett after the latter victory, saying "I'm a very sensitive animal and he found the right words for me". Becker went on to win three grand slams during his career with Brett, and briefly obtained the world number one slot in January 1991 following his victory at the 1991 Australian Open. The two men made a mutual decision to part company in February 1991, when Brett's contract had come to an end.

Later in 1991, Brett was signed by Srdjan Ivanišević to coach his son, Croatian player Goran Ivanišević who was 19 at the time. Ivanišević's form was inconsistent in the early part of his career and he had a reputation amongst tennis pundits for emotional outbursts and "bouts of self-destruction". Under Brett's guidance, he gained mental strength and learned to avoid controversial statements off the court. Brett and Ivanišević maintained their partnership until 1995, during which time the Croat won nine titles, and also finished as losing finalist in the 1992 and the 1994 Wimbledon finals. The two men remained friends and Brett was watching on Centre Court, on Ivanišević's invitation, when the latter finally won the Wimbledon title in his fourth final.

In the late 1990s and early 2000s, Brett worked with a number of players. This included Andrei Medvedev, who reached the 1999 French Open final while working with him; Nicolas Kiefer, who he raised to the world number 4 ranking; and Mario Ančić. In 2002, Brett founded an academy in the Italian town of San Remo, named the Bob Brett Tennis Centre. Between 2000 and 2006, Brett also worked as a coach in Japanese men's tennis. Working alongside former player Shuzo Matsuoka, he worked at the Shuzo Challenge Top Junior Camp, contributing to the development of most Japanese players of that era including Kei Nishikori. He also contributed in a supervisory role in the Japanese Davis Cup team from 2000 to 2006. From 2004 to 2008 he worked with Tennis Canada as a performance consultant.

In 2004, he was introduced to his next long-term coaching client, Croatian Marin Čilić. Aged 15 at the time, Čilić was brought to San Remo by Ivanišević, and Brett went on to coach him for the next nine years. Čilić won the 2005 junior title at the French Open while working with Brett and rose to world number 9. They parted company in 2013, but when Čilić went on to win the US Open the following year he cited Brett as a "big part of this success".

== Later years and personal life ==
After parting company with Čilić, Brett was employed by the UK Lawn Tennis Association as Director of Player Development in 2014. The role was not a success and Brett left the following year, but he is credited with making a "lasting impression" on some British coaches during this period.

In 2020, Brett co-founded a non-profit association in Australia, the Kent Yamazaki & Bob Brett Tennis Foundation. Later the same year, he was awarded the ATP Tim Gullikson Career Coach Award in recognition of his "excellence, leadership, respect, and a true love for the sport of tennis and the art of coaching".

Brett died of cancer on 5 January 2021 at the age of 67.
