= 2018 US Open – Women's singles =

Women's singles
- 2018 US Open

Final
- Champion: (Japan) Naomi Osaka
- Runner-up: (United States) Serena Williams
- Score: 6–2, 6–4

Details
- Draw: 128 (16Q / 8WC)
- Seeds: 32

Events
Singles	men	women		boys	girls
Doubles	men	women	mixed	boys	girls
WC Singles	men	women	quad
WC Doubles	men	women	quad
Legends	men	women	mixed
- US Open

Naomi Osaka defeated Serena Williams in the final, 6–2, 6–4 to win the women's singles tennis title at the 2018 US Open. It was her first major title. Osaka became the first Japanese to win a major singles title. With the win, she made her top-10 rankings debut.

Sloane Stephens was the defending champion, but lost to Anastasija Sevastova in the quarterfinals.

Simona Halep's first-round loss to Kaia Kanepi marked the first time in the Open Era that the top seed lost in the first round. The losses of Halep in the first round and second seed Caroline Wozniacki in the second round marked the first time that the top two seeds failed to reach the third round, and the second time this happened at any major in the Open Era (following the 2014 French Open).

Kathinka von Deichmann became the first player from Liechtenstein to qualify for the main draw of a major.

This marked the final major appearance for former world No. 2 and 2015 WTA Finals champion Agnieszka Radwańska, who lost in the first round to Tatjana Maria. This also marked the first main-draw US Open appearance for future two-time champion Aryna Sabalenka, who reached the fourth round and was the only player in the tournament to win a set against Osaka.

== Seeds ==
1. (Romania) Simona Halep (first round)
2. (Denmark) Caroline Wozniacki (second round)
3. (United States) Sloane Stephens (quarterfinals)
4. (Germany) Angelique Kerber (third round)
5. (Czech Republic) Petra Kvitová (third round)
6. (France) Caroline Garcia (third round)
7. (Ukraine) Elina Svitolina (fourth round)
8. (Czech Republic) Karolína Plíšková (quarterfinals)
9. (Germany) Julia Görges (second round)
10. (Latvia) Jeļena Ostapenko (third round)
11. (Russia) Daria Kasatkina (second round)
12. (Spain) Garbiñe Muguruza (second round)
13. (Netherlands) Kiki Bertens (third round)
14. (United States) Madison Keys (semifinals)
15. (Belgium) Elise Mertens (fourth round)
16. (United States) Venus Williams (third round)

17. (United States) Serena Williams (final)
18. (Australia) Ashleigh Barty (fourth round)
19. (Latvia) Anastasija Sevastova (semifinals)
20. (Japan) Naomi Osaka (champion)
21. (Romania) Mihaela Buzărnescu (withdrew)
22. (Russia) Maria Sharapova (fourth round)
23. (Czech Republic) Barbora Strýcová (third round)
24. (United States) CoCo Vandeweghe (first round)
25. (Australia) Daria Gavrilova (second round)
26. (Belarus) Aryna Sabalenka (fourth round)
27. (Russia) Anastasia Pavlyuchenkova (first round)
28. (Estonia) Anett Kontaveit (first round)
29. (Slovakia) Dominika Cibulková (fourth round)
30. (Spain) Carla Suárez Navarro (quarterfinals)
31. (Slovakia) Magdaléna Rybáriková (first round)
32. (Greece) Maria Sakkari (second round)

Click on the seed number of a player to go to their draw section.

== Draw ==
Key

- Q = Qualifier
- WC = Wild card
- LL = Lucky loser
- Alt = Alternate
- ITF = ITF entry
- PR = Protected ranking
- SR = Special ranking
- SE = Special exempt
- JE = Junior exempt
- JR = Junior Accelerator Programme entrant
- CO = College Accelerator Programme entrant
- NG = Next Gen Accelerator Program entrant
- w/o = Walkover
- r = Retired
- d = Defaulted

=== Finals ===
Quarterfinals
17	(United States) Serena Williams	6	6
8	(Czech Republic) Karolína Plíšková	4	3
3	(United States) Sloane Stephens	2	3
19	(Latvia) Anastasija Sevastova	6	6
30	(Spain) Carla Suárez Navarro	4	3
14	(United States) Madison Keys	6	6
20	(Japan) Naomi Osaka	6	6
(Ukraine) Lesia Tsurenko	1	1

Semifinals
17	(United States) Serena Williams	6	6
19	(Latvia) Anastasija Sevastova	3	0
14	(United States) Madison Keys	2	4
20	(Japan) Naomi Osaka	6	6

Final
17	(United States) Serena Williams	2	4
20	(Japan) Naomi Osaka	6	6

=== Top half ===
==== Section 1 ====
First round
1	(Romania) S Halep	2	4
(Estonia) K Kanepi	6	6
Q	(Switzerland) J Teichmann	6	6
(Slovenia) D Jakupović	3	0
PR	(United States) V King	7^{7}	6
(Russia) N Vikhlyantseva	6^{4}	3
(Sweden) R Peterson	1	6	6
27	(Russia) A Pavlyuchenkova	6	4	3
17	(United States) S Williams	6	6
(Poland) M Linette	4	0
(United States) C Dolehide	3	6^{6}
(Germany) C Witthöft	6	7^{8}
(Italy) C Giorgi	6	6
WC	(United States) W Osuigwe	4	1
WC	(Russia) S Kuznetsova	3	7	3
16	(United States) V Williams	6	5	6

Second round
(Estonia) K Kanepi	6	6
Q	(Switzerland) J Teichmann	4	3
PR	(United States) V King	5	1
(Sweden) R Peterson	7	6
17	(United States) S Williams	6	6
(Germany) C Witthöft	2	2
(Italy) C Giorgi	4	5
16	(United States) V Williams	6	7

Third round
(Estonia) K Kanepi	6	7^{7}
(Sweden) R Peterson	3	6^{3}
17	(United States) S Williams	6	6
16	(United States) V Williams	1	2

Fourth round
(Estonia) K Kanepi	0	6	3
17	(United States) S Williams	6	4	6

==== Section 2 ====
First round
12	(Spain) G Muguruza	6	6
(China) S Zhang	3	0
Q	(Czech Republic) K Muchová	6	6
(Ukraine) D Yastremska	4	2
(Croatia) P Martić	4	4
(Czech Republic) L Šafářová	6	6
Q	(Tunisia) O Jabeur	1	3
18	(Australia) A Barty	6	6
32	(Greece) M Sakkari	6	6
WC	(United States) A Muhammad	3	3
LL	(United States) M Brengle	0	6	6^{4}
(United States) S Kenin	6	4	7^{7}
Q	(Czech Republic) M Bouzková	4	2
(Romania) A Bogdan	6	6
(Kazakhstan) Z Diyas	4	6^{4}
8	(Czech Republic) Ka Plíšková	6	7^{7}

Second round
12	(Spain) G Muguruza	6	4	4
Q	(Czech Republic) K Muchová	3	6	6
(Czech Republic) L Šafářová	5	3
18	(Australia) A Barty	7	6
32	(Greece) M Sakkari	6	1	4
(United States) S Kenin	4	6	6
(Romania) A Bogdan	2	3
8	(Czech Republic) Ka Plíšková	6	6

Third round
Q	(Czech Republic) K Muchová	3	4
18	(Australia) A Barty	6	6
(United States) S Kenin	4	6^{2}
8	(Czech Republic) Ka Plíšková	6	7^{7}

Fourth round
18	(Australia) A Barty	4	4
8	(Czech Republic) Ka Plíšková	6	6

==== Section 3 ====
First round
3	(United States) S Stephens	6	7
(Russia) E Rodina	1	5
Q	(Liechtenstein) K von Deichmann	6	6^{0}	2^{r}
Q	(Ukraine) A Kalinina	1	7^{7}	5
WC	(Belarus) V Azarenka	6	7
(Slovakia) V Kužmová	3	5
(Spain) S Sorribes Tormo	0	0
25	(Australia) D Gavrilova	6	6
23	(Czech Republic) B Strýcová	6	6
Q	(United States) D Lao	3	4
(Ukraine) K Kozlova	0	3
(Spain) L Arruabarrena	6	6
(Belarus) V Lapko	6	6
(Ukraine) K Bondarenko	3	3
(Japan) K Nara	2	7^{7}	5
15	(Belgium) E Mertens	6	6^{5}	7

Second round
3	(United States) S Stephens	4	7	6
Q	(Ukraine) A Kalinina	6	5	2
WC	(Belarus) V Azarenka	6	6
25	(Australia) D Gavrilova	1	2
23	(Czech Republic) B Strýcová	6	6
(Spain) L Arruabarrena	0	1
(Belarus) V Lapko	2	0
15	(Belgium) E Mertens	6	6

Third round
3	(United States) S Stephens	6	6
WC	(Belarus) V Azarenka	3	4
23	(Czech Republic) B Strýcová	3	6^{4}
15	(Belgium) E Mertens	6	7^{7}

Fourth round
3	(United States) S Stephens	6	6
15	(Belgium) E Mertens	3	3

==== Section 4 ====
First round
9	(Germany) J Görges	6	6^{5}	6
Q	(Russia) A Kalinskaya	2	7^{7}	2
Q	(United Kingdom) H Watson	1	6	3
(Russia) E Makarova	6	3	6
(Slovenia) P Hercog	6^{4}	6	4
WC	(United States) C Liu	7^{7}	1	6
(Croatia) D Vekić	2	6	3
19	(Latvia) A Sevastova	6	2	6
31	(Slovakia) M Rybáriková	2	2
(China) Q Wang	6	6
(United States) J Brady	3	3
(Romania) I-C Begu	6	6
(Poland) A Radwańska	3	3
(Germany) T Maria	6	6
(United States) S Vickery	3	6	1
7	(Ukraine) E Svitolina	6	1	6

Second round
9	(Germany) J Görges	6^{10}	3
(Russia) E Makarova	7^{12}	6
WC	(United States) C Liu	3	1
19	(Latvia) A Sevastova	6	6
(China) Q Wang	6	6
(Romania) I-C Begu	3	1
(Germany) T Maria	2	3
7	(Ukraine) E Svitolina	6	6

Third round
(Russia) E Makarova	6	1	2
19	(Latvia) A Sevastova	4	6	6
(China) Q Wang	4	4
7	(Ukraine) E Svitolina	6	6

Fourth round
19	(Latvia) A Sevastova	6	1	6
7	(Ukraine) E Svitolina	3	6	0

=== Bottom half ===
==== Section 5 ====
First round
6	(France) C Garcia	6	6
(United Kingdom) J Konta	2	2
(Puerto Rico) M Puig	6	6
(Switzerland) S Vögele	0	0
(France) K Mladenovic	6	6
(Slovenia) T Zidanšek	0	3
Q	(United States) N Gibbs	7	3	4
30	(Spain) C Suárez Navarro	5	6	6
22	(Russia) M Sharapova	6	7^{8}
Q	(Switzerland) P Schnyder	2	6^{6}
(Romania) S Cîrstea	6	3	7
(United States) A Riske	3	6	5
(United States) T Townsend	3	6	6
WC	(United States) A Anisimova	6	4	3
(Germany) A Petkovic	4	6	5
10	(Latvia) J Ostapenko	6	4	7

Second round
6	(France) C Garcia	6	1	6
(Puerto Rico) M Puig	2	6	4
(France) K Mladenovic	1	6	4
30	(Spain) C Suárez Navarro	6	4	6
22	(Russia) M Sharapova	6	7
(Romania) S Cîrstea	2	5
(United States) T Townsend	6	3	4
10	(Latvia) J Ostapenko	4	6	6

Third round
6	(France) C Garcia	7	4	6^{4}
30	(Spain) C Suárez Navarro	5	6	7^{7}
22	(Russia) M Sharapova	6	6
10	(Latvia) J Ostapenko	3	2

Fourth round
30	(Spain) C Suárez Navarro	6	6
22	(Russia) M Sharapova	4	3

==== Section 6 ====
First round
14	(United States) M Keys	6	6
(France) P Parmentier	4	4
(Kazakhstan) Y Putintseva	6^{6}	4
(United States) B Pera	7^{8}	6
PR	(Switzerland) T Bacsinszky	2	6	0
(Serbia) A Krunić	6	3	6
(Belgium) K Flipkens	6	7^{7}
24	(United States) C Vandeweghe	3	6^{3}
29	(Slovakia) D Cibulková	4	6	6
Q	(Netherlands) A Rus	6	2	3
(Russia) E Alexandrova	3	6	3
(Chinese Taipei) S-w Hsieh	6	4	6
(France) A Cornet	6	3	2
(Sweden) J Larsson	4	6	6
PR	(Russia) M Gasparyan	6^{5}	3
4	(Germany) A Kerber	7^{7}	6

Second round
14	(United States) M Keys	6	6
(United States) B Pera	4	1
(Serbia) A Krunić	6	6
(Belgium) K Flipkens	1	3
29	(Slovakia) D Cibulková	7^{7}	4	6
(Chinese Taipei) S-w Hsieh	6^{3}	6	4
(Sweden) J Larsson	2	7	4
4	(Germany) A Kerber	6	5	6

Third round
14	(United States) M Keys	4	6	6
(Serbia) A Krunić	6	1	2
29	(Slovakia) D Cibulková	3	6	6
4	(Germany) A Kerber	6	3	3

Fourth round
14	(United States) M Keys	6	6
29	(Slovakia) D Cibulková	1	3

==== Section 7 ====
First round
5	(Czech Republic) P Kvitová	6	6
(Belgium) Y Wickmayer	1	4
(China) Y Wang	6	3	6
(Slovakia) AK Schmiedlová	1	6	4
Q	(Russia) V Zvonareva	6	6^{6}	7
(Russia) A Blinkova	2	7^{8}	5
(United States) D Collins	0	6	4
26	(Belarus) A Sabalenka	6	4	6
20	(Japan) N Osaka	6	6
PR	(Germany) L Siegemund	3	2
(Romania) M Niculescu	6	5	4
Q	(Israel) J Glushko	3	7	6
(Belarus) A Sasnovich	2	6	6
(Switzerland) B Bencic	6	1	2
(Hungary) T Babos	4	7	4
11	(Russia) D Kasatkina	6	5	6

Second round
5	(Czech Republic) P Kvitová	7	6
(China) Y Wang	5	3
Q	(Russia) V Zvonareva	3	6^{7}
26	(Belarus) A Sabalenka	6	7^{9}
20	(Japan) N Osaka	6	6
Q	(Israel) J Glushko	2	0
(Belarus) A Sasnovich	6	7^{7}
11	(Russia) D Kasatkina	2	6^{3}

Third round
5	(Czech Republic) P Kvitová	5	1
26	(Belarus) A Sabalenka	7	6
20	(Japan) N Osaka	6	6
(Belarus) A Sasnovich	0	0

Fourth round
26	(Belarus) A Sabalenka	3	6	4
20	(Japan) N Osaka	6	2	6

==== Section 8 ====
First round
13	(Netherlands) K Bertens	6	7
(Czech Republic) Kr Plíšková	0	5
Q	(United States) F Di Lorenzo	6	7^{7}
(United States) C McHale	1	6^{1}
WC	(France) H Tan	3	1
Q	(Canada) E Bouchard	6	6
(Czech Republic) M Vondroušová	6	6
LL	(Germany) M Barthel	1	4
28	(Estonia) A Kontaveit	7^{7}	3	5
(Czech Republic) K Siniaková	6^{3}	6	7
WC	(Australia) L Cabrera	4	1
(Australia) A Tomljanović	6	6
(Belgium) A Van Uytvanck	3	2
(Ukraine) L Tsurenko	6	6
(Australia) S Stosur	3	2
2	(Denmark) C Wozniacki	6	6

Second round
13	(Netherlands) K Bertens	6	6
Q	(United States) F Di Lorenzo	2	1
Q	(Canada) E Bouchard	4	3
(Czech Republic) M Vondroušová	6	6
(Czech Republic) K Siniaková	6	6^{3}	7^{7}
(Australia) A Tomljanović	3	7^{7}	6^{4}
(Ukraine) L Tsurenko	6	6
2	(Denmark) C Wozniacki	4	2

Third round
13	(Netherlands) K Bertens	6^{4}	6	6^{1}
(Czech Republic) M Vondroušová	7^{7}	2	7^{7}
(Czech Republic) K Siniaková	4	0
(Ukraine) L Tsurenko	6	6

Fourth round
(Czech Republic) M Vondroušová	7^{7}	5	2
(Ukraine) L Tsurenko	6^{3}	7	6

== Statistics ==
Category	(United States) S. Williams	(Japan) Osaka
1st serve %	30/55 (55%)	40/55 (73%)
1st serve points won	19 of 30 = 63%	29 of 40 = 73%
2nd serve points won	11 of 25 = 44%	6 of 15 = 40%
Total service points won	30 of 55 = 54.54%	35 of 55 = 63.64%
Aces	3	6
Double faults	6	1
Winners	21	16
Unforced errors	21	14
Net points won	6 of 8 = 75%	0 of 1 = 0%
Break points converted	1 of 6 = 17%	4 of 5 = 80%
Return points won	20 of 55 = 36%	25 of 55 = 46%
Total points won	50	60

Preceded by 2018 Wimbledon Championships – Women's singles	Grand Slam women's singles	Succeeded by 2019 Australian Open – Women's singles
