= Severin Lüthi =

Swiss tennis player and coach

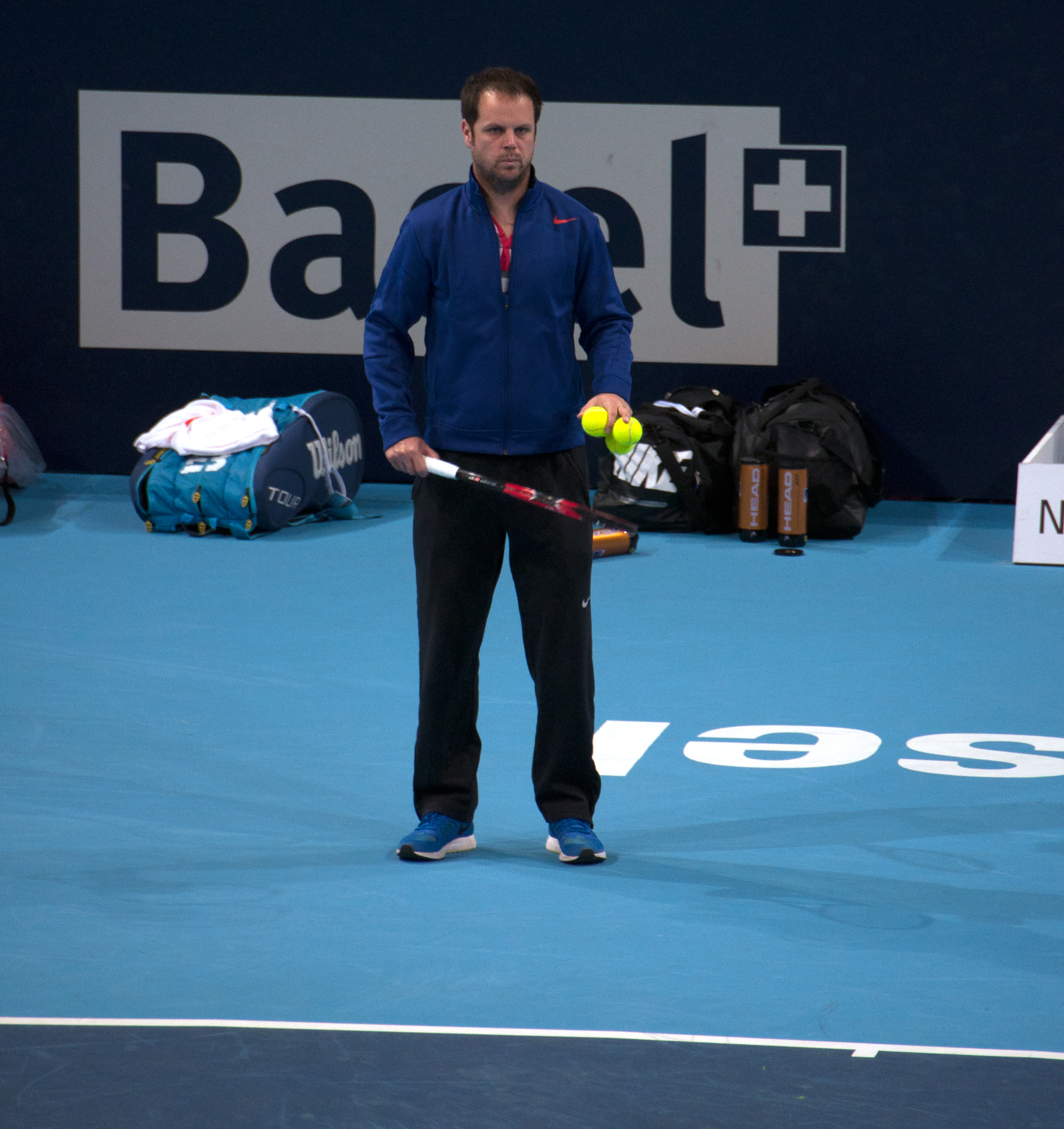
- Country (sports): Switzerland
- Born: 5 January 1976 (age 50)
- Plays: Right-handed

Singles
- Career record: 0–0
- Career titles: 0
- Highest ranking: No. 622 (23 October 1995)

Doubles
- Career record: 0–0
- Career titles: 0
- Highest ranking: No. 448 (25 November 1996)

Coaching career (2002–)
- (Switzerland) Davis Cup team (Co-trainer 2002-2005) (Switzerland) Davis Cup team (Captain since 2005) (Switzerland) Roger Federer (2007-2022) (Denmark) Holger Rune (2023)

Coaching awards and records
- Awards Swiss Coach of the Year (2017)

Severin Lüthi (born 5 January 1976) is a Swiss tennis coach and former player. He has coached the Swiss Davis Cup Team for many years and has also been a long-time coach of Roger Federer. Sporadically, he has also shown up in the coaching camp of fellow Swiss tennis star Stan Wawrinka.

Lüthi grew up in Stettlen, on the outskirts of Bern. He played tennis in his youth and once beat Gustavo Kuerten. He gave up tennis at the age of 20 and served a commercial apprenticeship with his father's company.

He briefly attended university, but found that it did not interest him. Instead, he got involved in sports, first soccer, then as assistant coach of the Swiss Davis Cup team in 2002 when Peter Carter was killed in an automobile accident in South Africa. After three years, he was promoted to team captain.

He has toured with Federer between 2007 and 2022.

He coached the team that won the Davis Cup for Switzerland in November 2014, as Roger Federer beat Richard Gasquet.

Luthi joined the coaching team of Danish tennis player Holger Rune in December 2023 and left the team in January 2024.
