= Verrazzano Open =

- 2019 Verrazzano Open

Defunct tennis tournament
- Event name: Verrazzano Open
- Location: Sophia Antipolis, France
- Venue: Mouratoglou Tennis Academy
- Category: ATP Challenger Tour
- Surface: Clay
- Draw: 32S/32Q/16D
- Prize money: €64,000+H
- Website: mouratoglou-open.com

The Verrazzano Open was a professional tennis tournament played on clay courts. It was part of the Association of Tennis Professionals (ATP) Challenger Tour. It was held in Sophia Antipolis, France in 2017 and 2019.

== Past finals ==
=== Singles ===
Year	Champion	Runner-up	Score
2019	(Germany) Dustin Brown	(Serbia) Filip Krajinović	6–3, 7–5
2018	Not held		
2017	(United Kingdom) Aljaž Bedene	(France) Benoît Paire	6–2, 6–2

=== Doubles ===
Year	Champions	Runners-up	Score
2019	(Netherlands) Thiemo de Bakker (Netherlands) Robin Haase	(France) Enzo Couacaud (France) Tristan Lamasine	6–4, 6–4
2018	Not held		
2017	(France) Tristan Lamasine (Croatia) Franko Škugor	(Belarus) Uladzimir Ignatik (Slovakia) Jozef Kovalík	6–2, 6–2
