= 2017 Toray Pan Pacific Open =

- Date: 18–24 September
- Edition: 34th
- Category: WTA Premier
- Draw: 28S / 16D
- Prize money: $1,000,000
- Surface: Hard / outdoor
- Location: Tokyo, Japan
- Venue: Ariake Forest Park
- Attendance: 30,000

Champions

Singles
- (Denmark) Caroline Wozniacki

Doubles
- (Slovenia) Andreja Klepač / (Spain) María José Martínez Sánchez
← 2016 ·	Pan Pacific Open	· 2018 →

The 2017 Toray Pan Pacific Open was a women's tennis tournament played on outdoor hard courts. It was the 34th edition of the Pan Pacific Open, and part of the Premier Series of the 2017 WTA Tour. It took place at the Ariake Coliseum in Tokyo, Japan, on 18–24 September 2017.

== Points and prize money ==
=== Point distribution ===
Event	W	F	SF	QF	Round of 16	Round of 32	Q	Q3	Q2	Q1
Singles	470	305	185	100	55	1	25	18	13	1
Doubles	470	305	185	100	1	—	—	—	—	—

=== Prize money ===
Event	W	F	SF	QF	Round of 16	Round of 32^{*}	Q3	Q2	Q1
Singles	$193,850	$103,504	$55,287	$22,518	$12,077	$7,662	$3,442	$1,830	$1,018
Doubles	$45,940	$24,548	$13,414	$6,822	$3,705	—	—	—	—
Doubles prize money per team

^* Qualifiers prize money is also the round of 32 prize money

== Singles main-draw entrants ==
=== Seeds ===
Country	Player	Rank	Seeds
ESP	Garbiñe Muguruza	1	1
CZE	Karolína Plíšková	4	2
DEN	Caroline Wozniacki	6	3
GBR	Johanna Konta	7	4
SVK	Dominika Cibulková	9	5
~~POL~~	~~Agnieszka Radwańska~~	~~11~~	~~6~~
GER	Angelique Kerber	14	7
FRA	Kristina Mladenovic	15	8
FRA	Caroline Garcia	20	9

- Rankings are as of September 11, 2017

=== Other entrants ===
The following players received wild cards into the main singles draw:

- (Japan) Risa Ozaki
- (Japan) Kurumi Nara

The following players received entry from the singles qualifying draw:

- (United States) Madison Brengle
- (Slovakia) Jana Čepelová
- (Poland) Magda Linette
- (Chinese Taipei) Hsieh Su-wei

The following player received entry as a lucky loser:

- (Belarus) Aliaksandra Sasnovich

=== Withdrawals ===
Before the tournament

- (United States) Lauren Davis → replaced by (China) Wang Qiang
- (United States) Madison Keys → replaced by (Kazakhstan) Yulia Putintseva
- (Croatia) Ana Konjuh → replaced by (Japan) Naomi Osaka
- (Czech Republic) Petra Kvitová → replaced by (Czech Republic) Kateřina Siniaková
- (Croatia) Mirjana Lučić-Baroni → replaced by (United States) Catherine Bellis
- (Poland) Agnieszka Radwańska → replaced by (Belarus) Aliaksandra Sasnovich
- (Latvia) Anastasija Sevastova → replaced by (Russia) Daria Kasatkina

== Doubles main-draw entrants ==
=== Seeds ===
Country	Player	Country	Player	Rank^{1}	Seed
TPE	Chan Hao-ching	TPE	Chan Yung-jan	15	1
CAN	Gabriela Dabrowski	CHN	Xu Yifan	38	2
POL	Alicja Rosolska	USA	Abigail Spears	57	3
SLO	Andreja Klepač	ESP	María José Martínez Sánchez	60	4

- Rankings are as of September 11, 2017

=== Other entrants ===
The following pair received a wildcard into the doubles main draw:

- (Japan) Mari Osaka / (Japan) Naomi Osaka

== Finals ==
=== Singles ===
- (Denmark) Caroline Wozniacki def. (Russia) Anastasia Pavlyuchenkova, 6–0, 7–5

=== Doubles ===
- (Slovenia) Andreja Klepač / (Spain) María José Martínez Sánchez def. (Australia) Daria Gavrilova / (Russia) Daria Kasatkina, 6–3, 6–2
