= 2017 Toray Pan Pacific Open – Doubles =

Doubles
- 2017 Toray Pan Pacific Open

Final
- Champions: (Slovenia) Andreja Klepač (Spain) María José Martínez Sánchez
- Runners-up: (Australia) Daria Gavrilova (Russia) Daria Kasatkina
- Score: 6–3, 6–2

Details
- Draw: 16
- Seeds: 4

Events
Singles	Doubles
← 2016 ·	Toray Pan Pacific Open	· 2018 →

Sania Mirza and Barbora Strýcová were the defending champions, but chose not to participate this year.

Andreja Klepač and María José Martínez Sánchez won the title, defeating Daria Gavrilova and Daria Kasatkina in the final, 6–3, 6–2.

== Seeds ==
1. (Chinese Taipei) Chan Hao-ching / (Chinese Taipei) Chan Yung-jan (first round)
2. (Canada) Gabriela Dabrowski / (China) Xu Yifan (semifinals)
3. (Poland) Alicja Rosolska / (United States) Abigail Spears (quarterfinals)
4. (Slovenia) Andreja Klepač / (Spain) María José Martínez Sánchez (champions)

== Draw ==
=== Key ===
- Q = Qualifier
- WC = Wild card
- LL = Lucky loser
- Alt = Alternate
- SE = Special exempt
- PR = Protected ranking
- ITF = ITF entry
- JE = Junior exempt
- w/o = Walkover
- r = Retired
- d = Defaulted
- SR = Special ranking

First round
1	(Chinese Taipei) H-c Chan (Chinese Taipei) Y-j Chan	6^{8}	6	[11]
(Japan) K Nara (Japan) R Ozaki	7^{10}	1	[13]
(Australia) D Gavrilova (Russia) D Kasatkina	1	7	[10]
(Ukraine) L Kichenok (Slovenia) K Srebotnik	6	5	[7]
3	(Poland) A Rosolska (United States) A Spears	6	6
(United States) R Atawo (Croatia) D Jurak	4	4
WC	(Japan) M Osaka (Japan) N Osaka	5	4
(Japan) M Ninomiya (Czech Republic) R Voráčová	7	6
(United States) N Melichar (United Kingdom) A Smith	4	1
(Japan) E Hozumi (Japan) M Kato	6	6
(Japan) S Aoyama (China) Z Yang	0	3
4	(Slovenia) A Klepač (Spain) MJ Martínez Sánchez	6	6
(Romania) R Olaru (Ukraine) O Savchuk	6	7
(Ukraine) N Kichenok (Australia) An Rodionova	4	5
(China) Y Duan (Chinese Taipei) S-w Hsieh	5	6	[6]
2	(Canada) G Dabrowski (China) Y Xu	7	4	[10]

Quarterfinals
(Japan) K Nara (Japan) R Ozaki	1	4
(Australia) D Gavrilova (Russia) D Kasatkina	6	6
3	(Poland) A Rosolska (United States) A Spears	5	6	[5]
(Japan) M Ninomiya (Czech Republic) R Voráčová	7	1	[10]
(Japan) E Hozumi (Japan) M Kato	3	5
4	(Slovenia) A Klepač (Spain) MJ Martínez Sánchez	6	7
(Romania) R Olaru (Ukraine) O Savchuk	0	6	[7]
2	(Canada) G Dabrowski (China) Y Xu	6	3	[10]

Semifinals
(Australia) D Gavrilova (Russia) D Kasatkina	6	3	[10]
(Japan) M Ninomiya (Czech Republic) R Voráčová	2	6	[7]
4	(Slovenia) A Klepač (Spain) MJ Martínez Sánchez	7	3	[10]
2	(Canada) G Dabrowski (China) Y Xu	5	6	[3]

Final
(Australia) D Gavrilova (Russia) D Kasatkina	3	2
4	(Slovenia) A Klepač (Spain) MJ Martínez Sánchez	6	6
