= 2018 Toray Pan Pacific Open – Singles =

Singles
- 2018 Toray Pan Pacific Open

Final
- Champion: (Czech Republic) Karolína Plíšková
- Runner-up: (Japan) Naomi Osaka
- Score: 6–4, 6–4

Details
- Draw: 28
- Seeds: 8

Events
Singles	Doubles
- Toray Pan Pacific Open

Caroline Wozniacki was the two-time defending champion, but lost in the second round to Camila Giorgi.

Karolína Plíšková won the title, defeating Naomi Osaka in the final, 6–4, 6–4. Plíšková won the title after saving two match points Alison Riske had against her in the quarterfinals.

== Seeds ==
The top four seeds received a bye into the second round.

1. (Denmark) Caroline Wozniacki (second round)
2. (France) Caroline Garcia (quarterfinals)
3. (Japan) Naomi Osaka (final)
4. (Czech Republic) Karolína Plíšková (champion)
5. (United States) Sloane Stephens (first round)
6. (Spain) Garbiñe Muguruza (second round)
7. (Australia) Ashleigh Barty (second round)
8. (Czech Republic) Barbora Strýcová (quarterfinals)

== Draw ==
Key

- Q = Qualifier
- WC = Wild card
- LL = Lucky loser
- Alt = Alternate
- ITF = ITF entry
- PR = Protected ranking
- SR = Special ranking
- SE = Special exempt
- JE = Junior exempt
- JR = Junior Accelerator Programme entrant
- CO = College Accelerator Programme entrant
- NG = Next Gen Accelerator Program entrant
- w/o = Walkover
- r = Retired
- d = Defaulted

=== Finals ===
Semifinals
(Italy) Camila Giorgi	2	3
3	(Japan) Naomi Osaka	6	6
4	(Czech Republic) Karolína Plíšková	6	4	6
(Croatia) Donna Vekić	2	6	3

Final
3	(Japan) Naomi Osaka	4	4
4	(Czech Republic) Karolína Plíšková	6	6

=== Top half ===
First round
Q	(Japan) M Doi	2	1
(Italy) C Giorgi	6	6
WC	(Belarus) V Azarenka	6	7
WC	(Japan) K Nara	4	5
(United States) C Vandeweghe	6	3	5
7	(Australia) A Barty	4	6	7
Q	(Japan) N Hibino	1	7	3
(Slovakia) D Cibulková	6	5	6
(France) K Mladenovic	3	6^{5}
(Estonia) A Kontaveit	6	7^{7}
Q	(Kazakhstan) Z Diyas	4	4
8	(Czech Republic) B Strýcová	6	6

Second round
1/WC	(Denmark) C Wozniacki	2	6	4
(Italy) C Giorgi	6	2	6
WC	(Belarus) V Azarenka	6	6
7	(Australia) A Barty	4	2
3	(Japan) N Osaka	6	6
(Slovakia) D Cibulková	2	1
(Estonia) A Kontaveit	6^{5}	6	5
8	(Czech Republic) B Strýcová	7^{7}	3	7

Quarterfinals
(Italy) C Giorgi	5
WC	(Belarus) V Azarenka	3^{r}
3	(Japan) N Osaka	6	6
8	(Czech Republic) B Strýcová	3	4

Semifinals
(Italy) C Giorgi	2	3
3	(Japan) N Osaka	6	6

=== Bottom half ===
First round
6	(Spain) G Muguruza	6	6
(Switzerland) B Bencic	2	4
Q	(Canada) E Bouchard	4	4
Q	(United States) A Riske	6	6
WC	(Czech Republic) Kr Plíšková	6^{2}	6	6^{8}
(Australia) D Gavrilova	7^{7}	3	7^{10}
5	(United States) S Stephens	4	4
(Croatia) D Vekić	6	6
Q	(Canada) G Dabrowski	2	0
(United Kingdom) J Konta	6	6
(Russia) A Pavlyuchenkova	6	6
(Belarus) A Sasnovich	3	4

Second round
6	(Spain) G Muguruza	1	2
Q	(United States) A Riske	6	6
(Australia) D Gavrilova	6	4	4
4	(Czech Republic) Ka Plíšková	4	6	6
(Croatia) D Vekić	6	7
(United Kingdom) J Konta	3	5
(Russia) A Pavlyuchenkova	4	6	5
2	(France) C Garcia	6	2	7

Quarterfinals
Q	(United States) A Riske	1	7^{7}	6^{4}
4	(Czech Republic) Ka Plíšková	6	6^{5}	7^{7}
(Croatia) D Vekić	6	6
2	(France) C Garcia	3	4

Semifinals
4	(Czech Republic) Ka Plíšková	6	4	6
(Croatia) D Vekić	2	6	3

== Qualifying ==
=== Seeds ===
1. (Kazakhstan) Zarina Diyas (qualified)
2. (Poland) Magda Linette (qualifying competition)
3. (United States) Alison Riske (qualified)
4. (Canada) Eugenie Bouchard (qualified)
5. (China) Duan Yingying (withdrew)
6. (Croatia) Jana Fett (first round)
7. (Japan) Nao Hibino (qualified)
8. (Germany) Antonia Lottner (qualifying competition)
9. (Japan) Misaki Doi (qualified)
10. (Japan) Miyu Kato (withdrew)
11. (Japan) Ayano Shimizu (qualifying competition)
12. (Germany) Anna Zaja (first round)

=== Qualifiers ===
1. (Kazakhstan) Zarina Diyas
2. (Japan) Nao Hibino
3. (United States) Alison Riske
4. (Canada) Eugenie Bouchard
5. (Canada) Gabriela Dabrowski
6. (Japan) Misaki Doi

=== Qualifying draw ===
==== First qualifier ====
First round
1	(Kazakhstan) Zarina Diyas	6	6
(Japan) Miyabi Inoue	4	3
(Japan) Risa Ozaki	6	7^{7}
12	(Germany) Anna Zaja	2	6^{2}

Qualifying competition
1	(Kazakhstan) Zarina Diyas	6	6
(Japan) Risa Ozaki	1	0

==== Second qualifier ====
First round
2	(Poland) Magda Linette	7^{10}	6
(Japan) Momoko Kobori	6^{8}	3
(Japan) Erika Sema	0	0
7	(Japan) Nao Hibino	6	6

Qualifying competition
2	(Poland) Magda Linette	2	7^{7}	3
7	(Japan) Nao Hibino	6	6^{3}	6

==== Third qualifier ====
First round
3	(United States) Alison Riske	6	6
(Russia) Valeria Savinykh	4	4
WC	(Japan) Mai Hontama	1	4
11	(Japan) Ayano Shimizu	6	6

Qualifying competition
3	(United States) Alison Riske	6	6
11	(Japan) Ayano Shimizu	3	2

==== Fourth qualifier ====
First round
4	(Canada) Eugenie Bouchard	6	6
WC	(Japan) Moyuka Uchijima	1	1
WC	(Japan) Chihiro Muramatsu	6	6
Alt	(Japan) Misa Eguchi	2	0

Qualifying competition
4	(Canada) Eugenie Bouchard	6	2	7
WC	(Japan) Chihiro Muramatsu	1	6	5

==== Fifth qualifier ====
First round
Alt	(Canada) Gabriela Dabrowski	6	6
(Japan) Miharu Imanishi	3	2
(Japan) Mari Osaka	3	6	3
8	(Germany) Antonia Lottner	6	4	6

Qualifying competition
Alt	(Canada) Gabriela Dabrowski	6	6
8	(Germany) Antonia Lottner	3	2

==== Sixth qualifier ====
First round
6	(Croatia) Jana Fett	3	2
(United States) Danielle Lao	6	6
WC	(Japan) Haruka Kaji	0	2
9	(Japan) Misaki Doi	6	6

Qualifying competition
(United States) Danielle Lao	5	5
9	(Japan) Misaki Doi	7	7
