= 2017 Toray Pan Pacific Open – Singles =

Singles
- 2017 Toray Pan Pacific Open

Final
- Champion: (Denmark) Caroline Wozniacki
- Runner-up: (Russia) Anastasia Pavlyuchenkova
- Score: 6–0, 7–5

Details
- Draw: 28
- Seeds: 8

Events
| Singles | Doubles |
- Toray Pan Pacific Open

Caroline Wozniacki was the defending champion and successfully retained her title, defeating Anastasia Pavlyuchenkova in the final, 6–0, 7–5. This marked Wozniacki's first title of 2017 and snapped a six-match losing streak in tournament finals.

== Seeds ==
1. (Spain) Garbiñe Muguruza (semifinals)
2. (Czech Republic) Karolína Plíšková (quarterfinals)
3. (Denmark) Caroline Wozniacki (champion)
4. (United Kingdom) Johanna Konta (second round)
5. (Slovakia) Dominika Cibulková (quarterfinals, retired)
6. (Poland) Agnieszka Radwańska (withdrew)
7. (Germany) Angelique Kerber (semifinals)
8. (France) Kristina Mladenovic (first round)
9. (France) Caroline Garcia (quarterfinals)

== Draw ==
Key

- Q = Qualifier
- WC = Wild card
- LL = Lucky loser
- Alt = Alternate
- ITF = ITF entry
- PR = Protected ranking
- SR = Special ranking
- SE = Special exempt
- JE = Junior exempt
- JR = Junior Accelerator Programme entrant
- CO = College Accelerator Programme entrant
- NG = Next Gen Accelerator Program entrant
- w/o = Walkover
- r = Retired
- d = Defaulted

=== Finals ===
Semifinals
1 | (Spain) Garbiñe Muguruza | 2 | 0
3 | (Denmark) Caroline Wozniacki | 6 | 6
(Russia) Anastasia Pavlyuchenkova | 6 | 6^{4} | 6
7 | (Germany) Angelique Kerber | 0 | 7^{7} | 4

Final
3 | (Denmark) Caroline Wozniacki | 6 | 7
(Russia) Anastasia Pavlyuchenkova | 0 | 5

=== Top half ===
First round
Q | (Chinese Taipei) S-w Hsieh | 6 | 1 | 1
(Puerto Rico) M Puig | 2 | 6 | 6
WC | (Japan) K Nara | 2 | 6 | 6
(Kazakhstan) Y Putintseva | 6 | 4 | 2
LL | (Belarus) A Sasnovich | 4 | 3
9 | (France) C Garcia | 6 | 6
WC | (Japan) R Ozaki | 2 | 6^{5}
(United States) S Rogers | 6 | 7^{7}
(Czech Republic) K Siniaková | 1 | 6 | 6
Q | (Slovakia) J Čepelová | 6 | 3 | 4
(Spain) C Suárez Navarro | 3 | 3
5 | (Slovakia) D Cibulková | 6 | 6

Second round
1 | (Spain) G Muguruza | 6 | 6
(Puerto Rico) M Puig | 4 | 0
WC | (Japan) K Nara | 1 | 3
9 | (France) C Garcia | 6 | 6
3 | (Denmark) C Wozniacki | 4 | 6 | 6
(United States) S Rogers | 6 | 1 | 4
(Czech Republic) K Siniaková | 2 | 2
5 | (Slovakia) D Cibulková | 6 | 6

Quarterfinals
1 | (Spain) G Muguruza | 6 | 6
9 | (France) C Garcia | 2 | 4
3 | (Denmark) C Wozniacki | 3 | 7^{7} | 3
5 | (Slovakia) D Cibulková | 6 | 6^{5} | 1^{r}

Semifinals
1 | (Spain) G Muguruza | 2 | 0
3 | (Denmark) C Wozniacki | 6 | 6

=== Bottom half ===
First round
8 | (France) K Mladenovic | 0 | 0
(China) Q Wang | 6 | 6
(Russia) A Pavlyuchenkova | 4 | 6 | 6
(United States) C Bellis | 6 | 0 | 4
(Slovakia) M Rybáriková | 6^{4} | 6^{2}
(Czech Republic) B Strýcová | 7^{7} | 7^{7}
7 | (Germany) A Kerber | 6 | 6
(Japan) N Osaka | 3 | 4
Q | (United States) M Brengle | 6 | 2 | 4
(Russia) D Kasatkina | 3 | 6 | 6
Q | (Poland) M Linette | 2 | 6 | 7^{7}
(Australia) D Gavrilova | 6 | 0 | 6^{3}

Second round
(China) Q Wang | 4 | 6 | 2
(Russia) A Pavlyuchenkova | 6 | 4 | 6
(Czech Republic) B Strýcová | 7 | 7^{7}
4 | (United Kingdom) J Konta | 5 | 6^{5}
7 | (Germany) A Kerber | 7^{7} | 6
(Russia) D Kasatkina | 6^{5} | 3
Q | (Poland) M Linette | 2 | 1
2 | (Czech Republic) Ka Plíšková | 6 | 6

Quarterfinals
(Russia) A Pavlyuchenkova | 5 | 6 | 6
(Czech Republic) B Strýcová | 7 | 3 | 1
7 | (Germany) A Kerber | 7^{7} | 7
2 | (Czech Republic) Ka Plíšková | 6^{5} | 5

Semifinals
(Russia) A Pavlyuchenkova | 6 | 6^{4} | 6
7 | (Germany) A Kerber | 0 | 7^{7} | 4

== Qualifying ==
=== Seeds ===
1. (Poland) Magda Linette (qualified)
2. (United States) Madison Brengle (qualified)
3. (Belarus) Aliaksandra Sasnovich (qualifying competition, lucky loser)
4. (Slovakia) Jana Čepelová (qualified)
5. (China) Duan Yingying (qualifying competition)
6. (Chinese Taipei) Hsieh Su-wei (qualified)
7. (Kazakhstan) Zarina Diyas (withdrew, still competing in Tokyo International)
8. (Ukraine) Kateryna Bondarenko (qualifying competition)

=== Qualifiers ===
1. (Poland) Magda Linette
2. (United States) Madison Brengle
3. (Slovakia) Jana Čepelová
4. (Chinese Taipei) Hsieh Su-wei

=== Lucky loser ===
1. (Belarus) Aliaksandra Sasnovich

=== Qualifying draw ===
==== First qualifier ====
First round
1 | (Poland) Magda Linette | 6 | 4 | 6
WC | (Japan) Makoto Ninomiya | 2 | 6 | 4
WC | (Japan) Moyuka Uchijima | 6 | 7
(Poland) Alicja Rosolska | 4 | 5
WC | (Japan) Ayumi Miyamoto | 1 | 2
(Canada) Gabriela Dabrowski | 6 | 6
WC | (Japan) Momoko Kobori | 4 | 4
8 | (Ukraine) Kateryna Bondarenko | 6 | 6

Second round
1 | (Poland) Magda Linette | 6 | 6
WC | (Japan) Moyuka Uchijima | 2 | 1
(Canada) Gabriela Dabrowski | 2 | 2
8 | (Ukraine) Kateryna Bondarenko | 6 | 6

Qualifying competition
1 | (Poland) Magda Linette | 6 | 2 | 6
8 | (Ukraine) Kateryna Bondarenko | 1 | 6 | 3

==== Second qualifier ====
First round
2 | (United States) Madison Brengle | 6 | 6
(Japan) Haruka Kaji | 3 | 4
(Japan) Eri Hozumi | 6 | 7^{7}
(United States) Abigail Spears | 4 | 6^{4}
(United States) Danielle Collins | 6 | 6
(Japan) Ayano Shimizu | 1 | 3
(China) Yang Zhaoxuan | 4 | 6 | 6
Alt | (United States) Raquel Atawo | 6 | 4 | 0

Second round
2 | (United States) Madison Brengle | 6 | 6
(Japan) Eri Hozumi | 2 | 3
(United States) Danielle Collins | 6 | 6
(China) Yang Zhaoxuan | 4 | 4

Qualifying competition
2 | (United States) Madison Brengle | 6 | 6
(United States) Danielle Collins | 4 | 1

==== Third qualifier ====
First round
3 | (Belarus) Aliaksandra Sasnovich | 6 | 6
(Japan) Yuuki Tanaka | 3 | 2
WC | (Japan) Ayaka Okuno | 1 | 2
(Turkey) Başak Eraydın | 6 | 6
(Japan) Mayo Hibi | 6 | 6
(Croatia) Darija Jurak | 3 | 0
(Japan) Akiko Omae | 1 | 2
6 | (Chinese Taipei) Hsieh Su-wei | 6 | 6

Second round
3 | (Belarus) Aliaksandra Sasnovich | 6 | 6
(Turkey) Başak Eraydın | 4 | 0
(Japan) Mayo Hibi | 3 | 1
6 | (Chinese Taipei) Hsieh Su-wei | 6 | 6

Qualifying competition
3 | (Belarus) Aliaksandra Sasnovich | 4 | 3
6 | (Chinese Taipei) Hsieh Su-wei | 6 | 6

==== Fourth qualifier ====
First round
4 | (Slovakia) Jana Čepelová | 6 | 6
(Spain) María José Martínez Sánchez | 1 | 4
(Slovenia) Andreja Klepač | 3 | 2
(Japan) Shuko Aoyama | 6 | 6
(Japan) Mari Osaka | 0 | 6 | 6
(Japan) Erika Sema | 6 | 1 | 4
(Poland) Magdalena Fręch | 5 | 6 | 2
5 | (China) Duan Yingying | 7 | 3 | 6

Second round
4 | (Slovakia) Jana Čepelová | 3 | 6 | 6
(Japan) Shuko Aoyama | 6 | 2 | 4
(Japan) Mari Osaka | 5 | 4
5 | (China) Duan Yingying | 7 | 6

Qualifying competition
4 | (Slovakia) Jana Čepelová | 7 | 7^{7}
5 | (China) Duan Yingying | 5 | 6^{4}
