= 2018 Toray Pan Pacific Open =

- Date: 17–23 September
- Edition: 35th
- Category: WTA Premier
- Draw: 28S / 16D
- Prize money: $799,000
- Surface: Hard / indoor
- Location: Tachikawa, Tokyo, Japan
- Venue: Arena Tachikawa Tachihi

Champions

Singles
- (Czech Republic) Karolína Plíšková

Doubles
- (Japan) Miyu Kato / (Japan) Makoto Ninomiya
- Pan Pacific Open

The 2018 Toray Pan Pacific Open is a women's tennis tournament played on indoor hard courts. It was the 35th edition of the Pan Pacific Open, and part of the Premier Series of the 2018 WTA Tour. It took place at the Arena Tachikawa Tachihi in Tachikawa, Tokyo, Japan, on 17–23 September 2018.

== Finals ==
=== Singles ===
- (Czech Republic) Karolína Plíšková defeated (Japan) Naomi Osaka 6–4, 6–4

=== Doubles ===
- (Japan) Miyu Kato / (Japan) Makoto Ninomiya defeated (Czech Republic) Andrea Sestini Hlaváčková / (Czech Republic) Barbora Strýcová, 6–4, 6–4

== Points and prize money ==
=== Point distribution ===
Event	W	F	SF	QF	Round of 16	Round of 32	Q	Q2	Q1
Singles	470	305	185	100	55	1	25	13	1
Doubles	470	305	185	100	1	—N/a	—N/a	—N/a	—N/a

=== Prize money ===
Event	W	F	SF	QF	Round of 16	Round of 32^{*}	Q2	Q1
Singles	$137,125	$76,063	$39,080	$21,010	$11,265	$7,150	$3,447	$1,750
Doubles	$42,850	$22,900	$12,510	$6,365	$3,460	—N/a	—N/a	—N/a
Doubles prize money per team

^* Qualifiers prize money is also the round of 32 prize money

== Singles main-draw entrants ==
=== Seeds ===
Country	Player	Rank	Seeds
DEN	Caroline Wozniacki	2	1
FRA	Caroline Garcia	4	2
JPN	Naomi Osaka	7	3
CZE	Karolína Plíšková	8	4
USA	Sloane Stephens	9	5
ESP	Garbiñe Muguruza	14	6
AUS	Ashleigh Barty	17	7
CZE	Barbora Strýcová	25	8

- Rankings are as of September 10, 2018

=== Other entrants ===
The following players received wild cards into the main singles draw:

- (Belarus) Victoria Azarenka
- (Japan) Kurumi Nara
- (Czech Republic) Kristýna Plíšková
- (Denmark) Caroline Wozniacki

The following players received entry from the singles qualifying draw:

- (Canada) Eugenie Bouchard
- (Canada) Gabriela Dabrowski
- (Kazakhstan) Zarina Diyas
- (Japan) Misaki Doi
- (Japan) Nao Hibino
- (United States) Alison Riske

=== Withdrawals ===
- (Romania) Mihaela Buzărnescu → replaced by (Belarus) Aliaksandra Sasnovich
- (Germany) Angelique Kerber → replaced by (Switzerland) Belinda Bencic
- (United States) Madison Keys → replaced by (Estonia) Anett Kontaveit
- (Belgium) Elise Mertens → replaced by (Russia) Anastasia Pavlyuchenkova
- (Latvia) Anastasija Sevastova → replaced by (Italy) Camila Giorgi
- (Spain) Carla Suárez Navarro → replaced by (Croatia) Donna Vekić

=== Retirements ===
- (Belarus) Victoria Azarenka

== Doubles main-draw entrants ==
=== Seeds ===
Country	Player	Country	Player	Rank^{1}	Seed
CZE	Andrea Sestini Hlaváčková	CZE	Barbora Strýcová	18	1
CAN	Gabriela Dabrowski	CHN	Xu Yifan	27	2
TPE	Chan Hao-ching	CHN	Yang Zhaoxuan	48	3
USA	Raquel Atawo	GER	Anna-Lena Grönefeld	59	4

- Rankings are as of September 10, 2018

=== Other entrants ===
The following pair received a wildcard into the doubles main draw:

- (Japan) Erina Hayashi / (Japan) Moyuka Uchijima
