= 2016 Toray Pan Pacific Open – Singles =

Singles
- 2016 Toray Pan Pacific Open

Final
- Champion: (Denmark) Caroline Wozniacki
- Runner-up: (Japan) Naomi Osaka
- Score: 7–5, 6–3

Details
- Draw: 28 (4 Q / 4 WC )
- Seeds: 8

Events
Singles	Doubles
- Pan Pacific Open

Caroline Wozniacki defeated Naomi Osaka in the final, 7–5, 6–3 to win the singles tennis title at the 2016 Toray Pan Pacific Open.

Agnieszka Radwańska was the defending champion, but lost in the semifinals to Wozniacki.

== Seeds ==
The top four seeds received a bye into the second round.

1. (Spain) Garbiñe Muguruza (quarterfinals)
2. (Poland) Agnieszka Radwańska (semifinals)
3. (Czech Republic) Karolína Plíšková (second round)
4. (Spain) Carla Suárez Navarro (second round)
5. (United States) Madison Keys (first round)
6. (Slovakia) Dominika Cibulková (second round)
7. (Czech Republic) Petra Kvitová (second round)
8. (Russia) Anastasia Pavlyuchenkova (second round)

== Draw ==
Key

- Q = Qualifier
- WC = Wild card
- LL = Lucky loser
- Alt = Alternate
- ITF = ITF entry
- PR = Protected ranking
- SR = Special ranking
- SE = Special exempt
- JE = Junior exempt
- JR = Junior Accelerator Programme entrant
- CO = College Accelerator Programme entrant
- NG = Next Gen Accelerator Program entrant
- w/o = Walkover
- r = Retired
- d = Defaulted

=== Finals ===
Semifinals
(Ukraine) Elina Svitolina	6	3	2
WC	(Japan) Naomi Osaka	1	6	6
(Denmark) Caroline Wozniacki	4	7	6
2	(Poland) Agnieszka Radwańska	6	5	4

Final
WC	(Japan) Naomi Osaka	5	3
(Denmark) Caroline Wozniacki	7	6

=== Top half ===
First round
Q	(Ukraine) K Bondarenko	6^{3}	3
(Latvia) A Sevastova	7^{7}	6
(Ukraine) E Svitolina	6	6
(United States) C Vandeweghe	3	4
(Germany) A Petkovic	4	0^{r}
8	(Russia) A Pavlyuchenkova	6	2
Q	(Belarus) A Sasnovich	3	6	6
(Belgium) Y Wickmayer	6	3	3
(Japan) M Doi	4	4
WC	(Japan) N Osaka	6	6
(Czech Republic) L Šafářová	6	1	5
6	(Slovakia) D Cibulková	4	6	7

Second round
1	(Spain) G Muguruza	6	6
(Latvia) A Sevastova	3	3
(Ukraine) E Svitolina	7^{7}	6
8	(Russia) A Pavlyuchenkova	6^{5}	4
3	(Czech Republic) Ka Plíšková	4	2
Q	(Belarus) A Sasnovich	6	6
WC	(Japan) N Osaka	6	6
6	(Slovakia) D Cibulková	2	1

Quarterfinals
1	(Spain) G Muguruza	2	6	3
(Ukraine) E Svitolina	6	4	6
Q	(Belarus) A Sasnovich	3	6^{6}
WC	(Japan) N Osaka	6	7^{8}

Semifinals
(Ukraine) E Svitolina	6	3	2
WC	(Japan) N Osaka	1	6	6

=== Bottom half ===
First round
5/WC	(United States) M Keys	3	6	6^{7}
(Kazakhstan) Y Putintseva	6	3	7^{9}
WC	(Russia) O Pervushina	6	2	3
Q	(Poland) M Linette	4	6	6
(Switzerland) B Bencic	2	7	1
(Denmark) C Wozniacki	6	5	6
7/WC	(Czech Republic) P Kvitová	6	6
(United States) M Brengle	3	3
(United States) V Lepchenko	0	3
(Puerto Rico) M Puig	6	6
(Czech Republic) B Strýcová	6	6
Q	(Thailand) V Wongteanchai	1	1

Second round
(Kazakhstan) Y Putintseva	6	3	5
Q	(Poland) M Linette	4	6	7
(Denmark) C Wozniacki	7^{7}	4	6
4	(Spain) C Suárez Navarro	6^{4}	6	4
7/WC	(Czech Republic) P Kvitová	6	4	4
(Puerto Rico) M Puig	1	6	6
(Czech Republic) B Strýcová	3	6	5
2	(Poland) A Radwańska	6	3	7

Quarterfinals
Q	(Poland) M Linette	4	3
(Denmark) C Wozniacki	6	6
(Puerto Rico) M Puig	2	3
2	(Poland) A Radwańska	6	6

Semifinals
(Denmark) C Wozniacki	4	7	6
2	(Poland) A Radwańska	6	5	4

== Qualifying ==
=== Seeds ===
1. (Ukraine) Kateryna Bondarenko (qualified)
2. (China) Wang Qiang (first round)
3. (Japan) Nao Hibino (qualifying competition)
4. (Japan) Kurumi Nara (withdrew due to a left lower back injury)
5. (Poland) Magda Linette (qualified)
6. (Belarus) Aliaksandra Sasnovich (qualified)
7. (Japan) Risa Ozaki (first round)
8. (Serbia) Aleksandra Krunić (qualifying competition)
9. (Japan) Hiroko Kuwata (first round)

=== Qualifiers ===
1. (Ukraine) Kateryna Bondarenko
2. (Thailand) Varatchaya Wongteanchai
3. (Poland) 'Magda Linette
4. (Belarus) Aliaksandra Sasnovich

=== Draw ===
==== First qualifier ====
First round
1	(Ukraine) Kateryna Bondarenko	6	6
(Slovenia) Andreja Klepač	1	1
(Israel) Julia Glushko	4	0
(China) Yang Zhaoxuan	6	6
WC	(Japan) Yuki Naito	1	2
(Slovakia) Daniela Hantuchová	6	6
(Japan) Erika Sema	1	2
8	(Serbia) Aleksandra Krunić	6	6

Second round
1	(Ukraine) Kateryna Bondarenko	6	6
(China) Yang Zhaoxuan	2	4
(Slovakia) Daniela Hantuchová	3	1
8	(Serbia) Aleksandra Krunić	6	6

Qualifying competition
1	(Ukraine) Kateryna Bondarenko	6	6
8	(Serbia) Aleksandra Krunić	0	2

==== Second qualifier ====
First round
2	(China) Wang Qiang	6^{4}	6	4
(Thailand) Varatchaya Wongteanchai	7^{7}	2	6
(Germany) Antonia Lottner	2	1
(Ukraine) Olga Savchuk	6	6
(Poland) Alicja Rosolska	6	4	6
WC	(Japan) Chihiro Muramatsu	4	6	3
(Japan) Shuko Aoyama	7	6
7	(Japan) Risa Ozaki	5	2

Second round
(Thailand) Varatchaya Wongteanchai	6	6
(Ukraine) Olga Savchuk	4	3
(Poland) Alicja Rosolska	1	2
(Japan) Shuko Aoyama	6	6

Qualifying competition
(Thailand) Varatchaya Wongteanchai	6	6
(Japan) Shuko Aoyama	2	0

==== Third qualifier ====
First round
3	(Japan) Nao Hibino	6	6
(China) Xu Yifan	3	4
(Chinese Taipei) Lee Ya-hsuan	6	6
WC	(Japan) Ayumi Miyamoto	0	3
WC	(Japan) Makoto Ninomiya	0	7^{9}	6
(Japan) Miharu Imanishi	6	6^{7}	2
WC	(United States) Yuki Chiang	0	5
5	(Poland) Magda Linette	6	7

Second round
3	(Japan) Nao Hibino	6^{2}	6	6
(Chinese Taipei) Lee Ya-hsuan	7^{7}	3	4
WC	(Japan) Makoto Ninomiya	4	0
5	(Poland) Magda Linette	6	6

Qualifying competition
3	(Japan) Nao Hibino	2	4
5	(Poland) Magda Linette	6	6

==== Fourth qualifier ====
First round
9	(Japan) Hiroko Kuwata	1	7	4
(Japan) Miyu Kato	6	5	6
WC	(Japan) Mai Hontama	7	6
(United States) Abigail Spears	5	3
(Australia) Jessica Moore	0	2
(Australia) Arina Rodionova	6	6
(Canada) Gabriela Dabrowski	3	1
6	(Belarus) Aliaksandra Sasnovich	6	6

Second round
(Japan) Miyu Kato	6	6
WC	(Japan) Mai Hontama	2	1
(Australia) Arina Rodionova	2	3
6	(Belarus) Aliaksandra Sasnovich	6	6

Qualifying competition
(Japan) Miyu Kato	1	4
6	(Belarus) Aliaksandra Sasnovich	6	6
