= 2016 Toray Pan Pacific Open =

- Date: 19–25 September
- Edition: 33rd
- Category: WTA Premier
- Draw: 28S / 16D
- Prize money: $1,000,000
- Surface: Hard / outdoor
- Location: Tokyo, Japan
- Venue: Ariake Forest Park

Champions

Singles
- (Denmark) Caroline Wozniacki

Doubles
- (India) Sania Mirza / (Czech Republic) Barbora Strýcová
- Pan Pacific Open

The 2016 Toray Pan Pacific Open was a women's tennis tournament played on outdoor hard courts. It was the 33rd edition of the Pan Pacific Open, and part of the Premier Series of the 2016 WTA Tour. It took place at the Ariake Coliseum in Tokyo, Japan, on 19–25 September 2016. Caroline Wozniacki won the singles title.

== Points and prize money ==
=== Point distribution ===
Event	W	F	SF	QF	Round of 16	Round of 32	Q	Q3	Q2	Q1
Singles	470	305	185	100	55	1	25	18	13	1
Doubles	470	305	185	100	1	—N/a	—N/a	—N/a	—N/a	—N/a

=== Prize money ===
Event	W	F	SF	QF	Round of 16	Round of 32^{*}	Q3	Q2	Q1
Singles	$193,850	$103,504	$55,287	$22,518	$12,077	$7,662	$3,442	$1,830	$1,018
Doubles	$45,940	$24,548	$13,414	$6,822	$3,705	—N/a	—N/a	—N/a	—N/a
Doubles prize money per team

^* Qualifiers prize money is also the round of 32 prize money

== Singles main-draw entrants ==
=== Seeds ===
Country	Player	Ranking	Seeds
ESP	Garbiñe Muguruza	3	1
POL	Agnieszka Radwańska	4	2
CZE	Karolína Plíšková	6	3
ESP	Carla Suárez Navarro	8	4
USA	Madison Keys	9	5
SVK	Dominika Cibulková	12	6
CZE	Petra Kvitová	16	7
RUS	Anastasia Pavlyuchenkova	17	8

- Rankings are as of September 12, 2016

=== Other entrants ===
The following players received wild cards into the main singles draw:

- (United States) Madison Keys
- (Czech Republic) Petra Kvitová
- (Japan) Naomi Osaka
- (Russia) Olesya Pervushina

The following players received entry from the singles qualifying draw:

- (Ukraine) Kateryna Bondarenko
- (Poland) Magda Linette
- (Belarus) Aliaksandra Sasnovich
- (Thailand) Varatchaya Wongteanchai

=== Withdrawals ===
Before the tournament

- (Romania) Simona Halep → replaced by (Denmark) Caroline Wozniacki
- (Australia) Samantha Stosur → replaced by (United States) Madison Brengle
- (United States) Sloane Stephens → replaced by (Latvia) Anastasija Sevastova
- (Australia) Daria Gavrilova → replaced by (United States) Varvara Lepchenko

== Doubles main-draw entrants ==
=== Seeds ===
Country	Player	Country	Player	Rank^{1}	Seed
TPE	Chan Hao-ching	TPE	Chan Yung-jan	14	1
IND	Sania Mirza	CZE	Barbora Strýcová	19	2
USA	Raquel Atawo	USA	Abigail Spears	40	3
SLO	Andreja Klepač	SLO	Katarina Srebotnik	56	4

- Rankings are as of September 12, 2016

=== Other entrants ===
The following pairs received entry as alternates:

- (United States) Madison Brengle / (Japan) Kanae Hisami
- (Chinese Taipei) Lee Ya-hsuan / (Japan) Kotomi Takahata

=== Withdrawals ===
Before the tournament

- (Germany) Andrea Petkovic (lower back injury)
- (Czech Republic) Lucie Šafářová (right abdominal injury)

== Finals ==
=== Singles ===
- (Denmark) Caroline Wozniacki def. (Japan) Naomi Osaka, 7–5, 6–3

=== Doubles ===
- (India) Sania Mirza / (Czech Republic) Barbora Strýcová def. (China) Liang Chen / (China) Yang Zhaoxuan, 6–1, 6–1
