= 2018 Toray Pan Pacific Open – Doubles =

Doubles
- 2018 Toray Pan Pacific Open

Final
- Champions: (Japan) Miyu Kato (Japan) Makoto Ninomiya
- Runners-up: (Czech Republic) Andrea Sestini Hlaváčková (Czech Republic) Barbora Strýcová
- Score: 6–4, 6–4

Events
Singles	Doubles
← 2017 ·	Toray Pan Pacific Open	· 2019 →

Andreja Klepač and María José Martínez Sánchez were the defending champions, but chose not to participate.

Miyu Kato and Makoto Ninomiya won the title, defeating Andrea Sestini Hlaváčková and Barbora Strýcová in the final, 6–4, 6–4.

== Seeds ==
1. (Czech Republic) Andrea Sestini Hlaváčková / (Czech Republic) Barbora Strýcová (final)
2. (Canada) Gabriela Dabrowski / (China) Xu Yifan (semifinals)
3. (Chinese Taipei) Chan Hao-ching / (China) Yang Zhaoxuan (first round)
4. (United States) Raquel Atawo / (Germany) Anna-Lena Grönefeld (semifinals)

== Draw ==
=== Key ===
- Q = Qualifier
- WC = Wild card
- LL = Lucky loser
- Alt = Alternate
- SE = Special exempt
- PR = Protected ranking
- ITF = ITF entry
- JE = Junior exempt
- w/o = Walkover
- r = Retired
- d = Defaulted
- SR = Special ranking

=== Draw ===
First round
1	(Czech Republic) A Sestini Hlaváčková (Czech Republic) B Strýcová	6	6
WC	(Japan) E Hayashi (Japan) M Uchijima	4	0
(Japan) M Imanishi (Germany) A Zaja	7^{7}	3	[13]
(Ukraine) N Kichenok (Australia) An Rodionova	6^{2}	6	[11]
4	(United States) R Atawo (Germany) A-L Grönefeld	6	3	[10]
(Japan) N Hibino (Georgia (country)) O Kalashnikova	1	6	[3]
(Japan) K Nara (Japan) R Ozaki	1	4
(Switzerland) B Bencic (Russia) A Pavlyuchenkova	6	6
(Japan) M Kobori (Japan) A Shimizu	4	3
(Japan) M Kato (Japan) M Ninomiya	6	6
(Ukraine) L Kichenok (Slovenia) K Srebotnik	6	6
3	(Chinese Taipei) H-c Chan (China) Z Yang	3	4
(Poland) A Rosolska (United States) A Spears	6	6
(Japan) M Inoue (Japan) C Muramatsu	3	3
(Japan) S Aoyama (China) Y Duan	3	2
2	(Canada) G Dabrowski (China) Y Xu	6	6

Quarterfinals
1	(Czech Republic) A Sestini Hlaváčková (Czech Republic) B Strýcová	6	6
(Japan) M Imanishi (Germany) A Zaja	4	2
4	(United States) R Atawo (Germany) A-L Grönefeld	5	6	[10]
(Switzerland) B Bencic (Russia) A Pavlyuchenkova	7	4	[6]
(Japan) M Kato (Japan) M Ninomiya	6	2	[10]
(Ukraine) L Kichenok (Slovenia) K Srebotnik	4	6	[7]
(Poland) A Rosolska (United States) A Spears	1	4
2	(Canada) G Dabrowski (China) Y Xu	6	6

Semifinals
1	(Czech Republic) A Sestini Hlaváčková (Czech Republic) B Strýcová	6	7
4	(United States) R Atawo (Germany) A-L Grönefeld	3	5
(Japan) M Kato (Japan) M Ninomiya	7^{10}	6
2	(Canada) G Dabrowski (China) Y Xu	6^{8}	0

Final
1	(Czech Republic) A Sestini Hlaváčková (Czech Republic) B Strýcová	4	4
(Japan) M Kato (Japan) M Ninomiya	6	6
