= 2016 Toray Pan Pacific Open – Doubles =

Doubles
- 2016 Toray Pan Pacific Open

Final
- Champions: (India) Sania Mirza (Czech Republic) Barbora Strýcová
- Runners-up: (China) Liang Chen (China) Yang Zhaoxuan
- Score: 6–1, 6–1

Details
- Draw: 16
- Seeds: 4

Events
Singles	Doubles
← 2015 ·	Toray Pan Pacific Open	· 2017 →

Garbiñe Muguruza and Carla Suárez Navarro were the defending champions, but they chose not to participate this year.

Sania Mirza and Barbora Strýcová won the title, defeating Liang Chen and Yang Zhaoxuan in the final, 6–1, 6–1.

== Seeds ==
1. (Chinese Taipei) Chan Hao-ching / (Chinese Taipei) Chan Yung-jan (first round)
2. (India) Sania Mirza / (Czech Republic) Barbora Strýcová (champions)
3. (United States) Raquel Atawo / (United States) Abigail Spears (semifinals)
4. (Slovenia) Andreja Klepač / (Slovenia) Katarina Srebotnik (first round)

== Draw ==
=== Key ===
- Q = Qualifier
- WC = Wild card
- LL = Lucky loser
- Alt = Alternate
- SE = Special exempt
- PR = Protected ranking
- ITF = ITF entry
- JE = Junior exempt
- w/o = Walkover
- r = Retired
- d = Defaulted
- SR = Special ranking

First round
1	(Chinese Taipei) H-c Chan (Chinese Taipei) Y-j Chan	6	4	[5]
(China) C Liang (China) Z Yang	1	6	[10]
(United States) N Melichar (Thailand) V Wongteanchai	2	6	[6]
(Australia) Ar Rodionova (Ukraine) O Savchuk	6	4	[10]
3	(United States) R Atawo (United States) A Spears	7^{7}	5	[10]
(Ukraine) K Bondarenko (Chinese Taipei) C-j Chuang	6^{5}	7	[5]
Alt	(United States) M Brengle (Japan) K Hisami	2	2
(Serbia) A Krunić (Australia) J Moore	6	6
(Japan) N Hibino (Poland) A Rosolska	6^{2}	6	[8]
(Japan) S Aoyama (Japan) M Ninomiya	7^{7}	2	[10]
(Canada) G Dabrowski (Spain) MJ Martínez Sánchez	6	6
4	(Slovenia) A Klepač (Slovenia) K Srebotnik	4	4
(Japan) M Kato (China) Y Xu	6	6
Alt	(Chinese Taipei) Y-h Lee (Japan) K Takahata	4	0
(Japan) M Doi (Japan) K Nara	7^{7}	5	[8]
2	(India) S Mirza (Czech Republic) B Strýcová	6^{3}	7	[10]

Quarterfinals
(China) C Liang (China) Z Yang	6	1	[10]
(Australia) Ar Rodionova (Ukraine) O Savchuk	1	6	[1]
3	(United States) R Atawo (United States) A Spears	6	7^{7}
(Serbia) A Krunić (Australia) J Moore	2	6^{5}
(Japan) S Aoyama (Japan) M Ninomiya	6^{5}	6^{6}
(Canada) G Dabrowski (Spain) MJ Martínez Sánchez	7^{7}	7^{8}
(Japan) M Kato (China) Y Xu	2	2
2	(India) S Mirza (Czech Republic) B Strýcová	6	6

Semifinals
(China) C Liang (China) Z Yang	4	6	[10]
3	(United States) R Atawo (United States) A Spears	6	2	[5]
(Canada) G Dabrowski (Spain) MJ Martínez Sánchez	6	3	[5]
2	(India) S Mirza (Czech Republic) B Strýcová	4	6	[10]

Final
(China) C Liang (China) Z Yang	1	1
2	(India) S Mirza (Czech Republic) B Strýcová	6	6
