= Arena Tachikawa Tachihi =

Arena in Tachikawa, Tokyo, Japan

Coordinates: 35°42′55.6″N 139°24′59.1″E

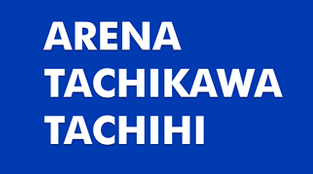

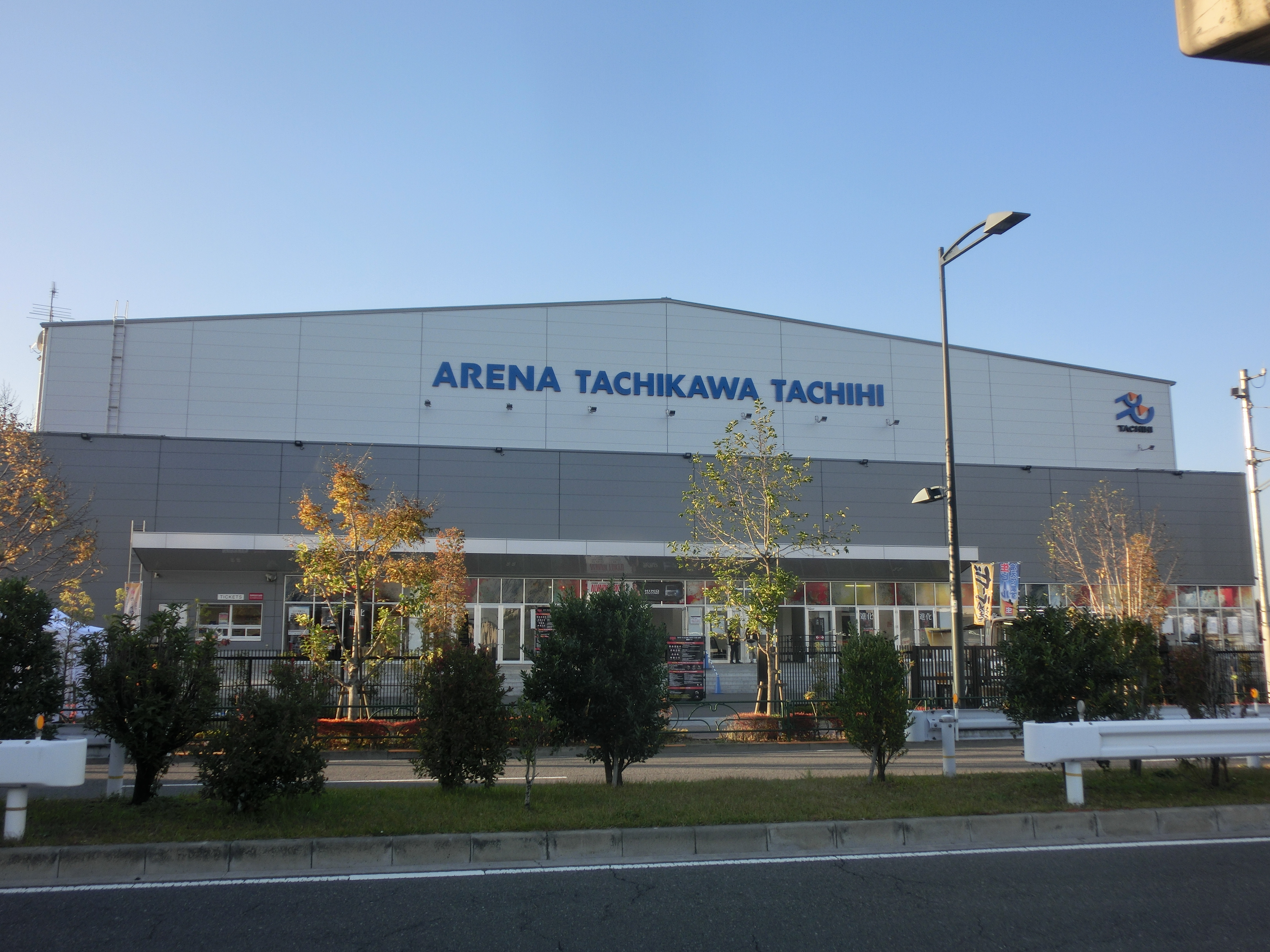

- Location within Tokyo Location within Japan
- Interactive map of Arena Tachikawa Tachihi
- Full name: Arena Tachikawa Tachihi
- Location: Tachikawa, Tokyo, Japan
- Owner: Tachihi Holdings Co., Ltd.
- Operator: Tama Sports Club
- Capacity: 3,000
- Scoreboard: Centerhung scoreboard
- Public transit: Tama Toshi Monorail Line Tachihi Station

Construction
- Opened: October, 2017
- Cost: JPY 1.5billion

Tenants
- Alvark Tokyo; Fuchu Athletic FC

Website
- https://www.arenatachikawatachihi.com/

Arena Tachikawa Tachihi is an arena in Tachikawa, Tokyo, Japan. It is the home arena of the Alvark Tokyo of the B.League, Japan's professional basketball league.

In September 2018, the venue hosted the Toray Pan Pacific Open as the Ariake Coliseum was being renovated for the tennis events at the 2020 Summer Olympics.

== Facilities ==
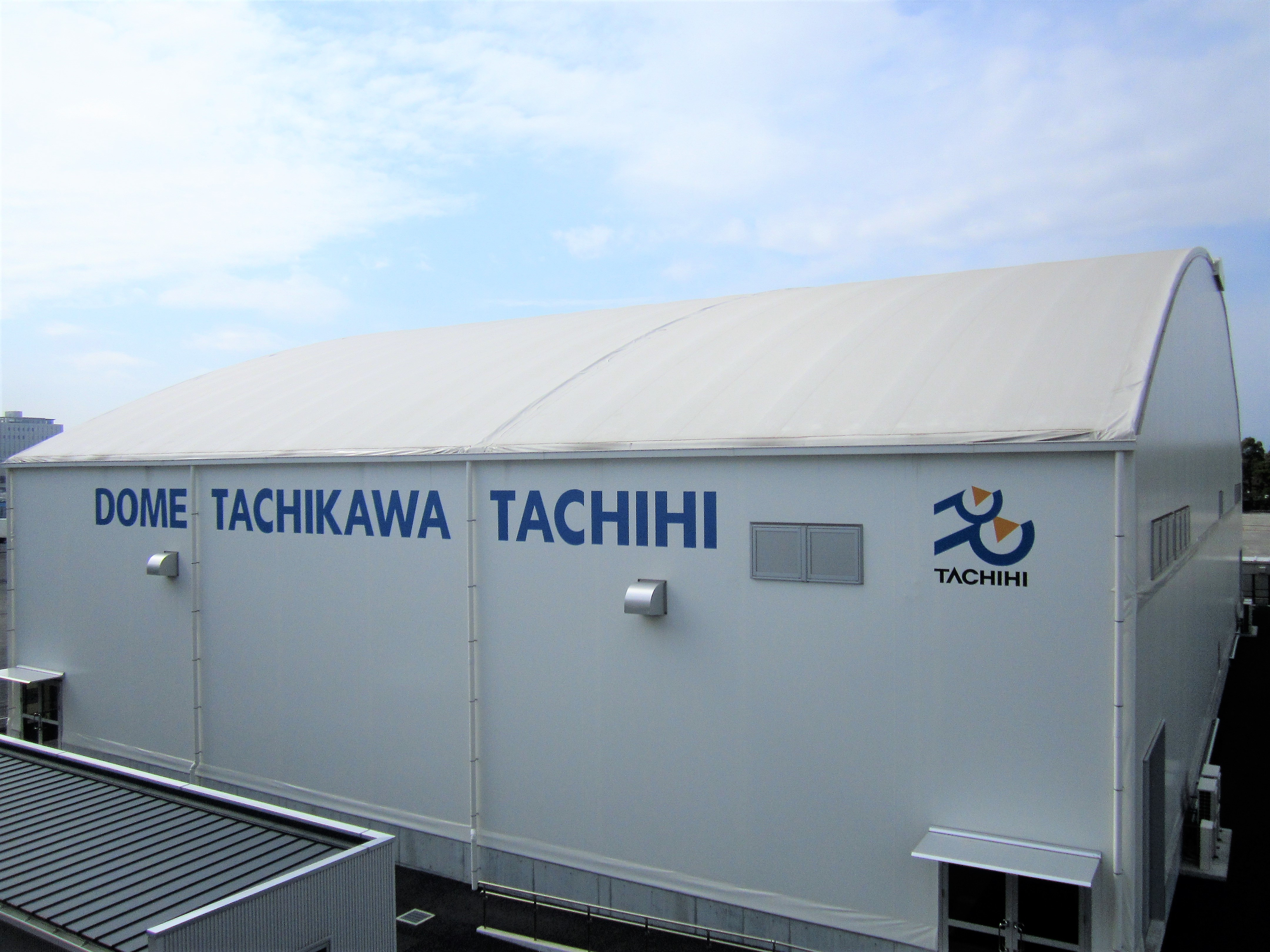
Dome Tachikawa Tachihi

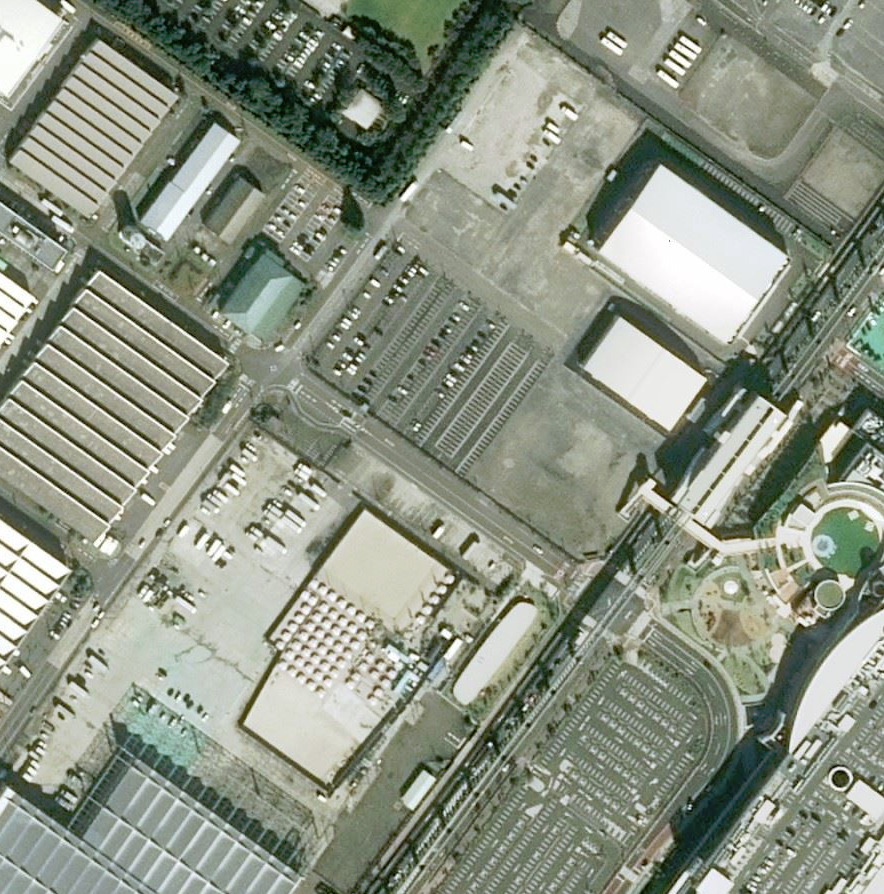
Satellite view

- Main Arena
- Dome Tachikawa Tachihi
- Tachihi Beach
