= Pan Pacific Open =

Toray Pan Pacific Open
- 2026 Toray Pan Pacific Open
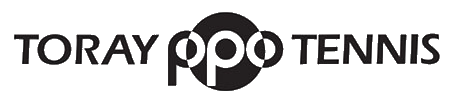

WTA Tour
- Founded: 1973; 53 years ago
- Editions: 52 (2026)
- Location: Tokyo (1973–2018; 2022–present); Osaka (2019); Japan
- Venue: Tokyo Metropolitan Gymnasium (1984–2007); Ariake Coliseum (2008–17, 2022–present); Arena Tachikawa Tachihi (2018); Utsubo Tennis Center (2019)
- Category: Tier II (1990-1992); Tier I (1993-2008); Premier 5 (2009-2013); Premier (2014-2019); WTA 500 (2022-present)
- Surface: Carpet / indoor (1984–2007); Hard / outdoor (2008–17, 2019–); Hard / indoor (2018)
- Draw: 28M / 24Q / 16D
- Prize money: $1,206,446 (206)
- Website: toray-ppo.com

Current champions (2026)
- Singles: Diana Shnaider
- Doubles: (Italy) Sara Errani (Italy) Jasmine Paolini

The Toray Pan Pacific Open (Japanese: パン・パシフィックオープン), sponsored by Toray Industries, is a WTA 500-level outdoor hardcourt tennis tournament held annually in Japan. Since 1973, the tournament has taken place in Tokyo except once (2019), when it was held in Osaka. It is a WTA 500 event since 2022.

== History ==
The tournament was first held in 1973 as the Toray Sillook Championships. In 1976, the name was changed to the Sillook Open in Tokyo. In 1982 it was renamed the TV Open and in 1983, it changed yet again to the Queens Grand Prix. Its current name, the Pan Pacific Open, was designated in 1984 and had traditionally been played on indoor carpet at the Tokyo Metropolitan Gymnasium. In 2008, the event moved to outdoor hardcourts at the Ariake Tennis Park.

It was classified as a Tier I tournament from 1993 through 2008. Then, it became a Premier 5 tournament in 2009 until it was downgraded to a Premier event from the 2014 edition onwards, with the Wuhan Open in Wuhan, China acting as its replacement in the Premier category. Martina Hingis holds the record for most singles titles with five.

== Past finals ==
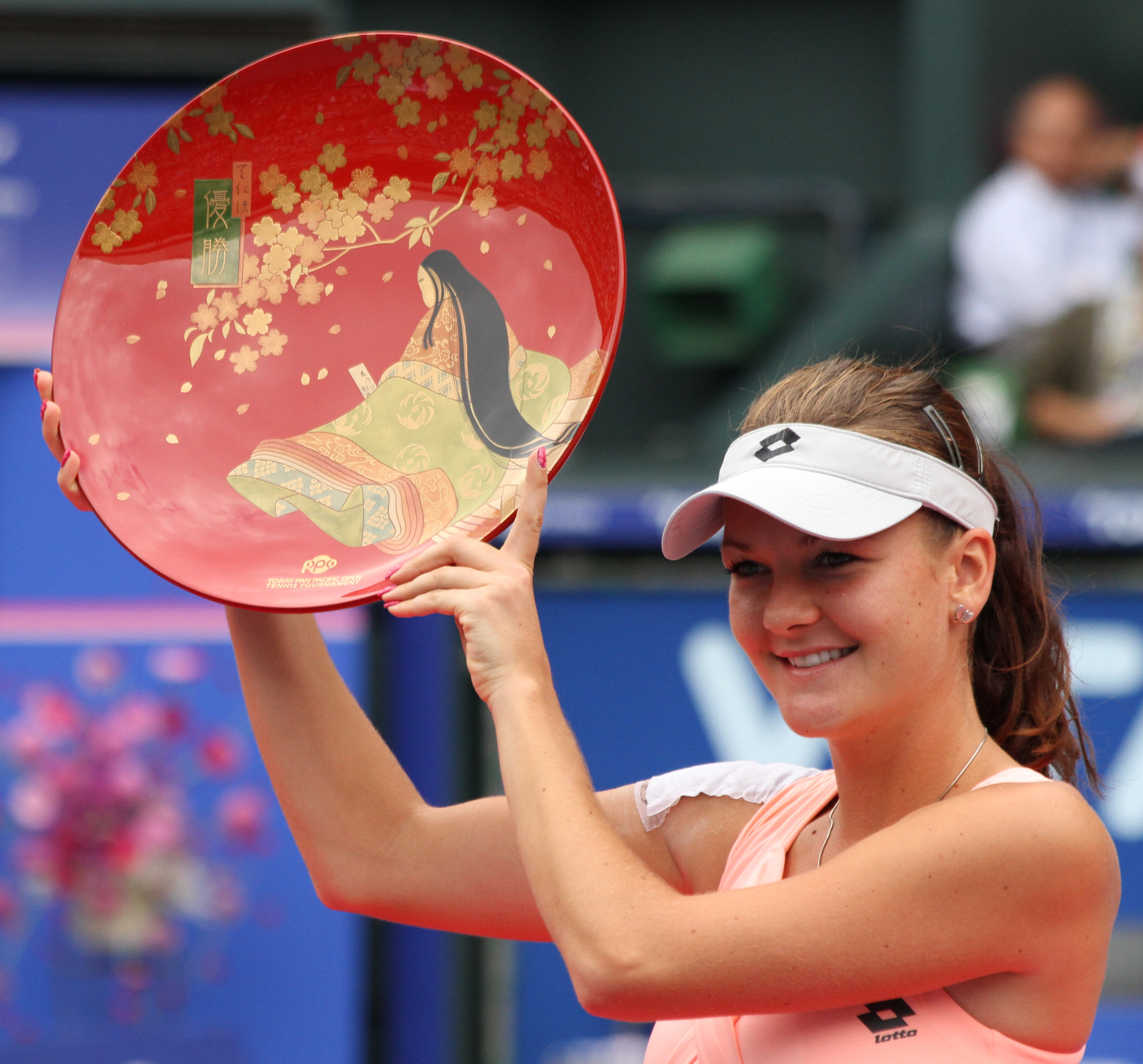
Agnieszka Radwańska, winner of the 2011 singles

=== Singles ===
Year	Champion	Runner-up	Score
1973	(United States) Billie Jean King	(United States) Nancy Richey Gunter	7–6, 5–7, 6–3
1974	(Japan) Kazuko Sawamatsu	(United States) Wendy Overton	6–4, 7–5
1975	(Australia) Margaret Court	(Australia) Evonne Goolagong Cawley	6–7, 6–1, 7–6
1976	(Netherlands) Betty Stöve	(Australia) Margaret Court	1–6, 6–4, 6–3
1977	(United Kingdom) Virginia Wade	(United States) Martina Navratilova	7–5, 5–7, 6–4
1978	(United Kingdom) Virginia Wade (2)	(Netherlands) Betty Stöve	6–4, 7–6
1979	(United States) Billie Jean King (2)	(Australia) Evonne Goolagong Cawley	6–4, 7–5
1980	(United States) Billie Jean King (3)	(United States) Terry Holladay	7–5, 6–4
1981	(United States) Ann Kiyomura	(West Germany) Bettina Bunge	6–4, 7–5
1982	(West Germany) Bettina Bunge	(United States) Barbara Potter	7–6, 6–2
1983	(United States) Lisa Bonder	(United States) Andrea Jaeger	6–2, 5–7, 6–1
1984	(Bulgaria) Manuela Maleeva	(West Germany) Claudia Kohde-Kilsch	3–6, 6–4, 6–4
1985	(Bulgaria) Manuela Maleeva (2)	(United States) Bonnie Gadusek	7–6^{(7–2)}, 3–6, 7–5
1986	(West Germany) Steffi Graf	(Bulgaria) Manuela Maleeva	6–4, 6–2
1987	(Argentina) Gabriela Sabatini	(Bulgaria) Manuela Maleeva	6–4, 7–6^{(8–6)}
1988	(United States) Pam Shriver	(Czechoslovakia) Helena Suková	7–5 6–1
1989	(United States) Martina Navratilova	(United States) Lori McNeil	6–7^{(3–7)}, 6–3, 7–6^{(7–5)}
↓ Tier II tournament ↓
1990	(West Germany) Steffi Graf (2)	(Spain) Arantxa Sánchez Vicario	6–1, 6–2
1991	(Argentina) Gabriela Sabatini (2)	(United States) Martina Navratilova	2–6, 6–2, 6–4
1992	(Argentina) Gabriela Sabatini (3)	(United States) Martina Navratilova	6–2, 4–6, 6–2
↓ Tier I tournament ↓
1993	(United States) Martina Navratilova (2)	(Latvia) Larisa Savchenko-Neiland	6–2, 6–2
1994	(Germany) Steffi Graf (3)	(United States) Martina Navratilova	6–2, 6–4
1995	(Japan) Kimiko Date	(United States) Lindsay Davenport	6–1, 6–2
1996	(Croatia) Iva Majoli	(Spain) Arantxa Sánchez Vicario	6–4, 6–1
1997	(Switzerland) Martina Hingis	(Germany) Steffi Graf	w/o
1998	(United States) Lindsay Davenport	(Switzerland) Martina Hingis	6–3, 6–3
1999	(Switzerland) Martina Hingis (2)	(South Africa) Amanda Coetzer	6–2, 6–1
2000	(Switzerland) Martina Hingis (3)	(France) Sandrine Testud	6–3, 7–5
2001	(United States) Lindsay Davenport (2)	(Switzerland) Martina Hingis	6–7^{(4–7)}, 6–4, 6–2
2002	(Switzerland) Martina Hingis (4)	(United States) Monica Seles	7–6^{(8–6)}, 4–6, 6–3
2003	(United States) Lindsay Davenport (3)	(United States) Monica Seles	6–7^{(6–8)}, 6–1, 6–2
2004	(United States) Lindsay Davenport (4)	(Bulgaria) Magdalena Maleeva	6–4, 6–1
2005	(Russia) Maria Sharapova	(United States) Lindsay Davenport	6–1, 3–6, 7–6^{(7–5)}
2006	(Russia) Elena Dementieva	(Switzerland) Martina Hingis	6–2, 6–0
2007	(Switzerland) Martina Hingis (5)	(Serbia) Ana Ivanovic	6–4, 6–2
2008	(Russia) Dinara Safina	(Russia) Svetlana Kuznetsova	6–1, 6–3
↓ Premier 5 tournament ↓
2009	(Russia) Maria Sharapova (2)	(Serbia) Jelena Janković	5–2 ret.
2010	(Denmark) Caroline Wozniacki	(Russia) Elena Dementieva	1–6, 6–2, 6–3
2011	(Poland) Agnieszka Radwańska	(Russia) Vera Zvonareva	6–3, 6–2
2012	(Russia) Nadia Petrova	(Poland) Agnieszka Radwańska	6–0, 1–6, 6–3
2013	(Czech Republic) Petra Kvitová	(Germany) Angelique Kerber	6–2, 0–6, 6–3
↓ Premier tournament ↓
2014	(Serbia) Ana Ivanovic	(Denmark) Caroline Wozniacki	6–2, 7–6^{(7–2)}
2015	(Poland) Agnieszka Radwańska (2)	(Switzerland) Belinda Bencic	6–2, 6–2
2016	(Denmark) Caroline Wozniacki (2)	(Japan) Naomi Osaka	7–5, 6–3
2017	(Denmark) Caroline Wozniacki (3)	(Russia) Anastasia Pavlyuchenkova	6–0, 7–5
2018	(Czech Republic) Karolína Plíšková	(Japan) Naomi Osaka	6–4, 6–4
2019	(Japan) Naomi Osaka	(Russia) Anastasia Pavlyuchenkova	6–2, 6–3
2020—2021	No competition (due to COVID-19 pandemic)		
↓ WTA 500 ↓
2022	Liudmila Samsonova	(China) Zheng Qinwen	7–5, 7–5
2023	Veronika Kudermetova	(United States) Jessica Pegula	7–5, 6–1
2024	(China) Zheng Qinwen	(United States) Sofia Kenin	7–6^{(7-5)}, 6–3
2025	(Switzerland) Belinda Bencic	(Czech Republic) Linda Nosková	6–2, 6–3
2026	Diana Shnaider	(Canada) Leylah Fernandez	6–4, 5–7, 6–2

=== Doubles ===
Year	Champions	Runners-up	Score
1984	(West Germany) Claudia Kohde-Kilsch (Czechoslovakia) Helena Suková	(Australia) Elizabeth Sayers-Smylie (France) Catherine Tanvier	6–4, 6–4
1985	(West Germany) Claudia Kohde-Kilsch (2) (Czechoslovakia) Helena Suková (2)	(Netherlands) Marcella Mesker (Australia) Elizabeth Sayers-Smylie	6–0, 6–4
1986	(West Germany) Bettina Bunge (West Germany) Steffi Graf	(Bulgaria) Katerina Maleeva (Bulgaria) Manuela Maleeva	6–1, 6–7^{(4–7)}, 6–2
1987	(United States) Anne White (United States) Robin White	(Bulgaria) Katerina Maleeva (Bulgaria) Manuela Maleeva-Fragnière	6–1, 6–2
1988	(United States) Pam Shriver (Czechoslovakia) Helena Suková (3)	(United States) Gigi Fernández (United States) Robin White	4–6, 6–2, 7–6^{(7–5)}
1989	(United States) Katrina Adams (United States) Zina Garrison	(United States) Mary Joe Fernández (West Germany) Claudia Kohde-Kilsch	6–3, 3–6, 7–6^{(7–5)}
↓ Tier II tournament ↓
1990	(United States) Gigi Fernández (Australia) Elizabeth Sayers-Smylie	(Australia) Jo-Anne Faull (Australia) Rachel McQuillan	6–2, 6–2
1991	(United States) Kathy Jordan (Australia) Elizabeth Sayers-Smylie (2)	(United States) Mary Joe Fernández (United States) Robin White	4–6, 6–0, 6–3
1992	(Spain) Arantxa Sánchez (Czechoslovakia) Helena Suková (4)	(United States) Martina Navratilova (United States) Pam Shriver	7–5, 6–1
↓ Tier I tournament ↓
1993	(United States) Martina Navratilova (Czech Republic) Helena Suková (5)	(United States) Lori McNeil (Australia) Rennae Stubbs	6–4, 6–3
1994	(Australia) Elizabeth Sayers-Smylie (3) (United States) Pam Shriver	(Netherlands) Manon Bollegraf (United States) Martina Navratilova	6–3, 3–6, 7–6^{(7–3)}
1995	(United States) Gigi Fernández (2) (Belarus) Natasha Zvereva	(United States) Lindsay Davenport (Australia) Rennae Stubbs	6–0, 6–3
1996	(United States) Gigi Fernández (3) (Belarus) Natasha Zvereva (2)	(South Africa) Mariaan de Swardt (Romania) Irina Spîrlea	7–6^{(9–7)}, 6–3
1997	(United States) Lindsay Davenport (Belarus) Natasha Zvereva (3)	(United States) Gigi Fernández (Switzerland) Martina Hingis	6–4, 6–3
1998	(Switzerland) Martina Hingis (Croatia) Mirjana Lučić-Baroni	(United States) Lindsay Davenport (Belarus) Natasha Zvereva	7–5, 6–4
1999	(United States) Lindsay Davenport (2) (Belarus) Natasha Zvereva (4)	(Switzerland) Martina Hingis (Czech Republic) Jana Novotná	6–2, 6–3
2000	(Switzerland) Martina Hingis (2) (France) Mary Pierce	(France) Alexandra Fusai (France) Nathalie Tauziat	6–4, 6–1
2001	(United States) Lisa Raymond (Australia) Rennae Stubbs	(Russia) Anna Kournikova (Uzbekistan) Iroda Tulyaganova	7–6^{(7–5)}, 2–6, 7–6^{(8–6)}
2002	(United States) Lisa Raymond (2) (Australia) Rennae Stubbs (2)	(Belgium) Els Callens (Italy) Roberta Vinci	6–1, 6–1
2003	(Russia) Elena Bovina (Australia) Rennae Stubbs (3)	(United States) Lindsay Davenport (United States) Lisa Raymond	6–3, 6–4
2004	(Zimbabwe) Cara Black (Australia) Rennae Stubbs (4)	(Russia) Elena Likhovtseva (Bulgaria) Magdalena Maleeva	6–0, 6–1
2005	(Slovakia) Janette Husárová (Russia) Elena Likhovtseva	(United States) Lindsay Davenport (United States) Corina Morariu	6–4, 6–3
2006	(United States) Lisa Raymond (3) (Australia) Samantha Stosur	(Zimbabwe) Cara Black (Australia) Rennae Stubbs	6–2, 6–1
2007	(United States) Lisa Raymond (4) (Australia) Samantha Stosur (2)	(United States) Vania King (Australia) Rennae Stubbs	7–6^{(8–6)}, 3–6, 7–5
2008	(United States) Vania King (Russia) Nadia Petrova	(United States) Lisa Raymond (Australia) Samantha Stosur	6–1, 6–4
↓ Premier 5 tournament ↓
2009	(Russia) Alisa Kleybanova (Italy) Francesca Schiavone	(Slovakia) Daniela Hantuchová (Japan) Ai Sugiyama	6–4, 6–2
2010	(Czech Republic) Iveta Benešová (Czech Republic) Barbora Strýcová	(Israel) Shahar Pe'er (China) Peng Shuai	6–4, 4–6, [10–8]
2011	(United States) Liezel Huber (United States) Lisa Raymond (5)	(Argentina) Gisela Dulko (Italy) Flavia Pennetta	7–6^{(7–4)}, 0–6, [10–6]
2012	(United States) Raquel Kops-Jones (United States) Abigail Spears	(Germany) Anna-Lena Grönefeld (Czech Republic) Květa Peschke	6–1, 6–4
2013	(Zimbabwe) Cara Black (2) (India) Sania Mirza	(Chinese Taipei) Chan Hao-Ching (United States) Liezel Huber	4–6, 6–0, [11–9]
↓ Premier tournament ↓
2014	(Zimbabwe) Cara Black (3) (India) Sania Mirza (2)	(Spain) Garbiñe Muguruza (Spain) Carla Suárez Navarro	6–2, 7–5
2015	(Spain) Garbiñe Muguruza (Spain) Carla Suárez Navarro	(Chinese Taipei) Chan Hao-ching (Chinese Taipei) Latisha Chan	7–5, 6–1
2016	(India) Sania Mirza (3) (Czech Republic) Barbora Strýcová (2)	(China) Liang Chen (China) Yang Zhaoxuan	6–1, 6–1
2017	(Slovenia) Andreja Klepač (Spain) María José Martínez Sánchez	(Australia) Daria Gavrilova (Russia) Daria Kasatkina	6–3, 6–2
2018	(Japan) Miyu Kato (Japan) Makoto Ninomiya	(Czech Republic) Andrea Sestini Hlaváčková (Czech Republic) Barbora Strýcová	6–4, 6–4
2019	(Chinese Taipei) Chan Hao-ching (Chinese Taipei) Latisha Chan	(Chinese Taipei) Hsieh Su-wei (Chinese Taipei) Hsieh Yu-chieh	7–5, 7–5
2020—2021	no competition (due to COVID-19 pandemic)		
↓ WTA 500 ↓
2022	(Canada) Gabriela Dabrowski (Mexico) Giuliana Olmos	(United States) Nicole Melichar-Martinez (Australia) Ellen Perez	6–4, 6–4
2023	(Norway) Ulrikke Eikeri (Estonia) Ingrid Neel	(Japan) Eri Hozumi (Japan) Makoto Ninomiya	3–6, 7–5, [10–5]
2024	(Japan) Shuko Aoyama (Japan) Eri Hozumi	(Japan) Ena Shibahara (Germany) Laura Siegemund	6–4, 7–6^{(7–3)}
2025	(Hungary) Tímea Babos (Brazil) Luisa Stefani	(Kazakhstan) Anna Danilina (Serbia) Aleksandra Krunić	6–1, 6–4
2026	(Italy) Sara Errani (Italy) Jasmine Paolini	(Canada) Gabriela Dabrowski (Brazil) Luisa Stefani	6–2, 6–2

== See also ==
- Japan Open
- Japan Women's Open
