= Mari Osaka =

Japanese tennis player (born 1996)

Mari Osaka 大坂 まり
- Country (sports): Japan
- Residence: Florida
- Born: April 3, 1996 (age 30) Osaka, Japan
- Retired: March 9, 2021
- Plays: Right-handed (two-handed backhand)
- Prize money: $90,891

Singles
- Career record: 196–162
- Career titles: 0
- Highest ranking: No. 280 (May 28, 2018)

Doubles
- Career record: 4–16
- Career titles: 0
- Highest ranking: No. 907 (April 17, 2017)

Mari Osaka (大坂 まり, Ōsaka Mari; born April 3, 1996) is a Japanese fashion designer, and former tennis player.

In her career, she reached four ITF finals. She is the older sister of Naomi Osaka, with whom she has collaborated on several fashion design and art projects.

== Biography ==
Osaka was born in Japan to a Japanese mother and a Haitian father; shortly thereafter, the family moved to Elmont, New York. She grew up in Fort Lauderdale.

Osaka made her WTA Tour debut at the 2014 Bank of the West Classic, in the doubles event partnering with Marina Shamayko, losing in the first round to the pair Varvara Lepchenko and Ajla Tomljanović.

She made her WTA Tour singles debut at the 2019 Miami Open, having received a wildcard into the main draw, but lost to Whitney Osuigwe. Osaka announced retirement from professional tennis in early 2021.

Since retirement, she has focused on her art and fashion design, including co-designing her sister Naomi's Met Gala look in fall 2021. Osaka's previous artistic work includes creating custom-designed COVID masks for UNICEF and illustrating the cover for GQ Japan's June 2020 edition featuring her sister.

In January 2024, Osaka accused her father, Leonard François, of long-term physical abuse.

== ITF Circuit finals ==
=== Singles: 4 (4 runner–ups) ===
Legend $25,000 tournaments $10,000 tournaments	Finals by surface Hard (0–2) Clay (0–2)

Result	W–L	Date	Tournament	Tier	Surface	Opponent	Score
Loss	0–1	Sep 2012	ITF Amelia Island, United States	10,000	Clay	(United States) Jamie Loeb	3–6, 5–7
Loss	0–2	May 2017	ITF Goyang, South Korea	25,000	Hard	(Thailand) Peangtarn Plipuech	6–7^{(7–9)}, 0–6
Loss	0–3	Jul 2017	ITF Denain, France	25,000	Clay	(North Macedonia) Lina Gjorcheska	2–6, 7–5, 6–7^{(6–8)}
Loss	0–4	Oct 2018	ITF Florence, United States	25,000	Hard	(Canada) Bianca Andreescu	4–6, 6–2, 3–6
