= Naomi Osaka =

Japanese tennis player (born 1997)

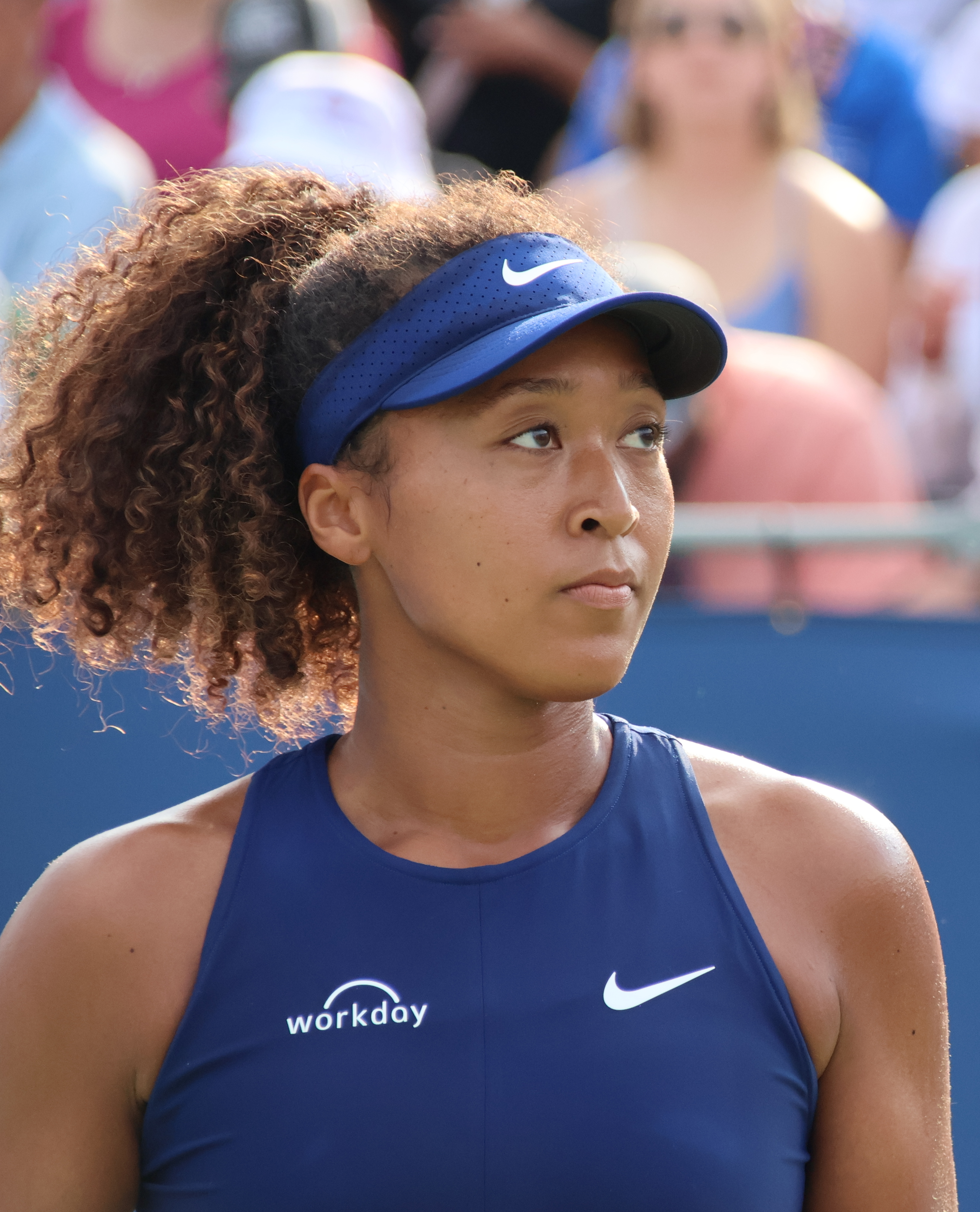
- Osaka in 2025
- Native name: 大坂 なおみ; Ōsaka Naomi
- Country (sports): Japan
- Residence: Beverly Hills, California, US
- Born: October 16, 1997 (age 29) Chūō-ku, Osaka, Japan
- Height: 1.80 m (5 ft 11 in)
- Turned pro: October 2012
- Plays: Right-handed (two-handed backhand)
- Coach: Tomasz Wiktorowski
- Prize money: US$ 25,724,612: 17th all-time in earnings

Singles
- Career record: 342–188
- Career titles: 7
- Highest ranking: No. 1 (January 28, 2019)
- Current ranking: No. 17 (October 5, 2026)

Grand Slam singles results
- Australian Open: W (2019, 2021)
- French Open: 4R (2026)
- Wimbledon: QF (2026)
- US Open: W (2018, 2020)

Other tournaments
- Tour Finals: RR (2018, 2019)
- Olympic Games: 3R (2020)

Doubles
- Career record: 2–15
- Career titles: 0
- Highest ranking: No. 324 (April 3, 2017)

Grand Slam doubles results
- Australian Open: 1R (2017)
- French Open: 2R (2016)
- Wimbledon: 1R (2017)
- US Open: 1R (2016, 2017)

Grand Slam mixed doubles results
- US Open: 1R (2025)

Team competitions
- Fed Cup: WG II PO (2018)
- Hopman Cup: RR (2018)
- Last updated on: July 6, 2026.

Naomi Osaka (Japanese pronunciation: [oːsaka naomi]; born October 16, 1997) is a Japanese professional tennis player. She has been ranked as the world No. 1 in women's singles by the Women's Tennis Association (WTA), the first Asian player to hold the top ranking in singles. Osaka has won seven career singles titles, including four majors: two each at the Australian Open and the US Open. She is the first Japanese player to win a major singles title.

Born in Japan to a Haitian-American father and a Japanese mother, Osaka has lived and trained in the United States since age three. She came to prominence at age 16 when she defeated former US Open champion Samantha Stosur in her WTA Tour debut at the 2014 Stanford Classic. Two years later, she reached her first Tour final at the 2016 Pan Pacific Open and entered the top 50 of the WTA rankings. Osaka broke into the upper echelon of women's tennis in 2018, winning her first Tour title at the Indian Wells Open, then defeating Serena Williams in the final of the US Open. After winning the Australian Open in early 2019, she reached the world No. 1 ranking for the first time. Following two more major titles, in 2021, Osaka suffered from depression and other issues, which led to a publicly scrutinized retirement from the French Open and withdrawal from Wimbledon. She took maternity leave in 2023, returning to competition in 2024.

Osaka is one of the world's most marketable athletes. In 2020, she ranked eighth among athletes in endorsement income and had the highest-ever annual income of any female athlete. Osaka is also recognized as an activist, having showed support for the Black Lives Matter protests. She was named one of the 2020 Sports Illustrated Sportspersons of the Year for her activism, particularly during her US Open championship run. She was selected for the Forbes 30 under 30 list in the Sports & Entertainment categories in 2019, followed by the Forbes 30 under 30 Hall of Fame in 2022. She was also included on Time's annual list of the 100 most influential people in the world in 2019, 2020, and 2021. Osaka was the 2021 Laureus World Sportswoman of the Year. At the 2020 Tokyo Olympics, she became the first tennis player to light the Olympic cauldron during the opening ceremony.

On the court, Osaka has an aggressive playing style with a powerful serve that can reach 201 kilometers per hour (125 mph).

== Early life ==
Naomi Osaka was born on October 16, 1997, in Chūō-ku, Osaka, Japan to Leonard François, who is from Jacmel, Haiti, and Tamaki Osaka (大坂 環, Ōsaka Tamaki), who is from Nemuro, Hokkaido, Japan. She has an older sister, Mari, who was also a professional tennis player. The sisters were given their mother's family name, as that was the practice in Japan when only one parent held native citizenship. Osaka's parents originally met in Sapporo when her father was a visiting college student from NYU.

When Osaka was three years old, her family moved from Japan to the U.S. to live with her father's parents in Elmont, New York on Long Island. Her father was inspired to teach his daughters how to play tennis by watching the Williams sisters compete at the 1999 French Open. Having little experience as a tennis player himself, he sought to emulate how Richard Williams trained his daughters to become two of the best players in the world, despite never having played the sport. François remarked that "the blueprint was already there. I just had to follow it," with regard to the detailed plan Richard had developed for his daughters.

François began coaching Naomi and Mari once they settled in the United States. In 2006, when she was about eight years old, her family moved to Florida so that the girls would have better opportunities to train. She practiced on the Pembroke Pines public courts during the day and was homeschooled at night.

When Naomi was 15 years old, she began working with Patrick Tauma at the ISP Academy. In 2014, she moved to the Harold Solomon Tennis Academy. She later trained at the ProWorld Tennis Academy.

Although Osaka was raised in the United States, her parents decided that their daughters would represent Japan. They said,

We made the decision that Naomi would represent Japan at an early age. She was born in Osaka and was brought up in a household of Japanese and Haitian culture. Quite simply, Naomi and her sister Mari have always felt Japanese so that was our only rationale. It was never a financially motivated decision nor were we ever swayed either way by any national federation.

The parents' decision may have also been motivated by a lack of interest from the United States Tennis Association (USTA) when Osaka was still a young player. The USTA later offered Osaka the opportunity to train at their national training center in Boca Raton, Florida when she was 15 years old, but she declined.

== Career ==
=== 2011–2015: First WTA Tour match win ===
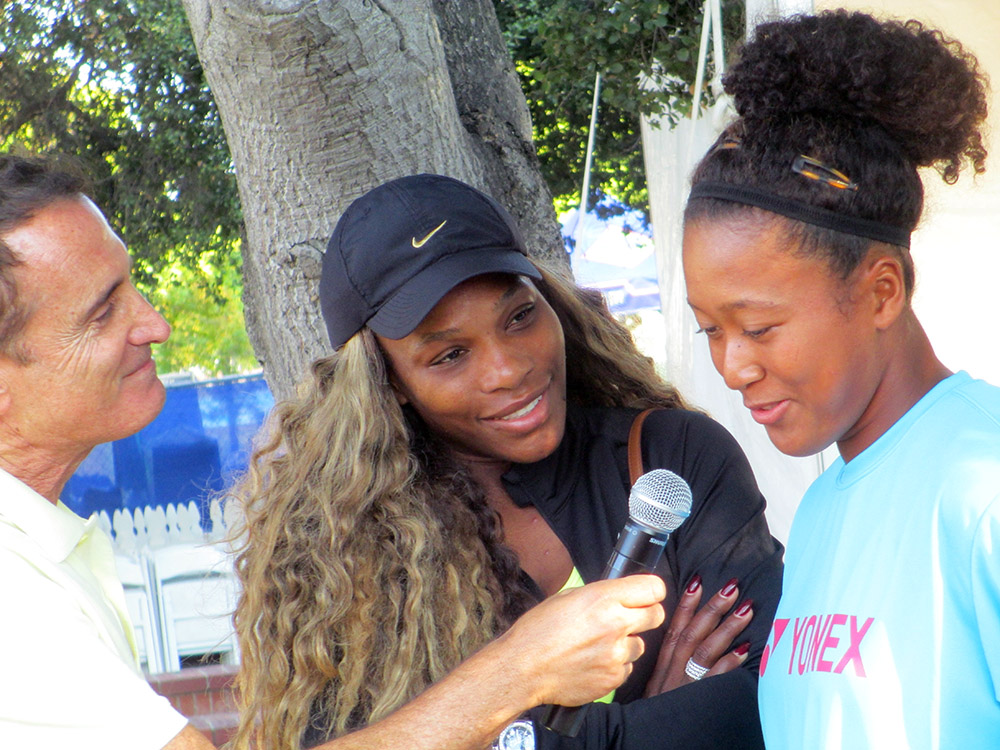
Osaka interviewed at the 2014 Stanford Classic alongside Serena Williams

Osaka never competed on the ITF Junior Circuit, the premier international junior tour, and only played in a small number of junior tournaments at any age level. She instead skipped to the ITF Women's Circuit and played her first qualifying match in October 2011 on her 14th birthday. She then made her professional main-draw debut in doubles at her next tournament in March with her sister Mari. Meanwhile, she did not qualify for her first singles main draw until July in her seventh such attempt. Her best result of the 2012 season came at a 10k event in Amelia Island, where she lost to her sister in the semifinals. Osaka has never won a title on the ITF Circuit, only managing to finish runner-up on four occasions. Her first two finals came at the 25k level, one of which was in June 2013 in El Paso, Texas. The other was in March 2014 in Irapuato, Mexico and included a victory over her sister.

In September 2013, Osaka turned professional shortly before turning 16 years old. She entered her first two qualifying draws on the WTA Tour that same month at the Challenge Bell in Quebec and the Pan Pacific Open in Tokyo. The latter event was her first opportunity to compete professionally in Japan. The following summer, Osaka qualified for her first WTA Tour main draw at the 2014 Stanford Classic. In her tour level debut, she upset world No. 19, Samantha Stosur, in a tight match where she saved a match point in the second set tiebreak and came back from a 5–3 deficit in the third set. She was still just 16 years old and ranked No. 406 at the time. Osaka also won a match as a wildcard at the Japan Women's Open, her only other WTA Tour main draw of the year. These victories helped her progress into the top 250 of the rankings before the end of the season.

Despite not winning another WTA Tour main-draw singles match in 2015, Osaka continued to climb up the rankings. She reached her two highest level finals, the first at the 75k Kangaroo Cup in Japan and the second at the 50k Surbiton Trophy in England. Following these runner-up results, Osaka was ranked high enough to enter qualifying at the last two major singles events of the year, Wimbledon and the US Open. She won her first match at the US Open, but was unable to qualify for either main draw. Nonetheless, Osaka had a strong finish to the year. In October during the WTA Finals, she won the Rising Stars Invitational four-player exhibition tournament, defeating heavy favorite and world No. 35, Caroline Garcia, in the final. Continuing to play in November, Osaka then reached the biggest final of her career at the WTA 125 Hua Hin Championships in Thailand. After a semifinal at a 75k event in Japan, she finished the year ranked No. 144.

=== 2016: Newcomer of the Year, top 50 ===
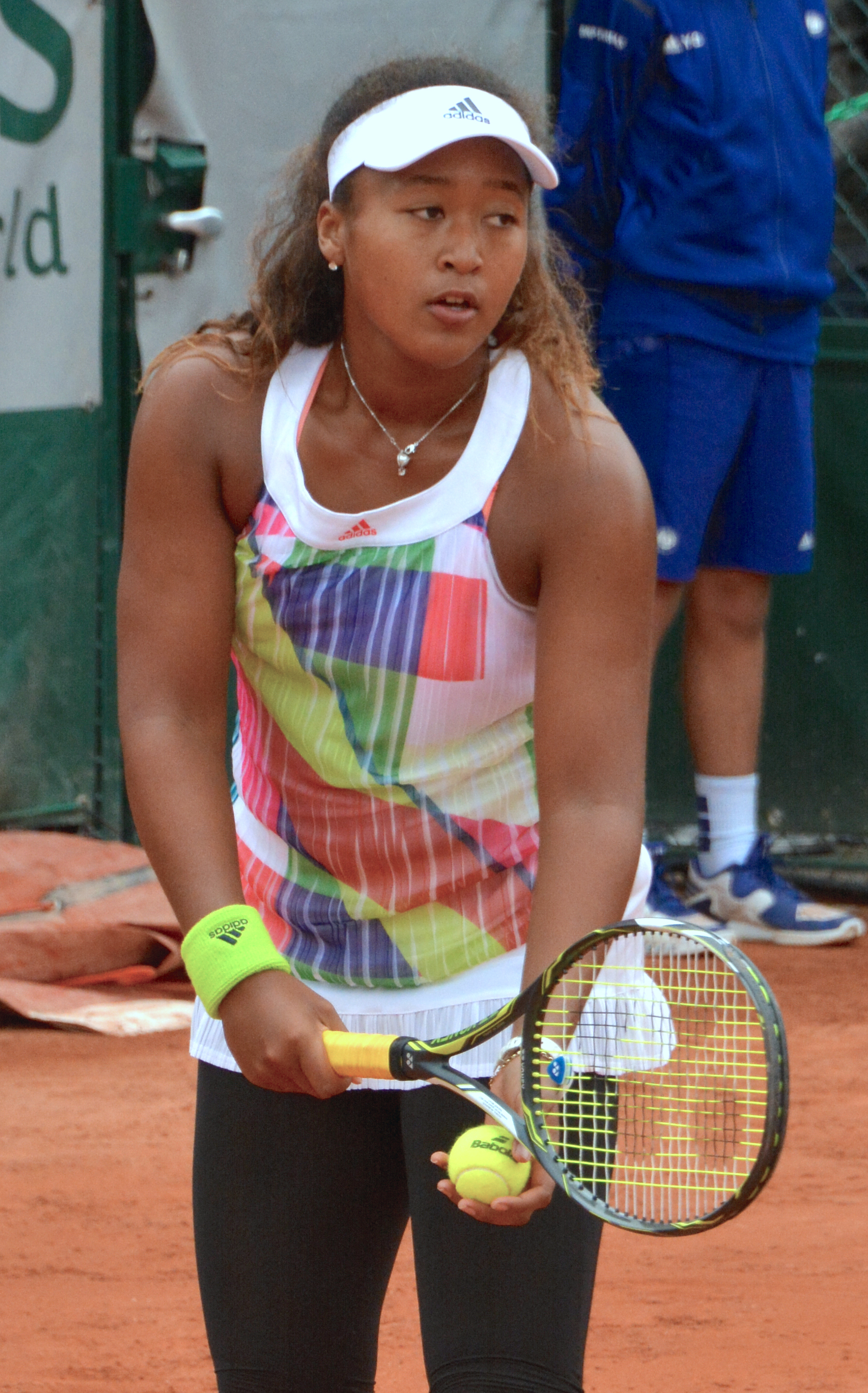
Osaka at the 2016 French Open

Osaka began the season playing three tournaments in Australia. Her results during this stretch were good enough to bring her near the top 100, which allowed her to play in WTA Tour-level events all year. Most notably, she qualified for her first Grand Slam main draw at the Australian Open and made it to the third round. In particular, she upset No. 21, Elina Svitolina, in straight sets in the second round before losing to No. 16, Victoria Azarenka. Back in the United States, Osaka received a wildcard into the Miami Open, her first Premier Mandatory main draw. During the event, she won two matches including a victory over No. 18, Sara Errani. With this success, she progressed into the top 100 of the WTA rankings for the first time.

In the clay-court events leading up to the French Open, Osaka needed to qualify for every event she entered. She only managed to do so at a single event, the Charleston Open, but lost her only match in the main draw. Nonetheless, Osaka was ranked high enough to be directly accepted into the main draw of the French Open. In her debut, she recorded her only two clay-court match-wins of the season. She also won the first set against No. 6 Simona Halep, but ultimately lost the match. She then did not play the grass-court season, after suffering an injury shortly after the French Open.

Osaka returned to tennis in the middle of July. At the US Open in August, she reached the third round at a major event for the third time that year. She upset No. 30 CoCo Vandeweghe in the first round before losing to No. 9 Madison Keys, in three sets. During her match against Keys, she had a 5–1 lead in the third set before ultimately losing in a tiebreak. After the tournament, Osaka began the Asian hardcourt season with two tournaments in Tokyo, first losing in the second round at the Japan Women's Open. Having already reached her first two career WTA quarterfinals earlier in the year, she then made her breakthrough as a wildcard at the Premier-level Pan Pacific Open. She upset No. 12 Dominika Cibulková and No. 20 Svitolina on the road to making her first WTA final at the age of 18. At the time, Cibulkova was the highest-ranked player she ever defeated. Additionally, she was the first Japanese player to contest the final at the event since Kimiko Date in 1995. Osaka ultimately finished runner-up to Caroline Wozniacki. Nonetheless, she entered the top 50 of the WTA rankings for the first time. At the end of the season, she was named the WTA Newcomer of the Year.

=== 2017: Two top-10 victories ===
After her huge improvement the previous year, Osaka was unable to set a new career-high ranking in 2017. Nonetheless, she maintained a steady ranking throughout the season, rising not higher than No. 44 while falling no lower than No. 68, her year-end ranking. She did not win more than two main draw matches at any event all year.

Osaka's best tournament result of the season came at the Canadian Open, where she reached the round of sixteen as a qualifier. During the event, she upset No. 16 Anastasija Sevastova before needing to retire against world No. 1, Karolína Plíšková, due to an abdominal injury. She had won the second set against Plíšková. Her next best results of the year came at the last two major events of the season, where she made it to the third round at each of Wimbledon and the US Open. She had a strong debut at Wimbledon, upsetting No. 23 Barbora Strýcová, before losing to No. 11 Venus Williams. Her US Open was then highlighted by her first-round win against defending champion and No. 6, Angelique Kerber, the first top-ten victory of Osaka's career. However, her run was ended by veteran qualifier Kaia Kanepi. This was the second consecutive year she lost in the third round of the US Open, after having at least a one-break lead in the third set.

Osaka in particular struggled to play on clay courts. After winning her first two matches at the Charleston Open, she did not win another main-draw match on clay the remainder of the season. Osaka did well in her first full grass-court season on the WTA Tour, going 4–4 behind her performance at Wimbledon. Her biggest wins of the year all came on hardcourt. In addition to her results at the Canadian Open and the US Open, she also recorded a second top-ten victory over No. 5, Venus Williams, at the Hong Kong Open, her last tournament of the year.

=== 2018: US Open champion, world No. 4 ===
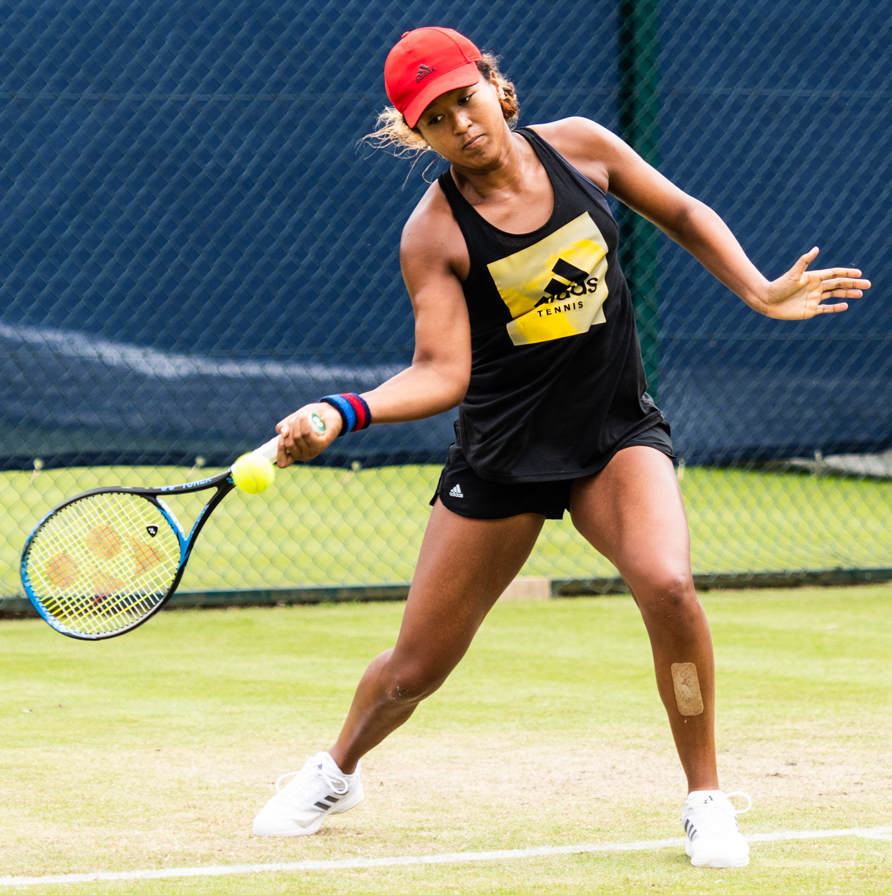
Osaka at the 2018 Nottingham Open

Following her lack of improvement in 2017, Osaka hired Sascha Bajin to be her coach in the off-season. In their second tournament together, Osaka produced her then-career best result at a major event. At the Australian Open, she reached the fourth round, after defeating two top-20 players in Elena Vesnina and hometown favorite Ashleigh Barty, ultimately losing to world No. 1, Simona Halep. This result helped her return to the top 50 within the next month.

At the Indian Wells Open, Osaka had the next big breakthrough of her career. Having never won a professional title or made it past the third round at a Premier Mandatory event, she won the tournament convincingly, only dropping one set in the middle round of the tournament. In the quarterfinals and semifinals, she defeated two top-five opponents in Karolína Plíšková and Halep, the latter of which was her first victory over a current No. 1 player. She then closed out the tournament with a win in the final over fellow up-and-coming player Daria Kasatkina, making her the youngest champion at the event in ten years. With her first title, she surged past her previous career-high ranking to No. 22 in the world. Osaka played the following week as well at the Miami Open and extended her win streak by one additional match in her first meeting against her childhood idol, Serena Williams, who was competing in just her second tournament back from maternity leave.

After her success in the early months of the season, Osaka had a rather quiet middle of the year. She reached the third round at both the French Open and Wimbledon, matching her best performance at each tournament. The closest she came to winning another tournament was on grass at the Nottingham Open, where she lost to top seed Barty in the semifinals.

Osaka did not have another breakthrough result until the US Open, where she won her second title of the year. Like at Indian Wells, she only dropped one set in the middle round of the event, this time to No. 20 Aryna Sabalenka. In the three early rounds, she only lost a total of seven games and notably recorded a double bagel victory against Aliaksandra Sasnovich. Osaka was drawn against Madison Keys in the semifinals, and was able to avenge her tough loss from the 2016 US Open to advance to the final. In the final, she defeated Serena Williams for the second time in 2018 to win her first major title. The match was marred and overshadowed by an on-court dispute between Williams and the umpire highlighted by Williams receiving a game penalty. Boos from the crowd continued during the match and the award ceremony. Osaka later said that the win was "a little bit bittersweet" and "it wasn't necessarily the happiest memory." Nonetheless, she became the first Japanese woman to contest a major singles final and the first Japanese Grand Slam singles champion.

Now ranked in the top ten, Osaka extended her win streak to ten matches by reaching the final at the Pan Pacific Open in Tokyo for the second time in her career. Plíšková was able to end her win streak in the final. Osaka then reached the semifinals at the Premier Mandatory China Open. With her third consecutive deep run, she rose to a career-best ranking of world No. 4, matching the record of Kimiko Date and Kei Nishikori for the highest ranking held by a Japanese player in history. Osaka closed out the year by participating at the WTA Finals, where she was grouped with Sloane Stephens, Angelique Kerber, and Kiki Bertens. She lost all three of her round-robin matches, notably retiring against Bertens due to a hamstring injury to end her season. Osaka finished the year as the WTA Tour leader in prize money, having earned almost $6.4 million.

=== 2019: Australian Open title, world No. 1 ===
Osaka entered the Australian Open as the fourth seed and also one of eleven players in contention for the world No. 1 ranking. She made it to the final against Petra Kvitová, having beaten Hsieh Su-wei in the third round, despite being one set, 2–4 and 0–40 down at one point. Anastasija Sevastova also won the first set against her in the fourth round, while No. 8 Karolína Plíšková pushed her to three sets in the semifinals. After Osaka won the first set in the final, Kvitová saved three championship points before breaking Osaka in back-to-back service games to win the second set. Nonetheless, Osaka recovered to win the championship. She was the first woman to win consecutive major singles titles since Serena Williams in 2015, and was the first player to follow up her first Grand Slam singles title with another at the next such event since Jennifer Capriati in 2001. She also became the first Asian player to be ranked No. 1 in the world in singles. Despite this title, she parted ways with her coach Sascha Bajin following the tournament.

Osaka struggled after the Australian Open. She lost in the fourth and third rounds at the two Premier Mandatory tournaments in March, the Indian Wells Open and the Miami Open. After beginning the clay-court season with a semifinal at the Stuttgart Grand Prix, where she withdrew due to an abdominal injury, her best results were two quarterfinals at the Madrid Open and the Italian Open. She also withdrew from the latter due to a right hand injury. Osaka matched her best result at the French Open, losing to Kateřina Siniaková in the third round. During the grass-court season, Osaka lost in the early rounds to Yulia Putintseva at both tournaments she entered, including the first round at Wimbledon. As a result, she lost the No. 1 ranking to Ashleigh Barty.

Before the US Open, Osaka made the quarterfinals at the two Premier 5 tournaments in August, the Canadian Open and the Cincinnati Open, where she was defeated by Serena Williams and Sofia Kenin respectively. These performances helped her regain the No. 1 ranking so that she had the top seed at the US Open. Nonetheless, her title defense came to an end in the fourth round against Belinda Bencic, who defeated her for the third time during the year. She then fell to No. 4 in the world. Following the tournament, Osaka went back to having her father as her coach. This change had an immediate impact, as Osaka won her next two tournaments. First, she won the Pan Pacific Open in her hometown of Osaka, defeating Anastasia Pavlyuchenkova in the final. Two weeks later, she won the Premier Mandatory China Open. During the tournament, she defeated reigning US Open champion Bianca Andreescu in the quarterfinals and world No. 1 and reigning French Open champion Ashleigh Barty in the final, both in three sets after losing the first. This was Andreescu's first loss since March. These results brought her to No. 3 in the world. At the end of the season, Osaka qualified for the WTA Finals for the second consecutive year. However, after defeating Petra Kvitová in her first match, she withdrew due to injury.

=== 2020: Second US Open title ===
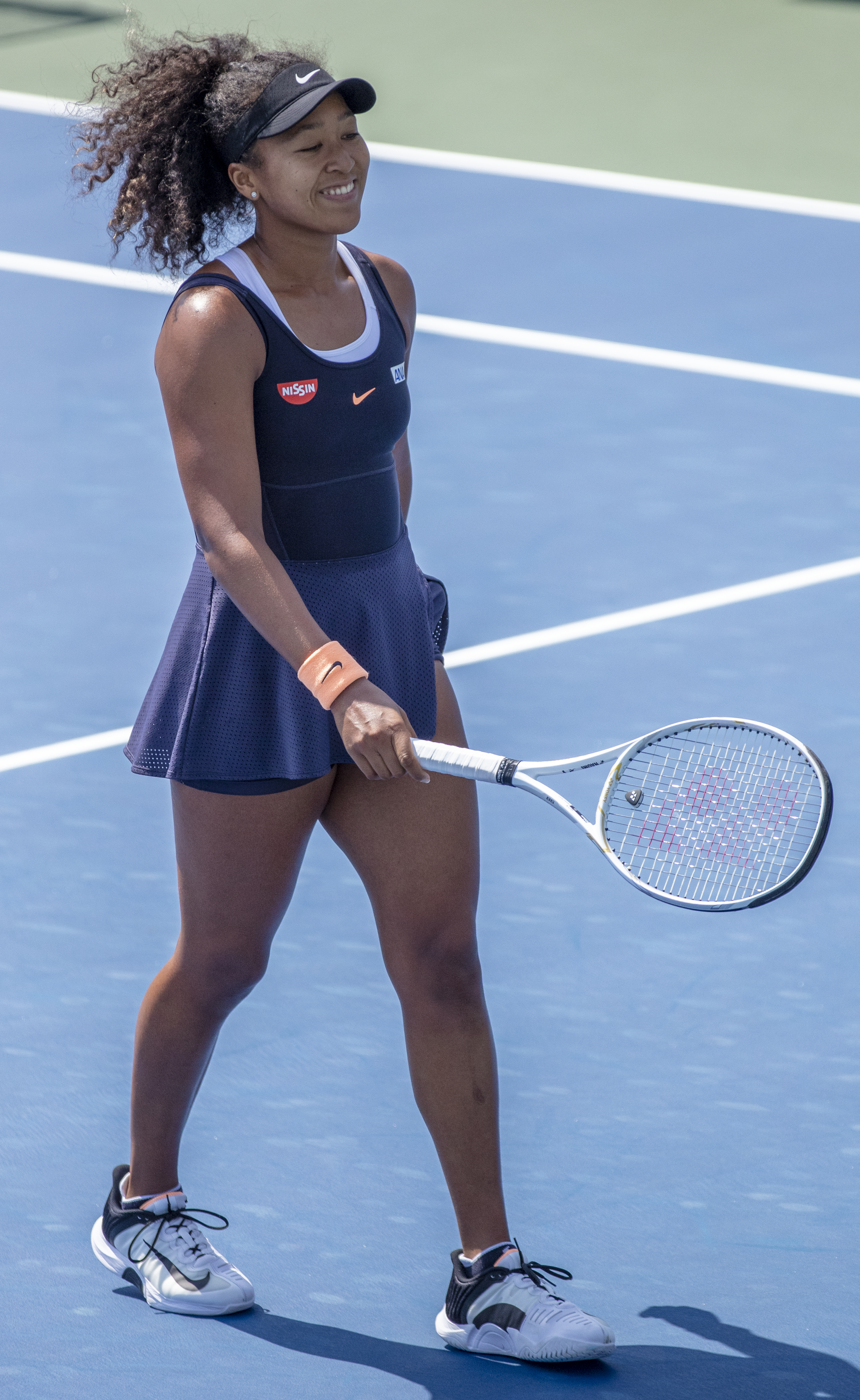
Osaka at the 2020 Cincinnati Open in New York

Osaka only played four tournaments in 2020, largely due to the COVID-19 pandemic. Before the tour shutdown, she lost to No. 2 Karolína Plíšková in a semifinal at the Brisbane International and Coco Gauff in the third round of the Australian Open, squandering a chance to serve for the match in the former. When the tour resumed, Osaka played the Cincinnati Open and the US Open, which were held in back-to-back weeks in New York. Osaka did not lose a match at either event. At the Cincinnati Open, she defeated four players ranked in the 20s before defaulting in the final against Victoria Azarenka due to a hamstring injury. Both Osaka and Azarenka reached the final again at the US Open, where Osaka became the first player to win a US Open women's singles final by coming from a set down since 1994. This was her second US Open title in three years. Following the US Open, Osaka skipped the French Open and ended her season because of her lingering hamstring injury.

During both of these tournaments in New York, Osaka drew attention for her activism. She had initially withdrawn from the Cincinnati Open before the semifinal to raise awareness for the police shooting of Jacob Blake, only staying in the tournament after they chose to support her cause by postponing the event for a day. At the US Open, Osaka walked onto the court for her seven matches wearing a different black mask, each of which with the name of an African American who had been killed in recent years often without significant repercussions.

=== 2021: Australian Open title, mental health issues ===
Osaka was seeded third at the 2021 Australian Open. She recorded straight-sets wins over Anastasia Pavlyuchenkova, Caroline Garcia, and Ons Jabeur, before defeating Garbiñe Muguruza in three sets in the fourth round despite facing match points during the third set (the only match in which she lost a set during the tournament). She went on to defeat Hsieh Su-wei in the quarterfinals, Serena Williams in the semifinals, and 22nd seed Jennifer Brady in the final to claim her second Australian Open title. She became one of only three players in the Open Era to win her first four Grand Slam finals, alongside Roger Federer and Monica Seles.

Osaka returned to the Miami Open as the second seed, making the quarterfinals for the first time. She lost the quarterfinal in a shock defeat to Maria Sakkari, winning just four games. As a result, Osaka missed out on regaining the No. 1 ranking.

Osaka was seeded second at the French Open. Shortly before the start of the tournament, she announced that she would not conduct her mandatory media assignments. After Osaka won her first match in straight sets and did not hold a press conference, she was fined $15,000 and threatened with rising levels of fines and expulsion. The following day, she announced her withdrawal from the tournament, citing mental health issues. Many fellow athletes and sponsors have voiced support for Osaka, with some noting a rarely discussed issue of mental health, although the overall reaction from the wider tennis community was mixed. On June 17, Osaka's agent announced that she would not participate in the upcoming Wimbledon Championships but would take part in the Tokyo Olympics.

Osaka would later return to action at the Cincinnati Open where she was defending finalist. She beat Coco Gauff in the second round but was upset by Jil Teichmann in the third, both in three sets.

At the US Open, Osaka failed to defend her title, losing her composure and the match to the eventual tournament runner-up, Canadian Leylah Fernandez, in the third round, despite serving for the match in the second set. During the match, Osaka threw her racket and received a code violation for hitting a ball into the stands. In her post-match press conference, Osaka announced another hiatus from the sport "for a while", revealing that winning did not make her happy anymore.

=== 2022: Miami Open final ===
Osaka returned to competition at the Melbourne Summer Set tournament seeded No. 1 and made the semifinals, before withdrawing due to an abdominal injury. Her next tournament was the Australian Open, where she was seeded 13th and attempting to defend her title. However, she was eliminated in the third round by Amanda Anisimova, in three sets. Osaka described being happy despite the loss and discussed steps she is taking to improve her mental health and have "more fun on the court".

She dropped 71 spots in the WTA rankings to No. 85 following the tournament, with the tournament absences in 2021 contributing to the drop.

In March, Osaka entered the Indian Wells Open where she beat Sloane Stephens in the first round, but lost to Veronika Kudermetova in straight sets in the second. Osaka was upset by a heckler in the crowd during the second round and was in tears during the match. Interviewed after the match, she compared her treatment to heckling at the tournament in 2001 that led the Williams sisters to boycott it for 13 years.

The following week, Osaka entered the Miami Open. She reached her first final since the 2021 Australian Open after defeating 22nd seed Belinda Bencic in the semifinals. Ranked 77 at the time, she became the lowest ranked finalist in the tournament's history. However, she lost the final to second seed Iga Świątek, in straight sets.

Following a right ankle injury at the Madrid Open, Osaka withdrew from the Italian Open. On May 23, she lost in the first round of the French Open to Anisimova.

Playing for the first time since the French Open, Osaka won her first-round match at San Jose against Zheng Qinwen in three sets, but lost in the next round to Coco Gauff, in straight sets. At the Canadian Open, Osaka retired from her first match against Kaia Kanepi due to back injury. Against home favorite Danielle Collins, Osaka started positive into the US Open but lost the first set in a tiebreak, and her first-round match in two sets. Her troubles continued at the Pan Pacific Open where, as the defending champion, she withdrew in the second round citing abdominal pain. She had played only one game in her first-round match against Daria Gavrilova who retired due to a knee injury.

=== 2023: Pregnancy and hiatus ===
Days before the 2023 Australian Open, Osaka withdrew from the tournament, announcing that she was expecting her first child with rapper Cordae and promising to return for the 2024 Australian Open. In November, she announced that she would return to professional tennis at the 2024 Brisbane International, which preceded the Open by a few weeks.

=== 2024: Two quarterfinals ===
Osaka entered the Brisbane tournament as a wildcard. Playing her first professional match since September 2022, she defeated Tamara Korpatsch in the first round in straight sets, which included a 20-point first set tiebreak, before losing to defending champion Karolína Plíšková in the second round in a tight three-set match.

In the Australian Open, Osaka faced Caroline Garcia in the first round and lost in straight sets. In the Qatar Ladies Open, Osaka reached quarterfinals where she again lost to Karolína Plíšková. Osaka returned to Indian Wells, securing straight-set victories over Sara Errani and Liudmila Samsonova. She fell to the 24th seed Elise Mertens in the third round. In Miami, Osaka took out Elisabetta Cocciaretto and Elina Svitolina in straight sets, before falling to Frenchwoman Carolina Garcia in their third face-off of the year.

Osaka started her clay-court season in Rouen, losing to clay-court specialist and former French Open semifinalist, Martina Trevisan, in straight sets. She returned to Madrid with a comprehensive victory over Greet Minnen. In a tough three-setter, Osaka lost to Samsonova in the second round. She reached the fourth round in Rome, defeating notably seeded Daria Kasatkina and Marta Kostyuk in straight sets, before falling to Zheng Qinwen.

At the French Open, Osaka lost an unexpectedly close second-round match to the three-time winner and world No. 1, Iga Świątek, after having set point in the first set and one match point.

Osaka then returned to grass courts for the first time since 2019 in 's-Hertogenbosch, Netherlands. She made a winning return and beat fourth-seeded Elise Mertens in the first round, eventually making it to the quarterfinals where she was defeated by Bianca Andreescu. At Wimbledon, Osaka got through to the second round, before losing to Emma Navarro.

At the Canadian Open, Osaka defeated Ons Jabeur in the first round, but was eliminated in the second round after losing to Elise Mertens.

She reached the second round at the US Open with a win over tenth seed Jelena Ostapenko, before losing to Karolína Muchová.

Osaka played her next tournament at the China Open, making it through to the fourth round where she retired due to a back injury at the start of the third set against Coco Gauff. On October 21, she announced she was ending her season early because of her back injury.

=== 2025: Canadian Open final, US Open semifinal, return to top 15 ===
Osaka started her 2025 season at the Auckland Open, where she reached her first final since 2022, but retired due to an abdominal injury, after winning the first set against fifth-seeded Clara Tauson. At the Australian Open, Osaka defeated Caroline Garcia and 20th seed Karolína Muchová before retiring against Belinda Bencic in the third round. It was the furthest she had advanced in a major since the 2022 Australian Open, and it boosted her ranking to world No. 42.

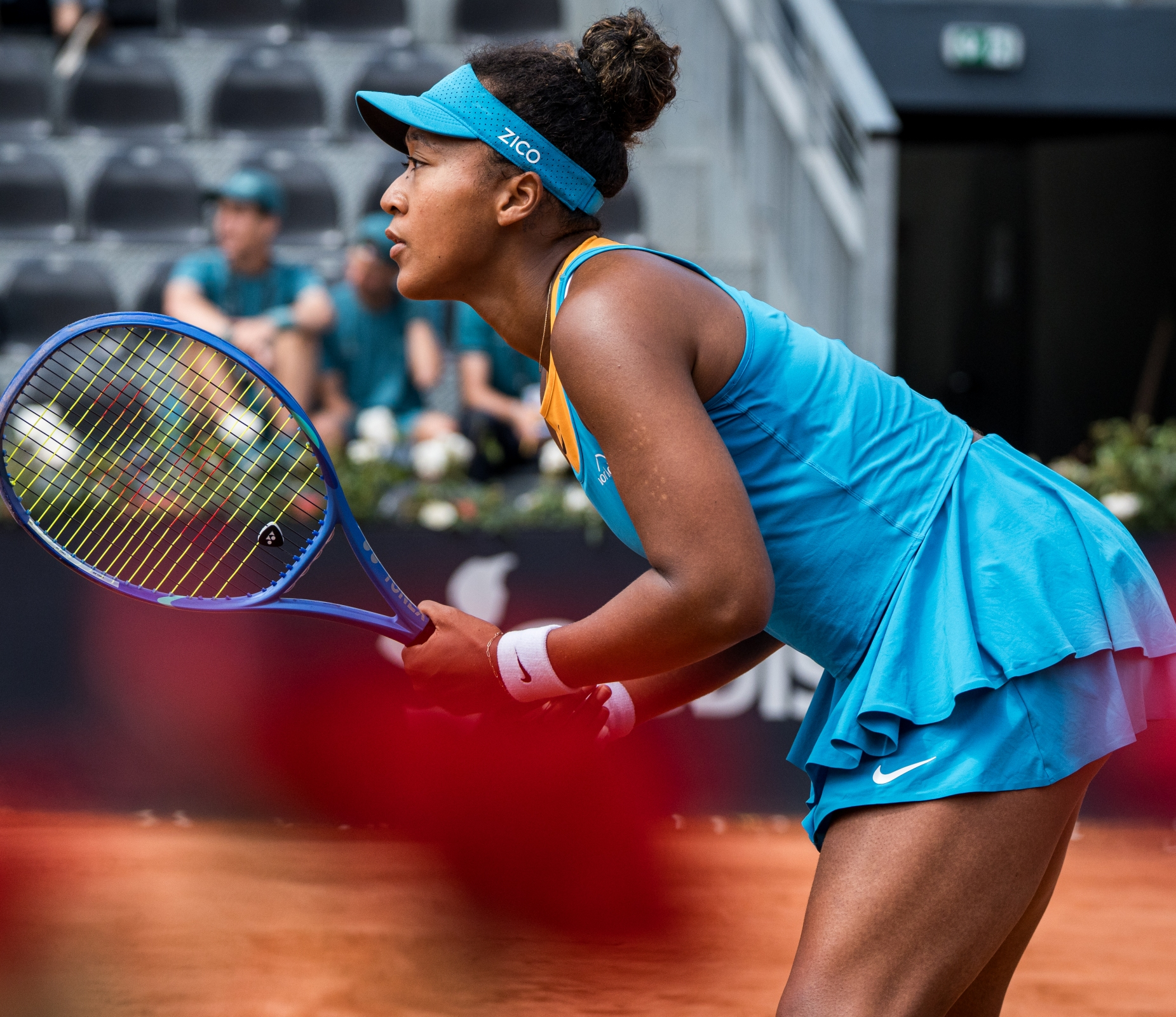
Osaka at the 2025 Italian Open

Osaka at the 2025 Mubadala Citi DC Open

At the DC Open, Osaka entered the singles draw as a wild card."Mubadala Citi DC Open 2025 Player List". Women’s Tennis Association. She defeated Yulia Putintseva 6–2, 7–5 in the first round before losing to fellow former Grand Slam champion Emma Raducanu 6–4, 6–2 in the second round."Osaka defeats Putintseva to make Washington second round". Women’s Tennis Association. July 22, 2025."Takeaways: Raducanu defeats Osaka in D.C. showdown of former Slam champions". Women’s Tennis Association. July 24, 2025. The match was the first meeting between the two former major champions."Takeaways: Raducanu defeats Osaka in D.C. showdown of former Slam champions". Women’s Tennis Association. July 24, 2025.

At the Miami Open, she lost to sixth seed Jasmine Paolini in three sets in the fourth round. After an early loss in Madrid, Osaka entered the minor-league Challenger Tour WTA 125 Open de Saint-Malo tournament, her first appearance in a tournament below Tour-level since 2015. She defeated Kaja Juvan in the final, achieving her first title since the 2021 Australian Open and her first tournament victory on clay. At the French Open, she lost in the first round to 10th seed Paula Badosa. Osaka reached the third round of Wimbledon for the first time since 2018, but lost to Anastasia Pavlyuchenkova.

At the Canadian Open, Osaka beat three top 20 players and saved a match point to reach her first WTA 1000 final since 2022. She lost in three sets to newcomer Victoria Mboko but returned to the top 25 for the first time since January 2022.

At the US Open, Osaka was seeded (No. 23) at a major for the first time since her return. She reached the fourth round at a Slam for the first time since the 2021 Australian Open. Osaka defeated No. 3 seed Coco Gauff to advance to the quarterfinals, where she defeated No. 11 seed Muchová. Despite winning the first set, Osaka lost in three close sets to Amanda Anisimova. She returned to the top 20 for the first time since January 2022 at No. 14.

Osaka's season was ended by an abdominal injury sustained during the Asian swing; she finished the year ranked No. 16.

=== 2026: Fourth round at French Open, Wimbledon quarterfinal, first final on grass ===
Osaka started her season playing for Japan at the 2026 United Cup. After a straight-set loss to Greece's Maria Sakkari, she defeated Great Britain's Katie Swan although Japan ultimately were eliminated at the group stage. On January 24, she withdrew from her third round match at the Australian Open, due to an abdominal injury.

Osaka reached the fourth round at the WTA 1000 tournaments in Indian Wells and Madrid, losing to world No. 1 Aryna Sabalenka on both occasions. Seeded 15th, Osaka also made it into the fourth round at the Italian Open, where her run was ended by fourth seed Iga Świątek. At the French Open, Osaka advanced to the fourth round of the tournament for the first time in her career, where she again lost to Sabalenka.

Osaka reached the first grass court final of her career at Bad Homburg; it was also her first tour level final not on a hard court. She retired trailing by a set against Karolína Muchová. Seeded 14th, she reached the fourth round at Wimbledon for the first time in her career. There, she snapped her losing streak against No. 1 Sabalenka, obtaining her first top 10 win off hard courts and advancing to the quarterfinals of Wimbledon for the first time.

Moving to the hard court, Osaka reached the semifinal of the Washington Open and lost to the eventual champion Alexandra Eala in straight sets. At the Canadian Open, she reached the quarterfinal and lost to Elena Rybakina in three sets. Osaka lost to Rybakina again in the fourth round of the US Open.

== National representation ==
=== Fed Cup ===
Osaka made her Fed Cup debut for Japan in 2017, while the team was competing in the Asia/Oceania Zone Group I. Japan won all nine of their rubbers to advance out of their round-robin pool. Although Osaka won her singles match in the play-off against Kazakhstan, the team lost their other two matches and was not able to advance. The following year with Osaka absent, Japan was able to defeat Kazakhstan in the same group to advance to the 2018 World Group II Play-offs. In this stage, they hosted Great Britain in a usual five rubber tie. At this point, Osaka returned to the team and won her opening match against Heather Watson. After she lost her next rubber to Johanna Konta, Kurumi Nara was also able to defeat Watson to set up a decisive doubles match. Japan won that final rubber to earn promotion to World Group II in 2019.

=== Hopman Cup ===
Osaka made her Hopman Cup debut in 2018 with Yūichi Sugita. Japan was making their first appearance at the exhibition tournament since 2001. They were grouped with Switzerland, the United States, and Russia, and lost all three of their ties. Osaka's only match win came in singles against Russian Anastasia Pavlyuchenkova. She also had a big highlight in the mixed doubles match against Switzerland when she served an ace past Roger Federer.

=== Olympics ===
In the runup to the 2020 Olympics, Osaka—long a dual citizen of Japan and the United States—renounced her American citizenship so she could represent her birth country at the Games.

Osaka lit the Olympic cauldron during the opening ceremony of the 2021 games. Coming into the Tokyo Olympics, Osaka was ranked second in the world. She lost in the third round of the games to eventual finalist and silver medalist Markéta Vondroušová after two straight set victories.

At the 2024 Paris Olympics, Osaka lost in the first round to Angelique Kerber, who was playing in the final tournament of her career.

== Playing style ==
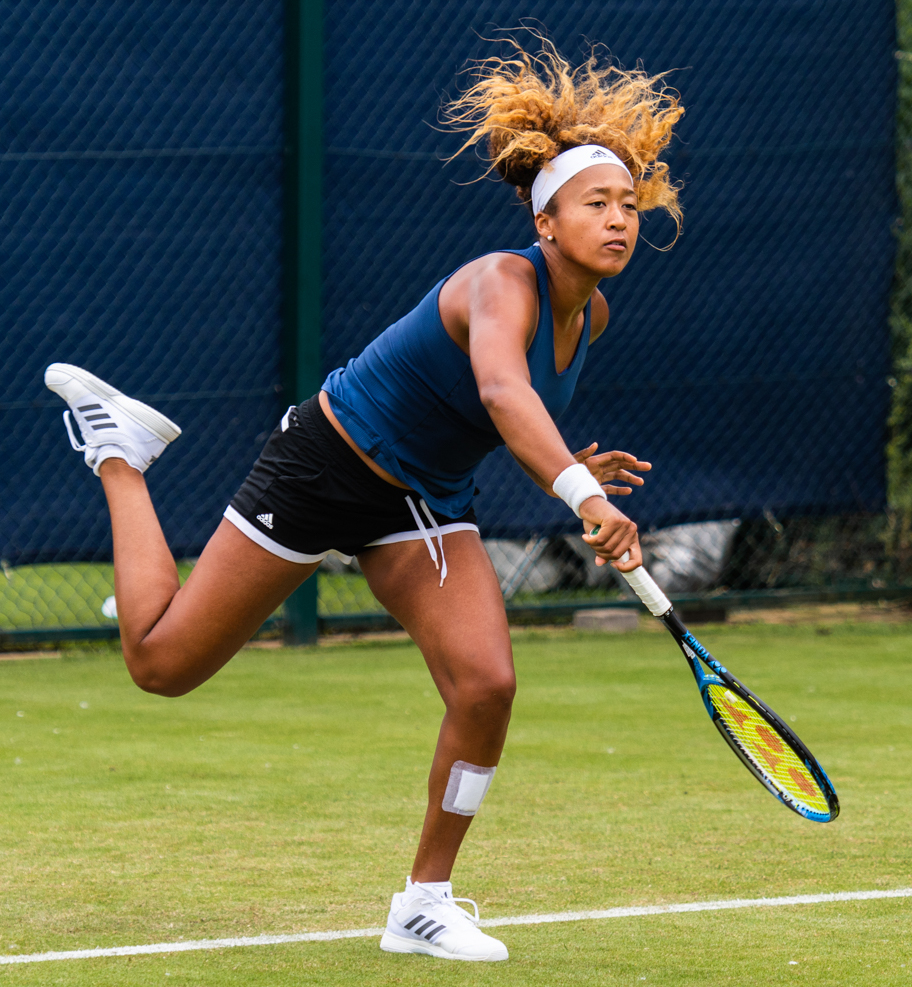
Osaka serves in 2018

Osaka is an aggressive baseline player. She has excellent raw power, especially on her forehand and her serve. Osaka could hit 160 kilometers per hour (100 mph) forehands at the age of sixteen, and her serve has been clocked at up to 200 kilometers per hour (124 mph), making her one of the ten fastest servers on record in WTA history. While she can use her power to hit high numbers of winners, Osaka's key to success is to be able to win long rallies. One of the first notable instances in which that strategy proved successful was when Osaka made her first career WTA final at the 2016 Pan Pacific Open.

Osaka credited improving her mental approach and cutting down on unforced errors for her breakthrough season in 2018. At the Wuhan Open towards the end of the year, she noted, "I think my biggest improvement is mental. My game is more consistent, there are not so many unforced errors. I'm not sure how many I hit today, but sometimes last year I was hitting a lot!" She attributed some of these changes to her coach Sascha Bajin, saying, "Since I was working with [Bajin] — and I tend to be a bit negative on myself — I feel like I've gotten a little bit more optimistic ... I fight myself a lot, so he's sort of been, like, the peacemaker." Bajin also agreed with Osaka on the impact of having a patient, positive approach in each match.

== Coaches ==
Osaka was coached by her father Leonard François from the age of three. Patrick Tauma was one of her first coaches after she began playing on the ITF Women's Circuit. He was her coach in 2013 when she reached her first ITF final. In 2014, she spent seven months training at an academy run by Harold Solomon, a former top five player and French Open finalist who has coached many top women's tennis players including Jennifer Capriati and Mary Joe Fernández. Under Solomon, Osaka defeated Sam Stosur for her first WTA match win. Following her loss at the 2016 US Open where she could not convert a 5–1 lead in the third set, the Japan Tennis Association helped arrange for David Taylor to be her new coach.

After the 2017 season, Osaka switched coaches to Sascha Bajin, who had previously served as a hitting partner to top players such as Serena Williams, Victoria Azarenka, and Caroline Wozniacki. With Bajin as her coach, Osaka won her first Premier Mandatory title and two Grand Slam singles titles. She also rose to No. 1 in the world after having never previously been ranked above No. 40. Bajin was named the inaugural WTA Coach of the Year in 2018. Shortly after her 2019 Australian Open title, Osaka surprisingly split with Bajin, saying, she "wouldn't put success over [her] happiness." She hired Jermaine Jenkins to be her new coach from March until October. Jenkins had previously worked as a hitting partner for Venus Williams. Osaka temporarily replaced him with her father in September. She won her first two tournaments with him back as her coach. Osaka hired Karuê Sell as a hitting partner, a position he ultimately held for close to two years. She subsequently hired Wim Fissette at the start of the 2020 season but announced on September 13, 2024, the end of their coaching relationship.

In September 2024 Osaka added Patrick Mouratoglou as her coach.

In mid-2025 Osaka started being coached by Tomasz Wiktorowski, who previously coached Iga Świątek.

== Endorsements ==
Osaka is one of the most marketable athletes in the world. She earned an estimated $16 million in endorsements alone in 2019, which placed her second among female athletes behind only Serena Williams who earned $25 million. The following year, she became the highest-paid female athlete of all time, having earned $37.4 million in total, including $34 million in endorsements. Overall, she was the 29th highest-paid athlete in 2020 and the 8th highest-paid athlete in endorsements alone.

Nike has been Osaka's apparel sponsor since 2019, having replaced Adidas who had sponsored her for four years. With Nike, Osaka has a clothing collection featuring her monogram logo that uses her initials and is inspired by the Japanese flag. The Japanese sporting equipment manufacturer Yonex has supplied her with rackets since 2008. She plays with the Yonex Ezone 98 racket, equipped with Polytour Pro 125 and Rexis 130 strings. Osaka has been represented by the IMG management company since 2016. In 2022, Osaka left IMG, in order to set up her own sports management agency, Evolve, alongside her agent, Stuart Duguid.

Osaka is a brand ambassador for Japanese automobile manufacturer Nissan and Japanese electronics manufacturer Citizen Watch. She also endorses several other Japanese companies, including noodle maker Nissin Foods, cosmetics producer Shiseido, the broadcasting station Wowow, and airline All Nippon Airways (ANA). Nissin Foods, one of the largest instant noodle companies internationally, was made to apologise and retract an advert, in which the company portrayed Osaka with white skin and light brown hair.

In January 2021, Osaka was named the brand ambassador for Tag Heuer watches, as well as for Louis Vuitton; she appeared in their Spring-Summer 2021 campaign. She is also endorsed by Beats Electronics, Bodyarmor SuperDrink, Mastercard, Panasonic, FTX, PlayStation, Levi's, Airbnb, Sweetgreen, Workday, and GoDaddy. Her endorsement portfolio was estimated to earn Osaka up to $60 million per year. As a result of FTX's $11-billion bankruptcy, Osaka was sued for her involvement. In February 2022, the U.S. 11th Circuit Court of Appeals ruled in a lawsuit against Bitconnect that the Securities Act of 1933 extends to targeted solicitation using social media.

Panasonic announced the signing of Osaka as brand ambassador in June 2021. She is a promoter of the "Panasonic Green Impact" initiative alongside Olympic swimmer Michael Phelps and Olympic figure skater Nathan Chen. Panasonic enlisted the three celebrity athletes for its sustainability mission and they were part of an ad campaign for climate change that included individual commercials and a commercial in which all three athletes are featured.

== Activism ==
Osaka has become a leading activist in professional tennis. Her decision to withdraw from the 2020 Cincinnati Open in New York to raise awareness for the police shooting of Jacob Blake led the tournament to postpone all Association of Tennis Professionals (ATP) and Women's Tennis Association (WTA) matches for a day in support of her cause. At the 2020 US Open beginning the following week, each mask she wore as she walked onto the court (due to the COVID-19 pandemic) prominently displayed the name of an African American who had been killed in the preceding few years, the majority in the year before the tournament, and the majority killed by police. She highlighted Breonna Taylor, Elijah McClain, Ahmaud Arbery, Trayvon Martin, George Floyd, Philando Castile, and Tamir Rice; and was praised directly by the parents of Martin and Arbery. Prior to these acts of activism, Osaka had also travelled to Minnesota to attend the protests of the murder of George Floyd. She outlined her personal reasons for supporting the Black Lives Matter movement and protesting against police brutality in an op-ed in Esquire magazine.

Osaka was named a 2020 Sports Illustrated Sportsperson of the Year for her activism alongside the year's other prominent activist sports champions LeBron James, Breanna Stewart, and Patrick Mahomes, as well as medical worker Laurent Duvernay-Tardif. She was also honored as one of the Time 100 most influential people in the world in 2020 for her activism, having also been named to the list in 2019 for representing professional tennis well as an excellent role model and a major champion. Osaka's activism has drawn attention from the scholarly community studying celebrity and advocacy, especially during the COVID-19 pandemic and following the police murder of George Floyd.

Osaka has been featured as the main character in a manga series published by Kodansha in Nakayoshi, a leading Japanese shojo magazine. The series is being drawn by Futago Kamikita and was made with the help of Osaka's sister Mari. The first edition appeared in the February 2021 issue of the magazine, which was released in December 2020. In March 2021, Osaka spoke out against anti-Asian hate crimes.

== Personal life ==
Osaka began a relationship with American rapper Cordae (then YBN Cordae) in 2019. In January 2023, not long after withdrawing from the Australian Open, Osaka revealed that she was pregnant with her first child with Cordae. Osaka later said she hoped to return to tennis for the 2024 Australian Open in January 2024. During her pregnancy, Osaka received antibiotics to treat Group B streptococcus. She also learned that the umbilical cord had been wrapped around her unborn child's neck. On July 7, 2023, she welcomed a healthy baby girl. On January 6, 2025, Osaka announced that she and Cordae were no longer in a relationship, adding that there is "no bad blood" between the two and that he is a "great person" and "awesome dad".

=== Mental health challenges and advocacy ===
Osaka has lived with depression since the 2018 US Open. In May 2021, she refused to take part in required press conferences during the French Open and was consequently fined $15,000 and threatened with expulsion from the tournament. On May 31, Osaka withdrew from the event to restore her mental health and well-being, which impacted her status as a mental health activist. Less than a month later, she pulled out of Wimbledon to take "some personal time with friends and family." At the 2020 Olympics, she lost in the third round.

In September 2021 at the US Open, she lost to Leylah Fernandez. During the match, she threw her racket three times and received a code violation for firing a ball at the spectators. Asked why, she replied, "I'm not really sure why" and "recently I feel very anxious when things don't go my way." Osaka then announced she was taking an indefinite break from the sport. Later in 2021, she said she was in therapy.

At the 2022 Indian Wells Open, a heckler unsettled Osaka to the point of tears. She returned to therapy and later said it "really helped" and that she is better prepared for incidents. In a May 2022 interview, Osaka said that while there have been ups and downs, she feels very content with her mental health journey.

== Business endeavors ==
In 2021, Osaka became a co-owner of the North Carolina Courage in the National Women's Soccer League, the top level of women's soccer in the U.S. Osaka is an investor in a professional pickleball team which will be based in Miami, Florida, beginning in 2023.

At the end of 2021, Osaka's contract with IMG expired, after six years of representation.

In May 2022, Osaka announced that she and her agent, Stuart Duguid, would form their own sports agency, Evolve. Osaka and Duguid were to have equity stakes in the new agency. On June 20, 2022, Osaka announced that she had signed Nick Kyrgios as her first client.

In 2022, Osaka and Duguid launched Hana Kuma, a media and production company. It was initially launched in partnership with TheSpringHill Company and after a $5 million fundraising round, spun off independently in 2023. The company has many ventures, including the video interview series "Good Trouble with Nick Kyrgios".

In 2024, Hana Kuma announced a partnership with the LPGA to create a brand building program for female golfers.

== Career statistics ==
=== Grand Slam singles performance timeline ===
Key
W	F	SF	QF	#R	RR	Q#	DNQ	A	NH

(W) winner; (F) finalist; (SF) semifinalist; (QF) quarterfinalist; (#R) rounds 4, 3, 2, 1; (RR) round-robin stage; (Q#) qualification round; (DNQ) did not qualify; (A) absent; (NH) not held; (SR) strike rate (events won / competed); (W–L) win–loss record.
To avoid confusion and double counting, these charts are updated at the conclusion of a tournament or when the player's participation has ended.

Naomi Osaka Grand Slam singles statistic
Tournament	2015	2016	2017	2018	2019	2020	2021	2022	2023	2024	2025	2026	SR	W–L	Win %
Australian Open	A	3R	2R	4R	W	3R	W	3R	A	1R	3R	3R (Note: Osaka withdrew before her third round match, and it is not counted as a loss.)	2 / 10	28–7	80%
French Open	A	3R	1R	3R	3R	A	2R (Note: Osaka withdrew before her second round match, and it is not counted as a loss.)	1R	A	2R	1R	4R	0 / 9	11–8	58%
Wimbledon	Q1	A	3R	3R	1R	NH	A	A	A	2R	3R	QF	0 / 6	11–6	65%
US Open	Q2	3R	3R	W	4R	W	3R	1R	A	2R	SF	4R	2 / 10	31–8	79%
Win–loss	0–0	6–3	5–4	14–3	12–3	9–1	9–1	2–3	0–0	3–4	9–4	12–3	4 / 35	81–29	74%

=== Grand Slam tournament finals ===
==== Singles: 4 (4 titles) ====
Naomi Osaka Grand Slam singles finals statistics
Result	Year	Tournament	Surface	Opponent	Score
Win	2018	US Open	Hard	(United States) Serena Williams	6–2, 6–4
Win	2019	Australian Open	Hard	(Czech Republic) Petra Kvitová	7–6^{(7–2)}, 5–7, 6–4
Win	2020	US Open (2)	Hard	(Belarus) Victoria Azarenka	1–6, 6–3, 6–3
Win	2021	Australian Open (2)	Hard	(United States) Jennifer Brady	6–4, 6–3

== See also ==
- Naomi Osaka (TV series)

== Notes ==
Sporting positions
Preceded by (Romania) Simona Halep (Australia) Ashleigh Barty	World No. 1 January 28 – June 23, 2019; August 12 – September 8, 2019	Succeeded by (Australia) Ashleigh Barty (Australia) Ashleigh Barty
Awards
Preceded by (Russia) Daria Gavrilova	WTA Newcomer of the Year; 2016	Succeeded by (United States) Catherine Bellis
Preceded by (United States) Simone Biles	Laureus World Sportswoman of the Year; 2021	Succeeded by Incumbent
Olympic Games
Preceded by (South Korea) Yuna Kim	Final Olympic torchbearer Tokyo 2020 along Ayaka Takahashi	Succeeded by (China) Dinigeer Yilamujiang and Zhao Jiawen
Preceded by (Brazil) Vanderlei de Lima	Final Summer Olympic torchbearer Tokyo 2020 along Ayaka Takahashi	Succeeded by (France) Marie-José Pérec and Teddy Riner
