= 2016 US Open – Day-by-day summaries =

== Day 1 (August 29) ==
- Seeds out:
  - Men's singles: (France) Richard Gasquet [13], (Slovakia) Martin Kližan [28]
  - Women's singles: (Czech Republic) Barbora Strýcová [18], (Romania) Irina-Camelia Begu [21], (Italy) Sara Errani [27], (United States) CoCo Vandeweghe [28], (Japan) Misaki Doi [30], (Puerto Rico) Monica Puig [32]
- Schedule of Play

Matches on main courts
Matches on Arthur Ashe Stadium
Event	Winner	Loser	Score
Women's singles - 1st round	(Italy) Roberta Vinci [7]	(Germany) Anna-Lena Friedsam	6–2, 6–4
Women's singles - 1st round	(Germany) Angelique Kerber [2]	(Slovenia) Polona Hercog	6–0, 1–0, retired
Men's singles - 1st round	(Spain) Rafael Nadal [4]	(Uzbekistan) Denis Istomin	6–1, 6–4, 6–2
2016 US Open Opening Night Ceremony
Men's singles - 1st round	(Serbia) Novak Djokovic [1]	(Poland) Jerzy Janowicz [PR]	6–3, 5–7, 6–2, 6–1
Women's singles - 1st round	(United States) Madison Keys [8]	(United States) Alison Riske	4–6, 7–6^{(7–5)}, 6–2
Matches on Louis Armstrong Stadium
Event	Winner	Loser	Score
Men's singles - 1st round	(Croatia) Marin Čilić [7]	(Brazil) Rogério Dutra Silva	6–4, 7–5, 6–1
Women's singles - 1st round	(Russia) Svetlana Kuznetsova [9]	(Italy) Francesca Schiavone	6–1, 6–2
Women's singles - 1st round	(Spain) Garbiñe Muguruza [3]	(Belgium) Elise Mertens [Q]	2–6, 6–0, 6–3
Men's singles - 1st round	(United States) Jack Sock [26]	(United States) Taylor Fritz	7–6^{(7–3)}, 7–5, 3–6, 1–6, 6–4
Matches on Grandstand
Event	Winner	Loser	Score
Women's singles - 1st round	(Denmark) Caroline Wozniacki	(United States) Taylor Townsend [Q]	4–6, 6–3, 6–4
Men's singles - 1st round	(United States) John Isner [20]	(United States) Frances Tiafoe [WC]	3–6, 4–6, 7–6^{(7–5)}, 6–2, 7–6^{(7–3)}
Men's singles - 1st round	(France) Jo-Wilfried Tsonga [9]	(Argentina) Guido Andreozzi [Q]	6–3, 6–4, 6–4
Women's singles - 1st round	(United Kingdom) Johanna Konta [13]	(United States) Bethanie Mattek-Sands [WC]	6–3, 6–3
Colored background indicates a night match
Matches start at 11am, night session starts at 7pm Eastern Daylight Time (EDT)

== Day 2 (August 30) ==
- Seeds out:
  - Men's singles: (Belgium) David Goffin [12], (Australia) Bernard Tomic [17], (Germany) Philipp Kohlschreiber [25], (United States) Sam Querrey [29]
  - Women's singles: (Netherlands) Kiki Bertens [20], (Russia) Daria Kasatkina [23], (Serbia) Ana Ivanovic [29]
- Schedule of Play

Matches on main courts
Matches on Arthur Ashe Stadium
Event	Winner	Loser	Score
Women's singles - 1st round	(Romania) Simona Halep [5]	(Belgium) Kirsten Flipkens	6–0, 6–2
Men's singles - 1st round	(Switzerland) Stan Wawrinka [3]	(Spain) Fernando Verdasco	7–6^{(7–4)}, 6–4, 6–4
Women's singles - 1st round	(United States) Venus Williams [6]	(Ukraine) Kateryna Kozlova	6–2, 5–7, 6–4
Women's singles - 1st round	(United States) Serena Williams [1]	(Russia) Ekaterina Makarova	6–3, 6–3
Men's singles - 1st round	(United Kingdom) Andy Murray [2]	(Czech Republic) Lukáš Rosol	6–3, 6–2, 6–2
Matches on Louis Armstrong Stadium
Event	Winner	Loser	Score
Women's singles - 1st round	(Czech Republic) Denisa Allertová	(Serbia) Ana Ivanovic [29]	7–6^{(7–4)}, 6–1
Men's singles - 1st round	(Serbia) Janko Tipsarević [PR]	(United States) Sam Querrey [29]	7–6^{(7–4)}, 6–7^{(0–7)}, 6–3, 6–3
Men's singles - 1st round	(Argentina) Juan Martín del Potro [WC]	(Argentina) Diego Schwartzman	6–4, 6–4, 7–6^{(7–3)}
Women's singles - 1st round	(Poland) Agnieszka Radwańska [4]	(United States) Jessica Pegula [Q]	6–1, 6–1
Matches on Grandstand
Event	Winner	Loser	Score
Men's singles - 1st round	(Japan) Kei Nishikori [6]	(Germany) Benjamin Becker	6–1, 6–1, 3–6, 6–3
Women's singles - 1st round	(Czech Republic) Kateřina Siniaková	(Canada) Eugenie Bouchard	6–3, 3–6, 6–2
Women's singles - 1st round	(Russia) Anastasia Pavlyuchenkova [17]	(United States) Louisa Chirico	6–1, 6–4
Men's singles - 1st round	(United States) Steve Johnson [19]	(Russia) Evgeny Donskoy	4–6, 1–6, 7–6^{(7–2)}, 6–3, 6–3
Colored background indicates a night match
Matches start at 11am, night session starts at 7pm Eastern Daylight Time (EDT)

== Day 3 (August 31) ==
- Seeds out:
  - Men's singles: (Canada) Milos Raonic [5], (Uruguay) Pablo Cuevas [18], (Spain) Albert Ramos Viñolas [31], (France) Benoît Paire [32]
  - Women's singles: (Spain) Garbiñe Muguruza [3], (Russia) Svetlana Kuznetsova [9]
  - Men's doubles: (Croatia) Ivan Dodig / (Brazil) Marcelo Melo [2], (France) Julien Benneteau / (France) Édouard Roger-Vasselin [11], (Colombia) Juan Sebastián Cabal / (Colombia) Robert Farah [13], (Czech Republic) Radek Štěpánek / (Serbia) Nenad Zimonjić [16]
  - Mixed doubles: (United States) Raquel Atawo / (Netherlands) Jean-Julien Rojer [4]
- Schedule of Play

Matches on main courts
Matches on Arthur Ashe Stadium
Event	Winner	Loser	Score
Women's singles - 2nd round	(Czech Republic) Petra Kvitová [14]	(Turkey) Çağla Büyükakçay	7–6^{(7–2)}, 6–3
Women's singles - 2nd round	(Denmark) Caroline Wozniacki	(Russia) Svetlana Kuznetsova [9]	6–4, 6–4
Men's singles - 2nd round	(Serbia) Novak Djokovic [1]	(Czech Republic) Jiří Veselý	Walkover
Men's singles - 2nd round (Note: This match was originally scheduled to play on Court 13 but was moved to Arthur Ashe Stadium following Veselý's withdrawal.)	(France) Gaël Monfils [10]	(Czech Republic) Jan Šátral [Q]	7–5, 6–4, 6–3
Women's singles - 2nd round	(Latvia) Anastasija Sevastova	(Spain) Garbiñe Muguruza [3]	7–5, 6–4
Men's singles - 2nd round	(Spain) Rafael Nadal [4]	(Italy) Andreas Seppi	6–0, 7–5, 6–1
Matches on Louis Armstrong Stadium
Event	Winner	Loser	Score
Women's singles - 2nd round	(Italy) Roberta Vinci [7]	(United States) Christina McHale	6–1, 6–3
Men's singles - 2nd round	(United States) John Isner [20]	(Belgium) Steve Darcis [Q]	6–3, 6–4, 6–7^{(10–12)}, 6–3
Women's singles - 2nd round	(Germany) Angelique Kerber [2]	(Croatia) Mirjana Lučić-Baroni	6–2, 7–6^{(9–7)}
Men's singles - 2nd round	(United States) Jack Sock [26]	(Germany) Mischa Zverev [Q]	6–1, 6–1, 6–2
Women's singles - 2nd round (Note: This match was originally scheduled to play on Grandstand but was moved to Louis Armstrong Stadium after the conclusion of the Sock-M. Zverev match.)	(United States) Madison Keys [8]	(United States) Kayla Day [WC]	6–1, 6–1
Matches on Grandstand
Event	Winner	Loser	Score
Men's singles - 2nd round	(South Africa) Kevin Anderson [23]	(Canada) Vasek Pospisil	7–6^{(7–3)}, 6–4, 6–4
Men's singles - 2nd round	(United States) Ryan Harrison [Q]	(Canada) Milos Raonic [5]	6–7^{(4–7)}, 7–5, 7–5, 6–1
Women's singles - 2nd round	(United States) Catherine Bellis [Q]	(United States) Shelby Rogers	2–6, 6–2, 6–2
Colored background indicates a night match
Matches start at 11am, night session starts at 7pm Eastern Daylight Time (EDT)

== Day 4 (September 1) ==
- Seeds out:
  - Men's singles: (Spain) Feliciano López [16], (United States) Steve Johnson [19], (Germany) Alexander Zverev [27], (France) Gilles Simon [30]
  - Women's singles: (Switzerland) Timea Bacsinszky [15], (Australia) Samantha Stosur [16]
  - Men's doubles: (Canada) Daniel Nestor / (Canada) Vasek Pospisil [6], (Philippines) Treat Huey / (Belarus) Max Mirnyi [9]
- Schedule of Play

Matches on main courts
Matches on Arthur Ashe Stadium
Event	Winner	Loser	Score
Women's singles - 2nd round	(Romania) Simona Halep [5]	(Czech Republic) Lucie Šafářová	6–3, 6–4
Men's singles - 2nd round	(United Kingdom) Andy Murray [2]	(Spain) Marcel Granollers	6–4, 6–1, 6–4
Women's singles - 2nd round	(United States) Venus Williams [6]	(Germany) Julia Görges	6–2, 6–3
Women's singles - 2nd round	(United States) Serena Williams [1]	(United States) Vania King [WC]	6–3, 6–3
Men's singles - 2nd round	(Argentina) Juan Martín del Potro [WC]	(United States) Steve Johnson [19]	7–6^{(7–5)}, 6–3, 6–2
Matches on Louis Armstrong Stadium
Event	Winner	Loser	Score
Men's singles - 2nd round	(Japan) Kei Nishikori [6]	(Russia) Karen Khachanov [Q]	6–4, 4–6, 6–4, 6–3
Women's singles - 2nd round	(Poland) Agnieszka Radwańska [4]	(United Kingdom) Naomi Broady	7–6^{(11–9)}, 6–3
Men's singles - 2nd round	(Switzerland) Stan Wawrinka [3]	(Italy) Alessandro Giannessi [Q]	6–1, 7–6^{(7–4)}, 7–5
Matches on Grandstand
Event	Winner	Loser	Score
Women's singles - 2nd round	(Czech Republic) Karolína Plíšková [10]	(Paraguay) Montserrat González [Q]	6–1, 7–5
Men's singles - 2nd round	(Austria) Dominic Thiem [8]	(Lithuania) Ričardas Berankis	6–4, 6–3, 6–2
Women's singles - 2nd round	(China) Zhang Shuai	(Australia) Samantha Stosur [16]	6–3, 6–3
Men's singles - 2nd round	(Australia) Nick Kyrgios [14]	(Argentina) Horacio Zeballos	7–5, 6–4, 6–4
Colored background indicates a night match
Matches start at 11am, night session starts at 7pm Eastern Daylight Time (EDT)

== Day 5 (September 2) ==
- Seeds out:
  - Men's singles: (Croatia) Marin Čilić [7], (Spain) Roberto Bautista Agut [15], (United States) John Isner [20], (South Africa) Kevin Anderson [23]
  - Women's singles: (Slovakia) Dominika Cibulková [12], (Ukraine) Elina Svitolina [22], (Switzerland) Belinda Bencic [24]
  - Men's doubles: (Uruguay) Pablo Cuevas / (Spain) Marcel Granollers [14], (Austria) Oliver Marach / (France) Fabrice Martin [15]
  - Women's doubles: (Chinese Taipei) Chan Hao-ching / (Chinese Taipei) Chan Yung-jan [2], (United States) Raquel Atawo / (United States) Abigail Spears [9], (Croatia) Darija Jurak / (Australia) Anastasia Rodionova [14], (Netherlands) Kiki Bertens / (Sweden) Johanna Larsson [15]
  - Mixed doubles: (Czech Republic) Lucie Hradecká / (Poland) Marcin Matkowski [8]
- Schedule of Play

Matches on main courts
Matches on Arthur Ashe Stadium
Event	Winner	Loser	Score
Women's singles - 3rd round	(Denmark) Caroline Wozniacki	(Romania) Monica Niculescu	6–3, 6–1
Women's singles - 3rd round	(United States) Madison Keys [8]	(Japan) Naomi Osaka	7–5, 4–6, 7–6^{(7–3)}
Men's singles - 3rd round	(Serbia) Novak Djokovic [1]	(Russia) Mikhail Youzhny	4–2, retired
Men's singles - 3rd round	(Spain) Rafael Nadal [4]	(Russia) Andrey Kuznetsov	6–1, 6–4, 6–2
Women's singles - 3rd round	(Germany) Angelique Kerber [2]	(United States) CiCi Bellis [Q]	6–1, 6–1
Matches on Louis Armstrong Stadium
Event	Winner	Loser	Score
Women's singles - 3rd round	(Italy) Roberta Vinci [7]	(Germany) Carina Witthöft	6–0, 5–7, 6–3
Men's singles - 3rd round	(United States) Jack Sock [26]	(Croatia) Marin Čilić [7]	6–4, 6–3, 6–3
Women's singles - 3rd round	(Czech Republic) Petra Kvitová [14]	(Ukraine) Elina Svitolina [22]	6–3, 6–4
Men's singles - 3rd round	(United Kingdom) Kyle Edmund	(United States) John Isner [20]	6–4, 3–6, 6–2, 7–6^{(7–5)}
Matches on Grandstand
Event	Winner	Loser	Score
Men's singles - 3rd round	(France) Jo-Wilfried Tsonga [9]	(South Africa) Kevin Anderson [23]	6–3, 6–4, 7–6^{(7–4)}
Women's singles - 3rd round	(United Kingdom) Johanna Konta [13]	(Switzerland) Belinda Bencic [24]	6–2, 6–1
Men's singles - 3rd round	(France) Gaël Monfils [10]	(Spain) Nicolás Almagro	6–4, 6–2, 6–4
Men's doubles - 2nd round	(United States) Bob Bryan [3] (United States) Mike Bryan [3]	(Israel) Jonathan Erlich (Mexico) Santiago González	6–4, 6–4
Mixed doubles - 1st round	(Canada) Gabriela Dabrowski (India) Rohan Bopanna	(United States) Jamie Loeb [WC] (United States) Noah Rubin [WC]	7–5, 6–4
Colored background indicates a night match
Matches start at 11am, night session starts at 7pm Eastern Daylight Time (EDT)

== Day 6 (September 3) ==
- Seeds out:
  - Men's singles: (Spain) David Ferrer [11], (Australia) Nick Kyrgios [14]
  - Women's singles: (Russia) Anastasia Pavlyuchenkova [17], (Russia) Elena Vesnina [19], (France) Caroline Garcia [25], (Germany) Laura Siegemund [26], (Hungary) Tímea Babos [31]
  - Men's doubles: (South Africa) Raven Klaasen / (United States) Rajeev Ram [7], (Finland) Henri Kontinen / (Australia) John Peers [10]
  - Mixed doubles: (Czech Republic) Andrea Hlaváčková / (Poland) Łukasz Kubot [6]
- Schedule of Play

Matches on main courts
Matches on Arthur Ashe Stadium
Event	Winner	Loser	Score
Women's singles - 3rd round	(Romania) Simona Halep [5]	(Hungary) Tímea Babos [31]	6–1, 2–6, 6–4
Women's singles - 3rd round	(United States) Serena Williams [1]	(Sweden) Johanna Larsson	6–2, 6–1
Men's singles - 3rd round	(United Kingdom) Andy Murray [2]	(Italy) Paolo Lorenzi	7–6^{(7–4)}, 5–7, 6–2, 6–3
Women's singles - 3rd round	(United States) Venus Williams [6]	(Germany) Laura Siegemund [26]	6–1, 6–2
Men's singles - 3rd round	(Ukraine) Illya Marchenko	(Australia) Nick Kyrgios [14]	4–6, 6–4, 6–1, retired
Matches on Louis Armstrong Stadium
Event	Winner	Loser	Score
Women's singles - 3rd round	(Spain) Carla Suárez Navarro [11]	(Russia) Elena Vesnina [19]	6–4, 6–3
Women's singles - 3rd round	(Poland) Agnieszka Radwańska [4]	(France) Caroline Garcia [25]	6–2, 6–3
Men's singles - 3rd round	(Argentina) Juan Martín del Potro [WC]	(Spain) David Ferrer [11]	7–6^{(7–2)}, 6–2, 6–3
Men's singles - 3rd round	(Switzerland) Stan Wawrinka [3]	(United Kingdom) Daniel Evans	4–6, 6–3, 6–7^{(6–8)}, 7–6^{(10–8)}, 6–2
Matches on Grandstand
Event	Winner	Loser	Score
Men's singles - 3rd round	(Austria) Dominic Thiem [8]	(Spain) Pablo Carreño Busta	1–6, 6–4, 6–4, 7–5
Women's singles - 3rd round	(Croatia) Ana Konjuh	(United States) Varvara Lepchenko	6–3, 3–6, 6–2
Women's singles - 3rd round	(Czech Republic) Karolína Plíšková [10]	(Russia) Anastasia Pavlyuchenkova [17]	6–2, 6–4
Men's singles - 3rd round	(Japan) Kei Nishikori [6]	(France) Nicolas Mahut	4–6, 6–1, 6–2, 6–2
Colored background indicates a night match
Matches start at 11am, night session starts at 7pm Eastern Daylight Time (EDT)

== Day 7 (September 4) ==
- Seeds out:
  - Men's singles: (Spain) Rafael Nadal [4], (United States) Jack Sock [26]
  - Women's singles: (United States) Madison Keys [8], (United Kingdom) Johanna Konta [13], (Czech Republic) Petra Kvitová [14]
  - Women's doubles: (Hungary) Tímea Babos / (Kazakhstan) Yaroslava Shvedova [3], (Germany) Julia Görges / (Czech Republic) Karolína Plíšková [8], (United States) Vania King / (Romania) Monica Niculescu [10], (China) Xu Yifan / (China) Zheng Saisai [11]
  - Mixed doubles: (India) Sania Mirza / (Croatia) Ivan Dodig [1], (Chinese Taipei) Chan Hao-ching / (Belarus) Max Mirnyi [5]
- Schedule of Play

Matches on main courts
Matches on Arthur Ashe Stadium
Event	Winner	Loser	Score
Women's singles - 4th round	(Latvia) Anastasija Sevastova	(United Kingdom) Johanna Konta [13]	6–4, 7–5
Women's singles - 4th round	(Denmark) Caroline Wozniacki	(United States) Madison Keys [8]	6–3, 6–4
Men's singles - 4th round	(France) Lucas Pouille [24]	(Spain) Rafael Nadal [4]	6–1, 2–6, 6–4, 3–6, 7–6^{(8–6)}
Women's singles - 4th round	(Germany) Angelique Kerber [2]	(Czech Republic) Petra Kvitová [14]	6–3, 7–5
Men's singles - 4th round	(Serbia) Novak Djokovic [1]	(United Kingdom) Kyle Edmund	6–2, 6–1, 6–4
Matches on Louis Armstrong Stadium
Event	Winner	Loser	Score
Women's singles - 4th round	(Italy) Roberta Vinci [7]	(Ukraine) Lesia Tsurenko	7–6^{(7–5)}, 6–2
Men's singles - 4th round	(France) Jo-Wilfried Tsonga [9]	(United States) Jack Sock [26]	6–3, 6–3, 6–7^{(7–9)}, 6–2
Men's doubles - 3rd round	(United States) Bob Bryan [3] (United States) Mike Bryan [3]	(Spain) David Marrero (Spain) Fernando Verdasco	2–6, 6–3, 7–5
Matches on Grandstand
Event	Winner	Loser	Score
Men's singles - 4th round	(France) Gaël Monfils [10]	(Cyprus) Marcos Baghdatis	6–3, 6–2, 6–3
Men's doubles - 3rd round	(Spain) Pablo Carreño Busta (Spain) Guillermo García López	(United States) Nicholas Monroe (United States) Donald Young	4–6, 7–6^{(7–4)}, 6–3
Women's doubles - 3rd round	(Switzerland) Martina Hingis [6] (United States) CoCo Vandeweghe [6]	(China) Xu Yifan [11] (China) Zheng Saisai [11]	6–4, 4–6, 6–2
Colored background indicates a night match
Matches start at 11am, night session starts at 7pm Eastern Daylight Time (EDT)

== Day 8 (September 5) ==
- Seeds out:
  - Men's singles: (Austria) Dominic Thiem [8], (Croatia) Ivo Karlović [21], (Bulgaria) Grigor Dimitrov [22]
  - Women's singles: (Poland) Agnieszka Radwańska [4], (United States) Venus Williams [6], (Spain) Carla Suárez Navarro [11]
  - Men's doubles: (Netherlands) Jean-Julien Rojer / (Romania) Horia Tecău [5]
  - Women's doubles: (Czech Republic) Andrea Hlaváčková / (Czech Republic) Lucie Hradecká [4]
- Schedule of Play

Matches on main courts
Matches on Arthur Ashe Stadium
Event	Winner	Loser	Score
Men's singles - 4th round	(Argentina) Juan Martín del Potro [WC]	(Austria) Dominic Thiem [8]	6–3, 3–2, retired
Women's singles - 4th round	(Czech Republic) Karolína Plíšková [10]	(United States) Venus Williams [6]	4–6, 6–4, 7–6^{(7–3)}
Women's singles - 4th round	(United States) Serena Williams [1]	(Kazakhstan) Yaroslava Shvedova	6–2, 6–3
Men's singles - 4th round	(United Kingdom) Andy Murray [2]	(Bulgaria) Grigor Dimitrov [22]	6–1, 6–2, 6–2
Women's singles - 4th round	(Croatia) Ana Konjuh	(Poland) Agnieszka Radwańska [4]	6–4, 6–4
Matches on Louis Armstrong Stadium
Event	Winner	Loser	Score
Women's singles - 4th round	(Romania) Simona Halep [5]	(Spain) Carla Suárez Navarro [11]	6–2, 7–5
Men's singles - 4th round	(Switzerland) Stan Wawrinka [3]	(Ukraine) Illya Marchenko	6–4, 6–1, 6–7^{(5–7)}, 6–3
Men's singles - 4th round	(Japan) Kei Nishikori [6]	(Croatia) Ivo Karlović [21]	6–3, 6–4, 7–6^{(7–4)}
Mixed doubles - Quarterfinals	(United States) CoCo Vandeweghe [7] (United States) Rajeev Ram [7]	(Czech Republic) Barbora Krejčíková (Croatia) Marin Draganja	6–3, 6–3
Matches on Grandstand
Event	Winner	Loser	Score
Women's doubles - 3rd round	(Slovenia) Andreja Klepač [13] (Slovenia) Katarina Srebotnik [13]	(Russia) Alla Kudryavtseva (Germany) Sabine Lisicki	7–6^{(7–3)}, 6–0
Men's doubles - 3rd round	(France) Pierre-Hugues Herbert [1] (France) Nicolas Mahut [1]	(France) Jérémy Chardy (Australia) Sam Groth	6–4, 5–7, 6–4
Women's doubles - 3rd round	(India) Sania Mirza [7] (Czech Republic) Barbora Strýcová [7]	(United States) Nicole Gibbs (Japan) Nao Hibino	6–4, 7–5
Men's doubles - 3rd round	(United Kingdom) Jamie Murray [4] (Brazil) Bruno Soares [4]	(United States) Brian Baker [PR] (New Zealand) Marcus Daniell [PR]	6–3, 7–6^{(9–7)}
Colored background indicates a night match
Matches start at 11am, night session starts at 7pm Eastern Daylight Time (EDT)

== Day 9 (September 6) ==
- Seeds out:
  - Men's singles: (France) Jo-Wilfried Tsonga [9], (France) Lucas Pouille [24]
  - Women's singles: (Italy) Roberta Vinci [7]
  - Men's doubles: (United States) Bob Bryan / (United States) Mike Bryan [3]
  - Women's doubles: (India) Sania Mirza / (Czech Republic) Barbora Strýcová [7], (Slovenia) Andreja Klepač / (Slovenia) Katarina Srebotnik [13]
  - Mixed doubles: (Kazakhstan) Yaroslava Shvedova / (Brazil) Bruno Soares [2]
- Schedule of Play

Matches on main courts
Matches on Arthur Ashe Stadium
Event	Winner	Loser	Score
Women's singles - Quarterfinals	(Germany) Angelique Kerber [2]	(Italy) Roberta Vinci [7]	7–5, 6–0
Men's singles - Quarterfinals	(France) Gaël Monfils [10]	(France) Lucas Pouille [24]	6–4, 6–3, 6–3
Women's singles - Quarterfinals	(Denmark) Caroline Wozniacki	(Latvia) Anastasija Sevastova	6–0, 6–2
Men's singles - Quarterfinals	(Serbia) Novak Djokovic [1]	(France) Jo-Wilfried Tsonga [9]	6–3, 6–2, retired
Matches on Louis Armstrong Stadium
Event	Winner	Loser	Score
Women's doubles - Quarterfinals	(United States) Bethanie Mattek-Sands [12] (Czech Republic) Lucie Šafářová [12]	(United States) Asia Muhammad [WC] (United States) Taylor Townsend [WC]	6–1, 6–2
Women's doubles - Quarterfinals	(Russia) Ekaterina Makarova [5] (Russia) Elena Vesnina [5]	(Slovenia) Andreja Klepač [13] (Slovenia) Katarina Srebotnik [13]	6–4, 6–2
Men's doubles - Quarterfinals	(Spain) Feliciano López [8] (Spain) Marc López [8]	(United States) Bob Bryan [3] (United States) Mike Bryan [3]	7–6^{(7–2)}, 4–6, 6–3
Matches on Grandstand
Event	Winner	Loser	Score
Mixed doubles - Quarterfinals	(Germany) Laura Siegemund [13] (Croatia) Mate Pavić [13]	(United States) Nicole Gibbs [WC] (United States) Dennis Novikov [WC]	6–2, 7–6^{(7–2)}
Mixed doubles - Quarterfinals	(Chinese Taipei) Chan Yung-jan (Serbia) Nenad Zimonjić	(Kazakhstan) Yaroslava Shvedova [2] (Brazil) Bruno Soares [2]	1–6, 6–3, [13–11]
Women's doubles - Quarterfinals	(France) Caroline Garcia [1] (France) Kristina Mladenovic [1]	(India) Sania Mirza [7] (Czech Republic) Barbora Strýcová [7]	7–6^{(7–3)}, 6–1
Colored background indicates a night match
Matches start at 11am, night session starts at 7pm Eastern Daylight Time (EDT)

== Day 10 (September 7) ==
- Seeds out:
  - Men's singles: (United Kingdom) Andy Murray [2]
  - Women's singles: (Romania) Simona Halep [5]
  - Men's doubles: (Poland) Łukasz Kubot / (Austria) Alexander Peya [12]
  - Women's doubles: (Czech Republic) Barbora Krejčíková / (Czech Republic) Kateřina Siniaková [16]
- Schedule of Play

Matches on main courts
Matches on Arthur Ashe Stadium
Event	Winner	Loser	Score
Women's singles - Quarterfinals	(Czech Republic) Karolína Plíšková [10]	(Croatia) Ana Konjuh	6–2, 6–2
Men's singles - Quarterfinals	(Japan) Kei Nishikori [6]	(United Kingdom) Andy Murray [2]	1–6, 6–4, 4–6, 6–1, 7–5
Women's singles - Quarterfinals	(United States) Serena Williams [1]	(Romania) Simona Halep [5]	6–2, 4–6, 6–3
Men's singles - Quarterfinals	(Switzerland) Stan Wawrinka [3]	(Argentina) Juan Martín del Potro [WC]	7–6^{(7–5)}, 4–6, 6–3, 6–2
Matches on Grandstand
Event	Winner	Loser	Score
Women's doubles - Quarterfinals	(Switzerland) Martina Hingis [6] (United States) CoCo Vandeweghe [6]	(Czech Republic) Barbora Krejčíková [16] (Czech Republic) Kateřina Siniaková [16]	6–1, 6–2
Men's doubles - Quarterfinals	(France) Pierre-Hugues Herbert [1] (France) Nicolas Mahut [1]	(Sweden) Robert Lindstedt (Pakistan) Aisam-ul-Haq Qureshi	6–3, 7–6^{(7–4)}
Mixed doubles - Semifinals	(United States) CoCo Vandeweghe [7] (United States) Rajeev Ram [7]	(Germany) Anna-Lena Grönefeld (Colombia) Robert Farah	7–6^{(7–4)}, 6–4
Colored background indicates a night match
Matches start at 11am, night session starts at 7pm Eastern Daylight Time (EDT)

== Day 11 (September 8) ==
- Seeds out:
  - Women's singles: (United States) Serena Williams [1]
  - Men's doubles: (France) Pierre-Hugues Herbert / (France) Nicolas Mahut [1], (Spain) Feliciano López / (Spain) Marc López [8]
  - Women's doubles: (Russia) Ekaterina Makarova / (Russia) Elena Vesnina [5], (Switzerland) Martina Hingis / (United States) CoCo Vandeweghe [6]
- Schedule of Play

Matches on main courts
Matches on Arthur Ashe Stadium
Event	Winner	Loser	Score
Women's singles - Semifinals	(Czech Republic) Karolína Plíšková [10]	(United States) Serena Williams [1]	6–2, 7–6^{(7–5)}
Women's singles - Semifinals	(Germany) Angelique Kerber [2]	(Denmark) Caroline Wozniacki	6–4, 6–3
Matches on Grandstand
Event	Winner	Loser	Score
Women's doubles - Semifinals	(United States) Bethanie Mattek-Sands [12] (Czech Republic) Lucie Šafářová [12]	(Russia) Ekaterina Makarova [5] (Russia) Elena Vesnina [5]	6–2, 7–6^{(7–4)}
Women's doubles - Semifinals	(France) Caroline Garcia [1] (France) Kristina Mladenovic [1]	(Switzerland) Martina Hingis [6] (United States) CoCo Vandeweghe [6]	6–3, 6–4
Men's doubles - Semifinals	(United Kingdom) Jamie Murray [4] (Brazil) Bruno Soares [4]	(France) Pierre-Hugues Herbert [1] (France) Nicolas Mahut [1]	7–5, 4–6, 6–3
Men's doubles - Semifinals	(Spain) Pablo Carreño Busta (Spain) Guillermo García López	(Spain) Feliciano López [8] (Spain) Marc López [8]	6–3, 7–6^{(7–4)}
Colored background indicates a night match
Matches start at 12pm, night session starts at 7pm Eastern Daylight Time (EDT)

== Day 12 (September 9) ==
- Seeds out:
  - Men's singles: (Japan) Kei Nishikori [6], (France) Gaël Monfils [10]
  - Mixed doubles: (United States) CoCo Vandeweghe / (United States) Rajeev Ram [7]
- Schedule of Play

Matches on main courts
Matches on Arthur Ashe Stadium
Event	Winner	Loser	Score
Mixed doubles - Final	(Germany) Laura Siegemund (Croatia) Mate Pavić	(United States) CoCo Vandeweghe [7] (United States) Rajeev Ram [7]	6–4, 6–4
Men's singles - Semifinals	(Serbia) Novak Djokovic [1]	(France) Gaël Monfils [10]	6–3, 6–2, 3–6, 6–2
Men's singles - Semifinals	(Switzerland) Stan Wawrinka [3]	(Japan) Kei Nishikori [6]	4–6, 7–5, 6–4, 6–2
Matches start at 12pm Eastern Daylight Time (EDT)

== Day 13 (September 10) ==
- Seeds out:
  - Women's singles: (Czech Republic) Karolína Plíšková [10]
- Schedule of Play

Matches on main courts
Matches on Arthur Ashe Stadium
Event	Winner	Loser	Score
Men's doubles - Final	(United Kingdom) Jamie Murray [4] (Brazil) Bruno Soares [4]	(Spain) Pablo Carreño Busta (Spain) Guillermo García López	6–2, 6–3
Women's singles - Final	(Germany) Angelique Kerber [2]	(Czech Republic) Karolína Plíšková [10]	6–3, 4–6, 6–4
Matches start at 12pm Eastern Daylight Time (EDT)

== Day 14 (September 11) ==
- Seeds out:
  - Men's singles: (Serbia) Novak Djokovic [1]
  - Women's doubles: (France) Caroline Garcia / (France) Kristina Mladenovic [1]
- Schedule of Play

Matches on main courts
Matches on Arthur Ashe Stadium
Event	Winner	Loser	Score
Women's doubles - Final	(United States) Bethanie Mattek-Sands [12] (Czech Republic) Lucie Šafářová [12]	(France) Caroline Garcia [1] (France) Kristina Mladenovic [1]	2–6, 7–6^{(7–5)}, 6–4
Men's singles - Final	(Switzerland) Stan Wawrinka [3]	(Serbia) Novak Djokovic [1]	6–7^{(1–7)}, 6–4, 7–5, 6–3
Matches start at 12pm Eastern Daylight Time (EDT)
