= 2017 US Open – Day-by-day summaries =

This is a list of day-by-day summaries of the 2017 US Open.

== Day 1 (August 28) ==
- Seeds out:
  - Men's Singles: (United States) Jack Sock [13], (Spain) David Ferrer [21], (Russia) Karen Khachanov [25], (Netherlands) Robin Haase [32]
  - Women's Singles: (Romania) Simona Halep [2], (United Kingdom) Johanna Konta [7], (Croatia) Ana Konjuh [21], (Netherlands) Kiki Bertens [24], (United States) Lauren Davis [32]
- Schedule of Play

Matches on main courts
Matches on Arthur Ashe Stadium
Event	Winner	Loser	Score
Women's Singles 1st Round	(Spain) Garbiñe Muguruza [3]	(United States) Varvara Lepchenko	6–0, 6–3
Men's Singles 1st Round	(Croatia) Marin Čilić [5]	(United States) Tennys Sandgren	6–4, 6–3, 3–6, 6–3
Women's Singles 1st Round	(United States) Venus Williams [9]	(Slovakia) Viktória Kužmová [Q]	6–3, 3–6, 6–2
2017 US Open Opening Night Ceremony
Women's Singles 1st Round	(Russia) Maria Sharapova [WC]	(Romania) Simona Halep [2]	6–4, 4–6, 6–3
Men's Singles 1st Round	(Germany) Alexander Zverev [4]	(Barbados) Darian King [Q]	7–6^{(11–9)}, 7–5, 6–4
Matches on Louis Armstrong Stadium
Event	Winner	Loser	Score
Women's Singles 1st Round	(Czech Republic) Petra Kvitová [13]	(Serbia) Jelena Janković	7–5, 7–5
Men's Singles 1st Round	(United States) John Isner [10]	(France) Pierre-Hugues Herbert	6–1, 6–3, 4–6, 6–3
Women's Singles 1st Round	(United States) Sloane Stephens [PR]	(Italy) Roberta Vinci	7–5, 6–1
Men's Singles 1st Round	(Australia) Jordan Thompson	(United States) Jack Sock [13]	6–2, 7–6^{(14–12)}, 1–6, 5–7, 6–4
Matches on Grandstand
Event	Winner	Loser	Score
Men's Singles 1st Round	(United States) Steve Johnson	(Spain) Nicolás Almagro	6–4, 7–6^{(7–2)}, 7–6^{(7–5)}
Women's Singles 1st Round	(Serbia) Aleksandra Krunić	(United Kingdom) Johanna Konta [7]	4–6, 6–3, 6–4
Men's Singles 1st Round	(United States) Sam Querrey [17]	(France) Gilles Simon	6–4, 6–3, 6–4
Women's Singles 1st Round	(Denmark) Caroline Wozniacki [5]	(Romania) Mihaela Buzărnescu [Q]	6–1, 7–5
Colored background indicates a night match
Matches start at 11am, night session starts at 7pm Eastern Daylight Time (EDT)

== Day 2 (August 29) ==
- Seeds out:
  - Women's Singles: (Germany) Angelique Kerber [6], (Ukraine) Lesia Tsurenko [28]
- Schedule of Play

Matches on main courts
Matches on Arthur Ashe Stadium
Event	Winner	Loser	Score
Women's Singles 1st Round	(Czech Republic) Karolína Plíšková [1]	(Poland) Magda Linette	6–2, 6–1
Women's Singles 1st Round	(Japan) Naomi Osaka	(Germany) Angelique Kerber [6]	6–3, 6–1
Men's Singles 1st Round	(Spain) Rafael Nadal [1]	(Serbia) Dušan Lajović	7–6^{(8–6)}, 6–2, 6–2
Women's Singles 1st Round	(Latvia) Jeļena Ostapenko [12]	(Spain) Lara Arruabarrena	6–2, 1–6, 6–1 (Note: This match started on Court 17, as planned, but with Ostapenko leading 3–1 in the final set, the match was suspended due to rain. The match moved to Arthur Ashe Stadium following the conclusion of the Nadal-Lajovic match, where it was finished the same day.)
Women's Singles 1st Round	(United States) Madison Keys [15]	(Belgium) Elise Mertens	6–3, 7–6^{(8–6)}
Men's Singles 1st Round	(Switzerland) Roger Federer [3]	(United States) Frances Tiafoe	4–6, 6–2, 6–1, 1–6, 6–4
Matches on Louis Armstrong Stadium
Event	Winner	Loser	Score
Women's Singles 1st Round	(Ukraine) Elina Svitolina [4] vs (Czech Republic) Kateřina Siniaková		6–0, 6–6^{(2–6)}, suspended
Matches on Grandstand
Event	Winner	Loser	Score
Men's Singles 1st Round	(Australia) Alex De Minaur [WC] vs (Austria) Dominic Thiem [6]		4–6, 1–6, 0–1, suspended
Colored background indicates a night match
Matches start at 11am, night session starts at 7pm Eastern Daylight Time (EDT)

== Day 3 (August 30) ==
- Seeds out:
  - Men's Singles: (Germany) Alexander Zverev [4], (France) Jo-Wilfried Tsonga [8], (Australia) Nick Kyrgios [14], (Luxembourg) Gilles Müller [19], (Spain) Albert Ramos Viñolas [20], (Italy) Fabio Fognini [22], (France) Richard Gasquet [26], (Uruguay) Pablo Cuevas [27]
  - Women's Singles: (Denmark) Caroline Wozniacki [5], (Slovakia) Dominika Cibulková [11], (France) Kristina Mladenovic [14], (Russia) Anastasia Pavlyuchenkova [19], (China) Peng Shuai [22], (Estonia) Anett Kontaveit [26], (Croatia) Mirjana Lučić-Baroni [29]
- Schedule of Play

Matches on main courts
Matches on Arthur Ashe Stadium
Event	Winner	Loser	Score
Women's Singles 1st Round	(Russia) Evgeniya Rodina	(Canada) Eugenie Bouchard	7–6^{(7–2)}, 6–1
Men's Singles 1st Round	(Argentina) Juan Martín del Potro [24]	(Switzerland) Henri Laaksonen	6–4, 7–6^{(7–3)}, 7–6^{(7–5)}
Women's Singles 2nd Round	(Russia) Maria Sharapova [WC]	(Hungary) Tímea Babos	6–7^{(4–7)}, 6–4, 6–1
Women's Singles 2nd Round	(United States) Venus Williams [9]	(France) Océane Dodin	7–5, 6–4
Men's Singles 2nd Round	(Canada) Denis Shapovalov [Q]	(France) Jo-Wilfried Tsonga [8]	6–4, 6–4, 7–6^{(7–3)}
Matches on Louis Armstrong Stadium
Event	Winner	Loser	Score
Women's Singles 1st Round	(Ukraine) Elina Svitolina [4]	(Czech Republic) Kateřina Siniaková	6–0, 6–7^{(5–7)}, 6–3
Men's Singles 1st Round	(Australia) John Millman [PR]	(Australia) Nick Kyrgios [14]	6–3, 1–6, 6–4, 6–1
Women's Singles 1st Round	(United States) CoCo Vandeweghe [20]	(United States) Alison Riske	2–6, 6–3, 6–4
Men's Singles 2nd Round	(United States) John Isner [10]	(South Korea) Chung Hyeon	6–3, 6–4, 7–5
Men's Singles 2nd Round	(United Kingdom) Kyle Edmund	(United States) Steve Johnson	7–5, 6–2, 7–6^{(7–4)}
Matches on Grandstand
Event	Winner	Loser	Score
Men's Singles 1st Round	(Austria) Dominic Thiem [6]	(Australia) Alex De Minaur [WC]	6–4, 6–1, 6–1
Men's Singles 1st Round	(Bulgaria) Grigor Dimitrov [7]	(Czech Republic) Václav Šafránek [Q]	6–1, 6–4, 6–2
Women's Singles 1st Round	(Russia) Svetlana Kuznetsova [8]	(Czech Republic) Markéta Vondroušová	4–6, 6–4, 7–6^{(7–2)}
Women's Singles 1st Round	(Australia) Daria Gavrilova [25]	(United States) Allie Kiick [Q]	6–2, 6–1
Men's Singles 2nd Round	(Croatia) Borna Ćorić	(Germany) Alexander Zverev [4]	3–6, 7–5, 7–6^{(7–1)}, 7–6^{(7–4)}
Women's Singles 2nd Round	(Spain) Garbiñe Muguruza [3]	(China) Duan Yingying	6–4, 6–0
Colored background indicates a night match
Matches start at 11am, night session starts at 7pm Eastern Daylight Time (EDT)

== Day 4 (August 31) ==
- Seeds out:
  - Men's Singles: (Bulgaria) Grigor Dimitrov [7], (Czech Republic) Tomáš Berdych [15]
  - Women's Singles: (Russia) Svetlana Kuznetsova [8], (Czech Republic) Barbora Strýcová [23], (Australia) Daria Gavrilova [25]
  - Men's Doubles: (South Africa) Raven Klaasen / (United States) Rajeev Ram [7], (United States) Ryan Harrison / (New Zealand) Michael Venus [8]
  - Women's Doubles: (Germany) Anna-Lena Grönefeld / (Czech Republic) Květa Peschke [8], (United States) Abigail Spears / (Slovenia) Katarina Srebotnik [10], (Japan) Makoto Ninomiya / (Czech Republic) Renata Voráčová [15]
- Schedule of Play

Matches on main courts
Matches on Arthur Ashe Stadium
Event	Winner	Loser	Score
Women's Singles 2nd Round	(Ukraine) Elina Svitolina [4]	(Russia) Evgeniya Rodina	6–4, 6–4
Women's Singles 2nd Round	(Czech Republic) Karolína Plíšková [1]	(United States) Nicole Gibbs [Q]	2–6, 6–3, 6–4
Men's Singles 2nd Round	(Switzerland) Roger Federer [3]	(Russia) Mikhail Youzhny	6–1, 6–7^{(3–7)}, 4–6, 6–4, 6–2
Women's Singles 2nd Round	(United States) CoCo Vandeweghe [20]	(Tunisia) Ons Jabeur	7–6^{(8–6)}, 6–2
Men's Singles 2nd Round	(Spain) Rafael Nadal [1]	(Japan) Taro Daniel	4–6, 6–3, 6–2, 6–2
Matches on Louis Armstrong Stadium
Event	Winner	Loser	Score
Women's Singles 2nd Round	(Latvia) Jeļena Ostapenko [12]	(Romania) Sorana Cîrstea	6–4, 6–4
Men's Singles 2nd Round	(Russia) Andrey Rublev	(Bulgaria) Grigor Dimitrov [7]	7–5, 7–6^{(7–3)}, 6–3
Men's Singles 2nd Round	(Austria) Dominic Thiem [6]	(United States) Taylor Fritz [WC]	6–4, 6–4, 4–6, 7–5
Women's Singles 2nd Round	(United States) Madison Keys [15]	(Germany) Tatjana Maria	6–3, 6–4
Matches on Grandstand
Event	Winner	Loser	Score
Women's Singles 2nd Round	(United States) Jennifer Brady	(Czech Republic) Barbora Strýcová [23]	6–1, 6–1
Men's Singles 2nd Round	(Argentina) Juan Martín del Potro [24]	(Spain) Adrián Menéndez-Maceiras [Q]	6–2, 6–3, 7–6^{(7–3)}
Men's Singles 2nd Round	(France) Gaël Monfils [18]	(United States) Donald Young	6–3, 6–7^{(3–7)}, 6–4, 2–6, 7–5
Women's Singles 2nd Round	(Japan) Kurumi Nara	(Russia) Svetlana Kuznetsova [8]	6–3, 3–6, 6–3
Colored background indicates a night match
Matches start at 11am, night session starts at 7pm Eastern Daylight Time (EDT)

== Day 5 (September 1) ==
- Seeds out:
  - Men's Singles: (Croatia) Marin Čilić [5], (United States) John Isner [10]
  - Women's Singles: (France) Caroline Garcia [18], (Slovakia) Magdaléna Rybáriková [31]
  - Men's Doubles: (Poland) Łukasz Kubot / (Brazil) Marcelo Melo [2], (France) Pierre-Hugues Herbert / (France) Nicolas Mahut [3], (India) Rohan Bopanna / (Uruguay) Pablo Cuevas [10], (United States) Brian Baker / (Croatia) Nikola Mektić [13], (Mexico) Santiago González / (United States) Donald Young [15], (Australia) Sam Groth / (Pakistan) Aisam-ul-Haq Qureshi [16]
  - Mixed Doubles: (India) Sania Mirza / (Croatia) Ivan Dodig [2], (Australia) Casey Dellacqua / (United States) Rajeev Ram [5], (Czech Republic) Andrea Hlaváčková / (France) Édouard Roger-Vasselin [6]
- Schedule of Play

Matches on main courts
Matches on Arthur Ashe Stadium
Event	Winner	Loser	Score
Women's Singles 3rd Round	(Czech Republic) Petra Kvitová [13]	(France) Caroline Garcia [18]	6–0, 6–4
Men's Singles 3rd Round	(Canada) Denis Shapovalov [Q]	(United Kingdom) Kyle Edmund	3–6, 6–3, 6–3, 1–0, retired
Women's Singles 3rd Round	(United States) Venus Williams [9]	(Greece) Maria Sakkari	6–3, 6–4
Men's Singles 3rd Round	(Germany) Mischa Zverev [23]	(United States) John Isner [10]	6–4, 6–3, 7–6^{(7–5)}
Women's Singles 3rd Round	(Russia) Maria Sharapova [WC]	(United States) Sofia Kenin [WC]	7–5, 6–2
Matches on Louis Armstrong Stadium
Event	Winner	Loser	Score
Men's Singles 3rd Round	(Spain) Pablo Carreño Busta [12]	(France) Nicolas Mahut [Q]	6–3, 6–4, 6–3
Women's Singles 3rd Round	(United States) Sloane Stephens [PR]	(Australia) Ashleigh Barty	6–2, 6–4
Women's Singles 3rd Round	(Spain) Garbiñe Muguruza [3]	(Slovakia) Magdaléna Rybáriková [31]	6–1, 6–1
Men's Singles 3rd Round	(United States) Sam Querrey [17]	(Moldova) Radu Albot [Q]	4–6, 6–2, 6–4, 6–4
Matches on Grandstand
Event	Winner	Loser	Score
Men's Singles 3rd Round	(Argentina) Diego Schwartzman [29]	(Croatia) Marin Čilić [5]	4–6, 7–5, 7–5, 6–4
Men's Singles 3rd Round	(South Africa) Kevin Anderson [28]	(Croatia) Borna Ćorić	6–4, 6–3, 6–2
Women's Doubles 1st Round	(Chinese Taipei) Chan Yung-jan [2] (Switzerland) Martina Hingis [2]	(Kazakhstan) Yulia Putintseva (Australia) Arina Rodionova	6–2, 6–2
Women's Singles 3rd Round	(Latvia) Anastasija Sevastova [16]	(Croatia) Donna Vekić	6–2, 6–3
Colored background indicates a night match
Matches start at 11am, night session starts at 7pm Eastern Daylight Time (EDT)

== Day 6 (September 2) ==
- Seeds out:
  - Men's Singles: (Spain) Roberto Bautista Agut [11], (France) Gaël Monfils [18], (France) Adrian Mannarino [30], (Spain) Feliciano López [31]
  - Women's Singles: (Poland) Agnieszka Radwańska [10], (Latvia) Jeļena Ostapenko [12], (Russia) Elena Vesnina [17], (China) Zhang Shuai [27]
  - Women's Doubles: (Australia) Ashleigh Barty / (Australia) Casey Dellacqua [6], (Japan) Nao Hibino / (Poland) Alicja Rosolska [16]
- Schedule of Play

Matches on main courts
Matches on Arthur Ashe Stadium
Event	Winner	Loser	Score
Women's Singles 3rd Round	(Czech Republic) Karolína Plíšková [1]	(China) Zhang Shuai [27]	3–6, 7–5, 6–4
Women's Singles 3rd Round	(United States) CoCo Vandeweghe [20]	(Poland) Agnieszka Radwańska [10]	7–5, 4–6, 6–4
Men's Singles 3rd Round	(Spain) Rafael Nadal [1]	(Argentina) Leonardo Mayer [LL]	6–7^{(3–7)}, 6–3, 6–1, 6–4
Men's Singles 3rd Round	(Switzerland) Roger Federer [3]	(Spain) Feliciano López [31]	6–3, 6–3, 7–5
Women's Singles 3rd Round	(United States) Madison Keys [15]	(Russia) Elena Vesnina [17]	2–6, 6–4, 6–1
Matches on Louis Armstrong Stadium
Event	Winner	Loser	Score
Men's Singles 3rd Round	(Austria) Dominic Thiem [6]	(France) Adrian Mannarino [30]	7–5, 6–3, 6–4
Women's Singles 3rd Round	(Russia) Daria Kasatkina	(Latvia) Jeļena Ostapenko [12]	6–3, 6–2
Men's Singles 3rd Round	(Belgium) David Goffin [9]	(France) Gaël Monfils [18]	7–5, 5–1, retired
Men's Doubles 2nd Round	(France) Jérémy Chardy / (France) Fabrice Martin vs. (United States) Taylor Fritz / (United States) Reilly Opelka [WC]		6–2, 6–7^{(3–7)}, suspended
Matches on Grandstand
Event	Winner	Loser	Score
Men's Singles 3rd Round	(Ukraine) Alexandr Dolgopolov	(Serbia) Viktor Troicki	6–1, 6–0, 6–4
Men's Singles 3rd Round	(Argentina) Juan Martín del Potro [24]	(Spain) Roberto Bautista Agut [11]	6–3, 6–3, 6–4
Women's Singles 3rd Round	(Ukraine) Elina Svitolina [4]	(United States) Shelby Rogers	6–4, 7–5
Men's Doubles 2nd Round	(United States) Bob Bryan [5] (United States) Mike Bryan [5]	(Australia) Nick Kyrgios (Australia) Matt Reid	6–1, 6–1
Colored background indicates a night match
Matches start at 11am, night session starts at 7pm Eastern Daylight Time (EDT)

== Day 7 (September 3) ==
- Seeds out:
  - Men's Singles: (France) Lucas Pouille [16], (Germany) Mischa Zverev [23]
  - Women's Singles: (Spain) Garbiñe Muguruza [3], (Germany) Julia Görges [30]
  - Men's Doubles: (Croatia) Ivan Dodig / (Spain) Marcel Granollers [6], (Chile) Julio Peralta / (Argentina) Horacio Zeballos [14]
  - Women's Doubles: (France) Kristina Mladenovic / (Russia) Anastasia Pavlyuchenkova [13]
- Schedule of Play

Matches on main courts
Matches on Arthur Ashe Stadium
Event	Winner	Loser	Score
Men's Singles 4th Round	(Spain) Pablo Carreño Busta [12]	(Canada) Denis Shapovalov [Q]	7–6^{(7–2)}, 7–6^{(7–4)}, 7–6^{(7–3)}
Women's Singles 4th Round	(Latvia) Anastasija Sevastova [16]	(Russia) Maria Sharapova [WC]	5–7, 6–4, 6–2
Women's Singles 4th Round	(United States) Venus Williams [9]	(Spain) Carla Suárez Navarro	6–3, 3–6, 6–1
Women's Singles 4th Round	(Czech Republic) Petra Kvitová [13]	(Spain) Garbiñe Muguruza [3]	7–6^{(7–3)}, 6–3
Men's Singles 4th Round	(United States) Sam Querrey [17]	(Germany) Mischa Zverev [23]	6–2, 6–2, 6–1
Matches on Louis Armstrong Stadium
Event	Winner	Loser	Score
Men's Doubles 2nd Round	(France) Jérémy Chardy (France) Fabrice Martin	(United States) Taylor Fritz [WC] (United States) Reilly Opelka [WC]	6–2, 6–7^{(3–7)}, 7–6^{(7–5)}
Women's Singles 4th Round	(United States) Sloane Stephens [PR]	(Germany) Julia Görges [30]	6–3, 3–6, 6–1
Men's Singles 4th Round	(South Africa) Kevin Anderson [28]	(Italy) Paolo Lorenzi	6–4, 6–3, 6–7^{(4–7)}, 6–4
Matches on Grandstand
Event	Winner	Loser	Score
Men's Doubles 2nd Round	(Finland) Henri Kontinen [1] (Australia) John Peers [1]	(Russia) Mikhail Elgin (Russia) Daniil Medvedev	7–6^{(7–3)}, 6–4
Men's Singles 4th Round	(Argentina) Diego Schwartzman [29]	(France) Lucas Pouille [16]	7–6^{(7–3)}, 7–5, 2–6, 6–2
Women's Doubles 3rd Round	(India) Sania Mirza [4] (China) Peng Shuai [4]	(Romania) Sorana Cîrstea (Spain) Sara Sorribes Tormo	6–2, 3–6, 7–6^{(7–2)}
Mixed Doubles 2nd Round	(Australia) Anastasia Rodionova (Austria) Oliver Marach	(Latvia) Jeļena Ostapenko (France) Fabrice Martin	6–4, 6–2
Colored background indicates a night match
Matches start at 11am, night session starts at 7pm Eastern Daylight Time (EDT)

== Day 8 (September 4) ==
- Seeds out:
  - Men's Singles: (Austria) Dominic Thiem [6], (Belgium) David Goffin [9], (Germany) Philipp Kohlschreiber [33]
  - Women's Singles: (Ukraine) Elina Svitolina [4]
  - Men's Doubles: (Austria) Oliver Marach / (Croatia) Mate Pavić [9]
  - Women's Doubles: (Russia) Ekaterina Makarova / (Russia) Elena Vesnina [1], (Netherlands) Kiki Bertens / (Sweden) Johanna Larsson [11], (Chinese Taipei) Hsieh Su-wei / (Romania) Monica Niculescu [12]
  - Mixed Doubles: (Canada) Gabriela Dabrowski / (India) Rohan Bopanna [7]
- Schedule of Play

Matches on main courts
Matches on Arthur Ashe Stadium
Event	Winner	Loser	Score
Women's Singles 4th Round	(Czech Republic) Karolína Plíšková [1]	(United States) Jennifer Brady	6–1, 6–0
Men's Singles 4th Round	(Spain) Rafael Nadal [1]	(Ukraine) Alexandr Dolgopolov	6–2, 6–4, 6–1
Women's Singles 4th Round	(United States) CoCo Vandeweghe [20]	(Czech Republic) Lucie Šafářová	6–4, 7–6^{(7–2)}
Men's Singles 4th Round	(Switzerland) Roger Federer [3]	(Germany) Philipp Kohlschreiber [33]	6–4, 6–2, 7–5
Women's Singles 4th Round	(United States) Madison Keys [15]	(Ukraine) Elina Svitolina [4]	7–6^{(7–2)}, 1–6, 6–4
Matches on Louis Armstrong Stadium
Event	Winner	Loser	Score
Men's Doubles 3rd Round	(Netherlands) Robin Haase (Netherlands) Matwé Middelkoop	(Israel) Dudi Sela (Belgium) Steve Darcis	7–6^{(7–2)}, 6–3
Men's Singles 4th Round	(Russia) Andrey Rublev	(Belgium) David Goffin [9]	7–5, 7–6^{(7–5)}, 6–3
Women's Singles 4th Round	(Estonia) Kaia Kanepi [Q]	(Russia) Daria Kasatkina	6–4, 6–4
Men's Doubles 3rd Round	(United Kingdom) Jamie Murray [4] (Brazil) Bruno Soares [4]	(Sweden) Robert Lindstedt (Australia) Jordan Thompson	6–3, 6–4
Matches on Grandstand
Event	Winner	Loser	Score
Men's Doubles 3rd Round	(Finland) Henri Kontinen [1] (Australia) John Peers [1]	(Colombia) Juan Sebastián Cabal (Argentina) Leonardo Mayer	6–3, 6–4
Men's Doubles 3rd Round	(United States) Bob Bryan [5] (United States) Mike Bryan [5]	(Austria) Oliver Marach [9] (Croatia) Mate Pavić [9]	4–6, 6–3, 6–4
Men's Singles 4th Round	(Argentina) Juan Martín del Potro [24]	(Austria) Dominic Thiem [6]	1–6, 2–6, 6–1, 7–6^{(7–1)}, 6–4
Colored background indicates a night match
Matches start at 11am, night session starts at 7pm Eastern Daylight Time (EDT)

== Day 9 (September 5) ==
- Seeds out:
  - Men's Singles: (United States) Sam Querrey [17], (Argentina) Diego Schwartzman [29]
  - Women's Singles: (Czech Republic) Petra Kvitová [13], (Latvia) Anastasija Sevastova [16]
  - Men's Doubles: (United Kingdom) Jamie Murray / (Brazil) Bruno Soares [4]
  - Women's Doubles: (Slovenia) Andreja Klepač / (Spain) María José Martínez Sánchez [14]
  - Mixed Doubles: (Hungary) Tímea Babos / (Brazil) Bruno Soares [4], (Czech Republic) Lucie Hradecká / (Poland) Marcin Matkowski [8]
- Schedule of Play

Matches on main courts
Matches on Arthur Ashe Stadium
Event	Winner	Loser	Score
Men's Singles Quarterfinals	(Spain) Pablo Carreño Busta [12]	(Argentina) Diego Schwartzman [29]	6–4, 6–4, 6–2
Women's Singles Quarterfinals	(United States) Sloane Stephens [PR]	(Latvia) Anastasija Sevastova [16]	6–3, 3–6, 7–6^{(7–4)}
Women's Singles Quarterfinals	(United States) Venus Williams [9]	(Czech Republic) Petra Kvitová [13]	6–3, 3–6, 7–6^{(7–2)}
Men's Singles Quarterfinals	(South Africa) Kevin Anderson [28]	(United States) Sam Querrey [17]	7–6^{(7–5)}, 6–7^{(9–11)}, 6–3, 7–6^{(9–7)}
Matches on Louis Armstrong Stadium
Event	Winner	Loser	Score
Men's Doubles Quarterfinals	(Finland) Henri Kontinen [1] (Australia) John Peers [1]	(United States) Nicholas Monroe (Australia) John-Patrick Smith	6–3, 6–4
Men's Doubles Quarterfinals	(Spain) Feliciano López [11] (Spain) Marc López [11]	(Netherlands) Robin Haase (Netherlands) Matwé Middelkoop	6–4, 7–5
Mixed Doubles Quarterfinals	(Australia) Anastasia Rodionova (Austria) Oliver Marach	(Czech Republic) Lucie Hradecká [8] (Poland) Marcin Matkowski [8]	5–7, 6–4, [10–8]
Mixed Doubles Quarterfinals	(Switzerland) Martina Hingis [1] (United Kingdom) Jamie Murray [1]	(United States) Abigail Spears (Colombia) Juan Sebastián Cabal	6–3, 2–6, [10–8]
Matches on Grandstand
Event	Winner	Loser	Score
Women's Doubles Quarterfinals	(Czech Republic) Lucie Hradecká [7] (Czech Republic) Kateřina Siniaková [7]	(Slovenia) Andreja Klepač [14] (Spain) María José Martínez Sánchez [14]	7–6^{(7–2)}, 6–3
Men's Doubles Quarterfinals	(Netherlands) Jean-Julien Rojer [12] (Romania) Horia Tecău [12]	(United Kingdom) Jamie Murray [4] (Brazil) Bruno Soares [4]	6–1, 6–2
Men's Doubles Quarterfinals	(United States) Bob Bryan [5] (United States) Mike Bryan [5]	(France) Julien Benneteau (France) Édouard Roger-Vasselin	6–3, 7–5
Mixed Doubles Quarterfinals	(United States) Coco Vandeweghe (Romania) Horia Tecău	(Hungary) Tímea Babos [4] (Brazil) Bruno Soares [4]	4–6, 6–1, [10–8]
Colored background indicates a night match
Matches start at 11am, night session starts at 7pm Eastern Daylight Time (EDT)

== Day 10 (September 6) ==
- Seeds out:
  - Men's Singles: (Switzerland) Roger Federer [3]
  - Women's Singles: (Czech Republic) Karolína Plíšková [1]
  - Women's Doubles: (Canada) Gabriela Dabrowski / (China) Xu Yifan [9]
- Schedule of Play

Matches on main courts
Matches on Arthur Ashe Stadium
Event	Winner	Loser	Score
Women's Singles Quarterfinals	(United States) CoCo Vandeweghe [20]	(Czech Republic) Karolína Plíšková [1]	7–6^{(7–4)}, 6–3
Men's Singles Quarterfinals	(Spain) Rafael Nadal [1]	(Russia) Andrey Rublev	6–1, 6–2, 6–2
Women's Doubles Quarterfinals	(Czech Republic) Lucie Šafářová [3] (Czech Republic) Barbora Strýcová [3]	(Canada) Gabriela Dabrowski [9] (China) Xu Yifan [9]	6–3, 2–6, 6–4
Women's Singles Quarterfinals	(United States) Madison Keys [15]	(Estonia) Kaia Kanepi [Q]	6–3, 6–3
Men's Singles Quarterfinals	(Argentina) Juan Martín del Potro [24]	(Switzerland) Roger Federer [3]	7–5, 3–6, 7–6^{(10–8)}, 6–4
Colored background indicates a night match
Matches start at 12pm, night session starts at 7pm Eastern Daylight Time (EDT)

== Day 11 (September 7) ==
- Seeds out:
  - Women's Singles: (United States) Venus Williams [9], (United States) CoCo Vandeweghe [20]
  - Men's Doubles: (Finland) Henri Kontinen / (Australia) John Peers [1], (United States) Bob Bryan / (United States) Mike Bryan [5]
  - Women's Doubles: (Hungary) Tímea Babos / (Czech Republic) Andrea Hlaváčková [5]
- Schedule of Play

Matches on main courts
Matches on Arthur Ashe Stadium
Event	Winner	Loser	Score
Women's Singles Semifinals	(United States) Sloane Stephens [PR]	(United States) Venus Williams [9]	6–1, 0–6, 7–5
Women's Singles Semifinals	(United States) Madison Keys [15]	(United States) CoCo Vandeweghe [20]	6–1, 6–2
Matches on Louis Armstrong Stadium
Event	Winner	Loser	Score
Men's Doubles Semifinals	(Netherlands) Jean-Julien Rojer [12] (Romania) Horia Tecău [12]	(Finland) Henri Kontinen [1] (Australia) John Peers [1]	1–6, 7–6^{(7–5)}, 7–5
Men's Doubles Semifinals	(Spain) Feliciano López [11] (Spain) Marc López [11]	(United States) Bob Bryan [5] (United States) Mike Bryan [5]	3–6, 6–3, 6–4
Matches on Grandstand
Event	Winner	Loser	Score
Women's Doubles Quarterfinals	(India) Sania Mirza [4] (China) Peng Shuai [4]	(Hungary) Tímea Babos [5] (Czech Republic) Andrea Hlaváčková [5]	7–6^{(7–5)}, 6–4
Women's Doubles Quarterfinals	(Chinese Taipei) Chan Yung-jan [2] (Switzerland) Martina Hingis [2]	(Chinese Taipei) Chan Hao-ching (China) Zhang Shuai	6–2, 6–2
Colored background indicates a night match
Matches start at 12pm, night session starts at 7pm Eastern Daylight Time (EDT)

== Day 12 (September 8) ==
- Seeds out:
  - Men's Singles: (Spain) Pablo Carreño Busta [12], (Argentina) Juan Martín del Potro [24]
  - Men's Doubles: (Spain) Feliciano López / (Spain) Marc López [11]
  - Women's Doubles: (Czech Republic) Lucie Šafářová / (Czech Republic) Barbora Strýcová [3], (India) Sania Mirza / (China) Peng Shuai [4]
- Schedule of Play

Matches on main courts
Matches on Arthur Ashe Stadium
Event	Winner	Loser	Score
Men's Doubles Final	(Netherlands) Jean-Julien Rojer [12] (Romania) Horia Tecău [12]	(Spain) Feliciano López [11] (Spain) Marc López [11]	6–4, 6–3
Men's Singles Semifinals	(South Africa) Kevin Anderson [28]	(Spain) Pablo Carreño Busta [12]	4–6, 7–5, 6–3, 6–4
Men's Singles Semifinals	(Spain) Rafael Nadal [1]	(Argentina) Juan Martín del Potro [24]	4–6, 6–0, 6–3, 6–2
Matches on Grandstand
Event	Winner	Loser	Score
Women's Doubles Semifinals	(Chinese Taipei) Chan Yung-jan [2] (Switzerland) Martina Hingis [2]	(India) Sania Mirza [4] (China) Peng Shuai [4]	6–4, 6–4
Women's Doubles Semifinals	(Czech Republic) Lucie Hradecká [7] (Czech Republic) Kateřina Siniaková [7]	(Czech Republic) Lucie Šafářová [3] (Czech Republic) Barbora Strýcová [3]	6–2, 7–5
Mixed Doubles Semifinals	(Switzerland) Martina Hingis [1] (United Kingdom) Jamie Murray [1]	(United States) CoCo Vandeweghe (Romania) Horia Tecău	6–4, 7–6^{(10–8)}

== Day 13 (September 9) ==
- Seeds out:
  - Women's Singles: (United States) Madison Keys [15]
  - Mixed Doubles: (Chinese Taipei) Chan Hao-ching / (New Zealand) Michael Venus [3]
- Schedule of Play

Matches on main courts
Matches on Arthur Ashe Stadium
Event	Winner	Loser	Score
Mixed Doubles Final	(Switzerland) Martina Hingis [1] (United Kingdom) Jamie Murray [1]	(Chinese Taipei) Chan Hao-ching [3] (New Zealand) Michael Venus [3]	6–1, 4–6, [10–8]
Women's Singles Final	(United States) Sloane Stephens [PR]	(United States) Madison Keys [15]	6–3, 6–0

== Day 14 (September 10) ==
- Seeds out:
  - Men's Singles: (South Africa) Kevin Anderson [28]
  - Women's Doubles: (Czech Republic) Lucie Hradecká / (Czech Republic) Kateřina Siniaková [7]
- Schedule of Play

Matches on main courts
Matches on Arthur Ashe Stadium
Event	Winner	Loser	Score
Women's Doubles Final	(Chinese Taipei) Chan Yung-jan [2] (Switzerland) Martina Hingis [2]	(Czech Republic) Lucie Hradecká [7] (Czech Republic) Kateřina Siniaková [7]	6–3, 6–2
Men's Singles Final	(Spain) Rafael Nadal [1]	(South Africa) Kevin Anderson [28]	6–3, 6–3, 6–4
