= 2018 US Open – Day-by-day summaries =

This is a list of day-by-day summaries of the 2018 US Open.

== Day 1 (August 27) ==
- Seeds out:
  - Men's Singles: (Bulgaria) Grigor Dimitrov [8], (United Kingdom) Kyle Edmund [16], (Spain) Roberto Bautista Agut [19], (Bosnia and Herzegovina) Damir Džumhur [24]
  - Women's Singles: (Romania) Simona Halep [1], (Russia) Anastasia Pavlyuchenkova [27], (Slovakia) Magdaléna Rybáriková [31]
- Schedule of Play

Matches on main courts
Matches on Arthur Ashe Stadium
Event	Winner	Loser	Score
Men's Singles 1st Round	(Switzerland) Stan Wawrinka [WC]	(Bulgaria) Grigor Dimitrov [8]	6–3, 6–2, 7–5
Women's Singles 1st Round	(United States) Venus Williams [16]	(Russia) Svetlana Kuznetsova [WC]	6–3, 5–7, 6–3
2018 US Open Opening Night Ceremony
Women's Singles 1st Round	(United States) Serena Williams [17]	(Poland) Magda Linette	6–4, 6–0
Men's Singles 1st Round	(Spain) Rafael Nadal [1]	(Spain) David Ferrer	6–3, 3–4, ret.
Matches on Louis Armstrong Stadium
Event	Winner	Loser	Score
Women's Singles 1st Round	(Estonia) Kaia Kanepi	(Romania) Simona Halep [1]	6–2, 6–4
Men's Singles 1st Round	(United Kingdom) Andy Murray [PR]	(Australia) James Duckworth [PR]	6–7^{(5–7)}, 6–3, 7–5, 6–3
Women's Singles 1st Round	(United States) Sloane Stephens [3]	(Russia) Evgeniya Rodina	6–1, 7–5
Women's Singles 1st Round	(Belarus) Victoria Azarenka [WC]	(Slovakia) Viktória Kužmová	6–3, 7–5
Men's Singles 1st Round	(Argentina) Juan Martín del Potro [3]	(United States) Donald Young [Q]	6–0, 6–3, 6–4
Matches on Grandstand
Event	Winner	Loser	Score
Women's Singles 1st Round	(Ukraine) Elina Svitolina [7]	(United States) Sachia Vickery	6–3, 1–6, 6–1
Men's Singles 1st Round	(United States) John Isner [11]	(United States) Bradley Klahn [WC]	7–6^{(7–3)}, 6–3, 6–4
Women's Singles 1st Round	(Czech Republic) Karolína Plíšková [8]	(Kazakhstan) Zarina Diyas	6–4, 7–6^{(7–4)}
Men's Singles 1st Round	(Canada) Denis Shapovalov [28]	(Canada) Félix Auger-Aliassime [Q]	7–5, 5–7, 4–1, ret.
Men's Singles 1st Round	(Austria) Dominic Thiem [9]	(Bosnia and Herzegovina) Mirza Bašić	6–3, 6–1, 6–4
Colored background indicates a night match
Matches start at 11am, night session starts at 7pm Eastern Daylight Time (EDT)

== Day 2 (August 28) ==
- Seeds out:
  - Men's Singles: (Italy) Marco Cecchinato [22], (France) Adrian Mannarino [29], (Serbia) Filip Krajinović [32]
  - Women's Singles: (United States) CoCo Vandeweghe [24], (Estonia) Anett Kontaveit [28]
- Schedule of Play

Matches on main courts
Matches on Arthur Ashe Stadium
Event	Winner	Loser	Score
Women's Singles 1st Round	(Denmark) Caroline Wozniacki [2]	(Australia) Samantha Stosur	6–3, 6–2
Men's Singles 1st Round	(Serbia) Novak Djokovic [6]	(Hungary) Márton Fucsovics	6–3, 3–6, 6–4, 6–0
Men's Singles 1st Round	(Switzerland) Roger Federer [2]	(Japan) Yoshihito Nishioka [PR]	6–2, 6–2, 6–4
Women's Singles 1st Round	(United States) Madison Keys [14]	(France) Pauline Parmentier	6–4, 6–4
Matches on Louis Armstrong Stadium
Event	Winner	Loser	Score
Women's Singles 1st Round	(Latvia) Jeļena Ostapenko [10]	(Germany) Andrea Petkovic	6–4, 4–6, 7–5
Women's Singles 1st Round	(Germany) Angelique Kerber [4]	(Russia) Margarita Gasparyan [PR]	7–6^{(7–5)}, 6–3
Men's Singles 1st Round	(Germany) Alexander Zverev [4]	(Canada) Peter Polansky [LL]	6–2, 6–1, 6–2
Men's Singles 1st Round	(Australia) Nick Kyrgios [30]	(Moldova) Radu Albot	7–5, 2–6, 6–4, 6–2
Women's Singles 1st Round	(Russia) Maria Sharapova [22]	(Switzerland) Patty Schnyder [Q]	6–2, 7–6^{(8–6)}
Matches on Grandstand
Event	Winner	Loser	Score
Women's Singles 1st Round	(Japan) Naomi Osaka [20]	(Germany) Laura Siegemund [PR]	6–3, 6–2
Men's Singles 1st Round	(Croatia) Marin Čilić [7]	(Romania) Marius Copil	7–5, 6–1, 1–1, ret.
Women's Singles 1st Round	(France) Caroline Garcia [6]	(United Kingdom) Johanna Konta	6–2, 6–2
Men's Singles 1st Round	(United States) Frances Tiafoe	(France) Adrian Mannarino [29]	6–1, 6–4, 4–6, 6–4
Colored background indicates a night match
Matches start at 11am, night session starts at 7pm Eastern Daylight Time (EDT)

== Day 3 (August 29) ==
- Seeds out:
  - Men's Singles: (Greece) Stefanos Tsitsipas [15], (United States) Jack Sock [18]
  - Women's Singles: (Germany) Julia Görges [9], (Spain) Garbiñe Muguruza [12], (Australia) Daria Gavrilova [25], (Greece) Maria Sakkari [32]
  - Men's Doubles: (Austria) Oliver Marach / (Croatia) Mate Pavić [1]
  - Women's Doubles: (United States) Nicole Melichar / (Czech Republic) Květa Peschke [8], (Poland) Alicja Rosolska / (United States) Abigail Spears [12]
- Schedule of Play

Matches on main courts
Matches on Arthur Ashe Stadium
Event	Winner	Loser	Score
Women's Singles 2nd Round	(United States) Sloane Stephens [3]	(Ukraine) Anhelina Kalinina [Q]	4–6, 7–5, 6–2
Men's Singles 2nd Round	(Spain) Fernando Verdasco [31]	(United Kingdom) Andy Murray [PR]	7–5, 2–6, 6–4, 6–4
Women's Singles 2nd Round	(United States) Serena Williams [17]	(Germany) Carina Witthöft	6–2, 6–2
Men's Singles 2nd Round	(Spain) Rafael Nadal [1]	(Canada) Vasek Pospisil	6–3, 6–4, 6–2
Matches on Louis Armstrong Stadium
Event	Winner	Loser	Score
Women's Singles 2nd Round	(Ukraine) Elina Svitolina [7]	(Germany) Tatjana Maria	6–2, 6–3
Women's Singles 2nd Round	(United States) Venus Williams [16]	(Italy) Camila Giorgi	6–4, 7–5
Men's Singles 2nd Round	(Argentina) Juan Martín del Potro [3]	(United States) Denis Kudla	6–3, 6–1, 7–6^{(7–4)}
Men's Singles 2nd Round	(Georgia (country)) Nikoloz Basilashvili	(United States) Jack Sock [18]	4–6, 6–3, 6–2, 7–6^{(7–3)}
Women's Singles 2nd Round	(Czech Republic) Karolína Muchová [Q]	(Spain) Garbiñe Muguruza [12]	3–6, 6–4, 6–4
Matches on Grandstand
Event	Winner	Loser	Score
Men's Singles 2nd Round	(Switzerland) Stan Wawrinka [WC]	(France) Ugo Humbert [Q]	7–6^{(7–5)}, 4–6, 6–3, 7–5
Women's Singles 2nd Round	(Russia) Ekaterina Makarova	(Germany) Julia Görges [9]	7–6^{(12–10)}, 6–3
Men's Singles 2nd Round	(United States) John Isner [11]	(Chile) Nicolás Jarry	6–7^{(7–9)}, 6–4, 3–6, 7–6^{(7–2)}, 6–4
Women's Singles 2nd Round	(United States) Sofia Kenin	(Greece) Maria Sakkari [32]	4–6, 6–4, 6–1
Colored background indicates a night match
Matches start at 11am, night session starts at 7pm Eastern Daylight Time (EDT)

== Day 4 (August 30) ==
- Seeds out:
  - Men's Singles: (Spain) Pablo Carreño Busta [12], (Italy) Fabio Fognini [14], (South Korea) Chung Hyeon [23]
  - Women's Singles: (Denmark) Caroline Wozniacki [2], (Russia) Daria Kasatkina [11]
  - Men's Doubles: (Japan) Ben McLachlan / (Germany) Jan-Lennard Struff [12]
  - Women's Doubles: (Slovenia) Andreja Klepač / (Spain) María José Martínez Sánchez [5], (United States) Vania King / (Slovenia) Katarina Srebotnik [11], (Japan) Miyu Kato / (Japan) Makoto Ninomiya [16]
  - Mixed Doubles: (Chinese Taipei) Chan Hao-ching / (Finland) Henri Kontinen [3], (Netherlands) Demi Schuurs / (Netherlands) Matwé Middelkoop [6]
- Schedule of Play

Matches on main courts
Matches on Arthur Ashe Stadium
Event	Winner	Loser	Score
Women's Singles 2nd Round	(Germany) Angelique Kerber [4]	(Sweden) Johanna Larsson	6–2, 5–7, 6–4
Men's Singles 2nd Round	(Switzerland) Roger Federer [2]	(France) Benoît Paire	7–5, 6–4, 6–4
Men's Singles 2nd Round	(Serbia) Novak Djokovic [6]	(United States) Tennys Sandgren	6–1, 6–3, 6–7^{(2–7)}, 6–2
Women's Singles 2nd Round	(Russia) Maria Sharapova [22]	(Romania) Sorana Cîrstea	6–2, 7–5
Matches on Louis Armstrong Stadium
Event	Winner	Loser	Score
Women's Singles 2nd Round	(Czech Republic) Petra Kvitová [5]	(China) Wang Yafan	7–5, 6–3
Men's Singles 2nd Round	(Germany) Alexander Zverev [4]	(France) Nicolas Mahut [LL]	6–4, 6–4, 6–2
Women's Singles 2nd Round	(United States) Madison Keys [14]	(United States) Bernarda Pera	6–4, 6–1
Men's Singles 2nd Round	(Japan) Kei Nishikori [21]	(France) Gaël Monfils	6–2, 5–4, ret.
Women's Singles 2nd Round	(Ukraine) Lesia Tsurenko	(Denmark) Caroline Wozniacki [2]	6–4, 6–2
Matches on Grandstand
Event	Winner	Loser	Score
Women's Singles 2nd Round	(Belarus) Aliaksandra Sasnovich	(Russia) Daria Kasatkina [11]	6–2, 7–6^{(7–3)}
Women's Singles 2nd Round	(France) Caroline Garcia [6]	(Puerto Rico) Monica Puig	6–2, 1–6, 6–4
Men's Singles 2nd Round	(France) Lucas Pouille [17]	(Cyprus) Marcos Baghdatis	6–7^{(4–7)}, 6–4, 6–4, 6–3
Men's Singles 2nd Round	(Croatia) Marin Čilić [7]	(Poland) Hubert Hurkacz [Q]	6–2, 6–0, 6–0
Colored background indicates a night match
Matches start at 11am, night session starts at 7pm Eastern Daylight Time (EDT)

== Day 5 (August 31) ==
- Seeds out:
  - Men's Singles: (Russia) Karen Khachanov [27], (Canada) Denis Shapovalov [28], (Spain) Fernando Verdasco [31]
  - Women's Singles: (United States) Venus Williams [16], (Czech Republic) Barbora Strýcová [23]
  - Men's Doubles: (Netherlands) Jean-Julien Rojer / (Romania) Horia Tecău [6], (South Africa) Raven Klaasen / (New Zealand) Michael Venus [8], (Spain) Feliciano López / (Spain) Marc López [10], (Chile) Julio Peralta / (Argentina) Horacio Zeballos [13]
  - Women's Doubles: (Netherlands) Kiki Bertens / (Sweden) Johanna Larsson [9], (Chinese Taipei) Chan Hao-ching / (China) Yang Zhaoxuan [10], (Romania) Irina-Camelia Begu / (Romania) Monica Niculescu [15]
- Schedule of Play

Matches on main courts
Matches on Arthur Ashe Stadium
Event	Winner	Loser	Score
Women's Singles 3rd Round	(United States) Sloane Stephens [3]	(Belarus) Victoria Azarenka [WC]	6–3, 6–4
Men's Singles 3rd Round	(Spain) Rafael Nadal [1]	(Russia) Karen Khachanov [27]	5–7, 7–5, 7–6^{(9–7)}, 7–6^{(7–3)}
Women's Singles 3rd Round	(United States) Serena Williams [17]	(United States) Venus Williams [16]	6–1, 6–2
Men's Singles 3rd Round	(Argentina) Juan Martín del Potro [3]	(Spain) Fernando Verdasco [31]	7–5, 7–6^{(8–6)}, 6–3
Matches on Louis Armstrong Stadium
Event	Winner	Loser	Score
Women's Singles 3rd Round	(Belgium) Elise Mertens [15]	(Czech Republic) Barbora Strýcová [23]	6–3, 7–6^{(7–4)}
Women's Singles 3rd Round	(Ukraine) Elina Svitolina [7]	(China) Wang Qiang	6–4, 6–4
Men's Singles 3rd Round	(South Africa) Kevin Anderson [5]	(Canada) Denis Shapovalov [28]	4–6, 6–3, 6–4, 4–6, 6–4
Men's Singles 3rd Round	(Canada) Milos Raonic [25]	(Switzerland) Stan Wawrinka [WC]	7–6^{(8–6)}, 6–4, 6–3
Women's Singles 3rd Round	(Czech Republic) Karolína Plíšková [8]	(United States) Sofia Kenin	6–4, 7–6^{(7–2)}
Matches on Grandstand
Event	Winner	Loser	Score
Women's Singles 3rd Round	(Latvia) Anastasija Sevastova [19]	(Russia) Ekaterina Makarova	4–6, 6–1, 6–2
Men's Singles 3rd Round	(Austria) Dominic Thiem [9]	(United States) Taylor Fritz	3–6, 6–3, 7–6^{(7–5)}, 6–4
Men's Singles 3rd Round	(United States) John Isner [11]	(Serbia) Dušan Lajović	7–6^{(10–8)}, 6–7^{(6–8)}, 6–3, 7–5
Colored background indicates a night match
Matches start at 11am, night session starts at 7pm Eastern Daylight Time (EDT)

== Day 6 (September 1) ==
- Seeds out:
  - Men's Singles: (Germany) Alexander Zverev [4], (Argentina) Diego Schwartzman [13], (France) Lucas Pouille [17], (France) Richard Gasquet [26], (Australia) Nick Kyrgios [30]
  - Women's Singles: (Germany) Angelique Kerber [4], (Czech Republic) Petra Kvitová [5], (France) Caroline Garcia [6], (Latvia) Jeļena Ostapenko [10], (Netherlands) Kiki Bertens [13]
  - Men's Doubles: (Finland) Henri Kontinen / (Australia) John Peers [2]
  - Women's Doubles: (Canada) Gabriela Dabrowski / (China) Xu Yifan [4]
  - Mixed Doubles: (Canada) Gabriela Dabrowski / (Croatia) Mate Pavić [1]
- Schedule of Play

Matches on main courts
Matches on Arthur Ashe Stadium
Event	Winner	Loser	Score
Women's Singles 3rd Round	(United States) Madison Keys [14]	(Serbia) Aleksandra Krunić	4–6, 6–1, 6–2
Men's Singles 3rd Round	(Switzerland) Roger Federer [2]	(Australia) Nick Kyrgios [30]	6–4, 6–1, 7–5
Women's Singles 3rd Round	(Russia) Maria Sharapova [22]	(Latvia) Jeļena Ostapenko [10]	6–3, 6–2
Men's Singles 3rd Round	(Serbia) Novak Djokovic [6]	(France) Richard Gasquet [26]	6–2, 6–3, 6–3
Matches on Louis Armstrong Stadium
Event	Winner	Loser	Score
Women's Singles 3rd Round	(Czech Republic) Markéta Vondroušová	(Netherlands) Kiki Bertens [13]	7–6^{(7–4)}, 2–6, 7–6^{(7–1)}
Women's Singles 3rd Round	(Slovakia) Dominika Cibulková [29]	(Germany) Angelique Kerber [4]	3–6, 6–3, 6–3
Men's Singles 3rd Round	(Germany) Philipp Kohlschreiber	(Germany) Alexander Zverev [4]	6–7^{(1–7)}, 6–4, 6–1, 6–3
Women's Singles 3rd Round	(Belarus) Aryna Sabalenka [26]	(Czech Republic) Petra Kvitová [5]	7–5, 6–1
Men's Singles 3rd Round	(Croatia) Marin Čilić [7]	(Australia) Alex de Minaur	4–6, 3–6, 6–3, 6–4, 7–5
Matches on Grandstand
Event	Winner	Loser	Score
Men's Singles 3rd Round	(Australia) John Millman	(Kazakhstan) Mikhail Kukushkin	6–4, 4–6, 6–1, 6–3
Women's Singles 3rd Round	(Ukraine) Lesia Tsurenko	(Czech Republic) Kateřina Siniaková	6–4, 6–0
Women's Singles 3rd Round	(Japan) Naomi Osaka [20]	(Belarus) Aliaksandra Sasnovich	6–0, 6–0
Men's Singles 3rd Round	(Japan) Kei Nishikori [21]	(Argentina) Diego Schwartzman [13]	6–4, 6–4, 5–7, 6–1
Colored background indicates a night match
Matches start at 11am, night session starts at 7pm Eastern Daylight Time (EDT)

== Day 7 (September 2) ==
- Seeds out:
  - Men's Singles: (South Africa) Kevin Anderson [5], (Croatia) Borna Ćorić [20], (Canada) Milos Raonic [25]
  - Women's Singles: (Ukraine) Elina Svitolina [7], (Belgium) Elise Mertens [15], (Australia) Ashleigh Barty [18]
  - Men's Doubles: (France) Pierre-Hugues Herbert / (France) Nicolas Mahut [9]
  - Women's Doubles: (United States) Raquel Atawo / (Germany) Anna-Lena Grönefeld [14]
  - Mixed Doubles: (Chinese Taipei) Latisha Chan / (Croatia) Ivan Dodig [4] (Withdrew), (Slovenia) Katarina Srebotnik / (New Zealand) Michael Venus [7], (United States) Abigail Spears / (Colombia) Juan Sebastián Cabal [8]
- Schedule of Play

Matches on main courts
Matches on Arthur Ashe Stadium
Event	Winner	Loser	Score
Men's Singles 4th Round	(Spain) Rafael Nadal [1]	(Georgia (country)) Nikoloz Basilashvili	6–3, 6–3, 6–7^{(6–8)}, 6–4
Women's Singles 4th Round	(United States) Serena Williams [17]	(Estonia) Kaia Kanepi	6–0, 4–6, 6–3
Women's Singles 4th Round	(United States) Sloane Stephens [3]	(Belgium) Elise Mertens [15]	6–3, 6–3
Men's Singles 4th Round	(Argentina) Juan Martín del Potro [3]	(Croatia) Borna Ćorić [20]	6–4, 6–3, 6–1
Matches on Louis Armstrong Stadium
Event	Winner	Loser	Score
Men's Singles 4th Round	(Austria) Dominic Thiem [9]	(South Africa) Kevin Anderson [5]	7–5, 6–2, 7–6^{(7–2)}
Women's Singles 4th Round	(Czech Republic) Karolína Plíšková [8]	(Australia) Ashleigh Barty [18]	6–4, 6–4
Men's Singles 4th Round	(United States) John Isner [11]	(Canada) Milos Raonic [25]	3–6, 6–3, 6–4, 3–6, 6–2
Men's Doubles 3rd Round	(Moldova) Radu Albot [Alt] (Tunisia) Malek Jaziri [Alt]	(United States) Christian Harrison [WC] (United States) Ryan Harrison [WC]	6–2, 4–6, 7–6^{(7–5)}
Matches on Grandstand
Event	Winner	Loser	Score
Men's Doubles 3rd Round	(United States) Austin Krajicek (United States) Tennys Sandgren	(Croatia) Nikola Mektić [PR] (Austria) Jürgen Melzer [PR]	6–3, 6–4
Women's Doubles 3rd Round	(Hungary) Tímea Babos [2] (France) Kristina Mladenovic [2]	(United States) Raquel Atawo [14] (Germany) Anna-Lena Grönefeld [14]	6–3, 6–4
Women's Doubles 3rd Round	(Australia) Samantha Stosur (China) Zhang Shuai	(Switzerland) Timea Bacsinszky [PR] (Russia) Vera Zvonareva [PR]	6–3, 6–3
Women's Singles 4th Round	(Latvia) Anastasija Sevastova [19]	(Ukraine) Elina Svitolina [7]	6–3, 1–6, 6–0
Colored background indicates a night match
Matches start at 11am, night session starts at 7pm Eastern Daylight Time (EDT)

== Day 8 (September 3) ==
- Seeds out:
  - Men's Singles: (Switzerland) Roger Federer [2], (Belgium) David Goffin [10]
  - Women's Singles: (Russia) Maria Sharapova [22], (Belarus) Aryna Sabalenka [26], (Slovakia) Dominika Cibulková [29]
  - Men's Doubles: (Croatia) Ivan Dodig / (Spain) Marcel Granollers [11], (Netherlands) Robin Haase / (Netherlands) Matwé Middelkoop [14], (United Kingdom) Dominic Inglot / (Croatia) Franko Škugor [16]
  - Women's Doubles: (Czech Republic) Andrea Sestini Hlaváčková / (Czech Republic) Barbora Strýcová [3]
  - Mixed Doubles: (United States) Nicole Melichar / (Austria) Oliver Marach [2]
- Schedule of Play

Matches on main courts
Matches on Arthur Ashe Stadium
Event	Winner	Loser	Score
Women's Singles 4th Round	(United States) Madison Keys [14]	(Slovakia) Dominika Cibulková [29]	6–1, 6–3
Men's Singles 4th Round	(Serbia) Novak Djokovic [6]	(Portugal) João Sousa	6–3, 6–4, 6–3
Women's Singles 4th Round	(Spain) Carla Suárez Navarro [30]	(Russia) Maria Sharapova [22]	6–4, 6–3
Men's Singles 4th Round	(Australia) John Millman	(Switzerland) Roger Federer [2]	3–6, 7–5, 7–6^{(9–7)}, 7–6^{(7–3)}
Matches on Louis Armstrong Stadium
Event	Winner	Loser	Score
Men's Singles 4th Round	(Japan) Kei Nishikori [21]	(Germany) Philipp Kohlschreiber	6–3, 6–2, 7–5
Women's Singles 4th Round	(Japan) Naomi Osaka [20]	(Belarus) Aryna Sabalenka [26]	6–3, 2–6, 6–4
Men's Singles 4th Round	(Croatia) Marin Čilić [7]	(Belgium) David Goffin [10]	7–6^{(8–6)}, 6–2, 6–4
Mixed Doubles Quarterfinals	(United States) Bethanie Mattek-Sands (United Kingdom) Jamie Murray	(Ukraine) Nadiia Kichenok (Netherlands) Wesley Koolhof	7–6^{(7–5)}, 6–7^{(6–8)}, [10–7]
Matches on Grandstand
Event	Winner	Loser	Score
Men's Doubles 3rd Round	(Colombia) Juan Sebastián Cabal [5] (Colombia) Robert Farah [5]	(Croatia) Ivan Dodig [11] (Spain) Marcel Granollers [11]	6–2, 2–6, 6–3
Men's Doubles 3rd Round	(United Kingdom) Jamie Murray [4] (Brazil) Bruno Soares [4]	(Netherlands) Robin Haase [14] (Netherlands) Matwé Middelkoop [14]	7–6^{(7–4)}, 6–4
Women's Singles 4th Round	(Ukraine) Lesia Tsurenko	(Czech Republic) Markéta Vondroušová	6–7^{(3–7)}, 7–5, 6–2
Colored background indicates a night match
Matches start at 11am, night session starts at 7pm Eastern Daylight Time (EDT)

== Day 9 (September 4) ==
- Seeds out:
  - Men's Singles: (Austria) Dominic Thiem [9], (United States) John Isner [11]
  - Women's Singles: (United States) Sloane Stephens [3], (Czech Republic) Karolína Plíšková [8]
  - Men's Doubles: (India) Rohan Bopanna / (France) Édouard Roger-Vasselin [15]
  - Women's Doubles: (Czech Republic) Lucie Hradecká / (Russia) Ekaterina Makarova [6]
  - Mixed Doubles: (Czech Republic) Andrea Sestini Hlaváčková / (France) Édouard Roger-Vasselin [5]
- Schedule of Play

Matches on main courts
Matches on Arthur Ashe Stadium
Event	Winner	Loser	Score
Women's Singles Quarterfinals	(Latvia) Anastasija Sevastova [19]	(United States) Sloane Stephens [3]	6–2, 6–3
Men's Singles Quarterfinals	(Argentina) Juan Martín del Potro [3]	(United States) John Isner [11]	6–7^{(5–7)}, 6–3, 7–6^{(7–4)}, 6–2
Women's Singles Quarterfinals	(United States) Serena Williams [17]	(Czech Republic) Karolína Plíšková [8]	6–4, 6–3
Men's Singles Quarterfinals	(Spain) Rafael Nadal [1]	(Austria) Dominic Thiem [9]	0–6, 6–4, 7–5, 6–7^{(4–7)}, 7–6^{(7–5)}
Matches on Louis Armstrong Stadium
Event	Winner	Loser	Score
Women's Doubles Quarterfinals	(Hungary) Tímea Babos [2] (France) Kristina Mladenovic [2]	(Czech Republic) Lucie Hradecká [6] (Russia) Ekaterina Makarova [6]	7–6^{(7–5)}, 6–2
Men's Doubles Quarterfinals	(Colombia) Juan Sebastián Cabal [5] (Colombia) Robert Farah [5]	(India) Rohan Bopanna [15] (France) Édouard Roger-Vasselin [15]	6–3, 6–4
Women's Doubles Quarterfinals	(Australia) Ashleigh Barty [13] (United States) CoCo Vandeweghe [13]	(Slovenia) Dalila Jakupović (Russia) Irina Khromacheva	6–2, 6–3
Mixed Doubles Quarterfinals	(United States) Christina McHale [WC] (United States) Christian Harrison [WC]	(Czech Republic) Andrea Sestini Hlaváčková [5] (France) Édouard Roger-Vasselin [5]	6–3, 6–4
Matches on Grandstand
Event	Winner	Loser	Score
Girls' Singles 2nd Round	(United States) Lea Ma [16]	(Slovakia) Lenka Stará	7–5, 6–0
Mixed Doubles Quarterfinals	(Poland) Alicja Rosolska (Croatia) Nikola Mektić	(Romania) Raluca Olaru (Croatia) Franko Škugor	7–6^{(7–5)}, 6–4
Men's Doubles Quarterfinals	(Poland) Łukasz Kubot [7] (Brazil) Marcelo Melo [7]	(United States) Austin Krajicek (United States) Tennys Sandgren	6–4, 6–2
Colored background indicates a night match
Matches start at 11am, night session starts at 7pm Eastern Daylight Time (EDT)

== Day 10 (September 5) ==
- Seeds out:
  - Men's Singles: (Croatia) Marin Čilić [7]
  - Women's Singles: (Spain) Carla Suárez Navarro [30]
  - Men's Doubles: (United Kingdom) Jamie Murray / (Brazil) Bruno Soares [4]
  - Women's Doubles: (Belgium) Elise Mertens / (Netherlands) Demi Schuurs [7]
- Schedule of Play

Matches on main courts
Matches on Arthur Ashe Stadium
Event	Winner	Loser	Score
Women's Singles Quarterfinals	(Japan) Naomi Osaka [20]	(Ukraine) Lesia Tsurenko	6–1, 6–1
Men's Singles Quarterfinals	(Japan) Kei Nishikori [21]	(Croatia) Marin Čilić [7]	2–6, 6–4, 7–6^{(7–5)}, 4–6, 6–4
Women's Singles Quarterfinals	(United States) Madison Keys [14]	(Spain) Carla Suárez Navarro [30]	6–4, 6–3
Men's Singles Quarterfinals	(Serbia) Novak Djokovic [6]	(Australia) John Millman	6–3, 6–4, 6–4
Matches on Grandstand
Event	Winner	Loser	Score
Men's Doubles Quarterfinals	(Moldova) Radu Albot [Alt] (Tunisia) Malek Jaziri [Alt]	(United Kingdom) Jamie Murray [4] (Brazil) Bruno Soares [4]	7–5, 6–4
Men's Doubles Quarterfinals	(United States) Mike Bryan [3] (United States) Jack Sock [3]	(Argentina) Máximo González (Chile) Nicolás Jarry	6–4, 7–6^{(7–3)}
Mixed Doubles Semifinals	(United States) Bethanie Mattek-Sands (United Kingdom) Jamie Murray	(United States) Christina McHale [WC] (United States) Christian Harrison [WC]	6–4, 2–6, [10–8]
Women's Doubles Quarterfinals	(Czech Republic) Barbora Krejčíková [1] (Czech Republic) Kateřina Siniaková [1]	(Belgium) Elise Mertens [7] (Netherlands) Demi Schuurs [7]	2–6, 7–6^{(9–7)}, 6–3
Colored background indicates a night match
Matches start at 11am, night session starts at 7pm Eastern Daylight Time (EDT)

== Day 11 (September 6) ==
- Seeds out:
  - Women's Singles: (United States) Madison Keys [14], (Latvia) Anastasija Sevastova [19]
  - Men's Doubles: (Colombia) Juan Sebastián Cabal / (Colombia) Robert Farah [5]
  - Women's Doubles: (Czech Republic) Barbora Krejčíková / (Czech Republic) Kateřina Siniaková [1]
- Schedule of Play

Matches on main courts
Matches on Arthur Ashe Stadium
Event	Winner	Loser	Score
Women's Singles Semifinals	(United States) Serena Williams [17]	(Latvia) Anastasija Sevastova [19]	6–3, 6–0
Women's Singles Semifinals	(Japan) Naomi Osaka [20]	(United States) Madison Keys [14]	6–2, 6–4
Matches on Louis Armstrong Stadium
Event	Winner	Loser	Score
Men's Doubles Semifinals	(Poland) Łukasz Kubot [7] (Brazil) Marcelo Melo [7]	(Moldova) Radu Albot [Alt] (Tunisia) Malek Jaziri [Alt]	7–6^{(7–3)}, 3–6, 6–3
Men's Doubles Semifinals	(United States) Mike Bryan [3] (United States) Jack Sock [3]	(Colombia) Juan Sebastián Cabal [5] (Colombia) Robert Farah [5]	6–2, 6–7^{(1–7)}, 6–4
Women's Doubles Semifinals	(Australia) Ashleigh Barty [13] (United States) CoCo Vandeweghe [13]	(Czech Republic) Barbora Krejčíková [1] (Czech Republic) Kateřina Siniaková [1]	6–4, 7–6^{(8–6)}
Women's Doubles Semifinals	(Hungary) Tímea Babos [2] (France) Kristina Mladenovic [2]	(Australia) Samantha Stosur (China) Zhang Shuai	6–4, 7–6^{(7–4)}
Wheelchair Men's Doubles Semifinals	(France) Stéphane Houdet / (France) Nicolas Peifer [1] vs (Belgium) Joachim Gérard / (Sweden) Stefan Olsson		Cancelled
Colored background indicates a night match
Matches start at 11am, night session starts at 7pm Eastern Daylight Time (EDT)

== Day 12 (September 7) ==
- Seeds out:
  - Men's Singles: (Spain) Rafael Nadal [1], (Japan) Kei Nishikori [21]
  - Men's Doubles: (Poland) Łukasz Kubot / (Brazil) Marcelo Melo [7]
- Schedule of Play

Matches on main courts
Matches on Arthur Ashe Stadium
Event	Winner	Loser	Score
Men's Doubles Final	(United States) Mike Bryan [3] (United States) Jack Sock [3]	(Poland) Łukasz Kubot [7] (Brazil) Marcelo Melo [7]	6–3, 6–1
Men's Singles Semifinals	(Argentina) Juan Martín del Potro [3]	(Spain) Rafael Nadal [1]	7–6^{(7–3)}, 6–2, 0–0 ret.
Men's Singles Semifinals	(Serbia) Novak Djokovic [6]	(Japan) Kei Nishikori [21]	6–3, 6–4, 6–2
Matches on Louis Armstrong Stadium
Event	Winner	Loser	Score
Wheelchair Men's Singles Quarterfinals	(Japan) Shingo Kunieda [1]	(Sweden) Stefan Olsson	0–6, 6–1, 6–3
Wheelchair Women's Singles Quarterfinals	(Japan) Yui Kamiji [2]	(Netherlands) Marjolein Buis	6–0, 6–0
Girls' Doubles Quarterfinals	(United States) Hailey Baptiste (United States) Dalayna Hewitt	(Japan) Himari Sato (China) Zheng Qinwen	6–3, 7–5
Wheelchair Women's Doubles Semifinals	(Netherlands) Marjolein Buis [2] (Netherlands) Aniek van Koot [2]	(United States) Dana Matthewson (South Africa) Kgothatso Montjane	6–1, 6–1

== Day 13 (September 8) ==
Serena Williams was attempting to equal Margaret Court's record of 24 Grand Slam titles and was also attempting to set new Open Era records to have a seventh US Open title, to surpass Chris Evert's record of six titles.

- Seeds out:
  - Women's Singles: (United States) Serena Williams [17]
- Schedule of Play

Matches on main courts
Matches on Arthur Ashe Stadium
Event	Winner	Loser	Score
Mixed Doubles Final	(United States) Bethanie Mattek-Sands (United Kingdom) Jamie Murray	(Poland) Alicja Rosolska (Croatia) Nikola Mektić	2–6, 6–3, [11–9]
Women's Singles Final	(Japan) Naomi Osaka [20]	(United States) Serena Williams [17]	6–2, 6–4
Wheelchair Men's Doubles Final	(United Kingdom) Alfie Hewett [2] (United Kingdom) Gordon Reid [2]	(France) Stéphane Houdet [1] (France) Nicolas Peifer [1]	5–7, 6–3, [11–9]
Matches on Louis Armstrong Stadium
Event	Winner	Loser	Score
Boys' Singles Semifinal	(Italy) Lorenzo Musetti	(United States) Jenson Brooksby [WC]	6–3, 6–3
Wheelchair Men's Singles Semifinal	(Japan) Shingo Kunieda [1]	(France) Nicolas Peifer	2–6, 6–4, 7–5
Wheelchair Women's Doubles Final	(Netherlands) Diede de Groot [1] (Japan) Yui Kamiji [1]	(Netherlands) Marjolein Buis [2] (Netherlands) Aniek van Koot [2]	6–3, 6–4
Wheelchair Quad Doubles Final	(United Kingdom) Andrew Lapthorne [1] (United States) David Wagner [1]	(Australia) Dylan Alcott [2] (United States) Bryan Barten [2]	3–6, 6–0, [10–4]

== Day 14 (September 9) ==
- Seeds out:
  - Men's Singles: (Argentina) Juan Martín del Potro [3]
  - Women's Doubles: (Hungary) Tímea Babos / (France) Kristina Mladenovic [2]
- Schedule of Play

Matches on main courts
Matches on Arthur Ashe Stadium
Event	Winner	Loser	Score
Women's Doubles Final	(Australia) Ashleigh Barty [13] (United States) CoCo Vandeweghe [13]	(Hungary) Tímea Babos [2] (France) Kristina Mladenovic [2]	3–6, 7–6^{(7–2)}, 7–6^{(8–6)}
Men's Singles Final	(Serbia) Novak Djokovic [6]	(Argentina) Juan Martín del Potro [3]	6–3, 7–6^{(7–4)}, 6–3
Matches on Louis Armstrong Stadium
Event	Winner	Loser	Score
Boys' Singles Final	(Brazil) Thiago Seyboth Wild [6]	(Italy) Lorenzo Musetti	6–1, 2–6, 6–2
Girls' Singles Final	(China) Wang Xiyu [3]	(France) Clara Burel [11]	7–6^{(7–4)}, 6–2
Wheelchair Women's Singles Final	(Netherlands) Diede de Groot [1]	(Japan) Yui Kamiji [2]	6–2, 6–3
Wheelchair Men's Singles Final	(United Kingdom) Alfie Hewett [2]	(Japan) Shingo Kunieda [1]	6–3, 7–5
