= 2016 US Open – Mixed doubles =

Mixed doubles
- 2016 US Open

Final
- Champions: (Germany) Laura Siegemund (Croatia) Mate Pavić
- Runners-up: (United States) CoCo Vandeweghe (United States) Rajeev Ram
- Score: 6–4, 6–4

Details
- Draw: 32
- Seeds: 8

Events
Singles	men	women		boys	girls
Doubles	men	women	mixed	boys	girls
WC Singles	men	women	quad
WC Doubles	men	women	quad
Legends	men	women	mixed
- US Open

Laura Siegemund and Mate Pavić won the title, defeating Vandeweghe and Ram in the final, 6–4, 6–4.

Martina Hingis and Leander Paes were the defending champions, but lost in the second round to CoCo Vandeweghe and Rajeev Ram.

== Seeds ==
1. (India) Sania Mirza / (Croatia) Ivan Dodig (second round)
2. (Kazakhstan) Yaroslava Shvedova / (Brazil) Bruno Soares (quarterfinals)
3. (United States) Bethanie Mattek-Sands / (Romania) Horia Tecău (withdrew)
4. (United States) Raquel Atawo / (Netherlands) Jean-Julien Rojer (first round)
5. (Chinese Taipei) Chan Hao-ching / (Belarus) Max Mirnyi (second round)
6. (Czech Republic) Andrea Hlaváčková / (Poland) Łukasz Kubot (second round)
7. (United States) CoCo Vandeweghe / (United States) Rajeev Ram (final)
8. (Czech Republic) Lucie Hradecká / (Poland) Marcin Matkowski (first round)

== Draw ==
Key

- Q = Qualifier
- WC = Wild card
- LL = Lucky loser
- Alt = Alternate
- ITF = ITF entry
- PR = Protected ranking
- SR = Special ranking
- SE = Special exempt
- JE = Junior exempt
- JR = Junior Accelerator Programme entrant
- CO = College Accelerator Programme entrant
- NG = Next Gen Accelerator Program entrant
- w/o = Walkover
- r = Retired
- d = Defaulted

=== Finals ===
Semifinals
7	(United States) CoCo Vandeweghe (United States) Rajeev Ram	7^{7}	6
(Germany) Anna-Lena Grönefeld (Colombia) Robert Farah	6^{4}	4
(Germany) Laura Siegemund (Croatia) Mate Pavić	7^{7}	7
(Chinese Taipei) Chan Yung-jan (Serbia) Nenad Zimonjić	6^{5}	5

Final
7	(United States) CoCo Vandeweghe (United States) Rajeev Ram	4	4
(Germany) Laura Siegemund (Croatia) Mate Pavić	6	6

=== Top half ===
First round
1	(India) S Mirza (Croatia) I Dodig	6	6
WC	(United States) T Townsend (United States) D Young	4	4
(Czech Republic) B Krejčíková (Croatia) M Draganja	6	6
Alt	(Latvia) J Ostapenko (Austria) O Marach	1	4
WC	(Switzerland) M Hingis (India) L Paes	6	6
WC	(United States) S Vickery (United States) F Tiafoe	3	2
(Australia) An Rodionova (Colombia) JS Cabal	3	6	[8]
7	(United States) C Vandeweghe (United States) R Ram	6	2	[10]
4	(United States) R Atawo (Netherlands) J-J Rojer	6^{4}	7	[4]
(Netherlands) M Krajicek (United Kingdom) D Inglot	7^{7}	5	[10]
(Germany) A-L Grönefeld (Colombia) R Farah	7	6
(Slovenia) A Klepač (Philippines) T Huey	5	4
WC	(United States) J Loeb (United States) N Rubin	5	4
(Canada) G Dabrowski (India) R Bopanna	7	6
(Croatia) D Jurak (France) F Martin	6^{5}	3
6	(Czech Republic) A Hlaváčková (Poland) Ł Kubot	7^{7}	6

Second round
1	(India) S Mirza (Croatia) I Dodig	3	4
(Czech Republic) B Krejčíková (Croatia) M Draganja	6	6
WC	(Switzerland) M Hingis (India) L Paes	6^{1}	6	[11]
7	(United States) C Vandeweghe (United States) R Ram	7^{7}	3	[13]
(Netherlands) M Krajicek (United Kingdom) D Inglot	4	6	[8]
(Germany) A-L Grönefeld (Colombia) R Farah	6	3	[10]
(Canada) G Dabrowski (India) R Bopanna	5	6	[10]
6	(Czech Republic) A Hlaváčková (Poland) Ł Kubot	7	3	[7]

Quarterfinals
(Czech Republic) B Krejčíková (Croatia) M Draganja	3	3
7	(United States) C Vandeweghe (United States) R Ram	6	6
(Germany) A-L Grönefeld (Colombia) R Farah	1	6	[10]
(Canada) G Dabrowski (India) R Bopanna	6	2	[8]

Semifinals
7	(United States) C Vandeweghe (United States) R Ram	7^{7}	6
(Germany) A-L Grönefeld (Colombia) R Farah	6^{4}	4

=== Bottom half ===
First round
5	(Chinese Taipei) H-c Chan (Belarus) M Mirnyi	6	6
(Slovenia) K Srebotnik (Finland) H Kontinen	4	4
(Spain) A Parra Santonja (Spain) M López	4	6	[6]
WC	(United States) N Gibbs (United States) D Novikov	6	3	[10]
WC	(United States) C McHale (United States) R Harrison	6^{4}	1
(Germany) L Siegemund (Croatia) M Pavić	7^{7}	6
(United States) A Spears (Mexico) S González	6	6^{5}	[10]
Alt	(Ukraine) O Savchuk (Sweden) R Lindstedt	3	7^{7}	[4]
8	(Czech Republic) L Hradecká (Poland) M Matkowski	5	7^{7}	[9]
(Russia) A Kudryavtseva (United States) S Lipsky	7	6^{3}	[11]
(Chinese Taipei) Y-j Chan (Serbia) N Zimonjić	6	6^{4}	[10]
WC	(United States) M Oudin (United States) M Krueger	0	7^{7}	[4]
(Hungary) T Babos (United States) E Butorac	7^{7}	6
WC	(United States) E Bektas (United States) E King	6^{5}	1
(China) Y Xu (Pakistan) A-u-H Qureshi	4	6	[8]
2	(Kazakhstan) Y Shvedova (Brazil) B Soares	6	3	[10]

Second round
5	(Chinese Taipei) H-c Chan (Belarus) M Mirnyi	5	6^{2}
WC	(United States) N Gibbs (United States) D Novikov	7	7^{7}
(Germany) L Siegemund (Croatia) M Pavić	6	6
(United States) A Spears (Mexico) S González	4	2
(Russia) A Kudryavtseva (United States) S Lipsky	1	2
(Chinese Taipei) Y-j Chan (Serbia) N Zimonjić	6	6
(Hungary) T Babos (United States) E Butorac	3	5
2	(Kazakhstan) Y Shvedova (Brazil) B Soares	6	7

Quarterfinals
WC	(United States) N Gibbs (United States) D Novikov	2	6^{2}
(Germany) L Siegemund (Croatia) M Pavić	6	7^{7}
(Chinese Taipei) Y-j Chan (Serbia) N Zimonjić	1	6	[13]
2	(Kazakhstan) Y Shvedova (Brazil) B Soares	6	3	[11]

Semifinals
(Germany) L Siegemund (Croatia) M Pavić	7^{7}	7
(Chinese Taipei) Y-j Chan (Serbia) N Zimonjić	6^{5}	5

== Other entry information ==
=== Wild cards ===
- (United States) Emina Bektas / (United States) Evan King
- (United States) Nicole Gibbs / (United States) Dennis Novikov
- (Switzerland) Martina Hingis / (India) Leander Paes
- (United States) Jamie Loeb / (United States) Noah Rubin
- (United States) Christina McHale / (United States) Ryan Harrison
- (United States) Melanie Oudin / (United States) Mitchell Krueger
- (United States) Taylor Townsend / (United States) Donald Young
- (United States) Sachia Vickery / (United States) Frances Tiafoe

=== Alternates ===
- (Latvia) Jeļena Ostapenko / (Austria) Oliver Marach
- (Ukraine) Olga Savchuk / (Sweden) Robert Lindstedt
