= 2016 US Open – Men's doubles =

Men's doubles
- 2016 US Open

Final
- Champions: (United Kingdom) Jamie Murray (Brazil) Bruno Soares
- Runners-up: (Spain) Pablo Carreño Busta (Spain) Guillermo García-López
- Score: 6–2, 6–3

Details
- Draw: 64
- Seeds: 16

Events
Singles	men	women		boys	girls
Doubles	men	women	mixed	boys	girls
WC Singles	men	women	quad
WC Doubles	men	women	quad
Legends	men	women	mixed
← 2015 ·	US Open	· 2017 →

Pierre-Hugues Herbert and Nicolas Mahut were the defending champions, but lost in the semifinals to Jamie Murray and Bruno Soares.

Murray and Soares went on to win the title, defeating Pablo Carreño Busta and Guillermo García-López in the final, 6–2, 6–3.

== Seeds ==
1. (France) Pierre-Hugues Herbert / (France) Nicolas Mahut (semifinals)
2. (Croatia) Ivan Dodig / (Brazil) Marcelo Melo (first round)
3. (United States) Bob Bryan / (United States) Mike Bryan (quarterfinals)
4. (United Kingdom) Jamie Murray / (Brazil) Bruno Soares (champions)
5. (Netherlands) Jean-Julien Rojer / (Romania) Horia Tecău (third round)
6. (Canada) Daniel Nestor / (Canada) Vasek Pospisil (first round, retired)
7. (South Africa) Raven Klaasen / (United States) Rajeev Ram (second round)
8. (Spain) Feliciano López / (Spain) Marc López (semifinals)

9. (Philippines) Treat Huey / (Belarus) Max Mirnyi (first round)
10. (Finland) Henri Kontinen / (Australia) John Peers (second round)
11. (France) Julien Benneteau / (France) Édouard Roger-Vasselin (first round)
12. (Poland) Łukasz Kubot / (Austria) Alexander Peya (quarterfinals)
13. (Colombia) Juan Sebastián Cabal / (Colombia) Robert Farah (first round)
14. (Uruguay) Pablo Cuevas / (Spain) Marcel Granollers (first round)
15. (Austria) Oliver Marach / (France) Fabrice Martin (second round)
16. (Czech Republic) Radek Štěpánek / (Serbia) Nenad Zimonjić (first round)

== Draw ==
=== Key ===
- Q = Qualifier
- WC = Wild card
- LL = Lucky loser
- Alt = Alternate
- ITF = ITF entry
- PR = Protected ranking
- SR = Special ranking
- SE = Special exempt
- JE = Junior exempt
- JR = Junior Accelerator Programme entrant
- CO = College Accelerator Programme entrant
- NG = Next Gen Accelerator Program entrant
- w/o = Walkover
- r = Retired
- d = Defaulted

=== Finals ===
Quarterfinals
1	(France) Pierre-Hugues Herbert (France) Nicolas Mahut	6	7^{7}
(Sweden) Robert Lindstedt (Pakistan) Aisam-ul-Haq Qureshi	3	6^{4}
4	(United Kingdom) Jamie Murray (Brazil) Bruno Soares	7^{11}	2	6
(Australia) Chris Guccione (Brazil) André Sá	6^{9}	6	3
8	(Spain) Feliciano López (Spain) Marc López	7^{7}	4	6
3	(United States) Bob Bryan (United States) Mike Bryan	6^{2}	6	3
12	(Poland) Łukasz Kubot (Austria) Alexander Peya	6^{8}	7^{7}	4
(Spain) Pablo Carreño Busta (Spain) Guillermo García-López	7^{10}	6^{3}	6

Semifinals
1	(France) Pierre-Hugues Herbert (France) Nicolas Mahut	5	6	3
4	(United Kingdom) Jamie Murray (Brazil) Bruno Soares	7	4	6
8	(Spain) Feliciano López (Spain) Marc López	3	6^{4}
(Spain) Pablo Carreño Busta (Spain) Guillermo García-López	6	7^{7}

Final
4	(United Kingdom) Jamie Murray (Brazil) Bruno Soares	6	6
(Spain) Pablo Carreño Busta (Spain) Guillermo García-López	2	3

=== Top half ===
==== Section 1 ====
First round
1	(France) P-H Herbert (France) N Mahut	7^{10}	6
WC	(United States) M McDonald (United States) M Redlicki	6^{8}	1
(Netherlands) R Haase (New Zealand) A Sitak	6	6
WC	(United States) D Kudla (United States) D Novikov	4	2
(Austria) D Thiem (Austria) T-S Weissborn	6	6^{3}	6
Alt	(United Kingdom) C Fleming (Poland) M Fyrstenberg	4	7^{7}	2
(France) J Chardy (Australia) S Groth	6	7^{7}
13	(Colombia) JS Cabal (Colombia) R Farah	1	6^{5}
10	(Finland) H Kontinen (Australia) J Peers	7^{7}	3	6
(Argentina) F Delbonis (Argentina) G Pella	6^{2}	6	3
(Sweden) R Lindstedt (Pakistan) A-u-H Qureshi	6	6
(Argentina) C Berlocq (Spain) A Ramos-Viñolas	3	4
(Chile) J Peralta (Argentina) H Zeballos	4	4
(Croatia) M Pavić (New Zealand) M Venus	6	6
PR	(Austria) J Knowle (Germany) F Mayer	1	3
5	(Netherlands) J-J Rojer (Romania) H Tecău	6	6

Second round
1	(France) P-H Herbert (France) N Mahut	6	6
(Netherlands) R Haase (New Zealand) A Sitak	3	4
(Austria) D Thiem (Austria) T-S Weissborn	6^{3}	4
(France) J Chardy (Australia) S Groth	7^{7}	6
10	(Finland) H Kontinen (Australia) J Peers	5	7^{9}	3
(Sweden) R Lindstedt (Pakistan) A-u-H Qureshi	7	6^{7}	6
(Croatia) M Pavić (New Zealand) M Venus	2	2
5	(Netherlands) J-J Rojer (Romania) H Tecău	6	6

Third round
1	(France) P-H Herbert (France) N Mahut	6	5	6
(France) J Chardy (Australia) S Groth	4	7	4
(Sweden) R Lindstedt (Pakistan) A-u-H Qureshi	6	7^{7}
5	(Netherlands) J-J Rojer (Romania) H Tecău	3	6^{4}

Quarterfinals
1	(France) P-H Herbert (France) N Mahut	6	7^{7}
(Sweden) R Lindstedt (Pakistan) A-u-H Qureshi	3	6^{4}

==== Section 2 ====
First round
4	(United Kingdom) J Murray (Brazil) B Soares	6	6^{3}	7
(Portugal) G Elias (Portugal) J Sousa	3	7^{7}	5
PR	(Poland) M Matkowski (Austria) J Melzer	4
(Ukraine) A Dolgopolov (Ukraine) S Stakhovsky	2^{r}
PR	(United States) B Baker (New Zealand) M Daniell	6	6
(Tunisia) M Jaziri (Chile) H Podlipnik-Castillo	3	2
(India) R Bopanna (Denmark) F Nielsen	6	6^{3}	6
16	(Czech Republic) R Štěpánek (Serbia) N Zimonjić	3	7^{7}	3
9	(Philippines) T Huey (Belarus) M Mirnyi	4	4
(Spain) N Almagro (Dominican Republic) V Estrella Burgos	6	6
(Italy) F Fognini (Italy) A Seppi	7^{7}	3	6
(United States) S Johnson (United States) S Querrey	6^{3}	6	3
(Australia) C Guccione (Brazil) A Sá	6	6
WC	(United States) J McNally (United States) J. J. Wolf	4	4
(United States) E Butorac (United States) S Lipsky	3	4
7	(South Africa) R Klaasen (United States) R Ram	6	6

Second round
4	(United Kingdom) J Murray (Brazil) B Soares	6	6
PR	(Poland) M Matkowski (Austria) J Melzer	1	1
PR	(United States) B Baker (New Zealand) M Daniell	6	7^{7}
(India) R Bopanna (Denmark) F Nielsen	2	6^{5}
(Spain) N Almagro (Dominican Republic) V Estrella Burgos	7^{8}	6
(Italy) F Fognini (Italy) A Seppi	6^{6}	3
(Australia) C Guccione (Brazil) A Sá	7^{7}	2	6
7	(South Africa) R Klaasen (United States) R Ram	6^{5}	6	3

Third round
4	(United Kingdom) J Murray (Brazil) B Soares	6	7^{9}
PR	(United States) B Baker (New Zealand) M Daniell	3	6^{7}
(Spain) N Almagro (Dominican Republic) V Estrella Burgos	6^{2}	2
(Australia) C Guccione (Brazil) A Sá	7^{7}	6

Quarterfinals
4	(United Kingdom) J Murray (Brazil) B Soares	7^{11}	2	6
(Australia) C Guccione (Brazil) A Sá	6^{9}	6	3

=== Bottom half ===
==== Section 3 ====
First round
8	(Spain) F López (Spain) M López	6	6
WC	(United States) R Harrison (United States) A Krajicek	4	4
(Cyprus) M Baghdatis (Luxembourg) G Müller	6	6^{2}	7^{7}
(Germany) D Brown (France) B Paire	3	7^{7}	6^{3}
(Spain) Í Cervantes (Italy) P Lorenzi	4	2
PR	(Chinese Taipei) Y-h Lu (Serbia) J Tipsarević	6	6
(Brazil) T Bellucci (Brazil) M Demoliner	7^{7}	6
11	(France) J Benneteau (France) É Roger-Vasselin	6^{4}	3
14	(Uruguay) P Cuevas (Spain) M Granollers	6	5	3
(Spain) D Marrero (Spain) F Verdasco	2	7	6
(Russia) A Kuznetsov (Russia) M Youzhny	5	3
(Argentina) A Molteni (Argentina) D Schwartzman	7	6
(Israel) J Erlich (Mexico) S González	6	6
(Argentina) G Durán (Argentina) M González	1	3
(Slovakia) M Kližan (Canada) A Shamasdin	1	3
3	(United States) B Bryan (United States) M Bryan	6	6

Second round
8	(Spain) F López (Spain) M López	6	6
(Cyprus) M Baghdatis (Luxembourg) G Müller	4	4
PR	(Chinese Taipei) Y-h Lu (Serbia) J Tipsarević	6	6^{5}	6^{4}
(Brazil) T Bellucci (Brazil) M Demoliner	3	7^{7}	7^{7}
(Spain) D Marrero (Spain) F Verdasco	7	6^{5}	6
(Argentina) A Molteni (Argentina) D Schwartzman	5	7^{7}	4
(Israel) J Erlich (Mexico) S González	4	4
3	(United States) B Bryan (United States) M Bryan	6	6

Third round
8	(Spain) F López (Spain) M López	6	6
(Brazil) T Bellucci (Brazil) M Demoliner	3	3
(Spain) D Marrero (Spain) F Verdasco	6	3	5
3	(United States) B Bryan (United States) M Bryan	2	6	7

Quarterfinals
8	(Spain) F López (Spain) M López	7^{7}	4	6
3	(United States) B Bryan (United States) M Bryan	6^{2}	6	3

==== Section 4 ====
First round
6	(Canada) D Nestor (Canada) V Pospisil	2^{r}
WC	(United States) T Fritz (United States) T Paul	2
WC	(United States) D Nguyen (United States) N Rubin	3	3
(United Kingdom) D Evans (Australia) N Kyrgios	6	6
(France) S Robert (Israel) D Sela	2	7	6
PR	(Germany) A Begemann (India) L Paes	6	5	4
WC	(United States) N Meister (United States) E Quigley	6^{5}	1
12	(Poland) Ł Kubot (Austria) A Peya	7^{7}	6
15	(Austria) O Marach (France) F Martin	6	0	6
PR	(Croatia) M Draganja (United Kingdom) D Inglot	4	6	4
(Netherlands) W Koolhof (Netherlands) M Middelkoop	4	6	6^{3}
(Spain) P Carreño Busta (Spain) G García-López	6	3	7^{7}
(France) A Mannarino (France) P-H Mathieu	6	3	3
(Serbia) D Lajović (Serbia) V Troicki	4	6	6
(United States) N Monroe (United States) D Young	7	7^{7}
2	(Croatia) I Dodig (Brazil) M Melo	5	6^{2}

Second round
WC	(United States) T Fritz (United States) T Paul	4	2
(United Kingdom) D Evans (Australia) N Kyrgios	6	6
(France) S Robert (Israel) D Sela	6^{5}	4
12	(Poland) Ł Kubot (Austria) A Peya	7^{7}	6
15	(Austria) O Marach (France) F Martin	5	7^{7}	3
(Spain) P Carreño Busta (Spain) G García-López	7	6^{2}	6
(Serbia) D Lajović (Serbia) V Troicki	6^{4}	6	5
(United States) N Monroe (United States) D Young	7^{7}	3	7

Third round
(United Kingdom) D Evans (Australia) N Kyrgios
12	(Poland) Ł Kubot (Austria) A Peya	w/o
(Spain) P Carreño Busta (Spain) G García-López	4	7^{7}	6
(United States) N Monroe (United States) D Young	6	6^{4}	3

Quarterfinals
12	(Poland) Ł Kubot (Austria) A Peya	6^{8}	7^{7}	4
(Spain) P Carreño Busta (Spain) G García-López	7^{10}	6^{3}	6

== Other entry information ==
=== Wild cards ===
- (United States) Taylor Fritz / (United States) Tommy Paul
- (United States) Ryan Harrison / (United States) Austin Krajicek
- (United States) Denis Kudla / (United States) Dennis Novikov
- (United States) Mackenzie McDonald / (United States) Martin Redlicki (Note: Winner of the men's doubles tournament in the 2016 NCAA Division I Tennis Championships)
- (United States) John McNally / (United States) J. J. Wolf
- (United States) Nicolas Meister / (United States) Eric Quigley
- (United States) Daniel Nguyen / (United States) Noah Rubin

=== Protected ranking ===
- (United States) Brian Baker / (New Zealand) Marcus Daniell
- (Germany) Andre Begemann / (India) Leander Paes
- (Croatia) Marin Draganja / (United Kingdom) Dominic Inglot
- (Austria) Julian Knowle / (Germany) Florian Mayer
- (Chinese Taipei) Lu Yen-hsun / (Serbia) Janko Tipsarević
- (Poland) Marcin Matkowski / (Austria) Jürgen Melzer

=== Alternates ===
- (United Kingdom) Colin Fleming / (Poland) Mariusz Fyrstenberg
