= Grandstand (US Open) =

Tennis stadium in Queens, New York

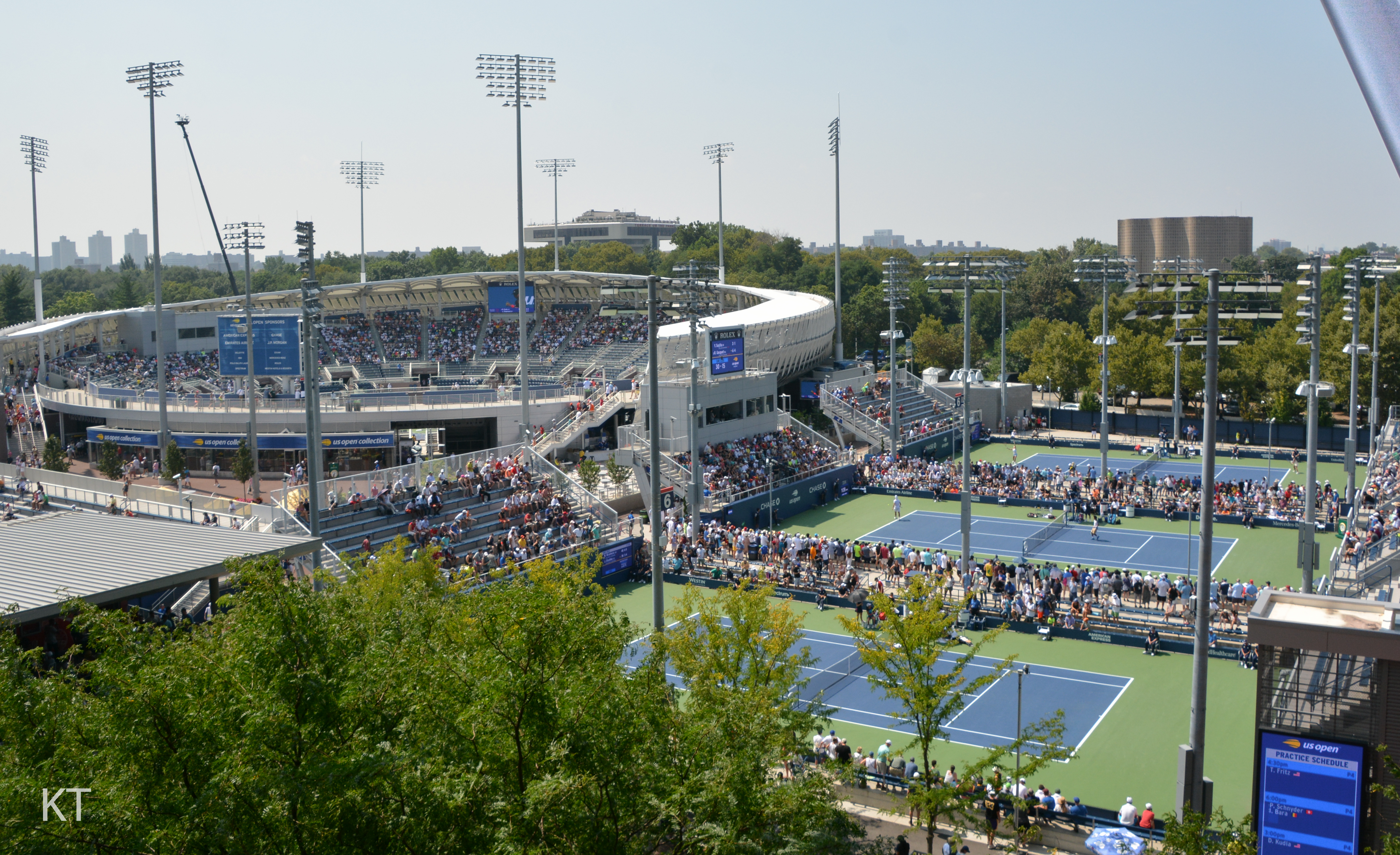
- Grandstand (left) and Courts 6, 5 & 4 at the 2018 US Open
- Interactive map of Grandstand
- Location: USTA Billie Jean King National Tennis Center, Flushing, Queens, New York City
- Coordinates: 40.747994°N 73.848115°W
- Owner: United States Tennis Association
- Capacity: 8,125
- Surface: DecoTurf (2016–2019); Laykold (2020–)
- Public transit: Long Island Rail Road (LIRR): Port Washington Branch at Mets–Willets Point; New York City Subway: trains at Mets–Willets Point; New York City Bus: Q90

Construction
- Groundbreaking: 2015
- Opened: August 29, 2016
- Architect: Rossetti Architects
- Builder: AECOM

Tenant
- US Open (USTA) (2016–present)

Grandstand is a tennis stadium situated in the USTA Billie Jean King National Tennis Center at Flushing Meadows–Corona Park in Queens, New York City. The stadium which has a capacity to seat 8,125 people, is owned by the United States Tennis Association. The court is the third largest at the national tennis center, after the Arthur Ashe and Louis Armstrong Stadiums. Built to host the US Open, Grandstand was constructed as part of a redesign of the national tennis center and is the first Leadership in Energy and Environmental Design tennis stadium in the world. The stadium designed by Rossetti Architects and constructed by AECOM is named after a 1978 stadium of the same name.

== History ==
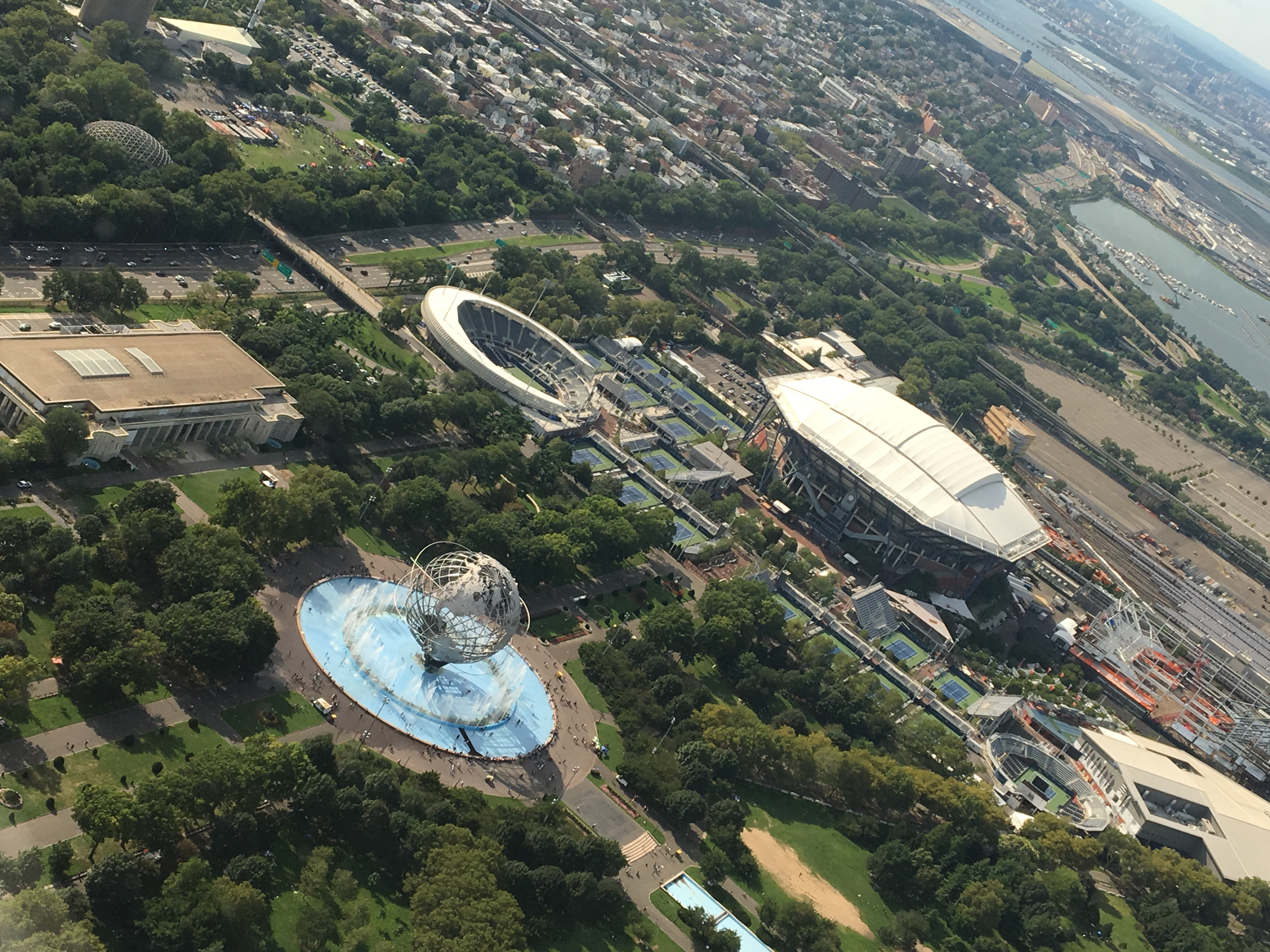
The new Grandstand court (l) with the Louis Armstrong Stadium under construction, the site of the original Grandstand court.

Grandstand replaced a court with the same name that was attached to the original Louis Armstrong Stadium, which opened in 1978 and was decommissioned in 2016. The original court was demolished in 2017 after being a practice court in 2016. The court was built as part of the USTA's $550m (£350m) scheme to renovate the National Tennis Center which was announced in August 2013 after obtaining planning permission in May of that year.

The stadium was designed by Rossetti Architects and has a capacity of 8,125 seats and covers an area of 125,000 square foot. 2,000 seats are reserved ticketed seats in the lower bowl, with the rest being allocated on a first come first served basis. The court is the third largest at the tennis center is around 2,000 seats larger than the original Grandstand court.

Construction of the court by AECOM began in 2015. Approximately 30 percent of the steel structure was in place by the time of the 2015 US Open. Four days after the tournament construction recommenced and the last steel piece was installed in December 2015. The court made its debut on August 29, 2016, the first day of the 2016 championships. Caroline Wozniacki beat Taylor Townsend 4–6, 6–3, 6–4 in the first match held on the court.

== Architecture ==
The stadium is situated in the Southwest corner of the National Tennis Center to help alleviate crowd issues and to distribute people more evenly. An estimated 20% of visitors to the site had been relocated due to the change. The tennis center was increased by 30 feet to have enough room to construct the new Grandstand court, however the USTA gave 1.56 acres of land back to compensate. The court itself was built on an old parking lot. The court is 18 feet below ground level. Due to its closeness to Flushing Meadows, the stadium was built with texture designed to be an "interesting folly" to patrons in the park. The outside of the stadium is made up by 400 panels of PTFE fabric to achieve this effect. Grandstand also contains a large retail store facing the main plaza and has several food vendors within its 360 degree concourse.

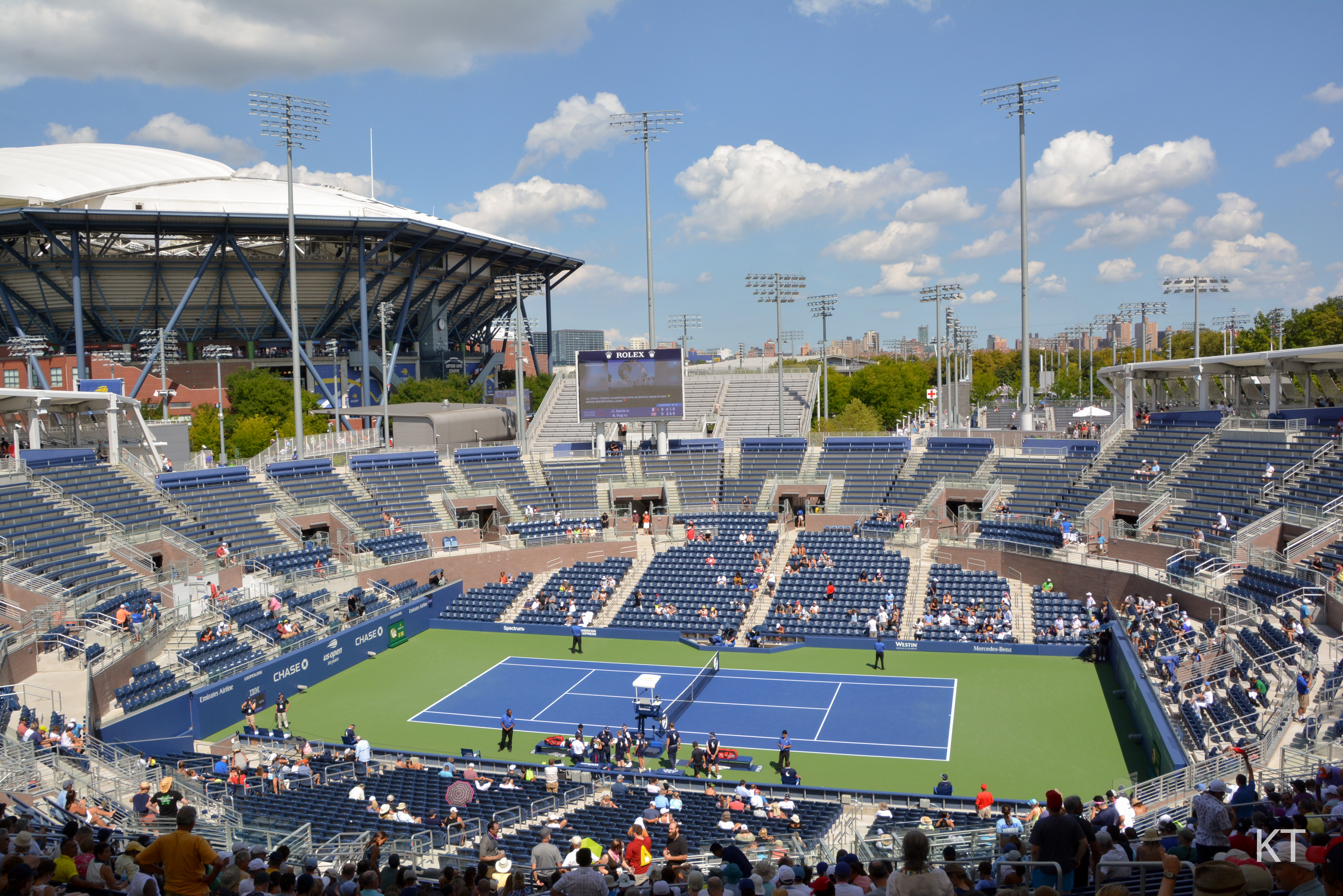
Inside Grandstand during a match between Caroline Garcia and Monica Puig.

The court has 16 sides and rises higher on the southwest corner and lower in the northeast corner. This design offers view of the grounds on the upper walkways and spectators in Arthur Ashe stadium are able to look into Grandstand. Although the court has 16 sides it looks round which is deliberate to create a diversity of shapes of the stadiums on the site.

It was made clear to the design team that spectators loved the intimacy and the shade of the old Grandstand and these features were incorporated into the design; with more seats in the stadium positioned in shady spots. The original Grandstand court's playing area measured 67-foot by 122-foot the new court mimicked this with a playing area of 70 feet by 126 feet. Originally the playing surface was Pro DecoTurf, which had been used by the tennis center since 1978, but in 2020 it was changed to Laykold courts made by Advanced Polymer Technology.

Grandstand is the first Leadership in Energy and Environmental Design tennis stadium in the world. The stadium claimed the NYCxDesign Award in the Outdoor/Urban Landscape category. The stadium also received an honourable mention in The Architect's Newspaper Best of Design Award in Facade.

== Transport ==
The New York City Subway and Long Island Rail Road both serve the northern end of Flushing Meadows Park, where Grandstand is situated. The IRT Flushing Line subway station at Mets–Willets Point serves the 7 and <7> trains, and the similarly named LIRR station serves the Port Washington Branch. These stations are located at the northern end of the park adjacent to the Corona Yard and bus depot, primarily serving Citi Field and the National Tennis Center. The Q90 bus from Flushing to La Guardia Airport serves the tennis center.
