= 2018 Caroline Wozniacki tennis season =

2018 tennis player season

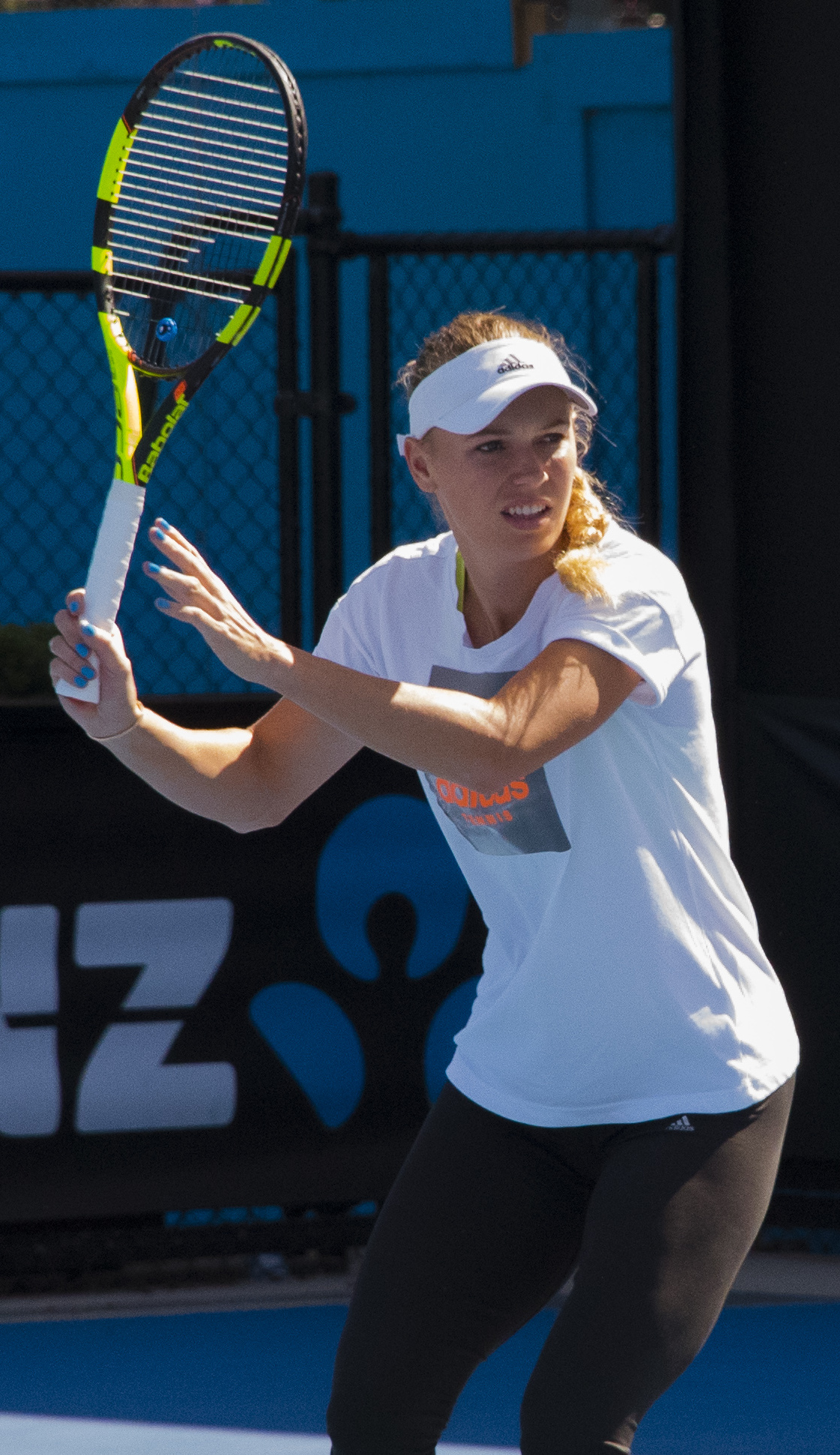
- Caroline Wozniacki practicing at the 2018 Australian Open
- Full name: Caroline Wozniacki
- Country: Denmark
- Calendar prize money: $6,657,719

Singles
- Season record: 41–17
- Calendar titles: 3
- Year-end ranking: No. 3
- Ranking change from previous year: Steady

Grand Slam & significant results
- Australian Open: W
- French Open: 4R
- Wimbledon: 2R
- US Open: 2R
- Championships: RR

Grand Slam mixed doubles results
- Injuries: Right leg injury Left knee injury
- Last updated on: 5 November 2018.

The 2018 Caroline Wozniacki tennis season officially began on 1 January 2018 with the start of the 2018 WTA Tour. Caroline Wozniacki entered the season ranked as world number 3 behind Simona Halep and Garbiñe Muguruza following the completion of the 2017 season.

== Year in detail ==
=== Early hard court season ===
==== Auckland Open ====
Wozniacki began her season at the Auckland Open. She was the top seed and advanced to the final after defeating Madison Brengle, Petra Martić, Sofia Kenin and Sachia Vickery. However, she would be defeated in straight sets by the same opponent who eliminated her in the previous year's quarterfinals, Julia Görges, in straight sets.

==== Australian Open ====
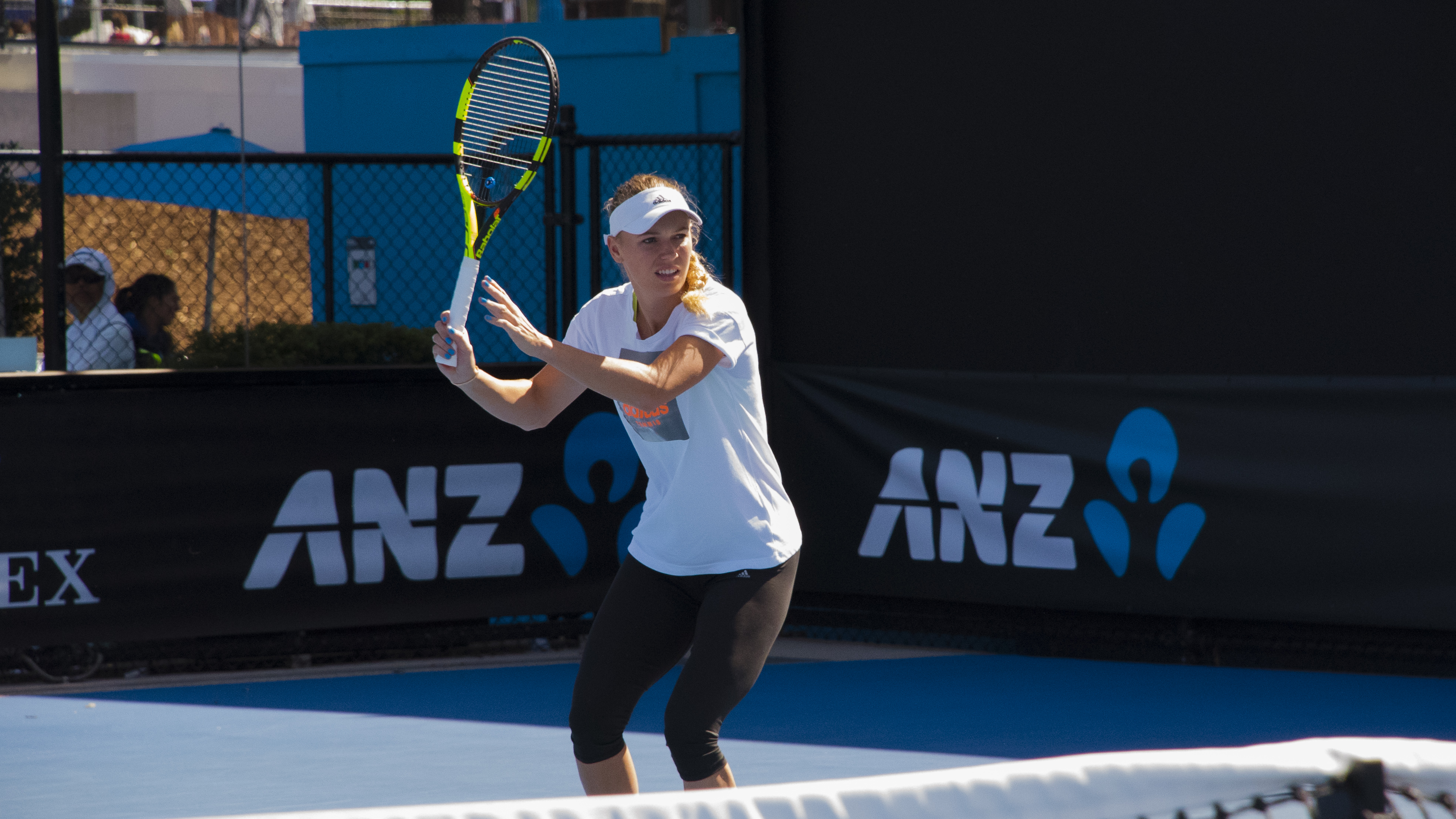
Wozniacki won her first slam at Melbourne Park.

Her next tournament was the Australian Open. She was seeded second, her highest seeding since the 2012 Australian Open. She defeated Mihaela Buzărnescu in straight sets before going on to beat Jana Fett in three sets after saving two match points. She then beat Kiki Bertens and Magdaléna Rybáriková both in straight sets to reach the quarterfinals. In the quarterfinals, she beat Carla Suárez Navarro in three sets to advance to her second Australian Open semifinal since 2011. In the semifinals she beat Elise Mertens to advance to her third Grand Slam final and her first since 2014.

Her last opponent was Simona Halep. Wozniacki took the opening set in a tiebreak, while Halep winning the second set. The third set had the most breaks of serve. After a series of breaks, Wozniacki won two points in a row to reach championship point. Wozniacki won the point, the match and the championship, after Halep hit a backhand into the net to become the seventh woman to win the title after being match point down in Open Era.

After winning her first Grand Slam title, she regained the world No. 1 ranking on 29 January 2018. Wozniacki was last ranked No. 1 on 29 January 2012, exactly 6 years ago, and her new ascension beats Serena Williams' previous record of 5 years 29 days.

==== St. Petersburg Ladies' Trophy ====
Wozniacki's next tournament was the St. Petersburg Ladies' Trophy, which she entered in the second round. She defeated the young Russian, Anastasia Potapova, in straight sets before she lost to Daria Kasatkina in the quarterfinals.

==== Qatar Open ====
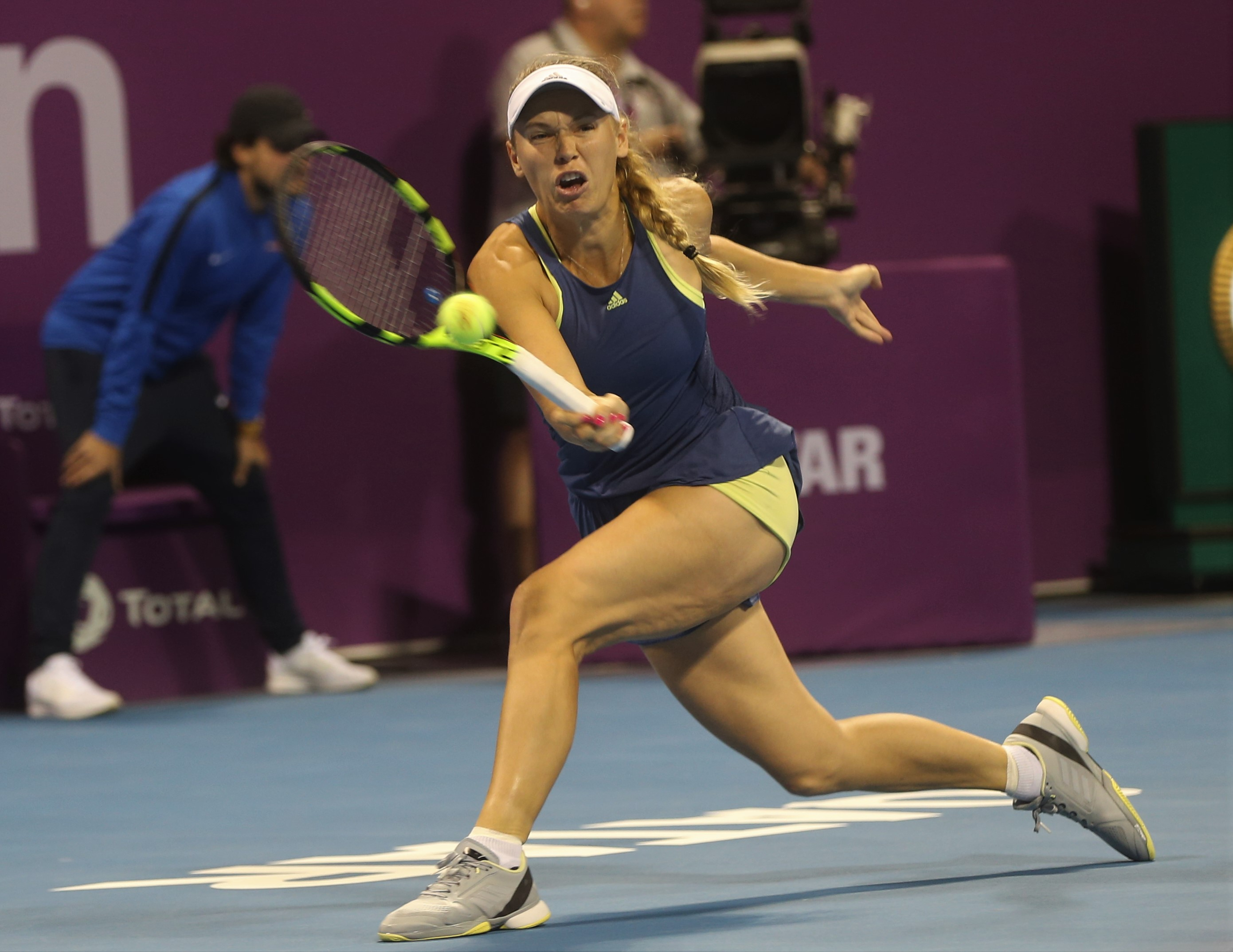
Wozniacki playing at the 2018 Qatar Total Open

Wozniacki then played in the Qatar Open, where she received a bye in the first round. She defeated Carina Witthöft with a bagel in the second set. The Australian Open champion put together a dominant performance and needed just 57 minutes to record the victory. She then defeated Monica Niculescu in straight sets to extend her head-to-head advantage to 9–0 over the Romanian. Her next opponent was former world No. 1, Angelique Kerber. Kerber got out to a fast start but the first set went to a tiebreak and ended in Wozniacki's favour. Kerber easily won set two. The third set was a marathon of long rallies but Wozniacki won in a gruelling two hours and 20 minutes. Against Petra Kvitová, Wozniacki was not so lucky. She lost, despite having two chances to serve for the match. However, with her Qatar performance, she became only the fourth player in WTA history to surpass $30,000,000 in career prize earnings.

=== March sunshine events ===
==== Indian Wells Open ====
Wozniacki then played the Indian Wells Open, where she received a bye in the first round. She defeated Lara Arruabarrena and Aliaksandra Sasnovich, in straight sets and three sets respectively before she lost to Daria Kasatkina again in the fourth round.

==== Miami Open ====
Wozniacki then entered the Miami Open, where she also received a bye in the first round. However, she lost to the Summer Olympics champion Monica Puig in three sets after sending a bagel in the opening set.

=== European clay court season ===
==== İstanbul Cup ====
Wozniacki started her 2018 clay season in the İstanbul Cup, where she defeated Ekaterina Alexandrova and Sara Errani in straight sets and three sets respectively. However, she chose to retire from the event against the eventual winner Pauline Parmentier in the quarterfinals.

==== Madrid Open ====
Wozniacki then played the Madrid Open. She defeated two Australians, Daria Gavrilova and Ashleigh Barty, and advanced into the third round. However, she lost to the eventual runner-up Kiki Bertens, who was defeated in the Australian Open, in straight sets.

==== Italian Open ====
Wozniacki's next tournament was the Italian Open, where she received a bye in the first round. She defeated Alison Van Uytvanck in straight sets in the second round and Anastasija Sevastova in three sets in the third round respectively before she lost to Anett Kontaveit in straight sets in the quarterfinals.

==== French Open ====
In the French Open, Wozniacki was the 2nd seed. In the first round, she defeated Danielle Collins after the opening-set tiebreak. In the second round, she easily defeated the Spanish qualifier Georgina García Pérez in just fifty minutes. Her opponent in the third round was the local people Pauline Parmentier, who just defeated Caroline couple of weeks ago on the way to her first WTA title since 2008. Wozniacki defeated the Frenchwoman in straight sets after sending a bagel in the opening set. Her next opponent was the 14th seed Daria Kasatkina, who defeated Wozniacki twice this year. Wozniacki eventually lost to the Russian in straight sets again after the match delayed to Monday.

=== United Kingdom grass court Season ===
==== Eastbourne International ====
Wozniacki started her 2018 grass season in the Eastbourne International, where she was the runner-up last year. She started her competition in the second round, where she defeated Camila Giorgi. In the third round, she defeated Johanna Konta for the first time in her career, in three sets. After defeating Ashleigh Barty in straight sets, she reached the semi-finals for the fifth time in six years. She defeated Angelique Kerber in three sets after saving a match point to advance into final. Her final opponent of the tournament was Aryna Sabalenka and the match was their first meet. Eventually, the Dane defeated the Byelorussian to win her second title of the year, and her 29th overall. The final also marked her 600th career match win.

==== Wimbledon Championships ====
Wozniacki then played in the Wimbledon Championships, where she was seeded second. In the first round, she defeated Varvara Lepchenko. However, she lost to Ekaterina Makarova, who defeated Wozniacki in the US Open also in the second round last year, in three sets despite saving five match points.

=== Summer US Open series ===
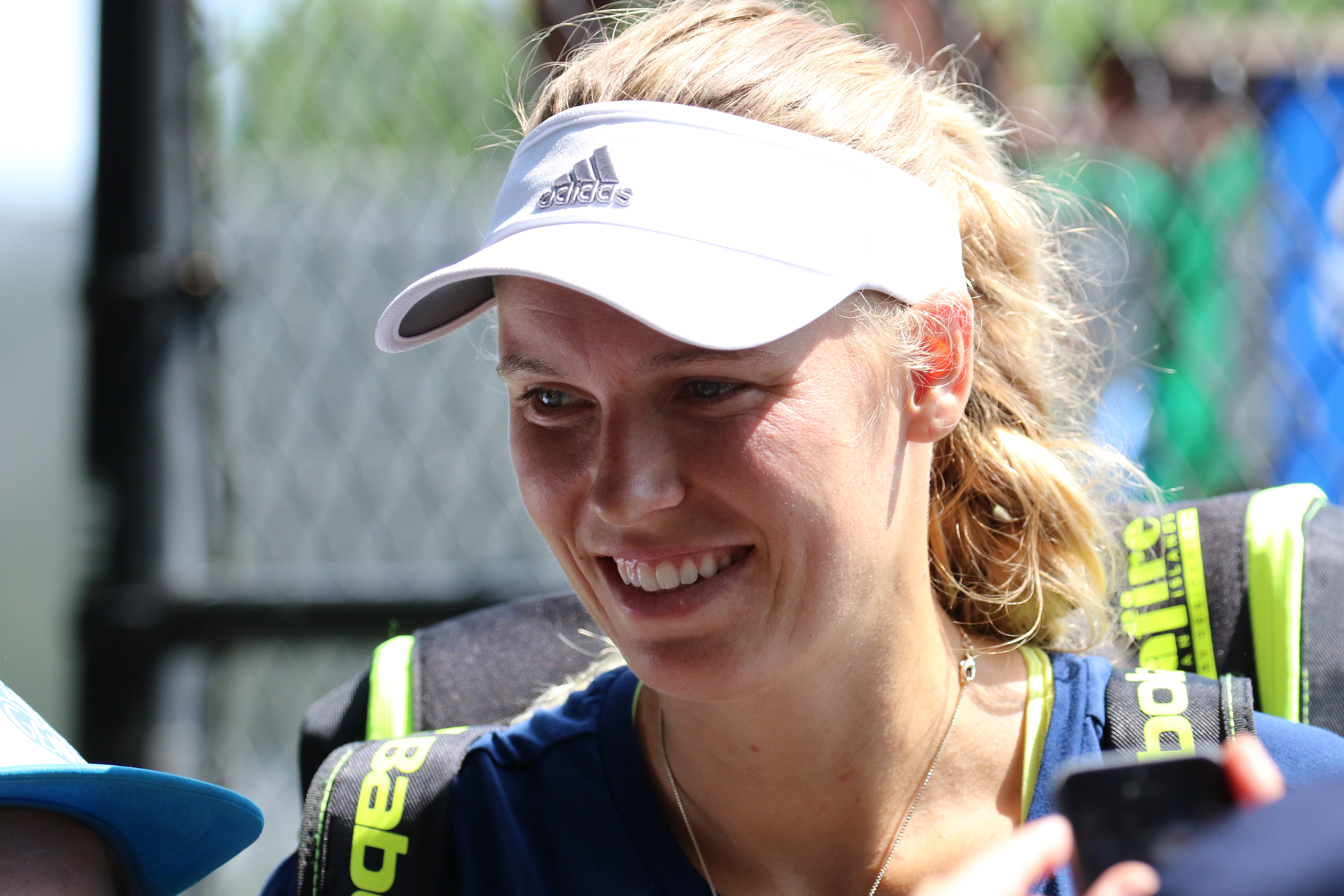
Wozniacki during the 2018 Citi Open

==== Washington Open ====
Wozniacki was scheduled to participate in the Washington Open, where she was supposed to be the top seed, but she was forced to retired before her first-round match against Anhelina Kalinina due to a right leg injury.

==== Canadian Open ====
After the retirement in Washington, she then participated in the Canadian Open, where she received a bye in the first round. Her first opponent was Aryna Sabalenka, who was defeated in the final of Eastbourne in straight sets. However, this time she lost to the Belarusian in three sets after wasting three match points.

==== Cincinnati Open ====
At Cincinnati, Wozniacki retired against the eventual winner Kiki Bertens in her first match of the tournament after losing the opening set because of a left knee injury.

==== US Open ====
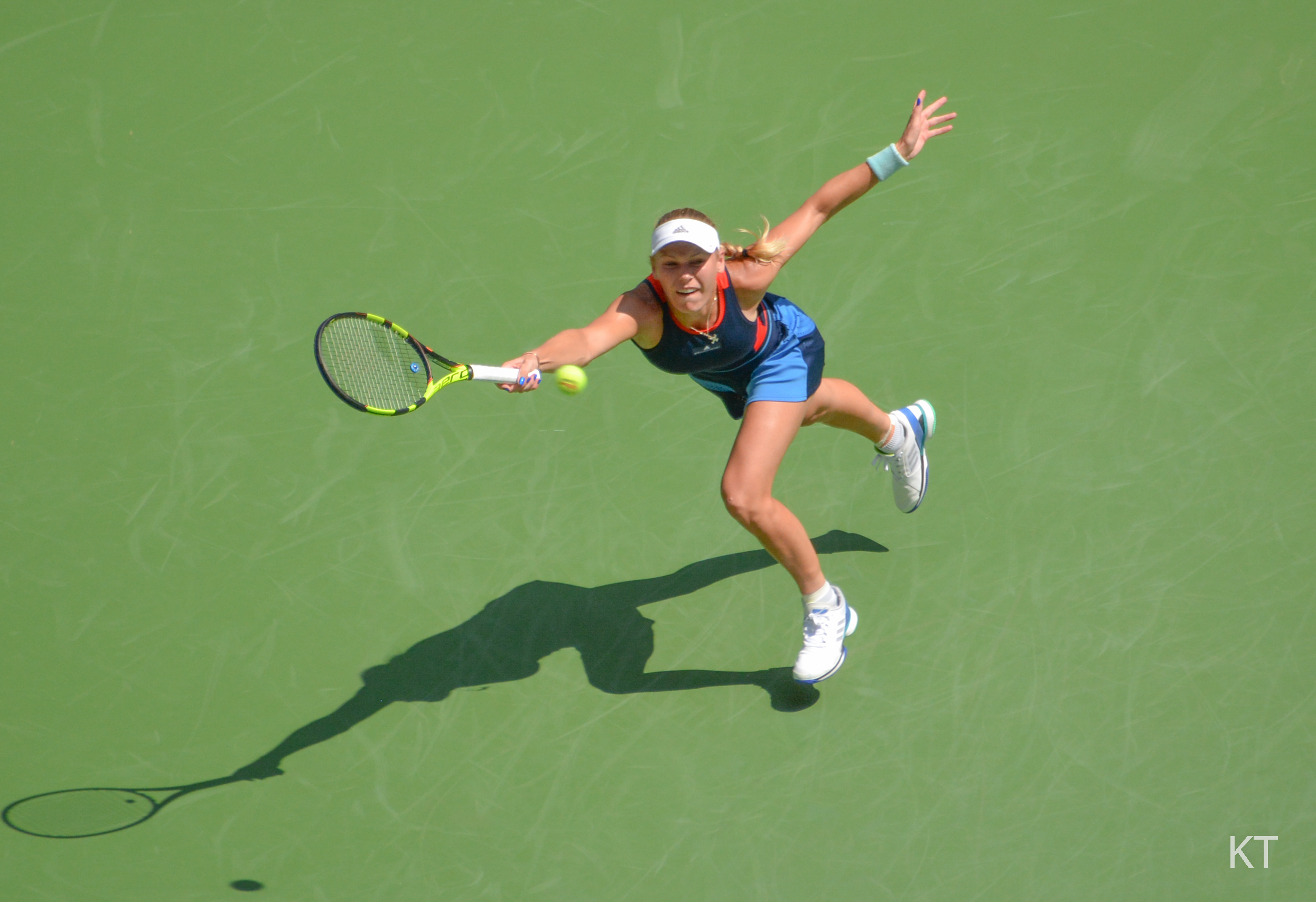
Wozniacki playing at the 2018 US Open

In the US Open, Wozniacki defeated former champion Samantha Stosur in straight sets before she lost to Lesia Tsurenko in the second round.

=== East Asian hardcourt season ===
==== Toray Pan Pacific Open ====
In fall, Wozniacki played the Pan Pacific Open, where she was the top seed, by receiving a wildcard as the defending champion. However, she lost to Camila Giorgi in three sets in the second round.

==== Wuhan Open ====
A week later, in Wuhan, Wozniacki was upset by Monica Puig for the second time this season in straight sets in third round after defeated qualifier Rebecca Peterson.

==== China Open ====
Wozniacki then played the China Open. In the first round, she defeated Belinda Bencic, who had a small advantage on head-to-head, in straight sets. Then she defeated Petra Martić for the second time this year in straight sets. In the third round, She defeated Anett Kontaveit, who defeated the Dann at Montreal in straight sets. In the semifinals, she upset local favourite Wang Qiang in straight sets. In the final, she held off Anastasija Sevastova to win the China Open title for the second time in her career without losing a set. This was also her first Premier Mandatory level title since winning the 2011 BNP Paribas Open and her 30th WTA title.

=== Year-end Championships ===
==== WTA Finals ====
After reaching the quarterfinals in Beijing in her last tournament, Wozniacki became the fifth player to secure Singapore spot. As the second seed, she led the White Group, alongside Petra Kvitová, Elina Svitolina and Karolína Plíšková. However, her road to defend her title did not start very well. In her first round robin match, she lost to World No. 7 Karolína Plíšková in straight sets after saving two match points. She then defeated Petra Kvitová in three sets before was upset by Elina Svitolina. The outcome made her finished third in the group, which meant she was unable to advance into the semifinals.

After eliminating in the round robin, Wozniacki announced that she was diagnosed with Rheumatoid arthritis, but would like to become a role model for people with the condition. Nevertheless, she still finished the season as World No. 3.

== All matches ==
Key
W	F	SF	QF	#R	RR	Q#	P#	DNQ	A	Z#	PO	G	S	B	NMS	NTI	P	NH

(W) winner; (F) finalist; (SF) semifinalist; (QF) quarterfinalist; (#R) rounds 4, 3, 2, 1; (RR) round-robin stage; (Q#) qualification round; (P#) preliminary round; (DNQ) did not qualify; (A) absent; (Z#) Davis/Fed Cup Zonal Group (with number indication) or (PO) play-off; (G) gold, (S) silver or (B) bronze Olympic/Paralympic medal; (NMS) not a Masters tournament; (NTI) not a Tier I tournament; (P) postponed; (NH) not held; (SR) strike rate (events won / competed); (W–L) win–loss record.
To avoid confusion and double counting, these charts are updated at the conclusion of a tournament or when the player's participation has ended.

=== Singles matches ===
Tournament	Match	Round	Opponent	Rank	Result	Score
Auckland Open; Auckland, New Zealand; WTA International; Hard, outdoor 1–7 January 2018	1	1R	(United States) Madison Brengle	85	Win	6–3, 6–0
Auckland Open; Auckland, New Zealand; WTA International; Hard, outdoor 1–7 January 2018	2	2R	(Croatia) Petra Martić	90	Win	6–2, 6–2
Auckland Open; Auckland, New Zealand; WTA International; Hard, outdoor 1–7 January 2018	3	QF	(United States) Sofia Kenin (WC)	108	Win	4–6, 6–2, 6–4
Auckland Open; Auckland, New Zealand; WTA International; Hard, outdoor 1–7 January 2018	4	SF	(United States) Sachia Vickery (Q)	122	Win	6–4, 6–4
Auckland Open; Auckland, New Zealand; WTA International; Hard, outdoor 1–7 January 2018	5	F	(Germany) Julia Görges (2)	14	Loss (1)	4–6, 6–7^{(2–7)}
Australian Open; Melbourne, Australia; Grand Slam; Hard, outdoor 15–28 January 2018	6	1R	(Romania) Mihaela Buzărnescu	44	Win	6–2, 6–3
Australian Open; Melbourne, Australia; Grand Slam; Hard, outdoor 15–28 January 2018	7	2R	(Croatia) Jana Fett	119	Win	3–6, 6–2, 7–5
Australian Open; Melbourne, Australia; Grand Slam; Hard, outdoor 15–28 January 2018	8	3R	(Netherlands) Kiki Bertens (30)	32	Win	6–4, 6–3
Australian Open; Melbourne, Australia; Grand Slam; Hard, outdoor 15–28 January 2018	9	4R	(Slovakia) Magdaléna Rybáriková (19)	21	Win	6–3, 6–0
Australian Open; Melbourne, Australia; Grand Slam; Hard, outdoor 15–28 January 2018	10	QF	(Spain) Carla Suárez Navarro	39	Win	6–0, 6–7^{(3–7)}, 6–2
Australian Open; Melbourne, Australia; Grand Slam; Hard, outdoor 15–28 January 2018	11	SF	(Belgium) Elise Mertens	37	Win	6–3, 7–6^{(7–2)}
Australian Open; Melbourne, Australia; Grand Slam; Hard, outdoor 15–28 January 2018	12	W	(Romania) Simona Halep (1)	1	Win (1)	7–6^{(7–2)}, 3–6, 6–4
St. Petersburg Ladies' Trophy; Saint Petersburg, Russia; WTA Premier; Hard, indoor 29 January – 4 February 2018	–	1R	Bye			
St. Petersburg Ladies' Trophy; Saint Petersburg, Russia; WTA Premier; Hard, indoor 29 January – 4 February 2018	13	2R	(Russia) Anastasia Potapova (WC)	235	Win	6–0, 6–1
St. Petersburg Ladies' Trophy; Saint Petersburg, Russia; WTA Premier; Hard, indoor 29 January – 4 February 2018	14	QF	(Russia) Daria Kasatkina (8)	23	Loss	6–7^{(2–7)}, 3–6
Qatar Open; Doha, Qatar; WTA Premier 5 Hard, outdoor 12–17 February 2018	–	1R	Bye			
Qatar Open; Doha, Qatar; WTA Premier 5 Hard, outdoor 12–17 February 2018	15	2R	(Germany) Carina Witthöft	52	Win	6–2, 6–0
Qatar Open; Doha, Qatar; WTA Premier 5 Hard, outdoor 12–17 February 2018	16	3R	(Romania) Monica Niculescu (Q)	92	Win	7–5, 6–1
Qatar Open; Doha, Qatar; WTA Premier 5 Hard, outdoor 12–17 February 2018	17	QF	(Germany) Angelique Kerber (8)	9	Win	7–6^{(7–4)}, 1–6, 6–3
Qatar Open; Doha, Qatar; WTA Premier 5 Hard, outdoor 12–17 February 2018	18	SF	(Czech Republic) Petra Kvitová (16)	21	Loss	6–3, 6–7^{(3–7)}, 5–7
Indian Wells Open; Indian Wells, United States; WTA Premier Mandatory; Hard, outdoor 5–18 March 2018	–	1R	Bye			
Indian Wells Open; Indian Wells, United States; WTA Premier Mandatory; Hard, outdoor 5–18 March 2018	19	2R	(Spain) Lara Arruabarrena (Q)	80	Win	6–4, 6–1
Indian Wells Open; Indian Wells, United States; WTA Premier Mandatory; Hard, outdoor 5–18 March 2018	20	3R	(Belarus) Aliaksandra Sasnovich	49	Win	6–4, 2–6, 6–3
Indian Wells Open; Indian Wells, United States; WTA Premier Mandatory; Hard, outdoor 5–18 March 2018	21	4R	(Russia) Daria Kasatkina (20)	19	Loss	4–6, 5–7
Miami Open; Miami, United States; WTA Premier Mandatory; Hard, outdoor 19 March – 1 April 2018	–	1R	Bye			
Miami Open; Miami, United States; WTA Premier Mandatory; Hard, outdoor 19 March – 1 April 2018	22	2R	(Puerto Rico) Monica Puig	82	Loss	6–0, 4–6, 4–6
İstanbul Cup; Istanbul, Turkey; WTA International; Clay, outdoor 23–29 April 2018	23	1R	(Russia) Ekaterina Alexandrova	82	Win	6–2, 6–2
İstanbul Cup; Istanbul, Turkey; WTA International; Clay, outdoor 23–29 April 2018	24	2R	(Italy) Sara Errani	93	Win	5–7, 6–3, 6–3
İstanbul Cup; Istanbul, Turkey; WTA International; Clay, outdoor 23–29 April 2018	25	QF	(France) Pauline Parmentier	122	Loss	6–4, 3–6 retired
Madrid Open; Madrid, Spain; WTA Premier Mandatory; Clay, outdoor 7–13 May 2018	26	1R	(Australia) Daria Gavrilova	24	Win	6–3, 6–1
Madrid Open; Madrid, Spain; WTA Premier Mandatory; Clay, outdoor 7–13 May 2018	27	2R	(Australia) Ashleigh Barty	18	Win	6–2, 4–6, 6–4
Madrid Open; Madrid, Spain; WTA Premier Mandatory; Clay, outdoor 7–13 May 2018	28	3R	(Netherlands) Kiki Bertens	20	Loss	2–6, 2–6
Italian Open; Rome, Italy; WTA Premier 5 Clay, outdoor 14–20 May 2018	–	1R	Bye			
Italian Open; Rome, Italy; WTA Premier 5 Clay, outdoor 14–20 May 2018	29	2R	(Belgium) Alison Van Uytvanck	49	Win	6–4, 6–1
Italian Open; Rome, Italy; WTA Premier 5 Clay, outdoor 14–20 May 2018	30	3R	(Latvia) Anastasija Sevastova (15)	20	Win	6–2, 5–7, 6–3
Italian Open; Rome, Italy; WTA Premier 5 Clay, outdoor 14–20 May 2018	31	QF	(Estonia) Anett Kontaveit	23	Loss	3–6, 1–6
French Open; Paris, France; Grand Slam; Clay, outdoor 27 May –10 June 2018	32	1R	(United States) Danielle Collins	41	Win	7–6^{(7–2)}, 6–1
French Open; Paris, France; Grand Slam; Clay, outdoor 27 May –10 June 2018	33	2R	(Spain) Georgina García Pérez (Q)	186	Win	6–1, 6–0
French Open; Paris, France; Grand Slam; Clay, outdoor 27 May –10 June 2018	34	3R	(France) Pauline Parmentier (WC)	74	Win	6–0, 6–3
French Open; Paris, France; Grand Slam; Clay, outdoor 27 May –10 June 2018	35	4R	(Russia) Daria Kasatkina (14)	14	Loss	6–7^{(5–7)}, 3–6
Eastbourne International; Eastbourne, United Kingdom; WTA Premier; Grass, indoor 24–30 June 2018	–	1R	Bye			
Eastbourne International; Eastbourne, United Kingdom; WTA Premier; Grass, indoor 24–30 June 2018	36	2R	(Italy) Camila Giorgi	56	Win	6–2, 6–3
Eastbourne International; Eastbourne, United Kingdom; WTA Premier; Grass, indoor 24–30 June 2018	37	3R	(United Kingdom) Johanna Konta (13)	22	Win	4–6, 6–1, 6–4
Eastbourne International; Eastbourne, United Kingdom; WTA Premier; Grass, indoor 24–30 June 2018	38	QF	(Australia) Ashleigh Barty (8)	17	Win	6–4, 6–3
Eastbourne International; Eastbourne, United Kingdom; WTA Premier; Grass, indoor 24–30 June 2018	39	SF	(Germany) Angelique Kerber (4)	11	Win	2–6, 7–6^{(7–4)}, 6–4
Eastbourne International; Eastbourne, United Kingdom; WTA Premier; Grass, indoor 24–30 June 2018	40	W	(Belarus) Aryna Sabalenka	45	Win (2)	7–5, 7–6^{(7–5)}
Wimbledon Championships; London, United Kingdom; Grand Slam; Grass, outdoor 2 –15 July 2018	41	1R	(United States) Varvara Lepchenko	97	Win	6–0, 6–3
Wimbledon Championships; London, United Kingdom; Grand Slam; Grass, outdoor 2 –15 July 2018	42	2R	(Russia) Ekaterina Makarova	35	Loss	4–6, 6–1, 5–7
Washington Open; Washington, D.C., United States; WTA International; Hard, outdoor 30 July –5 August 2018	–	1R	(Ukraine) Anhelina Kalinina (Q)	143	Withdrew	N/A
Canadian Open; Montreal, Canada; WTA Premier 5 Hard, outdoor 6–12 August 2018	–	1R	Bye			
Canadian Open; Montreal, Canada; WTA Premier 5 Hard, outdoor 6–12 August 2018	43	2R	(Belarus) Aryna Sabalenka	39	Loss	7–5, 2–6, 6–7^{(4–7)}
Cincinnati Open; Cincinnati, United States; WTA Premier 5 Hard, outdoor 13–19 August 2018	–	1R	Bye			
Cincinnati Open; Cincinnati, United States; WTA Premier 5 Hard, outdoor 13–19 August 2018	44	2R	(Netherlands) Kiki Bertens	17	Loss	4–6 retired
U.S. Open; New York City, United States; Grand Slam; Hard, outdoor 27 August – 9 September 2018	45	1R	(Australia) Samantha Stosur	64	Win	6–3, 6–2
U.S. Open; New York City, United States; Grand Slam; Hard, outdoor 27 August – 9 September 2018	46	2R	(Ukraine) Lesia Tsurenko	36	Loss	4–6, 2–6
Pan Pacific Open; Tokyo, Japan; WTA Premier; Hard, indoor 17–23 September 2018	–	1R	Bye			
Pan Pacific Open; Tokyo, Japan; WTA Premier; Hard, indoor 17–23 September 2018	47	2R	(Italy) Camila Giorgi	37	Loss	2–6, 6–2, 4–6
Wuhan Open; Wuhan, China; WTA Premier 5 Hard, outdoor 23–29 September 2018	–	1R	Bye			
Wuhan Open; Wuhan, China; WTA Premier 5 Hard, outdoor 23–29 September 2018	48	2R	(Sweden) Rebecca Peterson (Q)	61	Win	6–4, 6–1
Wuhan Open; Wuhan, China; WTA Premier 5 Hard, outdoor 23–29 September 2018	49	3R	(Puerto Rico) Monica Puig (Q)	51	Loss	6–7^{(10–12)}, 5–7
China Open; Beijing, China; WTA Premier Mandatory; Hard, outdoor 1–7 October 2018	50	1R	(Switzerland) Belinda Bencic	42	Win	6–2, 6–3
China Open; Beijing, China; WTA Premier Mandatory; Hard, outdoor 1–7 October 2018	51	2R	(Croatia) Petra Martić	37	Win	7–5, 6–3
China Open; Beijing, China; WTA Premier Mandatory; Hard, outdoor 1–7 October 2018	52	3R	(Estonia) Anett Kontaveit	21	Win	7–5, 6–4
China Open; Beijing, China; WTA Premier Mandatory; Hard, outdoor 1–7 October 2018	53	QF	(Czech Republic) Kateřina Siniaková (Q)	40	Win	6–2, 6–2
China Open; Beijing, China; WTA Premier Mandatory; Hard, outdoor 1–7 October 2018	54	SF	(China) Wang Qiang (WC)	28	Win	6–1, 6–3
China Open; Beijing, China; WTA Premier Mandatory; Hard, outdoor 1–7 October 2018	55	W	(Latvia) Anastasija Sevastova	20	Win (3)	6–3, 6–3
WTA Finals; Kallang, Singapore; Year-end championships Hard, indoor 21–28 October 2018	56	RR	(Czech Republic) Karolína Plíšková (7)	8	Loss	2–6, 4–6
WTA Finals; Kallang, Singapore; Year-end championships Hard, indoor 21–28 October 2018	57	RR	(Czech Republic) Petra Kvitová (4)	5	Win	7–5, 3–6, 6–2
WTA Finals; Kallang, Singapore; Year-end championships Hard, indoor 21–28 October 2018	58	RR	(Ukraine) Elina Svitolina (6)	7	Loss	7–5, 5–7, 3–6

== Tournament schedule ==
=== Singles schedule ===
Wozniacki's 2018 singles tournament schedule is as follows:

Date	Tournament	Location	Category	Surface	2017 result	2017 points	2018 points	Result
1 January – 7 January	Auckland Open	New Zealand	International	Hard	QF	60	180	Final lost to (Germany) Julia Görges; 4–6, 6–7^{(2–7)}
15 January – 28 January	Australian Open	Australia	Grand Slam	Hard	3R	130	2000	Winner defeated (Romania) Simona Halep; 7–6^{(7–2)}, 3–6, 6–4
29 January – 4 February	St. Petersburg Ladies' Trophy	Russia	Premier	Hard (i)	DNP	0	100	Quarterfinals lost to (Russia) Daria Kasatkina; 6–7^{(2–7)}, 3–6
12 February – 17 February	Qatar Open	Qatar	Premier 5 (Note: Qatar Total Open was a Premier tournament in 2017.)	Hard	F	305	350	Semifinals lost to (Czech Republic) Petra Kvitová; 6–3, 6–7^{(3–7)}, 5–7
5 March – 18 March	Indian Wells Open	United States	Premier Mandatory	Hard	QF	215	120	Fourth round lost to (Russia) Daria Kasatkina; 4–6, 5–7
19 March – 1 April	Miami Open	United States	Premier Mandatory	Hard	F	650	10	Second round lost to (Puerto Rico) Monica Puig; 6–0, 4–6, 4–6
23 April – 29 April	İstanbul Cup	Turkey	International	Clay	DNP	0	60	Quarterfinals lost to (France) Pauline Parmentier; 6–4, 3–6 retired
7 May – 13 May	Madrid Open	Spain	Premier Mandatory	Clay	2R	65	120	Third round lost to (Netherlands) Kiki Bertens; 2–6, 2–6
14 May – 20 May	Italian Open	Italy	Premier 5	Clay	DNP	0	190	Quarterfinals lost to (Estonia) Anett Kontaveit; 3–6, 1–6
27 May – 10 June	French Open	France	Grand Slam	Clay	QF	430	240	Fourth round lost to (Russia) Daria Kasatkina; 6–7^{(5–7)}, 3–6
24 June – 30 June	Eastbourne International	United Kingdom	Premier	Grass	F	305	470	Winner defeated (Belarus) Aryna Sabalenka; 7–5, 7–6^{(7–5)}
2 July – 15 July	Wimbledon Championships	United Kingdom	Grand Slam	Grass	4R	240	70	Second round lost to (Russia) Ekaterina Makarova; 4–6, 6–1, 5–7
30 July – 5 August	Washington Open	United States	International	Hard	DNP	0	0	Withdrew due to leg injury
6 August – 12 August	Canadian Open	Canada	Premier 5	Hard	F	585	1	Second round lost to (Belarus) Aryna Sabalenka; 7–5, 2–6, 6–7^{(4–7)}
13 August – 19 August	Cincinnati Open	United States	Premier 5	Hard	QF	190	1	Second round lost to (Netherlands) Kiki Bertens; 4–6 retired
27 August – 9 September	U.S. Open	United States	Grand Slam	Hard	2R	70	70	Second round lost to (Ukraine) Lesia Tsurenko; 4–6, 2–6
17 September – 23 September	Pan Pacific Open	Japan	Premier	Hard (i)	W	470	1	Second round lost to (Italy) Camila Giorgi; 2–6, 6–2, 4–6
13 August – 19 August	Wuhan Open	China	Premier 5	Hard	2R	1	105	Third round lost to (Puerto Rico) Monica Puig; 6–7^{(10–12)}, 5–7
1 October – 7 October	China Open	China	Premier Mandatory	Hard	3R	120	1000	Winner defeated (Latvia) Anastasija Sevastova; 6–3, 6–3
21 October – 28 October	WTA Finals	Singapore	Year-end Championships	Hard (i)	W	1375	500	Failed to advance into the semifinals 1 won & 2 losses
Road to Singapore points						4640	5086	▲446 difference
Total year-end points						6015	5586	▼429 difference

== Yearly records ==
=== Head-to-head matchups ===
Surface	Win–loss	Win%
**Hard**	26–12	68.42%
**Clay**	9–4	69.23%
**Grass**	6–1	85.71%
Overall	41–17	70.69%

Players are ordered by letter.

Player	Rank	Tournament	Surface	Date	W/L	W–L	CWR
(Belarus) Aliaksandra Sasnovich	49	Indian Wells Masters, Indian Wells, United States	Hard	March 2, 2018	Win	1–0	2
(Belgium) Alison Van Uytvanck	49	Italian Open, Rome, Italy	Clay	May 15, 2018	Win	1–0	2
(Russia) Anastasia Potapova	235	St. Petersburg Ladies' Trophy, Saint Petersburg, Russia	Hard (i)	February 1, 2018	Win	1–0	1
(Latvia) Anastasija Sevastova	20	Italian Open, Rome, Italy	Clay	May 16, 2018	Win	2–0	2
(Latvia) Anastasija Sevastova	20	China Open, Beijing, China	Hard	October 7, 2018	Win	2–0	2
(Estonia) Anett Kontaveit	23	Italian Open, Rome, Italy	Clay	May 18, 2018	**Loss**	1–1	2
(Estonia) Anett Kontaveit	21	China Open, Beijing, China	Hard	October 4, 2018	Win	1–1	2
(Germany) Angelique Kerber	**9**	Qatar Open, Doha, Qatar	Hard	February 16, 2018	Win	2–0	1
(Germany) Angelique Kerber	11	Eastbourne International, Eastbourne, United Kingdom	Grass	June 29, 2018	Win	2–0	2
(Belarus) Aryna Sabalenka	45	Eastbourne International, Eastbourne, United Kingdom	Grass	June 30, 2018	Win	1–1	2
(Belarus) Aryna Sabalenka	39	Canadian Open, Toronto, Canada	Hard	August 9, 2018	**Loss**	1–1	2
(Australia) Ashleigh Barty	18	Mutua Madrid Open, Madrid, Spain	Clay	May 7, 2018	Win	2–0	2
(Australia) Ashleigh Barty	17	Eastbourne International, Eastbourne, United Kingdom	Grass	June 28, 2018	Win	2–0	2
(Switzerland) Belinda Bencic	42	China Open, Beijing, China	Hard	October 1, 2018	Win	1–0	2
(Italy) Camila Giorgi	56	Eastbourne International, Eastbourne, United Kingdom	Grass	June 25, 2018	Win	1–1	2
(Italy) Camila Giorgi	37	Pan Pacific Open, Tokyo, Japan	Hard (i)	September 20, 2018	**Loss**	1–1	2
(Spain) Carla Suárez Navarro	39	Australian Open, Melbourne, Australia	Hard	January 23, 2018	Win	1–0	2
(United States) Danielle Collins	41	French Open, Paris, France	Clay	May 28, 2018	Win	1–0	2
(Australia) Daria Gavrilova	24	Mutua Madrid Open, Madrid, Spain	Clay	May 6, 2018	Win	1–0	2
(Russia) Daria Kasatkina	23	St. Petersburg Ladies' Trophy, Saint Petersburg, Russia	Hard (i)	February 2, 2018	**Loss**	0–3	1
(Russia) Daria Kasatkina	19	Indian Wells Masters, Indian Wells, United States	Hard	March 14, 2018	**Loss**	0–3	2
(Russia) Daria Kasatkina	14	French Open, Paris, France	Clay	June 4, 2018 (Note: The match originally began on June 3rd, but was put off to the second day due to getting dark.)	**Loss**	0–3	2
(Russia) Ekaterina Alexandrova	82	İstanbul Cup, Istanbul, Turkey	Clay	April 24, 2018	Win	1–0	2
(Russia) Ekaterina Makarova	35	Wimbledon Championships, London, United Kingdom	Grass	July 4, 2018	**Loss**	0–1	2
(Ukraine) Elina Svitolina	**7**	WTA Finals, Kallang, Singapore	Hard (i)	October 25, 2018	**Loss**	0–1	3
(Belgium) Elise Mertens	37	Australian Open, Melbourne, Australia	Hard	January 25, 2018	Win	1–0	2
(Spain) Georgina García Pérez	186	French Open, Paris, France	Clay	May 30, 2018	Win	1–0	2
(Croatia) Jana Fett	119	Australian Open, Melbourne, Australia	Hard	January 17, 2018	Win	1–0	2
(United Kingdom) Johanna Konta	22	Eastbourne International, Eastbourne, United Kingdom	Grass	June 27, 2018	Win	1–0	2
(Germany) Julia Görges	14	Auckland Open, Auckland, New Zealand	Hard	January 7, 2018	**Loss**	0–1	3
(Czech Republic) Kateřina Siniaková	40	China Open, Beijing, China	Hard	October 5, 2018	Win	1–0	2
(Czech Republic) Karolína Plíšková	**8**	WTA Finals, Kallang, Singapore	Hard (i)	October 21, 2018	**Loss**	0–1	2
(Netherlands) Kiki Bertens	32	Australian Open, Melbourne, Australia	Hard	January 19, 2018	Win	1–2	2
(Netherlands) Kiki Bertens	20	Mutua Madrid Open, Madrid, Spain	Clay	May 9, 2018	**Loss**	1–2	2
(Netherlands) Kiki Bertens	17	Cincinnati Open, Cincinnati, United States	Hard	August 15, 2018	**Loss**	1–2	2
(Spain) Lara Arruabarrena	80	Indian Wells Masters, Indian Wells, United States	Hard	March 3, 2018	Win	1–0	2
(Ukraine) Lesia Tsurenko	36	U.S. Open, New York City, United States	Hard	August 30, 2018	Win	0–1	2
(United States) Madison Brengle	85	Auckland Open, Auckland, New Zealand	Hard	January 2, 2018	Win	1–0	3
(Slovakia) Magdaléna Rybáriková	21	Australian Open, Melbourne, Australia	Hard	January 21, 2018	Win	1–0	2
(Romania) Mihaela Buzărnescu	44	Australian Open, Melbourne, Australia	Hard	January 15, 2018	Win	1–0	2
(Romania) Monica Niculescu	92	Qatar Open, Doha, Qatar	Hard	February 15, 2018	Win	1–0	1
(Puerto Rico) Monica Puig	82	Miami Open, Miami, United States	Hard	March 24, 2018	**Loss**	0–2	2
(Puerto Rico) Monica Puig	51	Wuhan Open, Wuhan, China	Hard	September 26, 2018	**Loss**	0–2	2
(France) Pauline Parmentier	122	İstanbul Cup, Istanbul, Turkey	Clay	April 27, 2018	**Loss**	1–1	2
(France) Pauline Parmentier	74	French Open, Paris, France	Clay	June 1, 2018	Win	1–1	2
(Czech Republic) Petra Kvitová	21	Qatar Open, Doha, Qatar	Hard	February 17, 2018	**Loss**	1–1	1
(Czech Republic) Petra Kvitová	**5**	WTA Finals, Kallang, Singapore	Hard (i)	October 23, 2018	Win	1–1	3
(Croatia) Petra Martić	90	Auckland Open, Auckland, New Zealand	Hard	January 3, 2018	Win	2–0	3
(Croatia) Petra Martić	37	China Open, Beijing, China	Hard	October 3, 2018	Win	2–0	2
(Sweden) Rebecca Peterson	61	Wuhan Open, Wuhan, China	Hard	September 25, 2018	Win	1–0	2
(United States) Sachia Vickery	122	Auckland Open, Auckland, New Zealand	Hard	January 6, 2018	Win	1–0	3
(Australia) Samantha Stosur	64	U.S. Open, New York City, United States	Hard	August 28, 2018	Win	1–0	2
(Italy) Sara Errani	93	İstanbul Cup, Istanbul, Turkey	Clay	April 26, 2018	Win	1–0	2
(Romania) Simona Halep	**1**	Australian Open, Melbourne, Australia	Hard	January 27, 2018	Win	1–0	2
(United States) Sofia Kenin	108	Auckland Open, Auckland, New Zealand	Hard	January 6, 2018	Win	1–0	3
(United States) Varvara Lepchenko	97	Wimbledon Championships, London, United Kingdom	Grass	July 2, 2018	Win	1–0	2
(China) Wang Qiang	28	China Open, Beijing, China	Hard	October 6, 2018	Win	1–0	2

=== Top 10 wins ===
#	Player	Rank	Tournament	Surface	Round	Score	CWR
1.	(Romania) Simona Halep	**1**	Australian Open, Melbourne, Australia	Hard	Final	7–6^{(7–2)}, 3–6, 6–4	**2**
2.	(Germany) Angelique Kerber	**9**	Qatar Open, Doha, Qatar	Hard	Quarterfinals	7–6^{(7–4)}, 1–6, 6–3	**1**
3.	(Czech Republic) Petra Kvitová	**5**	WTA Finals, Kallang, Singapore	Hard (i)	Round robin	7–5, 3–6, 6–2	**3**

=== Finals ===
Singles: 4 (3 titles, 1 runner-up)

Legend Grand Slam tournaments (1–0) WTA Tour Championships (0–0) Premier Mandatory & Premier 5 (1–0) Premier (1–0) International (0–1)	Finals by surface Hard (2–1) Clay (0–0) Grass (1–0)	Titles by setting Outdoors (3–1) Indoors (0–0)

Result	W–L	Date	Tournament	Tier	Surface	Opponent	Score
Loss	0–1	Jan 2018	Auckland Open, New Zealand	International	Hard	(Germany) Julia Görges	4–6, 6–7^{(4–7)}
Win	1–1	Jan 2018	Australian Open, Australia	Grand Slam	Hard	(Romania) Simona Halep	7–6^{(7–2)}, 3–6, 6–4
Win	2–1	Jun 2018	Eastbourne International, United Kingdom	Premier	Grass	(Belarus) Aryna Sabalenka	7–5, 7–6^{(7–5)}
Win	3–1	Oct 2018	China Open, China	Premier M	Hard	(Latvia) Anastasija Sevastova	6–3, 6–3

=== Earnings ===
The tournaments won by Wozniacki are in boldface.

#	Tournament	Prize money	Year-to-date
1.	Auckland Open	US$21,400	$21,400
2.	**Australian Open**	A$4,000,000	$3,056,344
3.	St. Petersburg Ladies' Trophy	$21,010	$3,077,354
4.	Qatar Open	$147,750	$3,225,104
5.	Indian Wells Masters	$88,135	$3,313,239
6.	Miami Open	$25,465	$3,338,704
7.	İstanbul Cup	$6,175	$3,344,879
8.	Mutua Madrid Open	€77,575	$3,436,463
9.	Italian Open	€58,313	$3,508,771
10.	French Open	€222,000	$3,769,896
11.	**Eastbourne International**	$140,400	$3,928,666
12.	Wimbledon Championships	£63,000	$4,015,439
–	Washington Open	—N/a	$4,015,439
13.	Canadian Open	$8,015	$4,030,299
14.	Cincinnati Open	$7,745	$4,045,479
15.	US Open	$93,000	$4,138,479
16.	Toray Pan Pacific Open	$11,265	$4,149,744
17.	Wuhan Open	$13,790	$4,178,474
18.	**China Open**	$1,525,245	$5,703,719
19.	WTA Finals	$304,000	$6,007,719
**Bonus Pool**		$650,000 (Note: Bonus prize money for finishing as World No. 3 in 2017 season.)	$6,657,719
**Total prize money**			**$6,657,719**

== See also ==
- 2018 WTA Tour
- 2018 Angelique Kerber tennis season
- 2018 Simona Halep tennis season
- Caroline Wozniacki career statistics
- List of career achievements by Caroline Wozniacki
- List of WTA number 1 ranked tennis players
- WTA Tour records
