= 2018 Simona Halep tennis season =

2018 tennis season about Romanian player Simona Halep

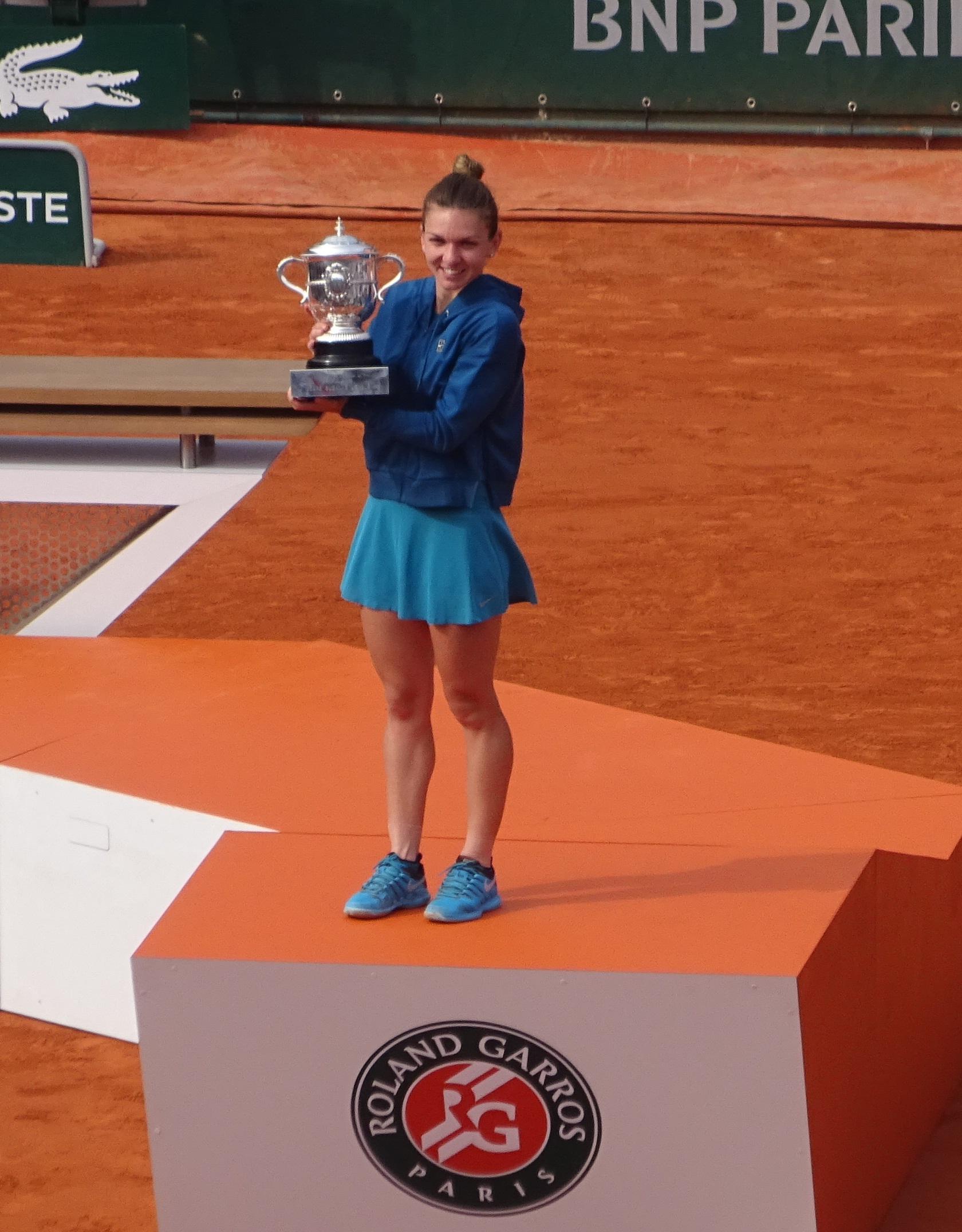
- Simona Halep at the 2018 Roland Garros
- Full name: Simona Halep
- Country: Romania
- Calendar prize money: $6,005,336

Singles
- Season record: 46–11
- Calendar titles: 3
- Current ranking: No. 1
- Ranking change from previous year: Steady

Grand Slam & significant results
- Australian Open: F
- French Open: W
- Wimbledon: 3R
- US Open: 1R

Injuries
- Injuries: Foot injury (February) Back injury (September)
- Last updated on: 30 September 2018.

The 2018 Simona Halep tennis season officially began on 1 January 2018 with the start of the 2018 WTA Tour. Simona Halep entered the season as the No. 1 ranked player in the world.

== Year in detail ==
=== Early hard court season and Australian Open ===
==== Shenzhen Open ====
Halep began her season at the Shenzhen Open. She was the top seed and advanced to the final after successfully defeating Nicole Gibbs, Duan Yingying, Aryna Sabalenka and Irina-Camelia Begu. She defeated her in the opponent's final that eliminated her one year ago in R16 in three sets, Kateřina Siniaková.

==== Australian Open ====
Her next tournament was the Australian Open. She was the main draw favorite for the first time in a Grand Slam career. She defeated Destanee Aiava in straight sets, still in the first round injured at the right leg's ankle. She then beat Eugenie Bouchard, former world rank 5, Lauren Davis in an epic match that lasted 3 hours and 45 minutes taking the third set 15–13. The match equaled the Australian Open record for most games played in a women's singles draw match at 48 — equaling Chanda Rubin's 1996 quarterfinal win over Arantxa Sánchez Vicario. She went on to defeat Naomi Osaka in the 4th round in straight sets and former world No. 1 Karolína Plíšková in the quarter-finals, also in straight sets. She faced former world No. 1 and 2016 Australian Open champion Angelique Kerber in the semi-finals. In the 3rd set, she saved two match points and went on to win, qualifying for the Australian Open final for the first time.

In the final, Halep was defeated by Caroline Wozniacki in three sets.

After Australian Open fell to second place for four weeks.

==== Qatar Ladies Open ====
Halep then played the Qatar Open, where she received a bye in the first round. She defeated Ekaterina Makarova with a bagel in the second set. The Australian Open finalist put together a dominant performance and needed just 58 minutes. She then defeated Anastasija Sevastova, seed 13 in straight sets. Her next opponent was American, CiCi Bellis. The first set was won by a bagel. In semifinal should have played with, but withdrawing prior to her match against Garbiñe Muguruza because of a right foot injury. Nevertheless, despite not playing the next week, she returned to the top spot.

=== March sunshine events ===
==== Indian Wells Masters ====
Halep then played the Indian Wells Masters, where she received a bye in the first round. She defeated Kristýna Plíšková in straight sets, Caroline Dolehide in three sets, Wang Qiang in straight sets and Petra Martić in three sets, in straight sets before she lost to Naomi Osaka again in the semifinal.

==== Miami Open ====
Halep then entered the Miami Open, where she also received a bye in the first round. In round 2 beat French Océane Dodin in three sets. However, she lost in the third round to 2012 champion Agnieszka Radwańska.

=== European clay court season ===
==== Fed Cup, World Group-Play Off ====
She kicked off her clay court campaign by leading Romania against Switzerland in their World Group Play-off tie in Cluj-Napoca. By virtue of a 3–1 victory with Halep going 2–0 in the singles rubbers, they secured a place in the 2019 World Group for the first time in two years.

==== Porsche Tennis Grand Prix ====
After Fed Cup, Halep went to Stuttgart where she knocked a victory on Magdaléna Rybáriková before losing to quarters at CoCo Vandeweghe

==== Mutua Madrid Open ====
Halep then played the Madrid Open. She defeated Ekaterina Makarova, giving up just one game, Elise Mertens with a bagel in first set, Kristýna Plíšková and advanced into the quarterfinals. However, she lost Karolína Plíšková in straight sets, after winning the last two editions and after having only 15 victories in a row.

==== Italian Open ====
Halep's next tournament was the Italian Open, where she received a bye in the first round. She defeated Naomi Osaka, winner at Indian Wells, yielding a single game. In the third round should have played with Madison Keys, but the latter had to retire due to a shoulder injury, so Simona qualified in the quarter-finals without playing in round 3. In the quarter-finals defeated Caroline Garcia, the 7th World Player, with only 5 games. In semifinal has marred one of her rivals Russian, Maria Sharapova winning editions of 2011, 2012 and 2015 in an epic match. Simona won in 3 sets after losing the first set. In the final she lost to the same opponent last year, Elina Svitolina. She lost the first set to 0.

==== French Open ====
In the French Open, Halep was the 1st seed for the second time in a Grand Slam. In the first round, she defeated Alison Riske losing the first set. She was forced to compete on the 4th day on Wednesday after the match was postponed due to the dark. In the second round, she easily defeated the American wildcard Taylor Townsend. Her opponent in the third round was the 2014 semi-finalist, Andrea Petkovic. Halep defeated the German in straight sets, not losing a game in the second set. Her next opponent was the 16th seed Elise Mertens, who she defeated in 59 minutes, dropping just 3 games. In the quarterfinals, she met Kerber in a rematch of the Australian Open semifinal, and defeated her once again in three sets.. In the semi-final she met former world No. 1 and French Open champion Garbiñe Muguruza, and defeated her in straight sets. In the final, Halep met Sloane Stephens, and came back from a set deficit to win her first Grand Slam title, on her fourth attempt. She became the first Romanian woman to win a Grand Slam title since Virginia Ruzici won the French Open in 1978.

== All matches ==
Key
W	F	SF	QF	#R	RR	Q#	P#	DNQ	A	Z#	PO	G	S	B	NMS	NTI	P	NH

(W) winner; (F) finalist; (SF) semifinalist; (QF) quarterfinalist; (#R) rounds 4, 3, 2, 1; (RR) round-robin stage; (Q#) qualification round; (P#) preliminary round; (DNQ) did not qualify; (A) absent; (Z#) Davis/Fed Cup Zonal Group (with number indication) or (PO) play-off; (G) gold, (S) silver or (B) bronze Olympic/Paralympic medal; (NMS) not a Masters tournament; (NTI) not a Tier I tournament; (P) postponed; (NH) not held; (SR) strike rate (events won / competed); (W–L) win–loss record.
To avoid confusion and double counting, these charts are updated at the conclusion of a tournament or when the player's participation has ended.

=== Singles matches ===
Tournament	Match	Round	Opponent	Rank	Result	Score
Shenzhen Open; Shenzhen, China; WTA International; Hard, outdoor 1–7 January 2018	1	1R	(United States) Nicole Gibbs	110	Win	6–4, 6–1
Shenzhen Open; Shenzhen, China; WTA International; Hard, outdoor 1–7 January 2018	2	2R	(China) Duan Yingying	91	Win	3−6, 6–1, 6–2
Shenzhen Open; Shenzhen, China; WTA International; Hard, outdoor 1–7 January 2018	3	QF	(Belarus) Aryna Sabalenka	73	Win	6–2, 6–2
Shenzhen Open; Shenzhen, China; WTA International; Hard, outdoor 1–7 January 2018	4	SF	(Romania) Irina-Camelia Begu (4)	43	Win	6–1, 6–4
Shenzhen Open; Shenzhen, China; WTA International; Hard, outdoor 1–7 January 2018	5	W	(Czech Republic) Kateřina Siniaková (6)	47	Win (1)	6–1, 2–6, 6–0
Australian Open; Melbourne, Australia; Grand Slam; Hard, outdoor 15–28 January 2018	6	1R	(Australia) Destanee Aiava (WC)	193	Win	7–6^{(7–5)}, 6–1
Australian Open; Melbourne, Australia; Grand Slam; Hard, outdoor 15–28 January 2018	7	2R	(Canada) Eugenie Bouchard	112	Win	6–2, 6–2
Australian Open; Melbourne, Australia; Grand Slam; Hard, outdoor 15–28 January 2018	8	3R	(United States) Lauren Davis	76	Win	4–6, 6–4, 15–13
Australian Open; Melbourne, Australia; Grand Slam; Hard, outdoor 15–28 January 2018	9	4R	(Japan) Naomi Osaka	72	Win	6–3, 6–2
Australian Open; Melbourne, Australia; Grand Slam; Hard, outdoor 15–28 January 2018	10	QF	(Czech Republic) Karolína Plíšková (6)	6	Win	6–3, 6–2
Australian Open; Melbourne, Australia; Grand Slam; Hard, outdoor 15–28 January 2018	11	SF	(Germany) Angelique Kerber (21)	16	Win	6–3, 4–6, 9–7
Australian Open; Melbourne, Australia; Grand Slam; Hard, outdoor 15–28 January 2018	12	F	(Denmark) Caroline Wozniacki (2)	2	Loss (1)	6–7^{(2–7)}, 6–3, 4–6
Qatar Open; Doha, Qatar; WTA Premier 5 Hard, outdoor 12–17 February 2018	–	1R	Bye			
Qatar Open; Doha, Qatar; WTA Premier 5 Hard, outdoor 12–17 February 2018	13	2R	(Russia) Ekaterina Makarova	36	Win	6–1, 6–0
Qatar Open; Doha, Qatar; WTA Premier 5 Hard, outdoor 12–17 February 2018	14	3R	(Latvia) Anastasija Sevastova (13)	15	Win	6–4, 6–3
Qatar Open; Doha, Qatar; WTA Premier 5 Hard, outdoor 12–17 February 2018	15	QF	(United States) CiCi Bellis	48	Win	6–0, 6–4
Qatar Open; Doha, Qatar; WTA Premier 5 Hard, outdoor 12–17 February 2018	-	SF	(Spain) Garbiñe Muguruza (4)	4	Withdrew	N/A
Indian Wells Open; Indian Wells, United States; WTA Premier Mandatory; Hard, outdoor 5–18 March 2018	–	1R	Bye			
Indian Wells Open; Indian Wells, United States; WTA Premier Mandatory; Hard, outdoor 5–18 March 2018	16	2R	(Czech Republic) Kristýna Plíšková	77	Win	6–4, 6–4
Indian Wells Open; Indian Wells, United States; WTA Premier Mandatory; Hard, outdoor 5–18 March 2018	17	3R	(United States) Caroline Dolehide (WC)	165	Win	1–6, 7–6^{(7–3)}, 6–2
Indian Wells Open; Indian Wells, United States; WTA Premier Mandatory; Hard, outdoor 5–18 March 2018	18	4R	(China) Wang Qiang	55	Win	7–5, 6–1
Indian Wells Open; Indian Wells, United States; WTA Premier Mandatory; Hard, outdoor 5–18 March 2018	19	QF	(Croatia) Petra Martić	51	Win	6–4, 6–7^{(5–7)}, 6–3
Indian Wells Open; Indian Wells, United States; WTA Premier Mandatory; Hard, outdoor 5–18 March 2018	20	SF	(Japan) Naomi Osaka	44	Loss	3–6, 0–6
Miami Open; Miami, United States; WTA Premier Mandatory; Hard, outdoor 19 March – 1 April 2018	–	1R	Bye			
Miami Open; Miami, United States; WTA Premier Mandatory; Hard, outdoor 19 March – 1 April 2018	21	2R	(France) Océane Dodin (WC)	98	Win	3–6, 6–3, 7–5
Miami Open; Miami, United States; WTA Premier Mandatory; Hard, outdoor 19 March – 1 April 2018	22	3R	(Poland) Agnieszka Radwańska (30)	32	Loss	6–3, 2–6, 3–6
Fed Cup WG Play-offs: Switzerland vs. Romania; Cluj-Napoca, Romania; Fed Cup; Clay, indoor 21–22 April 2018	23	-	(Switzerland) Viktorija Golubic	115	Win	6–3, 1–6, 6–1
Fed Cup WG Play-offs: Switzerland vs. Romania; Cluj-Napoca, Romania; Fed Cup; Clay, indoor 21–22 April 2018	24	-	(Switzerland) Patty Schnyder	149	Win	6–2, 6–1
Stuttgart Open; Stuttgart, Germany; WTA Premier; Clay, indoor 23–29 April 2018	–	1R	Bye			
Stuttgart Open; Stuttgart, Germany; WTA Premier; Clay, indoor 23–29 April 2018	25	2R	(Slovakia) Magdaléna Rybáriková	18	Win	4–6, 6–2, 6–3
Stuttgart Open; Stuttgart, Germany; WTA Premier; Clay, indoor 23–29 April 2018	26	QF	(United States) CoCo Vandeweghe (WC)	16	Loss	4–6, 1–6
Madrid Open; Madrid, Spain; WTA Premier Mandatory; Clay, outdoor 7–13 May 2018	27	1R	(Russia) Ekaterina Makarova	33	Win	6–1, 6–0
Madrid Open; Madrid, Spain; WTA Premier Mandatory; Clay, outdoor 7–13 May 2018	28	2R	(Belgium) Elise Mertens	16	Win	6–0, 6–3
Madrid Open; Madrid, Spain; WTA Premier Mandatory; Clay, outdoor 7–13 May 2018	29	3R	(Czech Republic) Kristýna Plíšková (Q)	94	Win	6–4, 6–1
Madrid Open; Madrid, Spain; WTA Premier Mandatory; Clay, outdoor 7–13 May 2018	30	QF	(Czech Republic) Karolína Plíšková (6)	6	Loss	4–6, 3–6
Italian Open; Rome, Italy; WTA Premier 5 Clay, outdoor 14–20 May 2018	–	1R	Bye			
Italian Open; Rome, Italy; WTA Premier 5 Clay, outdoor 14–20 May 2018	31	2R	(Japan) Naomi Osaka	21	Win	6–1, 6–0
Italian Open; Rome, Italy; WTA Premier 5 Clay, outdoor 14–20 May 2018	-	3R	(United States) Madison Keys (13)	14	Win	w/o
Italian Open; Rome, Italy; WTA Premier 5 Clay, outdoor 14–20 May 2018	32	QF	(France) Caroline Garcia (7)	7	Win	6–2, 6–3
Italian Open; Rome, Italy; WTA Premier 5 Clay, outdoor 14–20 May 2018	33	SF	(Russia) Maria Sharapova	40	Win	4–6, 6–1, 6–4
Italian Open; Rome, Italy; WTA Premier 5 Clay, outdoor 14–20 May 2018	34	F	(Ukraine) Elina Svitolina (4)	4	Loss (2)	0–6, 4–6
French Open; Paris, France; Grand Slam; Clay, outdoor 27 May – 10 June 2018	35	1R	(United States) Alison Riske	83	Win	2–6, 6–1, 6–1
French Open; Paris, France; Grand Slam; Clay, outdoor 27 May – 10 June 2018	36	2R	(United States) Taylor Townsend (WC)	72	Win	6–3, 6–1
French Open; Paris, France; Grand Slam; Clay, outdoor 27 May – 10 June 2018	37	3R	(Germany) Andrea Petkovic	107	Win	7–5, 6–0
French Open; Paris, France; Grand Slam; Clay, outdoor 27 May – 10 June 2018	38	4R	(Belgium) Elise Mertens (16)	16	Win	6–2, 6–1
French Open; Paris, France; Grand Slam; Clay, outdoor 27 May – 10 June 2018	39	QF	(Germany) Angelique Kerber (12)	12	Win	6–7^{(3–7)}, 6–3, 6–2
French Open; Paris, France; Grand Slam; Clay, outdoor 27 May – 10 June 2018	40	SF	(Spain) Garbiñe Muguruza (3)	3	Win	6–1, 6–4
French Open; Paris, France; Grand Slam; Clay, outdoor 27 May – 10 June 2018	41	W	(United States) Sloane Stephens (10)	10	Win (2)	3–6, 6–4, 6–1
Wimbledon Championships; London, United Kingdom; Grand Slam; Grass, outdoor 2–15 July 2018	42	1R	(Japan) Kurumi Nara	100	Win	6–2, 6–4
Wimbledon Championships; London, United Kingdom; Grand Slam; Grass, outdoor 2–15 July 2018	43	2R	(China) Zheng Saisai	126	Win	7–5, 6–0
Wimbledon Championships; London, United Kingdom; Grand Slam; Grass, outdoor 2–15 July 2018	44	3R	(Chinese Taipei) Hsieh Su-wei	48	Loss	6–3, 4–6, 5–7
Canadian Open; Montreal, Canada; WTA Premier 5 Hard, outdoor 6–12 August 2018	–	1R	Bye			
Canadian Open; Montreal, Canada; WTA Premier 5 Hard, outdoor 6–12 August 2018	45	2R	(Russia) Anastasia Pavlyuchenkova	28	Win	7–6^{(11–9)}, 4–6, 7–5
Canadian Open; Montreal, Canada; WTA Premier 5 Hard, outdoor 6–12 August 2018	46	3R	(United States) Venus Williams (13)	14	Win	6–2, 6–2
Canadian Open; Montreal, Canada; WTA Premier 5 Hard, outdoor 6–12 August 2018	47	QF	(France) Caroline Garcia (6)	6	Win	7–5, 6–1
Canadian Open; Montreal, Canada; WTA Premier 5 Hard, outdoor 6–12 August 2018	48	SF	(Australia) Ashleigh Barty (15)	16	Win	6–4, 6–1
Canadian Open; Montreal, Canada; WTA Premier 5 Hard, outdoor 6–12 August 2018	49	W	(United States) Sloane Stephens (3)	3	Win (3)	7–6^{(8–6)}, 3–6, 6–4
Cincinnati Open; Cincinnati, United States; WTA Premier 5 Hard, outdoor 13–19 August 2018	–	1R	Bye			
Cincinnati Open; Cincinnati, United States; WTA Premier 5 Hard, outdoor 13–19 August 2018	50	2R	(Australia) Ajla Tomljanović (Q)	58	Win	4–6, 6–3, 6–3
Cincinnati Open; Cincinnati, United States; WTA Premier 5 Hard, outdoor 13–19 August 2018	51	3R	(Australia) Ashleigh Barty (16)	16	Win	7–5, 6–4
Cincinnati Open; Cincinnati, United States; WTA Premier 5 Hard, outdoor 13–19 August 2018	52	QF	(Ukraine) Lesia Tsurenko	44	Win	6–4, 6–1
Cincinnati Open; Cincinnati, United States; WTA Premier 5 Hard, outdoor 13–19 August 2018	53	SF	(Belarus) Aryna Sabalenka	34	Win	6–3, 6–4
Cincinnati Open; Cincinnati, United States; WTA Premier 5 Hard, outdoor 13–19 August 2018	54	F	(Netherlands) Kiki Bertens	17	Loss (3)	6–2, 6–7^{(6–8)}, 2–6
Connecticut Open; New Haven, United States; WTA Premier; Hard, outdoor 20–26 August 2018	–	1R	Bye			
Connecticut Open; New Haven, United States; WTA Premier; Hard, outdoor 20–26 August 2018	–	2R	(Italy) Camila Giorgi	45	Withdrew	N/A
U.S. Open; New York City, United States; Grand Slam; Hard, outdoor 27 August – 9 September 2018	55	1R	(Estonia) Kaia Kanepi	44	Loss	2–6, 4–6
Wuhan Open; Wuhan, China; WTA Premier 5 Hard, outdoor 23–29 September 2018	–	1R	Bye			
Wuhan Open; Wuhan, China; WTA Premier 5 Hard, outdoor 23–29 September 2018	56	2R	(Slovakia) Dominika Cibulková	31	Loss	0–6, 5–7
China Open; Beijing, China; WTA Premier Mandatory; Hard, outdoor 1–7 October 2018	57	1R	(Tunisia) Ons Jabeur (Q)	116	Loss	1–6, retired
Kremlin Cup; Moscow, Russia; WTA Premier; Hard, indoor 15–21 October 2018
Kremlin Cup; Moscow, Russia; WTA Premier; Hard, indoor 15–21 October 2018	–	1R	Bye			
Kremlin Cup; Moscow, Russia; WTA Premier; Hard, indoor 15–21 October 2018	–	2R	(Russia) Anastasia Pavlyuchenkova	40	Withdrew	N/A

== Tournament schedule ==
=== Singles schedule ===
Halep's 2018 singles tournament schedule is as follows:

Date	Championship	Location	Category	Surface	2017 result	2017 points	2018 points	Outcome
1 January – 7 January	Shenzhen Open	Shenzhen	International	Hard	2R	30	280	Winner defeated (Czech Republic) Kateřina Siniaková; 6–1, 2–6, 6–0
15 January – 28 January	Australian Open	Melbourne	Grand Slam	Hard	1R	10	1300	Final lost to (Denmark) Caroline Wozniacki; 6–7^{(2–7)}, 6–3, 4–6
12 February – 17 February	Qatar Open	Doha	Premier 5 (Note: Qatar Total Open was a Premier tournament in 2017.)	Hard	DNP	0	350	Semifinals withdrew to (Spain) Garbiñe Muguruza; N/A
5 March – 18 March	Indian Wells Open	Indian Wells	Premier Mandatory	Hard	3R	65	390	Semifinals lost to (Japan) Naomi Osaka; 3–6, 0–6
19 March – 1 April	Miami Open	Miami	Premier Mandatory	Hard	QF	215	65	Third round lost to (Poland) Agnieszka Radwańska; 6–3, 2–6, 3–6
23 April – 29 April	Stuttgart Open	Stuttgart	Premier	Clay (i)	SF	185	100	Quarterfinals lost to (United States) CoCo Vandeweghe; 4–6, 1–6
7 May – 13 May	Madrid Open	Madrid	Premier Mandatory	Clay	W	1000	215	Quarterfinals lost to (Czech Republic) Karolína Plíšková; 4–6, 3–6
14 May – 20 May	Italian Open	Rome	Premier 5	Clay	F	585	585	Final lost to (Ukraine) Elina Svitolina; 0–6, 4–6
27 May – 10 June	French Open	Paris	Grand Slam	Clay	F	1300	2000	Winner defeated (United States) Sloane Stephens; 3–6, 6–4, 6–1
2 July – 15 July	Wimbledon	London	Grand Slam	Grass	QF	430	130	Third round lost to (Chinese Taipei) Hsieh Su-wei; 6–3, 4–6, 5–7
6 August – 12 August	Canadian Open	Montréal	Premier 5	Hard	SF	350	900	Winner defeated (United States) Sloane Stephens; 7–6^{(8–6)}, 3–6, 6–4
13 August – 19 August	Cincinnati Open	Cincinnati	Premier 5	Hard	F	585	585	Final lost to (Netherlands) Kiki Bertens; 6–2, 6–7^{(6–8)}, 2–6
20 August – 25 August	Connecticut Open	New Haven	Premier	Hard	DNP	0	0	Withdrew due to injuries to achilles tendon
27 August – 9 September	US Open	New York City	Grand Slam	Hard	1R	10	10	First round lost to (Estonia) Kaia Kanepi; 2–6, 4–6
23 September – 29 September	Wuhan Open	Wuhan	Premier 5	Hard	2R	1	1	Second round lost to (Slovakia) Dominika Cibulková; 0–6, 5–7
1 October – 7 October	China Open	Beijing	Premier Mandatory	Hard	F	650	10	First round lost to (Tunisia) Ons Jabeur; 1–6, retired
15 October – 21 October	Kremlin Cup	Moscow	Premier	Hard	DNP	0	0	Withdrew due to injuries to back injury
Road to Singapore points as of 2018 China Open						5675	6921	▲1246 difference
Total year-end points						6175	6921	▲746 difference

== Yearly records ==
=== Head-to-head matchups ===
Surface	Win–loss	Win%
**Hard**	28–6	82.35%
**Clay**	16–3	84.21%
**Grass**	2–1	66.67%
Overall	46–10	82.14%

Players are ordered by letter. (Bold denotes a top 10 player at the time of the most recent match between the two players, Italic denotes top 50.)

- (Germany) Angelique Kerber 2–0
- (Belarus) Aryna Sabalenka 2–0
- (Australia) Ashleigh Barty 2–0
- (France) **Caroline Garcia** 2–0
- (Russia) Ekaterina Makarova 2–0
- (Belgium) Elise Mertens 2–0
- (Czech Republic) Kristýna Plíšková 2–0
- (United States) **Sloane Stephens** 2–0
- (Australia) Ajla Tomljanović 1–0
- (United States) Alison Riske 1–0
- (Russia) Anastasia Pavlyuchenkova 1–0
- (Latvia) Anastasija Sevastova 1–0
- (Germany) Andrea Petkovic 1–0
- (United States) Caroline Dolehide 1–0
- (United States) CiCi Bellis 1–0
- (Australia) Destanee Aiava 1–0
- (China) Duan Yingying 1–0
- (Canada) Eugenie Bouchard 1–0
- (Spain) **Garbiñe Muguruza** 1–0
- (Romania) Irina-Camelia Begu 1–0
- (Czech Republic) Kateřina Siniaková 1–0
- (Japan) Kurumi Nara 1–0
- (United States) Lauren Davis 1–0
- (Ukraine) Lesia Tsurenko 1–0
- (Slovakia) Magdaléna Rybáriková 1–0
- (Russia) Maria Sharapova 1–0
- (United States) Nicole Gibbs 1–0
- (France) Océane Dodin 1–0
- (Switzerland) Patty Schnyder 1–0
- (Croatia) Petra Martić 1–0
- (United States) Taylor Townsend 1–0
- (United States) Venus Williams 1–0
- (Switzerland) Viktorija Golubic 1–0
- (China) Wang Qiang 1–0
- (China) Saisai Zheng 1–0
- (Czech Republic) **Karolína Plíšková** 1–1
- (Japan) Naomi Osaka 1–1
- (Poland) Agnieszka Radwańska 0–1
- (Denmark) **Caroline Wozniacki** 0–1
- (United States) CoCo Vandeweghe 0–1
- (Slovakia) Dominika Cibulková 0–1
- (Ukraine) **Elina Svitolina** 0–1
- (Chinese Taipei) Hsieh Su-wei 0–1
- (Estonia) Kaia Kanepi 0–1
- (Netherlands) Kiki Bertens 0–1
- (Tunisia) Ons Jabeur 0–1

=== Top 10 wins ===
#	Player	Rank	Tournament	Surface	Round	Score	SHR
1.	(Czech Republic) Karolína Plíšková	6	Australian Open, Australia	Hard	Quarterfinals	6–3, 6–2	1
2.	(France) Caroline Garcia	7	Italian Open, Italy	Clay	Quarterfinals	6–2, 6–3	1
3.	(Spain) Garbiñe Muguruza	3	French Open, France	Clay	Semifinals	6–1, 6–4	1
4.	(United States) Sloane Stephens	10	French Open, France	Clay	Final	3–6, 6–4, 6–1	1
5.	(France) Caroline Garcia	6	Canadian Open, Canada	Hard	Quarterfinals	7–5, 6–1	1
6.	(United States) Sloane Stephens	3	Canadian Open, Canada	Hard	Final	7–6^{(8–6)}, 3–6, 6–4	1

=== Finals ===
Singles: 6 (3 titles, 3 runner-ups)

Legend Grand Slam tournaments (1–1) WTA Tour Championships (0–0) Premier Mandatory & Premier 5 (1–2) Premier (0–0) International (1–0)	Finals by surface Hard (2–2) Clay (1–1) Grass (0–0)	Titles by setting Outdoors (3–2) Indoors (0–0)

Result	W–L	Date	Tournament	Tier	Surface	Opponent	Score
Win	1–0	Jan 2018	Shenzhen Open, China	International	Hard	(Czech Republic) Katerina Siniaková	6–1, 2–6, 6–0
Loss	1–1	Jan 2018	Australian Open, Australia	Grand Slam	Hard	(Denmark) Caroline Wozniacki	6–7^{(2–7)}, 6–3, 4–6
Loss	1–2	May 2018	Italian Open, Italy	Premier 5	Clay	(Ukraine) Elina Svitolina	0–6, 4–6
Win	2–2	Jun 2018	French Open, France	Grand Slam	Clay	(United States) Sloane Stephens	3–6, 6–4, 6–1
Win	3–2	Aug 2018	Canadian Open, Canada	Premier 5	Hard	(United States) Sloane Stephens	7–6^{(8–6)}, 3–6, 6–4
Loss	3–3	Aug 2018	Cincinnati Open, USA	Premier 5	Hard	(Netherlands) Kiki Bertens	6–2, 6–7^{6}, 2–6

=== Earnings ===
The tournaments won by Halep are in boldface.

#	Tournament	Prize money	Year-to-date
1.	**Shenzhen Open**	US$163,260	$163,260
2.	Australian Open	A$2,000,000	$1,680,732
3.	Qatar Open	$147,750	$1,680,879
4.	Indian Wells Masters	$327,965	$2,008,844
5.	Miami Open	$47,170	$2,056,014
6.	Stuttgart Open	€16,411	$2,077,509
7.	Mutua Madrid Open	€149,390	$2,253,877
8.	Italian Open	€253,425	$2,568,124
9.	**French Open**	€2,200,000	$5,345,777
10.	Wimbledon Championships	£100,000	$5,483,511
11.	**Rogers Cup**	$521,825	$6,005,336
12.	Cincinnati Open	$243,920	$6,249,256
–	Connecticut Open	—N/a	$6,249,256
13.	US Open	$	$
**Total prize money**			**$6,249,256**

== See also ==
- 2018 WTA Tour
- 2018 Angelique Kerber tennis season
- 2018 Caroline Wozniacki tennis season
- Simona Halep career statistics
- List of WTA number 1 ranked tennis players
