= 2018 Angelique Kerber tennis season =

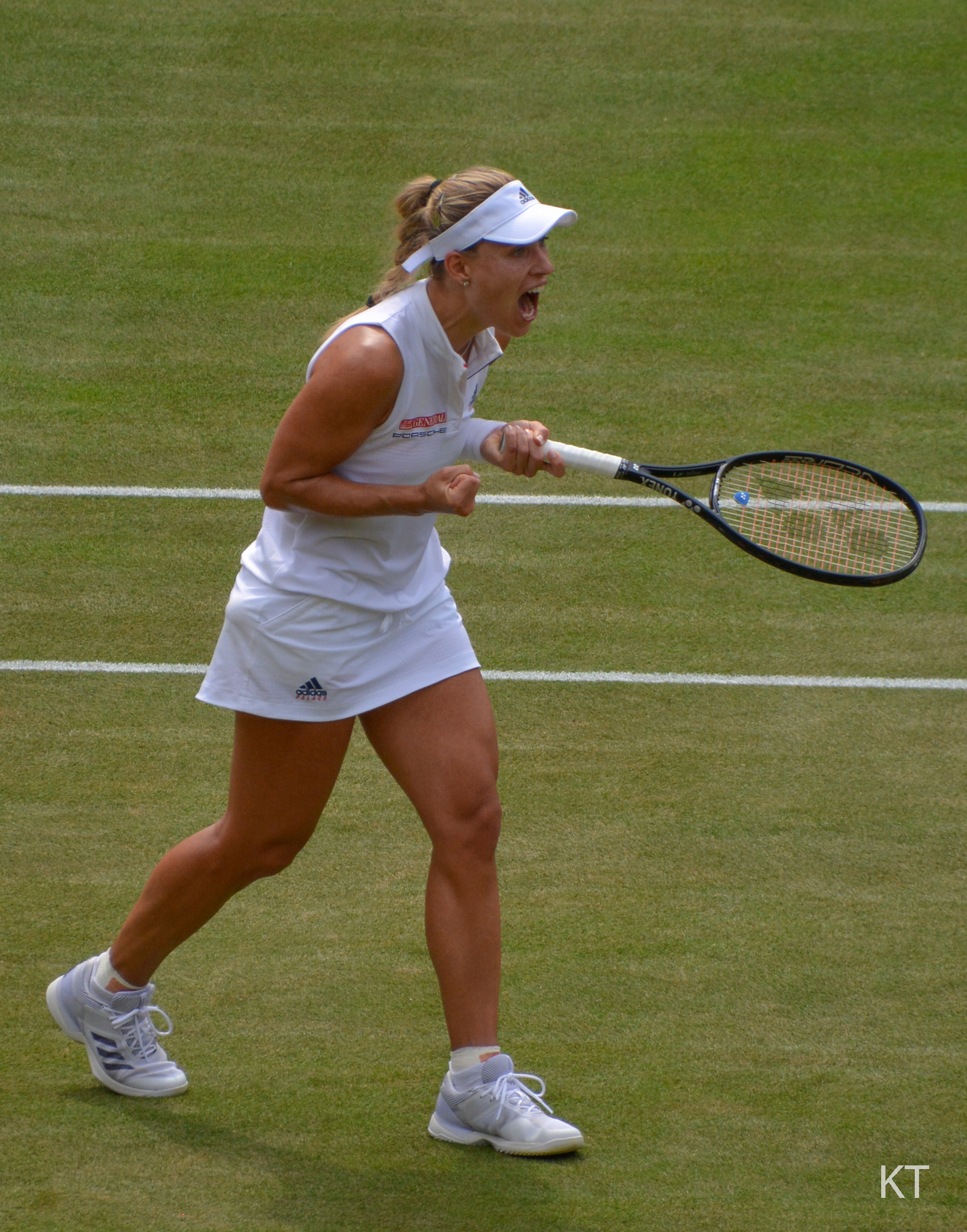
- Angelique Kerber at 2018 Wimbledon Championships
- Full name: Angelique Kerber
- Country: Germany
- Calendar prize money: $5,686,362

Singles
- Season record: 46–19
- Calendar titles: 2
- Year-end ranking: No. 2
- Ranking change from previous year: ▲19

Grand Slam & significant results
- Australian Open: SF
- French Open: QF
- Wimbledon: W
- US Open: 3R
- Other tournaments
- Championships: RR

Fed Cup
- Fed Cup: SF
- Last updated on: 26 October 2018.

The 2018 Angelique Kerber tennis season officially began on 30 December 2017 with the start of the 2018 Hopman Cup. Angelique Kerber entered the season as the No. 21 ranked player in the world.

== Year in detail ==
=== Early hard court season and Australian Open ===
==== Hopman Cup ====
Kerber began her season at the Hopman Cup paired with Alexander Zverev. At the group stage she defeated Elise Mertens, Genie Bouchard and Daria Gavrilova all in straight sets, helping Germany to reach the final at this tournament. At the final stage she defeated Belinda Bencic, but they lost at the doubles match in straight sets.

==== Sydney Open ====
Next tournament was the Sydney Open. She defeated Lucie Šafářová, despite being two match points in the second set, the no. 2 seed Venus Williams, Dominika Cibulková, qualifier Camila Giorgi and Daria Gavrilova. In the final match she faced Ashleigh Barty and went to win the title, defeating her 6–4, 6–4, claiming her first title since 2016 US Open.

==== Australian Open ====
Her next tournament was the Australian Open. She was 21st seed. She defeated Anna-Lena Friedsam in straight sets. She then beat Donna Vekic, the former Australian Open champion and the world no.1 Maria Sharapova in straight sets. She went on to defeat Hsieh Su-Wei in the 4th round in three sets and former world No. 7 Madison Keys in the quarter-finals, in straight sets. She faced the world No. 1 Simona Halep in the semi-finals. In the 3rd set she saved 3 match points. However, she felt down at the 9–7. After Australian Open, she returned to top ten.

==== Qatar Total Open ====
Kerber then played the Qatar Open, where she received a bye in the opening round. At the second and third round she defeated Samantha Stosur and Johanna Konta respectively. In quarterfinals, she faced the no. 1 seed Caroline Wozniacki, whom she lost in three sets.

== All matches ==
Key
W	F	SF	QF	#R	RR	Q#	P#	DNQ	A	Z#	PO	G	S	B	NMS	NTI	P	NH

(W) winner; (F) finalist; (SF) semifinalist; (QF) quarterfinalist; (#R) rounds 4, 3, 2, 1; (RR) round-robin stage; (Q#) qualification round; (P#) preliminary round; (DNQ) did not qualify; (A) absent; (Z#) Davis/Fed Cup Zonal Group (with number indication) or (PO) play-off; (G) gold, (S) silver or (B) bronze Olympic/Paralympic medal; (NMS) not a Masters tournament; (NTI) not a Tier I tournament; (P) postponed; (NH) not held; (SR) strike rate (events won / competed); (W–L) win–loss record.
To avoid confusion and double counting, these charts are updated at the conclusion of a tournament or when the player's participation has ended.

=== Singles matches ===
Tournament	Match	Round	Opponent	Rank	Result	Score
Sydney International; Sydney, Australia; WTA Premier; Hard, outdoor 7 – 13 January 2018
Sydney International; Sydney, Australia; WTA Premier; Hard, outdoor 7 – 13 January 2018	1	1R	(Czech Republic) Lucie Šafářová	31	Win	6–7^{(7–3)}, 7–6^{(8–6)}, 6–2
Sydney International; Sydney, Australia; WTA Premier; Hard, outdoor 7 – 13 January 2018	2	2R	(United States) Venus Williams (2)	5	Win	5–7, 6–3, 6–1
Sydney International; Sydney, Australia; WTA Premier; Hard, outdoor 7 – 13 January 2018	3	QF	(Slovakia) Dominika Cibulková	26	Win	6–3, 6–1
Sydney International; Sydney, Australia; WTA Premier; Hard, outdoor 7 – 13 January 2018	4	SF	(Italy) Camila Giorgi (Q)	100	Win	6–3, 6–2
Sydney International; Sydney, Australia; WTA Premier; Hard, outdoor 7 – 13 January 2018	5	W	(Australia) Ashleigh Barty	19	Win (1)	6–4, 6–4
Australian Open; Melbourne, Australia; Grand Slam; Hard, outdoor 15 – 28 January 2018
Australian Open; Melbourne, Australia; Grand Slam; Hard, outdoor 15 – 28 January 2018	6	1R	(Germany) Anna-Lena Friedsam (PR)	388	Win	6–4, 6–0
Australian Open; Melbourne, Australia; Grand Slam; Hard, outdoor 15 – 28 January 2018	7	2R	(Croatia) Donna Vekić	52	Win	6–4, 6–1
Australian Open; Melbourne, Australia; Grand Slam; Hard, outdoor 15 – 28 January 2018	8	3R	(Russia) Maria Sharapova	48	Win	6–1, 6–3
Australian Open; Melbourne, Australia; Grand Slam; Hard, outdoor 15 – 28 January 2018	9	4R	(Chinese Taipei) Hsieh Su-wei	88	Win	4–6, 7–5, 6–2
Australian Open; Melbourne, Australia; Grand Slam; Hard, outdoor 15 – 28 January 2018	10	QF	(United States) Madison Keys (17)	20	Win	6–1, 6–2
Australian Open; Melbourne, Australia; Grand Slam; Hard, outdoor 15 – 28 January 2018	11	SF	(Romania) Simona Halep (1)	1	Loss	3–6, 6–4, 7–9
Qatar Open; Doha, Qatar; WTA Premier 5 Hard, outdoor 12 – 17 February 2018
Qatar Open; Doha, Qatar; WTA Premier 5 Hard, outdoor 12 – 17 February 2018	–	1R	Bye			
Qatar Open; Doha, Qatar; WTA Premier 5 Hard, outdoor 12 – 17 February 2018	12	2R	(Australia) Samantha Stosur	44	Win	6–4, 6–1
Qatar Open; Doha, Qatar; WTA Premier 5 Hard, outdoor 12 – 17 February 2018	13	3R	(United Kingdom) Johanna Konta (10)	11	Win	1–6, 6–1, 6–3
Qatar Open; Doha, Qatar; WTA Premier 5 Hard, outdoor 12 – 17 February 2018	14	QF	(Denmark) Caroline Wozniacki (1)	1	Loss	6–7^{(4–7)}, 6–1, 3–6
Dubai Tennis Championships; Dubai, United Arab Emirates; WTA Premier; Hard, outdoor 19 – 25 February 2018
Dubai Tennis Championships; Dubai, United Arab Emirates; WTA Premier; Hard, outdoor 19 – 25 February 2018	15	1R	(Czech Republic) Barbora Strýcová	25	Win	6–2, 6–1
Dubai Tennis Championships; Dubai, United Arab Emirates; WTA Premier; Hard, outdoor 19 – 25 February 2018	16	2R	(Italy) Sara Errani (Q)	143	Win	6–4, 6–2
Dubai Tennis Championships; Dubai, United Arab Emirates; WTA Premier; Hard, outdoor 19 – 25 February 2018	17	QF	(Czech Republic) Karolína Plíšková (3)	5	Win	6–4, 6–3
Dubai Tennis Championships; Dubai, United Arab Emirates; WTA Premier; Hard, outdoor 19 – 25 February 2018	18	SF	(Ukraine) Elina Svitolina (1)	4	Loss	3–6, 3–6
Indian Wells Open; Indian Wells, United States; WTA Premier Mandatory; Hard, outdoor 5 – 18 March 2018
Indian Wells Open; Indian Wells, United States; WTA Premier Mandatory; Hard, outdoor 5 – 18 March 2018	–	1R	Bye			
Indian Wells Open; Indian Wells, United States; WTA Premier Mandatory; Hard, outdoor 5 – 18 March 2018	19	2R	(Russia) Ekaterina Makarova	37	Win	3–6, 6–4, 6–2
Indian Wells Open; Indian Wells, United States; WTA Premier Mandatory; Hard, outdoor 5 – 18 March 2018	20	3R	(Russia) Elena Vesnina (24)	24	Win	7–5, 6–2
Indian Wells Open; Indian Wells, United States; WTA Premier Mandatory; Hard, outdoor 5 – 18 March 2018	21	4R	(France) Caroline Garcia (7)	7	Win	6–1, 6–1
Indian Wells Open; Indian Wells, United States; WTA Premier Mandatory; Hard, outdoor 5 – 18 March 2018	22	QF	(Russia) Daria Kasatkina (20)	19	Loss	0–6, 2–6
Miami Open; Miami, United States; WTA Premier Mandatory; Hard, outdoor 19 March – 1 April 2018
Miami Open; Miami, United States; WTA Premier Mandatory; Hard, outdoor 19 March – 1 April 2018	–	1R	Bye			
Miami Open; Miami, United States; WTA Premier Mandatory; Hard, outdoor 19 March – 1 April 2018	23	2R	(Sweden) Johanna Larsson	76	Win	6–2, 6–2
Miami Open; Miami, United States; WTA Premier Mandatory; Hard, outdoor 19 March – 1 April 2018	24	3R	(Russia) Anastasia Pavlyuchenkova (23)	25	Win	6–4, 6–4
Miami Open; Miami, United States; WTA Premier Mandatory; Hard, outdoor 19 March – 1 April 2018	25	4R	(China) Wang Yafan (Q)	125	Win	6–7^{(1–7)}, 7–6^{(7–5)}, 6–3
Miami Open; Miami, United States; WTA Premier Mandatory; Hard, outdoor 19 March – 1 April 2018	26	QF	(United States) Sloane Stephens (13)	12	Loss	1–6, 2–6
Fed Cup World Group; Germany vs. Czech Republic; Stuttgart, Germany; Fed Cup; Clay, indoor 21 – 22 April 2018
Fed Cup World Group; Germany vs. Czech Republic; Stuttgart, Germany; Fed Cup; Clay, indoor 21 – 22 April 2018	27	SF	(Czech Republic) Petra Kvitová	10	Loss	2–6, 2–6
Fed Cup World Group; Germany vs. Czech Republic; Stuttgart, Germany; Fed Cup; Clay, indoor 21 – 22 April 2018	28	SF	(Czech Republic) Karolína Plíšková	6	Loss	5–7, 3–6
Stuttgart Open; Stuttgart, Germany; WTA Premier; Clay, indoor 23 – 29 April 2018
Stuttgart Open; Stuttgart, Germany; WTA Premier; Clay, indoor 23 – 29 April 2018	29	1R	(Czech Republic) Petra Kvitová (8)	10	Win	6–3, 6–2
Stuttgart Open; Stuttgart, Germany; WTA Premier; Clay, indoor 23 – 29 April 2018	30	2R	(Estonia) Anett Kontaveit	31	Loss	0–6, 0–2 retired
Italian Open; Rome, Italy; WTA Premier 5 Clay, outdoor 14 – 20 May 2018
Italian Open; Rome, Italy; WTA Premier 5 Clay, outdoor 14 – 20 May 2018	31	1R	(Kazakhstan) Zarina Diyas (LL)	54	Win	6–2, 7–6^{(8–6)}
Italian Open; Rome, Italy; WTA Premier 5 Clay, outdoor 14 – 20 May 2018	32	2R	(Romania) Irina-Camelia Begu	41	Win	3–6, 7–5, 7–5
Italian Open; Rome, Italy; WTA Premier 5 Clay, outdoor 14 – 20 May 2018	33	3R	(Greece) Maria Sakkari	42	Win	6–1, 6–1
Italian Open; Rome, Italy; WTA Premier 5 Clay, outdoor 14 – 20 May 2018	34	QF	(Ukraine) Elina Svitolina (4)	4	Loss	4–6, 4–6
French Open; Paris, France; Grand Slam; Clay, outdoor 27 May –10 June 2018
French Open; Paris, France; Grand Slam; Clay, outdoor 27 May –10 June 2018	35	1R	(Germany) Mona Barthel	117	Win	6–2, 6–3
French Open; Paris, France; Grand Slam; Clay, outdoor 27 May –10 June 2018	36	2R	(Romania) Ana Bogdan	66	Win	6–2, 6–3
French Open; Paris, France; Grand Slam; Clay, outdoor 27 May –10 June 2018	37	3R	(Netherlands) Kiki Bertens (18)	22	Win	7–6^{(7–4)}, 7–6^{(7–4)}
French Open; Paris, France; Grand Slam; Clay, outdoor 27 May –10 June 2018	38	4R	(France) Caroline Garcia (7)	7	Win	6–2, 6–3
French Open; Paris, France; Grand Slam; Clay, outdoor 27 May –10 June 2018	39	QF	(Romania) Simona Halep (1)	1	Loss	7–6^{(7–2)}, 3–6, 2–6
Mallorca Open; Majorca, Spain; WTA International; Grass, outdoor 18 – 24 June 2018
Mallorca Open; Majorca, Spain; WTA International; Grass, outdoor 18 – 24 June 2018	40	1R	(United States) Alison Riske (Q)	61	Loss	7–5, 2–6, 1–6
Eastbourne International; Eastbourne, United Kingdom; WTA Premier; Grass, indoor 24 – 30 June 2018
Eastbourne International; Eastbourne, United Kingdom; WTA Premier; Grass, indoor 24 – 30 June 2018	–	1R	Bye			
Eastbourne International; Eastbourne, United Kingdom; WTA Premier; Grass, indoor 24 – 30 June 2018	41	2R	(Slovakia) Dominika Cibulková	56	Win	6–3, 6–3
Eastbourne International; Eastbourne, United Kingdom; WTA Premier; Grass, indoor 24 – 30 June 2018	42	3R	(United States) Danielle Collins	43	Win	6–1, 6–1
Eastbourne International; Eastbourne, United Kingdom; WTA Premier; Grass, indoor 24 – 30 June 2018	43	QF	(Russia) Daria Kasatkina (7)	14	Win	6–1, 6–7^{(3–7)}, 7–6^{(7–3)}
Eastbourne International; Eastbourne, United Kingdom; WTA Premier; Grass, indoor 24 – 30 June 2018	44	SF	(Denmark) Caroline Wozniacki (1)	2	Loss	6–2, 6–7^{(4–7)}, 4–6
Wimbledon Championships; London, United Kingdom; Grand Slam; Grass, outdoor 2 –15 July 2018
Wimbledon Championships; London, United Kingdom; Grand Slam; Grass, outdoor 2 –15 July 2018	45	1R	(Russia) Vera Zvonareva (Q)	142	Win	7–5, 6–3
Wimbledon Championships; London, United Kingdom; Grand Slam; Grass, outdoor 2 –15 July 2018	46	2R	(United States) Claire Liu (Q)	237	Win	3–6, 6–2, 6–4
Wimbledon Championships; London, United Kingdom; Grand Slam; Grass, outdoor 2 –15 July 2018	47	3R	(Japan) Naomi Osaka (18)	18	Win	6–2, 6–4
Wimbledon Championships; London, United Kingdom; Grand Slam; Grass, outdoor 2 –15 July 2018	48	4R	(Switzerland) Belinda Bencic	56	Win	6–3, 7–6^{(7–5)}
Wimbledon Championships; London, United Kingdom; Grand Slam; Grass, outdoor 2 –15 July 2018	49	QF	(Russia) Daria Kasatkina (14)	14	Win	6–3, 7–5
Wimbledon Championships; London, United Kingdom; Grand Slam; Grass, outdoor 2 –15 July 2018	50	SF	(Latvia) Jeļena Ostapenko (12)	12	Win	6–3, 6–3
Wimbledon Championships; London, United Kingdom; Grand Slam; Grass, outdoor 2 –15 July 2018	51	W	(United States) Serena Williams (25/PR)	181	Win (2)	6–3, 6–3
Canadian Open; Montreal, Canada; WTA Premier 5 Hard, outdoor 6 – 12 August 2018
Canadian Open; Montreal, Canada; WTA Premier 5 Hard, outdoor 6 – 12 August 2018	–	1R	Bye			
Canadian Open; Montreal, Canada; WTA Premier 5 Hard, outdoor 6 – 12 August 2018	52	2R	(France) Alizé Cornet	34	Loss	4–6, 1–6
Cincinnati Open; Cincinnati, United States; WTA Premier 5 Hard, outdoor 13 – 19 August 2018
Cincinnati Open; Cincinnati, United States; WTA Premier 5 Hard, outdoor 13 – 19 August 2018	–	1R	Bye			
Cincinnati Open; Cincinnati, United States; WTA Premier 5 Hard, outdoor 13 – 19 August 2018	53	2R	(Russia) Anastasia Pavlyuchenkova	28	Win	4–6, 7–5, 6–4
Cincinnati Open; Cincinnati, United States; WTA Premier 5 Hard, outdoor 13 – 19 August 2018	54	3R	(United States) Madison Keys (13)	13	Loss	6–2, 6–7^{(3–7)}, 4–6
U.S. Open; New York City, United States; Grand Slam; Hard, outdoor 27 August – 9 September 2018
U.S. Open; New York City, United States; Grand Slam; Hard, outdoor 27 August – 9 September 2018	55	1R	(Russia) Margarita Gasparyan (PR)	370	Win	7–6^{(7–5)}, 6–3
U.S. Open; New York City, United States; Grand Slam; Hard, outdoor 27 August – 9 September 2018	56	2R	(Sweden) Johanna Larsson	82	Win	6–2, 5–7, 6–4
U.S. Open; New York City, United States; Grand Slam; Hard, outdoor 27 August – 9 September 2018	57	3R	(Slovakia) Dominika Cibulková (29)	35	Loss	6–3, 3–6, 3–6
Wuhan Open; Wuhan, China; Premier 5 Hard, outdoor 23 – 29 September 2018
Wuhan Open; Wuhan, China; Premier 5 Hard, outdoor 23 – 29 September 2018	–	1R	Bye			
Wuhan Open; Wuhan, China; Premier 5 Hard, outdoor 23 – 29 September 2018	58	2R	(United States) Madison Keys	18	Win	6–0, 4–1 ret.
Wuhan Open; Wuhan, China; Premier 5 Hard, outdoor 23 – 29 September 2018	59	3R	(Australia) Ashleigh Barty (16)	17	Loss	5–7, 1–6
China Open; Beijing, China; Premier Mandatory; Hard, outdoor 1 – 7 October 2018
China Open; Beijing, China; Premier Mandatory; Hard, outdoor 1 – 7 October 2018	60	1R	(France) Kristina Mladenovic	48	Win	6–2, 6–2
China Open; Beijing, China; Premier Mandatory; Hard, outdoor 1 – 7 October 2018	61	2R	(Spain) Carla Suárez Navarro	23	Win	7–6^{(7–4)}, 6–1
China Open; Beijing, China; Premier Mandatory; Hard, outdoor 1 – 7 October 2018	62	3R	(China) Zhang Shuai	45	Loss	1–6, 6–2, 0–6
WTA Finals; Singapore; WTA Finals; Hard, indoor 21 – 28 October 2018
WTA Finals; Singapore; WTA Finals; Hard, indoor 21 – 28 October 2018	63	RR	(Netherlands) Kiki Bertens (8)	9	Loss	6–1, 3–6, 4–6
WTA Finals; Singapore; WTA Finals; Hard, indoor 21 – 28 October 2018	64	RR	(Japan) Naomi Osaka (3)	4	Win	6–4, 5–7, 6–4
WTA Finals; Singapore; WTA Finals; Hard, indoor 21 – 28 October 2018	65	RR	(United States) Sloane Stephens (5)	6	Loss	3–6, 3–6

=== Hopman Cup ===
==== Singles ====
Tournament	Match	Round	Opponent	Rank	Result	Score
Hopman Cup; Perth, Australia; Hopman Cup; Hard, indoor 30 December 2017 – 6 January 2018
Hopman Cup; Perth, Australia; Hopman Cup; Hard, indoor 30 December 2017 – 6 January 2018	1	RR	(Belgium) Elise Mertens	38	Win	7–6^{(8–6)}, 7–6^{(7–1)}
Hopman Cup; Perth, Australia; Hopman Cup; Hard, indoor 30 December 2017 – 6 January 2018	2	RR	(Canada) Eugenie Bouchard	79	Win	6–3, 6–1
Hopman Cup; Perth, Australia; Hopman Cup; Hard, indoor 30 December 2017 – 6 January 2018	3	RR	(Australia) Daria Gavrilova	22	Win	6–1, 6–2
Hopman Cup; Perth, Australia; Hopman Cup; Hard, indoor 30 December 2017 – 6 January 2018	4	F	(Switzerland) Belinda Bencic	196	Win	6–4, 6–1

==== Mixed doubles ====
Tournament	Match	Round	Opponent	Rank	Result	Score
Hopman Cup; Perth, Australia; Hopman Cup; Hard, indoor 30 December 2017 – 6 January 2018; Partner: (Germany) Alexander Zverev
Hopman Cup; Perth, Australia; Hopman Cup; Hard, indoor 30 December 2017 – 6 January 2018; Partner: (Germany) Alexander Zverev	1	RR	(Belgium) Elise Mertens / (Belgium) David Goffin	– / –	Win	4–2, 4–3^{(5–2)}
Hopman Cup; Perth, Australia; Hopman Cup; Hard, indoor 30 December 2017 – 6 January 2018; Partner: (Germany) Alexander Zverev	2	RR	(Canada) Eugenie Bouchard / (Canada) Vasek Pospisil	– / –	Win	4–3^{(5–2)}, 4–3^{(5–2)}
Hopman Cup; Perth, Australia; Hopman Cup; Hard, indoor 30 December 2017 – 6 January 2018; Partner: (Germany) Alexander Zverev	3	RR	(Australia) Daria Gavrilova / (Australia) Thanasi Kokkinakis	– / –	Win	1–4, 4–1, 4–3^{(5–3)}
Hopman Cup; Perth, Australia; Hopman Cup; Hard, indoor 30 December 2017 – 6 January 2018; Partner: (Germany) Alexander Zverev	4	F	(Switzerland) Belinda Bencic / (Switzerland) Roger Federer	– / –	Loss	3–4^{(3–5)}, 2–4

== Tournament schedule ==
=== Singles schedule ===
Kerber's 2018 singles tournament schedule is as follows:

Date	Championship	Location	Category	Surface	2017 result	2017 points	2018 points	Outcome
7 January – 13 January	Sydney International	Sydney	Premier	Hard	2R	1	470	Winner defeated (Australia) Ashleigh Barty; 6–4, 6–4
15 January – 28 January	Australian Open	Melbourne	Grand Slam	Hard	4R	240	780	Semifinals lost to (Romania) Simona Halep; 3–6, 6–4, 7–9
12 February – 17 February	Qatar Open	Doha	Premier 5 (Note: Qatar Total Open was a Premier tournament in 2017.)	Hard	2R	1	190	Quarterfinals lost to (Denmark) Caroline Wozniacki; 6–7^{(4–7)}, 6–1, 3–6
19 February – 25 February	Dubai Tennis Championships	Doha	Premier (Note: Dubai Tennis Championships was a Premier 5 tournament in 2017.)	Hard	SF	350	185	Semifinals lost to (Ukraine) Elina Svitolina; 3–6, 3–6
5 March – 18 March	Indian Wells Open	Indian Wells	Premier Mandatory	Hard	4R	120	215	Quarterfinals lost to (Russia) Daria Kasatkina; 0–6, 2–6
19 March – 1 April	Miami Open	Miami	Premier Mandatory	Hard	QF	215	215	Quarterfinals lost to (United States) Sloane Stephens; 1–6, 2–6
23 April – 29 April	Stuttgart Open	Stuttgart	Premier	Clay (i)	2R	1	55	Second round lost to (Estonia) Anett Kontaveit; 0–6, 0–2 retired
14 May – 20 May	Italian Open	Rome	Premier 5	Clay	2R	1	190	Quarterfinals lost to (Ukraine) Elina Svitolina; 4–6, 4–6
27 May – 10 June	French Open	Paris	Grand Slam	Clay	1R	10	430	Quarterfinals lost to (Romania) Simona Halep; 7–6^{(7–2)}, 3–6, 2–6
18 June – 24 June	Mallorca Open	Majorca	International	Hard	DNP	0	1	First round lost to (United States) Alison Riske; 4–6, 6–7^{(2–7)}
24 June – 30 June	Eastbourne International	United Kingdom	Premier	Grass	QF	100	185	Semifinals lost to (Denmark) Caroline Wozniacki; 6–2, 6–7^{(4–7)}, 4–6
2 July – 15 July	Wimbledon	London	Grand Slam	Grass	4R	240	2000	Winner defeated (United States) Serena Williams; 6–3, 6–3
6 August – 12 August	Canadian Open	Montréal	Premier 5	Hard	3R	105	1	Second round lost to (France) Alizé Cornet; 4–6, 1–6
13 August – 19 August	Cincinnati Open	Cincinnati	Premier 5	Hard	2R	1	105	Third round lost to (United States) Madison Keys; 6–2, 6–7^{(3–7)}, 4–6
27 August – 9 September	US Open	New York	Grand Slam	Hard	1R	10	130	Third round lost to (Slovakia) Dominika Cibulková; 6–3, 3–6, 3–6
23 September – 29 September	Wuhan Open	Wuhan	Premier 5	Hard	1R	1	105	Third round lost to (Australia) Ashleigh Barty; 5–7, 1–6
1 October – 7 October	China Open	Beijing	Premier Mandatory	Hard	2R	65	120	Third round lost to (China) Zhang Shuai; 1–6, 6–2, 0–6
21 October – 28 October	WTA Finals	Singapore	WTA Finals	Hard	DNP	0	500	Failed to advance into the semifinals Round robin: 1 win & 2 losses
Total year-end points						2121	5875	▲3754 difference

== Yearly records ==
=== Top 10 wins ===
#	Player	Rank	Event	Surface	Round	Score	AKR
1.	(United States) Venus Williams	5	Sydney, Australia	Hard	2nd Round	5–7, 6–3, 6–1	22
2.	(Czech Republic) Karolína Plíšková	5	Dubai, United Arab Emirates	Hard	Quarterfinals	6–4, 6–3	9
3.	(France) Caroline Garcia	7	Indian Wells, United States	Hard	4th Round	6–1, 6–1	10
4.	(Czech Republic) Petra Kvitova	10	Stuttgart, Germany	Clay (i)	1st Round	6–3, 6–2	12
5.	(France) Caroline Garcia	7	French Open, Paris, France	Clay	4th Round	6–2, 6–3	12
6.	(Japan) Naomi Osaka	4	WTA Finals, Singapore	Hard (i)	Round Robin	6–4, 5–7, 6–4	2

=== Finals ===
==== Singles: 2 (2 titles) ====
Legend Grand Slam tournaments (1–0) WTA Tour Championships (0–0) Premier Mandatory & Premier 5 (0–0) Premier (1–0) International (0–0)	Finals by surface Hard (1–0) Clay (0–0) Grass (1–0)	Titles by setting Outdoors (2–0) Indoors (0–0)

Result	W–L	Date	Tournament	Tier	Surface	Opponent	Score
Win	1–0	Jan 2018	Sydney International, Australia	Premier	Hard	(Australia) Ashleigh Barty	6–4, 6–4
Win	2–0	Jul 2018	Wimbledon, United Kingdom	Grand Slam	Grass	(United States) Serena Williams	6–3, 6–3

==== Team competitions: 1 (1 runner-up) ====
Result	Date	Tournament	Surface	Partner(s)	Opponent team	Opponent players	Score
Loss	Jan 2018	Hopman Cup, Perth, Australia	Hard (i)	Alexander Zverev	Switzerland	Roger Federer; Belinda Bencic	1–2

== See also ==
- 2018 WTA Tour
- 2018 Caroline Wozniacki tennis season
- 2018 Simona Halep tennis season
- Angelique Kerber career statistics
