= 2018 İstanbul Cup – Doubles =

Doubles
- 2018 İstanbul Cup

Final
- Champions: (China) Liang Chen (China) Zhang Shuai
- Runners-up: (Switzerland) Xenia Knoll (United Kingdom) Anna Smith
- Score: 6–4, 6–4

Details
- Draw: 16
- Seeds: 4

Events
Singles	Doubles
← 2017 ·	İstanbul Cup	· 2019 →

Dalila Jakupović and Nadiia Kichenok were the defending champions, but Kichenok chose to compete in Stuttgart instead. Jakupović played alongside Irina Khromacheva, but lost in the first round to Natela Dzalamidze and Anna Kalinskaya.

Liang Chen and Zhang Shuai won the title, defeating Xenia Knoll and Anna Smith in the final, 6–4, 6–4.

== Seeds ==
1. (Ukraine) Kateryna Bondarenko / (Serbia) Aleksandra Krunić (quarterfinals, withdrew)
2. (Netherlands) Bibiane Schoofs / (Czech Republic) Renata Voráčová (first round)
3. (Switzerland) Xenia Knoll / (United Kingdom) Anna Smith (final)
4. (Slovenia) Dalila Jakupović / (Russia) Irina Khromacheva (first round)

== Draw ==
Key

- Q = Qualifier
- WC = Wild card
- LL = Lucky loser
- Alt = Alternate
- ITF = ITF entry
- PR = Protected ranking
- SR = Special ranking
- SE = Special exempt
- JE = Junior exempt
- JR = Junior Accelerator Programme entrant
- CO = College Accelerator Programme entrant
- NG = Next Gen Accelerator Program entrant
- w/o = Walkover
- r = Retired
- d = Defaulted

=== Draw ===
First round
1	(Ukraine) K Bondarenko (Serbia) A Krunić	6	6
(United States) D Krawczyk (Mexico) G Olmos	3	3
(Croatia) D Jurak (Australia) J Moore	3	7^{9}	[5]
(Argentina) M Irigoyen (Australia) E Perez	6	6^{7}	[10]
3	(Switzerland) X Knoll (United Kingdom) A Smith	6	4	[10]
(Romania) R Olaru (Russia) Y Sizikova	2	6	[7]
(Belarus) A Sabalenka (Greece) M Sakkari	6	6^{3}	[10]
(Germany) N Geuer (Australia) P Hon	3	7^{7}	[12]
(Georgia (country)) O Kalashnikova (Kazakhstan) G Voskoboeva	6	4	[11]
WC	(Turkey) İ Öz (Turkey) M Sezer	3	6	[9]
(Russia) N Dzalamidze (Russia) A Kalinskaya	3	6	[10]
4	(Slovenia) D Jakupović (Russia) I Khromacheva	6	3	[7]
(Hungary) RL Jani (Bulgaria) E Kostova	3	6^{2}
(China) C Liang (China) S Zhang	6	7^{7}
WC	(Turkey) A Aksu (United Kingdom) H Dart	6	1	[10]
2	(Netherlands) B Schoofs (Czech Republic) R Voráčová	2	6	[7]

Quarterfinals
1	(Ukraine) K Bondarenko (Serbia) A Krunić
(Argentina) M Irigoyen (Australia) E Perez	w/o
3	(Switzerland) X Knoll (United Kingdom) A Smith	6	6
(Germany) N Geuer (Australia) P Hon	2	2
(Georgia (country)) O Kalashnikova (Kazakhstan) G Voskoboeva	4	3
(Russia) N Dzalamidze (Russia) A Kalinskaya	6	6
(China) C Liang (China) S Zhang	6	6
WC	(Turkey) A Aksu (United Kingdom) H Dart	2	2

Semifinals
(Argentina) M Irigoyen (Australia) E Perez	5	3
3	(Switzerland) X Knoll (United Kingdom) A Smith	7	6
(Russia) N Dzalamidze (Russia) A Kalinskaya	3	1
(China) C Liang (China) S Zhang	6	6

Final
3	(Switzerland) X Knoll (United Kingdom) A Smith	4	4
(China) C Liang (China) S Zhang	6	6
