= List of career achievements by Caroline Wozniacki =

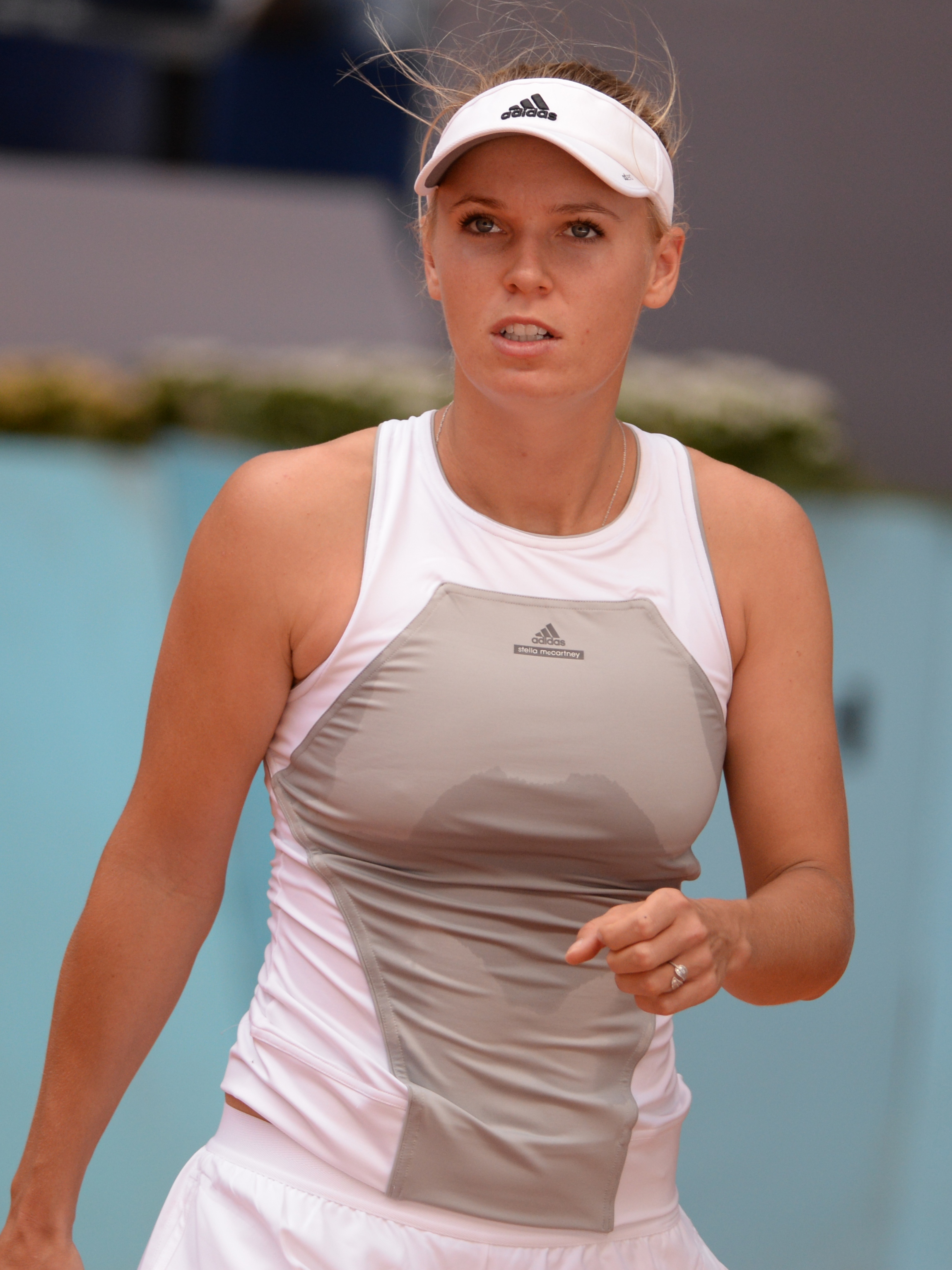
Caroline Wozniacki playing at the 2015 Madrid Open.

This is a list of career achievements by Danish tennis player Caroline Wozniacki. To date, she has won 30 singles titles including a Grand Slam title, a WTA Finals title, three WTA Premier Mandatory titles and three WTA Premier 5 titles. She was the winner of the 2018 Australian Open and the 2017 WTA Finals, and the runner-up at the 2009 US Open, the 2010 WTA Tour Championships, and the 2014 US Open. Wozniacki was first ranked world No. 1 by the WTA on October 11, 2010.

== Records ==
=== Grand Slam ===
- By winning the 2018 Australian Open, she became the first Danish player, man or woman, to win a Grand Slam singles title.
- At the 2018 Australian Open, she saved two match points against Jana Fett in the second round before she snatched the title, making her the ninth woman to win the title after being match point down.

=== Ranking ===
- By winning the 2010 China Open, she became the fifth player to reach the No. 1 position without having won a Grand Slam tournament. She also became the first Danish player, man or woman, to reach the top ranking.
- By winning the 2018 Australian Open, she regained the world No. 1 ranking on 29 January 2018. Wozniacki was last ranked No. 1 on 29 January 2012, exactly 6 years ago, and her new ascension beat Serena Williams' previous record of 5 years 29 days.

=== Prize money and earnings ===
- Wozniacki is the 10th highest female player in prize money of all time.
- Wozniacki was the 4th woman to win US$30,000,000 in career prize money on 19 February 2018.

=== Other ===
- Wozniacki won at least one title in 11 consecutive years from 2008 to 2018. As of 2021 this is the fifth highest overall in the Open Era, shared with Virginia Wade, Evonne Goolagong and Serena Williams.

== Recognition ==
- In celebration of the 50th anniversary of the Open Era in tennis (1968–2018), Tennis Magazine published a series "The 50 Greatest Players of the Open Era", rating the best 25 men and 25 women. They ranked Wozniacki as the 24th-best female player two days after she won the 2018 Australian Open.

== Awards ==
Year	Awards	Ref
2008	WTA Tour Most Impressive Newcomer of the Year	
2010	ITF Player of the Year	
2010	Danish Sports Name of the Year	
2011	Diamond Aces	
2014	US Open Sportsmanship Award	
2015	Diamond Aces	
2018	Danish Sports Name of the Year	

== Outside tennis ==
=== Marathon ===
On 2 November 2014, Wozniacki made her marathon debut, completing the New York City Marathon in a time of 3:26:33. This time was good enough to qualify for the 2016 Boston Marathon but Wozniacki said she will not run another marathon for a few years.

=== Modeling ===
Wozniacki appeared in the 2015 Sports Illustrated Swimsuit Issue, following other number one-ranked singles tennis stars: Steffi Graf (1997), Serena Williams (2004), Venus Williams (2005), Maria Sharapova (2006), Ana Ivanovic (2010) and Rafael Nadal (2012) who have appeared in the issue.

=== Olympics flagbearer ===
In the 2016 Summer Olympics, Wozniacki was the Denmark flag bearers at the opening ceremony.

=== Knighthood ===
In May 2018, Wozniacki was appointed Knight of the Order of the Dannebrog by the Queen of Denmark.

== Longest winning streak ==
Wozniacki performed a 13-match win streak in the 2010 US Open Series, which is the second longest of the 2010 season.

#	Tournament	Category	Start date	Surface	Seed	Round	Opponent	Rank	Score	CWR
–	Cincinnati Masters	Premier 5	9 August	Hard	2nd	3rd round	(France) Marion Bartoli	No. 20	1–6, 4–6	No. 3
–	Rogers Cup	Premier 5	16 August	Hard	2nd	1st round	Bye			No. 2
1.	Rogers Cup	Premier 5	16 August	Hard	2nd	2nd round	(Switzerland) Patty Schnyder	No. 52	7–5, 7–5	No. 2
2.	Rogers Cup	Premier 5	16 August	Hard	2nd	3rd round	(Italy) Flavia Pennetta	No. 20	4–6, 6–3, 6–1	No. 2
3.	Rogers Cup	Premier 5	16 August	Hard	2nd	Quarterfinals	(Italy) Francesca Schiavone	No. 7	6–3, 6–2	No. 2
4.	Rogers Cup	Premier 5	16 August	Hard	2nd	Semifinals	(Russia) Svetlana Kuznetsova	No. 16	6–3, 6–3	No. 2
5.	Rogers Cup	Premier 5	16 August	Hard	2nd	Final	(Russia) Vera Zvonareva	No. 11	6–3, 6–2	No. 2
–	Connecticut Open	Premier	23 August	Hard	1st	1st round	Bye			No. 2
6.	Connecticut Open	Premier	23 August	Hard	1st	2nd round	(Slovakia) Dominika Cibulková	No. 45	6–3, 6–2	No. 2
–	Connecticut Open	Premier	23 August	Hard	1st	Quarterfinals	(Italy) Flavia Pennetta	No. 21	Walkover	No. 2
7.	Connecticut Open	Premier	23 August	Hard	1st	Semifinals	(Russia) Elena Dementieva	No. 13	1–6, 6–3, 7–6^{(7–5)}	No. 2
8.	Connecticut Open	Premier	23 August	Hard	1st	Final	(Russia) Nadia Petrova	No. 19	6–3, 3–6, 6–3	No. 2
9.	US Open	Grand Slam	30 August	Hard	1st	1st round	(United States) Chelsey Gullickson	N/A	6–1, 6–1	No. 2
10.	US Open	Grand Slam	30 August	Hard	1st	2nd round	(Chinese Taipei) Chang Kai-chen	No. 84	6–0, 6–0	No. 2
11.	US Open	Grand Slam	30 August	Hard	1st	3rd round	(Chinese Taipei) Latisha Chan	No. 77	6–1, 6–0	No. 2
12.	US Open	Grand Slam	30 August	Hard	1st	4th round	(Russia) Maria Sharapova	No. 17	6–3, 6–4	No. 2
13.	US Open	Grand Slam	30 August	Hard	1st	Quarterfinals	(Slovakia) Dominika Cibulková	No. 45	6–2, 7–5	No. 2
–	US Open	Grand Slam	30 August	Hard	1st	Semifinals	(Russia) Vera Zvonareva	No. 8	4–6, 3–6	No. 2

== See also ==
- 2018 Caroline Wozniacki tennis season
- List of flag bearers for Denmark at the Olympics
- List of WTA number 1 ranked tennis players
- WTA Tour records

Sporting positions
Preceded by Serena Williams; Kim Clijsters; Simona Halep	World No. 1; 11 October 2010 – 13 February 2011; 21 February 2011 – 30 January 2012; 29 January 2018 – 26 February 2018	Succeeded by Kim Clijsters; Victoria Azarenka; Simona Halep
Preceded by Elena Dementieva	US Open Series Champion; 2010	Succeeded by Serena Williams
Preceded by Jessica Kirkland	Orange Bowl Girls' Singles Champion; Category: 18 and under 2005	Succeeded by Nikola Hofmanova
Awards
Preceded by Ágnes Szávay	WTA Newcomer of the Year; 2008	Succeeded by Melanie Oudin
Preceded by Serena Williams	ITF Women's Singles World Champion; 2010	Succeeded by Petra Kvitová
Preceded by Lotte Friis; Viktor Axelsen	Danish Sports Name of the Year; 2010; 2018	Succeeded by Jeanette Ottesen; Mads Pedersen
Preceded by Samantha Stosur; Petra Kvitová	Diamond Aces; 2011; 2015	Succeeded by Victoria Azarenka; Simona Halep
Olympic Games
Preceded by Kim Wraae Knudsen	Flagbearer for Denmark; Rio de Janeiro 2016	Succeeded by Sara Petersen & Jonas Warrer
