= 2018 İstanbul Cup =

- Date: 23–29 April
- Edition: 11th
- Category: WTA International
- Draw: 32S / 16D
- Prize money: $250,000
- Surface: Clay
- Location: Istanbul, Turkey

Champions

Singles
- (France) Pauline Parmentier

Doubles
- (China) Liang Chen / (China) Zhang Shuai
- İstanbul Cup

The 2018 İstanbul Cup (also known as the TEB BNP Paribas İstanbul Cup for sponsorship reasons) was a women's tennis tournament played on outdoor clay courts. It was the 11th edition of the İstanbul Cup, and part of the WTA International tournaments of the 2018 WTA Tour. It took place in Istanbul, Turkey, from 23 through 29 April 2018. Unseeded Pauline Parmentier won the singles title.

== Finals ==
=== Singles ===
(France) Pauline Parmentier defeated (Slovenia) Polona Hercog, 6–4, 3–6, 6–3

- It was Parmentier's 1s singles title of the year and the 3rd of her career.

=== Doubles ===
(China) Liang Chen / (China) Zhang Shuai defeated (Switzerland) Xenia Knoll / (United Kingdom) Anna Smith, 6–4, 6–4

== Points and prize money ==
Event	W	F	SF	QF	Round of 16	Round of 32	Q	Q2	Q1
Singles	280	180	110	60	30	1	18	12	1
Doubles	280	180	110	60	1	—N/a	—N/a	—N/a	—N/a

=== Prize money ===
Event	W	F	SF	QF	Round of 16	Round of 32	Q2	Q1
Singles	$43,000	$21,400	$11,500	$6,175	$3,400	$2,100	$1,020	$600
Doubles	$12,300	$6,400	$3,435	$1,820	$960	—N/a	—N/a	—N/a

== Singles main-draw entrants ==
=== Seeds ===
Country	Player	Rank^{1}	Seed
DEN	Caroline Wozniacki	2	1
RUS	Svetlana Kuznetsova	28	2
POL	Agnieszka Radwańska	29	3
CHN	Zhang Shuai	30	4
RUS	Ekaterina Makarova	32	5
ROU	Sorana Cîrstea	34	6
ROU	Irina-Camelia Begu	38	7
BLR	Aryna Sabalenka	47	8

- Rankings are as of April 16, 2018.

=== Other entrants ===
The following players received wildcards into the singles main draw:

- (Turkey) Ayla Aksu
- (Turkey) Çağla Büyükakçay
- (Turkey) İpek Öz

The following players received entry from the qualifying draw:

- (Russia) Valentyna Ivakhnenko
- (Slovenia) Dalila Jakupović
- (Russia) Anna Kalinskaya
- (Montenegro) Danka Kovinić
- (Netherlands) Arantxa Rus
- (Bulgaria) Viktoriya Tomova

=== Withdrawals ===
- (Brazil) Beatriz Haddad Maia → replaced by (United States) Christina McHale
- (Ukraine) Kateryna Kozlova → replaced by (Australia) Ajla Tomljanović
- (Germany) Tatjana Maria → replaced by (Italy) Sara Errani
- (Japan) Naomi Osaka → replaced by (Slovenia) Polona Hercog

=== Retirements ===
- (Ukraine) Kateryna Bondarenko
- (Poland) Agnieszka Radwańska
- (Denmark) Caroline Wozniacki

== Doubles main-draw entrants ==
=== Seeds ===
Country	Player	Country	Player	Rank^{1}	Seed
UKR	Kateryna Bondarenko	SRB	Aleksandra Krunić	109	1
NED	Bibiane Schoofs	CZE	Renata Voráčová	123	2
SUI	Xenia Knoll	GBR	Anna Smith	123	3
SLO	Dalila Jakupović	RUS	Irina Khromacheva	123	4

- ^{1} Rankings as of April 16, 2018.

=== Other entrants ===
The following pairs received wildcards into the doubles main draw:

- (Turkey) Ayla Aksu / (United Kingdom) Harriet Dart
- (Turkey) İpek Öz / (Turkey) Melis Sezer

=== Withdrawals ===
During the tournament

- (Ukraine) Kateryna Bondarenko
