= 2018 İstanbul Cup – Singles =

Singles
- 2018 İstanbul Cup

Final
- Champion: (France) Pauline Parmentier
- Runner-up: (Slovenia) Polona Hercog
- Score: 6–4, 3–6, 6–3

Details
- Draw: 32
- Seeds: 8

Events
Singles	Doubles
- İstanbul Cup

Elina Svitolina was the defending champion, but chose to compete in Stuttgart instead.

Pauline Parmentier won the title, her first since 2008, defeating Polona Hercog in the final, 6–4, 3–6, 6–3.

== Seeds ==
1. (Denmark) Caroline Wozniacki (quarterfinals, retired)
2. (Russia) Svetlana Kuznetsova (quarterfinals)
3. (Poland) Agnieszka Radwańska (first round, retired)
4. (China) Zhang Shuai (first round)
5. (Russia) Ekaterina Makarova (first round)
6. (Romania) Sorana Cîrstea (first round)
7. (Romania) Irina-Camelia Begu (semifinals)
8. (Belarus) Aryna Sabalenka (first round)

== Draw ==
Key

- Q = Qualifier
- WC = Wild card
- LL = Lucky loser
- Alt = Alternate
- ITF = ITF entry
- PR = Protected ranking
- SR = Special ranking
- SE = Special exempt
- JE = Junior exempt
- JR = Junior Accelerator Programme entrant
- CO = College Accelerator Programme entrant
- NG = Next Gen Accelerator Program entrant
- w/o = Walkover
- r = Retired
- d = Defaulted

=== Finals ===
Semifinals
(France) Pauline Parmentier	6	6
7	(Romania) Irina-Camelia Begu	3	4
(Greece) Maria Sakkari	4	2
(Slovenia) Polona Hercog	6	6

Final
(France) Pauline Parmentier	6	3	6
(Slovenia) Polona Hercog	4	6	3

=== Top half ===
First round
1	(Denmark) C Wozniacki	6	6
(Russia) E Alexandrova	2	2
(Italy) S Errani	6	6
(Belgium) K Flipkens	3	4
WC	(Turkey) A Aksu	2	2
(France) P Parmentier	6	6
(Kazakhstan) Y Putintseva	0	6	6
6	(Romania) S Cîrstea	6	1	0
3	(Poland) A Radwańska	1	0^{r}
(Croatia) D Vekić	6	2
(Australia) A Tomljanović	6	6
(Belgium) A Van Uytvanck	3	3
(Germany) M Barthel	6^{4}	6	3
(United States) C McHale	7^{7}	4	6
Q	(Slovenia) D Jakupović	5	0
7	(Romania) I-C Begu	7	6

Second round
1	(Denmark) C Wozniacki	5	6	6
(Italy) S Errani	7	3	3
(France) P Parmentier	6	2	6
(Kazakhstan) Y Putintseva	2	6	3
(Croatia) D Vekić	6	6
(Australia) A Tomljanović	1	2
(United States) C McHale	4	4
7	(Romania) I-C Begu	6	6

Quarterfinals
1	(Denmark) C Wozniacki	6	3	0^{r}
(France) P Parmentier	4	6	0
(Croatia) D Vekić	6	6^{1}	1
7	(Romania) I-C Begu	3	7^{7}	6

Semifinals
(France) P Parmentier	6	6
7	(Romania) I-C Begu	3	4

=== Bottom half ===
First round
5	(Russia) E Makarova	6	1	4
(Serbia) A Krunić	1	6	6
(Greece) M Sakkari	7	6
WC	(Turkey) Ç Büyükakçay	5	2
Q	(Montenegro) D Kovinić	6	6
Q	(Russia) A Kalinskaya	3	3
Q	(Netherlands) A Rus	6	6
4	(China) S Zhang	2	3
8	(Belarus) A Sabalenka	2	5
(Slovenia) P Hercog	6	7
WC	(Turkey) İ Öz	6	4	0
(Ukraine) K Bondarenko	4	6	6
Q	(Bulgaria) V Tomova	7	6
Q	(Russia) V Ivakhnenko	5	4
(China) Q Wang	3	3
2	(Russia) S Kuznetsova	6	6

Second round
(Serbia) A Krunić	3	1
(Greece) M Sakkari	6	6
Q	(Montenegro) D Kovinić	6	2	0
Q	(Netherlands) A Rus	2	6	6
(Slovenia) P Hercog	6	1
(Ukraine) K Bondarenko	2	1^{r}
Q	(Bulgaria) V Tomova	5	6	1
2	(Russia) S Kuznetsova	7	4	6

Quarterfinals
(Greece) M Sakkari	6	7^{8}
Q	(Netherlands) A Rus	3	6^{6}
(Slovenia) P Hercog	6	1	7
2	(Russia) S Kuznetsova	1	6	5

Semifinals
(Greece) M Sakkari	4	2
(Slovenia) P Hercog	6	6

== Qualifying ==
=== Seeds ===
1. (Netherlands) Richèl Hogenkamp (qualifying competition)
2. (Russia) Evgeniya Rodina (first round)
3. (Montenegro) Danka Kovinić (qualified)
4. (Netherlands) Arantxa Rus (qualified)
5. (Slovenia) Dalila Jakupović (qualified)
6. (Spain) Sara Sorribes Tormo (qualifying competition)
7. (Czech Republic) Barbora Krejčíková (qualifying competition)
8. (Russia) Anna Kalinskaya (qualified)
9. (Czech Republic) Tereza Martincová (first round)
10. (Bulgaria) Viktoriya Tomova (qualified)
11. (Japan) Misaki Doi (first round)
12. (Romania) Alexandra Dulgheru (first round)

=== Qualifiers ===
1. (Bulgaria) Viktoriya Tomova
2. (Russia) Valentyna Ivakhnenko
3. (Montenegro) Danka Kovinić
4. (Netherlands) Arantxa Rus
5. (Slovenia) Dalila Jakupović
6. (Russia) Anna Kalinskaya

==== First qualifier ====
First round
1	(Netherlands) Richèl Hogenkamp	6	7^{8}
WC	(Turkey) Melis Sezer	4	6^{6}
WC	(Australia) Sara Tomic	2	2
10	(Bulgaria) Viktoriya Tomova	6	6

Qualifying competition
1	(Netherlands) Richèl Hogenkamp	1	2
10	(Bulgaria) Viktoriya Tomova	6	6

==== Second qualifier ====
First round
2	(Russia) Evgeniya Rodina	2	2
(United Kingdom) Harriet Dart	6	6
(Russia) Valentyna Ivakhnenko	6	7^{7}
9	(Czech Republic) Tereza Martincová	3	6^{5}

Qualifying competition
(United Kingdom) Harriet Dart	0	0
(Russia) Valentyna Ivakhnenko	6	6

==== Third qualifier ====
First round
3	(Montenegro) Danka Kovinić	6	6
WC	(Australia) Kimberly Birrell	4	3
(Netherlands) Bibiane Schoofs	6	4	6
12	(Romania) Alexandra Dulgheru	4	6	3

Qualifying competition
3	(Montenegro) Danka Kovinić	6	3	6
(Netherlands) Bibiane Schoofs	3	6	3

==== Fourth qualifier ====
First round
4	(Netherlands) Arantxa Rus	7	6
(Russia) Irina Khromacheva	5	0
(Bulgaria) Elitsa Kostova	6	6
11	(Japan) Misaki Doi	4	2

Qualifying competition
4	(Netherlands) Arantxa Rus	6	6
(Bulgaria) Elitsa Kostova	2	0

==== Fifth qualifier ====
First round
5	(Slovenia) Dalila Jakupović	6	2	6
(Romania) Elena-Gabriela Ruse	4	6	2
PR	(Hungary) Réka Luca Jani	4	1
7	(Czech Republic) Barbora Krejčíková	6	6

Qualifying competition
5	(Slovenia) Dalila Jakupović	6	6
7	(Czech Republic) Barbora Krejčíková	2	1

==== Sixth qualifier ====
First round
6	(Spain) Sara Sorribes Tormo	6	7
(Turkey) Başak Eraydın	4	5
WC	(Croatia) Ena Kajević	4	4
8	(Russia) Anna Kalinskaya	6	6

Qualifying competition
6	(Spain) Sara Sorribes Tormo	3	7	3
8	(Russia) Anna Kalinskaya	6	5	6
