= 2018 Wuhan Open =

- Date: September 23–29
- Edition: 5th
- Category: WTA Premier 5
- Draw: 56S / 28D
- Prize money: $2,746,000
- Surface: Hard / outdoor
- Location: Wuhan, China
- Venue: Optics Valley Int'l Tennis Center

Champions

Singles
- (Belarus) Aryna Sabalenka

Doubles
- (Belgium) Elise Mertens / (Netherlands) Demi Schuurs
← 2017 ·	Wuhan Open	· 2019 →

The 2018 Wuhan Open (also known as the 2018 Dongfeng Motor Wuhan Open for sponsorship reasons) was a women's tennis tournament played on outdoor hard courts between September 23–29, 2018. It was the 5th edition of the Wuhan Open, and part of the WTA Premier 5 tournaments of the 2018 WTA Tour. The tournament was held at the Optics Valley International Tennis Center in Wuhan, China.

== Points and prize money ==
=== Point distribution ===
Event	W	F	SF	QF	Round of 16	Round of 32	Round of 64	Q	Q2	Q1
Singles	900	585	350	190	105	60	1	30	20	1
Doubles	900	585	350	190	105	1	—	—	—	—

=== Prize money ===
Event	W	F	SF	QF	Round of 16	Round of 32	Round of 64	Q2	Q1
Singles	$471,700	$235,520	$117,770	$54,230	$26,900	$13,790	$7,090	$3,955	$2,040
Doubles	$135,000	$68,200	$33,635	$16,990	$8,600	$4,255	—	—	—

== Singles main-draw entrants ==
=== Seeds ===
Country	Player	Ranking	Seeds
ROU	Simona Halep	1	1
DEN	Caroline Wozniacki	2	2
GER	Angelique Kerber	3	3
FRA	Caroline Garcia	4	4
CZE	Petra Kvitová	5	5
UKR	Elina Svitolina	6	6
~~JPN~~	~~Naomi Osaka~~	~~7~~	~~7~~
CZE	Karolína Plíšková	8	8
USA	Sloane Stephens	9	9
LAT	Jeļena Ostapenko	10	10
GER	Julia Görges	11	11
NED	Kiki Bertens	12	12
RUS	Daria Kasatkina	13	13
ESP	Garbiñe Muguruza	14	14
BEL	Elise Mertens	15	15
AUS	Ashleigh Barty	17	16

- Rankings are as of September 17, 2018

=== Other entrants ===
The following players received wild cards into the singles main draw:

- ~~(Belarus) Victoria Azarenka~~
- (United States) Bernarda Pera
- (Australia) Samantha Stosur
- (China) Wang Qiang
- (China) Zheng Saisai

The following players received entry from the singles qualifying draw:

- (Switzerland) Viktorija Golubic
- (United States) Sofia Kenin
- (Sweden) Rebecca Peterson
- (Puerto Rico) Monica Puig
- (Czech Republic) Kateřina Siniaková
- (Spain) Sara Sorribes Tormo
- (China) Wang Xiyu
- (China) Wang Yafan

The following players received entry as lucky losers:

- (Czech Republic) Markéta Vondroušová
- (Slovenia) Polona Hercog
- (Romania) Monica Niculescu

=== Withdrawals ===
- (Belarus) Victoria Azarenka → replaced by (Czech Republic) Markéta Vondroušová
- (Romania) Mihaela Buzărnescu → replaced by (Belgium) Kirsten Flipkens
- (Estonia) Kaia Kanepi → replaced by (Serbia) Aleksandra Krunić
- (Japan) Naomi Osaka → replaced by (Slovenia) Polona Hercog
- (Slovakia) Magdaléna Rybáriková → replaced by (Romania) Monica Niculescu

=== Retirements ===
- (Hungary) Tímea Babos
- (United States) Madison Keys
- (United States) CoCo Vandeweghe
- (China) Wang Qiang

== Doubles main-draw entrants ==
=== Seeds ===
Country	Player	Country	Player	Rank^{1}	Seed
HUN	Tímea Babos	FRA	Kristina Mladenovic	6	1
CZE	Andrea Sestini Hlaváčková	CZE	Barbora Strýcová	18	2
AUS	Ashleigh Barty	USA	CoCo Vandeweghe	27	3
CAN	Gabriela Dabrowski	CHN	Xu Yifan	27	4
SLO	Andreja Klepač	ESP	María José Martínez Sánchez	28	5
BEL	Elise Mertens	NED	Demi Schuurs	30	6
USA	Nicole Melichar	CZE	Květa Peschke	31	7
CZE	Lucie Hradecká	RUS	Ekaterina Makarova	48	8

- Rankings are as of September 17, 2018

=== Other entrants ===
The following pairs received wildcards into the doubles main draw:

- (China) Duan Yingying / (China) Wang Yafan
- (China) Jiang Xinyu / (China) Wang Qiang

=== Withdrawals ===
During the tournament

- (United States) Vania King

=== Retirements ===
- (United States) CoCo Vandeweghe

== Champions ==
=== Singles ===
- (Belarus) Aryna Sabalenka def. (Estonia) Anett Kontaveit, 6–3, 6–3

=== Doubles ===
- (Belgium) Elise Mertens / (Netherlands) Demi Schuurs def. (Czech Republic) Andrea Sestini Hlaváčková / (Czech Republic) Barbora Strýcová, 6–3, 6–3
