= 2018 Rogers Cup – Women's doubles =

Women's doubles
- 2018 Rogers Cup

Final
- Champions: (Australia) Ashleigh Barty (Netherlands) Demi Schuurs
- Runners-up: (Chinese Taipei) Latisha Chan (Russia) Ekaterina Makarova
- Score: 4–6, 6–3, [10–8]

Details
- Draw: 28
- Seeds: 8

Events
Singles	men	women
Doubles	men	women
- Rogers Cup

Ekaterina Makarova and Elena Vesnina were the two-time defending champions, but Vesnina chose not to participate this year.

Ashleigh Barty and Demi Schuurs won the title, defeating Makarova and Latisha Chan in the final, 4–6, 6–3, [10–8].

By reaching the final with Makarova, Chan regained the WTA no. 1 doubles ranking at the end of the tournament. Tímea Babos and Kateřina Siniaková were also in contention for the top ranking at the start of the tournament.

== Seeds ==
The top four seeds received byes into the second round.

1. (Czech Republic) Barbora Krejčíková / (Czech Republic) Kateřina Siniaková (second round)
2. (Chinese Taipei) Latisha Chan / (Russia) Ekaterina Makarova (final)
3. (Hungary) Tímea Babos / (France) Kristina Mladenovic (quarterfinals)
4. (Czech Republic) Andrea Sestini Hlaváčková / (Czech Republic) Barbora Strýcová (second round)
5. (Canada) Gabriela Dabrowski / (China) Xu Yifan (first round)
6. (Slovenia) Andreja Klepač / (Spain) María José Martínez Sánchez (semifinals)
7. (United States) Nicole Melichar / (Czech Republic) Květa Peschke (semifinals)
8. (Australia) Ashleigh Barty / (Netherlands) Demi Schuurs (champions)

== Draw ==
Key

- Q = Qualifier
- WC = Wild card
- LL = Lucky loser
- Alt = Alternate
- ITF = ITF entry
- PR = Protected ranking
- SR = Special ranking
- SE = Special exempt
- JE = Junior exempt
- JR = Junior Accelerator Programme entrant
- CO = College Accelerator Programme entrant
- NG = Next Gen Accelerator Program entrant
- w/o = Walkover
- r = Retired
- d = Defaulted

=== Finals ===
Semifinals
8	(Australia) Ashleigh Barty (Netherlands) Demi Schuurs	7	6
7	(United States) Nicole Melichar (Czech Republic) Květa Peschke	5	3
6	(Slovenia) Andreja Klepač (Spain) María José Martínez Sánchez	4	6^{3}
2	(Chinese Taipei) Latisha Chan (Russia) Ekaterina Makarova	6	7^{7}

Final
8	(Australia) Ashleigh Barty (Netherlands) Demi Schuurs	4	6	[10]
2	(Chinese Taipei) Latisha Chan (Russia) Ekaterina Makarova	6	3	[8]

=== Top half ===
First round
(Japan) S Aoyama (Belarus) L Marozava	w/o
(Romania) M Buzărnescu (Romania) M Niculescu
(United States) R Atawo (Germany) A-L Grönefeld	7	4	[4]
(Ukraine) L Kichenok (Latvia) J Ostapenko	5	6	[10]
(United States) B Mattek-Sands (Czech Republic) L Šafářová	2	5
8	(Australia) A Barty (Netherlands) D Schuurs	6	7
(Chinese Taipei) H-c Chan (China) Z Yang	6	6
WC	(Canada) F Abanda (Germany) T Maria	4	4
(Latvia) A Sevastova (Ukraine) E Svitolina	0	4
(Germany) J Görges (Czech Republic) Ka Plíšková	6	6
(Slovenia) D Jakupović (Czech Republic) R Voráčová	6	2	[5]
7	(United States) N Melichar (Czech Republic) K Peschke	2	6	[10]

Second round
1	(Czech Republic) B Krejčíková (Czech Republic) K Siniaková	6	6^{6}	[8]
(Japan) S Aoyama (Belarus) L Marozava	4	7^{8}	[10]
(Ukraine) L Kichenok (Latvia) J Ostapenko	3	4
8	(Australia) A Barty (Netherlands) D Schuurs	6	6
3	(Hungary) T Babos (France) K Mladenovic	w/o
(Chinese Taipei) H-c Chan (China) Z Yang
(Germany) J Görges (Czech Republic) Ka Plíšková
7	(United States) N Melichar (Czech Republic) K Peschke	w/o

Quarterfinals
(Japan) S Aoyama (Belarus) L Marozava	2	4
8	(Australia) A Barty (Netherlands) D Schuurs	6	6
3	(Hungary) T Babos (France) K Mladenovic	6	3	[6]
7	(United States) N Melichar (Czech Republic) K Peschke	2	6	[10]

Semifinals
8	(Australia) A Barty (Netherlands) D Schuurs	7	6
7	(United States) N Melichar (Czech Republic) K Peschke	5	3

=== Bottom half ===
First round
6	(Slovenia) A Klepač (Spain) MJ Martínez Sánchez	6	6
(Poland) A Rosolska (United States) A Spears	1	4
(Romania) I-C Begu (Romania) S Halep	6	6^{1}	[9]
(United Kingdom) J Konta (China) S Zhang	4	7^{7}	[11]
(Netherlands) K Bertens (Slovenia) K Srebotnik	7	6
(Russia) A Pavlyuchenkova (Belarus) A Sabalenka	5	3
5	(Canada) G Dabrowski (China) Y Xu	4	6	[6]
WC	(Canada) E Bouchard (United States) S Stephens	6	4	[10]
(Belgium) K Flipkens (Australia) D Gavrilova	6	6
WC	(Canada) C Branstine (Canada) R Marino	1	4
(Japan) M Kato (Japan) M Ninomiya	7	4	[10]
(Ukraine) N Kichenok (Australia) An Rodionova	5	6	[7]

Second round
6	(Slovenia) A Klepač (Spain) MJ Martínez Sánchez	w/o
(United Kingdom) J Konta (China) S Zhang
(Netherlands) K Bertens (Slovenia) K Srebotnik	6	7^{7}
4	(Czech Republic) A Sestini Hlaváčková (Czech Republic) B Strýcová	3	6^{3}
WC	(Canada) E Bouchard (United States) S Stephens	6	6
(Belgium) K Flipkens (Australia) D Gavrilova	0	4
(Japan) M Kato (Japan) M Ninomiya	1	3
2	(Chinese Taipei) L Chan (Russia) E Makarova	6	6

Quarterfinals
6	(Slovenia) A Klepač (Spain) MJ Martínez Sánchez	6	5	[10]
(Netherlands) K Bertens (Slovenia) K Srebotnik	3	7	[8]
WC	(Canada) E Bouchard (United States) S Stephens	4	2
2	(Chinese Taipei) L Chan (Russia) E Makarova	6	6

Semifinals
6	(Slovenia) A Klepač (Spain) MJ Martínez Sánchez	4	6^{3}
2	(Chinese Taipei) L Chan (Russia) E Makarova	6	7^{7}
