= 2018 Rogers Cup =

Canadian tennis tournament

- Date: August 6–12
- Edition: 129th (men) / 117th (women)
- Category: ATP World Tour Masters 1000 (men); WTA Premier 5 (women)
- Surface: Hard / outdoor
- Location: Toronto, Canada (men); Montréal, Canada (women)

Champions

Men's singles
- (Spain) Rafael Nadal

Women's singles
- (Romania) Simona Halep

Men's doubles
- (Finland) Henri Kontinen / (Australia) John Peers

Women's doubles
- (Australia) Ashleigh Barty / (Netherlands) Demi Schuurs
- Canadian Open

The 2018 Rogers Cup presented by National Bank was a tennis tournament played on outdoor hard courts. It was the 129th edition (for the men) and the 117th (for the women) of the Canadian Open. The tournament was part of the ATP World Tour Masters 1000 of the 2018 ATP World Tour, and of the WTA Premier 5 tournaments of the 2018 WTA Tour, and was also a 2018 US Open Series event. The men's event was held at the Aviva Centre in Toronto and the women's event was held at the IGA Stadium in Montréal, both from August 6 to August 12.

== Points and prize money ==
=== Point distribution ===
Event	W	F	SF	QF	Round of 16	Round of 32	Round of 64	Q	Q2	Q1
Men's singles	1000	600	360	180	90	45	10	25	16	0
Men's doubles	1000	600	360	180	90	0	—N/a	—N/a	—N/a	—N/a
Women's singles	900	585	350	190	105	60	1	30	20	1
Women's doubles	900	585	350	190	105	1	—N/a	—N/a	—N/a	—N/a

=== Prize money ===
Event	W	F	SF	QF	Round of 16	Round of 32	Round of 64	Q2	Q1
Men's singles	$1,020,425	$500,340	$251,815	$128,050	$66,490	$35,055	$18,930	$4,360	$2,220
Women's singles	$519,480	$252,425	$126,450	$60,210	$29,010	$14,860	$8,015	$3,260	$1,970
Men's doubles	$316,000	$154,710	$77,600	$39,830	$20,590	$10,860	—N/a	—N/a	—N/a
Women's doubles	$148,605	$75,060	$37,160	$18,705	$9,490	$4,690	—N/a	—N/a	—N/a

== ATP singles main-draw entrants ==
=== Seeds ===
The following are the seeded players. Seedings are based on ATP rankings as of July 30, 2018. Rankings and points before are as of August 6, 2018.

Seed	Rank	Player	Points before	Points defending	Points won	Points after	Status
1	1	(Spain) Rafael Nadal	9,310	90	1,000	10,220	Champion, defeated (Greece) Stefanos Tsitsipas
2	3	(Germany) Alexander Zverev	5,665	1,000	180	4,845	Quarterfinals lost to (Greece) Stefanos Tsitsipas
~~3~~	~~4~~	(Argentina) ~~Juan Martín del Potro~~	5,455	45	0	5,410	Withdrew due to left wrist injury
4	6	(South Africa) Kevin Anderson	4,355	180	360	4,535	Semifinals lost to (Greece) Stefanos Tsitsipas
5	5	(Bulgaria) Grigor Dimitrov	4,610	90	180	4,700	Quarterfinals lost to (South Africa) Kevin Anderson [4]
6	7	(Croatia) Marin Čilić	3,905	0	180	4,085	Quarterfinals lost to (Spain) Rafael Nadal [1]
7	8	(Austria) Dominic Thiem	3,665	10	10	3,665	Second round lost to (Greece) Stefanos Tsitsipas
8	9	(United States) John Isner	3,490	10	90	3,570	Third round lost to (Russia) Karen Khachanov
9	10	(Serbia) Novak Djokovic	3,355	0	90	3,445	Third round lost to (Greece) Stefanos Tsitsipas
10	11	(Belgium) David Goffin	3,120	45	10	3,085	First round lost to (Canada) Milos Raonic
11	12	(Argentina) Diego Schwartzman	2,470	180	90	2,380	Third round lost to (Croatia) Marin Čilić [6]
12	13	(Spain) Pablo Carreño Busta	2,290	45	45	2,290	Second round lost to (Russia) Karen Khachanov
13	19	(United States) Jack Sock	1,850	45	10	1,815	First round lost to (Russia) Daniil Medvedev [Q]
14	14	(Italy) Fabio Fognini	2,190	(90)^{†}	45	2,145	Second round lost to (Canada) Denis Shapovalov
~~15~~	~~15~~	(Spain) ~~Roberto Bautista Agut~~	2,000	180	0	1,820	Withdrew due to abdominal pain
16	17	(Australia) Nick Kyrgios	1,935	90	10	1,855	First round lost to (Switzerland) Stan Wawrinka [WC]

† The player used an exemption to skip the tournament in 2017. Accordingly, points for his 18th best result are deducted instead.

=== Withdrawals ===
The following players would have been seeded, but they withdrew from the event.

Rank	Player	Points before	Points defending	Points after	Reason
2	(Switzerland) Roger Federer	7,080	600	6,480	Scheduling

=== Other entrants ===
The following players received wild cards into the main singles draw:

- (Canada) Félix Auger-Aliassime
- (Canada) Peter Polansky
- (Canada) Vasek Pospisil
- (Switzerland) Stan Wawrinka

The following players received entry from the singles qualifying draw:

- (Russia) Evgeny Donskoy
- (United States) Ryan Harrison
- (France) Pierre-Hugues Herbert
- (Belarus) Ilya Ivashka
- (United States) Bradley Klahn
- (Russia) Daniil Medvedev
- (Japan) Yoshihito Nishioka

The following players received entry as lucky losers:

- (Bosnia and Herzegovina) Mirza Bašić
- (United States) Mackenzie McDonald
- (Russia) Mikhail Youzhny

=== Withdrawals ===
Before the tournament

- (Spain) Roberto Bautista Agut → replaced by (United States) Mackenzie McDonald
- (Czech Republic) Tomáš Berdych → replaced by (Japan) Yūichi Sugita
- (South Korea) Chung Hyeon → replaced by (Bosnia and Herzegovina) Mirza Bašić
- (Argentina) Juan Martín del Potro → replaced by (Russia) Mikhail Youzhny
- (Switzerland) Roger Federer → replaced by (France) Jérémy Chardy
- (France) Richard Gasquet → replaced by (Australia) Matthew Ebden
- (Germany) Philipp Kohlschreiber → replaced by (Hungary) Márton Fucsovics
- (Argentina) Leonardo Mayer → replaced by (France) Benoît Paire
- (France) Gaël Monfils → replaced by (United States) Frances Tiafoe
- (Italy) Andreas Seppi → replaced by (Portugal) João Sousa

=== Retirements ===
- (Japan) Yoshihito Nishioka

== ATP doubles main-draw entrants ==
=== Seeds ===
Country	Player	Country	Player	Rank^{1}	Seed
AUT	Oliver Marach	CRO	Mate Pavić	5	1
FIN	Henri Kontinen	AUS	John Peers	11	2
FRA	Pierre-Hugues Herbert	FRA	Nicolas Mahut	15	3
USA	Mike Bryan	USA	Jack Sock	16	4
POL	Łukasz Kubot	BRA	Marcelo Melo	19	5
GBR	Jamie Murray	BRA	Bruno Soares	27	6
NED	Jean-Julien Rojer	ROU	Horia Tecău	27	7
COL	Juan Sebastián Cabal	COL	Robert Farah	29	8

- Rankings are as of July 30, 2018

=== Other entrants ===
The following pairs received wildcards into the doubles main draw:

- (Canada) Félix Auger-Aliassime / (Canada) Denis Shapovalov
- (Canada) Daniel Nestor / (Canada) Vasek Pospisil

The following pairs received entry as alternates:

- (France) Jérémy Chardy / (France) Lucas Pouille
- (United States) Sam Querrey / (United States) Rajeev Ram
- (New Zealand) Artem Sitak / (Greece) Stefanos Tsitsipas

=== Withdrawals ===
Before the tournament

- (South Korea) Chung Hyeon
- (Italy) Fabio Fognini
- (Austria) Dominic Thiem

== WTA singles main-draw entrants ==
=== Seeds ===
Country	Player	Rank^{1}	Seed
ROU	Simona Halep	1	1
DEN	Caroline Wozniacki	2	2
USA	Sloane Stephens	3	3
GER	Angelique Kerber	4	4
UKR	Elina Svitolina	5	5
FRA	Caroline Garcia	6	6
~~ESP~~	~~Garbiñe Muguruza~~	~~7~~	~~7~~
CZE	Petra Kvitová	8	8
CZE	Karolína Plíšková	9	9
GER	Julia Görges	10	10
LAT	Jeļena Ostapenko	11	11
RUS	Daria Kasatkina	13	12
USA	Venus Williams	14	13
BEL	Elise Mertens	15	14
AUS	Ashleigh Barty	16	15
JPN	Naomi Osaka	17	16

- ^{1} Rankings are as of July 30, 2018

=== Other entrants ===
The following players received wild cards into the main singles draw:

- (Canada) Françoise Abanda
- (Belarus) Victoria Azarenka
- (Canada) Eugenie Bouchard
- ~~(United States) Serena Williams~~
- (Canada) Carol Zhao

The following player received entry as an alternate:

- (Germany) Tatjana Maria

The following players received entry from the singles qualifying draw:

- (Romania) Ana Bogdan
- (United Kingdom) Katie Boulter
- (United States) Caroline Dolehide
- (Belgium) Kirsten Flipkens
- (Bulgaria) Sesil Karatantcheva
- (Czech Republic) Barbora Krejčíková
- (United States) Christina McHale
- (Romania) Monica Niculescu
- (Czech Republic) Lucie Šafářová
- (Spain) Carla Suárez Navarro
- (China) Wang Qiang
- (Russia) Sofya Zhuk

The following player received entry as a lucky loser:

- (Puerto Rico) Monica Puig

=== Withdrawals ===
Before the tournament

- (Slovakia) Dominika Cibulková → replaced by (Belarus) Aryna Sabalenka
- (United States) Madison Keys → replaced by (Belgium) Alison Van Uytvanck
- (Spain) Garbiñe Muguruza → replaced by (Puerto Rico) Monica Puig
- (United States) CoCo Vandeweghe → replaced by (Romania) Sorana Cîrstea
- (United States) Serena Williams → replaced by (Germany) Tatjana Maria

=== Retirements ===
- (Romania) Mihaela Buzărnescu
- (Ukraine) Lesia Tsurenko

== WTA doubles main-draw entrants ==
=== Seeds ===
Country	Player	Country	Player	Rank^{1}	Seed
CZE	Barbora Krejčíková	CZE	Kateřina Siniaková	6	1
TPE	Latisha Chan	RUS	Ekaterina Makarova	8	2
HUN	Tímea Babos	FRA	Kristina Mladenovic	11	3
CZE	Andrea Sestini Hlaváčková	CZE	Barbora Strýcová	15	4
CAN	Gabriela Dabrowski	CHN	Xu Yifan	20	5
SLO	Andreja Klepač	ESP	María José Martínez Sánchez	24	6
USA	Nicole Melichar	CZE	Květa Peschke	32	7
AUS	Ashleigh Barty	NED	Demi Schuurs	33	8

- Rankings are as of July 30, 2018

=== Other entrants ===
The following pairs received wildcards into the doubles main draw:

- (Canada) Françoise Abanda / (Germany) Tatjana Maria
- (Canada) Eugenie Bouchard / (United States) Sloane Stephens
- (Canada) Carson Branstine / (Canada) Rebecca Marino

=== Withdrawals ===
Before the tournament

- (Romania) Mihaela Buzărnescu

During the tournament

- (Czech Republic) Karolína Plíšková
- (China) Yang Zhaoxuan
- (China) Zhang Shuai

== Finals ==
=== Men's singles ===
- (Spain) Rafael Nadal defeated (Greece) Stefanos Tsitsipas, 6–2, 7–6^{(7–4)}

=== Women's singles ===
- (Romania) Simona Halep defeated (United States) Sloane Stephens, 7–6^{(8–6)}, 3–6, 6–4

=== Men's doubles ===
- (Finland) Henri Kontinen / (Australia) John Peers defeated (South Africa) Raven Klaasen / (New Zealand) Michael Venus, 6–2, 6–7^{(7–9)}, [10–6]

=== Women's doubles ===
- (Australia) Ashleigh Barty / (Netherlands) Demi Schuurs defeated (Chinese Taipei) Latisha Chan / (Russia) Ekaterina Makarova, 4–6, 6–3, [10–8]
