= 2018 Rogers Cup – Men's doubles =

Men's doubles
- 2018 Rogers Cup

Final
- Champions: (Finland) Henri Kontinen (Australia) John Peers
- Runners-up: (South Africa) Raven Klaasen (New Zealand) Michael Venus
- Score: 6–2, 6–7^{(7–9)}, [10–6]

Details
- Draw: 28
- Seeds: 8

Events
Singles	men	women
Doubles	men	women
- Rogers Cup

Pierre-Hugues Herbert and Nicolas Mahut were the defending champions, but lost in the second round to Kevin Anderson and Novak Djokovic.

Henri Kontinen and John Peers won the title, defeating Raven Klaasen and Michael Venus in the final, 6–2, 6–7^{(7–9)}, [10–6].

== Seeds ==
All seeds received a bye into the second round.

1. (Austria) Oliver Marach / (Croatia) Mate Pavić (semifinals)
2. (Finland) Henri Kontinen / (Australia) John Peers (champions)
3. (France) Pierre-Hugues Herbert / (France) Nicolas Mahut (second round)
4. (United States) Mike Bryan / (United States) Jack Sock (quarterfinals)
5. (Poland) Łukasz Kubot / (Brazil) Marcelo Melo (second round)
6. (United Kingdom) Jamie Murray / (Brazil) Bruno Soares (second round)
7. (Netherlands) Jean-Julien Rojer / (Romania) Horia Tecău (quarterfinals)
8. (Colombia) Juan Sebastián Cabal / (Colombia) Robert Farah (second round)

== Draw ==
Key

- Q = Qualifier
- WC = Wild card
- LL = Lucky loser
- Alt = Alternate
- ITF = ITF entry
- PR = Protected ranking
- SR = Special ranking
- SE = Special exempt
- JE = Junior exempt
- JR = Junior Accelerator Programme entrant
- CO = College Accelerator Programme entrant
- NG = Next Gen Accelerator Program entrant
- w/o = Walkover
- r = Retired
- d = Defaulted

=== Finals ===
Semifinals
1	(Austria) Oliver Marach (Croatia) Mate Pavić	6	6^{5}	[3]
(South Africa) Raven Klaasen (New Zealand) Michael Venus	4	7^{7}	[10]
(Croatia) Nikola Mektić (Austria) Alexander Peya	6^{2}	6	[10]
2	(Finland) Henri Kontinen (Australia) John Peers	7^{7}	4	[12]

Final
(South Africa) Raven Klaasen (New Zealand) Michael Venus	2	7^{9}	[6]
2	(Finland) Henri Kontinen (Australia) John Peers	6	6^{7}	[10]

=== Top half ===
First round
(Bulgaria) G Dimitrov (Belgium) D Goffin	7^{7}	6
Alt	(France) J Chardy (France) L Pouille	6^{5}	4
(Japan) B McLachlan (Netherlands) M Middelkoop	5	6	[10]
(Croatia) B Ćorić (Netherlands) R Haase	7	3	[7]
(Spain) F López (Spain) M López	6^{6}	6	[10]
WC	(Canada) D Nestor (Canada) V Pospisil	7^{8}	2	[6]
(South Africa) R Klaasen (New Zealand) M Venus	6	6
Alt	(New Zealand) A Sitak (Greece) S Tsitsipas	4	4

Second round
1	(Austria) O Marach (Croatia) M Pavić	w/o
(Bulgaria) G Dimitrov (Belgium) D Goffin
(Japan) B McLachlan (Netherlands) M Middelkoop	3	6	[5]
7	(Netherlands) J-J Rojer (Romania) H Tecău	6	3	[10]
4	(United States) M Bryan (United States) J Sock	7^{7}	6
(Spain) F López (Spain) M López	6^{3}	3
(South Africa) R Klaasen (New Zealand) M Venus	6	5	[11]
5	(Poland) Ł Kubot (Brazil) M Melo	3	7	[9]

Quarterfinals
1	(Austria) O Marach (Croatia) M Pavić	6^{5}	7	[10]
7	(Netherlands) J-J Rojer (Romania) H Tecău	7^{7}	5	[6]
4	(United States) M Bryan (United States) J Sock	6^{5}	4
(South Africa) R Klaasen (New Zealand) M Venus	7^{7}	6

Semifinals
1	(Austria) O Marach (Croatia) M Pavić	6	6^{5}	[3]
(South Africa) R Klaasen (New Zealand) M Venus	4	7^{7}	[10]

=== Bottom half ===
First round
(Croatia) N Mektić (Austria) A Peya	6	6
(Croatia) I Dodig (Australia) N Kyrgios	2	2
(South Africa) K Anderson (Serbia) N Djokovic	6	6
WC	(Canada) F Auger-Aliassime (Canada) D Shapovalov	3	2
Alt	(United States) S Querrey (United States) R Ram	7^{7}	6
(Italy) M Cecchinato (Bosnia and Herzegovina) D Džumhur	6^{4}	3
(Spain) P Carreño Busta (Portugal) J Sousa	4	6	[10]
(France) É Roger-Vasselin (Spain) F Verdasco	6	2	[4]

Second round
6	(United Kingdom) J Murray (Brazil) B Soares	4	4
(Croatia) N Mektić (Austria) A Peya	6	6
(South Africa) K Anderson (Serbia) N Djokovic	4	6	[10]
3	(France) P-H Herbert (France) N Mahut	6	4	[7]
8	(Colombia) JS Cabal (Colombia) R Farah	5	6	[8]
Alt	(United States) S Querrey (United States) R Ram	7	4	[10]
(Spain) P Carreño Busta (Portugal) J Sousa	5	1
2	(Finland) H Kontinen (Australia) J Peers	7	6

Quarterfinals
(Croatia) N Mektić (Austria) A Peya	7	7
(South Africa) K Anderson (Serbia) N Djokovic	5	5
Alt	(United States) S Querrey (United States) R Ram	6^{7}	3
2	(Finland) H Kontinen (Australia) J Peers	7^{9}	6

Semifinals
(Croatia) N Mektić (Austria) A Peya	6^{2}	6	[10]
2	(Finland) H Kontinen (Australia) J Peers	7^{7}	4	[12]
