= 2018 US Open Series =

In tennis, the 2018 US Open Series was the fifteenth edition of the US Open Series, which comprised a group of hard court tournaments that started on July 23, 2018 in Atlanta and concluded in Connecticut for the women and in Winston-Salem for the men on August 26, 2018. This edition consisted of three separate men's tournaments and three women's tournaments, with the Western & Southern Open hosting both a men's and women's event. The series was headlined by two ATP World Tour Masters 1000 and two WTA Premier 5 events.

== Tournament Schedule ==
Legend
Grand Slam Event
ATP Masters 1000 and WTA Premier 5
ATP World Tour 500 and WTA Premier
ATP World Tour 250 and WTA International

Week	Date	Men's Events	Women's Events
1	July 23 – July 29	Atlanta; BB&T Atlanta Open; 2018 Champion: (United States) John Isner	No Series Event Held This Week
2	July 30 – August 5	No Series Event Held This Week	San Jose; Silicon Valley Classic; 2018 Champion: (Romania) Mihaela Buzărnescu
3	August 6 – August 12	Toronto; Rogers Cup presented by National Bank; 2018 Champion: (Spain) Rafael Nadal	Montreal; Rogers Cup presented by National Bank; 2018 Champion: (Romania) Simona Halep
4	August 13 – August 19	Cincinnati; Western & Southern Open; 2018 Champion: (Serbia) Novak Djokovic	Cincinnati; Western & Southern Open; 2018 Champion: (Netherlands) Kiki Bertens
5	August 20 – August 26	Winston-Salem; Winston-Salem Open; 2018 Champion: (Russia) Daniil Medvedev	New Haven; Connecticut Open; 2018 Champion: (Belarus) Aryna Sabalenka
6–7	August 27 – September 9	New York; US Open; 2018 Champion: (Serbia) Novak Djokovic	New York; US Open; 2018 Champion: (Japan) Naomi Osaka

== Week 1 ==
=== ATP – BB&T Atlanta Open ===
John Isner was the defending champion and successfully defended his title, defeating Ryan Harrison in a rematch of the 2017 final, 5–7, 6–3, 6–4.

==== Main Draw Finals ====
Quarterfinals
1	(United States) John Isner	7	4	6
7	(Germany) Mischa Zverev	5	6	1
4	(Australia) Matthew Ebden	6	6
(Cyprus) Marcos Baghdatis	3	2
8	(United States) Ryan Harrison	6^{3}	6	7^{7}
3/WC	(South Korea) Chung Hyeon	7^{7}	2	6^{5}
(United Kingdom) Cameron Norrie	7	3
2	(Australia) Nick Kyrgios	5	0^{r}

Semifinals
1	(United States) John Isner	6	6^{6}	6
4	(Australia) Matthew Ebden	4	7^{8}	1
8	(United States) Ryan Harrison	2	6	6
(United Kingdom) Cameron Norrie	6	3	2

Finals
1	(United States) John Isner	5	6	6
8	(United States) Ryan Harrison	7	3	4

== Week 2 ==
=== WTA – Silicon Valley Classic (San Jose) ===
Madison Keys was the defending champion, but withdrew due to a wrist injury.

Mihaela Buzărnescu won her first WTA Tour singles title, defeating Maria Sakkari in the final, 6–1, 6–0.

==== Main Draw Finals ====
Quarterfinals
(Belarus) Victoria Azarenka	7^{7}	0^{r}
(United States) Danielle Collins	6^{4}	3
3/WC	(United States) Venus Williams	4	6^{2}
(Greece) Maria Sakkari	6	7^{7}
(United Kingdom) Johanna Konta	6^{4}	3
4	(Belgium) Elise Mertens	7^{7}	6
5	(Romania) Mihaela Buzărnescu	6	7
(Australia) Ajla Tomljanović	1	5

Semifinals
(United States) Danielle Collins	6	5	2
(Greece) Maria Sakkari	3	7	6
4	(Belgium) Elise Mertens	6	3	1
5	(Romania) Mihaela Buzărnescu	4	6	6

Final
(Greece) Maria Sakkari	1	0
5	(Romania) Mihaela Buzărnescu	6	6

== Week 3 ==
=== ATP – Rogers Cup (Toronto) ===
Alexander Zverev was the defending champion, but lost in the quarterfinals to Stefanos Tsitsipas.

Rafael Nadal won his fourth Rogers Cup title, defeating Tsitsipas in the final, 6–2, 7–6^{(7–4)}.

==== Main Draw Finals ====
Quarterfinals
1	(Spain) Rafael Nadal	2	6	6
6	(Croatia) Marin Čilić	6	4	4
(Netherlands) Robin Haase	3	1
(Russia) Karen Khachanov	6	6
5	(Bulgaria) Grigor Dimitrov	2	2
4	(South Africa) Kevin Anderson	6	6
(Greece) Stefanos Tsitsipas	3	7^{13}	6
2	(Germany) Alexander Zverev	6	6^{11}	4

Semifinals
1	(Spain) Rafael Nadal	7^{7}	6
(Russia) Karen Khachanov	6^{3}	4
4	(South Africa) Kevin Anderson	7^{7}	4	6^{7}
(Greece) Stefanos Tsitsipas	6^{4}	6	7^{9}

Final
1	(Spain) Rafael Nadal	6	7^{7}
(Greece) Stefanos Tsitsipas	2	6^{4}

=== WTA – Rogers Cup (Montreal) ===
Elina Svitolina was the defending champion, but she lost to Sloane Stephens in the semifinals.

World No. 1 Simona Halep won the title, defeating Stephens in the final, 7–6^{(8–6)}, 3–6, 6–4.

==== Main Draw Finals ====
Quarterfinals
1	(Romania) Simona Halep	7	6
6	(France) Caroline Garcia	5	1
15	(Australia) Ashleigh Barty	6	6
(Netherlands) Kiki Bertens	3	1
(Latvia) Anastasija Sevastova	2	2
3	(United States) Sloane Stephens	6	6
5	(Ukraine) Elina Svitolina	7	6
14	(Belgium) Elise Mertens	5	3

Semifinals
1	(Romania) Simona Halep	6	6
15	(Australia) Ashleigh Barty	4	1
3	(United States) Sloane Stephens	6	6
5	(Ukraine) Elina Svitolina	3	3

Final
1	(Romania) Simona Halep	7^{8}	3	6
3	(United States) Sloane Stephens	6^{6}	6	4

== Week 4 ==
=== ATP – Western & Southern Open (Cincinnati) ===
Grigor Dimitrov was the defending champion, but lost to Novak Djokovic in the third round.

Djokovic won the title, defeating Roger Federer in the final, 6–4, 6–4, becoming the first player to win all nine ATP Masters 1000 events since its inception in 1990.

==== Main Draw Finals ====
Quarterfinals
(Canada) Milos Raonic	5	6	3
10	(Serbia) Novak Djokovic	7	4	6
13	(Spain) Pablo Carreño Busta	6^{7}	4
7	(Croatia) Marin Čilić	7^{9}	6
11	(Belgium) David Goffin	7^{7}	7^{7}
4	(Argentina) Juan Martín del Potro	6^{5}	6^{4}
WC	(Switzerland) Stan Wawrinka	7^{7}	6^{6}	2
2	(Switzerland) Roger Federer	6^{2}	7^{8}	6

Semifinals
10	(Serbia) Novak Djokovic	6	3	6
7	(Croatia) Marin Čilić	4	6	3
11	(Belgium) David Goffin	6^{3}	1^{r}
2	(Switzerland) Roger Federer	7^{7}	1

Final
10	(Serbia) Novak Djokovic	6	6
2	(Switzerland) Roger Federer	4	4

=== WTA – Western & Southern Open (Cincinnati) ===
Garbiñe Muguruza was the defending champion, but lost in the second round to Lesia Tsurenko.

Kiki Bertens won her first hard court & Premier 5 level title by beating Simona Halep in the final, 2–6, 7–6^{(8–6)}, 6–2.

==== Main Draw Finals ====
Quarterfinals
1	(Romania) Simona Halep	6	6
(Ukraine) Lesia Tsurenko	4	1
13	(United States) Madison Keys	3	4
(Belarus) Aryna Sabalenka	6	6
8	(Czech Republic) Petra Kvitová	7	5	6
15	(Belgium) Elise Mertens	5	7	3
5	(Ukraine) Elina Svitolina	4	3
(Netherlands) Kiki Bertens	6	6

Semifinals
1	(Romania) Simona Halep	6	6
(Belarus) Aryna Sabalenka	3	4
8	(Czech Republic) Petra Kvitová	6	4	2
(Netherlands) Kiki Bertens	3	6	6

Final
1	(Romania) Simona Halep	6	6^{6}	2
(Netherlands) Kiki Bertens	2	7^{8}	6

== Week 5 ==
=== ATP – Winston-Salem Open ===
Roberto Bautista Agut was the defending champion but chose not to participate this year.

Daniil Medvedev won the title, defeating Steve Johnson in the final, 6–4, 6–4.

==== Main Draw Finals ====
Quarterfinals
(Russia) Daniil Medvedev	7^{7}	6
(United States) Ryan Harrison	6^{4}	4
14	(Chile) Nicolás Jarry	6	2	1
(Japan) Taro Daniel	4	6	6
8	(United States) Steve Johnson	6	6
3/WC	(United Kingdom) Kyle Edmund	1	2
6	(South Korea) Chung Hyeon	3	4
2	(Spain) Pablo Carreño Busta	6	6

Semifinals
(Russia) Daniil Medvedev	6	6
(Japan) Taro Daniel	1	1
8	(United States) Steve Johnson	6	6
2	(Spain) Pablo Carreño Busta	3	4

Final
(Russia) Daniil Medvedev	6	6
8	(United States) Steve Johnson	4	4

=== WTA – Connecticut Open (New Haven) ===
Daria Gavrilova was the defending champion, but lost to Aryna Sabalenka in the second round.

Sabalenka went on to win her first WTA Tour title, defeating Carla Suárez Navarro in the final, 6–1, 6–4.

==== Main Draw Finals ====
Quarterfinals
LL	(Switzerland) Belinda Bencic	3	2
(Belarus) Aryna Sabalenka	6	6
(Russia) Ekaterina Makarova	4	2
5	(Germany) Julia Görges	6	6
(Spain) Carla Suárez Navarro	6	0
3	(Czech Republic) Petra Kvitová	3	0^{r}
Q	(Puerto Rico) Monica Puig	7	1	6
2	(France) Caroline Garcia	5	6	2

Semifinals
(Belarus) Aryna Sabalenka	6	7^{7}
5	(Germany) Julia Görges	4	6^{3}
(Spain) Carla Suárez Navarro	4
Q	(Puerto Rico) Monica Puig	4^{r}

Final
(Belarus) Aryna Sabalenka	6	6
(Spain) Carla Suárez Navarro	1	4

== Weeks 6–7 ==
=== ATP – US Open (New York) ===
Rafael Nadal was the defending champion, but retired in his semifinal match against Juan Martín del Potro.

Novak Djokovic won the title, his third at the US Open and 14th Grand Slam title overall, tying Pete Sampras, defeating del Potro in the final, 6–3, 7–6^{(7–4)}, 6–3.

==== Main Draw Finals ====
Quarterfinals
1	(Spain) Rafael Nadal	0	6	7	6^{4}	7^{7}
9	(Austria) Dominic Thiem	6	4	5	7^{7}	6^{5}
3	(Argentina) Juan Martín del Potro	6^{5}	6	7^{7}	6
11	(United States) John Isner	7^{7}	3	6^{4}	2
7	(Croatia) Marin Čilić	6	4	6^{5}	6	4
21	(Japan) Kei Nishikori	2	6	7^{7}	4	6
6	(Serbia) Novak Djokovic	6	6	6
(Australia) John Millman	3	4	4

Semifinals
1	(Spain) Rafael Nadal	6^{3}	2	0^{r}
3	(Argentina) Juan Martín del Potro	7^{7}	6	0
21	(Japan) Kei Nishikori	3	4	2
6	(Serbia) Novak Djokovic	6	6	6

Final
3	(Argentina) Juan Martín del Potro	3	6^{4}	3
6	(Serbia) Novak Djokovic	6	7^{7}	6

=== WTA – US Open (New York) ===
Sloane Stephens was the defending champion, but lost to Anastasija Sevastova in the quarterfinals.

Naomi Osaka won the title by defeating Serena Williams in the final, 6–2, 6–4.

==== Main Draw Finals ====
Quarterfinals
17	(United States) Serena Williams	6	6
8	(Czech Republic) Karolína Plíšková	4	3
3	(United States) Sloane Stephens	2	3
19	(Latvia) Anastasija Sevastova	6	6
30	(Spain) Carla Suárez Navarro	4	3
14	(United States) Madison Keys	6	6
20	(Japan) Naomi Osaka	6	6
(Ukraine) Lesia Tsurenko	1	1

Semifinals
17	(United States) Serena Williams	6	6
19	(Latvia) Anastasija Sevastova	3	0
14	(United States) Madison Keys	2	4
20	(Japan) Naomi Osaka	6	6

Final
17	(United States) Serena Williams	2	4
20	(Japan) Naomi Osaka	6	6
