= 2018 Rogers Cup – Men's singles =

Men's singles
- 2018 Rogers Cup

Final
- Champion: (Spain) Rafael Nadal
- Runner-up: (Greece) Stefanos Tsitsipas
- Score: 6–2, 7–6^{(7–4)}

Details
- Draw: 56 (7 Q / 4 WC )
- Seeds: 16

Events
Singles	men	women
Doubles	men	women
- Rogers Cup

Rafael Nadal defeated Stefanos Tsitsipas in the final, 6–2, 7–6^{(7–4)} to win the men's singles tennis title at the 2018 Rogers Cup. It was his fourth Canadian Open title and record-extending 33rd Masters 1000 title overall.

Alexander Zverev was the defending champion, but lost in the quarterfinals to Tsitsipas; Tsitsipas beat four top 10-ranked players en route to the final.

== Seeds ==
The top eight seeds receive a bye into the second round.

1. (Spain) Rafael Nadal (champion)
2. (Germany) Alexander Zverev (quarterfinals)
3. (Argentina) ~~Juan Martín del Potro~~ (withdrew due to a left wrist injury)
4. (South Africa) Kevin Anderson (semifinals)
5. (Bulgaria) Grigor Dimitrov (quarterfinals)
6. (Croatia) Marin Čilić (quarterfinals)
7. (Austria) Dominic Thiem (second round)
8. (United States) John Isner (third round)

9. (Serbia) Novak Djokovic (third round)
10. (Belgium) David Goffin (first round)
11. (Argentina) Diego Schwartzman (third round)
12. (Spain) Pablo Carreño Busta (second round)
13. (United States) Jack Sock (first round)
14. (Italy) Fabio Fognini (second round)
15. (Spain) ~~Roberto Bautista Agut~~ (withdrew)
16. (Australia) Nick Kyrgios (first round)

Click on the seed number of a player to go to their draw section.

== Draw ==
Key

- Q = Qualifier
- WC = Wild card
- LL = Lucky loser
- Alt = Alternate
- ITF = ITF entry
- PR = Protected ranking
- SR = Special ranking
- SE = Special exempt
- JE = Junior exempt
- JR = Junior Accelerator Programme entrant
- CO = College Accelerator Programme entrant
- NG = Next Gen Accelerator Program entrant
- w/o = Walkover
- r = Retired
- d = Defaulted

=== Finals ===
Quarterfinals
1	(Spain) Rafael Nadal	2	6	6
6	(Croatia) Marin Čilić	6	4	4
(Netherlands) Robin Haase	3	1
(Russia) Karen Khachanov	6	6
5	(Bulgaria) Grigor Dimitrov	2	2
4	(South Africa) Kevin Anderson	6	6
(Greece) Stefanos Tsitsipas	3	7^{13}	6
2	(Germany) Alexander Zverev	6	6^{11}	4

Semifinals
1	(Spain) Rafael Nadal	7^{7}	6
(Russia) Karen Khachanov	6^{3}	4
4	(South Africa) Kevin Anderson	7^{7}	4	6^{7}
(Greece) Stefanos Tsitsipas	6^{4}	6	7^{9}

Final
1	(Spain) Rafael Nadal	6	7^{7}
(Greece) Stefanos Tsitsipas	2	6^{4}

=== Top half ===
==== Section 1 ====
First round
(United States) J Donaldson	3	4
(France) B Paire	6	6
(Portugal) J Sousa	4	6^{2}
(Hungary) M Fucsovics	6	7^{7}
WC	(Switzerland) S Wawrinka	1	7	7
16	(Australia) N Kyrgios	6	5	5
11	(Argentina) D Schwartzman	6	6
(United Kingdom) K Edmund	1	2
(United States) S Querrey	6	7
(France) A Mannarino	2	5
WC	(Canada) V Pospisil	4	3
(Croatia) B Ćorić	6	6

Second round
1	(Spain) R Nadal	6	6
(France) B Paire	2	3
(Hungary) M Fucsovics	6	6^{2}	6^{10}
WC	(Switzerland) S Wawrinka	1	7^{7}	7^{12}
11	(Argentina) D Schwartzman	6	3	6
(United States) S Querrey	4	6	1
(Croatia) B Ćorić	3	6	1
6	(Croatia) M Čilić	6	3	6

Third round
1	(Spain) R Nadal	7	7^{7}
WC	(Switzerland) S Wawrinka	5	6^{4}
11	(Argentina) D Schwartzman	3	2
6	(Croatia) M Čilić	6	6

Quarterfinals
1	(Spain) R Nadal	2	6	6
6	(Croatia) M Čilić	6	4	4

==== Section 2 ====
First round
(Japan) K Nishikori	5	1
(Netherlands) R Haase	7	6
(France) J Chardy	1	4
(Canada) D Shapovalov	6	6
(United States) S Johnson	4	4
14	(Italy) F Fognini	6	6
12	(Spain) P Carreño Busta	6	0
Q	(Japan) Y Nishioka	0	0^{r}
(Serbia) F Krajinović	3	2
(Russia) K Khachanov	6	6
(Spain) A Ramos Viñolas	6	3	4
Q	(France) P-H Herbert	4	6	6

Second round
LL	(Russia) M Youzhny	5	2
(Netherlands) R Haase	7	6
(Canada) D Shapovalov	6	7
14	(Italy) F Fognini	3	5
12	(Spain) P Carreño Busta	4	6^{3}
(Russia) K Khachanov	6	7^{7}
Q	(France) P-H Herbert	6^{3}	2
8	(United States) J Isner	7^{7}	6

Third round
(Netherlands) R Haase	7	6
(Canada) D Shapovalov	5	2
(Russia) K Khachanov	7^{7}	7^{7}
8	(United States) J Isner	6^{5}	6^{1}

Quarterfinals
(Netherlands) R Haase	3	1
(Russia) K Khachanov	6	6

=== Bottom half ===
==== Section 3 ====
First round
(Germany) P Gojowczyk	2	2
(Spain) F Verdasco	6	6
(United States) F Tiafoe	7^{7}	6
(Italy) M Cecchinato	6^{3}	1
(Canada) M Raonic	6	6
10	(Belgium) D Goffin	3	4
LL	(United States) M McDonald	4	2
Q	(United States) R Harrison	6	6
(Japan) Y Sugita	2	3
Q	(Belarus) I Ivashka	6	6
Q	(Russia) E Donskoy	7^{9}	6
(Russia) A Rublev	6^{7}	4

Second round
5	(Bulgaria) G Dimitrov	4	6	7^{7}
(Spain) F Verdasco	6	2	6^{5}
(United States) F Tiafoe	7^{7}	4	6
(Canada) M Raonic	6^{4}	6	1
Q	(United States) R Harrison	6^{5}	4
Q	(Belarus) I Ivashka	7^{7}	6
Q	(Russia) E Donskoy	6	2	6^{0}
4	(South Africa) K Anderson	4	6	7^{7}

Third round
5	(Bulgaria) G Dimitrov	7^{7}	3	7^{7}
(United States) F Tiafoe	6^{1}	6	6^{4}
Q	(Belarus) I Ivashka	5	3
4	(South Africa) K Anderson	7	6

Quarterfinals
5	(Bulgaria) G Dimitrov	2	2
4	(South Africa) K Anderson	6	6

==== Section 4 ====
First round
(Bosnia and Herzegovina) D Džumhur	3	6^{3}
(Greece) S Tsitsipas	6	7^{7}
WC	(Canada) P Polansky	7^{7}	6
(Australia) M Ebden	6^{3}	4
LL	(Bosnia and Herzegovina) M Bašić	3	6^{3}
9	(Serbia) N Djokovic	6	7^{7}
13	(United States) J Sock	3	6	3
Q	(Russia) D Medvedev	6	3	6
WC	(Canada) F Auger-Aliassime	6	6
(France) L Pouille	4	3
Q	(United States) B Klahn	7^{7}	6
(Spain) D Ferrer	6^{5}	4

Second round
7	(Austria) D Thiem	3	6^{6}
(Greece) S Tsitsipas	6	7^{8}
WC	(Canada) P Polansky	3	4
9	(Serbia) N Djokovic	6	6
Q	(Russia) D Medvedev	3	6	7^{9}
WC	(Canada) F Auger-Aliassime	6	4	6^{7}
Q	(United States) B Klahn	4	4
2	(Germany) A Zverev	6	6

Third round
(Greece) S Tsitsipas	6	6^{5}	6
9	(Serbia) N Djokovic	3	7^{7}	3
Q	(Russia) D Medvedev	3	2
2	(Germany) A Zverev	6	6

Quarterfinals
(Greece) S Tsitsipas	3	7^{13}	6
2	(Germany) A Zverev	6	6^{11}	4

== Qualifying ==
=== Seeds ===
1. (United States) Ryan Harrison (qualified)
2. (United States) Jared Donaldson (moved to main draw)
3. (Russia) Daniil Medvedev (qualified)
4. (Tunisia) Malek Jaziri (first round)
5. (Spain) Feliciano López (first round)
6. (Russia) Evgeny Donskoy (qualified)
7. (France) Pierre-Hugues Herbert (qualified)
8. (United States) Mackenzie McDonald (qualifying competition, lucky loser)
9. (Bosnia and Herzegovina) Mirza Bašić (qualifying competition, lucky loser)
10. (Romania) Marius Copil (first round)
11. (Lithuania) Ričardas Berankis (first round)
12. (United States) Tim Smyczek (first round)
13. (Russia) Mikhail Youzhny (qualifying competition, withdrew, lucky loser)
14. (Sweden) Elias Ymer (qualifying competition, withdrew)
15. (United States) Bradley Klahn (qualified)

=== Qualifiers ===
1. (United States) Ryan Harrison
2. (United States) Bradley Klahn
3. (Russia) Daniil Medvedev
4. (Japan) Yoshihito Nishioka
5. (Belarus) Ilya Ivashka
6. (Russia) Evgeny Donskoy
7. (France) Pierre-Hugues Herbert

=== Lucky losers ===
1. (United States) Mackenzie McDonald
2. (Bosnia and Herzegovina) Mirza Bašić
3. (Russia) Mikhail Youzhny

=== Qualifying draw ===
==== First qualifier ====
First round
1	(United States) Ryan Harrison	6	7^{7}
(Latvia) Ernests Gulbis	3	6^{3}
(France) Nicolas Mahut	7^{7}	3	7
12	(United States) Tim Smyczek	6^{5}	6	5

Qualifying competition
1	(United States) Ryan Harrison	6	6
(France) Nicolas Mahut	1	2

==== Second qualifier ====
First round
15	(United States) Bradley Klahn	7	3
(Australia) Bernard Tomic	5	0^{r}
Alt	(United States) Christian Harrison	4	4
9	(Bosnia and Herzegovina) Mirza Bašić	6	6

Qualifying competition
15	(United States) Bradley Klahn	6	7^{7}
9	(Bosnia and Herzegovina) Mirza Bašić	1	6^{4}

==== Third qualifier ====
First round
3	(Russia) Daniil Medvedev	6	6
(Slovakia) Norbert Gombos	3	0
WC	(Canada) Brayden Schnur	7^{7}	3	3
8	(United States) Mackenzie McDonald	6^{4}	6	6

Qualifying competition
3	(Russia) Daniil Medvedev	7^{7}	6
8	(United States) Mackenzie McDonald	6^{3}	4

==== Fourth qualifier ====
First round
4	(Tunisia) Malek Jaziri	4	5
(Canada) Filip Peliwo	6	7
Alt	(Japan) Yoshihito Nishioka	2	6	7^{7}
10	(Romania) Marius Copil	6	3	6^{2}

Qualifying competition
(Canada) Filip Peliwo	7	1	4
Alt	(Japan) Yoshihito Nishioka	5	6	6

==== Fifth qualifier ====
First round
5	(Spain) Feliciano López	3	6^{4}
(Italy) Stefano Travaglia	6	7^{7}
(Belarus) Ilya Ivashka	7^{7}	6
11	(Lithuania) Ričardas Berankis	6^{5}	2

Qualifying competition
(Italy) Stefano Travaglia	6^{5}	2
(Belarus) Ilya Ivashka	7^{7}	6

==== Sixth qualifier ====
First round
6	(Russia) Evgeny Donskoy	6	6
WC	(Canada) Frank Dancevic	3	4
WC	(Canada) Alexis Galarneau	3	4
13	(Russia) Mikhail Youzhny	6	6

Qualifying competition
6	(Russia) Evgeny Donskoy	w/o
13	(Russia) Mikhail Youzhny

==== Seventh qualifier ====
First round
7	(France) Pierre-Hugues Herbert	4	7	6
(Poland) Hubert Hurkacz	6	5	3
WC	(Canada) Benjamin Sigouin	5	3
14	(Sweden) Elias Ymer	7	6

Qualifying competition
7	(France) Pierre-Hugues Herbert	w/o
14	(Sweden) Elias Ymer
