= 2018 Western & Southern Open =

- Date: August 13–19
- Edition: 117th (men) / 90th (women)
- Category: ATP World Tour Masters 1000 (men); WTA Premier 5 (women)
- Surface: Hard
- Location: Mason, Ohio, United States
- Venue: Lindner Family Tennis Center

Champions

Men's singles
- (Serbia) Novak Djokovic

Women's singles
- (Netherlands) Kiki Bertens

Men's doubles
- (United Kingdom) Jamie Murray / (Brazil) Bruno Soares

Women's doubles
- (Czech Republic) Lucie Hradecká / (Russia) Ekaterina Makarova
← 2017 ·	Western & Southern Open	· 2019 →

The 2018 Western & Southern Open was a men's and women's tennis tournament played on outdoor hard courts from August 13–19, 2018. It took place at the Lindner Family Tennis Center in Mason, Ohio, a northern suburb of Cincinnati, in the United States. It was a Masters 1000 tournament on the 2018 ATP World Tour and a WTA Premier 5 tournament on the 2018 WTA Tour. The tournament was one of two headline events in the 2018 US Open Series. The 2018 tournament was the 117th men's edition and the 90th women's edition of the Cincinnati Open.

== Points and prize money ==
=== Point distribution ===
Event	W	F	SF	QF	Round of 16	Round of 32	Round of 64	Q	Q2	Q1
Men's singles	1000	600	360	180	90	45	10	25	16	0
Men's doubles	1000	600	360	180	90	0	—	—	—	—
Women's singles	900	585	350	190	105	60	1	30	20	1
Women's doubles	900	585	350	190	105	5	—	—	—	—

=== Prize money ===
Event	W	F	SF	QF	Round of 16	Round of 32	Round of 64	Q2	Q1
Men's singles	$1,020,425	$500,340	$251,815	$128,050	$66,490	$35,055	$18,930	$4,360	$2,220
Women's singles	$501,975	$243,920	$122,190	$58,185	$28,030	$14,360	$7,745	$3,150	$1,905
Men's doubles	$316,000	$154,710	$77,600	$39,830	$20,590	$10,860	—	—	—
Women's doubles	$143,600	$72,534	$35,910	$18,075	$9,170	$4,530	—	—	—

== ATP singles main-draw entrants ==
=== Seeds ===
The following are the seeded players. Seedings are based on ATP rankings as of August 6, 2018. Rankings and points before are as of August 13, 2018.

Seed	Rank	Player	Points before	Points defending	Points won	Points after	Status
~~1~~	~~1~~	~~(Spain) Rafael Nadal~~	10,220	180	0	10,040	Withdrew due to schedule change
2	2	(Switzerland) Roger Federer	6,480	0	600	7,080	Runner-up, lost to (Serbia) Novak Djokovic [10]
3	4	(Germany) Alexander Zverev	4,845	10	10	4,845	Second round lost to (Netherlands) Robin Haase
4	3	(Argentina) Juan Martín del Potro	5,410	90	180	5,500	Quarterfinals lost to (Belgium) David Goffin [11]
5	5	(Bulgaria) Grigor Dimitrov	4,700	1,000	90	3,790	Third round lost to (Serbia) Novak Djokovic [10]
6	6	(South Africa) Kevin Anderson	4,535	10	90	4,615	Third round lost to (Belgium) David Goffin [11]
7	7	(Croatia) Marin Čilić	4,085	0	360	4,445	Semifinals lost to (Serbia) Novak Djokovic [10]
~~8~~	~~8~~	~~(Austria) Dominic Thiem~~	3,665	180	0	3,485	Withdrew due to illness
9	9	(United States) John Isner	3,570	360	10	3,220	First round lost to (United States) Sam Querrey
10	10	(Serbia) Novak Djokovic	3,445	0	1,000	4,445	Champion, defeated (Switzerland) Roger Federer [2]
11	11	(Belgium) David Goffin	3,085	10	360	3,435	Semifinals retired against (Switzerland) Roger Federer [2]
12	12	(Argentina) Diego Schwartzman	2,380	10	10	2,380	First round lost to (Switzerland) Stan Wawrinka [WC]
13	13	(Spain) Pablo Carreño Busta	2,290	90	180	2,380	Quarterfinals lost to (Croatia) Marin Čilić [6]
14	16	(United Kingdom) Kyle Edmund	1,950	10	45	1,985	Second round lost to (Canada) Denis Shapovalov
15	18	(Australia) Nick Kyrgios	1,855	600	90	1,345	Third round lost to (Argentina) Juan Martín del Potro [3]
16	17	(France) Lucas Pouille	1,870	0	45	1,915	Second round lost to (Argentina) Leonardo Mayer

=== Withdrawals ===
The following players would have been seeded, but they withdrew from the event.

Rank	Player	Points before	Points defending	Points after	Reason
14	(Italy) Fabio Fognini	2,145	45	2,190†	Fatigue

† Fognini is entitled to use an exemption to skip the tournament and substitute his 18th best result (90 points) in its stead. Accordingly, his points after the tournament will remain unchanged.

=== Other entrants ===
The following players received wild cards into the main singles draw:

- (United States) Mackenzie McDonald
- (United Kingdom) Andy Murray
- (United States) Frances Tiafoe
- (Switzerland) Stan Wawrinka

The following players received entry from the singles qualifying draw:

- (Romania) Marius Copil
- (Poland) Hubert Hurkacz
- (United States) Bradley Klahn
- (United States) Denis Kudla
- (Serbia) Dušan Lajović
- (Russia) Daniil Medvedev
- (United States) Michael Mmoh

The following players received entry as lucky losers:

- (Spain) Guillermo García López
- (Tunisia) Malek Jaziri

=== Withdrawals ===
Before the tournament

- (Spain) Roberto Bautista Agut → replaced by (France) Benoît Paire
- (Czech Republic) Tomáš Berdych → replaced by (Portugal) João Sousa
- (Italy) Fabio Fognini → replaced by (France) Jérémy Chardy
- (France) Gaël Monfils → replaced by (Hungary) Márton Fucsovics
- (Spain) Rafael Nadal → replaced by (Tunisia) Malek Jaziri
- (Austria) Dominic Thiem → replaced by (Spain) Guillermo García López

=== Retirements ===
- (Belgium) David Goffin

== ATP doubles main-draw entrants ==
=== Seeds ===
Country	Player	Country	Player	Rank^{1}	Seed
AUT	Oliver Marach	CRO	Mate Pavić	5	1
USA	Mike Bryan	USA	Jack Sock	9	2
FIN	Henri Kontinen	AUS	John Peers	9	3
GBR	Jamie Murray	BRA	Bruno Soares	19	4
POL	Łukasz Kubot	BRA	Marcelo Melo	25	5
NED	Jean-Julien Rojer	ROU	Horia Tecău	28	6
COL	Juan Sebastián Cabal	COL	Robert Farah	31	7
FRA	Nicolas Mahut	FRA	Édouard Roger-Vasselin	32	8

- Rankings are as of August 6, 2018

=== Other entrants ===
The following pairs received wildcards into the doubles main draw:

- (United States) Ryan Harrison / (United States) Nicholas Monroe
- (United States) Mackenzie McDonald / (Canada) Daniel Nestor

The following pair received entry as alternates:

- (Argentina) Leonardo Mayer / (Spain) Albert Ramos Viñolas

=== Withdrawals ===
Before the tournament

- (Austria) Dominic Thiem

During the tournament

- (Austria) Alexander Peya

== WTA singles main-draw entrants ==
=== Seeds ===
Country	Player	Rank^{1}	Seed
ROU	Simona Halep	1	1
DEN	Caroline Wozniacki	2	2
USA	Sloane Stephens	3	3
GER	Angelique Kerber	4	4
UKR	Elina Svitolina	5	5
FRA	Caroline Garcia	6	6
ESP	Garbiñe Muguruza	7	7
CZE	Petra Kvitová	8	8
CZE	Karolína Plíšková	9	9
GER	Julia Görges	10	10
LAT	Jeļena Ostapenko	11	11
RUS	Daria Kasatkina	12	12
USA	Madison Keys	13	13
~~USA~~	~~Venus Williams~~	~~14~~	~~14~~
BEL	Elise Mertens	15	15
AUS	Ashleigh Barty	16	16
JPN	Naomi Osaka	17	17

- ^{1} Rankings are as of August 6, 2018

=== Other entrants ===
The following players received wild cards into the main singles draw:

- (United States) Amanda Anisimova
- (Belarus) Victoria Azarenka
- (Russia) Svetlana Kuznetsova
- (United States) Bethanie Mattek-Sands
- (Czech Republic) Markéta Vondroušová

The following player received entry using a protected ranking:

- (United States) Serena Williams

The following players received entry from the singles qualifying draw:

- (Romania) Ana Bogdan
- (France) Alizé Cornet
- (Estonia) Kaia Kanepi
- (United States) Allie Kiick
- (Slovakia) Viktória Kužmová
- (United States) Varvara Lepchenko
- (Germany) Tatjana Maria
- (Croatia) Petra Martić
- (Sweden) Rebecca Peterson
- (Belarus) Aliaksandra Sasnovich
- (Australia) Ajla Tomljanović
- (Switzerland) Stefanie Vögele

The following player received entry as a lucky loser:

- (Italy) Camila Giorgi

=== Withdrawals ===
Before the tournament

- (Romania) Mihaela Buzărnescu → replaced by (United States) Danielle Collins
- (Slovakia) Dominika Cibulková → replaced by (Hungary) Tímea Babos
- (Russia) Maria Sharapova → replaced by (Czech Republic) Kateřina Siniaková
- (United States) Venus Williams → replaced by (Italy) Camila Giorgi
- (China) Zhang Shuai → replaced by (Serbia) Aleksandra Krunić

=== Retirements ===
- (Denmark) Caroline Wozniacki

== WTA doubles main-draw entrants ==
=== Seeds ===
Country	Player	Country	Player	Rank^{1}	Seed
CZE	Barbora Krejčíková	CZE	Kateřina Siniaková	6	1
HUN	Tímea Babos	FRA	Kristina Mladenovic	11	2
CZE	Andrea Sestini Hlaváčková	CZE	Barbora Strýcová	15	3
SLO	Andreja Klepač	ESP	María José Martínez Sánchez	26	4
USA	Nicole Melichar	CZE	Květa Peschke	30	5
BEL	Elise Mertens	NED	Demi Schuurs	45	6
CZE	Lucie Hradecká	RUS	Ekaterina Makarova	52	7
ROU	Irina-Camelia Begu	ROU	Monica Niculescu	57	8

- Rankings are as of August 6, 2018

=== Other entrants ===
The following pairs received wildcards into the doubles main draw:

- (United States) Jennifer Brady / (United States) Caroline Dolehide
- (United States) Lauren Davis / (United States) Nicole Gibbs

The following pair received entry as alternates:

- (United States) Kaitlyn Christian / (United States) Sabrina Santamaria

=== Withdrawals ===
Before the tournament

- (Australia) Ashleigh Barty

=== Retirements ===
- (United States) Bethanie Mattek-Sands

== Champions ==
=== Men's singles ===
- (Serbia) Novak Djokovic def. (Switzerland) Roger Federer, 6–4, 6–4

=== Women's singles ===
- (Netherlands) Kiki Bertens def. (Romania) Simona Halep, 2–6, 7–6^{(8–6)}, 6–2

=== Men's doubles ===
- (United Kingdom) Jamie Murray / (Brazil) Bruno Soares def. (Colombia) Juan Sebastián Cabal / (Colombia) Robert Farah, 4–6, 6–3, [10–6]

=== Women's doubles ===
- (Czech Republic) Lucie Hradecká / (Russia) Ekaterina Makarova def. (Belgium) Elise Mertens / (Netherlands) Demi Schuurs, 6–2, 7–5
