= Elina Svitolina =

Ukrainian tennis player (born 1994)

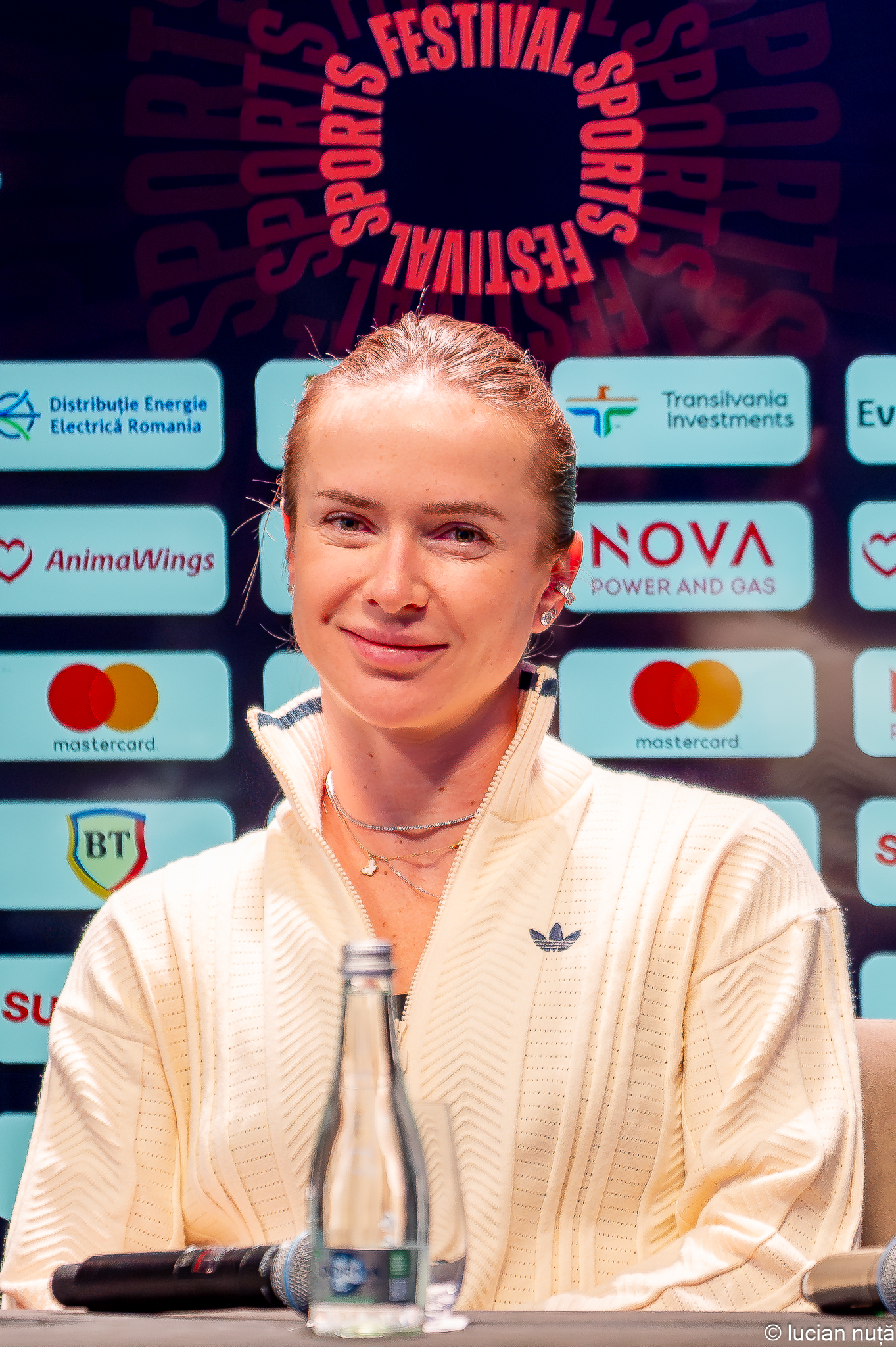
- Svitolina in 2026
- Full name: Elina Mykhailivna Svitolina
- Native name: Еліна Михайлівна Світоліна
- Country (sports): Ukraine
- Residence: Switzerland
- Born: 12 September 1994 (age 32) Odesa, Ukraine
- Height: 1.74 m (5 ft 9 in)
- Turned pro: 2008
- Plays: Right-handed (two-handed backhand)
- Coach: Andrew Bettles
- Prize money: US $32,679,541: 12th all-time in earnings
- Official website: Elina Svitolina Foundation in Ukraine

Singles
- Career record: 560–285
- Career titles: 20
- Highest ranking: No. 3 (11 September 2017)
- Current ranking: No. 6 (16 November 2026)

Grand Slam singles results
- Australian Open: SF (2026)
- French Open: QF (2015, 2017, 2020, 2023, 2025, 2026)
- Wimbledon: SF (2019, 2023)
- US Open: SF (2019)

Other tournaments
- Tour Finals: W (2018)
- Olympic Games: Bronze (2021)

Doubles
- Career record: 48–69
- Career titles: 2
- Highest ranking: No. 108 (4 May 2015)

Grand Slam doubles results
- Australian Open: 1R (2014, 2016)
- French Open: 2R (2014)
- Wimbledon: 2R (2016)
- US Open: 2R (2014)

Other doubles tournaments
- Olympic Games: 1R (2016, 2021)

Grand Slam mixed doubles results
- Australian Open: SF (2017)
- French Open: 2R (2015, 2017)
- Wimbledon: 3R (2014)
- US Open: SF (2026)

Team competitions
- BJK Cup: F (2026)
- Hopman Cup: F (2016)
Medal record
Representing Ukraine
Olympic Games
| Bronze medal – third place | 2020 Tokyo | Singles |
- Last updated on: 25 August 2026.

Elina Mykhailivna Svitolina (Ukrainian: Еліна Михайлівна Світоліна, pronounced [eˈl⁽ʲ⁾inɐ s⁽ʲ⁾wiˈtɔl⁽ʲ⁾inɐ]; born 12 September 1994) is a Ukrainian professional tennis player. She has career-high rankings of world No. 3 in singles and No. 108 in doubles from the Women's Tennis Association (WTA). Svitolina has won 20 WTA Tour singles titles, including the 2018 WTA Finals and five WTA 1000–level tournaments, and has reached four major semifinals.

Svitolina first broke into the world's top 50 in July 2013 and the top 10 in May 2017, becoming the highest-ranked Ukrainian woman in history. She reached consecutive major semifinals in 2019 at Wimbledon and the US Open. In 2021, she won an Olympic bronze medal in the women's singles tournament at the 2020 Tokyo Olympics.

In 2022, Svitolina took a break from professional tennis to give birth to her first child. She made a strong comeback upon her return to competition in 2023, reaching the French Open quarterfinals and the Wimbledon semifinals. She achieved consistent success in the following years, culminating in an Australian Open semifinal and return to the top 10 in 2026.

== Early life and background ==
Svitolina was born in Odesa to Ukrainian parents, Mikhaylo Svitolin (a former wrestler) and Olena Svitolina (a former competitive rower). She has a Jewish grandmother. She was named after the famous Soviet actress Elina Bystritskaya. She has an older brother, Yulian. As a child, she noticed that her brother was getting a lot of attention for playing tennis. This inspired her to take up the sport to regain some of her father's attention. She started playing at age five. Svitolina and her family moved to Kharkiv, Ukraine, when she was 13, after businessman Yuriy Sapronov became her sponsor. Sapronov had seen her play at one of his children's tournaments when she was 12 and was impressed, leading to his investment in her training and further professional development.

Svitolina officially still resides in Kharkiv but trains abroad, which limits her presence in Odesa and/or Kharkiv, and also has a residence in London. She has said that in her early career she turned down offers to change her citizenship in exchange for "large financial sums". Having spoken Russian most of her life, Svitolina has been actively learning the Ukrainian and French languages since the COVID-19 quarantine at the 2021 Australian Open. In January 2022, she promised, in an interview with Dmitry Gordon, to master the Ukrainian language.

== Career ==
=== The beginnings ===
Yulian Svitolin began full time coaching career in 2003 as a head coach of his younger sister, Elina Svitolina. Yulian Svitolin worked with Elina for 5 years. She was 14 years old at that time and made a tremendous improvement and break through at the age of 15 by winning the Grand Slam, Roland Garros. Svitolina's greatest achievement as a junior was winning the French Open girls event in 2010, beating Tunisian Ons Jabeur in the final. She reached her first professional singles final at the $25k tournament in Kharkiv in May 2010. She also reached the final of the girls' singles event at the 2012 Wimbledon Championships, where she lost to Eugenie Bouchard.

Svitolina made her WTA Tour main-draw debut at the 2012 Baku Cup. She qualified for the US Open and was defeated in the first round by 12th seed and eventual quarterfinalist Ana Ivanovic. She won the WTA 125 Royal Indian Open title in Pune, defeating Andreja Klepač, Rutuja Bhosale, Luksika Kumkhum, former top-10 player Andrea Petkovic, and Japanese veteran Kimiko Date-Krumm in the final.

=== 2013: WTA Tour title ===
Svitolina gained direct entry into the 2013 Australian Open, where she was defeated by fifth seed Angelique Kerber in the first round. She won her first WTA title at the Baku Cup by beating Shahar Pe'er; in doing so, Svitolina became the first teenager to win a WTA tournament since February 2012. The victory led to a jump of 32 spots in the WTA rankings, landing her at No. 49 on 29 July 2013.

=== 2014: Ascent, second career title ===
At the 2014 Australian Open, Svitolina defeated two-time Grand Slam champion and three-time Australian Open quarterfinalist Svetlana Kuznetsova in the opening round in straight sets. She went on to reach the third round, losing to Sloane Stephens in straight sets.

After defending her Baku Cup title by beating Bojana Jovanovski in the final, Svitolina played at the Western & Southern Open where she recorded the first top-ten victory of her career, defeating recently crowned Wimbledon champion Petra Kvitová in the second round. She proceeded to reach her first quarterfinal at Premier-5 level, eventually losing to Ana Ivanovic in straight sets.

Svitolina reached her first Premier-5 semifinal in the first edition of the WTA tournament in Wuhan, defeating Camila Giorgi, Sabine Lisicki, Garbiñe Muguruza via walkover, and Angelique Kerber before losing to Petra Kvitová in the semifinals.

=== 2015: First major quarterfinal, No. 15 ===
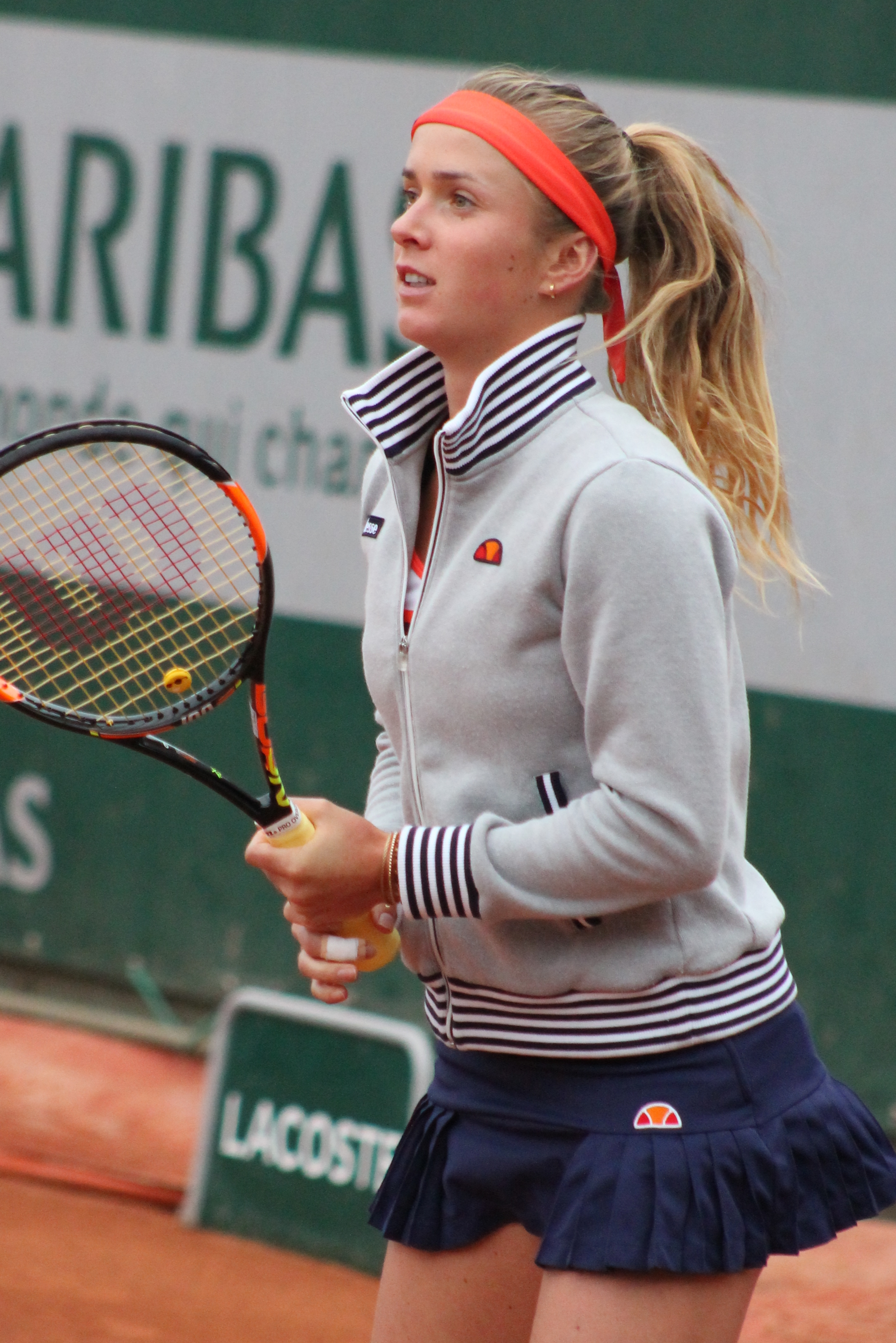
Svitolina at the 2015 French Open

She began the new season at the Brisbane International where she reached the semifinals before losing to eventual champion Maria Sharapova. At the Australian Open, Svitolina reached the third round, and won the first set against world No. 1 and eventual champion, Serena Williams, before losing in three sets. She fell in the second round in both Dubai and Doha, losing in tight three-set matches to Petra Kvitová and Victoria Azarenka, respectively.

As the 23rd seed in Indian Wells, she defeated Alison Van Uytvanck and Lucie Šafářová, before losing in the fourth round to Timea Bacsinszky. The following week in Miami, she defeated Bojana Jovanovski before losing in the third round to the eighth seed Ekaterina Makarova. As the top seed at a tournament for the first time in Bogotá, Svitolina reached the semifinals, defeating Louisa Chirico, Danka Kovinić and Irina Falconi, before losing to eventual champion Teliana Pereira.

She continued her successful start to the clay-court season by winning her third career title and first on clay in Marrakech, recovering from 2–5 down in the opening set to defeat Tímea Babos, in straight sets. The victory propelled her to a career high ranking of 21. She also reached the semifinals in doubles with compatriot Olga Savchuk. The following week in Madrid, after easily dispatching Daniela Hantuchová, Svitolina lost to Ana Ivanovic for the sixth time in her career. A similar scenario occurred in Rome, where she defeated Flavia Pennetta in straight sets before losing to Venus Williams.

At the French Open, after comfortably seeing off Yanina Wickmayer in her opening match, Svitolina had to recover from 0–3 in the second set and 1–4 in the final set to beat Yulia Putintseva in a match that lasted over three hours. Another tight three-set victory ensued in the third round against Annika Beck, before Svitolina defeated Alizé Cornet in a rain-interrupted fourth-round encounter to set up a maiden Grand Slam quarterfinal against seventh seed Ana Ivanovic, which she lost in straight sets. Svitolina rose to No. 17 after this tournament, surpassing Alona Bondarenko as the highest-ranked Ukrainian woman in the Open Era, including women from Ukraine who played under the Soviet Union.

Svitolina's grass-court season was significantly less successful, losing in three sets in the second round of Eastbourne to Heather Watson. As the 17th seed at Wimbledon, she came from a set down to beat Misaki Doi, who had beaten her at the same stage the previous year, before again losing in the second round to Australian Casey Dellacqua. Despite losing in the first round of İstanbul to Magdaléna Rybáriková, Svitolina successfully defended her doubles title from the previous year, this time partnering Daria Gavrilova.

She began U.S. hardcourt season with a run to the semifinals in Stanford, losing in straight sets to eventual champion Angelique Kerber. At the Rogers Cup, Svitolina lost in the first round to Victoria Azarenka. She bettered her performance from the previous year in Cincinnati, defeating Alison Riske, Eugenie Bouchard and Caroline Garcia to reach the quarterfinals, before defeating Lucie Šafářová for the second time this year to progress to her second Premier-5 semifinal, where she lost to Serena Williams. Svitolina concluded her warm up for the US Open in New Haven, where she retired from her first-round match against Madison Keys. She progressed to the third round of the US Open, defeating Elizaveta Kulichkova and Kaia Kanepi, before losing to 13th seed Ekaterina Makarova for the third time this year.

The Asian hardcourt swing began in Tokyo for Svitolina, where she lost in the second round to eventual champion Agnieszka Radwańska. Svitolina failed to repeat her success from the previous year in Wuhan, losing in the third round to Karolína Plíšková. Similarly disappointing results ensued for Svitolina, losing in the second round of Beijing to Anastasia Pavlyuchenkova, and the first round of Tianjin to Elena Vesnina.

Despite this disappointing end to her season, Svitolina's consistency throughout the year earned her a spot as the eighth seed at the inaugural WTA Elite Trophy in Zhuhai. She was drawn into Group B with second seed Carla Suárez Navarro and Andrea Petkovic. Svitolina topped the group by winning both her matches, advancing to the semifinals where she lost to Karolína Plíšková. Her last match of the season was against Pauline Parmentier in the first round of the WTA 125 tournament in Limoges, which she lost on a final-set tiebreak.

=== 2016: Olympic quarterfinal ===
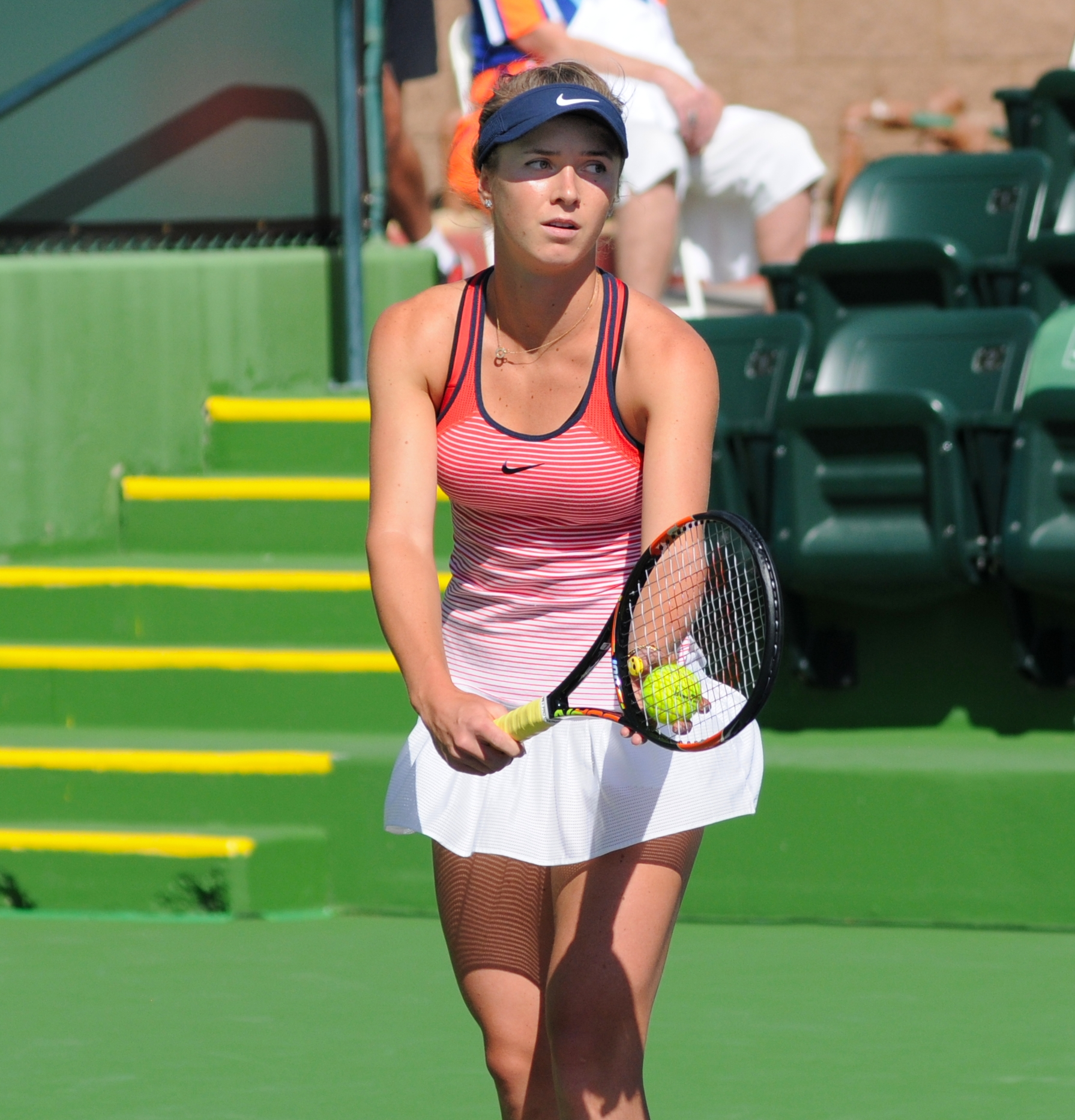
Svitolina at the 2016 Indian Wells Open

Svitolina began her season at the Hopman Cup, representing Ukraine with Alexandr Dolgopolov. She was undefeated in her singles matches in the round-robin stage, defeating Victoria Duval, Karolína Plíšková, and Jarmila Wolfe. Svitolina and Dolgopolov were the winners of their group, and advanced to the final, where the Australian pairing of Nick Kyrgios and Daria Gavrilova defeated them 2–0, with Svitolina losing her singles match in straight sets. At the Sydney International, Svitolina lost in the first round to Angelique Kerber. In Melbourne, she defeated Victoria Duval in straight sets, before losing to qualifier Naomi Osaka in the second round.

In her first tournament with Justine Henin acting as a coaching consultant, Svitolina advanced to the semifinals in Dubai, defeating qualifier Jana Čepelová, earning her first top-10 win of the year over second seed Garbiñe Muguruza, and battling past CoCo Vandeweghe in three sets, before losing to eventual champion Sara Errani. Svitolina subsequently lost in the first round in Doha to Denisa Allertová.

Her next tournament was the Malaysian Open where she defeated Miyu Kato, Risa Ozaki, Kristína Kučová, and Zhu Lin en route to the final where she beat a resurgent Eugenie Bouchard in a rain-interrupted marathon to win her fourth WTA Tour title. This victory saw her maintain her perfect record in WTA finals, as well as improving her ranking to a career high of 14.

At the Indian Wells Open, 17th-seed Svitolina defeated Annika Beck, before losing in straight sets to ninth-seed Roberta Vinci. Then, in Miami, after defeating Australian Open quarterfinalist Zhang Shuai, Svitolina scored one of the biggest victories of her career, coming from a break down in the third set to defeat former WTA No. 1, Caroline Wozniacki, in three sets in the third round. Svitolina subsequently lost in the fourth round to Ekaterina Makarova, who beat her at the same tournament the prior year.

Svitolina began her clay-court season with a disappointing first-round loss to Alexandra Panova in Bogotá, followed by a second-round loss to Daria Gavrilova in Madrid, and a first-round loss to qualifier Monica Puig in Rome. Entering the French Open in poor form, Svitolina beat Romanian qualifier Sorana Cîrstea and wildcard Taylor Townsend before beating nemesis and former world No. 1, Ana Ivanovic, in straight sets. She then lost in the fourth round to world No. 1, defending champion, and eventual finalist Serena Williams.

In Birmingham, she lost in the first round to Carla Suárez Navarro. At Wimbledon, she beat Naomi Broady in straight sets before being upset by Yaroslava Shvedova.

At the Rio Olympics, Svitolina scored her first win over defending champion and then-world No. 1, Serena Williams, in the third round to reach the quarterfinals, defeating the out-of-sorts American in straight sets. Svitolina failed to follow up her landmark victory in the next round, however, losing to eventual bronze medalist Petra Kvitová.

American hardcourt season began with a run to the third round of Montréal, losing to Angelique Kerber. After a disappointing early loss to Daria Gavrilova in Cincinnati, she rebounded at New Haven, reaching the final before losing to Agnieszka Radwańska. At the US Open, Svitolina reached the third round for the second consecutive year with wins over Mandy Minella and Lauren Davis, but she lost to Petra Kvitová once again.

The Asian swing proved to be fruitful for Svitolina, reaching the semifinals of both Tokyo, where she was defeated by Naomi Osaka, and Beijing, her first semifinal at Premier-Mandatory level, losing to eventual champion Agnieszka Radwańska. As a result, her ranking was propelled back up to 15, one place shy of her career high, and guaranteed her a place in Zhuhai for the second year running. Her good form continued at the last Premier event of the season in Moscow, where she reached the semifinals, her third in four tournaments, before bowing out to eventual champion Svetlana Kuznetsova.

Svitolina concluded her season as the fourth seed in Zhuhai. She topped her group by defeating Kiki Bertens and Elena Vesnina, and then came from a set down to defeat top seed Johanna Konta in the semifinals to advance to her third final of the year, where she lost to Kvitová. Svitolina finished the season ranked 14th, with an impressive 13–5 win–loss record following the US Open.

=== 2017: Three Premier 5 titles, No. 3 ===
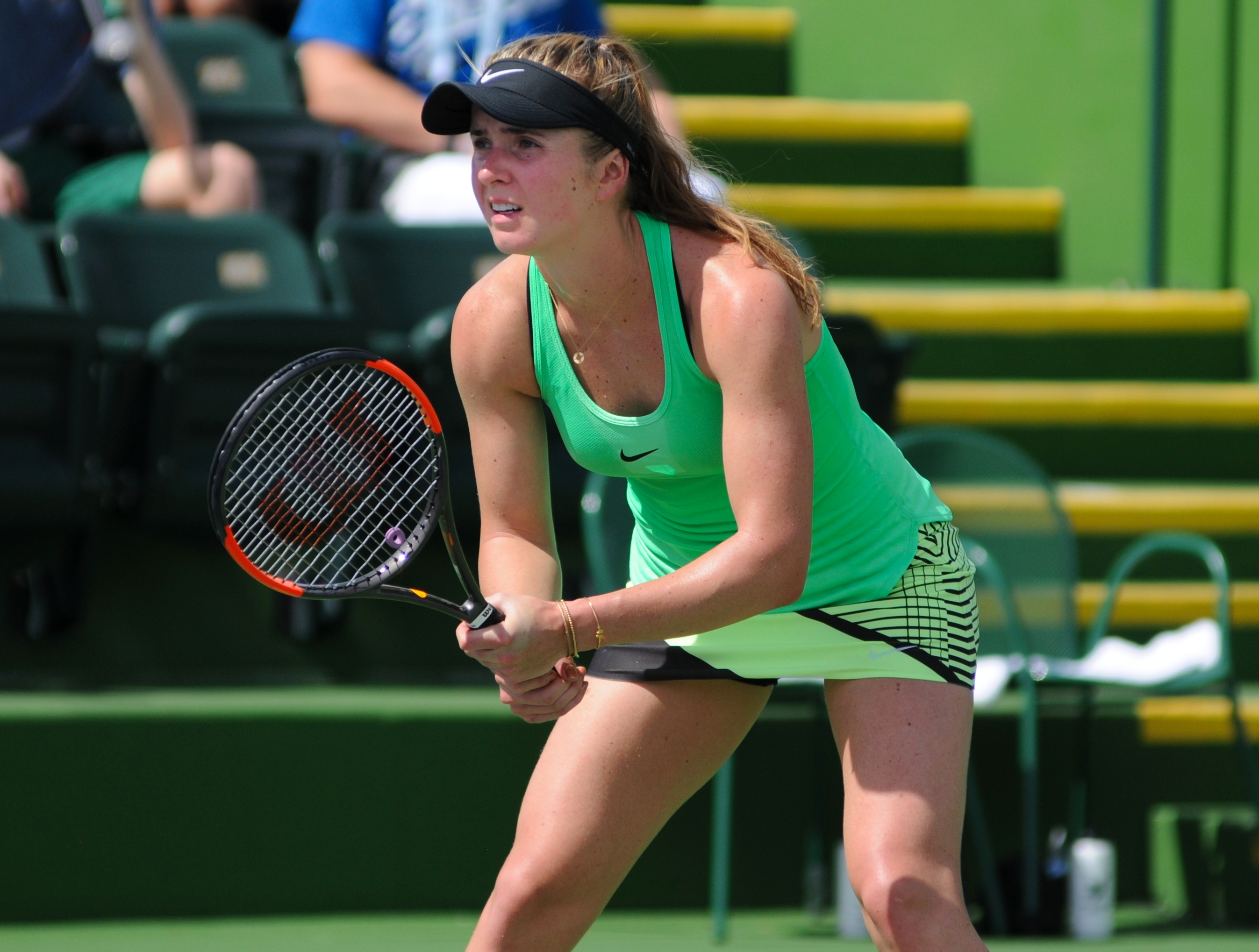
Svitolina at the 2017 Indian Wells Open

Svitolina began her 2017 season with a strong showing in Brisbane, defeating world No. 1, Angelique Kerber, in the quarterfinals, before losing to eventual champion Karolína Plíšková in the following round. The victory over Kerber signified her third win over a number-one-ranked player in five months. Svitolina was seeded 11th at the Australian Open, her highest seeding to date. She equalled her best showing in Melbourne, reaching the third round with victories over Galina Voskoboeva and Julia Boserup, before losing to Anastasia Pavlyuchenkova.

Svitolina won her fifth career title at the Taiwan Open, fending off four match points in her quarterfinal encounter with Ons Jabeur, before defeating Peng Shuai in the final. Svitolina next competed in Ukraine's Fed Cup tie against Australia, where she won both of her singles rubbers to help Ukraine set up a play-off against Germany. Svitolina continued her strong start to the season in Dubai, where she defeated Caroline Wozniacki in straight sets in the final to capture her first title at Premier 5-level. This win propelled her into the WTA top 10 for the first time in her career, making her the first Ukrainian ever to do so. Svitolina failed to carry her momentum into the American hard-court swing, losing in the fourth round of Indian Wells to Garbiñe Muguruza, and the second round of Miami to Bethanie Mattek-Sands.

She began the clay-court season by capturing her third title of the year in İstanbul. Rebounding from a disappointing loss to Zheng Saisai in the first round of Madrid, Svitolina then proceeded to reach her second Premier-5-level final of the year, and fourth overall, in Rome. After defeating two top-5 players en route in Karolína Plíšková and Garbiñe Muguruza, she faced off against Simona Halep, whom she defeated in three sets to claim the title. The win propelled her to a career high of No. 6 in the singles rankings, as well as to the top spot in the Race to Singapore. She then started her campaign at the French Open as one of the favourites to win the tournament. Svitolina progressed through her first three matches with relative ease, defeating Yaroslava Shvedova, Tsvetana Pironkova and Magda Linette respectively. Svitolina then overcame qualifier Petra Martić in a tight three set encounter to advance to her second major quarterfinal. She faced Simona Halep in a rematch of the Italian Open final. Svitolina led by a set and 5–1 and held a match point against the 2014 finalist, but lost in three sets (the third set at love).

At Wimbledon, she surpassed her previous performances by reaching the fourth round, defeating Birmingham finalist and potential dark horse Ashleigh Barty in the first round. She then eased past Francesca Schiavone and Carina Witthöft, before bowing out to 13th seed and French Open champion Jeļena Ostapenko in straight sets.

Her fifth title of the year, and third successive at Premier 5-level, came in Toronto, where she defeated four top-10 players en route in Venus Williams, Garbiñe Muguruza, Simona Halep and Caroline Wozniacki. Svitolina's first loss of the season at Premier-5-level came the following week in the third round of Cincinnati, losing to Julia Görges.

She entered the US Open knowing that a run to the semifinals would see her claim the world-number-one ranking for the first time. She overcame Kateřina Siniaková in a rain-interrupted three-set encounter, before easing past Evgeniya Rodina and Shelby Rogers to reach the round of 16 at the US Open for the first time. She was then defeated by eventual runner-up Madison Keys in three sets.

Despite missing a large part of the Asian swing, Svitolina still secured her place at the year-end WTA Finals in Singapore, making her the first Ukrainian ever to do so. As the third seed in Beijing, she progressed to her eighth quarterfinal of the year with relative ease, defeating wildcard Zhu Lin, recent Wuhan finalist Ashleigh Barty and Elena Vesnina. There, she was defeated by Caroline Garcia on a final-set tiebreak.

Svitolina was drawn into the Red Group at the WTA Finals, alongside Halep, Wozniacki and Caroline Garcia. Despite earning her fifth career win over a number-one-ranked player by defeating Halep, Svitolina lost her other two matches, including a two-set drubbing by eventual champion Wozniacki, which ultimately placed her third in the group. She finished the year ranked at No. 6.

=== 2018: WTA Finals champion ===
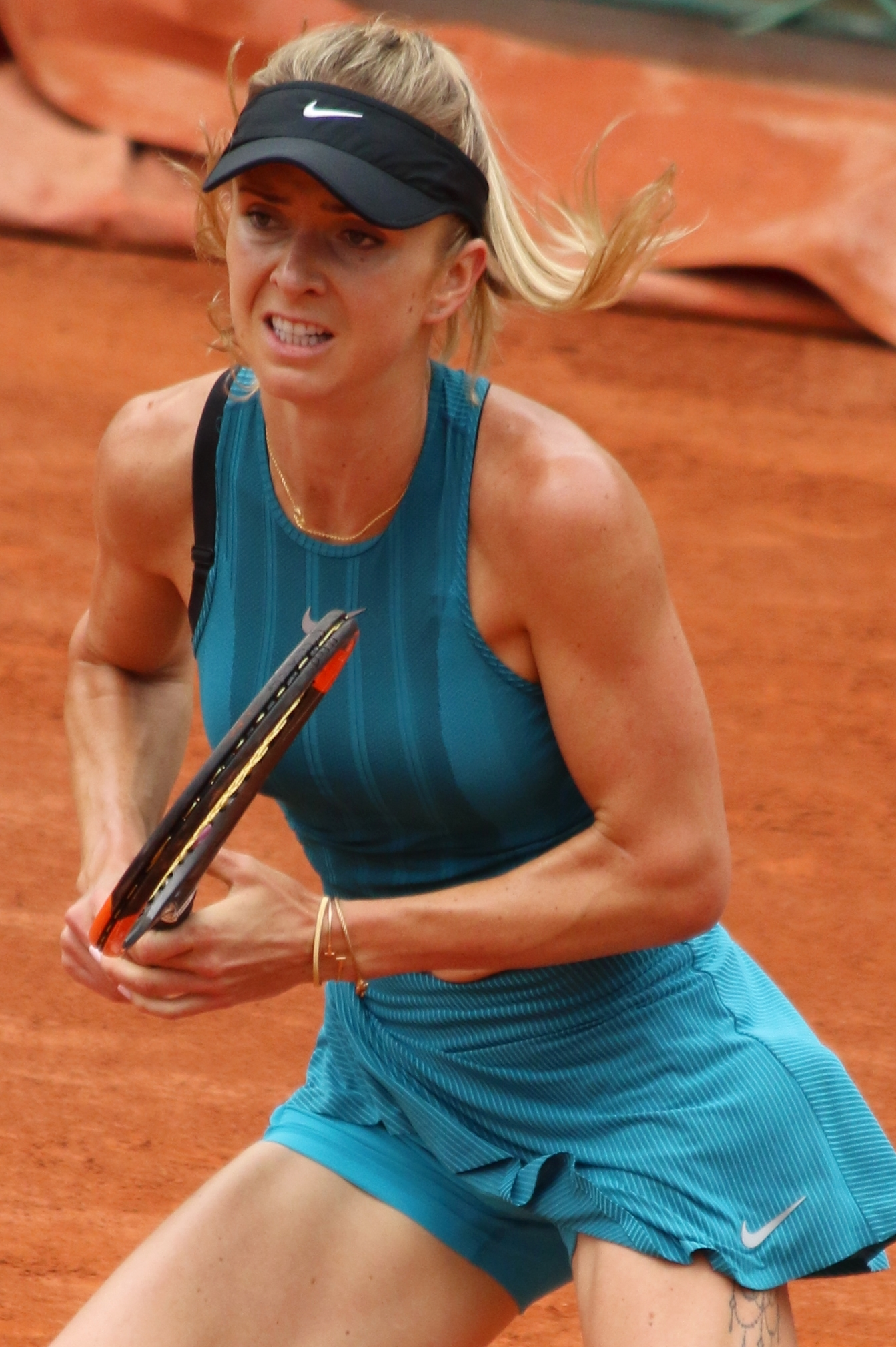
Svitolina at the 2018 French Open

Svitolina began her 2018 season by capturing the Brisbane International title, defeating qualifier Aliaksandra Sasnovich in the final. She then competed at the Australian Open as the fourth seed, faced qualifier Ivana Jorović and won in straight sets. Against Kateřina Siniaková, Svitolina prevailed in three sets. She then had two straight-sets wins over qualifier and compatriot Marta Kostyuk and Denisa Allertová to advance to her first Australian Open quarterfinal where she was upset by Elise Mertens in straight sets.

Svitolina's 11th career title came after a successful defence of her crown in Dubai, where she brushed aside Daria Kasatkina in the final. After losing to Carla Suárez Navarro in the third round of Indian Wells, she produced her best ever result in Miami, reaching the quarterfinals before falling to eventual runner-up Jeļena Ostapenko in straight sets.

Rebounding from a second-round loss in Madrid to Suárez Navarro, Svitolina claimed her second straight Italian Open crown, defeating top seed Simona Halep in two sets, in a rematch of the previous year's final. At the French Open, Svitolina posted wins against Ajla Tomljanović and Viktória Kužmová, before being upset in the third round by Mihaela Buzărnescu.

She began her grass-court season with a run to the quarterfinals of Birmingham, losing again to Buzărnescu. Svitolina was then upset in the first round of Wimbledon by recent Mallorca champion Tatjana Maria.

She enjoyed moderate success during the US Open Series, reaching the semifinals in Montreal, where she was the defending champion, and the quarterfinals of Cincinnati, losing there to eventual champion Kiki Bertens. She reached the round of 16 at the US Open for the second straight year, losing to Anastasija Sevastova in three sets.

Svitolina's struggles with form continued into the Asian swing, with back-to-back opening round losses to eventual champion Aryna Sabalenka in Wuhan, and Aleksandra Krunić in Beijing, despite opening up a 6–0, 3–0 lead in the latter match. A quarterfinal defeat in Hong Kong to in-form Wang Qiang, coupled with Svitolina's decision not to play in the final week of the year at either Moscow or Luxembourg City, meant that qualification for the WTA Finals in Singapore would rest on the performances of Karolína Plíšková and Kiki Bertens in Moscow. Plíšková's defeat in the second round ensured that Svitolina would qualify for Singapore for the second successive year.

As the sixth seed, she was drawn into the White Group, alongside defending champion Caroline Wozniacki, and Czechs Plíšková and Petra Kvitová. She won all three of her round-robin matches, first snapping a seven-match losing streak against Kvitová, defeating her in straight sets. She then defeated both Plíšková and Wozniacki in three sets to secure her place in the semifinals alongside Plíšková. She defeated Kiki Bertens in three sets, and in the final, she came from a set down to beat Sloane Stephens, winning the biggest title of her career. Svitolina ended the year as the world No. 4.

=== 2019: Two major semifinals ===
Svitolina opened the season with an unsuccessful title defense in Brisbane; she lost her first match to the previous year's finalist, Aliaksandra Sasnovich.

Seeded sixth at the Australian Open, she defeated qualifier Viktorija Golubic, Viktória Kužmová, Zhang Shuai, and 17th seed Madison Keys to make her second consecutive quarterfinal at the Australian Open. She was, however, afflicted by a neck and shoulder injury and was defeated by fourth seed and eventual champion Naomi Osaka in straight sets. Svitolina then reached back-to-back semifinals in Doha, losing with the lead in the final set against Simona Halep, and Dubai, where she was the two-time defending champion, losing in a third-set tiebreak to eventual champion Belinda Bencic.

Svitolina reached her third consecutive semifinal of the year at Indian Wells. In her first Premier Mandatory semifinal since 2016, she lost in three sets to 18-year-old wildcard and eventual champion Bianca Andreescu. The next week at the Miami Open, she suffered a surprise defeat in her opening match against Wang Yafan. Svitolina later revealed that she had been struggling with knee pain for several weeks and announced she would take a short break to recover.

Svitolina's clay-court season began with back-to-back opening round losses to Pauline Parmentier in Madrid and to Victoria Azarenka in Rome, where she was the two-time defending champion and had held a match point leading in the final set. At the French Open, Svitolina was defeated in the third round by the 2016 champion, Garbiñe Muguruza.

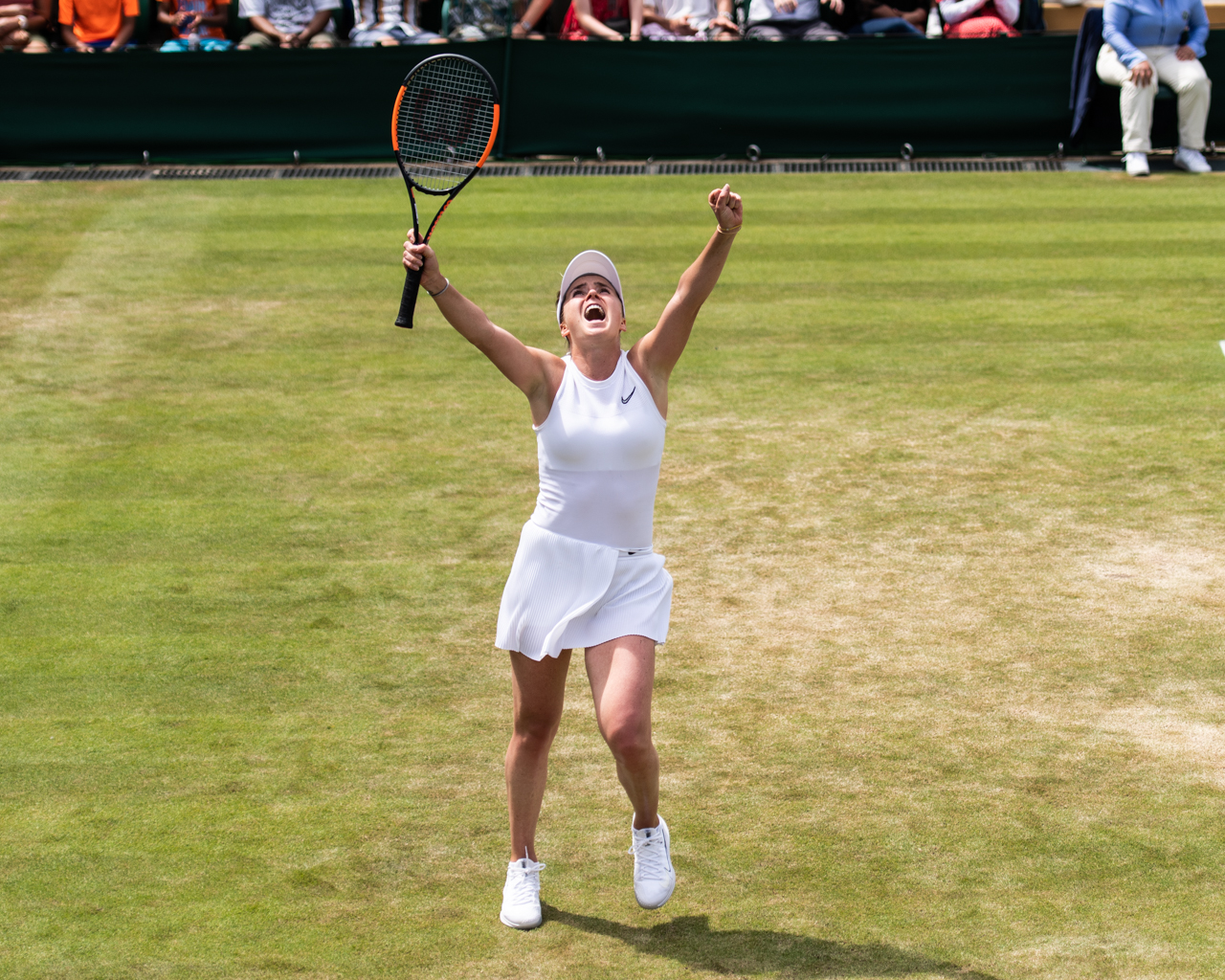
Svitolina at the 2019 Wimbledon Championships

After losing in her opening round at both Birmingham and Eastbourne, Svitolina proceeded to reach her first Grand Slam semifinal at Wimbledon with victories over Daria Gavrilova, Margarita Gasparyan, Maria Sakkari, Petra Martić and Karolína Muchová, becoming the first Ukrainian ever to do so. There, she faced eventual champion Simona Halep and was defeated in two sets.

The North American hardcourt season began for Svitolina at San Jose, where as the top seed, she fell to Maria Sakkari in the quarterfinals. She would then fall to Sofia Kenin in both the quarterfinals of Toronto and the round of 16 at Cincinnati. Entering the US Open as the No. 5 seed, Svitolina defeated Whitney Osuigwe, Venus Williams, Dayana Yastremska and Madison Keys to reach her first US Open quarterfinal. There, she defeated Johanna Konta in straight sets for a spot in her second successive Grand Slam semifinal. She was then defeated in straight sets by Serena Williams. She subsequently returned to her career-high ranking position of No. 3.

Svitolina reached three consecutive quarterfinals in the season-closing Asian swing, losing to Kristina Mladenovic in Zhengzhou, eventual runner-up Alison Riske in Wuhan, and Kiki Bertens in Beijing. Despite failing to reach a final during the season, Svitolina's overall consistency managed to secure her spot as the eighth seed at the WTA Finals in Shenzhen for the third successive year. She was drawn into the Purple Group alongside Karolína Plíšková, US Open champion Bianca Andreescu, who was later replaced by Sofia Kenin, and Wimbledon champion Simona Halep. Svitolina topped her group, winning all three matches without dropping a set. Her semifinal match against Belinda Bencic was cut short when Bencic retired with a leg injury down 4–1 in the final set, meaning that Svitolina would advance to the final for the second year in succession, as well as her first final since winning the title in 2018. She failed to defend her title, however, losing in straight sets to Ashleigh Barty. This meant Svitolina failed to win a title during the year for the first time since 2012.

=== 2020: Two titles, top 5 ===
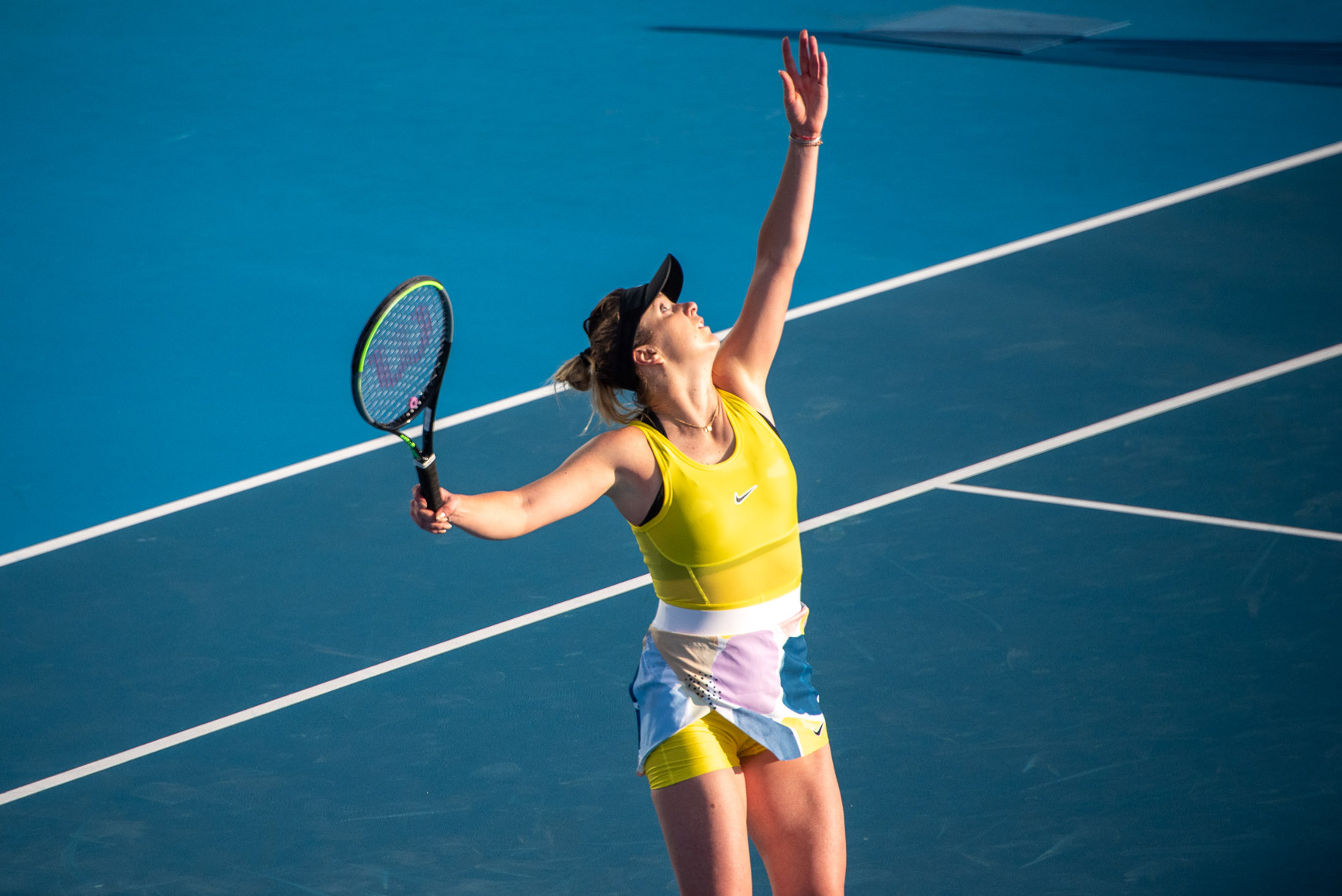
Svitolina at the 2020 Australian Open

At her first tournament of the year in Brisbane, Svitolina lost in the first round to Danielle Collins in straight sets. At the Australian Open, Svitolina defeated Katie Boulter and Lauren Davis, before falling to eventual runner-up Garbiñe Muguruza. Svitolina's slow start to the season continued, being upset in the quarterfinals of Hua Hin by Nao Hibino, and in the first round of both Dubai by Jennifer Brady, and Doha by Amanda Anisimova. She rebounded at the Monterrey Open, where she easily reached the final without dropping a set. She then defeated Marie Bouzková in the final in three sets, capturing her 14th singles title, and her first since her WTA Finals win over 16 months ago.

Following the suspension of the WTA Tour due to the COVID-19 pandemic, Svitolina declined to participate in the US Open due to safety concerns. Her first tournament back was the Italian Open and defeated Anastasia Pavlyuchenkova and Svetlana Kuznetsova to reach the quarterfinals, where she lost to Markéta Vondroušová, winning just three games. She next participated at Strasbourg, where she defeated Magda Linette, Jil Teichmann, and Aryna Sabalenka to reach the final. There, she won her 15th WTA singles title, defeating Elena Rybakina in three tight sets. At the French Open, where she was the third seed, Svitolina defeated Varvara Gracheva, Renata Zarazúa, Ekaterina Alexandrova, and Caroline Garcia to reach the quarterfinals. At this stage, she was upset by qualifier and world No. 130, Nadia Podoroska. Her final tournament of the season was at the inaugural event in Ostrava, where, in receipt of a first-round bye, she was defeated by Maria Sakkari in straight sets in the second round. She ended her season at Ostrava, and ended the year ranked No. 5.

=== 2021: Olympic bronze medal ===
Svitolina began her year as the second seed at the Abu Dhabi Open and made it to the quarterfinals, where she lost to unseeded Veronika Kudermetova after a third set tiebreak, during which she could not recover from a 3–0 gap at the start. Following the loss, she embarked on her first tournament of the Australian hardcourt swing at the inaugural Gippsland Trophy in Melbourne, where she entered as the third seed. After holding off Andrea Petkovic and Jeļena Ostapenko, she was confronted by Elise Mertens and lost after her second consecutive third set tiebreak at the tournament. Next, Svitolina began the Australian Open as the fifth seed and made it to the fourth round, before she was shocked by unseeded Jessica Pegula in another three-set match, one that she recapped as "where nothing was going my way." The loss gave Pegula her first victory over a top 10 player, but Svitolina her sixth defeat to a player ranked outside the top 30 at a major event since she had become ranked within the top 10 since May 2017.

In March, Svitolina began the year's Middle Eastern hardcourt swing that ended with consecutive disappointments. She first entered the Qatar Ladies Open as the top seed but was defeated by an injured Victoria Azarenka in her second match of the tournament. The following week, she entered the Dubai Championships as the first seed once more, but she was quickly forced out just after her first match following a loss to Svetlana Kuznetsova, in three sets. Later that month, she turned her fortunes around at the Miami Open, after she reached the semifinals for the first time in her seventh appearance at the tournament. She was defeated by eventual champion, Ash Barty, in straight sets.

Svitolina kicked off the year's Europe clay swing at the Stuttgart Open with a strong performance after making it to the semifinals following a grueling three-set win over defending champion, Petra Kvitová, in the quarterfinals. The win set her up for her second semifinal match of the year against Ashleigh Barty, where she eventually came up short again in another three-set match. The defeat marked her third consecutive loss to Barty in their head-to-head record. Svitolina experienced much less success at the Madrid Open, after being upset in the first round by Jil Teichmann, but she shrugged the loss off quickly as she made it into the quarterfinals of the Italian Open the following week. There, she was defeated by eventual champion Iga Świątek, in straight sets. The swing ended at the French Open, where fifth-seeded Svitolina lost in the third round to eventual champion, Barbora Krejčíková, in straight sets. Despite the losses, Svitolina credited her investment in online psychology courses with helping her cope with the chaotic nature of being on tour during the clay-court swing amid the pandemic.

For the grass swing, second-seeded Svitolina attended her first tournament at the German Open in Berlin and had a rough start after she was ousted in her first match there; her loss to Ekaterina Alexandrova, in straight sets, marked her first loss to the Russian in their four-match head-to-head record. Her woes followed her to the Eastbourne International the following week, where she was defeated in the second round by unseeded Elena Rybakina, in straight sets. The swing culminated with Wimbledon, where the defending semifinalist finished a disappointing grass-court swing with a straight-set loss to unseeded Magda Linette, in just the second round. Her elimination marked the biggest upset of the year's tournament at the time.

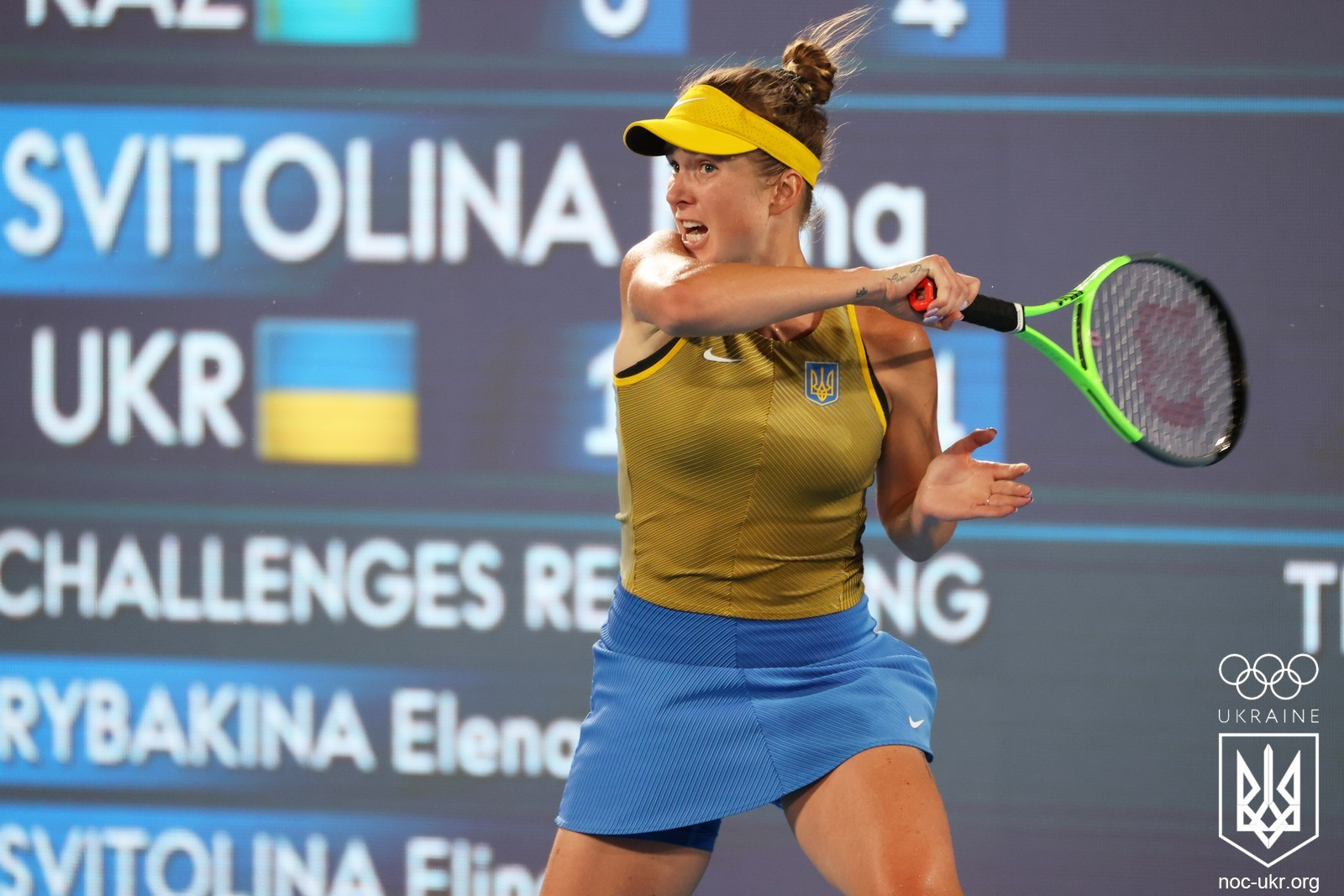
Svitolina in the bronze medal match at the 2020 Summer Olympics

At the 2020 Summer Olympics in Tokyo, Svitolina embarked on her second Olympics appearance and entered into the singles tennis tournament as the fourth seed. This would be her second bid to earn her home country its very first medal in tennis in Olympics history. After defeating Camila Giorgi in the quarterfinals, she was stopped from reaching the gold medal match by Markéta Vondroušová in the semifinals when she lost in straight sets. Disappointed from losing the semifinals but unfazed, she faced off against Elena Rybakina in the bronze medal match in a rematch since their encounter in Eastbourne. This time, Svitolina exacted revenge and came back from a set down to win the second set tiebreak and the decider. Speaking on the significance of the victory after winning the bronze medal, Svitolina exclaimed, "To win such a big battle for the bronze, it means the world for me. Everyone in Ukraine is watching, we don't win so many medals, it's very special for me and Ukraine."

I want to be remembered as a fighter for my country. I want to win everything that I play and I always try to do my best and be at my best for Ukraine.

— Svitolina, speaking about the Olympics

Coming off of her win in Tokyo, Svitolina hoped to continue her streak of success in the beginning of the North American hardcourt swing during the year's US Open Series, but she quickly failed to materialize crucial wins in the first two tournaments of the swing. At the Canadian Open, third-seeded Svitolina was defeated in her first match by Johanna Konta in a three-set loss, despite having won the first set. The loss marked her first in their six-match head-to-head record. The following week, at the Cincinnati Open, fourth-seeded Svitolina was again ousted in her first match, this time against Angelique Kerber in another three-set loss. After her disappointing early exits, Svitolina traveled to Michigan for the inaugural Chicago Open as the top seed, where she won her 16th WTA title after defeating Alizé Cornet in the final match, in straight sets. Regarding her decision to play in Chicago, Svitolina said, "I came here to get some confidence, play some good matches, and in the end it happened like that. I'm looking forward to New York."

At the US Open, fifth-seeded Svitolina began her campaign with straight-sets wins over Rebecca Marino and Rebeka Masarova in the first and second round, respectively. She followed those victories with two additional straight-set wins over 25th seed Daria Kasatkina and 12th seed Simona Halep to reach her second US Open quarterfinal. But in the quarterfinals, Svitolina was toppled by unseeded 19-year-old Leylah Fernandez in a thriller three-setter that saw Svitolina take the second set and come back from three games down in the decider to take the set to a tiebreak. Svitolina ultimately became the third of four seeded players that Fernandez defeated while on her winning streak to reach her first Grand Slam final.

A few weeks later, in a bid to replicate the success she experienced in Chicago just a few weeks prior, Svitolina entered into the inaugural Chicago Fall Tennis Classic as the top seed, but she lost to sixth seed and eventual finalist Ons Jabeur in straight sets in the quarterfinals. The loss was her first to Jabeur in their four encounters. At Indian Wells, the defending semifinalist entered as the fourth seed and fought off Sorana Cîrstea in the third round in a three-set match, where she was down by a break in the deciding set, before she was swiftly ousted by Pegula in the fourth round in a straight-sets breadstick defeat. Following the loss, she explained to the press that she had been suffering from a muscle strain in her right leg during the tournament, which prevented her from practicing regularly and severely hampered her movement during her final match. Her season-end struggles continued after a first-round defeat by Camila Osorio at the Tenerife Ladies Open, despite being the top seed. For the first time in four years, she ended the year outside of the top 10, ranked at No. 15.

=== 2022: Pregnancy, hiatus and fundraising for Ukraine ===
Svitolina's disappointing beginning to her season consisted of back-to-back losses at the Adelaide International 1 (to Anastasia Gasanova) and 2 (to Madison Keys). She then jumpstarted her first major campaign of the year as the 15th seed at the Australian Open with two consecutive wins over Fiona Ferro and Harmony Tan before she quickly succumbed to Victoria Azarenka, after winning just two games in their third-round encounter. Of her eight remaining matches of the season, Svitolina managed to win just three, with two being in Monterrey that led to her only quarterfinal of the year, where she lost to Camila Osorio.

Following the 2022 Russian invasion of Ukraine in February, Svitolina made headlines when she declared she would not play against anyone representing Russia or Belarus, after she was placed against Russian player Anastasia Potapova in the first round of the Monterrey draw, and she and her compatriots demanded that the tennis governing bodies deem any Russian or Belarusian player to be neutral athletes during the war. Her concerns were later heeded.

On 31 March 2022, Svitolina announced that she was taking a temporary break from competition, citing health problems, including back pain, and emotional exhaustion from the Russian invasion of Ukraine. In May, she later announced that she was pregnant with her first child, after which she gave birth in October.

Throughout her hiatus, Svitolina took on an active role in charity exhibitions and galas to raise awareness and money in support of Ukraine. In July, she joined Iga Świątek and Agnieszka Radwańska for an exhibition in Kraków in which she was the chair umpire; together, they raised over €400,000 for her eponymous foundation, United24, and UNICEF Polska. In October, she raised over €240,000 for her foundation and United24 in a charity gala in Monaco.

=== 2023: Wimbledon semifinal ===
Joined by new coach Raemon Sluiter, Svitolina made her return to the tour at the Charleston Open in April with a wildcard, where she lost in three sets against Yulia Putintseva. She continued her comeback by entering into two tournaments on the ITF Women's World Tennis Tour, marking her return to the circuit for the first time in ten years. In May, Svitolina won consecutive matches for the first time in the season at the Open de Saint-Malo and reached the semifinals, where she bowed out to eventual champion Sloane Stephens. The newfound momentum led Svitolina to her 17th career WTA title in Strasbourg over Anna Blinkova; it was her second title in Strasbourg, her first title in 21 months, and it extended her perfect streaks in clay court finals to six and WTA 250 finals to ten.

She reached the fourth round at the French Open defeating 26th seed Martina Trevisan, along with comeback wins over qualifier Storm Hunter, and again over Anna Blinkova. She went on to defeat the ninth seed Daria Kasatkina to book her spot in a Grand Slam quarterfinal for the ninth time in her career, her fourth at the French Open and her first at a major since the US Open in 2021. Despite losing to world No. 2 and reigning Australian Open champion, Aryna Sabalenka, in straight sets, Svitolina returned to the top 100 on 12 June 2023.

Her good form continued at Wimbledon where she reached back to back quarterfinals as a wildcard defeating Venus Williams, Elise Mertens, Sofia Kenin and 19th seed Victoria Azarenka. She defeated the world No. 1, Iga Świątek, to make her second Wimbledon semifinal. It was also her fourth win over a major champion. She became the third player in the Open Era to defeat four former major champions in a single Grand Slam tournament after Serena Williams at the 1999 US Open and Justine Henin at Roland Garros in 2005. As a result, she returned to the top 30 rising close to 50 positions up in the rankings.

In July 2023 when Ukrainian four-time individual world sabre champion Olga Kharlan was disqualified at the World Fencing Championships for not shaking the hand of her defeated Russian opponent, though she instead offered a tapping of blades in acknowledgement, Svitolina voiced support for Kharlan. "Why don't Russians respect our position?" she asked. She called on the Fédération Internationale d'Escrime to follow the WTA's lead; it has supported Svitolina's decision to not shake hands with Russians or Belarusians after matches. She said "I think the other sports federations should do the same. They should respect our decision, and the decision of our country as well." Svitolina called the FIE's disqualification "disrespectful" towards Ukrainians.

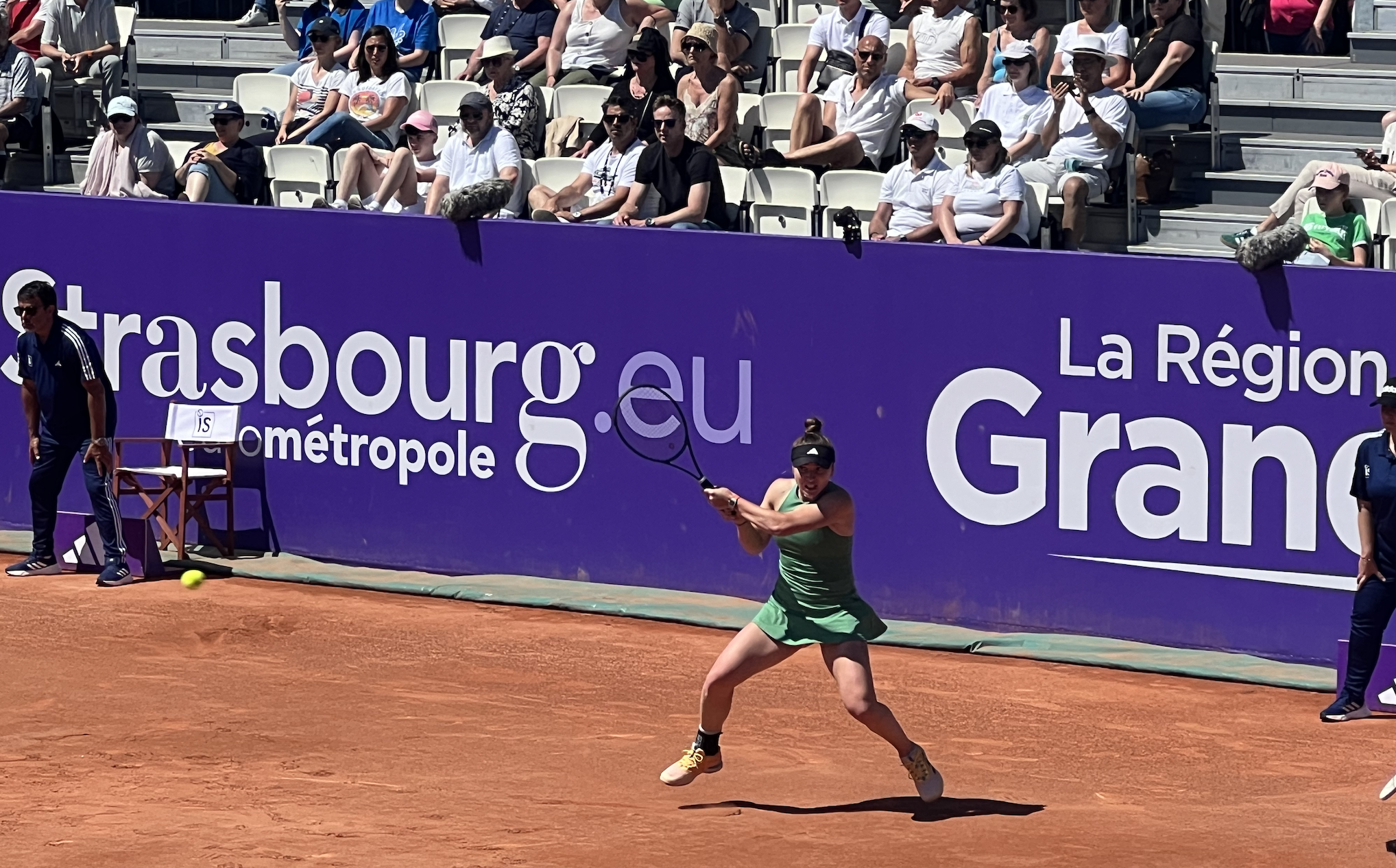
Svitolina hits a backhand in Strasbourg in 2024.

=== 2024–25: Three major quarterfinals ===
At the 2024 Australian Open, Svitolina reached the fourth round, but retired with a back injury in her match against Linda Nosková.

At the 2024 French Open, she advanced to the fourth round, where she lost to Elena Rybakina. Seeded 21st at Wimbledon, she defeated world No. 10, Ons Jabeur, in the third round and Wang Xinyu in round four. In the quarterfinals, she once again lost to Rybakina in straight sets.

Svitolina was a flag bearer for Ukraine at the 2024 Summer Olympics in Paris. As a defending bronze medalist, she upset fifth seed Jessica Pegula in the second round. She lost to reigning Wimbledon champion Barbora Krejčíková in the third round.

Seeded 27th at the 2024 US Open, she lost to defending champion Coco Gauff in the third round. She ended her 2024 season early at the end of September following her withdrawal due to surgery from the China Open.

With her second-round win over Caroline Dolehide at the 2025 Australian Open, Svitolina became the first Ukrainian player, male or female, in the Open Era with 100 main-draw wins at Grand Slam tournaments. She subsequently reached the quarterfinals with wins over fourth seed Jasmine Paolini and former world No. 9, Veronika Kudermetova, for the third time at the tournament. In the quarterfinals, she lost to eventual champion Madison Keys in three sets.

Svitolina had a successful clay season in 2025. She defeated Olga Danilović to win her eighteenth WTA title at the Open de Rouen. Seeded 17th at the Madrid Open, she defeated Sonay Kartal, 10th seed Rybakina, Maria Sakkari, and Moyuka Uchijima to extend her win streak to ten matches. She lost to eventual champion Aryna Sabalenka in the semifinals. She followed that up with a quarterfinal appearance at Rome, losing to Peyton Stearns despite a third set lead. At the French Open, she defeated reigning finalist Paolini in the fourth round to make her second major quarterfinal of the year. There, she lost to three-time defending champion Iga Świątek.

Seeded 14th at Wimbledon, Svitolina lost to Elise Mertens in the third round. She reached the quarterfinals in Canada but lost in the first round of Cincinnati and the US Open. After losing in the semifinals of the Billie Jean King Cup to Jasmine Paolini, Svitolina ended her season early, citing her need to heal and recharge. She finished the year ranked No. 14, her highest finish since her return.

=== 2026: Major semifinalist, WTA 1000 title, top 10 return ===
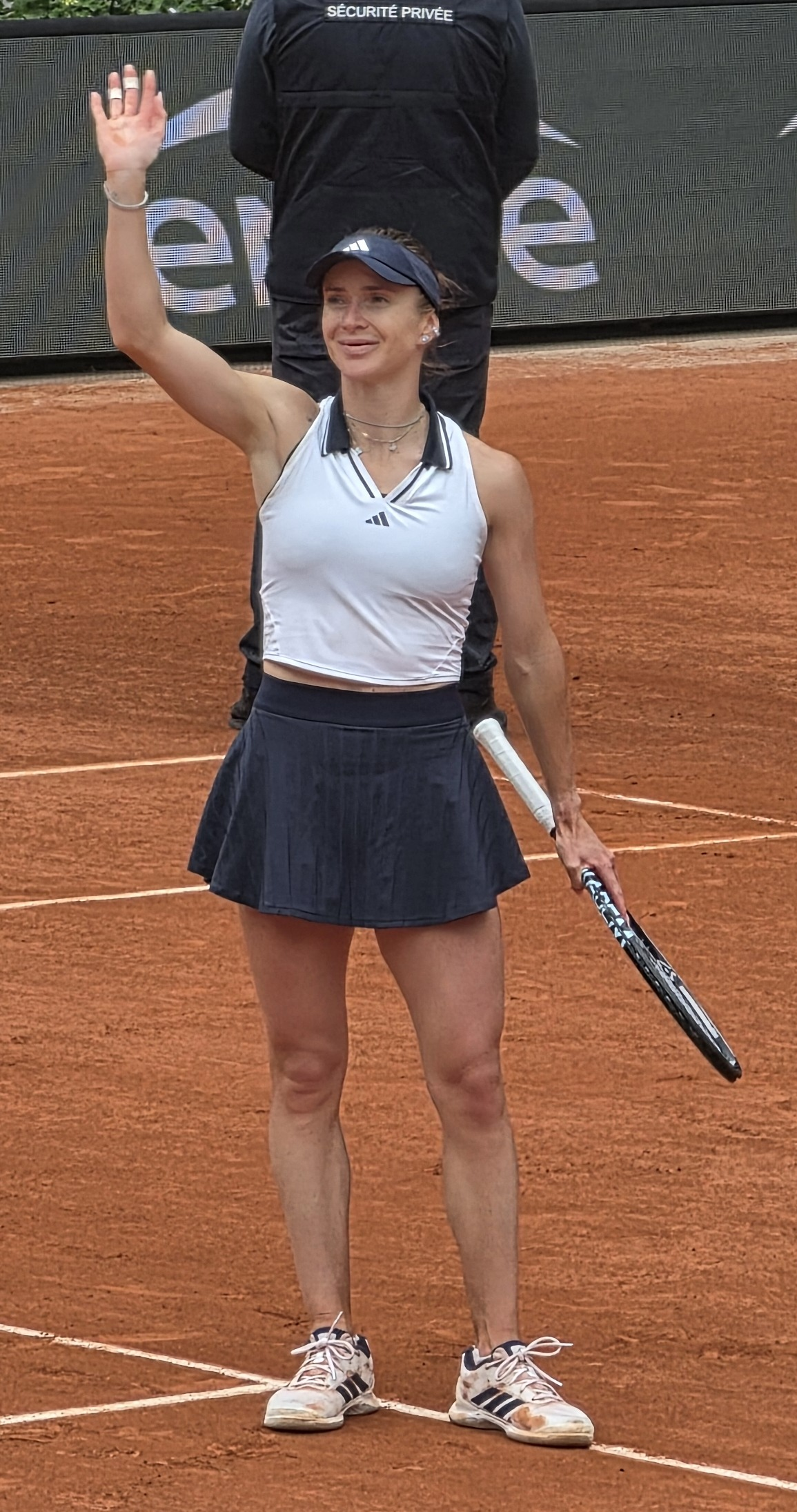
Svitolina at the 2026 French Open

Svitolina began her season by claiming her nineteenth title at Auckland, defeating Wang Xinyu in the final. She reached the quarterfinals of the Australian Open by defeating Cristina Bucșa, Linda Klimovičová, Diana Shnaider, and Mirra Andreeva, making headlines for drawing Xs on camera lenses after defeating Russians Shnaider and Andreeva. In the quarterfinals, she defeated Coco Gauff, advancing to her first Australian Open semifinal and returning to the top 10 for the first time since October 2021. In the semifinals, she lost to Aryna Sabalenka.

She lost in the third round of Doha to Anna Kalinskaya. At Dubai, she defeated Paula Badosa (by retirement), Belinda Bencic, and Antonia Ružić to reach the semifinals. She defeated Coco Gauff in match lasting over three hours to reach her first WTA 1000 final since Rome in 2018, a record gap of over 7 years. In the final, she lost to Jessica Pegula.

At Indian Wells, Svitolina defeated world No. 2, Iga Świątek, to advance to the semifinals, where she lost to Elena Rybakina. She reached another semifinal at Stuttgart, losing to Karolína Muchová.

Later during the clay season, Svitolina reached the final of the Italian Open in Rome, her first final at the event since 2018. In the quarterfinals she upset world No. 2 Rybakina, 2–6, 6–4, 6–4, claiming her 24th career match win in Rome to match Serena Williams for the third-most in tournament history. She then defeated fourth seed Świątek in the semifinals, 6–4, 2–6, 6–2. Svitolina then defeated third seed Gauff in the finals, 6–4, 6–7(3), 6–2 to capture her third Italian Open title, fifth WTA 1000 title, and 20th title overall.

Entering Roland Garros seeded seventh, Svitolina survived another close match against Anna Bondár in the first round. She defeated Kaitlin Quevedo, Tamara Korpatsch, and Belinda Bencic to extend her winning-streak to ten and reach her sixth French Open quarterfinal. However, she lost to fellow Ukrainian and 15th seed Marta Kostyuk, extending Kostyuk's win streak to 17 and dropping Svitolina's quarterfinal record at the event to 0–6.

== Playing style ==
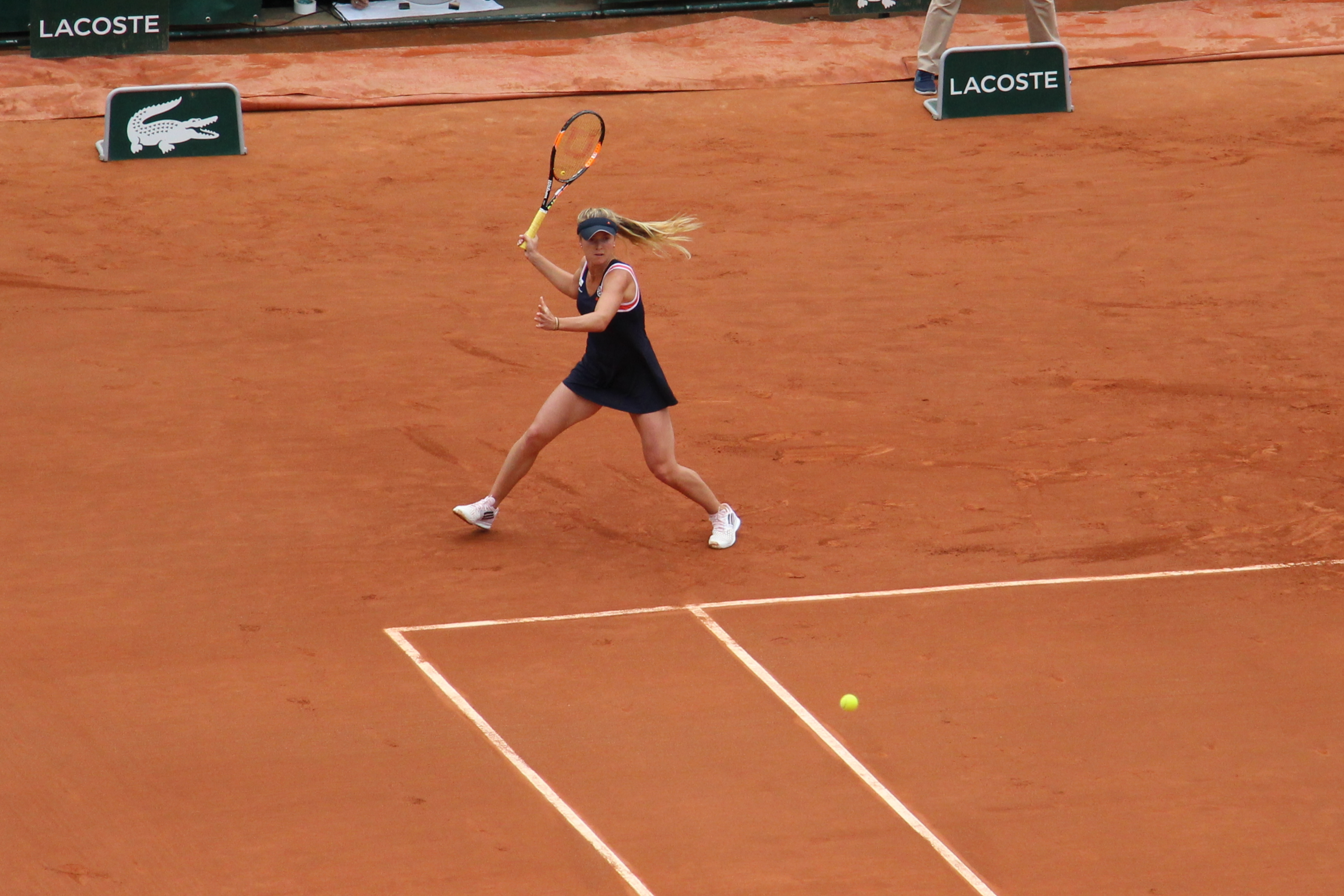
Svitolina returning from the baseline at the 2015 French Open

Svitolina is a defensive baseliner. The Guardian described Svitolina's playing style as "deceptively casual", but being capable of "brilliant displays" when in good form. Svitolina is capable of turning defense into offense when given the chance, and is capable of hitting low-risk winners from defensive positions. Her groundstrokes are very consistent and are hit with moderate power, although she is capable of hitting groundstrokes with significant power when the opportunity arises. Her backhand is her stronger side, especially down the line and on the run, although both her forehand and her backhand penetrate deep into the court. Her second serve is particularly weak and often exploited allowing return winners. She often struggles if playing against someone who is very aggressive and not making many unforced errors on that day. Her first serve speed peaks at 110 mph (175 km/h), allowing her to serve aces. She has been known to struggle with volleying at the net, but she possesses good reactions, and she can accelerate well across the court to deal with short balls. Her favourite surfaces are grass and clay, although she is yet to reach a singles final on grass.

== Coaches ==
Svitolina was coached by Sébastien Mathieu in 2013 and 2014. She then worked with Iain Hughes for two and a half years, and chose to split from him in November 2016. In February 2016, she added former world No. 1 Justine Henin to her coaching team. In late 2016, Svitolina announced that Gabriel Urpí would be her new coach, with Thierry Ascione replacing Henin as her new coaching consultant. Ascione coached Svitolina until the 2018 US Open, and she then had a brief stint with Nick Saviano, whilst still being accompanied on a weekly basis by hitting partner Andrew Bettles. Bettles became her full-time coach for the 2018 season, and former player Marcos Baghdatis began working with her for the 2020 season. Following the end of her 2021 season, Svitolina split with Bettles, announcing her new team would be made of Andis Juška as new coach and Gunter Bresnik as consultant. After her maternity leave hiatus in 2022, Svitolina returned to the tour in April 2023 with Raemon Sluiter. Svitolina announced she had split from Sluiter on 19 July 2024.

== Equipment ==
Svitolina had been endorsed by Nike for clothing and shoes since 2016, having previously been sponsored by Ellesse and Lacoste. In 2023, she began endorsing Adidas clothing and shoes.

Svitolina used Wilson racquets, specifically endorsing the Wilson Blade range of racquets. In 2025 she endorsed the company Diadem Sports, and specifically started playing with their Axis 98 racquet.

== Personal life ==
Svitolina was married to ATP tennis player Gaël Monfils. They began their relationship in 2019, announced their engagement on 3 April 2021, and were married on 16 July 2021. Svitolina did not change her surname professionally with the ITF to Monfils, but she uses "Elina Monfils" on Twitter.

On 15 May 2022, Svitolina and Monfils announced they were expecting their first child together, a girl. She was born later that year. On 19 October 2026, Svitolina announced the end of her marriage to Monfils.

== Career statistics ==
=== Grand Slam singles performance timeline ===
Key
| W | F | SF | QF | #R | RR | Q# | P# | DNQ | A | Z# | PO | G | S | B | NMS | NTI | P | NH |

(W) winner; (F) finalist; (SF) semifinalist; (QF) quarterfinalist; (#R) rounds 4, 3, 2, 1; (RR) round-robin stage; (Q#) qualification round; (P#) preliminary round; (DNQ) did not qualify; (A) absent; (Z#) Davis/Fed Cup Zonal Group (with number indication) or (PO) play-off; (G) gold, (S) silver or (B) bronze Olympic/Paralympic medal; (NMS) not a Masters tournament; (NTI) not a Tier I tournament; (P) postponed; (NH) not held; (SR) strike rate (events won / competed); (W–L) win–loss record.
To avoid confusion and double counting, these charts are updated at the conclusion of a tournament or when the player's participation has ended.

| Tournament | 2011 | 2012 | 2013 | 2014 | 2015 | 2016 | 2017 | 2018 | 2019 | 2020 | 2021 | 2022 | 2023 | 2024 | 2025 | 2026 | SR | W–L | Win % |
|---|---|---|---|---|---|---|---|---|---|---|---|---|---|---|---|---|---|---|---|
| Australian Open | A | A | 1R | 3R | 3R | 2R | 3R | QF | QF | 3R | 4R | 3R | A | 4R | QF | SF | 0 / 13 | 34–13 | 72% |
| French Open | Q1 | Q2 | 2R | 2R | QF | 4R | QF | 3R | 3R | QF | 3R | A | QF | 4R | QF | QF | 0 / 13 | 37–13 | 74% |
| Wimbledon | A | Q1 | 1R | 1R | 2R | 2R | 4R | 1R | SF | NH | 2R | A | SF | QF | 3R | 1R | 0 / 13 | 22–13 | 63% |
| US Open | A | 1R | 2R | 1R | 3R | 3R | 4R | 4R | SF | A | QF | A | 3R | 3R | 1R | 3R | 0 / 13 | 26–13 | 67% |
| Win–loss | 0–0 | 0–1 | 2–4 | 3–4 | 9–4 | 7–4 | 12–4 | 9–4 | 15–4 | 6–2 | 10–4 | 2–1 | 11–3 | 12–4 | 10–4 | 11–4 | 0 / 51 | 119–51 | 70% |

=== Year-end championships (WTA Finals) ===
==== Singles: 3 (1 title, 2 runner-ups) ====
| Result | Year | Tournament | Surface | Opponent | Score |
|---|---|---|---|---|---|
| Win | 2018 | WTA Finals, Singapore | Hard (i) | (United States) Sloane Stephens | 3–6, 6–2, 6–2 |
| Loss | 2019 | WTA Finals, Shenzhen | Hard (i) | (Australia) Ashleigh Barty | 4–6, 3–6 |
| Loss | 2026 | WTA Finals, Indian Wells | Hard | Mirra Andreeva | 5–7, 3–6 |

=== WTA 1000 ===
==== Singles: 6 (5 titles, 1 runner-up) ====
| Result | Year | Tournament | Surface | Opponent | Score |
|---|---|---|---|---|---|
| Win | 2017 | Dubai Championships | Hard | (Denmark) Caroline Wozniacki | 6–4, 6–2 |
| Win | 2017 | Italian Open | Clay | (Romania) Simona Halep | 4–6, 7–5, 6–1 |
| Win | 2017 | Canadian Open | Hard | (Denmark) Caroline Wozniacki | 6–4, 6–0 |
| Win | 2018 | Italian Open (2) | Clay | (Romania) Simona Halep | 6–0, 6–4 |
| Loss | 2026 | Dubai Championships | Hard | (United States) Jessica Pegula | 2–6, 4–6 |
| Win | 2026 | Italian Open (3) | Clay | (United States) Coco Gauff | 6–4, 6–7^{(3–7)}, 6–2 |

==== Singles: 2 (1 title, 1 runner-up) ====
| Result | Year | Tournament | Surface | Opponent | Score |
|---|---|---|---|---|---|
| Win | 2018 | WTA Finals, Singapore | Hard (i) | (United States) Sloane Stephens | 3–6, 6–2, 6–2 |
| Loss | 2019 | WTA Finals, Shenzhen | Hard (i) | (Australia) Ashleigh Barty | 4–6, 3–6 |

=== Olympic Games ===
==== Bronze medal match ====
| Result | Year | Tournament | Surface | Opponent | Score |
|---|---|---|---|---|---|
| Bronze | 2021 | Tokyo Olympics 2020 | Hard | (Kazakhstan) Elena Rybakina | 1–6, 7–6^{(7–5)}, 6–4 |

== Recognition ==
- Member 3rd Class of the Order of Merit (2017)
- Member 2nd Class of the Order of Merit (2020)
- Honorary Citizen of Kharkiv (2020)
- Forbes 30 Under 30 (Europe, Sports & Games) (2020)
- Member 3rd Class of the Order of Princess Olga (2021)
