= 2001 Porsche Tennis Grand Prix – Singles =

Singles
- 2001 Porsche Tennis Grand Prix

Final
- Champion: (United States) Lindsay Davenport
- Runner-up: (Belgium) Justine Henin
- Score: 7–5, 6–4

Details
- Draw: 28 (3WC/4Q/2LL)
- Seeds: 8

Events
Singles	Doubles
← 2000 ·	Women's Stuttgart Open	· 2002 →

Martina Hingis was the two-time defending champion, but retired in the semifinals against Lindsay Davenport.

Davenport won the title, defeating Justine Henin in the final 7–5, 6–4.

== Seeds ==
The first four seeds received a bye into the second round.

1. (Switzerland) Martina Hingis (semifinals, retired)
2. (United States) Jennifer Capriati (quarterfinals)
3. (United States) Lindsay Davenport (champion)
4. (Belgium) Kim Clijsters (second round)
5. (France) Amélie Mauresmo (quarterfinals)
6. (Belgium) Justine Henin (final)
7. (France) Nathalie Tauziat (second round)
8. (United States) Meghann Shaughnessy (first round)

== Draw ==
=== Key ===
- Q = Qualifier
- WC = Wild card
- LL = Lucky loser
- Alt = Alternate
- SE = Special exempt
- PR = Protected ranking
- ITF = ITF entry
- JE = Junior exempt
- w/o = Walkover
- r = Retired
- d = Defaulted
- SR = Special ranking

=== Finals ===
Semifinals
1	(Switzerland) Martina Hingis	1^{r}
3	(United States) Lindsay Davenport	2
6	(Belgium) Justine Henin	6	7^{7}
(France) Sandrine Testud	3	6^{3}

Final
3	(United States) Lindsay Davenport	7	6
6	(Belgium) Justine Henin	5	4

=== Top half ===
First round
(Bulgaria) M Maleeva	7	7
(Spain) A Sánchez Vicario	5	5
(South Africa) A Coetzer	6	3	2
LL	(Russia) T Panova	1	6	6
WC	(United States) L Raymond	4	6	3
7	(France) N Tauziat	6	3	6
LL	(Luxembourg) A Kremer	4	6	7
(Russia) A Kournikova	6	2	5
WC	(Switzerland) P Schnyder	6	1	7
Q	(Slovakia) D Hantuchová	3	6	5
(Czech Republic) D Bedáňová	3	1
5	(France) A Mauresmo	6	6

Second round
1	(Switzerland) M Hingis	0	6	6
(Bulgaria) M Maleeva	6	4	2
LL	(Russia) T Panova	7^{7}	6
7	(France) N Tauziat	6^{5}	2
3	(United States) L Davenport	7	6
LL	(Luxembourg) A Kremer	5	4
WC	(Switzerland) P Schnyder	6	3	5
5	(France) A Mauresmo	3	6	7

Quarterfinals
1	(Switzerland) M Hingis	6	6
LL	(Russia) T Panova	1	2
3	(United States) L Davenport	6	6
5	(France) A Mauresmo	4	2

Semifinals
1	(Switzerland) M Hingis	1^{r}
3	(United States) L Davenport	2

=== Bottom half ===
First round
6	(Belgium) J Henin	6	7
Q	(Russia) E Bovina	2	5
(United States) C Rubin	6	7
(Austria) B Schett	2	5
(Russia) E Likhovtseva	3	6	2
(Germany) A Huber	6	2	6
8	(United States) M Shaughnessy	4	3
(Spain) M Serna	6	6
(France) S Testud	6	6
Q	(Slovenia) M Matevžič	2	2
WC	(Croatia) I Majoli	7	2	3
Q	(Netherlands) M Oremans	5	6	6

Second round
6	(Belgium) J Henin	7	3	6
(United States) C Rubin	5	6	3
(Germany) A Huber	6	4	6
4	(Belgium) K Clijsters	3	6	3
(Spain) M Serna	4	4
(France) S Testud	6	6
Q	(Netherlands) M Oremans	1	4
2	(United States) J Capriati	6	6

Quarterfinals
6	(Belgium) J Henin	6^{4}	6	7
(Germany) A Huber	7^{7}	2	5
(France) S Testud	2	6	6
2	(United States) J Capriati	6	3	3

Semifinals
6	(Belgium) J Henin	6	7^{7}
(France) S Testud	3	6^{3}

== Qualifying ==
=== Seeds ===
1. (Luxembourg) Anne Kremer (Qualifying competition, lucky loser)
2. (Russia) Tatiana Panova (Qualifying competition, lucky loser)
3. (Italy) Francesca Schiavone (second round)
4. (Czech Republic) Denisa Chládková (qualifying competition)
5. (Russia) Nadia Petrova (first round)
6. (Zimbabwe) Cara Black (second round)
7. (Slovakia) Daniela Hantuchová (qualified)
8. (Russia) Elena Bovina (qualified)

=== Qualifiers ===
1. (Slovenia) Maja Matevžič
2. (Netherlands) Miriam Oremans
3. (Slovakia) Daniela Hantuchová
4. (Russia) Elena Bovina

=== Lucky losers ===
1. (Luxembourg) Anne Kremer
2. (Russia) Tatiana Panova

=== Draw ===
==== First qualifier ====
First round
1	(Luxembourg) Anne Kremer	6	6
(Germany) Gréta Arn	3	2
(Czech Republic) Adriana Gerši	7	6
(Germany) Andrea Glass	5	4
(Slovenia) Maja Matevžič	6	6
(Germany) Martina Müller	3	2
WC	(Germany) Sandra Klösel	4	6	0
6	(Zimbabwe) Cara Black	6	4	6

Second round
1	(Luxembourg) Anne Kremer	6	6^{1}	6
(Czech Republic) Adriana Gerši	2	7^{7}	2
(Slovenia) Maja Matevžič	1	7	6
6	(Zimbabwe) Cara Black	6	5	0

Qualifying competition
1	(Luxembourg) Anne Kremer	6	6^{4}	2
(Slovenia) Maja Matevžič	3	7^{7}	6

==== Second qualifier ====
First round
2	(Russia) Tatiana Panova	1	6	6
(Slovakia) Karina Habšudová	6	4	1
(Venezuela) María Vento-Kabchi	3	2
(France) Anne-Gaëlle Sidot	6	6
WC	(Germany) Julia Schruff	7^{7}	2	4
(Netherlands) Miriam Oremans	6^{3}	6	6
(Germany) Anca Barna	4	6	6
5	(Russia) Nadia Petrova	6	4	0

Second round
2	(Russia) Tatiana Panova	6	7^{10}
(France) Anne-Gaëlle Sidot	1	6^{8}
(Netherlands) Miriam Oremans	6	7
(Germany) Anca Barna	4	5

Qualifying competition
2	(Russia) Tatiana Panova	3	6^{5}
(Netherlands) Miriam Oremans	6	7^{7}

==== Third qualifier ====
First round
3	(Italy) Francesca Schiavone	4	7	6
(Tunisia) Selima Sfar	6	5	3
(Sweden) Åsa Carlsson	6^{4}	7	7^{7}
WC	(Germany) Mia Buric	7^{7}	5	6^{3}
(Switzerland) Marie-Gaïané Mikaelian	6	6
(Germany) Jana Kandarr	1	3
(United States) Lilia Osterloh	4	4
7	(Slovakia) Daniela Hantuchová	6	6

Second round
3	(Italy) Francesca Schiavone	6	2	4
(Sweden) Åsa Carlsson	4	6	6
(Switzerland) Marie-Gaïané Mikaelian	4	3
7	(Slovakia) Daniela Hantuchová	6	6

Qualifying competition
(Sweden) Åsa Carlsson	3	6^{3}
7	(Slovakia) Daniela Hantuchová	6	7^{7}

==== Fourth qualifier ====
First round
4	(Czech Republic) Denisa Chládková	6	7^{7}
WC	(Germany) Scarlett Werner	4	6^{1}
(Slovenia) Janette Husárová	6	7^{8}
(Croatia) Maja Palaveršić-Coopersmith	2	6^{6}
(Germany) Barbara Rittner	2	1^{r}
(Czech Republic) Květa Hrdličková	6	0
(United States) Alexandra Stevenson	3	3
8	(Russia) Elena Bovina	6	6

Second round
4	(Czech Republic) Denisa Chládková	7	7
(Slovenia) Janette Husárová	5	5
(Czech Republic) Květa Hrdličková	6^{3}	6^{6}
8	(Russia) Elena Bovina	7^{7}	7^{8}

Qualifying competition
4	(Czech Republic) Denisa Chládková	1	3
8	(Russia) Elena Bovina	6	6
