= 1997 Porsche Tennis Grand Prix – Doubles =

Doubles
- 1997 Porsche Tennis Grand Prix

Final
- Champions: (Switzerland) Martina Hingis (Spain) Arantxa Sánchez Vicario
- Runners-up: (United States) Lindsay Davenport (Czech Republic) Jana Novotná
- Score: 7–6^{(7–4)}, 3–6, 7–6^{(7–3)}

Details
- Draw: 16
- Seeds: 4

Events
Singles	Doubles
← 1996 ·	Porsche Tennis Grand Prix	· 1998 →

Nicole Arendt and Jana Novotná were the defending champions but only Novotná competed that year with Lindsay Davenport.

Davenport and Novotná lost in the final 7–6^{(7–4)}, 3–6, 7–6^{(7–3)} against Martina Hingis and Arantxa Sánchez Vicario.

== Seeds ==
Champion seeds are indicated in bold text while text in italics indicates the round in which those seeds were eliminated.

1. (United States) Lindsay Davenport / (Czech Republic) Jana Novotná (final)
2. (United States) Mary Joe Fernández / (Belarus) Natasha Zvereva (quarterfinals)
3. (Switzerland) **Martina Hingis** / (Spain) **Arantxa Sánchez Vicario (champions)**
4. (Latvia) Larisa Neiland / (Czech Republic) Helena Suková (first round)

== Draw ==
=== Key ===
- Q = Qualifier
- WC = Wild card
- LL = Lucky loser
- Alt = Alternate
- ITF = ITF entry
- PR = Protected ranking
- SR = Special ranking
- SE = Special exempt
- JE = Junior exempt
- JR = Junior Accelerator Programme entrant
- CO = College Accelerator Programme entrant
- NG = Next Gen Accelerator Program entrant
- w/o = Walkover
- r = Retired
- d = Defaulted

First round
1	(United States) **L Davenport** (Czech Republic) **J Novotná**	**6**	**6**
(Russia) A Kournikova (Russia) E Likhovtseva	2	4
Q	(Austria) **B Schett** (Switzerland) **P Schnyder**	**6**	**7**
(Belgium) S Appelmans (Netherlands) M Oremans	3	6
4	(Latvia) L Neiland (Czech Republic) H Suková	6	6
(Indonesia) **Y Basuki** (Netherlands) **C Vis**	**7**	**7**
(United States) **K Adams** (Netherlands) **K Boogert**	**6**	**6**
(Italy) S Farina (Italy) R Grande	4	2
WC	(Germany) M Babel (Germany) A Huber	3	4
(Netherlands) **B Schultz-McCarthy** (Romania) **I Spîrlea**	**6**	**6**
(Spain) C Martínez (Argentina) P Tarabini	3	1
3	(Switzerland) **M Hingis** (Spain) **A Sánchez Vicario**	**6**	**6**
(Netherlands) M Bollegraf (Belgium) E Callens	6	4
(United States) **L Raymond** (Australia) **R Stubbs**	**7**	**6**
(Romania) R Dragomir (Croatia) I Majoli	2	4
2	(United States) **M J Fernández** (Czech Republic) **N Zvereva**	**6**	**6**

Quarterfinals
1	(United States) **L Davenport** (Czech Republic) **J Novotná**	w/o
Q	(Austria) B Schett (Switzerland) P Schnyder
(Indonesia) **Y Basuki** (Netherlands) **C Vis**	**6**	**6**
(United States) K Adams (Netherlands) K Boogert	4	3
(Netherlands) B Schultz-McCarthy (Romania) I Spîrlea	3	6
3	(Switzerland) **M Hingis** (Spain) **A Sánchez Vicario**	**6**	**7**
(United States) **L Raymond** (Australia) **R Stubbs**	**6**	**6**
2	(United States) M J Fernández (Belarus) N Zvereva	4	1

Semifinals
1	(United States) **L Davenport** (Czech Republic) **J Novotná**	**6**	**6**
(Indonesia) Y Basuki (Netherlands) C Vis	2	3
3	(Switzerland) **M Hingis** (Spain) **A Sánchez Vicario**	**6**	**6**
(United States) L Raymond (Australia) R Stubbs	4	4

Final
1	(United States) Lindsay Davenport (Czech Republic) Jana Novotná	6	**6**	6
3	(Switzerland) **Martina Hingis** (Spain) **Arantxa Sánchez Vicario**	**7**	3	**7**
