= 1993 Porsche Tennis Grand Prix – Singles =

Singles
- 1993 Porsche Tennis Grand Prix

Final
- Champion: (France) Mary Pierce
- Runner-up: (Belarus) Natasha Zvereva
- Score: 6–3, 6–3

Details
- Draw: 32 (2WC/4Q)
- Seeds: 8

Events
Singles	Doubles
← 1992 ·	Women's Stuttgart Open	· 1994 →

Martina Navratilova was the defending champion, but lost in the quarterfinals to Natasha Zvereva.

Mary Pierce won the title by defeating Zvereva 6–3, 6–3 in the final.

== Seeds ==
1. (United States) Martina Navratilova (quarterfinals)
2. (Spain) Conchita Martínez (quarterfinals)
3. (France) Mary Pierce (champion)
4. (France) Nathalie Tauziat (semifinals)
5. (United States) Zina Garrison Jackson (semifinals)
6. (Belarus) Natasha Zvereva (final)
7. (United States) Lori McNeil (first round)
8. (France) Julie Halard (second round)

== Draw ==
Key

- Q = Qualifier
- WC = Wild card
- LL = Lucky loser
- Alt = Alternate
- ITF = ITF entry
- PR = Protected ranking
- SR = Special ranking
- SE = Special exempt
- JE = Junior exempt
- JR = Junior Accelerator Programme entrant
- CO = College Accelerator Programme entrant
- NG = Next Gen Accelerator Program entrant
- w/o = Walkover
- r = Retired
- d = Defaulted

=== Finals ===
Semifinals
6	(Belarus) Natasha Zvereva	4	7^{7}	6
4	(France) Nathalie Tauziat	6	6^{3}	3
3	(France) Mary Pierce	6	6
5	(United States) Zina Garrison Jackson	2	2

Final
6	(Belarus) Natasha Zvereva	3	3
3	(France) Mary Pierce	6	6

=== Top half ===
First round
1	(United States) M Navratilova	6	6
(Slovakia) R Zrubáková	2	2
Q	(Russia) E Maniokova	6	4	7^{7}
(Netherlands) M Oremans	3	6	6^{4}
Q	(Slovakia) K Habšudová	6	6
Q	(United States) K Adams	2	0
(Croatia) I Majoli	4	4
6	(Belarus) N Zvereva	6	6
4	(France) N Tauziat	6	6
(United States) P Shriver	4	4
(United States) G Fernández	6	6
(Germany) W Probst	2	4
(Romania) R Dragomir	6	1	3
(Ukraine) N Medvedeva	3	6	6
(Georgia (country)) L Meskhi	6^{2}	6	7^{7}
7	(United States) L McNeil	7^{7}	4	6^{3}

Second round
1	(United States) M Navratilova	6	6
Q	(Russia) E Maniokova	4	2
Q	(Slovakia) K Habšudová	2	6	2
6	(Belarus) N Zvereva	6	4	6
4	(France) N Tauziat	4	7	6
(United States) G Fernández	6	5	4
(Ukraine) N Medvedeva	3	6	6
(Georgia (country)) L Meskhi	6	3	0

Quarterfinals
1	(United States) M Navratilova	3	6^{5}
6	(Belarus) N Zvereva	6	7^{7}
4	(France) N Tauziat	6	6
(Ukraine) N Medvedeva	2	3

Semifinals
6	(Belarus) N Zvereva	4	7^{7}	6
4	(France) N Tauziat	6	6^{3}	3

=== Bottom half ===
First round
8	(France) J Halard	6^{4}	7	6
(United States) N Arendt	7^{7}	5	1
(Germany) B Rittner	6	6
(United States) T Whitlinger	3	1
WC	(Germany) M Kochta	6	6
(Netherlands) S Rottier	4	1
(Germany) S Frankl	1	0
3	(France) M Pierce	6	6
5	(United States) Z Garrison Jackson	6	6
(United States) K Po	3	4
(South Africa) E Reinach	3	6	4
Q	(Hungary) A Temesvári	6	4	6
(South Africa) R Nideffer	6	4	7^{7}
(United States) G Helgeson	4	6	6^{4}
WC	(Germany) C Singer	1	5
2	(Spain) C Martínez	6	7

Second round
8	(France) J Halard	1	4
(Germany) B Rittner	6	6
WC	(Germany) M Kochta	2	5
3	(France) M Pierce	6	7
5	(United States) Z Garrison Jackson	6	6
Q	(Hungary) A Temesvári	3	1
(South Africa) R Nideffer	2	0
2	(Spain) C Martínez	6	6

Quarterfinals
(Germany) B Rittner	6	3	5
3	(France) M Pierce	4	6	7
5	(United States) Z Garrison Jackson	7^{7}	6
2	(Spain) C Martínez	6^{4}	4

Semifinals
3	(France) M Pierce	6	6
5	(United States) Z Garrison Jackson	2	2
