= 1982 Porsche Tennis Grand Prix – Doubles =

Doubles
- 1982 Porsche Tennis Grand Prix

Final
- Champions: (United States) Martina Navratilova (United States) Pam Shriver
- Runners-up: (United States) Candy Reynolds (Australia) Anne Smith
- Score: 6–2, 6–3

Details
- Draw: 16
- Seeds: 4

Events
Singles	Doubles
← 1981 ·	Women's Stuttgart Open	· 1983 →

Mima Jaušovec and Martina Navratilova were the defending champions, but competed this year with different partners.

Jaušovec teamed up with Eva Pfaff and lost in the first round to Bettina Bunge and Claudia Kohde-Kilsch.

Navratilova teamed up with Pam Shriver and successfully defended her title, by defeating Candy Reynolds and Anne Smith 6–2, 6–3 in the final.

== Seeds ==
1. (United States) Martina Navratilova / (United States) Pam Shriver (champions)
2. (United States) Candy Reynolds / (United States) Anne Smith (final)
3. (United States) JoAnne Russell / (Romania) Virginia Ruzici (semifinals)
4. (West Germany) Bettina Bunge / (West Germany) Claudia Kohde-Kilsch (quarterfinals)

== Draw ==
=== Key ===
- Q = Qualifier
- WC = Wild card
- LL = Lucky loser
- Alt = Alternate
- ITF = ITF entry
- PR = Protected ranking
- SR = Special ranking
- SE = Special exempt
- JE = Junior exempt
- JR = Junior Accelerator Programme entrant
- CO = College Accelerator Programme entrant
- NG = Next Gen Accelerator Program entrant
- w/o = Walkover
- r = Retired
- d = Defaulted

=== Draw ===
First round
1	(United States) M Navratilova (United States) P Shriver	6	6
(Czechoslovakia) H Mandlíková (Czechoslovakia) H Suková	4	4
(Czechoslovakia) I Budařová (Czechoslovakia) M Skuherská	6	6	0
(United Kingdom) J Durie (Hungary) A Temesvári	7	4	6
3	(United States) J Russell (Romania) V Ruzici	6	6
(Switzerland) P Delhees (Netherlands) M Mesker	2	3
(South Korea) D-h Lee (Hungary) M Pinterová	1	3
(Brazil) P Medrado (Australia) C O'Neil	6	6
(United States) Z Garrison (United States) A Leand	6	4
(United States) K Horvath (Italy) S Simmonds	7	6
(Socialist Federal Republic of Yugoslavia) M Jaušovec (West Germany) E Pfaff	4	5
4	(West Germany) B Bunge (West Germany) C Kohde-Kilsch	6	7
(Czechoslovakia) Y Brzáková (Czechoslovakia) K Skronská	6	0	2
(South Africa) R Fairbank (France) C Tanvier	4	6	6
(United States) S Collins (Netherlands) B Stöve	7	4	4
2	(United States) C Reynolds (United States) A Smith	5	6	6

Quarterfinals
1	(United States) M Navratilova (United States) P Shriver	6	7
(United Kingdom) J Durie (Hungary) A Temesvári	4	5
3	(United States) J Russell (Romania) V Ruzici	6	6
(Brazil) P Medrado (Australia) C O'Neil	2	3
(United States) K Horvath (Italy) S Simmonds	7	6	6
4	(West Germany) B Bunge (West Germany) C Kohde-Kilsch	5	7	4
(South Africa) R Fairbank (France) C Tanvier	2	3
2	(United States) C Reynolds (United States) A Smith	6	6

Semifinals
1	(United States) M Navratilova (United States) P Shriver	6	6
3	(United States) J Russell (Romania) V Ruzici	3	1
(United States) K Horvath (Italy) S Simmonds	6	2
2	(United States) C Reynolds (United States) A Smith	7	6

Final
1	(United States) M Navratilova (United States) P Shriver	6	6
2	(United States) C Reynolds (United States) A Smith	2	3
