= 1993 Porsche Tennis Grand Prix – Doubles =

Doubles
- 1993 Porsche Tennis Grand Prix

Final
- Champions: (United States) Gigi Fernández (Belarus) Natasha Zvereva
- Runners-up: (United States) Patty Fendick (United States) Martina Navratilova
- Score: 7–6^{(8–6)}, 6–4

Details
- Draw: 16 (1Q)
- Seeds: 4

Events
Singles	Doubles
← 1992 ·	Women's Stuttgart Open	· 1994 →

Arantxa Sánchez Vicario and Helena Suková were the defending champions, but none competed this year.

Gigi Fernández and Natasha Zvereva won the title by defeating Patty Fendick and Martina Navratilova 7–6^{(8–6)}, 6–4 in the final.

== Seeds ==
1. (United States) Gigi Fernández / (Belarus) Natasha Zvereva (champions)
2. (United States) Lori McNeil / (Australia) Rennae Stubbs (first round)
3. (United States) Pam Shriver / (Australia) Elizabeth Smylie (semifinals)
4. (United States) Zina Garrison Jackson / (Spain) Conchita Martínez (quarterfinals)

== Draw ==
Key

- Q = Qualifier
- WC = Wild card
- LL = Lucky loser
- Alt = Alternate
- ITF = ITF entry
- PR = Protected ranking
- SR = Special ranking
- SE = Special exempt
- JE = Junior exempt
- JR = Junior Accelerator Programme entrant
- CO = College Accelerator Programme entrant
- NG = Next Gen Accelerator Program entrant
- w/o = Walkover
- r = Retired
- d = Defaulted

=== Draw ===
First round
1	(United States) G Fernández (Belarus) N Zvereva	6	6
(Netherlands) M Oremans (Germany) B Rittner	2	4
(Slovakia) K Habšudová (Slovakia) R Zrubáková	2	6	6
(United States) G Helgeson (Hungary) A Temesvári	6	2	1
3	(United States) P Shriver (Australia) E Smylie	3	7	7
(South Africa) R Nideffer (South Africa) E Reinach	6	5	5
(United States) D Graham (Netherlands) B Schultz	7^{7}	6
(Germany) W Probst (Germany) C Singer	6^{1}	2
(United States) P Fendick (United States) M Navratilova	6	3	6
(United States) K Adams (Netherlands) M Bollegraf	3	6	3
(United States) N Arendt (United States) K Po	3	2
4	(United States) Z Garrison Jackson (Spain) C Martínez	6	6
(Russia) E Maniokova (Georgia (country)) L Meskhi	3	r
Q	(Ukraine) E Brioukhovets (Ukraine) N Medvedeva	6
(France) J Halard (France) N Tauziat	6	7
2	(United States) L McNeil (Australia) R Stubbs	4	5

Quarterfinals
1	(United States) G Fernández (Belarus) N Zvereva	6	6
(Slovakia) K Habšudová (Slovakia) R Zrubáková	4	2
3	(United States) P Shriver (Australia) E Smylie	6	7^{7}
(United States) D Graham (Netherlands) B Schultz	4	6^{4}
(United States) P Fendick (United States) M Navratilova	6	3	6
4	(United States) Z Garrison Jackson (Spain) C Martínez	1	6	2
Q	(Ukraine) E Brioukhovets (Ukraine) N Medvedeva	3	4
(France) J Halard (France) N Tauziat	6	6

Semifinals
1	(United States) G Fernández (Belarus) N Zvereva	6	4	6
3	(United States) P Shriver (Australia) E Smylie	2	6	2
(United States) P Fendick (United States) M Navratilova	6	6
(France) J Halard (France) N Tauziat	4	4

Final
1	(United States) G Fernández (Belarus) N Zvereva	7^{8}	6
(United States) P Fendick (United States) M Navratilova	6^{6}	4
