= 1994 Porsche Tennis Grand Prix – Doubles =

Doubles
- 1994 Porsche Tennis Grand Prix

Final
- Champions: (United States) Gigi Fernández (Belarus) Natasha Zvereva
- Runners-up: (Netherlands) Manon Bollegraf (Latvia) Larisa Neiland
- Score: 7–6^{(7–5)}, 6–4

Details
- Draw: 16 (1WC/1Q)
- Seeds: 4

Events
Singles	Doubles
← 1993 ·	Women's Stuttgart Open	· 1995 →

Gigi Fernández and Natasha Zvereva successfully defended their title by defeating Manon Bollegraf and Larisa Neiland 7–6^{(7–5)}, 6–4 in the final.

== Seeds ==
1. (United States) Gigi Fernández / (Belarus) Natasha Zvereva (champions)
2. (United States) Patty Fendick / (United States) Meredith McGrath (first round)
3. (Netherlands) Manon Bollegraf / (Latvia) Larisa Neiland (final)
4. (United States) Katrina Adams / (United States) Zina Garrison (quarterfinals)

== Draw ==
=== Key ===
- Q = Qualifier
- WC = Wild card
- LL = Lucky loser
- Alt = Alternate
- SE = Special exempt
- PR = Protected ranking
- ITF = ITF entry
- JE = Junior exempt
- w/o = Walkover
- r = Retired
- d = Defaulted
- SR = Special ranking

=== Draw ===
First round
1	(United States) G Fernández (Belarus) N Zvereva	6	6
(France) J Halard (France) N Tauziat	2	3
(Canada) J Hetherington (United States) S Stafford	4	6	3
(Argentina) G Sabatini (Netherlands) B Schultz	6	2	6
4	(United States) K Adams (United States) Z Garrison	6	6
(United States) N Arendt (Australia) K Radford	4	4
Q	(United States) A Henricksson (France) K Quentrec	4	2
WC	(Germany) A Huber (Netherlands) M Oremans	6	6
(Russia) E Maniokova (Georgia (country)) L Meskhi	2	6	7
(South Africa) A Coetzer (Spain) C Martínez	6	1	5
(United States) MJ Fernández (Czech Republic) H Suková	4	6^{4}
3	(Netherlands) M Bollegraf (Latvia) L Neiland	6	7^{7}
(United States) L McNeil (Australia) R Stubbs	3	7^{9}	7
(Bulgaria) K Maleeva (Ukraine) N Medvedeva	6	6^{7}	5
(United States) D Graham (Netherlands) C Vis	5	6	6
2	(United States) P Fendick (United States) M McGrath	7	4	4

Quarterfinals
1	(United States) G Fernández (Belarus) N Zvereva	7^{7}	7
(Argentina) G Sabatini (Netherlands) B Schultz	6^{2}	5
4	(United States) K Adams (United States) Z Garrison	2	5
WC	(Germany) A Huber (Netherlands) M Oremans	6	7
(Russia) E Maniokova (Georgia (country)) L Meskhi	2	2
3	(Netherlands) M Bollegraf (Latvia) L Neiland	6	6
(United States) L McNeil (Australia) R Stubbs	3	7^{7}	4
(United States) D Graham (Netherlands) C Vis	6	6^{2}	6

Semifinals
1	(United States) G Fernández (Belarus) N Zvereva	6	6
WC	(Germany) A Huber (Netherlands) M Oremans	0	2
3	(Netherlands) M Bollegraf (Latvia) L Neiland	6	6
(United States) D Graham (Netherlands) C Vis	2	2

Final
1	(United States) G Fernández (Belarus) N Zvereva	7^{7}	6
3	(Netherlands) M Bollegraf (Latvia) L Neiland	6^{5}	4
