= 1995 Porsche Tennis Grand Prix – Doubles =

Doubles
- 1995 Porsche Tennis Grand Prix

Final
- Champions: (United States) Gigi Fernández (Belarus) Natasha Zvereva
- Runners-up: (United States) Meredith McGrath (Latvia) Larisa Neiland
- Score: 5–7, 6–1, 6–4

Details
- Draw: 16
- Seeds: 4

Events
| Singles | Doubles |
| ← 1994 · | Women's Stuttgart Open | · 1996 → |

Gigi Fernández and Natasha Zvereva were the defending champions and successfully defended their title, by defeating Meredith McGrath and Larisa Neiland 5–7, 6–1, 6–4 in the final.

== Seeds ==
1. (United States) Gigi Fernández / (Belarus) Natasha Zvereva (champions)
2. (United States) Meredith McGrath / (Latvia) Larisa Neiland (final)
3. (United States) Lindsay Davenport / (United States) Lisa Raymond (semifinals)
4. (Netherlands) Brenda Schultz-McCarthy / (Australia) Rennae Stubbs (semifinals)

== Draw ==
=== Key ===
- Q = Qualifier
- WC = Wild card
- LL = Lucky loser
- Alt = Alternate
- SE = Special exempt
- PR = Protected ranking
- ITF = ITF entry
- JE = Junior exempt
- w/o = Walkover
- r = Retired
- d = Defaulted
- SR = Special ranking

=== Draw ===
First round
1 | (United States) G Fernández (Belarus) N Zvereva | 6 | 7
(South Africa) M de Swardt (Belgium) N Feber | 3 | 5
(France) J Halard (France) N Tauziat | 6 | 4 | 7^{8}
(Switzerland) M Hingis (Croatia) I Majoli | 3 | 6 | 6^{6}
4 | (Netherlands) B Schultz-McCarthy (Australia) R Stubbs | 6 | 6
Q | (United States) L Lee (Germany) C Schneider | 4 | 4
(United States) L McNeil (Czech Republic) H Suková | 5 | 6 | 6
(Belgium) S Appelmans (Netherlands) M Oremans | 7 | 1 | 1
(United States) C Rubin (Netherlands) C Vis | 6 | 6
WC | (France) M Pierce (Hungary) A Temesvári | 2 | 1
(Argentina) G Sabatini (Argentina) P Tarabini | 1 | 3
3 | (United States) L Davenport (United States) L Raymond | 6 | 6
(United States) N Arendt (Netherlands) M Bollegraf | 2 | 7^{10} | 6
(Germany) A Huber (Germany) C Porwik | 6 | 6^{8} | 4
(United States) K Adams (United States) Z Garrison-Jackson | 4 | 4
2 | (United States) M McGrath (Latvia) L Neiland | 6 | 6

Quarterfinals
1 | (United States) G Fernández (Belarus) N Zvereva | 6 | 6
(France) J Halard (France) N Tauziat | 4 | 3
4 | (Netherlands) B Schultz-McCarthy (Australia) R Stubbs | 6 | 7^{7}
(United States) L McNeil (Czech Republic) H Suková | 1 | 6^{4}
(United States) C Rubin (Netherlands) C Vis | 3 | 3
3 | (United States) L Davenport (United States) L Raymond | 6 | 6
(United States) N Arendt (Netherlands) M Bollegraf | 3 | 3
2 | (United States) M McGrath (Latvia) L Neiland | 6 | 6

Semifinals
1 | (United States) G Fernández (Belarus) N Zvereva | 7 | 7^{7}
4 | (Netherlands) B Schultz-McCarthy (Australia) R Stubbs | 5 | 6^{4}
3 | (United States) L Davenport (United States) L Raymond | 6 | 1 | 4
2 | (United States) M McGrath (Latvia) L Neiland | 3 | 6 | 6

Final
1 | (United States) G Fernández (Belarus) N Zvereva | 5 | 6 | 6
2 | (United States) M McGrath (Latvia) L Neiland | 7 | 1 | 4
