= 1998 Porsche Tennis Grand Prix – Singles =

Singles
- 1998 Porsche Tennis Grand Prix

Final
- Champion: (France) Sandrine Testud
- Runner-up: (United States) Lindsay Davenport
- Score: 7–5, 6–3

Details
- Draw: 28 (3WC / 4Q)
- Seeds: 8

Events
Singles	Doubles
← 1997 ·	Porsche Tennis Grand Prix	· 1999 →

Martina Hingis was the defending champion, but lost in the quarterfinals to Dominique Van Roost.

Sandrine Testud won the title, defeating Lindsay Davenport in the final 7–5, 6–3.

== Seeds ==
A champion seed is indicated in bold text while text in italics indicates the round in which that seed was eliminated. The top four seeds received a bye to the second round.

1. (Switzerland) Martina Hingis (quarterfinals)
2. (United States) Lindsay Davenport (final)
3. (Czech Republic) Jana Novotná (second round)
4. (Spain) Arantxa Sánchez Vicario (semifinals)
5. (United States) Venus Williams (second round)
6. (Spain) Conchita Martínez (second round)
7. (France) Nathalie Tauziat (quarterfinals)
8. (Switzerland) Patty Schnyder (first round)

== Draw ==
=== Key ===
- Q = Qualifier
- WC = Wild card
- LL = Lucky loser
- Alt = Alternate
- SE = Special exempt
- PR = Protected ranking
- ITF = ITF entry
- JE = Junior exempt
- w/o = Walkover
- r = Retired
- d = Defaulted
- SR = Special ranking

=== Final ===
Semifinals
WC	(Belgium) Dominique Van Roost	2	0
(France) **Sandrine Testud**	**6**	**6**
4	(Spain) Arantxa Sánchez Vicario	6	4
2	(United States) **Lindsay Davenport**	**7**	**6**

Final
(France) **Sandrine Testud**	**7**	**6**
2	(United States) Lindsay Davenport	5	3

=== Section 1 ===
First round
(Russia) **A Kournikova**	1	**6**	**7**
Q	(Austria) B Schett	**6**	4	6
(Spain) M Serna	**6**	5	2
WC	(Belgium) **D Van Roost**	2	**7**	**6**
(Italy) S Farina	2	**6**	3
5	(United States) **V Williams**	**6**	4	**6**
Q	(Czech Republic) K Hrdličková	6	**6**	0
(United States) **S Williams**	**7**	3	**6**
(France) **S Testud**	5	**6**	**6**
(Russia) E Likhovtseva	**7**	1	0
(Germany) **A Huber**	**6**	**6**
8	(Switzerland) P Schnyder	4	1

Second round
1	(Switzerland) **M Hingis**	1	**6**	**6**
(Russia) A Kournikova	**6**	2	2
WC	(Belgium) **D Van Roost**	**6**	**6**
5	(United States) V Williams	1	2
3	(Czech Republic) J Novotná	**6**	3	0/r
(United States) **S Williams**	2	**6**	2
(France) **S Testud**	**6**	4	**6**
(Germany) A Huber	2	**6**	2

Quarterfinals
1	(Switzerland) M Hingis	3	**7**	4
WC	(Belgium) **D Van Roost**	**6**	6	**6**
(United States) S Williams	3	**6**	1
(France) **S Testud**	**6**	1	**6**

Semifinals
WC	(Belgium) D Van Roost	2	0
(France) **S Testud**	**6**	**6**

=== Section 2 ===
First round
WC/6	(Spain) **C Martínez**	3	**6**	**6**
(Romania) I Spîrlea	**6**	2	2
(United States) **L Raymond**	3	**6**	**6**
(Romania) R Dragomir	**6**	2	4
Q	(France) **A Mauresmo**	**6**	**6**
WC	(Germany) A Glass	2	1
7	(France) **N Tauziat**	**6**	6	**6**
(United States) K Po	4	**7**	2
(Belarus) **N Zvereva**	**6**	**6**
Q	(Germany) J Kandarr	3	2
(France) **M Pierce**	**6**	**6**
(South Africa) A Coetzer	2	2

Second round
WC/6	(Spain) C Martínez	4	**6**	2
(United States) **L Raymond**	**6**	2	**6**
Q	(France) A Mauresmo	3	2
4	(Spain) **A Sánchez Vicario**	**6**	**6**
7	(France) **N Tauziat**	**6**	**6**
(Belarus) N Zvereva	3	3
(France) M Pierce	1	3
2	(United States) **L Davenport**	**6**	**6**

Quarterfinals
(United States) L Raymond	**6**	5	2
4	(Spain) **A Sánchez Vicario**	1	**7**	**6**
7	(France) N Tauziat	6	5
2	(United States) **L Davenport**	**7**	**7**

Semifinals
4	(Spain) A Sánchez Vicario	6	4
2	(United States) **L Davenport**	**7**	**6**
