= 1996 Porsche Tennis Grand Prix – Singles =

Singles
- 1996 Porsche Tennis Grand Prix

Final
- Champion: (Switzerland) Martina Hingis
- Runner-up: (Germany) Anke Huber
- Score: 6–2, 3–6, 6–3

Details
- Draw: 24
- Seeds: 8

Events
Singles	Doubles
← 1995 ·	Porsche Tennis Grand Prix	· 1997 →

Iva Majoli was the defending champion but lost in the quarterfinals to Judith Wiesner.

Martina Hingis won the title, defeating Anke Huber in the final 6–2, 3–6, 6–3. This was the first WTA title of Hingis's career.

== Seeds ==
A champion seed is indicated in bold text while text in italics indicates the round in which that seed was eliminated. The top four seeds received a bye to the second round.

1. (Spain) Arantxa Sánchez Vicario (quarterfinals)
2. (Spain) Conchita Martínez (quarterfinals)
3. (Croatia) Iva Majoli (quarterfinals)
4. (United States) Lindsay Davenport (semifinals)
5. (Germany) Anke Huber (final)
6. (Czech Republic) Jana Novotná (quarterfinals)
7. (United States) Mary Joe Fernández (first round)
8. (Switzerland) **Martina Hingis (champion)**

== Draw ==
=== Key ===
- Q = Qualifier
- WC = Wild card
- LL = Lucky loser
- Alt = Alternate
- SE = Special exempt
- PR = Protected ranking
- ITF = ITF entry
- JE = Junior exempt
- w/o = Walkover
- r = Retired
- d = Defaulted
- SR = Special ranking

=== Final ===
Semifinals
8	(Switzerland) **Martina Hingis**	3	**6**	**6**
4	(United States) Lindsay Davenport	**6**	2	3
(Austria) Judith Wiesner	1	1
5	(Germany) **Anke Huber**	**6**	**6**

Final
8	(Switzerland) **Martina Hingis**	**6**	3	**6**
5	(Germany) Anke Huber	2	**6**	3

=== Section 1 ===
First round
Q	(United States) **J Capriati**	**7**	**6**
(Belarus) N Zvereva	6	3
(Czech Republic) H Suková	1	3
(South Africa) **A Coetzer**	**6**	**6**
(Japan) N Sawamatsu	0	3
8	(Switzerland) **M Hingis**	**6**	**6**
(Bulgaria) M Maleeva	**6**	5	5
Q	(Ukraine) **N Medvedeva**	3	**7**	**7**
(Belgium) **D Van Roost**	**7**	**6**
Q	(United States) M Werdel-Witmeyer	5	4
Q	(United Kingdom) S Smith	1	2
6	(Czech Republic) **J Novotná**	**6**	**6**

Second round
1	(Spain) **A Sánchez Vicario**	**6**	**6**
Q	(United States) J Capriati	4	4
(South Africa) A Coetzer	1	5
8	(Switzerland) **M Hingis**	**6**	**7**
4	(United States) **L Davenport**	**6**	**6**
Q	(Ukraine) N Medvedeva	1	3
(Belgium) D Van Roost	2	1
6	(Czech Republic) **J Novotná**	**6**	**6**

Quarterfinals
1	(Spain) A Sánchez Vicario	1	4
8	(Switzerland) **M Hingis**	**6**	**6**
4	(United States) **L Davenport**	**6**	**6**
6	(Czech Republic) J Novotná	3	4

Semifinals
8	(Switzerland) **M Hingis**	3	**6**	**6**
4	(United States) L Davenport	**6**	2	3

=== Section 2 ===
First round
7	(United States) M J Fernández	3	6
(Slovakia) **K Habšudová**	**6**	**7**
(Austria) **J Wiesner**	**7**	**7**
(France) N Tauziat	5	5
(Russia) E Likhovtseva	2	4
WC	(Germany) **B Rittner**	**6**	**6**
5	(Germany) **A Huber**	**6**	**6**
WC	(Bulgaria) E Pampoulova	2	1
(United States) L Raymond	6	3
(Netherlands) **B Schultz-McCarthy**	**7**	**6**
(Sweden) **Å Carlsson**	**7**	**6**
(Argentina) G Sabatini	5	4

Second round
(Slovakia) K Habšudová	**6**	4	2
(Austria) **J Wiesner**	1	**6**	**6**
WC	(Germany) B Rittner	4	3
3	(Croatia) **I Majoli**	**6**	**6**
5	(Germany) **A Huber**	**6**	**6**
(Netherlands) B Schultz-McCarthy	1	4
(Sweden) Å Carlsson	5	4
2	(Spain) **C Martínez**	**7**	**6**

Quarterfinals
(Austria) **J Wiesner**	**6**	**7**
3	(Croatia) I Majoli	4	5
5	(Germany) **A Huber**	**6**	**6**
2	(Spain) C Martínez	1	3

Semifinals
(Austria) J Wiesner	1	1
5	(Germany) **A Huber**	**6**	**6**
