= 1996 Porsche Tennis Grand Prix – Doubles =

Doubles
- 1996 Porsche Tennis Grand Prix

Final
- Champions: (United States) Nicole Arendt (Czech Republic) Jana Novotná
- Runners-up: (Switzerland) Martina Hingis (Czech Republic) Helena Suková
- Score: 6–2, 6–3

Events
Singles	Doubles
← 1995 ·	Porsche Tennis Grand Prix	· 1997 →

Gigi Fernández and Natasha Zvereva were the defending champions but only Zvereva competed that year with Lisa Raymond.

Raymond and Zvereva lost in the semifinals to Nicole Arendt and Jana Novotná.

Arendt and Novotná won in the final 6–2, 6–3 against Martina Hingis and Helena Suková.

== Seeds ==
Champion seeds are indicated in bold text while text in italics indicates the round in which those seeds were eliminated.

1. (United States) Lindsay Davenport / (United States) Mary Joe Fernández (first round)
2. (United States) **Nicole Arendt** / (Czech Republic) **Jana Novotná (champions)**
3. (United States) Lisa Raymond / (Belarus) Natasha Zvereva (semifinals)
4. (Switzerland) Martina Hingis / (Czech Republic) Helena Suková (semifinals)

== Draw ==
=== Key ===
- Q = Qualifier
- WC = Wild card
- LL = Lucky loser
- Alt = Alternate
- SE = Special exempt
- PR = Protected ranking
- ITF = ITF entry
- JE = Junior exempt
- w/o = Walkover
- r = Retired
- d = Defaulted
- SR = Special ranking

First round
1	(United States) L Davenport (United States) M J Fernández
(Latvia) **L Savchenko** (France) **N Tauziat**	w/o
(United States) **L McNeil** (Argentina) **G Sabatini**	3	**6**	**6**
(Spain) C Martínez (Argentina) P Tarabini	**6**	4	2
4	(Switzerland) **M Hingis** (Czech Republic) **H Suková**	**7**	**6**
WC	(Germany) P Begerow (Germany) J Kandarr	5	1
(Sweden) Å Carlsson (Belgium) D Van Roost	5	**6**	2
(Belgium) **S Appelmans** (Germany) **B Rittner**	**7**	4	**6**
(Germany) **A Huber** (Croatia) **I Majoli**	1	**7**	**6**
Q	(Austria) S Dopfer (Germany) M Zivec-Skulj	**6**	5	2
(Germany) C Schneider (United Kingdom) S Smith	0	2
3	(United States) **L Raymond** (Belarus) **N Zvereva**	**6**	**6**
(Netherlands) **B Schultz-McCarthy** (Netherlands) **C Vis**	**6**	6	**6**
(Slovakia) K Habšudová (Ukraine) N Medvedeva	4	**7**	4
(Ukraine) O Lugina (Bulgaria) E Pampoulova	1	5
2	(United States) **N Arendt** (Czech Republic) **J Novotná**	**6**	**7**

Quarterfinals
(Latvia) **L Savchenko** (France) **N Tauziat**	**7**	**6**
(United States) L McNeil (Argentina) G Sabatini	6	1
4	(Switzerland) **M Hingis** (Czech Republic) **H Suková**	**6**	**6**
(Belgium) S Appelmans (Germany) B Rittner	1	1
(Germany) A Huber (Croatia) I Majoli	**6**	1	6
3	(United States) **L Raymond** (Belarus) **N Zvereva**	2	**6**	**7**
(Netherlands) B Schultz-McCarthy (Netherlands) C Vis	3	3
2	(United States) **N Arendt** (Czech Republic) **J Novotná**	**6**	**6**

Semifinals
(Latvia) L Savchenko (France) N Tauziat	1	5
4	(Switzerland) **M Hingis** (Czech Republic) **H Suková**	**6**	**7**
3	(United States) L Raymond (Belarus) N Zvereva	3	5
2	(United States) **N Arendt** (Czech Republic) **J Novotná**	**6**	**7**

Final
4	(Switzerland) Martina Hingis (Czech Republic) Helena Suková	2	3
2	(United States) **Nicole Arendt** (Czech Republic) **Jana Novotná**	**6**	**6**
