= 2018 Porsche Tennis Grand Prix =

- Date: 22–29 April
- Edition: 41st
- Category: Premier
- Draw: 28S / 16D
- Prize money: $816,000
- Surface: Clay (indoor)
- Location: Stuttgart, Germany
- Venue: Porsche-Arena

Champions

Singles
- (Czech Republic) Karolína Plíšková

Doubles
- (United States) Raquel Atawo / (Germany) Anna-Lena Grönefeld
- Porsche Tennis Grand Prix

The 2018 Porsche Tennis Grand Prix was a women's tennis tournament played on indoor clay courts. It was the 41st edition of the Porsche Tennis Grand Prix, and part of the Premier tournaments of the 2018 WTA Tour. It took place at the Porsche Arena in Stuttgart, Germany, from 23 April until 29 April 2018. Fifth-seeded Karolína Plíšková won the singles title.

== Finals ==
=== Singles ===
- (Czech Republic) Karolína Plíšková defeated (United States) CoCo Vandeweghe, 7–6^{(7–2)}, 6–4

=== Doubles ===
- (United States) Raquel Atawo / (Germany) Anna-Lena Grönefeld defeated (United States) Nicole Melichar / (Czech Republic) Květa Peschke, 6–4, 6–7^{(5–7)}, [10–5]

== Points and prize money ==
=== Point distribution ===
Event	W	F	SF	QF	Round of 16	Round of 32	Q	Q3	Q2	Q1
Singles	470	305	185	100	55	1	25	18	13	1
Doubles	470	305	185	100	1	—N/a	—N/a	—N/a	—N/a	—N/a

=== Prize money ===
Event	W	F	SF	QF	Round of 16	Round of 32	Q3	Q2	Q1
Singles	€107,036	€57,157	€30,536	€16,411	€8,798	€5,585	€2,508	€1,333	€742
Doubles *	€33,482	€17,885	€9,774	€4,974	€2,702	—N/a	—N/a	—N/a	—N/a

_{* per team}

== Singles main draw entrants ==
=== Seeds ===
Country		Rank^{1}	Seed
ROU	Simona Halep	1	1
ESP	Garbiñe Muguruza	3	2
UKR	Elina Svitolina	4	3
LAT	Jeļena Ostapenko	5	4
CZE	Karolína Plíšková	6	5
FRA	Caroline Garcia	7	6
USA	Sloane Stephens	9	7
CZE	Petra Kvitová	10	8

- ^{1} Rankings are as of 16 April 2018.

=== Other entrants ===
The following players received wildcards into the main draw:

- (Germany) Antonia Lottner
- (Russia) Maria Sharapova
- (Germany) Laura Siegemund
- (United States) CoCo Vandeweghe

The following players received entry from the qualifying draw:

- (Kazakhstan) Zarina Diyas
- (Ukraine) Marta Kostyuk
- (Russia) Veronika Kudermetova
- (Czech Republic) Markéta Vondroušová

The following player received entry as a lucky loser:

- (Germany) Carina Witthöft

=== Withdrawals ===
Before the tournament

- (Latvia) Anastasija Sevastova →replaced by (Germany) Carina Witthöft

=== Retirements ===
- (Germany) Angelique Kerber
- (Spain) Garbiñe Muguruza
- (Czech Republic) Markéta Vondroušová

== Doubles main draw entrants ==
=== Seeds ===
Country	Player	Country	Player	Rank^{1}	Seed
SLO	Andreja Klepač	ESP	María José Martínez Sánchez	34	1
RUS	Alla Kudryavtseva	CZE	Andrea Sestini Hlaváčková	42	2
NED	Kiki Bertens	NED	Demi Schuurs	45	3
USA	Raquel Atawo	GER	Anna-Lena Grönefeld	59	4

- ^{1} Rankings as of April 16, 2018.

=== Other entrants ===
The following pair received a wildcard into the main draw:

- (Germany) Antonia Lottner / (Germany) Lena Rüffer
