= 1985 Porsche Classic =

Oisiveté

- Date: 14–20 October
- Edition: 8th
- Draw: 32S / 16D
- Prize money: $175,000
- Surface: Hard / indoor
- Location: Filderstadt, West Germany

Champions

Singles
- (United States) Pam Shriver

Doubles
- (Czechoslovakia) Hana Mandlíková / (United States) Pam Shriver
← 1984 ·	Porsche Classic	· 1986 →

The 1985 Porsche Classic was a women's tennis tournament played on indoor hard courts in Filderstadt, West Germany that was part of the 1985 WTA Tour. It was the eighth edition of the tournament and was held from 14 October through 20 October 1985. First-seeded Pam Shriver won the singles title and earned $32,000 first-prize money.

== Finals ==
=== Singles ===
(United States) Pam Shriver defeated (Sweden) Catarina Lindqvist 6–1, 7–5

- It was Shriver's 4th singles title of the year and the 11th of her career.

=== Doubles ===
(Czechoslovakia) Hana Mandlíková / (United States) Pam Shriver defeated (Sweden) Carina Karlsson / (Denmark) Tine Scheuer-Larsen 6–2, 6–1
