= 1982 Porsche Tennis Grand Prix – Singles =

Singles
- 1982 Porsche Tennis Grand Prix

Final
- Champion: (United States) Martina Navratilova
- Runner-up: (United States) Tracy Austin
- Score: 6–3, 6–3

Details
- Draw: 32 (4Q)
- Seeds: 8

Events
Singles	Doubles
- Women's Stuttgart Open

Four-time defending champion Tracy Austin lost in the final to Martina Navratilova. The score was 6–3, 6–3.

This was the first ever professional tournament for future 22-time major champion and world No. 1 Steffi Graf, at the age of 13. She faced Austin in the first round, losing 6–4, 6–0.

== Seeds ==
1. (United States) Martina Navratilova (champion)
2. (United States) Tracy Austin (final)
3. (United States) Pam Shriver (quarterfinals)
4. (Czechoslovakia) Hana Mandlíková (second round)
5. (West Germany) Bettina Bunge (first round)
6. (West Germany) Sylvia Hanika (semifinals)
7. (Socialist Federal Republic of Yugoslavia) Mima Jaušovec (semifinals)
8. (United States) Anne Smith (first round)

== Draw ==
Key

- Q = Qualifier
- WC = Wild card
- LL = Lucky loser
- Alt = Alternate
- ITF = ITF entry
- PR = Protected ranking
- SR = Special ranking
- SE = Special exempt
- JE = Junior exempt
- JR = Junior Accelerator Programme entrant
- CO = College Accelerator Programme entrant
- NG = Next Gen Accelerator Program entrant
- w/o = Walkover
- r = Retired
- d = Defaulted

=== Finals ===
Semifinals
1	(United States) Martina Navratilova	6	6
7	(Socialist Federal Republic of Yugoslavia) Mima Jaušovec	0	0
6	(West Germany) Sylvia Hanika	4	4
2	(United States) Tracy Austin	6	6

Final
1	(United States) Martina Navratilova	6	6
2	(United States) Tracy Austin	3	3

=== Top half ===
First round
1	(United States) M Navratilova	6	6
(Switzerland) P Delhees	0	0
(France) C Tanvier	7	6
(United States) Z Garrison	6	4
Q	(Brazil) P Medrado	6	6
(Italy) S Simmonds	2	3
(West Germany) C Kohde-Kilsch	6	7
5	(West Germany) B Bunge	4	6
4	(Czechoslovakia) H Mandlíková	6	6
(Netherlands) B Stöve	3	2
(United Kingdom) J Durie	6	6
Q	(Czechoslovakia) K Skronská	3	4
(Hungary) A Temesvári	6	6
(South Korea) D-h Lee	2	3
(United States) S Collins	4	2
7	(Socialist Federal Republic of Yugoslavia) M Jaušovec	6	6

Second round
1	(United States) M Navratilova	6	6
(France) C Tanvier	3	2
Q	(Brazil) P Medrado	6	5	6
(West Germany) C Kohde-Kilsch	1	7	3
4	(Czechoslovakia) H Mandlíková	6	4
(United Kingdom) J Durie	7	6
(Hungary) A Temesvári	2	6	3
7	(Socialist Federal Republic of Yugoslavia) M Jaušovec	6	2	6

Quarterfinals
1	(United States) M Navratilova	6	6
Q	(Brazil) P Medrado	1	2
(United Kingdom) J Durie	1	4
7	(Socialist Federal Republic of Yugoslavia) M Jaušovec	6	6

Semifinals
1	(United States) M Navratilova	6	6
7	(Socialist Federal Republic of Yugoslavia) M Jaušovec	0	0

=== Bottom half ===
First round
6	(West Germany) S Hanika	7	6	7
(West Germany) F Pfaff	5	7	5
(United States) K Horvath	7	2	5
(United States) J Russell	6	6	7
Q	(Czechoslovakia) I Budařová	7	3	7
Q	(Netherlands) M Mesker	6	6	5
(South Africa) R Fairbank	3	2
3	(United States) P Shriver	6	6
8	(United States) A Smith	0	2
(United States) LA Thompson	6	6
(United States) C Reynolds	6	6	2
(Czechoslovakia) H Suková	7	2	6
(Romania) V Ruzici	7	6
(United States) A Leand	6	2
(West Germany) S Graf	4	0
2	(United States) T Austin	6	6

Second round
6	(West Germany) S Hanika	4	6	6
(United States) J Russell	6	3	4
Q	(Czechoslovakia) I Budařová	0	2
3	(United States) P Shriver	6	6
(United States) LA Thompson	6	4
(Czechoslovakia) H Suková	7	6
(Romania) V Ruzici	4	5
2	(United States) T Austin	6	7

Quarterfinals
6	(West Germany) S Hanika	6	2	6
3	(United States) P Shriver	1	6	2
(Czechoslovakia) H Suková	6	3	1
2	(United States) T Austin	4	6	6

Semifinals
6	(West Germany) S Hanika	4	4
2	(United States) T Austin	6	6
