= 1995 Porsche Tennis Grand Prix – Singles =

Singles
- 1995 Porsche Tennis Grand Prix
- 1994 Champion: (Germany) Anke Huber

Final
- Champion: (Croatia) Iva Majoli
- Runner-up: (Argentina) Gabriela Sabatini
- Score: 6–4, 7–6^{(7–4)}

Details
- Draw: 28
- Seeds: 8

Events
Singles	Doubles
← 1994 ·	Women's Stuttgart Open	· 1996 →

Anke Huber was the defending champion, but lost in semifinals to Gabriela Sabatini.

Iva Majoli won the title, defeating Sabatini 6–4, 7–6^{(7–4)} in the final.

== Seeds ==
1. (Spain) Conchita Martínez (second round)
2. (France) Mary Pierce (quarterfinals)
3. (Argentina) Gabriela Sabatini (final)
4. (United States) Lindsay Davenport (second round)
5. (Germany) Anke Huber (semifinals)
6. (Belarus) Natasha Zvereva (quarterfinals)
7. (Croatia) Iva Majoli (champion)
8. (Netherlands) Brenda Schultz-McCarthy (quarterfinals)

== Draw ==
=== Key ===
- Q = Qualifier
- WC = Wild card
- LL = Lucky loser
- Alt = Alternate
- SE = Special exempt
- PR = Protected ranking
- ITF = ITF entry
- JE = Junior exempt
- w/o = Walkover
- r = Retired
- d = Defaulted
- SR = Special ranking

=== Finals ===
Semifinals
5	(Germany) Anke Huber	4	1
3	(Argentina) Gabriela Sabatini	6	6
(United States) Chanda Rubin	4	6	6^{2}
7	(Croatia) Iva Majoli	6	1	7^{7}

Final
3	(Argentina) Gabriela Sabatini	4	6^{4}
7	(Croatia) Iva Majoli	6	7^{7}

=== Top half ===
First round
Q	(Germany) P Begerow	6	7^{7}
Q	(Germany) M Kochta	1	6^{2}
(France) N Tauziat	6	3	6
(United States) Z Garrison Jackson	0	6	3
(United States) M Werdel-Witmeyer	2	1
5	(Germany) A Huber	6	6
(France) J Halard	7	6
WC	(Germany) M Weingärtner	5	1
Q	(United States) M McGrath	6	7
(United States) L McNeil	1	5
(United States) L Raymond	4	5
8	(Netherlands) B Schultz-McCarthy	6	7

Second round
1	(Spain) C Martínez	4	3
Q	(Germany) P Begerow	6	6
(France) N Tauziat	6	1	4
5	(Germany) A Huber	3	6	6
3	(Argentina) G Sabatini	7^{7}	6
(France) J Halard	6^{2}	2
Q	(United States) M McGrath	6	3	3
8	(Netherlands) B Schultz-McCarthy	3	6	6

Quarterfinals
Q	(Germany) P Begerow	3	2
5	(Germany) A Huber	6	6
3	(Argentina) G Sabatini	6	6
8	(Netherlands) B Schultz-McCarthy	2	1

Semifinals
5	(Germany) A Huber	4	1
3	(Argentina) G Sabatini	6	6

=== Bottom half ===
First round
6	(Belarus) N Zvereva	6	6
(Switzerland) M Hingis	4	4
(South Africa) A Coetzer	6	4	2
(Netherlands) M Oremans	1	6	6
WC	(Germany) J Kandarr	1	1
(United States) C Rubin	6	6
7	(Croatia) I Majoli	6	6
(United States) G Fernández	4	4
Q	(Latvia) L Neiland	6	5	4
(Russia) E Likhovtseva	3	7	6
(Germany) S Hack	4	1
(Belgium) S Appelmans	6	6

Second round
6	(Belarus) N Zvereva	4	7	7^{10}
(Netherlands) M Oremans	6	5	6^{8}
(United States) C Rubin	4	6	6
4	(United States) L Davenport	6	2	4
7	(Croatia) I Majoli	6	7^{8}
(Russia) E Likhovtseva	1	6^{6}
(Belgium) S Appelmans	2	3
2	(France) M Pierce	6	6

Quarterfinals
6	(Belarus) N Zvereva	5	5
(United States) C Rubin	7	7
7	(Croatia) I Majoli	2	6	6
2	(France) M Pierce	6	3	2

Semifinals
(United States) C Rubin	4	6	6^{2}
7	(Croatia) I Majoli	6	1	7^{7}
