= 1997 Porsche Tennis Grand Prix – Singles =

Singles
- 1997 Porsche Tennis Grand Prix

Final
- Champion: (Switzerland) Martina Hingis
- Runner-up: (United States) Lisa Raymond
- Score: 6–4, 6–2

Details
- Draw: 28 (2WC / 4Q)
- Seeds: 8

Events
Singles	Doubles
← 1996 ·	Porsche Tennis Grand Prix	· 1998 →

Martina Hingis was the defending champion, and successfully defended her title, defeating Lisa Raymond in the final 6–4, 6–2.

== Seeds ==
A champion seed is indicated in bold text while text in italics indicates the round in which that seed was eliminated. The top four seeds received a bye to the second round.

1. (Switzerland) **Martina Hingis (champion)**
2. (Czech Republic) Jana Novotná (second round)
3. (Croatia) Iva Majoli (second round)
4. (United States) Lindsay Davenport (second round)
5. (South Africa) Amanda Coetzer (semifinals)
6. (Germany) Anke Huber (first round)
7. n/a
8. (Romania) Irina Spîrlea (semifinals)

== Draw ==
=== Key ===
- Q = Qualifier
- WC = Wild card
- LL = Lucky loser
- Alt = Alternate
- ITF = ITF entry
- PR = Protected ranking
- SR = Special ranking
- SE = Special exempt
- JE = Junior exempt
- JR = Junior Accelerator Programme entrant
- CO = College Accelerator Programme entrant
- NG = Next Gen Accelerator Program entrant
- w/o = Walkover
- r = Retired
- d = Defaulted

=== Final ===
Semifinals
1	(Switzerland) **Martina Hingis**	**6**	**6**
5	(South Africa) Amanda Coetzer	2	1
8	(Romania) Irina Spîrlea	3	1
(United States) **Lisa Raymond**	**6**	**6**

Final
1	(Switzerland) **Martina Hingis**	**6**	**6**
(United States) Lisa Raymond	4	2

=== Section 1 ===
First round
(Belarus) **N Zvereva**	**6**	**6**
WC	(Spain) C Martínez	1	0
Q	(Italy) **R Grande**	**7**	**6**
(France) S Testud	6	3
(Bulgaria) **M Maleeva**	6	**6**	**6**
LL	(France) A-G Sidot	**7**	4	3
(Czech Republic) H Suková	6	2
Q	(Switzerland) **P Schnyder**	**7**	**6**
Q	(Austria) B Schett	3	6
WC	(Russia) **A Kournikova**	**6**	**7**
(Netherlands) B Schultz-McCarthy	6	3
5	(South Africa) **A Coetzer**	**7**	**6**

Second round
1	(Switzerland) **M Hingis**	4	**6**	**6**
(Belarus) N Zvereva	**6**	1	4
Q	(Italy) R Grande	2	3
(Bulgaria) **M Maleeva**	**6**	**6**
3	(Croatia) I Majoli	2	2
Q	(Switzerland) **P Schnyder**	**6**	**6**
WC	(Russia) A Kournikova	**6**	3	4
5	(South Africa) **A Coetzer**	3	**6**	**6**

Quarterfinals
1	(Switzerland) **M Hingis**	**6**	**6**
(Bulgaria) M Maleeva	2	3
Q	(Switzerland) P Schnyder	2	5
5	(South Africa) **A Coetzer**	**6**	**7**

Semifinals
1	(Switzerland) **M Hingis**	**6**	**6**
5	(South Africa) A Coetzer	2	1

=== Section 2 ===
First round
8	(Romania) **I Spîrlea**	**6**	**6**
(Romania) R Dragomir	2	0
(United States) J Capriati	2	1
(Slovakia) **K Habšudová**	**6**	**6**
(Austria) J Wiesner	2	5
(Spain) **A Sánchez Vicario**	**6**	**7**
6	(Germany) A Huber	4	4
(United States) **M J Fernández**	**6**	**6**
(Japan) **N Sawamatsu**	**6**	**6**
(Belgium) S Appelmans	3	2
Q	(Italy) S Farina	3	2
(United States) **L Raymond**	**6**	**6**

Second round
8	(Romania) **I Spîrlea**	**6**	**6**
(Slovakia) K Habšudová	2	0
(Spain) **A Sánchez Vicario**	**6**	**7**
4	(United States) L Davenport	4	6
(United States) M J Fernández	2	**6**	3
(Japan) **N Sawamatsu**	**6**	0	**6**
(United States) **L Raymond**	3	**6**	**6**
2	(Czech Republic) J Novotná	**6**	4	4

Quarterfinals
8	(Romania) **I Spîrlea**	**7**	**6**
(Spain) A Sánchez Vicario	5	4
(Japan) N Sawamatsu	2	3
(United States) **L Raymond**	**6**	**6**

Semifinals
8	(Romania) I Spîrlea	3	1
(United States) **L Raymond**	**6**	**6**
