= 1994 Porsche Tennis Grand Prix – Singles =

Singles
- 1994 Porsche Tennis Grand Prix

Final
- Champion: (Germany) Anke Huber
- Runner-up: (France) Mary Pierce
- Score: 6–4, 6–2

Details
- Draw: 32 (2WC/4Q)
- Seeds: 8

Events
Singles	Doubles
← 1993 ·	Women's Stuttgart Open	· 1995 →

Mary Pierce was the defending champion, but lost in the final to Anke Huber. The score was 6–4, 6–2.

== Seeds ==
1. (Spain) Conchita Martínez (quarterfinals)
2. (United States) Martina Navratilova (quarterfinals)
3. (France) Mary Pierce (final)
4. (Argentina) Gabriela Sabatini (first round)
5. (Belarus) Natasha Zvereva (first round)
6. (United States) Zina Garrison Jackson (first round)
7. (South Africa) Amanda Coetzer (second round)
8. (Germany) Anke Huber (champion)

== Draw ==
=== Key ===
- Q = Qualifier
- WC = Wild card
- LL = Lucky loser
- Alt = Alternate
- SE = Special exempt
- PR = Protected ranking
- ITF = ITF entry
- JE = Junior exempt
- w/o = Walkover
- r = Retired
- d = Defaulted
- SR = Special ranking

=== Finals ===
Semifinals
Q	(Slovakia) Karina Habšudová	4	1
3	(France) Mary Pierce	6	6
Q	(United States) Marianne Werdel	6	2	3
8	(Germany) Anke Huber	4	6	6

Final
3	(France) Mary Pierce	4	2
8	(Germany) Anke Huber	6	6

=== Top half ===
First round
1	(Spain) C Martínez	7	6
(Bulgaria) K Maleeva	5	2
(Georgia (country)) L Meskhi	6	6
Q	(United States) K Po	1	2
(Canada) P Hy	3	1
Q	(Slovakia) K Habšudová	6	6
(Netherlands) B Schultz	6	6
6	(United States) Z Garrison Jackson	2	3
3	(France) M Pierce	6	6
(Ukraine) N Medvedeva	3	2
(United States) C Rubin	3	7	7
(Romania) I Spîrlea	6	5	5
(Austria) J Wiesner	6	3	6^{3}
(United States) G Fernández	4	6	7^{7}
(United States) P Fendick	6	4	3
7	(South Africa) A Coetzer	3	6	6

Second round
1	(Spain) C Martínez	6	6
(Georgia (country)) L Meskhi	2	3
Q	(Slovakia) K Habšudová	6	6
(Netherlands) B Schultz	0	2
3	(France) M Pierce	7	7^{8}
(United States) C Rubin	5	6^{6}
(United States) G Fernández	7	6
7	(South Africa) A Coetzer	5	4

Quarterfinals
1	(Spain) C Martínez	4	1
Q	(Slovakia) K Habšudová	6	6
3	(France) M Pierce	6	6
(United States) G Fernández	0	1

Semifinals
Q	(Slovakia) K Habšudová	4	1
3	(France) M Pierce	6	6

=== Bottom half ===
First round
5	(Belarus) N Zvereva	6	2	6^{7}
Q	(United States) M Werdel	2	6	7^{9}
(United States) M McGrath	5	2
(France) N Tauziat	7	6
WC	(Switzerland) M Hingis	6	6
(Czech Republic) H Suková	2	1
WC	(Germany) C Singer	3	7	6
4	(Argentina) G Sabatini	6	5	1
8	(Germany) A Huber	6	4	6
(Germany) B Rittner	3	6	4
(France) J Halard	6	1	6
(Argentina) F Labat	4	6	0
(United States) L McNeil	1	6	6
Q	(Australia) M Jaggard-Lai	6	1	0
(United States) A Grossman	4	6	0
2	(United States) M Navratilova	6	3	6

Second round
Q	(United States) M Werdel	6	6
(France) N Tauziat	4	3
WC	(Switzerland) M Hingis	6	6
WC	(Germany) C Singer	1	4
8	(Germany) A Huber	6	6
(France) J Halard	1	1
(United States) L McNeil	7	6^{7}	4
2	(United States) M Navratilova	5	7^{9}	6

Quarterfinals
Q	(United States) M Werdel	0	6	7^{7}
WC	(Switzerland) M Hingis	6	2	6^{5}
8	(Germany) A Huber	6	3	6
2	(United States) M Navratilova	3	6	4

Semifinals
Q	(United States) M Werdel	6	2	3
8	(Germany) A Huber	4	6	6
