= 2001 Porsche Tennis Grand Prix – Doubles =

Doubles
- 2001 Porsche Tennis Grand Prix

Final
- Champions: (United States) Lindsay Davenport (United States) Lisa Raymond
- Runners-up: (Belgium) Justine Henin (United States) Meghann Shaughnessy
- Score: 6–4, 6–7^{(4–7)}, 7–5

Details
- Draw: 16 (1WC/1Q)
- Seeds: 4

Events
Singles	Doubles
← 2000 ·	Women's Stuttgart Open	· 2002 →

Martina Hingis and Anna Kournikova were the defending champions, but withdrew before their semifinal match against Justine Henin and Meghann Shaughnessy.

Lindsay Davenport and Lisa Raymond won the title, defeating Henin and Shaughnessy in the final 6–4, 6–7^{(4–7)}, 7–5.

== Seeds ==
1. (United States) Kimberly Po-Messerli / (France) Nathalie Tauziat (second round)
2. (Zimbabwe) Cara Black / (Russia) Elena Likhovtseva (first round)
3. (Switzerland) Martina Hingis / (Russia) Anna Kournikova (semifinals, withdrew)
4. (Belgium) Kim Clijsters / (Austria) Barbara Schett (semifinals)

== Draw ==
=== Key ===
- Q = Qualifier
- WC = Wild card
- LL = Lucky loser
- Alt = Alternate
- SE = Special exempt
- PR = Protected ranking
- ITF = ITF entry
- JE = Junior exempt
- w/o = Walkover
- r = Retired
- d = Defaulted
- SR = Special ranking

=== Draw ===
First round
1	(United States) K Po-Messerli (France) N Tauziat	6	6
(Sweden) Å Carlsson (Netherlands) M Oremans	2	3
(Belgium) J Henin (United States) M Shaughnessy	6	5	6
(South Africa) A Coetzer (United States) L McNeil	2	7	4
3	(Switzerland) M Hingis (Russia) A Kournikova	6	6
(United States) M Navratilova (Spain) A Sánchez Vicario	3	4
(Slovakia) D Hantuchová (France) S Testud	4	1
(Czech Republic) K Hrdličková (Germany) B Rittner	6	6
WC	(United States) J Capriati (United States) C Rubin	7	6
Q	(Argentina) L Montalvo (Spain) M Serna	5	4
(Italy) T Garbin (Slovakia) J Husárová	3	0
4	(Belgium) K Clijsters (Austria) B Schett	6	6
(Slovakia) K Habšudová (Ukraine) E Tatarkova	3	7	3
(France) A-G Sidot (Netherlands) C Vis	6	5	6
(United States) L Davenport (United States) L Raymond	6	6
2	(Zimbabwe) C Black (Russia) E Likhovtseva	4	2

Quarterfinals
1	(United States) K Po-Messerli (France) N Tauziat	4	6^{6}
(Belgium) J Henin (United States) M Shaughnessy	6	7^{8}
3	(Switzerland) M Hingis (Russia) A Kournikova	6	6
(Czech Republic) K Hrdličková (Germany) B Rittner	2	2
WC	(United States) J Capriati (United States) C Rubin	2	4
4	(Belgium) K Clijsters (Austria) B Schett	6	6
(France) A-G Sidot (Netherlands) C Vis	1	3
(United States) L Davenport (United States) L Raymond	6	6

Semifinals
(Belgium) J Henin (United States) M Shaughnessy	w/o
3	(Switzerland) M Hingis (Russia) A Kournikova
4	(Belgium) K Clijsters (Austria) B Schett	2	1
(United States) L Davenport (United States) L Raymond	6	6

Final
(Belgium) J Henin (United States) M Shaughnessy	4	7^{7}	5
(United States) L Davenport (United States) L Raymond	6	6^{4}	7
