= 1994 Porsche Tennis Grand Prix =

- Date: 10–16 October
- Edition: 17th
- Category: Tier II
- Draw: 32S / 16D
- Prize money: $400,000
- Surface: Hard (Greenset) / indoor
- Location: Filderstadt, Germany
- Venue: Filderstadt Tennis Centre

Champions

Singles
- (Germany) Anke Huber

Doubles
- (United States) Gigi Fernández / (Belarus) Natasha Zvereva
← 1993 ·	Porsche Tennis Grand Prix	· 1995 →

The 1994 Porsche Tennis Grand Prix was a women's tennis tournament played on indoor hard courts at the Filderstadt Tennis Centre in Filderstadt, Germany and was part of the Tier II of the 1994 WTA Tour. It was the 17th edition of the tournament and was held from 10 October to 16 October 1994. Eighth-seeded Anke Huber won the singles title and earned $80,000 first-prize money as well as 300 ranking points.

== Finals ==
=== Singles ===
(Germany) Anke Huber defeated (France) Mary Pierce 6–4, 6–2

- It was Huber's 2nd singles title of the year and the 5th of her career.

=== Doubles ===
(United States) Gigi Fernández / (Belarus) Natasha Zvereva defeated (Netherlands) Manon Bollegraf / (Latvia) Larisa Neiland 7–6^{(7–5)}, 6–4

== Prize money ==
Event		W	F	SF	QF	Round of 16	Round of 32
Singles	Prize money	$80,000	$36,000	$18,000	$9,000	$4,500	$2,400
