= 1984 Porsche Grand Prix =

- Date: 15–21 October
- Edition: 7th
- Draw: 32S / 16D
- Prize money: $150,000
- Surface: Hard (Greenset) / indoors
- Location: Filderstadt, West Germany

Champions

Singles
- (Sweden) Catarina Lindqvist

Doubles
- (West Germany) Claudia Kohde-Kilsch (Czechoslovakia) Helena Suková
← 1983 ·	Porsche Grand Prix	· 1985 →

The 1984 Porsche Grand Prix was a women's tennis tournament played on indoor hard courts in Filderstadt, West Germany that was part of the 1984 Virginia Slims World Championship Series. It was the seventh edition of the tournament and was held from 15 October until 21 October 1984. Unseeded Catarina Lindqvist won the singles title.

== Finals ==
=== Singles ===
(Sweden) Catarina Lindqvist defeated (West Germany) Steffi Graf 6–1, 6–4

- It was Lindqvist's 2nd singles title of the year and of her career.

=== Doubles ===
(West Germany) Claudia Kohde-Kilsch / (Czechoslovakia) Helena Suková defeated (West Germany) Bettina Bunge / (West Germany) Eva Pfaff 6–2, 4–6, 6–3

- It was Kohde-Kilsch's 4th title of the year and the 10th of her career. It was Suková's 3rd title of the year and the 4th of her career.
