= 2002 Porsche Tennis Grand Prix – Doubles =

Doubles
- 2002 Porsche Tennis Grand Prix

Final
- Champions: (United States) Lindsay Davenport (United States) Lisa Raymond
- Runners-up: (United States) Meghann Shaughnessy (Argentina) Paola Suárez
- Score: 6–2, 6–4

Details
- Draw: 16 (2WC/1Q/1LL/1PR)
- Seeds: 4

Events
Singles	Doubles
← 2001 ·	Women's Stuttgart Open	· 2003 →

Lindsay Davenport and Lisa Raymond were the defending champions and successfully defended their title, by defeating Meghann Shaughnessy and Paola Suárez 6–2, 6–4 in the final.

== Seeds ==
1. (Slovakia) Daniela Hantuchová / (Spain) Arantxa Sánchez Vicario (first round)
2. (United States) Meghann Shaughnessy / (Argentina) Paola Suárez (final)
3. (United States) Nicole Arendt / (South Africa) Liezel Huber (first round)
4. (Belgium) Kim Clijsters / (United States) Chanda Rubin (first round)

== Draw ==
=== Key ===
- Q = Qualifier
- WC = Wild card
- LL = Lucky loser
- Alt = Alternate
- SE = Special exempt
- PR = Protected ranking
- ITF = ITF entry
- JE = Junior exempt
- w/o = Walkover
- r = Retired
- d = Defaulted
- SR = Special ranking

=== Draw ===
First round
1	(Slovakia) D Hantuchová (Spain) A Sánchez Vicario	1	0
PR	(United States) L Davenport (United States) L Raymond	6	6
(Italy) T Garbin (Slovakia) H Nagyová	6	7^{7}
(Croatia) I Majoli (Austria) B Schett	2	6^{3}
4	(Belgium) K Clijsters (United States) C Rubin	7^{7}	5	2
WC	(Belgium) J Henin (France) A Mauresmo	6^{2}	7	6
(Italy) S Farina Elia (Sweden) Å Svensson	6	7
LL	(Russia) T Panova (Belarus) T Poutchek	2	5
(Hungary) P Mandula (Austria) P Wartusch	7^{8}	6
WC	(Australia) C Barclay (Germany) M Müller	6^{6}	3
Q	(Switzerland) M Casanova (Russia) A Myskina	6	3	7^{7}
3	(United States) N Arendt (South Africa) L Huber	1	6	6^{5}
(Federal Republic of Yugoslavia) J Dokic (Russia) N Petrova	7^{10}	6^{5}	6
(United States) K Po-Messerli (Belarus) N Zvereva	6^{8}	7^{7}	4
(Germany) B Rittner (Netherlands) C Vis	3	2
2	(United States) M Shaughnessy (Argentina) P Suárez	6	6

Quarterfinals
PR	(United States) L Davenport (United States) L Raymond	6	6
(Italy) T Garbin (Slovakia) H Nagyová	3	3
WC	(Belgium) J Henin (France) A Mauresmo	7	6
(Italy) S Farina Elia (Sweden) Å Svensson	5	1
(Hungary) P Mandula (Austria) P Wartusch	w/o
Q	(Switzerland) M Casanova (Russia) A Myskina
(Federal Republic of Yugoslavia) J Dokic (Russia) N Petrova	3	1
2	(United States) M Shaughnessy (Argentina) P Suárez	6	6

Semifinals
PR	(United States) L Davenport (United States) L Raymond	6	6
WC	(Belgium) J Henin (France) A Mauresmo	1	3
(Hungary) P Mandula (Austria) P Wartusch	1	4
2	(United States) M Shaughnessy (Argentina) P Suárez	6	6

Final
PR	(United States) L Davenport (United States) L Raymond	6	6
2	(United States) M Shaughnessy (Argentina) P Suárez	2	4
