= 1997 Porsche Tennis Grand Prix =

- Date: 6–12 October
- Edition: 20th
- Category: Tier II
- Draw: 28S / 16D
- Prize money: $450,000
- Surface: Hard (Greenset) / indoor
- Location: Filderstadt, Germany
- Venue: Filderstadt Tennis Club

Champions

Singles
- (Switzerland) Martina Hingis

Doubles
- (Switzerland) Martina Hingis; (Spain) Arantxa Sánchez Vicario
- Porsche Tennis Grand Prix

The 1997 Porsche Tennis Grand Prix was a women's tennis tournament played on indoor hard courts at the Filderstadt Tennis Club in Filderstadt in Germany that was part of the Tier II category of the 1997 WTA Tour. It was the 20th edition of the tournament and was held from 6 October through 12 October 1997. First-seeded Martina Hingis won the singles title, her second consecutive at the event.

== Finals ==
=== Singles ===
(Switzerland) Martina Hingis defeated (United States) Lisa Raymond 6–4, 6–2

- It was Hingis' 11th singles title of the year and the 13th of her career.

=== Doubles ===
(Switzerland) Martina Hingis / (Spain) Arantxa Sánchez Vicario defeated (United States) Lindsay Davenport / (Czech Republic) Jana Novotná 7–6^{(7–4)}, 3–6, 7–6^{(7–3)}

- It was Hingis' 7th doubles title of the year and the 10th of her career. It was Sánchez Vicario's 5th doubles title of the year and the 54th of her career.
