= 2000 Porsche Tennis Grand Prix =

- Date: 2–8 October
- Edition: 23rd
- Category: Tier II
- Draw: 28S / 16D
- Prize money: $535,000
- Surface: Hard / indoor
- Location: Filderstadt, Germany
- Venue: Filderstadt Tennis Club

Champions

Singles
- (Switzerland) Martina Hingis

Doubles
- (Switzerland) Martina Hingis (Russia) Anna Kournikova
- Porsche Tennis Grand Prix

The 2000 Porsche Tennis Grand Prix was a women's tennis tournament played on indoor hard courts at the Filderstadt Tennis Club in Filderstadt, Germany that was part of Tier II of the 2000 WTA Tour. It was the 23rd edition of the tournament and was held from 2 October until 8 October 2000. First-seeded Martina Hingis won the singles title and earned $87,000 first-prize money.

== Finals ==
=== Singles ===
(Switzerland) Martina Hingis defeated (Belgium) Kim Clijsters 6–0, 6–3

- It was Hingis' 6th singles title of the year and the 32nd of her career.

=== Doubles ===
(Switzerland) Martina Hingis / (Russia) Anna Kournikova defeated (Spain) Arantxa Sánchez Vicario / (Austria) Barbara Schett 6–4, 6–2

== Prize money ==
Event	W	F	SF	QF	Round of 16	Round of 32
Singles	$87,000	$43,500	$21,750	$11,000	$7,600	$4,000
