= 2003 Porsche Tennis Grand Prix – Doubles =

Doubles
- 2003 Porsche Tennis Grand Prix

Final
- Champions: (United States) Lisa Raymond (Australia) Rennae Stubbs
- Runners-up: (Zimbabwe) Cara Black (United States) Martina Navratilova
- Score: 6–2, 6–4

Events
Singles	Doubles
← 2002 ·	Women's Stuttgart Open	· 2004 →

Lindsay Davenport and Lisa Raymond were the defending champions, but Davenport did not compete this year in order to focus on the singles tournament.

Raymond teamed up with Rennae Stubbs and won the title by defeating Cara Black and Martina Navratilova 6–2, 6–4 in the final.

== Seeds ==
1. (Zimbabwe) Cara Black / (United States) Martina Navratilova (final)
2. (United States) Lisa Raymond / (Australia) Rennae Stubbs (champions)
3. (Spain) Conchita Martínez / (Argentina) Paola Suárez (quarterfinals)
4. (South Africa) Liezel Huber / (Bulgaria) Magdalena Maleeva (quarterfinals)

== Draw ==
=== Key ===
- Q = Qualifier
- WC = Wild card
- LL = Lucky loser
- Alt = Alternate
- ITF = ITF entry
- PR = Protected ranking
- SR = Special ranking
- SE = Special exempt
- JE = Junior exempt
- JR = Junior Accelerator Programme entrant
- CO = College Accelerator Programme entrant
- NG = Next Gen Accelerator Program entrant
- w/o = Walkover
- r = Retired
- d = Defaulted

=== Draw ===
First round
1	(Zimbabwe) C Black (United States) M Navratilova	7	4	6
WC	(France) A Mauresmo (France) M Pierce	5	6	2
Q	(Germany) AL Grönefeld (Germany) L Steinbach	4	3
(Russia) E Bovina (Belgium) E Callens	6	6
4	(South Africa) L Huber (Bulgaria) M Maleeva	6	6^{3}	6
(Slovakia) D Hantuchová (Germany) B Rittner	1	7^{7}	1
WC	(Russia) A Myskina (Russia) V Zvonareva	4	3
(Russia) N Petrova (United States) M Shaughnessy	6	6
(France) M Bartoli (Switzerland) M Casanova	7^{7}	6
LL	(France) S Cohen-Aloro (France) C Dhenin	6^{5}	3
(Greece) E Daniilidou (Italy) R Grande	3	2
3	(Spain) C Martínez (Argentina) P Suárez	6	6
(Federal Republic of Yugoslavia) J Dokic (Slovenia) M Matevžič	5	1
(Austria) B Schett (Switzerland) P Schnyder	7	6
(Spain) M Serna (Australia) A Molik	4	2
2	(United States) L Raymond (Australia) R Stubbs	6	6

Quarterfinals
1	(Zimbabwe) C Black (United States) M Navratilova	6	6
(Russia) E Bovina (Belgium) E Callens	4	3
4	(South Africa) L Huber (Bulgaria) M Maleeva	4	2
(Russia) N Petrova (United States) M Shaughnessy	6	6
(France) M Bartoli (Switzerland) M Casanova	6	6^{3}	7
3	(Spain) C Martínez (Argentina) P Suárez	3	7^{7}	5
(Austria) B Schett (Switzerland) P Schnyder	6	6^{5}	4
2	(United States) L Raymond (Australia) R Stubbs	3	7^{7}	6

Semifinals
1	(Zimbabwe) C Black (United States) M Navratilova	7^{7}	6
(Russia) N Petrova (United States) M Shaughnessy	6^{4}	4
(France) M Bartoli (Switzerland) M Casanova
2	(United States) L Raymond (Australia) R Stubbs	w/o

Final
1	(Zimbabwe) C Black (United States) M Navratilova	2	4
2	(United States) L Raymond (Australia) R Stubbs	6	6
