= 1983 Porsche Classic =

- Date: 24–30 October
- Edition: 6th
- Draw: 32S / 16D
- Prize money: $150,000
- Surface: Hard / indoor
- Location: Filderstadt, West Germany
- Venue: Tennis Sporthalle Filderstad

Champions

Singles
- (United States) Martina Navratilova

Doubles
- (United States) Martina Navratilova / (United States) Candy Reynolds
| ← 1982 · | Porsche Classic | · 1984 → |

The 1983 Porsche Classic was a women's tennis tournament played on indoor hard courts in Filderstadt, West Germany that was part of the 1983 Virginia Slims World Championship Series. The tournament was held from 24 October until 30 October 1983. First-seeded Martina Navratilova won the singles title, her second consecutive, and earned $28,000 first-prize money.

== Finals ==
=== Singles ===
(United States) Martina Navratilova defeated (France) Catherine Tanvier 6–1, 6–2

- It was Navratilova's 14th singles title of the year and the 84th of her career.

=== Doubles ===
(United States) Martina Navratilova / (United States) Candy Reynolds defeated (Romania) Virginia Ruzici / (France) Catherine Tanvier 6–2, 6–1

- It was Navratilova's 25th title of the year and the 176th of her career. It was Reynolds' 7th title of the year and the 16th of her career.

== Prize money ==
| Event | W | F | SF | QF | Round of 16 | Round of 32 |
| Singles | $28,000 | $14,000 | $7,000 | $3,350 | $1,675 | $825 |
