= 2002 Porsche Tennis Grand Prix =

- Date: 7–13 October
- Edition: 25th
- Category: Tier II
- Draw: 28S / 16D
- Prize money: $625,000
- Surface: Hard (Greenset) / indoor
- Location: Filderstadt, Germany
- Venue: Filderstadt Tennis Club

Champions

Singles
- (Belgium) Kim Clijsters

Doubles
- (United States) Lindsay Davenport / (United States) Lisa Raymond
- Porsche Tennis Grand Prix

The 2002 Porsche Tennis Grand Prix was a women's tennis tournament played on indoor hard courts at the Filderstadt Tennis Club in Filderstadt, Germany that was part of Tier II of the 2002 WTA Tour. It was the 25th edition of the tournament and was held from 7 October until 13 October 2002. Sixth-seeded Kim Clijsters won the singles title and earned $97,000 first-prize money.

== Finals ==
=== Singles ===
(Belgium) Kim Clijsters defeated (Slovakia) Daniela Hantuchová 4–6, 6–3, 6–4

- It was Clijsters' 2nd singles title of the year and the 8th of her career.

=== Doubles ===
(United States) Lindsay Davenport / (United States) Lisa Raymond defeated (United States) Meghann Shaughnessy / (Argentina) Paola Suárez 6–2, 6–4

== Prize money ==
Event	W	F	SF	QF	Round of 16	Round of 32
Singles	$97,000	$51,500	$27,500	$14,725	$7,850	$4,200
