= 1996 Porsche Tennis Grand Prix =

- Date: 7–13 October
- Edition: 19th
- Category: Tier II
- Draw: 28S / 16D
- Prize money: $450,000
- Surface: Hard (Greenset) / indoor
- Location: Filderstadt, Germany
- Venue: Filderstadt Tennis Club

Champions

Singles
- (Switzerland) Martina Hingis

Doubles
- (United States) Nicole Arendt / (Czech Republic) Jana Novotná
- Porsche Tennis Grand Prix

The 1996 Porsche Tennis Grand Prix was a women's tennis tournament played on indoor hard courts at the Filderstadt Tennis Club in Filderstadt in Germany that was part of Tier II of the 1996 WTA Tour. It was the 19th edition of the tournament and was held from 7 October until 13 October 1996. Eighth-seeded Martina Hingis won the singles title.

== Finals ==
=== Singles ===
(Switzerland) Martina Hingis defeated (Germany) Anke Huber 6–2, 3–6, 6–3

- It was Hingis' 1st singles title of the year and of her career.

=== Doubles ===
(United States) Nicole Arendt / (Czech Republic) Jana Novotná defeated (Switzerland) Martina Hingis / (Czech Republic) Helena Suková 6–2, 6–3

- It was Arendt's 2nd title of the year and the 9th of her career. It was Novotná's 7th title of the year and the 73rd of her career.
