= 1998 Porsche Tennis Grand Prix =

- Date: 5–11 October
- Edition: 21st
- Category: Tier II
- Draw: 28S / 16D
- Prize money: $450,000
- Surface: Hard / indoor
- Location: Filderstadt, Germany
- Venue: Filderstadt Tennis Club

Champions

Singles
- (France) Sandrine Testud

Doubles
- (United States) Lindsay Davenport (Belarus) Natasha Zvereva
- Porsche Tennis Grand Prix

The 1998 Porsche Tennis Grand Prix was a women's tennis tournament played on indoor hard courts at the Filderstadt Tennis Club in Filderstadt in Germany that was part of Tier II of the 1998 WTA Tour. It was the 21st edition of the tournament and was held from 5 October until 11 October 1998. Unseeded Sandrine Testud won the singles title and earned $79,000 first-prize money.

== Finals ==
=== Singles ===
(France) Sandrine Testud defeated (United States) Lindsay Davenport 7–5, 6–3

- It was Testud's only title of the year and the 2nd of her career.

=== Doubles ===
(United States) Lindsay Davenport / (Belarus) Natasha Zvereva defeated (Russia) Anna Kournikova / (Spain) Arantxa Sánchez-Vicario 6–4, 6–2

- It was Davenport's 10th title of the year and the 41st of her career. It was Zvereva's 6th title of the year and the 79th of her career.

== Prize money ==
Event	W	F	SF	QF	Round of 16	Round of 32
Singles	$79,000	$36,000	$17,850	$9,400	$4,950	$2,600
