= 2018 Porsche Tennis Grand Prix – Doubles =

Doubles
- 2018 Porsche Tennis Grand Prix

Final
- Champions: (United States) Raquel Atawo (Germany) Anna-Lena Grönefeld
- Runners-up: (United States) Nicole Melichar (Czech Republic) Květa Peschke
- Score: 6–4, 6–7^{(5–7)}, [10–5]

Details
- Draw: 16
- Seeds: 4

Events
Singles	Doubles
- Porsche Tennis Grand Prix

Raquel Atawo and Jeļena Ostapenko were the defending champions, but chose not to participate together this year. Atawo successfully defended the title alongside Anna-Lena Grönefeld, defeating Nicole Melichar and Květa Peschke in the final, 6–4, 6–7^{(5–7)}, [10–5]. Ostapenko teamed up with Olga Savchuk, but lost in the quarterfinals to Atawo and Grönefeld.

== Seeds ==
1. (Slovenia) Andreja Klepač / (Spain) María José Martínez Sánchez (semifinals)
2. (Russia) Alla Kudryavtseva / (Czech Republic) Andrea Sestini Hlaváčková (first round)
3. (Netherlands) Kiki Bertens / (Netherlands) Demi Schuurs (quarterfinals)
4. (United States) Raquel Atawo / (Germany) Anna-Lena Grönefeld (champions)

== Draw ==
Key

- Q = Qualifier
- WC = Wild card
- LL = Lucky loser
- Alt = Alternate
- ITF = ITF entry
- PR = Protected ranking
- SR = Special ranking
- SE = Special exempt
- JE = Junior exempt
- JR = Junior Accelerator Programme entrant
- CO = College Accelerator Programme entrant
- NG = Next Gen Accelerator Program entrant
- w/o = Walkover
- r = Retired
- d = Defaulted

=== Draw ===
First round
1	(Slovenia) A Klepač (Spain) MJ Martínez Sánchez	3	6	[10]
(Ukraine) N Kichenok (Australia) An Rodionova	6	2	[3]
(United States) B Mattek-Sands (United States) C Vandeweghe	7^{7}	7
(Spain) A Parra Santonja (Slovenia) K Srebotnik	6^{3}	5
4	(United States) R Atawo (Germany) A-L Grönefeld	7^{9}	3	[10]
(Australia) M Adamczak (Ukraine) L Kichenok	6^{7}	6	[1]
WC	(Germany) A Lottner (Germany) L Rüffer	6^{2}	6	[2]
(Latvia) J Ostapenko (Ukraine) O Savchuk	7^{7}	2	[10]
(Romania) M Buzărnescu (France) A Cornet	6	5	[4]
(Russia) V Kudermetova (Belarus) L Marozava	1	7	[10]
(Japan) S Aoyama (Japan) M Kato	1	2
3	(Netherlands) K Bertens (Netherlands) D Schuurs	6	6
(Poland) A Rosolska (United States) A Spears	6	3	[10]
(Germany) C Witthöft (Germany) A Zaja	3	6	[7]
(United States) N Melichar (Czech Republic) K Peschke	7^{7}	3	[11]
2	(Russia) A Kudryavtseva (Czech Republic) A Sestini Hlaváčková	6^{4}	6	[9]

Quarterfinals
1	(Slovenia) A Klepač (Spain) MJ Martínez Sánchez	6	6
(United States) B Mattek-Sands (United States) C Vandeweghe	2	2
4	(United States) R Atawo (Germany) A-L Grönefeld	6	7^{12}
(Latvia) J Ostapenko (Ukraine) O Savchuk	1	6^{10}
(Russia) V Kudermetova (Belarus) L Marozava	6	7
3	(Netherlands) K Bertens (Netherlands) D Schuurs	1	5
(Poland) A Rosolska (United States) A Spears	4	4
(United States) N Melichar (Czech Republic) K Peschke	6	6

Semifinals
1	(Slovenia) A Klepač (Spain) MJ Martínez Sánchez	5	3
4	(United States) R Atawo (Germany) A-L Grönefeld	7	6
(Russia) V Kudermetova (Belarus) L Marozava	3	5
(United States) N Melichar (Czech Republic) K Peschke	6	7

Final
4	(United States) R Atawo (Germany) A-L Grönefeld	6	6^{5}	[10]
(United States) N Melichar (Czech Republic) K Peschke	4	7	[5]
