= 2002 Porsche Tennis Grand Prix – Singles =

Singles
- 2002 Porsche Tennis Grand Prix

Final
- Champion: (Belgium) Kim Clijsters
- Runner-up: (Slovakia) Daniela Hantuchová
- Score: 4–6, 6–3, 6–4

Details
- Draw: 28 (4WC/3Q)
- Seeds: 8

Events
Singles	Doubles
- Women's Stuttgart Open

Lindsay Davenport was the defending champion, but lost in quarterfinals to Kim Clijsters.

Clijsters defeated Daniela Hantuchová 4–6, 6–3, 6–4 in the final. She received a Porsche Boxster-S as a prize.

== Seeds ==
The first four seeds received a bye into the second round.

1. (United States) Jennifer Capriati (second round)
2. (United States) Lindsay Davenport (quarterfinals)
3. (Federal Republic of Yugoslavia) Jelena Dokic (second round)
4. (Belgium) Justine Henin (second round)
5. (France) Amélie Mauresmo (semifinals)
6. (Belgium) Kim Clijsters (champion)
7. (Switzerland) Martina Hingis (second round)
8. (Slovakia) Daniela Hantuchová (final)

== Draw ==
Key

- Q = Qualifier
- WC = Wild card
- LL = Lucky loser
- Alt = Alternate
- ITF = ITF entry
- PR = Protected ranking
- SR = Special ranking
- SE = Special exempt
- JE = Junior exempt
- JR = Junior Accelerator Programme entrant
- CO = College Accelerator Programme entrant
- NG = Next Gen Accelerator Program entrant
- w/o = Walkover
- r = Retired
- d = Defaulted

=== Finals ===
Semifinals
8	(Slovakia) Daniela Hantuchová	6	6
(Russia) Elena Dementieva	3	2
5	(France) Amélie Mauresmo	6	3	5
6	(Belgium) Kim Clijsters	3	6	7

Final
8	(Slovakia) Daniela Hantuchová	6	3	4
6	(Belgium) Kim Clijsters	4	6	6

=== Top half ===
First round
WC	(United States) M Shaughnessy	3	7	3
Q	(United States) A Stevenson	6	5	6
(United States) C Rubin	6	2	2
WC	(Austria) B Schett	1	6	6
(Czech Republic) D Bedáňová	2	3
8	(Slovakia) D Hantuchová	6	6
Q	(Switzerland) M Casanova	1	6	6
Q	(United States) L Raymond	6	3	4
(Russia) E Dementieva	6	6
(South Africa) A Coetzer	3	0
(Spain) A Sánchez Vicario	4	2
7	(Switzerland) M Hingis	6	6

Second round
1	(United States) J Capriati	6^{4}	6	4
Q	(United States) A Stevenson	7^{7}	4	6
WC	(Austria) B Schett	5	1
8	(Slovakia) D Hantuchová	7	6
4	(Belgium) J Henin	5	6	4
Q	(Switzerland) M Casanova	7	4	6
(Russia) E Dementieva	6	6
7	(Switzerland) M Hingis	3	1

Quarterfinals
Q	(United States) A Stevenson	1	2
8	(Slovakia) D Hantuchová	6	6
Q	(Switzerland) M Casanova	2	3
(Russia) E Dementieva	6	6

Semifinals
8	(Slovakia) D Hantuchová	6	6
(Russia) E Dementieva	3	2

=== Bottom half ===
First round
5	(France) A Mauresmo	6	6
WC	(Germany) B Rittner	4	0
(Bulgaria) M Maleeva	4	6^{5}
(Luxembourg) A Kremer	6	7^{7}
(Russia) T Panova	6	6
(Italy) S Farina Elia	3	2
6	(Belgium) K Clijsters	6	6
(Russia) A Myskina	4	2
Q	(Italy) R Grande	6	4	4
(Croatia) I Majoli	3	6	6
(Israel) A Smashnova	7	6
(Switzerland) P Schnyder	5	4

Second round
5	(France) A Mauresmo	6	6
(Luxembourg) A Kremer	1	2
(Russia) T Panova	1	6	6
3	(Federal Republic of Yugoslavia) J Dokic	6	4	1
6	(Belgium) K Clijsters	6	6
(Croatia) I Majoli	1	2
(Israel) A Smashnova	4	3
2	(United States) L Davenport	6	6

Quarterfinals
5	(France) A Mauresmo	6	6
(Russia) T Panova	3	4
6	(Belgium) K Clijsters	4	6	6
2	(United States) L Davenport	6	3	4

Semifinals
5	(France) A Mauresmo	6	3	5
6	(Belgium) K Clijsters	3	6	7
