= 1998 Porsche Tennis Grand Prix – Doubles =

Doubles
- 1998 Porsche Tennis Grand Prix

Final
- Champions: (United States) Lindsay Davenport (Belarus) Natasha Zvereva
- Runners-up: (Russia) Anna Kournikova (Spain) Arantxa Sánchez Vicario
- Score: 6–4, 6–2

Events
Singles	Doubles
- Porsche Tennis Grand Prix

Martina Hingis and Arantxa Sánchez Vicario were the reigning champions but only Sánchez Vicario competed that year with Anna Kournikova.

Kournikova and Sánchez Vicario lost in the final 6–4, 6–2 against Lindsay Davenport and Natasha Zvereva.

== Seeds ==
Champion seeds are indicated in bold text while text in italics indicates the round in which those seeds were eliminated.

1. (United States) **Lindsay Davenport** / (Belarus) **Natasha Zvereva (champions)**
2. (United States) Lisa Raymond / (Australia) Rennae Stubbs (quarterfinals)
3. (Russia) Elena Likhovtseva / (Czech Republic) Jana Novotná (semifinals)
4. (Russia) Anna Kournikova / (Spain) Arantxa Sánchez Vicario (final)

== Draw ==
Key

- Q = Qualifier
- WC = Wild card
- LL = Lucky loser
- Alt = Alternate
- ITF = ITF entry
- PR = Protected ranking
- SR = Special ranking
- SE = Special exempt
- JE = Junior exempt
- JR = Junior Accelerator Programme entrant
- CO = College Accelerator Programme entrant
- NG = Next Gen Accelerator Program entrant
- w/o = Walkover
- r = Retired
- d = Defaulted

First round
1	(United States) **L Davenport** (Belarus) **N Zvereva**	**6**	**6**
Q	(Italy) S Farina (Slovakia) K Habšudová	2	2
(United States) **K Adams** (Latvia) **L Neiland**	6	**6**	**6**
(Netherlands) M Bollegraf (United States) D Graham	**7**	2	3
3	(Russia) **E Likhovtseva** (Czech Republic) **J Novotná**	**6**	**6**
(Spain) C Martínez (Argentina) P Tarabini	3	3
(United States) **K Po** (Romania) **I Spîrlea**	**6**	5	**6**
(France) J Halard-Decugis (United States) C Rubin	2	**7**	4
(Belgium) **S Appelmans** (Netherlands) **M Oremans**	**6**	**6**
(Indonesia) Y Basuki (Netherlands) C Vis	3	4
(Argentina) F Labat (Belgium) D Van Roost	4	3
4	(Russia) **A Kournikova** (Spain) **A Sánchez Vicario**	**6**	**6**
(Austria) B Schett (Switzerland) P Schnyder	2	2
(South Africa) **M de Swardt** (Ukraine) **E Tatarkova**	**6**	**6**
WC	(United States) S Williams (United States) V Williams	6	1
2	(United States) **L Raymond** (Australia) **R Stubbs**	**7**	**6**

Quarterfinals
1	(United States) **L Davenport** (Belarus) **N Zvereva**	**6**	**7**
(United States) K Adams (Latvia) L Neiland	2	6
3	(Russia) **E Likhovtseva** (Czech Republic) **J Novotná**	**6**	**6**
(United States) K Po (Romania) I Spîrlea	2	3
(Belgium) S Appelmans (Netherlands) M Oremans	0	3
4	(Russia) **A Kournikova** (Spain) **A Sánchez Vicario**	**6**	**6**
(South Africa) **M de Swardt** (Ukraine) **E Tatarkova**	**6**	**7**
2	(United States) L Raymond (Australia) R Stubbs	4	6

Semifinals
1	(United States) **L Davenport** (Belarus) **N Zvereva**	**w/o**
3	(Russia) E Likhovtseva (Czech Republic) J Novotná
4	(Russia) **A Kournikova** (Spain) **A Sánchez Vicario**	**6**	**6**
(South Africa) M de Swardt (Ukraine) E Tatarkova	3	2

Final
1	(United States) **Lindsay Davenport** (Belarus) **Natasha Zvereva**	**6**	**6**
4	(Russia) Anna Kournikova (Spain) Arantxa Sánchez Vicario	4	2
