= 2018 Porsche Tennis Grand Prix – Singles =

Singles
- 2018 Porsche Tennis Grand Prix

Final
- Champion: (Czech Republic) Karolína Plíšková
- Runner-up: (United States) CoCo Vandeweghe
- Score: 7–6^{(7–2)}, 6–4

Details
- Draw: 28
- Seeds: 8

Events
Singles	Doubles
- Porsche Tennis Grand Prix

Laura Siegemund was the defending champion, but lost in the second round to CoCo Vandeweghe.

Karolína Plíšková won the title, defeating Vandeweghe in the final, 7–6^{(7–2)}, 6–4.

15-year-old Marta Kostyuk became the youngest player to win a main draw match in Stuttgart since Martina Hingis in October 1994.

== Seeds ==
The top four seeds received a bye into the second round.

1. (Romania) Simona Halep (quarterfinals)
2. (Spain) Garbiñe Muguruza (second round, retired)
3. (Ukraine) Elina Svitolina (quarterfinals)
4. (Latvia) Jeļena Ostapenko (quarterfinals)
5. (Czech Republic) Karolína Plíšková (champion)
6. (France) Caroline Garcia (semifinals)
7. (United States) Sloane Stephens (first round)
8. (Czech Republic) Petra Kvitová (first round)

== Draw ==
Key

- Q = Qualifier
- WC = Wild card
- LL = Lucky loser
- Alt = Alternate
- ITF = ITF entry
- PR = Protected ranking
- SR = Special ranking
- SE = Special exempt
- JE = Junior exempt
- JR = Junior Accelerator Programme entrant
- CO = College Accelerator Programme entrant
- NG = Next Gen Accelerator Program entrant
- w/o = Walkover
- r = Retired
- d = Defaulted

=== Finals ===
Semifinals
WC	(United States) CoCo Vandeweghe	6	6
6	(France) Caroline Garcia	4	2
5	(Czech Republic) Karolína Plíšková	6	6
(Estonia) Anett Kontaveit	4	2

Final
WC	(United States) CoCo Vandeweghe	6^{2}	4
5	(Czech Republic) Karolína Plíšková	7^{7}	6

=== Top half ===
First round
(Russia) D Kasatkina	2	2
(Slovakia) M Rybáriková	6	6
(Czech Republic) B Strýcová	4	3
WC	(Germany) L Siegemund	6	6
WC	(United States) C Vandeweghe	6	6
7	(United States) S Stephens	1	0
(Germany) J Görges	2	2
Q	(Czech Republic) M Vondroušová	6	6
Q	(Ukraine) M Kostyuk	6	6
WC	(Germany) A Lottner	4	1
WC	(Russia) M Sharapova	6	6^{6}	4
6	(France) C Garcia	3	7^{8}	6

Second round
1	(Romania) S Halep	4	6	6
(Slovakia) M Rybáriková	6	2	3
WC	(Germany) L Siegemund	4	6	3
WC	(United States) C Vandeweghe	6	4	6
3	(Ukraine) E Svitolina	2	6	3
Q	(Czech Republic) M Vondroušová	6	1	2^{r}
Q	(Ukraine) M Kostyuk	1	6	5
6	(France) C Garcia	6	3	7

Quarterfinals
1	(Romania) S Halep	4	1
WC	(United States) C Vandeweghe	6	6
3	(Ukraine) E Svitolina	7^{7}	4	2
6	(France) C Garcia	6^{4}	6	6

Semifinals
WC	(United States) C Vandeweghe	6	6
6	(France) C Garcia	4	2

=== Bottom half ===
First round
5	(Czech Republic) Ka Plíšková	6	6
(Netherlands) K Bertens	2	2
Q	(Russia) V Kudermetova	7^{7}	6
(Spain) C Suárez Navarro	6^{5}	2
LL	(Germany) C Witthöft	3	2
Q	(Kazakhstan) Z Diyas	6	6
8	(Czech Republic) P Kvitová	3	2
(Germany) A Kerber	6	6
(France) K Mladenovic	7	6^{3}	6^{5}
(Estonia) A Kontaveit	5	7^{7}	7^{7}
(United States) M Keys	6^{7}	7	4
(Russia) A Pavlyuchenkova	7^{9}	5	6

Second round
5	(Czech Republic) Ka Plíšková	7^{7}	6
Q	(Russia) V Kudermetova	6^{4}	3
Q	(Kazakhstan) Z Diyas	3	0
4	(Latvia) J Ostapenko	6	6
(Germany) A Kerber	0	0^{r}
(Estonia) A Kontaveit	6	2
(Russia) A Pavlyuchenkova	7	0
2	(Spain) G Muguruza	5	0^{r}

Quarterfinals
5	(Czech Republic) Ka Plíšková	5	7	6
4	(Latvia) J Ostapenko	7	5	4
(Estonia) A Kontaveit	7	6^{6}	6
(Russia) A Pavlyuchenkova	5	7^{8}	4

Semifinals
5	(Czech Republic) Ka Plíšková	6	6
(Estonia) A Kontaveit	4	2

== Qualifying ==
=== Seeds ===
1. (France) Alizé Cornet (qualifying competition)
2. (Kazakhstan) Zarina Diyas (qualified)
3. (Germany) Carina Witthöft (qualifying competition, lucky loser)
4. (Chinese Taipei) Hsieh Su-wei (second round)
5. (Estonia) Kaia Kanepi (qualifying competition)
6. (Czech Republic) Markéta Vondroušová (qualified)
7. (United States) Varvara Lepchenko (qualifying competition)
8. (United States) Bernarda Pera (first round)

=== Qualifiers ===
1. (Ukraine) Marta Kostyuk
2. (Kazakhstan) Zarina Diyas
3. (Czech Republic) Markéta Vondroušová
4. (Russia) Veronika Kudermetova

=== Lucky loser ===
1. (Germany) Carina Witthöft

=== Draw ===
==== First qualifier ====
First round
1	(France) Alizé Cornet	6	6
(Chile) Daniela Seguel	1	3
(Switzerland) Conny Perrin	6	7^{7}
(Germany) Tamara Korpatsch	1	6^{4}
WC	(Germany) Julia Middendorf	1	2
(Ukraine) Marta Kostyuk	6	6
(Romania) Alexandra Cadanțu	6	7
8	(United States) Bernarda Pera	4	5

Second round
1	(France) Alizé Cornet	7^{7}	7^{7}
(Switzerland) Conny Perrin	6^{2}	6^{2}
(Ukraine) Marta Kostyuk	7	2
(Romania) Alexandra Cadanțu	5	0^{r}

Qualifying competition
1	(France) Alizé Cornet	6	2	3
(Ukraine) Marta Kostyuk	4	6	6

==== Second qualifier ====
First round
2	(Kazakhstan) Zarina Diyas	6	6
(Czech Republic) Marie Bouzková	4	2
(Hungary) Fanny Stollár	5	6^{4}
WC	(Germany) Anna Gabric	7	7^{7}
(Ukraine) Dayana Yastremska	6	6
(Russia) Marina Melnikova	3	3
(France) Chloé Paquet	2	1
5	(Estonia) Kaia Kanepi	6	6

Second round
2	(Kazakhstan) Zarina Diyas	6	6
WC	(Germany) Anna Gabric	3	1
(Ukraine) Dayana Yastremska	2	4
5	(Estonia) Kaia Kanepi	6	6

Qualifying competition
2	(Kazakhstan) Zarina Diyas	6	4	6
5	(Estonia) Kaia Kanepi	4	6	4

==== Third qualifier ====
First round
3	(Germany) Carina Witthöft	6	6
(Slovakia) Michaela Hončová	0	1
(Germany) Anna Zaja	6	6
(Germany) Katharina Hobgarski	4	4
(France) Fiona Ferro	5	1
(France) Océane Dodin	7	6
(Czech Republic) Karolína Muchová	6^{5}	6	2
6	(Czech Republic) Markéta Vondroušová	7^{7}	4	6

Second round
3	(Germany) Carina Witthöft	2	6	6
(Germany) Anna Zaja	6	0	3
(France) Océane Dodin	3	6	1
6	(Czech Republic) Markéta Vondroušová	6	1	6

Qualifying competition
3	(Germany) Carina Witthöft	7	1	3
6	(Czech Republic) Markéta Vondroušová	5	6	6

==== Fourth qualifier ====
First round
4	(Chinese Taipei) Hsieh Su-wei	2	7	6
WC	(Germany) Katharina Gerlach	6	5	2
(Czech Republic) Petra Krejsová	2	3
(Russia) Veronika Kudermetova	6	6
WC	(Germany) Lena Rüffer	4	6	6
(Spain) Paula Badosa Gibert	6	3	0
(Poland) Magdalena Fręch	2	6^{1}
7	(United States) Varvara Lepchenko	6	7^{7}

Second round
4	(Chinese Taipei) Hsieh Su-wei	3	3
(Russia) Veronika Kudermetova	6	6
WC	(Germany) Lena Rüffer	4	1
7	(United States) Varvara Lepchenko	6	6

Qualifying competition
(Russia) Veronika Kudermetova	6	6
7	(United States) Varvara Lepchenko	2	4
