= 2000 Porsche Tennis Grand Prix – Singles =

Singles
- 2000 Porsche Tennis Grand Prix

Final
- Champion: (Switzerland) Martina Hingis
- Runner-up: (Belgium) Kim Clijsters
- Score: 6–0, 6–3

Details
- Draw: 28 (3WC/4Q)
- Seeds: 8

Events
Singles	Doubles
- Women's Stuttgart Open

Martina Hingis was the defending champion and successfully defended her title, by defeating Kim Clijsters 6–0, 6–3 in the final. She received a Porsche Boxster-S as a prize.

== Seeds ==
The first four seeds received a bye into the second round.

1. (Switzerland) Martina Hingis (champion)
2. (Spain) Conchita Martínez (quarterfinals)
3. (France) Nathalie Tauziat (semifinals)
4. (Spain) Arantxa Sánchez Vicario (semifinals)
5. (South Africa) Amanda Coetzer (quarterfinals)
6. (Russia) Anna Kournikova (quarterfinals)
7. (United States) Chanda Rubin (second round)
8. (Belgium) Dominique Van Roost (quarterfinals)

== Draw ==
Key

- Q = Qualifier
- WC = Wild card
- LL = Lucky loser
- Alt = Alternate
- ITF = ITF entry
- PR = Protected ranking
- SR = Special ranking
- SE = Special exempt
- JE = Junior exempt
- JR = Junior Accelerator Programme entrant
- CO = College Accelerator Programme entrant
- NG = Next Gen Accelerator Program entrant
- w/o = Walkover
- r = Retired
- d = Defaulted

=== Finals ===
Semifinals
1	(Switzerland) Martina Hingis	6	6
4	(Spain) Arantxa Sánchez Vicario	1	0
3	(France) Nathalie Tauziat	6	4	1
WC	(Belgium) Kim Clijsters	3	6	6

Final
1	(Switzerland) Martina Hingis	6	6
WC	(Belgium) Kim Clijsters	0	3

=== Top half ===
First round
Q	(Belgium) J Henin	6	6
(Spain) G León García	4	2
Q	(Sweden) Å Carlsson	6	6
(Spain) M Serna	3	3
(Luxembourg) A Kremer	5	6^{4}
8	(Belgium) D Van Roost	7	7^{7}
(Zimbabwe) C Black	7	6
(Austria) B Schett	5	1
(Romania) R Dragomir	3	4
(Switzerland) P Schnyder	6	6
(Croatia) S Talaja	4	0
5	(South Africa) A Coetzer	6	6

Second round
1	(Switzerland) M Hingis	6	3
Q	(Belgium) J Henin	3	0^{r}
Q	(Sweden) Å Carlsson	3	1
8	(Belgium) D Van Roost	6	6
4	(Spain) A Sánchez Vicario	6	3	6
(Zimbabwe) C Black	2	6	4
(Switzerland) P Schnyder	5	4
5	(South Africa) A Coetzer	7	6

Quarterfinals
1	(Switzerland) M Hingis	6	6
8	(Belgium) D Van Roost	2	1
4	(Spain) A Sánchez Vicario	6	2	6
5	(South Africa) A Coetzer	2	6	3

Semifinals
1	(Switzerland) M Hingis	6	6
4	(Spain) A Sánchez Vicario	1	0

=== Bottom half ===
First round
7	(United States) C Rubin	6	6^{11}	6
(United States) J Capriati	0	7^{13}	2
(France) AG Sidot	4	6	6
Q	(Czech Republic) D Chládková	6	3	4
(Russia) E Likhovtseva	2	5
(Germany) B Rittner	6	7
6	(Russia) A Kournikova	4	3
WC	(Belgium) K Clijsters	6	6
WC	(Germany) J Kandarr	6	6
Q	(Russia) T Panova	3	2
(Belgium) S Appelmans	4	7	5
(Bulgaria) M Maleeva	6	5	7

Second round
7	(United States) C Rubin	5	6	4
(France) AG Sidot	7	1	6
(Germany) B Rittner	6	3	2
3	(France) N Tauziat	3	6	6
WC	(Belgium) K Clijsters	7^{11}	6
WC	(Germany) J Kandarr	6^{9}	3
(Bulgaria) M Maleeva	6	3	5
2	(Spain) C Martínez	4	6	7

Quarterfinals
(France) AG Sidot	5	2
3	(France) N Tauziat	7	6
WC	(Belgium) K Clijsters	7	7
2	(Spain) C Martínez	5	5

Semifinals
3	(France) N Tauziat	6	4	1
WC	(Belgium) K Clijsters	3	6	6
