= 2001 Porsche Tennis Grand Prix =

- Date: 8–14 October
- Edition: 24th
- Category: Tier II
- Draw: 28S / 16D
- Prize money: $565,000
- Surface: Hard (Greenset) / indoor
- Location: Filderstadt, Germany
- Venue: Filderstadt Tennis Club

Champions

Singles
- (United States) Lindsay Davenport

Doubles
- (United States) Lindsay Davenport / (United States) Lisa Raymond
- Porsche Tennis Grand Prix

The 2001 Porsche Tennis Grand Prix was a women's tennis tournament played on indoor hard courts at the Filderstadt Tennis Club in Filderstadt, Germany that was part of Tier II of the 2001 WTA Tour. It was the 24th edition of the tournament and was held from 8 October until 14 October 2001. Third-seeded Lindsay Davenport won the singles title and earned $90,000 first-prize money.

== Finals ==
=== Singles ===
(United States) Lindsay Davenport defeated (Belgium) Justine Henin 7–5, 6–4

- It was Davenport's 5th singles title of the year and the 35th of her career.

=== Doubles ===
(United States) Lindsay Davenport / (United States) Lisa Raymond defeated (Belgium) Justine Henin / (United States) Meghann Shaughnessy 6–4, 6–7^{(4–7)}, 7–5

== Prize money ==
Event	W	F	SF	QF	Round of 16	Round of 32
Singles	$90,000	$48,000	$25,500	$13,700	$7,300	$3,900
