= 1986 Porsche Tennis Grand Prix =

- Date: 13–19 October
- Edition: 9th
- Draw: 32S / 16D
- Prize money: $175,000
- Surface: Hard / indoor
- Location: Filderstadt, West Germany

Champions

Singles
- (United States) Martina Navratilova

Doubles
- (United States) Martina Navratilova / (United States) Pam Shriver
- Porsche Tennis Grand Prix

The 1986 Porsche Tennis Grand Prix was a women's tennis tournament played on indoor hard courts in Filderstadt, West Germany that was part of the 1986 WTA Tour. It was the ninth edition of the tournament and was held from 13 October through 19 October 1986. First-seeded Martina Navratilova won the singles title.

== Finals ==
=== Singles ===
(United States) Martina Navratilova defeated (Czechoslovakia) Hana Mandlíková 6–2, 6–3

- It was Navratilova's 11th singles title of the year and the 122nd of her career.

=== Doubles ===
(United States) Martina Navratilova / (United States) Pam Shriver defeated (United States) Zina Garrison / (Argentina) Gabriela Sabatini 7–6^{(7–5)}, 6–4
