= 1995 Porsche Tennis Grand Prix =

- Date: 9–15 October
- Edition: 18th
- Category: Tier II
- Draw: 32S / 16D
- Prize money: $430,000
- Surface: Hard (Greenset) / indoor
- Location: Filderstadt, Germany
- Venue: Filderstadt Tennis Centre

Champions

Singles
- (Croatia) Iva Majoli

Doubles
- (United States) Gigi Fernández / (Belarus) Natasha Zvereva
- Porsche Tennis Grand Prix

The 1995 Porsche Tennis Grand Prix was a women's tennis tournament played on indoor hard courts at the Filderstadt Tennis Centre in Filderstadt, Germany and was part of the Tier II of the 1995 WTA Tour. It was the 18th edition of the tournament and was held from 9 October to 15 October 1995. Seventh-seeded Iva Majoli won the singles title and earned $79,000 first-prize money as well as 300 ranking points.

== Finals ==
=== Singles ===
(Croatia) Iva Majoli defeated (Argentina) Gabriela Sabatini 6–4, 7–6^{(7–4)}

- It was Majoli's 2nd singles title of the year and of her career.

=== Doubles ===
(United States) Gigi Fernández / (Belarus) Natasha Zvereva defeated (United States) Meredith McGrath / (Latvia) Larisa Savchenko 5–7, 6–1, 6–4

- It was Fernández's 8th and last doubles title of the year and the 62nd of her career. It was Zvereva's 7th and last doubles title of the year and the 57th of her career.

== Prize money ==
Event	W	F	SF	QF	Round of 16	Round of 32
Singles	$79,000	$36,000	$17,700	$9,325	$4,900	$2,570
