= 1982 Porsche Tennis Grand Prix =

- Date: 18–24 October
- Edition: 5th
- Category: Toyota Series (Category 4)
- Draw: 32S / 16D
- Prize money: $125,000
- Surface: Carpet / indoor
- Location: Filderstadt, West Germany
- Venue: Tennis Sporthalle Filderstadt

Champions

Singles
- (United States) Martina Navratilova

Doubles
- (United States) Martina Navratilova / (United States) Pam Shriver
- Women's Stuttgart Open

The 1982 Porsche Tennis Grand Prix was a women's singles tennis tournament played on indoor carpet courts at the Tennis Sporthalle Filderstadt in Filderstadt in West Germany. The event was part of the Category 4 (Note: Tournaments with prize money for the women of at least $125,000.) tier of the 1982 Toyota Series. It was the fifth edition of the tournament and was held from 18 October through 24 October 1982. First-seeded Martina Navratilova won the singles event and the accompanying $22,000 first-prize money.

== Finals ==
=== Singles ===
(United States) Martina Navratilova defeated (United States) Tracy Austin 6–3, 6–3

- It was Navratilova's 12th singles title of the year and the 67th of her career.

=== Doubles ===
(United States) Martina Navratilova / (United States) Pam Shriver defeated (United States) Candy Reynolds / (United States) Anne Smith 6–2, 6–3

== Prize money ==
Event	W	F	SF	QF	Round of 16	Round of 32
Singles	$22,000	$11,000	$5,775	$2,800	$1,450	$725
