= 2000 Porsche Tennis Grand Prix – Doubles =

Doubles
- 2000 Porsche Tennis Grand Prix

Final
- Champions: (Switzerland) Martina Hingis (Russia) Anna Kournikova
- Runners-up: (Spain) Arantxa Sánchez Vicario (Austria) Barbara Schett
- Score: 6–4, 6–2

Details
- Draw: 16 (1WC/1Q)
- Seeds: 4

Events
Singles	Doubles
- Women's Stuttgart Open

Chanda Rubin and Sandrine Testud were the defending champions, but Testud could not compete this year after suffering a stress fracture in her rib during the 2000 Summer Olympics. Rubin teamed up with Magüi Serna and lost in first round to Alexandra Fusai and Nathalie Tauziat.

Martina Hingis and Anna Kournikova won the title by defeating Arantxa Sánchez Vicario and Barbara Schett 6–4, 6–2 in the final.

== Seeds ==
1. (Switzerland) Martina Hingis / (Russia) Anna Kournikova (champions)
2. (France) Alexandra Fusai / (France) Nathalie Tauziat (semifinals)
3. (Zimbabwe) Cara Black / (Russia) Elena Likhovtseva (semifinals)
4. (Spain) Arantxa Sánchez Vicario / (Austria) Barbara Schett (final)

== Draw ==
Key

- Q = Qualifier
- WC = Wild card
- LL = Lucky loser
- Alt = Alternate
- ITF = ITF entry
- PR = Protected ranking
- SR = Special ranking
- SE = Special exempt
- JE = Junior exempt
- JR = Junior Accelerator Programme entrant
- CO = College Accelerator Programme entrant
- NG = Next Gen Accelerator Program entrant
- w/o = Walkover
- r = Retired
- d = Defaulted

=== Draw ===
First round
1	(Switzerland) M Hingis (Russia) A Kournikova	6	6
(United States) N Arendt (Netherlands) M Bollegraf	3	2
(Belgium) E Callens (Belgium) D Van Roost	3	4
(Sweden) Å Carlsson (Canada) S Jeyaseelan	6	6
3	(Zimbabwe) C Black (Russia) E Likhovtseva	6	6
(United States) K Po (France) AG Sidot	3	3
Q	(Germany) G Arn (Germany) A Barna	3	1
(South Africa) A Coetzer (Netherlands) C Vis	6	6
(Slovakia) K Habšudová (Croatia) J Kostanić	6	3	6
(Belgium) S Appelmans (Romania) C Cristea	1	6	4
WC	(Belgium) K Clijsters (Germany) B Rittner	4	4
4	(Spain) A Sánchez Vicario (Austria) B Schett	6	6
(Spain) C Martínez (Argentina) P Tarabini	4	3
(Romania) R Dragomir (Italy) S Farina Elia	6	6
(United States) C Rubin (Spain) M Serna	3	5
2	(France) A Fusai (France) N Tauziat	6	7

Quarterfinals
1	(Switzerland) M Hingis (Russia) A Kournikova	7	6
(Sweden) Å Carlsson (Canada) S Jeyaseelan	5	2
3	(Zimbabwe) C Black (Russia) E Likhovtseva	6	6
(South Africa) A Coetzer (Netherlands) C Vis	2	2
(Slovakia) K Habšudová (Croatia) J Kostanić	1	3
4	(Spain) A Sánchez Vicario (Austria) B Schett	6	6
(Romania) R Dragomir (Italy) S Farina Elia	5	3
2	(France) A Fusai (France) N Tauziat	7	6

Semifinals
1	(Switzerland) M Hingis (Russia) A Kournikova	7	3	6
3	(Zimbabwe) C Black (Russia) E Likhovtseva	5	6	3
4	(Spain) A Sánchez Vicario (Austria) B Schett	3	6	6
2	(France) A Fusai (France) N Tauziat	6	3	1

Final
1	(Switzerland) M Hingis (Russia) A Kournikova	6	6
4	(Spain) A Sánchez Vicario (Austria) B Schett	4	2
