= 1993 Porsche Tennis Grand Prix =

- Date: 11–17 October
- Edition: 16th
- Category: Tier II
- Draw: 32S / 16D
- Prize money: $375,000
- Surface: Hard (Greenset) / indoor
- Location: Filderstadt, Germany
- Venue: Filderstadt Tennis Centre

Champions

Singles
- (France) Mary Pierce

Doubles
- (United States) Gigi Fernández / (Belarus) Natasha Zvereva
← 1992 ·	Porsche Tennis Grand Prix	· 1994 →

The 1993 Porsche Tennis Grand Prix was a women's tennis tournament played on indoor hard courts at the Filderstadt Tennis Centre in Filderstadt, Germany and was part of the Tier II of the 1993 WTA Tour. It was the 16th edition of the tournament and was held from 11 October to 17 October 1993. Third-seeded Mary Pierce won the singles title and earned $75,000 first-prize money as well as 300 ranking points.

== Finals ==
=== Singles ===
(France) Mary Pierce defeated (Belarus) Natasha Zvereva 6–3, 6–3

- It was Pierce's 1st singles title of the year and the 5th of her career.

=== Doubles ===
(United States) Gigi Fernández / (Belarus) Natasha Zvereva defeated (United States) Patty Fendick / (United States) Martina Navratilova 7–6^{(8–6)}, 6–4

== Prize money and ranking points ==
Event		W	F	SF	QF	Round of 16	Round of 32
Singles	Prize money	$75,000	$33,750	$16,925	$8,450	$4,300	$2,250
Singles	Points	300	210	135	70	35	18
