= Women's Stuttgart Open =

Porsche Tennis Grand Prix
- 2026 Porsche Tennis Grand Prix

WTA Tour
- Founded: 1978
- Editions: 48 (2026)
- Location: Filderstadt (1978–2005); Stuttgart (2006–); Germany
- Venue: Tennis Sporthalle Filderstadt (1978–2005); Porsche Arena (2006–)
- Category: Tier II (1990–2008); Premier (2009–2019); WTA 500 (2021–)
- Surface: Hard (Indoor) (1978–2008); Clay - indoors (2009–)
- Draw: 28S / 16Q / 16D
- Prize money: €1,049,083 (2026)
- Website: porsche-tennis.de

Current champions (2026)
- Singles: (Kazakhstan) Elena Rybakina
- Doubles: (United States) Nicole Melichar-Martinez; Liudmila Samsonova

The Porsche Tennis Grand Prix or the WTA Stuttgart Open is a WTA 500 tennis tournament held in Stuttgart, Germany (until 2005, in Filderstadt, a southern suburb of Stuttgart). Until 2008 the tournament was played on hardcourt in autumn. Since 2009 it is played on clay court in spring, as a warm-up tournament to the French Open, making it the first indoor clay court event on the WTA Tour.

Held since 1978, the tournament is the oldest professional women's indoor tournament in Europe. The event was part of the Tier II category from 1990 until 2008 and as of 2009 has been a Premier tournament on the WTA Tour. The singles champion receives prize money and a Porsche sports car. The players voted for the Porsche Tennis Grand Prix as their favourite Premier tournament in 2007, 2008, 2010–2012, 2014–2017.

The tournament has been won by many former number ones and Grand Slam champions. Martina Navratilova holds the record for most singles wins at the event, with six titles between 1982 and 1992, in addition to eight doubles titles. Tracy Austin and Martina Hingis both come second with four wins each in the singles event, with Austin winning four consecutive. This is followed by Lindsay Davenport and Maria Sharapova with three wins each.

== History ==
The tournament was founded by businessman Dieter Fischer who had organized a men's exhibition tournament (Note: The two-day event had a four-player field consisting of Mark Cox, Charlie Pasarell, Jeff Borowiak and Ray Moore.) in Filderstadt in 1977 to open his tennis centre. After failing to schedule a men's event in 1978 a license for a Tier II women's tournament was purchased for $100,000 and the first edition was held in October 1978, won by 15-year old Tracy Austin. In March 1979 a men's tournament was held, won by Wojciech Fibak, but this event was discontinued as it required too much effort to organize two tournaments annually with a volunteer force. In 1992 a request for promotion to the Tier I category was rejected by the WTA on the grounds that the tournament's centre court, with a 3,000-seat capacity, was too small. In 2002 Fischer sold the tournament licence to Porsche who had been the official sponsor since the first edition.

== Past finals ==
=== Singles ===
| Location | Year | Champion | Runner-up | Score |
|---|---|---|---|---|
| Filderstadt | 1978 | (United States) Tracy Austin | (Netherlands) Betty Stöve | 6–3, 6–3 |
| Filderstadt | 1979 | (United States) Tracy Austin (2) | (Czechoslovakia) Martina Navratilova | 6–2, 6–0 |
| Filderstadt | 1980 | (United States) Tracy Austin (3) | (United States) Sherry Acker | 6–2, 7–5 |
| Filderstadt | 1981 | (United States) Tracy Austin (4) | (United States) Martina Navratilova | 4–6, 6–3, 6–4 |
| Filderstadt | 1982 | (United States) Martina Navratilova | (United States) Tracy Austin | 6–3, 6–3 |
| Filderstadt | 1983 | (United States) Martina Navratilova (2) | (France) Catherine Tanvier | 6–1, 6–2 |
| Filderstadt | 1984 | (Sweden) Catarina Lindqvist | (West Germany) Steffi Graf | 6–1, 6–4 |
| Filderstadt | 1985 | (United States) Pam Shriver | (Sweden) Catarina Lindqvist | 6–1, 7–5 |
| Filderstadt | 1986 | (United States) Martina Navratilova (3) | (Czechoslovakia) Hana Mandlíková | 6–2, 6–3 |
| Filderstadt | 1987 | (United States) Martina Navratilova (4) | (United States) Chris Evert | 7–5, 6–1 |
| Filderstadt | 1988 | (United States) Martina Navratilova (5) | (United States) Chris Evert | 6–2, 6–3 |
| Filderstadt | 1989 | (Argentina) Gabriela Sabatini | (United States) Mary Joe Fernández | 7–6^{(7–5)}, 6–4 |
| Filderstadt | 1990 | (United States) Mary Joe Fernández | (Austria) Barbara Paulus | 6–1, 6–3 |
| Filderstadt | 1991 | (Germany) Anke Huber | (United States) Martina Navratilova | 2–6, 6–2, 7–6^{(7–4)} |
| Filderstadt | 1992 | (United States) Martina Navratilova (6) | (Argentina) Gabriela Sabatini | 7–6^{(7–1)}, 6–3 |
| Filderstadt | 1993 | (France) Mary Pierce | (Belarus) Natasha Zvereva | 6–3, 6–3 |
| Filderstadt | 1994 | (Germany) Anke Huber (2) | (France) Mary Pierce | 6–4, 6–2 |
| Filderstadt | 1995 | (Croatia) Iva Majoli | (Argentina) Gabriela Sabatini | 6–4, 7–6^{(7–4)} |
| Filderstadt | 1996 | (Switzerland) Martina Hingis | (Germany) Anke Huber | 6–2, 3–6, 6–3 |
| Filderstadt | 1997 | (Switzerland) Martina Hingis (2) | (United States) Lisa Raymond | 6–4, 6–2 |
| Filderstadt | 1998 | (France) Sandrine Testud | (United States) Lindsay Davenport | 7–5, 6–3 |
| Filderstadt | 1999 | (Switzerland) Martina Hingis (3) | (France) Mary Pierce | 6–4, 6–1 |
| Filderstadt | 2000 | (Switzerland) Martina Hingis (4) | (Belgium) Kim Clijsters | 6–0, 6–3 |
| Filderstadt | 2001 | (United States) Lindsay Davenport | (Belgium) Justine Henin | 7–5, 6–4 |
| Filderstadt | 2002 | (Belgium) Kim Clijsters | (Slovakia) Daniela Hantuchová | 4–6, 6–3, 6–4 |
| Filderstadt | 2003 | (Belgium) Kim Clijsters (2) | (Belgium) Justine Henin | 5–7, 6–4, 6–2 |
| Filderstadt | 2004 | (United States) Lindsay Davenport (2) | (France) Amélie Mauresmo | 6–2, ret. |
| Filderstadt | 2005 | (United States) Lindsay Davenport (3) | (France) Amélie Mauresmo | 6–2, 6–4 |
| Stuttgart | 2006 | (Russia) Nadia Petrova | (France) Tatiana Golovin | 6–3, 7–6^{(7–4)} |
| Stuttgart | 2007 | (Belgium) Justine Henin | (France) Tatiana Golovin | 2–6, 6–2, 6–1 |
| Stuttgart | 2008 | (Serbia) Jelena Janković | (Russia) Nadia Petrova | 6–4, 6–3 |
| Stuttgart | 2009 | (Russia) Svetlana Kuznetsova | (Russia) Dinara Safina | 6–4, 6–3 |
| Stuttgart | 2010 | (Belgium) Justine Henin (2) | (Australia) Samantha Stosur | 6–4, 2–6, 6–1 |
| Stuttgart | 2011 | (Germany) Julia Görges | (Denmark) Caroline Wozniacki | 7–6^{(7–3)}, 6–3 |
| Stuttgart | 2012 | (Russia) Maria Sharapova | (Belarus) Victoria Azarenka | 6–1, 6–4 |
| Stuttgart | 2013 | (Russia) Maria Sharapova (2) | (China) Li Na | 6–4, 6–3 |
| Stuttgart | 2014 | (Russia) Maria Sharapova (3) | (Serbia) Ana Ivanovic | 3–6, 6–4, 6–1 |
| Stuttgart | 2015 | (Germany) Angelique Kerber | (Denmark) Caroline Wozniacki | 3–6, 6–1, 7–5 |
| Stuttgart | 2016 | (Germany) Angelique Kerber (2) | (Germany) Laura Siegemund | 6–4, 6–0 |
| Stuttgart | 2017 | (Germany) Laura Siegemund | (France) Kristina Mladenovic | 6–1, 2–6, 7–6^{(7–5)} |
| Stuttgart | 2018 | (Czech Republic) Karolína Plíšková | (United States) CoCo Vandeweghe | 7–6^{(7–2)}, 6–4 |
| Stuttgart | 2019 | (Czech Republic) Petra Kvitová | (Estonia) Anett Kontaveit | 6–3, 7–6^{(7–2)} |
| Stuttgart | 2020 | Not held due to the coronavirus pandemic | | |
| Stuttgart | 2021 | (Australia) Ashleigh Barty | (Belarus) Aryna Sabalenka | 3–6, 6–0, 6–3 |
| Stuttgart | 2022 | (Poland) Iga Świątek | Aryna Sabalenka | 6–2, 6–2 |
| Stuttgart | 2023 | (Poland) Iga Świątek (2) | Aryna Sabalenka | 6–3, 6–4 |
| Stuttgart | 2024 | (Kazakhstan) Elena Rybakina | (Ukraine) Marta Kostyuk | 6–2, 6–2 |
| Stuttgart | 2025 | (Latvia) Jeļena Ostapenko | Aryna Sabalenka | 6–4, 6–1 |
| Stuttgart | 2026 | (Kazakhstan) Elena Rybakina (2) | (Czech Republic) Karolina Muchova | 7–5, 6–1 |

=== Doubles ===
| Location | Year | Champion | Runner-up | Score |
|---|---|---|---|---|
| Filderstadt | 1978 | (United States) Tracy Austin (Netherlands) Betty Stöve | (Socialist Federal Republic of Yugoslavia) Mima Jaušovec (Romania) Virginia Ruzici | 6–3, 6–3 |
| Filderstadt | 1979 | (United States) Billie Jean King (United States) Martina Navratilova | (Netherlands) Betty Stöve (Australia) Wendy Turnbull | 6–3, 6–3 |
| Filderstadt | 1980 | (Czechoslovakia) Hana Mandlíková (Netherlands) Betty Stöve (2) | (United States) Kathy Jordan (United States) Anne Smith | 6–4, 7–5 |
| Filderstadt | 1981 | (Socialist Federal Republic of Yugoslavia) Mima Jaušovec (United States) Martina Navratilova (2) | (United States) Barbara Potter (United States) Anne Smith | 6–4, 6–1 |
| Filderstadt | 1982 | (United States) Martina Navratilova (3) (United States) Pam Shriver | (United States) Candy Reynolds (United States) Anne Smith | 6–2, 6–3 |
| Filderstadt | 1983 | (United States) Martina Navratilova (4) (United States) Candy Reynolds | (Romania) Virginia Ruzici (France) Catherine Tanvier | 6–2, 6–1 |
| Filderstadt | 1984 | (West Germany) Claudia Kohde Kilsch (Czechoslovakia) Helena Suková | (West Germany) Bettina Bunge (West Germany) Eva Pfaff | 6–2, 4–6, 6–3 |
| Filderstadt | 1985 | (Czechoslovakia) Hana Mandlíková (United States) Pam Shriver (2) | (Sweden) Carina Karlsson (Denmark) Tine Scheuer-Larsen | 6–2, 6–1 |
| Filderstadt | 1986 | (United States) Martina Navratilova (5) (United States) Pam Shriver (3) | (United States) Zina Garrison (Argentina) Gabriela Sabatini | 7–6^{(7–5)}, 6–4 |
| Filderstadt | 1987 | (United States) Martina Navratilova (6) (United States) Pam Shriver (4) | (United States) Zina Garrison (United States) Lori McNeil | 6–1, 6–2 |
| Filderstadt | 1988 | (United States) Martina Navratilova (7) (Poland) Iwona Kuczyńska | (South Africa) Elna Reinach (Italy) Raffaella Reggi | 6–1, 6–4 |
| Filderstadt | 1989 | (United States) Gigi Fernández (United States) Robin White | (South Africa) Elna Reinach (Italy) Raffaella Reggi | 6–4, 7–6^{(7–2)} |
| Filderstadt | 1990 | (United States) Mary Joe Fernández (United States) Zina Garrison | (Argentina) Mercedes Paz (Spain) Arantxa Sánchez Vicario | 7–5, 6–3 |
| Filderstadt | 1991 | (United States) Martina Navratilova (8) (Czechoslovakia) Jana Novotná | (United States) Pam Shriver (Soviet Union) Natalia Zvereva | 6–2, 5–7, 6–4 |
| Filderstadt | 1992 | (Spain) Arantxa Sánchez Vicario (Czechoslovakia) Helena Suková (2) | (United States) Pam Shriver (Commonwealth of Independent States) Natalia Zvereva | 6–4, 7–5 |
| Filderstadt | 1993 | (United States) Gigi Fernández (2) (Belarus) Natalia Zvereva | (United States) Patty Fendick (United States) Martina Navratilova | 7–6^{(8–6)}, 6–4 |
| Filderstadt | 1994 | (United States) Gigi Fernández (3) (Belarus) Natalia Zvereva (2) | (Netherlands) Manon Bollegraf (Latvia) Larisa Savchenko Neiland | 7–6^{(7–5)}, 6–4 |
| Filderstadt | 1995 | (United States) Gigi Fernández (4) (Belarus) Natalia Zvereva (3) | (United States) Meredith McGrath (Latvia) Larisa Savchenko Neiland | 5–7, 6–1, 6–4 |
| Filderstadt | 1996 | (United States) Nicole Arendt (Czech Republic) Jana Novotná (2) | (Switzerland) Martina Hingis (Czech Republic) Helena Suková | 6–2, 6–3 |
| Filderstadt | 1997 | (Switzerland) Martina Hingis (Spain) Arantxa Sánchez Vicario (2) | (United States) Lindsay Davenport (Czech Republic) Jana Novotná | 7–6^{(7–4)}, 3–6, 7–6^{(7–3)} |
| Filderstadt | 1998 | (United States) Lindsay Davenport (Belarus) Natasha Zvereva (4) | (Russia) Anna Kournikova (Spain) Arantxa Sánchez Vicario | 6–4, 6–2 |
| Filderstadt | 1999 | (United States) Chanda Rubin (France) Sandrine Testud | (Latvia) Larisa Savchenko Neiland (Spain) Arantxa Sánchez Vicario | 6–3, 6–4 |
| Filderstadt | 2000 | (Switzerland) Martina Hingis (2) (Russia) Anna Kournikova | (Spain) Arantxa Sánchez Vicario (Austria) Barbara Schett | 6–4, 6–2 |
| Filderstadt | 2001 | (United States) Lindsay Davenport (2) (United States) Lisa Raymond | (Belgium) Justine Henin (United States) Meghann Shaughnessy | 6–4, 6–7^{(4–7)}, 7–5 |
| Filderstadt | 2002 | (United States) Lindsay Davenport (3) (United States) Lisa Raymond (2) | (United States) Meghann Shaughnessy (Argentina) Paola Suárez | 6–2, 6–4 |
| Filderstadt | 2003 | (United States) Lisa Raymond (3) (Australia) Rennae Stubbs | (Zimbabwe) Cara Black (United States) Martina Navratilova | 6–2, 6–4 |
| Filderstadt | 2004 | (Zimbabwe) Cara Black (Australia) Rennae Stubbs (2) | (Germany) Anna-Lena Grönefeld (Germany) Julia Schruff | 6–3, 6–2 |
| Filderstadt | 2005 | (Slovakia) Daniela Hantuchová (Russia) Anastasia Myskina | (Czech Republic) Květa Hrdličková Peschke (Italy) Francesca Schiavone | 6–0, 3–6, 7–5 |
| Stuttgart | 2006 | (United States) Lisa Raymond (4) (Australia) Samantha Stosur | (Zimbabwe) Cara Black (Australia) Rennae Stubbs | 6–3, 6–4 |
| Stuttgart | 2007 | (Czech Republic) Květa Peschke (Australia) Rennae Stubbs (3) | (Chinese Taipei) Chan Yung-jan (Russia) Dinara Safina | 6–7^{(5–7)}, 7–6^{(7–4)}, [10–2] |
| Stuttgart | 2008 | (Germany) Anna-Lena Grönefeld (Switzerland) Patty Schnyder | (Czech Republic) Květa Peschke (Australia) Rennae Stubbs | 6–2, 6–4 |
| Stuttgart | 2009 | (United States) Bethanie Mattek-Sands (Russia) Nadia Petrova | (Argentina) Gisela Dulko (Italy) Flavia Pennetta | 5–7, 6–3, [10–7] |
| Stuttgart | 2010 | (Argentina) Gisela Dulko (Italy) Flavia Pennetta | (Czech Republic) Květa Peschke (Slovenia) Katarina Srebotnik | 3–6, 7–6^{(7–3)}, [10–5] |
| Stuttgart | 2011 | (Germany) Sabine Lisicki (Australia) Samantha Stosur (2) | (Germany) Kristina Barrois (Germany) Jasmin Wöhr | 6–1, 7–6^{(7–5)} |
| Stuttgart | 2012 | (Czech Republic) Iveta Benešová (Czech Republic) Barbora Záhlavová-Strýcová | (Germany) Julia Görges (Germany) Anna-Lena Grönefeld | 6–4, 7–5 |
| Stuttgart | 2013 | (Germany) Mona Barthel (Germany) Sabine Lisicki (2) | (United States) Bethanie Mattek-Sands (India) Sania Mirza | 6–4, 7–5 |
| Stuttgart | 2014 | (Italy) Sara Errani (Italy) Roberta Vinci | (Zimbabwe) Cara Black (India) Sania Mirza | 6–2, 6–3 |
| Stuttgart | 2015 | (United States) Bethanie Mattek-Sands (2) (Czech Republic) Lucie Šafářová | (France) Caroline Garcia (Slovenia) Katarina Srebotnik | 6–4, 6–3 |
| Stuttgart | 2016 | (France) Caroline Garcia (France) Kristina Mladenovic | (Switzerland) Martina Hingis (India) Sania Mirza | 2–6, 6–1, [10–6] |
| Stuttgart | 2017 | (United States) Raquel Atawo (Latvia) Jeļena Ostapenko | (United States) Abigail Spears (Slovenia) Katarina Srebotnik | 6–4, 6–4 |
| Stuttgart | 2018 | (United States) Raquel Atawo (2) (Germany) Anna-Lena Grönefeld (2) | (United States) Nicole Melichar (Czech Republic) Květa Peschke | 6–4, 6–7^{(5–7)}, [10–5] |
| Stuttgart | 2019 | (Germany) Mona Barthel (2) (Germany) Anna-Lena Friedsam | (Russia) Anastasia Pavlyuchenkova (Czech Republic) Lucie Šafářová | 2–6, 6–3, [10–6] |
| Stuttgart | 2020 | Not held due to the coronavirus pandemic | | |
| Stuttgart | 2021 | (Australia) Ashleigh Barty (United States) Jennifer Brady | (United States) Desirae Krawczyk (United States) Bethanie Mattek-Sands | 6–4, 5–7, [10–5] |
| Stuttgart | 2022 | (United States) Desirae Krawczyk (Netherlands) Demi Schuurs | (United States) Coco Gauff (China) Zhang Shuai | 6–3, 6–4 |
| Stuttgart | 2023 | (United States) Desirae Krawczyk (2) (Netherlands) Demi Schuurs (2) | (United States) Nicole Melichar-Martinez (Mexico) Giuliana Olmos | 6–4, 6–1 |
| Stuttgart | 2024 | (Chinese Taipei) Chan Hao-ching; Veronika Kudermetova | (Norway) Ulrikke Eikeri (Estonia) Ingrid Neel | 4–6, 6–3, [10–2] |
| Stuttgart | 2025 | (Canada) Gabriela Dabrowski (New Zealand) Erin Routliffe | Ekaterina Alexandrova (China) Zhang Shuai | 6–3, 6–3 |
| Stuttgart | 2026 | (United States) Nicole Melichar-Martinez; Liudmila Samsonova | (Latvia) Jeļena Ostapenko (China) Zhang Shuai | 6–1, 6–1 |

== See also ==
- Stuttgart Open – men's tournament
- List of tennis tournaments

== Notes ==
Awards and achievements
| Preceded by Indian Wells | Favorite WTA Tier I - II Tournament; 2007, 2008 | Succeeded by Indian Wells (Premier) |
| Preceded by Indian Wells; Indian Wells | Favorite WTA Premier Tournament; 2010, 2011, 2012; 2014, 2015, 2016, 2017 | Succeeded by Indian Wells; TBD |
