= 2021 Ashleigh Barty tennis season =

2021 tennis player season

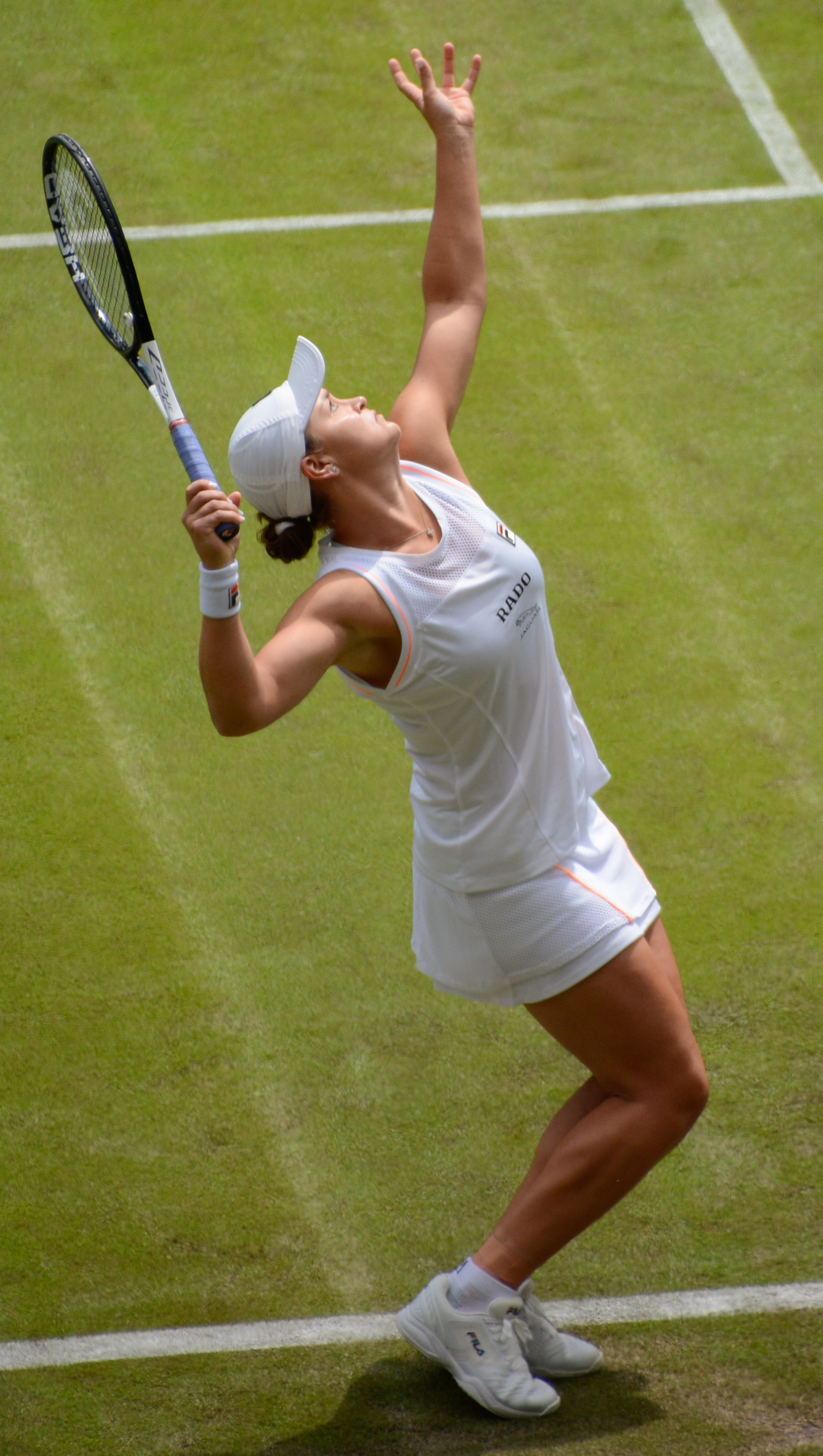
- Barty playing at the 2019 Wimbledon Championships
- Full name: Ashleigh Barty
- Country: Australia
- Calendar prize money: $3,945,182

Singles
- Season record: 42–8
- Calendar titles: 5
- Year-end ranking: No. 1
- Ranking change from previous year: Steady

Grand Slam & significant results
- Australian Open: QF
- French Open: 2R
- Wimbledon: W
- US Open: 3R
- Championships: A
- Olympic Games: 1R

Doubles
- Season record: 7–1
- Calendar titles: 1
- Year-end ranking: No. 102
- Ranking change from previous year: ▼87

Grand Slam doubles results
- Australian Open: 2R
- French Open: A
- Wimbledon: A
- US Open: A
- WTA Championships: DNQ
- Olympic Games: QF

Mixed doubles
- Season record: 2–1

Grand Slam mixed doubles results
- Olympic Games: Bronze medal
- Injuries: Hip injury
- Last updated on: 15 November 2021.

The 2021 Ashleigh Barty tennis season officially began on 1 February 2021 as the start of the 2021 WTA Tour. Ashleigh Barty entered the season as world number 1 player in singles after an 11-month hiatus following the impact of the COVID-19 pandemic on the 2020 WTA Tour.

== All matches ==
Key
W	F	SF	QF	#R	RR	Q#	P#	DNQ	A	Z#	PO	G	S	B	NMS	NTI	P	NH

(W) winner; (F) finalist; (SF) semifinalist; (QF) quarterfinalist; (#R) rounds 4, 3, 2, 1; (RR) round-robin stage; (Q#) qualification round; (P#) preliminary round; (DNQ) did not qualify; (A) absent; (Z#) Davis/Fed Cup Zonal Group (with number indication) or (PO) play-off; (G) gold, (S) silver or (B) bronze Olympic/Paralympic medal; (NMS) not a Masters tournament; (NTI) not a Tier I tournament; (P) postponed; (NH) not held; (SR) strike rate (events won / competed); (W–L) win–loss record.
To avoid confusion and double counting, these charts are updated at the conclusion of a tournament or when the player's participation has ended.

=== Singles matches ===
Tournament	Match	Round	Opponent	Rank	Result	Score
Yarra Valley Classic; Melbourne, Australia; WTA 500; Hard, outdoor; 1 February 2021 – 7 February 2021	–	1R	Bye			
Yarra Valley Classic; Melbourne, Australia; WTA 500; Hard, outdoor; 1 February 2021 – 7 February 2021	1	2R	(Romania) Ana Bogdan	93	Win	6–3, 6–3
Yarra Valley Classic; Melbourne, Australia; WTA 500; Hard, outdoor; 1 February 2021 – 7 February 2021	2	3R	(Czech Republic) Marie Bouzková (16)	52	Win	6–0, 4–6, 6–3
Yarra Valley Classic; Melbourne, Australia; WTA 500; Hard, outdoor; 1 February 2021 – 7 February 2021	3	QF	(United States) Shelby Rogers	60	Win	7–5, 2–6, [10–4]
Yarra Valley Classic; Melbourne, Australia; WTA 500; Hard, outdoor; 1 February 2021 – 7 February 2021	–	SF	(United States) Serena Williams (5)	11	Walkover	—N/a
Yarra Valley Classic; Melbourne, Australia; WTA 500; Hard, outdoor; 1 February 2021 – 7 February 2021	4	W	(Spain) Garbiñe Muguruza (6)	15	Win (1)	7–6^{(7–3)}, 6–4
Australian Open; Melbourne, Australia; Grand Slam; Hard, outdoor; 8 February 2021 – 21 February 2021	5	1R	(Montenegro) Danka Kovinić	82	Win	6–0, 6–0
Australian Open; Melbourne, Australia; Grand Slam; Hard, outdoor; 8 February 2021 – 21 February 2021	6	2R	(Australia) Daria Gavrilova (WC)	387	Win	6–1, 7–6^{(9–7)}
Australian Open; Melbourne, Australia; Grand Slam; Hard, outdoor; 8 February 2021 – 21 February 2021	7	3R	(Russia) Ekaterina Alexandrova (29)	32	Win	6–2, 6–4
Australian Open; Melbourne, Australia; Grand Slam; Hard, outdoor; 8 February 2021 – 21 February 2021	8	4R	(United States) Shelby Rogers	57	Win	6–3, 6–4
Australian Open; Melbourne, Australia; Grand Slam; Hard, outdoor; 8 February 2021 – 21 February 2021	9	QF	(Czech Republic) Karolína Muchová (25)	27	Loss	6–1, 3–6, 2–6
Adelaide International; Adelaide, Australia; WTA 500; Hard, outdoor; 22 February 2021 – 28 February 2021	–	1R	Bye			
Adelaide International; Adelaide, Australia; WTA 500; Hard, outdoor; 22 February 2021 – 28 February 2021	10	2R	(United States) Danielle Collins	37	Loss	3–6, 4–6
Miami Open; Miami Gardens, United States; WTA 1000; Hard, outdoor; 22 March 2021 – 4 April 2021	–	1R	Bye			
Miami Open; Miami Gardens, United States; WTA 1000; Hard, outdoor; 22 March 2021 – 4 April 2021	11	2R	(Slovakia) Kristína Kučová	149	Win	6–3, 4–6, 7–5
Miami Open; Miami Gardens, United States; WTA 1000; Hard, outdoor; 22 March 2021 – 4 April 2021	12	3R	(Latvia) Jeļena Ostapenko	54	Win	6–3, 6–2
Miami Open; Miami Gardens, United States; WTA 1000; Hard, outdoor; 22 March 2021 – 4 April 2021	13	4R	(Belarus) Victoria Azarenka (14)	15	Win	6–1, 1–6, 6–2
Miami Open; Miami Gardens, United States; WTA 1000; Hard, outdoor; 22 March 2021 – 4 April 2021	14	QF	(Belarus) Aryna Sabalenka (7)	8	Win	6–4, 6–7^{(5–7)}, 6–3
Miami Open; Miami Gardens, United States; WTA 1000; Hard, outdoor; 22 March 2021 – 4 April 2021	15	SF	(Ukraine) Elina Svitolina (5)	5	Win	6–3, 6–3
Miami Open; Miami Gardens, United States; WTA 1000; Hard, outdoor; 22 March 2021 – 4 April 2021	16	W	(Canada) Bianca Andreescu (8)	9	Win (2)	6–3, 4–0 retired
Charleston Open; Charleston, United States; WTA 500; Clay, outdoor; 5 April 2021 – 11 April 2021	–	1R	Bye			
Charleston Open; Charleston, United States; WTA 500; Clay, outdoor; 5 April 2021 – 11 April 2021	17	2R	(Japan) Misaki Doi	82	Win	6–1, 6–2
Charleston Open; Charleston, United States; WTA 500; Clay, outdoor; 5 April 2021 – 11 April 2021	18	3R	(United States) Shelby Rogers	52	Win	7–6^{(7–3)}, 4–6, 6–4
Charleston Open; Charleston, United States; WTA 500; Clay, outdoor; 5 April 2021 – 11 April 2021	19	QF	(Spain) Paula Badosa	71	Loss	4–6, 3–6
Stuttgart Open; Stuttgart, Germany; WTA 500; Clay, indoor; 19 April 2021 – 25 April 2021	–	1R	Bye			
Stuttgart Open; Stuttgart, Germany; WTA 500; Clay, indoor; 19 April 2021 – 25 April 2021	20	2R	(Germany) Laura Siegemund	58	Win	6–0, 7–5
Stuttgart Open; Stuttgart, Germany; WTA 500; Clay, indoor; 19 April 2021 – 25 April 2021	21	QF	(Czech Republic) Karolína Plíšková (6)	9	Win	2–6, 6–1, 7–5
Stuttgart Open; Stuttgart, Germany; WTA 500; Clay, indoor; 19 April 2021 – 25 April 2021	22	SF	(Ukraine) Elina Svitolina (4)	5	Win	4–6, 7–6^{(7–5)}, 6–2
Stuttgart Open; Stuttgart, Germany; WTA 500; Clay, indoor; 19 April 2021 – 25 April 2021	23	W	(Belarus) Aryna Sabalenka (5)	7	Win (3)	3–6, 6–0, 6–3
Madrid Open; Madrid, Spain; WTA 1000; Clay, outdoor; 26 April 2021 – 9 May 2021	24	1R	(United States) Shelby Rogers	43	Win	6–2, 6–1
Madrid Open; Madrid, Spain; WTA 1000; Clay, outdoor; 26 April 2021 – 9 May 2021	25	2R	(Slovenia) Tamara Zidanšek	80	Win	6–4, 1–6, 6–3
Madrid Open; Madrid, Spain; WTA 1000; Clay, outdoor; 26 April 2021 – 9 May 2021	26	3R	(Poland) Iga Świątek (14)	17	Win	7–5, 6–4
Madrid Open; Madrid, Spain; WTA 1000; Clay, outdoor; 26 April 2021 – 9 May 2021	27	QF	(Czech Republic) Petra Kvitová (9)	12	Win	6–1, 3–6, 6–3
Madrid Open; Madrid, Spain; WTA 1000; Clay, outdoor; 26 April 2021 – 9 May 2021	28	SF	(Spain) Paula Badosa (WC)	62	Win	6–4, 6–3
Madrid Open; Madrid, Spain; WTA 1000; Clay, outdoor; 26 April 2021 – 9 May 2021	29	F	(Belarus) Aryna Sabalenka (5)	7	Loss (1)	0–6, 6–3, 4–6
Italian Open; Rome, Italy; WTA 1000; Clay, outdoor; 10 May 2021 – 16 May 2021	–	1R	Bye			
Italian Open; Rome, Italy; WTA 1000; Clay, outdoor; 10 May 2021 – 16 May 2021	30	2R	(Kazakhstan) Yaroslava Shvedova (PR)	665	Win	6–4, 6–1
Italian Open; Rome, Italy; WTA 1000; Clay, outdoor; 10 May 2021 – 16 May 2021	31	3R	(Russia) Veronika Kudermetova	28	Win	6–3, 6–3
Italian Open; Rome, Italy; WTA 1000; Clay, outdoor; 10 May 2021 – 16 May 2021	32	QF	(United States) Coco Gauff (25)	35	Loss	6–4, 2–1 retired
French Open; Paris, France; Grand Slam; Clay, outdoor; 31 May 2021 – 13 June 2021	33	1R	(United States) Bernarda Pera	70	Win	6–4, 3–6, 6–2
French Open; Paris, France; Grand Slam; Clay, outdoor; 31 May 2021 – 13 June 2021	34	2R	(Poland) Magda Linette	45	Loss	1–6, 2–2 retired
The Championships, Wimbledon; London, Great Britain; Grand Slam; Grass, outdoor; 28 June 2021 – 12 July 2021	35	1R	(Spain) Carla Suárez Navarro (PR)	138	Win	6–1, 6–7^{(1–7)}, 6–1
The Championships, Wimbledon; London, Great Britain; Grand Slam; Grass, outdoor; 28 June 2021 – 12 July 2021	36	2R	(Russia) Anna Blinkova	89	Win	6–4, 6–3
The Championships, Wimbledon; London, Great Britain; Grand Slam; Grass, outdoor; 28 June 2021 – 12 July 2021	37	3R	(Czech Republic) Kateřina Siniaková	64	Win	6–3, 7–5
The Championships, Wimbledon; London, Great Britain; Grand Slam; Grass, outdoor; 28 June 2021 – 12 July 2021	38	4R	(Czech Republic) Barbora Krejčíková (14)	17	Win	7–5, 6–3
The Championships, Wimbledon; London, Great Britain; Grand Slam; Grass, outdoor; 28 June 2021 – 12 July 2021	39	QF	(Australia) Ajla Tomljanović	75	Win	6–1, 6–3
The Championships, Wimbledon; London, Great Britain; Grand Slam; Grass, outdoor; 28 June 2021 – 12 July 2021	40	SF	(Germany) Angelique Kerber (25)	28	Win	6–3, 7–6^{(7–3)}
The Championships, Wimbledon; London, Great Britain; Grand Slam; Grass, outdoor; 28 June 2021 – 12 July 2021	41	W	(Czech Republic) Karolína Plíšková (8)	13	Win (4)	6–3, 6–7^{(4–7)}, 6–3
Summer Olympics; Tokyo, Japan; Olympic Games; Hard, outdoor; 24 July 2021 – 31 July 2021	42	1R	(Spain) Sara Sorribes Tormo	47	Loss	4–6, 3–6
Cincinnati Open; Mason, United States; WTA 1000; Hard, outdoor; 16 August 2021 – 22 August 2021	–	1R	Bye			
Cincinnati Open; Mason, United States; WTA 1000; Hard, outdoor; 16 August 2021 – 22 August 2021	43	2R	(United Kingdom) Heather Watson (Q)	67	Win	6–4, 7–6^{(7–3)}
Cincinnati Open; Mason, United States; WTA 1000; Hard, outdoor; 16 August 2021 – 22 August 2021	44	3R	(Belarus) Victoria Azarenka (14)	14	Win	6–0, 6–2
Cincinnati Open; Mason, United States; WTA 1000; Hard, outdoor; 16 August 2021 – 22 August 2021	45	QF	(Czech Republic) Barbora Krejčíková (9)	10	Win	6–2, 6–4
Cincinnati Open; Mason, United States; WTA 1000; Hard, outdoor; 16 August 2021 – 22 August 2021	46	SF	(Germany) Angelique Kerber	22	Win	6–2, 7–5
Cincinnati Open; Mason, United States; WTA 1000; Hard, outdoor; 16 August 2021 – 22 August 2021	47	W	(Switzerland) Jil Teichmann (WC)	76	Win (5)	6–3, 6–1
US Open; New York, United States; Grand Slam; Hard, outdoor; 30 August 2021 – 12 September 2021	48	1R	(Russia) Vera Zvonareva	101	Win	6–1, 7–6^{(9–7)}
US Open; New York, United States; Grand Slam; Hard, outdoor; 30 August 2021 – 12 September 2021	49	2R	(Denmark) Clara Tauson	77	Win	6–1, 7–5
US Open; New York, United States; Grand Slam; Hard, outdoor; 30 August 2021 – 12 September 2021	50	3R	(United States) Shelby Rogers	43	Loss	2–6, 6–1, 6–7^{(5–7)}

=== Doubles matches ===
Tournament	Match	Round	Opponent	Rank	Result	Score
Yarra Valley Classic; Melbourne, Australia; WTA 500; Hard, outdoor; 1 February 2021 – 7 February 2021; Partner: (United States) Jennifer Brady	1	1R	(Canada) Sharon Fichman / (Mexico) Giuliana Olmos	57 / 60	Win	7–6^{(7–2)}, 6–1
Yarra Valley Classic; Melbourne, Australia; WTA 500; Hard, outdoor; 1 February 2021 – 7 February 2021; Partner: (United States) Jennifer Brady	2	2R	(United States) Christina McHale / (Tunisia) Ons Jabeur	133 / 218	Win	6–2, 6–3
Yarra Valley Classic; Melbourne, Australia; WTA 500; Hard, outdoor; 1 February 2021 – 7 February 2021; Partner: (United States) Jennifer Brady	3	QF	(United States) Nicole Melichar / (Netherlands) Demi Schuurs (2)	11 / 12	Loss	5–7, 4–6
Australian Open; Melbourne, Australia; Grand Slam; Hard, outdoor; 8 February 2021 – 21 February 2021; Partner: (United States) Jennifer Brady	4	1R	(Australia) Abbie Myers / (Australia) Ivana Popovic	284 / 386	Win	6–2, 6–4
Australian Open; Melbourne, Australia; Grand Slam; Hard, outdoor; 8 February 2021 – 21 February 2021; Partner: (United States) Jennifer Brady	–	2R	(Belarus) Aryna Sabalenka / (Belgium) Elise Mertens (2)	5 / 6	Withdrew	—N/a
Stuttgart Open; Stuttgart, Germany; WTA 500; Clay, indoor; 19 April 2021 – 25 April 2021; Partner: (United States) Jennifer Brady	5	1R	(United States) Sabrina Santamaria / (United States) Kaitlyn Christian	60 / 62	Win	6–3, 6–1
Stuttgart Open; Stuttgart, Germany; WTA 500; Clay, indoor; 19 April 2021 – 25 April 2021; Partner: (United States) Jennifer Brady	6	QF	(China) Xu Yifan / (China) Zhang Shuai (2)	9 / 38	Win	6–4, 6–3
Stuttgart Open; Stuttgart, Germany; WTA 500; Clay, indoor; 19 April 2021 – 25 April 2021; Partner: (United States) Jennifer Brady	7	SF	(China) Wang Yafan / (Germany) Vivian Heisen	76 / 188	Win	6–1, 7–5
Stuttgart Open; Stuttgart, Germany; WTA 500; Clay, indoor; 19 April 2021 – 25 April 2021; Partner: (United States) Jennifer Brady	8	W	(United States) Bethanie Mattek-Sands / (United States) Desirae Krawczyk (1)	16 / 24	Win (1)	6–4, 5–7, [10–5]
Summer Olympics; Tokyo, Japan; Olympic Games; Hard, outdoor; 24 July 2021 – 1 August 2021; Partner: (Australia) Storm Sanders	9	1R	(Japan) Makoto Ninomiya / (Japan) Nao Hibino	57 / 63	Win	6–1, 6–2
Summer Olympics; Tokyo, Japan; Olympic Games; Hard, outdoor; 24 July 2021 – 1 August 2021; Partner: (Australia) Storm Sanders	10	2R	(China) Xu Yifan / (China) Yang Zhaoxuan	17 / 46	Win	6–4, 6–4
Summer Olympics; Tokyo, Japan; Olympic Games; Hard, outdoor; 24 July 2021 – 1 August 2021; Partner: (Australia) Storm Sanders	11	QF	(Czech Republic) Barbora Krejčíková / (Czech Republic) Kateřina Siniaková (1)	2 / 3	Loss	6–3, 4–6, [7–10]

=== Mixed doubles matches ===
Tournament	Match	Round	Opponent	Combined Rank	Result	Score
Summer Olympics; Tokyo, Japan; Olympic Games; Hard, outdoor; 28 July 2021 – 1 August 2021; Partner: (Australia) John Peers	1	1R	(Argentina) Nadia Podoroska / (Argentina) Horacio Zeballos	42	Win	6–1, 7–6^{(7–3)}
Summer Olympics; Tokyo, Japan; Olympic Games; Hard, outdoor; 28 July 2021 – 1 August 2021; Partner: (Australia) John Peers	2	QF	(Greece) Maria Sakkari / (Greece) Stefanos Tsitsipas (2)	23	Win	6–4, 4–6, [10–6]
Summer Olympics; Tokyo, Japan; Olympic Games; Hard, outdoor; 28 July 2021 – 1 August 2021; Partner: (Australia) John Peers	3	SF	(Russia) Anastasia Pavlyuchenkova / (Russia) Andrey Rublev (4)	25	Loss	7–5, 4–6, [11–13]
Summer Olympics; Tokyo, Japan; Olympic Games; Hard, outdoor; 28 July 2021 – 1 August 2021; Partner: (Australia) John Peers	4	B	(Serbia) Nina Stojanović / (Serbia) Novak Djokovic	50	Walkover	—N/a

== Tournament schedule ==
=== Singles schedule ===
Date	Tournament	Location	Category	Surface	Previous result	Previous points	New points	Outcome
1 February 2021 – 7 February 2021	Yarra Valley Classic	Australia	WTA 500	Hard	Not held	0	470	Winner defeated (Spain) Garbiñe Muguruza; 7–6^{(7–3)}, 6–4
8 February 2021 – 21 February 2021	Australian Open	Australia	Grand Slam	Hard	Semifinals	780	430	Quarterfinals lost to (Czech Republic) Karolína Muchová; 6–1, 3–6, 2–6
22 February 2021 – 28 February 2021	Adelaide International	Australia	WTA 500	Hard	Winner	470	1	Second round lost to (United States) Danielle Collins; 3–6, 4–6
22 March 2021 – 4 April 2021	Miami Open	United States	WTA 1000	Hard	Winner	1000	1000	Winner defeated (Canada) Bianca Andreescu; 6–3, 4–0 retired
5 April 2021 – 11 April 2021	Charleston Open	United States	WTA 500	Clay	Did not play	0	100	Quarterfinals lost to (Spain) Paula Badosa; 4–6, 3–6
19 April 2021 – 25 April 2021	Stuttgart Open	Germany	WTA 500	Clay (i)	Did not play	0	470	Winner defeated (Belarus) Aryna Sabalenka; 3–6, 6–0, 6–3
26 April 2021 – 9 May 2021	Madrid Open	Spain	WTA 1000	Clay	Quarterfinals	215	650	Final lost to (Belarus) Aryna Sabalenka; 0–6, 6–3, 4–6
10 May 2021 – 16 May 2021	Italian Open	Italy	WTA 1000	Clay	Third round	105	190	Quarterfinals lost to (United States) Coco Gauff; 6–4, 2–1 retired
31 May 2021 – 13 June 2021	French Open	France	Grand Slam	Clay	Winner	2000	70	Second round lost to (Poland) Magda Linette; 1–6, 2–2 retired
28 June 2021 – 12 July 2021	Wimbledon Championships	Great Britain	Grand Slam	Grass	Fourth round	240	2000	Winner defeated (Czech Republic) Karolína Plíšková; 6–3, 6–7^{(4–7)}, 6–3
24 July 2021 – 31 July 2021	Summer Olympics	Japan	Olympic Games	Hard	Did not play	0	0	First round lost to (Spain) Sara Sorribes Tormo; 4–6, 3–6
16 August 2021 – 22 August 2021	Cincinnati Open	United States	WTA 1000	Hard	Semifinals	350	900	Winner defeated (Switzerland) Jil Teichmann; 6–3, 6–1
30 August 2021 – 12 September 2021	US Open	United States	Grand Slam	Hard	Fourth round	240	130	Third round lost to (United States) Shelby Rogers; 2–6, 6–1, 6–7^{(5–7)}
Total year-end points							6411	

=== Doubles schedule ===
Date	Tournament	Location	Category	Surface	Previous result	Previous points	New points	Outcome
1 February 2021 – 7 February 2021	Yarra Valley Classic	Australia	WTA 500	Hard	Not held	0	100	Quarterfinals lost to (United States) Nicole Melichar / (Netherlands) Demi Schuurs; 5–7, 4–6
8 February 2021 – 21 February 2021	Australian Open	Australia	Grand Slam	Hard	Second round	70	70	Second round withdrew against (Belgium) Elise Mertens / (Belarus) Aryna Sabalenka; N/A
19 April 2021 – 25 April 2021	Stuttgart Open	Germany	WTA 500	Clay (i)	Did not play	0	470	Winner defeated (United States) Desirae Krawczyk / (United States) Bethanie Mattek-Sands; 6–4, 5–7, [10–5]
24 July 2021 – 1 August 2021	Summer Olympics	Japan	Olympic Games	Hard	Did not play	0	0	Quarterfinals lost to (Czech Republic) Barbora Krejčíková / (Czech Republic) Kateřina Siniaková; 6–3, 4–6, [7–10]
Total year-end points							640	

=== Mixed doubles schedule ===
Date	Tournament	Location	Category	Surface	Previous result	Outcome
28 July 2021 – 1 August 2021	Summer Olympics	Japan	Olympic Games	Hard	Did not play	Bronze medalist walkover against (Serbia) Nina Stojanović / (Serbia) Novak Djokovic; N/A

== Yearly records ==
=== Top 10 wins ===
==== Singles ====
#	Opponent	Rank	Tournament	Surface	Round	Score	ABR
1.	(Belarus) Aryna Sabalenka	No. 8	Miami Open, United States	Hard	Quarterfinals	6–4, 6–7^{(5–7)}, 6–3	No. 1
2.	(Ukraine) Elina Svitolina	No. 5	Miami Open, United States	Hard	Semifinals	6–3, 6–3	No. 1
3.	(Canada) Bianca Andreescu	No. 9	Miami Open, United States	Hard	Final	6–3, 4–0 ret.	No. 1
4.	(Czech Republic) Karolína Plíšková	No. 9	Stuttgart Open, Germany	Clay (i)	Quarterfinals	2–6, 6–1, 7–5	No. 1
5.	(Ukraine) Elina Svitolina	No. 5	Stuttgart Open, Germany	Clay (i)	Semifinals	4–6, 7–6^{(7–5)}, 6–2	No. 1
6.	(Belarus) Aryna Sabalenka	No. 7	Stuttgart Open, Germany	Clay (i)	Final	3–6, 6–0, 6–3	No. 1
7.	(Czech Republic) Barbora Krejčíková	No. 10	Cincinnati Open, United States	Hard	Quarterfinals	6–2, 6–4	No. 1

==== Doubles ====
#	Partner	Opponents	Rank	Tournament	Surface	Round	Score	ABR
1.	(United States) Jennifer Brady	(China) Xu Yifan; (China) Zhang Shuai	No. 9; No. 38	Stuttgart Open, Germany	Clay	Quarterfinals	6–4, 6–3	No. 23

=== Finals ===
==== Singles: 6 (5 titles, 1 runner-up) ====
Legend Grand Slam tournaments (1–0) WTA Tour Championships (0–0) WTA Elite Trophy (0–0) WTA 1000 (2–1) WTA 500 (2–0) WTA 250 (0–0)	Finals by surface Hard (3–0) Clay (1–1) Grass (1–0)	Finals by setting Outdoor (4–1) Indoor (1–0)

Result	W–L	Date	Tournament	Tier	Surface	Opponent	Score
Win	1–0	Feb 2021	Yarra Valley Classic, Australia	WTA 500	Hard	(Spain) Garbiñe Muguruza	7–6^{(7–3)}, 6–4
Win	2–0	Apr 2021	Miami Open, United States	WTA 1000	Hard	(Canada) Bianca Andreescu	6–3, 4–0 ret.
Win	3–0	Apr 2021	Stuttgart Open, Germany	WTA 500	Clay (i)	(Belarus) Aryna Sabalenka	3–6, 6–0, 6–3
Loss	3–1	May 2021	Madrid Open, Spain	WTA 1000	Clay	(Belarus) Aryna Sabalenka	0–6, 6–3, 4–6
Win	4–1	Jul 2021	Wimbledon, United Kingdom	Grand Slam	Grass	(Czech Republic) Karolína Plíšková	6–3, 6–7^{(4–7)}, 6–3
Win	5–1	Aug 2021	Cincinnati Open, United States	WTA 1000	Hard	(Switzerland) Jil Teichmann	6–3, 6–1

==== Doubles: 1 (1 title) ====
Legend Grand Slam tournaments (0–0) WTA Tour Championships (0–0) WTA Elite Trophy (0–0) WTA 1000 (0–0) WTA 500 (1–0) WTA 250 (0–0)	Finals by surface Hard (0–0) Clay (1–0) Grass (0–0)	Finals by setting Outdoor (0–0) Indoor (1–0)

Result	W–L	Date	Tournament	Tier	Surface	Partner	Opponents	Score
Win	1–0	Apr 2021	Stuttgart Open, Germany	WTA 500	Clay (i)	(United States) Jennifer Brady	(United States) Desirae Krawczyk; (United States) Bethanie Mattek-Sands	6–4, 5–7, [10–5]

=== Earnings ===
#	Tournament	Singles Prize money	Doubles Prize money	Year-to-date
1.	Yarra Valley Classic	$50,000	$2,155	$52,155
2.	Australian Open	$359,899	$15,425	$427,479
3.	Adelaide International	$8,200	$0	$435,679
4.	Miami Open	$300,110	$0	$735,789
5.	Charleston Open	$12,670	$0	$748,459
6.	Stuttgart Open	$68,570	$12,615	$829,644
7.	Madrid Open	$233,467	$0	$1,063,111
8.	Italian Open	$41,500	$0	$1,104,611
9.	French Open	$99,124	$0	$1,203,735
10.	Wimbledon Championships	$2,306,227	$0	$3,509,962
11.	Cincinnati Open	$255,220	$0	$3,765,182
12.	US Open	$230,000	$0	$3,945,182
Total prize money		$3,914,987	$30,195	$3,945,182
