= Anett Kontaveit =

Estonian tennis player (born 1995)

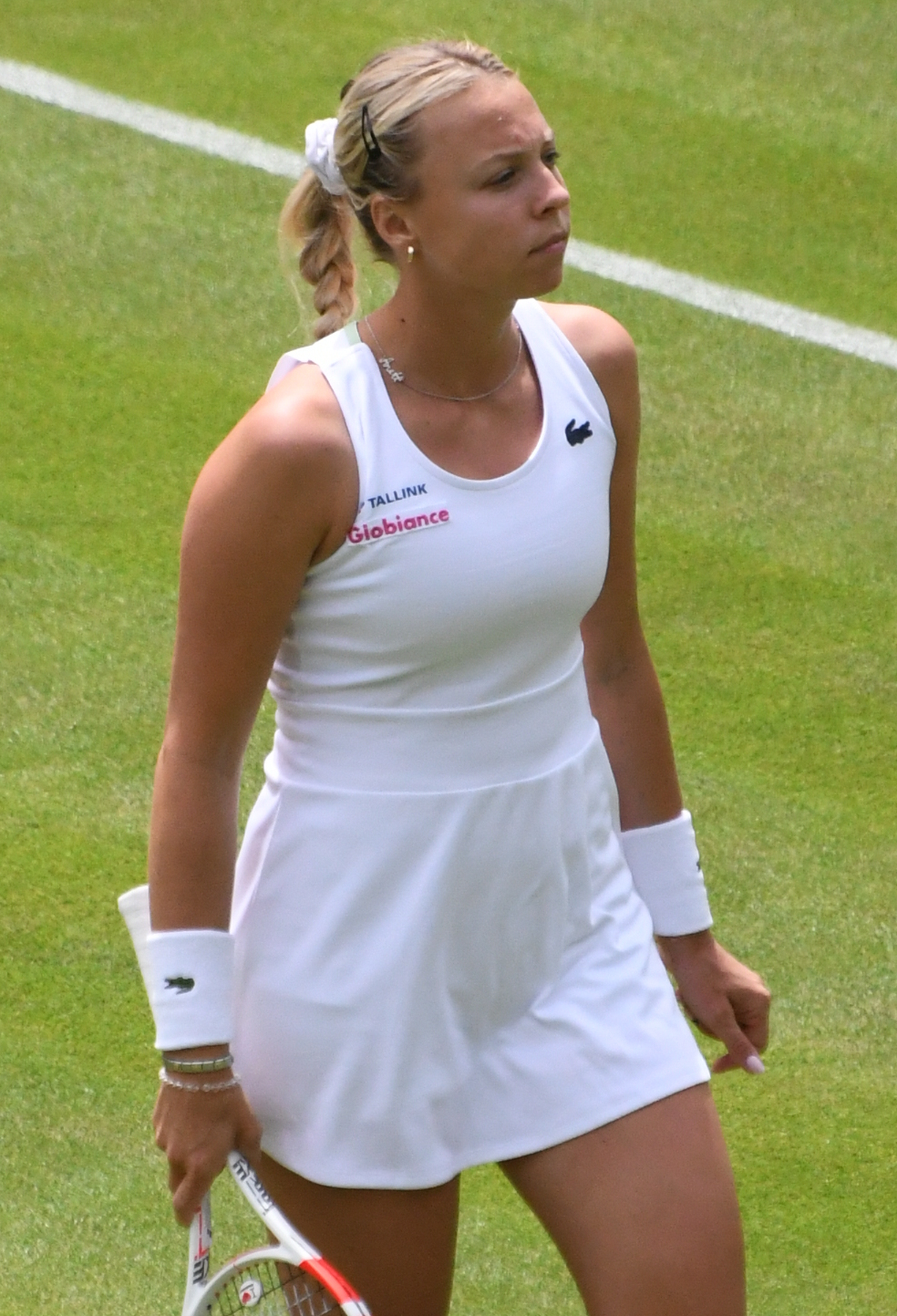
- Kontaveit at the 2022 Wimbledon Championships
- Country (sports): Estonia
- Born: 24 December 1995 (age 30) Tallinn, Estonia
- Height: 1.74 m (5 ft 9 in)
- Turned pro: 2010
- Retired: 2023
- Plays: Right-handed (two-handed backhand)
- Prize money: US$ 8,151,602
- Official website: anettkontaveit.ee

Singles
- Career record: 390–204
- Career titles: 6
- Highest ranking: No. 2 (6 June 2022)

Grand Slam singles results
- Australian Open: QF (2020)
- French Open: 4R (2018)
- Wimbledon: 3R (2017, 2018, 2019)
- US Open: 4R (2015, 2020)

Other tournaments
- Tour Finals: F (2021)
- Olympic Games: 1R (2020)

Doubles
- Career record: 55–45
- Career titles: 0
- Highest ranking: No. 95 (2 March 2020)

Grand Slam doubles results
- Australian Open: 2R (2019, 2020)
- French Open: 3R (2019)
- Wimbledon: 2R (2017, 2022)
- US Open: 2R (2019, 2021)

Grand Slam mixed doubles results
- Wimbledon: 1R (2023)

Team competitions
- Fed Cup: 26–17

Anett Kontaveit (Estonian pronunciation: [aˈnetː ˈkon.taˈveit]; born 24 December 1995) is an Estonian former professional tennis player. She was ranked as high as world No. 2 by the Women's Tennis Association (WTA), which she first achieved on 6 June 2022 to become the highest-ranked Estonian tennis player in history. She also attained a career-high ranking of No. 95 in doubles on 2 March 2020.

Kontaveit won six singles titles on the WTA Tour as well as eleven singles and five doubles titles on the ITF Circuit. She produced her best performance at a major by reaching the quarterfinals at the 2020 Australian Open, and she also contested two WTA 1000 finals at the 2018 Wuhan Open and 2022 Qatar Open. In 2021, after winning four titles in the span of seven tournaments between August and October, Kontaveit became the first Estonian to qualify for and participate in the WTA Finals, where she reached the final.

In June 2023, Kontaveit announced her retirement following her diagnosis of lumbar disc degeneration and she made her final professional appearance at the 2023 Wimbledon Championships, where she played her final match on 7 July 2023. She played her farewell match at Tondiraba Ice Hall in Tallinn, Estonia against her close friend Ons Jabeur on 11 November 2023.

== Career ==
=== 2011: First ITF Circuit title ===
Kontaveit had success on the junior tour in 2011, her best Grand Slam performance of the year being at Roland Garros. There, she made the quarterfinals with wins over world No. 6, Danka Kovinić, and future-Wimbledon junior champion, Ashleigh Barty. At the quarterfinal stage, she lost to Irina Khromacheva, the Wimbledon junior runner-up. She also won the European Under-16 Junior Championships partnering 14-year-old Tatjana Vorobjova in girls' doubles; they beat first seeded Czechs Barbora Krejčíková and Petra Rohanová.

Kontaveit also made some breakthroughs on the pro circuit; winning her maiden ITF title at her home event in Tallinn in January, beating Zuzana Luknárová in the final. She also made the finals in doubles, partnering compatriot Maret Ani.

Kontaveit was chosen for the 2011 Estonian Fed Cup team, but lost both of her singles matches in the World Group II tie against Spain.

In August, Kontaveit won her second title at the Savitaipale Open in Finland, where she beat Dutch player Lisanne van Riet in the final. She continued in October with a third $10k title at the Djursholm Tennis Club Stockholm Open as an unseeded player. She defeated top seed Marion Gaud in the quarterfinals, and then seventh seed Syna Kayser in the final. In December, Kontaveit won the Orange Bowl, a Grade-A tournament on the ITF Junior Circuit, where she beat Eugenie Bouchard and Yulia Putintseva (both with top 300 WTA rankings) en route to the title. Her junior ranking rose to her career high of No. 9.

=== 2012: Junior US Open final ===
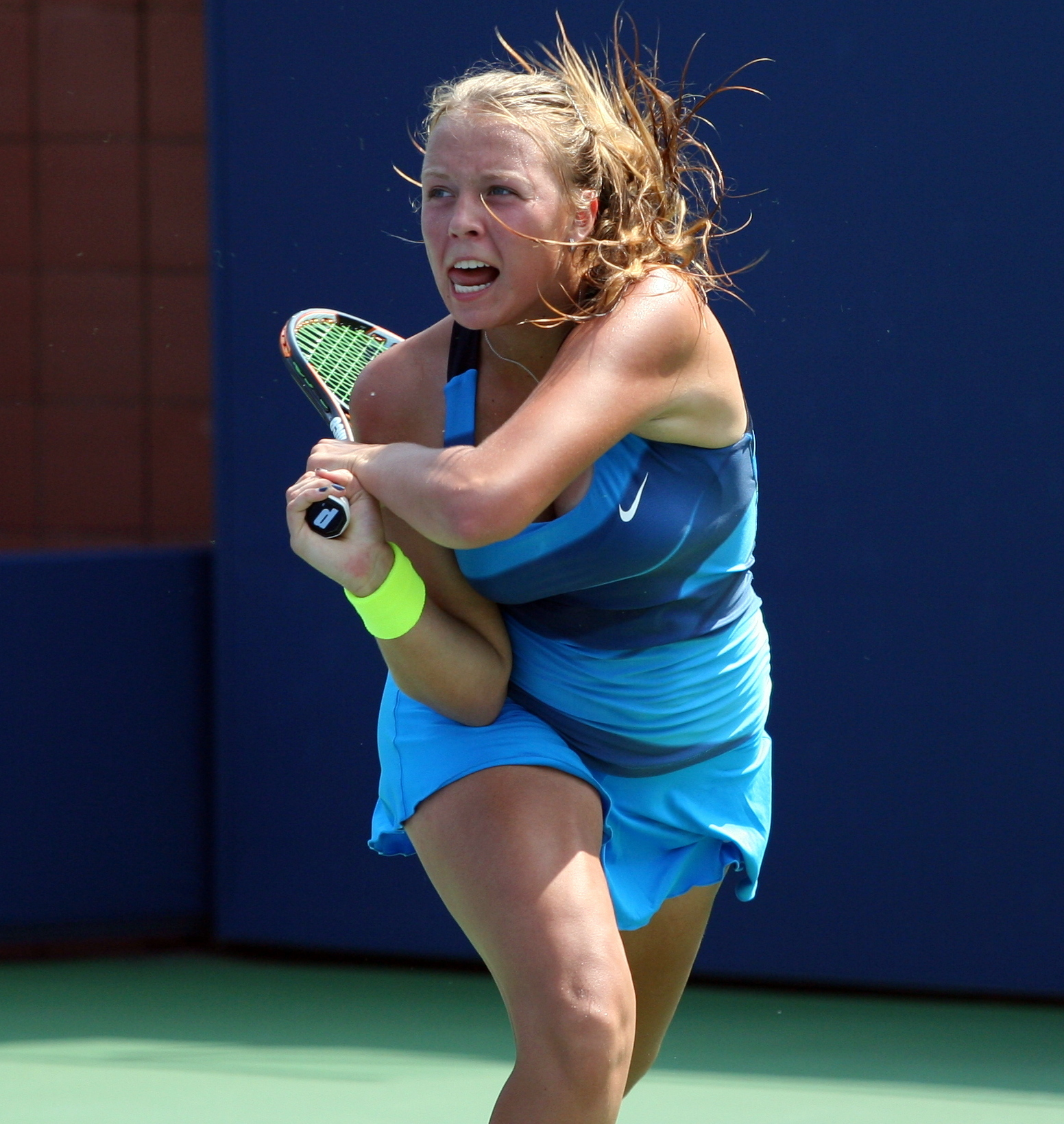
Kontaveit at the 2012 Junior US Open

Kontaveit began the year at the Traralgon International, an under-18 girls tournament in Australia. Seeded second, she reached the third round where she lost to Taylor Townsend. At the Junior Australian Open, she defeated Miho Kowase and Lee So-ra to advance to the third round, before losing once more to eventual champion Taylor Townsend.

For the second year, Kontaveit was chosen for the Estonian Fed Cup team- she played in the Europe/Africa Zone I, where she achieved two the biggest wins of her career at the time. She posted Estonia's only win against Austria and became the lowest ranked player to beat a top-50 player in seven years, with her straight-sets victory over Tamira Paszek of Austria- however Estonia failed to win either of their ties. In the relegation play-offs, she achieved Estonia's only win in their tie against the Netherlands over Bibiane Schoofs, but despite Kontaveit's performances, Estonia was relegated to the Fed Cup Europe/Africa Zone II.

Kontaveit was awarded a wildcard for the qualifying draw of her first WTA Tour tournament, the Danish Open in Copenhagen, where she won two qualifying matches, before losing in the final round of qualifying to Annika Beck.

She posted strong results at the junior major championships, reaching the semifinals of the French Open girls' singles, losing to eventual champion Annika Beck. At Wimbledon, she reached her second consecutive junior major semifinal, where she lost to the eventual champion Eugenie Bouchard.

In August, she won her fourth $10k title in San Luis Potosí, beating wildcard Victoria Rodríguez in the final, in straight sets.

Kontaveit became the first Estonian to reach the girls' singles finals at the US Open, but she was defeated in straight sets by Samantha Crawford.

=== 2013: Last junior year, top 250 ===
Kontaveit began her final year in junior tennis at the Australian Open. After some convincing wins, including over higher ranked opponents including Antonia Lottner and Anna Danilina, she lost in the semifinals to Kateřina Siniaková.

In March, Kontaveit received a wildcard into the main draw of the Miami Open due to her management deal with IMG. She lost to Christina McHale in straight sets.

She played the rest of the year at ITF tournaments, winning four titles from the five finals she reached- including her first $25k title in Moscow. These results helped her enter the world's top 250 for the first time at the age of 18.

=== 2014: ITF wins, mononucleosis ===
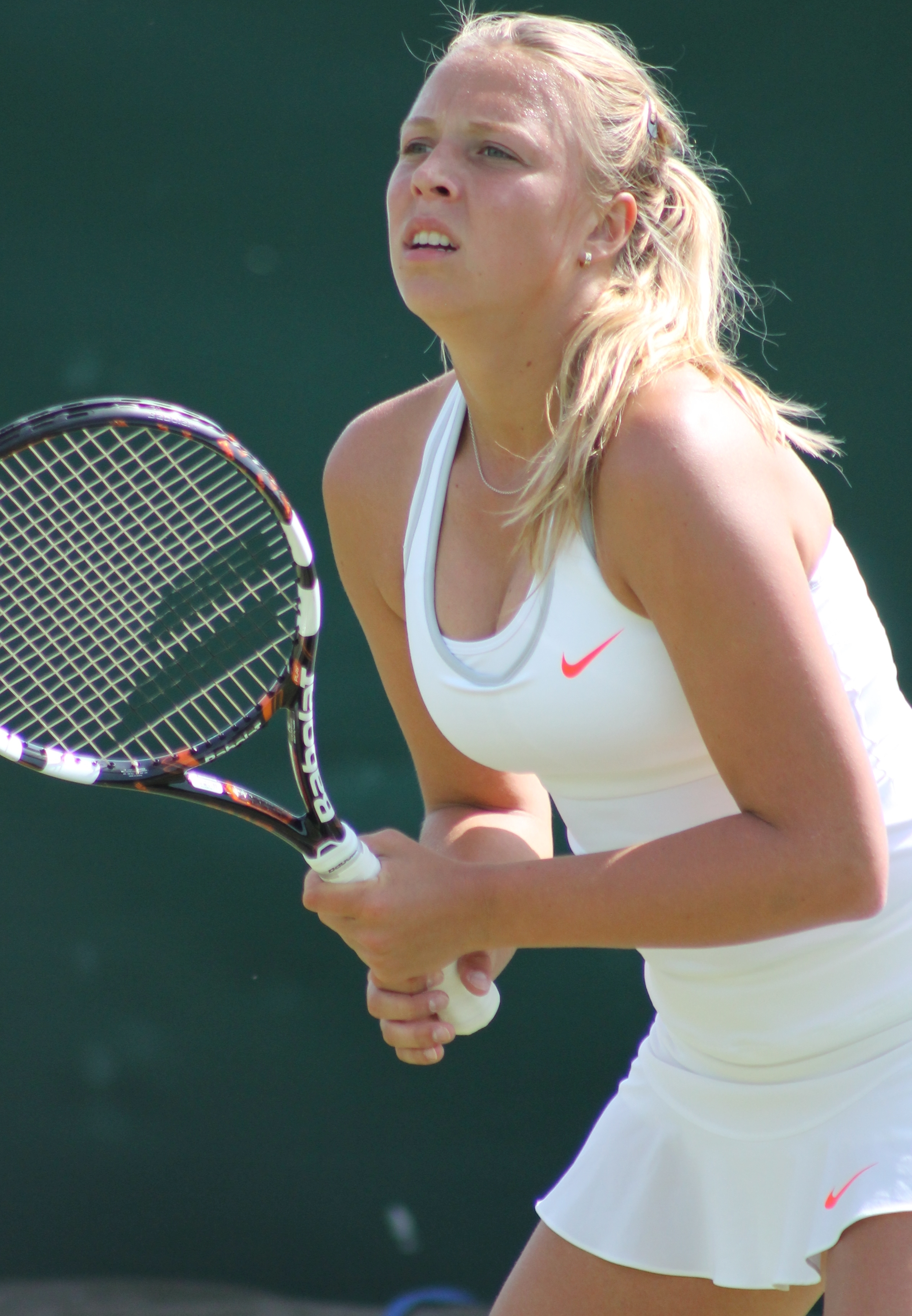
Kontaveit at the 2014 Wimbledon qualifying

Kontaveit started the year as No. 249 in the WTA rankings. In January, she qualified for her first WTA Tour tournament at the Auckland Open, losing to Sachie Ishizu in three sets in the first round of the main draw.

She then went on to play Fed Cup in Tallinn, winning 49 games in a row spanning three Fed Cup matches and two matches in the following week's ITF event in her hometown. After losing in the final to Timea Bacsinszky, she then played another ITF event in Moscow, where she lost in the final to Aliaksandra Sasnovich. After mediocre performances at the Miami Open and the WTA event in Monterrey, she performed well in a series of ITF tournaments on green clay in the United States. She held two match points to make the final of a tournament in Indian Harbour Beach, but lost the match to Taylor Townsend, who went on to win the tournament. Kontaveit lost in the final round of qualifying for the French Open.

Kontaveit qualified for Wimbledon for the first time in 2014. She held match point in the first round against Casey Dellacqua, but lost the match in three sets. She then qualified for the Swedish Open, beating top seed Alizé Cornet in the first round. She lost in the second round to Jana Čepelová.

Kontaveit travelled to North America and played in an ITF event in Vancouver, receiving a wildcard into the Canadian Open, however did not play again for the remainder of the year after being diagnosed with infectious mononucleosis. At the end of the season, Kontaveit found a new coach in Australian Paul McNamee, and began training in Istanbul at the KozaWOS Academy.

=== 2015: Recovery, US Open fourth round and top 100 ===
After an extended training block in Australia to end 2014, Kontaveit's first tournament since the Canadian Open was the Auckland Open, where she lost to Urszula Radwańska in three sets. She then played her first Australian Open, defeating Paula Kania in the first round of qualifying before losing a close match against Evgeniya Rodina.

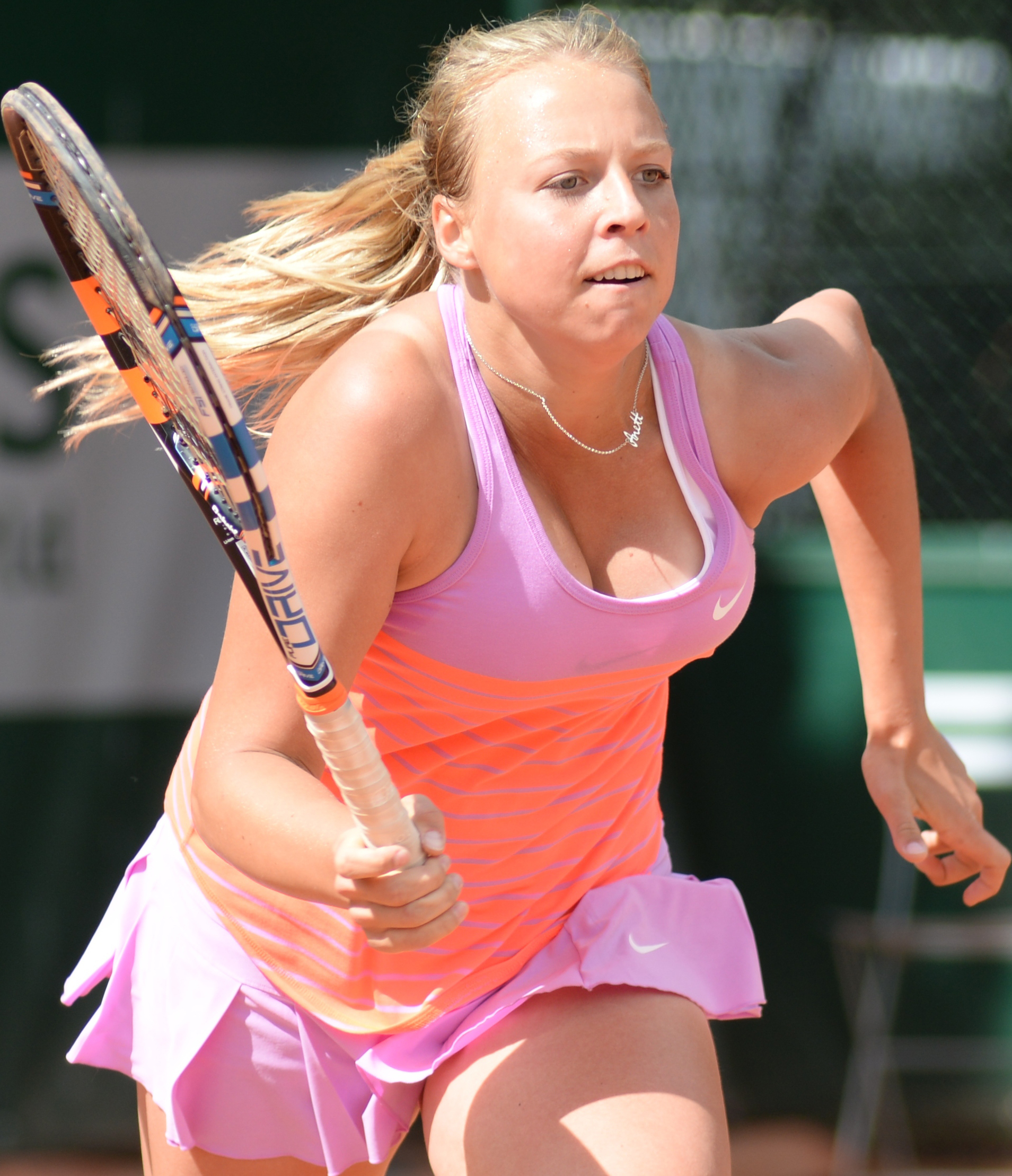
Kontaveit at the 2015 French Open

Kontaveit returned to Estonia to play in the Fed Cup, seemingly still suffering from illness as she put in poor performances and struggled to beat much lower ranked opponents. She made a strong return to the ITF Circuit at her training base in Istanbul, where she made the semifinals, her equal best result before losing to Shahar Pe'er. She then went to Wiesbaden in Germany, where she was routed by Adrijana Lekaj, winning only three games. Kontaveit then headed to La Marsa, Tunisia where she lost to Romina Oprandi at the semifinal stage. Participating in the French Open qualifying again, she defeated Katerina Stewart, before losing to French wildcard Clothilde de Bernardi.

Kontaveit transferred to the grass in Eastbourne, and won the $50k event, her biggest ITF title so far, without losing a set. She then continued this form in Surbiton, making the semifinals before losing a three-set match to Naomi Osaka. She then qualified and made the semifinals in Ilkley, beating players including Zhu Lin, Jeļena Ostapenko and Wang Yafan. However, she lost to Magda Linette after leading 5–1 in the third set and holding a match point. Despite this loss, Kontaveit had the most wins of any player on grass, and this form granted her a main-draw wildcard to the Wimbledon Championships. She lost in the first round to the former world No. 1, Victoria Azarenka.

Kontaveit played three WTA tournaments after Wimbledon, the Swedish Open, İstanbul Cup and Baku Cup. Despite disappointing showings in the singles including losses to Olga Govortsova, Melis Sezer and Karin Knapp, she made her first WTA semifinal in doubles in Istanbul, partnering Elizaveta Kulichkova after being offered a wildcard. At the Vancouver Open, Kontaveit qualified and beat Zhang Shuai and Patricia Maria Țig before losing to Alla Kudryavtseva in the quarterfinals.

Kontaveit had her first Grand Slam breakthrough at the US Open. Starting as an unseeded player in qualifying, she beat Stephanie Vogt, María Teresa Torró Flor and Naomi Broady to qualify for the main draw. There, Kontaveit then beat Casey Dellacqua, 31st seed Anastasia Pavlyuchenkova and Madison Brengle to reach the fourth round proper, where she lost to 23rd seed Venus Williams, in straight sets. With this result Kontaveit broke into the top 100 for the first time, moving up over 60 places.

She finished the year by participating in WTA tournaments in Guangzhou, Tashkent and Luxembourg. However, a thigh injury hindered her performance at the latter events and she ended her season with a retirement in qualifying in Luxembourg.

=== 2016: Out of the top 100 ===
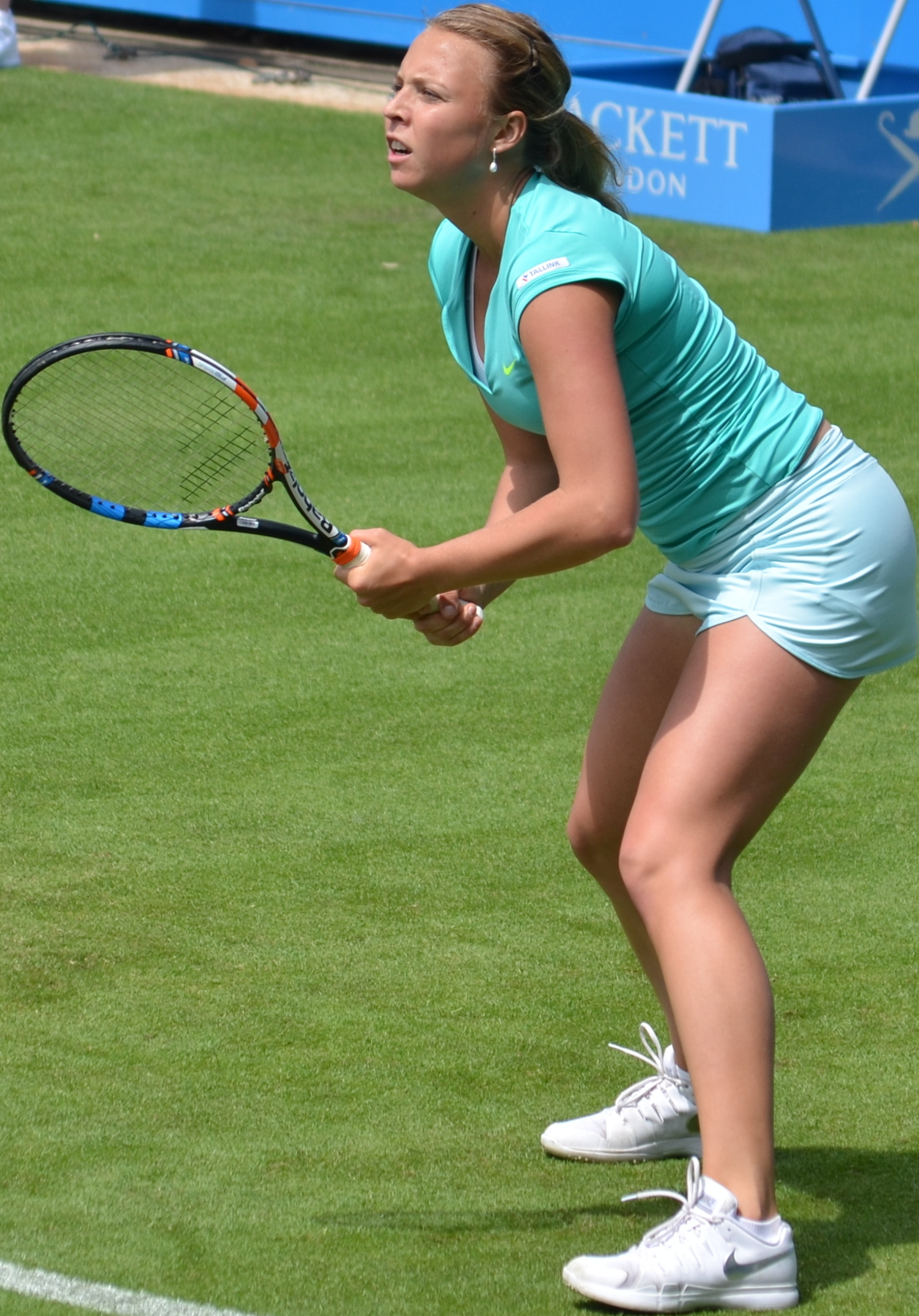
Kontaveit at the 2016 Eastbourne International

Kontaveit started the season with a quarterfinal run at the Shenzhen Open before losing in the first round of the Australian Open to Garbiñe Muguruza. After losing in the first round of the Mexican Open to No. 4 seed Johanna Konta, she reached the semifinals in Monterrey, losing there to Kirsten Flipkens; however, she failed to qualify for both Indian Wells and Miami. She also lost in the first round of the French Open to Venus Williams.

During her grass-court season, Kontaveit reached the quarterfinals at the Nottingham Open (losing to Alison Riske) and qualified for the Eastbourne International (losing in the first round to Anna-Lena Friedsam) before losing in the first round of the Wimbledon Championships to Barbora Strýcová. Her next six tournaments (including the US Open) also ended in early exits; therefore, her ranking plummeted and she fell from the top 100. Her best year-end performance was a semifinal run in the Guangzhou International Open.

=== 2017: First WTA title and top 40 ===
Kontaveit started season ranked 121. Her first tournament was the Australian Open and she was named one of the seven alternates through on the entry list, but a number of withdrawals that did not qualify to the main draw. She lost to Maria Sakkari in the first round. She then won the Open Andrézieux-Bouthéon 42, beating Ivana Jorović in the final. After that, she entered the Hungarian Ladies Open's main draw as a qualifier, losing to eventual semifinalist Julia Görges in the first round.

At the Indian Wells Open, Kontaveit entered the main draw as a qualifier and beat world No. 47, Misaki Doi, in the first round, before falling to No. 19 seed Anastasia Pavlyuchenkova. Her next tournament was the Miami Open, where, once again as a qualifier, she beat Kurumi Nara and recorded an upset over No. 32 seed and world No. 35, Ekaterina Makarova, before losing to No. 3 seed, Simona Halep in straight sets. Ranked No. 99, Kontaveit reached her first WTA Tour-level final at her next tournament, the Ladies Open Biel Bienne, beating former world No. 38, Heather Watson, Evgeniya Rodina, Elise Mertens, and Aliaksandra Sasnovich en route. She then lost to fellow first time finalist Markéta Vondroušová. Good results followed as she qualified for Stuttgart and reached the quarterfinals there. As a qualifier, she also entered into Madrid and Rome, reaching the quarterfinals in the latter which was her first Premier 5-quarterfinal. She lost to Simona Halep but beat world No. 1, Angelique Kerber, en route. She followed that with a second-round appearance at the French Open, beating Monica Niculescu before losing to Garbiñe Muguruza.

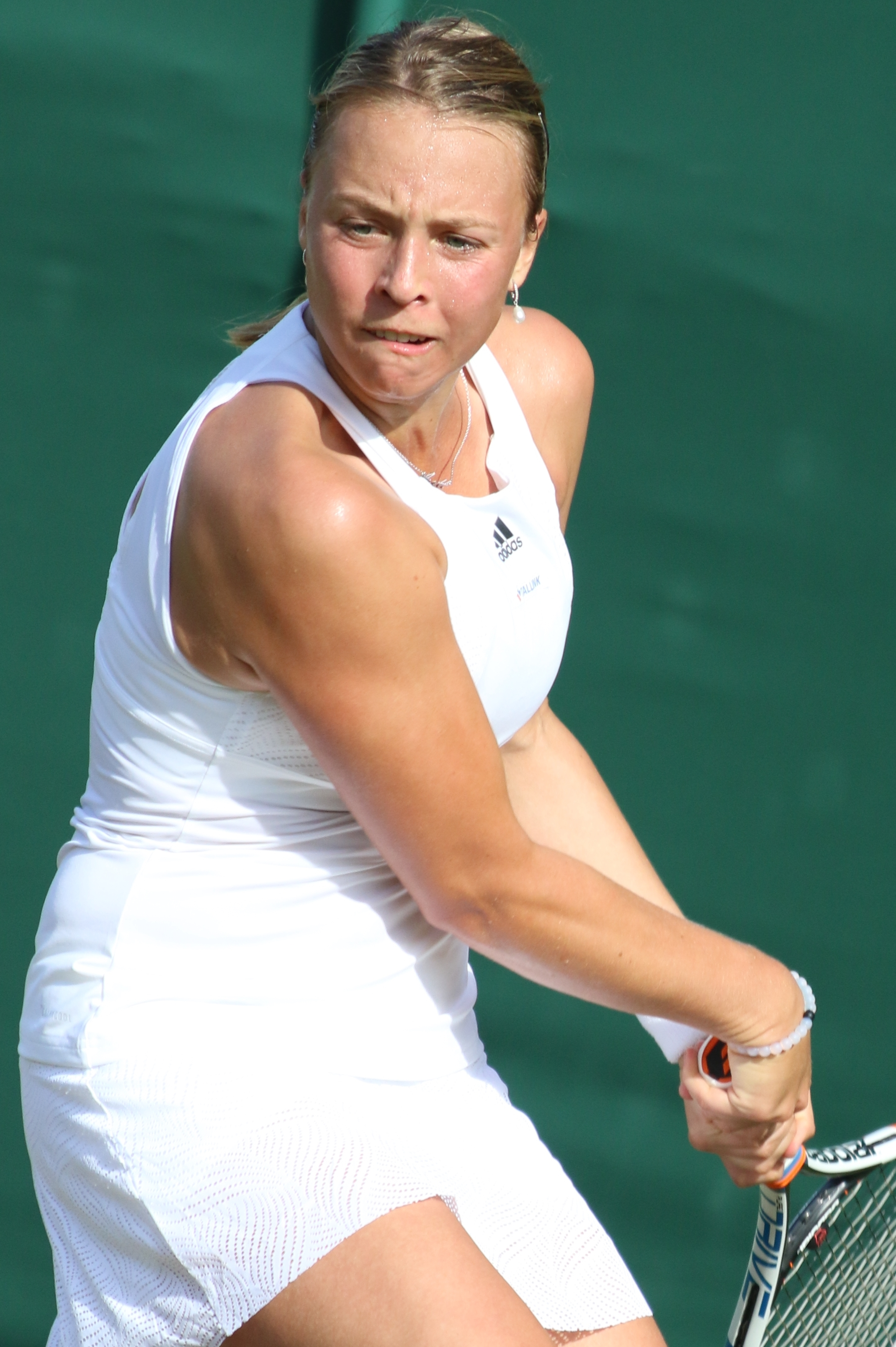
Kontaveit at the 2017 Wimbledon Championships

At her first grass-court tournament of 2017, the Rosmalen Open, Kontaveit reached her second final of the year. En-route she scored wins over sixth seed Kristýna Plíšková, former Wimbledon semifinalist Kirsten Flipkens, Carina Witthöft and seventh seed Lesia Tsurenko. In the final, she got past Natalia Vikhlyantseva to clinch her maiden WTA tournament title and ensure a top-40 debut.

=== 2018: First Premier-5 final ===
Kontaveit began the new season at the Brisbane International losing in second round to Aliaksandra Sasnovich. At Sydney, she retired in the qualifying due to heatstroke.

At the Australian Open, she defeated Aleksandra Krunić and Mona Barthel to advance to the third round where she faced world No. 7, Jeļena Ostapenko. Kontaveit defeated her to advance to the fourth round in Melbourne for the first time; however, she lost to Carla Suárez Navarro.

In spring on clay courts, she reached semifinals of Stuttgart and also in Rome, where she defeated world No. 9, Venus Williams, and world No. 2, Caroline Wozniacki, in the same tournament. At the French Open, she was seeded 25th and reached the fourth round for the second Grand Slam tournament in a row losing to eventual finalist Sloane Stephens.

Kontaveit hired Nigel Sears as her new coach at the start of the grass-court season but failed to defend her Rosmalen Open title, losing in the first round to Veronika Kudermetova. She reached the third round of Wimbledon losing to Alison Van Uytvanck.

At the Rogers Cup, she lost to Petra Kvitová in straight sets, and lost in the third round of the Cincinnati Open to eventual winner Kiki Bertens. At the US Open, she lost in the first round to Katarina Siniaková.

On 1 October 2018, she reached her best singles ranking of No. 21, after finishing runner-up at the Wuhan Open. During the tournament, she beat Sloane Stephens, Donna Vekić, Zhang Shuai, Katarina Siniaková and Wang Qiang to reach the final where she lost in straight sets to Aryna Sabalenka.

She received a bye into the second round of the China Open, after reaching the final of Wuhan. She was later defeated by Caroline Wozniacki in the third round. She finished the season being eliminated in the round-robin stage of the WTA Elite Trophy, after losing to Elise Mertens and beating Julia Görges.

=== 2019: Miami Open semifinal, top 15, and illness ===
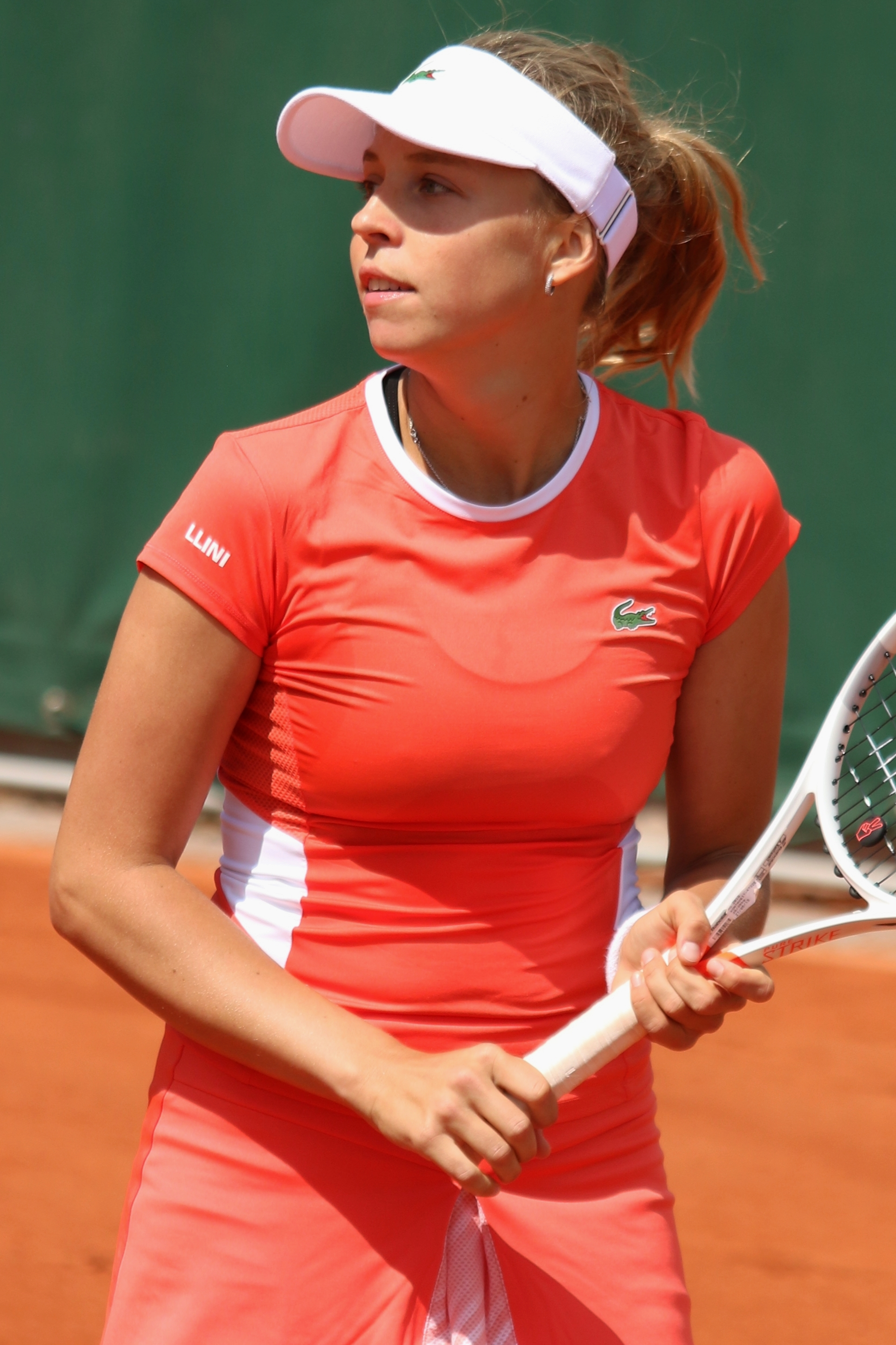
Kontaveit at the 2019 French Open

Kontaveit started the year by reaching the quarterfinals of the Brisbane International beating Suarez Navarro and Kvitová before losing to eventual finalist Lesia Tsurenko. She then lost to Elise Mertens in the second round of the Sydney International. Seeded 20th at the Australian Open, she won against Sara Sorribes Tormo and lost in the second round to Aliaksandra Sasnovich.

During the Middle Eastern swing, she lost in the second round of the Qatar Open to Angelique Kerber. Seeded 15th at the Dubai Tennis Championships, she lost in the first round to Zhang Shuai.

Kontaveit then moved onto the Sunshine Double tournaments at Indian Wells and Miami. Seeded 21st, she reached the fourth round at Indian losing to Karolína Plíšková in three sets. She then made her breakthrough at the Miami Open. Seeded again 21st, she defeated Amanda Anisimova, Ajla Tomljanović and Indian Wells champion Bianca Andreescu to reach her first Premier Mandatory quarterfinal. She defeated 27th seed Hsieh Su-wei despite trailing in the third set. She then faced Ashleigh Barty but lost in straight sets. These results propelled her ranking from No. 20 to 14 and made her the highest ranked Estonian player in history, male or female, and surpassed compatriot Kaia Kanepi's career-high rank of No. 15.

At her first clay-court event of the season, she was seeded eighth; at the Porsche Tennis Grand Prix, she defeated Caroline García in two sets to face Anastasia Pavlyuchenkova in a rematch of last years quarterfinal. She defeated her in straight sets to reach the quarterfinals for the third year in a row and face Victoria Azarenka, who retired in the third set. This meant, she reached the semifinals for the second year running and was due to face world No. 1, Naomi Osaka. However, Osaka withdrew with an abdominal injury handing Kontaveit a walkover to the final to face Petra Kvitová. She lost the final in two sets.

She was seeded 14th at the Madrid Open, however, lost in the first round to Aliaksandra Sasnovich in three sets. Her next event was the Italian Open where she was seeded 15th. She defeated Mona Barthel to face Maria Sakkari in the second round. However, she lost in straight sets. Her results meant she was seeded 17th at the French Open, her best seeding at a major event but she lost there in the first round to Karolina Muchová.

Her first grass-court match ended in defeat to seventh seed Johanna Konta at the Birmingham Classic. Seeded 16th at Eastbourne, she came from a set down to defeat wildcarded Harriet Dart in the first round to set up a second-round clash with Anna-Lena Friedsam. She was defeated in straight sets.

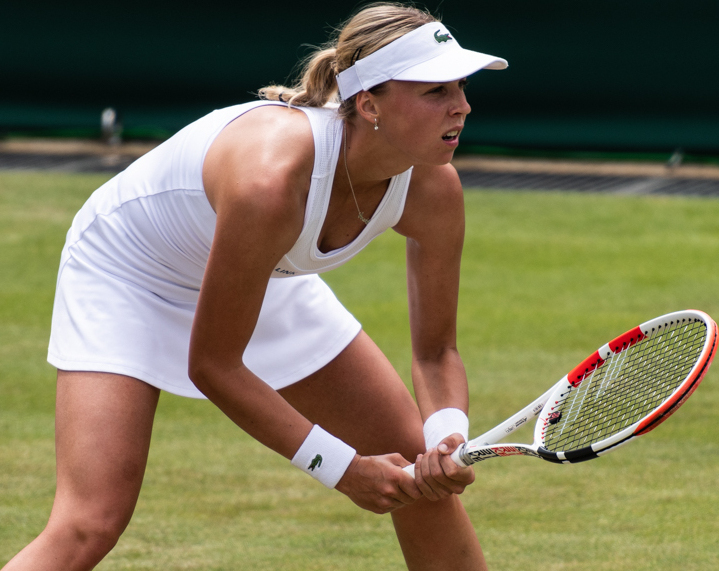
Kontaveit at the 2019 Wimbledon Championships

At Wimbledon, she was the 20th seed, and defeated Shelby Rogers in the first round to face Heather Watson. She defeated her in two sets to face Karolina Muchová in the third round; she lost to the Czech in two sets.

After taking the next month off she returned at the Rogers Cup where she is the 16th seed. Her first match was against the wildcarded Maria Sharapova. She defeated her in an epic two-hour and 40-minute match. She won a 17-minute service game to break Sharapova and to serve for the match. In the second round, she defeated Suárez Navarro who retired in the second set. She lost to third seed Karolína Plíšková in the third round.

At the Cincinnati Open, she defeated 13th seed Angelique Kerber in the first round to face Polish teenager Iga Świątek in round two. She defeated her in two sets to face the top seed and world No. 2, Ash Barty in round three. She lost in three tight sets, despite serving for the match in the final set. With this results she secured her the 21st seed at the US Open.

At the US Open, Kontaveit opened the tournament with a win against Sorribes Tormo. She defeated Ajla Tomljanović in the second round but withdrew from her third-round match against 13th seed Belinda Bencic with a viral illness.

She withdrew from two Premier events, in Zhengzhou and the Pan Pacific Open. She also withdrew from the Wuhan Open where she had reached the final in 2018. Her withdrawal meant that she would drop down the rankings with points being deducted from last year. She later revealed on Instagram that she had been suffering from an ongoing illness and a small operation. She said, she may return in time for either Linz or the Kremlin Cup but withdrew from both.

=== 2020: First major quarterfinal, consistency ===
Kontaveit began the season at the Brisbane International defeating Hsieh Su-wei but losing to sixth seed Kiki Bertens in three sets. At Adelaide, she lost to Pavlyuchenkova in the first round, in straight sets. As the 28th seed at the Australian Open, she defeated Astra Sharma and Sorribes Tormo and then crushed Belinda Bencic, losing only one game, to reach the fourth round for the second time in her career. She then defeated Iga Świątek in three sets to give Kontaveit a place in the quarterfinals where she lost to Simona Halep. However, with her win in the fourth round against Iga Świątek, she became the first Estonian, male or female, to reach a quarterfinal at the Australian Open, and with this tournament's result she moved up nine places in the WTA rankings to 22. She next went to Dubai where she made the quarterfinals but lost to Petra Martić.

At the first Premier 5 tournament at Doha, she defeated Anastasija Sevastova in straight sets before losing to ninth seed and eventual champion, Aryna Sabalenka, in a tight three-set match.

Kontaveit returned to the tour at Palermo, the first WTA tournament during the coronavirus pandemic. She was seeded fourth and defeated in her first match Patricia Maria Țig. In the second round, she defeated Laura Siegemund in three sets to face Elisabetta Cocciaretto in the quarterfinals. She also beat the Italian wildcard in three sets to reach her first semifinal of the season against top seed Petra Martić. She defeated the Croatian in two sets to advance to her first final of the season. There, she was defeated by Frenchwoman Fiona Ferro in two sets despite serving for the second set. Nevertheless, the run to the final saw Kontaveit return to the top 20.

Seeded 12th at the Cincinnati Open, she defeated former top-ten player Daria Kasatkina, Jil Teichmann, and Marie Bouzková, to set up a quarterfinal clash against former world No. 1, Naomi Osaka. Despite leading by a set and a break she eventually lost the match in three sets.

Seeded 14th at the US Open, she defeated Danielle Collins in the first round in three sets. In the second round, she beat Slovenian teenager Kaja Juvan and 24th Magda Linette to reach the fourth round of the US Open for a second time to face fourth seeded Osaka. However, she was not able to avenge her prior defeat, falling to the eventual champion in straight sets.

She then played at the Italian Open, where she defeated Caroline Garcia, in straight sets, in the first round, before falling to Svetlana Kuznetsova in the second. At the French Open, Kontaveit again faced Garcia in the first round. Unfortunately, Garcia managed to clinch her revenge against the 17th seed, who suffered a disappointing loss in three sets, culminating the season. Her final event of the season was the Ostrava Open where she defeated Ekaterina Alexandrova in three sets before losing to Sara Sorribes Tormo, in straight sets.

=== 2021: Four titles, WTA Finals runner-up & top 10 ===
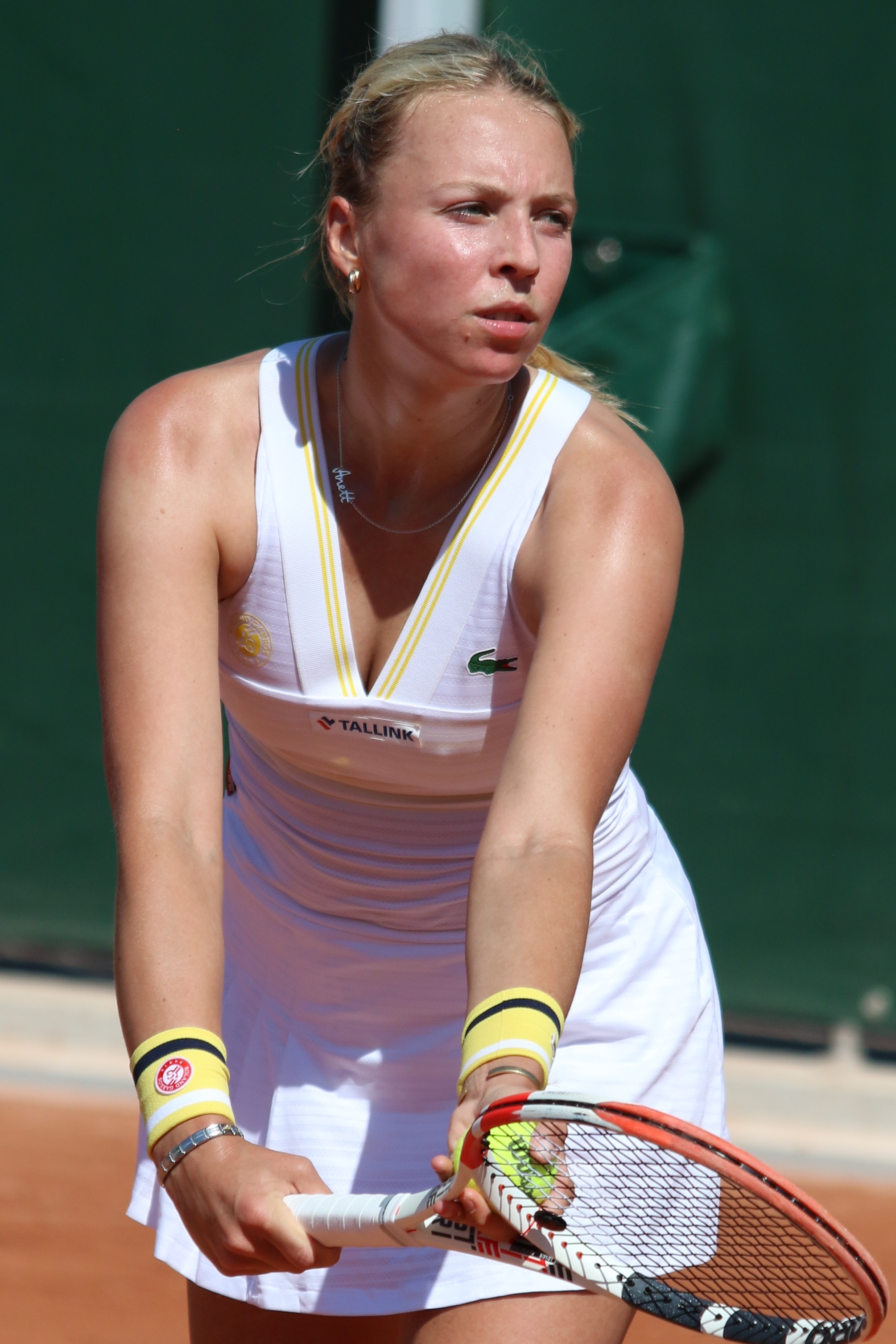
Kontaveit at the 2021 French Open

Kontaveit started the new season at the WTA 500 event in Abu Dhabi as the tenth seed, losing to Veronika Kudermetova in straight sets.

In Australia, Kontaveit was placed in hard quarantine with 72 other players due to the COVID-19 pandemic, meaning she wasn't allowed to practice for the upcoming Australian Open and had to stay in her hotel room for 14 days. She played the WTA 500 Grampians Trophy where she defeated Christina McHale, Bethanie Mattek-Sands and Maria Sakkari to reach the final against American Ann Li. However, the final wasn't played due to scheduling difficulties. Seeded 21st at the Australian Open, she defeated Aliaksandra Sasnovich in straight sets, and Heather Watson in three to reach the third round. She then was defeated by Shelby Rogers in straight sets, despite holding a 4–1 lead in the first set. Next was the Middle Eastern swing. At the WTA 500 Qatar Ladies Open, she defeated seventh seed and 2021 Australian Open finalist Jennifer Brady in 57 minutes to progress. She then beat former world No. 1 and three-time Grand Slam champion, Angelique Kerber, in an hour, to reach the quarterfinals where she lost in three sets to the eventual champion, Petra Kvitová. At the WTA 1000 Dubai Championships, she defeated Tímea Babos and Sorana Cîrstea to reach the third round. She then lost to third-seeded Aryna Sabalenka, in straight sets.

At the Miami Open, she was seeded 22nd and defeated Sorana Cîrstea in three sets to reach the third round against the 16th seed Elise Mertens, losing again in three sets. Her ranking would drop a few spots, because she was defending semifinal points from the 2019 edition of the tournament. Her next tournament was the 2021 Porsche Tennis Grand Prix where she was the 2019 finalist. In her first-round match, she defeated a qualifier, German teenager Julia Middendorf, to set up a match against the world No. 4 and third seed, Sofia Kenin. She upset the American to reach the quarterfinals, a feat she had achieved in her four previous main-draw appearances at the tournament. In the quarterfinals, she lost to Aryna Sabalenka in three sets. Shortly after the tournament Kontaveit and Nigel Sears announced an amicable coaching split after three years together.

In Madrid, she defeated Serbian qualifier Nina Stojanović to reach the second, where she was defeated by the 16th seed Maria Sakkari, in straight sets. She withdrew from the Italian Open due to exhaustion, and did not play another lead up clay-court tournament in the weeks till Roland Garros. Seeded 30th at the French Open, she defeated Viktorija Golubic in three sets to progress to the second round where she defeated Kristina Mladenovic in two sets to reach the third round. There, she lost to the defending champion and eighth seed Iga Świątek. Her next tournament was the WTA 500 grass-court event in Eastbourne. She defeated Svetlana Kuznetsova and then third seed Bianca Andreescu, her second top-10 win of the season and 13th overall, to reach the quarterfinals. There, she beat again Golubic in three tough sets to reach her second semifinal of the season against Camila Giorgi. She reached the final after Giorgi's retirement but lost to Jeļena Ostapenko. At Wimbledon, she was defeated in the first round by Markéta Vondroušová, in three sets.

Her debut at the Olympic Games in Tokyo was cut short, after being defeated by Maria Sakkari in the first round despite leading in the opening set. Her next tournament was the Canadian Open edition of the Rogers Cup in Canada where she was defeated by American Jessica Pegula in the opening round despite leading by a set and a break.

She started a coaching trial with former player Dmitry Tursunov, ex-coach of Aryna Sabalenka. At the Cincinnati Open she was defeated by world No. 20, Ons Jabeur, in the first round. Her results improved the following week at the WTA 250 Cleveland tournament. As the second seed she defeated Lauren Davis, Caroline Garcia, Kateřina Siniaková and Sara Sorribes Tormo to reach her third final of the season against Irina-Camelia Begu. She defeated Begu in straight sets to win her second career title. Seeded 28th at the US Open, she reached the third round for the third time at a Grand Slam championship for the season where she lost again to seventh seed Iga Świątek.

At the Ostrava Open, she won her third WTA title of her career and the second in the season without losing a set. She defeated No. 3 seed, Belinda Bencic, in the quarterfinals, the local favorite, world No. 10, tournament No. 2 seed, Petra Kvitová, in the semifinals (her third top-10 win of the season) and No. 4 seed Maria Sakkari in the final (her fifth top-20 win of the season). This was the biggest WTA Tour title of the season and of her career since her first title in 2017.

At the Chicago Open, she defeated Madison Brengle in straight sets, then withdrew before her second-round match citing a thigh strain. Her next tournament was at Indian Wells where she was seeded 18th. In her first-round match, she defeated Martina Trevisan to face the 16th seed and defending champion Bianca Andreescu. She defeated the Canadian to reach the fourth round for the second time in her career. She then defeated qualifier Beatriz Haddad Maia to reach the quarterfinals for the first time. She lost out to Ons Jabeur in straight sets. This result meant she returned to the top 20 again, the first time since 2020.

Kontaveit's next tournament was the Kremlin Cup, where she took a wildcard. As the ninth seed, she defeated Kateřina Siniaková and Andrea Petkovic to reach the quarterfinals. She demolished Garbiñe Muguruza to reach the semifinals. She defeated Olympic silver medalist Markéta Vondroušová in straight sets to reach her fifth final of the season. There she defeated Ekaterina Alexandrova in three sets (coming from four games down in the second set) to win her third title of the season and fourth WTA title. This result propelled her back to 14th in the world and equal her career high. It also put her in contention of reaching the WTA Finals, as she reached tenth in the race.

Kontaveit then headed to the Transylvania Open. As the second seed in Cluj-Napoca, she defeated Aleksandra Krunić, Alison Van Uytvanck, Anhelina Kalinina and Rebecca Peterson to reach her sixth final of the year. She defeated Simona Halep in straight sets in the final, winning her fourth title of the year (all coming within the space of her last seven tournaments). Her victory in the final was her 26th in her last 28 matches. As a result, Kontaveit secured the final spot at the 2021 WTA Finals, surpassing Jabeur, whilst also guaranteeing her top-10 debut, reaching a new career high of world No. 8, on 1 November 2021. Kontaveit lost to Garbiñe Muguruza during the round robin stage, but defeated Barbora Krejčíková and Karolína Plíšková, in straight sets, to finish first in her group and advance to the semifinals. She then defeated Maria Sakkari to reach the biggest final of her career, posting a 7–0 undefeated record in semifinals this year. She became the first Estonian tennis player, male or female, to qualify and reach the final of a year-end tournament. Her semifinal win over Sakkari was her 48th win of the season, tying Ons Jabeur for the most wins in 2021. She lost to Muguruza in the championship match, finishing her breakout season ranked No. 7 in the world.

=== 2022: World No. 2, coaching change, struggles after COVID, sixth title ===
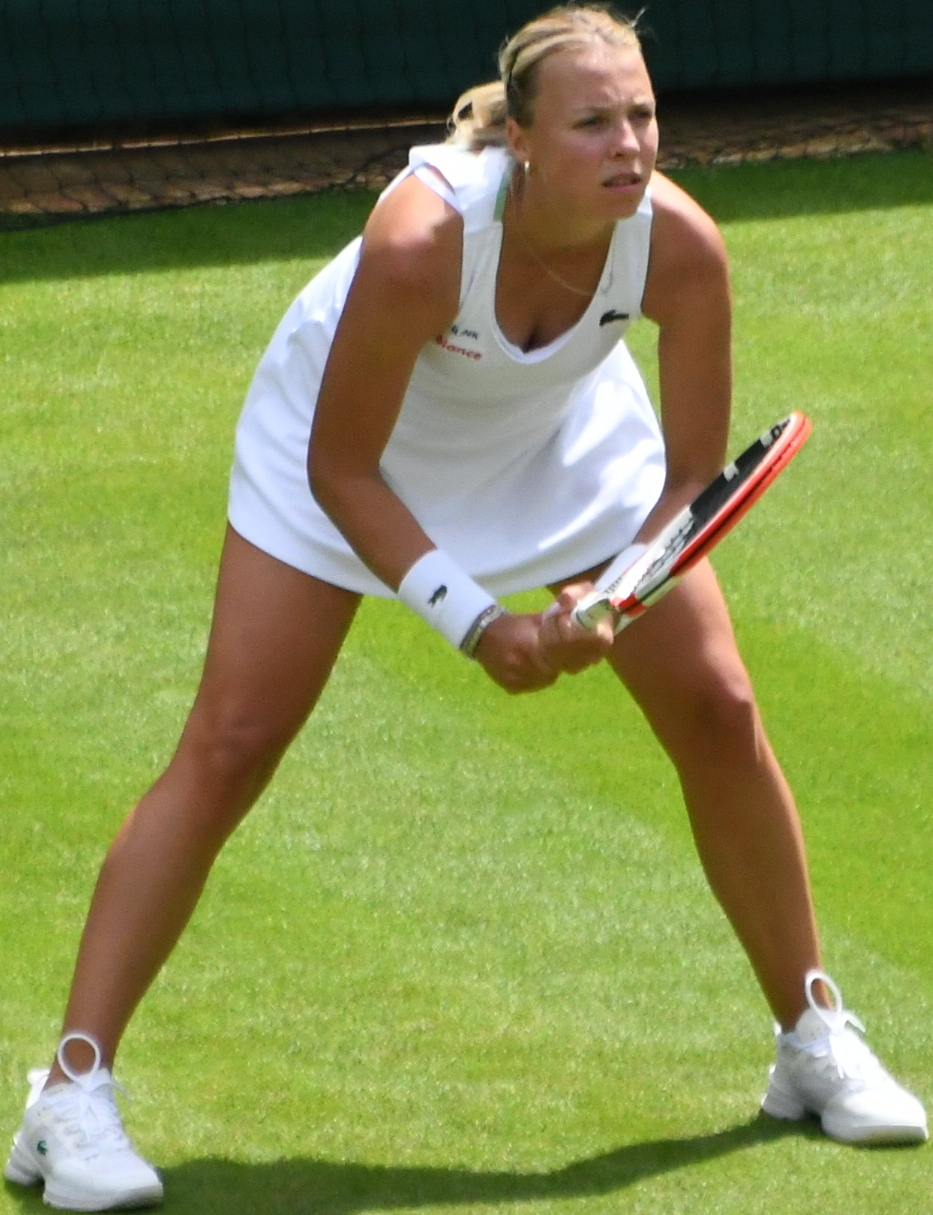
Kontaveit at the 2022 Wimbledon Championships

Kontaveit started at the Sydney International as the fourth seed. She began her campaign by defeating Zhang Shuai, Elena-Gabriela Ruse, and Ons Jabeur to reach the semifinals. However, she was defeated by third seed Barbora Krejčíková, in the final set tiebreaker, despite having seven match points.

Seeded No. 7 at the Australian Open, she was considered a favourite following her run of form at the end of 2021. She defeated Kateřina Siniaková in the first round but was upset by Danish teenager and rising star, Clara Tauson, in the second.

Continuing a streak of indoor hardcourt wins in 2021, Kontaveit won the St. Petersburg Ladies' Trophy as the second seed, reaching the final after defeating Jil Teichmann, Sorana Cîrstea, Belinda Bencic, and Jeļena Ostapenko. She defeated the top seed, Maria Sakkari, in the final, in three sets, and reached a career high of No. 5.

Kontaveit then played at the Qatar Ladies Open, and defeated Ana Konjuh, Elise Mertens, Ons Jabeur, and recent Dubai Tennis Championships champion, Jeļena Ostapenko, to reach the final. This was her second WTA 1000 final- after Wuhan in 2018. She was defeated by Iga Świątek. This run helped her ranking rise to a career-high of No. 4 in the world.

Kontaveit then experienced a drop in form, losing in the third and second rounds at the Sunshine Double- falling to 30th seed Markéta Vondroušová at Indian Wells and an unseeded American player, Ann Li, in Miami. At the Stuttgart Grand Prix, she reached the quarterfinals, before she lost to Aryna Sabalenka in three sets, in a rematch of last year's quarterfinal. She then withdrew from the Madrid Open after contracting COVID-19; this period of illness led to her reporting fitness struggles such as breathing issues throughout the summer months. Upon her return, she participated at the Italian Open where she lost to Petra Martić in the second round, after receiving a bye in the first round.

As the fifth seed at the French Open, Kontaveit lost to Ajla Tomljanović in the first round. Despite this, she reached a career-high ranking of world No. 2 on 6 June 2022. She announced her split with her coach Dmitry Tursunov following the conclusion of the tournament as he has difficulty traveling to events with her due to visa difficulties of people holding Russian citizenship. Kontaveit later revealed that she had COVID-19 after Stuttgart, which affected her game in the next tournaments in Rome and French Open. She played no warm-up tournaments on grass in the lead up to the 2022 Wimbledon Championships. Kontaveit started working with a new coach, German Torben Beltz.

At Wimbledon, as second seed, she defeated Bernarda Pera in the first round but lost to unseeded Jule Niemeier in the second.

Kontaveit received a late wildcard entry into Hamburg European Open where she defeated Irina Bara and Rebecca Peterson to reach quarterfinals. Then she reached semifinals after Andrea Petkovic retired. After that, she beat Anastasia Potapova to reach her third final of the season and first since February. In the final, she lost to Bernarda Pera.

At the US Open, Kontaveit came into the tournament as the second seed and beat Jaqueline Cristian in the first round. She was then defeated in the second round by 23-time major champion Serena Williams, who was playing in her final tournament; the match went three sets and lasted two and a half hours. With Williams subsequently losing her next match, it meant that Kontaveit became the final player to ever be beaten by her in a professional match. It completed Kontaveit's subpar major record in 2022, having never made it past the second round, the first such result since 2016.

Kontaveit was the top seed at the inaugural edition of her home tournament, the Tallinn Open. She reached the final defeating compatriot Kaia Kanepi in the semifinals, before losing to seventh seed Barbora Krejčíková in straight sets. At the Ostrava Open, Kontaveit entered as the defending champion and the third seed, but retired after dropping the first set to unseeded Tereza Martincová in her first match. She announced she was ending her 2022 season due to a back injury shortly after.

=== 2023: Ranking drop, back injuries, retirement ===
Kontaveit started her 2023 season at the Adelaide International, where she was the sixth seed. Kontaveit played Zheng Qinwen in the first round, and lost in three close sets; failing to convert match points in a final set tiebreak. In week two, Kontaveit played ninth seed Paula Badosa in the first round, losing in two sets. Seeded 16th at the Australian Open, she defeated Julia Grabher in straight sets, posting her first win of the season, and first win since the Tallinn Open in October. In the second round, she led by a set and a break against eventual semifinalist, Magda Linette, but lost in three sets. After retiring against Shelby Rogers in the Abu Dhabi Open, Kontaveit had a two-month injury break. Kontaveit announced on her Instagram page that due to lumbar disc degeneration diagnosis, she could not continue training, and would end her career as a professional tennis player after the 2023 Wimbledon Championships. In November, she played her last match in an exhibition event with Ons Jabeur in Tallinn, the capital of her home country Estonia.

== Playing style ==
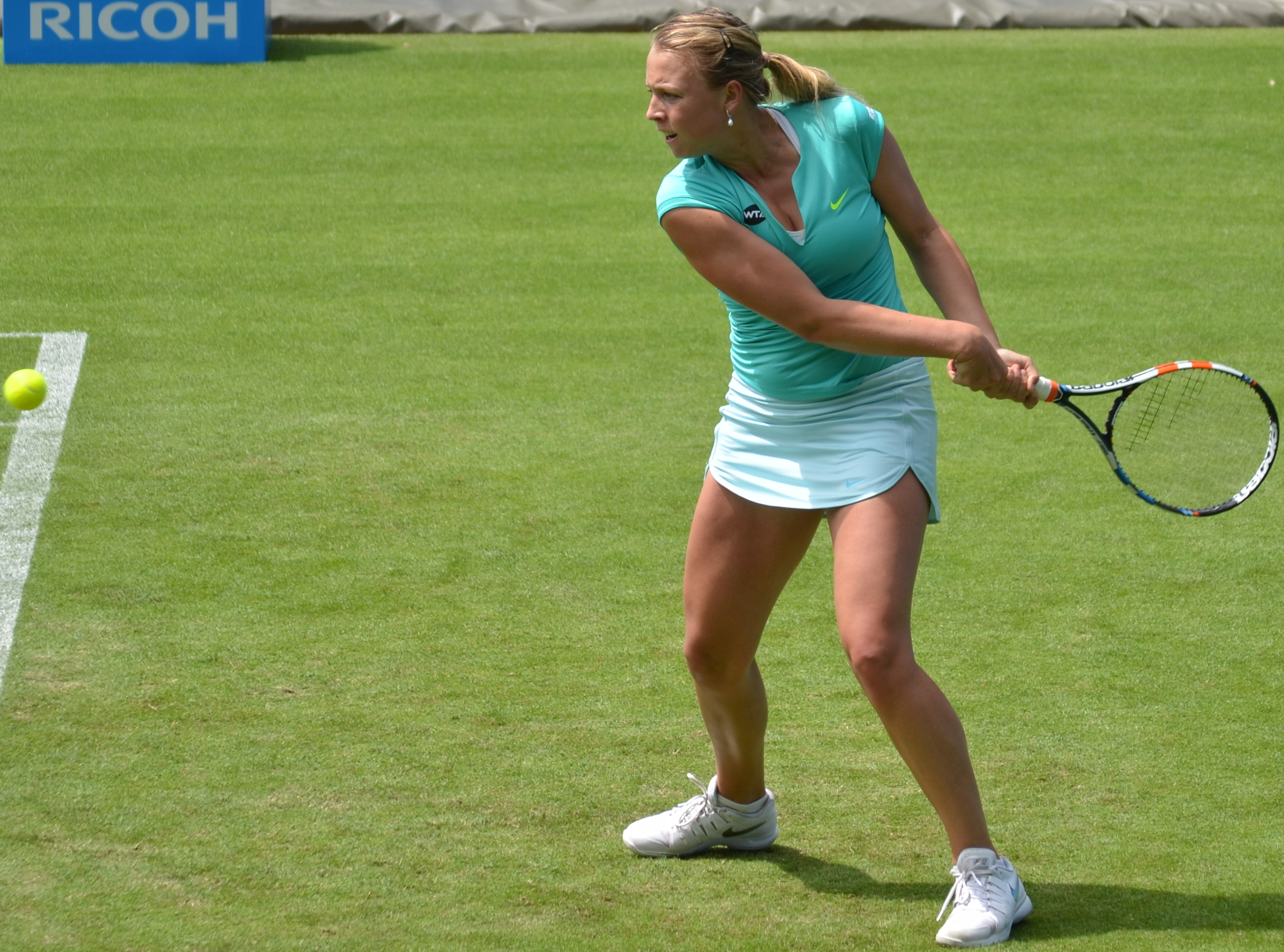
Kontaveit swinging a backhand

Kontaveit was an aggressive baseline player who uses a variety of strokes to force opponents to hit awkward shots; this enabled her to strike fast winners or draw quick errors. Due to her aggressive style, she typically hit many winners and unforced errors. Both her forehand and her two-handed backhand were hit flat, with relentless depth, power, and penetration, allowing her to dictate play from the first stroke of the rally. Kontaveit was also adept at hitting her backhand with slice, slowing the pace of rallies; she typically used this shot while playing defensively, allowing her to slow a rally's pace and reposition herself so that she can resume her aggressive style. Kontaveit had a powerful first serve, which peaked at 109 mph (175 km/h), allowing her to serve aces. She also had effective kick and slice second serves, which prevented her from double-faulting and prevented opponents from scoring free points on second-serve returns.

Although she typically played from the baseline; Kontaveit was adept at the net due to her doubles experience, and frequently attacked the net with powerful swinging volleys, which she used to finish points quickly. She typically aimed to receive short balls from her opponents, attacking with a high kick serve, altering pace with a backhand slice, and changing direction in a prolonged rally to do so. She is also noted for her speed around the baseline, which allowed her to reach most shots, counterpunch effectively, and hit running forehands; this was aided by her exceptional footwork, stamina, and court coverage.

When she hired Nigel Sears as her coach, Kontaveit had improved her serve, adding more power and variety, such as the kick serve, which helped save break points against opponents; her serve made further improvements under Dmitry Tursunov's tutelage, making her a reliable server who serves multiple aces every match. Kontaveit's movement also improved under Tursunov, allowing her to hit powerful groundstroke winners on the run and developing a more confident, positive mindset. She had also become more aggressive and learned when to pull the trigger in rallies, allowing her to develop into a proactive player who dominated her opponents through sheer power and aggression.

== Endorsements ==
Kontaveit has been endorsed by Lacoste for clothing and apparel since 2019, she was previously endorsed by Adidas; when on court, she wears Nike footwear. Kontaveit has used Babolat racquets since her junior career, specifically using the Pure Strike range of racquets. Further partners include Tallink, Porsche Estonia, and Alexela.

== Personal life ==
In 2022, Kontaveit began dating football player Brent Lepistu. She and Lepistu have one son together, born in September 2024.

== Career statistics ==
=== Grand Slam performance timelines ===
Key
W	F	SF	QF	#R	RR	Q#	DNQ	A	NH

(W) winner; (F) finalist; (SF) semifinalist; (QF) quarterfinalist; (#R) rounds 4, 3, 2, 1; (RR) round-robin stage; (Q#) qualification round; (DNQ) did not qualify; (A) absent; (NH) not held; (SR) strike rate (events won / competed); (W–L) win–loss record.
To avoid confusion and double counting, these charts are updated at the conclusion of a tournament or when the player's participation has ended.

==== Singles ====
Tournament	2013	2014	2015	2016	2017	2018	2019	2020	2021	2022	2023	SR	W–L	Win%
Australian Open	A	A	Q2	1R	1R	4R	2R	QF	3R	2R	2R	0 / 8	12–8	60%
French Open	A	Q3	Q2	1R	2R	4R	1R	1R	3R	1R	1R	0 / 8	6–8	43%
Wimbledon	A	1R	1R	1R	3R	3R	3R	NH	1R	2R	2R	0 / 9	8–9	47%
US Open	A	A	4R	1R	1R	1R	3R	4R	3R	2R	A	0 / 8	11–7	61%
Win–loss	0–0	0–1	3–2	0–4	3–4	8–4	5–3	7–3	6–4	3–4	2–3	0 / 33	37–32	54%

Note: Kontaveit withdrew from the 2019 US Open before her third-round match, which does not officially count as a loss.

==== Doubles ====
Tournament	2017	2018	2019	2020	2021	2022	SR	W–L	Win%
Australian Open	A	A	2R	2R	1R	A	0 / 3	2–3	40%
French Open	A	A	3R	A	A	A	0 / 1	2–1	67%
Wimbledon	2R	1R	1R	NH	A	2R	0 / 4	2–4	33%
US Open	A	A	2R	A	2R	A	0 / 2	2–2	50%
Win–loss	1–1	0–1	4–4	1–1	1–2	1–1	0 / 10	8–10	44%

Note: Kontaveit and Daria Kasatkina withdrew from the 2019 US Open before their second-round match, which does not officially count as a loss.

Awards
Preceded by Grit Šadeiko; Katrina Lehis	Estonian Young Athlete of the Year; 2012; 2015	Succeeded by Julia Beljajeva; Kelly Sildaru
Sporting positions
Preceded by (United States) Lauren Davis	Orange Bowl Girls' Singles Champion; Category: 18 and under 2011	Succeeded by (Croatia) Ana Konjuh
