= 2021 Porsche Tennis Grand Prix – Doubles =

Doubles
- 2021 Porsche Tennis Grand Prix

Final
- Champions: (Australia) Ashleigh Barty (United States) Jennifer Brady
- Runners-up: (United States) Desirae Krawczyk (United States) Bethanie Mattek-Sands
- Score: 6–4, 5–7, [10–5]

Details
- Draw: 16
- Seeds: 4

Events
Singles	Doubles
- Porsche Tennis Grand Prix

Ashleigh Barty and Jennifer Brady defeated Desirae Krawczyk and Bethanie Mattek-Sands in the final, 6–4, 5–7, [10–5], to win the doubles tennis title at the 2021 Stuttgart Open. By winning her 12th career WTA Tour doubles title, Barty became the first player since Lindsay Davenport in 2001 to sweep both tournaments in Stuttgart. This was also Brady's first career WTA Tour doubles title.

Mona Barthel and Anna-Lena Friedsam were the defending champions from when the tournament was last held in 2019, but lost in the quarterfinals to Nadiia Kichenok and Raluca Olaru.

== Seeds ==
1. (United States) Desirae Krawczyk / (United States) Bethanie Mattek-Sands (final)
2. (China) Xu Yifan / (China) Zhang Shuai (quarterfinals)
3. (United States) Hayley Carter / (Brazil) Luisa Stefani (first round)
4. (Ukraine) Lyudmyla Kichenok / (Latvia) Jeļena Ostapenko (first round)

== Draw ==
Key

- Q = Qualifier
- WC = Wild card
- LL = Lucky loser
- Alt = Alternate
- ITF = ITF entry
- PR = Protected ranking
- SR = Special ranking
- SE = Special exempt
- JE = Junior exempt
- JR = Junior Accelerator Programme entrant
- CO = College Accelerator Programme entrant
- NG = Next Gen Accelerator Program entrant
- w/o = Walkover
- r = Retired
- d = Defaulted

=== Draw ===
First round
1	(United States) D Krawczyk (United States) B Mattek-Sands	7^{7}	6
(Russia) V Gracheva (Romania) LI Paar	6^{1}	3
(Switzerland) B Bencic (United States) S Kenin	6	4	[4]
(Canada) S Fichman (Mexico) G Olmos	4	6	[10]
3	(United States) H Carter (Brazil) L Stefani	6^{6}	4
(Ukraine) N Kichenok (Romania) R Olaru	7^{8}	6
(Germany) M Barthel (Germany) A-L Friedsam	7	6
PR	(Georgia (country)) O Kalashnikova (Russia) A Kudryavtseva	5	0
(Germany) V Heisen (China) Y Wang	7^{7}	7^{8}
(Norway) U Eikeri (Georgia (country)) E Gorgodze	6^{5}	6^{6}
(Germany) A Kerber (Germany) A Petkovic	7^{7}	3	[10]
4	(Ukraine) L Kichenok (Latvia) J Ostapenko	6^{5}	6	[5]
(Australia) A Barty (United States) J Brady	6	6
(United States) K Christian (United States) S Santamaria	3	1
WC	(Germany) J Middendorf (Germany) N Noha Akugue	6^{5}	4
2	(China) Y Xu (China) S Zhang	7^{7}	6

Quarterfinals
1	(United States) D Krawczyk (United States) B Mattek-Sands	6	6
(Canada) S Fichman (Mexico) G Olmos	2	2
(Ukraine) N Kichenok (Romania) R Olaru	6	6
(Germany) M Barthel (Germany) A-L Friedsam	3	3
(Germany) V Heisen (China) Y Wang	6	6
(Germany) A Kerber (Germany) A Petkovic	2	4
(Australia) A Barty (United States) J Brady	6	6
2	(China) Y Xu (China) S Zhang	4	3

Semifinals
1	(United States) D Krawczyk (United States) B Mattek-Sands	7	4	[10]
(Ukraine) N Kichenok (Romania) R Olaru	5	6	[6]
(Germany) V Heisen (China) Y Wang	1	5
(Australia) A Barty (United States) J Brady	6	7

Final
1	(United States) D Krawczyk (United States) B Mattek-Sands	4	7	[5]
(Australia) A Barty (United States) J Brady	6	5	[10]
