= 2021 Porsche Tennis Grand Prix – Singles =

Singles
- 2021 Porsche Tennis Grand Prix

Final
- Champion: (Australia) Ashleigh Barty
- Runner-up: (Belarus) Aryna Sabalenka
- Score: 3–6, 6–0, 6–3

Details
- Draw: 28 (6 Q / 3 WC )
- Seeds: 8

Events
Singles	Doubles
← 2019 ·	Porsche Tennis Grand Prix	· 2022 →

Ashleigh Barty defeated Aryna Sabalenka in the final, 3–6, 6–0, 6–3 to win the women's singles tennis title at the 2021 Stuttgart Open. It marked her 11th career Women's Tennis Association (WTA) singles title and her second on clay. She became the first reigning world No. 1 to win the title since Justine Henin in 2007.

Petra Kvitová was the defending champion from when the tournament was last held in 2019, but lost in the quarterfinals to Elina Svitolina.

== Seeds ==
The top four seeds received a bye into the second round.

1. (Australia) Ashleigh Barty (champion)
2. (Romania) Simona Halep (semifinals)
3. (United States) Sofia Kenin (second round)
4. (Ukraine) Elina Svitolina (semifinals)
5. (Belarus) Aryna Sabalenka (final)
6. (Czech Republic) Karolína Plíšková (quarterfinals)
7. (Czech Republic) Petra Kvitová (quarterfinals)
8. (Switzerland) Belinda Bencic (second round)

== Draw ==
=== Key ===
- Q = Qualifier
- WC = Wild card
- LL = Lucky loser
- Alt = Alternate
- SE = Special exempt
- PR = Protected ranking
- ITF = ITF entry
- JE = Junior exempt
- w/o = Walkover
- r = Retired
- d = Defaulted
- SR = Special ranking

=== Finals ===
Semifinals
1	(Australia) Ashleigh Barty	4	7^{7}	6
4	(Ukraine) Elina Svitolina	6	6^{5}	2
5	(Belarus) Aryna Sabalenka	6	6
2	(Romania) Simona Halep	3	2

Final
1	(Australia) Ashleigh Barty	3	6	6
5	(Belarus) Aryna Sabalenka	6	0	3

=== Top half ===
First round
(Germany) L Siegemund	6	3	6
Q	(Germany) M Barthel	4	6	1
(Latvia) J Ostapenko	6	7
Q	(Switzerland) S Vögele	4	5
LL	(Germany) T Korpatsch	5	6	3
6	(Czech Republic) Ka Plíšková	7	3	6
(Germany) A Kerber	6	6
LL	(Georgia (country)) E Gorgodze	2	2
(Greece) M Sakkari	6	6
WC	(Germany) A Petkovic	2	2
(United States) J Brady	4	3
7	(Czech Republic) P Kvitová	6	6

Second round
1	(Australia) A Barty	6	7
(Germany) L Siegemund	0	5
(Latvia) J Ostapenko	7^{9}	4	3
6	(Czech Republic) Ka Plíšková	6^{7}	6	6
4	(Ukraine) E Svitolina	7^{7}	6
(Germany) A Kerber	6^{4}	3
(Greece) M Sakkari	3	6	3
7	(Czech Republic) P Kvitová	6	3	6

Quarterfinals
1	(Australia) A Barty	2	6	7
6	(Czech Republic) Ka Plíšková	6	1	5
4	(Ukraine) E Svitolina	6^{4}	7	6
7	(Czech Republic) P Kvitová	7^{7}	5	2

Semifinals
1	(Australia) A Barty	4	7^{7}	6
4	(Ukraine) E Svitolina	6	6^{5}	2

=== Bottom half ===
First round
5	(Belarus) A Sabalenka	6	6
(China) S Zhang	2	2
Q	(Norway) U Eikeri	2	0
Q	(Germany) A-L Friedsam	6	6
Q	(Germany) J Middendorf	2	3
(Estonia) A Kontaveit	6	6
8	(Switzerland) B Bencic	6	6
Q	(Germany) N Schunk	4	2
(Russia) E Alexandrova	4	6	6
(Czech Republic) K Muchová	6	2	3
(Czech Republic) M Bouzková	1	6^{6}
(Czech Republic) M Vondroušová	6	7^{8}

Second round
5	(Belarus) A Sabalenka	6	6
Q	(Germany) A-L Friedsam	4	2
(Estonia) A Kontaveit	7	6
3	(United States) S Kenin	5	4
8	(Switzerland) B Bencic	1	5
(Russia) E Alexandrova	6	7
(Czech Republic) M Vondroušová	1	3
2	(Romania) S Halep	6	6

Quarterfinals
5	(Belarus) A Sabalenka	7	4	6
(Estonia) A Kontaveit	5	6	1
(Russia) E Alexandrova	1	4
2	(Romania) S Halep	6	6

Semifinals
5	(Belarus) A Sabalenka	6	6
2	(Romania) S Halep	3	2

== Qualifying ==
=== Seeds ===
1. (Russia) Margarita Gasparyan (first round)
2. (Russia) Varvara Gracheva (qualifying competition)
3. (China) Wang Yafan (withdrew)
4. (Germany) Anna-Lena Friedsam (qualified)
5. (Switzerland) Stefanie Vögele (qualified)
6. (Germany) Tamara Korpatsch (qualifying competition, lucky loser)
7. (Germany) Mona Barthel (qualified)
8. (Chile) Daniela Seguel (first round)
9. (Croatia) Jana Fett (first round)
10. (Netherlands) Indy de Vroome (first round)
11. (Germany) Antonia Lottner (first round)
12. (Romania) Laura Ioana Paar (first round)

=== Qualifiers ===
1. (Germany) Nastasja Schunk
2. (Germany) Mona Barthel
3. (Norway) Ulrikke Eikeri
4. (Germany) Anna-Lena Friedsam
5. (Switzerland) Stefanie Vögele
6. (Germany) Julia Middendorf

=== Lucky losers ===
1. (Germany) Tamara Korpatsch
2. (Georgia (country)) Ekaterine Gorgodze

=== Qualifying draw ===
==== First qualifier ====
First round
1	(Russia) Margarita Gasparyan	3	4
WC	(Germany) Noma Noha Akugue	6	6
WC	(Germany) Nastasja Schunk	6	6
8	(Chile) Daniela Seguel	4	4

Qualifying competition
WC	(Germany) Noma Noha Akugue	0	4
WC	(Germany) Nastasja Schunk	6	6

==== Second qualifier ====
First round
2	(Russia) Varvara Gracheva	6	7
(United States) Bethanie Mattek-Sands	2	5
(Italy) Martina Caregaro	1	4
7	(Germany) Mona Barthel	6	6

Qualifying competition
2	(Russia) Varvara Gracheva	2	6	3
7	(Germany) Mona Barthel	6	3	6

==== Third qualifier ====
First round
Alt	(Italy) Angelica Moratelli	6	7
(Croatia) Tena Lukas	0	5
(Norway) Ulrikke Eikeri	3	6	6
11	(Germany) Antonia Lottner	6	3	3

Qualifying competition
Alt	(Italy) Angelica Moratelli	3	4
(Norway) Ulrikke Eikeri	6	6

==== Fourth qualifier ====
First round
4	(Germany) Anna-Lena Friedsam	6	4	6
(Germany) Stephanie Wagner	4	6	3
(Georgia (country)) Ekaterine Gorgodze	6	6
10	(Netherlands) Indy de Vroome	2	2

Qualifying competition
4	(Germany) Anna-Lena Friedsam	6	6
(Georgia (country)) Ekaterine Gorgodze	3	1

==== Fifth qualifier ====
First round
5	(Switzerland) Stefanie Vögele	6	6
PR	(Germany) Anna Zaja	1	3
(Germany) Katharina Gerlach	6	7
12	(Romania) Laura Ioana Paar	3	5

Qualifying competition
5	(Switzerland) Stefanie Vögele	6	6
(Germany) Katharina Gerlach	3	1

==== Sixth qualifier ====
First round
6	(Germany) Tamara Korpatsch	2	6	6
WC	(Germany) Alexandra Vecic	6	4	2
WC	(Germany) Julia Middendorf	4	6	6
9	(Croatia) Jana Fett	6	1	3

Qualifying competition
6	(Germany) Tamara Korpatsch	6	3	0
WC	(Germany) Julia Middendorf	2	6	6

== Sources ==
- Main draw
- Qualifying draw
