= 2021 Porsche Tennis Grand Prix =

Women's tennis tournament

- Date: 19–25 April
- Edition: 43rd
- Category: WTA 500
- Draw: 28S / 16D
- Prize money: $565,530
- Surface: Clay (indoor)
- Location: Stuttgart, Germany
- Venue: Porsche-Arena

Champions

Singles
- (Australia) Ashleigh Barty

Doubles
- (Australia) Ashleigh Barty / (United States) Jennifer Brady
← 2019 ·	Porsche Tennis Grand Prix	· 2022 →

The 2021 Porsche Tennis Grand Prix was a women's tennis tournament played on indoor clay courts. It was the 43rd edition of the Porsche Tennis Grand Prix and was classified as a WTA 500 tournament on the 2021 WTA Tour. It was held at the Porsche Arena in Stuttgart, Germany from 19 to 25 April 2021.

Ashleigh Barty won both the singles title and doubles title (alongside partner Jennifer Brady). The feat earned Barty her 11th career WTA Tour singles title and made her the first reigning world No. 1 to win the singles tournament since Justine Henin in 2007. By winning her 12th career WTA Tour doubles title, she also became the first player to sweep both tournaments since Lindsay Davenport in 2001. It was Brady's maiden career WTA Tour doubles title.

== Finals ==
=== Singles ===
- (Australia) Ashleigh Barty defeated (Belarus) Aryna Sabalenka, 3–6, 6–0, 6–3.

=== Doubles ===
- (Australia) Ashleigh Barty / (United States) Jennifer Brady defeated (United States) Desirae Krawczyk / (United States) Bethanie Mattek-Sands, 6–4, 5–7, [10–5].

== Points and prize money ==
=== Point distribution ===
Event	W	F	SF	QF	Round of 16	Round of 32	Q	Q2	Q1
Singles	470	305	185	100	55	1	25	13	1
Doubles	470	305	185	100	1	—	—	—	—

=== Prize money ===
Event	W	F	SF	QF	Round of 16	Round of 32	Q2	Q1
Singles	$55,300	$41,141	$26,130	$12,500	$6,612	$5,362	$4,032	$2,068
Doubles	$20,346	$14,314	$8,064	$4,436	$2,824	—	—	—

== Singles main draw entrants ==
=== Seeds ===
Country	Player	Rank^{1}	Seed
AUS	Ashleigh Barty	1	1
ROU	Simona Halep	3	2
USA	Sofia Kenin	4	3
UKR	Elina Svitolina	5	4
BLR	Aryna Sabalenka	7	5
CZE	Karolína Plíšková	9	6
CZE	Petra Kvitová	10	7
SUI	Belinda Bencic	12	8

- ^{1} Rankings are as of 12 April 2021.

=== Other entrants ===
The following player received a wildcard into the main draw:

- (Germany) Andrea Petkovic

The following players received entry from the qualifying draw:

- (Germany) Mona Barthel
- (Norway) Ulrikke Eikeri
- (Germany) Anna-Lena Friedsam
- (Germany) Julia Middendorf
- (Germany) Nastasja Schunk
- (Switzerland) Stefanie Vögele

The following players received entry as lucky losers:

- (Georgia (country)) Ekaterine Gorgodze
- (Germany) Tamara Korpatsch

=== Withdrawals ===
Before the tournament

- (Belarus) Victoria Azarenka → replaced by (China) Zhang Shuai
- (Netherlands) Kiki Bertens → replaced by (Georgia (country)) Ekaterine Gorgodze
- (United Kingdom) Johanna Konta → replaced by (Russia) Ekaterina Alexandrova
- (Kazakhstan) Elena Rybakina → replaced by (Germany) Tamara Korpatsch
- (Poland) Iga Świątek → replaced by (Germany) Angelique Kerber

== Doubles main draw entrants ==
=== Seeds ===
Country	Player	Country	Player	Rank^{1}	Seed
USA	Desirae Krawczyk	USA	Bethanie Mattek-Sands	40	1
CHN	Xu Yifan	CHN	Zhang Shuai	47	2
USA	Hayley Carter	BRA	Luisa Stefani	52	3
UKR	Lyudmyla Kichenok	LAT	Jeļena Ostapenko	65	4

- ^{1} Rankings as of 12 April 2021.

=== Other entrants ===
The following pair received a wildcard into the main draw:

- (Germany) Julia Middendorf / (Germany) Noma Noha Akugue

The following pair received entry using a protected ranking:

- (Georgia (country)) Oksana Kalashnikova / (Russia) Alla Kudryavtseva

=== Withdrawals ===
Before the tournament

- (Chinese Taipei) Chan Hao-ching / (Chinese Taipei) Latisha Chan → replaced by (Germany) Mona Barthel / (Germany) Anna-Lena Friedsam
- (Australia) Ellen Perez / (Australia) Storm Sanders → replaced by (Norway) Ulrikke Eikeri / (Georgia (country)) Ekaterine Gorgodze
