= Julia Middendorf =

German tennis player (born 2003)

- Country (sports): Germany
- Born: 31 January 2003 (age 22); Vechta, Germany
- Height: 1.70 m (5 ft 7 in)
- Plays: Right-handed (two-handed backhand)
- Prize money: $66,347

Singles
- Career record: 110–78
- Career titles: 3 ITF
- Highest ranking: No. 347 (7 August 2023)
- Current ranking: No. 446 (15 July 2024)

Doubles
- Career record: 11–26
- Highest ranking: No. 610 (7 November 2022)
- Current ranking: No. 1001 (15 July 2024)
- Last updated on: 21 July 2024.

Julia Middendorf (born 31 January 2003) is a German tennis player.

Middendorf has a career-high WTA singles ranking of 347, achieved in August 2023, and a best doubles ranking of No. 610, reached in November 2022.

She made her WTA Tour main-draw debut at the 2021 Stuttgart Open, after defeating Jana Fett and Tamara Korpatsch in the qualifying, but losing to Anett Kontaveit in the first round.

== ITF Circuit finals ==
=== Singles: 6 (3 titles, 3 runner–ups) ===
Legend
W25 tournaments (0–2)
W15 tournaments (3–1)

Result	W–L	Date	Tournament	Tier	Surface	Opponent	Score
Win	1–0	Aug 2021	ITF Erwitte, Germany	W15	Clay	(Denmark) Sofia Samavati	3–6, 7–5, 6–2
Loss	1–1	Nov 2021	ITF Monastir, Tunisia	W15	Hard	(China) Ma Yexin	4–6, 2–6
Win	2–1	Apr 2022	ITF Antalya, Turkey	W15	Clay	Victoria Kan	6–1, 4–1 ret.
Win	3–1	Aug 2022	ITF Erwitte, Germany	W15	Clay	(Greece) Martha Matoula	3–6, 6–3, 6–4
Loss	3–2	Jul 2023	ITF Stuttgart, Germany	W25	Clay	(Germany) Ella Seidel	3–6, 1–6
Loss	3–3	Aug 2023	ITF Braunschweig, Germany	W25	Clay	(Germany) Ella Seidel	6–7^{(4)}, 3–6

=== Doubles: 2 (runner–ups) ===
Legend
W15 tournaments (0–2)

Result	W–L	Date	Tournament	Tier	Surface	Partner	Opponents	Score
Loss	0–1	Nov 2021	ITF Monastir, Tunisia	W15	Hard	(Croatia) Mariana Dražić	(France) Yasmine Mansouri (Serbia) Elena Milovanović	6–7^{(4)}, 0–6
Loss	0–2	Mar 2022	ITF Gonesse, France	W15	Clay (i)	(Germany) Nicole Rivkin	(France) Flavie Brugnone (Serbia) Tamara Čurović	2–6, 3–6
