= 2015 BGL Luxembourg Open – Doubles =

Doubles
- 2015 BGL Luxembourg Open

Final
- Champions: (Germany) Mona Barthel (Germany) Laura Siegemund
- Runners-up: (Spain) Anabel Medina Garrigues (Spain) Arantxa Parra Santonja
- Score: 6–2, 7–6^{(7–2)}

Events
Singles	Doubles
← 2014 ·	BGL Luxembourg Open	· 2016 →

Timea Bacsinszky and Kristina Barrois were the defeating champions, but chose not to participate this year.

Mona Barthel and Laura Siegemund won the title, defeating Anabel Medina Garrigues and Arantxa Parra Santonja in the final, 6–2, 7–6^{(7–2)}.

== Seeds ==
1. (Spain) Anabel Medina Garrigues / (Spain) Arantxa Parra Santonja (final)
2. (Netherlands) Kiki Bertens / (Sweden) Johanna Larsson (semifinals)
3. (Germany) Mona Barthel / (Germany) Laura Siegemund (champions)
4. (Belgium) Ysaline Bonaventure / (Liechtenstein) Stephanie Vogt (semifinals)

== Draw ==
=== Key ===
- Q = Qualifier
- WC = Wild card
- LL = Lucky loser
- Alt = Alternate
- SE = Special exempt
- PR = Protected ranking
- ITF = ITF entry
- JE = Junior exempt
- w/o = Walkover
- r = Retired
- d = Defaulted
- SR = Special ranking

First round
1	(Spain) A Medina Garrigues (Spain) A Parra Santonja	6	6
(Slovakia) J Čepelová (Switzerland) S Vögele	0	2
(Japan) M Doi (Georgia (country)) O Kalashnikova	6	7
(Switzerland) X Knoll (Belgium) E Mertens	3	5
4	(Belgium) Y Bonaventure (Liechtenstein) S Vogt	3	6	[10]
WC	(Italy) C Coppola (Spain) S Soler Espinosa	6	3	[6]
(Czech Republic) L Kunčíková (Czech Republic) K Stuchlá	6	3	[5]
(Belgium) A-S Mestach (Belgium) A Van Uytvanck	3	6	[10]
(Germany) T Maria (United Kingdom) H Watson	6	6
(Austria) S Klemenschits (Germany) C Witthöft	2	1
(Romania) E Bogdan (Romania) A Mitu	0	4
3	(Germany) M Barthel (Germany) L Siegemund	6	6
(United States) M Brengle (United Kingdom) J Rae	5	4
(France) J Coin (Luxembourg) M Minella	7	6
(Germany) A Beck (United States) A Tatishvili	6	3	[6]
2	(Netherlands) K Bertens (Sweden) J Larsson	3	6	[10]

Quarterfinals
1	(Spain) A Medina Garrigues (Spain) A Parra Santonja	7^{7}	6^{4}	[10]
(Japan) M Doi (Georgia (country)) O Kalashnikova	6^{5}	7^{7}	[6]
4	(Belgium) Y Bonaventure (Liechtenstein) S Vogt	7	6
(Belgium) A-S Mestach (Belgium) A Van Uytvanck	5	2
(Germany) T Maria (United Kingdom) H Watson	6	4	[8]
3	(Germany) M Barthel (Germany) L Siegemund	4	6	[10]
(France) J Coin (Luxembourg) M Minella	6	4	[13]
2	(Netherlands) K Bertens (Sweden) J Larsson	4	6	[15]

Semifinals
1	(Spain) A Medina Garrigues (Spain) A Parra Santonja	6	6
4	(Belgium) Y Bonaventure (Liechtenstein) S Vogt	3	3
3	(Germany) M Barthel (Germany) L Siegemund	4	6	[15]
2	(Netherlands) K Bertens (Sweden) J Larsson	6	1	[13]

Final
1	(Spain) A Medina Garrigues (Spain) A Parra Santonja	2	6^{2}
3	(Germany) M Barthel (Germany) L Siegemund	6	7^{7}
