= 2015 BGL Luxembourg Open – Singles =

Singles
- 2015 BGL Luxembourg Open

Final
- Champion: (Japan) Misaki Doi
- Runner-up: (Germany) Mona Barthel
- Score: 6–4, 6–7^{(7–9)}, 6–0

Details
- Draw: 32
- Seeds: 8

Events
Singles	Doubles
- BGL Luxembourg Open

Annika Beck was the defending champion, but lost in the first round to Anna-Lena Friedsam.

Misaki Doi won the title, defeating Mona Barthel in the final, 6–4, 6–7^{(7–9)}, 6–0.

== Seeds ==
1. (Switzerland) Timea Bacsinszky (first round, retired)
2. (Serbia) Ana Ivanovic (second round)
3. (Italy) Sara Errani (second round)
4. (Germany) Andrea Petkovic (first round)
5. (Serbia) Jelena Janković (quarterfinals)
6. (United States) Sloane Stephens (first round)
7. (Czech Republic) Barbora Strýcová (quarterfinals)
8. (Germany) Annika Beck (first round)

== Draw ==
Key

- Q = Qualifier
- WC = Wild card
- LL = Lucky loser
- Alt = Alternate
- ITF = ITF entry
- PR = Protected ranking
- SR = Special ranking
- SE = Special exempt
- JE = Junior exempt
- JR = Junior Accelerator Programme entrant
- CO = College Accelerator Programme entrant
- NG = Next Gen Accelerator Program entrant
- w/o = Walkover
- r = Retired
- d = Defaulted

=== Finals ===
Semifinals
WC	(Switzerland) Stefanie Vögele	2	3
(Germany) Mona Barthel	6	6
(Japan) Misaki Doi	6	0
(Belgium) Alison Van Uytvanck	4	0^{r}

Final
(Germany) Mona Barthel	4	7^{9}	0
(Japan) Misaki Doi	6	6^{7}	6

=== Top half ===
First round
1	(Switzerland) T Bacsinszky	6	4	0^{r}
LL	(Germany) L Siegemund	4	6	0
(Belgium) K Flipkens	6	6
(United States) M Brengle	4	3
WC	(Switzerland) S Vögele	6	4
(Poland) U Radwańska	3	0^{r}
(Germany) A-L Friedsam	4	6	6
8	(Germany) A Beck	6	3	4
3	(Italy) S Errani	5	6	6
Q	(France) J Coin	7	4	1
(Germany) C Witthöft	4	6^{3}
(Croatia) M Lučić-Baroni	6	7^{7}
WC	(France) T Andrianjafitrimo	5	5
(Germany) T Maria	7	7
(Germany) M Barthel	6	7
6	(United States) S Stephens	4	5

Second round
LL	(Germany) L Siegemund	7^{7}	6
(Belgium) K Flipkens	6^{2}	1
WC	(Switzerland) S Vögele	6	7^{7}
(Germany) A-L Friedsam	3	6^{4}
3	(Italy) S Errani	3	4
(Croatia) M Lučić-Baroni	6	6
(Germany) T Maria	3	6	2
(Germany) M Barthel	6	2	6

Quarterfinals
LL	(Germany) L Siegemund	4	6	1
WC	(Switzerland) S Vögele	6	2	6
(Croatia) M Lučić-Baroni	3	4
(Germany) M Barthel	6	6

Semifinals
WC	(Switzerland) S Vögele	2	3
(Germany) M Barthel	6	6

=== Bottom half ===
First round
5	(Serbia) J Janković	6	6
WC	(Luxembourg) M Minella	1	4
LL	(France) O Dodin	6^{5}	3
Q	(United States) A Tatishvili	7^{7}	6
Q	(Slovakia) J Čepelová	3	6	1
(Czech Republic) D Allertová	6	4	6
(Japan) M Doi	7	2	7
4	(Germany) A Petkovic	5	6	5
7	(Czech Republic) B Strýcová	6	6
(Belgium) Y Wickmayer	4	2
(Sweden) J Larsson	7^{7}	6^{3}	6
(Romania) A Mitu	6^{5}	7^{7}	3
(Belgium) A Van Uytvanck	6	7^{7}
Q	(Netherlands) R Hogenkamp	2	6^{4}
(United Kingdom) H Watson	4	3
2	(Serbia) A Ivanovic	6	6

Second round
5	(Serbia) J Janković	6	6
Q	(United States) A Tatishvili	4	2
(Czech Republic) D Allertová	5	2
(Japan) M Doi	7	6
7	(Czech Republic) B Strýcová	6	7
(Sweden) J Larsson	2	5
(Belgium) A Van Uytvanck	6	6^{5}	7
2	(Serbia) A Ivanovic	4	7^{7}	5

Quarterfinals
5	(Serbia) J Janković	6^{4}	5
(Japan) M Doi	7^{7}	7
7	(Czech Republic) B Strýcová	4	4
(Belgium) A Van Uytvanck	6	6

Semifinals
(Japan) M Doi	6	0
(Belgium) A Van Uytvanck	4	0^{r}

== Qualifying ==
=== Seeds ===
1. (Estonia) Anett Kontaveit (first round, retired)
2. (Czech Republic) Tereza Smitková (second round)
3. (Netherlands) Kiki Bertens (second round)
4. (Germany) Laura Siegemund (qualifying competition, lucky loser)
5. (United States) Anna Tatishvili (qualified)
6. (United Kingdom) Naomi Broady (first round)
7. (United States) Louisa Chirico (second round)
8. (France) Océane Dodin (qualifying competition, lucky loser)

=== Qualifiers ===
1. (France) Julie Coin
2. (United States) Anna Tatishvili
3. (Slovakia) Jana Čepelová
4. (Netherlands) Richèl Hogenkamp

=== Lucky losers ===
1. (Germany) Laura Siegemund
2. (France) Océane Dodin

=== Draw ===
==== First qualifier ====
First round
1	(Estonia) Anett Kontaveit	5	1^{r}
(France) Julie Coin	7	4
(France) Mathilde Johansson	6	7^{7}
WC	(Luxembourg) Eléonora Molinaro	1	6^{4}
(Czech Republic) Tereza Martincová	6	7^{7}
(Belgium) Ysaline Bonaventure	4	6^{1}
(France) Alizé Lim	4	2
7/WC	(United States) Louisa Chirico	6	6

Second round
(France) Julie Coin	3	7	6
(France) Mathilde Johansson	6	5	1
(Czech Republic) Tereza Martincová	3	6	7^{7}
7/WC	(United States) Louisa Chirico	6	2	6^{5}

Qualifying competition
(France) Julie Coin	6	6
(Czech Republic) Tereza Martincová	1	1

==== Second qualifier ====
First round
2	(Czech Republic) Tereza Smitková	6	6
WC	(Italy) Claudia Coppola	4	2
(Liechtenstein) Stephanie Vogt	6	6
(Czech Republic) Barbora Štefková	4	2
(Germany) Anne Schäfer	2	1
(Belgium) Elise Mertens	6	6
(Romania) Elena Bogdan	2	3
5	(United States) Anna Tatishvili	6	6

Second round
2	(Czech Republic) Tereza Smitková	4	7	6^{3}
(Liechtenstein) Stephanie Vogt	6	5	7^{7}
(Belgium) Elise Mertens	1	1
5	(United States) Anna Tatishvili	6	6

Qualifying competition
(Liechtenstein) Stephanie Vogt	3	4
5	(United States) Anna Tatishvili	6	6

==== Third qualifier ====
First round
3	(Netherlands) Kiki Bertens	7^{7}	6
(Switzerland) Jil Teichmann	6^{3}	2
(Slovakia) Jana Čepelová	6	6
(Germany) Anna Zaja	4	1
(Spain) Sílvia Soler Espinosa	7^{7}	5	7
(Austria) Tamira Paszek	6^{5}	7	5
(Serbia) Ivana Jorović	1	6^{3}
8	(France) Océane Dodin	6	7^{7}

Second round
3	(Netherlands) Kiki Bertens	6	3	1
(Slovakia) Jana Čepelová	4	6	6
(Spain) Sílvia Soler Espinosa	1	0
8	(France) Océane Dodin	6	6

Qualifying competition
(Slovakia) Jana Čepelová	2	6	6
8	(France) Océane Dodin	6	3	4

==== Fourth qualifier ====
First round
4	(Germany) Laura Siegemund	6	6
WC	(Germany) Katharina Hobgarski	4	0
(Czech Republic) Jesika Malečková	6	2	7^{7}
(Croatia) Jana Fett	4	6	6^{4}
(United States) Shelby Rogers	6^{3}	0^{r}
(Croatia) Tena Lukas	7^{7}	0
(Netherlands) Richèl Hogenkamp	6	3	6
6	(United Kingdom) Naomi Broady	4	6	3

Second round
4	(Germany) Laura Siegemund	6	6
(Czech Republic) Jesika Malečková	0	4
(Croatia) Tena Lukas	0	6	3
(Netherlands) Richèl Hogenkamp	6	4	6

Qualifying competition
4	(Germany) Laura Siegemund	6^{8}	5
(Netherlands) Richèl Hogenkamp	7^{10}	7
