= 2014 BGL Luxembourg Open – Singles =

Singles
- 2014 BGL Luxembourg Open

Final
- Champion: (Germany) Annika Beck
- Runner-up: (Czech Republic) Barbora Záhlavová-Strýcová
- Score: 6–2, 6–1

Details
- Draw: 32
- Seeds: 8

Events
Singles	Doubles
- BGL Luxembourg Open

Caroline Wozniacki was the defending champion, but chose not to participate this year.

Annika Beck won the tournament, defeating Barbora Záhlavová-Strýcová in the final, 6–2, 6–1. It was her first WTA Tour title.

== Seeds ==
1. (Germany) Andrea Petkovic (first round)
2. (France) Alizé Cornet (second round)
3. (Germany) Sabine Lisicki (second round)
4. (Czech Republic) Barbora Záhlavová-Strýcová (final)
5. (United States) Varvara Lepchenko (quarterfinals)
6. (Italy) Roberta Vinci (second round)
7. (Belgium) Kirsten Flipkens (first round)
8. (Romania) Monica Niculescu (second round)

== Draw ==
Key

- Q = Qualifier
- WC = Wild card
- LL = Lucky loser
- Alt = Alternate
- ITF = ITF entry
- PR = Protected ranking
- SR = Special ranking
- SE = Special exempt
- JE = Junior exempt
- JR = Junior Accelerator Programme entrant
- CO = College Accelerator Programme entrant
- NG = Next Gen Accelerator Program entrant
- w/o = Walkover
- r = Retired
- d = Defaulted

=== Finals ===
Semifinals
(Germany) Annika Beck	6	6
Q	(Czech Republic) Denisa Allertová	0	1
4	(Czech Republic) Barbora Záhlavová-Strýcová	6	6
(Germany) Mona Barthel	3	2

Final
(Germany) Annika Beck	6	6
4	(Czech Republic) Barbora Záhlavová-Strýcová	2	1

=== Top half ===
First round
1	(Germany) A Petkovic	4	2
(France) P Parmentier	6	6
(Austria) P Mayr-Achleitner	2
(Italy) K Knapp	3^{r}
(Germany) A Beck	7^{8}	6
(Switzerland) T Bacsinszky	6^{6}	3
(Czech Republic) T Smitková	1	3
6	(Italy) R Vinci	6	6
3	(Germany) S Lisicki	7	6
(Slovakia) D Hantuchová	5	0
Q	(Tunisia) O Jabeur	1	6	2
Q	(Czech Republic) D Allertová	6	3	6
(Spain) MT Torró Flor	3	0
(Slovakia) J Čepelová	6	6
WC	(Germany) J Görges	3	7	2
5	(United States) V Lepchenko	6	5	6

Second round
(France) P Parmentier	1	5
(Austria) P Mayr-Achleitner	6	7
(Germany) A Beck	7	6
6	(Italy) R Vinci	5	0
3	(Germany) S Lisicki	5	2
Q	(Czech Republic) D Allertová	7	6
(Slovakia) J Čepelová	2	2
5	(United States) V Lepchenko	6	6

Quarterfinals
(Austria) P Mayr-Achleitner	2	2
(Germany) A Beck	6	6
Q	(Czech Republic) D Allertová	4	6	7
5	(United States) V Lepchenko	6	3	5

Semifinals
(Germany) A Beck	6	6
Q	(Czech Republic) D Allertová	0	1

=== Bottom half ===
First round
7	(Belgium) K Flipkens	6^{5}	1
Q	(Sweden) J Larsson	7^{7}	6
(New Zealand) M Erakovic	3	4
(Slovenia) P Hercog	6	6
(Switzerland) S Vögele	7	2	2
(Belgium) A Van Uytvanck	5	6	6
(Spain) S Soler Espinosa	4	3
4	(Czech Republic) B Záhlavová-Strýcová	6	6
8	(Romania) M Niculescu	6	6
WC	(Germany) A Lottner	2	2
(Germany) M Barthel	6	6
WC	(Luxembourg) M Minella	3	4
(Netherlands) K Bertens	2	6	6
SE	(Germany) A-L Friedsam	6	2	4
Q	(Czech Republic) L Hradecká	2	6^{6}
2	(France) A Cornet	6	7^{8}

Second round
Q	(Sweden) J Larsson	6^{8}	7	6
(Slovenia) P Hercog	7^{10}	5	1
(Belgium) A Van Uytvanck	4	6^{1}
4	(Czech Republic) B Záhlavová-Strýcová	6	7^{7}
8	(Romania) M Niculescu	6	5	3
(Germany) M Barthel	0	7	6
(Netherlands) K Bertens	6	6
2	(France) A Cornet	2	3

Quarterfinals
Q	(Sweden) J Larsson	0	2
4	(Czech Republic) B Záhlavová-Strýcová	6	6
(Germany) M Barthel	6	6
(Netherlands) K Bertens	3	0

Semifinals
4	(Czech Republic) B Záhlavová-Strýcová	6	6
(Germany) M Barthel	3	2

== Qualifying ==
=== Seeds ===
1. ' (Sweden) Johanna Larsson (qualified)
2. (Romania) Alexandra Dulgheru (first round)
3. (Ukraine) Maryna Zanevska (second round)
4. (Poland) Katarzyna Piter (second round)
5. (United Kingdom) Johanna Konta (first round; retired)
6. (United Kingdom) Naomi Broady (second round)
7. ' (Czech Republic) Denisa Allertová (qualified)
8. (Netherlands) Richèl Hogenkamp (second round)

=== Qualifiers ===
1. (Sweden) Johanna Larsson
2. (Czech Republic) Lucie Hradecká
3. (Tunisia) Ons Jabeur
4. (Czech Republic) Denisa Allertová

=== Qualifying draw ===
==== First qualifier ====
First round
1	(Sweden) Johanna Larsson	6	6
(Ukraine) Sofiya Kovalets	1	2
WC	(France) Océane Dodin	6	1	5
WC	(Serbia) Ivana Jorović	4	6	7
(Germany) Laura Siegemund	7	4	6
(Liechtenstein) Stephanie Vogt	5	6	4
(France) Victoria Muntean	3	3
6	(United Kingdom) Naomi Broady	6	6

Second round
1	(Sweden) Johanna Larsson	6	6
WC	(Serbia) Ivana Jorović	3	2
(Germany) Laura Siegemund	7^{11}	6
6	(United Kingdom) Naomi Broady	6^{9}	4

Qualifying competition
1	(Sweden) Johanna Larsson	3	7^{7}	6
(Germany) Laura Siegemund	6	6^{5}	4

==== Second qualifier ====
First round
2	(Romania) Alexandra Dulgheru	6	6^{3}	3
(Czech Republic) Lucie Hradecká	3	7^{7}	6
(Germany) Kristina Barrois	2	6	6
(France) Mathilde Johansson	6	3	0
WC	(Luxembourg) Sharon Pesch	0	2
WC	(Germany) Katharina Hobgarski	6	6
(Switzerland) Viktorija Golubic	6	2	3
8	(Netherlands) Richèl Hogenkamp	4	6	6

Second round
(Czech Republic) Lucie Hradecká	6	6
(Germany) Kristina Barrois	4	4
WC	(Germany) Katharina Hobgarski	3	6	6
8	(Netherlands) Richèl Hogenkamp	6	3	4

Qualifying competition
(Czech Republic) Lucie Hradecká	6	7^{7}
WC	(Germany) Katharina Hobgarski	4	6^{2}

==== Third qualifier ====
First round
3	(Ukraine) Maryna Zanevska	6	6
(Bulgaria) Elitsa Kostova	2	3
WC	(Italy) Claudia Coppola	2	1
(Tunisia) Ons Jabeur	6	6
(Czech Republic) Barbora Krejčíková	6	6
(Spain) Sara Sorribes Tormo	0	3
(Italy) Gioia Barbieri	6	6
5	(United Kingdom) Johanna Konta	3	5^{r}

Second round
3	(Ukraine) Maryna Zanevska	4	6	6^{5}
(Tunisia) Ons Jabeur	6	3	7^{7}
(Czech Republic) Barbora Krejčíková	4	4
(Italy) Gioia Barbieri	6	6

Qualifying competition
(Tunisia) Ons Jabeur	7	6
(Italy) Gioia Barbieri	5	1

==== Fourth qualifier ====
First round
4	(Poland) Katarzyna Piter	6	6
(United States) Nicole Melichar	0	2
(France) Irena Pavlovic	1	3
(Kazakhstan) Sesil Karatantcheva	6	6
(France) Laura Thorpe	6	1	2
(Czech Republic) Kateřina Vaňková	4	6	6
(Spain) Estrella Cabeza Candela	6	2	5
7	(Czech Republic) Denisa Allertová	4	6	7

Second round
4	(Poland) Katarzyna Piter	2	2
(Kazakhstan) Sesil Karatantcheva	6	6
(Czech Republic) Kateřina Vaňková	6	4
7	(Czech Republic) Denisa Allertová	7	6

Qualifying competition
(Kazakhstan) Sesil Karatantcheva	5	6	4
7	(Czech Republic) Denisa Allertová	7	1	6
