= 2014 BGL Luxembourg Open – Doubles =

Doubles
- 2014 BGL Luxembourg Open

Final
- Champions: (Switzerland) Timea Bacsinszky (Germany) Kristina Barrois
- Runners-up: (Czech Republic) Lucie Hradecká (Czech Republic) Barbora Krejčíková
- Score: 3–6, 6–4, [10–4]

Events
Singles	Doubles
← 2013 ·	BGL Luxembourg Open	· 2015 →

Stephanie Vogt and Yanina Wickmayer were the defending champions, but chose not to participate this year.

Timea Bacsinszky and Kristina Barrois won the tournament, defeating Lucie Hradecká and Barbora Krejčíková in the final, 3–6, 6–4, [10–4].

== Seeds ==
1. (Spain) Anabel Medina Garrigues / (Spain) Sílvia Soler Espinosa (semifinals)
2. (Germany) Julia Görges / (Germany) Anna-Lena Grönefeld (first round)
3. (Czech Republic) Lucie Hradecká / (Czech Republic) Barbora Krejčíková (final)
4. (Germany) Mona Barthel / (Luxembourg) Mandy Minella (first round)

== Draw ==
=== Key ===
- Q = Qualifier
- WC = Wild card
- LL = Lucky loser
- Alt = Alternate
- SE = Special exempt
- PR = Protected ranking
- ITF = ITF entry
- JE = Junior exempt
- w/o = Walkover
- r = Retired
- d = Defaulted
- SR = Special ranking

First round
1	(Spain) A Medina Garrigues (Spain) S Soler Espinosa	6	6
(United Kingdom) N Broady (Czech Republic) E Hrdinová	1	4
(Romania) E Bogdan (United States) N Melichar	7^{7}	7
(France) A Cornet (France) P Parmentier	6^{3}	5
3	(Czech Republic) L Hradecká (Czech Republic) B Krejčíková	5	6	[10]
(Poland) K Piter (Ukraine) M Zanevska	7	3	[7]
(United Kingdom) J Rae (United Kingdom) A Smith	6	7
(Germany) A Beck (Austria) S Klemenschits	2	5
(Switzerland) T Bacsinszky (Germany) K Barrois	2	6	[10]
(Austria) P Mayr-Achleitner (France) L Thorpe	6	1	[7]
(Sweden) J Larsson (Spain) MT Torró Flor	7	7
4	(Germany) M Barthel (Luxembourg) M Minella	5	5
(Germany) A Lottner (Germany) L Siegemund	6	6
(Argentina) T Búa (Switzerland) V Golubic	2	0
(United States) V Lepchenko (Romania) M Niculescu	4	6	[10]
2	(Germany) J Görges (Germany) A-L Grönefeld	6	4	[4]

Quarterfinals
1	(Spain) A Medina Garrigues (Spain) S Soler Espinosa	6	6
(Romania) E Bogdan (United States) N Melichar	0	2
3	(Czech Republic) L Hradecká (Czech Republic) B Krejčíková	6	6
(United Kingdom) J Rae (United Kingdom) A Smith	1	3
(Switzerland) T Bacsinszky (Germany) K Barrois	6	6
(Sweden) J Larsson (Spain) MT Torró Flor	0	4
(Germany) A Lottner (Germany) L Siegemund	6	6
(United States) V Lepchenko (Romania) M Niculescu	2	1

Semifinals
1	(Spain) A Medina Garrigues (Spain) S Soler Espinosa	3	4
3	(Czech Republic) L Hradecká (Czech Republic) B Krejčíková	6	6
(Switzerland) T Bacsinszky (Germany) K Barrois	6	6
(Germany) A Lottner (Germany) L Siegemund	3	4

Final
3	(Czech Republic) L Hradecká (Czech Republic) B Krejčíková	6	4	[4]
(Switzerland) T Bacsinszky (Germany) K Barrois	3	6	[10]
