= 2015 BGL Luxembourg Open =

Women's tennis tournament

- Date: 19–25 October
- Edition: 20th
- Category: WTA International
- Draw: 32S / 16D
- Prize money: $226,750
- Surface: Hard (indoor)
- Location: Kockelscheuer, Luxembourg

Champions

Singles
- (Japan) Misaki Doi

Doubles
- (Germany) Mona Barthel / (Germany) Laura Siegemund
← 2014 ·	Luxembourg Open	· 2016 →

The 2015 BGL Luxembourg Open was a women's tennis tournament played on indoor hard courts sponsored by BNP Paribas. It was the 20th edition of the Luxembourg Open, and part of the WTA International tournaments category of the 2015 WTA Tour. It was held in Kockelscheuer, Luxembourg, on 19 October until 25 October 2015. Unseeded Misaki Doi won the singles title.

== Finals ==
=== Singles ===
- (Japan) Misaki Doi defeated (Germany) Mona Barthel, 6–4, 6–7^{(7–9)}, 6–0

=== Doubles ===
- (Germany) Mona Barthel / (Germany) Laura Siegemund defeated (Spain) Anabel Medina Garrigues / (Spain) Arantxa Parra Santonja, 6–2, 7–6^{(7–2)}

== Points and prize money ==
=== Point distribution ===
Event	W	F	SF	QF	Round of 16	Round of 32	Q	Q3	Q2	Q1
Singles	280	180	110	60	30	1	18	14	10	1
Doubles	280	180	110	60	1	—	—	—	—	—

=== Prize money ===
Event	W	F	SF	QF	Round of 16	Round of 32^{1}	Q3	Q2	Q1
Singles	€34,677	€17,258	€9,113	€4,758	€2,669	€1,552	€810	€589	€427
Doubles *	€9,919	€5,161	€2,770	€1,468	€774	—	—	—	—

_{^{1} Qualifiers prize money is also the Round of 32 prize money}
_{* per team}

== Singles entrants ==
=== Seeds ===
Country	Player	Rank^{1}	Seed
SUI	Timea Bacsinszky	10	1
SRB	Ana Ivanovic	12	2
ITA	Sara Errani	18	3
GER	Andrea Petkovic	20	4
SRB	Jelena Janković	24	5
USA	Sloane Stephens	30	6
CZE	Barbora Strýcová	38	7
GER	Annika Beck	41	8

- Rankings as of 12 October 2015

=== Other entrants ===
The following players received wildcards into the singles main draw:

- (France) Tessah Andrianjafitrimo
- (Luxembourg) Mandy Minella
- (Switzerland) Stefanie Vögele

The following players received entry from the qualifying draw:

- (Slovakia) Jana Čepelová
- (France) Julie Coin
- (Netherlands) Richèl Hogenkamp
- (United States) Anna Tatishvili

The following players received entry as lucky losers:

- (France) Océane Dodin
- (Germany) Laura Siegemund

=== Withdrawals ===
Before the tournament

- (Germany) Julia Görges (right neck injury)→replaced by (France) Océane Dodin
- (Slovakia) Daniela Hantuchová →replaced by (Czech Republic) Denisa Allertová
- (Czech Republic) Lucie Hradecká (change of schedule)→replaced by (Germany) Laura Siegemund
- (United States) Madison Keys →replaced by (Germany) Anna-Lena Friedsam
- (Germany) Sabine Lisicki →replaced by (Romania) Andreea Mitu
- (Slovakia) Magdaléna Rybáriková →replaced by (Poland) Urszula Radwańska
- (Italy) Roberta Vinci →replaced by (Japan) Misaki Doi

=== Retirements ===
- (Poland) Urszula Radwańska (low back injury)
- (Switzerland) Timea Bacsinszky (left knee injury)
- (Belgium) Alison Van Uytvanck (viral illness)

== Doubles entrants ==
=== Seeds ===
Country	Player	Country	Player	Rank^{1}	Seed
ESP	Anabel Medina Garrigues	ESP	Arantxa Parra Santonja	67	1
NED	Kiki Bertens	SWE	Johanna Larsson	80	2
GER	Mona Barthel	GER	Laura Siegemund	141	3
BEL	Ysaline Bonaventure	LIE	Stephanie Vogt	165	4

- ^{1} Rankings as of 12 October 2015

=== Other entrants ===
The following pair received a wildcard into the doubles main draw:

- (Italy) Claudia Coppola / (Spain) Sílvia Soler Espinosa
