= 2013 BGL Luxembourg Open – Doubles =

Doubles
- 2013 BGL Luxembourg Open

Final
- Champions: (Liechtenstein) Stephanie Vogt (Belgium) Yanina Wickmayer
- Runners-up: (Germany) Kristina Barrois (France) Laura Thorpe
- Score: 7–6^{(7–2)}, 6–4

Events
Singles	Doubles
← 2012 ·	BGL Luxembourg Open	· 2014 →

Andrea Hlaváčková and Lucie Hradecká were the defending champions, but chose not to participate.
Stephanie Vogt and Yanina Wickmayer won the title, defeating Kristina Barrois and Laura Thorpe in the final, 7–6^{(7–2)}, 6–4.

== Seeds ==
1. (Russia) Nadia Petrova / (Slovenia) Katarina Srebotnik (semifinals)
2. (France) Kristina Mladenovic / (Poland) Katarzyna Piter (quarterfinals)
3. (Spain) Lourdes Domínguez Lino / (Romania) Monica Niculescu (first round)
4. (Croatia) Darija Jurak / (Czech Republic) Renata Voráčová (first round)

== Draw ==
=== Key ===
- Q = Qualifier
- WC = Wild card
- LL = Lucky loser
- Alt = Alternate
- SE = Special exempt
- PR = Protected ranking
- ITF = ITF entry
- JE = Junior exempt
- w/o = Walkover
- r = Retired
- d = Defaulted
- SR = Special ranking

=== Draw ===
First round
1	(Russia) N Petrova (Slovenia) K Srebotnik	6	6
(Greece) E Daniilidou (Serbia) A Krunić	3	3
(United Kingdom) N Slater (United Kingdom) M South	4	5
(Canada) G Dabrowski (United Kingdom) H Watson	6	7
4	(Croatia) D Jurak (Czech Republic) R Voráčová	7^{7}	4	[7]
(Germany) K Barrois (France) L Thorpe	6^{5}	6	[10]
(Romania) E Bogdan (Spain) MT Torró Flor	6	7
(Germany) M Barthel (Austria) S Klemenschits	3	5
WC	(Luxembourg) M Minella (Switzerland) S Vögele	6	3	[4]
(Latvia) L Dekmeijere (United States) C McHale	2	6	[10]
(Liechtenstein) S Vogt (Belgium) Y Wickmayer	6	4	[12]
3	(Spain) L Domínguez Lino (Romania) M Niculescu	3	6	[10]
(Chinese Taipei) S-y Hsieh (Chinese Taipei) S-w Hsieh	2	7^{7}	[7]
(Slovenia) P Hercog (United States) L Raymond	6	6^{5}	[10]
(France) S Foretz Gacon (Czech Republic) E Hrdinová	4	2
2	(France) K Mladenovic (Poland) K Piter	6	6

Quarterfinals
1	(Russia) N Petrova (Slovenia) K Srebotnik	6	6
(Canada) G Dabrowski (United Kingdom) H Watson	1	4
(Germany) K Barrois (France) L Thorpe	6	6
(Romania) E Bogdan (Spain) MT Torró Flor	4	3
(Latvia) L Dekmeijere (United States) C McHale	6^{2}	6	[3]
(Liechtenstein) S Vogt (Belgium) Y Wickmayer	7^{7}	4	[10]
(Slovenia) P Hercog (United States) L Raymond	7^{7}	6^{3}	[10]
2	(France) K Mladenovic (Poland) K Piter	6^{5}	7^{7}	[8]

Semifinals
1	(Russia) N Petrova (Slovenia) K Srebotnik	2	6	[8]
(Germany) K Barrois (France) L Thorpe	6	3	[10]
(Liechtenstein) S Vogt (Belgium) Y Wickmayer	0
(Slovenia) P Hercog (United States) L Raymond	1^{r}

Final
(Germany) K Barrois (France) L Thorpe	6^{2}	4
(Liechtenstein) S Vogt (Belgium) Y Wickmayer	7^{7}	6
