= 2013 BGL Luxembourg Open – Singles =

Singles
- 2013 BGL Luxembourg Open

Final
- Champion: (Denmark) Caroline Wozniacki
- Runner-up: (Germany) Annika Beck
- Score: 6–2, 6–2

Details
- Draw: 32
- Seeds: 8

Events
Singles	Doubles
- BGL Luxembourg Open

Venus Williams was the defending champion, but decided not to participate.
Caroline Wozniacki won the title, defeating Annika Beck in the final, 6–2, 6–2.

== Seeds ==
1. (Denmark) Caroline Wozniacki (champion)
2. (United States) Sloane Stephens (quarterfinals)
3. (Germany) Sabine Lisicki (semifinals)
4. (Belgium) Kirsten Flipkens (first round)
5. (Czech Republic) Lucie Šafářová (second round)
6. (Germany) Mona Barthel (first round)
7. (Canada) Eugenie Bouchard (first round)
8. (Serbia) Bojana Jovanovski (quarterfinals)

== Draw ==
Key

- Q = Qualifier
- WC = Wild card
- LL = Lucky loser
- Alt = Alternate
- ITF = ITF entry
- PR = Protected ranking
- SR = Special ranking
- SE = Special exempt
- JE = Junior exempt
- JR = Junior Accelerator Programme entrant
- CO = College Accelerator Programme entrant
- NG = Next Gen Accelerator Program entrant
- w/o = Walkover
- r = Retired
- d = Defaulted

=== Finals ===
Semifinals
1	(Denmark) Caroline Wozniacki	6	6
3	(Germany) Sabine Lisicki	4	4
(Germany) Annika Beck	7	1
(Switzerland) Stefanie Vögele	5	0^{r}

Final
1	(Denmark) Caroline Wozniacki	6	6
(Germany) Annika Beck	2	2

=== Top half ===
First round
1	(Denmark) C Wozniacki	6	7^{7}
WC	(Luxembourg) M Minella	3	6^{2}
(Romania) A Cadanțu	5	4
(Romania) M Niculescu	7	6
(Chinese Taipei) S-w Hsieh	4	7^{7}	6
Q	(Slovakia) K Kučová	6	6^{2}	3
(Italy) F Schiavone	4	3
8	(Serbia) B Jovanovski	6	6
3	(Germany) S Lisicki	2	6	6
(Croatia) D Vekić	6	3	0
(France) K Mladenovic	5	1
Q	(Czech Republic) T Smitková	7	6
(Italy) K Knapp	4	6	6
Q	(Kazakhstan) S Karatantcheva	6	3	3
(Germany) A Petkovic	2	7	6
7	(Canada) E Bouchard	6	5	1

Second round
1	(Denmark) C Wozniacki	6	6
(Romania) M Niculescu	3	2
(Chinese Taipei) S-w Hsieh	1	4
8	(Serbia) B Jovanovski	6	6
3	(Germany) S Lisicki	6	6
Q	(Czech Republic) T Smitková	4	0
(Italy) K Knapp	7	7
(Germany) A Petkovic	5	5

Quarterfinals
1	(Denmark) C Wozniacki	6	3	6
8	(Serbia) B Jovanovski	3	6	3
3	(Germany) S Lisicki	7	4	6
(Italy) K Knapp	5	6	0

Semifinals
1	(Denmark) C Wozniacki	6	6
3	(Germany) S Lisicki	4	4

=== Bottom half ===
First round
5	(Czech Republic) L Šafářová	7	6
(China) S Peng	5	4
(Bulgaria) T Pironkova	2	2
(Germany) A Beck	6	6
WC	(United Kingdom) H Watson	0	7	2
(Belgium) Y Wickmayer	6	5	6
Q	(Poland) K Piter	6	6
4	(Belgium) K Flipkens	4	2
6	(Germany) M Barthel	6	4	6^{3}
(Switzerland) S Vögele	1	6	7^{7}
(Spain) L Domínguez Lino	7	5	1
(Czech Republic) Ka Plíšková	5	7	6
(Austria) Y Meusburger	6	6
(Romania) I-C Begu	4	2
WC	(Switzerland) T Bacsinszky	3	3
2	(United States) S Stephens	6	6

Second round
5	(Czech Republic) L Šafářová	2	6	4
(Germany) A Beck	6	4	6
(Belgium) Y Wickmayer	6	1	4
Q	(Poland) K Piter	3	6	6
(Switzerland) S Vögele	6	3	6
(Czech Republic) Ka Plíšková	1	6	3
(Austria) Y Meusburger	5	4
2	(United States) S Stephens	7	6

Quarterfinals
(Germany) A Beck	6	6^{3}	7^{7}
Q	(Poland) K Piter	3	7^{7}	6^{5}
(Switzerland) S Vögele	6	3	6
2	(United States) S Stephens	3	6	2

Semifinals
(Germany) A Beck	7	1
(Switzerland) S Vögele	5	0^{r}

== Qualifying ==
=== Seeds ===
1. (United States) Alison Riske (second round)
2. (Spain) María Teresa Torró Flor (first round)
3. (United States) Christina McHale (second round)
4. (Kazakhstan) Yulia Putintseva (first round)
5. (Italy) Camila Giorgi (second round)
6. (Ukraine) Maryna Zanevska (first round)
7. (Belgium) Alison van Uytvanck (qualifying competition)
8. (United States) Grace Min (qualifying competition)

=== Qualifiers ===
1. (Slovakia) Kristina Kučová
2. (Kazakhstan) Sesil Karatantcheva
3. (Poland) Katarzyna Piter
4. (Czech Republic) Tereza Smitková

=== Qualifying draw ===
==== First qualifier ====
First round
1	(United States) Alison Riske	6	3	6
(Serbia) Aleksandra Krunić	3	6	4
(Latvia) Diāna Marcinkēviča	2	4
(Netherlands) Lesley Kerkhove	6	6
(Poland) Katarzyna Kawa	4	0
(Slovakia) Kristina Kučová	6	6
(Germany) Kristina Barrois	6	6
6	(Ukraine) Maryna Zanevska	3	3

Second round
1	(United States) Alison Riske	6^{3}	6^{5}
(Netherlands) Lesley Kerkhove	7^{7}	7^{7}
(Slovakia) Kristina Kučová	4	7	4
(Germany) Kristina Barrois	6	5	1^{r}

Qualifying competition
(Netherlands) Lesley Kerkhove	4	3
(Slovakia) Kristina Kučová	6	6

==== Second qualifier ====
First round
2	(Spain) María Teresa Torró Flor	6	2	4
(France) Alizé Lim	3	6	6
(Kazakhstan) Sesil Karatantcheva	6	6
(Czech Republic) Renata Voráčová	1	2
(Russia) Marta Sirotkina	5	6	1
(France) Stéphanie Foretz Gacon	7	4	6
(Greece) Eleni Daniilidou	2	3
8	(United States) Grace Min	6	6

Second round
(France) Alizé Lim	5	1
(Kazakhstan) Sesil Karatantcheva	7	6
(France) Stéphanie Foretz Gacon	2	1
8	(United States) Grace Min	6	6

Qualifying competition
(Kazakhstan) Sesil Karatantcheva	1	6	6
8	(United States) Grace Min	6	1	2

==== Third qualifier ====
First round
3	(United States) Christina McHale	6^{5}	6	6
(Italy) Nastassja Burnett	7^{7}	2	3
WC	(Germany) Katharina Hobgarski	0	1
(Poland) Katarzyna Piter	6	6
WC	(Luxembourg) Tiffany Cornelius	1	0
(Germany) Carina Witthöft	6	6
(Italy) Camilla Rosatello	2	2
5	(Italy) Camila Giorgi	6	6

Second round
3	(United States) Christina McHale	6^{4}	4
(Poland) Katarzyna Piter	7^{7}	6
(Germany) Carina Witthöft	7^{7}	6
5	(Italy) Camila Giorgi	6^{5}	2

Qualifying competition
(Poland) Katarzyna Piter	6	6
(Germany) Carina Witthöft	3	2

==== Fourth qualifier ====
First round
4	(Kazakhstan) Yulia Putintseva	3	3
(Czech Republic) Tereza Smitková	6	6
WC	(Greece) Despina Papamichail	6	6
WC	(Croatia) Tena Lukas	1	1
(Liechtenstein) Stephanie Vogt	6	6
(United Kingdom) Melanie South	1	2
(Czech Republic) Kateřina Vaňková	3	1
7	(Belgium) Alison van Uytvanck	6	6

Second round
(Czech Republic) Tereza Smitková	7	6
WC	(Greece) Despina Papamichail	5	2
(Liechtenstein) Stephanie Vogt	7	2	4
7	(Belgium) Alison van Uytvanck	5	6	6

Qualifying competition
(Czech Republic) Tereza Smitková	6	6
7	(Belgium) Alison van Uytvanck	4	3
