= 2013 BGL Luxembourg Open =

- Date: 14–20 October
- Edition: 18th
- Category: WTA International
- Draw: 32S / 16D
- Prize money: $235,000
- Surface: Hard / indoor
- Location: Kockelscheuer, Luxembourg

Champions

Singles
- (Denmark) Caroline Wozniacki

Doubles
- (Liechtenstein) Stephanie Vogt / (Belgium) Yanina Wickmayer
← 2012 ·	BGL Luxembourg Open	· 2014 →

The 2013 BGL Luxembourg Open was a women's tennis tournament played on indoor hard courts sponsored by BNP Paribas. It was the 18th edition of the BGL Luxembourg Open, and part of the WTA International tournaments of the 2013 WTA Tour. It was held in Kockelscheuer, Luxembourg from 14 October until 20 October 2013.

== Finals ==
=== Singles ===
- (Denmark) Caroline Wozniacki defeated (Germany) Annika Beck, 6–2, 6–2

=== Doubles ===
- (Liechtenstein) Stephanie Vogt / (Belgium) Yanina Wickmayer defeated (Germany) Kristina Barrois / (France) Laura Thorpe, 7–6^{(7–2)}, 6–4

== Singles main-draw entrants ==
=== Seeds ===
Country	Player	Rank^{1}	Seed
DEN	Caroline Wozniacki	9	1
USA	Sloane Stephens	12	2
GER	Sabine Lisicki	14	3
BEL	Kirsten Flipkens	19	4
CZE	Lucie Šafářová	28	5
GER	Mona Barthel	34	6
CAN	Eugenie Bouchard	35	7
SRB	Bojana Jovanovski	37	8

- Rankings are as of October 7, 2013

=== Other entrants ===
The following players received wildcards into the singles main draw:

- (Switzerland) Timea Bacsinszky
- (Luxembourg) Mandy Minella
- (United Kingdom) Heather Watson

The following players received entry from the qualifying draw:

- (Kazakhstan) Sesil Karatancheva
- (Slovakia) Kristina Kučová
- (Poland) Katarzyna Piter
- (Czech Republic) Tereza Smitková

=== Withdrawals ===
Before the tournament

- (Romania) Sorana Cîrstea
- (Germany) Julia Görges
- (United States) Madison Keys

=== Retirements ===
- (Switzerland) Stefanie Vögele (left thigh injury)

== Doubles main-draw entrants ==
=== Seeds ===
Country	Player	Country	Player	Rank^{1}	Seed
RUS	Nadia Petrova	SLO	Katarina Srebotnik	7	1
FRA	Kristina Mladenovic	POL	Katarzyna Piter	107	2
ESP	Lourdes Domínguez Lino	ROU	Monica Niculescu	132	3
CRO	Darija Jurak	CZE	Renata Voráčová	135	4

- ^{1} Rankings are as of October 7, 2013

=== Other entrants ===
The following pair received a wildcard into the doubles main draw:

- (Luxembourg) Mandy Minella / (Switzerland) Stefanie Vögele

=== Retirements ===
- (Slovenia) Polona Hercog (right thoracic rib injury)
