= 2014 BGL Luxembourg Open =

- Date: 13–19 October
- Edition: 19th
- Category: WTA International
- Draw: 32S / 16D
- Prize money: $250,000
- Surface: Hard (indoor)
- Location: Kockelscheuer, Luxembourg

Champions

Singles
- (Germany) Annika Beck

Doubles
- (Switzerland) Timea Bacsinszky / (Germany) Kristina Barrois
← 2013 ·	Luxembourg Open	· 2015 →

The 2014 BGL Luxembourg Open was a women's tennis tournament played on indoor hard courts sponsored by BNP Paribas. It was the 19th edition of the Luxembourg Open, and part of the WTA International tournaments category of the 2014 WTA Tour. It was held in Kockelscheuer, Luxembourg on 13–19 October 2014. Unseeded Annika Beck won the singles title.

== Finals ==
=== Singles ===
- (Germany) Annika Beck defeated (Czech Republic) Barbora Záhlavová-Strýcová 6–2, 6–1

=== Doubles ===
- (Switzerland) Timea Bacsinszky / (Germany) Kristina Barrois defeated (Czech Republic) Lucie Hradecká / (Czech Republic) Barbora Krejčíková 3–6, 6–4, [10–4]

== Points and prize money ==
=== Point distribution ===
Event	W	F	SF	QF	Round of 16	Round of 32	Q	Q3	Q2	Q1
Singles	280	180	110	60	30	1	18	14	10	1
Doubles	280	180	110	60	1	—	—	—	—	—

=== Prize money ===
Event	W	F	SF	QF	Round of 16	Round of 32^{1}	Q3	Q2	Q1
Singles	€34,677	€17,258	€9,113	€4,758	€2,669	€1,552	€810	€589	€427
Doubles *	€9,919	€5,161	€2,770	€1,468	€774	—	—	—	—

_{^{1} Qualifiers prize money is also the Round of 32 prize money}
_{* per team}

== Singles entrants ==
=== Seeds ===
Country	Player	Rank^{1}	Seed
GER	Andrea Petkovic	16	1
FRA	Alizé Cornet	21	2
GER	Sabine Lisicki	25	3
CZE	Barbora Záhlavová-Strýcová	28	4
USA	Varvara Lepchenko	39	5
ITA	Roberta Vinci	41	6
BEL	Kirsten Flipkens	43	7
ROU	Monica Niculescu	45	8

- Rankings as of 6 October 2014

=== Other entrants ===
The following players received wildcards into the singles main draw:

- (Germany) Julia Görges
- (Germany) Antonia Lottner
- (Luxembourg) Mandy Minella

The following player received entry as a special exempt:

- (Germany) Anna-Lena Friedsam

The following players received entry from the qualifying draw:

- (Czech Republic) Denisa Allertová
- (Czech Republic) Lucie Hradecká
- (Tunisia) Ons Jabeur
- (Sweden) Johanna Larsson

=== Withdrawals ===
Before the tournament

- (Belarus) Victoria Azarenka (foot injury) → replaced by (Slovenia) Polona Hercog
- (Canada) Eugenie Bouchard (left thigh injury) → replaced by (New Zealand) Marina Erakovic
- (Estonia) Kaia Kanepi → replaced by (Switzerland) Timea Bacsinszky
- (Spain) Garbiñe Muguruza → replaced by (Belgium) Alison Van Uytvanck
- (Slovakia) Anna Karolína Schmiedlová → replaced by (Austria) Patricia Mayr-Achleitner
- (United Kingdom) Heather Watson → replaced by (Netherlands) Kiki Bertens

=== Retirements ===
- (Italy) Karin Knapp (left thigh injury)

== Doubles entrants ==
=== Seeds ===
Country	Player	Country	Player	Rank^{1}	Seed
ESP	Anabel Medina Garrigues	ESP	Sílvia Soler Espinosa	71	1
GER	Julia Görges	GER	Anna-Lena Grönefeld	74	2
CZE	Lucie Hradecká	CZE	Barbora Krejčíková	176	3
GER	Mona Barthel	LUX	Mandy Minella	198	4

- ^{1} Rankings as of 6 October 2014
