= Claudia Coppola =

Italian tennis player

- Country (sports): Italy
- Born: 4 December 1994 (age 30); Naples (ITA)
- Height: 166 cm (5 ft 5 in)
- Turned pro: January 2009
- Retired: 2020
- Plays: Right-handed (two-handed backhand)
- Prize money: $31,124

Singles
- Career record: 97–159
- Career titles: 0
- Highest ranking: No. 631 (14 January 2019)
- Current ranking: No. 0

Doubles
- Career record: 20–60
- Career titles: 0
- Highest ranking: No. 509 (23 September 2013)
- Current ranking: No. 0 (17 July 2017)
- Last updated on: 31 August 2019.

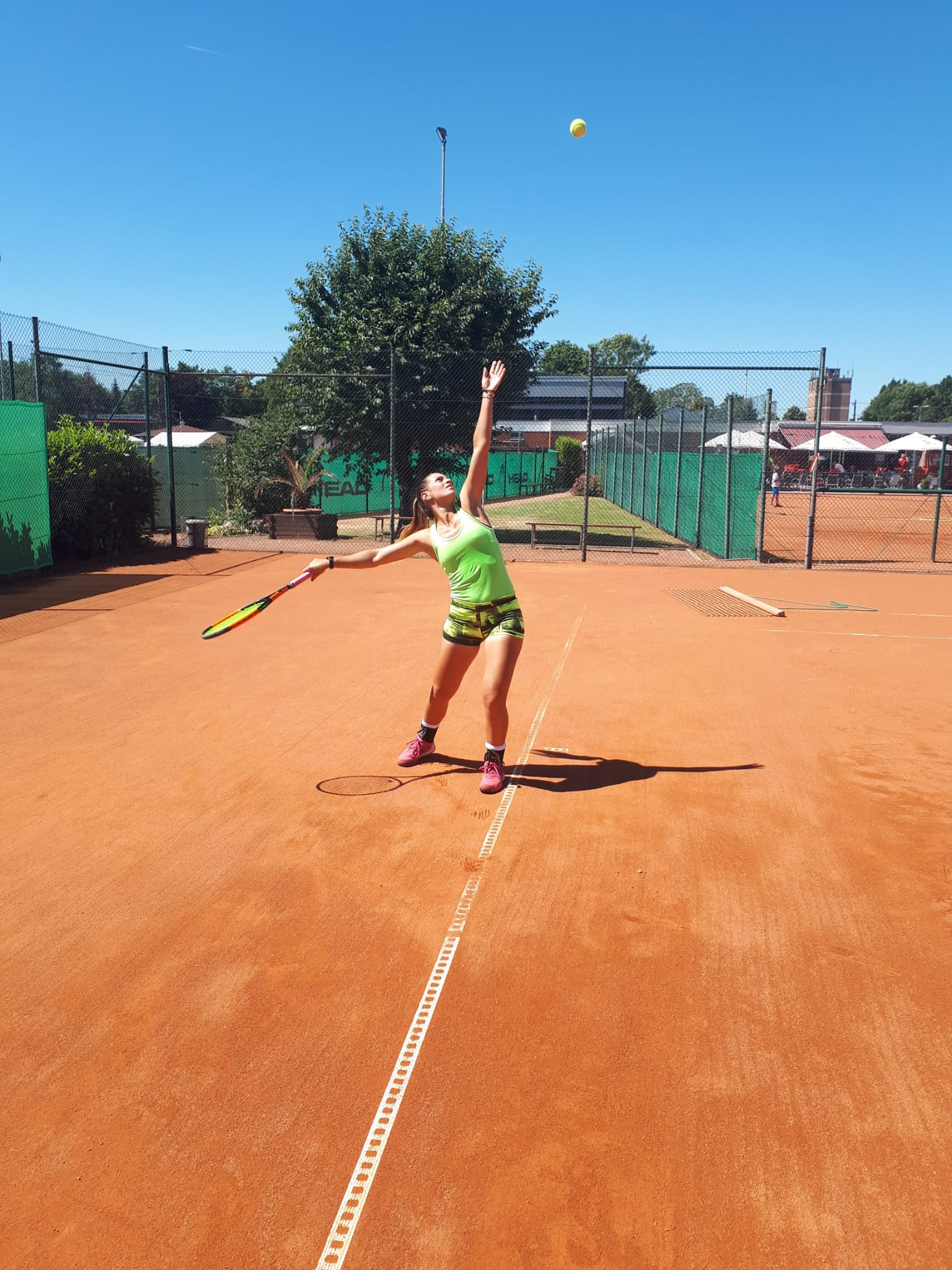

Claudia Coppola (born 4 December 1994) is an Italian retired tennis player.

Coppola has a career high WTA singles ranking of 631, achieved on 14 January 2019. She has a career high WTA doubles ranking of 509 achieved on 23 September 2013.

Coppola made her WTA main draw debut at the 2015 BGL Luxembourg Open in the doubles draw where she received a wildcard partnering Sílvia Soler Espinosa.
