= Stefanie Vögele =

Swiss tennis player (born 1990)

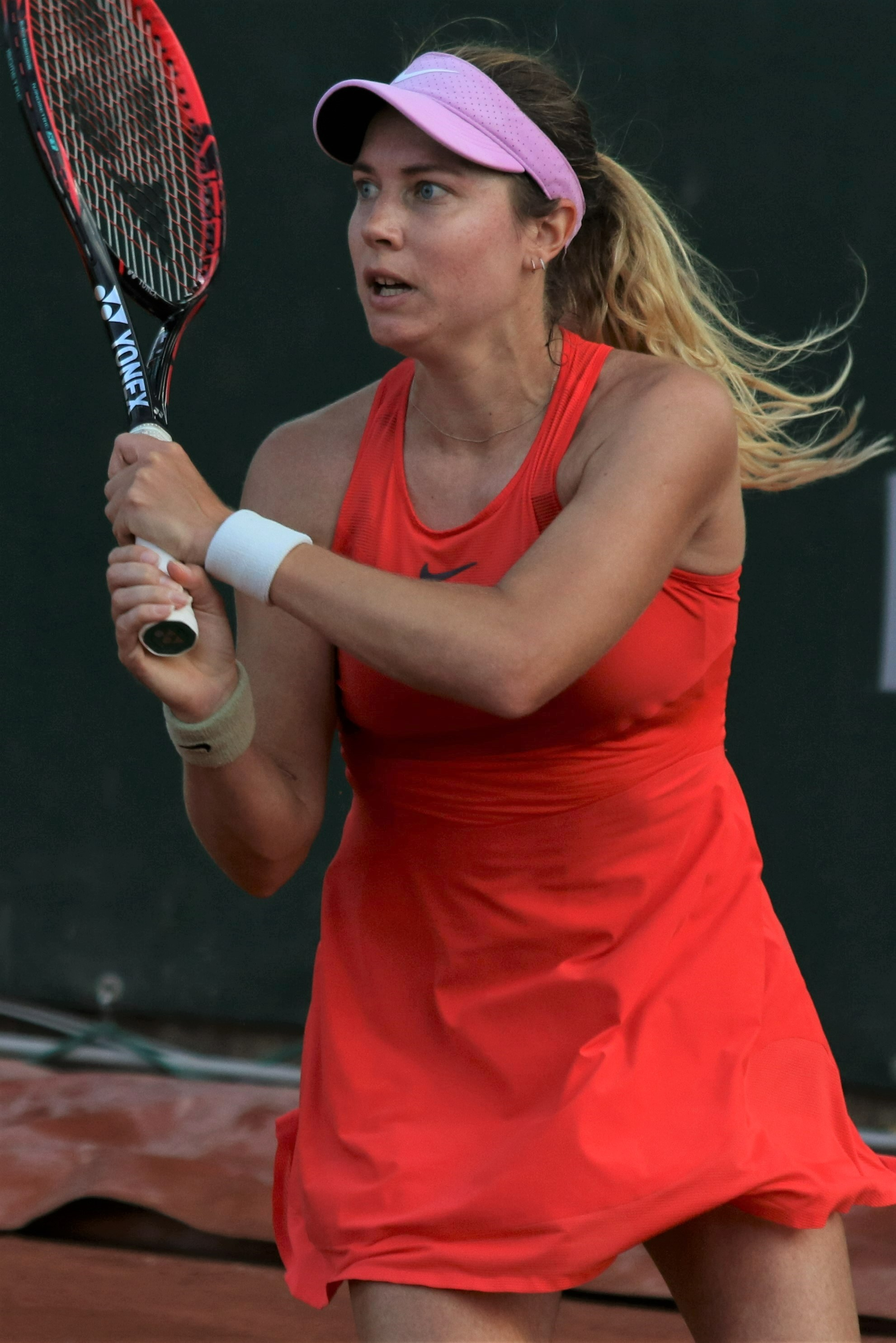
- Vögele at the 2022 French Open
- Country (sports): Switzerland
- Residence: Biel, Switzerland
- Born: 10 March 1990 (age 36) Leuggern, Switzerland
- Height: 1.70 m (5 ft 7 in)
- Turned pro: 2006
- Retired: November 2022
- Plays: Right-handed (two-handed backhand)
- Prize money: US$3,108,188

Singles
- Career record: 474–425
- Career titles: 8 ITF
- Highest ranking: No. 42 (11 November 2013)

Grand Slam singles results
- Australian Open: 2R (2010, 2014, 2015, 2017)
- French Open: 3R (2013)
- Wimbledon: 1R (2009, 2010, 2013, 2014, 2015, 2016, 2018, 2019)
- US Open: 2R (2009)

Doubles
- Career record: 91–106
- Career titles: 5 ITF
- Highest ranking: No. 100 (5 January 2015)

Grand Slam doubles results
- Australian Open: 2R (2014)
- French Open: 2R (2010, 2014)
- Wimbledon: 3R (2014)
- US Open: 2R (2009)

Team competitions
- Fed Cup: 6–15

Stefanie Vögele (born 10 March 1990) is a Swiss professional tennis player. She achieved a career-high singles ranking of world No. 42 on 11 November 2013. Her highest WTA ranking in doubles is 100, which she reached on 5 January 2015. Over her career, she has defeated top ten players Sloane Stephens and Caroline Wozniacki.

Vögele announced her retirement from tennis in November 2022. She had a short comeback in 2025 with two first-round losses on ITF single events, and again lost in the first round at the 2025 French Open and Wimbledon. There has been no more appearances since then.

== Biography ==
Vögele who has three sisters was introduced to tennis at the age of four by her parents. Her coach was Ivo Werner.

== Professional ==
=== 2009 ===
For the first five months of the year, Vögele participated in several WTA Tour events, needing to play through the qualifying rounds of most tournaments. During this period, she never won a main-draw match in such an event.

In June, Vögele played in Birmingham, defeating seeded Ekaterina Makarova en route to a quarterfinal showing. Playing at Wimbledon for the first time, she lost to defending champion Venus Williams in the first round.

Vögele had strong showings in July, advancing to the second round and semifinals in Prague and Portorož, respectively.

=== 2010–2011 ===
Vögele began the season at Auckland and lost in the first round to Sania Mirza. At Sydney, she was defeated in the first round of qualifying by Chang Kai-chen. At the Australian Open, she made it to the second round where she lost to seventh seed Victoria Azarenka.

Playing as a wildcard at Dubai, Vögele upset 15th seed Nadia Petrova in the first round and was defeated in the second by Russian qualifier Regina Kulikova. At the Malaysian Open, Vögele lost in the first round to Chanelle Scheepers. In March, she competed at Indian Wells where she was defeated in the first round by qualifier Chan Yung-jan. Vögele fell in the first round of the Miami Open to Alizé Cornet.

At her first clay-court tournament of the season, in Andalucia, she lost in the first round to fifth seed María José Martínez Sánchez. Staying in Spain to play at the Barcelona Open, Vögele was defeated in the first round by wildcard Arantxa Parra Santonja.

=== 2012 ===
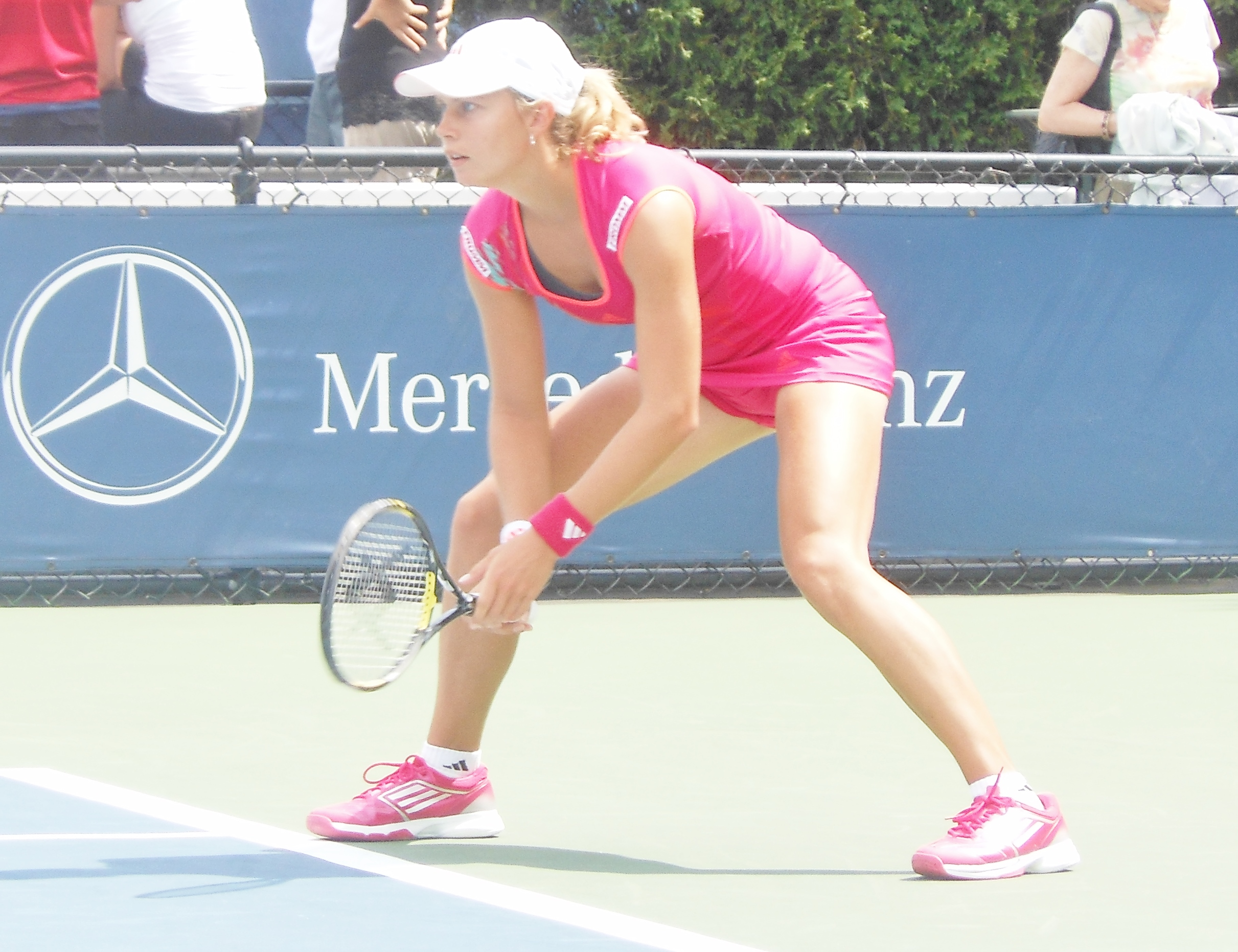
Vögele at the 2012 US Open

She began the season at Brisbane where she defeated Australian wildcard Sally Peers in the first round of qualifying, and in the second Akgul Amanmuradova. However, in the final round, she lost to top seed Vania King. At Sydney, Vögele qualified by defeating Victoria Larrière, Michaëlla Krajicek, and Bojana Jovanovski. In the first round, she lost to third seed and eventual champion, Victoria Azarenka, in straight sets. As the 20th seed, Vögele qualified for the Australian Open by defeating Lara Arruabarrena, Mihaela Buzărnescu, and Michelle Larcher de Brito. In the main draw, she lost to 14th seed Sabine Lisicki, in three sets.

At the Copa Colsanitas, she lost in the first round to top seed Marina Erakovic. However, in doubles, Vögele and her partner Mandy Minella reached the final where they lost to top seeds Eva Birnerová/Alexandra Panova, 2–6, 2–6. At the Monterrey Open, she lost in the first round to third seed Sorana Cîrstea. Then Vögele competed at the $25k tournament in Clearwater, Florida. She defeated Allie Kiick and Hsieh Su-wei, and in the quarterfinals, Camila Giorgi. In the semifinals, she lost to Garbiñe Muguruza, 1–6, 2–6. At the Miami Open, Vögele lost in the first round of qualifying to 24th seed Valeria Savinykh. At the $50k tournament in Osprey, Florida, she defeated Mirjana Lučić-Baroni, before losing to Edina Gallovits.

Vögele, as the ninth seed, qualified for the Charleston Open by defeating Ani Mijačika and 16th seed Caroline Garcia. In the first round, she defeated Jarmila Gajdošová in three sets, and in the second Lucie Hradecká. In the third round, Vögele lost to fourth seed Vera Zvonareva. At the Danish Open, she lost in round one to Bojana Jovanovski. Seeded fourth for qualifying at Budapest, she lost in the first round to Rika Fujiwara in two tiebreakers. At the $100k tournament in Prague, she defeated Stéphanie Foretz in the first round but then, she withdrew from her match against Ayumi Morita. Seeded ninth for qualifying at the French Open, Vögele beat Noppawan Lertcheewakarn in the first round 6–0, 6–4. In the second round of qualifying, Vögele lost to Julia Cohen.

Seeded eighth for qualifying at Wimbledon, Vögele defeated Grace Min in the first round and in the second, she lost to Kristýna Plíšková in three sets.

At the $100k tournament in Biella, she was beaten in the first round by Alexandra Cadanţu. At the $100k event in Biarritz, Vögele defeated Amra Sadiković in three sets, before she lost to Romina Oprandi. At the $100k event in Bucharest, she lost in the second round to Irina-Camelia Begu. At the $100k tournament in Olomouc against Yvonne Meusburger, Vögele suffered another first-round loss.

As the 27th seed, she qualified for the US Open by defeating Petra Rampre, Ekaterina Bychkova, and Heidi El Tabakh, before losing to fellow qualifier Edina Gallovits-Hall in two sets.

Vögele lost in the final of the $75k event in Shrewsbury to Annika Beck, in straight sets. However, she bounced back by winning the $25k tournament in Clermont-Ferrand defeating Tatjana Malek in the final, in straight sets. At the Ladies Linz, Vögele beat Malek in the first round of qualifying, but in the second she lost to top seed Irina-Camelia Begu. She lost her semifinal at the $50k event in Limoges to Claire Feuerstein in a narrow three-setter. At the $100k tournament in Poitiers, she lost in the quarterfinals to Monica Puig.

=== 2013 ===
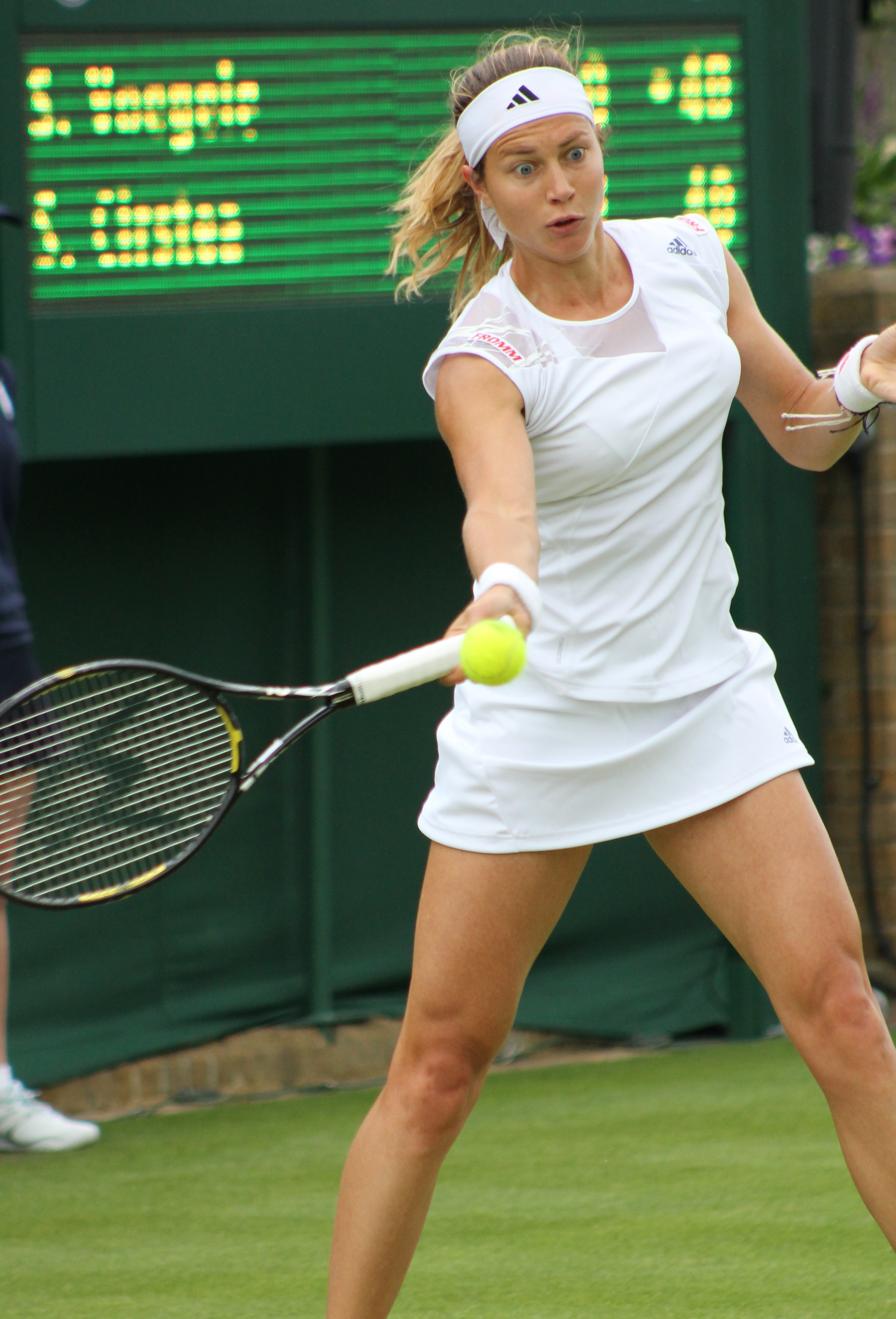
Vögele at the 2013 Wimbledon Championships

Vögele began the year by playing at the first edition of the Shenzhen Open. As the top seed in qualifying, she qualified by beating Zarina Diyas and fifth seed Caroline Garcia. In the first round, she defeated Tímea Babos. In the second round, Vögele lost to second seed Marion Bartoli. Competing in Melbourne at the Australian Open, Vögele lost in the first round to 30th seed Tamira Paszek.

Vögele qualified for the Paris Indoors by defeating eighth seed Mandy Minella, Stéphanie Foretz, and Monica Puig. After winning her first-round match over Tsvetana Pironkova, she lost in the second round to second seed and 2011 Open GdF Suez champion, Petra Kvitová. Vögele reached the semifinals of the U.S. Indoor Championships by defeating Sílvia Soler Espinosa, qualifier Claire Feuerstein, and fourth seed Heather Watson. She was defeated in her semifinal match by eventual champion Marina Erakovic. As the top seed for qualifying at the Indian Wells Open, Vögele lost in the final round of qualifying to 17th seed Mirjana Lučić-Baroni. After losing in the final round of qualifying, she received a lucky loser spot into the main draw. She defeated Petra Martić, before she lost in the second round to tenth seed Nadia Petrova. Seeded second for qualifying at the Miami Open, Vögele qualified for the main draw by beating Alexandra Cadanţu and 21st seed Galina Voskoboeva. In the first round, she again defeated Petra Martić. Vögele was defeated in the second round by 30th seed Kirsten Flipkens.

Vögele began her clay-court season at Charleston where she started off the tournament by defeating qualifier Teliana Pereira in the first round. In the second round, she upset seventh seed Carla Suárez Navarro. In the third round, she upset 10th seed Julia Görges. In the quarterfinals, Vögele had a huge win over 2011 Charleston champion, second seed, and former world No. 1, Caroline Wozniacki. With this win, she reached her second semifinal of the year. Vögele lost in the semifinal to another former world No. 1, Jelena Janković. Playing against Australia at the 2013 Fed Cup World Group play-offs, Vögele lost both of her rubbers to Ashleigh Barty and Samantha Stosur. Australia defeated Switzerland 3–1. Seeded third for qualifying at the Madrid Open, Vögele lost in the final round of qualifying to 13th seed Lesia Tsurenko. However, she entered the main draw as a lucky loser but was defeated in the first round by wildcard Anabel Medina Garrigues. Seeded second for qualifying at the Italian Open, Vögele lost in the first round of qualifying to María Teresa Torró Flor. Playing at the Brussels Open, Vögele was defeated in the first round by wildcard Elena Baltacha. Ranked 56 at the French Open, Vögele advanced to the third round of a major for the first time in her career. She started off with a three-set victory over Heather Watson in the first round. In the second round, she won a three-set thriller over Kaia Kanepi. Her run came to an end as she lost in round three to 12th seed Maria Kirilenko.

Vögele began her grass-court season at the Rosmalen Open where she defeated qualifier Yulia Putintseva, before losing in the second round to lucky loser Lesia Tsurenko. At Wimbledon, she lost in the opening round to 22nd seed Sorana Cîrstea.

Vögele began the US Open Series at the Stanford Classic where she defeated wildcard Ajla Tomljanović in the first round 6–4, 6–0. In the second round, she lost to third seed and eventual champion, Dominika Cibulková. Playing at the Washington Open, Vögele lost in the first round to sixth seed Mona Barthel. Seeded fifth for qualifying at Cincinnati, she lost in the first round to Sofia Arvidsson. Seeded fifth for qualifying at New Haven, she qualified by defeating American wildcard Katerina Stewart, Alexandra Cadanţu, and Yaroslava Shvedova but then lost to fellow qualifier Alison Riske. At the US Open, Vögele lost in the first round to world No. 105, Anna Karolína Schmiedlová.

Playing at the Pan Pacific Open, she lost in the first round to ninth seed Sloane Stephens 3–6, 2–6. At the China Open, Vögele lost in the first round to 2011 China Open champion and third seed Agnieszka Radwańska. Vögele reached her third semifinal of the year at the Ladies Linz by defeating Klára Zakopalová, Karin Knapp, and second seed Sloane Stephens. In the semifinal, she lost to third seed and eventual finalist Ana Ivanovic in straight sets. Her final tournament of the year was the Luxembourg Open where she reached the semifinals by defeating sixth seed Mona Barthel, Karolína Plíšková, and second seed Sloane Stephens. Vögele retired in her semifinal-match against eventual finalist Annika Beck at 7–5, 1–0 due to a left thigh injury.

Vögele ended the year ranked 44.

=== 2014 ===
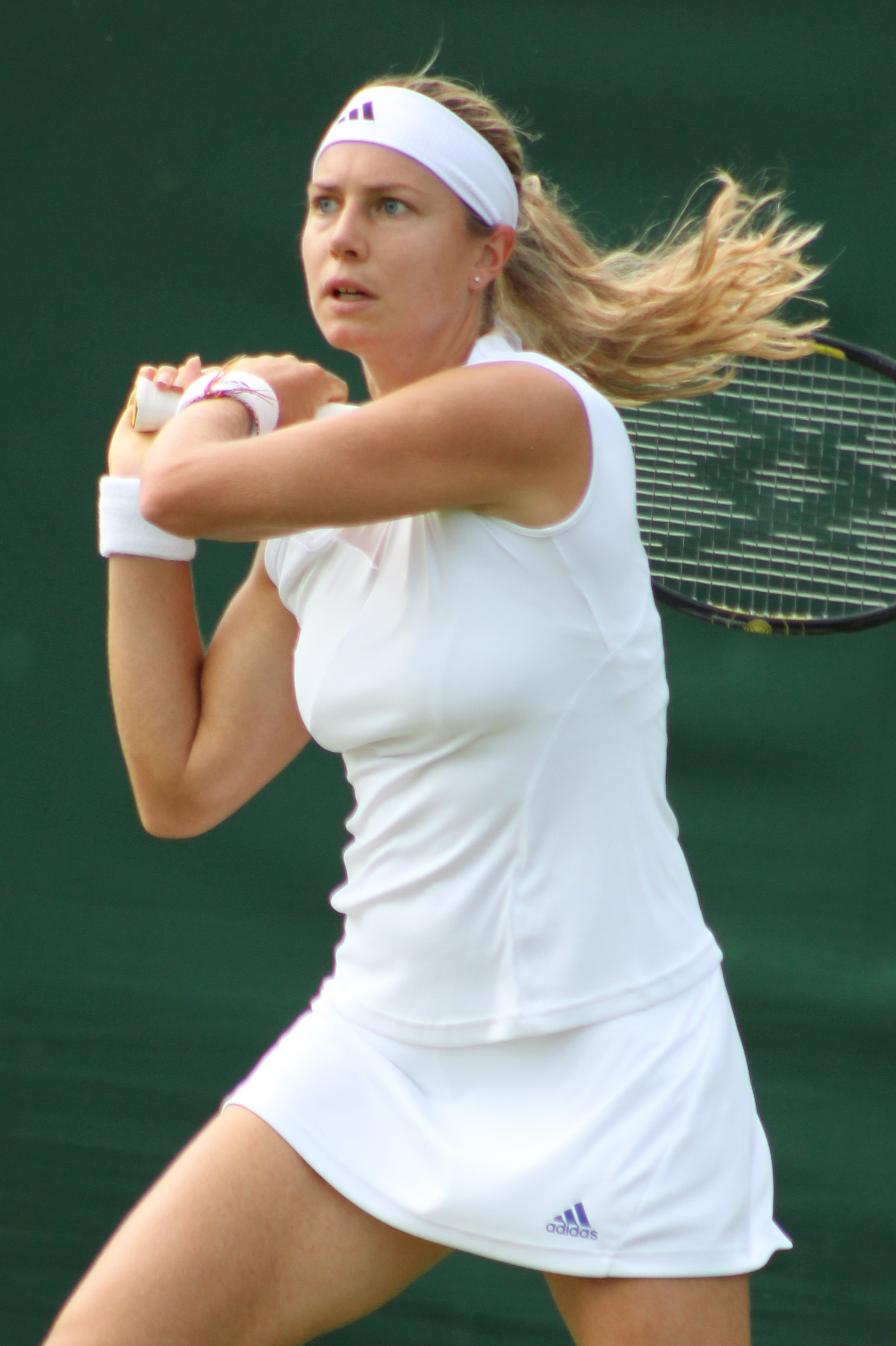
Vögele at the 2014 Wimbledon Championships

Vögele began the year by playing at Brisbane. In the first round, she defeated Madison Keys 6–4, 6–3. In the second round, she received a walkover when seventh seed Sabine Lisicki withdrew due to gastrointestinal illness. In the quarterfinals, Vögele lost to second seed and eventual finalist, Victoria Azarenka. At the Australian Open, she defeated Kristina Mladenovic in the first round 7–5, 7–5. In the second round, she lost to 20th seed and eventual finalist Dominika Cibulková, 0–6, 1–6.

After the Australian Open, Vögele competed in Paris. In the first round, she lost in a narrow match to qualifier Galina Voskoboeva. Playing against France at the 2014 Fed Cup World Group II, Vögele lost the only rubber she played to Virginie Razzano. France ended up defeating Switzerland 3–2. At the Qatar Open, Vögele defeated Alizé Cornet in the first round, 7–6, 7–5. In the second round, she lost to wildcard Alisa Kleybanova. Seeded seventh at the Mexican Open, Vögele lost in the first round to Kimiko Date-Krumm. At Indian Wells, she lost in the first round to Annika Beck in three sets. In Miami, Vögele lost in the first round to wildcard Casey Dellacqua in straight sets.

She began clay-court season at Charleston where she was the last year semifinalist. In the first round, she lost to Ajla Tomljanović. Vögele then competed at the Morocco Open. She defeated Sílvia Soler Espinosa, and in the second round, she lost to fifth seed and eventual semifinalist Garbiñe Muguruza. At the Portugal Open, she lost in the first round to Polona Hercog. At the Madrid Open, Vögele lost in the first round to qualifier Petra Cetkovská 1–6, 3–6. Seeded 12th for qualifying at the Italian Open, she defeated wildcard Corinna Dentoni in the first round of qualifying. In the final round, Vögele lost to fourth seed Christina McHale. At the Internationaux de Strasbourg, she lost in the first round to qualifier and eventual finalist Sílvia Soler Espinosa. At the French Open, she defeated Anna-Lena Friedsam in the first round, 6–7, 7–5, 6–2. In the second round, Vögele lost to 28th seed and eventual semifinalist Andrea Petkovic in three sets.

Vögele began her grass-court season at the Birmingham Classic. She lost in the first round to 12th seed Monica Puig. At the Eastbourne International, she defeated in the first round of qualifying Vesna Dolonc, and in the second, she lost to top seed Karolína Plíšková. In Wimbledon, she lost in the first round to wildcard Jarmila Gajdošová.

Vögele then played at the Gastein Ladies where she defeated Julia Görges, and in the second round, she upset fifth seed Elina Svitolina, 6–2, 7–5. In the quarterfinals, she lost to fourth seed and eventual champion Andrea Petkovic. At the İstanbul Cup, Vögele defeated Tsvetana Pironkova in the first round 6–4, 7–5. In the second, she lost this time to fourth seed Svitolina, 0–6, 3–6. At the Baku Cup, Vögele defeated Alexandra Cadanţu in the first round 6–1, 6–4. In the second round, she upset top seed Sorana Cîrstea 6–1, 6–1. In the quarterfinals, she won against last year finalist Shahar Pe'er in three sets to reach her first semifinal of the year. In the semifinals, she lost to fifth seed and eventual finalist Bojana Jovanovski in three sets.

At the Connecticut Open, Vögele lost in the first round of qualifying to American Nicole Gibbs. At the US Open, she lost in the first round to qualifier Zheng Saisai.

After the US Open, Vögele played at the Korea Open. In the first round, she lost to Kristýna Plíšková. After Korea, Vögele competed at the first edition of the Wuhan Open. Seeded 12th for qualifying, Vögele defeated wildcard Ran Tian in the first round of qualifying. In the final round of qualifying, Vögele defeated Bethanie Mattek-Sands to qualify for the main draw. In the first round, she lost to fellow qualifier and compatriot Timea Bacsinszky. Seeded eighth for qualifying at the China Open, Vögele defeated Mandy Minella in the first round 6–1, 6–2. In the final round of qualifying, she lost to Mattek-Sands. After that, she competed at Linz where she was the last year semifinalist. In the first round, she defeated sixth seed Barbora Záhlavová-Strýcová, 7–6, 7–5, and in the second round Anna Karolína Schmiedlová, 2–6, 6–1, 6–4. In the quarterfinals, Vögele lost to qualifier Anna-Lena Friedsam. Last year semifinalist at the Luxembourg Open, Vögele lost in the first round to Alison Van Uytvanck. At the $100k tournament in Poitiers, she lost in the first round to Aliaksandra Sasnovich. Her final tournament of the year was the Open de Limoges. Seeded seventh, she defeated Kateřina Siniaková in the first round, and in the second lost to lucky loser Richèl Hogenkamp.

Vögele ended the year ranked 78.

=== 2015 ===
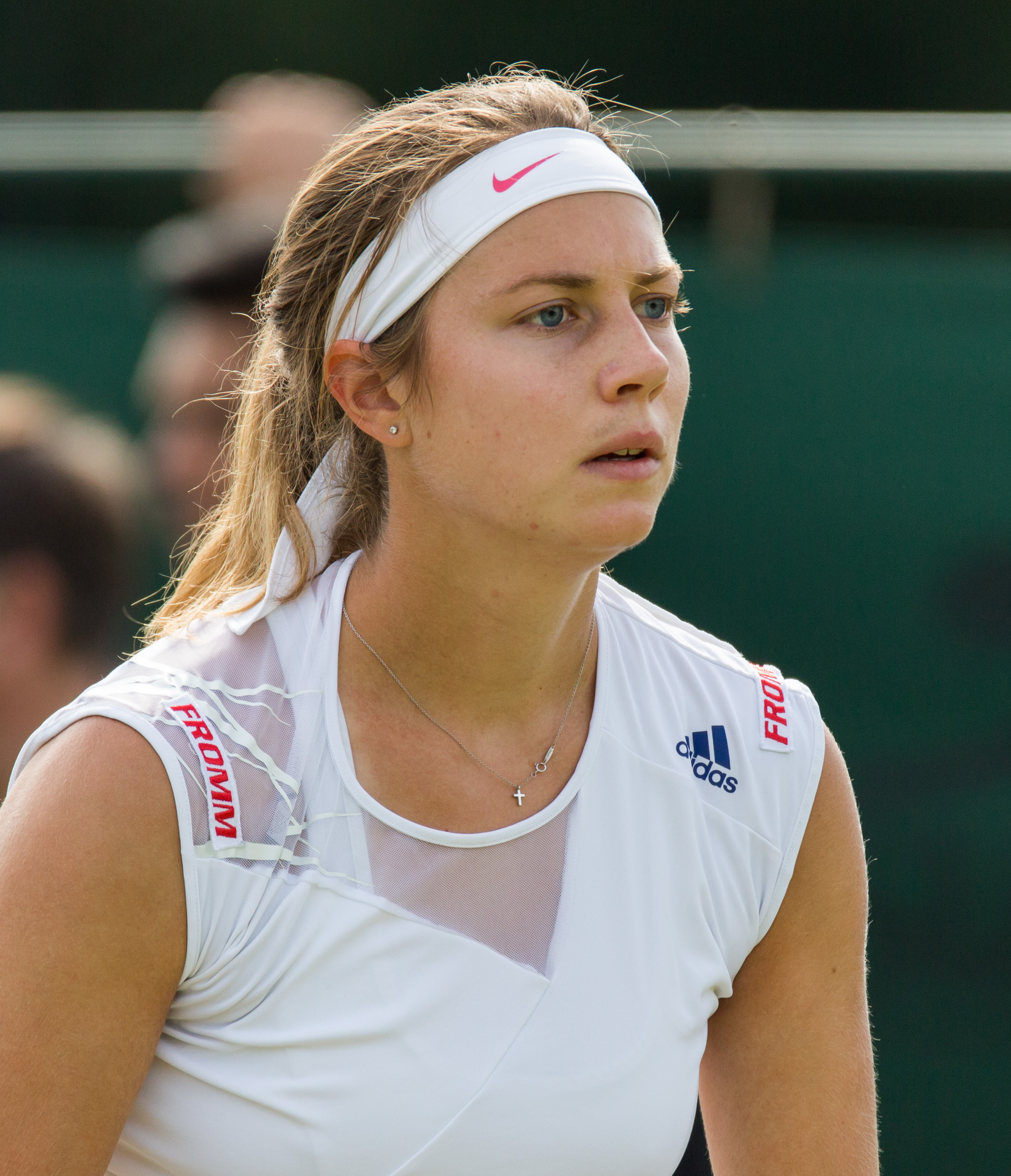
Vögele playing qualifying at the 2015 Wimbledon Championships

Vögele began the year at the Shenzhen Open. She lost in the first round to compatriot, eighth seed, and eventual finalist Timea Bacsinszky. Vögele played at the Sydney International where she defeated Australian wildcard Arina Rodionova in the first round of qualifying, 6–2, 6–3, before losing to Lesia Tsurenko. At the Australian Open, she defeated Pauline Parmentier in the first round but then was beaten by Caroline Garcia.

At the Thailand Open, Vögele lost in the first round to seventh seed Monica Puig. Seeded 11th for qualifying at Dubai, Vögele lost in the first round to Misa Eguchi. She qualified for the Qatar Open by defeating Yuliya Beygelzimer, Francesca Schiavone, and Yulia Putintseva. But in the first round, she lost to Karolína Plíšková. At the Malaysian Open, Vögele lost in the first round to sixth seed Kurumi Nara. Seeded 17th for qualifying at the Miami Open, Vögele qualified for the main draw by defeating Shahar Pe'er and Zhu Lin. In the first round, she beat Kirsten Flipkens 6–2, 6–2. In the second round, Vögele lost to 12th seed and eventual finalist Carla Suárez Navarro.

Vögele began her clay-court season at Charleston again with a first-round loss, to Yaroslava Shvedova. Seeded 16th for qualifying at the Madrid Open, she defeated wildcard Olga Sáez Larrabut in the final round, but lost to seventh seed Mirjana Lučić-Baroni. At the Nürnberger Versicherungscup, Vögele defeated qualifier Renata Voráčová in the first round; in the second round, she lost to seventh seed Kurumi Nara. At the French Open, she lost in the first round to Vitalia Diatchenko. At the $100k tournament in Marseille, Vögele lost in round one to Maryna Zanevska.

In the grass-court season, at the first edition of the Nottingham Open, she was beaten by Lučić-Baroni in the first round. At Birmingham, Vögele lost in the first round of qualifying to Çağla Büyükakçay. At Wimbledon, she lost in the first round to 21st seed Madison Keys, in three sets.

Vögele then played at the $100k tournament in Contrexéville and defeated Lara Michel in the first round and Jeļena Ostapenko in the second. In the quarterfinals, Vögele lost to Teliana Pereira. At the Bucharest Open, she lost in the first round to Anna Tatishvili. At the Gastein Ladies, she was defeated in the first round by Johanna Larsson, 6–2, 6–2. At the Baku Cup, Vögele lost in the first round to second seed Karin Knapp.

Seeded 28th for qualifying at the US Open, Vögele lost in the first round to Mandy Minella. Seeded sixth for qualifying at the Japan Open, Vögele lost in the first round to Hiroko Kuwata. Seeded seventh for qualifying at the Pan Pacific Open, Vögele defeated Junri Namigata but lost to Misa Eguchi. At the Tashkent Open, she qualified for the main draw by defeating wildcard Vlada Ekshibarova and eighth seed Ekaterina Bychkova. In the first round, she lost to fourth seed Johanna Larsson. At the Linz Open, Vögele qualified for the main draw by beating fifth seed Tereza Smitková, Donna Vekić, and fourth seed Jeļena Ostapenko. In the first round, she defeated wildcard Tamira Paszek. In the second round, Vögele lost to seventh seed and eventual champion Anastasia Pavlyuchenkova, 4–6, 0–6. At the Luxembourg Open, Vögele was given a wildcard. In the first round, she defeated Urszula Radwańska who retired due to a low back injury. In the second round, she beat Anna-Lena Friedsam. In the quarterfinals, she defeated lucky loser Laura Siegemund, 6–4, 2–6, 6–1. In the semifinals, Vögele lost to Mona Barthel. After Luxembourg, Vögele played at the $100k tournament in Poitiers and defeated Amandine Hesse in the first round 6–0, 6–3 and Kirsten Flipkens in the second. In the quarterfinals, she lost to Pauline Parmentier.

At Limoges, Vögele lost in the first round to lucky loser Mandy Minella. Seeded seventh at the Taipei Challenger, she defeated Lee Ya-hsuan in the first round. In the second round, she beat Maria Sakkari 6–1, 6–1. In the quarterfinals, she lost to fourth seed and eventual champion Tímea Babos. At the $75k+H event in Toyota, Vögele defeated Ankita Raina in the first round 6–1, 6–4 and lost in the second to Luksika Kumkhum, 2–6, 3–6.

Her final tournament of the year was the $25k tournament in Bangkok. She defeated Kyoka Okamura, 6–1, 6–4, before she lost to Ran Tian in the second round.

Vögele ended the year ranked 122.

=== 2016 ===
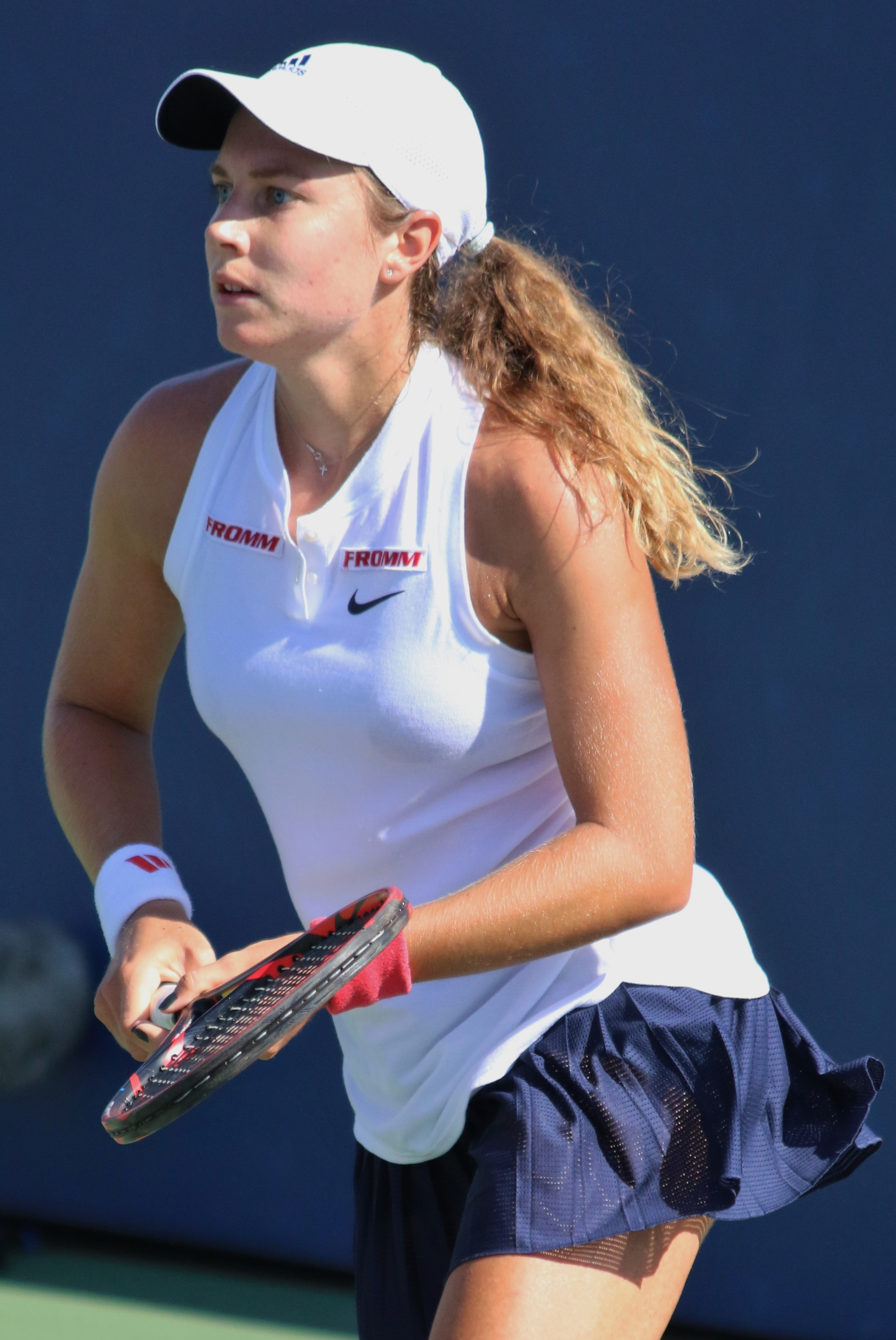
Vögele at the 2016 US Open

Vögele began the year at the Shenzhen Open where she lost in the final round of qualifying to eighth seed Zhang Kailin. However, due to Magda Linette pulling out of the tournament because of gastrointestinal illness, Vögele entered the main draw as a lucky loser. She was defeated in the first round by Vania King. In Sydney, Vögele lost in the first round of qualifying to Lauren Davis. At the Australian Open, she was defeated in the second round of qualifying by Luksika Kumkhum.

Seeded second at the Engie Open, Vögele won the tournament beating An-Sophie Mestach in the final. Competing at the first edition of the Taiwan Open, Vögele made it to the quarterfinal round where she retired against third seed Yulia Putintseva due to dizziness. At the Qatar Open, Vögele lost in the final round of qualifying to Kirsten Flipkens. At the Malaysian Open, Vögele was defeated in the first round by Kristína Kučová. She fell in the first round of qualifying at the Miami Open to Lourdes Domínguez Lino. Seeded fourth at the Open de Seine-et-Marne, Vögele reached the quarterfinal round where she lost to eighth seed Océane Dodin. Playing in Poland at the Katowice Open, Vögele upset sixth seed Lesia Tsurenko in the first round. She was defeated in the second round by Magda Linette.

Beginning her clay-court season in Turkey at the İstanbul Cup, Vögele reached her first semifinal of the year where she lost to eventual champion Çağla Büyükakçay. At the Prague Open, she was defeated in the first round by third seed and defending champion Karolína Plíšková. Seeded fifth at the Open de Cagnes-sur-Mer, Vögele lost in the quarterfinal round to fourth seed and eventual champion Magda Linette. At the French Open, Vögele was defeated in the second round of qualifying by Barbara Haas.

In Croatia at the Bol Open, Vögele made it to the quarterfinal round where she lost to fourth seed Nao Hibino.

Starting her grass-court season at the Rosmalen Open, Vögele was defeated in the first round by Nao Hibino. At the first edition of the Mallorca Open, she lost in her first-round match to eventual champion Anastasija Sevastova. At the Wimbledon Championships, Vögele was defeated in the first round by 22nd seed and former world No. 1, Jelena Janković.

Seeded third at the Lorraine Open, Vögele retired during her first-round match against Laura Pous Tió. Playing at the Ladies Championship Gstaad, she lost in the first round to Carina Witthöft. At the Swedish Open, Vögele was defeated in the final round of qualifying by Sara Sorribes Tormo.

In Connecticut at the Connecticut Open, she lost in the first round of qualifying to American wildcard Danielle Collins. At the final Grand Slam tournament of the year, the US Open, she was defeated in the first round by Kurumi Nara.

At the Korea Open, Vögele lost her first-round match to Bethanie Mattek-Sands. Vögele reached her fourth WTA quarterfinal of the year at the Tashkent Open where she was defeated by Kateryna Kozlova. At the Generali Ladies Linz, Vögele lost in the final round of qualifying to Océane Dodin. Playing at the Luxembourg Open, Vögele retired during her first round of qualifying match to Elise Mertens. Seeded eighth at the Internationaux de la Vienne, she was defeated in the first round by Isabella Shinikova. Vögele's final tournament of the season was at the Open de Limoges. Seeded eighth, she made it to the quarterfinal round where she lost to second seed Alizé Cornet.

Vögele ended the year ranked 113.

=== 2017–18 ===
Vögele kicked off her 2017 season at the Shenzhen Open. Coming through qualifying, she lost in the first round to fellow qualifier Ons Jabeur. Getting past qualifying at the Australian Open, Vögele won her first round match over Kurumi Nara. She was defeated in the second round by 13th seed and seven-time Grand Slam champion, Venus Williams.

She reached the final at the 2018 Abierto Mexicano, losing to seventh seed and defending champion Lesia Tsurenko in three sets.

=== 2019 ===
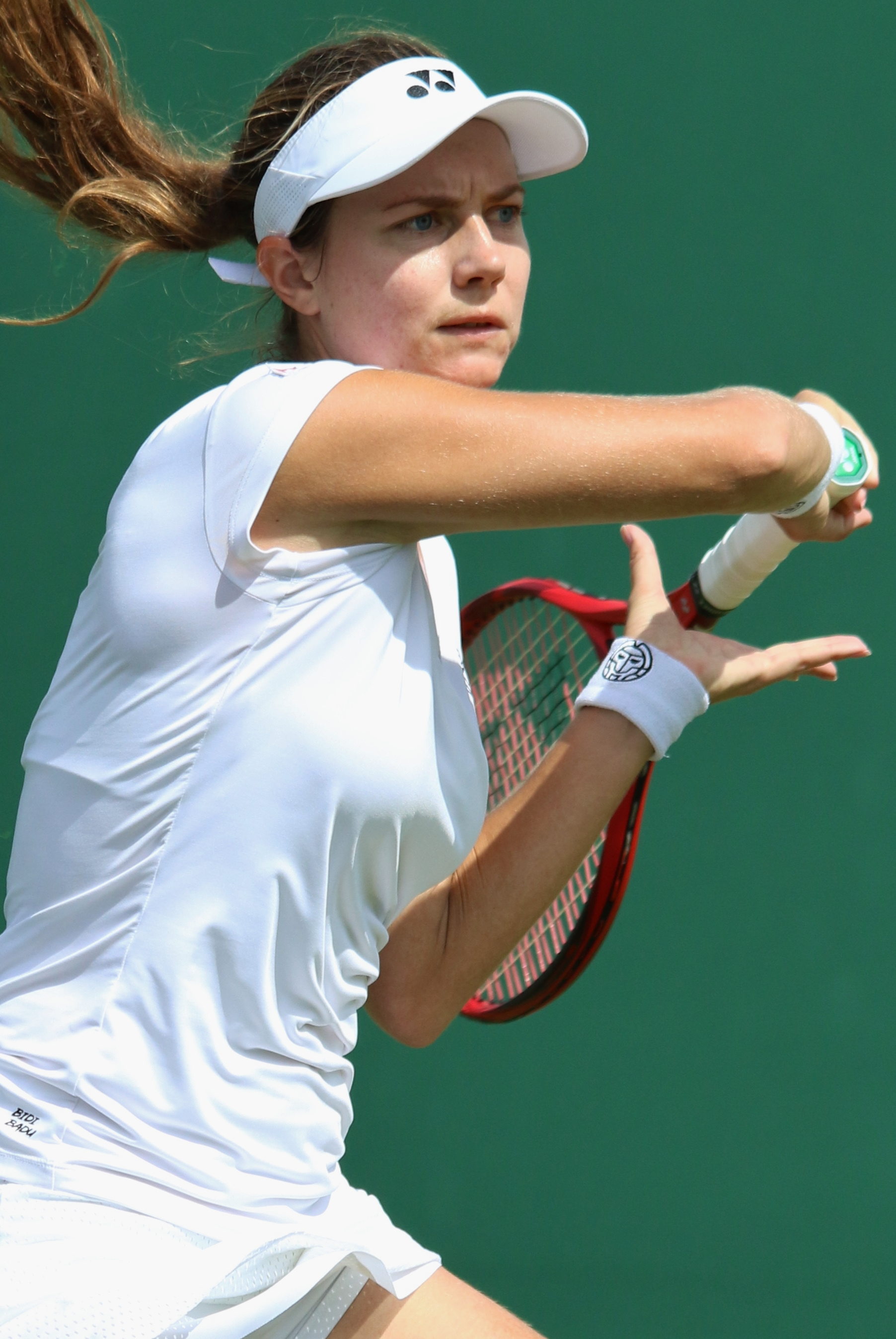
Voegele at Wimbledon, 2019

Vögele started her year at Auckland where she lost in the first round to Sara Sorribes Tormo. In Sydney, she was defeated in the first round of qualifying by Ekaterina Alexandrova. At the Australian Open, she lost in the first round to 28th seed Hsieh Su-wei.

Vögele played at the Thailand Open where she was defeated in the first round by sixth seed and eventual finalist Ajla Tomljanović. Despite losing in the final round of qualifying at the Dubai Championships, she made it into the main draw as a lucky loser. She was defeated in the second round by compatriot and eventual champion, Belinda Bencic. Making it past qualifying at the Indian Wells Open, she stunned fourth seed, Sloane Stephens, in the second round. She lost in the third round to eventual champion Bianca Andreescu. At the Miami Open, she was defeated in the first round of qualifying by Tímea Babos. She lost in the second round at the Monterrey Open to eighth seed Magdaléna Rybáriková.

Playing in her country at the Ladies Open Lugano, Vögele reached the quarterfinals where she was defeated by Fiona Ferro. At the Prague Open, she lost in the first round to Jana Čepelová. Seeded third at the Open de Cagnes-sur-Mer, she made it to the final where she was defeated by Christina McHale. Seeded third at the Solgironès Open Catalunya, she lost in the second round to qualifier Marta Kostyuk. At the French Open, she was defeated in the first round of qualifying by Xu Shilin.

Vögele lost in the second round of the Bol Open to top seed, defending champion, and eventual champion Tamara Zidanšek. As the top seed at the Torneo Internazionale Antico Tiro a Volo in Rome, she was defeated in the first round by Italian Jessica Pieri.

Playing one grass-court tournament before Wimbledon in Eastbourne, Vögele lost in the first round of qualifying to Jessica Pegula. At Wimbledon, she was defeated in the first round by two-time quarterfinalist Kaia Kanepi.

Seeded second and defending champion at the Contrexéville Open, Vögele reached the semifinals where she lost to Katarina Zavatska. At the Ladies Open Lausanne, she was defeated in the first round by fourth seed Mihaela Buzărnescu.

=== 2020 ===
Vögele kicked off 2020 at the Shenzhen Open. She lost in the first round of qualifying to Irina-Camelia Begu. At the Australian Open, she was defeated in the final round of qualifying by Monica Niculescu.

Seeded sixth at the Newport Beach Challenger, she reached the final where she lost to fifth seed Madison Brengle. At the Mexican Open, she was defeated in the first round of qualifying by Sara Errani. She remained in Mexico to compete at the Monterrey Open. Coming through qualifying, she lost in the first round to Leylah Fernandez.

Due to the COVID-19 pandemic, the WTA suspended tournaments from the end of March to July.

When WTA Tour resumed in August, Vögele competed at the Cincinnati Open. She was defeated in the first round of qualifying by Arantxa Rus. At the US Open, she lost her first-round match to 15th seed Maria Sakkari.

Vögele played two tournaments before the French Open. She was defeated in the first round of the İstanbul Cup by Jasmine Paolini. In Rome, she lost in the final round of qualifying to Anna Blinkova. At the French Open, she fell in the first round to Patricia Maria Țig.

At the first edition of the Ostrava Open, Vögele was defeated in the first round of qualifying by Veronika Kudermetova. She played her final tournament of the year at the Ladies Linz. Getting past qualifying, she made it to the second round where she lost to top seed and eventual champion, Aryna Sabalenka.

Vögele ended the year ranked 116.

=== 2021 ===
Vögele started her 2021 season at the Open Andrézieux-Bouthéon. Seeded third, she lost in the second round to Laura Ioana Paar. At the Australian Open, she was defeated in the first round of qualifying by Katharina Gerlach.

In March, Vögele competed at the Lyon Open. She was eliminated in the second round by seventh seed Paula Badosa. At the St. Petersburg Trophy, she was beaten in the first round by Tereza Martincová.

Vögele began her clay-court season in April at the Copa Colsanitas. She reached the quarterfinals where she fell to eventual champion Camila Osorio. At the first edition of the MUSC Health Women's Open, she lost in the first round to top seed and eventual finalist, Ons Jabeur. Coming through qualifying in Stuttgart, she was defeated in the first round by Jeļena Ostapenko. She was eliminated in the final round of qualifying at the Madrid Open by Irina-Camelia Begu. At the Open de Saint-Malo, she was defeated in her first-round match by seventh seed Nina Stojanović. Seeded sixth at the Solgironès Open Catalunya, she lost in the first round to Victoria Jiménez Kasintseva. At the first edition of the Emilia-Romagna Open, she reached the final round of qualifying where she was beaten by Paula Ormaechea. Making it through qualifying at the French Open, she lost in the first round to Jasmine Paolini.

In Berlin, Vögele made it to the final round of qualifying where she fell to Asia Muhammad. At Wimbledon, she was defeated in the first round of qualifying by Muhammad.

Seeded third at Contrexéville, Vögele was eliminated in the first round by French qualifier Léolia Jeanjean. In Lausanne, she was beaten in the second round by Maryna Zanevska. In August, she competed at the US Open where she lost in the final round of qualifying to Ana Konjuh. However, due to Jennifer Brady pulling out of the tournament due to injury, Vögele entered the main draw as a lucky loser. She was eliminated in the first round by fellow qualifier and eventual champion, Emma Raducanu.

Vögele played at the Luxembourg Open where she fell in her first-round match to fourth seed Ekaterina Alexandrova.

== Performance timelines ==
Key
W	F	SF	QF	#R	RR	Q#	P#	DNQ	A	Z#	PO	G	S	B	NMS	NTI	P	NH

(W) winner; (F) finalist; (SF) semifinalist; (QF) quarterfinalist; (#R) rounds 4, 3, 2, 1; (RR) round-robin stage; (Q#) qualification round; (P#) preliminary round; (DNQ) did not qualify; (A) absent; (Z#) Davis/Fed Cup Zonal Group (with number indication) or (PO) play-off; (G) gold, (S) silver or (B) bronze Olympic/Paralympic medal; (NMS) not a Masters tournament; (NTI) not a Tier I tournament; (P) postponed; (NH) not held; (SR) strike rate (events won / competed); (W–L) win–loss record.
To avoid confusion and double counting, these charts are updated at the conclusion of a tournament or when the player's participation has ended.

Only main-draw results in WTA Tour, Grand Slam tournaments, Fed Cup/Billie Jean King Cup and Olympic Games are included in win–loss records.

=== Singles ===
Tournament	2005	2006	2007	2008	2009	2010	2011	2012	2013	2014	2015	2016	2017	2018	2019	2020	2021	2022	SR	W–L	Win%
Grand Slam tournaments
Australian Open	A	A	A	Q1	Q3	2R	Q1	1R	1R	2R	2R	Q2	2R	Q3	1R	Q3	Q1	1R	0 / 8	4–8	33%
French Open	A	A	A	Q2	Q2	1R	Q3	Q2	3R	2R	1R	Q2	A	1R	Q1	1R	1R	Q1	0 / 7	3–7	30%
Wimbledon	A	A	A	Q1	1R	1R	Q1	Q2	1R	1R	1R	1R	A	1R	1R	NH	Q1	Q1	0 / 8	0–8	0%
US Open	A	A	A	1R	2R	1R	Q2	1R	1R	1R	Q1	1R	Q2	1R	Q1	1R	1R	Q1	0 / 10	1–10	9%
Win–loss	0–0	0–0	0–0	0–1	1–2	1–4	0–0	0–2	2–4	2–4	1–3	0–2	1–1	0–3	0–2	0–2	0–2	0–1	0 / 33	8–33	20%
WTA 1000
Dubai / Qatar Open (Note: The first Premier 5 event of the year has switched back and forth between the Dubai Tennis Championships and the Qatar Ladies Open since 2009. Dubai was classified as a Premier 5 event from 2009 to 2011 before being succeeded by Doha for the 2012–2014 period. In 2015, Dubai regained its Premier 5 status while Doha was demoted to Premier status. The Premier 5 tournaments were reclassified as WTA 1000 tournaments in 2021.)	NMS			A	1R	2R	A	A	A	2R	Q1	Q2	A	A	2R	A	A	1R	0 / 5	3–5	38%
Indian Wells Open	A	A	A	A	Q1	1R	A	A	2R	1R	A	A	A	A	3R	NH	A	A	0 / 4	3–4	43%
Miami Open	A	A	A	A	Q2	1R	A	Q1	2R	1R	2R	Q1	A	1R	Q1	NH	A	2R	0 / 6	2–6	25%
Madrid Open	NH				A	1R	A	A	1R	1R	Q2	A	A	A	A	NH	Q2	A	0 / 3	0–3	0%
Italian Open	A	A	A	A	A	A	A	A	Q1	Q2	A	A	A	A	A	Q2	A	A	0 / 0	0–0	–
Canadian Open	A	A	A	A	Q1	A	A	A	A	A	A	A	A	Q1	A	NH	A	A	0 / 0	0–0	–
Cincinnati Open	NMS				A	A	A	A	Q1	A	A	A	A	1R	A	Q1	A	A	0 / 1	0–1	0%
Pan Pacific / Wuhan Open (Note: In 2014, the Pan Pacific Open was downgraded to a Premier event and replaced by the Wuhan Open. The Premier 5 tournaments were reclassified as WTA 1000 tournaments in 2021.)	A	A	A	A	A	A	A	A	1R	1R	A	A	A	A	A	NH			0 / 2	0–2	0%
China Open	NMS				A	A	A	A	1R	Q2	A	A	A	A	A	NH			0 / 1	0–1	0%
Mexican Open	NMS/NH																		0 / 0	0–0	–
Career statistics
Tournaments	0	0	0	2	9	22	1	7	20	23	17	13	4	17	15	5	12	4	Career total: 171		
Titles	0	0	0	0	0	0	0	0	0	0	0	0	0	0	0	0	0	0	Career total: 0		
Finals	0	0	0	0	0	0	0	0	0	0	0	0	0	1	0	0	0	0	Career total: 1		
Overall win–loss	0–1	0–1	0–0	0–2	10–9	9–22	1–1	3–8	22–23	13–24	7–17	8–13	5–4	9–17	6–15	1–5	4–12	1–4	0 / 171	99–178	36%
Year-end ranking	N/A	920	215	130	76	127	138	113	44	78	122	114	152	85	119	116	147	240	$3,108,188		

=== Doubles ===
Tournament	2009	2010	2013	2014	2015	...	2019	...	2022	SR	W–L
Australian Open	A	A	1R	2R	1R		A		A	0 / 3	1–3
French Open	A	2R	1R	2R	A		A		A	0 / 3	2–3
Wimbledon	A	A	1R	3R	1R		1R		A	0 / 4	2–4
US Open	2R	1R	1R	1R	A		A		A	0 / 4	1–4
Win–loss	1–1	1–2	0–4	4–4	0–2		0–1		0–0	0 / 14	6–14

== WTA Tour finals ==
=== Singles: 1 (runner-up) ===
Legend WTA 250 (0–1)	Finals by surface Hard (0–1)

Result	Date	Tournament	Tier	Surface	Opponents	Score
Loss	Mar 2018	Mexican Open	International (Note: The WTA International tournaments were reclassified as WTA 250 tournaments in 2021.)	Hard	(Ukraine) Lesia Tsurenko	7–5, 6–7^{(5–7)}, 2–6

=== Doubles: 1 (runner-up) ===
Legend WTA 500 WTA 250 (0–1)	Finals by surface Hard (0–0) Clay (0–1)

Result	Date	Tournament	Tier	Surface	Partner	Opponents	Score
Loss	Feb 2012	Copa Colsanitas, Colombia	International	Clay	(Luxembourg) Mandy Minella	(Czech Republic) Eva Birnerová (Russia) Alexandra Panova	2–6, 2–6

== WTA Challenger finals ==
=== Singles: 1 (runner-up) ===
Result	Date	Tournament	Surface	Opponent	Score
Loss	Jan 2020	Newport Beach Challenger, United States	Hard	(United States) Madison Brengle	1–6, 6–3, 2–6

== ITF Circuit finals ==
=== Singles: 16 (8 titles, 8 runner-ups) ===
Legend $100,000 tournaments $75/80,000 tournaments $50,000 tournaments $25,000 tournaments $10,000 tournaments	Finals by surface Hard (5–3) Clay (2–3) Grass (0–1) Carpet (1–1)

Result	W–L	Date	Tournament	Tier	Surface	Opponent	Score
Win	1–0	Dec 2006	ITF Tel Aviv, Israel	10,000	Hard	(Netherlands) Marlot Meddens	6–3, 6–4
Loss	1–1	Feb 2007	ITF Belfort, France	25,000	Carpet (i)	(France) Virginie Pichet	6–2, 0–6, 2–6
Loss	1–2	Mar 2007	ITF Mumbai, India	25,000	Hard	(Uzbekistan) Akgul Amanmuradova	0–6, 5–7
Win	2–2	Mar 2007	ITF Hyderabad, India	10,000	Hard	(United States) Amber Liu	5–7, 7–5, 6–3
Win	3–2	Jul 2007	Bella Cup, Poland	25,000	Clay	(Romania) Alexandra Dulgheru	6–2, 4–6, 7–5
Loss	3–3	Jul 2007	ITF Dnipropetrovsk, Ukraine	50,000	Clay	(France) Alizé Cornet	4–6, 3–6
Loss	3–4	Nov 2008	Open Nantes Atlantique, France	50,000	Hard	(Serbia) Vesna Dolonc	3–6, 2–6
Loss	3–5	May 2009	Open Romania Ladies	100,000	Clay	(Germany) Andrea Petkovic	3–6, 2–6
Loss	3–6	Jun 2009	Nottingham Trophy, UK	50,000	Grass	(Italy) Maria Elena Camerin	2–6, 6–4, 1–6
Win	4–6	Mar 2011	GB Pro-Series Bath, UK	25,000	Hard (i)	(Poland) Marta Domachowska	6–7^{(3–7)}, 7–5, 6–2
Loss	4–7	Sep 2012	GB Pro-Series Shrewsbury, UK	75,000	Hard (i)	(Germany) Annika Beck	2–6, 4–6
Win	5–7	Sep 2012	ITF Clermont-Ferrand, France	25,000	Hard (i)	(Germany) Tatjana Maria	6–4, 6–1
Win	6–7	Nov 2012	Toyota World Challenge, Japan	75,000	Carpet (i)	(Japan) Kimiko Date-Krumm	7–6^{(9–7)}, 6–4
Win	7–7	Jan 2016	Open Andrézieux-Bouthéon, France	50,000	Hard (i)	(Belgium) An-Sophie Mestach	6–1, 6–2
Win	8–7	Jul 2018	Open Contrexéville, France	100,000	Clay	(Spain) Sara Sorribes Tormo	6–4, 6–2
Loss	8–8	May 2019	Open de Cagnes-sur-Mer, France	80,000	Clay	(United States) Christina McHale	6–7^{(4–7)}, 2–6

=== Doubles: 11 (5 titles, 6 runner-ups) ===
Legend $100,000 tournaments $75,000 tournaments $50,000 tournaments $25,000 tournaments $10,000 tournaments	Finals by surface Hard (2–2) Clay (2–4) Carpet (1–0)

Result	W–L	Date	Tournament	Tier	Surface	Partner	Opponents	Score
Loss	0–1	Sep 2006	ITF Thessaloniki, Greece	10,000	Clay	(Switzerland) Amra Sadiković	(Italy) Nicole Clerico (Russia) Alexandra Panova	4–6, 6–7^{(6–8)}
Loss	0–2	Mar 2007	ITF Mumbai, India	25,000	Hard	(Russia) Olga Panova	(Uzbekistan) Akgul Amanmuradova (Russia) Nina Bratchikova	2–6, 3–6
Win	1–2	Jul 2007	Bella Cup, Poland	25,000	Clay	(Bosnia and Herzegovina) Sandra Martinović	(Poland) Magdalena Kiszczyńska (Poland) Natalia Kołat	2–6, 6–4, 6–3
Win	2–2	Mar 2008	ITF La Palma, Spain	25,000	Hard	(Ukraine) Yuliya Beygelzimer	(Spain) Estrella Cabeza Candela (Spain) Sílvia Soler Espinosa	7–5, 7–6^{(7–5)}
Win	3–2	Apr 2008	ITF Hamburg, Germany	25,000	Carpet (i)	(Ukraine) Yuliya Beygelzimer	(Czech Republic) Veronika Chvojková (Czech Republic) Andrea Hlaváčková	7–6^{(7–3)}, 6–2
Loss	3–3	May 2008	ITF Jounieh Open, Lebanon	50,000	Clay	(Slovakia) Kristína Kučová	(Russia) Nina Bratchikova (Ukraine) Veronika Kapshay	5–7, 6–3, [6–10]
Loss	3–4	Jul 2008	Zagreb Ladies Open, Croatia	75,000	Clay	(Ukraine) Yuliya Beygelzimer	(Estonia) Maret Ani (Croatia) Jelena Kostanić Tošić	4–6, 2–6
Loss	3–5	Aug 2008	ITF Rimini, Italy	75,000	Clay	(Germany) Kathrin Wörle	(Italy) Mara Santangelo (Italy) Roberta Vinci	1–6, 4–6
Win	4–5	Jul 2011	Cuneo International, Italy	100,000	Clay	(Luxembourg) Mandy Minella	(Czech Republic) Eva Birnerová (Russia) Vesna Dolonc	6–3, 6–2
Win	5–5	Sep 2012	GB Pro-Series Shrewsbury, UK	75,000	Hard	(Serbia) Vesna Dolonc	(Czech Republic) Karolína Plíšková (Czech Republic) Kristýna Plíšková	6–1, 6–7^{(3–7)}, [15–13]
Loss	5–6	Oct 2012	Open de Limoges, France	50,000	Hard (i)	(France) Irena Pavlovic	(Poland) Magda Linette (Poland) Sandra Zaniewska	1–6, 7–5, [5–10]

== Top 10 wins ==
Season	2013	2019	Total
Wins	1	1	2

#	Player	Rank	Event	Surface	Rd	Score	SVR
2013
1.	(Denmark) Caroline Wozniacki	No. 10	Charleston Open, US	Clay	QF	3–6, 6–4, 6–3	No. 131
2019
2.	(United States) Sloane Stephens	No. 4	Indian Wells Open, US	Hard	2R	6–3, 6–0	No. 109
