= Annika Beck =

German tennis player (born 1994)

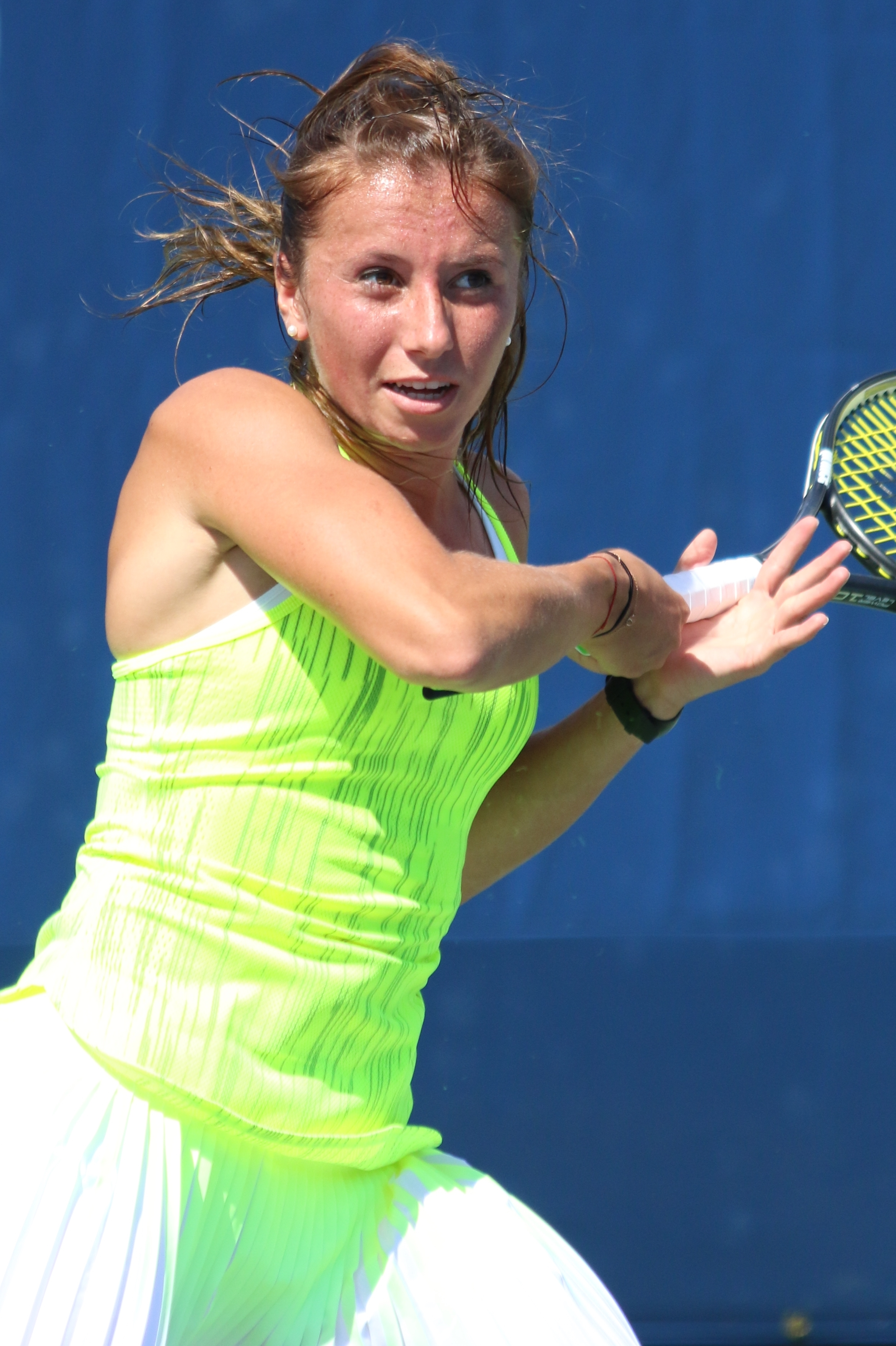
- Beck at the 2016 US Open
- Country (sports): Germany
- Born: 16 February 1994 (age 32) Gießen, Germany
- Height: 1.70 m (5 ft 7 in)
- Turned pro: 2009
- Retired: 21 October 2018
- Plays: Right (two-handed backhand)
- Prize money: $2,254,932

Singles
- Career record: 251–189
- Career titles: 2 WTA, 7 ITF
- Highest ranking: No. 37 (18 July 2016)

Grand Slam singles results
- Australian Open: 4R (2016)
- French Open: 3R (2015, 2016)
- Wimbledon: 3R (2016)
- US Open: 2R (2016)

Doubles
- Career record: 28–61
- Career titles: 1 WTA
- Highest ranking: No. 84 (18 July 2016)

Grand Slam doubles results
- Australian Open: 2R (2014, 2017)
- French Open: 2R (2014, 2015)
- Wimbledon: 2R (2016)
- US Open: 1R (2013, 2014, 2015, 2016)

Team competitions
- Fed Cup: 2–1

Annika Beck (German pronunciation: [bɛk]; born 16 February 1994) is a German former professional tennis player. She started playing tennis at the age of four when introduced to the game by her parents. A baseliner whose favorite shot is forehand, and favorite surface is hardcourt. She was coached by Jakub Záhlava and Sebastian Sachs.

Beck won two singles titles and one doubles title on the WTA Tour, as well as seven singles titles on the ITF Women's Circuit. On 18 July 2016, she reached her best singles ranking of world No. 37, and on the same date, she peaked at No. 84 in the WTA doubles rankings.

== Early life ==
Her father Johannes and her mother Petra teach chemistry at the University of Bonn. Beck attended the Erzbischöfliche Liebfrauenschule Bonn, a school for girls, where she completed her Abitur in 2011.

== Career ==
=== 2012 ===
Beck started 2012 ranked world No. 234. She played one ITF tournament in January, one in February, and three in March, where she was runner-up in Sunderland and Bath, and won in Moscow. In April and May, Beck played higher-level tournaments, but had to play qualifying rounds. She qualified for the main draw in Copenhagen and Prague, achieving the second round of the main draw at the latter. She lost in qualifying at the events in Stuttgart and Estoril, and at the French Open. She did, however, take part in the Junior French Open, defeating Anna Karolína Schmiedlová in the final, in three sets.

Beck qualified for the Wimbledon Championships, but lost in the first round. In July, she earned a spot in the main draw of the WTA Tour event in Båstad but did not progress past the first round. She also played two ITF tournaments, winning the $50k event in Versmold, and losing in the second round at the $100k event in Olomouc. In August, she won a $25k tournament in Koksijde, then played in qualifying for the US Open, losing in the first round.

In September, her rank had risen enough for direct entry into the main draw at the Bell Challenge in Quebec City, where she got to the second round. She then won the GB Pro-Series Shrewsbury on the ITF Circuit. In October, she played two WTA events, but had to play qualifying rounds. She lost in the second round of qualifying at the Linz Open, but won through to the main draw at the Luxembourg Open, winning her first-round match but losing to Lucie Hradecká in the second. Back on the ITF Circuit, she won the two $75k events in Ismaning and Barnstaple. By the end of 2012, she had improved her world ranking 156 places up to No. 78.

=== 2013 ===
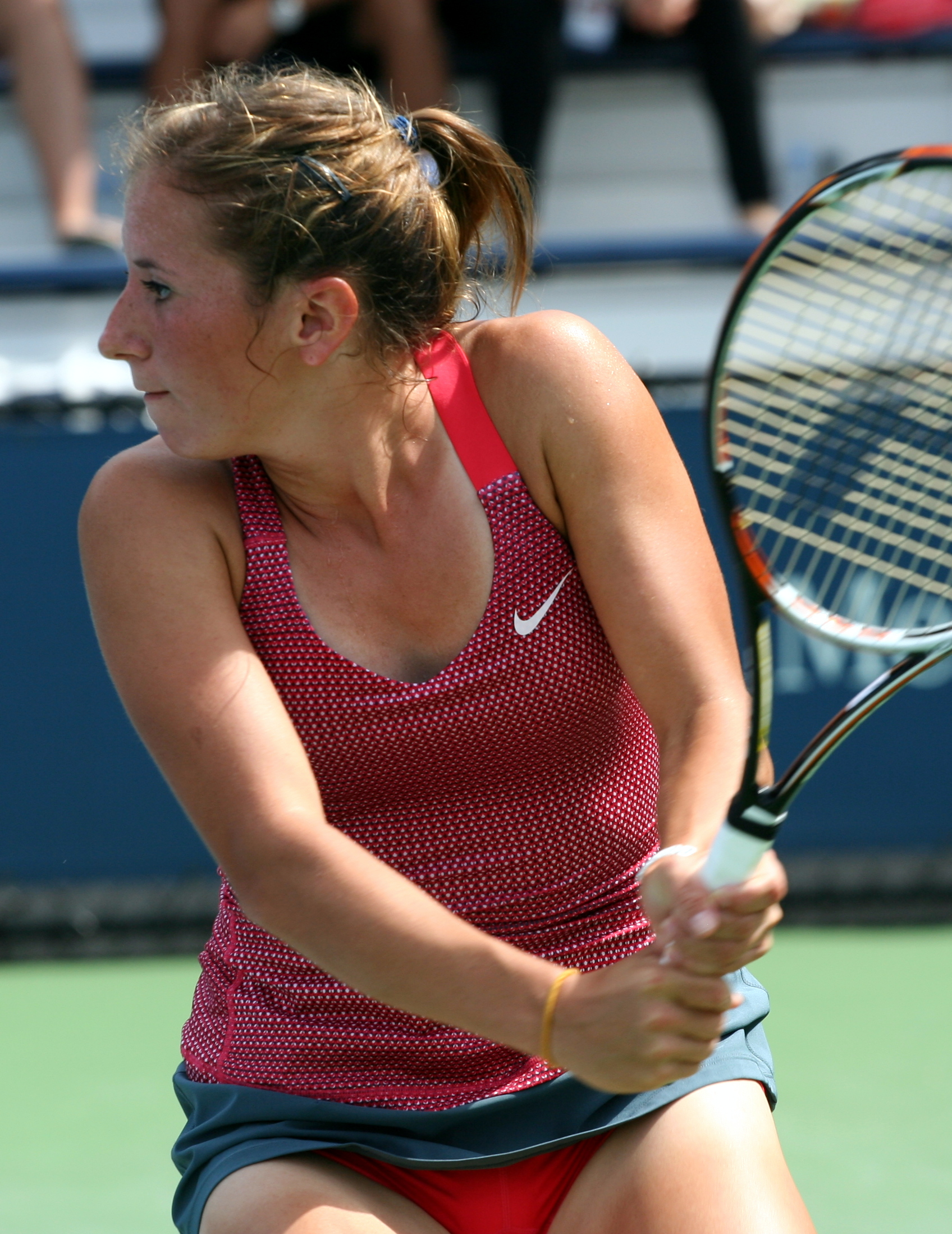
Beck at the 2013 US Open

Beck began her 2013 season at the first edition of the Shenzhen Open. She reached the quarterfinal round where she lost to sixth seed Peng Shuai. Beck then went on to win her first Grand Slam match at the Australian Open, upsetting 28th seed Yaroslava Shvedova in the first round. She was defeated in the second round by Ayumi Morita.

In Thailand at the Pattaya Open, she lost in the first round to Varatchaya Wongteanchai. Also at the U.S. Indoor Championships in Tennessee, Beck was defeated in the first round, by eventual champion Marina Erakovic. Seeded eighth at the Brasil Tennis Cup, she lost in the second round to Jana Čepelová. In Indian Wells, Beck was defeated in the first round by Kiki Bertens. At the Sony Open, Beck lost in the first round to Urszula Radwańska.

Beck began clay-court season at the first edition of the Katowice Open. She made it to the semifinal round where she was defeated by second seed and eventual champion, Roberta Vinci. In Stuttgart at the Porsche Tennis Grand Prix, Beck pushed fifth seed Petra Kvitová to three sets but ended up losing in their first round encounter. At the Portugal Open, Beck was defeated in the first round of qualifying by Vania King.

=== 2014: First WTA Tour title ===
Beck improved her previous year's result at the Shenzhen Open, this time reaching the semifinals, where she lost to Li Na, in straight sets. At the Australian Open, she defeated Petra Martić in the first round, but lost to 14th seed Ana Ivanovic in the second. At the French Open, she lost in the first round to Tsvetana Pironkova, in three sets.

In October, Beck won her first career title by defeating Barbora Záhlavová-Strýcová in the Luxembourg Open final.

=== 2015 ===
At the French Open, Beck defeated former world No. 2, Agnieszka Radwańska, in the first round in three sets, becoming just the third player to defeat the Pole in the first round of a Grand Slam tournament. In round two, she defeated another Pole in the person of qualifier Paula Kania to reach the third round of a Grand Slam tournament for the first time. After early exits at Wimbledon and the US Open and her first WTA doubles title, Beck won her second WTA singles title at the Tournoi de Québec by beating Jeļena Ostapenko (who had defeated her in their last meeting) in straight sets.

=== 2016 ===
After early exits at the Shenzhen Open and the Hobart International, Beck reached the second week of a Grand Slam championship for the first time at the Australian Open, beating wildcard Priscilla Hon, No. 11 seed Timea Bacsinszky and Laura Siegemund en route. She then lost to eventual champion Angelique Kerber in straight sets. After that, Beck played for Germany in their Fed Cup tie against Switzerland where she beat Bacsinszky once again. However, the win was not enough for them as Germany lost in the doubles match.

=== 2017 ===
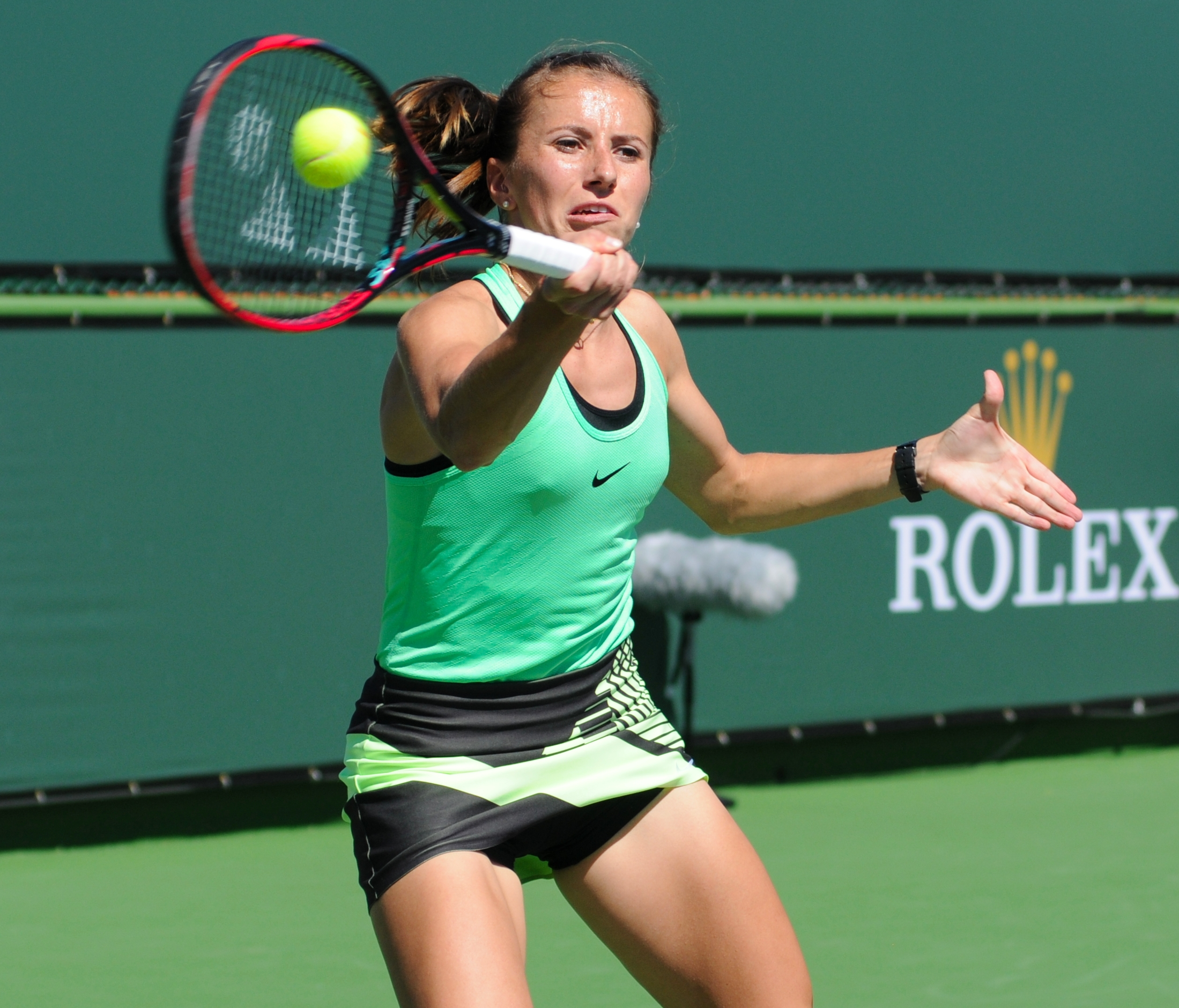
Beck at the 2017 Indian Wells Open

Beck's season started in January at the Auckland Open. She lost in the first round to Naomi Osaka. In Hobart at the Hobart International, Beck was defeated in the first round by top seed Kiki Bertens. At the Australian Open, Beck lost in the first round to Australian wildcard Ashleigh Barty.

In Russia at the St. Petersburg Ladies' Trophy, Beck upset seventh seed Kiki Bertens in the first round. She was defeated in the second round by eventual finalist Yulia Putintseva. At the Qatar Open, Beck lost in the final round of qualifying to Camila Giorgi. Seeded eighth at the Hungarian Open, Beck reached the quarterfinal round where she fell to Carina Witthöft. At the Abierto Mexicano Telcel, Beck was defeated in the first round by Madison Brengle. Playing at the Indian Wells Open, Beck beat former world No. 5, Eugenie Bouchard, in the first round. She lost in the second round to 28th seed Kristina Mladenovic. At the Miami Open, Beck was defeated in the first round by Christina McHale.

Beginning clay-court season at the Charleston Open, she lost in the second round to fifth seed and 2011 champion, Caroline Wozniacki.

=== 2018 ===
On 21 October, Beck announced her retirement from professional tour.

== WTA Tour finals ==
=== Singles: 4 (2 titles, 2 runner-ups) ===
Legend Premier M & Premier 5 Premier International (2–2)	Finals by surface Hard (1–1) Clay (0–1) Carpet (1–0)

Result	W–L	Date	Tournament	Surface	Opponent	Score
Loss	0–1	Oct 2013	Luxembourg Open, Luxembourg	Hard (i)	(Denmark) Caroline Wozniacki	2–6, 2–6
Win	1–1	Oct 2014	Luxembourg Open, Luxembourg	Hard (i)	(Czech Republic) Barbora Strýcová	6–2, 6–1
Loss	1–2	Jul 2015	Brasil Tennis Cup, Brazil	Clay	(Brazil) Teliana Pereira	4–6, 6–4, 1–6
Win	2–2	Sep 2015	Tournoi de Québec, Canada	Carpet (i)	(Latvia) Jeļena Ostapenko	6–2, 6–2

=== Doubles: 3 (1 title, 2 runner-ups) ===
Legend Premier International (1–2)	Finals by surface Hard (0–1) Clay (1–1)

Result	W–L	Date	Tournament	Surface	Partner	Opponents	Score
Loss	0–1	Oct 2014	Ladies Linz, Austria	Hard (i)	(France) Caroline Garcia	(Romania) Raluca Olaru (United States) Anna Tatishvili	2–6, 1–6
Win	1–1	Jul 2015	Brasil Tennis Cup, Brazil	Clay	(Germany) Laura Siegemund	(Argentina) María Irigoyen (Poland) Paula Kania	6–3, 7–6^{(7–1)}
Loss	1–2	Jul 2016	Ladies Championship Gstaad, Switzerland	Clay	(Russia) Evgeniya Rodina	(Spain) Lara Arruabarrena (Switzerland) Xenia Knoll	1–6, 6–3, [8–10]

== ITF Circuit finals ==
=== Singles: 10 (7–3) ===
Legend $100,000 tournaments $75,000 tournaments $50,000 tournaments $25,000 tournaments $10,000 tournaments	Finals by surface Hard (4–3) Clay (2–0) Carpet (1–0)

Result	No.	Date	Tournament	Surface	Opponent	Score
Loss	1.	22 November 2009	ITF Équeurdreville, France	Hard (i)	(France) Constance Sibille	4–6, 2–6
Win	1.	31 January 2010	ITF Kaarst, Germany	Hard (i)	(France) Audrey Bergot	6–2, 7–5
Loss	2.	5 February 2012	ITF Sunderland, United Kingdom	Hard (i)	(Germany) Sarah Gronert	6–3, 2–6, 3–6
Win	2.	26 February 2012	ITF Moscow, Russia	Hard (i)	(Belgium) Kirsten Flipkens	6–1, 7–5
Loss	3.	25 March 2012	ITF Bath, United Kingdom	Hard (i)	(Netherlands) Kiki Bertens	4–6, 6–3, 3–6
Win	3.	8 July 2012	Versmold Open, Germany	Clay	(Latvia) Anastasija Sevastova	6–3, 6–1
Win	4.	12 August 2012	ITF Koksijde, Belgium	Clay	(Netherlands) Bibiane Schoofs	6–1, 6–1
Win	5.	22 September 2012	GB Pro-Series Shrewsbury, UK	Hard (i)	(Switzerland) Stefanie Vögele	6–2, 6–4
Win	6.	28 October 2012	Ismaning Open, Germany	Carpet (i)	(Czech Republic) Eva Birnerová	6–3, 7–6^{(8)}
Win	7.	4 November 2012	GB Pro-Series Barnstaple, UK	Hard (i)	(Greece) Eleni Daniilidou	6–7^{(1)}, 6–2, 6–2

== Junior Grand Slam final ==
=== Singles ===
Result	Year	Championship	Surface	Opponent	Score
Win	2012	French Open	Clay	(Slovakia) Anna Karolína Schmiedlová	3–6, 7–5, 6–3

== Grand Slam performance timelines ==
Key
W	F	SF	QF	#R	RR	Q#	DNQ	A	NH

(W) winner; (F) finalist; (SF) semifinalist; (QF) quarterfinalist; (#R) rounds 4, 3, 2, 1; (RR) round-robin stage; (Q#) qualification round; (DNQ) did not qualify; (A) absent; (NH) not held; (SR) strike rate (events won / competed); (W–L) win–loss record.

=== Singles ===
Tournament	2012	2013	2014	2015	2016	2017	W–L
Australian Open	A	2R	2R	1R	4R	1R	5–5
French Open	Q1	2R	1R	3R	3R	1R	5–5
Wimbledon	1R	2R	1R	1R	3R	1R	3–6
US Open	Q1	1R	1R	1R	2R	1R	1–5
Win–Loss	0–1	3–4	1–4	2–4	8–4	0–4	14–21

=== Doubles ===
Tournament	2013	2014	2015	2016	2017	W–L
Australian Open	1R	2R	1R	1R	2R	2–5
French Open	1R	2R	2R	1R	1R	2–5
Wimbledon	1R	1R	Q2	2R	A	1–3
US Open	1R	1R	1R	1R	A	0–4
Win–Loss	0–4	2–4	1–3	1–4	1–2	5–17

== Wins over top-10 players ==
Season	2012	2013	2014	2015	2016	2017	Total
Wins	0	0	1	0	0	0	1

#	Player	Rank	Event	Surface	Rd	Score	Beck rank
2014
1.	(Romania) Simona Halep	No. 3	Rosmalen Championships	Grass	2R	5–7, 3–2 ret.	No. 55
