= 2008 Fortis Championships Luxembourg =

- Date: 20–26 October
- Edition: 13th
- Category: Tier III Series
- Draw: 32S / 16D
- Prize money: $225,000
- Surface: Hard / indoor
- Location: Kockelscheuer, Luxembourg

Champions

Singles
- (Russia) Elena Dementieva

Doubles
- (Romania) Sorana Cîrstea / (New Zealand) Marina Erakovic
← 2007 ·	Fortis Championships Luxembourg	· 2009 →

The 2008 Fortis Championships Luxembourg was a women's tennis tournament on indoor hard courts. It was the 13th edition of the Fortis Championships Luxembourg, and was part of the Tier III Series of the 2008 WTA Tour. The tournament took place in Kockelscheuer, Luxembourg, from 20 October until 26 October 2008. First-seeded Elena Dementieva won the singles title and earned $35,000 first-prize money.

== Finals ==
=== Singles ===
(Russia) Elena Dementieva defeated (Denmark) Caroline Wozniacki 2–6, 6–4, 7–6^{(7–4)}

- It was Elena Dementieva's 3rd singles title of the year and the 11th of her career.

=== Doubles ===
(Romania) Sorana Cîrstea / (New Zealand) Marina Erakovic defeated (Russia) Vera Dushevina / (Ukraine) Mariya Koryttseva 2–6, 6–3, 10–8
