= 1996 SEAT Open =

Women's tennis tournament

- Date: 21–27 October
- Edition: 1st
- Category: Tier III
- Draw: 32S / 16D
- Prize money: $164,250
- Surface: Carpet / indoor
- Location: Kockelscheuer, Luxembourg

Champions

Singles
- (Germany) Anke Huber

Doubles
- (Netherlands) Kristie Boogert / (France) Nathalie Tauziat
SEAT Open	· 1997 →

The 1996 SEAT Open was a women's tennis tournament played on indoor carpet courts in Kockelscheuer, Luxembourg that was part of Tier III of the 1996 WTA Tour. It was the inaugural edition of the tournament and was held from 21 October until 27 October 1996. First-seeded Anke Huber won the singles title.

== Finals ==
=== Singles ===
(Germany) Anke Huber defeated (Slovakia) Karina Habšudová 6–3, 6–0

- It was Huber's 3rd title of the year and the 10th of her career.

=== Doubles ===
(Netherlands) Kristie Boogert / (France) Nathalie Tauziat defeated (Germany) Barbara Rittner / (Belgium) Dominique Van Roost 2–6, 6–4, 6–2

- It was Boogert's 3rd title of the year and the 3rd of her career. It was Tauziat's 2nd title of the year and the 15th of her career.
