= 1998 SEAT Open =

- Date: 26–31 October
- Edition: 3rd
- Category: Tier III
- Draw: 30S / 16D
- Prize money: $164,250
- Surface: Carpet / indoor
- Location: Kockelscheuer, Luxembourg

Champions

Singles
- (France) Mary Pierce

Doubles
- (Russia) Elena Likhovtseva / (Japan) Ai Sugiyama
← 1997 ·	SEAT Open	· 1999 →

The 1998 SEAT Open was a women's tennis tournament played on indoor carpet courts in Kockelscheuer, Luxembourg that was part of Tier III of the 1998 WTA Tour. It was the third edition of the tournament and was held from 26 October until 31 October 1998. Second-seeded Mary Pierce won the singles title and earned $27,000 first-prize money.

== Finals ==
=== Singles ===
(France) Mary Pierce defeated (Italy) Silvia Farina 6–0, 2–0 ret.

- It was Pierce's 6th title of the year and the 17th of her career.

=== Doubles ===
(Russia) Elena Likhovtseva / (Japan) Ai Sugiyama defeated (Latvia) Larisa Neiland / (Ukraine) Elena Tatarkova 6–7^{(3–7)}, 6–3, 2–0 (Neiland and Tatarkova retired)

- It was Likhovtseva's 2nd title of the year and the 4th of her career. It was Sugiyama's 4th title of the year and the 8th of her career.
