= List of national stadiums =

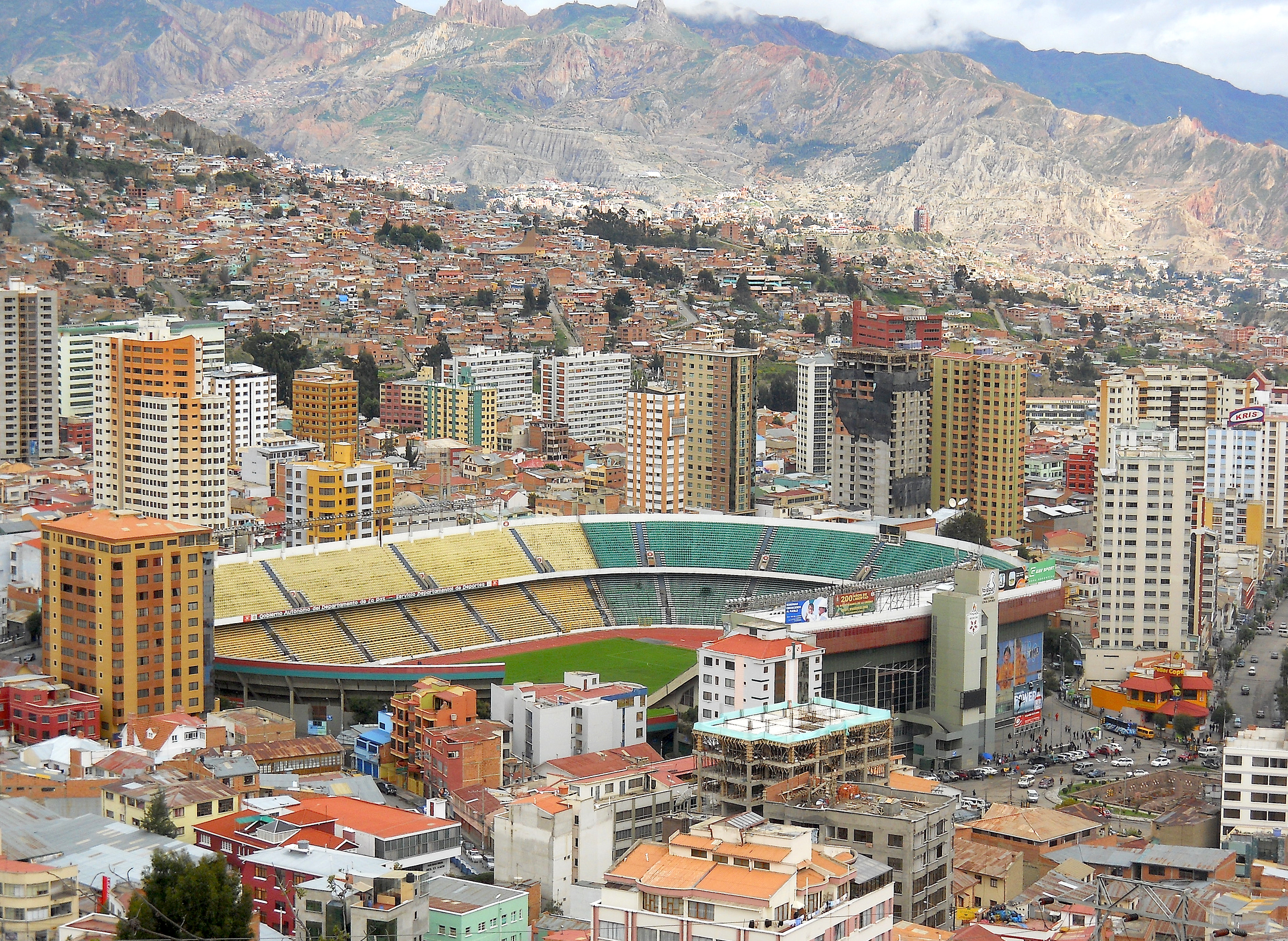
Estadio Hernando Siles in La Paz, Bolivia

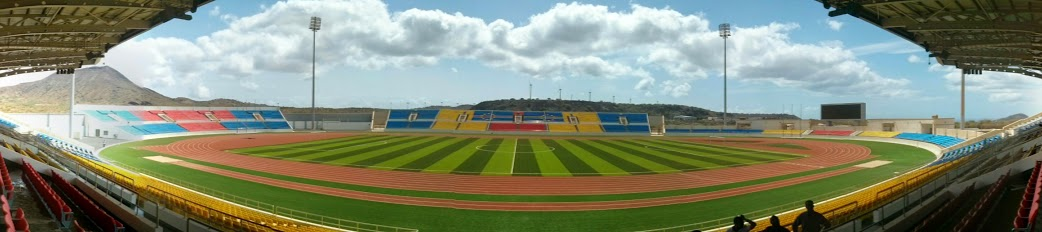
Estádio Nacional de Cabo Verde in Cape Verde

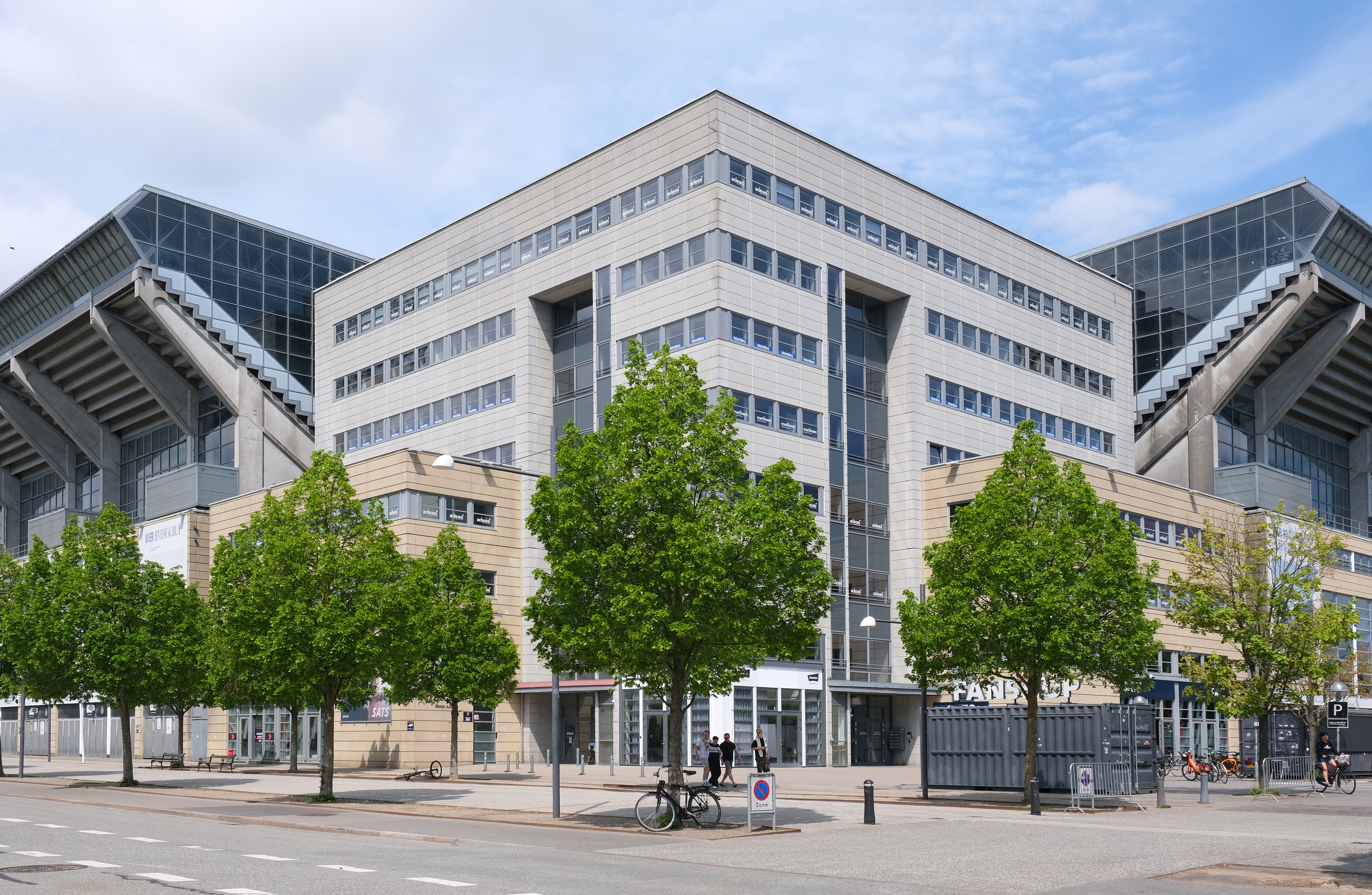
Parken in Denmark

Gelora Bung Karno Stadium in Indonesia

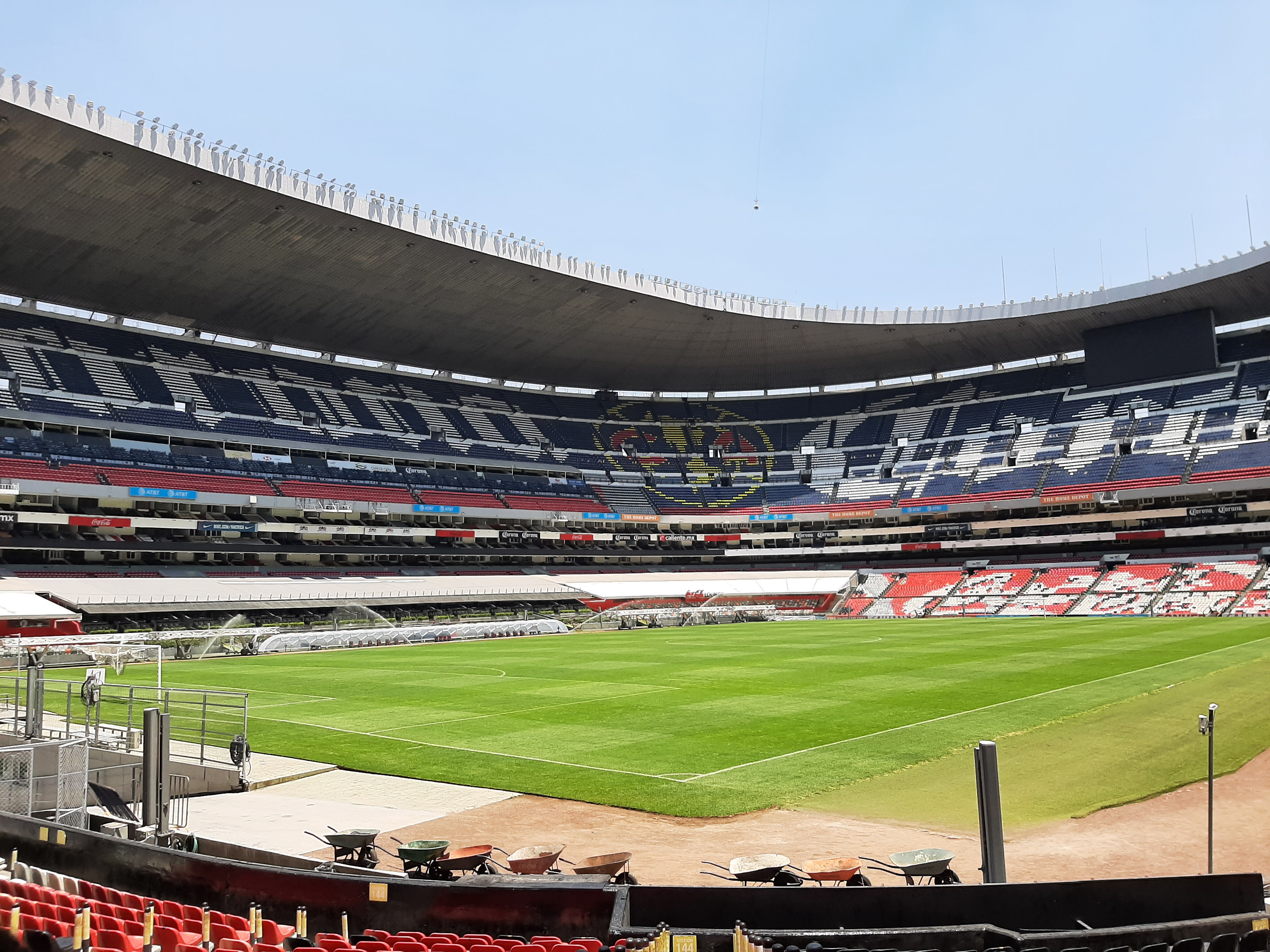
Estadio Azteca in Mexico

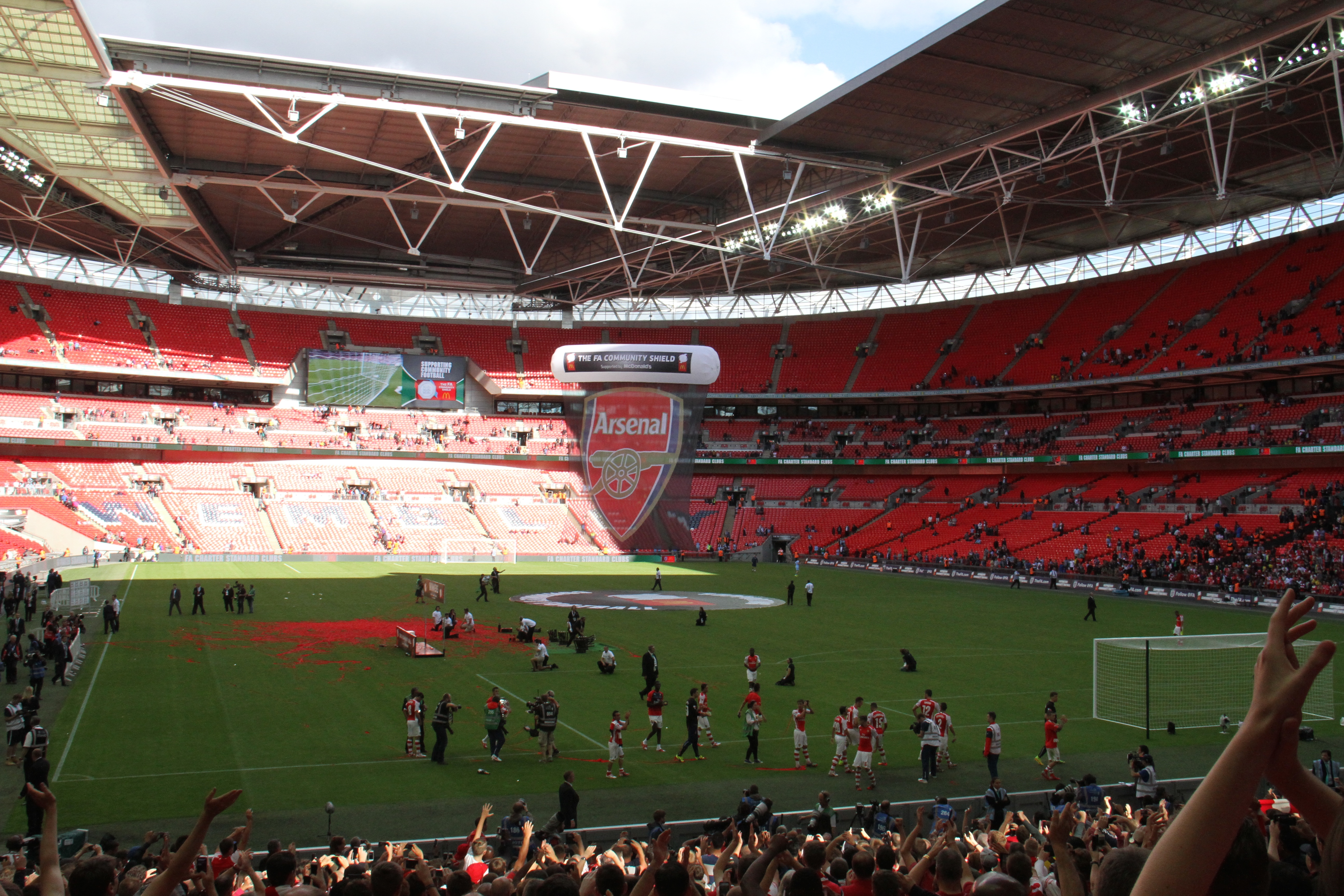
Wembley Stadium in London, England

Many countries have a national sport stadium, which typically serves as the primary or exclusive home for one or more of a country's national representative sports teams. The term is most often used in reference to an association football stadium. Usually, a national stadium will be in or very near a country's capital city or largest city. It is generally (but not always) the country's largest and most lavish sports venue with a rich history of hosting a major moment in sports (e.g. FIFA World Cup, Olympics, etc.). In many, but not all cases, it is also used by a local team. Many countries, including Spain and the United States, do not have a national stadium designated as such; instead matches are rotated throughout the country. The lack of a national stadium can be seen as advantageous as designating a single stadium would limit the fan base capable of realistically attending matches as well as the concern of the cost of transportation, especially in the case of the United States due to its geographical size and high population.

A list of national stadiums follows:

== Afghanistan ==
- Ghazi Amanullah International Cricket Stadium (cricket)
- National Stadium (football)

== Albania ==
- Arena Kombëtare

== Algeria ==
- Stade 5 Juillet 1962 (football)

== American Samoa ==
- Veterans Memorial Stadium (football)

== Andorra ==
- Estadi de la FAF (football)
- Poliesportiu d'Andorra (basketball and roller hockey)

== Angola ==
- Estádio 11 de Novembro (football)

== Antigua and Barbuda ==
- Antigua Recreation Ground (cricket and football)

== Argentina ==
- Estadio Único (football) – since 2025
- Estadio Multipropósito Parque Roca (basketball and tennis)
- Estadio Nacional de Hockey (field hockey)
- Campo Argentino de Polo (polo)
- CeNARD (athletics)
- Estadio José Amalfitani, also known as Vélez Sársfield (rugby union)—Although the national team plays Tests at several venues around the country, most of their home Tests against teams in the Six Nations and Tri Nations are held here.

== Armenia ==
- Hrazdan Stadium (football)
- Vazgen Sargsyan Republican Stadium (football)

== Aruba ==
- Trinidad Stadium (football and athletics)

== Australia ==
Australia does not have an official national stadium. The country's two largest stadiums, which host major domestic and international events, are:

- Melbourne Cricket Ground (Melbourne) – primarily used for cricket and Australian rules football, the MCG has notably hosted the 1956 Summer Olympics (opening and closing ceremonies), the 1992 and 2015 Cricket World Cup finals, and the 2006 Commonwealth Games (opening and closing ceremonies).
- Stadium Australia (Sydney) – primarily used for rugby league, rugby union, and association football, Stadium Australia has notably hosted the 2000 Summer Olympics (opening and closing ceremonies), the 2003 Rugby World Cup final, and the 2023 FIFA Women's World Cup final.

== Austria ==
- Ernst Happel Stadion (football)

== Azerbaijan ==
- Baku National Stadium (football)

== Bahamas ==
- Thomas Robinson Stadium (football and athletics)

== Bahrain ==
- Bahrain National Stadium (football)

== Bangladesh ==
- National Stadium, Dhaka (football and athletics)
- Sher-e-Bangla National Cricket Stadium (cricket)

== Barbados ==
- Aquatic Centre (artistic swimming, swimming, and water polo)
- Barbados National Stadium (football, outdoor track and field)

== Belarus ==
- Dinamo Stadium (football and athletics)
- National Football Stadium (football)

== Belgium ==
- King Baudouin Stadium (football and athletics)

== Belize ==
- FFB Stadium (football)

== Benin ==
- Stade de l'Amitié (football)

== Bermuda ==
- Bermuda National Stadium (football, rugby union, athletics and cricket)

== Bhutan ==
- Changlimithang Stadium (football and archery)

== Bolivia ==
- Estadio Hernando Siles (football and athletics)

== Bosnia and Herzegovina ==
- Bilino Polje Stadium
- Koševo Olympic Stadium

== Botswana ==
- Botswana National Stadium (football)

== Brazil ==
- Brazil does not have an official national stadium. Mostly (football) matches are commonly held in alternate venues. However, during reconstruction for the 2014 FIFA World Cup and as the capital city's and country's greatest stadium, the name Estádio Nacional (Portuguese for National Stadium) was added to the old Mané Garrincha stadium, leaving its official name as Estádio Nacional de Brasília Mané Garrincha, even though it doesn't act as a solo national stadium. The largest and most well known stadium in Brazil is Estádio do Maracanã located at Rio de Janeiro. The Brazil national football team have most of their high-profile matches in the Maracanã and the venue has hosted multiple World Cup and Copa America matches throughout its history including the two World Cup finals that Brazil has hosted (1950 and 2014).
- Ginásio do Maracanãzinho (futsal, volleyball and basketball)

== Brunei Darussalam ==
- Sultan Hassanal Bolkiah Stadium (football)

== Bulgaria ==
- Vasil Levski National Stadium (football and athletics)

== Burkina Faso ==
- Stade du 4-Août (football)

== Burundi ==
- Intwari Stadium (football)

== Cambodia ==
- Phnom Penh National Olympic Stadium (football and athletics)
- Morodok Techo National Stadium (football and athletics)

== Cameroon ==
- Ahmadou Ahidjo Stadium (football and athletics)

== Canada ==
- Sobeys Stadium & Stade IGA (tennis)
- BC Place (soccer and rugby union). Although a 2007 report from FIFA referred to BMO Field as Canada's national stadium, due to BC Place's indoor field being playable year-round and its higher capacity, many major soccer events are held there instead, such as the final match of the 2015 FIFA Women's World Cup. Similarly, while the national rugby team has no official stadium, most of their matches are split between BC Place and BMO Field
- BMO Field (soccer and rugby union)
- Lamport Stadium (rugby league)
- Maple Leaf Cricket Club (cricket)
- Rogers Centre (baseball)
- Scotiabank Arena (basketball)

Prior to confederation with Canada, the Dominion of Newfoundland used King George V Park as its national stadium.

== Cape Verde ==
- Estádio Nacional de Cabo Verde (football)

== Central African Republic ==
- Stade Barthélemy Boganda (football)

== Chad ==
- Stade Idriss Mahamat Ouya (football)

== Chile ==
- Estadio Nacional Julio Martínez Prádanos (football)
- Court Central Anita Lizana (tennis)

== China ==
- Beijing National Stadium (Athletics)
- National Tennis Center (Tennis)

== Colombia ==
- Estadio Metropolitano Roberto Meléndez (football)

== Comoros ==
- Stade Said Mohamed Cheikh (football)

== Democratic Republic of the Congo ==
- Stade des Martyrs (football and athletics)

== Republic of the Congo ==
- Stade Alphonse Massemba-Débat (football)

== Cook Islands ==
- Avarua Tereora Stadium (football and rugby union)

== Costa Rica ==
- Estadio Nacional de Costa Rica (football and athletics)

== Cuba ==
- Estadio Latinoamericano (baseball)

== Cyprus ==
- GSP Stadium (football)

== Czech Republic ==
- Strahov Stadium (Sokol)
- Sinobo Stadium (football)
- O2 arena (ice hockey)

== Denmark ==
- Parken Stadium (football)
- Royal Arena (handball and ice hockey)
- Svanholm Park (cricket)

== Djibouti ==
- Stade du Ville (football)

== Dominica ==
- Windsor Park (cricket and football)

== Dominican Republic ==
- Estadio Olímpico Félix Sánchez (athletics and football)
- Estadio Quisqueya (baseball)

== East Timor ==
- National Stadium (football)

== Ecuador ==
- Estadio Olímpico Atahualpa (football and athletics)

== Egypt ==
- Borg El Arab Stadium (football)
- Cairo International Stadium (football and athletics)
- Misr Stadium (football and athletics)

== El Salvador ==
- Estadio Cuscatlán (football)

== Equatorial Guinea ==
- Estadio de Malabo (football)

== Eritrea ==
- Cicero Stadium (football)

== Estonia ==
- Kadriorg Stadium (athletics)
- Lilleküla Stadium (football)

== Eswatini ==
- Somhlolo National Stadium (association football)

== Ethiopia ==
- Addis Ababa Stadium (football)
- Bahir Dar Stadium (football)

== Faroe Islands ==
- Tórsvøllur (football)

== Fiji ==
- HFC Bank Stadium (football and rugby union)
- National Hockey Centre (field hockey)

== Finland ==
- Helsinki Olympic Stadium (football and athletics)
- Hartwall Areena (ice hockey)

== France ==
- Stade de France (football, rugby union, and athletics)
  - In the case of rugby, the national team plays Test matches throughout the country, but it uses Stade de France exclusively for its fixtures in the Six Nations Championship.

== Gabon ==
- Stade d'Angondjé (football)

== Gambia ==
- Independence Stadium (football)

== Georgia ==
- Boris Paichadze Dinamo Arena (football and rugby union)

== Germany ==
- The Germany national football team usually plays at different stadiums throughout the country. However, the venue for the German Cup final is the Olympiastadion in Berlin. As a multipurpose stadium, the Berlin Olympiastadion also hosts international athletic competitions and other events. However, the Munich Olympiastadion was used for the finals of international football competitions held during the later West German era, such in the 1974 FIFA World Cup and UEFA Euro 1988.
- Lanxess Arena (handball and ice hockey)
- Uber Arena (basketball)
- OWL Arena (tennis)
- Warsteiner HockeyPark (field hockey)
- Fritz-Grunebaum-Sportpark (rugby union)

== Ghana ==
- Ohene Djan Stadium (football)

== Greece ==
- Olympic Stadium (Football and athletics)
- O.A.C.A. Olympic Indoor Hall (Basketball)

== Greenland ==
- Nuuk Stadium (football)
- New National Stadium (proposed)

== Grenada ==
- Kirani James Athletic Stadium (football and athletics)
- Queen's Park (cricket)

== Guatemala ==
- Estadio Doroteo Guamuch Flores (football and athletics)

== Guinea ==
- Stade 28 Septembre (football)

== Guinea-Bissau ==
- Estádio 24 de Setembro (football)

== Guyana ==
- Bourda (cricket)

== Haiti ==
- Stade Sylvio Cator (football)

== Honduras ==
- Estadio Olímpico Metropolitano (football and athletics)
- Estadio Nacional Chelato Uclés (football)

== Hong Kong ==
- Hong Kong Football Club Stadium (rugby union)
- Hong Kong Stadium (football) – hosted the inaugural AFC Asian Cup in 1956 and East Asian Games in 2009.
- Kai Tak Sports Park (football and rugby sevens)

== Hungary ==
- Puskás Aréna (football)

== Iceland ==
- Laugardalsvöllur (football)

== India ==
- Jawaharlal Nehru Stadium (athletics)
- Major Dhyan Chand National Stadium (field hockey)

== Indonesia ==
- Gelora Bung Karno Sports Complex
  - Gelora Bung Karno Stadium (football and athletics)
  - Istora Gelora Bung Karno (badminton)
  - Indonesia Arena (basketball, volleyball, and futsal)
  - Gelora Bung Karno Aquatic Stadium (aquatic sports)
  - Jakarta International Equestrian Park (equestrian)
  - Jakarta International Velodrome (track cycling)

== Iran ==
- Azadi Stadium

== Iraq ==
- Basra International Stadium

== Ireland ==
This section includes national stadia for sports governed by bodies representing the Republic of Ireland and All-Ireland. See the Northern Ireland section for remaining Irish national stadia.

- Aviva Stadium (association football and rugby union)
- Croke Park (Gaelic football and hurling)
- Morton Stadium (athletics)
- National Stadium (boxing)
- National Basketball Arena (basketball)

Notes
The following venues are "designated national sporting arenas" for the purposes of Section 21 of the Intoxicating Liquor Act 2003 (which regulates sale of alcohol at sports venues): National Stadium, Croke Park, Semple Stadium, Royal Dublin Society, Aviva Stadium, Thomond Park.

== Israel ==
- Bloomfield Stadium, Tel Aviv (football)
- Teddy Stadium, Jerusalem (football)
- Sammy Ofer Stadium, Haifa (football)
- Netanya Stadium, Netanya (football)
- Turner Stadium, Be'er Sheva (football)
- Menora Mivtachim Arena, Tel Aviv (basketball)
- Drive in Arena, Tel Aviv (basketball and judo)
- Pais Arena, Jerusalem (judo)
- Canada Stadium, Ramat HaSharon (tennis)

== Italy ==
- Stadio Olimpico (Olympics and rugby union)
  - In the case of rugby union, the national team plays matches throughout the country, but since 2012 they has used the Stadio Olimpico for all of its home Six Nations matches. Previously, Stadio Flaminio served the same purpose.
- Stadio Steno Borghese (baseball)
- PalaLido (roller hockey, handball, gymnastics, and wrestling)
- Pala Alpitour (ice hockey)
- Velodromo Vigorelli (American football)
- Massimo Falsetti Cricket Field (cricket)

== Ivory Coast ==
- Stade Félix Houphouët-Boigny (football)
- Alassane Ouattara Stadium (football)

== Jamaica ==
- Independence Park (football and athletics)
- Sabina Park (cricket)

== Japan ==
- Ariake Coliseum (tennis)
- Tokyo Dome (baseball)
- Koshien Stadium (baseball)
- National Stadium (football and athletics)
- International Stadium Yokohama (football)
- Chichibunomiya Rugby Stadium (rugby union)—The Japan national team plays matches at several venues around the country, but Chichibunomiya is the most commonly used, and the country's national federation is headquartered here.
- Kokugikan (Sumo)

== Jordan ==
- Amman International Stadium (football)

== Kazakhstan ==
- Astana Arena (football)

== Kenya ==
- Nyayo National Stadium (Association football, athletics, and basketball)
- Kasarani Stadium (football and athletics)

== Kiribati ==
- Bairiki National Stadium (football)

== Republic of Korea ==
- Seoul Olympic Stadium (athletics)
- Seoul World Cup Stadium (football)
- Gocheok Sky Dome (Baseball)

== Democratic People's Republic of Korea ==
- Kim Il-sung Stadium (football and athletics)
- Rungnado May Day Stadium

== Kosovo ==
- Fadil Vokrri Stadium (football)
- Palace of Youth and Sports (basket)

== Kuwait ==
- Jaber Al-Ahmad International Stadium (football)

== Kyrgyzstan ==
- Dolen Omurzakov Stadium (football and athletics)

== Latvia ==
- Arēna Rīga (basketball, ice hockey, and volleyball)
- Nacionālais Stadions Daugava (association football)

== Lesotho ==
- Setsoto Stadium (football and athletics)

== Lebanon ==
- Camille Chamoun Sports City Stadium

== Liberia ==
- Samuel Kanyon Doe Sports Complex (association football)

== Libya ==
- Tripoli Stadium (association football)

== Liechtenstein ==
- Rheinpark Stadion (football)

== Lithuania ==
- Darius and Girėnas Stadium (men football)
- LFF Stadium (women football)
- Palanga Stadium (athletics)
- SEB Arena (tennis)
- Utena Hippodrome (baseball)

== Luxembourg ==
- Stade de Luxembourg (football & rugby union)
- d'Coque (basketball, handball & volleyball)
- Kockelscheuer Sport Centre (tennis)
- Pierre Werner Cricket Ground (cricket)

== Macau ==
- Macau East Asian Games Dome (track and field, basketball and badminton)
- Estádio Campo Desportivo

== Malawi ==
- Bingu National Stadium (football and athletics)

== Malaysia ==
- Arena Nicol David (squash)
- Axiata Arena (badminton)
- Stadium Negara
- Bukit Jalil National Stadium (Football and athletics)
- National Hockey Stadium (Field hockey)

== Maldives ==
- National Football Stadium (football)

== Mali ==
- Stade du 26 Mars (Football and athletics)

== Malta ==
- Ta' Qali Stadium (football)
- Hibernians Ground (Rugby union)

== Martinique ==
- Stade d'Honneur (football and athletics)

== Mauritania ==
- Complexe Olympique de la République Islamique de Mauritanie (football)

== Mexico ==
- Estadio Azteca (football)
- Estadio Olimpico Universitario (athletics)
- Revolution Ice Rink (ice hockey)

== Moldova ==
- Zimbru Stadium (football)
- Complexul Sportiv Raional Orhei (rugby union)

== Monaco ==
- Stade Louis II (football and athletics)
- Salle Gaston Médecin (basketball, volleyball, handball, judo, fencing, weightlifting and gymnastics)
- Monte Carlo Country Club (tennis)

== Montenegro ==
- Podgorica City Stadium (football)

== Morocco ==
- Stade Mohammed V (athletics)
- Salle Mohammed V (volleyball, basketball, handball)
- Salle Moulay Abdellah (volleyball, basketball, handball)
- Stade Père Jégo (rugby union)

== Myanmar ==
- Bogyoke Aung San Stadium
- National Indoor Stadium (badminton)
- Thuwunna Stadium (association football)
- Wunna Theikdi Sports Stadium (association football)

== Namibia ==
- Independence Stadium (athletics and football)
- Hage Geingob Stadium (rugby union)
- Wanderers Cricket Ground (cricket)

== Nepal ==
- Dasarath Rangasala Stadium (association football and athletics)
- Pokhara Stadium (multi-purpose)
- Sahid Stadium (association football)
- NSC Covered Hall (basketball and taekwondo)
- Tribhuvan University International Cricket Ground (cricket)

== Netherlands ==
- Olympisch Stadion (athletics)
- Wagener Stadium (field hockey)
- VRA Cricket Ground (cricket)
- Thialf (speed skating)
- Nationaal Rugby Centrum Amsterdam (rugby union)

== Nicaragua ==
- Estadio Dennis Martinez (baseball and football)

== Niger ==
- Stade Général Seyni Kountché (association football and athletics)

== Nigeria ==
- Godswill Akpabio International Stadium (football and other sports)
- Moshood Abiola National Stadium (football and other sports)
- Lagos National Stadium (football and other sports)

== Norway ==
- Ullevaal Stadion (football)
- Bislett Stadion (athletics)
- Holmenkollen National Arena (Nordic skiing and biathlon)

== North Macedonia ==
- Toše Proeski Arena (football)

== Oman ==
- Sultan Qaboos Sports Complex (association football)

== Pakistan ==
- National Stadium, Karachi (Cricket)
- Gaddafi Stadium, Lahore (Cricket)
- Punjab Stadium, Lahore (Football)
- National Hockey Stadium, Lahore (Field hockey)

== Palau ==
- Palau National Stadium (PCC Palau Track & Field Stadium), (football and other sports)

== Panama ==
- Estadio Nacional de Panamá (baseball)
- Estadio Rommel Fernández (Football)

== Papua New Guinea ==
- Sir Hubert Murray Stadium (rugby league, football)

== Paraguay ==
- Estadio Defensores del Chaco (football)

== Peru ==
- Estadio Nacional (Lima) (football and athletics)

== Philippines ==
- Rizal Memorial Sports Complex
  - Rizal Memorial Baseball Stadium (baseball)
  - Rizal Memorial Coliseum (basketball and other indoor sports)
  - Rizal Memorial Stadium (athletics, football)
- New Clark City Athletics Stadium (athletics)

== Poland ==
- Kazimierz Górski National Stadium (football) - home stadium of the Poland men's national football team.
- Gdańsk Stadium (football) - home stadium of the Poland women's national football team.
- Śląski Stadium (football) - this stadium was previously designated by Polish Football Association as Poland men's national football team's official national stadium.
- National Rugby Stadium, rugby union national stadium
- Torwar Hala Sportowo-Widowiskowa (judo)
- Torwar II Lodowisko (figure skating)

== Portugal ==
- Estádio Nacional (football and athletics). However, the national football team very seldom plays there..
- Estádio Universitário de Lisboa (rugby union)
- Estoril Court Central (tennis)
- Altice Arena (futsal, roller hockey, basketball, handball and volleyball)

== Puerto Rico ==
- Hiram Bithorn Stadium, San Juan, a baseball park

== Qatar ==
- Jassim bin Hamad Stadium (football)
- Khalifa International Stadium (football)

== Romania ==
- Arena Națională (football)
- Stadionul Național de Rugby (rugby union) — The national team plays occasional matches at other venues around the country, but the vast majority of matches are held here.

== Russia ==
- Luzhniki Stadium (football and athletics)

== Rwanda ==
- Amahoro National Stadium (association football)
- Kigali Arena (basketball)

== Saint Kitts and Nevis ==
- Warner Park Sporting Complex (cricket and football)

== Saint Lucia ==
- George Odlum Stadium (Association football and athletics)

== Saint Vincent and the Grenadines ==
- Arnos Vale Stadium (cricket and football)

== San Marino ==
- San Marino Stadium (football)
- Stadio di Baseball di Serravalle (baseball)

== Serbia ==
- Partizan Stadium (football)
- Red Star Stadium (football)
- Belgrade Arena (basketball)

== Singapore ==
- National Stadium (football, athletics)
- Jalan Besar Stadium (football)

== Slovakia ==
- Aegon Arena (tennis)
- National football stadium (football)
- Ondrej Nepela Arena (ice hockey)

== Slovenia ==
- Stadion Stožice (football)
- Arena Stožice (basketball, ice hockey, handball, volleyball)

== Somalia ==
- Eng. Yariisow Stadium (association football)
- Mogadishu Stadium

== Spain ==
- Estadio de La Cartuja (association football cup finals since 2020)
- Palacio de Deportes de la Comunidad de Madrid (basketball and handball)
- Caja Mágica (tennis)
- Estadio Nacional Complutense (rugby union)

== Sierra Leone ==
- National Stadium (football and athletics)

== Solomon Islands ==
- National Stadium (association football, rugby, and athletics)

== South Africa ==
FNB Stadium, Johannesburg

== Sri Lanka ==
- R. Premadasa Stadium (Cricket)
- Colombo Racecourse (Rugby Union)
- Pallekele International Cricket Stadium (Cricket)

== Suriname ==
- André Kamperveen Stadion (football)

== Sweden ==
- Strawberry Arena (men's football)
- Gamla Ullevi (women's football)
- 3Arena (American football, speedway)
- Stockholms Stadion (athletics)
- Ericsson Globe (ice hockey)
- Lugnet (Nordic skiing)
- Åre Ski Area (alpine skiing)
- Östersund Ski Stadium (biathlon)
- Stadium Arena (basketball)
- Nya Örvallen (baseball)
- Eriksdalsbadet (swimming)

== Switzerland ==
- Palexpo (tennis)

== Syria ==
- Aleppo International Stadium (football)

== Taiwan ==
- Kaohsiung National Stadium (a.k.a. World Games Stadium) (football and athletics)

== Tajikistan ==
- Pamir Stadium (football and athletics)

== Tanzania ==
- Benjamin Mkapa Stadium (football and athletics)

== Thailand ==
- Rajamangala Stadium (football and athletics)
- National Stadium (Thailand) (football and athletics)

== Togo ==
- Stade de Kégué (football)

== Trinidad and Tobago ==
- Hasely Crawford Stadium (football and athletics)

== Turkey ==
- Atatürk Olympic Stadium (football and athletics)

== Turkmenistan ==
- Olympic Stadium (football and athletics)

== Tunisia ==
- Stade Olympique de Rades (football and athletics)
- Stade El Menzah (football)
- Stade Mustapha Ben Jannet (football)
- Salle Omnisport de Rades (Basketball), (Handball) and (Volleyball)

== Uganda ==
- Mandela National Stadium (football and athletics)

== Ukraine ==
- Olimpiysky National Sports Complex (football and athletics)

== United Arab Emirates ==
- Abu Dhabi International Tennis Centre (tennis)
- Al Maktoum Stadium (association football)
- Al Nahyan Stadium (association football)
- Hazza bin Zayed Stadium (association football)
- Maktoum bin Rashid Al Maktoum Stadium (association football)
- Mohammed bin Zayed Stadium (association football)
- Zabeel Stadium (association football)
- Zayed Sports City Stadium (association football)

== United Kingdom ==
Team sports in the United Kingdom are often governed by bodies representing the Home Nations of England, Scotland, Wales and Northern Ireland – with some sports organised on an All-Ireland basis. In international sporting events these sports are contested not by a team representing the United Kingdom, but by teams representing the separate home nations, and as a result there are separate national stadiums for many sports.

- London Stadium (athletics)
- National Basketball Performance Centre (basketball)
- Wimbledon Centre Court (tennis)
- Silverstone Circuit (motorsport)

=== England ===
- Wembley Stadium (association football)
- Twickenham (rugby union)

=== Scotland ===
- Hampden Park (football)
- Murrayfield (rugby union)
- The Grange (cricket)

=== Wales ===
- Millennium Stadium (rugby union)
- Cardiff City Stadium (football)
- Sophia Gardens (cricket)

=== Northern Ireland ===
- Windsor Park (football)

For other sports, see Ireland

=== England and Wales ===
- Lord's (cricket)

== United States ==
- USA Hockey has designated home arenas for some of its teams. The national under-17 and under-18 boys' teams play home games at USA Hockey Arena in Plymouth, Michigan. The national sled hockey team trains at Tim Hortons Iceplex in Brighton, New York and plays most of its home games at LECOM Harborcenter in Buffalo, New York, the last of which has also hosted numerous other USA Hockey events.
- Pettit National Ice Center (speed skating)
- Most of the most popular sports in the United States do not rely on a single national stadium, instead rotating the highest profile contests among various neutral sites.
- Howard J. Lamade Stadium (Little League Baseball)—Lamade Stadium is the primary stadium of the Little League World Series, hosting the final every year. It is one of two stadiums at the Little League headquarters complex in South Williamsport, Pennsylvania that permanently hosts the LLWS, with Volunteer Stadium as the other.
- Augusta National Golf Club (men's golf)—Augusta is home of The Masters, the only one of the three U.S.-based men's major golf tournaments to be held at a constant venue year after year; the U.S. Open and PGA Championship are both held at rotating venues.
- Mission Hills Country Club (women's golf)—Mission Hills hosts the ANA Inspiration, only one of the three U.S.-based women's major golf tournaments to be held at a constant venue year after year; the U.S. Women's Open and Women's PGA Championship are both held at rotating venues.
- Arthur Ashe Stadium (tennis)—primary stadium of the lone U.S. tennis major, the US Open. The stadium is the centerpiece of a complex known as the USTA Billie Jean King National Tennis Center.
- Auto racing, although its leading competitions are both touring circuits, feature flagship races at de facto national speedways: Indianapolis Motor Speedway for open-wheel racing, Circuit of the Americas for Formula One, and Daytona International Speedway for stock car racing.
- Churchill Downs and Belmont Park (horse racing)—each track hosts a leg in the Triple Crown of American Thoroughbred Racing, and both have hosted the most prominent race outside the Triple Crown, the Breeders' Cup Classic, which is part of the Breeders' Cup event held annually at rotating venues. (Pimlico, the site of the other leg of the Triple Crown, has never hosted the Breeders' Cup.)
- Like Spain, Brazil, Australia, Germany, and Italy, the US national soccer team has no dedicated stadium or arena. They play at different venues throughout the country for exhibition or tournament purposes. However, 21 games were held in RFK Stadium in the country's capital, Washington, D.C., more than any other venue in the country, which led to suggestions that RFK Memorial was the de facto national stadium prior to its 2019 closure. The women's soccer team also has no dedicated venue.
- USA Softball Hall of Fame Stadium serves as the home of the men's and women's national teams as well as the headquarters of USA Softball.

== Uruguay ==
- Estadio Centenario (football)
- Estadio Charrúa (rugby union)

== Uzbekistan ==
- Milliy Stadium (association football)
- Pakhtakor Central Stadium (association football)

== Vatican City ==
Stadio Petriana (football)—because the Vatican City does not have enough territory to house a sports stadium, Stadio Petriana is in fact situated within the bounds of Italy.

== Venezuela ==
- Estadio Polideportivo de Pueblo Nuevo (football)

== Vietnam ==
- Mỹ Đình National Stadium (football)

== Zambia ==
- National Heroes Stadium (football)

== Zimbabwe ==
- National Sports Stadium (football, rugby union and athletics)

== See also ==
- Lists of stadiums
