= 1997 SEAT Open =

- Date: 20–26 October
- Edition: 2nd
- Category: Tier III
- Draw: 30S / 16D
- Prize money: $164,250
- Surface: Carpet / indoor
- Location: Kockelscheuer, Luxembourg

Champions

Singles
- (South Africa) Amanda Coetzer

Doubles
- (Latvia) Larisa Neiland / (Czech Republic) Helena Suková
← 1996 ·	SEAT Open	· 1998 →

The 1997 SEAT Open was a women's tennis tournament played on indoor carpet courts in Kockelscheuer, Luxembourg that was part of the Tier III category of the 1997 WTA Tour. It was the second edition of the tournament and was held from 20 October until 26 October 1997. First-seeded Amanda Coetzer won the singles title.

== Finals ==
=== Singles ===
(South Africa) Amanda Coetzer defeated (Austria) Barbara Paulus 6–4, 3–6, 7–5

- It was Coetzer's 2nd and last singles title of the year and the 5th of her career.

=== Doubles ===
(Latvia) Larisa Neiland / (Czech Republic) Helena Suková defeated (Germany) Meike Babel / (Belgium) Laurence Courtois 6–2, 6–4

- It was Neiland's 2nd and last doubles title of the year and the 60th of her career. It was Suková's 2nd and last doubles title of the year and the 68th of her career.
