= 2007 Fortis Championships Luxembourg – Doubles =

Doubles
- 2007 Fortis Championships Luxembourg

Final
- Champions: (Czech Republic) Iveta Benešová (Slovakia) Janette Husárová
- Runners-up: (Belarus) Victoria Azarenka (Israel) Shahar Pe'er
- Score: 6–4, 6–2

Events
Singles	Doubles
← 2006 ·	Fortis Championships Luxembourg	· 2008 →

Květa Peschke and Francesca Schiavone were the defending champions, but neither participated in the doubles competition of the tournament. Iveta Benešová and Janette Husárová won the title, defeating Victoria Azarenka and Shahar Pe'er 6–3, 6–4 in the final.

== Seeds ==
1. (Chinese Taipei) Chan Yung-jan / (United States) Meghann Shaughnessy (quarterfinals)
2. (Netherlands) Michaëlla Krajicek / (Czech Republic) Vladimíra Uhlířová (semifinals)
3. (Czech Republic) Iveta Benešová / (Slovakia) Janette Husárová (champions)
4. (France) Émilie Loit / (United States) Meilen Tu (withdrew)

== Draw ==
=== Key ===
- Q = Qualifier
- WC = Wild card
- LL = Lucky loser
- Alt = Alternate
- SE = Special exempt
- PR = Protected ranking
- ITF = ITF entry
- JE = Junior exempt
- w/o = Walkover
- r = Retired
- d = Defaulted
- SR = Special ranking

First round
1	(Chinese Taipei) Y-j Chan (United States) M Shaughnessy	6	6
(France) N Dechy (France) T Golovin	4	3
(Ukraine) A Bondarenko (Ukraine) K Bondarenko	6	4	4
(Russia) V Dushevina (Ukraine) T Perebiynis	2	6	10
Alt	(Romania) S Cîrstea (Belgium) Y Wickmaer	6	4	11
(Poland) A Radwańska (Tunisia) S Sfar	3	6	9
(Poland) K Jans (Poland) A Rosolska	2	3
WC	(Belarus) V Azarenka (Israel) S Pe'er	6	6
(Poland) K Kosińska (Germany) T Malek	4	4
(Bosnia and Herzegovina) M Jugić-Salkić (Czech Republic) G Navrátilová	6	6
(Switzerland) T Bacsinszky (Italy) K Knapp	2	3
3	(Czech Republic) I Benešová (Slovakia) J Husárová	6	6
(Romania) A Ehritt-Vanc (Czech Republic) B Záhlavová-Strýcová	2	6	7
WC	(Luxembourg) A Kremer (Luxembourg) C Schaul	6	2	10
(Ukraine) Y Beygelzimer (Ukraine) Y Fedak	6	3	10
2	(Netherlands) M Krajicek (Czech Republic) V Uhlířová	4	6	12

Quarterfinals
1	(Chinese Taipei) Y-j Chan (United States) M Shaughnessy	2	6	4
(Russia) V Dushevina (Ukraine) T Perebiynis	6	4	10
Alt	(Romania) S Cîrstea (Belgium) Y Wickmaer	0	3
(Belarus) V Azarenka (Israel) S Pe'er	6	6
(Bosnia and Herzegovina) M Jugić-Salkić (Czech Republic) G Navrátilová	6	0	6
3	(Czech Republic) I Benešová (Slovakia) J Husárová	4	6	10
WC	(Luxembourg) A Kremer (Luxembourg) C Schaul	5	3
2	(Netherlands) M Krajicek (Czech Republic) V Uhlířová	7	6

Semifinals
(Russia) V Dushevina (Ukraine) T Perebiynis	2	2
(Belarus) V Azarenka (Israel) S Pe'er	6	6
3	(Czech Republic) I Benešová (Slovakia) J Husárová	2	6	10
2	(Netherlands) M Krajicek (Czech Republic) V Uhlířová	6	3	7

Final
(Belarus) V Azarenka (Israel) S Pe'er	4	2
3	(Czech Republic) I Benešová (Slovakia) J Husárová	6	6
