= 1997 SEAT Open – Doubles =

Doubles
- 1997 SEAT Open

Final
- Champions: (Latvia) Larisa Neiland (Czech Republic) Helena Suková
- Runners-up: (Germany) Meike Babel (Belgium) Laurence Courtois
- Score: 6–1, 6–0

Details
- Draw: 16
- Seeds: 4

Events
Singles	Doubles
← 1996 ·	SEAT Open	· 1998 →

Kristie Boogert and Nathalie Tauziat were the defending champions but only Boogert competed that year with Amanda Coetzer.

Boogert and Coetzer lost in the quarterfinals to Annica Lindstedt and Caroline Schneider.

Larisa Neiland and Helena Suková won in the final 6–1, 6–0 against Meike Babel and Laurence Courtois.

== Seeds ==
Champion seeds are indicated in bold text while text in italics indicates the round in which those seeds were eliminated.

1. (Latvia) **Larisa Neiland** / (Czech Republic) **Helena Suková (champions)**
2. (Belgium) Sabine Appelmans / (Netherlands) Miriam Oremans (quarterfinals)
3. (Czech Republic) Eva Melicharová / (Czech Republic) Helena Vildová (semifinals)
4. (Netherlands) Kristie Boogert / (South Africa) Amanda Coetzer (quarterfinals)

== Draw ==
=== Key ===
- Q = Qualifier
- WC = Wild card
- LL = Lucky loser
- Alt = Alternate
- ITF = ITF entry
- PR = Protected ranking
- SR = Special ranking
- SE = Special exempt
- JE = Junior exempt
- JR = Junior Accelerator Programme entrant
- CO = College Accelerator Programme entrant
- NG = Next Gen Accelerator Program entrant
- w/o = Walkover
- r = Retired
- d = Defaulted

First round
1	(Latvia) **L Neiland** (Czech Republic) **H Suková**	**6**	**6**
Q	(Germany) A Glass (South Africa) J Kruger	3	3
(Sweden) Å Carlsson (Switzerland) P Schnyder	**6**	4	3
(Germany) **W Probst** (Japan) **A Sugiyama**	0	**6**	**6**
3	(Czech Republic) **E Melicharová** (Czech Republic) **H Vildová**	**w/o**
(Germany) B Rittner (France) A-G Sidot
(Poland) A Olsza (United Kingdom) S-A Siddall	2	4
LL	(France) **C Dhenin** (Bulgaria) **M Maleeva**	**6**	**6**
(Sweden) **A Lindstedt** (Germany) **C Schneider**	**w/o**
(France) J Halard-Decugis (France) S Testud
(Germany) K Freye (Germany) S Meier	2	2
4	(Netherlands) **K Boogert** (South Africa) **A Coetzer**	**6**	**6**
WC	(Luxembourg) A Kremer (Spain) M Serna	2	4
(Germany) **M Babel** (Belgium) **L Courtois**	**6**	**6**
(Slovakia) K Habšudová (Argentina) F Labat	3	**6**	6
2	(Belgium) **S Appelmans** (Netherlands) **M Oremans**	**6**	3	**7**

Quarterfinals
1	(Latvia) **L Neiland** (Czech Republic) **H Suková**	**6**	**7**
(Germany) W Probst (Japan) A Sugiyama	2	5
3	(Czech Republic) **E Melicharová** (Czech Republic) **H Vildová**	2	**6**	**7**
LL	(France) C Dhenin (Bulgaria) M Maleeva	**6**	4	5
(Sweden) **A Lindstedt** (Germany) **C Schneider**	**6**	**6**
4	(Netherlands) K Boogert (South Africa) A Coetzer	3	3
(Germany) **M Babel** (Belgium) **L Courtois**	**6**	**6**
2	(Belgium) S Appelmans (Netherlands) M Oremans	3	2

Semifinals
1	(Latvia) **L Neiland** (Czech Republic) **H Suková**	**6**	**6**
3	(Czech Republic) E Melicharová (Czech Republic) H Vildová	2	3
(Sweden) A Lindstedt (Germany) C Schneider	1	0
(Germany) **M Babel** (Belgium) **L Courtois**	**6**	**6**

Final
1	(Latvia) **Larisa Neiland** (Czech Republic) **Helena Suková**	**6**	**6**
(Germany) Meike Babel (Belgium) Laurence Courtois	2	4
