= 1997 SEAT Open – Singles =

Tennis tournament

Singles
- 1997 SEAT Open

Final
- Champion: (South Africa) Amanda Coetzer
- Runner-up: (Austria) Barbara Paulus
- Score: 6–4, 3–6, 7–5

Details
- Draw: 28
- Seeds: 8

Events
Singles	Doubles
← 1996 ·	SEAT Open	· 1998 →

Anke Huber was the defending champion but did not compete that year.

Amanda Coetzer won in the final 6–4, 3–6, 7–5 against Barbara Paulus.

== Seeds ==
A champion seed is indicated in bold text while text in italics indicates the round in which that seed was eliminated. The top two seeds received a bye to the second round.

1. (South Africa) **Amanda Coetzer (champion)**
2. (Slovakia) Karina Habšudová (second round)
3. (France) Sandrine Testud (second round)
4. (Belgium) Sabine Appelmans (quarterfinals)
5. (Austria) Barbara Paulus (final)
6. (Indonesia) Yayuk Basuki (first round)
7. (United States) Kimberly Po (second round)
8. (Belarus) Natasha Zvereva (first round)

== Draw ==
=== Key ===
- Q = Qualifier
- WC = Wild card
- LL = Lucky loser
- Alt = Alternate
- ITF = ITF entry
- PR = Protected ranking
- SR = Special ranking
- SE = Special exempt
- JE = Junior exempt
- JR = Junior Accelerator Programme entrant
- CO = College Accelerator Programme entrant
- NG = Next Gen Accelerator Program entrant
- w/o = Walkover
- r = Retired
- d = Defaulted

=== Final ===
Final
1	(South Africa) **Amanda Coetzer**	**6**	3	**7**
5	(Austria) Barbara Paulus	4	**6**	5

=== Section 1 ===
First round
(Germany) M Babel	4	1
LL	(Italy) **S Farina**	**6**	**6**
WC	(Netherlands) **M Oremans**	**6**	**6**
WC	(Luxembourg) A Kremer	1	3
(Russia) **E Likhovtseva**	**7**	**6**
6	(Indonesia) Y Basuki	5	1
3	(France) **S Testud**	**6**	**6**
(Sweden) Å Carlsson	1	4
(South Africa) **J Kruger**	**6**	**6**
(Bulgaria) M Maleeva	2	3
(Japan) A Sugiyama	3	1
Q	(Slovakia) **K Studeníková**	**6**	**6**
Q	(Germany) B Rittner	**6**	5	1/r
7	(United States) **K Po**	0	**7**	**4**

Second round
1	(South Africa) **A Coetzer**	**6**	3	**6**
LL	(Italy) S Farina	2	**6**	3
WC	(Netherlands) **M Oremans**	2	**6**	**6**
(Russia) E Likhovtseva	**6**	3	0
3	(France) S Testud	2	1
(South Africa) **J Kruger**	**6**	**6**
Q	(Slovakia) **K Studeníková**	**6**	**6**
7	(United States) K Po	4	2

Quarterfinals
1	(South Africa) **A Coetzer**	**7**	6	**6**
WC	(Netherlands) M Oremans	5	**7**	4
(South Africa) J Kruger	3	4
Q	(Slovakia) **K Studeníková**	**6**	**6**

Semifinals
1	(South Africa) **A Coetzer**	**6**	3	**6**
Q	(Slovakia) K Studeníková	1	**6**	0

=== Section 2 ===
First round
5	(Austria) **B Paulus**	**6**	**6**
Q	(France) N Dechy	4	4
Q	(Germany) A Glass	4	4
(France) **A Mauresmo**	**6**	**6**
LL	(Italy) R Grande	1	**6**	1
(Czech Republic) **H Suková**	**6**	3	**6**
(Czech Republic) D Chládková	0	4
4	(Belgium) **S Appelmans**	**6**	**6**
8	(Belarus) N Zvereva	3	r
(Slovakia) **H Nagyová**	**3**
(Argentina) F Labat	4	4
(Japan) **N Sawamatsu**	**6**	**6**
(Switzerland) P Schnyder	**6**	2	2
(France) **A-G Sidot**	4	**6**	**6**

Second round
5	(Austria) **B Paulus**	**7**	**6**
(France) A Mauresmo	6	3
(Czech Republic) H Suková	3	**7**	2
4	(Belgium) **S Appelmans**	**6**	6	**6**
(Slovakia) **H Nagyová**	**6**	**6**
(Japan) N Sawamatsu	4	4
(France) **A-G Sidot**	3	**6**	**6**
2	(Slovakia) K Habšudová	**6**	2	4

Quarterfinals
5	(Austria) **B Paulus**	3	**6**	**6**
4	(Belgium) S Appelmans	**6**	3	2
(Slovakia) H Nagyová	4	6
(France) **A-G Sidot**	**6**	**7**

Semifinals
5	(Austria) **B Paulus**	**6**	**6**
(France) A-G Sidot	3	4
