= 2008 Fortis Championships Luxembourg – Singles =

Singles
- 2008 Fortis Championships Luxembourg

Final
- Champion: (Russia) Elena Dementieva
- Runner-up: (Denmark) Caroline Wozniacki
- Score: 2–6, 6–4, 7–6^{(7–4)}

Details
- Seeds: 8

Events
Singles	Doubles
- Fortis Championships Luxembourg

Ana Ivanovic was the defending champion, but chose to participate in Linz instead.

Elena Dementieva won in the final 2–6, 6–4, 7–6^{(7–4)}, against Caroline Wozniacki.

== Seeds ==
1. (Russia) Elena Dementieva (champion)
2. (Russia) Anna Chakvetadze (second round)
3. (Slovakia) Daniela Hantuchová (quarterfinals)
4. (Denmark) Caroline Wozniacki (final)
5. (France) Amélie Mauresmo (quarterfinals)
6. (China) Li Na (semifinals)
7. (Spain) Anabel Medina Garrigues (quarterfinals)
8. (Romania) Sorana Cîrstea (semifinals)

== Draw ==
Key

- Q = Qualifier
- WC = Wild card
- LL = Lucky loser
- Alt = Alternate
- ITF = ITF entry
- PR = Protected ranking
- SR = Special ranking
- SE = Special exempt
- JE = Junior exempt
- JR = Junior Accelerator Programme entrant
- CO = College Accelerator Programme entrant
- NG = Next Gen Accelerator Program entrant
- w/o = Walkover
- r = Retired
- d = Defaulted

=== Finals ===
Semifinals
1	(Russia) Elena Dementieva	6	6
8	(Romania) Sorana Cîrstea	2	2
4	(Denmark) Caroline Wozniacki	7	3	6
6	(China) Li Na	6^{1}	6	2

Final
1	(Russia) Elena Dementieva	2	6	7
4	(Denmark) Caroline Wozniacki	6	4	6^{4}

=== Top half ===
First round
1	(Russia) E Dementieva	7	6
Q	(Germany) T Malek	6^{5}	2
(Italy) T Garbin	4	2
(Argentina) G Dulko	6	6
(Germany) A-L Grönefeld	7	6
WC	(Belgium) Y Wickmayer	5	4
Q	(Germany) S Gehrlein	2	6	0
5	(France) A Mauresmo	6	3	6
3	(Slovakia) D Hantuchová	6	7
(France) P Parmentier	2	5
(Sweden) S Arvidsson	6	3	4
(Germany) S Lisicki	2	6	6
(Italy) S Errani	4	6	7
(New Zealand) M Erakovic	6	2	5
Q	(Ukraine) Y Fedak	6	2	2
8	(Romania) S Cîrstea	4	6	6

Second round
1	(Russia) E Dementieva	6	6
(Argentina) G Dulko	2	2
(Germany) A-L Grönefeld	3	1
5	(France) A Mauresmo	6	6
3	(Slovakia) D Hantuchová	6	6
(Germany) S Lisicki	0	2
(Italy) S Errani	4	2
8	(Romania) S Cîrstea	6	6

Quarterfinals
1	(Russia) E Dementieva	6	6
5	(France) A Mauresmo	4	0
3	(Slovakia) D Hantuchová	6^{2}	2
8	(Romania) S Cîrstea	7	6

Semifinals
1	(Russia) E Dementieva	6	6
8	(Romania) S Cîrstea	2	2

=== Bottom half ===
First round
7	(Spain) A Medina Garrigues	6	6
(Spain) V Ruano Pascual	2	1
Q	(Colombia) C Castaño	6	6
(Poland) M Domachowska	0	2
(China) S Peng	6	6
(Russia) V Dushevina	1	2
(Switzerland) T Bacsinszky	2	3
4	(Denmark) C Wozniacki	6	6
6	(China) N Li	6	6
WC	(Luxembourg) M Minella	2	1
(Bulgaria) T Pironkova	6	3	3
(Ukraine) M Koryttseva	3	6	6
WC	(United Kingdom) L Robson	6	2	3
(Czech Republic) I Benešová	1	6	6
(France) M Johansson	4	6^{4}
2	(Russia) A Chakvetadze	6	7

Second round
7	(Spain) A Medina Garrigues	6	4	7
Q	(Colombia) C Castaño	2	6	5
(China) S Peng	4	4
4	(Denmark) C Wozniacki	6	6
6	(China) N Li	7	6
(Ukraine) M Koryttseva	6^{6}	3
(Czech Republic) I Benešová	6	6
2	(Russia) A Chakvetadze	2	4

Quarterfinals
7	(Spain) A Medina Garrigues	1	6^{7}
4	(Denmark) C Wozniacki	6	7
6	(China) N Li	6	4	6
(Czech Republic) I Benešová	4	6	2

Semifinals
4	(Denmark) C Wozniacki	7	3	6
6	(China) N Li	6^{1}	6	2
