= 2008 Fortis Championships Luxembourg – Doubles =

Doubles
- 2008 Fortis Championships Luxembourg

Final
- Champions: (Romania) Sorana Cîrstea (New Zealand) Marina Erakovic
- Runners-up: (Russia) Vera Dushevina (Ukraine) Mariya Koryttseva
- Score: 2–6, 6–3, 10–8

Events
Singles	Doubles
← 2007 ·	Fortis Championships Luxembourg	· 2009 →

Iveta Benešová and Janette Husárová were the defending champions, but Husárová chose not to participate, and only Benešová competed that year.
Benešová partnered with Shuai Peng, but lost in the quarterfinals to Mervana Jugić-Salkić and Aurélie Védy.

Sorana Cîrstea and Marina Erakovic won in the final 2–6, 6–3, 10–8, against Vera Dushevina and Mariya Koryttseva.

== Seeds ==
1. (Spain) Anabel Medina Garrigues / (Spain) Virginia Ruano Pascual (semifinals)
2. (Czech Republic) Iveta Benešová / (China) Shuai Peng (quarterfinals)
3. (Russia) Vera Dushevina / (Ukraine) Mariya Koryttseva (final)
4. (Romania) Sorana Cîrstea / (New Zealand) Marina Erakovic (champions)

== Draw ==
=== Key ===
- Q = Qualifier
- WC = Wild card
- LL = Lucky loser
- Alt = Alternate
- SE = Special exempt
- PR = Protected ranking
- ITF = ITF entry
- JE = Junior exempt
- w/o = Walkover
- r = Retired
- d = Defaulted
- SR = Special ranking

=== Draw ===
First round
1	(Spain) A Medina Garrigues (Spain) V Ruano Pascual	7	6
(Germany) A-L Grönefeld (Turkey) I Şenoğlu	6^{5}	3
(Germany) A Petkovic (Germany) L Siegemund	1	7	[10]
(Colombia) C Castaño (Sweden) J Larsson	6	6^{1}	[5]
4	(Romania) S Cîrstea (New Zealand) M Erakovic	6	6
(United Kingdom) S Borwell (United States) C Nagle	1	0
(Poland) M Domachowska (Italy) T Garbin	5	3
(Luxembourg) M Minella (Luxembourg) C Schaul	7	6
(Ukraine) Y Fedak (Netherlands) M Krajicek	3	6	[10]
(South Africa) K Anderson (South Africa) C Scheepers	6	3	[8]
(Argentina) G Dulko (United Kingdom) L Robson	2	3
3	(Russia) V Dushevina (Ukraine) M Koryttseva	6	6
(Bosnia and Herzegovina) M Jugić-Salkić (France) A Védy	6	7
(Sweden) S Arvidsson (Finland) E Laine	3	5
(Czech Republic) E Birnerová (Germany) T Malek	2	4
2	(Czech Republic) I Benešová (China) S Peng	6	6

Quarterfinals
1	(Spain) A Medina Garrigues (Spain) V Ruano Pascual	6	6
(Germany) A Petkovic (Germany) L Siegemund	2	4
4	(Romania) S Cîrstea (New Zealand) M Erakovic	7	6
(Luxembourg) M Minella (Luxembourg) C Schaul	5	2
(Ukraine) Y Fedak (Netherlands) M Krajicek	5	4
3	(Russia) V Dushevina (Ukraine) M Koryttseva	7	6
(Bosnia and Herzegovina) M Jugić-Salkić (France) A Védy	6	6
2	(Czech Republic) I Benešová (China) S Peng	4	4

Semifinals
1	(Spain) A Medina Garrigues (Spain) V Ruano Pascual	1	6	[4]
4	(Romania) S Cîrstea (New Zealand) M Erakovic	6	3	[10]
3	(Russia) V Dushevina (Ukraine) M Koryttseva	7	6
(Bosnia and Herzegovina) M Jugić-Salkić (France) A Védy	5	1

Final
4	(Romania) S Cîrstea (New Zealand) M Erakovic	2	6	[10]
3	(Russia) V Dushevina (Ukraine) M Koryttseva	6	3	[8]
