= 2007 Fortis Championships Luxembourg – Singles =

Singles
- 2007 Fortis Championships Luxembourg

Final
- Champion: (Serbia) Ana Ivanovic
- Runner-up: (Slovakia) Daniela Hantuchová
- Score: 3–6, 6–4, 6–4

Details
- Seeds: 8

Events
Singles	Doubles
- Fortis Championships Luxembourg

Alona Bondarenko was the defending champion, but she was defeated in the first round by Marion Bartoli.

Second seeded Serbian Ana Ivanovic was the champion, coming back from a 3–6, 0–3 deficit to beat Slovak Daniela Hantuchová. It was her third title of the year and her fifth career title overall.

== Seeds ==
1. (Russia) Anna Chakvetadze (quarterfinals)
2. (Serbia) Ana Ivanovic (champion)
3. (Russia) Nadia Petrova (second round)
4. (Slovakia) Daniela Hantuchová (final)
5. (France) Marion Bartoli (semifinals)
6. (Switzerland) Patty Schnyder (quarterfinals)
7. (Israel) Shahar Pe'er (second round)
8. (France) Tatiana Golovin (quarterfinals)

== Draw ==
Key

- Q = Qualifier
- WC = Wild card
- LL = Lucky loser
- Alt = Alternate
- ITF = ITF entry
- PR = Protected ranking
- SR = Special ranking
- SE = Special exempt
- JE = Junior exempt
- JR = Junior Accelerator Programme entrant
- CO = College Accelerator Programme entrant
- NG = Next Gen Accelerator Program entrant
- w/o = Walkover
- r = Retired
- d = Defaulted

=== Finals ===
Semifinals
5	(France) Marion Bartoli	2	2
4	(Slovakia) Daniela Hantuchová	6	6
(Russia) Vera Zvonareva	4	2
2	(Serbia) Ana Ivanovic	6	6

Final
4	(Slovakia) Daniela Hantuchová	6	4	4
2	(Serbia) Ana Ivanovic	3	6	6

=== Top half ===
First round
(United States) M Tu	6	6
(Ukraine) J Vakulenko	4	3
(Austria) S Bammer	6	6
(Austria) T Paszek	0	2
(Ukraine) A Bondarenko	3	2
5	(France) M Bartoli	6	6
(United States) M Shaughnessy	4	1
Q	(Czech Republic) Z Ondrášková	6	6
Q	(Czech Republic) K Zakopalová	7	3
(France) É Loit	5	1	r
Q	(Ukraine) K Bondarenko	1	3
6	(Switzerland) P Schnyder	6	6

Second round
1	(Russia) A Chakvetadze	6	7
(United States) M Tu	1	6^{2}
(Austria) S Bammer	2	5
5	(France) M Bartoli	6	7
4	(Slovakia) D Hantuchová	6	6
Q	(Czech Republic) Z Ondrášková	4	1
Q	(Czech Republic) K Zakopalová	7	1	2
6	(Switzerland) P Schnyder	5	6	6

Quarterfinals
1	(Russia) A Chakvetadze	4	6	4
5	(France) M Bartoli	6	4	6
4	(Slovakia) D Hantuchová	6	5	7
6	(Switzerland) P Schnyder	3	7	5

Semifinals
5	(France) M Bartoli	2	2
4	(Slovakia) D Hantuchová	6	6

=== Bottom half ===
First round
7	(Israel) S Pe'er	6	6
(Czech Republic) L Šafářová	3	3
Q	(Germany) J Görges	7	4	2
(Russia) V Zvonareva	6^{4}	6	6
(Poland) A Radwańska	6	5	1
(Belarus) V Azarenka	4	7	6
8	(France) T Golovin	6	6
WC	(Romania) S Cîrstea	3	1
(Italy) F Schiavone	6	6
WC	(France) N Dechy	2	3
WC	(Luxembourg) A Kremer	6	7
(Netherlands) M Krajicek	3	6^{3}

Second round
7	(Israel) S Pe'er	6	1	4
(Russia) V Zvonareva	4	6	6
(Belarus) V Azarenka	6	6
3	(Russia) N Petrova	2	1
8	(France) T Golovin	6	6
(Italy) F Schiavone	3	1
WC	(Luxembourg) A Kremer	5	4
2	(Serbia) A Ivanovic	7	6

Quarterfinals
(Russia) V Zvonareva	6	7
(Belarus) V Azarenka	1	6^{5}
8	(France) T Golovin	1	2
2	(Serbia) A Ivanovic	6	6

Semifinals
(Russia) V Zvonareva	4	2
2	(Serbia) A Ivanovic	6	6
