= Kockelscheuer Sport Centre =

Tennis complex in Kockelscheuer, Luxembourg

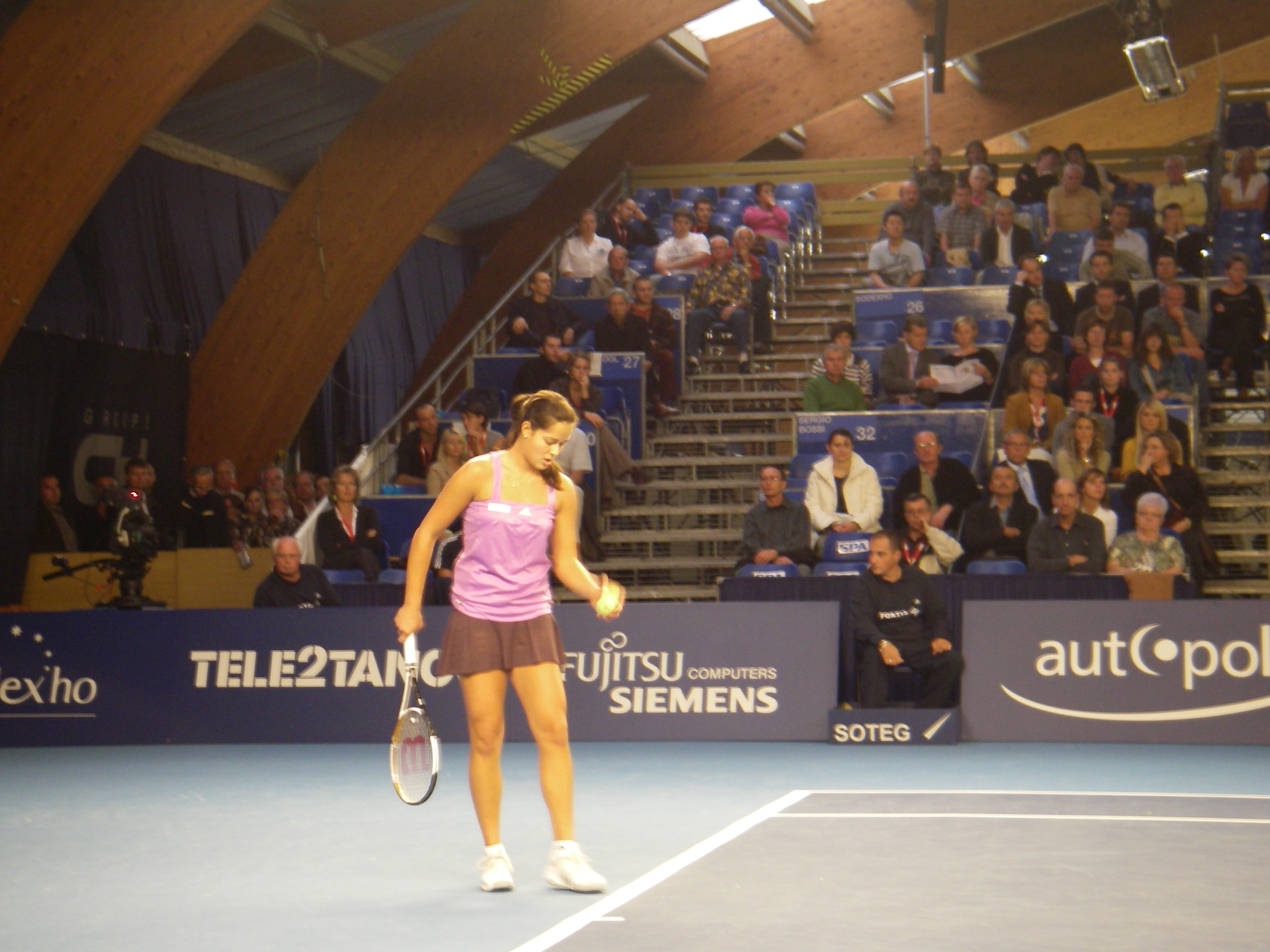
- Ana Ivanovic at the 2007 Luxembourg Open
- Interactive map of Kockelscheuer Sport Centre
- Full name: Kockelscheuer Sport Centre
- Location: Kockelscheuer, Luxembourg
- Coordinates: 49.57347°N 6.10980°E
- Owner: Luxembourg City
- Capacity: 2,500 (tennis)

Construction
- Opened: 1980

Tenants
- BGL Luxembourg Open (international) (Tennis) (1991–present)

The Kockelscheuer Sport Centre (aka CK Sportcenter, Kockelscheuer) CK Sportcenter is a sports center for amateur and professional players of tennis, squash, badminton, and padel, located in one of the largest indoor sports complexes, in Kockelscheuer, Luxembourg.

CK Sportcenter is located on the outskirts of Luxembourg City, in the Ban de Gasperich area. After several extensions and renovation works, CK Sportcenter now covers an area of around 2 hectares, surrounded by woodland.

In April 1984, a men's tournament single edition was organized as part of the Grand Prix circuit. It was played indoors on carpet. Ivan Lendl won the singles event after defeating Tomáš Šmíd in the final (6–4, 6–4) while singles runner-up Tomáš Šmíd teamed-up with Anders Järryd to win the doubles event against Mark Edmondson and Sherwood Stewart (6–3, 7–5).

Currently, the complex is the host of the annual international stop, the BGL Luxembourg Open.
