= 1996 SEAT Open – Singles =

Singles
- 1996 SEAT Open

Final
- Champion: (Germany) Anke Huber
- Runner-up: (Slovakia) Karina Habšudová
- Score: 6–3, 6–0

Details
- Draw: 32
- Seeds: 8

Events
Singles	Doubles
SEAT Open	· 1997 →

Anke Huber won in the final 6–3, 6–0 against Karina Habšudová.

== Seeds ==
A champion seed is indicated in bold text while text in italics indicates the round in which that seed was eliminated.

1. (Germany) **Anke Huber (champion)**
2. (South Africa) Amanda Coetzer (first round)
3. (Austria) Barbara Paulus (semifinals)
4. (France) Julie Halard-Decugis (first round)
5. (Slovakia) Karina Habšudová (final)
6. (Austria) Judith Wiesner (second round)
7. (Belgium) Sabine Appelmans (quarterfinals)
8. (France) Nathalie Tauziat (second round)

== Draw ==
=== Key ===
- Q = Qualifier
- WC = Wild card
- LL = Lucky loser
- Alt = Alternate
- SE = Special exempt
- PR = Protected ranking
- ITF = ITF entry
- JE = Junior exempt
- w/o = Walkover
- r = Retired
- d = Defaulted
- SR = Special ranking

First round
1	(Germany) **A Huber**	**6**	**6**
(Germany) B Rittner	3	4
(Poland) **A Olsza**	3	**6**	**6**
(Latvia) L Savchenko	**6**	2	4
(Romania) R Dragomir	2	0
(Belarus) **N Zvereva**	**6**	**6**
(Spain) G León García	4	1
6	(Austria) **J Wiesner**	**6**	**6**
4	(France) J Halard-Decugis	**6**	3	0
(France) **A-G Sidot**	4	**6**	**6**
(Switzerland) **P Schnyder**	**6**	**7**
(Belgium) D Van Roost	1	5
(Bulgaria) E Pampoulova	**6**	5	6
(Slovakia) **K Studeníková**	1	**7**	**7**
(Georgia (country)) L Meskhi	0	3
8	(France) **N Tauziat**	**6**	**6**
7	(Belgium) **S Appelmans**	**6**	**7**
WC	(Austria) S Dopfer	1	6
(Netherlands) M Oremans	3	2
(Germany) **P Begerow**	**6**	**6**
(Netherlands) **K Boogert**	3	**6**	**7**
Q	(Spain) M Serna	**6**	2	6
(Russia) E Makarova	3	**6**	5
3	(Austria) **B Paulus**	**6**	4	**7**
5	(Slovakia) **K Habšudová**	**6**	**6**
WC	(Luxembourg) R Moyen	2	2
Q	(Ukraine) **N Medvedeva**	**7**	**6**
Q	(Germany) J Kandarr	6	1
(Austria) **B Schett**	**7**	**6**
Q	(Poland) M Grzybowska	6	3
(Slovakia) **H Nagyová**	**7**	**6**
2	(South Africa) A Coetzer	6	3

Second round
1	(Germany) **A Huber**	**6**	1	**6**
(Poland) A Olsza	3	**6**	0
(Belarus) **N Zvereva**	**6**	**6**
6	(Austria) J Wiesner	4	2
(France) **A-G Sidot**	**6**	**6**
(Switzerland) P Schnyder	1	0
(Slovakia) **K Studeníková**	**6**	**6**
8	(France) N Tauziat	3	4
7	(Belgium) **S Appelmans**	**6**	**6**
(Germany) P Begerow	1	1
(Netherlands) K Boogert	1	4
3	(Austria) **B Paulus**	**6**	**6**
5	(Slovakia) **K Habšudová**	**w/o**
Q	(Ukraine) N Medvedeva
(Austria) B Schett	3	6
(Slovakia) **H Nagyová**	**6**	**7**

Quarterfinals
1	(Germany) **A Huber**	**6**	**6**
(Belarus) N Zvereva	1	3
(France) **A-G Sidot**	**6**	**6**
(Slovakia) K Studeníková	2	1
7	(Belgium) S Appelmans	**6**	4	4
3	(Austria) **B Paulus**	4	**6**	**6**
5	(Slovakia) **K Habšudová**	**6**	**6**
(Slovakia) H Nagyová	0	1

Semifinals
1	(Germany) **A Huber**	**6**	**7**
(France) A-G Sidot	4	6
3	(Austria) B Paulus	**7**	5	3
5	(Slovakia) **K Habšudová**	5	**7**	**6**

Final
1	(Germany) **Anke Huber**	**6**	**6**
5	(Slovakia) Karina Habšudová	3	0
