= ATP Luxembourg =

Defunct tennis tournament
- Tour: Grand Prix circuit
- Founded: 1984
- Abolished: 1984
- Editions: 1
- Location: Luxembourg
- Surface: Carpet / indoor

The ATP Luxembourg is a defunct tennis tournament that was played on the Grand Prix tennis circuit for one year in 1984. The event was held at Kockelscheuer Sport Centre in Luxembourg and was played on indoor carpet. Ivan Lendl won the singles event while Anders Järryd and Tomáš Šmíd teamed-up to win the doubles event.

== Finals ==
=== Singles ===
Year	Champion	Runner-up	Score
1984	(Czech Republic) Ivan Lendl	(Czech Republic) Tomáš Šmíd	6–4, 6–4

=== Doubles ===
Year	Champion	Runner-up	Score
1984	(Sweden) Anders Järryd (Czech Republic) Tomáš Šmíd	(Australia) Mark Edmondson (United States) Sherwood Stewart	6–3, 7–5
