= 1996 SEAT Open – Doubles =

Doubles
- 1996 SEAT Open

Final
- Champions: (Netherlands) Kristie Boogert (France) Nathalie Tauziat
- Runners-up: (Germany) Barbara Rittner (Belgium) Dominique Van Roost
- Score: 2–6, 6–4, 6–2

Events
Singles	Doubles
← 1995 ·	SEAT Open	· 1997 →

Kristie Boogert and Nathalie Tauziat won in the final 2–6, 6–4, 6–2 against Barbara Rittner and Dominique Van Roost.

== Seeds ==
Champion seeds are indicated in bold text while text in italics indicates the round in which those seeds were eliminated.

1. (Netherlands) **Kristie Boogert** / (France) **Nathalie Tauziat (champions)**
2. (Belgium) Sabine Appelmans / (Netherlands) Miriam Oremans (semifinals)
3. (South Africa) Amanda Coetzer / (Romania) Ruxandra Dragomir (first round)
4. (Italy) Laura Golarsa / (Germany) Christina Singer (semifinals)

== Draw ==
=== Key ===
- Q = Qualifier
- WC = Wild card
- LL = Lucky loser
- Alt = Alternate
- SE = Special exempt
- PR = Protected ranking
- ITF = ITF entry
- JE = Junior exempt
- w/o = Walkover
- r = Retired
- d = Defaulted
- SR = Special ranking

First round
1	(Netherlands) **K Boogert** (France) **N Tauziat**	**6**	**6**
(Germany) S Schmidle (Germany) J Wöhr	0	3
(Romania) **C Cristea** (France) **A-G Sidot**	6	**6**	**6**
(Russia) E Makarova (Georgia (country)) L Meskhi	**7**	3	1
4	(Italy) **L Golarsa** (Germany) **C Singer**	**6**	**6**
(Poland) M Mróz (Germany) N Nittinger	1	1
(Germany) C Schneider (Slovakia) K Studeníková	2	**6**	3
(Poland) **M Grzybowska** (Slovakia) **K Habšudová**	**6**	3	**6**
(Germany) P Begerow (Germany) J Kandarr	**7**	4	3
(Germany) **Adriana Barna** (Germany) **Anca Barna**	5	**6**	**6**
(Germany) **B Rittner** (Belgium) **D Van Roost**	**6**	4	**6**
3	(South Africa) A Coetzer (Romania) R Dragomir	3	**6**	3
(Austria) **B Schett** (Switzerland) **P Schnyder**	**6**	**6**
(Slovakia) H Nagyová (Poland) A Olsza	1	4
(Netherlands) S Noorlander (Czech Republic) H Vildová	**6**	1	4
2	(Belgium) **S Appelmans** (Netherlands) **M Oremans**	3	**6**	**6**

Quarterfinals
1	(Netherlands) **K Boogert** (France) **N Tauziat**	**6**	**6**
(Romania) C Cristea (France) A-G Sidot	3	1
4	(Italy) **L Golarsa** (Germany) **C Singer**	**6**	**6**
(Poland) M Grzybowska (Slovakia) K Habšudová	2	4
(Germany) Adriana Barna (Germany) Anca Barna	3	3
(Germany) **B Rittner** (Belgium) **D Van Roost**	**6**	**6**
(Austria) B Schett (Switzerland) P Schnyder	2	**6**	3
2	(Belgium) **S Appelmans** (Netherlands) **M Oremans**	**6**	4	**6**

Semifinals
1	(Netherlands) **K Boogert** (France) **N Tauziat**	**6**	**7**
4	(Italy) L Golarsa (Germany) C Singer	2	5
(Germany) **B Rittner** (Belgium) **D Van Roost**	**6**	**6**
2	(Belgium) S Appelmans (Netherlands) M Oremans	3	4

Final
1	(Netherlands) **Kristie Boogert** (France) **Nathalie Tauziat**	2	**6**	**6**
(Germany) Barbara Rittner (Belgium) Dominique Van Roost	**6**	4	2
