= 2014 IIHF World Championship Division III =

International ice hockey tournament

Tournament details
- Host country: Luxembourg
- Venue(s): 1 (in 1 host city)
- Dates: 6 – 12 April
- Teams: 6

Tournament statistics
- Games played: 15
- Goals scored: 179 (11.93 per game)
- Attendance: 6,050 (403 per game)

The 2014 IIHF World Championship Division III was an international ice hockey tournament organized by the International Ice Hockey Federation. It was contested in Luxembourg City, Luxembourg, from 6 to 12 April 2014. Division III represents the sixth tier of the Ice Hockey World Championships. Hong Kong returned to the World Championship for the first time since 1987.

== Venues ==
Division III
Kockelscheuer
Luxembourg Ice Rink
Capacity: 768
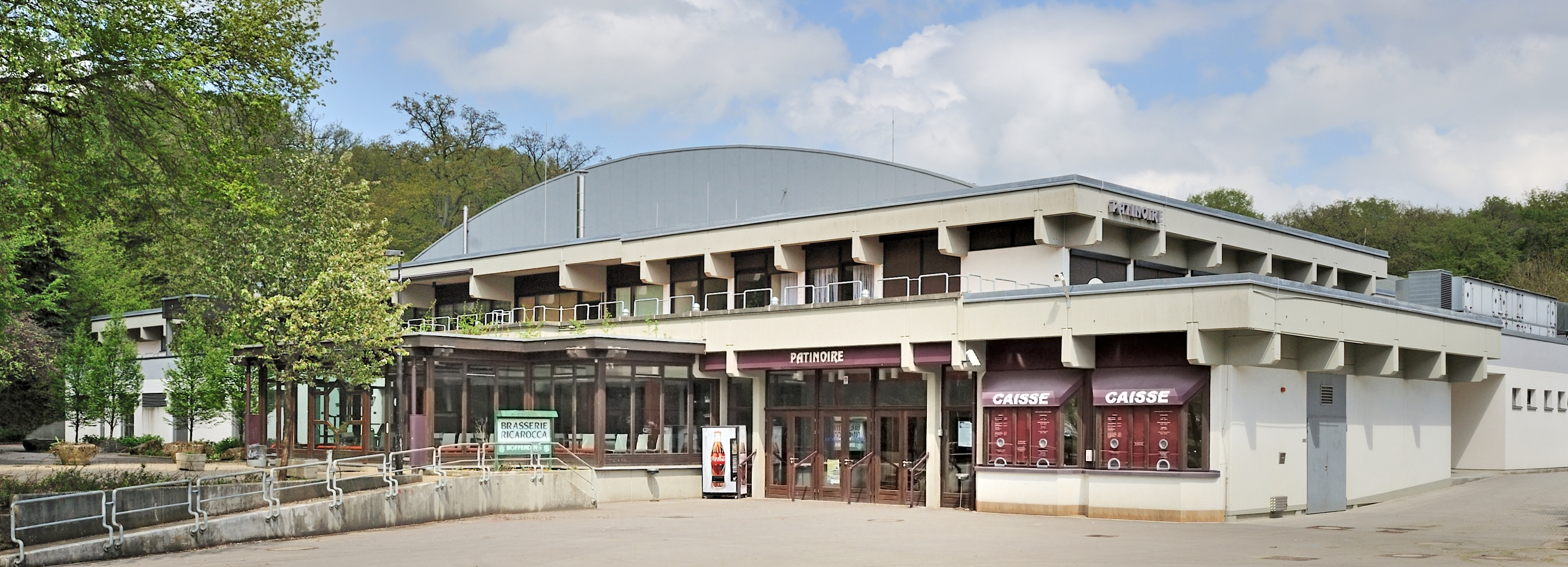

== Participants ==
Team	Qualification
Bulgaria	Placed 6th in Division II B last year and was relegated.
North Korea	Placed 2nd in Division III last year.
Luxembourg	Host, placed 3rd in Division III last year.
United Arab Emirates	Placed 6th in Division III last year.
Hong Kong	First participation since 1987.
Georgia	Placed 4th in Division III qualification tournament last year.

== Standings ==
Team	Pld	W	OTW	OTL	L	GF	GA	GD	Pts	Promotion
Bulgaria	5	5	0	0	0	48	13	+35	15	Promoted to 2015 Division II B
North Korea	5	4	0	0	1	54	11	+43	12	
Luxembourg	5	3	0	0	2	43	16	+27	9	
Hong Kong	5	1	1	0	3	17	27	−10	5	
United Arab Emirates	5	1	0	1	3	14	34	−20	4	
Georgia	5	0	0	0	5	3	78	−75	0	

Source: IIHF.com

== Results ==
All times are local (UTC+2).

6 April 2014; 12:30	Hong Kong	2–1 GWS (1–1, 0–0, 0–0) (OT 0–0) (SO: 1–0)	United Arab Emirates	Kockelscheuer Ice Rink, Kockelscheuer; Attendance: 100

Game reference
Ho King Chi King	Goalies	Khaled Al-Suwaidi	Referee: (Romania) Valentin Lascar; Linesmen: (Italy) Simone Lega (Hungary) Botond Palkovi
Choi Ho. (Choi Hi.) – 11:39 / 1–0; / 1–1 / 15:53 – O. Al-Shamisi (J. Al-Dhaheri, M. Al-Shamisi)			Referee: (Romania) Valentin Lascar; Linesmen: (Italy) Simone Lega (Hungary) Botond Palkovi
Kan S. (miss); Wong Y. Chow P. (miss)	Shootout	(miss) O. Al-Shamisi; (miss) A. Al-Mazrouei; (miss) J. Al-Dhaheri	Referee: (Romania) Valentin Lascar; Linesmen: (Italy) Simone Lega (Hungary) Botond Palkovi
14 min	Penalties	24 min	Referee: (Romania) Valentin Lascar; Linesmen: (Italy) Simone Lega (Hungary) Botond Palkovi
23	Shots	46	Referee: (Romania) Valentin Lascar; Linesmen: (Italy) Simone Lega (Hungary) Botond Palkovi

6 April 2014; 16:00	North Korea	22–1 (6–0, 9–0, 7–1)	Georgia	Kockelscheuer Ice Rink, Kockelscheuer; Attendance: 100

Game reference

Pak Kuk-chol
Pak Il
Goalies
Kakha Ambrolava
Konstantine Sanikidze
Referee:
(Estonia) Igor Tsernyshov
Linesmen:
(France) Thomas Caillot
(China) Cui Zhinan

Kim H-j. (Ri P-i.) – 06:13	1–0
Kim S-g. (Ju S-h.) – 09:18	2–0
Ri C-m. (Kim H-j.) – 10:31	3–0
Ri C-m. (Kim H-j.) (SH) – 15:10	4–0
Ri S-g. (Pak S-j., Kim K-h.) – 17:14	5–0
Kim M-c. (Ri P-i.) – 18:29	6–0
Kim M-c. (Ri C-m.) – 20:14	7–0
Kim J-h. (Ri C-j.) – 22:02	8–0
Ri S-g. (Ju S-h., Kim K-h.) – 23:33	9–0
Kim K-h (Pak S-j.) – 24:17	10–0
Kim H-j. (Kim M-c., Ri C-m.) – 25:33	11–0
An C-h. – 33:03	12–0
Kim N-h. (Kim C-h.) – 34:30	13–0
Kim N-h. (Ri C-m., An C-h.) – 35:26	14–0
Kim C-b. (Kim J-h.) – 37:04	15–0
Ju S-h. (Pak S-j., Kim S-g.) – 41:42	16–0
Kim K-c. (Kim C-h., Ri C-j.) – 42:08	17–0
Ri C-j. – 43:52	18–0
Ju S-h. (Ri S-g.) – 44:48	19–0
Kim H-j. (Kim M-c.) – 49:54	20–0
Kim H-j. (Kim M-c., Kim C-b.) (PP) – 53:30	21–0
	21–1	54:05 – G. Jeiranashvili
Kim J-h. (Ri C-j., Kim C-h.) (PP) – 58:45	22–1

8 min
Penalties
18 min
92
Shots
4

6 April 2014; 19:45	Luxembourg	5–8 (2–3, 3–3, 0–2)	Bulgaria	Kockelscheuer Ice Rink, Kockelscheuer; Attendance: 800

Game reference

Michel Welter
Goalies
Konstantin Mihailov
Referee:
(Belgium) Tim Tzirtziganis
Linesmen:
(Canada) Michael Johnstone
(Iceland) Orri Sigmarsson

	0–1	04:25 – A. Yotov (S. Muhachev) (PP)
	0–2	06:53 – A. Yotov (S. Muhachev) (SH)
	0–3	15:57 – A. Yotov (S. Muhachev)
E. Wambach (M. Eriksson) – 17:30	1–3
B. Houdremont (R. Beran, F. Schons) – 19:24	2–3
B. Welter (K. Gronlund, R. Beran) – 20:38	3–3
M. Eriksson (SH) – 28:38	4–3
	4–4	30:01 – S. Muhachev (A. Yotov, I. Hodulov)
M. Eriksson – 31:32	5–4
	5–5	35:37 – I. Hodulov (A. Yotov, M. Boyadjiev) (PP2)
	5–6	39:29 – B. Stefanov (I. Hodulov)
	5–7	46:08 – M. Eftimov
	5–8	46:23 – M. Nikolov (M. Eftimov, A. Vasilev)

12 min
Penalties
8 min
39
Shots
42

7 April 2014; 12:30	Georgia	0–12 (0–4, 0–3, 0–5)	Hong Kong	Kockelscheuer Ice Rink, Kockelscheuer; Attendance: 100

Game reference

Konstantine Sanikidze
Kakha Ambrolava
Goalies
Ho King Chi King
Keung Emerson Kwokway
Referee:
(Croatia) Tomislav Knežević
Linesmen:
(Lithuania) Vytautas Lukosevičius
(Iceland) Orri Sigmarsson

0–1	08:07 – Choi Hi. (Sham A., Kan S.) (PP)
0–2	15:42 – Choi Ho.
0–3	17:52 – Ho J. (Kan S.)
0–4	18:59 – Choi Hi. (Sham A.)
0–5	28:47 – Fung B. (Tai J.)
0–6	35:23 – Fung B. (Ho J.)
0–7	37:38 – Wong Y. (Ho J.) (PP)
0–8	40:49 – Fung B. (Ho J., Kan S.)
0–9	42:40 – T. Leung (Ho J.)
0–10	46:24 – Ho J. (Fung B.)
0–11	46:55 – Ho J. (Fung B., Kan S.)
0–12	54:07 – Mo H.

31 min
Penalties
8 min
10
Shots
55

7 April 2014; 16:00	Bulgaria	11–5 (5–3, 5–1, 1–1)	United Arab Emirates	Kockelscheuer Ice Rink, Kockelscheuer; Attendance: 100

Game reference

Radosvet Petrov
Goalies
Khaled Al-Suwaidi
Ahmed Al-Dhaheri
Referee:
(Estonia) Igor Tsernyshov
Linesmen:
(France) Thomas Caillot
(Italy) Simone Lega

I. Hodulov – 00:23	1–0
	1–1	01:01 – S. Al-Nuaimi (PP)
I. Hodulov (S. Muhachev, A. Yotov) (PP) – 03:21	2–1
S. Muhachev (A. Yotov) – 06:34	3–1
	3–2	08:04 – J. Al-Dhaheri (O. Al-Shamisi)
M. Eftimov (A. Yotov, I. Hodulov) (PP2) – 10:35	4–2
S. Muhachev (A. Yotov, I. Hodulov) – 13:22	5–2
	5–3	19:16 – S. Al-Nuaimi (M. Al-Mazrouei) (PP)
A. Yotov (S. Muhachev, I. Hodulov) – 20:14	6–3
B. Stefanov (A. Yotov, I. Hodulov) (PP) – 27:00	7–3
I. Hodulov (A. Yotov, S. Muhachev) – 28:50	8–3
S. Muhachev (A. Yotov) (PP) – 31:20	9–3
	9–4	32:11 – O. Al-Shamisi
M. Eftimov (PP) – 39:36	10–4
	10–5	47:38 – A. Al-Harmoodi (F. Al-Suwaidi)
I. Hodulov (T. Georgiev) – 50:52	11–5

12 min
Penalties
18 min
44
Shots
26

7 April 2014; 19:30	North Korea	7–3 (4–0, 3–0, 0–3)	Luxembourg	Kockelscheuer Ice Rink, Kockelscheuer; Attendance: 850

Game reference

Pak Kuk-chol
Pak Il
Goalies
Gilles Mangen
Michel Welter
Referee:
(Romania) Valentin Lascar
Linesmen:
(Canada) Michael Johnstone
(Hungary) Botond Palkovi

Ri C-m. (Hong C-r., Kim H-j.) – 10:17	1–0
Kim K-h. – 10:30	2–0
Ri C-j. (Kim K-c.) – 16:38	3–0
Hong C-r. (Ri C-m.) – 19:47	4–0
Kim H-j – 20:09	5–0
An C-h. (Kim H-j., Ri C-m.) (PP) – 29:09	6–0
An C-h. (Hong C-r., Ri C-m.) (PP) – 32:55	7–0
	7–1	43:37 – G. Scheier (E. Wambach)
	7–2	45:17 – B. Welter (G. Biver)
	7–3	49:15 – E. Wambach (G. Scheier)

8 min
Penalties
20 min
34
Shots
28

9 April 2014; 12:30	Bulgaria	19–1 (10–0, 4–1, 5–0)	Georgia	Kockelscheuer Ice Rink, Kockelscheuer; Attendance: 100

Game reference

Radosvet Petrov
Goalies
Kakha Ambrolava
Konstantine Sanikidze
Referee:
(Belgium) Tim Tzirtziganis
Linesmen:
(Canada) Michael Johnstone
(Lithuania) Vytautas Lukosevičius

I. Hodulov (M. Boyadjiev, B. Stefanov) – 04:02	1–0
B. Stefanov (M. Boyadjiev, I. Hodulov) (PP) – 06:30	2–0
M. Nikolov (A. Panev, N. Bozhanov) – 10:33	3–0
K. Monov (T. Georgiev, A. Vasilev) (PP) – 12:06	4–0
M. Boyadjiev (I. Hodulov) – 12:17	5–0
A. Vasilev (I. Velev, K. Monov) – 14:06	6–0
M. Boyadjiev (R. Petrov) – 15:15	7–0
T. Georgiev (K. Monov, I. Velev) (PP) – 17:27	8–0
I. Hodulov (M. Boyadjiev, M. Eftimov) – 18:24	9–0
M. Nikolov (A. Panev, N. Bozhanov) – 18:37	10–0
T. Georgiev (A. Vasilev) – 22:06	11–0
	11–1	27:09 – G. Gobejishvili (M. Davitashvili, A. Geperidze) (PP)
P. Mihov (Y. Gachev, A. Panev) (PP) – 31:29	12–1
A. Panev (Y. Gachev) – 33:43	13–1
A. Panev (P. Mihov) – 36:24	14–1
T. Georgiev (K. Monov, I. Velev) – 42:49	15–1
N. Bozhanov (T. Georgiev) – 45:15	16–1
T. Georgiev (I. Velev) – 50:11	17–1
P. Mihov (M. Nikolov, A. Panev) – 50:26	18–1
T. Georgiev (I. Velev, A. Vasilev) (PP) – 51:26	19–1

4 min
Penalties
10 min
78
Shots
10

9 April 2014; 16:00	North Korea	12–2 (3–2, 4–0, 5–0)	Hong Kong	Kockelscheuer Ice Rink, Kockelscheuer; Attendance: 100

Game reference

Pak Il
Goalies
Ho King Chi King
Heung Emerson Kwokway
Referee:
(Estonia) Igor Tsernyshov
Linesmen:
(France) Thomas Caillot
(Iceland) Orri Sigmarsson

	0–1	05:14 – Sham A.
Kim K-c. (Kim J-h., Ri C-j.) – 08:18	1–1
	1–2	13:16 – Kan S. (Ho J.)
Kim N-h. (Kim K-h.) – 13:52	2–2
Kim H-j. (Ri C-m.) – 15:27	3–2
Ju S-h. (Ri S-g.) (PP) – 24:28	4–2
Ri P-i. (An C-h.) – 25:54	5–2
Kim H-j. (Ri P-i.) (PP) – 35:44	6–2
Ju S-h. (Kim S-g., Kim K-h.) (PP) – 36:37	7–2
Kim M-c. (SH) – 43:07	8–2
Kim H-j. (Jon S-c.) (PP) – 48:09	9–2
Ri P-i. (Ju S-h.) – 54:03	10–2
Ju S-h. – 55:01	11–2
An C-h. (Kim H-j., Ri P-i.) (PP2) – 56:17	12–2

18 min
Penalties
20 min
53
Shots
11

9 April 2014; 19:30	Luxembourg	8–1 (4–0, 4–0, 0–1)	United Arab Emirates	Kockelscheuer Ice Rink, Kockelscheuer; Attendance: 850

Game reference

Michel Welter
Goalies
Ahmed Al-Dhaheri
Khaled Al-Suwaidi
Referee:
(Croatia) Tomislav Knežević
Linesmen:
(China) Cui Zhinan
(Hungary) Botond Palkovi

S. Backes – 08:17	1–0
M. Eriksson – 11:57	2–0
G. Scheier – 16:38	3–0
R. Scheier (B. Houdremont, B. Welter) (PP) – 18:15	4–0
B. Houdremont (K. Gronlund, B. Welter) (PP) – 26:20	5–0
B. Houdremont (R. Beran, C. Waltener) (PP2) – 30:20	6–0
R. Beran (B. Welter, C. Waltener) (PP) – 30:33	7–0
B. Welter (B. Houdremont) – 39:47	8–0
	8–1	43:34 – O. Al-Shamisi (PP)

22 min
Penalties
20 min
50
Shots
26

11 April 2014; 12:30	United Arab Emirates	1–12 (0–3, 1–4, 0–5)	North Korea	Kockelscheuer Ice Rink, Kockelscheuer; Attendance: 100

Game reference

Khaled Al-Suwaidi
Goalies
Pak Kuk-chol
Referee:
(Romania) Valentin Lascar
Linesmen:
(Canada) Michael Johnstone
(Iceland) Orri Sigmarsson

	0–1	06:27 – Hong C-r. (Ri C-m.)
	0–2	07:08 – Ri S-g. (Kim K-h., Kim S-g.) (PP)
	0–3	19:57 – Kim K-h. (Ri S-g., Ju S-h.)
	0–4	20:39 – Ri C-m. (Hong C-r.)
	0–5	23:13 – Hong C-r. (Kim H-j., An C-h.)
A. Al-Harmoodi (PP) – 25:18	1–5
	1–6	31:17 – Kim H-j. (Hong C-r., An C-h.) (PP)
	1–7	38:03 – Hong C-r. (PP)
	1–8	46:06 – Hong C-r. (Kim H-j., Kim M-c.)
	1–9	49:44 – Kim J-h. (Ri C-j., Kim K-c.)
	1–10	50:56 – Kim K-c. (Kim C-h.)
	1–11	51:41 – Kim J-h. (Ri C-j., Hong C-r.)
	1–12	53:07 – Kim S-g.

14 min
Penalties
6 min
15
Shots
60

11 April 2014; 16:00	Hong Kong	1–6 (1–1, 0–3, 0–2)	Bulgaria	Kockelscheuer Ice Rink, Kockelscheuer; Attendance: 100

Game reference

Keung Emerson Kwokway
Ho King Chi King
Goalies
Konstantin Mihailov
Dimitar Dimitrov
Referee:
(Croatia) Tomislav Knežević
Linesmen:
(China) Cui Zhinan
(Lithuania) Vytautas Lukosevičius

	0–1	01:10 – I. Hodulov (A. Yotov)
Sham A. (Tai J.) – 02:07	1–1
	1–2	25:25 – I. Hodulov
	1–3	27:06 – I. Hodulov (M. Boyadjiev, A. Yotov) (PP)
	1–4	34:25 – S. Muhachev (M. Nikolov) (PP)
	1–5	49:20 – I. Hodulov (A. Yotov) (PP)
	1–6	59:08 – P. Mihov (A. Yotov, N. Bozhanov) (PP)

26 min
Penalties
12 min
23
Shots
67

11 April 2014; 19:30	Georgia	0–19 (0–7, 0–6, 0–6)	Luxembourg	Kockelscheuer Ice Rink, Kockelscheuer; Attendance: 850

Game reference

Kakha Ambrolava
Konstantine Sanikidze
Goalies
Gilles Mangen
Referee:
(Belgium) Tim Tzirtziganis
Linesmen:
(Italy) Simone Lega
(Hungary) Botond Palkovi

0–1	00:22 – C. Waltener (B. Welter, B. Houdremont)
0–2	01:09 – R. Beran (B. Welter)
0–3	04:31 – G. Scheier (M. Eriksson, C. Thiry)
0–4	04:56 – M. Eriksson (G. Scheier)
0–5	12:53 – S. Minden (R. Scheier)
0–6	14:25 – T. Holtzem (B. Houdremont, C. Waltener)
0–7	14:39 – T. Holtzem (C. Waltener, B. Houdremont)
0–8	28:55 – P. Schön (B. Houdremont, C. Waltener)
0–9	30:07 – M. Eriksson (S. Backes, G. Biver)
0–10	32:13 – B. Houdremont (C. Waltener, F. Schons)
0–11	33:13 – G. Scheier (M. Eriksson, C. Thiry)
0–12	37:11 – G. Scheier (M. Eriksson, G. Biver) (PP)
0–13	39:42 – T. Holtzem (P. Schön, B. Houdremont)
0–14	40:41 – P. Schön (F. Schons, C. Thiry)
0–15	45:10 – M. Eriksson (P. Schön, C. Thiry)
0–16	45:58 – S. Backes (S. Minden, F. Davidson)
0–17	49:49 – R. Scheier (S. Minden, P. Bechthold) (SH)
0–18	50:03 – S. Minden (F. Davidson, P. Bechthold) (SH)
0–19	59:09 – S. Minden (S. Backes, T. Holtzem)

4 min
Penalties
4 min
4
Shots
71

12 April 2014; 12:30	Bulgaria	4–1 (0–1, 2–0, 2–0)	North Korea	Kockelscheuer Ice Rink, Kockelscheuer; Attendance: 500

Game reference

Konstantin Mihailov
Goalies
Pak Kuk-chol
Referee:
(Belgium) Tim Tzirtziganis
Linesmen:
(Italy) Simone Lega
(Hungary) Botond Palkovi

	0–1	06:19 – Hong C-r. (Ri C-m.)
I. Hodulov (A. Yotov, S. Muhachev) – 36:01	1–1
A. Yotov (B. Stefanov, S. Muhachev) – 39:10	2–1
A. Yotov (A. Vasilev) – 46:18	3–1
I. Hodulov (A. Yotov, M. Boyadjiev) (PP) – 53:55	4–1

30 min
Penalties
16 min
24
Shots
49

12 April 2014; 16:00	United Arab Emirates	6–1 (1–0, 3–1, 2–0)	Georgia	Kockelscheuer Ice Rink, Kockelscheuer; Attendance: 500

Game reference

Khaled Al-Suwaidi
Ahmed Al-Dhaheri
Goalies
Kakha Ambrolava
Referee:
(Estonia) Igor Tsernyshov
Linesmen:
(France) Thomas Caillot
(China) Cui Zhinan

S. Al-Nuaimi (M. Al-Mazrouei) – 07:48	1–0
M. Al-Mazrouei (F. Al-Suwaidi) (PP) – 21:36	2–0
	2–1	25:26 – I. Davidov
S. Al-Nuaimi (M. Al-Mazrouei, A. Al-Mazrouei) – 27:15	3–1
A. Al-Mazrouei (S. Al-Nuaimi, F. Al-Suwaidi) (PP) – 33:16	4–1
A. Al-Mazrouei (M. Al-Mazrouei, S. Al-Nuaimi) – 41:33	5–1
M. Al-Dhaheri (M. Al-Shamisi, M. Al-Mazrouei) (PP) – 44:13	6–1

22 min
Penalties
30 min
50
Shots
12

12 April 2014; 19:30	Luxembourg	8–0 (5–0, 0–0, 3–0)	Hong Kong	Kockelscheuer Ice Rink, Kockelscheuer; Attendance: 900

Game reference

Michel Welter
Goalies
Ho King Chi King
Keung Emerson Kwokway
Referee:
(Romania) Valentin Lascar
Linesmen:
(Canada) Michael Johnstone
(Lithuania) Vytautas Lukosevičius

M. Eriksson – 04:37	1–0
B. Houdremont (R. Beran, B. Welter) (PP) – 07:49	2–0
E. Wambach (G. Scheier) – 10:45	3–0
R. Beran (K. Gronlund, B. Houdremont) – 12:11	4–0
B. Welter (R. Beran, F. Schons) – 16:43	5–0
S. Minden (F. Schons, G. Scheier) (PP2) – 54:53	6–0
B. Houdremont (B. Welter, P. Schön) – 56:23	7–0
C. Waltener (E. Wambach, M. Eriksson) – 59:58	8–0

39 min
Penalties
18 min
46
Shots
18

== Awards and statistics ==
=== Awards ===
- Best players selected by the directorate:
  - Best Goaltender: (Hong Kong) Ho King Chi King
  - Best Defenceman: (Luxembourg) Clement Waltener
  - Best Forward: (Bulgaria) Alexei Yotov

Source: IIHF.com

=== Scoring leaders ===
List shows the top skaters sorted by points, then goals.

Player	GP	G	A	Pts	+/−	PIM	POS
(Bulgaria) Ivan Hodulov	5	13	8	21	+14	6	F
(Bulgaria) Alexei Yotov	5	6	15	21	+13	6	F
(North Korea) Kim Hyok-ju	5	9	7	16	+18	4	F
(Luxembourg) Ben Houdremont	5	6	8	14	+8	2	F
(Bulgaria) Stanislav Muhachev	5	5	8	13	+11	6	F
(North Korea) Ri Chol-min	5	4	9	13	+15	4	F
(Luxembourg) Marcus Eriksson	5	7	5	12	+12	4	F
(North Korea) Hong Chun-rim	5	6	5	11	+8	2	F
(Luxembourg) Benny Welter	5	4	7	11	+4	2	F
(North Korea) Ju Sung-hyok	5	5	4	9	+8	2	F
(Luxembourg) Georges Scheier	5	5	4	9	+8	10	F

GP = Games played; G = Goals; A = Assists; Pts = Points; +/− = Plus/minus; PIM = Penalties in minutes; POS = Position
Source: IIHF.com

=== Leading goaltenders ===
Only the top five goaltenders, based on save percentage, who have played at least 40% of their team's minutes, are included in this list.

Player	TOI	GA	GAA	SA	Sv%	SO
(Bulgaria) Konstantin Mihailov	167:59	7	2.50	108	93.52	0
(North Korea) Pak Kuk-chol	194:43	6	1.85	62	90.32	0
(Luxembourg) Michel Welter	219:32	11	3.01	104	89.42	1
(Hong Kong) Ho King Chi King	214:05	16	4.48	147	89.12	0
(Bulgaria) Radosvet Petrov	120:00	6	3.00	36	83.33	0

TOI = Time on Ice (minutes:seconds); SA = Shots against; GA = Goals against; GAA = Goals against average; Sv% = Save percentage; SO = Shutouts
Source: IIHF.com
