= 2007 Fortis Championships Luxembourg =

- Edition: 12th
- Category: Tier II
- Draw: 28S / 16D
- Prize money: $600,000
- Surface: Hard / Indoor
- Location: Kockelscheuer, Luxembourg

Champions

Singles
- (Serbia) Ana Ivanovic

Doubles
- (Czech Republic) Iveta Benešová / (Slovakia) Janette Husárová
- Fortis Championships Luxembourg

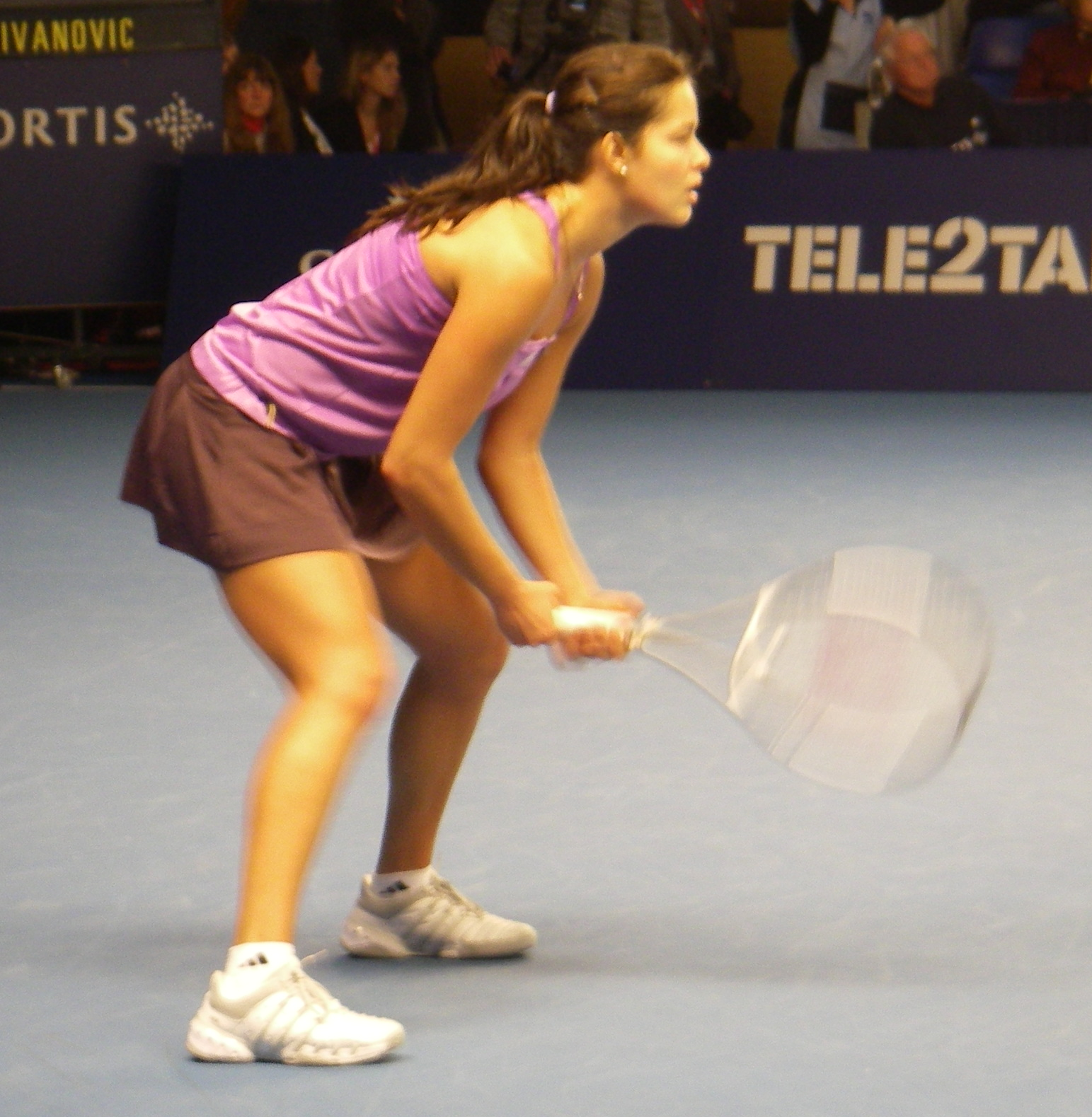
Ana Ivanovic playing at Fortis Championships, 2007

The 2007 Fortis Championships Luxembourg was a women's tennis tournament played on indoor hard courts. It was the 12th edition of the Fortis Championships Luxembourg, and was part of the Tier II Series of the 2007 WTA Tour. It was held in Kockelscheuer, Luxembourg. The singles title was won by Ana Ivanovic while the doubles title was won by Iveta Benešová and Janette Husárová.

== Finals ==
=== Singles ===
(Serbia) Ana Ivanovic defeated (Slovakia) Daniela Hantuchová, 3–6, 6–4, 6–4

=== Doubles ===
(Czech Republic) Iveta Benešová / (Slovakia) Janette Husárová defeated (Belarus) Victoria Azarenka / (Israel) Shahar Pe'er, 6–4, 6–2
