= Aquatics Centre =

Aquatics Centre (or Center) may refer to:

- London Aquatics Centre, venue during the 2012 Summer Olympics
- Manchester Aquatics Centre, venue during the 2002 Commonwealth Games
- Melbourne Sports and Aquatic Centre, venue during the 2006 Commonwealth Games
- New Clark City Aquatic Center, venue during the 2019 Southeast Asian Games
- Sydney Olympic Park Aquatic Centre, venue during the 2000 Summer Olympics
- Tokyo Aquatics Centre, venue during the 2020 Summer Olympics held in 2021
- Pan Am Sports Centre, venue during the 2015 Pan American Games

== See also ==
- Leisure centre
- List of water sports
- Swimming pool
