= 1998 SEAT Open – Singles =

Singles
- 1998 SEAT Open

Final
- Champion: (France) Mary Pierce
- Runner-up: (Italy) Silvia Farina
- Score: 6–0, 2–0 retired

Details
- Draw: 30
- Seeds: 8

Events
| Singles | Doubles |
- SEAT Open

Amanda Coetzer was the defending champion but lost in the first round to Elena Tatarkova.

Mary Pierce won the final 6–0, 2–0 after Silvia Farina was forced to retire.

== Seeds ==
A champion seed is indicated in bold text while text in italics indicates the round in which that seed was eliminated. The top two seeds received a bye to the second round.

1. (France) Nathalie Tauziat (semifinals)
2. (France) **Mary Pierce (champion)**
3. (Romania) Irina Spîrlea (quarterfinals)
4. (South Africa) Amanda Coetzer (first round)
5. (Japan) Ai Sugiyama (quarterfinals)
6. (Germany) Anke Huber (quarterfinals)
7. (Croatia) Iva Majoli (second round)
8. (Slovakia) Henrieta Nagyová (first round)

== Draw ==
Key

- Q = Qualifier
- WC = Wild card
- LL = Lucky loser
- Alt = Alternate
- ITF = ITF entry
- PR = Protected ranking
- SR = Special ranking
- SE = Special exempt
- JE = Junior exempt
- JR = Junior Accelerator Programme entrant
- CO = College Accelerator Programme entrant
- NG = Next Gen Accelerator Program entrant
- w/o = Walkover
- r = Retired
- d = Defaulted

=== Final ===
| Final |
| | (Italy) Silvia Farina | 0 | 0 | r |
| 2 | (France) **Mary Pierce** | **6** | **2** |

=== Top half ===
First round
(Spain) V Ruano Pascual | 4 | 2
Q | (Austria) **S Plischke** | **6** | **6**
(France) **A Mauresmo** | **6** | **6**
(Zimbabwe) C Black | 3 | 4
(Hungary) R Kuti-Kis | 5 | 2
6 | (Germany) **A Huber** | **7** | **6**
3 | (Romania) **I Spîrlea** | **6** | **6**
WC | (Netherlands) M Oremans | 3 | 1
(Spain) M Serna | **7** | 4 | 0
(Belgium) **S Appelmans** | 5 | **6** | **6**
(South Africa) J Kruger | 3 | 3
WC | (Luxembourg) **A Kremer** | **6** | **6**
(Italy) **S Farina** | **6** | **6**
8 | (Slovakia) H Nagyová | 3 | 3

Second round
1 | (France) **N Tauziat** | **6** | **6**
Q | (Austria) S Plischke | 2 | 4
(France) A Mauresmo | 3 | **7** | 1
6 | (Germany) **A Huber** | **6** | 6 | **6**
3 | (Romania) **I Spîrlea** | **6** | **6**
(Belgium) S Appelmans | 3 | 1
WC | (Luxembourg) A Kremer | 4 | 2
(Italy) **S Farina** | **6** | **6**

Quarterfinals
1 | (France) **N Tauziat** | **6** | **6**
6 | (Germany) A Huber | 3 | 3
3 | (Romania) I Spîrlea | 4 | **6** | 3
(Italy) **S Farina** | **6** | 4 | **6**

Semifinals
1 | (France) N Tauziat | 2 | **6** | 3
(Italy) **S Farina** | **6** | 2 | **6**

=== Bottom half ===
First round
7 | (Croatia) **I Majoli** | **6** | **6**
(Romania) R Dragomir | 2 | 4
(Poland) M Grzybowska | **6** | 1 | r
Q | (Russia) **E Kulikovskaya** | 1 | **5**
(Russia) **E Likhovtseva** | **6** | **6**
Q | (Italy) R Grande | 1 | 1
(Ukraine) **E Tatarkova** | **6** | **6**
4 | (South Africa) A Coetzer | 1 | 4
5 | (Japan) **A Sugiyama** | **6** | 3 | **6**
Q | (Czech Republic) K Hrdličková | 3 | **6** | 1
(France) A Fusai | 1 | 4
(Austria) **B Schett** | **6** | **6**
(France) A-G Sidot | 3 | 1
(France) **S Pitkowski** | **6** | **6**

Second round
7 | (Croatia) I Majoli | 2 | 4
Q | (Russia) **E Kulikovskaya** | **6** | **6**
(Russia) **E Likhovtseva** | **6** | **6**
(Ukraine) E Tatarkova | 2 | 1
5 | (Japan) **A Sugiyama** | **6** | 4 | **6**
(Austria) B Schett | 4 | **6** | 4
(France) S Pitkowski | **6** | 1 | 3
2 | (France) **M Pierce** | 4 | **6** | **6**

Quarterfinals
Q | (Russia) E Kulikovskaya | 2 | 0
(Russia) **E Likhovtseva** | **6** | **6**
5 | (Japan) A Sugiyama | 3 | 2
2 | (France) **M Pierce** | **6** | **6**

Semifinals
(Russia) E Likhovtseva | 1 | 5
2 | (France) **M Pierce** | **6** | **7**
