= 1998 SEAT Open – Doubles =

Doubles
- 1998 SEAT Open

Final
- Champions: (Russia) Elena Likhovtseva (Japan) Ai Sugiyama
- Runners-up: (Latvia) Larisa Neiland (Ukraine) Elena Tatarkova
- Score: 6–7^{(3–7)}, 6–3, 2–0 (Neiland and Tatarkova retired)

Events
Singles	Doubles
- SEAT Open

Larisa Neiland and Helena Suková were the reigning champions but only Neiland competed that year with Elena Tatarkova.

Neiland and Tatarkova lost the final 6–7^{(3–7)}, 6–3, 2–0 after they were forced to retire against Elena Likhovtseva and Ai Sugiyama.

== Seeds ==
Champion seeds are indicated in bold text while text in italics indicates the round in which those seeds were eliminated.

1. (France) Alexandra Fusai / (France) Nathalie Tauziat (first round)
2. (Latvia) Larisa Neiland / (Ukraine) Elena Tatarkova (final)
3. (Russia) **Elena Likhovtseva** / (Japan) **Ai Sugiyama (champions)**
4. (Belgium) Sabine Appelmans / (Netherlands) Miriam Oremans (quarterfinals)

== Draw ==
Key

- Q = Qualifier
- WC = Wild card
- LL = Lucky loser
- Alt = Alternate
- ITF = ITF entry
- PR = Protected ranking
- SR = Special ranking
- SE = Special exempt
- JE = Junior exempt
- JR = Junior Accelerator Programme entrant
- CO = College Accelerator Programme entrant
- NG = Next Gen Accelerator Program entrant
- w/o = Walkover
- r = Retired
- d = Defaulted

First round
1	(France) A Fusai (France) N Tauziat	5	3
(Austria) **B Schett** (Romania) **I Spîrlea**	**7**	**6**
WC	(Czech Republic) S Kleinová (Luxembourg) A Kremer	3	3
(Germany) **C Singer** (Czech Republic) **H Vildová**	**6**	**6**
3	(Russia) **E Likhovtseva** (Japan) **A Sugiyama**	**6**	**7**
(South Africa) J Kruger (Spain) V Ruano Pascual	1	5
(Czech Republic) **E Melicharová** (Germany) **C Schneider**	**6**	1	**6**
(Poland) M Grzybowska (Slovakia) H Nagyová	0	**6**	4
(Russia) E Kulikovskaya (France) S Pitkowski	2	1
(Zimbabwe) **C Black** (Kazakhstan) **I Selyutina**	**6**	**6**
(Austria) K Kschwendt (France) A-G Sidot	**7**	2	3
4	(Belgium) **S Appelmans** (Netherlands) **M Oremans**	5	**6**	**6**
(South Africa) **A Coetzer** (Germany) **A Huber**	**7**	6	**6**
(Romania) R Dragomir (Croatia) I Majoli	5	**7**	2
Q	(Austria) S Plischke (Austria) P Wartusch	2	**6**	4
2	(Latvia) **L Neiland** (Ukraine) **E Tatarkova**	**6**	4	**6**

Quarterfinals
(Austria) **B Schett** (Romania) **I Spîrlea**	**6**	**6**
(Germany) C Singer (Czech Republic) H Vildová	4	4
3	(Russia) **E Likhovtseva** (Japan) **A Sugiyama**	**6**	**6**
(Czech Republic) E Melicharová (Germany) C Schneider	1	2
(Zimbabwe) **C Black** (Kazakhstan) **I Selyutina**	3	**6**	**7**
4	(Belgium) S Appelmans (Netherlands) M Oremans	**6**	3	5
(South Africa) A Coetzer (Germany) A Huber	4	3
2	(Latvia) **L Neiland** (Ukraine) **E Tatarkova**	**6**	**6**

Semifinals
(Austria) B Schett (Romania) I Spîrlea	**7**	5	3
3	(Russia) **E Likhovtseva** (Japan) **A Sugiyama**	5	**7**	**6**
(Zimbabwe) C Black (Kazakhstan) I Selyutina	6^{2}	3
2	(Latvia) **L Neiland** (Ukraine) **E Tatarkova**	**7^{7}**	**6**

Final
3	(Russia) **Elena Likhovtseva** (Japan) **Ai Sugiyama**	6^{3}	**6**	**2**
2	(Latvia) Larisa Neiland (Ukraine) Elena Tatarkova	**7^{7}**	3	0^{r}
