= Luxembourg Open =

WTA Tour tennis tournament

BGL Luxembourg Open

Defunct tennis tournament
- Founded: 1991; 34 years ago
- Abolished: 2021
- Location: Kockelscheuer; Luxembourg
- Venue: Kockelscheuer Sport Centre
- Category: WTA 250
- Surface: Hard (indoor)
- Draw: 30S / 24Q / 16D
- Prize money: US$235,238 (2021)
- Website: bglbnpparibas-open.com

Current champions (2021)
- Women's singles: (Denmark) Clara Tauson
- Women's doubles: (Belgium) Greet Minnen (Belgium) Alison Van Uytvanck

The Luxembourg Open, last sponsored by BGL, was a women's tennis tournament held in Kockelscheuer, Luxembourg. Held since 1991, the tournament was an exhibition event (winners including Novotná, Navratilova and Appelmans) until 1995. After that, it became a WTA Tier III tournament, which it remained until 2004. In 2005, it was promoted to Tier II, marking the first such event to be held in Luxembourg. In 2008, the tournament was relegated to a Tier III event, before it became an International Series tournament in 2009.

Kim Clijsters of Belgium holds the record of most singles wins: 5 (1999, 2001, 2002, 2003, 2005). No other player has won more than twice.

== Past finals ==
=== Singles ===
Year	Champions	Runners-up	Score
↓ Exhibition tournament ↓
1991	(Czech Republic) Jana Novotná	(Austria) Judith Wiesner	Not known
1992	(Czech Republic) Jana Novotná (2)	(Georgia (country)) Leila Meskhi	Not known
1993	(United States) Martina Navratilova	(United States) Mary Joe Fernandez	Not known
1994	(United States) Martina Navratilova (2)	(Spain) Arantxa Sánchez	Not known
1995	(Belgium) Sabine Appelmans	(France) Mary Pierce	Not known
↓ Tier III tournament ↓
1996	(Germany) Anke Huber	(Slovakia) Karina Habšudová	6–3, 6–0
1997	(South Africa) Amanda Coetzer	(Austria) Barbara Paulus	6–4, 3–6, 7–5
1998	(France) Mary Pierce	(Italy) Silvia Farina Elia	6–0, 2–0, retired
1999	(Belgium) Kim Clijsters	(Belgium) Dominique Van Roost	6–2, 6–2
2000	(United States) Jennifer Capriati	(Bulgaria) Magdalena Maleeva	4–6, 6–1, 6–4
2001	(Belgium) Kim Clijsters (2)	(United States) Lisa Raymond	6–2, 6–2
2002	(Belgium) Kim Clijsters (3)	(Bulgaria) Magdalena Maleeva	6–1, 6–2
2003	(Belgium) Kim Clijsters (4)	(United States) Chanda Rubin	6–2, 7–5
2004	(Australia) Alicia Molik	(Russia) Dinara Safina	6–3, 6–4
↓ Tier II tournament ↓
2005	(Belgium) Kim Clijsters (5)	(Germany) Anna-Lena Grönefeld	6–2, 6–4
2006	(Ukraine) Alona Bondarenko	(Italy) Francesca Schiavone	6–3, 6–2
2007	(Serbia) Ana Ivanovic	(Slovakia) Daniela Hantuchová	3–6, 6–4, 6–4
↓ Tier III tournament ↓
2008	(Russia) Elena Dementieva	(Denmark) Caroline Wozniacki	2–6, 6–4, 7–6^{(7–4)}
↓ International tournament ↓
2009	(Switzerland) Timea Bacsinszky	(Germany) Sabine Lisicki	6–2, 7–5
2010	(Italy) Roberta Vinci	(Germany) Julia Görges	6–3, 6–4
2011	(Belarus) Victoria Azarenka	(Romania) Monica Niculescu	6–2, 6–2
2012	(United States) Venus Williams	(Romania) Monica Niculescu	6–2, 6–3
2013	(Denmark) Caroline Wozniacki	(Germany) Annika Beck	6–2, 6–2
2014	(Germany) Annika Beck	(Czech Republic) Barbora Záhlavová-Strýcová	6–2, 6–1
2015	(Japan) Misaki Doi	(Germany) Mona Barthel	6–4, 6–7^{(7–9)}, 6–0
2016	(Romania) Monica Niculescu	(Czech Republic) Petra Kvitová	6–4, 6–0
2017	(Germany) Carina Witthöft	(Puerto Rico) Monica Puig	6–3, 7–5
2018	(Germany) Julia Görges	(Switzerland) Belinda Bencic	6–4, 7–5
2019	(Latvia) Jeļena Ostapenko	(Germany) Julia Görges	6–4, 6–1
2020	Not held due to the COVID-19 pandemic		
2021	(Denmark) Clara Tauson	(Latvia) Jeļena Ostapenko	6–3, 4–6, 6–4

=== Doubles ===
Year	Champions	Runners-up	Score
↓ Tier III tournament ↓
1996	(Netherlands) Kristie Boogert (France) Nathalie Tauziat	(Germany) Barbara Rittner (Belgium) Dominique Van Roost	2–6, 6–4, 6–2
1997	(Latvia) Larisa Neiland (Czech Republic) Helena Suková	(Germany) Meike Babel (Belgium) Laurence Courtois	6–2, 6–4
1998	(Russia) Elena Likhovtseva (Japan) Ai Sugiyama	(Latvia) Larisa Neiland (Ukraine) Elena Tatarkova	6–7, 6–3, 2–0 ret.
1999	(Romania) Irina Spîrlea (Netherlands) Caroline Vis	(Slovenia) Tina Križan (Slovenia) Katarina Srebotnik	6–1, 6–2
2000	(France) Alexandra Fusai (France) Nathalie Tauziat (2)	(Bulgaria) Lubomira Bacheva (Spain) Cristina Torrens Valero	6–3, 7–6^{(7–0)}
2001	(Russia) Elena Bovina (Slovakia) Daniela Hantuchová	(Germany) Bianka Lamade (Switzerland) Patty Schnyder	6–3 6–3
2002	(Belgium) Kim Clijsters (Slovakia) Janette Husárová	(Czech Republic) Květa Hrdličková (Germany) Barbara Rittner	4–6, 6–3, 7–5
2003	(Russia) Maria Sharapova (Thailand) Tamarine Tanasugarn	(Ukraine) Elena Tatarkova (Germany) Marlene Weingärtner	6–1, 6–4
2004	(Spain) Virginia Ruano (Argentina) Paola Suárez	(United States) Jill Craybas (Germany) Marlene Weingärtner	6–1, 6–7, 6–3
↓ Tier II tournament ↓
2005	(United States) Lisa Raymond (Australia) Samantha Stosur	(Zimbabwe) Cara Black (Australia) Rennae Stubbs	6–7, 7–5, 6–4
2006	(Czech Republic) Květa Peschke (Italy) Francesca Schiavone	(Germany) Anna-Lena Grönefeld (South Africa) Liezel Huber	2–6, 6–4, 6–1
2007	(Czech Republic) Iveta Benešová (Slovakia) Janette Husárová (2)	(Belarus) Victoria Azarenka (Israel) Shahar Pe'er	6–4, 6–2
↓ Tier III tournament ↓
2008	(Romania) Sorana Cîrstea (New Zealand) Marina Erakovic	(Russia) Vera Dushevina (Ukraine) Mariya Koryttseva	2–6, 6–3, [10–8]
↓ International tournament ↓
2009	(Czech Republic) Iveta Benešová (2) (Czech Republic) Barbora Záhlavová-Strýcová	(Czech Republic) Vladimíra Uhlířová (Czech Republic) Renata Voráčová	1–6, 6–0, [10–7]
2010	(Switzerland) Timea Bacsinszky (Italy) Tathiana Garbin	(Czech Republic) Iveta Benešová (Czech Republic) Barbora Záhlavová-Strýcová	6–4, 6–4
2011	(Czech Republic) Iveta Benešová (3) (Czech Republic) Barbora Záhlavová-Strýcová (2)	(Czech Republic) Lucie Hradecká (Russia) Ekaterina Makarova	7–5, 6–3
2012	(Czech Republic) Andrea Hlaváčková (Czech Republic) Lucie Hradecká	(Romania) Irina-Camelia Begu (Romania) Monica Niculescu	6–3, 6–4
2013	(Liechtenstein) Stephanie Vogt (Belgium) Yanina Wickmayer	(Germany) Kristina Barrois (France) Laura Thorpe	7–6^{(7–2)}, 6–4
2014	(Switzerland) Timea Bacsinszky (2) (Germany) Kristina Barrois	(Czech Republic) Lucie Hradecká (Czech Republic) Barbora Krejčíková	3–6, 6–4, [10–4]
2015	(Germany) Mona Barthel (Germany) Laura Siegemund	(Spain) Anabel Medina Garrigues (Spain) Arantxa Parra Santonja	6–2, 7–6^{(7–2)}
2016	(Netherlands) Kiki Bertens (Sweden) Johanna Larsson	(Romania) Monica Niculescu (Romania) Patricia Maria Țig	4–6, 7–5, [11–9]
2017	(Netherlands) Lesley Kerkhove (Belarus) Lidziya Marozava	(Canada) Eugenie Bouchard (Belgium) Kirsten Flipkens	6–7^{(4–7)}, 6–4, [10–6]
2018	(Belgium) Greet Minnen (Belgium) Alison Van Uytvanck	(Belarus) Vera Lapko (Luxembourg) Mandy Minella	7–6^{(7–3)}, 6–2
2019	(United States) Coco Gauff (United States) Caty McNally	(United States) Kaitlyn Christian (Chile) Alexa Guarachi	6–2, 6–2
2020	Not held due to the COVID-19 pandemic		
2021	(Belgium) Greet Minnen (2) (Belgium) Alison Van Uytvanck (2)	(New Zealand) Erin Routliffe (Belgium) Kimberley Zimmermann	6–3, 6–3

== See also ==
- List of tennis tournaments
