= Kockelscheuer =

Town in Luxembourg

Coordinates: 49°34′N 6°07′E

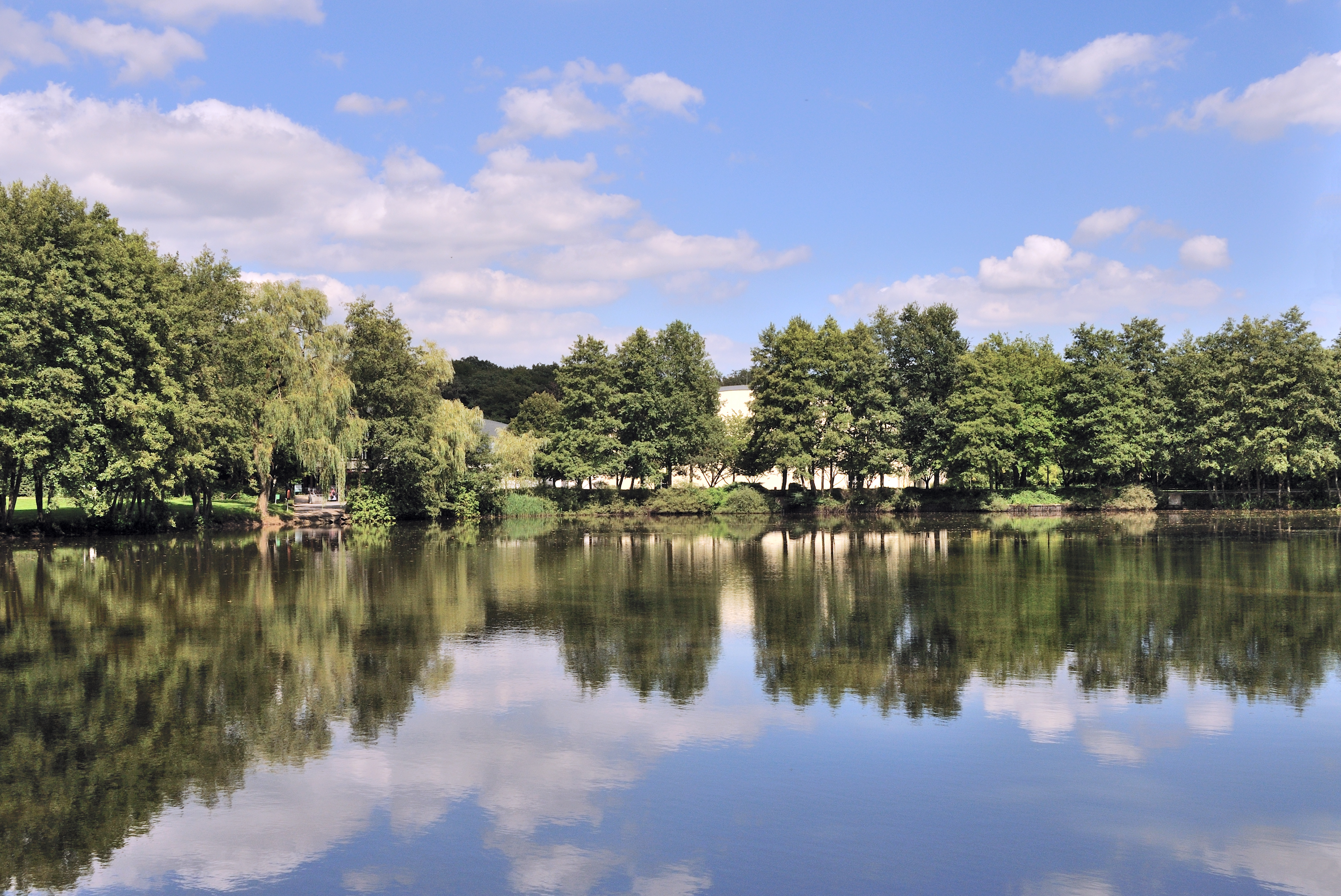
Luxembourg Kockelscheuer: pond close to the ice rink and the public parking.

Kockelscheuer (German pronunciation: [ˈkɔkl̩ˌʃɔʏɐ]; Luxembourgish: Kockelscheier) is a small town in the commune of Roeser, in southern Luxembourg. As of September 2026, the town has a population of 264. The Fortis Championships Luxembourg are held at the Kockelscheuer Sport Centre, just to the north of the town. The 2014 IIHF World Championship Division III were held at the Kockelscheuer Ice Rink in April 2014. Each year Kockelscheuer held sponsored by BGL a tennis tournament, part of WTA.
