= Eugenie Bouchard career statistics =

Career finals
Discipline	Type	Won	Lost	Total
Singles	Grand Slam	–	1	1
Singles	WTA Finals	–	–	–
Singles	Premier M/5	–	1	1
Singles	WTA Tour	1	5	6
Singles	Olympics	–	–	–
Singles	Total	1	7	8
Doubles	Grand Slam	–	–	–
Doubles	WTA Finals	–	–	–
Doubles	Premier M/5	–	–	–
Doubles	WTA Tour	1	4	5
Doubles	Olympics	–	–	–
Doubles	Total	1	4	5

This is a list of the main career statistics of former professional Canadian tennis player, Eugenie Bouchard. Bouchard has won one WTA singles title at the 2014 Nuremberg Cup. Other highlights of Bouchard's career thus far include a runner-up finish at the 2014 Wimbledon Championships, semifinal appearances at the 2014 Australian Open and 2014 French Open and a quarterfinal run at the 2015 Australian Open. Bouchard achieved a career-high singles ranking of world No. 5 on October 20, 2014.

== Career achievements ==
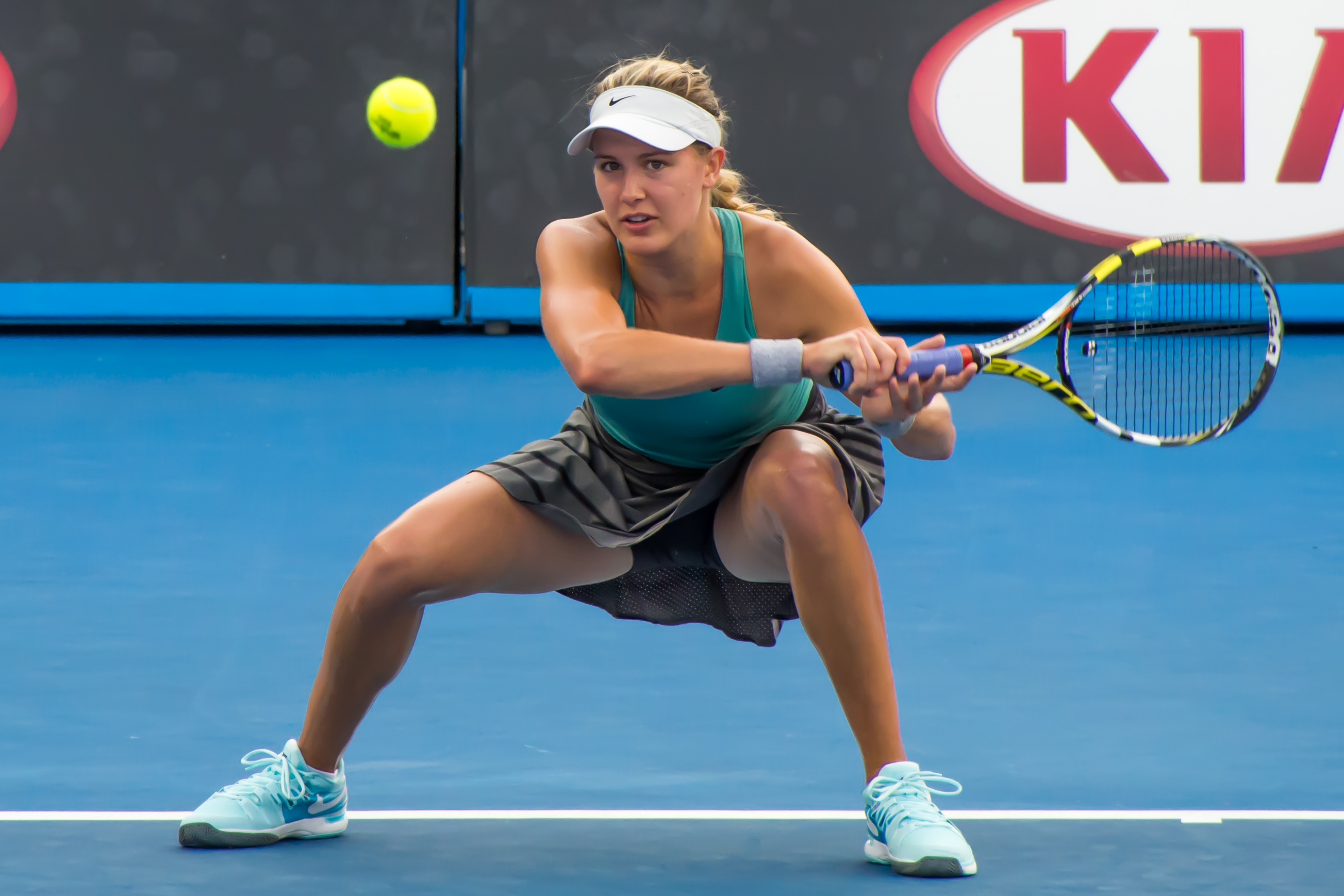
Bouchard reached her first Grand Slam semifinal at the 2014 Australian Open.

Bouchard advanced to her first career singles final at the 2013 HP Open following a straight sets victory over Kurumi Nara, but lost to former US Open champion Samantha Stosur in three sets in the championship match. The following year, Bouchard reached her first Grand Slam semifinal at the Australian Open, defeating former world No. 1 Ana Ivanovic (who had upset the reigning world No. 1 and heavy favourite, Serena Williams) en route before losing in straight sets to the eventual champion, Li Na. During the clay court season, Bouchard won her first WTA singles title at the Nuremberg Cup, defeating Karolína Plíšková in the final in three sets before reaching her second consecutive major semifinal at the French Open, where she lost in three sets to the eventual champion, Maria Sharapova. In July, Bouchard became the first Canadian player to reach a Grand Slam final in singles when she defeated world No. 3, Simona Halep, in the semifinals of the Wimbledon Championships. However, she lost in the final to sixth seed and 2011 champion, Petra Kvitová. In September, Bouchard reached her first WTA Premier 5 final at the Wuhan Open, but was again defeated by Kvitová.

== Performance timelines ==
Key
W	F	SF	QF	#R	RR	Q#	P#	DNQ	A	Z#	PO	G	S	B	NMS	NTI	P	NH

(W) winner; (F) finalist; (SF) semifinalist; (QF) quarterfinalist; (#R) rounds 4, 3, 2, 1; (RR) round-robin stage; (Q#) qualification round; (P#) preliminary round; (DNQ) did not qualify; (A) absent; (Z#) Davis/Fed Cup Zonal Group (with number indication) or (PO) play-off; (G) gold, (S) silver or (B) bronze Olympic/Paralympic medal; (NMS) not a Masters tournament; (NTI) not a Tier I tournament; (P) postponed; (NH) not held; (SR) strike rate (events won / competed); (W–L) win–loss record.
To avoid confusion and double counting, these charts are updated at the conclusion of a tournament or when the player's participation has ended.

=== Singles ===
Tournament	2008	2009	2010	2011	2012	2013	2014	2015	2016	2017	2018	2019	2020	2021	2022	2023	2024	2025	SR	W–L	Win %
Grand Slam tournaments
Australian Open	A	A	A	A	A	Q2	SF	QF	2R	3R	2R	2R	Q3	Q2	A	Q1	A	A	0 / 6	14–6	70%
French Open	A	A	A	A	A	2R	SF	1R	2R	2R	Q1	1R	3R	A	A	A	A	A	0 / 7	10–7	59%
Wimbledon	A	A	A	A	A	3R	F	1R	3R	1R	2R	1R	NH	A	A	Q1	A	A	0 / 7	11–7	61%
US Open	A	A	A	A	A	2R	4R	4R^{[1]}	1R	1R	2R	1R	A	A	Q2	Q2	A	A	0 / 7	8–6	57%
Win–loss	0–0	0–0	0–0	0–0	0–0	4–3	19–4	7–3	4–4	3–4	3–3	1–4	2–1	0–0	0–0	0–0	0–0	0–0	0 / 27	43–26	62%
Year-end championships
WTA Finals	DNQ						RR	DNQ					NH	DNQ					0 / 1	0–3	0%
National representation
Summer Olympics	A	NH			A	NH			2R	NH				A	NH		A	NH	0 / 1	1–1	50%
Billie Jean King Cup	A	A	A	G2	A	G2	PO	PO	A	A	G2	A	A	A	A	W	A	A	1 / 1	12–4	75%
WTA 1000 tournaments
Qatar / Dubai Open^{[2]}	A	A	A	A	A	A	1R	A	3R	A	A	2R	A	A	A	A	A	A	0 / 3	3–3	50%
Indian Wells Open	A	A	A	A	A	Q1	4R	4R	3R	1R	1R	1R	NH	A	A	A	A	A	0 / 6	6–6	50%
Miami Open	A	A	A	A	A	2R	2R	2R	1R	1R	Q2	Q1	NH	A	A	A	A	A	0 / 5	1–5	17%
Madrid Open	NH	A	A	A	A	A	1R	1R	1R	QF	A	A	NH	A	A	2R	A	A	0 / 5	4–5	44%
Italian Open	A	A	A	A	A	A	1R	3R	3R	A	A	A	A	A	A	Q1	A	A	0 / 3	3–3	50%
Canadian Open	Q1	Q1	Q1	1R	2R	2R	2R	1R	3R	1R	1R	1R	NH	A	A	Q1	Q1	2R	0 / 10	5–10	33%
Cincinnati Open	NMS	A	A	A	A	2R	2R	2R	1R	A	A	A	A	A	A	A	A	A	0 / 4	2–4	33%
Guadalajara Open	NH														2R	2R	A	A	0 / 2	2–2	50%
Pan Pac. / Wuhan Open^{[3]}	A	A	A	A	A	QF	F	A	A	A	A	A	NH				A	A	0 / 2	7–2	78%
China Open	NMS	A	A	A	A	2R	2R	1R	A	1R	A	A	NH			A	A	A	0 / 4	1–4	20%
Win–loss	0–0	0–0	0–0	0–1	1–1	7–5	6–9	4–7	8–7	3–5	0–2	1–3	0–0	0–0	1–1	2–2	0–0	1–1	0 / 44	34–44	44%
Career statistics^{[4]}
	2008	2009	2010	2011	2012	2013	2014	2015	2016	2017	2018	2019	2020	2021	2022	2023	2024	2025	SR	W–L	Win%
Tournaments	0	0	0	3	4	17	22	17	24	20	13	10	4	3	5	3	0	1	Career total: 146		
Titles	0	0	0	0	0	0	1	0	0	0	0	0	0	0	0	0	0	0	Career total: 1		
Finals	0	0	0	0	0	1	3	0	2	0	0	0	1	1	0	0	0	0	Career total: 8		
Hard win–loss	0–0	0–0	0–0	1–2	4–3	12–10	18–15	10–8	19–15	7–14	7–10	4–7	2–1	4–3	3–5	1–1	0–0	1–1	0 / 95	93–95	49%
Clay win–loss	0–0	0–0	0–0	0–0	0–0	8–4	15–5	1–4	4–4	4–3	3–2	0–2	8–3	0–0	0–0	2–2	0–0	0–0	1 / 30	45–29	61%
Grass win–loss	0–0	0–0	0–0	0–0	0–0	2–2	6–2	1–4	5–4	0–3	1–1	0–1	0–0	0–0	0–0	0–0	0–0	0–0	0 / 17	15–17	47%
Carpet win–loss	0–0	0–0	0–0	0–1	1–1	3–1	0–0	0–0	1–1	0–0	0–0	discontinued							0 / 4	5–4	56%
Overall win–loss	0–0	0–0	0–0	1–3	5–4	25–17	39–22	12–16	29–24	11–20	11–13	4–10	10–4	4–3	3–5	3–3	0–0	1–1	1 / 146	158–145	52%
Win %	–	–	–	25%	56%	60%	64%	43%	55%	35%	46%	29%	71%	57%	38%	50%	–	50%	Career total: 52%		
Year-end ranking	1104	1068	538	302	144	32	7	48	47	81	89	224	141	246	323	273	1007		$6,920,932		

Notes

- ^{^{1}} Bouchard's 2015 US Open withdrawal in the fourth round does not count as a loss.
- ^{^{2}} The first Premier 5 event of the year has switched back and forth between the Qatar Ladies Open and the Dubai Tennis Championships since 2009. Dubai was classified as a Premier 5 event from 2009 to 2011 before being succeeded by Doha for the 2012–2014 period. Since 2015, the two tournaments alternate between Premier 5 and Premier status every year.
- ^{^{3}} In 2014, the Pan Pacific Open was downgraded to a Premier event and replaced by the Wuhan Open.
- ^{^{4}} Only WTA Tour main draw (incl. major tournaments) and Olympics results are considered.

=== Doubles ===
Tournament	2012	2013	2014	2015	2016	2017	2018	2019	2020	2021	2022	2023	2024	2025	SR	W–L	Win %
Grand Slam tournaments
Australian Open	A	A	3R	A	A	A	1R	A	A	A	A	A	A	A	0 / 2	2–2	50%
French Open	A	A	A	A	A	A	A	A	A	A	A	A	A	A	0 / 0	0–0	–
Wimbledon	A	3R	1R	A	1R	A	Q1	A	NH	A	A	A	A	A	0 / 3	2–3	40%
US Open	A	1R	A	2R	A	1R	A	A	A	A	A	A	A	A	0 / 3	1–2	33%
Win–loss	0–0	2–2	2–2	1–0	0–1	0–1	0–1	0–0	0–0	0–0	0–0	0–0	0–0	0–0	0 / 8	5–7	42%
National representation
Summer Olympics	A	NH			2R	NH				A	NH		A	NH	0 / 1	1–1	50%
Billie Jean King Cup	PO	G2	PO	PO	A	A	G2	A	A	A	A	W	A	A	1 / 1	3–0	100%
WTA 1000 tournaments
Qatar / Dubai Open^{[2]}	A	A	A	A	A	A	A	2R	A	A	A	A	A	A	0 / 1	1–0	100%
Indian Wells Open	A	A	A	A	A	A	1R	1R	NH	A	A	A	A	A	0 / 2	0–2	0%
Miami Open	A	A	A	A	A	A	1R	A	NH	A	A	A	A	A	0 / 1	0–1	0%
Canadian Open	1R	1R	A	A	1R	2R	QF	1R	NH	A	A	1R	A	A	0 / 7	3–7	30%
Guadalajara Open	NH										A	1R	A	A	0 / 1	0–1	0%
Win–loss	0–1	0–1	0–0	0–0	0–1	1–1	2–3	1–2	0–0	0–0	0–0	0–2	0–0	0–0	0 / 12	4–11	27%
Career statistics
Titles	0	0	0	0	0	0	0	1	0	0	0	0	0	0	Career total: 1		
Finals	0	1	0	0	0	2	0	1	0	1	0	0	0	0	Career total: 5		
Year-end ranking	191	132	230	365	1039	112	305	192	803	344	458	–	1270				

=== Mixed doubles ===
Tournament	2013	2014	2015	2016	2017	2018	2019	2020	2021	2022	2023	2024	2025	SR	W–L	Win %
Australian Open	A	A	A	A	A	A	A	A	A	A	A	A	A	0 / 0	0–0	–
French Open	A	A	1R	A	A	A	A	NH	A	A	A	A	A	0 / 1	0–1	0%
Wimbledon	1R	A	A	A	A	A	A	NH	A	A	A	A	A	0 / 1	0–1	0%
US Open	A	A	2R	A	A	A	A	NH	A	A	A	A	A	0 / 1	1–0	100%
Win–loss	0–1	0–0	1–1	0–0	0–0	0–0	0–0	0–0	0–0	0–0	0–0	0–0	0–0	0 / 3	1–2	33%

== Grand Slam tournament finals ==
=== Singles: 1 (runner-up) ===
Result	Year	Tournament	Surface	Opponent	Score
Loss	2014	Wimbledon	Grass	(Czech Republic) Petra Kvitová	3–6, 0–6

== Other significant finals ==
=== WTA 1000 ===
==== Singles: 1 (runner-up) ====
Result	Year	Tournament	Surface	Opponent	Score
Loss	2014	Wuhan Open	Hard	(Czech Republic) Petra Kvitová	3–6, 4–6

== WTA Tour finals ==
=== Singles: 8 (1 title, 7 runner-ups) ===
Legend Grand Slam (0–1) Premier M & Premier 5 / WTA 1000 (0–1) Premier / WTA 500 (0–0) International / WTA 250 (1–5)	Finals by surface Hard (0–5) Grass (0–1) Clay (1–1) Carpet (0–0)

Result	W–L	Date	Tournament	Tier	Surface	Opponent	Score
Loss	0–1	Oct 2013	Japan Women's Open, Japan	International	Hard	(Australia) Samantha Stosur	6–3, 5–7, 2–6
Win	1–1	May 2014	Nuremberg Cup, Germany	International	Clay	(Czech Republic) Karolína Plíšková	6–2, 4–6, 6–3
Loss	1–2	Jul 2014	Wimbledon, UK	Grand Slam	Grass	(Czech Republic) Petra Kvitová	3–6, 0–6
Loss	1–3	Sep 2014	Wuhan Open, China	Premier 5	Hard	(Czech Republic) Petra Kvitová	3–6, 4–6
Loss	1–4	Jan 2016	Hobart International, Australia	International	Hard	(France) Alizé Cornet	1–6, 2–6
Loss	1–5	Mar 2016	Malaysian Open, Malaysia	International	Hard	(Ukraine) Elina Svitolina	7–6^{(7–5)}, 4–6, 5–7
Loss	1–6	Sep 2020	İstanbul Cup, Turkey	International	Clay	(Romania) Patricia Maria Țig	6–2, 1–6, 6–7^{(4–7)}
Loss	1–7	Mar 2021	Abierto Zapopan, Mexico	WTA 250	Hard	(Spain) Sara Sorribes Tormo	2–6, 5–7

=== Doubles: 5 (1 title, 4 runner-ups) ===
Legend Grand Slam (–) Premier M & Premier 5 / WTA 1000 (–) Premier / WTA 500 (–) International / WTA 250 (1–4)	Finals by surface Hard (1–4) Grass (0–0) Clay (0–0) Carpet (0–0)

Result	W–L	Date	Tournament	Tier	Surface	Partner	Opponents	Score
Loss	0–1	Aug 2013	Washington Open, US	International	Hard	(United States) Taylor Townsend	(Japan) Shuko Aoyama (Russia) Vera Dushevina	3–6, 3–6
Loss	0–2	Aug 2017	Washington Open, US	International	Hard	(United States) Sloane Stephens	(Japan) Shuko Aoyama (Czech Republic) Renata Voráčová	3–6, 2–6
Loss	0–3	Oct 2017	Luxembourg Open, Luxembourg	International	Hard (i)	(Belgium) Kirsten Flipkens	(Netherlands) Lesley Kerkhove (Belarus) Lidziya Marozava	7–6^{(7–4)}, 4–6, [6–10]
Win	1–3	Jan 2019	Auckland Open, New Zealand	International	Hard	(United States) Sofia Kenin	(New Zealand) Paige Mary Hourigan (United States) Taylor Townsend	1–6, 6–1, [10–7]
Loss	1–4	Mar 2021	Lyon Open, France	WTA 250	Hard (i)	(Serbia) Olga Danilović	(Slovakia) Viktória Kužmová (Netherlands) Arantxa Rus	6–3, 5–7, [7–10]

== Team competition finals ==
Result	Date	Tournament	Surface	Team	Partners	Opponent team	Opponent players	Score
Win	Nov 2023	Billie Jean King Cup	Hard (i)	Canada	Leylah Fernandez; Rebecca Marino; Marina Stakusic; Gabriela Dabrowski	Italy	Jasmine Paolini; Martina Trevisan; Elisabetta Cocciaretto; Lucia Bronzetti; Lucrezia Stefanini	2–0

== ITF Circuit finals ==
=== Singles: 7 (6 titles, 1 runner-up) ===
Legend
$50,000 tournaments (1–1)
$25,000 tournaments (2–0)
$10,000 tournaments (3–0)

Result	W–L	Date	Tournament	Tier	Surface	Opponent	Score
Win	1–0	Feb 2011	Burnie International, Australia	25,000	Hard	(China) Zheng Saisai	6–4, 6–3
Win	2–0	Apr 2011	ITF Šibenik, Croatia	10,000	Clay	(France) Jessica Ginier	6–2, 6–0
Win	3–0	May 2012	ITF Båstad, Sweden	10,000	Clay	(Germany) Katharina Lehnert	7–6^{(7–4)}, 6–0
Win	4–0	May 2012	ITF Båstad, Sweden	10,000	Clay	(Serbia) Milana Spremo	6–3, 6–0
Win	5–0	Jul 2012	Challenger de Granby, Canada	25,000	Hard	(Canada) Stéphanie Dubois	6–2, 5–2 ret.
Loss	5–1	Oct 2012	Challenger de Saguenay, Canada	50,000	Hard (i)	(United States) Madison Keys	4–6, 2–6
Win	6–1	Nov 2012	Toronto Challenger, Canada	50,000	Hard (i)	(Canada) Sharon Fichman	6–1, 6–2

=== Doubles: 4 (1 title, 3 runner-ups) ===
Legend
$75,000 tournaments (0–1)
$50,000 tournaments (1–2)

Result	W–L	Date	Tournament	Tier	Surface	Partner	Opponents	Score
Loss	0–1	Jul 2011	Waterloo Challenger, Canada	50,000	Clay	(United States) Megan Moulton-Levy	(United States) Alexandra Mueller (United States) Asia Muhammad	3–6, 6–3, [7–10]
Win	1–1	Apr 2012	Dothan Pro Classic, United States	50,000	Clay	(United States) Jessica Pegula	(Canada) Sharon Fichman (Canada) Marie-Ève Pelletier	6–4, 4–6, [10–5]
Loss	1–2	Nov 2012	Toronto Challenger, Canada	50,000	Hard (i)	(United States) Jessica Pegula	(Canada) Gabriela Dabrowski (Russia) Alla Kudryavtseva	2–6, 6–7^{(2–7)}
Loss	1–3	Nov 2012	Phoenix Tennis Classic, United States	75,000	Hard	(Norway) Ulrikke Eikeri	(United States) Jacqueline Cako (United States) Natalie Pluskota	3–6, 6–2, [4–10]

== Junior Grand Slam tournament finals ==
=== Singles: 1 (title) ===
Result	Year	Tournament	Surface	Opponent	Score
Win	2012	Wimbledon	Grass	(Ukraine) Elina Svitolina	6–2, 6–2

=== Doubles: 2 (2 titles) ===
Result	Year	Tournament	Surface	Partner	Opponents	Score
Win	2011	Wimbledon	Grass	(United States) Grace Min	(Netherlands) Demi Schuurs (China) Tang Haochen	5–7, 6–2, 7–5
Win	2012	Wimbledon	Grass	(United States) Taylor Townsend	(Switzerland) Belinda Bencic (Croatia) Ana Konjuh	6–4, 6–3

== Singles Grand Slam seedings ==
The tournaments won by Bouchard are in boldface, while italics indicates Bouchard was the runner-up.

Year	Australian Open	French Open	Wimbledon	US Open
2013	did not qualify	not seeded	not seeded	not seeded
2014	30	18	13	7
2015	7	6	12	25
2016	not seeded	not seeded	not seeded	not seeded
2017	not seeded	not seeded	not seeded	not seeded
2018	not seeded	did not qualify	qualifier	qualifier
2019	not seeded	not seeded	not seeded	not seeded
2020	did not qualify	wildcard	not held	did not play
2021	did not qualify	did not play	did not play	did not play
2022	did not play	did not play	did not play	did not qualify
2023	did not qualify	did not play	did not qualify	did not qualify

== Coaches ==
Summary of junior and professional coaches
Coach	Period of coaching		Bouchard's rank		
Coach	Start	End	Start	Peak	End
Nick Saviano (1/2)	2006	November 2014	n/a	5	7
Nathalie Tauziat	June 2011	October 2013	361–367	32	32
António van Grichen	June 2013	July 2013	67	56	56
Sam Sumyk	February 2015	August 2015	7	6	25
Thomas Högstedt (1/2)	October 2015	April 2016	38	37	46
Nick Saviano (2/2)	April 2016	December 2016	46	39	46
Cyril Saulnier	April 2016	December 2016	46	39	46
Thomas Högstedt (2/2)	December 2016	September 2017	46	43	87
Harold Solomon	December 2017	March 2018	82	82	114

== Career prize money ==
Annual and career earnings summary (singles and doubles)
	Titles			Earnings		
Year	Grand Slam	WTA	Total	US$	WTA rank	Ref
2010	0	0	0	4,125	n/a	
2011	0	0	0	12,858	n/a	
2012	0	0	0	64,695	n/a	
2013	0	0	0	415,742	61	
2014	0	1	1	3,220,929	7	
2015	0	0	0	883,113	36	
2016	0	0	0	545,033	64	
2017	0	0	0	562,340	61	
2018	0	0	0	77,405	66	
Career	0	1	1	5,793,926	79	

*as of January 29, 2018

== Head-to-head records ==
=== Wins over career-high top-10 players ===
Bouchard's record against players who have been ranked in the top 10. Active players are in boldface.

Player	Years	Record	Win%	Hard	Clay	Grass	Last match
Number 1 ranked players							
**(Czech Republic) Karolína Plíšková**	2013–14	2–0	100%	1–0	1–0	–	Won (6–2, 4–6, 6–3) at 2014 Nuremberg
(Serbia) Jelena Janković	2013–16	3–1	75%	1–0	–	2–1	Won (6–4, 2–6, 6–3) at 2016 Rome
(Germany) **Angelique Kerber**	2013–17	4–2	67%	0–2	3–0	1–0	Won (6–3, 5–0 ret.) at 2017 Madrid
(Serbia) Ana Ivanovic	2013–14	2–1	67%	1–1	1–0	–	Lost (1–6, 3–6) at 2014 WTA Finals
(United States) **Venus Williams**	2013–14	1–1	50%	0–1	1–0	–	Won (7–6^{(8–6)}, 2–6, 6–4) at 2014 Charleston
(Denmark) **Caroline Wozniacki**	2014–17	1–1	50%	1–1	–	–	Lost (1–6, 1–6) at 2017 Hong Kong
(Romania) Simona Halep	2014–19	1–4	20%	0–4	–	1–0	Lost (6–7^{(4–7)}, 4–6) at 2019 Dubai
(Russia) Maria Sharapova	2013–17	1–4	20%	0–2	1–2	–	Won (7–5, 2–6, 6–4) at 2017 Madrid
(Belarus) **Aryna Sabalenka**	2018	0–1	0%	0–1	–	–	Lost (4–6, 3–6) at 2018 Hobart
(Poland) **Iga Świątek**	2020	0–1	0%	–	0–1	–	Lost (3–6, 2–6) at 2020 French Open
(Australia) Ashleigh Barty	2017–18	0–2	0%	0–1	–	0–1	Lost (4–6, 5–7) at 2018 Wimbledon
(United States) Serena Williams	2013–19	0–3	0%	0–3	–	–	Lost (2–6, 2–6) at 2019 Australian Open
Number 2 ranked players							
**(Spain) Paula Badosa**	2018–20	1–1	50%	–	1–1	–	Won (6–3, 6–2) at 2020 Istanbul
(Russia) Svetlana Kuznetsova	2014–20	1–3	25%	0–1	1–2	–	Won (7–6^{(7–3)}, 6–7^{(5–7)}, 6–2) at 2020 Istanbul
(Estonia) Anett Kontaveit	2016	0–1	0%	0–1	–	–	Lost (6–7^{(5–7)}, 4–6) at 2016 Linz
(Russia) **Vera Zvonareva**	2023	0–1	0%	–	–	0–1	Lost (3–6, 7–5, 3–6) at 2023 Berlin
(China) Li Na	2012–14	0–2	0%	0–2	–	–	Lost (2–6, 4–6) at 2014 Australian Open
(Czech Republic) **Petra Kvitová**	2013–16	0–4	0%	0–3	–	0–1	Lost (3–6, 2–6) at 2016 New Haven
(Poland) Agnieszka Radwańska	2014–17	0–4	0%	0–2	0–1	0–1	Lost (3–6, 5–7) at 2017 New Haven
Number 3 ranked players							
(United States) **Sloane Stephens**	2012–16	3–2	60%	3–2	–	–	Won (6–3, 6–3) at 2016 Olympics
(Ukraine) **Elina Svitolina**	2013–16	0–4	0%	0–3	0–1	–	Lost (7–6^{(7–5)}, 4–6, 5–7) at 2016 Kuala Lumpur
Number 4 ranked players							
(Netherlands) Kiki Bertens	2015	1–0	100%	1–0	–	–	Won (6–0, 6–3) at 2015 Australian Open
(Slovakia) Dominika Cibulková	2015–17	4–1	75%	4–0	–	0–1	Won (6–4, 6–3) at 2017 Sydney
(France) **Caroline Garcia**	2014–20	2–1	67%	2–1	–	–	Won (6–4, 6–4) at 2020 Auckland
(United Kingdom) Johanna Konta	2016–17	1–1	50%	0–1	–	1–0	Lost (2–6, 2–6) at 2017 Sydney
(Australia) Samantha Stosur	2013–14	1–2	33%	0–2	1–0	–	Lost (2–6, 2–6) at 2014 New Haven
(Canada) **Bianca Andreescu**	2019	0–2	0%	0–2	–	–	Lost (6–4, 1–6, 4–6) at 2019 Toronto
(Italy) Francesca Schiavone	2014–17	0–2	0%	–	0–1	0–1	Lost (7–6^{(7–5)}, 4–6, 3–6) at 2017 Mallorca
(Switzerland) **Belinda Bencic**	2015–22	0–3	0%	0–2	–	0–1	Lost (7–6^{(9–7)}, 1–6, 4–6) at 2022 Ostrava
Number 5 ranked players							
(Slovakia) Daniela Hantuchová	2014	1–0	100%	–	–	1–0	Won (7–5, 7–5) at 2014 Wimbledon
(Czech Republic) Lucie Šafářová	2013–16	1–1	50%	1–1	–	–	Won (6–3, 3–6, 7–6^{(7–3)}) at 2016 Montréal
(Italy) **Sara Errani**	2013–23	1–3	25%	1–0	0–3	–	Lost (3–6, 0–1 ret.) at 2023 Florence
(Latvia) **Jeļena Ostapenko**	2022	0–1	0%	0–1	–	–	Lost (5–7, 6–2, 1–6) at 2022 Guadalajara
Number 6 ranked players							
(Spain) Carla Suárez Navarro	2013–18	2–3	40%	1–0	1–1	0–2	Won (6–1, 6–0) at 2018 Luxembourg
**(Czech Republic) Markéta Vondroušová**	2018	0–1	0%	0–1	–	–	Lost (4–6, 3–6) at 2018 US Open
Number 7 ranked players							
(United States) **Danielle Collins**	2023	0–1	0%	0–1	–	–	Lost (1–6, 6–1, 1–6) at 2023 Montreal
(United States) **Madison Keys**	2012	0–1	0%	0–1	–	–	Lost (4–6, 2–6) at 2012 Saguenay
(Italy) Roberta Vinci	2015	0–1	0%	0–1	–	–	Lost (1–6, 0–6) at 2015 Connecticut Open
Number 8 ranked players							
(Czech Republic) **Karolína Muchová**	2018	1–0	100%	–	–	1–0	Won (6–2, 2–6, 6–3) at 2018 Wimbledon
(Russia) Ekaterina Makarova	2013–14	0–2	0%	0–2	–	–	Lost (6–7^{(2–7)}, 4–6) at 2014 US Open
Number 9 ranked players							
**(Russia) Veronika Kudermetova**	2018–23	2–1	67%	0–1	2–0	–	Lost (2–6, 7–6^{(7–4)}, 4–6) at 2023 Guadalajara
(United States) CoCo Vandeweghe	2015–17	1–1	50%	1–1	–	–	Lost (4–6, 6–3, 5–7) at 2017 Australian Open
(Switzerland) Timea Bacsinszky	2016–18	1–2	33%	0–1	1–1	–	Won (4–6, 7–6^{(6–1)}, 6–4) at 2018 Luxembourg
(Germany) Julia Görges	2014–19	1–2	33%	0–2	1–0	–	Lost (6–3, 3–6, 6–7^{(6–8)}) at 2019 Auckland
(Germany) Andrea Petkovic	2011–18	2–5	29%	1–4	0–1	1–0	Won (4–6, 4–0 ret.) at 2018 Luxembourg
Number 10 ranked players							
(France) **Kristina Mladenovic**	2013–15	1–2	33%	1–0	0–1	0–1	Lost (3–6, 6–4, 0–6) at 2015 Birmingham
**Total**	**2011–23**	**43–82**	**34%**	**20–55 (27%)**	**15–16 (48%)**	**8–11 (42%)**	**Last updated 11 November 2023.**

=== Wins over top-10 opponents ===
Bouchard has a 12–29 (29%) record against players who were, at the time the match was played, ranked in the top 10.

Season	2008	2009	2010	2011	2012	2013	2014	2015	2016	2017	2018	2019	2020	2021	2022	2023	Total
**Wins**	0	0	0	0	0	2	6	0	2	2	0	0	0	0	0	0	**12**

No.	Opponent	Rank	Event	Surface	Round	Score	EB Rank
**2013**
1.	(Australia) Samantha Stosur	9	Charleston Open, United States	Clay	3R	6–1, 2–0 ret.	114
2.	(Serbia) Jelena Janković	10	Pan Pacific Open, Japan	Hard	3R	7–5, 6–2	46
**2014**
3.	(Italy) Sara Errani	10	Indian Wells Open, United States	Hard	3R	6–3, 6–3	19
4.	(Serbia) Jelena Janković	8	Charleston Open, United States	Clay	QF	6–3, 4–6, 6–3	20
5.	(Germany) Angelique Kerber	9	French Open, France	Clay	4R	6–1, 6–2	16
6.	(Germany) Angelique Kerber	7	Wimbledon, UK	Grass	QF	6–3, 6–4	13
7.	(Romania) Simona Halep	3	Wimbledon, UK	Grass	SF	7–6^{(7–5)}, 6–2	13
8.	(Denmark) Caroline Wozniacki	7	Wuhan Open, China	Hard	SF	6–2, 6–3	9
**2016**
9.	(Germany) Angelique Kerber	2	Italian Open, Italy	Clay	2R	6–1, 5–7, 7–5	46
10.	(Slovakia) Dominika Cibulková	10	Canadian Open, Canada	Hard	2R	6–2, 6–0	42
**2017**
11.	(Slovakia) Dominika Cibulková	6	Sydney International, Australia	Hard	2R	6–4, 6–3	49
12.	(Germany) Angelique Kerber	2	Madrid Open, Spain	Clay	3R	6–3, 5–0 ret.	60
