= 2017 BGL Luxembourg Open =

- Date: 16–21 October
- Edition: 22nd
- Category: WTA International
- Draw: 32S / 16D
- Prize money: $250,000
- Surface: Hard (indoor)
- Location: Kockelscheuer, Luxembourg

Champions

Singles
- (Germany) Carina Witthöft

Doubles
- (Netherlands) Lesley Kerkhove / (Belarus) Lidziya Marozava
← 2016 ·	Luxembourg Open	· 2018 →

The 2017 BGL BNP Paribas Luxembourg Open was a women's tennis tournament played on indoor hard courts sponsored by BNP Paribas. It was the 22nd edition of the Luxembourg Open, and part of the WTA International tournaments category of the 2017 WTA Tour. It was held in Kockelscheuer, Luxembourg, on 16 October until 21 October 2017. Unseeded Carina Witthöft won the singles title.

== Finals ==
=== Singles ===
(Germany) Carina Witthöft defeated (Puerto Rico) Monica Puig, 6–3, 7–5

- It was Witthöft's only WTA singles title of her career.

=== Doubles ===
(Netherlands) Lesley Kerkhove / (Belarus) Lidziya Marozava defeated (Canada) Eugenie Bouchard / (Belgium) Kirsten Flipkens, 6–7^{(4–7)}, 6–4, [10–6]

== Points and prize money ==
=== Point distribution ===
Event	W	F	SF	QF	Round of 16	Round of 32	Q	Q3	Q2	Q1
Singles	280	180	110	60	30	1	18	14	10	1
Doubles	280	180	110	60	1	—	—	—	—	—

=== Prize money ===
Event	W	F	SF	QF	Round of 16	Round of 32^{1}	Q3	Q2	Q1
Singles	€34,677	€17,258	€9,113	€4,758	€2,669	€1,552	€810	€589	€427
Doubles *	€9,919	€5,161	€2,770	€1,468	€774	—	—	—	—

_{^{1} Qualifiers prize money is also the Round of 32 prize money}
_{* per team}

== Singles entrants ==
=== Seeds ===
Country	Player	Rank^{1}	Seed
GER	Angelique Kerber	12	1
NED	Kiki Bertens	30	2
EST	Anett Kontaveit	35	3
ROU	Sorana Cîrstea	37	4
BEL	Elise Mertens	38	5
GER	Tatjana Maria	52	6
BRA	Beatriz Haddad Maia	58	7
USA	Varvara Lepchenko	60	8

- Rankings as of 9 October 2017

=== Other entrants ===
The following players received wildcards into the singles main draw:

- (Germany) Angelique Kerber
- (Germany) Sabine Lisicki
- (Germany) Andrea Petkovic

The following player received entry as a special exempt:

- (Romania) Mihaela Buzărnescu

The following player received entry using a protected ranking into the singles main draw:

- (Croatia) Ajla Tomljanović

The following players received entry from the qualifying draw:

- (Croatia) Jana Fett
- (France) Pauline Parmentier
- (Belgium) Alison Van Uytvanck
- (Belgium) Yanina Wickmayer

The following player received entry as a lucky loser:

- (United Kingdom) Naomi Broady

=== Withdrawals ===
Before the tournament

- (France) Océane Dodin → replaced by (Croatia) Petra Martić
- (Italy) Camila Giorgi → replaced by (United Kingdom) Naomi Broady
- (Poland) Magda Linette → replaced by (Slovakia) Jana Čepelová
- (Czech Republic) Lucie Šafářová → replaced by (United States) Madison Brengle
- (Czech Republic) Barbora Strýcová → replaced by (Russia) Evgeniya Rodina
- (Italy) Roberta Vinci → replaced by (Canada) Eugenie Bouchard
- (Czech Republic) Markéta Vondroušová → replaced by (Spain) Sara Sorribes Tormo

=== Retirements ===
- (Romania) Sorana Cîrstea
- (Germany) Andrea Petkovic

== Doubles entrants ==
=== Seeds ===
Country	Player	Country	Player	Rank^{1}	Seed
~~NED~~	~~Kiki Bertens~~	~~SWE~~	~~Johanna Larsson~~	~~49~~	~~1~~
JPN	Shuko Aoyama	CHN	Yang Zhaoxuan	59	2
BEL	Elise Mertens	NED	Demi Schuurs	79	3
SUI	Viktorija Golubic	CRO	Darija Jurak	115	4

- ^{1} Rankings as of 9 October 2017

=== Other entrants ===
The following pair received a wildcard into the doubles main draw:

- (Germany) Anna-Lena Friedsam / (Germany) Antonia Lottner

=== Withdrawals ===
Before the tournament

- (Spain) Lara Arruabarrena
- (Netherlands) Kiki Bertens
