= 2017 BGL Luxembourg Open – Doubles =

Doubles
- 2017 BGL Luxembourg Open

Final
- Champions: (Netherlands) Lesley Kerkhove (Belarus) Lidziya Marozava
- Runners-up: (Canada) Eugenie Bouchard (Belgium) Kirsten Flipkens
- Score: 6–7^{(4–7)}, 6–4, [10–6]

Details
- Draw: 16
- Seeds: 4

Events
Singles	Doubles
← 2016 ·	BGL Luxembourg Open	· 2018 →

Kiki Bertens and Johanna Larsson were the defending champions, but withdrew from their first round match.

Lesley Kerkhove and Lidziya Marozava won the title, defeating Eugenie Bouchard and Kirsten Flipkens in the final, 6–7^{(4–7)}, 6–4, [10–6].

== Seeds ==
1. (Netherlands) Kiki Bertens / (Sweden) Johanna Larsson (withdrew)
2. (Japan) Shuko Aoyama / (China) Yang Zhaoxuan (first round)
3. (Belgium) Elise Mertens / (Netherlands) Demi Schuurs (first round)
4. (Switzerland) Viktorija Golubic / (Croatia) Darija Jurak (quarterfinals)

== Draw ==
Key

- Q = Qualifier
- WC = Wild card
- LL = Lucky loser
- Alt = Alternate
- ITF = ITF entry
- PR = Protected ranking
- SR = Special ranking
- SE = Special exempt
- JE = Junior exempt
- JR = Junior Accelerator Programme entrant
- CO = College Accelerator Programme entrant
- NG = Next Gen Accelerator Program entrant
- w/o = Walkover
- r = Retired
- d = Defaulted

=== Draw ===
First round
1	(Netherlands) K Bertens (Sweden) J Larsson
(United States) V Lepchenko (Hungary) F Stollár	w/o
(Paraguay) V Cepede Royg (Brazil) B Haddad Maia	7	6
(Romania) A Cadanțu (India) P Thombare	5	1
3	(Belgium) E Mertens (Netherlands) D Schuurs	3	7	[7]
(Russia) N Dzalamidze (Switzerland) X Knoll	6	5	[10]
(Netherlands) L Kerkhove (Belarus) L Marozava	6	6
(United States) M Brengle (Germany) N Geuer	2	1
(Canada) E Bouchard (Belgium) K Flipkens	6	6
(Argentina) M Irigoyen (Sweden) C Lister	1	0
(Spain) L Arruabarrena (Spain) S Sorribes Tormo
4	(Switzerland) V Golubic (Croatia) D Jurak	w/o
WC	(Germany) A-L Friedsam (Germany) A Lottner	6	2	[10]
(United Kingdom) N Broady (Czech Republic) E Hrdinová	2	6	[6]
(Romania) M Buzărnescu (Georgia (country)) O Kalashnikova	6	1	[10]
2	(Japan) S Aoyama (China) Z Yang	4	6	[7]

Quarterfinals
(United States) V Lepchenko (Hungary) F Stollár	6	3	[12]
(Paraguay) V Cepede Royg (Brazil) B Haddad Maia	3	6	[10]
(Russia) N Dzalamidze (Switzerland) X Knoll	6	2	[7]
(Netherlands) L Kerkhove (Belarus) L Marozava	4	6	[10]
(Canada) E Bouchard (Belgium) K Flipkens	6	6
4	(Switzerland) V Golubic (Croatia) D Jurak	2	3
WC	(Germany) A-L Friedsam (Germany) A Lottner	6	6
(Romania) M Buzărnescu (Georgia (country)) O Kalashnikova	3	4

Semifinals
(United States) V Lepchenko (Hungary) F Stollár	7^{7}	2	[8]
(Netherlands) L Kerkhove (Belarus) L Marozava	6^{2}	6	[10]
(Canada) E Bouchard (Belgium) K Flipkens	5	7	[10]
WC	(Germany) A-L Friedsam (Germany) A Lottner	7	5	[4]

Final
(Netherlands) L Kerkhove (Belarus) L Marozava	6^{4}	6	[10]
(Canada) E Bouchard (Belgium) K Flipkens	7^{7}	4	[6]
