= 2016 BGL Luxembourg Open =

- Date: 17–22 October
- Edition: 21st
- Category: WTA International
- Prize money: $250,000
- Surface: Hard (indoor)
- Location: Kockelscheuer, Luxembourg

Champions

Singles
- (Romania) Monica Niculescu

Doubles
- (Netherlands) Kiki Bertens / (Sweden) Johanna Larsson
← 2015 ·	Luxembourg Open	· 2017 →

The 2016 BGL BNP Paribas Luxembourg Open was a women's tennis tournament played on indoor hard courts sponsored by BNP Paribas. It was the 21st edition of the Luxembourg Open, and part of the WTA International tournaments category of the 2016 WTA Tour. It was held in Kockelscheuer, Luxembourg, on 17 October until 22 October 2016. Unseeded Monica Niculescu won the singles title.

== Finals ==
=== Singles ===
- (Romania) Monica Niculescu defeated (Czech Republic) Petra Kvitová, 6–4, 6–0

=== Doubles ===
- (Netherlands) Kiki Bertens / (Sweden) Johanna Larsson defeated (Romania) Monica Niculescu / (Romania) Patricia Maria Țig, 4–6, 7–5, [11–9]

== Points and prize money ==
=== Point distribution ===
Event	W	F	SF	QF	Round of 16	Round of 32	Q	Q3	Q2	Q1
Singles	280	180	110	60	30	1	18	14	10	1
Doubles	280	180	110	60	1	—	—	—	—	—

=== Prize money ===
Event	W	F	SF	QF	Round of 16	Round of 32^{1}	Q3	Q2	Q1
Singles	€34,677	€17,258	€9,113	€4,758	€2,669	€1,552	€810	€589	€427
Doubles *	€9,919	€5,161	€2,770	€1,468	€774	—	—	—	—

_{^{1} Qualifiers prize money is also the Round of 32 prize money}
_{* per team}

== Singles entrants ==
=== Seeds ===
Country	Player	Rank^{1}	Seed
CZE	Petra Kvitová	11	1
DEN	Caroline Wozniacki	22	2
NED	Kiki Bertens	23	3
FRA	Caroline Garcia	25	4
GER	Laura Siegemund	29	5
JPN	Misaki Doi	31	6
CAN	Eugenie Bouchard	45	7
SWE	Johanna Larsson	47	8

- Rankings as of 10 October 2016

=== Other entrants ===
The following players received wildcards into the singles main draw:

- (France) Océane Dodin
- (Luxembourg) Mandy Minella
- (Italy) Francesca Schiavone

The following players received entry from the qualifying draw:

- (United States) Lauren Davis
- (Czech Republic) Kristýna Plíšková
- (Czech Republic) Tereza Smitková
- (Germany) Carina Witthöft

=== Withdrawals ===
Before the tournament

- (Germany) Anna-Lena Friedsam → replaced by (Czech Republic) Denisa Allertová

During the tournament

- (Denmark) Caroline Wozniacki

== Doubles entrants ==
=== Seeds ===
Country	Player	Country	Player	Rank^{1}	Seed
USA	Raquel Atawo	USA	Abigail Spears	40	1
NED	Kiki Bertens	SWE	Johanna Larsson	84	2
GER	Anna-Lena Grönefeld	CZE	Květa Peschke	97	3
NED	Demi Schuurs	CZE	Renata Voráčová	142	4

- ^{1} Rankings as of 10 October 2016

=== Other entrants ===
The following pairs received wildcards into the doubles main draw:

- (United States) Julia Boserup / (Luxembourg) Mandy Minella
- (Chinese Taipei) Hsieh Shu-ying / (Chinese Taipei) Hsieh Su-wei
