= 2018 BGL Luxembourg Open – Doubles =

Doubles
- 2018 BGL Luxembourg Open

Final
- Champions: (Belgium) Greet Minnen (Belgium) Alison Van Uytvanck
- Runners-up: (Belarus) Vera Lapko (Luxembourg) Mandy Minella
- Score: 7–6^{(7–3)}, 6–2

Details
- Draw: 16
- Seeds: 4

Events
Singles	Doubles
← 2017 ·	BGL Luxembourg Open	· 2019 →

Lesley Kerkhove and Lidziya Marozava were the defending champions, but Kerkhove chose not to participate and Marozava chose to compete in Moscow instead.

Greet Minnen and Alison Van Uytvanck won the title, defeating Vera Lapko and Mandy Minella in the final, 7–6^{(7–3)}, 6–2.

== Seeds ==
1. (Ukraine) Lyudmyla Kichenok / (Slovenia) Katarina Srebotnik (quarterfinals)
2. (Belgium) Kirsten Flipkens / (Sweden) Johanna Larsson (semifinals, retired)
3. (Romania) Irina Bara / (Switzerland) Xenia Knoll (first round)
4. (Slovenia) Dalila Jakupović / (Czech Republic) Renata Voráčová (first round)

== Draw ==
Key

- Q = Qualifier
- WC = Wild card
- LL = Lucky loser
- Alt = Alternate
- ITF = ITF entry
- PR = Protected ranking
- SR = Special ranking
- SE = Special exempt
- JE = Junior exempt
- JR = Junior Accelerator Programme entrant
- CO = College Accelerator Programme entrant
- NG = Next Gen Accelerator Program entrant
- w/o = Walkover
- r = Retired
- d = Defaulted

=== Draw ===
First round
1	(Ukraine) L Kichenok (Slovenia) K Srebotnik	6	6
(Russia) A Blinkova (Netherlands) A Rus	2	2
(Russia) M Gasparyan (Romania) M Niculescu
WC	(Romania) R Șerban (Bulgaria) I Shinikova	w/o
3	(Romania) I Bara (Switzerland) X Knoll	7^{7}	3	[6]
(Belarus) V Lapko (Luxembourg) M Minella	6^{2}	6	[10]
(Sweden) C Lister (Netherlands) E Wacanno	7	3	[11]
(Uzbekistan) A Amanmuradova (Russia) E Yashina	5	6	[13]
(Germany) T Maria (France) P Parmentier	1	6	[12]
(Poland) P Kania (Russia) Y Sizikova	6	1	[14]
WC	(Belgium) G Minnen (Belgium) A Van Uytvanck	6^{7}	7^{7}	[10]
4	(Slovenia) D Jakupović (Czech Republic) R Voráčová	7^{9}	6^{2}	[5]
(Germany) N Geuer (Slovakia) C Škamlová	1	0
(Switzerland) V Golubic (United States) J Loeb	6	6
(Chinese Taipei) P-h Chen (Chinese Taipei) F-h Wu	6^{1}	2
2	(Belgium) K Flipkens (Sweden) J Larsson	7^{7}	6

Quarterfinals
1	(Ukraine) L Kichenok (Slovenia) K Srebotnik	1	4
WC	(Romania) R Șerban (Bulgaria) I Shinikova	6	6
(Belarus) V Lapko (Luxembourg) M Minella	6	6
(Uzbekistan) A Amanmuradova (Russia) E Yashina	3	2
(Poland) P Kania (Russia) Y Sizikova	6^{3}	1
WC	(Belgium) G Minnen (Belgium) A Van Uytvanck	7^{7}	6
(Switzerland) V Golubic (United States) J Loeb	3	3
2	(Belgium) K Flipkens (Sweden) J Larsson	6	6

Semifinals
WC	(Romania) R Șerban (Bulgaria) I Shinikova	6^{5}	3
(Belarus) V Lapko (Luxembourg) M Minella	7^{7}	6
WC	(Belgium) G Minnen (Belgium) A Van Uytvanck	7^{8}	3
2	(Belgium) K Flipkens (Sweden) J Larsson	6^{6}	1^{r}

Final
(Belarus) V Lapko (Luxembourg) M Minella	6^{3}	2
WC	(Belgium) G Minnen (Belgium) A Van Uytvanck	7^{7}	6
