= 2017 BGL Luxembourg Open – Singles =

Singles
- 2017 BGL Luxembourg Open

Final
- Champion: (Germany) Carina Witthöft
- Runner-up: (Puerto Rico) Monica Puig
- Score: 6–3, 7–5

Details
- Draw: 32
- Seeds: 8

Events
Singles	Doubles
- BGL Luxembourg Open

Monica Niculescu was the defending champion, but lost in the first round to Pauline Parmentier.

Carina Witthöft won her first WTA title, defeating Monica Puig in the final, 6–3, 7–5.

== Seeds ==
1. (Germany) Angelique Kerber (first round)
2. (Netherlands) Kiki Bertens (quarterfinals)
3. (Estonia) Anett Kontaveit (second round)
4. (Romania) Sorana Cîrstea (first round, retired)
5. (Belgium) Elise Mertens (semifinals)
6. (Germany) Tatjana Maria (first round)
7. (Brazil) Beatriz Haddad Maia (second round)
8. (United States) Varvara Lepchenko (first round)

== Draw ==
Key

- Q = Qualifier
- WC = Wild card
- LL = Lucky loser
- Alt = Alternate
- ITF = ITF entry
- PR = Protected ranking
- SR = Special ranking
- SE = Special exempt
- JE = Junior exempt
- JR = Junior Accelerator Programme entrant
- CO = College Accelerator Programme entrant
- NG = Next Gen Accelerator Program entrant
- w/o = Walkover
- r = Retired
- d = Defaulted

=== Finals ===
Semifinals
(Puerto Rico) Monica Puig	6	7
5	(Belgium) Elise Mertens	2	5
Q	(France) Pauline Parmentier	6^{2}	6	3
(Germany) Carina Witthöft	7^{7}	1	6

Final
(Puerto Rico) Monica Puig	3	5
(Germany) Carina Witthöft	6	7

=== Top half ===
First round
1/WC	(Germany) A Kerber	3	4
(Puerto Rico) M Puig	6	6
PR	(Croatia) A Tomljanović	2	4
Q	(Belgium) A Van Uytvanck	6	6
WC	(Germany) S Lisicki	7^{7}	7^{7}
SE	(Romania) M Buzărnescu	6^{3}	6^{4}
LL	(United Kingdom) N Broady	6	6
6	(Germany) T Maria	2	2
3	(Estonia) A Kontaveit	6	6
(Slovakia) J Čepelová	0	2
Q	(Belgium) Y Wickmayer	2	1
(United Kingdom) H Watson	6	6
(Spain) L Arruabarrena	2	2
(United States) M Brengle	6	6
(Spain) S Sorribes Tormo	0	2
5	(Belgium) E Mertens	6	6

Second round
(Puerto Rico) M Puig	7^{7}	7^{7}
Q	(Belgium) A Van Uytvanck	6^{2}	6^{1}
WC	(Germany) S Lisicki	6	5	3
LL	(United Kingdom) N Broady	4	7	6
3	(Estonia) A Kontaveit	4	4
(United Kingdom) H Watson	6	6
(United States) M Brengle	2	6	3
5	(Belgium) E Mertens	6	0	6

Quarterfinals
(Puerto Rico) M Puig	6	5	6
LL	(United Kingdom) N Broady	0	7	1
(United Kingdom) H Watson	4	4
5	(Belgium) E Mertens	6	6

Semifinals
(Puerto Rico) M Puig	6	7
5	(Belgium) E Mertens	2	5

=== Bottom half ===
First round
7	(Brazil) B Haddad Maia	6	6
(Belgium) K Flipkens	3	4
(Canada) E Bouchard	6	2	3
(Sweden) J Larsson	2	6	6
(Romania) M Niculescu	5	3
Q	(France) P Parmentier	7	6
(Paraguay) V Cepede Royg	7	3
4	(Romania) S Cîrstea	5	2^{r}
8	(United States) V Lepchenko	6^{1}	6	6^{1}
(Germany) C Witthöft	7^{7}	2	7^{7}
Q	(Croatia) J Fett	5	3
(Russia) E Rodina	7	6
WC	(Germany) A Petkovic	6	3	7^{7}
(Croatia) P Martić	1	6	6^{5}
(Czech Republic) D Allertová	4	5
2	(Netherlands) K Bertens	6	7

Second round
7	(Brazil) B Haddad Maia	6	6^{5}	2
(Sweden) J Larsson	3	7^{7}	6
Q	(France) P Parmentier	7	6
(Paraguay) V Cepede Royg	5	1
(Germany) C Witthöft	6	6
(Russia) E Rodina	2	3
WC	(Germany) A Petkovic	2	1^{r}
2	(Netherlands) K Bertens	6	2

Quarterfinals
(Sweden) J Larsson	1	2
Q	(France) P Parmentier	6	6
(Germany) C Witthöft	6	6
2	(Netherlands) K Bertens	1	2

Semifinals
Q	(France) P Parmentier	6^{2}	6	3
(Germany) C Witthöft	7^{7}	1	6

== Qualifying ==
=== Seeds ===
1. (Belgium) Alison Van Uytvanck (qualified)
2. (France) Pauline Parmentier (qualified)
3. (Croatia) Jana Fett (qualified)
4. (Netherlands) Richèl Hogenkamp (first round)
5. (Canada) Françoise Abanda (second round)
6. (United States) Sachia Vickery (qualifying competition)
7. (Romania) Ana Bogdan (second round)
8. (Belgium) Yanina Wickmayer (qualified)

=== Qualifiers ===
1. (Belgium) Alison Van Uytvanck
2. (France) Pauline Parmentier
3. (Croatia) Jana Fett
4. (Belgium) Yanina Wickmayer

=== Lucky losers ===
1. (United Kingdom) Naomi Broady

=== Draw ===
==== First qualifier ====
First round
1	(Belgium) Alison Van Uytvanck	6	6
(Russia) Sofya Zhuk	4	4
WC	(Germany) Anna-Lena Friedsam	6^{5}	5
(Austria) Barbara Haas	7^{7}	7
WC	(Italy) Cristiana Ferrando	7	0	0
(Switzerland) Patty Schnyder	5	6	1^{r}
(Czech Republic) Marie Bouzková	3	6	3
5	(Canada) Françoise Abanda	6	1	6

Second round
1	(Belgium) Alison Van Uytvanck	6^{4}	6	4
(Austria) Barbara Haas	7^{7}	0	1^{r}
(Switzerland) Patty Schnyder	6	6
5	(Canada) Françoise Abanda	2	1

Qualifying competition
1	(Belgium) Alison Van Uytvanck	4	6	6
(Switzerland) Patty Schnyder	6	4	2

==== Second qualifier ====
First round
2	(France) Pauline Parmentier	6	6
(United States) Alexa Glatch	0	3
(Germany) Annika Beck	6	3	2
(United States) Kayla Day	1	6	6
(United Kingdom) Naomi Broady	6	6
(Germany) Tamara Korpatsch	1	4
(United States) Caroline Dolehide	2	6	4
7	(Romania) Ana Bogdan	6	4	6

Second round
2	(France) Pauline Parmentier	6	6
(United States) Kayla Day	4	3
(United Kingdom) Naomi Broady	6	3	6
7	(Romania) Ana Bogdan	1	6	3

Qualifying competition
2	(France) Pauline Parmentier	3	7	6
(United Kingdom) Naomi Broady	6	5	3

==== Third qualifier ====
First round
3	(Croatia) Jana Fett	6^{5}	6	6
(Netherlands) Lesley Kerkhove	7^{7}	3	1
(Italy) Jasmine Paolini	5	2
(Hungary) Fanny Stollár	7	6
(Spain) María Teresa Torró Flor	4	5
(Romania) Alexandra Dulgheru	6	7
(Canada) Bianca Andreescu	4	3
6	(United States) Sachia Vickery	6	6

Second round
3	(Croatia) Jana Fett	6	6
(Hungary) Fanny Stollár	1	4
(Romania) Alexandra Dulgheru	5	2
6	(United States) Sachia Vickery	7	6

Qualifying competition
3	(Croatia) Jana Fett	7^{8}	6
6	(United States) Sachia Vickery	6^{6}	1

==== Fourth qualifier ====
First round
4	(Netherlands) Richèl Hogenkamp	6^{2}	6	4
(Germany) Antonia Lottner	7^{7}	3	6
WC	(Germany) Katharina Hobgarski	6	7^{7}
(Hungary) Dalma Gálfi	1	6^{3}
(Netherlands) Arantxa Rus	6^{2}	2
(Romania) Alexandra Cadanțu	7^{7}	6
WC	(Luxembourg) Eléonora Molinaro	6^{6}	3
8	(Belgium) Yanina Wickmayer	7^{8}	6

Second round
(Germany) Antonia Lottner	6	6
WC	(Germany) Katharina Hobgarski	3	3
(Romania) Alexandra Cadanțu	2^{r}
8	(Belgium) Yanina Wickmayer	5

Qualifying competition
(Germany) Antonia Lottner	5	4
8	(Belgium) Yanina Wickmayer	7	6
