= 2016 BGL Luxembourg Open – Singles =

Singles
- 2016 BGL Luxembourg Open

Final
- Champion: (Romania) Monica Niculescu
- Runner-up: (Czech Republic) Petra Kvitová
- Score: 6–4, 6–0

Details
- Draw: 32
- Seeds: 8

Events
Singles	Doubles
- BGL Luxembourg Open

Misaki Doi was the defending champion, but lost in the first round to Lauren Davis.

Monica Niculescu won the title, defeating Petra Kvitová in the final, 6–4, 6–0.

== Seeds ==
1. (Czech Republic) Petra Kvitová (final)
2. (Denmark) Caroline Wozniacki (quarterfinals, withdrew)
3. (Netherlands) Kiki Bertens (semifinals)
4. (France) Caroline Garcia (second round)
5. (Germany) Laura Siegemund (first round)
6. (Japan) Misaki Doi (first round)
7. (Canada) Eugenie Bouchard (first round)
8. (Sweden) Johanna Larsson (quarterfinals)

== Draw ==
Key

- Q = Qualifier
- WC = Wild card
- LL = Lucky loser
- Alt = Alternate
- ITF = ITF entry
- PR = Protected ranking
- SR = Special ranking
- SE = Special exempt
- JE = Junior exempt
- JR = Junior Accelerator Programme entrant
- CO = College Accelerator Programme entrant
- NG = Next Gen Accelerator Program entrant
- w/o = Walkover
- r = Retired
- d = Defaulted

=== Finals ===
Semifinals
1	(Czech Republic) Petra Kvitová	7	6
Q	(United States) Lauren Davis	5	3
3	(Netherlands) Kiki Bertens	3	3
(Romania) Monica Niculescu	6	6

Final
1	(Czech Republic) Petra Kvitová	4	0
(Romania) Monica Niculescu	6	6

=== Top half ===
First round
1	(Czech Republic) P Kvitová	7	6
(Chinese Taipei) S-w Hsieh	5	0
(United States) V Lepchenko	6	3	6
(Bulgaria) T Pironkova	1	6	1
Q	(Germany) C Witthöft	1	4
(Germany) M Barthel	6	6
(France) P Parmentier	4	2
8	(Sweden) J Larsson	6	6
4	(France) C Garcia	7^{7}	2	6
(Estonia) A Kontaveit	6^{2}	6	4
(Germany) A Petkovic	1	7	6
WC	(Luxembourg) M Minella	6	5	4
Q	(Czech Republic) Kr Plíšková	3	6	6
WC	(France) O Dodin	6	3	4
Q	(United States) L Davis	6	6
6	(Japan) M Doi	1	2

Second round
1	(Czech Republic) P Kvitová	4	6	6
(United States) V Lepchenko	6	2	1
(Germany) M Barthel	1	4
8	(Sweden) J Larsson	6	6
4	(France) C Garcia	1	1
(Germany) A Petkovic	6	6
Q	(Czech Republic) Kr Plíšková	6	4	3
Q	(United States) L Davis	2	6	6

Quarterfinals
1	(Czech Republic) P Kvitová	6	6
8	(Sweden) J Larsson	2	0
(Germany) A Petkovic	6	5	2
Q	(United States) L Davis	2	7	6

Semifinals
1	(Czech Republic) P Kvitová	7	6
Q	(United States) L Davis	5	3

=== Bottom half ===
First round
7	(Canada) E Bouchard	6	3	3
(Czech Republic) D Allertová	3	6	6
Q	(Czech Republic) T Smitková	6	6
(Romania) S Cîrstea	3	3
(Belgium) Y Wickmayer	0	6	3
(Slovakia) AK Schmiedlová	6	1	6
(Germany) A Beck	4	4
3	(Netherlands) K Bertens	6	6
5	(Germany) L Siegemund	2	2
WC	(Italy) F Schiavone	6	6
(Belgium) K Flipkens	4	2
(Romania) M Niculescu	6	6
(Germany) S Lisicki	6	3	6
(Switzerland) V Golubic	3	6	2
(United States) M Brengle	2	2
2	(Denmark) C Wozniacki	6	6

Second round
(Czech Republic) D Allertová	3	7^{7}	6
Q	(Czech Republic) T Smitková	6	6^{4}	3
(Slovakia) AK Schmiedlová	3	1
3	(Netherlands) K Bertens	6	6
WC	(Italy) F Schiavone	6	5	4
(Romania) M Niculescu	3	7	6
(Germany) S Lisicki	6	2	3
2	(Denmark) C Wozniacki	3	6	6

Quarterfinals
(Czech Republic) D Allertová	0	4
3	(Netherlands) K Bertens	6	6
(Romania) M Niculescu	w/o
2	(Denmark) C Wozniacki

Semifinals
3	(Netherlands) K Bertens	3	3
(Romania) M Niculescu	6	6

== Qualifying ==
=== Seeds ===
1. (Czech Republic) Kristýna Plíšková (qualified)
2. (United States) Lauren Davis (qualified)
3. (Germany) Carina Witthöft (qualified)
4. (Switzerland) Stefanie Vögele (first round, retired)
5. (Belgium) Alison Van Uytvanck (first round)
6. (Romania) Patricia Maria Țig (qualifying competition)
7. (United States) Julia Boserup (second round)
8. (Slovakia) Rebecca Šramková (first round)

=== Qualifiers ===
1. (Czech Republic) Kristýna Plíšková
2. (United States) Lauren Davis
3. (Germany) Carina Witthöft
4. (Czech Republic) Tereza Smitková

=== Draw ===
==== First qualifier ====
First round
1	(Czech Republic) Kristýna Plíšková	6	6
WC	(Luxembourg) Laura Correia	2	2
WC	(United States) Nicole Melichar	6	4	6^{6}
(Bulgaria) Isabella Shinikova	4	6	7^{8}
(United Kingdom) Tara Moore	6	4	6
(Sweden) Susanne Celik	4	6	4
(Slovakia) Daniela Hantuchová	1	6	6
5	(Belgium) Alison Van Uytvanck	6	3	2

Second round
1	(Czech Republic) Kristýna Plíšková	6	7^{7}
(Bulgaria) Isabella Shinikova	4	6^{3}
(United Kingdom) Tara Moore	6	7
(Slovakia) Daniela Hantuchová	4	5

Qualifying competition
1	(Czech Republic) Kristýna Plíšková	7	3	6
(United Kingdom) Tara Moore	5	6	3

==== Second qualifier ====
First round
2	(United States) Lauren Davis	6	6
WC	(Luxembourg) Eléonora Molinaro	0	2
(Liechtenstein) Kathinka von Deichmann	0	6	6
(Germany) Antonia Lottner	6	2	3
(Germany) Tamara Korpatsch	6	5	6
(Paraguay) Montserrat González	1	7	1
(Slovenia) Dalila Jakupović	4	6	6
8	(Slovakia) Rebecca Šramková	6	4	1

Second round
2	(United States) Lauren Davis	6	6
(Liechtenstein) Kathinka von Deichmann	3	3
(Germany) Tamara Korpatsch	4	6	6
(Slovenia) Dalila Jakupović	6	3	1

Qualifying competition
2	(United States) Lauren Davis	6	3	7
(Germany) Tamara Korpatsch	2	6	5

==== Third qualifier ====
First round
3	(Germany) Carina Witthöft	6	6
(Denmark) Karen Barritza	2	0
(Italy) Martina Trevisan	6^{3}	5
(France) Myrtille Georges	7^{7}	7
(Russia) Polina Monova	1	1
(Slovakia) Michaela Hončová	6	6
Alt	(Belarus) Ilona Kremen	4	5
6	(Romania) Patricia Maria Țig	6	7

Second round
3	(Germany) Carina Witthöft	6	6
(France) Myrtille Georges	3	2
(Slovakia) Michaela Hončová	3	0
6	(Romania) Patricia Maria Țig	6	6

Qualifying competition
3	(Germany) Carina Witthöft	6	6
6	(Romania) Patricia Maria Țig	1	3

==== Fourth qualifier ====
First round
4	(Switzerland) Stefanie Vögele	0	0^{r}
(Belgium) Elise Mertens	6	3
(United States) Caitlin Whoriskey	6	6
WC	(Italy) Claudia Coppola	0	3
(Czech Republic) Tereza Smitková	6	7^{7}
(Belgium) Greetje Minnen	4	6^{3}
(Czech Republic) Jesika Malečková	6	4	6^{1}
7	(United States) Julia Boserup	2	6	7^{7}

Second round
(Belgium) Elise Mertens	5	0
(United States) Caitlin Whoriskey	7	6
(Czech Republic) Tereza Smitková	7^{7}	6
7	(United States) Julia Boserup	6^{5}	0

Qualifying competition
(United States) Caitlin Whoriskey	5	2
(Czech Republic) Tereza Smitková	7	6
