= 2016 BGL Luxembourg Open – Doubles =

Doubles
- 2016 BGL Luxembourg Open

Final
- Champions: (Netherlands) Kiki Bertens (Sweden) Johanna Larsson
- Runners-up: (Romania) Monica Niculescu (Romania) Patricia Maria Țig
- Score: 4–6, 7–5, [11–9]

Details
- Draw: 16
- Seeds: 4

Events
Singles	Doubles
- BGL Luxembourg Open

Mona Barthel and Laura Siegemund were the defending champions, but Barthel chose not to participate this year. Siegemund played alongside Antonia Lottner, but lost in the first round to Annika Beck and Xenia Knoll.

Kiki Bertens and Johanna Larsson won the title, defeating Monica Niculescu and Patricia Maria Țig in the final, 4–6, 7–5, [11–9].

== Seeds ==
1. (United States) Raquel Atawo / (United States) Abigail Spears (first round)
2. (Netherlands) Kiki Bertens / (Sweden) Johanna Larsson (champions)
3. (Germany) Anna-Lena Grönefeld / (Czech Republic) Květa Peschke (first round)
4. (Netherlands) Demi Schuurs / (Czech Republic) Renata Voráčová (first round)

== Draw ==
Key

- Q = Qualifier
- WC = Wild card
- LL = Lucky loser
- Alt = Alternate
- ITF = ITF entry
- PR = Protected ranking
- SR = Special ranking
- SE = Special exempt
- JE = Junior exempt
- JR = Junior Accelerator Programme entrant
- CO = College Accelerator Programme entrant
- NG = Next Gen Accelerator Program entrant
- w/o = Walkover
- r = Retired
- d = Defaulted

First round
1	(United States) R Atawo (United States) A Spears	2	7^{7}	[13]
(United Kingdom) J Rae (United Kingdom) A Smith	6	6^{0}	[15]
(Slovakia) M Hončová (Belarus) I Kremen	4	0
(Switzerland) V Golubic (United States) N Melichar	6	6
3	(Germany) A-L Grönefeld (Czech Republic) K Peschke	6^{4}	3
(Romania) M Niculescu (Romania) PM Țig	7^{7}	6
(United States) A Weinhold (United States) C Whoriskey	6	7
(Czech Republic) L Kunčíková (Czech Republic) K Stuchlá	4	5
(Germany) A Lottner (Germany) L Siegemund	4	4
(Germany) A Beck (Switzerland) X Knoll	6	6
(United States) M Brengle (Germany) N Geuer	6	3	[10]
4	(Netherlands) D Schuurs (Czech Republic) R Voráčová	2	6	[5]
WC	(Chinese Taipei) S-y Hsieh (Chinese Taipei) S-w Hsieh	4	6	[8]
(Belgium) K Flipkens (Belgium) E Mertens	6	4	[10]
WC	(United States) J Boserup (Luxembourg) M Minella	2	1
2	(Netherlands) K Bertens (Sweden) J Larsson	6	6

Quarterfinals
(United Kingdom) J Rae (United Kingdom) A Smith	6	6
(Switzerland) V Golubic (United States) N Melichar	1	4
(Romania) M Niculescu (Romania) PM Țig	6	6
(United States) A Weinhold (United States) C Whoriskey	1	4
(Germany) A Beck (Switzerland) X Knoll	6	4	[4]
(United States) M Brengle (Germany) N Geuer	3	6	[10]
(Belgium) K Flipkens (Belgium) E Mertens	4	6	[11]
2	(Netherlands) K Bertens (Sweden) J Larsson	6	3	[13]

Semifinals
(United Kingdom) J Rae (United Kingdom) A Smith	6	4	[8]
(Romania) M Niculescu (Romania) PM Țig	0	6	[10]
(United States) M Brengle (Germany) N Geuer	2	2
2	(Netherlands) K Bertens (Sweden) J Larsson	6	6

Final
(Romania) M Niculescu (Romania) PM Țig	6	5	[9]
2	(Netherlands) K Bertens (Sweden) J Larsson	4	7	[11]
