= 2018 BGL Luxembourg Open – Singles =

Singles
- 2018 BGL Luxembourg Open

Final
- Champion: (Germany) Julia Görges
- Runner-up: (Switzerland) Belinda Bencic
- Score: 6–4, 7–5

Events
Singles	Doubles
- BGL Luxembourg Open

Carina Witthöft was the defending champion, but lost in the first round to Vera Lapko.

Julia Görges won the title, defeating Belinda Bencic in the final, 6–4, 7–5.

== Seeds ==
1. (Germany) Julia Görges (champion)
2. (Spain) Garbiñe Muguruza (second round)
3. (Spain) Carla Suárez Navarro (second round)
4. (Italy) Camila Giorgi (withdrew)
5. (Czech Republic) Kateřina Siniaková (second round)
6. (Croatia) Donna Vekić (quarterfinals)
7. (Greece) Maria Sakkari (first round)
8. (France) Pauline Parmentier (second round)
9. (Belgium) Kirsten Flipkens (second round)

== Draw ==
Key

- Q = Qualifier
- WC = Wild card
- LL = Lucky loser
- Alt = Alternate
- ITF = ITF entry
- PR = Protected ranking
- SR = Special ranking
- SE = Special exempt
- JE = Junior exempt
- JR = Junior Accelerator Programme entrant
- CO = College Accelerator Programme entrant
- NG = Next Gen Accelerator Program entrant
- w/o = Walkover
- r = Retired
- d = Defaulted

=== Finals ===
Semifinals
1	(Germany) Julia Görges	6^{3}	7	6
Q	(Canada) Eugenie Bouchard	7^{7}	5	1
Q	(Switzerland) Belinda Bencic	6	3	7^{7}
SE	(Ukraine) Dayana Yastremska	2	6	6^{5}

Final
1	(Germany) Julia Görges	6	7
Q	(Switzerland) Belinda Bencic	4	5

=== Top half ===
First round
1	(Germany) J Görges	6	6
(Slovakia) V Kužmová	4	3
(Russia) A Blinkova	6	7
(Germany) T Maria	2	5
WC	(France) F Ferro	4	7^{8}	6
(Romania) M Niculescu	6	6^{6}	0
(Slovakia) AK Schmiedlová	0	1
6	(Croatia) D Vekić	6	6
3	(Spain) C Suárez Navarro	6	6
Q	(Czech Republic) Kr Plíšková	3	4
Q	(Canada) E Bouchard	6	6
(Hungary) T Babos	4	2
(Germany) A Petkovic	6	6
(Belgium) A Van Uytvanck	3	4
(Sweden) J Larsson	1	7^{7}	0
5	(Czech Republic) K Siniaková	6	6^{5}	6

Second round
1	(Germany) J Görges	6	6
(Russia) A Blinkova	1	4
WC	(France) F Ferro	6	1	5
6	(Croatia) D Vekić	2	6	7
3	(Spain) C Suárez Navarro	1	0
Q	(Canada) E Bouchard	6	6
(Germany) A Petkovic	6	6
5	(Czech Republic) K Siniaková	2	3

Quarterfinals
1	(Germany) J Görges	6	3	6
6	(Croatia) D Vekić	3	6	3
Q	(Canada) E Bouchard	4	4
(Germany) A Petkovic	6	0^{r}

Semifinals
1	(Germany) J Görges	6^{3}	7	6
Q	(Canada) E Bouchard	7^{7}	5	1

=== Bottom half ===
First round
8	(France) P Parmentier	7^{10}	6
(Switzerland) V Golubic	6^{8}	2
(Belarus) V Lapko	6	5	6
(Germany) C Witthöft	4	7	4
Q	(Switzerland) B Bencic	6	6
Q	(Netherlands) A Rus	2	1
WC	(Luxembourg) M Minella	2	3
9	(Belgium) K Flipkens	6	6
7	(Greece) M Sakkari	1	6^{4}
PR	(Russia) M Gasparyan	6	7^{7}
(Slovenia) D Jakupović	7^{7}	3	6
(Ukraine) K Kozlova	6^{3}	6	4
SE	(Ukraine) D Yastremska	6	6^{10}	7^{7}
LL	(United States) V Lepchenko	2	7^{12}	6^{5}
(Switzerland) S Vögele	4	4
2/WC	(Spain) G Muguruza	6	6

Second round
8	(France) P Parmentier	5	2
(Belarus) V Lapko	7	6
Q	(Switzerland) B Bencic	6	6
9	(Belgium) K Flipkens	1	3
PR	(Russia) M Gasparyan	6	6
(Slovenia) D Jakupović	4	0
SE	(Ukraine) D Yastremska	6	6
2/WC	(Spain) G Muguruza	2	3

Quarterfinals
(Belarus) V Lapko	4	1
Q	(Switzerland) B Bencic	6	6
PR	(Russia) M Gasparyan	1	4
SE	(Ukraine) D Yastremska	6	6

Semifinals
Q	(Switzerland) B Bencic	6	3	7^{7}
SE	(Ukraine) D Yastremska	2	6	6^{5}

== Qualifying ==
=== Seeds ===
1. (Switzerland) Belinda Bencic (qualified)
2. (United Kingdom) Heather Watson (first round)
3. (Serbia) Olga Danilović (first round)
4. (Czech Republic) Kristýna Plíšková (qualified)
5. (Canada) Eugenie Bouchard (qualified)
6. (Netherlands) Arantxa Rus (qualified)
7. (Germany) Tamara Korpatsch (first round)
8. (Czech Republic) Tereza Smitková (qualifying competition)

=== Qualifiers ===
1. (Switzerland) Belinda Bencic
2. (Netherlands) Arantxa Rus
3. (Canada) Eugenie Bouchard
4. (Czech Republic) Kristýna Plíšková

=== Lucky loser ===
1. (United States) Varvara Lepchenko

=== Draw ===
==== First qualifier ====
First round
1	(Switzerland) Belinda Bencic	6	6
WC	(Switzerland) Leonie Küng	2	2
(Romania) Elena-Gabriela Ruse	3	6	7^{12}
(Italy) Martina Trevisan	6	3	6^{10}
(United States) Varvara Lepchenko	6	6
(Switzerland) Patty Schnyder	4	2
(Bulgaria) Isabella Shinikova	6	6^{5}	7
7	(Germany) Tamara Korpatsch	3	7^{7}	5

Second round
1	(Switzerland) Belinda Bencic	6	2	6
(Romania) Elena-Gabriela Ruse	1	6	1
(United States) Varvara Lepchenko	3	6	6
(Bulgaria) Isabella Shinikova	6	4	3

Qualifying competition
1	(Switzerland) Belinda Bencic	6	7
(United States) Varvara Lepchenko	3	5

==== Second qualifier ====
First round
2	(United Kingdom) Heather Watson	2	6	4
(Czech Republic) Karolína Muchová	6	2	6
(Germany) Lena Rüffer	4	6	3
(Croatia) Jana Fett	6	2	6
WC	(Netherlands) Indy de Vroome	3	2
(Bulgaria) Elitsa Kostova	6	6
(Poland) Katarzyna Piter	1	3
6	(Netherlands) Arantxa Rus	6	6

Second round
(Czech Republic) Karolína Muchová
(Croatia) Jana Fett	w/o
(Bulgaria) Elitsa Kostova	2	3
6	(Netherlands) Arantxa Rus	6	6

Qualifying competition
(Croatia) Jana Fett	6	5	1
6	(Netherlands) Arantxa Rus	3	7	6

==== Third qualifier ====
First round
3	(Serbia) Olga Danilović	4	3
(France) Jessika Ponchet	6	6
(Netherlands) Richèl Hogenkamp	2	6	7
(Croatia) Tena Lukas	6	4	5
(Hungary) Gréta Arn	6^{6}	3
(Switzerland) Jil Teichmann	7^{8}	6
(Romania) Raluca Șerban	1	6	1
5	(Canada) Eugenie Bouchard	6	2	6

Second round
(France) Jessika Ponchet	6	6
(Netherlands) Richèl Hogenkamp	3	4
(Switzerland) Jil Teichmann	3	1
5	(Canada) Eugenie Bouchard	6	6

Qualifying competition
(France) Jessika Ponchet	2	5
5	(Canada) Eugenie Bouchard	6	7

==== Fourth qualifier ====
First round
4/WC	(Czech Republic) Kristýna Plíšková	6	6
(Japan) Mayo Hibi	4	1
(Germany) Katharina Gerlach	7	3	1
WC	(Belgium) Greet Minnen	5	6	6
(Germany) Antonia Lottner	6	4	4
PR	(Slovakia) Rebecca Šramková	2	6	6
(United States) Jamie Loeb	7^{7}	4	4
8	(Czech Republic) Tereza Smitková	6^{1}	6	6

Second round
4/WC	(Czech Republic) Kristýna Plíšková	6	6
WC	(Belgium) Greet Minnen	2	4
PR	(Slovakia) Rebecca Šramková	6	3	2
8	(Czech Republic) Tereza Smitková	4	6	6

Qualifying competition
4/WC	(Czech Republic) Kristýna Plíšková	6	6
8	(Czech Republic) Tereza Smitková	2	2
