= 2018 BGL Luxembourg Open =

- Date: 15–20 October
- Edition: 23rd
- Category: WTA International
- Draw: 32S / 16D
- Prize money: $250,000
- Surface: Hard (indoor)
- Location: Kockelscheuer, Luxembourg

Champions

Singles
- (Germany) Julia Görges

Doubles
- (Belgium) Greet Minnen / (Belgium) Alison Van Uytvanck
- Luxembourg Open

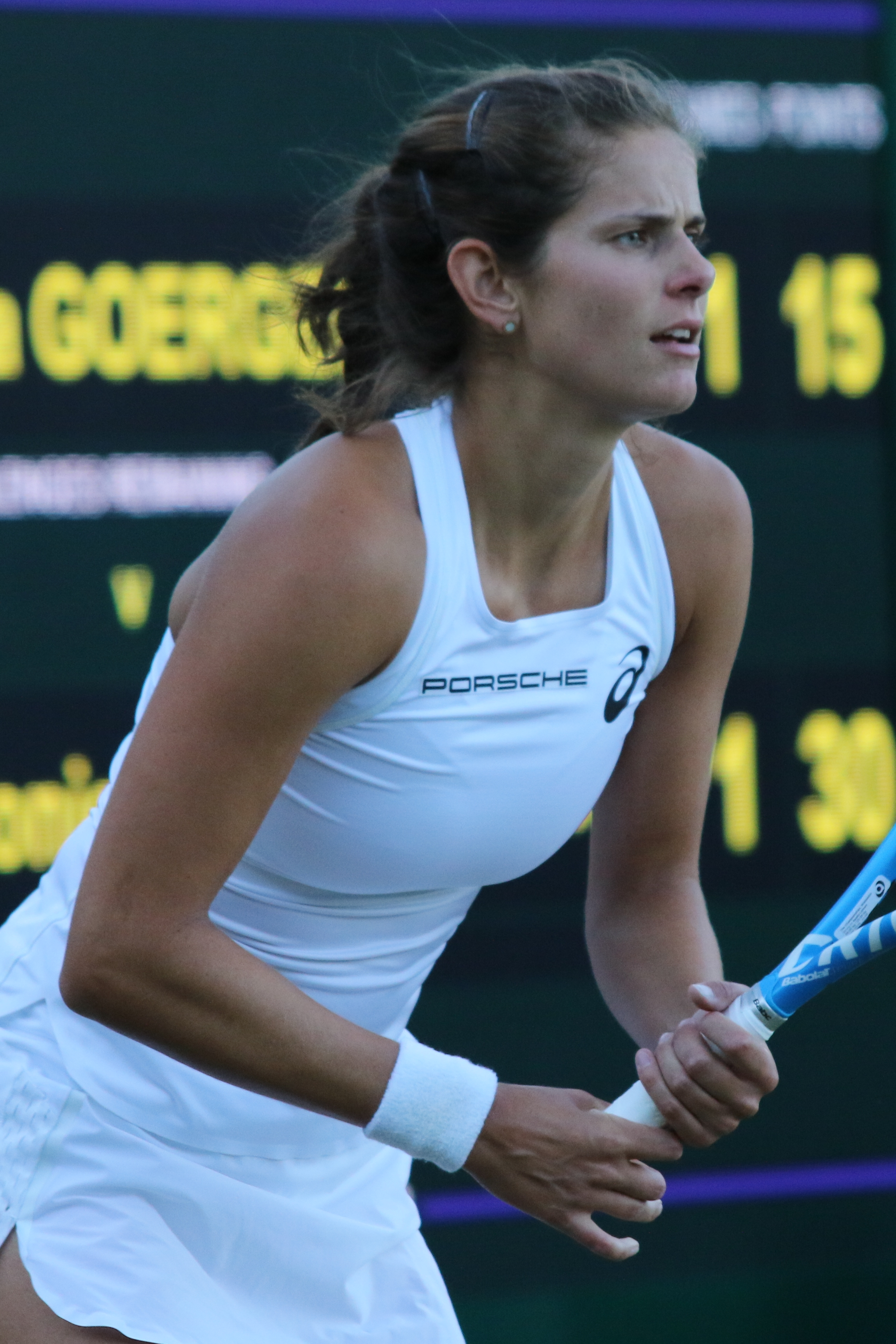

The 2018 BGL BNP Paribas Luxembourg Open was a women's tennis tournament played on indoor hard courts sponsored by BNP Paribas. It was the 23rd edition of the Luxembourg Open, and part of the WTA International tournaments category of the 2018 WTA Tour. It was held in Kockelscheuer, Luxembourg from 15 October until 20 October 2018.

== Finals ==
=== Singles ===
- (Germany) Julia Görges defeated (Switzerland) Belinda Bencic, 6–4, 7–5

=== Doubles ===
- (Belgium) Greet Minnen / (Belgium) Alison Van Uytvanck defeated (Belarus) Vera Lapko / (Luxembourg) Mandy Minella, 7–6^{(7–3)}, 6–2

== Points and prize money ==
=== Point distribution ===
| Event | W | F | SF | QF | Round of 16 | Round of 32 | Q | Q3 | Q2 | Q1 |
| Singles | 280 | 180 | 110 | 60 | 30 | 1 | 18 | 14 | 10 | 1 |
| Doubles | 280 | 180 | 110 | 60 | 1 | —N/a | —N/a | —N/a | —N/a | —N/a |

=== Prize money ===
| Event | W | F | SF | QF | Round of 16 | Round of 32^{1} | Q3 | Q2 | Q1 |
| Singles | €34,677 | €17,258 | €9,113 | €4,758 | €2,669 | €1,552 | €810 | €589 | €427 |
| Doubles * | €9,919 | €5,161 | €2,770 | €1,468 | €774 | —N/a | —N/a | —N/a | —N/a |

_{^{1} Qualifiers prize money is also the Round of 32 prize money}
_{* per team}

== Singles entrants ==
=== Seeds ===
| Country | Player | Rank^{1} | Seed |
|---|---|---|---|
| GER | Julia Görges | 9 | 1 |
| ESP | Garbiñe Muguruza | 13 | 2 |
| ESP | Carla Suárez Navarro | 23 | 3 |
| ~~ITA~~ | ~~Camila Giorgi~~ | ~~32~~ | ~~4~~ |
| CZE | Kateřina Siniaková | 33 | 5 |
| CRO | Donna Vekić | 37 | 6 |
| GRE | Maria Sakkari | 42 | 7 |
| FRA | Pauline Parmentier | 49 | 8 |
| BEL | Kirsten Flipkens | 51 | 9 |

- Rankings as of 8 October 2018

=== Other entrants ===
The following players received wildcards into the singles main draw:

- (France) Fiona Ferro
- (Luxembourg) Mandy Minella
- (Spain) Garbiñe Muguruza

The following player received entry using a protected ranking into the singles main draw:

- (Russia) Margarita Gasparyan

The following player received entry as a special exempt:

- (Ukraine) Dayana Yastremska

The following players received entry from the qualifying draw:

- (Switzerland) Belinda Bencic
- (Canada) Eugenie Bouchard
- (Netherlands) Arantxa Rus
- (Czech Republic) Kristýna Plíšková

The following player received entry as a lucky loser:

- (United States) Varvara Lepchenko

=== Withdrawals ===
Before the tournament

- (Belarus) Victoria Azarenka → replaced by (Ukraine) Kateryna Kozlova
- (Romania) Sorana Cîrstea → replaced by (Slovenia) Dalila Jakupović
- (Italy) Camila Giorgi → replaced by (United States) Varvara Lepchenko
- (Slovenia) Polona Hercog → replaced by (Germany) Carina Witthöft
- (Sweden) Rebecca Peterson → replaced by (Germany) Andrea Petkovic
- (Puerto Rico) Monica Puig → replaced by (Russia) Anna Blinkova
- (United States) Venus Williams → replaced by (Slovakia) Anna Karolína Schmiedlová
- (Slovenia) Tamara Zidanšek → replaced by (Sweden) Johanna Larsson

=== Retirements ===
- (Germany) Andrea Petkovic

== Doubles entrants ==
=== Seeds ===
| Country | Player | Country | Player | Rank^{1} | Seed |
|---|---|---|---|---|---|
| UKR | Lyudmyla Kichenok | SLO | Katarina Srebotnik | 59 | 1 |
| BEL | Kirsten Flipkens | SWE | Johanna Larsson | 68 | 2 |
| ROU | Irina Bara | SUI | Xenia Knoll | 146 | 3 |
| SLO | Dalila Jakupović | CZE | Renata Voráčová | 147 | 4 |

- ^{1} Rankings as of 8 October 2018

=== Other entrants ===
The following pairs received a wildcard into the doubles main draw:

- (Belgium) Greet Minnen / (Belgium) Alison Van Uytvanck
- (Romania) Raluca Șerban / (Bulgaria) Isabella Shinikova

=== Withdrawals ===
Before the tournament

- (Romania) Monica Niculescu
