= Kiki Bertens =

Dutch tennis player (born 1991)

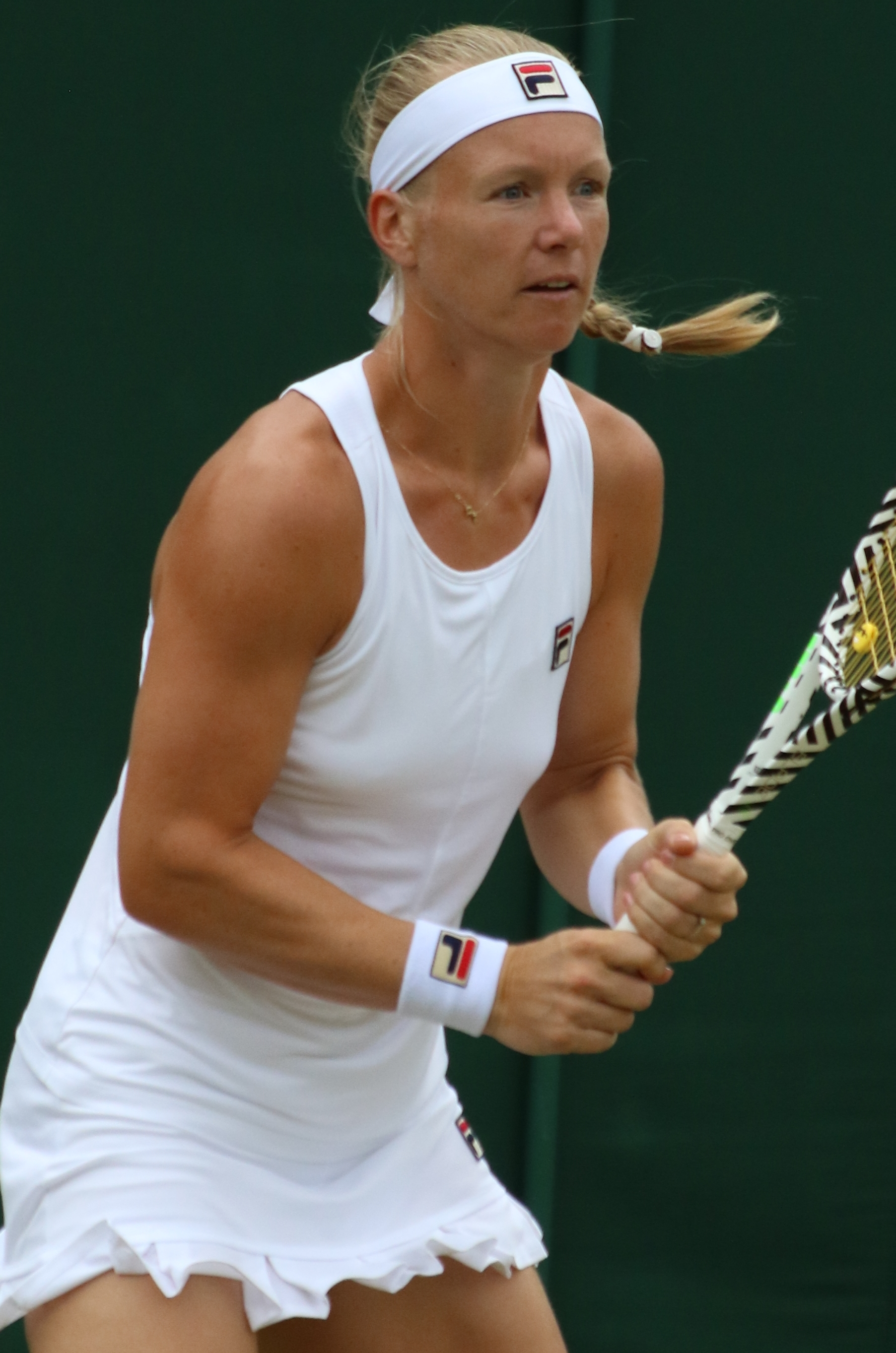
- Bertens at the 2019 Wimbledon Championships
- Country (sports): Netherlands
- Residence: Breda, Netherlands
- Born: 10 December 1991 (age 33) Wateringen, Netherlands
- Height: 1.82 m (6 ft 0 in)
- Turned pro: 2009
- Retired: 26 July 2021
- Plays: Right-handed (two-handed backhand)
- Coach: Elise Tamaëla (2019–2021)
- Prize money: US$ 11,653,190
- Official website: kikibertens.nl

Singles
- Career record: 443–265
- Career titles: 10
- Highest ranking: No. 4 (13 May 2019)

Grand Slam singles results
- Australian Open: 4R (2020)
- French Open: SF (2016)
- Wimbledon: QF (2018)
- US Open: 3R (2018, 2019)

Other tournaments
- Tour Finals: SF (2018)
- Olympic Games: 1R (2016, 2020)

Doubles
- Career record: 184–104
- Career titles: 10
- Highest ranking: No. 16 (16 April 2018)

Grand Slam doubles results
- Australian Open: QF (2015)
- French Open: QF (2016)
- Wimbledon: 3R (2018)
- US Open: 3R (2015)

Other doubles tournaments
- Tour Finals: F (2017)
- Olympic Games: 2R (2020)

Grand Slam mixed doubles results
- Wimbledon: 2R (2016)

Team competitions
- Fed Cup: SF (2016), record 27–5

Kiki Bertens (Dutch pronunciation: [ˈkiki ˈbɛrtəns]; born 10 December 1991) is a Dutch former professional tennis player. Her career-high singles ranking was world No. 4, which she reached on 13 May 2019, becoming the highest-ranked Dutch female player ever. Her career-high doubles ranking of world No. 16, she achieved in April 2018. She won ten singles and ten doubles titles on the WTA Tour, including 2018 Cincinnati Open and 2019 Madrid Open. Bertens was widely regarded as a clay court specialist, but also was successful on hardcourt.

== Early life and background ==
Bertens was born on 10 December 1991 in Wateringen near The Hague, but grew up in the town of Berkel en Rodenrijs. She has two sisters, one older and one younger. Bertens started playing tennis at age six at ATV Berkenrode, a tennis club where her aunt and uncle played. She has been coached by Martin van der Brugghen at the club since she was seven years old. Van der Brugghen recognized her ability and continued to coach her primarily to help her reach her potential. He said: "In the youth we have supported her very much. I taught her for little money because I find it interesting to see how far you can get with someone." Bertens received little support from the Dutch tennis federation. She did not play on the ITF Junior Circuit except for one appearance at the Junior Fed Cup in 2007.

== Senior career ==
=== 2012: First WTA Tour title ===
Bertens started the year playing the qualifiers for the Australian Open. In the first round against top seed Vesna Dolonts, she won the first ten games before Dolonts retired. In the second, Bertens lost to Olga Savchuk in a close three-set match. The following week, in a $25k event in Andrézieux-Bouthéon, Bertens retired with a thigh injury in the first round against Corinna Dentoni.

She played in the Fed Cup for the Dutch team, competing in Group 1 of Europe/Africa. She partnered with Demi Schuurs in the doubles match against the Portuguese team of Bárbara Luz and Margarida Moura and won in two sets. Bertens won her singles rubber against Estonia's Eva Paalma and with Michaëlla Krajicek double-bageled Anett Kontaveit and Tatjana Vorobjova. Late February she played the qualifications for WTA tournament of Acapulco. She defeated Mexican wild card Ana Paula de la Peña in the first round but lost in the second qualification round to Sesil Karatantcheva.

At a $25k event in Irapuato, Mexico, Bertens won her second ITF singles title, beating Yaroslava Shvedova in the final, propelling her to a new career high in singles ranking. The following week, she made it to the quarterfinals of the $25k tournament in Poza Rica, but her winning streak was snapped by Jana Čepelová. At the $25k tournament in Bath the week afterwards, Bertens won the title, defeating Annika Beck in the final in three sets, her fourth three-set match in a row. Bertens failed to qualify for the WTA Tour tournament in Copenhagen, falling to Johanna Konta.

In the qualifying for the WTA Tour event in Fes, she beat Moroccan wildcard Intissar Rassif without dropping a game. She reached her first WTA tournament final in this tournament, defeating Urszula Radwańska, sixth seed Chanelle Scheepers, Garbiñe Muguruza, and fifth seed Simona Halep along the way. Prior to this event, she had never won a WTA singles match in the main draw. In the final, she defeated Laura Pous Tió, winning the last eight games. She became the first Dutch female player since Michaëlla Krajicek in 2006 to win a WTA singles tournament.

At the French Open, Bertens was seeded No. 1 in qualifying and defeated Annika Beck in the first qualifying round, saving a matchpoint in the third set. She defeated Olga Puchkova in the second round and outclassed Mădălina Gojnea in the final qualifying round. This meant Bertens' first main-draw appearance at a Grand Slam tournament. In the first round, she lost in three sets to Christina McHale.

Bertens debuted at Wimbledon in her first-round match against the No. 19 seed Lucie Šafářová and won in two sets, her first win at a Grand Slam event. In the second round, she lost to Yaroslava Shvedova in straight sets. Bertens then made a brief appearance at an ITF tournament in Biella, but lost to homeplayer Nastassja Burnett in the first round. This was followed by first-round losses in Palermo and Båstad to Alexandra Cadanțu and Polona Hercog, respectively.

Bertens returned to form during the American hardcourt circuit. In Montreal, she qualified by defeating Vladimíra Uhlířová, Zhang Shuai, saving two matchpoints, and Alexa Glatch. In the main draw, Bertens caused an upset, defeating former world No. 3 (then ranked 22) Nadia Petrova, coming back from a large deficit. In the second round, Caroline Wozniacki proved too strong, and Bertens lost in straight sets. Like in Montreal, Bertens qualified for the main draw in Cincinnati, defeating Aravane Rezaï and Yulia Putintseva. However, in the main event she succumbed to fellow qualifier Sesil Karatantcheva. In Dallas, she retired with a shoulder injury against Polona Hercog.

At the US Open, Bertens exacted revenge on Christina McHale, knocking out the American in the first round but suffering a three-set loss to Olga Puchkova in the second round. Bertens stated afterwards she had been nervous during the match. At the WTA tournament in Seoul, Bertens defeated Vania King and Sílvia Soler Espinosa from Spain to reach the quarterfinals. She faced Estonian Kaia Kanepi next and lost in straight sets. After a second-round appearance in Linz she ended her season with a first-round loss in Luxembourg due to fatigue.

=== 2013–2015 ===
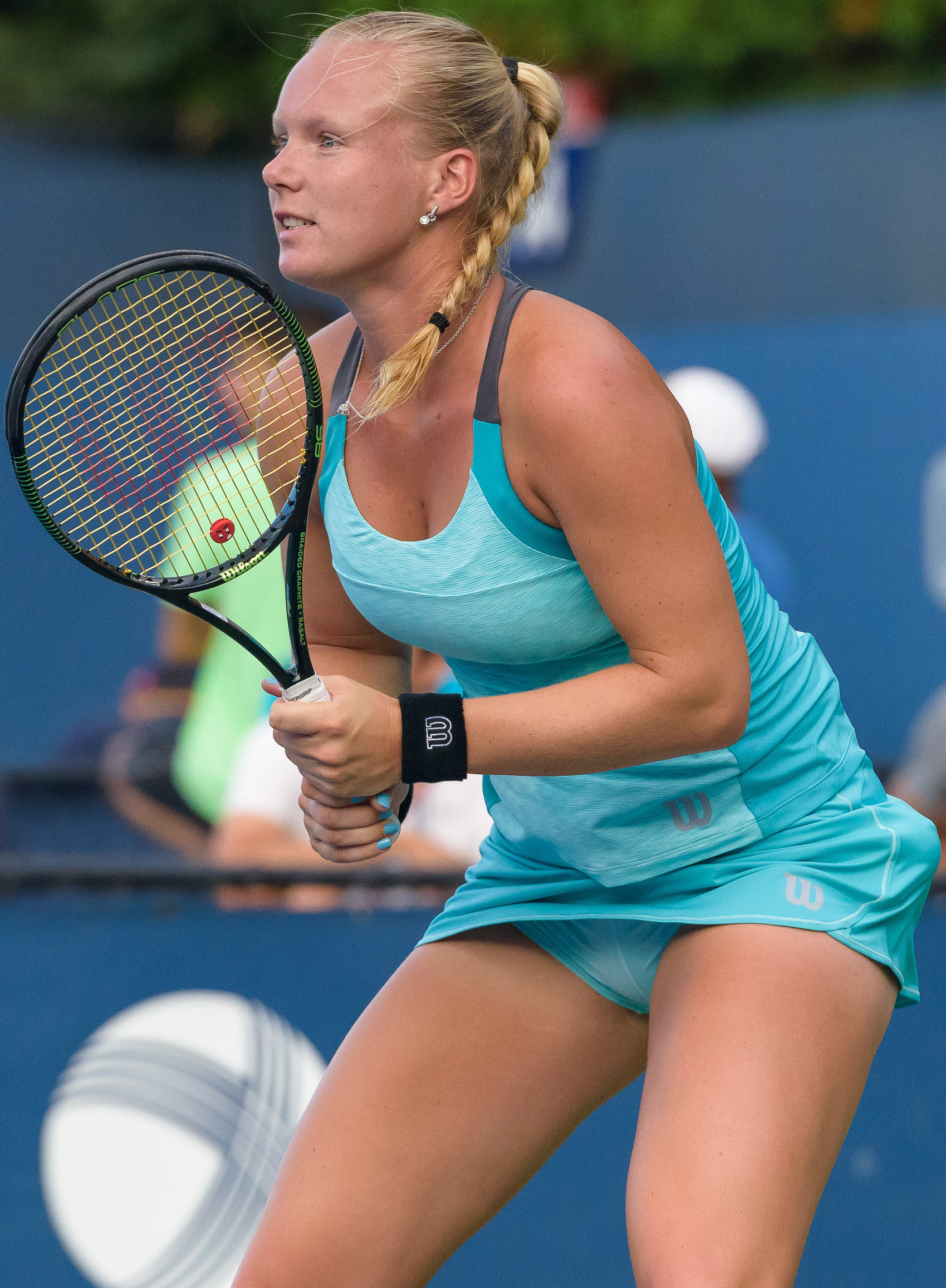
Bertens at the 2015 US Open qualifying

Starting the year ranked No. 63, her first tournament was the Auckland Open. In the first round, she defeated Svetlana Kuznetsova in three sets. In the second round, she beat Heather Watson. In the quarterfinals, Bertens was defeated by Jamie Hampton. Seeded fifth for qualifying at the Sydney International, she lost in the first round of qualifying to Misaki Doi. Ranked 60 at the Australian Open, Bertens was defeated in the first round by Lucie Hradecká.

Seeded fourth for qualifying at the Paris indoor event, Bertens reached the final round where she lost to Virginie Razzano. However, she entered the main draw as a lucky loser. She reached the semifinals with wins over Tamira Paszek, fourth seed Dominika Cibulková, and sixth seed Lucie Šafářová. In the semifinals, Bertens faced top-seeded Sara Errani. Errani led 5–0 in the first set when Bertens retired due to a back injury.

At the 2014 French Open, she reached the fourth round as a qualifier in which she was defeated in three sets by Andrea Petkovic.

In 2015, she changed coaches from Christiaan de Jong to Raemon Sluiter.

=== 2016: WTA Tour title and a major semifinal ===
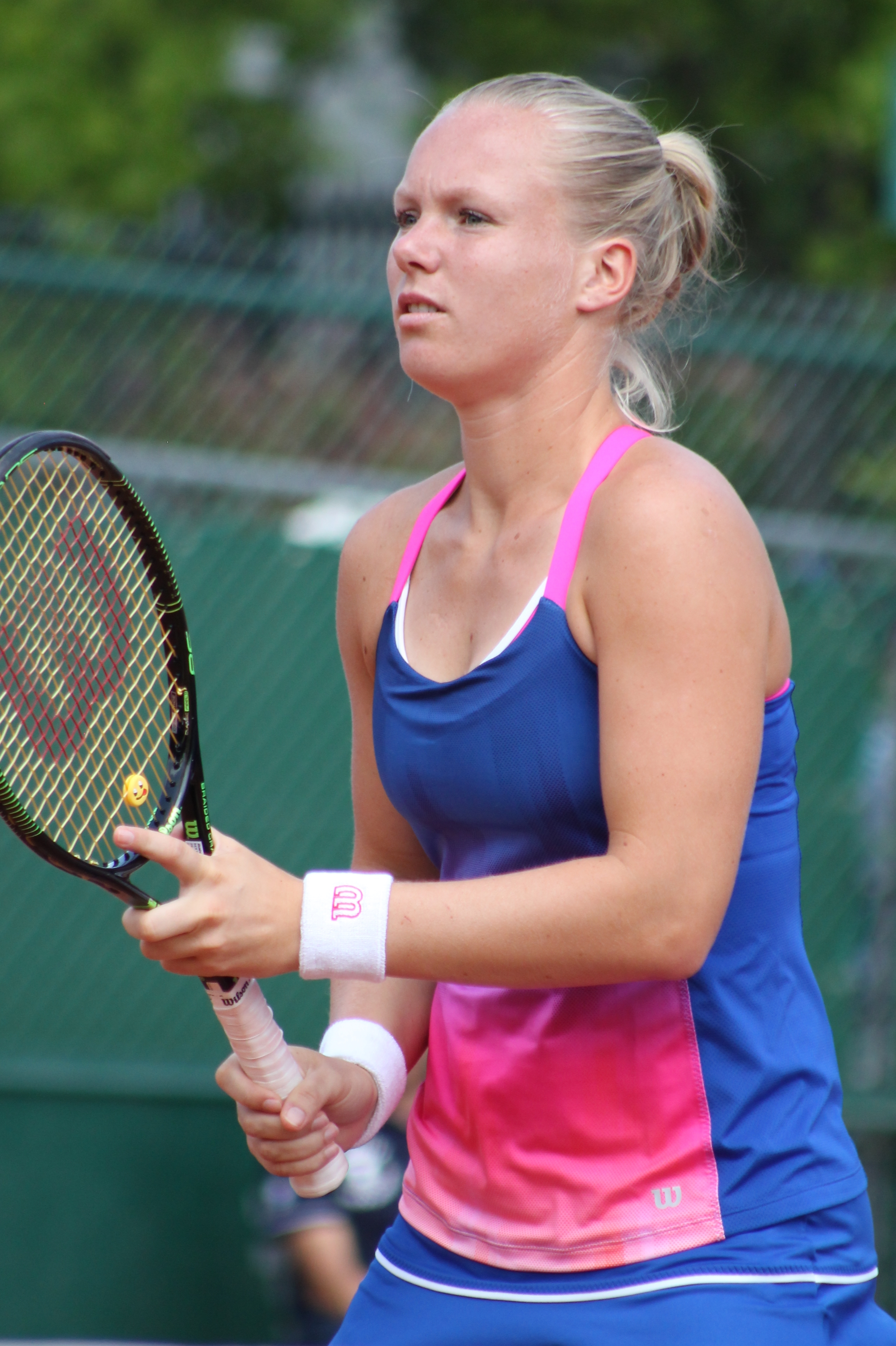
Bertens at the 2016 French Open, where she reached her first Grand Slam semifinal

Bertens started the year in Auckland, where she entered the main draw as a qualifier. She lost in the first round to Barbora Strýcová. At the Hobart International, she reached the quarterfinal, losing there to Dominika Cibulková. She lost in the first round of the Australian Open to Laura Siegemund.

Bertens then earned two important wins in the Fed Cup tie against Russia, beating Ekaterina Makarova and Svetlana Kuznetsova. They ended up beating the 2015 finalists. After that, Bertens had early defeats in Acapulco (losing to Naomi Osaka in the first round) and in Monterrey (losing in the last round of the qualifying to Pauline Parmentier). After entering Indian Wells' main draw as a qualifier, she lost in the first round to CoCo Vandeweghe. Prior to the Miami Open, she played at the San Antonio Open where she reached the round of 16. Then, in Miami, she once again reached the main draw through qualifying and earned wins over Zheng Saisai and No. 25 seed Anastasia Pavlyuchenkova before retiring in the third set in her third-round match against Angelique Kerber.

Playing for the Netherlands at the Fed Cup semifinals against France, Bertens kept her winning streak by beating Caroline Garcia and Kristina Mladenovic, both in straight sets; nonetheless, it was not enough as France won the tie in the doubles decider. After that, she started her clay-court season with a semifinals run in Rabat, only losing to Marina Erakovic.

At Nuremberg, Bertens won her second WTA singles title by defeating Mariana Duque Mariño in the final in straight sets. In the second round, she had defeated top-seeded Roberta Vinci which was her first win against a top-10 player. And it was her first title since 2012. She also won the doubles title alongside Johanna Larsson.

At the French Open, Bertens avenged her Miami loss by upsetting No. 3 seed Angelique Kerber in three sets. She then beat Camila Giorgi, 29th seed Daria Kasatkina, 15th seed Madison Keys, and No. 8 seed Timea Bacsinszky en route to her first Grand Slam semifinal. In her semifinal match against the top seed Serena Williams, Kiki played with a left calf injury which made it difficult for her to move forward to Williams' drop shots. Bertens never took advantage of a medical time-out or took trainer treatment. Despite having two set points and being up by a break in both sets, she lost in straight sets. However, she entered the top 30 for the first time in her career.

Prior to Wimbledon, Bertens was scheduled to play at the Rosmalen Open; due to the same injury that harmed her left calf, she was forced to pull out of the tournament. After a few weeks of recovery, Bertens kicked off her campaign at the third Grand Slam event of the year and defeated Jeļena Ostapenko and Mona Barthel to reach the third round of the grass tournament for the first time. She then lost to Simona Halep.

Her next tournament was the inaugural Ladies Championship Gstaad, where she reached the final. She lost one set to Tamira Paszek en route. In the final, Bertens lost in three sets to Viktorija Golubic. Despite the defeat, she climbed to No. 21 in the rankings.

Despite winning her second title of her career this year and making it to the semifinals of the French Open, Bertens lost in the first round of six straight tournaments, notably including the Rio Olympics and US Open. As a result of her inconsistency, she decided not to compete at the Wuhan Open and China Open. She made her return at the Linz Open. However, she lost in the first round to Sorana Cîrstea but won the doubles with Johanna Larsson. Her next event was the Luxembourg Open. She had her best result since Wimbledon by making it to the semifinals, losing to Monica Niculescu. However, she did not go home empty handed. Bertens and Larsson won their second doubles title in a row. Bertens ended her season at the WTA Elite Trophy where she lost both of her matches with close scorelines, against Elina Svitolina and Elena Vesnina.

=== 2017: Two WTA titles, Tour Championships doubles final ===
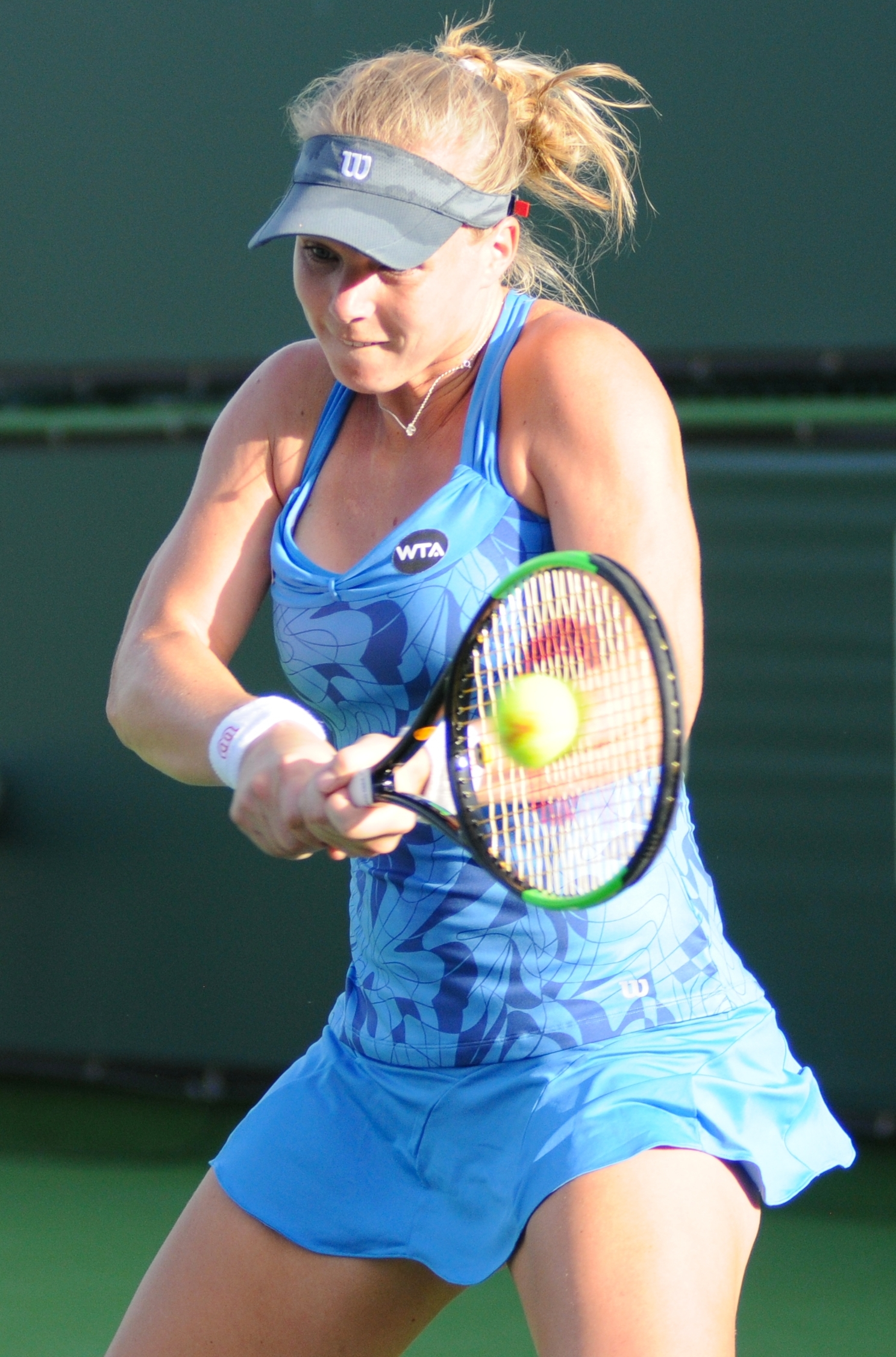
Bertens at the 2017 Indian Wells Open

Bertens started her year off with a first-round loss to Lauren Davis at Auckland. However, Bertens and Larsson won the doubles title. Kiki was seeded first at Hobart. She had routine wins over Annika Beck and Galina Voskoboeva in the first two rounds, but lost to qualifier and eventual champion Elise Mertens. She continued to struggle during her next four tournaments, and lost in the first round of all of them including the Australian Open.

She then traveled to the United States for the Indian Wells and Miami Open, and lost to Timea Bacsinszky at Indian Wells in a hard-fought three-setter, and in the second round in Miami to qualifier Risa Ozaki.

Bertens had a strong start into clay-court season. She reached the third round of both the Charleston Open and the Copa Colsanitas, then lost in the first round of the Porsche Grand Prix. However, she made it to the quarterfinals of the Madrid Open, defeating former top-ten players Makarova and Bacsinszky along the way, before losing to Anastasija Sevastova. Bertens had an even more impressive journey during the Italian Open where she made it to the semifinals, eventually losing to Simona Halep. She defended her title in Nuremberg by defeating Barbora Krejčíková in the final – her third career singles title. After a strong showing during the clay-court season, she entered the French Open and beat Ajla Tomljanović in the first round, but was upset by CiCi Bellis in the second.

Bertens started the grass-court season with two straight first-round losses at the Rosmalen Open and Mallorca Open. The Wimbledon Championships proved to be unsuccessful as well as she lost in the first round to Sorana Cîrstea. After a disappointing French Open and Wimbledon, Bertens rebounded at Gstaad where she claimed the title by beating Anett Kontaveit in the final. She also claimed the doubles title alongside Johanna Larsson.

Bertens had a poor US Open Series as she lost in the second round of the Cincinnati Open to Johanna Konta. She followed this up with a first-round loss at the Connecticut Open in Cincinnati to qualifier Elise Mertens. She was then defeated in the first round of the US Open by Maria Sakkari, in straight sets.

At Korea Open, Bertens was seeded second, but lost in the first round against compatriot Richèl Hogenkamp. She lost in the second round of the Wuhan Open to qualifier Varvara Lepchenko, and in the first round of both the China Open and Austrian Open. After a string of early-round losses, Bertens reached the quarterfinals of the Luxembourg Open. Seeded second, she beat Denisa Allertová in the first round, in the second she beat Andrea Petkovic, but fell to the eventual winner Carina Witthöft. Bertens competed in by far her biggest final of her career at the WTA Finals with partner Johanna Larsson. They had a big win over the second seeds Ekaterina Makarova and Elena Vesnina in the semifinals. However, they lost to Tímea Babos and Andrea Hlaváčková in the final. Bertens ended the year ranked 31st, down from 22nd the year prior. However, her ranking in doubles reached a new career high at 19th.

=== 2018: First Premier and Premier 5 titles, top-10 debut ===
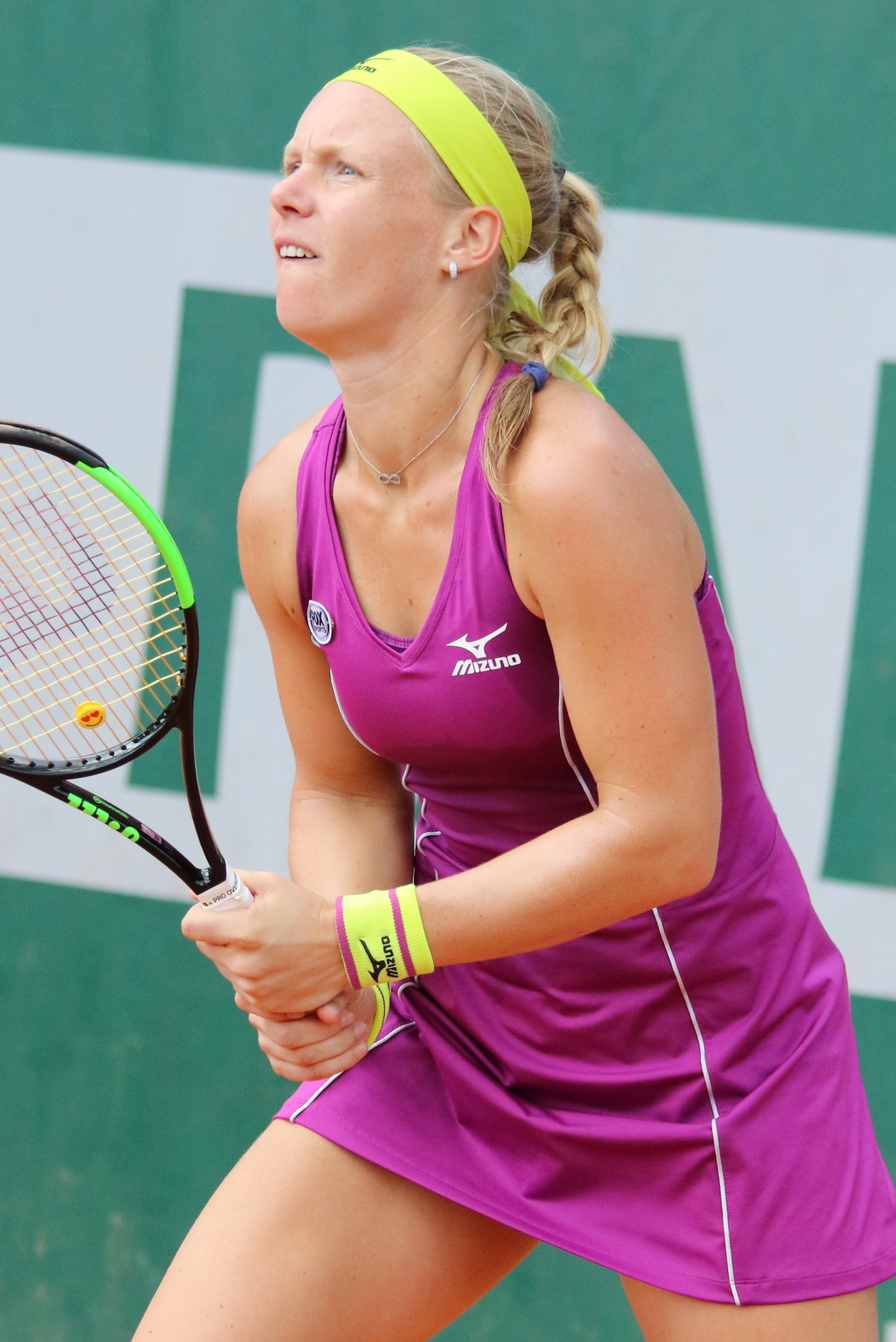
Bertens at the 2018 French Open

Bertens opened the year with a first-round loss at the Brisbane International to Ana Konjuh. However, she won the doubles title with fellow Dutch player Demi Schuurs. She followed this up by winning her first match of the year at the Sydney International over qualifier Kristie Ahn. However, she lost to the top seed Garbiñe Muguruza. At the Australian Open Bertens beat Americans CiCi Bellis and Nicole Gibbs in the first two rounds before falling to world No. 2 and eventual winner, Caroline Wozniacki.

In April, she won her first Premier title by defeating Julia Görges in straight sets in the final of the Charleston Open. At the Madrid Open, she defeated Maria Sakkari, and Anastasija Sevastova, and world No. 2, Caroline Wozniacki, in the first, second and third round respectively. In the quarterfinals, she upset Maria Sharapova. She reached her first Premier Mandatory final by defeating Caroline Garcia but fell to Petra Kvitová in the final.

At the French Open, Bertens beat Aryna Sabalenka and Aliaksandra Sasnovich easily in two sets before falling to Angelique Kerber in two tight tie-break sets. During the grass-court season, Bertens impressed at Wimbledon with wins over top players like ninth seed Venus Williams and seventh seed Karolína Plíšková. In the quarterfinals, she lost to Julia Görges but achieved a career best at Wimbledon so far by reaching the last eight.

After Wimbledon, Bertens decided not to defend her title on the clay of Gstaad. She started the hardcourt season in Montreal at the Canadian Open where she made an impressive run, beating for the first time two top-ten players on hardcourt. She defeated ninth seed Karolína Plíšková and eighth seed Petra Kvitová before losing to 15th seed Ashleigh Barty in the quarterfinals, her best performance in Montreal. The following week, she won the biggest title of her career in Cincinnati, beating top-10 players Wozniacki, Svitolina, Kvitová and Halep along the way.

In September, she defeated Ajla Tomljanović in the Korea Open final for her second hardcourt title. Bertens subsequently qualified for the WTA Finals for the first time, after Simona Halep withdrew from the tournament due to injury where she reached the semifinals, losing to the eventual winner Elina Svitolina.

Kiki Bertens was named "Most Improved Player of the Year" for 2018 by the WTA. She finished the year in the top 10 for the first time ranked No. 9 in the world.

=== 2019: Premier Mandatory title, three finals, career-high ranking ===
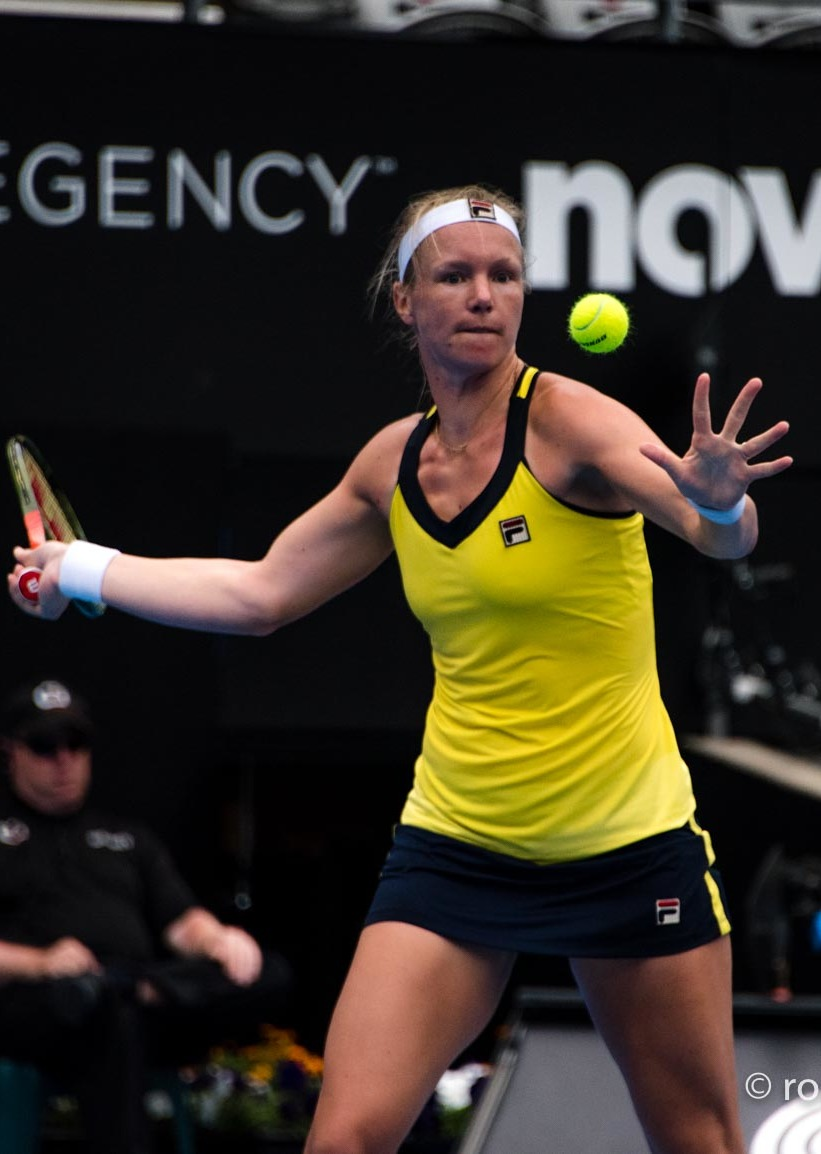
Bertens at the 2019 Sydney International

She started off her season at the Brisbane International, beating Elise Mertens and losing to Donna Vekić. The following week, she reached the semifinals in Sydney, losing to Ash Barty in three sets. At the Australian Open, she defeated Alison Riske in the first round before losing to Anastasia Pavlyuchenkova in the second. She reached her first final of the year in February, defeating Ysaline Bonaventure, Pavlyuchenkova and Aryna Sabalenka at the St. Petersburg Trophy. In the final, she beat Vekić in straight sets.

At Indian Wells, she reached the fourth round for the first time by beating Linette and Konta in straight sets, before falling to Muguruza in three long sets. Bertens went after a good run at Indian Wells to Miami where she reached the fourth round, after beating Wang Xiyu and Viktória Kužmová, before losing to eventual winner Ash Barty.

Bertens started off her clay-court season at the Charleston Open as defending champion and reached the third round before losing her match against Maria Sakkari, in straight sets. She reached the semifinals at the Porsche Grand Prix in Stuttgart, losing in three sets to Petra Kvitová. However, she bounced back at the Madrid Open, where she cruised through her first three matches against Kateřina Siniaková, Jeļena Ostapenko, and Anastasija Sevastova. In the quarterfinals, she avenged both the loss in last year's final and the loss in Stuttgart against Kvitová, beating the Czech, losing just five games. In the semifinals, she beat Sloane Stephens for the first time in her career, reaching a second consecutive Madrid final. There, she beat world No. 3, Simona Halep, in straight sets, winning her first Premier Mandatory title, beating four former Grand Slam champions along the way and becoming the first to win Madrid without dropping a set. By doing so, she reached a new career-high ranking of world No. 4. She reached the semifinals at Rome, defeating the world No. 1, Naomi Osaka, in the process, before losing to Johanna Konta. At the French Open, Bertens was forced to retire due to illness in her second-round match against Viktória Kužmová.

In the grass-court season, she reached the final of 's-Hertogenbosch, where she lost to Alison Riske. She reached the semifinals of Eastbourne, where she lost to the eventual champion, Karolína Plíšková. At Wimbledon, she reached the third round, where she lost to Barbora Strýcová. Following Wimbledon, she entered Palermo, where she reached the final, losing in three sets to Jil Teichmann.

At Toronto, she defeated Francesca Di Lorenzo in the second round, before losing to the eventual champion, Bianca Andreescu. She then lost in the second round of Cincinnati to Venus Williams. At the US Open, she defeated Paula Badosa and Anastasia Pavlyuchenkova, before losing to Julia Görges. At Zhengzhou, she lost in her first match to Ajla Tomljanović. She was defeated in her first match at Osaka by Pavlyuchenkova. She next lost in the third round of Wuhan to the defending, and eventual, champion Aryna Sabalenka, before reaching the semifinals of Beijing, defeating Donna Vekić, Dayana Yastremska, Polona Hercog, and Elina Svitolina, before losing to Ashleigh Barty. At Linz, she reached the quarterfinals, where she lost to the eventual champion Coco Gauff.

At the Moscow, she defeated Kaia Kanepi, before falling to Kristina Mladenovic. At the WTA Elite Trophy, Bertens reached the final, defeating both Vekić and Yastremska in the group stage, and Zheng Saisai in the semifinals, before losing to Sabalenka once again. At the WTA Finals, Bertens entered as an alternate following the withdrawal of Naomi Osaka due to injury. In the group stages, she won against world No. 1, Ashleigh Barty, in three sets, before retiring against Belinda Bencic. Bertens ended the year ranked No. 9 in the world.

On 1 November 2019, she announced via Instagram that Raemon Sluiter would no longer be her coach, and Elise Tamaëla, her interim coach at the time, would be her new coach.

=== 2020: St. Petersburg defense, mixed results, injury ===
Bertens' first tournament of the year was at Brisbane, where she defeated Dayana Yastremska and Anett Kontaveit, before falling to Naomi Osaka. At the Australian Open she reached the fourth round where she lost to eventual runner-up Garbiñe Muguruza, in straight sets. She next won both her matches at the Fed Cup, defeating Aryna Sabalenka and Aliaksandra Sasnovich. She next defended her title at St. Petersburg, defeating Veronika Kudermetova, Anastasia Potapova, Ekaterina Alexandrova, and Elena Rybakina. At Doha, she defeated Karolína Muchová, before losing to Zheng Saisai; this was her final tournament before the WTA Tour was suspended due to the COVID-19 pandemic.

Choosing to skip the US Open, Bertens' first tournament was at Rome, where she was defeated in the second round by Polona Hercog. She also lost in her first match at Strasbourg by Jeļena Ostapenko. At Roland Garros, she reached the fourth round, defeating Sara Errani in three tight sets in the second round which saw her leaving the court in a wheelchair. After the match, Errani accused Bertens of faking her injury. Bertens subsequently fell to another Italian player Martina Trevisan in the fourth round and announced the following month that she would undergo surgery to treat an Achilles tendon injury, sidelining her for the remainder of the season.

Bertens ended the year ranked No. 9 in the world for the second year in a row.

=== 2021: Loss of form and retirement ===
Bertens was sidelined for the start of the 2021 season, following surgery on her Achilles tendon at the end of 2020. Her first tournament after recovery from her surgery was at the Qatar Total Open. Seeded fifth, she lost in the first round to Jeļena Ostapenko. Seeded fifth at the Dubai Championships, she was defeated in the second round by Tereza Martincová. Seeded tenth in Miami, she lost in the second round to qualifier Liudmila Samsonova. Playing for the Netherlands in the Fed Cup tie against China, she beat Wang Xinyu. The Netherlands ended up winning the tie 3–2.

Seeded seventh and the defending champion in Madrid, Bertens was defeated in the second round by Veronika Kudermetova. As a result, her ranking dropped to No. 17. Seeded 16th at the French Open, she lost in the first round to Polona Hercog; her ranking dropped further to No. 20 on 14 June 2021. This marked her first time outside the top 20 since June 2018. She then announced on 16 June 2021 that 2021 will be her final season, citing an inability to continue to compete to the highest level due to injuries, and that she would either retire following the Olympics, or at the end of the season.

At the Eastbourne International, Bertens was defeated in the first round by lucky loser Shelby Rogers. Seeded 17th at Wimbledon, she lost in the first round to Marta Kostyuk.

Bertens later clarified that she would end her career at the Olympic Games. Seeded 16th, she was defeated in the first round by eventual silver medalist Markéta Vondroušová. Her final tournament was the doubles draw at the same event, where she partnered Demi Schuurs. They won their first-round match against French pair Kristina Mladenovic and Caroline Garcia, in three sets, then lost to Elena Vesnina and Veronika Kudermetova, also in three sets. Bertens retired from the tour ranked No. 24 in singles and 112 in doubles.

== Playing style ==
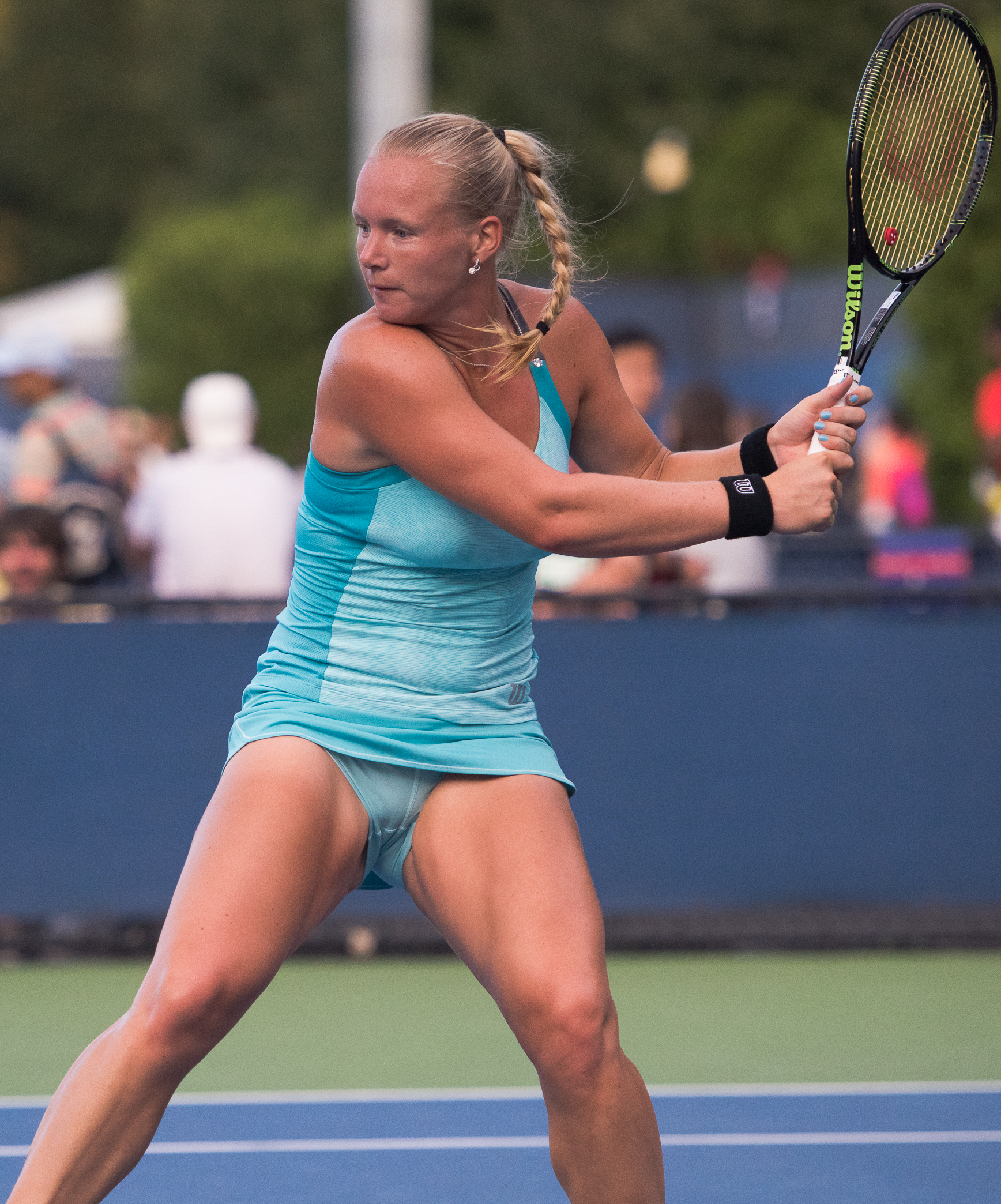
Bertens preparing to hit a backhand

Bertens was a baseline player, who was noted for her ability to combine her exceptional defensive skills with an aggressive mindset. As she played aggressively, taking the ball early on the rise, she tended to hit large numbers of both winners and unforced errors. Bertens' greatest asset was her forehand, which was powerful and hit with heavy topspin, allowing her to hit winners from any position on the court. Her heavy topspin forehand had the added benefit of pushing her opponents behind the baseline, forcing them to play defensively from the first stroke. Her two-handed backhand was also strong, and she was able to dictate play using this stroke; despite this, her backhand was less reliable than her forehand, and her backhand was responsible for the majority of the unforced errors she committed on the court. She was adept at applying slice to her backhand, which allowed her to break up the pace of baseline rallies, and draw unforced errors from more aggressive players. Her first serve was powerful, typically being delivered at 105 mph (169 km/h), and peaking at 110 mph (177 km/h), allowing her to serve aces, and dictate play from the first stroke of the rally. Bertens' second serve was less reliable, leading to a relatively high double fault count; throughout her career, however, Bertens began to develop a more effective kick serve, which minimised double faults. Despite being an effective net player due to her doubles experience, Bertens rarely approached the net when playing singles, except to retrieve short balls, or to attack the net when the opportunity arose. Bertens possessed an exemplary drop shot, and was one of the strongest exponents of this shot on the WTA Tour; this shot was especially effective on clay courts, where she would deploy the shot during long baseline exchanges, to surprise opponents and move them around the court. Due to her exceptional fitness, movement, fitness, footwork, and court coverage, Bertens was an adept counterpuncher, and these skills allowed her to execute her playing style with tremendous effect. Although Bertens experienced success on all surfaces, her favourite surface was clay, where the high bounce and slow speed suited her playing style; her clay court game was aided by her ability to slide and move effectively on the surface. Despite all these strengths, Bertens' game was heavily affected by nerves throughout her career, and her lack of Grand Slam success despite being one of the most consistent players on the WTA Tour was credited to the nerves she felt when playing in front of large crowds.

== Personal life ==
Bertens' older sister, Joyce, works as a business consultant and helps manage her finances. Bertens married her physiotherapist, Remko de Rijke, on 30 November 2019. She announced her pregnancy in October 2021 and had her first child, Mats, April 3, 2022. She gave birth to her second child, a girl, on June 28, 2024.

On retirement, Bertens reflected on her personality "From a shy little girl, with lots of fears to an independent woman who played on the biggest stages," she wrote in July. "It's time to say goodbye now. Thanks to this beautiful sport I have learnt so much about myself, about the world and I have met so many incredible people. I will take this forever with me."

== Career statistics ==
Key
W	F	SF	QF	#R	RR	Q#	P#	DNQ	A	Z#	PO	G	S	B	NMS	NTI	P	NH

(W) winner; (F) finalist; (SF) semifinalist; (QF) quarterfinalist; (#R) rounds 4, 3, 2, 1; (RR) round-robin stage; (Q#) qualification round; (P#) preliminary round; (DNQ) did not qualify; (A) absent; (Z#) Davis/Fed Cup Zonal Group (with number indication) or (PO) play-off; (G) gold, (S) silver or (B) bronze Olympic/Paralympic medal; (NMS) not a Masters tournament; (NTI) not a Tier I tournament; (P) postponed; (NH) not held; (SR) strike rate (events won / competed); (W–L) win–loss record.
To avoid confusion and double counting, these charts are updated at the conclusion of a tournament or when the player's participation has ended.

=== Grand Slam performance timelines ===
==== Singles ====
Tournament	2011	2012	2013	2014	2015	2016	2017	2018	2019	2020	2021	SR	W–L
Australian Open	A	Q2	1R	1R	2R	1R	1R	3R	2R	4R	A	0 / 8	7–8
French Open	Q1	1R	1R	4R	1R	SF	2R	3R	2R	4R	1R	0 / 10	15–10
Wimbledon	A	2R	1R	Q1	1R	3R	1R	QF	3R	NH	1R	0 / 8	9–8
US Open	Q1	2R	1R	1R	2R	1R	1R	3R	3R	A	A	0 / 8	6–8
Win–loss	0–0	2–3	0–4	3–3	2–4	7–4	1–4	10–4	6–4	6–2	0–2	0 / 34	37–34

==== Doubles ====
Tournament	2012	2013	2014	2015	2016	2017	2018	...	2021	SR	W–L
Australian Open	A	1R	1R	QF	1R	2R	1R		A	0 / 6	4–6
French Open	1R	1R	A	1R	QF	3R	3R		A	0 / 6	7–6
Wimbledon	A	A	A	1R	2R	1R	3R		1R	0 / 5	3–5
US Open	1R	2R	1R	3R	2R	3R	2R		A	0 / 7	7–7
Win–loss	0–2	1–3	0–2	5–4	5–4	5–4	5–4		0–1	0 / 24	21–24
