= Yulia Putintseva career statistics =

Career finals
Discipline	Type	Won	Lost	Total
Singles	Grand Slam	–	–	–
Singles	WTA Finals	–	–	–
Singles	WTA 1000	–	–	–
Singles	WTA Tour	3	3	6
Singles	Olympics	–	–	–
Singles	Total	3	3	6
Doubles	Grand Slam	–	–	–
Doubles	WTA Finals	–	–	–
Doubles	WTA 1000	–	–	–
Doubles	WTA Tour	–	–	–
Doubles	Olympics	–	–	–
Doubles	Total	–	–	–

This is a list of the main career statistics of the Kazakh professional tennis player Yulia Putintseva.

== Career achievements ==
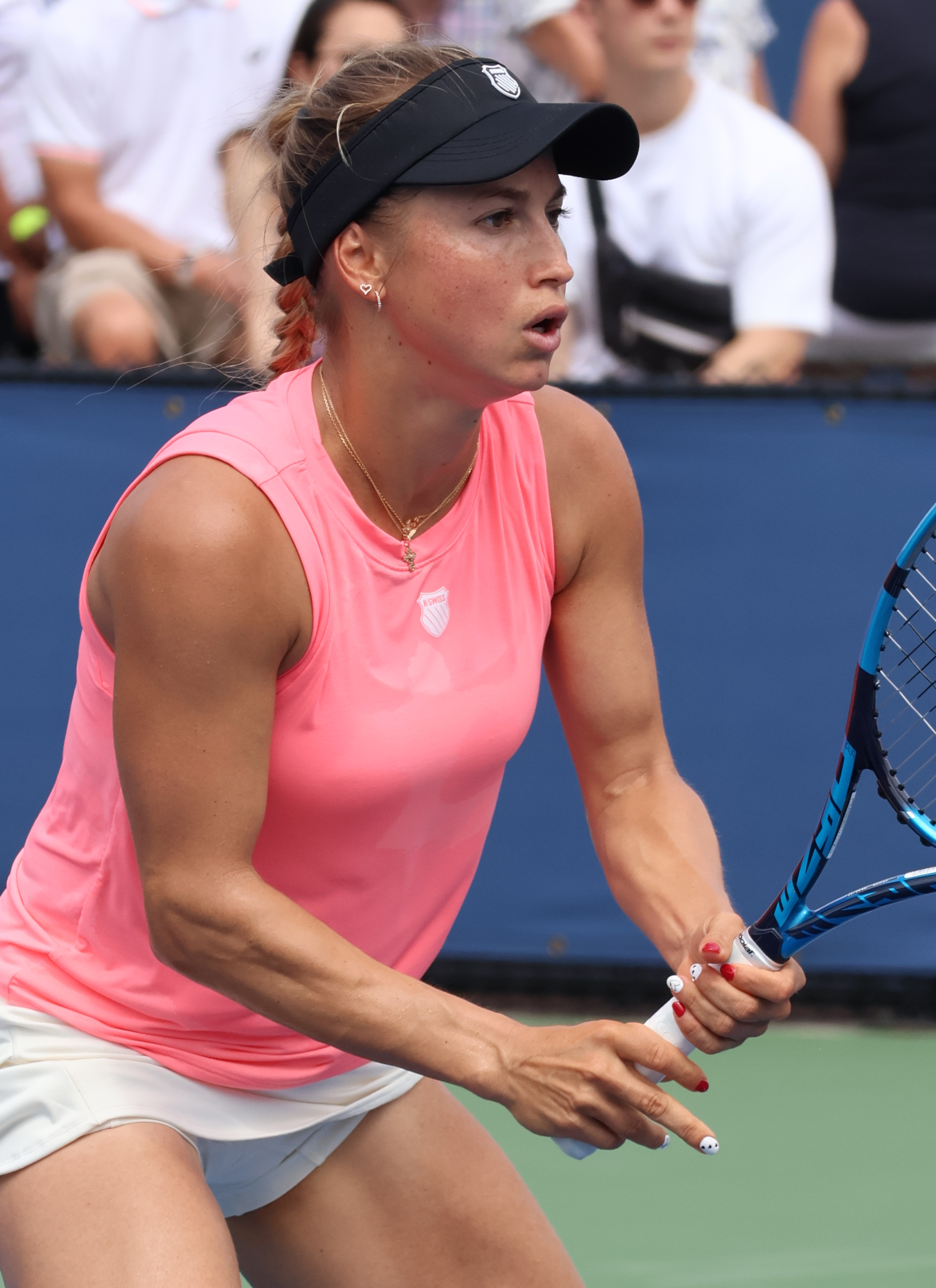
Putintseva at the 2023 US Open

Putintseva has won three WTA Tour singles titles, the 2019 Nuremberg Cup, the 2021 Budapest Grand Prix and the 2024 Birmingham Classic . She has reached three Grand Slam quarterfinals, two of them at the French Open (2016 and 2018) and one at the US Open (2020). She has also reached one Premier 5 quarterfinal, at the 2020 Italian Open. Putintseva achieved her highest singles ranking of world No. 20 on 27 January 2025.

== Performance timelines ==
Key
W	F	SF	QF	#R	RR	Q#	P#	DNQ	A	Z#	PO	G	S	B	NMS	NTI	P	NH

(W) winner; (F) finalist; (SF) semifinalist; (QF) quarterfinalist; (#R) rounds 4, 3, 2, 1; (RR) round-robin stage; (Q#) qualification round; (P#) preliminary round; (DNQ) did not qualify; (A) absent; (Z#) Davis/Fed Cup Zonal Group (with number indication) or (PO) play-off; (G) gold, (S) silver or (B) bronze Olympic/Paralympic medal; (NMS) not a Masters tournament; (NTI) not a Tier I tournament; (P) postponed; (NH) not held; (SR) strike rate (events won / competed); (W–L) win–loss record.
To avoid confusion and double counting, these charts are updated at the conclusion of a tournament or when the player's participation has ended.

Only main-draw results in WTA Tour, Grand Slam tournaments, Billie Jean King Cup (Fed Cup), United Cup, Hopman Cup and Olympic Games are included in win–loss records.

=== Singles ===
Current through the 2026 Italian Open.

Tournament	2010	2011	2012	2013	2014	2015	2016	2017	2018	2019	2020	2021	2022	2023	2024	2025	2026	SR	W–L	Win %
Grand Slam tournaments
Australian Open	A	A	A	2R	1R	1R	3R	2R	2R	2R	3R	3R	1R	2R	1R	3R	4R	0 / 14	16–14	53%
French Open	A	A	Q2	2R	Q3	2R	QF	3R	QF	1R	2R	1R	2R	3R	2R	3R		0 / 12	19–12	61%
Wimbledon	A	A	A	1R	A	2R	2R	1R	2R	2R	NH	2R	1R	1R	4R	1R		0 / 11	8–11	42%
US Open	A	A	Q1	A	Q2	1R	2R	2R	1R	3R	QF	1R	2R	1R	3R	2R		0 / 11	12–11	52%
Win–loss	0–0	0–0	0–0	2–3	0–1	2–4	8–4	4–4	6–4	4–4	7–3	3–4	2–4	3–4	6–4	5–4	3–1	0 / 48	55–48	53%
National representation
Summer Olympics	NH		A	NH			A	NH				1R	NH		A	NH		0 / 1	0–1	0%
Billie Jean King Cup (Note: Formerly known as Fed Cup until 2020.)	A	A	A	A	POZ1	POZ1	Z1	PO2	POZ1	PO2	QR (Note: Edition is split into the two years due to COVID-19.)		RR	RR	PO	RR		0 / 3	20–12	65%
WTA 1000 tournaments
Qatar Open	NH	NTI	A	1R	A	NTI	2R	NTI	1R	NTI	3R	NTI	1R	NTI	Q1	2R	A	0 / 6	4–6	40%
Dubai Championships	A	A	NTI			Q1	NTI	1R	NTI	1R	NTI	A	NTI	2R	Q2	1R	A	0 / 4	1–4	20%
Indian Wells Open	A	A	A	Q1	Q1	2R	3R	2R	2R	2R	NH	3R	2R	1R	4R	2R	2R	0 / 11	12–11	52%
Miami Open	A	A	A	1R	A	Q1	1R	3R	1R	4R	NH	2R	3R	1R	QF	2R	2R	0 / 11	11–11	50%
Madrid Open	A	A	A	1R	A	A	A	1R	A	3R	NH	1R	2R	2R	QF	2R	2R	0 / 9	9–9	50%
Italian Open	A	A	A	Q2	A	A	Q1	2R	Q1	2R	QF	1R	3R	2R	3R	2R	1R	0 / 9	11–9	55%
Canadian Open	A	A	A	A	2R	Q1	1R	1R	A	1R	NH	1R	QF	2R	A	1R		0 / 8	5–8	38%
Cincinnati Open	A	A	Q2	A	Q1	1R	1R	2R	Q2	2R	2R	2R	1R	Q2	3R	1R		0 / 9	6–9	40%
China Open	A	A	A	A	Q1	1R	2R	1R	1R	2R	NH			2R	2R	1R		0 / 8	3–8	27%
Wuhan Open	NH				A	Q2	2R	1R	A	1R	NH				3R	1R		0 / 5	3–5	38%
Guadalajara Open	NH												1R	A	NTI			0 / 1	0–1	0%
Win–loss	0–0	0–0	0–0	0–3	1–1	1–3	5–7	3–9	1–4	9–9	6–3	3–6	9–8	4–6	17–7	1–10	3–4	0 / 81	63–81	44%
Career statistics
	2010	2011	2012	2013	2014	2015	2016	2017	2018	2019	2020	2021	2022	2023	2024	2025	2026	SR	W–L	Win %
Tournaments	1	0	2	12	6	17	23	27	21	25	10	23	18	17	19	26	10	Career total: 226		
Titles	0	0	0	0	0	0	0	0	0	1	0	1	0	0	1	0	0	Career total: 3		
Finals	0	0	0	0	0	0	0	1	1	1	0	2	0	0	1	0	0	Career total: 6		
Hard win–loss	0–1	0–0	1–1	2–4	6–5	3–13	17–17	17–19	15–15	19–19	12–9	19–14	8–10	6–11	19–12	11–18	7–6	0 / 174	162–174	48%
Clay win–loss	0–0	0–0	0–1	3–5	2–1	6–4	10–4	6–6	6–5	8–4	4–2	12–8	13–7	10–7	9–4	3–5	2–3	2 / 68	94–66	59%
Grass win–loss	0–0	0–0	0–0	0–3	0–0	1–1	1–3	0–3	1–2	4–3	0–0	1–1	1–2	0–1	8–1	1–4	0–0	1 / 25	18–24	43%
Overall win–loss	0–1	0–0	1–2	5–12	8–6	10–18	28–24	23–28	22–22	31–26	16–11	32–23	22–19	16–19	35–19	15–27	11–9	3 / 269	275–266	51%
Win %	0%	–	33%	29%	57%	36%	54%	45%	50%	54%	59%	58%	54%	46%	65%	36%	37%	51%		
Year-end ranking	725	241	121	105	113	74	34	53	45	34	28	42	51	69	29	73		$10,051,187		

=== Doubles ===
Tournament	2015	2016	2017	2018	2019	2020	2021	2022	2023	2024	SR	W–L
Australian Open	A	1R	1R	1R	2R	1R	1R	1R	1R	1R	0 / 9	1–9
French Open	A	1R	1R	A	1R	1R	2R	1R	1R	1R	0 / 8	1–8
Wimbledon	A	2R	A	1R	1R	NH	2R (Note: Putintseva, alongside Kalinskaya, withdrew before their second-round match. Not counted as a loss.)	1R	1R	1R	0 / 7	2–6
US Open	1R	1R	1R	1R	3R	A	1R	1R	1R	1R	0 / 9	2–9
Win–loss	0–1	1–4	0–3	0–3	3–4	0–2	2–3	0–4	0–4	0–4	0 / 33	6–32

== WTA 1000 tournament finals ==
==== Doubles: 1 (runner-up) ====
Result	Year	Tournament	Surface	Partner	Opponents	Score
Loss	2024	Cincinnati Open	Hard	(Canada) Leylah Fernandez	(United States) Asia Muhammad (New Zealand) Erin Routliffe	6–3, 1–6, [4–10]

== WTA Tour finals ==
Putintseva debuted at the WTA Tour in October 2010 at the Luxembourg Open in singles. Since then, she reached two International and one Premier-level finals, all in singles, winning only one of them, International-level Nuremberg Cup in May 2019.

=== Singles: 6 (3 titles, 3 runner–ups) ===
Legend Premier / WTA 500 (0–1) International / WTA 250 (3–2)	Finals by surface Hard (0–3) Clay (2–0) Grass (1–0)	Finals by setting Outdoor (3–1) Indoor (0–2)

Result	W–L	Date	Tournament	Tier	Surface	Opponent	Score
Loss	0–1	Feb 2017	St. Petersburg Trophy, Russia	Premier	Hard (i)	(France) Kristina Mladenovic	2–6, 7–6^{(7–3)}, 4–6
Loss	0–2	Sep 2018	Guangzhou Open, China	International	Hard	(China) Wang Qiang	1–6, 2–6
Win	1–2	May 2019	Nuremberg Cup, Germany	International	Clay	(Slovenia) Tamara Zidanšek	4–6, 6–4, 6–2
Win	2–2	Jul 2021	Budapest Grand Prix, Hungary	WTA 250	Clay	(Ukraine) Anhelina Kalinina	6–4, 6–0
Loss	2–3	Oct 2021	Astana Open, Kazakhstan	WTA 250	Hard (i)	(Belgium) Alison Van Uytvanck	6–1, 4–6, 3–6
Win	3–3	Jun 2024	Birmingham Classic, United Kingdom	WTA 250	Grass	(Australia) Ajla Tomljanović	6–1, 7–6^{(10–8)}

=== Doubles: 2 (2 runner-ups) ===
Legend WTA 1000 (0–1) WTA 250 (0–1)	Finals by surface Hard (0–2)	Finals by setting Outdoor (0–2)

Result	W–L	Date	Tournament	Tier	Surface	Partner	Opponents	Score
Loss	0–1	Sep 2023	Japan Women's Open, Japan	WTA 250	Hard	Anna Kalinskaya	(Germany) Anna-Lena Friedsam (Ukraine) Nadiia Kichenok	6–7^{(3–7)}, 3–6
Loss	0–2	Aug 2024	Cincinnati Open, United States	WTA 1000	Hard	(Canada) Leylah Fernandez	(United States) Asia Muhammad (New Zealand) Erin Routliffe	6–3, 1–6, [4–10]

== ITF Circuit finals ==
Putintseva debuted at the ITF Women's World Tennis Tour in 2010 at the $10k event in Amiens in singles. She has been in twelve finals and won half of them, while in doubles she has not reached any final. Her biggest title on the ITF Circuit came in May 2012, at the $100k Open de Cagnes-sur-Mer.

=== Singles: 12 (6 titles, 6 runner-ups) ===
Legend W100 tournaments (1–2) W75 tournaments (0–1) W50 tournaments (2–2) W25 tournaments (3–1)	Finals by surface Hard (4–3) Clay (2–3)

Result	W–L	Date	Tournament	Tier	Surface	Opponent	Score
Win	1–0	May 2011	ITF Moscow, Russia	W25	Clay	(Ukraine) Veronika Kapshay	6–2, 6–1
Win	2–0	Jul 2011	Samsun Cup, Turkey	W25	Hard	(Poland) Marta Domachowska	7–6^{(8–6)}, 6–2
Win	3–0	Aug 2011	Tatarstan Open, Russia	W50	Hard	(France) Caroline Garcia	6–4, 6–2
Win	4–0	Dec 2011	Siberia Cup, Russia	W50	Hard (i)	(Ukraine) Elina Svitolina	6–2, 6–4
Win	5–0	Feb 2012	Launceston International, Australia	W25	Hard	(Netherlands) Lesley Kerkhove	6–1, 6–3
Win	6–0	May 2012	Open de Cagnes-sur-Mer, France	W100	Clay	(Austria) Patricia Mayr-Achleitner	6–2, 6–1
Loss	6–1	Nov 2012	Open Nantes Atlantique, France	W50	Hard (i)	(Romania) Monica Niculescu	2–6, 3–6
Loss	6–2	Dec 2012	Dubai Tennis Challenge, UAE	W75	Hard	(Japan) Kimiko Date-Krumm	1–6, 6–3, 4–6
Loss	6–3	Apr 2014	ITF Pelham, United States	W25	Clay	(Germany) Laura Siegemund	1–6, 4–6
Loss	6–4	May 2014	ITF Indian Harbour Beach, U.S.	W50	Clay	(United States) Taylor Townsend	1–6, 1–6
Loss	6–5	Jul 2015	Contrexéville Open, France	W100	Clay	(Romania) Alexandra Dulgheru	3–6, 6–1, 5–7
Loss	6–6	Nov 2015	Nanjing Ladies Open, China	W100	Hard	(Chinese Taipei) Hsieh Su-wei	6–7^{(5–7)}, 6–2, 2–6

== WTA Tour career earnings ==
Current through the 2022 Indian Wells Open

Year	Grand Slam singles titles	WTA singles titles	Total singles titles	Earnings ($)	Money list rank
2014	–	–	–	109,440	170
2015	–	–	–	327,320	97
2016	–	–	–	817,521	40
2017	–	–	–	656,423	50
2018	–	–	–	832,974	45
2019	–	1	1	931,121	45
2020	–	–	–	797,941	18
2021	–	–	–	684,401	49
2022	–	–	–	135,050	96
Career	0	1	1	5,575,878	111

== Career Grand Slam statistics ==
=== Grand Slam tournament seedings ===
The tournaments won by Putintseva are in boldface, and advanced into finals by Putintseva are in italics.

Year	Australian Open	French Open	Wimbledon	US Open
2012	A	DNQ	A	DNQ
2013	–	–	–	A
2014	–	DNQ	A	DNQ
2015	LL	–	–	–
2016	–	–	–	–
2017	31st	27th	–	–
2018	–	–	–	–
2019	–	–	–	–
2020	–	23rd	cancelled	23rd
2021	26th	–	–	31st
2022	–	–	27th	–
2023	–	–	–	–
2024	–	–	–	30th
2025	24th			

- Key: (A) absent; (Q) qualifier; (DNQ) did not qualify; (RT) retired; (NH) Not Held; (–) unseeded; (LL) lucky looser; (PR) protect ranking.

== Wins against top 10 players ==
- Putintseva has a 13–33 record against players who were, at the time the match was played, ranked in the top 10.

No.	Player	Rk	Event	Surface	Rd	Score	Rk	Years	Ref
1.	(Germany) Andrea Petkovic	10	Nuremberg Cup, Germany	Clay	1R	5–0 ret.		2015	
2.	(United States) Madison Keys	9	Pan Pacific Open, Japan	Hard	1R	6–3, 3–6, 7–6^{(9–7)}		2016	
3.	(Russia) Svetlana Kuznetsova	8	St. Petersburg Trophy, Russia	Hard	QF	6–4, 6–7^{(4–7)}, 7–5		2017	
4.	(Slovakia) Dominika Cibulková	5	St. Petersburg Trophy, Russia	Hard	SF	3–6, 6–4, 6–4		2017	
5.	(United States) Sloane Stephens	10	Nuremberg Cup, Germany	Clay	1R	5–7, 6–4, 7–6^{(7–3)}		2018	
6.	(United States) Sloane Stephens	5	Sydney International, Australia	Hard	2R	3–6, 7–6^{(7–4)}, 6–0		2019	
7.	(Japan) Naomi Osaka	1	Birmingham Classic, UK	Grass	2R	6–2, 6–3		2019	
8.	(Japan) Naomi Osaka	2	Wimbledon, United Kingdom	Grass	1R	7–6^{(7–4)}, 6–2		2019	
9.	(Spain) Garbiñe Muguruza	10	Italian Open, Italy	Clay	2R	3–6, 7–6^{(7–4)}, 6–1		2022	
10.	(Spain) Paula Badosa	3	Canadian Open, Canada	Hard	2R	7–5, 1–0, ret.		2022	
11.	(China) Zheng Qinwen	8	Madrid Open, Spain	Clay	2R	7–5, 2–0, ret.		2024	
12.	(Poland) Iga Świątek	1	Wimbledon, United Kingdom	Grass	3R	3–6, 6–1, 6–2		2024	
13.	(United States) Coco Gauff	2	Cincinnati Open, US	Hard	2R	6–4, 2–6, 6–4		2024	

- Key: (Rk) first use, opponent rank; (Rd) round; (Rk) 2nd use, player rank; (Ref) reference; (F) final; (SF) semifinal; (QF) quarterfinal; (#R) rounds 4, 3, 2, 1; (RR) round-robin stage; (Q#) qualifying rounds or stages (3), 2, 1.
