= 2012 Open GDF Suez Nantes Atlantique =

- Date: 29 October–4 November
- Edition: 10th
- Location: Nantes, France

Champions

Singles
- (Romania) Monica Niculescu

Doubles
- (Colombia) Catalina Castaño / (Bosnia and Herzegovina) Mervana Jugić-Salkić
- Open GDF Suez Nantes Atlantique

The 2012 Open GDF Suez Nantes Atlantique was a professional tennis tournament played on indoor hard courts. It was the tenth edition of the tournament which was part of the 2012 ITF Women's Circuit. It took place in Nantes, France, on 29 October–4 November 2012.

== WTA entrants ==
=== Seeds ===
Country	Player	Rank^{1}	Seed
CZE	Petra Cetkovská	56	1
ROU	Monica Niculescu	68	2
ROU	Alexandra Cadanțu	87	3
FRA	Stéphanie Foretz Gacon	101	4
ESP	Garbiñe Muguruza	102	5
CZE	Kristýna Plíšková	111	6
CZE	Karolína Plíšková	114	7
AUT	Yvonne Meusburger	115	8

- ^{1} Rankings are as of 22 October 2012.

=== Other entrants ===
The following players received wildcards into the singles main draw:

- (France) Séverine Beltrame
- (France) Iryna Brémond
- (France) Julie Coin

The following players received entry from the qualifying draw:

- (Tunisia) Ons Jabeur
- (Bosnia and Herzegovina) Mervana Jugić-Salkić
- (Poland) Magda Linette
- (Ukraine) Olga Savchuk

The following player received entry by a Protected Ranking:

- (Czech Republic) Renata Voráčová

The following player received entry by a Junior Exempt:

- (Belgium) An-Sophie Mestach

The following player received entry as a Lucky loser:

- (France) Myrtille Georges

== Champions ==
=== Singles ===
- (Romania) Monica Niculescu def. (Kazakhstan) Yulia Putintseva 6–2, 6–3.

=== Doubles ===
- (Colombia) Catalina Castaño / (Bosnia and Herzegovina) Mervana Jugić-Salkić def. (Czech Republic) Petra Cetkovská / (Czech Republic) Renata Voráčová 6–4, 6–4.
