= 2010 BGL Luxembourg Open =

- Date: 16–24 October
- Edition: 15th
- Category: WTA International
- Draw: 32S / 16D
- Prize money: $220,000
- Surface: Hard / indoor
- Location: Luxembourg, Luxembourg

Champions

Singles
- (Italy) Roberta Vinci

Doubles
- (Switzerland) Timea Bacsinszky / (Italy) Tathiana Garbin
← 2009 ·	BGL Luxembourg Open	· 2011 →

The 2010 BGL Luxembourg Open was a women's tennis tournament on indoor hard courts. It was the 15th edition of the Fortis Championships Luxembourg, and was part of the WTA International tournaments of the 2010 WTA Tour. It was held in Kockelscheuer, Luxembourg, from 16 October through 24 October 2010. Unseeded Roberta Vinci won the singles title.

== Finals ==
=== Singles ===
(Italy) Roberta Vinci defeated (Germany) Julia Görges 6–3, 6–4

- It was Vinci's first title of the year, and the third of her career.

=== Doubles ===
(Switzerland) Timea Bacsinszky / (Italy) Tathiana Garbin defeated (Czech Republic) Iveta Benešová / (Czech Republic) Barbora Záhlavová-Strýcová 6–4, 6–4

== Player commitments ==
=== Seeds ===
Country	Player	Rank^{1}	Seed
RUS	Elena Dementieva	9	1
FRA	Aravane Rezaï	15	2
BEL	Yanina Wickmayer	18	3
SRB	Ana Ivanovic	29	4
SVK	Daniela Hantuchová	30	5
SUI	Timea Bacsinszky	41	6
AUS	Jarmila Groth	42	7
GER	Julia Görges	43	8

- Seeds are based on the rankings of October 11, 2010.

=== Other entrants ===
The following players received wildcards into the singles main draw:

- (Russia) Elena Dementieva
- (Luxembourg) Mandy Minella
- (Russia) Yulia Putintseva
- (France) Virginie Razzano

The following players received entry from the qualifying draw:

- (Germany) Mona Barthel
- (Czech Republic) Lucie Hradecká
- (Croatia) Ivana Lisjak
- (Germany) Kathrin Wörle

The following player received the Lucky loser spot:

- (United States) Jill Craybas
