= 2019 Nürnberger Versicherungscup =

- Date: 20–25 May
- Edition: 7th
- Category: WTA International
- Draw: 32S / 16D
- Prize money: € 250,000
- Surface: Clay / outdoor
- Location: Nuremberg, Germany
- Venue: Tennis-Club 1. FC Nürnberg

Champions

Singles
- (Kazakhstan) Yulia Putintseva

Doubles
- (Canada) Gabriela Dabrowski / (China) Xu Yifan
- Nürnberger Versicherungscup

The 2019 Nürnberger Versicherungscup was a professional women's tennis tournament played on outdoor clay courts. It was the seventh edition of the tournament, and part of the WTA International series of the 2019 WTA Tour. It took place in Nuremberg, Germany, from 20 May until 25 May 2019. It was the last edition of the tournament in Nuremberg. First-seeded Yulia Putintseva won the singles title.

== Finals ==
=== Singles ===
(Kazakhstan) Yulia Putintseva defeated (Slovenia) Tamara Zidanšek, 4–6, 6–4, 6–2

- It was Putintseva's only doubles title of the year and the 1st of her career.

=== Doubles ===
(Canada) Gabriela Dabrowski / (China) Xu Yifan defeated (Canada) Sharon Fichman / (United States) Nicole Melichar 4–6, 7–6^{(7–5)}, [10–5]

- It was Dabrowski's only doubles title of the year and the 9th of her career. It was Xu's only doubles title of the year and the 9th of her career.

== Points and prize money ==
=== Points ===
Event	W	F	SF	QF	Round of 16	Round of 32	Q	Q2	Q1
Singles	280	180	110	60	30	1	18	12	1
Doubles	280	180	110	60	1	—N/a	—N/a	—N/a	—N/a

=== Prize money ===
Event	W	F	SF	QF	Round of 16	Round of 32	Q2	Q1
Singles	$43,000	$21,400	$11,500	$6,175	$3,400	$2,100	$1,020	$600
Doubles	$12,300	$6,400	$3,435	$1,820	$960	—N/a	—N/a	—N/a

== Singles main draw entrants ==
=== Seeds ===
Country	Player	Rank^{1}	Seed
KAZ	Yulia Putintseva	38	1
CZE	Kateřina Siniaková	45	2
AUS	Ajla Tomljanović	47	3
USA	Alison Riske	52	4
RUS	Ekaterina Alexandrova	58	5
BEL	Kirsten Flipkens	60	6
RUS	Evgeniya Rodina	68	7
GER	Andrea Petkovic	69	8

- Rankings are as of May 13, 2019.

=== Other entrants ===
The following players received wildcards into the singles main draw:

- (Germany) Anna-Lena Friedsam
- (Russia) Svetlana Kuznetsova
- (Germany) Sabine Lisicki

The following players received entry from the qualifying draw:

- (Turkey) Çağla Büyükakçay
- (Slovakia) Jana Čepelová
- (Netherlands) Quirine Lemoine
- (Germany) Jule Niemeier
- (Romania) Laura-Ioana Paar
- (Serbia) Nina Stojanović

=== Withdrawals ===
- (United Kingdom) Katie Boulter → replaced by (Argentina) Paula Ormaechea
- (Russia) Margarita Gasparyan → replaced by (Japan) Misaki Doi
- (Germany) Julia Görges → replaced by (Czech Republic) Kristýna Plíšková
- (Slovenia) Polona Hercog → replaced by (Romania) Sorana Cîrstea
- (United States) Taylor Townsend → replaced by (Russia) Vitalia Diatchenko

=== Retirements ===
- (Slovenia) Dalila Jakupović (viral illness)
- (Belarus) Vera Lapko (cramping)

== Doubles main draw entrants ==
=== Seeds ===
Country	Player	Country	Player	Rank^{1}	Seed
CAN	Gabriela Dabrowski	CHN	Xu Yifan	22	1
~~GER~~	~~Anna-Lena Grönefeld~~	~~NED~~	~~Demi Schuurs~~	~~34~~	~~2~~
USA	Raquel Atawo	SLO	Katarina Srebotnik	64	3
BEL	Kirsten Flipkens	SWE	Johanna Larsson	73	4

- ^{1} Rankings as of May 13, 2019.

=== Other entrants ===
The following pairs received wildcards into the doubles main draw:

- (Germany) Katharina Gerlach / (Germany) Julia Wachaczyk
- (Germany) Katharina Hobgarski / (Germany) Jule Niemeier

The following pair received entry as alternates:

- (Uzbekistan) Akgul Amanmuradova / (Russia) Valentina Ivakhnenko

=== Withdrawals ===
Before the tournament

- (Germany) Anna-Lena Grönefeld
