= 2012 BGL Luxembourg Open – Singles =

Singles
- 2012 BGL Luxembourg Open

Final
- Champion: (United States) Venus Williams
- Runner-up: (Romania) Monica Niculescu
- Score: 6–2, 6–3

Details
- Seeds: 8

Events
Singles	Doubles
- BGL Luxembourg Open

Victoria Azarenka was the defending champion but decided not to participate.
Venus Williams won the title, defeating Monica Niculescu 6–2 6–3.

== Seeds ==
1. (Italy) Roberta Vinci (quarterfinals)
2. (Germany) Julia Görges (second round)
3. (Serbia) Jelena Janković (second round)
4. (Belgium) Yanina Wickmayer (withdrew due to a knee injury)
5. (Germany) Sabine Lisicki (first round)
6. (Romania) Sorana Cîrstea (second round)
7. (Austria) Tamira Paszek (first round)
8. (Spain) Carla Suárez Navarro (first round)
9. (Germany) Mona Barthel (second round)

== Main draw ==
Key

- Q = Qualifier
- WC = Wild card
- LL = Lucky loser
- Alt = Alternate
- ITF = ITF entry
- PR = Protected ranking
- SR = Special ranking
- SE = Special exempt
- JE = Junior exempt
- JR = Junior Accelerator Programme entrant
- CO = College Accelerator Programme entrant
- NG = Next Gen Accelerator Program entrant
- w/o = Walkover
- r = Retired
- d = Defaulted

=== Finals ===
Semifinals
(United States) Venus Williams	5	6	6
PR	(Germany) Andrea Petkovic	7	4	4
(Slovakia) Daniela Hantuchová	1	3
(Romania) Monica Niculescu	6	6

Final
(United States) Venus Williams	6	6
(Romania) Monica Niculescu	2	3

=== Top half ===
First round
1	(Italy) R Vinci	6	2	6
(Belarus) O Govortsova	0	6	0
(Netherlands) K Bertens	2	2
LL	(United Kingdom) A Keothavong	6	6
(United States) V Williams	6	6
WC	(Switzerland) B Bencic	3	1
WC	(Luxembourg) M Minella	5	0
9	(Germany) M Barthel	7	6
3	(Serbia) J Janković	3
(China) S Peng	0^{r}
PR	(Germany) A Petkovic	4	6	6
Q	(Spain) G Muguruza	6	2	1
Q	(Russia) V Dushevina	3	6^{2}
(Kazakhstan) K Pervak	6	7^{7}
(Croatia) P Martić	2	2
6	(Romania) S Cîrstea	6	6

Second round
1	(Italy) R Vinci	6	6
LL	(United Kingdom) A Keothavong	4	1
(United States) V Williams	7^{7}	6
9	(Germany) M Barthel	6^{4}	4
3	(Serbia) J Janković	5	0
PR	(Germany) A Petkovic	7	6
(Kazakhstan) K Pervak	7^{7}	6
6	(Romania) S Cîrstea	6^{4}	1

Quarterfinals
1	(Italy) R Vinci	6^{2}	4
(United States) V Williams	7^{7}	6
PR	(Germany) A Petkovic	6	6
(Kazakhstan) K Pervak	3	2

Semifinals
(United States) V Williams	5	6	6
PR	(Germany) A Petkovic	7	4	4

=== Bottom half ===
First round
8	(Spain) C Suárez Navarro	6^{2}	4
(Slovakia) M Rybáriková	7^{7}	6
Q	(Germany) T Malek	6^{3}	1
(Spain) L Domínguez Lino	7^{7}	6
(Netherlands) A Rus	6	4	1
(Slovakia) D Hantuchová	3	6	6
WC	(Belgium) K Flipkens	3	6	6
5	(Germany) S Lisicki	6	3	1
7	(Austria) T Paszek	3	6^{8}
(Czech Republic) L Hradecká	6	7^{10}
(Czech Republic) B Záhlavová-Strýcová	7	6^{2}	2
Q	(Germany) A Beck	5	7^{7}	6
(Romania) M Niculescu	7^{7}	6
(Switzerland) R Oprandi	6^{4}	1
(Spain) S Soler Espinosa	2	1
2	(Germany) J Görges	6	6

Second round
(Slovakia) M Rybáriková	2	3
(Spain) L Domínguez Lino	6	6
(Slovakia) D Hantuchová	6	4	6
WC	(Belgium) K Flipkens	4	6	2
(Czech Republic) L Hradecká	6	6
Q	(Germany) A Beck	1	1
(Romania) M Niculescu	6	6
2	(Germany) J Görges	4	2

Quarterfinals
(Spain) L Domínguez Lino	5	0
(Slovakia) D Hantuchová	7	6
(Czech Republic) L Hradecká	0	4
(Romania) M Niculescu	6	6

Semifinals
(Slovakia) D Hantuchová	1	3
(Romania) M Niculescu	6	6

== Qualifying ==
=== Seeds ===
1. (Romania) Irina-Camelia Begu (second round, retired)
2. (Czech Republic) Andrea Hlaváčková (second round)
3. (Spain) Lara Arruabarrena Vecino (second round)
4. (United Kingdom) Anne Keothavong (qualifying competition, lucky loser)
5. (Spain) Garbiñe Muguruza (qualified)
6. (Germany) Tatjana Malek (qualified)
7. (Germany) Annika Beck (qualified)
8. (Russia) Vera Dushevina (qualified)

=== Qualifiers ===
1. (Spain) Garbiñe Muguruza
2. (Germany) Annika Beck
3. (Germany) Tatjana Malek
4. (Russia) Vera Dushevina

=== Lucky loser ===
1. (United Kingdom) Anne Keothavong

=== Draw ===
==== First qualifier ====
First round
(Russia) Irina Khromacheva	3	7	6
(Netherlands) Bibiane Schoofs	6	5	4
(Slovenia) Petra Rampre	5	2
(United Kingdom) Johanna Konta	7	6
(United States) Bethanie Mattek-Sands
5	(Spain) Garbiñe Muguruza	w/o

Second round
1	(Romania) Irina-Camelia Begu	3	1^{r}
(Russia) Irina Khromacheva	6	3
(United Kingdom) Johanna Konta	6	3	5
5	(Spain) Garbiñe Muguruza	4	6	7

Qualifying competition
(Russia) Irina Khromacheva	3	1
5	(Spain) Garbiñe Muguruza	6	6

==== Second qualifier ====
First round
(Germany) Anna-Lena Friedsam	6	6
(United States) Jennifer Elie	1	0
(Slovenia) Andreja Klepač	3	5
(Czech Republic) Eva Birnerová	6	7
(Bosnia and Herzegovina) Mervana Jugić-Salkić	4	3
7	(Germany) Annika Beck	6	6

Second round
2	(Czech Republic) Andrea Hlaváčková	3	6	6^{5}
(Germany) Anna-Lena Friedsam	6	3	7^{7}
(Czech Republic) Eva Birnerová	3	0
7	(Germany) Annika Beck	6	6

Qualifying competition
(Germany) Anna-Lena Friedsam	6	4	1
7	(Germany) Annika Beck	1	6	6

==== Third qualifier ====
First round
3	(Spain) Lara Arruabarrena Vecino	7^{7}	6
(United States) Madison Brengle	6^{5}	2
(France) Aravane Rezaï	4	6	7
(Russia) Marina Melnikova	6	1	5
(United States) Mallory Burdette	5	6	3
(Czech Republic) Tereza Smitková	7	3	6
WC	(United States) Tori Kinard	3	4
6	(Germany) Tatjana Malek	6	6

Second round
3	(Spain) Lara Arruabarrena Vecino	2	5
(France) Aravane Rezaï	6	7
(Czech Republic) Tereza Smitková	3	4
6	(Germany) Tatjana Malek	6	6

Qualifying competition
(France) Aravane Rezaï	1	6^{6}
6	(Germany) Tatjana Malek	6	7^{8}

==== Fourth qualifier ====
First round
4	(United Kingdom) Anne Keothavong	7	1	6
(Czech Republic) Sandra Záhlavová	5	6	2
WC	(Luxembourg) Laura Correia	1	1
(Bosnia and Herzegovina) Jasmina Tinjić	6	6
WC	(Luxembourg) Claudine Schaul	4	4
(Germany) Kim Grajdek	6	6
(Colombia) Catalina Castaño	6	4	1
8	(Russia) Vera Dushevina	3	6	6

Second round
4	(United Kingdom) Anne Keothavong	6	7
(Bosnia and Herzegovina) Jasmina Tinjić	2	5
(Germany) Kim Grajdek	2	1
8	(Russia) Vera Dushevina	6	6

Qualifying competition
4	(United Kingdom) Anne Keothavong	4	3
8	(Russia) Vera Dushevina	6	6
