= 2011 BGL Luxembourg Open – Singles =

Singles
- 2011 BGL Luxembourg Open

Final
- Champions: (Belarus) Victoria Azarenka
- Runners-up: (Romania) Monica Niculescu
- Score: 6–2, 6–2

Details
- Seeds: 8

Events
Singles	Doubles
- BGL Luxembourg Open

Roberta Vinci was the defending champion, but chose to compete at the Kremlin Cup instead.

First Seed Victoria Azarenka won the tournament beating unseeded Monica Niculescu in the final, 6–2, 6–2.

== Seeds ==
1. (Belarus) Victoria Azarenka (champion)
2. (Russia) Anastasia Pavlyuchenkova (first round)
3. (Germany) Sabine Lisicki (withdrew due to illness)
4. (Italy) Flavia Pennetta (first round)
5. (Serbia) Ana Ivanovic (second round)
6. (Germany) Julia Görges (semifinals)
7. (Russia) Maria Kirilenko (second round, withdrew due to an ankle injury)
8. (Slovakia) Daniela Hantuchová (first round)

== Draw ==
Key

- Q = Qualifier
- WC = Wild card
- LL = Lucky loser
- Alt = Alternate
- ITF = ITF entry
- PR = Protected ranking
- SR = Special ranking
- SE = Special exempt
- JE = Junior exempt
- JR = Junior Accelerator Programme entrant
- CO = College Accelerator Programme entrant
- NG = Next Gen Accelerator Program entrant
- w/o = Walkover
- r = Retired
- d = Defaulted

=== Finals ===
Semifinals
1	(Belarus) Victoria Azarenka	6	6
6	(Germany) Julia Görges	3	3
(Romania) Monica Niculescu	7	4	6
Q	(United Kingdom) Anne Keothavong	5	6	3

Final
1	(Belarus) Victoria Azarenka	6	6
(Romania) Monica Niculescu	2	2

=== Top half ===
First round
1	(Belarus) V Azarenka	6	6
(Czech Republic) B Záhlavová-Strýcová	2	4
(Italy) A Brianti	6	1	6
(Georgia (country)) A Tatishvili	3	6	3
(France) P Parmentier	6	3	2
(Czech Republic) I Benešová	3	6	6
(Spain) C Suárez Navarro	6^{5}	6	0^{r}
7	(Russia) M Kirilenko	7^{7}	3	3
4	(Italy) F Pennetta	3	2
(Latvia) A Sevastova	6	6
(Japan) K Date-Krumm	4	5
(Romania) S Halep	6	7
(Russia) E Makarova	2	2
(Austria) T Paszek	6	6
(United Kingdom) E Baltacha	5	1
6	(Germany) J Görges	7	6

Second round
1	(Belarus) V Azarenka	6	6
(Italy) A Brianti	0	1
(Czech Republic) I Benešová	w/o
7	(Russia) M Kirilenko
(Latvia) A Sevastova	6	6
(Romania) S Halep	2	2
(Austria) T Paszek	4	2
6	(Germany) J Görges	6	6

Quarterfinals
1	(Belarus) V Azarenka	6	6
(Czech Republic) I Benešová	3	2
(Latvia) A Sevastova	2^{r}
6	(Germany) J Görges	5

Semifinals
1	(Belarus) V Azarenka	6	6
6	(Germany) J Görges	3	3

=== Bottom half ===
First round
8	(Slovakia) D Hantuchová	7^{7}	5	1
LL	(Czech Republic) L Hradecká	6^{3}	7	6
(Belarus) A Yakimova	1	4
Q	(Romania) A Cadanțu	6	6
WC	(Luxembourg) A Kremer	0	0
(Spain) A Medina Garrigues	6	6
(Romania) M Niculescu	6^{2}	7	7^{7}
Q	(Italy) K Knapp	7^{7}	5	6^{3}
5	(Serbia) A Ivanovic	7^{7}	6
(France) V Razzano	6^{2}	4
Q	(United Kingdom) A Keothavong	6	1	6
WC	(Luxembourg) M Minella	3	6	3
WC	(Germany) A Kerber	6	2	1
Q	(Netherlands) B Schoofs	2	6	6
(Canada) R Marino	1	6	6
2	(Russia) A Pavlyuchenkova	6	3	3

Second round
LL	(Czech Republic) L Hradecká	6	6
Q	(Romania) A Cadanțu	3	4
(Spain) A Medina Garrigues	6^{5}	6	1
(Romania) M Niculescu	7^{7}	3	6
5	(Serbia) A Ivanovic	3	2
Q	(United Kingdom) A Keothavong	6	6
Q	(Netherlands) B Schoofs	1	6	7
(Canada) R Marino	6	1	5

Quarterfinals
LL	(Czech Republic) L Hradecká	4	4
(Romania) M Niculescu	6	6
Q	(United Kingdom) A Keothavong	6	6
Q	(Netherlands) B Schoofs	3	2

Semifinals
(Romania) M Niculescu	7	4	6
Q	(United Kingdom) A Keothavong	5	6	3
