= 2009 BGL Luxembourg Open =

- Date: 17–25 October
- Edition: 14th
- Category: WTA International
- Draw: 32S / 16D
- Prize money: $220,000
- Surface: Hard / indoor
- Location: Kockelscheuer, Luxembourg

Champions

Singles
- (Switzerland) Timea Bacsinszky

Doubles
- (Czech Republic) Iveta Benešová / (Czech Republic) Barbora Záhlavová-Strýcová
← 2008 ·	BGL Luxembourg Open	· 2010 →

The 2009 BGL Luxembourg Open was a women's tennis tournament on indoor hard courts. It was the 14th edition of the Fortis Championships Luxembourg, and was part of the WTA International tournaments of the 2009 WTA Tour. It was held in Kockelscheuer, Luxembourg, from 17 October through 25 October 2009. Unseeded Timea Bacsinszky won the singles title.

== Finals ==
=== Singles ===
(Switzerland) Timea Bacsinszky defeated (Germany) Sabine Lisicki, 6-2, 7-5

- It was Bacsinszky's 1st title of the year and her career.

=== Doubles ===
(Czech Republic) Iveta Benešová / (Czech Republic) Barbora Záhlavová-Strýcová defeated (Czech Republic) Vladimíra Uhlířová / (Czech Republic) Renata Voráčová, 1-6, 6-0, [10-7]

== WTA entrants ==
=== Seeds ===
Country	Player	Rank^{1}	Seed
DEN	Caroline Wozniacki	5	1
BEL	Kim Clijsters	18	2
ESP	Anabel Medina Garrigues	21	3
SVK	Daniela Hantuchová	23	4
BEL	Yanina Wickmayer	24	5
GER	Sabine Lisicki	28	6
UKR	Kateryna Bondarenko	29	7
ESP	Carla Suárez Navarro	34	8

- seeds are based on the rankings of October 12, 2009

=== Other entrants ===
The following players received wildcards into the singles main draw:

- (Belgium) Kim Clijsters
- (Slovenia) Polona Hercog
- (Luxembourg) Mandy Minella

The following players received entry from the qualifying draw:

- (Italy) Maria Elena Camerin
- (Colombia) Catalina Castaño
- (Belgium) Kirsten Flipkens
- (Czech Republic) Barbora Záhlavová-Strýcová

The following players received entry as a Lucky loser:

- (Luxembourg) Anne Kremer
- (France) Aravane Rezaï
