= 2012 BGL Luxembourg Open =

- Date: 15–21 October
- Edition: 17th
- Category: WTA International
- Draw: 32S / 16D
- Prize money: $220,000
- Surface: Hard / indoor
- Location: Kockelscheuer, Luxembourg

Champions

Singles
- (United States) Venus Williams

Doubles
- (Czech Republic) Andrea Hlaváčková / (Czech Republic) Lucie Hradecká
← 2011 ·	BGL Luxembourg Open	· 2013 →

The 2012 BGL Luxembourg Open was a professional women's tennis tournament played on hard courts. It was the 17th edition of the tournament, which was part of the 2012 WTA Tour. It took place in Kockelscheuer, Luxembourg between 15 and 21 October 2011. Unseeded Venus Williams won the singles title.

== Finals ==
=== Singles ===
- (United States) Venus Williams defeated (Romania) Monica Niculescu 6–2, 6–3

=== Doubles ===
- (Czech Republic) Andrea Hlaváčková / (Czech Republic) Lucie Hradecká defeated (Romania) Irina-Camelia Begu / (Romania) Monica Niculescu 6–3, 6–4

== Singles main-draw entrants ==
=== Seeds ===
Country	Player	Rank^{1}	Seed
ITA	Roberta Vinci	15	1
GER	Julia Görges	19	2
SRB	Jelena Janković	22	3
~~BEL~~	~~Yanina Wickmayer~~	~~23~~	~~4~~
GER	Sabine Lisicki	25	5
ROU	Sorana Cîrstea	26	6
AUT	Tamira Paszek	27	7
ESP	Carla Suárez Navarro	35	8
GER	Mona Barthel	37	9

- ^{1} Rankings are as of October 8, 2012

=== Other entrants ===
The following players received wildcards into the singles main draw:

- (Switzerland) Belinda Bencic
- (Belgium) Kirsten Flipkens
- (Luxembourg) Mandy Minella

The following players received entry from the qualifying draw:

- (Germany) Annika Beck
- (Russia) Vera Dushevina
- (Germany) Tatjana Malek
- (Spain) Garbiñe Muguruza

The following players received entry as lucky loser:

- (United Kingdom) Anne Keothavong

=== Withdrawals ===
- (Hungary) Tímea Babos
- (Germany) Angelique Kerber (foot injury)
- (United States) Sloane Stephens
- (Belgium) Yanina Wickmayer (knee injury)

=== Retirements ===
- (China) Peng Shuai (right shoulder injury)

== Doubles main-draw entrants ==
=== Seeds ===
Country	Player	Country	Player	Rank^{1}	Seed
CZE	Andrea Hlaváčková	CZE	Lucie Hradecká	11	1
ROU	Irina-Camelia Begu	ROU	Monica Niculescu	75	2
RUS	Vera Dushevina	BLR	Olga Govortsova	117	3
CRO	Petra Martić	LUX	Mandy Minella	127	4

- ^{1} Rankings are as of October 8, 2012

=== Other entrants ===
The following pairs received wildcards into the doubles main draw:

- (Germany) Mona Barthel / (Serbia) Jelena Janković
- (Switzerland) Belinda Bencic / (Luxembourg) Claudine Schaul

=== Retirements ===
- (Serbia) Jelena Janković (gastrointestinal illness)
