= 2019 Nürnberger Versicherungscup – Doubles =

Doubles
- 2019 Nürnberger Versicherungscup

Final
- Champions: (Canada) Gabriela Dabrowski (China) Xu Yifan
- Runners-up: (Canada) Sharon Fichman (United States) Nicole Melichar
- Score: 4–6, 7–6^{(7–5)}, [10–5]

Details
- Draw: 16 (2WC)
- Seeds: 4

Events
Singles	Doubles
- Nürnberger Versicherungscup

Demi Schuurs and Katarina Srebotnik were the defending champions, but chose not to participate together. Schuurs was scheduled to play alongside Anna-Lena Grönefeld, but the team withdrew before their first round match. Srebotnik teamed up with Raquel Atawo, but lost in the semifinals to Gabriela Dabrowski and Xu Yifan.

Dabrowski and Xu went on to win the title, defeating Sharon Fichman and Nicole Melichar in the final 4–6, 7–6^{(7–5)}, [10–5].

== Seeds ==
1. (Canada) Gabriela Dabrowski / (China) Xu Yifan (champions)
2. (Germany) Anna-Lena Grönefeld / (Netherlands) Demi Schuurs (withdrew)
3. (United States) Raquel Atawo / (Slovenia) Katarina Srebotnik (semifinals)
4. (Belgium) Kirsten Flipkens / (Sweden) Johanna Larsson (first round)

== Draw ==
Key

- Q = Qualifier
- WC = Wild card
- LL = Lucky loser
- Alt = Alternate
- ITF = ITF entry
- PR = Protected ranking
- SR = Special ranking
- SE = Special exempt
- JE = Junior exempt
- JR = Junior Accelerator Programme entrant
- CO = College Accelerator Programme entrant
- NG = Next Gen Accelerator Program entrant
- w/o = Walkover
- r = Retired
- d = Defaulted

=== Draw ===
First round
1	(Canada) G Dabrowski (China) Y Xu	6	6
(Sweden) C Lister (Czech Republic) R Voráčová	2	2
WC	(Germany) K Gerlach (Germany) J Wachaczyk	2	3
(Italy) G Marchetti (Brazil) L Pigossi	6	6
3	(United States) R Atawo (Slovenia) K Srebotnik	3	6	[11]
WC	(Germany) K Hobgarski (Germany) J Niemeier	6	3	[9]
(Japan) S Aoyama (Russia) Y Sizikova	7^{10}	7
(Poland) P Kania (Switzerland) X Knoll	6^{8}	5
(Russia) A Fomina (India) P Thombare	1	4
(Germany) M Barthel (Germany) A-L Friedsam	6	6
(Chile) A Guarachi (United States) S Santamaria	6	7
4	(Belgium) K Flipkens (Sweden) J Larsson	3	5
(Canada) S Fichman (United States) N Melichar	6	4	[10]
(Romania) A Mitu (Russia) A Panova	3	6	[6]
(Brazil) L Stefani (Serbia) N Stojanović	6	6
Alt	(Uzbekistan) A Amanmuradova (Russia) V Ivakhnenko	3	2

Quarterfinals
1	(Canada) G Dabrowski (China) Y Xu	6	6
(Italy) G Marchetti (Brazil) L Pigossi	3	4
3	(United States) R Atawo (Slovenia) K Srebotnik	6	0	[10]
(Japan) S Aoyama (Russia) Y Sizikova	3	6	[5]
(Germany) M Barthel (Germany) A-L Friedsam	6	2	[8]
(Chile) A Guarachi (United States) S Santamaria	1	6	[10]
(Canada) S Fichman (United States) N Melichar	6	6
(Brazil) L Stefani (Serbia) N Stojanović	3	3

Semifinals
1	(Canada) G Dabrowski (China) Y Xu	6	7
3	(United States) R Atawo (Slovenia) K Srebotnik	1	5
(Chile) A Guarachi (United States) S Santamaria	3	2
(Canada) S Fichman (United States) N Melichar	6	6

Final
1	(Canada) G Dabrowski (China) Y Xu	4	7^{7}	[10]
(Canada) S Fichman (United States) N Melichar	6	6^{5}	[5]
