= 2010 BGL Luxembourg Open – Doubles =

Doubles
- 2010 BGL Luxembourg Open

Final
- Champions: (Switzerland) Timea Bacsinszky (Italy) Tathiana Garbin
- Runners-up: (Czech Republic) Iveta Benešová (Czech Republic) Barbora Záhlavová-Strýcová
- Score: 6–4, 6–4

Events
Singles	Doubles
← 2009 ·	BGL Luxembourg Open	· 2011 →

Iveta Benešová and Barbora Záhlavová-Strýcová were the defending champions. They reached the final, where they lost to Timea Bacsinszky and Tathiana Garbin 4–6, 4–6.

== Seeds ==
1. (Czech Republic) Iveta Benešová / (Czech Republic) Barbora Záhlavová-Strýcová (final)
2. (Switzerland) Timea Bacsinszky / (Italy) Tathiana Garbin (champions)
3. (Germany) Julia Görges / (Germany) Anna-Lena Grönefeld (first round)
4. (Czech Republic) Lucie Hradecká / (Czech Republic) Renata Voráčová (semifinals)

== Draw ==
=== Key ===
- Q = Qualifier
- WC = Wild card
- LL = Lucky loser
- Alt = Alternate
- SE = Special exempt
- PR = Protected ranking
- ITF = ITF entry
- JE = Junior exempt
- w/o = Walkover
- r = Retired
- d = Defaulted
- SR = Special ranking

=== Draw ===
First round
1	(Czech Republic) I Benešová (Czech Republic) B Záhlavová-Strýcová	w/o
(Romania) S Cîrstea (Slovenia) A Klepač
(United States) R Kops-Jones (India) S Mirza	6	6
WC	(Luxembourg) A Kremer (Luxembourg) M Minella	3	2
4	(Czech Republic) L Hradecká (Czech Republic) R Voráčová	4	6	[10]
(Bosnia and Herzegovina) M Jugić-Salkić (Croatia) D Jurak	6	3	[8]
(South Africa) C Scheepers (France) A Védy	6	3	[5]
WC	(Serbia) A Ivanovic (Belgium) Y Wickmayer	4	6	[10]
(Sweden) S Arvidsson (United States) J Craybas	7	2	[11]
(United Kingdom) S Borwell (United Kingdom) A Keothavong	6^{5}	6	[13]
(Slovenia) P Hercog (Croatia) P Martić	6	6^{2}	[10]
3	(Germany) J Görges (Germany) A-L Grönefeld	4	7	[5]
(Greece) E Daniilidou (Germany) J Wöhr	6	6
(Latvia) L Dekmeijere (France) S Lefèvre	3	0
(Germany) K Barrois (Spain) A Parra Santonja	6	2	[7]
2	(Switzerland) T Bacsinszky (Italy) T Garbin	4	6	[10]

Quarterfinals
1	(Czech Republic) I Benešová (Czech Republic) B Záhlavová-Strýcová	6	0	[10]
(United States) R Kops-Jones (India) S Mirza	4	6	[7]
4	(Czech Republic) L Hradecká (Czech Republic) R Voráčová	6	6
WC	(Serbia) A Ivanovic (Belgium) Y Wickmayer	2	2
(United Kingdom) S Borwell (United Kingdom) A Keothavong	2	4
(Slovenia) P Hercog (Croatia) P Martić	6	6
(Greece) E Daniilidou (Germany) J Wöhr	6^{5}	3
2	(Switzerland) T Bacsinszky (Italy) T Garbin	7	6

Semifinals
1	(Czech Republic) I Benešová (Czech Republic) B Záhlavová-Strýcová	7	6
4	(Czech Republic) L Hradecká (Czech Republic) R Voráčová	6^{4}	1
(Slovenia) P Hercog (Croatia) P Martić	1	3
2	(Switzerland) T Bacsinszky (Italy) T Garbin	6	6

Final
1	(Czech Republic) I Benešová (Czech Republic) B Záhlavová-Strýcová	4	4
2	(Switzerland) T Bacsinszky (Italy) T Garbin	6	6
