= 2009 BGL Luxembourg Open – Doubles =

Doubles
- 2009 BGL Luxembourg Open

Final
- Champions: (Czech Republic) Iveta Benešová (Czech Republic) Barbora Záhlavová-Strýcová
- Runners-up: (Czech Republic) Vladimíra Uhlířová (Czech Republic) Renata Voráčová
- Score: 1-6, 6-0, [10-7]

Events
Singles	Doubles
← 2008 ·	BGL Luxembourg Open	· 2010 →

Sorana Cîrstea and Marina Erakovic were the defending champions, but they chose not to participate this year.
Iveta Benešová and Barbora Záhlavová-Strýcová won in the final 1–6, 6–0, [10-7] against Vladimíra Uhlířová and Renata Voráčová.

== Seeds ==
1. (Germany) Anna-Lena Grönefeld / (Switzerland) Patty Schnyder (quarterfinals)
2. (Czech Republic) Iveta Benešová / (Czech Republic) Barbora Záhlavová-Strýcová (champions)
3. (Poland) Klaudia Jans / (Poland) Alicja Rosolska (quarterfinals)
4. (Czech Republic) Andrea Hlaváčková / (Czech Republic) Lucie Hradecká (first round)

== Draw ==
=== Key ===
- Q = Qualifier
- WC = Wild card
- LL = Lucky loser
- Alt = Alternate
- SE = Special exempt
- PR = Protected ranking
- ITF = ITF entry
- JE = Junior exempt
- w/o = Walkover
- r = Retired
- d = Defaulted
- SR = Special ranking

=== Finals ===
First round
1	(Germany) A-L Grönefeld (Switzerland) P Schnyder	6	6
(France) J Coin (Canada) M-È Pelletier	1	1
(Latvia) L Dekmeijere (Slovenia) A Klepač	3	1
(Czech Republic) V Uhlířová (Czech Republic) R Voráčová	6	6
3	(Poland) K Jans (Poland) A Rosolska	7	6^{2}	[10]
(Ukraine) Y Fedak (Hungary) K Marosi	5	7	[4]
(United States) M Shaughnessy (Slovenia) K Srebotnik	6	6
(France) S Lefèvre (France) A Védy	2	1
ALT	(Switzerland) T Bacsinszky (Slovenia) P Hercog	3	4
(Spain) A Medina Garrigues (Spain) C Suárez Navarro	6	6
(Germany) T Malek (Spain) A Parra Santonja	3	6	[10]
4	(Czech Republic) A Hlaváčková (Czech Republic) L Hradecká	6	3	[6]
(United Kingdom) S Borwell (United States) R Kops-Jones	2	0
WC	(Belgium) K Clijsters (Belgium) K Flipkens	6	6
(Germany) J Görges (Poland) U Radwańska	7	3	[8]
2	(Czech Republic) I Benešová (Czech Republic) B Záhlavová-Strýcová	6	6	[10]

Quarterfinals
1	(Germany) A-L Grönefeld (Switzerland) P Schnyder	2	3
(Czech Republic) V Uhlířová (Czech Republic) R Voráčová	6	6
3	(Poland) K Jans (Poland) A Rosolska	3	3
(United States) M Shaughnessy (Slovenia) K Srebotnik	6	6
(Spain) A Medina Garrigues (Spain) C Suárez Navarro	6	6
(Germany) T Malek (Spain) A Parra Santonja	4	4
WC	(Belgium) K Clijsters (Belgium) K Flipkens	6	3	[5]
2	(Czech Republic) I Benešová (Czech Republic) B Záhlavová-Strýcová	3	6	[10]

Semifinals
(Czech Republic) V Uhlířová (Czech Republic) R Voráčová	4	6	[10]
(United States) M Shaughnessy (Slovenia) K Srebotnik	6	4	[5]
(Spain) A Medina Garrigues (Spain) C Suárez Navarro	2	3
2	(Czech Republic) I Benešová (Czech Republic) B Záhlavová-Strýcová	6	6

Finals
(Czech Republic) V Uhlířová (Czech Republic) R Voráčová	6	0	7
2	(Czech Republic) I Benešová (Czech Republic) B Záhlavová-Strýcová	1	6	[10]
