= 2011 BGL Luxembourg Open =

- Date: 17–23 October
- Edition: 16th
- Surface: Hard / indoor
- Location: Luxembourg City, Luxembourg

Champions

Singles
- (Belarus) Victoria Azarenka

Doubles
- (Czech Republic) Iveta Benešová / (Czech Republic) Barbora Záhlavová-Strýcová
← 2010 ·	BGL Luxembourg Open	· 2012 →

The 2011 BGL Luxembourg Open was a professional women's tennis tournament played on hard courts. It was the 16th edition of the tournament, which was part of the 2011 WTA Tour. It took place in Kockelscheuer, Luxembourg between 17 and 23 October 2011. Victoria Azarenka won the singles title.

== Finals ==
=== Singles ===
(Belarus) Victoria Azarenka defeated (Romania) Monica Niculescu 6–2, 6–2

- It was Azarenka's third title of the year, and the eighth of her career.

=== Doubles ===
(Czech Republic) Iveta Benešová / (Czech Republic) Barbora Záhlavová-Strýcová defeated (Czech Republic) Lucie Hradecká / (Russia) Ekaterina Makarova 7–5, 6–3

== Entrants ==
=== Seeds ===
Country	Player	Rank^{1}	Seed
BLR	Victoria Azarenka	3	1
RUS	Anastasia Pavlyuchenkova	15	2
GER	~~Sabine Lisicki~~	~~17~~	~~3~~
ITA	Flavia Pennetta	18	4
SRB	Ana Ivanovic	20	5
GER	Julia Görges	21	6
RUS	Maria Kirilenko	24	7
SVK	Daniela Hantuchová	25	8

- ^{1} Rankings are as of October 10, 2011.

=== Other entrants ===
The following players received wildcards into the singles main draw:

- (Germany) Angelique Kerber
- (Luxembourg) Anne Kremer
- (Luxembourg) Mandy Minella

The following players received entry from the qualifying draw:

- (Romania) Alexandra Cadanțu
- (United Kingdom) Anne Keothavong
- (Italy) Karin Knapp
- (Netherlands) Bibiane Schoofs

The following players received entry from a lucky loser spot:

- (Czech Republic) Lucie Hradecká
