= 2012 BGL Luxembourg Open – Doubles =

Doubles
- 2012 BGL Luxembourg Open

Final
- Champions: (Czech Republic) Andrea Hlaváčková (Czech Republic) Lucie Hradecká
- Runners-up: (Romania) Irina-Camelia Begu (Romania) Monica Niculescu
- Score: 6–3, 6–4

Events
| Singles | Doubles |
| ← 2011 · | BGL Luxembourg Open | · 2013 → |

Iveta Benešová and Barbora Záhlavová-Strýcová were the defending champions, but decided not to participate.
Andrea Hlaváčková and Lucie Hradecká won the final 6–3, 6–4 against Irina-Camelia Begu and Monica Niculescu.

== Seeds ==
1. (Czech Republic) Andrea Hlaváčková / (Czech Republic) Lucie Hradecká (champions)
2. (Romania) Irina-Camelia Begu / (Romania) Monica Niculescu (final)
3. (Russia) Vera Dushevina / (Belarus) Olga Govortsova (semifinals)
4. (Croatia) Petra Martić / (Luxembourg) Mandy Minella (quarterfinals)

== Draw ==
=== Key ===
- Q = Qualifier
- WC = Wild card
- LL = Lucky loser
- Alt = Alternate
- SE = Special exempt
- PR = Protected ranking
- ITF = ITF entry
- JE = Junior exempt
- w/o = Walkover
- r = Retired
- d = Defaulted
- SR = Special ranking

=== Draw ===
First round
1 | (Czech Republic) A Hlaváčková (Czech Republic) L Hradecká | 6 | 6
(Czech Republic) E Birnerová (Colombia) C Castaño | 4 | 2
(United States) M Brengle (United States) J Elie | 1 | 0
(Spain) L Arruabarrena Vecino (Spain) L Domínguez Lino | 6 | 6
4 | (Croatia) P Martić (Luxembourg) M Minella | 6 | 4 | [10]
(Bosnia and Herzegovina) M Jugić-Salkić (Russia) I Khromacheva | 4 | 6 | [4]
(United States) B Mattek-Sands (Germany) A Petkovic | 7^{7} | 7
WC | (Switzerland) B Bencic (Luxembourg) C Schaul | 6^{5} | 5
(Austria) S Klemenschits (Germany) T Malek | 2 | 1
WC | (Germany) M Barthel (Serbia) J Janković | 6 | 6
(Spain) S Soler Espinosa (Spain) C Suárez Navarro | 4 | 3
3 | (Russia) V Dushevina (Belarus) O Govortsova | 6 | 6
(Netherlands) K Bertens (Netherlands) A Rus | 3 | 6 | [10]
(United Kingdom) A Keothavong (Slovenia) A Klepač | 6 | 2 | [6]
(Switzerland) R Oprandi (Austria) T Paszek | 1 | 0
2 | (Romania) I-C Begu (Romania) M Niculescu | 6 | 6

Quarterfinals
1 | (Czech Republic) A Hlaváčková (Czech Republic) L Hradecká | 6^{2} | 7^{8} | [10]
(Spain) L Arruabarrena Vecino (Spain) L Domínguez Lino | 7^{7} | 6^{6} | [5]
4 | (Croatia) P Martić (Luxembourg) M Minella | 3 | 3
(United States) B Mattek-Sands (Germany) A Petkovic | 6 | 6
WC | (Germany) M Barthel (Serbia) J Janković
3 | (Russia) V Dushevina (Belarus) O Govortsova | w/o
(Netherlands) K Bertens (Netherlands) A Rus | 4 | 3
2 | (Romania) I-C Begu (Romania) M Niculescu | 6 | 6

Semifinals
1 | (Czech Republic) A Hlaváčková (Czech Republic) L Hradecká | 4 | 6 | [10]
(United States) B Mattek-Sands (Germany) A Petkovic | 6 | 4 | [8]
3 | (Russia) V Dushevina (Belarus) O Govortsova | 5 | 4
2 | (Romania) I-C Begu (Romania) M Niculescu | 7 | 6

Final
1 | (Czech Republic) A Hlaváčková (Czech Republic) L Hradecká | 6 | 6
2 | (Romania) I-C Begu (Romania) M Niculescu | 3 | 4
