= 2011 BGL Luxembourg Open – Doubles =

Doubles
- 2011 BGL Luxembourg Open

Final
- Champions: (Czech Republic) Iveta Benešová (Czech Republic) Barbora Záhlavová-Strýcová
- Runners-up: (Czech Republic) Lucie Hradecká (Russia) Ekaterina Makarova
- Score: 7–5, 6–3

Events
Singles	Doubles
← 2010 ·	BGL Luxembourg Open	· 2012 →

Timea Bacsinszky and Tathiana Garbin were the defending champions but chose not to participate this year.

Iveta Benešová and Barbora Záhlavová-Strýcová won the title beating Lucie Hradecká and Ekaterina Makarova in the final, 7–5, 6–3.

== Seeds ==
1. (Czech Republic) Iveta Benešová / (Czech Republic) Barbora Záhlavová-Strýcová (champions)
2. (Czech Republic) Lucie Hradecká / (Russia) Ekaterina Makarova (final)
3. (Poland) Klaudia Jans-Ignacik / (Germany) Jasmin Wöhr (quarterfinals)
4. (Spain) Anabel Medina Garrigues / (Russia) Anastasia Pavlyuchenkova (semifinals)

== Draw ==
=== Key ===
- Q = Qualifier
- WC = Wild card
- LL = Lucky loser
- Alt = Alternate
- SE = Special exempt
- PR = Protected ranking
- ITF = ITF entry
- JE = Junior exempt
- w/o = Walkover
- r = Retired
- d = Defaulted
- SR = Special ranking

=== Draw ===
First round
1	(Czech Republic) I Benešová (Czech Republic) B Záhlavová-Strýcová	6	6
(Germany) M Barthel (Germany) L Siegemund	3	4
(Greece) E Daniilidou (Germany) A-L Grönefeld	7	3	[7]
(Slovenia) A Klepač (Georgia (country)) A Tatishvili	5	6	[10]
3	(Poland) K Jans-Ignacik (Germany) J Wöhr	7	6
(United Kingdom) A Keothavong (United Kingdom) H Watson	5	4
(Germany) A Kerber (Luxembourg) M Minella	1	0
(Romania) S Halep (Slovakia) J Husárová	6	6
(New Zealand) M Erakovic (Romania) M Niculescu	6	6
(Spain) S Soler-Espinosa (Spain) C Suárez Navarro	3	3
(Netherlands) K Bertens (Netherlands) B Schoofs
4	(Spain) A Medina Garrigues (Russia) A Pavlyuchenkova	w/o
(France) P Parmentier (Tunisia) S Sfar	6	5	[10]
(Luxembourg) A Kremer (France) V Razzano	2	7	[4]
(Austria) S Klemenschits (Germany) T Malek	1	5
2	(Czech Republic) L Hradecká (Russia) E Makarova	6	7

Quarterfinals
1	(Czech Republic) I Benešová (Czech Republic) B Záhlavová-Strýcová	3	6	[10]
(Slovenia) A Klepač (Georgia (country)) A Tatishvili	6	3	[4]
3	(Poland) K Jans-Ignacik (Germany) J Wöhr	4	4
(Romania) S Halep (Slovakia) J Husárová	6	6
(New Zealand) M Erakovic (Romania) M Niculescu	7^{7}	4	[5]
4	(Spain) A Medina Garrigues (Russia) A Pavlyuchenkova	6^{3}	6	[10]
(France) P Parmentier (Tunisia) S Sfar	5	3
2	(Czech Republic) L Hradecká (Russia) E Makarova	7	6

Semifinals
1	(Czech Republic) I Benešová (Czech Republic) B Záhlavová-Strýcová	6	7
(Romania) S Halep (Slovakia) J Husárová	2	5
4	(Spain) A Medina Garrigues (Russia) A Pavlyuchenkova	2	6	[11]
2	(Czech Republic) L Hradecká (Russia) E Makarova	6	3	[13]

Final
1	(Czech Republic) I Benešová (Czech Republic) B Záhlavová-Strýcová	7	6
2	(Czech Republic) L Hradecká (Russia) E Makarova	5	3
