= 2012 Open GDF Suez Nantes Atlantique – Doubles =

Doubles
- 2012 Open GDF Suez Nantes Atlantique

Final
- Champions: (Colombia) Catalina Castaño (Bosnia and Herzegovina) Mervana Jugić-Salkić
- Runners-up: (Czech Republic) Petra Cetkovská (Czech Republic) Renata Voráčová
- Score: 6–4, 6–4

Events
Singles	Doubles
- Open GDF Suez Nantes Atlantique

Stéphanie Foretz Gacon and Kristina Mladenovic were the defending champions, but Mladenovic chose not to participate. Foretz Gacon partnered up with Julie Coin, but they lost in the first round to Magda Linette and Katarzyna Piter.

Catalina Castaño and Mervana Jugić-Salkić won the title, defeating Petra Cetkovská and Renata Voráčová in the final, 6–4, 6–4.

== Seeds ==
1. (Colombia) Catalina Castaño / (Bosnia and Herzegovina) Mervana Jugić-Salkić (champions)
2. (Czech Republic) Karolína Plíšková / (Czech Republic) Kristýna Plíšková (semifinals, withdrew)
3. (France) Julie Coin / (France) Stéphanie Foretz Gacon (first round)
4. (Czech Republic) Petra Cetkovská / (Czech Republic) Renata Voráčová (final)

== Draw ==
Key

- Q = Qualifier
- WC = Wild card
- LL = Lucky loser
- Alt = Alternate
- ITF = ITF entry
- PR = Protected ranking
- SR = Special ranking
- SE = Special exempt
- JE = Junior exempt
- JR = Junior Accelerator Programme entrant
- CO = College Accelerator Programme entrant
- NG = Next Gen Accelerator Program entrant
- w/o = Walkover
- r = Retired
- d = Defaulted

First round
(Russia) N Ryzhonkova (Ukraine) M Zanevska	7	6
(Russia) N Orlova (Serbia) N Zorić	5	1
3	(France) J Coin (France) S Foretz Gacon	3	7^{7}	[9]
(Poland) M Linette (Poland) K Piter	6	6^{0}	[11]
(France) I Pavlovic (United States) A Riske	7	6
(Argentina) P Ormaechea (Ukraine) E Svitolina	5	4
(Romania) C Mitu (Netherlands) A van der Meet
(Belgium) M Boev (Tunisia) O Jabeur	w/o
(Germany) T Malek (Slovenia) P Rampre	6^{2}	2
4	(Czech Republic) P Cetkovská (Czech Republic) R Voráčová	7^{7}	6
(France) C Feuerstein (Switzerland) L Michel	6	1	[10]
(Romania) A Cadanțu (Belarus) E Dzehalevich	4	6	[8]

Quarterfinals
1	(Colombia) C Castaño (Bosnia and Herzegovina) M Jugić-Salkić	1
(Russia) N Ryzhonkova (Ukraine) M Zanevska	0^{r}
(Poland) M Linette (Poland) K Piter	3	4
(France) I Pavlovic (United States) A Riske	6	6
(Belgium) M Boev (Tunisia) O Jabeur	5	2
4	(Czech Republic) P Cetkovská (Czech Republic) R Voráčová	7	6
(France) C Feuerstein (Switzerland) L Michel	0	5
2	(Czech Republic) Ka Plíšková (Czech Republic) Kr Plíšková	6	7

Semifinals
1	(Colombia) C Castaño (Bosnia and Herzegovina) M Jugić-Salkić	6	6
(France) I Pavlovic (United States) A Riske	1	4
4	(Czech Republic) P Cetkovská (Czech Republic) R Voráčová	w/o
2	(Czech Republic) Ka Plíšková (Czech Republic) Kr Plíšková

Finals
1	(Colombia) C Castaño (Bosnia and Herzegovina) M Jugić-Salkić	6	6
4	(Czech Republic) P Cetkovská (Czech Republic) R Voráčová	4	4
