= 2010 BGL Luxembourg Open – Singles =

Singles
- 2010 BGL Luxembourg Open

Final
- Champion: (Italy) Roberta Vinci
- Runner-up: (Germany) Julia Görges
- Score: 6–3, 6–4

Details
- Seeds: 8

Events
Singles	Doubles
- BGL Luxembourg Open

Timea Bacsinszky was the defending champion, but she lost in the first round against Barbora Záhlavová-Strýcová.

Italian player Roberta Vinci defeated eighth seed Julia Görges 6–3, 6–4 in the final.

== Seeds ==
1. (Russia) Elena Dementieva (second round, withdrew due to an inflammation on her right foot)
2. (France) Aravane Rezaï (second round)
3. (Belgium) Yanina Wickmayer (first round)
4. (Serbia) Ana Ivanovic (quarterfinals)
5. (Slovakia) Daniela Hantuchová (second round)
6. (Switzerland) Timea Bacsinszky (first round)
7. (Australia) Jarmila Groth (second round)
8. (Germany) Julia Görges (final)

== Draw ==
Key

- Q = Qualifier
- WC = Wild card
- LL = Lucky loser
- Alt = Alternate
- ITF = ITF entry
- PR = Protected ranking
- SR = Special ranking
- SE = Special exempt
- JE = Junior exempt
- JR = Junior Accelerator Programme entrant
- CO = College Accelerator Programme entrant
- NG = Next Gen Accelerator Program entrant
- w/o = Walkover
- r = Retired
- d = Defaulted

=== Finals ===
Semifinals
(Germany) Angelique Kerber	4	6	1
8	(Germany) Julia Görges	6	3	6
PR	(United Kingdom) Anne Keothavong	4	2
(Italy) Roberta Vinci	6	6

Final
8	(Germany) Julia Görges	3	4
(Italy) Roberta Vinci	6	6

=== Top half ===
First round
1/WC	(Russia) E Dementieva	7	7
(China) S Peng	5	6^{3}
Q	(Croatia) I Lisjak	2	1	r
(Slovenia) P Hercog	6	1
(Germany) A Kerber	6	6
WC	(Russia) Y Putintseva	3	1
LL	(United States) J Craybas	5	1
5	(Slovakia) D Hantuchová	7	6
4	(Serbia) A Ivanovic	6	6
(Sweden) J Larsson	3	0
(Italy) R Oprandi	5	3
(Spain) A Parra Santonja	7	6
(Germany) K Barrois	4	6	5
(Spain) C Suárez Navarro	6	2	7
WC	(Luxembourg) M Minella	4	3
8	(Germany) J Görges	6	6

Second round
1/WC	(Russia) E Dementieva
(Slovenia) P Hercog	w/o
(Germany) A Kerber	3	6	6
5	(Slovakia) D Hantuchová	6	3	1
4	(Serbia) A Ivanovic	6	6
(Spain) A Parra Santonja	4	1
(Spain) C Suárez Navarro	2	1
8	(Germany) J Görges	6	6

Quarterfinals
(Slovenia) P Hercog	4	2
(Germany) A Kerber	6	6
4	(Serbia) A Ivanovic	3	1
8	(Germany) J Görges	6	6

Semifinals
(Germany) A Kerber	4	6	1
8	(Germany) J Görges	6	3	6

=== Bottom half ===
First round
7	(Australia) J Groth	6	6
(Italy) T Garbin	2	2
Q	(Germany) K Wörle	1	2
(Czech Republic) I Benešová	6	6
WC	(France) V Razzano	1	4
PR	(United Kingdom) A Keothavong	6	6
(Switzerland) P Schnyder	6	6
3	(Belgium) Y Wickmayer	4	4
6	(Switzerland) T Bacsinszky	5	1
(Czech Republic) B Záhlavová-Strýcová	7	6
(Italy) R Vinci	6	7
(Sweden) S Arvidsson	4	6^{7}
(Belgium) K Flipkens	6	6
Q	(Czech Republic) L Hradecká	2	3
Q	(Germany) M Barthel	4	4
2	(France) A Rezaï	6	6

Second round
7	(Australia) J Groth	4	5
(Czech Republic) I Benešová	6	7
PR	(United Kingdom) A Keothavong	7	6
(Switzerland) P Schnyder	5	2
(Czech Republic) B Záhlavová-Strýcová	6^{4}	6	6^{2}
(Italy) R Vinci	7	4	7
(Belgium) K Flipkens	6	6
2	(France) A Rezaï	0	1

Quarterfinals
(Czech Republic) I Benešová	7	2	4
PR	(United Kingdom) A Keothavong	6^{3}	6	6
(Italy) R Vinci	7	6
(Belgium) K Flipkens	6^{5}	1

Semifinals
PR	(United Kingdom) A Keothavong	4	2
(Italy) R Vinci	6	6
