= 2012 Open GDF Suez Nantes Atlantique – Singles =

Singles
- 2012 Open GDF Suez Nantes Atlantique

Final
- Champion: (Romania) Monica Niculescu
- Runner-up: (Kazakhstan) Yulia Putintseva
- Score: 6–2, 6–3

Events
Singles	Doubles
- Open GDF Suez Nantes Atlantique

Alison Riske was the defending champion but lost to Yulia Putintseva in the second round.

Monica Niculescu won the title, defeating Putintseva in the final, 6–2, 6–3.

== Seeds ==
1. (Czech Republic) Petra Cetkovská (second round)
2. (Romania) Monica Niculescu (champion)
3. (Romania) Alexandra Cadanțu (first round)
4. (France) Stéphanie Foretz Gacon (first round)
5. (Spain) Garbiñe Muguruza (first round)
6. (Czech Republic) Kristýna Plíšková (first round)
7. (Czech Republic) Karolína Plíšková (quarterfinals)
8. (Austria) Yvonne Meusburger (first round)

== Main draw ==
Key

- Q = Qualifier
- WC = Wild card
- LL = Lucky loser
- Alt = Alternate
- ITF = ITF entry
- PR = Protected ranking
- SR = Special ranking
- SE = Special exempt
- JE = Junior exempt
- JR = Junior Accelerator Programme entrant
- CO = College Accelerator Programme entrant
- NG = Next Gen Accelerator Program entrant
- w/o = Walkover
- r = Retired
- d = Defaulted

=== Finals ===
Semifinals
(France) Claire Feuerstein	3	6	6^{2}
(Kazakhstan) Yulia Putintseva	6	3	7^{7}
(France) Virginie Razzano	6	3	2
2	(Romania) Monica Niculescu	3	6	6

Final
(Kazakhstan) Yulia Putintseva	2	3
2	(Romania) Monica Niculescu	6	6

=== Top half ===
First round
1	(Czech Republic) P Cetkovská	6	6
WC	(France) I Brémond	3	4
LL	(France) M Georges	4	4
(Germany) T Malek	6	6
JE	(Belgium) A-S Mestach	6	4	6
(France) I Pavlovic	3	6	1
(France) C Feuerstein	6	6
8	(Austria) Y Meusburger	4	2
3	(Romania) A Cadanțu	7^{7}	3	2
(Kazakhstan) Y Putintseva	6^{4}	6	6
(United States) A Riske	6	6
(France) A Rezaï	3	4
(Russia) V Savinykh	6	6
PR	(Czech Republic) R Voráčová	1	3
(Argentina) P Ormaechea	6	0	6
5	(Spain) G Muguruza	3	6	2

Second round
1	(Czech Republic) P Cetkovská	1	7^{7}	1
(Germany) T Malek	6	6^{5}	6
JE	(Belgium) A-S Mestach	6	6^{7}	6^{4}
(France) C Feuerstein	3	7^{9}	7^{7}
(Kazakhstan) Y Putintseva	7^{8}	7^{7}
(United States) A Riske	6^{6}	6^{5}
(Russia) V Savinykh	3	3
(Argentina) P Ormaechea	6	6

Quarterfinals
(Germany) T Malek	6^{4}	4
(France) C Feuerstein	7^{7}	6
(Kazakhstan) Y Putintseva	7	6
(Argentina) P Ormaechea	5	3

Semifinals
(France) C Feuerstein	3	6	6^{2}
(Kazakhstan) Y Putintseva	6	3	7

=== Bottom half ===
First round
6	(Czech Republic) Kr Plíšková	6	6^{4}	5
(Ukraine) K Kozlova	2	7^{7}	7
(France) V Razzano	6	6
Q	(Tunisia) O Jabeur	3	3
(Ukraine) E Svitolina	4	6	6
WC	(France) S Beltrame	6	3	4
Q	(Ukraine) O Savchuk	6	6
4	(France) S Foretz Gacon	1	4
7	(Czech Republic) Ka Plíšková	6	3	7
(China) S Zhang	4	6	5
Q	(Poland) M Linette	6	6^{3}	6
(Puerto Rico) M Puig	4	7^{7}	4
(Italy) N Burnett	4	7	2
Q	(Bosnia and Herzegovina) M Jugić-Salkić	6	5	6
WC	(France) J Coin	3	1
2	(Romania) M Niculescu	6	6

Second round
(Ukraine) K Kozlova	3	4
(France) V Razzano	6	6
(Ukraine) E Svitolina	4	6	5
Q	(Ukraine) O Savchuk	6	2	7
7	(Czech Republic) Ka Plíšková	6	6
Q	(Poland) M Linette	1	2
Q	(Bosnia and Herzegovina) M Jugić-Salkić	1	0
2	(Romania) M Niculescu	6	6

Quarterfinals
(France) V Razzano	6	6
Q	(Ukraine) O Savchuk	2	3
7	(Czech Republic) Ka Plíšková	3	1
2	(Romania) M Niculescu	6	6

Semifinals
(France) V Razzano	6	3	2
2	(Romania) M Niculescu	3	6	6
