= 2019 Nürnberger Versicherungscup – Singles =

Singles
- 2019 Nürnberger Versicherungscup

Final
- Champion: (Kazakhstan) Yulia Putintseva
- Runner-up: (Slovenia) Tamara Zidanšek
- Score: 4–6, 6–4, 6–2

Details
- Draw: 32
- Seeds: 8

Events
Singles	Doubles
- Nürnberger Versicherungscup

Johanna Larsson was the defending champion, but lost in the second round to Kateřina Siniaková.

Yulia Putintseva won her first WTA Tour title, defeating Tamara Zidanšek in the final, 4–6, 6–4, 6–2.

== Seeds ==
1. (Kazakhstan) Yulia Putintseva (champion)
2. (Czech Republic) Kateřina Siniaková (semifinals)
3. (Australia) Ajla Tomljanović (second round)
4. (United States) Alison Riske (first round)
5. (Russia) Ekaterina Alexandrova (second round)
6. (Belgium) Kirsten Flipkens (first round)
7. (Russia) Evgeniya Rodina (first round)
8. (Germany) Andrea Petkovic (second round)

== Draw ==
Key

- Q = Qualifier
- WC = Wild card
- LL = Lucky loser
- Alt = Alternate
- ITF = ITF entry
- PR = Protected ranking
- SR = Special ranking
- SE = Special exempt
- JE = Junior exempt
- JR = Junior Accelerator Programme entrant
- CO = College Accelerator Programme entrant
- NG = Next Gen Accelerator Program entrant
- w/o = Walkover
- r = Retired
- d = Defaulted

=== Finals ===
Semifinals
1	(Kazakhstan) Yulia Putintseva	6	7
(Romania) Sorana Cîrstea	4	5
(Slovenia) Tamara Zidanšek	7^{7}	6
2	(Czech Republic) Kateřina Siniaková	6^{4}	2

Final
1	(Kazakhstan) Yulia Putintseva	4	6	6
(Slovenia) Tamara Zidanšek	6	4	2

=== Top half ===
First round
1	(Kazakhstan) Y Putintseva	6	3
(Slovenia) D Jakupović	2	0^{r}
(Germany) M Barthel	6	3	6
(Argentina) P Ormaechea	3	6	2
WC	(Germany) A-L Friedsam	4	6	6
(Romania) I-C Begu	6	3	3
Q	(Turkey) Ç Büyükakçay	3	2
8	(Germany) A Petkovic	6	6
4	(United States) A Riske	6^{6}	6	2
Q	(Serbia) N Stojanović	7^{8}	2	6
(Spain) S Sorribes Tormo	7^{11}	3
(Belarus) V Lapko	6^{9}	1^{r}
Q	(Netherlands) Q Lemoine	1	3
Q	(Romania) LI Paar	6	6
(Romania) S Cîrstea	7^{8}	6
6	(Belgium) K Flipkens	6^{6}	2

Second round
1	(Kazakhstan) Y Putintseva	7^{10}	6
(Germany) M Barthel	6^{8}	1
WC	(Germany) A-L Friedsam	6	6
8	(Germany) A Petkovic	3	1
Q	(Serbia) N Stojanović	6	0	6
(Spain) S Sorribes Tormo	1	6	3
Q	(Romania) LI Paar	4	7^{8}	0
(Romania) S Cîrstea	6	6^{6}	6

Quarterfinals
1	(Kazakhstan) Y Putintseva	7	6^{5}	7^{7}
WC	(Germany) A-L Friedsam	5	7^{7}	6^{2}
Q	(Serbia) N Stojanović	6	4	2
(Romania) S Cîrstea	4	6	6

Semifinals
1	(Kazakhstan) Y Putintseva	6	7
(Romania) S Cîrstea	4	5

=== Bottom half ===
First round
5	(Russia) E Alexandrova	6	6
Q	(Slovakia) J Čepelová	4	2
(Russia) V Diatchenko	4	7^{7}	2
(Russia) V Kudermetova	6	6^{4}	6
(Slovenia) T Zidanšek	7^{7}	3	6
(Japan) M Doi	6^{4}	6	4
WC	(Germany) S Lisicki	2	5
3	(Australia) A Tomljanović	6	7
7	(Russia) E Rodina	6^{3}	3
(United States) M Brengle	7^{7}	6
(Czech Republic) Kr Plíšková	6	6
Q	(Germany) J Niemeier	1	3
WC	(Russia) S Kuznetsova	5	4
(Sweden) J Larsson	7	6
(Luxembourg) M Minella	6	3	2
2	(Czech Republic) K Siniaková	1	6	6

Second round
5	(Russia) E Alexandrova	0	4
(Russia) V Kudermetova	6	6
(Slovenia) T Zidanšek	6	6
3	(Australia) A Tomljanović	3	4
(United States) M Brengle	7^{8}	6
(Czech Republic) Kr Plíšková	6^{6}	0
(Sweden) J Larsson	6	0	3
2	(Czech Republic) K Siniaková	4	6	6

Quarterfinals
(Russia) V Kudermetova	4	6	3
(Slovenia) T Zidanšek	6	2	6
(United States) M Brengle	6	4	0
2	(Czech Republic) K Siniaková	1	6	6

Semifinals
(Slovenia) T Zidanšek	7^{7}	6
2	(Czech Republic) K Siniaková	6^{4}	2

== Qualifying ==
=== Seeds ===
1. (Slovakia) Jana Čepelová (qualified)
2. (Serbia) Dejana Radanović (qualifying competition)
3. (Netherlands) Quirine Lemoine (qualified)
4. (Australia) Destanee Aiava (qualifying competition)
5. (Cyprus) Raluca Șerban (qualifying competition)
6. (Turkey) Çağla Büyükakçay (qualified)
7. (Russia) Valentina Ivakhnenko (qualifying competition)
8. (Serbia) Nina Stojanović (qualified)
9. (Turkey) Pemra Özgen (first round)
10. (United States) Ashley Kratzer (first round)
11. (Bulgaria) Elitsa Kostova (first round)
12. (Argentina) Nadia Podoroska (first round)

=== Qualifiers ===
1. (Slovakia) Jana Čepelová
2. (Serbia) Nina Stojanović
3. (Netherlands) Quirine Lemoine
4. (Germany) Jule Niemeier
5. (Romania) Laura Ioana Paar
6. (Turkey) Çağla Büyükakçay

=== Draw ===
==== First qualifier ====
First round
1	(Slovakia) Jana Čepelová	6	6
(Russia) Olga Doroshina	4	3
(Germany) Katharina Gerlach	6	6
9	(Turkey) Pemra Özgen	3	0

Qualifying competition
1	(Slovakia) Jana Čepelová	3	6	6
(Germany) Katharina Gerlach	6	4	4

==== Second qualifier ====
First round
2	(Serbia) Dejana Radanović	6	6
(Italy) Anastasia Grymalska	3	4
(Russia) Marina Melnikova	4	2
8	(Serbia) Nina Stojanović	6	6

Qualifying competition
2	(Serbia) Dejana Radanović	6^{4}	7	1
8	(Serbia) Nina Stojanović	7^{7}	5	6

==== Third qualifier ====
First round
3	(Netherlands) Quirine Lemoine	6	4	6
Alt	(Russia) Anastasiya Komardina	1	6	3
WC	(Germany) Stephanie Wagner	6	5	0
7	(Russia) Valentina Ivakhnenko	3	7	6

Qualifying competition
3	(Netherlands) Quirine Lemoine	6	6
7	(Russia) Valentina Ivakhnenko	1	2

==== Fourth qualifier ====
First round
4	(Australia) Destanee Aiava	6	2	6
WC	(Austria) Mira Antonitsch	4	6	4
WC	(Germany) Jule Niemeier	6	6
10	(United States) Ashley Kratzer	1	4

Qualifying competition
4	(Australia) Destanee Aiava	2	5
WC	(Germany) Jule Niemeier	6	7

==== Fifth qualifier ====
First round
5	(Cyprus) Raluca Șerban	6	6
(Italy) Sara Errani	4	3
(Romania) Laura Ioana Paar	6	6
12	(Argentina) Nadia Podoroska	4	2

Qualifying competition
5	(Cyprus) Raluca Șerban	6	5	2
(Romania) Laura Ioana Paar	3	7	6

==== Sixth qualifier ====
First round
6	(Turkey) Çağla Büyükakçay	6	7
WC	(United States) Emma Navarro	4	5
(Germany) Katharina Hobgarski	2	6	6
11	(Bulgaria) Elitsa Kostova	6	2	2

Qualifying competition
6	(Turkey) Çağla Büyükakçay	6	6
(Germany) Katharina Hobgarski	3	3
