= 2009 BGL Luxembourg Open – Singles =

Singles
- 2009 BGL Luxembourg Open

Final
- Champion: (Switzerland) Timea Bacsinszky
- Runner-up: (Germany) Sabine Lisicki
- Score: 6–2, 7–5

Details
- Seeds: 8

Events
Singles	Doubles
- BGL Luxembourg Open

Elena Dementieva was the defending champion, but she chose not to participate that year.
Timea Bacsinszky won in the final 6–2, 7–5 against Sabine Lisicki. It was her first WTA Tour title.

== Seeds ==
1. (Denmark) Caroline Wozniacki (first round; retired due to a left hamstring strain)
2. (Belgium) Kim Clijsters (second round)
3. (Spain) Anabel Medina Garrigues (second round)
4. (Slovakia) Daniela Hantuchová (quarterfinals)
5. (Belgium) Yanina Wickmayer (semifinals)
6. (Germany) Sabine Lisicki (final)
7. (Ukraine) Kateryna Bondarenko (first round)
8. (Spain) Carla Suárez Navarro (second round)

== Draw ==
Key

- Q = Qualifier
- WC = Wild card
- LL = Lucky loser
- Alt = Alternate
- ITF = ITF entry
- PR = Protected ranking
- SR = Special ranking
- SE = Special exempt
- JE = Junior exempt
- JR = Junior Accelerator Programme entrant
- CO = College Accelerator Programme entrant
- NG = Next Gen Accelerator Program entrant
- w/o = Walkover
- r = Retired
- d = Defaulted

=== Finals ===
Semifinals
(Switzerland) Timea Bacsinszky	3	6	7
5	(Belgium) Yanina Wickmayer	6	2	5
(Israel) Shahar Pe'er	3	6	6^{5}
6	(Germany) Sabine Lisicki	6	4	7

Final
(Switzerland) Timea Bacsinszky	6	7
6	(Germany) Sabine Lisicki	2	5

=== Top half ===
First round
1	(Denmark) C Wozniacki	7	5	r
LL	(Luxembourg) A Kremer	5	0
(Slovenia) K Srebotnik	7	6
(Germany) A-L Grönefeld	5	3
(Switzerland) T Bacsinszky	6	6
(France) J Coin	4	3
(Italy) R Vinci	6	6
7	(Ukraine) K Bondarenko	0	2
3	(Spain) A Medina Garrigues	7	6
(Spain) A Parra Santonja	5	2
Q	(Belgium) K Flipkens	6	6
(Poland) U Radwańska	4	3
LL	(France) A Rezaï	0	2
(France) A Cornet	6	6
(Romania) A Dulgheru	3	6^{4}
5	(Belgium) Y Wickmayer	6	7

Second round
LL	(Luxembourg) A Kremer	6	4	0
(Slovenia) K Srebotnik	2	6	6
(Switzerland) T Bacsinszky	6	6
(Italy) R Vinci	2	2
3	(Spain) A Medina Garrigues	5	3
Q	(Belgium) K Flipkens	7	6
(France) A Cornet	5	6^{6}
5	(Belgium) Y Wickmayer	7	7

Quarterfinals
(Slovenia) K Srebotnik	7	1	4
(Switzerland) T Bacsinszky	6^{3}	6	6
Q	(Belgium) K Flipkens	6^{1}	6	1
5	(Belgium) Y Wickmayer	7	4	6

Semifinals
(Switzerland) T Bacsinszky	3	6	7
5	(Belgium) Y Wickmayer	6	2	5

=== Bottom half ===
First round
8	(Spain) C Suárez Navarro	7	5	6
WC	(Luxembourg) M Minella	5	7	3
Q	(Czech Republic) B Záhlavová-Strýcová	1	3
(Israel) S Pe'er	6	6
(Czech Republic) L Hradecká	7	6
Q	(Colombia) C Castaño	6^{4}	2
(Germany) T Malek	1	0
4	(Slovakia) D Hantuchová	6	6
6	(Germany) S Lisicki	6	6
(Czech Republic) I Benešová	1	4
WC	(Slovenia) P Hercog	3	7	7
Q	(Italy) ME Camerin	6	5	5
(Switzerland) P Schnyder	6	6
(Czech Republic) P Kvitová	4	1
(United States) M Shaughnessy	2	2
2/WC	(Belgium) K Clijsters	6	6

Second round
8	(Spain) C Suárez Navarro	6	3	1
(Israel) S Pe'er	3	6	6
(Czech Republic) L Hradecká	5	6	2
4	(Slovakia) D Hantuchová	7	3	6
6	(Germany) S Lisicki	7	6
WC	(Slovenia) P Hercog	6^{1}	4
(Switzerland) P Schnyder	6	3	7
2/WC	(Belgium) K Clijsters	4	6	6^{6}

Quarterfinals
(Israel) S Pe'er	6	7
4	(Slovakia) D Hantuchová	2	6^{4}
6	(Germany) S Lisicki	6	6
(Switzerland) P Schnyder	4	2

Semifinals
(Israel) S Pe'er	3	6	6^{5}
6	(Germany) S Lisicki	6	4	7
