= Yulia Putintseva =

Russian-born Kazakhstani tennis player (born 1995)

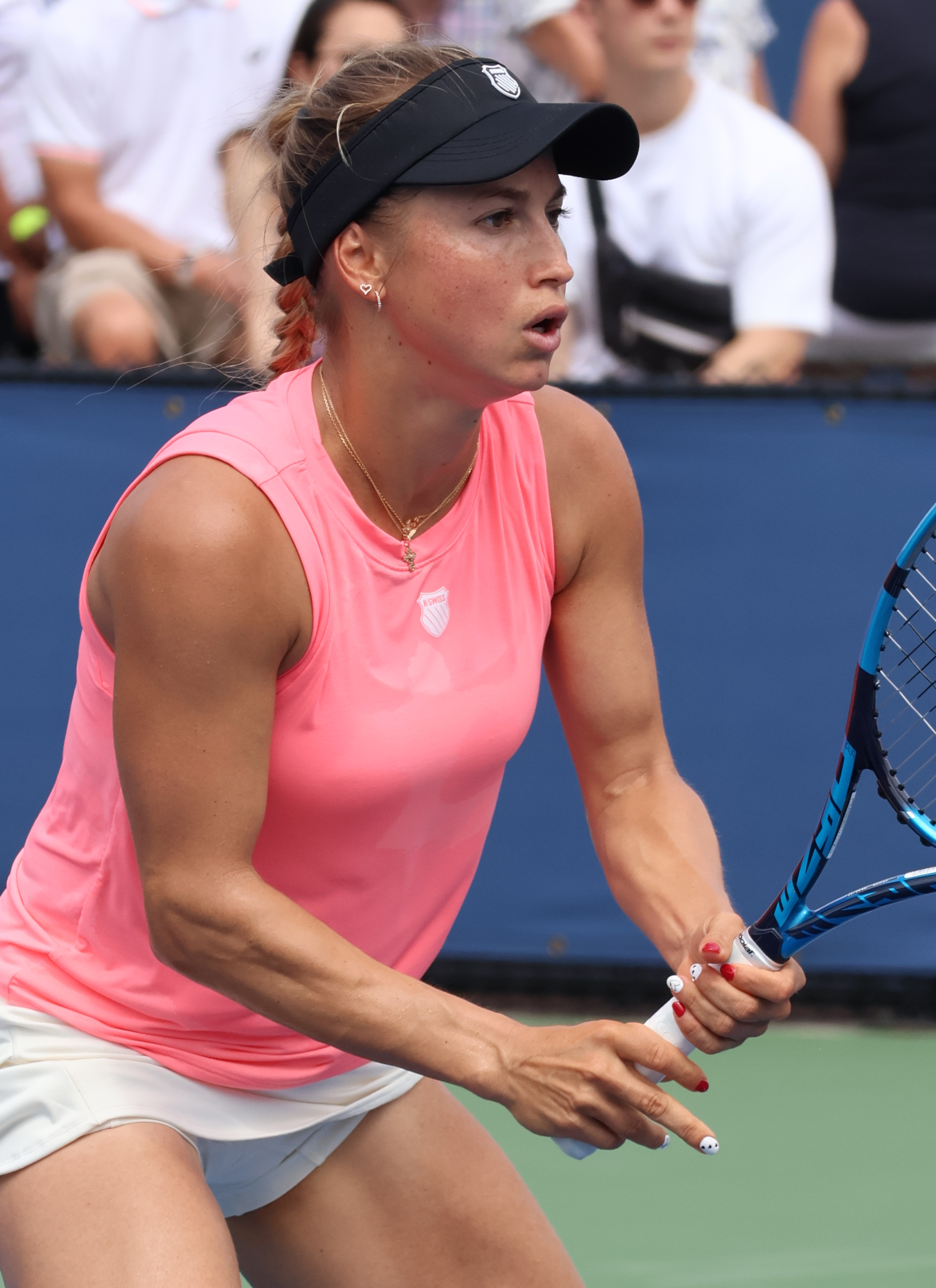
- Putintseva at the 2023 US Open
- Full name: Yulia Antonovna Putintseva
- Native name: Юлия Путинцева
- Country (sports): Russia (2009–June 2012); Kazakhstan (June 2012–present)
- Residence: Moscow, Russia; Boca Raton, Florida, US
- Born: 7 January 1995 (age 31) Moscow, Russia
- Height: 1.63 m (5 ft 4 in)
- Turned pro: 2009
- Plays: Right-handed (two-handed backhand)
- Coach: Matteo Donati
- Prize money: $10,613,860

Singles
- Career record: 478–374
- Career titles: 3
- Highest ranking: No. 20 (27 January 2025)
- Current ranking: No. 79 (12 October 2026)

Grand Slam singles results
- Australian Open: 4R (2026)
- French Open: QF (2016, 2018)
- Wimbledon: 4R (2024)
- US Open: QF (2020)

Doubles
- Career record: 26–74
- Career titles: 0
- Highest ranking: No. 57 (16 June 2025)
- Current ranking: No. 343 (12 October 2026)

Grand Slam doubles results
- Australian Open: 2R (2019)
- French Open: 2R (2021, 2025)
- Wimbledon: 2R (2016, 2021)
- US Open: 3R (2019)

Team competitions
- Fed Cup: 28–20
Medal record
Representing Kazakhstan
Women's tennis
Asian Games
Bronze medal – third place	2014 Incheon	Team event
Bronze medal – third place	2026 Aichi–Nagoya	Singles
Bronze medal – third place	2026 Aichi–Nagoya	Doubles
- Last updated on: 17 October 2026.

Yulia Antonovna Putintseva (Russian: Ю́лия Анто́новна Пути́нцева, pronounced [ˈjʉlʲɪjə ɐnˈtonəvnə pʊˈtʲintsɨvə]; born 7 January 1995) is a Russian-born Kazakhstani professional tennis player. She achieved a career-high singles ranking of world No. 20 on 27 January 2025, and a best doubles ranking of No. 57 on 16 June 2025.

Putintseva has won three singles titles on the WTA Tour and is a three-time major quarterfinalist (twice at the French Open and once at the US Open).

== Personal life ==
Yulia was born to Anton Putintsev and Anna Putintseva, and has a brother named Ilya. Born in Moscow, she resides in Boca Raton, Florida. She was introduced to sport by her father; she liked it, and was soon practising at Spartak Tennis Club in Moscow. Later, she moved to Paris to attend the Mouratoglou Tennis Academy, after winning an under-14s event. Her favourite surface is clay; her favourite tournaments are the Australian Open and US Open. Her tennis idols were Martina Hingis and Justine Henin. Since the beginning of June 2012 she has represented Kazakhstan.

== Juniors ==
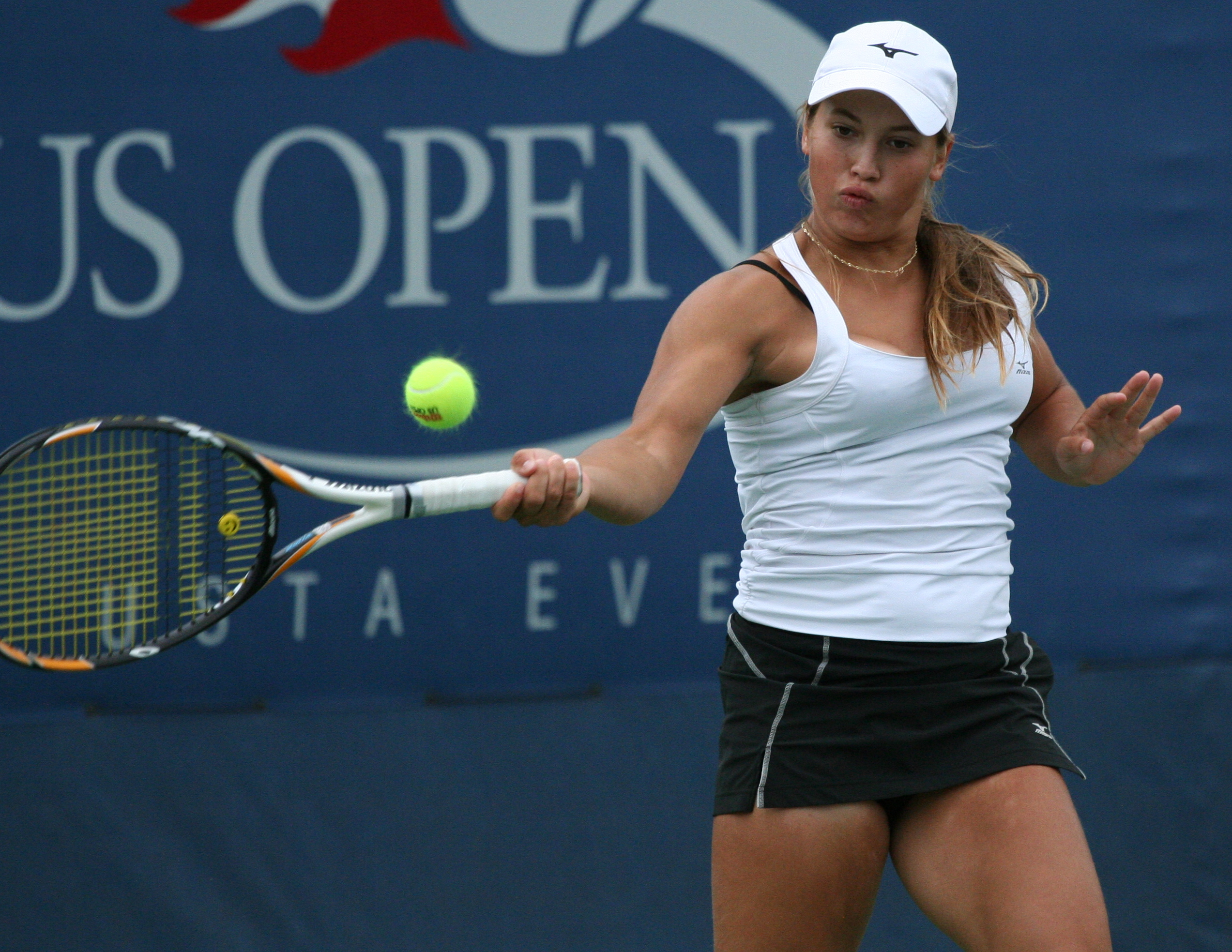
Putintseva at the 2010 US Open

Putintseva was successful as a junior; she achieved the rank of world No. 3 on 21 May 2012. Putintseva began playing on the ITF Junior Circuit in 2008 at the age of 13. In May 2009, she won her first junior title at the Grade-2 International Junior Tournament Città di Prato in singles event. In the following week, she won the Grade-1 "Citta' di Santa Croce", also in singles. She then played at the Grade-A Trofeo Bonfiglio, but lost to Sloane Stephens in the first round. She continued reaching two Grade-1 singles finals winning one of them. At the 2009 US Open, she made her major debut and also recorded her first match win, defeating Anna-Lena Friedsam. Later, she reached the final of Grade-1 Kentucky International Junior Tennis Derby, but lost to Zheng Saisai. She played at the Grade A Orange Bowl in December 2009, where she lost in the third round to Ajla Tomljanović.

In 2010, Putintseva continued to rise. She started the year reaching the quarterfinals of the Grade-1 Loy Yang Traralgon International. After the Australian Open second-round loss, she finished runner-up at the Open International Juniors de Beaulieu sur Mer. Soon after that, she won Grade-2 International Junior Tournament in Prato, that was her second title there. She then reached two Grade-1 semifinals. At Wimbledon, she reached her first Grand Slam semifinal, but then lost to Kristýna Plíšková. In August, she played for Russia at the Youth Olympic Games and reached the quarterfinals. She then reached the semifinals of the Grade-1 Canadian Open Junior Championships. In early September, she played her first Grand Slam final at the US Open, but lost to compatriot Daria Gavrilova. In November she reached the final of the Grade-1 International Junior Championships. In December, at the Dunlop World Challenge, she reached the quarterfinals, getting one step further than the previous year.

In 2011, Putintseva was not less successful than in the previous years. She started year with the final of the Grade-1 Traralgon International, where she lost to Monica Puig. It followed the third round of the Australian Open and quarterfinals at the French Open. She then had a successful grass-court season, finishing runner-up at the Grade-1 Junior International - Roehampton and as quarterfinalist of Wimbledon. At the US Open, she reached her third Grand Slam quarterfinal of the year. In early December, she won the Grade-1 International Junior Championships, defeating compatriot Victoria Kan in the final. She finished year with the final of the Dunlop World Challenge, where she lost to Anett Kontaveit.

2012 was her last season as a junior. She started year with the semifinals of the Grade-1 Loy Yang Traralgon International. Followed with this, she reached another major singles final, at the Australian Open, but failed to become Grand Slam tournament champion, losing to Taylor Townsend. Her last tournament was the French Open, where she finished as quarterfinalist. She won five singles titles in total on the ITF Junior Circuit.

== Professional ==
=== 2009–2011: Turning pro ===
Putintseva turned pro in 2009 at the age of 14. Her first tournament was the Luxembourg Open, where, as a wildcard player, she reached the final stage of qualifying, but failed to reach the main draw. Her next tournament was a $10k event in Amiens in March 2010 where she reached her first semifinal. In October 2010, she made her debut at the WTA Tour at the Luxembourg Open, but lost to Angelique Kerber in the first round. In May 2011, she won her first ITF title at the $25k event in Moscow. Soon after that, she won another $25k event, this time in Samsun, and then the $50k Tatarstan Open, defeating Caroline Garcia in the final.

=== 2012–2015: Improvement, federation switch ===
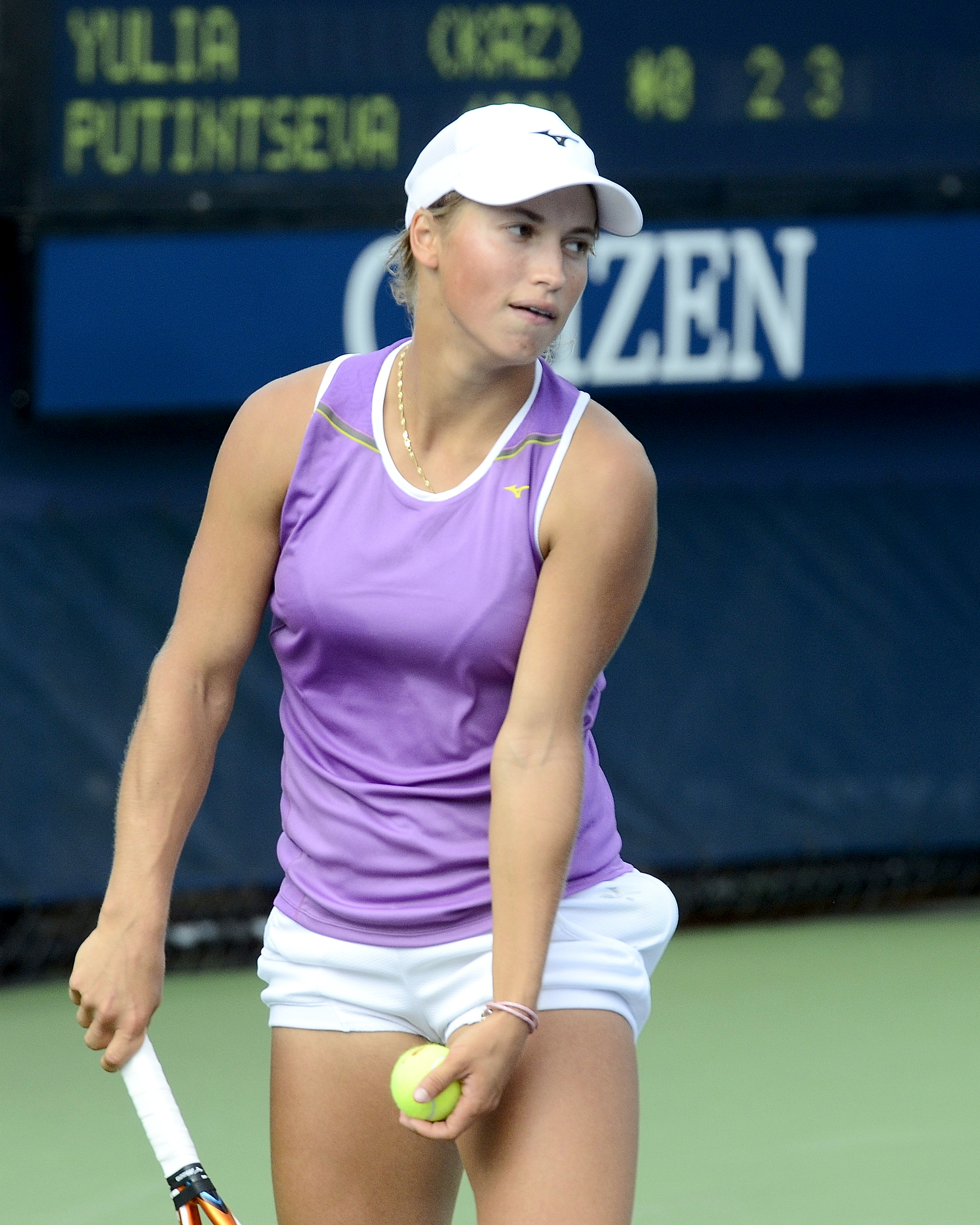
Putintseva at the 2014 US Open

Putintseva switched to representing Kazakhstan instead of Russia in 2012. During the 2012 season, she made improvements and won the $25k Launceston International, followed by semifinals of the $25k event in Almaty. She then recorded her first match win on the WTA Tour, defeating Karen Barritza in the first round, but then lost to former world No. 1, Jelena Janković. In May, she won the $100k Cagnes-sur-Mer, defeating Patricia Mayr-Achleitner in the final. She then made her debut in qualifying for a major at the French Open, but failed to reach the main draw. In August, she had her first opportunity to enter the main draw of a Premier 5 tournament, but lost in the second qualifying round of the Cincinnati Open. By the end of the year, she reached two ITF finals, at the $50k Open Nantes Atlantique and the $75k Dubai Challenge, respectively.

In 2013, Putintseva continued to progress. At the Australian Open, she made her Grand Slam main-draw debut, and recorded her first major match win, defeating Christina McHale. In the second round, she lost to Carla Suárez Navarro. At the Qatar Ladies Open, she played her first tournament as top-100 player, and made her Premier 5 main-draw debut, but lost to Mona Barthel in the first round. Unlike at the Indian Wells Open where she failed to qualify, she succeeded at the Miami Open, but lost to qualifier Donna Vekić in the first round of the main draw. During the 2014 season, Putintseva only reached two quarterfinals on the WTA Tour, at the Swedish Open and the Japan Women's Open, as well as one WTA 125 quarterfinal. In 2015, she reached her first tour semifinal at the Swedish Open and recorded her first top-10 win at the Nuremberg Cup, defeating world No. 10, Andrea Petkovic, in the first round. During the year, she also reached two $100k finals, at the Contrexéville Open and the Nanjing Ladies Open.

=== 2016–2017: French quarters, top 30 ===
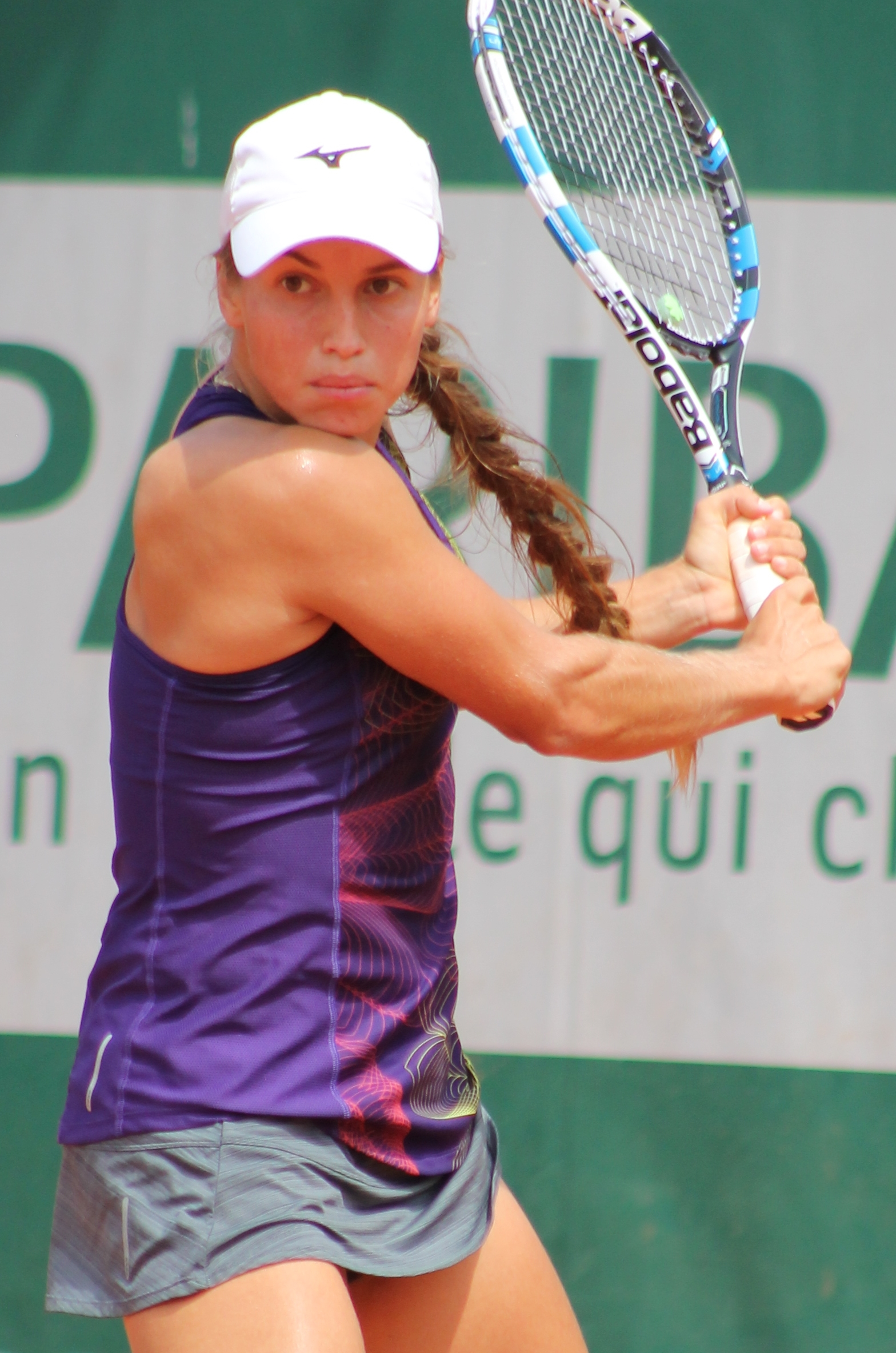
Putintseva at the 2016 French Open

Putintseva turned back on the track in 2016. At the Australian Open, she reached her first major third round after two wins in the main draw, including a win over former No. 1, Caroline Wozniacki. Right after that, she reached the semifinals of the Taiwan Open, where she lost to Venus Williams. At Indian Wells, after defeating Peng Shuai and Kristina Mladenovic, Putintseva lost to Serena Williams in the third round. In April, she reached her first Premier-level quarterfinal at the Charleston Open, where she again defeated Venus Williams. She followed this with a quarterfinal at the Morocco Open. At the French Open, she reached her first major quarterfinal, however, was beaten by Serena Williams. This helped her break through to the top 50 for the first time. She then reached another semifinal, at the Washington Open, but lost to Yanina Wickmayer. At the Pan Pacific Open, she made her second career top-10 win, defeating Madison Keys in the first round.

In the early beginning of the 2017 season, Putintseva reached her first WTA Tour singles final at the St. Petersburg Trophy. On the path to the final, she made two top-10 wins over world No. 8 Svetlana Kuznetsova, and No. 5 Dominika Cibulková, before she lost to Kristina Mladenovic. She then defeated world No. 15 and former top 10 player, Timea Bacsinszky, at the Qatar Ladies Open but then lost to Monica Puig. At the French Open, she did not repeat previous year result, losing to Garbiñe Muguruza in the third round. During the year, she also reached the quarterfinals at the Nuremberg Cup and Japan Women's Open.

=== 2018–2021: First career title ===
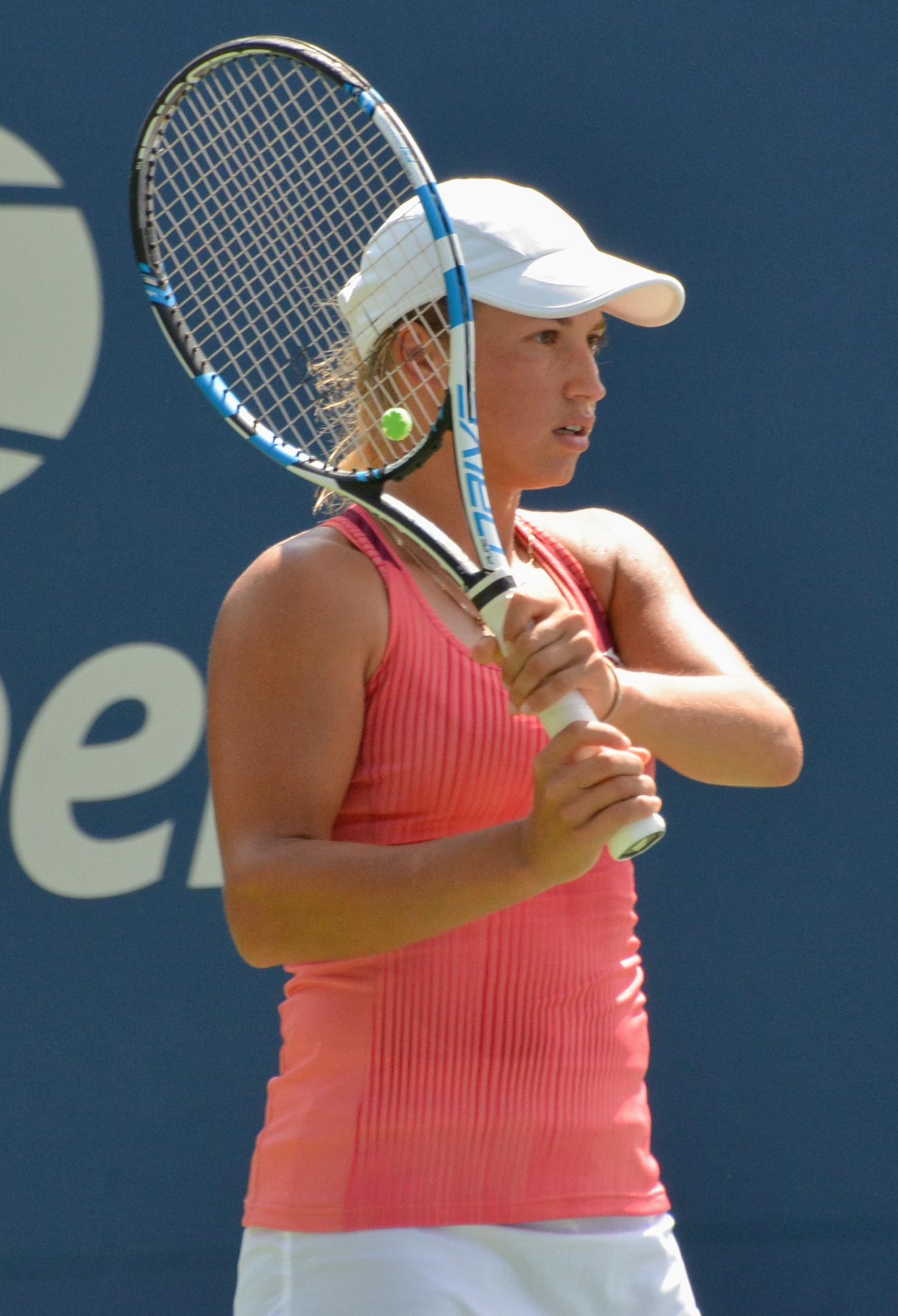
Putintseva at the 2018 US Open

Putintseva began 2018 by reaching the second round of the Hobart International, Australian Open, Indian Wells Open and the Istanbul Cup, and the quarterfinals of the Taiwan Open. She then defeated the top-10 player Sloane Stephens in the first round of Nuremberg Cup, but lost in the next round. Putintseva reached another quarterfinal at the French Open, where she lost to Madison Keys. After losses in the second round at Wimbledon and in the quarterfinals of the Washington Open, she reached her second career final, at the Guangzhou Open, but finished runner-up again.

Putintseva had mixed results in the 2019 season. In January, she reached the quarterfinals of the Premier-level Sydney International and recorded a top-10 win over Sloane Stephens in the second round, before losing to Kiki Bertens. She reached only the second round of the Australian Open and the Indian Wells Open, and the first round of the St. Petersburg Trophy and the Dubai Tennis Championships. She then reached her first Premier Mandatory round-of-16 at the Miami Open. There, she defeated Kirsten Flipkens, Belinda Bencic and Anastasija Sevastova, before she lost to Karolína Plíšková. At the Madrid Open, she advanced to the third round but lost to Ashleigh Barty. In May, she won her first WTA Tour singles title at the Nuremberg Cup defeating Tamara Zidanšek in the final. Then, after a first-round loss at the French Open, she reached the quarterfinals of the Premier-level Birmingham Classic, where she defeated world No. 1, Naomi Osaka. At Wimbledon, she created a big upset with another victory over Osaka, before losing in the second round to Viktorija Golubic. She lost in the early rounds at the Canadian Open, Cincinnati Open and Bronx Open. Putintseva then reached the third round of the US Open defeating world No. 13, Aryna Sabalenka, before losing to 23rd seed and eventual quarterfinalist, Donna Vekić. At the Japan Women's Open, she reached the quarterfinals, but this time Osaka gained her revenge winning in straight sets. Putintseva reached another WTA Tour quarterfinal later in the year, at the Tianjin Open, where she lost to Ons Jabeur.

Putintseva continued with varied results in 2020. During the first half of year, she reached the third round of Australian Open and the Qatar Ladies Open as her only significant results. After the WTA Tour was suspended for six months because of the COVID-19 pandemic outbreak, Putintseva returned in August at the Lexington Open, where she defeated Ajla Tomljanović but then lost to the eventual runner-up, Jil Teichmann. She followed this by reaching the second round of Cincinnati Open, where she lost to Maria Sakkari. She then reached her first US Open quarterfinal, beating world No. 15, Petra Martić, en route, before she lost to Jennifer Brady. She reached her first Premier-5 quarterfinal at the Italian Open, but then retired against the eventual champion, Simona Halep. She finished the year with an early loss at the French Open, losing to the qualifier Nadia Podoroska in the second round.

Putintseva started her 2021 season at the first edition of the Abu Dhabi Open. Seeded 13th, she reached the third round where she lost to top seed Sofia Kenin. Seeded 26th, she reached a consecutive third round at the Australian Open, her best major result for the season, where she lost to fifth seed Elina Svitolina. In July, she won the Budapest Grand Prix, defeating Anhelina Kalinina in the final.

=== 2022: WTA 1000 quarterfinal ===
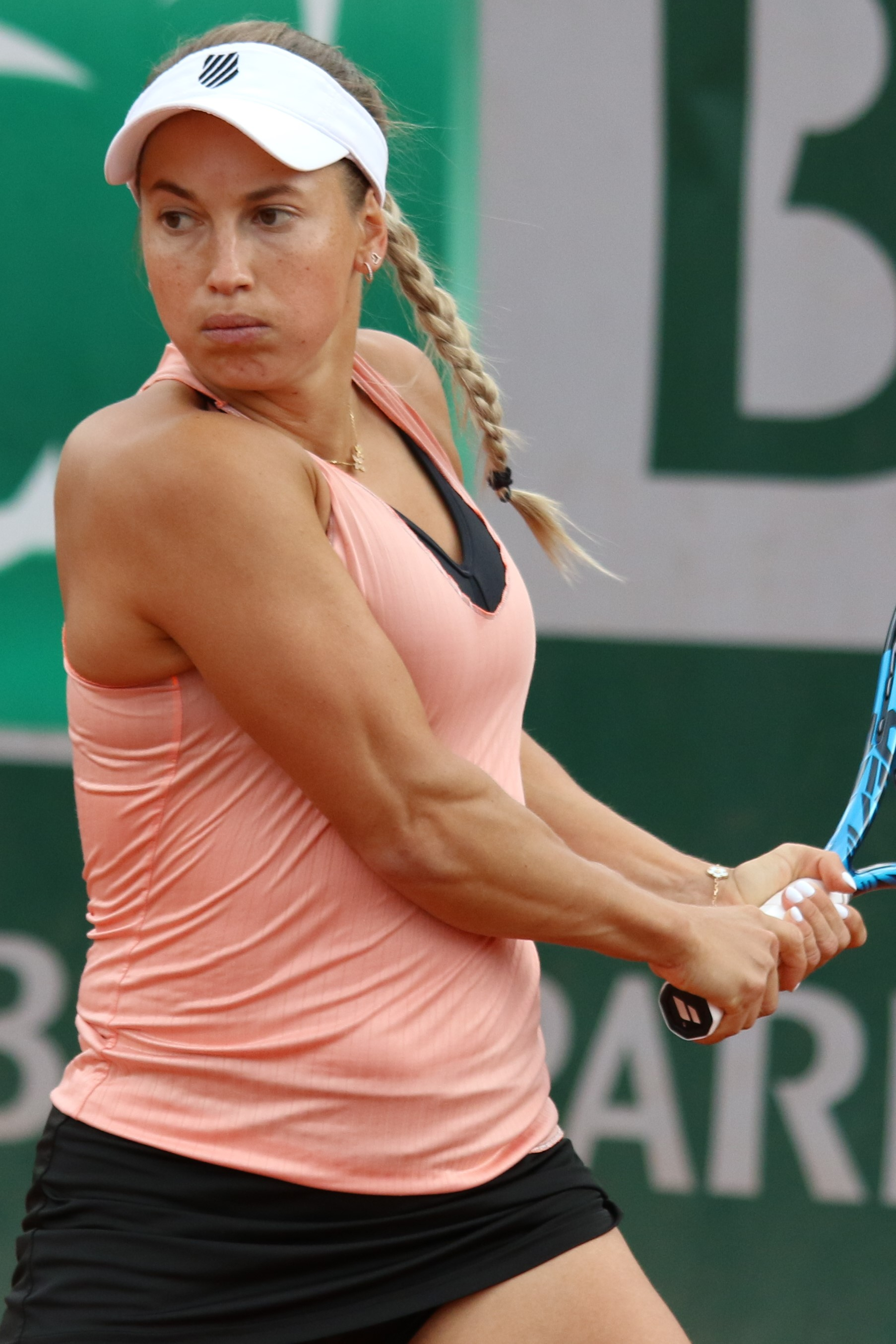
Putintseva at the 2022 French Open

Putintseva started her 2022 season at the Australian Open ranked world No. 42, and lost in the first round to Harmony Tan. In February, she played at Dubai where she was defeated in the final round of qualifying by Markéta Vondroušová. In Doha, she fell in the first round to 12th seed and two-time champion, Victoria Azarenka, despite having a match point in the third set. At the Indian Wells Open, she was eliminated in the second round by 31st seed Viktorija Golubic. At the Miami Open, she reached the third round where she lost to fifth seed Paula Badosa.

Putintseva began clay-court season at the Charleston Open where she lost in the second round to 15th seed and eventual semifinalist, Amanda Anisimova. Playing for Kazakhstan in the Billie Jean King Cup against Germany, Putintseva played one match which she won over Angelique Kerber, in three sets. In the end, Kazakhstan won the tie over Germany 3–1. At the İstanbul Cup, she upset sixth seed Ajla Tomljanović, in the quarterfinals. She lost in the semifinals to qualifier and eventual champion, Anastasia Potapova. In Madrid, she was beaten in the second round by 14th seed Coco Gauff. Getting past qualifying at the Italian Open, Putintseva upset world No. 10 and eighth seed, Garbiñe Muguruza, in the second round for her ninth career top-ten win. She lost in the third round to world No. 7 and eventual finalist, Ons Jabeur. Ranked world No. 37 at the French Open, she was defeated in the second round by 28th seed Camila Giorgi.

Seeded 16th at the Eastbourne International, Putintseva was ousted from the tournament in the third round by Anhelina Kalinina. Seeded 27th at Wimbledon, she lost in the first round to Alizé Cornet.

At the Canadian Open, she reached only her second quarterfinal at the WTA 1000-level defeating fourth seed and world No. 3, Paula Badosa, by retirement and Alison Riske. At the same tournament, she also reached the quarterfinals in doubles, partnering Sofia Kenin and defeating sixth seeds Jelena Ostapenko and Lyudmyla Kichenok.

=== 2023–2024: Birmingham title, doubles final ===
Putintseva started her 2023 season by representing Kazakhstan at the United Cup. Kazakhstan was in Group B alongside Switzerland and Poland. Against Switzerland, she lost to Belinda Bencic. Switzerland ended up beating Kazakhstan 5–0. Against Poland, she lost to world No. 1, Iga Świątek. Poland ended up winning the tie over Kazakhstan 4–1. Seeded eighth at the Hobart International, she reached the quarterfinals where she was defeated by qualifier Anna Blinkova. At the Australian Open, she was defeated in the second round by 30th seed Karolína Plíšková. Putintseva then competed at the Thailand Open. Seeded second, she lost in the first round to Heather Watson in three sets. She reached the third round of the French Open with wins over Maryna Zanevska and 19th seed Zheng Qinwen, before losing to Sloane Stephens.

In 2024, Putintseva started the season at the Auckland Open where she lost in the first round to sixth seed and world No. 22, Wang Xinyu. Getting past qualifying at the Hobart International, she won her first match of the year by beating Elisabetta Cocciaretto in three sets, despite trailing 6–0, 4–0. In the second round, she upset fifth seed and world No. 23, Marie Bouzková, before being defeated in the quarterfinals by fellow qualifier Yuan Yue. At the Australian Open, she lost in the first round to qualifier Anastasia Zakharova. She reached the fourth round in Indian Wells defeating Tamara Korpatsch, 15th seed Ekaterina Alexandrova, and 18th seed Madison Keys, all matches in straight sets. At Miami, she reached the quarterfinals defeating Cristina Bucșa, 13th seed Liudmila Samsonova, lucky loser Greet Minnen, and 32nd seed Anhelina Kalinina. As a result, she returned to the top 50 on 8 April 2024.

Putintseva again reached the quarterfinals of a WTA 1000 tournament at the Madrid Open, defeating Yuan Yue, sixth seed Zheng Qinwen, Caroline Dolehide, and tenth seed Daria Kasatkina to set up an all-Kazakhstani showdown with compatriot Elena Rybakina, the first two women from Kazakhstan to make it that far at this WTA 1000. She lost to Rybakina in three sets, after having match points on Rybakina's serve.

In June, Putintseva won her first grass-court title at the Birmingham Classic, defeating Clara Burel, Anhelina Kalinina, lucky loser Caroline Dolehide, Elisabetta Cocciaretto, and Ajla Tomljanović. She continued her good form into the next month, defeating world No. 1 Iga Świątek in round three at Wimbledon, before falling to Jeļena Ostapenko in straight sets. As a result, she returned to the top 30 in the singles rankings, on 15 July 2024.

At the Cincinnati Open, Putintseva upset top seed and defending champion, Coco Gauff, to reach the round of 16. In doubles at the same tournament, she reached the final with Leylah Fernandez, losing to the third-seeded pairing of Erin Routliffe and Asia Muhammad. As a result, she reached a new career-high doubles ranking in the top 100 on 26 August 2024.

At the US Open, Putintseva was eliminated from the tournament in the third round by Jasmine Paolini; during that match, when Putintseva was losing, she ignored two balls thrown to her by a ball girl, instead choosing to continuously stare at the girl, before catching the third ball thrown by the ball girl. Putintseva later apologised on social media.

=== 2025: Top 20 singles debut ===
Putintseva started her 2025 season at the Brisbane International where, after receiving a bye in the first round, she defeated McCartney Kessler, before losing to world No. 1 and eventual champion, Aryna Sabalenka. On 6 January, she reached a new career-high WTA singles ranking of world No. 25. She reached the semifinals at the Adelaide International, with wins over Donna Vekić, Ons Jabeur and sixth seed Diana Shnaider. Her run was ended by top seed Jessica Pegula.

She made it through to the third round at the Australian Open, losing to ninth seed Daria Kasatkina, and the French Open, where she was eliminated by sixth seed Mirra Andreeva.

In October, after an indifferent remainder of the season, Putintseva reached her first quarterfinal since January at the Jiangxi Open with wins over Victoria Jiménez Kasintseva and wildcard entrant Zheng Wushuang, before her run was ended by second seed Viktorija Golubic.

=== 2026: Australian fourth round ===
Putintseva defeated Beatriz Haddad Maia, Elsa Jacquemot and qualifier Zeynep Sönmez to make it into the fourth round at the Australian Open, at which point she lost to 29th seed Iva Jovic.

In July at the Iași Open, Putintseva recorded wins over qualifier Claire Liu and Alina Charaeva to reach her first WTA Tour quarterfinal of the year. She lost in the last eight to Mayar Sherif in a three set match lasting three hours and nine minutes.

== Career statistics ==
=== Grand Slam tournament performance timelines ===
Key
W	F	SF	QF	#R	RR	Q#	DNQ	A	NH

(W) winner; (F) finalist; (SF) semifinalist; (QF) quarterfinalist; (#R) rounds 4, 3, 2, 1; (RR) round-robin stage; (Q#) qualification round; (DNQ) did not qualify; (A) absent; (NH) not held; (SR) strike rate (events won / competed); (W–L) win–loss record.
To avoid confusion and double counting, these charts are updated at the conclusion of a tournament or when the player's participation has ended.

==== Singles ====
Tournament	2012	2013	2014	2015	2016	2017	2018	2019	2020	2021	2022	2023	2024	2025	2026	SR	W–L	Win %
Australian Open	A	2R	1R	1R	3R	2R	2R	2R	3R	3R	1R	2R	1R	3R	4R	0 / 14	16–14	53%
French Open	Q2	2R	Q3	2R	QF	3R	QF	1R	2R	1R	2R	3R	2R	3R	2R	0 / 13	20–13	61%
Wimbledon	A	1R	A	2R	2R	1R	2R	2R	NH	2R	1R	1R	4R	1R	1R	0 / 12	8–12	40%
US Open	Q1	A	Q2	1R	2R	2R	1R	3R	QF	1R	2R	1R	3R	2R	2R	0 / 12	13–12	52%
Win–Loss	0–0	2–3	0–1	2–4	8–4	4–4	6–4	4–4	7–3	3–4	2–4	3–4	6–4	5–4	5–4	0 / 51	57–51	53%

==== Doubles ====
Tournament	2015	2016	2017	2018	2019	2020	2021	2022	2023	2024	2025	2026	SR	W–L
Australian Open	A	1R	1R	1R	2R	1R	1R	1R	1R	1R	A	A	0 / 9	1–9
French Open	A	1R	1R	A	1R	1R	2R	1R	1R	1R	2R	1R	0 / 10	2–10
Wimbledon	A	2R	A	1R	1R	NH	2R	1R	1R	1R	1R	1R	0 / 9	2–9
US Open	1R	1R	1R	1R	3R	A	1R	1R	1R	1R	1R	A	0 / 10	2–10
Win–Loss	0–1	1–4	0–3	0–3	3–4	0–2	2–4	0–4	0–4	0–4	1–3	0–2	0 / 38	7–38
