= 2018 WTA Elite Trophy =

- Date: October 30 – November 4
- Edition: 4th
- Draw: 12S/6D
- Surface: Hard / Outdoor / Covered Court
- Location: Zhuhai, China
- Venue: Hengqin Tennis Center, Zhuhai

Champions

Singles
- (Australia) Ashleigh Barty

Doubles
- (Ukraine) Lyudmyla Kichenok / (Ukraine) Nadiia Kichenok
← 2017 ·	WTA Elite Trophy	· 2019 →

The 2018 WTA Elite Trophy was a women's tennis tournament played at the Hengqin International Tennis Center in Zhuhai, China. It was the 4th edition of the singles event and doubles competition. The tournament was contested by twelve singles players and six doubles teams.

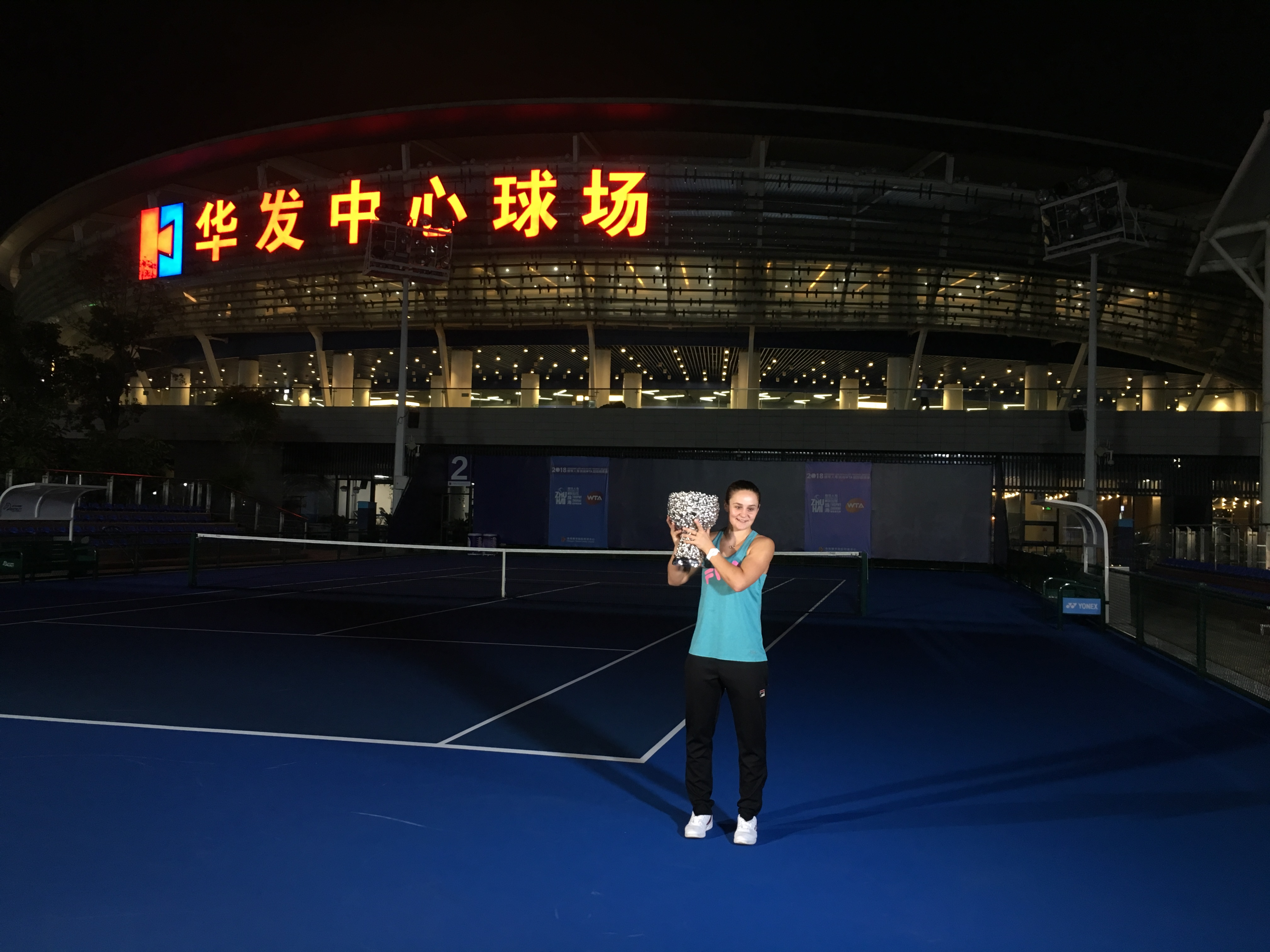
Women's singles Champion Ashleigh Barty

== Tournament ==
=== Qualifying ===
WTA Elite Trophy is an invitation-only event.

==== Singles qualifying ====
The field consists of the top eleven players not already qualified for the 2018 WTA Finals, plus either (a) the 12th-player not qualified for 2018 WTA Finals, or (b) a wild card. The final two alternates for the 2018 WTA Finals will be eligible to play in the WTA Elite Trophy even if they participate in the WTA Finals. Point totals are calculated by combining points obtained from sixteen tournaments. Of these sixteen tournaments, a player's results from the four Grand Slam events, the four Premier Mandatory tournaments, and (for Top 20 players at the end of 2018) the best results from two Premier 5 tournaments must be included.

==== Doubles qualifying ====
Two teams composed of players that did not compete in the WTA Finals singles (except Finals Alternates) or doubles competitions, using the players’ combined doubles rankings as of the Monday after the final regular-season Tournament of the current Tour Year to determine the order of acceptance; and up to two teams composed of players that did not compete in the WTA Finals singles (except Finals Alternates) or doubles competitions and that include at least one Elite Trophy Singles Qualified Player or Elite Trophy Alternate, using the higher of the players’ combined singles or doubles rankings as of the Monday after the final regular-season Tournament of the current Tour Year to determine the order of acceptance. Plus two wild cards. For each wild card not given out, the next highest pair of players shall become a participant.

=== Format ===
The singles event features twelve players in a round robin event, split into four groups of three. Over the first four days of competition, each player meets the other two players in her group, with the winner in each group advancing to the semifinal. The winners of each semifinal meet in the championship match. The six doubles teams will be split into two round robin groups, with the winner of each advancing to the final.

==== Round robin tie-breaking methods ====
The final standings of each group were determined by the first of the following methods that applied:

1. Greatest number of wins.
2. Greatest number of matches played.
3. In case of a 2-way tie:
  - Head-to-head results
4. In case of a 3-way tie:
  - Percentage of sets won
    - Head-to-head results
  - Percentage of games won
    - Head-to-head results
  - Finals Rankings

=== Global Ambassador ===
22 times majors winner, Steffi Graf was to be the event's global ambassador for the third consecutive year.

== Prize money and points ==
The total prize money for the 2018 WTA Elite Trophy Zhuhai was US$2,349,363 .

Stage	Singles		Doubles^{2}
Stage	Prize money	Points	Prize money
Champion	RR^{1} + $500,000	RR + 460	RR^{1} + $21,509
Runner-up	RR + $150,000	RR + 200	RR^{1} + $11,000
Semifinalist loss	RR + $14,727	RR	—
Round robin win per match	—	120	+$5,400
Round robin loss per match	—	40	—
Round robin first place	+$155,000	—	—
Round robin second place	+$80,000	—	—
Participation Fee	$45,000	—	16,500
Alternates	$10,000	—	—

- ^{1} RR means prize money or points won in the round robin.
- ^{2} Doubles does not award ranking points

== Qualified players ==
=== Singles ===
Seeds	Players	Points	Tours
1	(Russia) Daria Kasatkina	3,315	25
2	(Latvia) Anastasija Sevastova	3,185	22
3	(Belarus) Aryna Sabalenka	3,145	26
4	(Belgium) Elise Mertens	3,065	22
5	(Germany) Julia Görges	2,995	23
6	(United States) Madison Keys	2,817	15
7	(Spain) Garbiñe Muguruza	2,725	22
8	(France) Caroline Garcia	2,600	22
9	(Australia) Ashleigh Barty	2,420	20
10	(Estonia) Anett Kontaveit	2,375	23
11	(China) Wang Qiang	2,115	22
12/WC	(China) Zhang Shuai	1,370	27

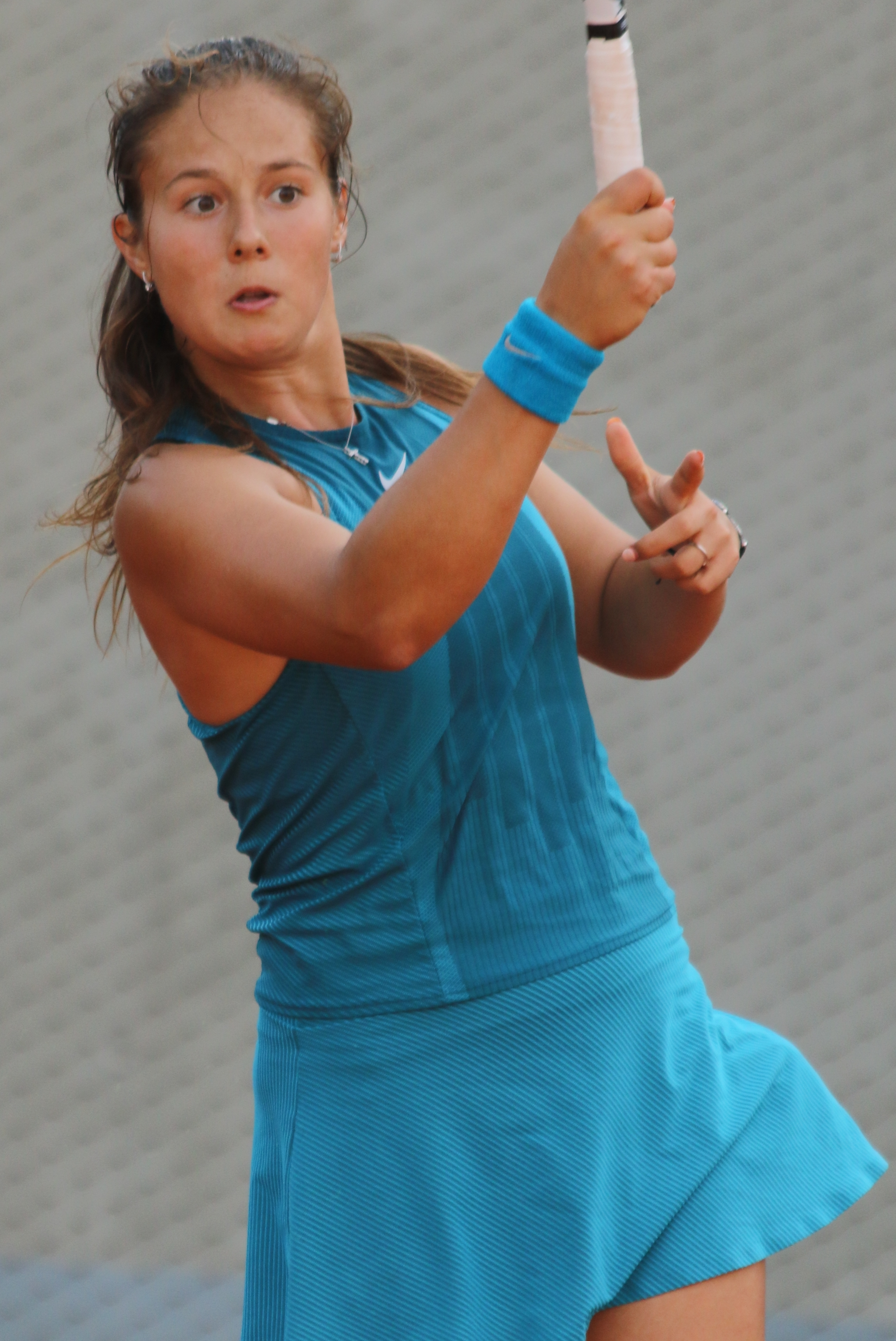
Kasatkina won at Moscow.

Daria Kasatkina had a breakthrough year, making it to the top 10 for the first time. Kasatkina did not begin the year well, picking up her first win of the year at the Australian Open but fell in the second round to Magda Linette. She bounced back by reaching the semifinals of the St. Petersburg Ladies' Trophy, losing to Kristina Mladenovic. She reached her first final of the year at the Dubai Tennis Championships but lost to Elina Svitolina. She then followed it up by reaching the biggest final of her career at the BNP Paribas Open, a Premier Mandatory event, but fell to Naomi Osaka. Her clay court season was average, reaching the quarterfinals of the Mutua Madrid Open, losing to eventual champion Petra Kvitová and reaching her first slam quarterfinal at the French Open but fell to Sloane Stephens. She backed up that slam performance, with a quarterfinal showing at the Wimbledon, losing to Angelique Kerber. Following that performance, Kasatkina was not able to maintain her form, failing to win back-to-back matches until the Asian swing, including a second round loss at the US Open to Aliaksandra Sasnovich. However, she ended the year by winning her first title of the year at the Kremlin Cup, defeating qualifier Ons Jabeur.

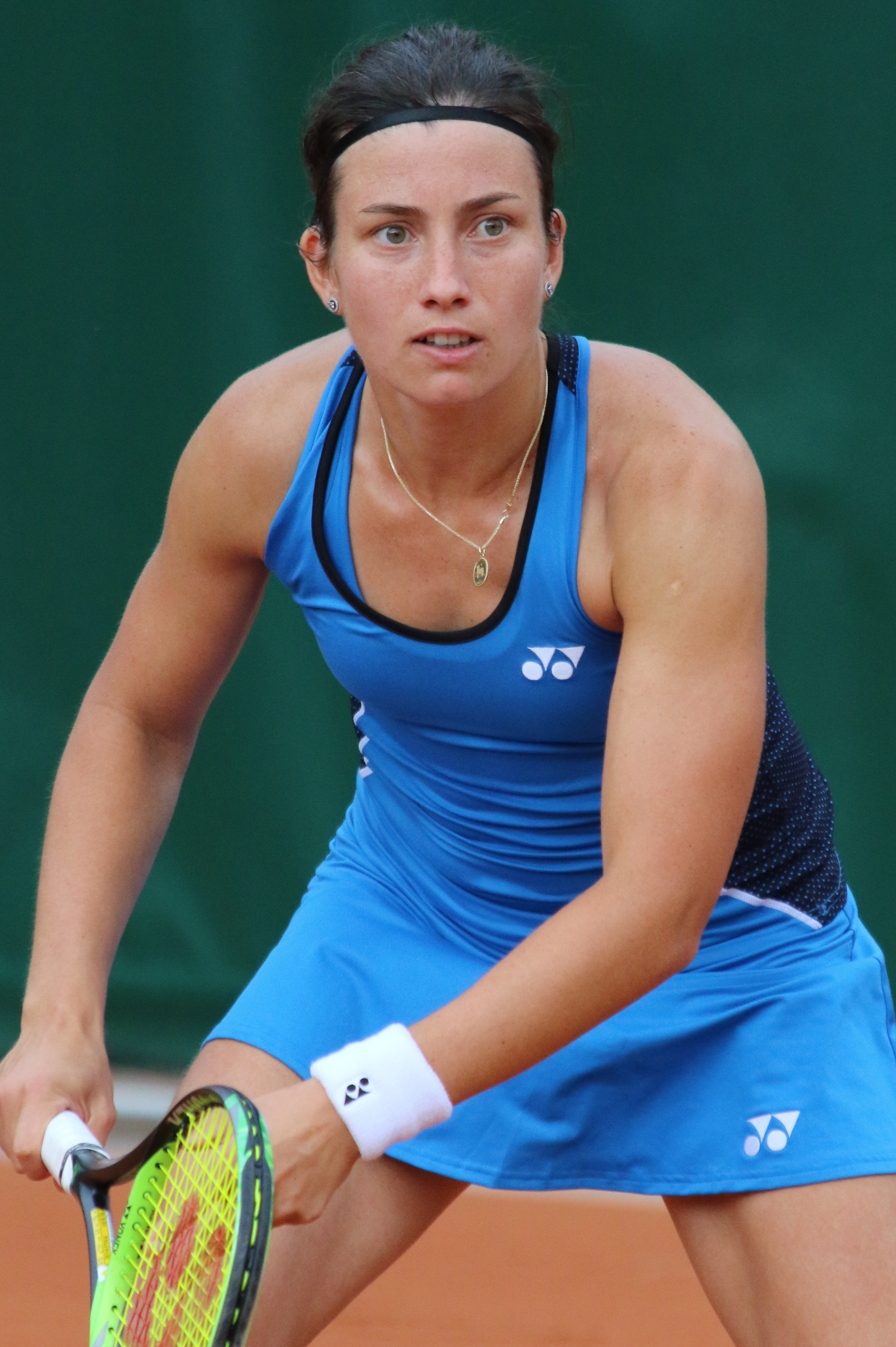
Sevastova reached the semifinals of the US Open.

Anastasija Sevastova began the year well by reaching the semifinals of the Brisbane International, losing to Aliaksandra Sasnovich. Sevastova failed to make any impact in the rest of the hard court season, including a second round to Maria Sharapova at the Australian Open. She did not reach her next semifinal until the Volvo Car Open, losing to Julia Görges. She then had disappointing results once again, including a first-round loss at the French Open to Mariana Duque Mariño. Being the defending champion at the Mallorca Open, she reached the final but lost to German Tatjana Maria. Despite this, she lost in the first round of Wimbledon to Camila Giorgi. She bounced back by winning her first title of the year at the Bucharest Open, defeating Petra Martić in straight sets in the final. She had relative success in his event preparing for the US Open. At the US Open, she reached her first slam semifinal after wins over Elina Svitolina and defending champion Sloane Stephens, but fell in the semifinals to Serena Williams. At the Asian swing, she reached her biggest final to date at the Premier Mandatory event of the China Open but lost to Caroline Wozniacki in straight sets.

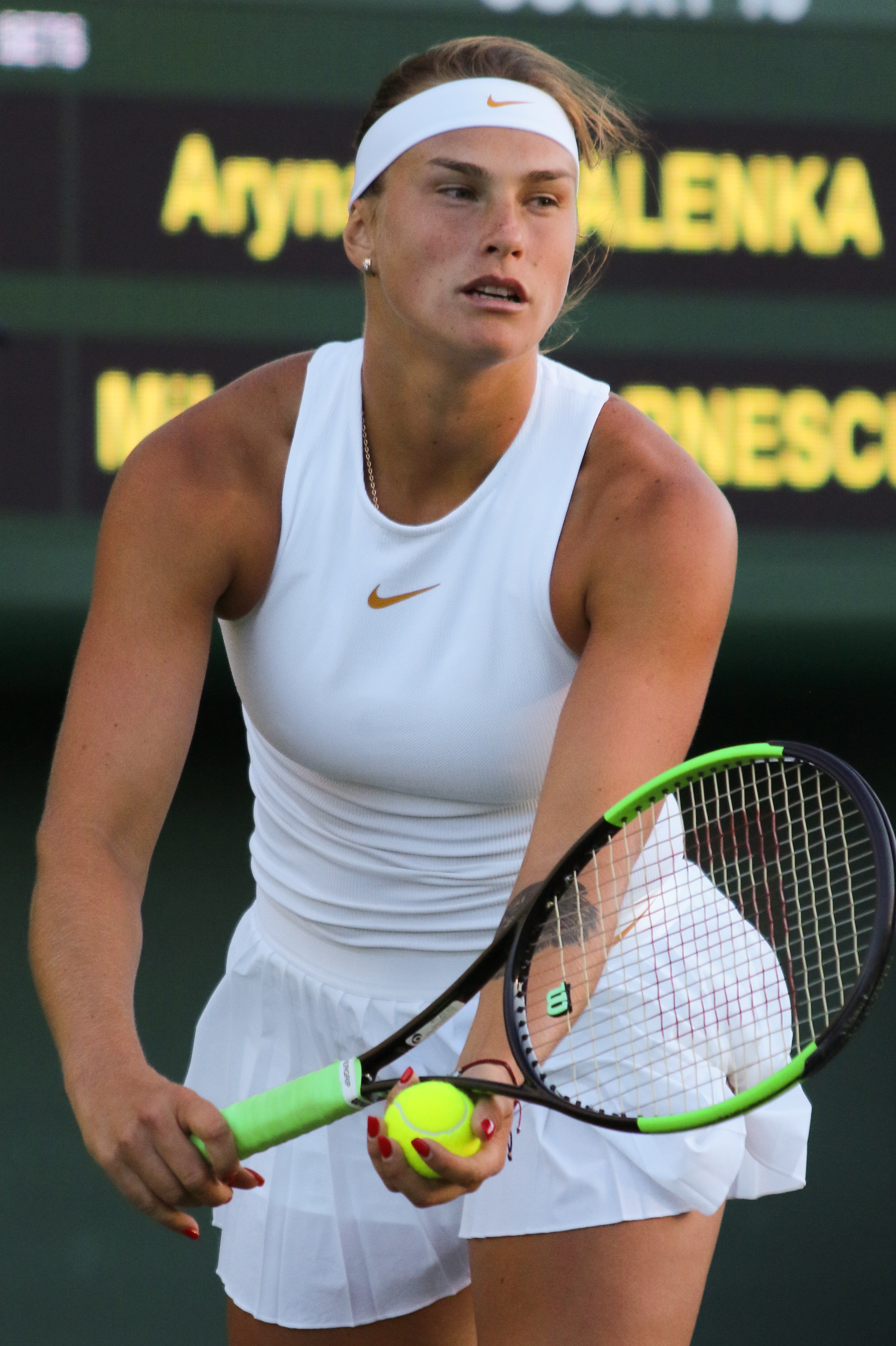
Sabalenka won at Wuhan.

Aryna Sabalenka had a breakthrough year, starting well by reaching the quarterfinals of the Shenzhen Open and Hobart International but losing to Simona Halep and Lesia Tsurenko, respectively. However, at the Australian Open, she lost in the first round to Ashleigh Barty. She did not make any considerable result until the Ladies Open Lugano, where she reached the final but ended up losing to Belgian Elise Mertens. However, she did not pick up any main draw win in the rest of the clay season, including losing in the first round of the French Open to Kiki Bertens. She then reached her first Premier final at the grass courts of the Eastbourne International, losing to top seed Caroline Wozniacki. Her slam woes continued, though, losing in the first round for the third time, this time at Wimbledon and to Mihaela Buzărnescu. At the Western & Southern Open, she made an impressive run, reaching the semifinal before losing to world no. 1 Halep. She followed it up by claiming her first career title at the Connecticut Open, defeating Carla Suárez Navarro in the final, breaking into the top 20 with the win. She ended her slam failures, when she reached her first slam fourth round at the US Open, losing to Naomi Osaka. She then won the biggest title of her career so far at the Wuhan Open, defeating Estonion Anett Kontaveit in the final.

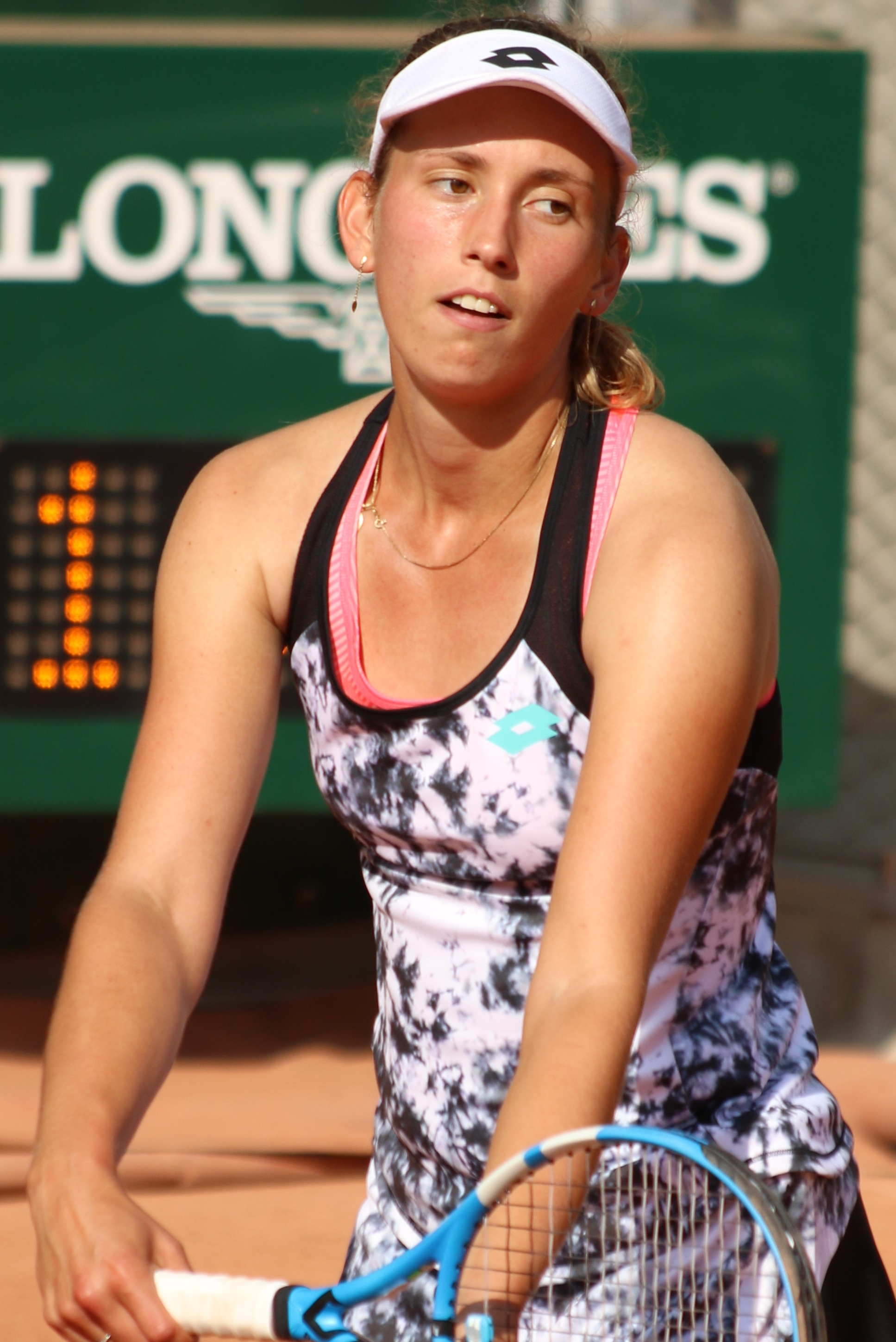
Mertens reached the semifinals of the Australian Open.

Elise Mertens began the year perfectly by defending her title at the Hobart International, defeating Mihaela Buzărnescu in the final. She carried this good form at the Australian Open, when she defeated 4th seed Elina Svitolina in the quarterfinals to reach her first slam semifinals. In the semifinals, she lost in two close sets to Caroline Wozniacki. However, she failed to win back-to-back matches up until the clay season. She began the clay season excellently by winning 13 matches in a row, including the Ladies Open Lugano, defeating Belarusian Aryna Sabalenka in the final, winning her two Fed Cup matches and winning the title at the Grand Prix SAR La Princesse Lalla Meryem, defeating Ajla Tomljanović. Her streak was ended by Simona Halep in the second round of the Mutua Madrid Open. At the French Open, she reached the fourth round but once again lost to Halep. At Wimbledon, she made the third round where she fell to Dominika Cibulková. At the US Open Series events, she reached the quarterfinals of both the Rogers Cup and Western & Southern Open, losing to Elina Svitolina and Petra Kvitová, respectively. At the US Open, she yet again improved from her performance from the previous year by reaching the fourth round, losing to Sloane Stephens.

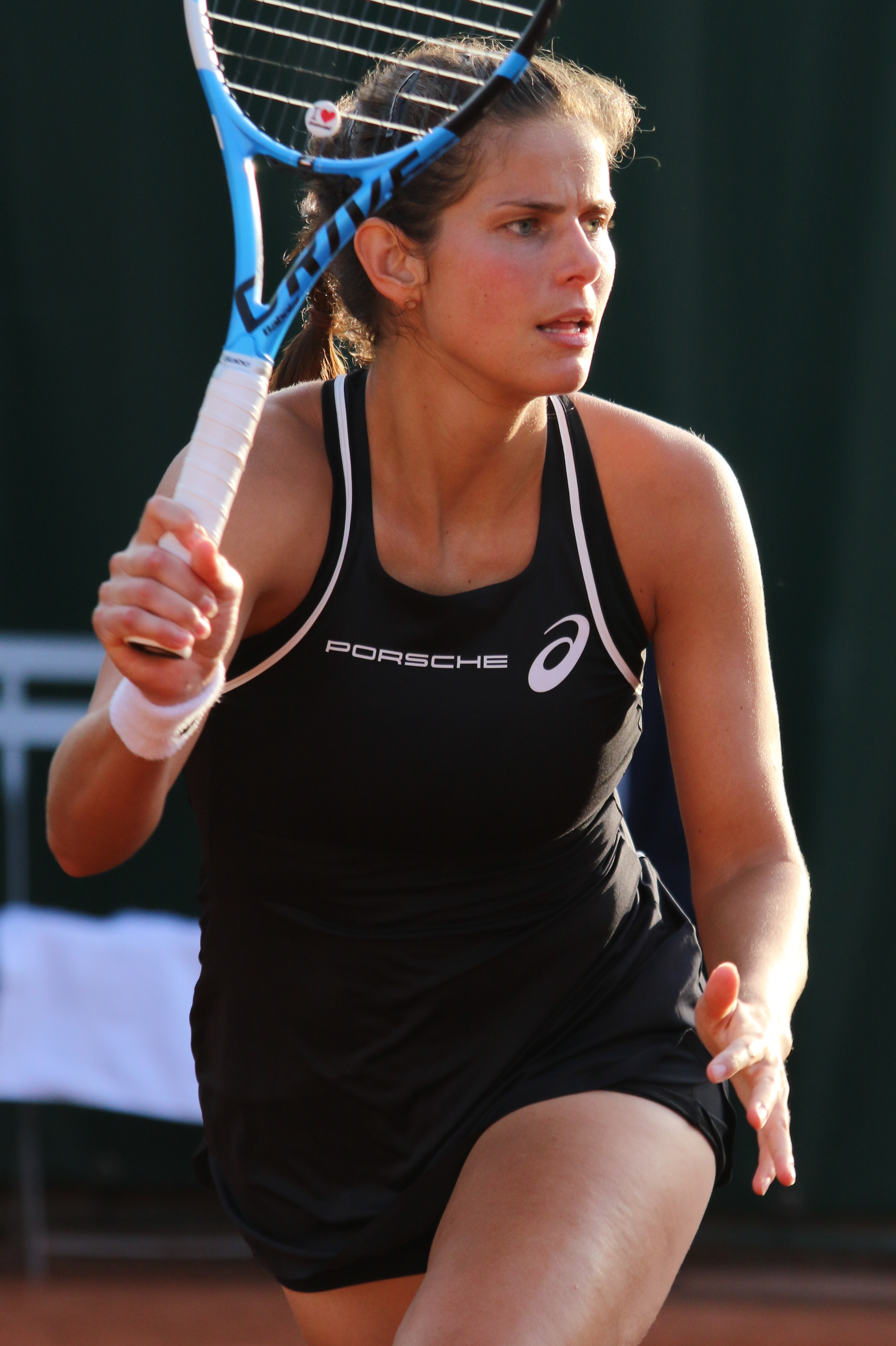
Görges is the defending champion.

Julia Görges continued her winning streak from the end of the season by winning the ASB Classic, defeating Caroline Wozniacki in the final. However, her 15-match winning streak was snapped when she was upset by Alizé Cornet in the second round of the Australian Open. However, she bounced back by reaching the semifinals of the St. Petersburg Ladies' Trophy, losing to Petra Kvitová. She reached her second final of the year at the Volvo Car Open but lost to Dutch player Kiki Bertens. The rest of her clay season was uneventful, failing to get past the third round of any event, including a third round loss to Serena Williams at the French Open. At Wimbledon, she reached her first-ever slam semifinals after defeating Kiki Bertens, but lost to Serena once again. She did not do anything special following this milestone until a semifinal showing at the Connecticut Open, losing to Aryna Sabalenka. At the US Open, she suffered a second round exit to Ekaterina Makarova. In the last regular event of the year, Görges claimed her second title of the year at the BGL Luxembourg Open, defeating Belinda Bencic in the final.

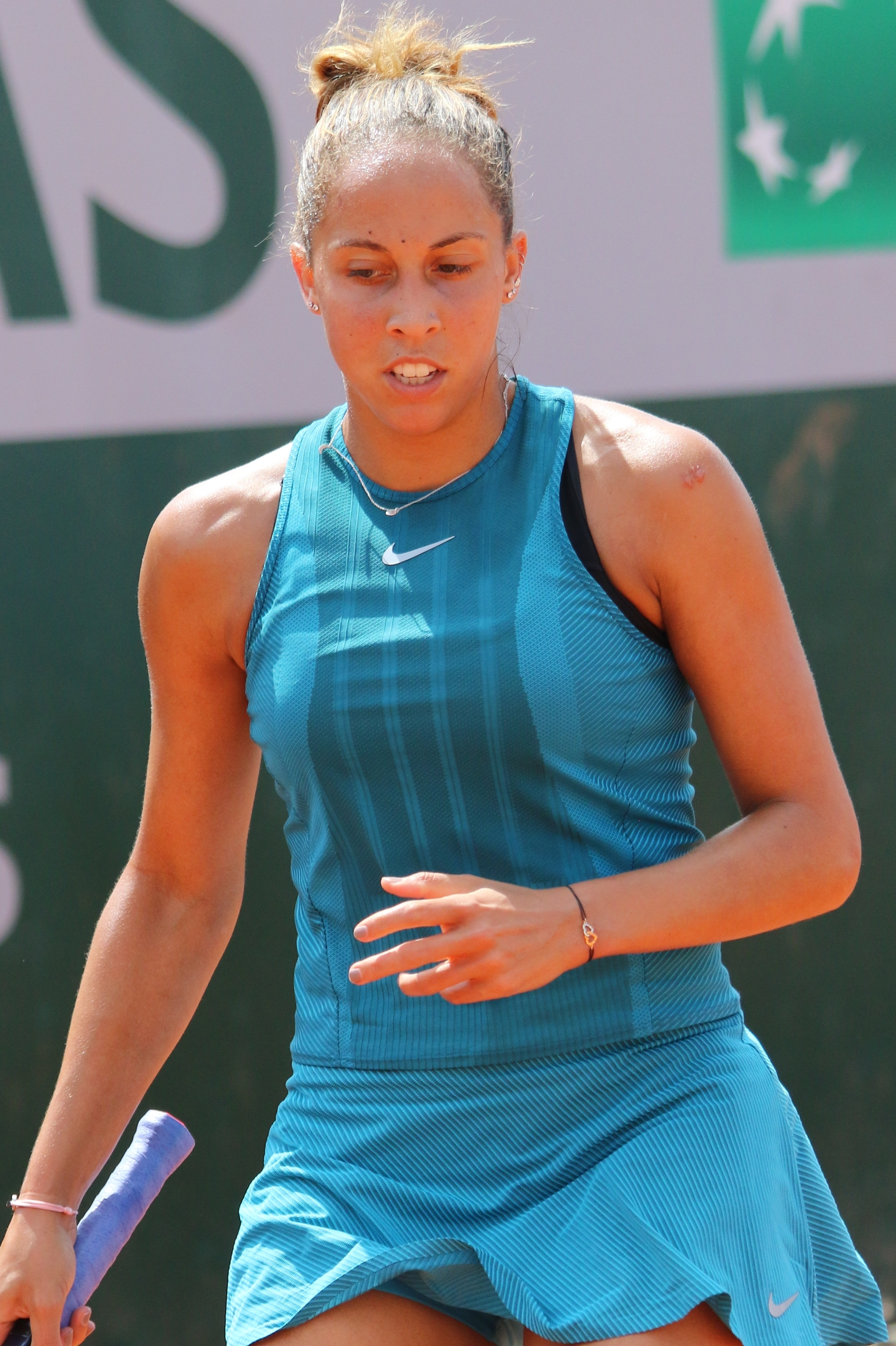
Keys reached the semifinals of the French and US Open.

Madison Keys' season was injury-plagued as she did not do well outside of the slams and she also did not reach a single final in the year. At the Australian Open, she reached the quarterfinals without dropping a set but fell convincingly to Angelique Kerber. She then went into the French Open with only one semifinal in-between the two slams when she reached the semifinals of the Volvo Car Open, losing to Kiki Bertens. However, despite this, she reached her first French Open semifinals again without dropping a set but fell to Sloane Stephens in straight sets. At Wimbledon, she had an upsetting loss to Evgeniya Rodina in the third round in three tight sets. Being a defending finalist at the US Open, Keys did quite well by reaching the semifinals but lost to Naomi Osaka.

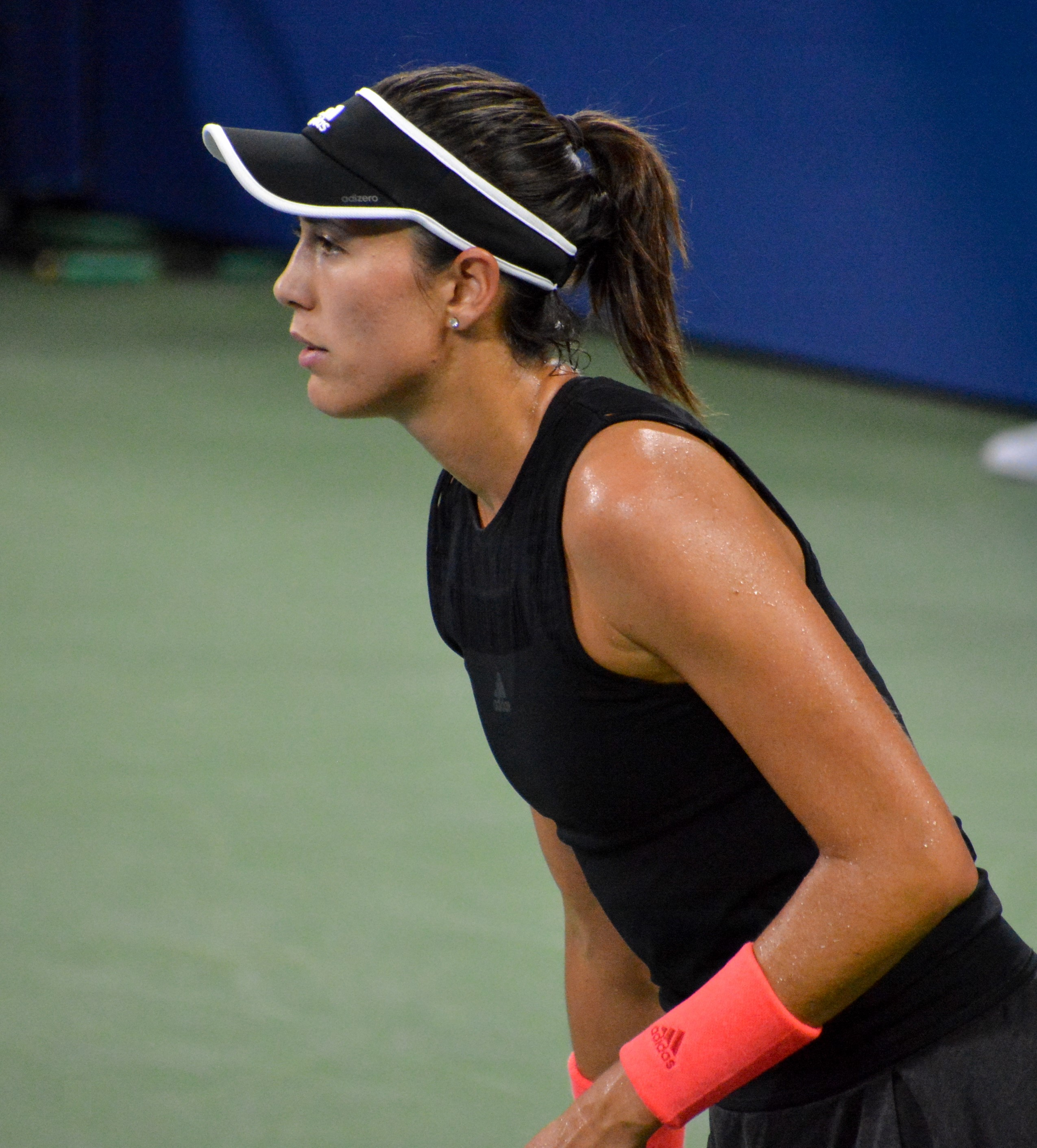
Muguruza won at Monterrey.

Garbiñe Muguruza entered 2018 as the 2nd ranked player but had a disappointing start of the season, including a second-round loss at the Australian Open to Hsieh Su-wei. Muguruza did well in the Middle East, when she reached her first final of the year at the Qatar Total Open but lost to Petra Kvitová, and the semifinals of the Dubai Tennis Championships, losing to Daria Kasatkina. She then claimed her first title of the year at the Monterrey Open, defeating Tímea Babos in three sets in the final. She did not perform too well in her next events up until the French Open, losing to Simona Halep in the semifinals. She entered Wimbledon as the defending champion but suffered an upset loss in the second round to Belgian Alison Van Uytvanck. The rest of her event delivered disappointing results including, a second-round exit at the US Open to Czech qualifier Karolina Muchova. However, she was able to reach the semifinals of the Hong Kong Tennis Open, losing to Wang Qiang.

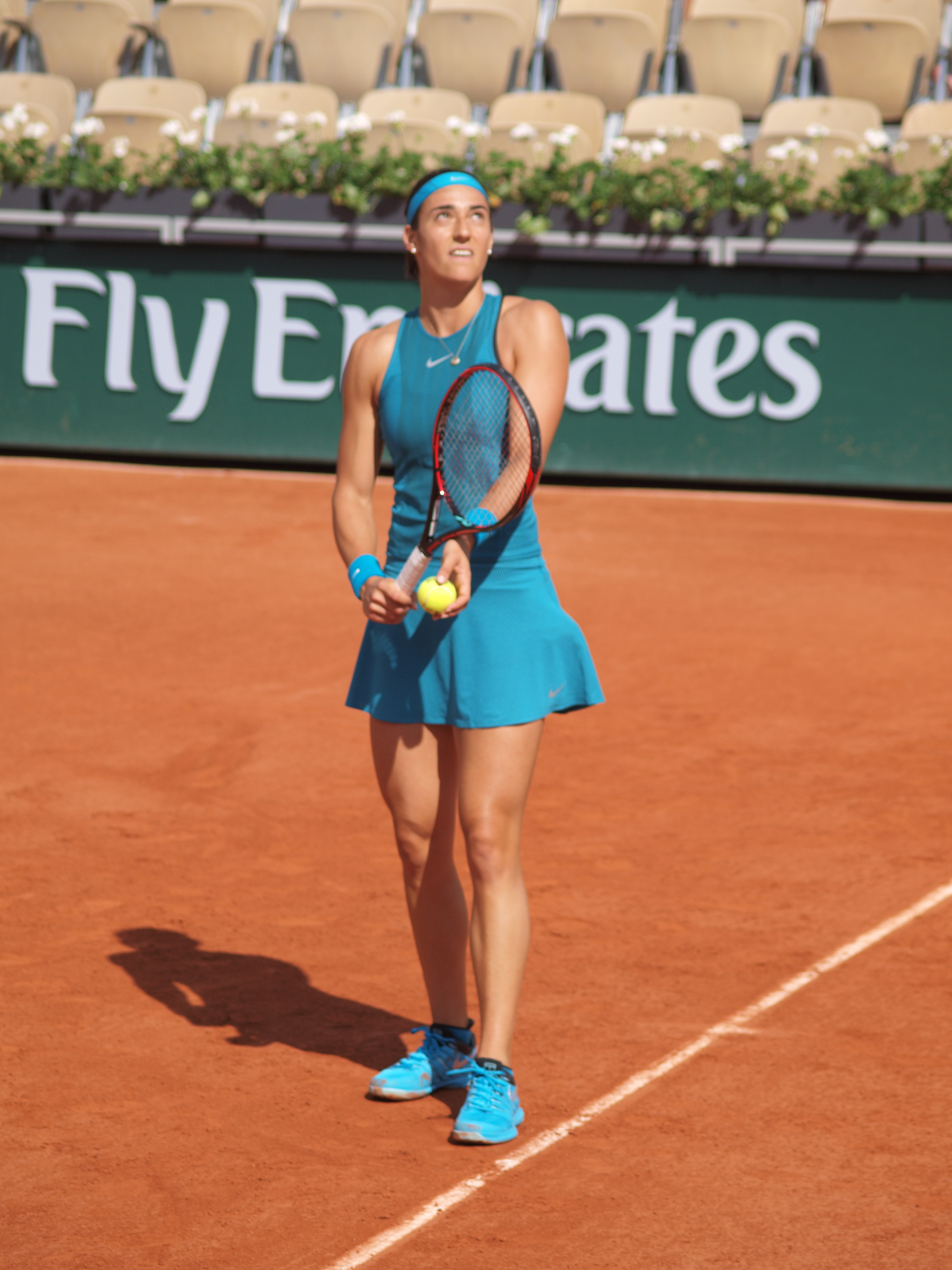
Garcia won at Tianjin.

Caroline Garcia reached a career high of no. 4 in the world following the US Open. Garcia reached her first fourth round at the Australian Open at the beginning of the year, losing to Madison Keys. She did not perform well until the clay season, reaching back-to-back semifinals at the Porsche Tennis Grand Prix and the Mutua Madrid Open, losing to CoCo Vandeweghe and Kiki Bertens, respectively. She then reached the fourth round of the French Open, losing to Angelique Kerber. At Wimbledon, she was upset by Belinda Bencic in the first round, her first first-round loss in a slam since the 2016 Australian Open. She then reached the quarterfinals of the Rogers Cup, losing to Simona Halep. At the US Open, she lost in the third round to Carla Suárez Navarro in a third set tiebreak. She suffered a massive ranking drop after failing to defend her titles at the China Open and Wuhan Open. However, she claimed her first title of the year at the Tianjin Open. defeating Karolína Plíšková.

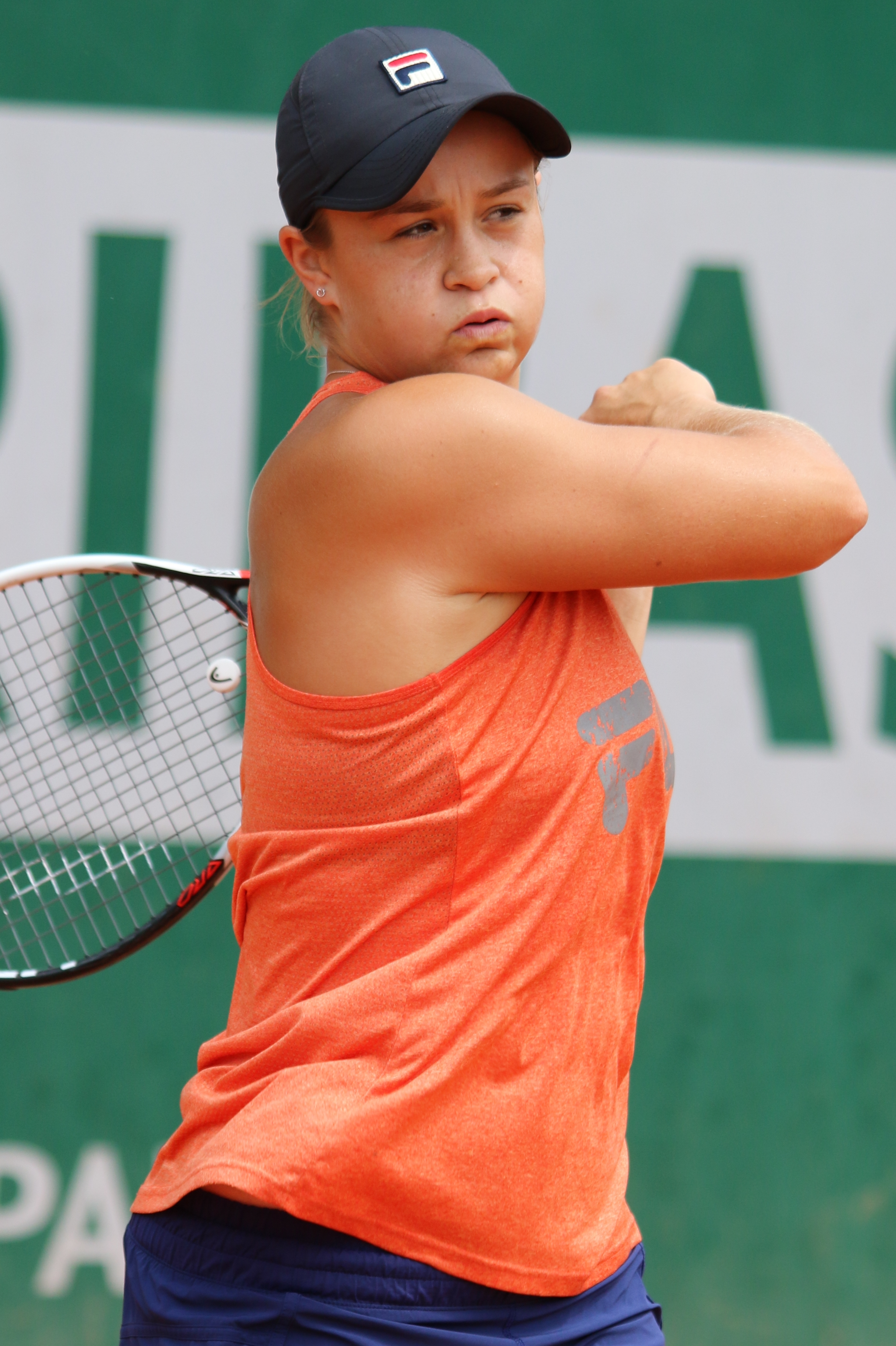
Barty won at Nottingham.

Ashleigh Barty reached her first final of the year at the Sydney International, where she lost in straight sets to Angelique Kerber. At her home slam of the Australian Open, she was able to reach the third round, losing to Japan's Naomi Osaka. Barty did not reach a semifinal until the week prior to the French Open, the Internationaux de Strasbourg, where she retired down a set due to a back injury. At the French Open, she drew a returning Serena Williams in the second round and lost in three sets. However, she bounced back by winning her second career title at the Nottingham Open, defeating Johanna Konta in the final. Despite this, she lost in the third round of Wimbledon to Daria Kasatkina. Her next event was at the Premier 5 event of the Rogers Cup, reaching the semifinals, where she lost to world no. 1 Simona Halep. At the US Open, she reached the fourth round of a slam for the first time but lost to Karolína Plíšková in straight sets. As the defending finalist at the Wuhan Open, she was able to reach the semifinals, losing to eventual champion Aryna Sabalenka.

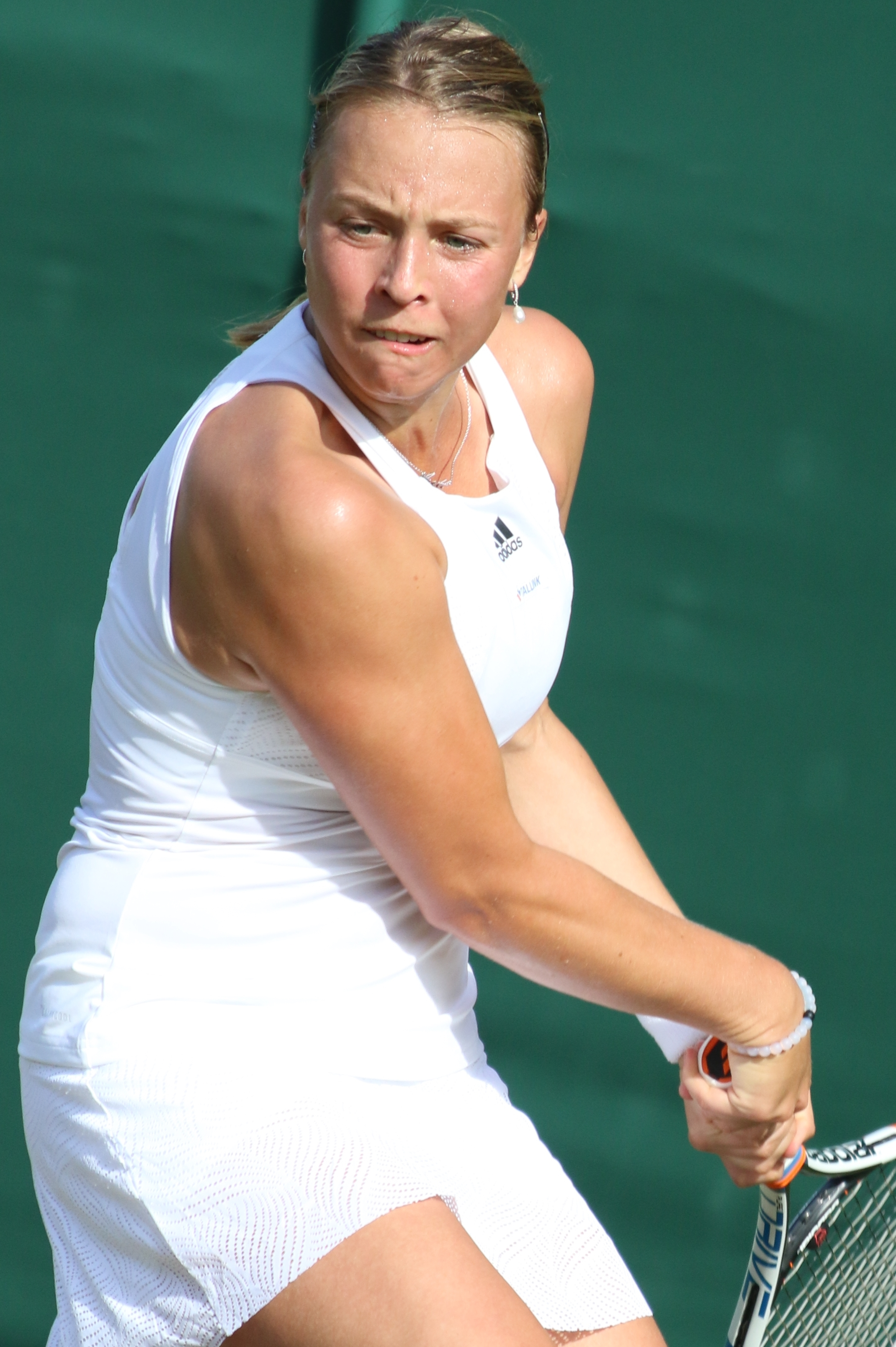
Kontaveit reached the finals of Wuhan.

Anett Kontaveit broke through the top 20 in 2018. Kontaveit was able to reach the fourth round of the Australian Open, losing to Carla Suárez Navarro. She was not able to win back-to-back matches until the Porsche Tennis Grand Prix, reaching the semifinals before losing to Karolína Plíšková. At the Italian Open, she was able to reach her first Premier 5 semifinal, before losing to Elina Svitolina. She followed it up with another fourth round showing at a slam at the French Open, losing to Sloane Stephens. At the grass season, she did not win a match until Wimbledon, where she reached the third round, losing to Alison Van Uytvanck. At the US Open, she was upset by Kateřina Siniaková in the first round in three tight sets, despite serving for the match in the third set. At the Wuhan Open, she was able to reach her first Premier 5 final but lost convincingly to Aryna Sabalenka.

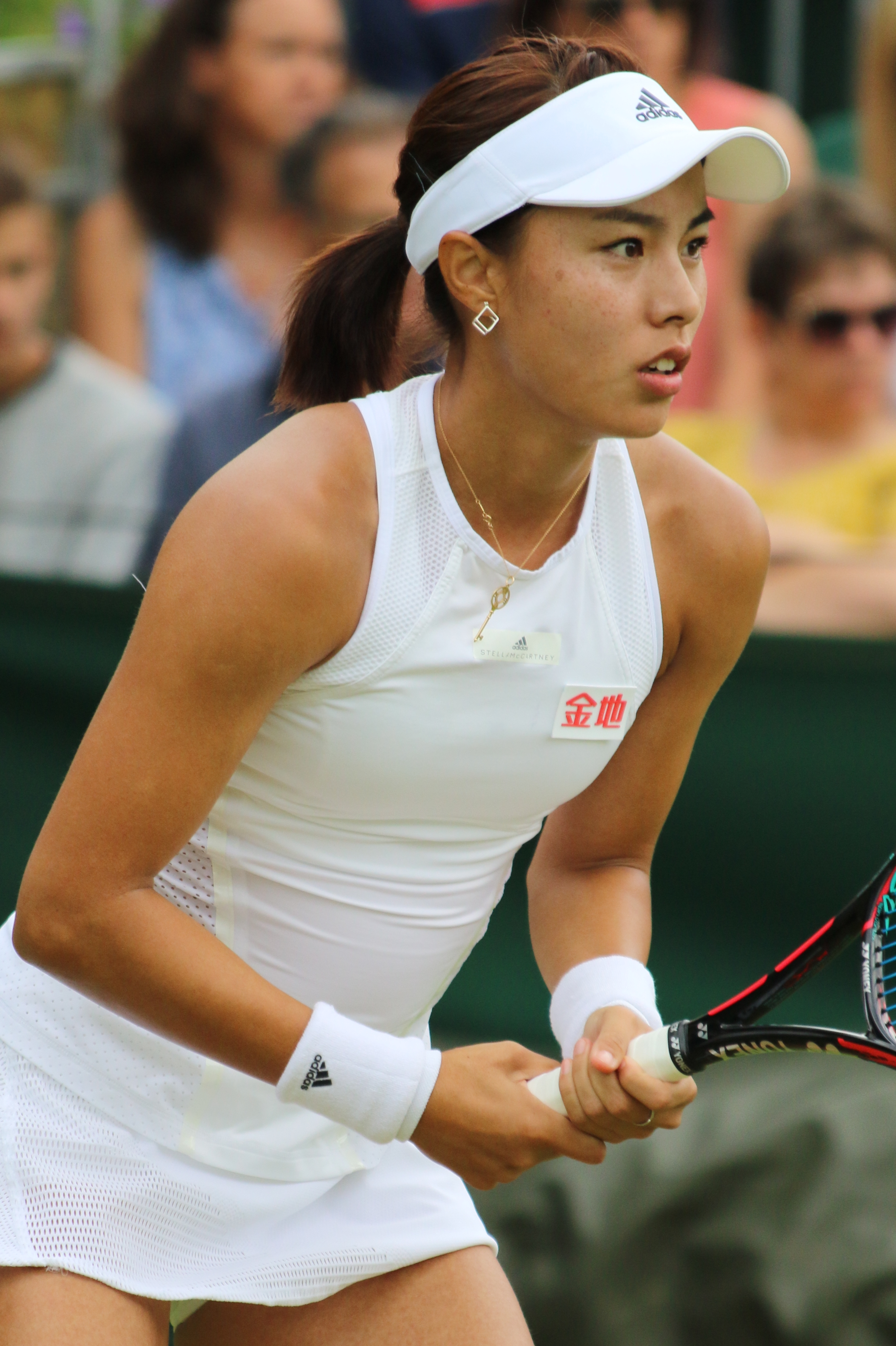
Wang won two titles.

Wang Qiang's first half of the season was poor, including a first round exit at the Australian Open to Madison Keys. She did not win back-to-back matches until she reached the fourth round of the BNP Paribas Open, losing to world no. 1 Simona Halep. She then suffered many early loses following the Indian Wells result, but reached the third round of a slam for the first time at the French Open, losing to Yulia Putintseva. At Wimbledon, she lost in the first round to compatriot Zheng Saisai. However, at the Jiangxi International Women's Tennis Open, she won her first career title avenging her Wimbledon loss when she defeated Zheng in the final. However, she was not able to sustain this form, failing to win a main draw match until the US Open, where she lost in the third round to Elina Svitolina. Her Asian swing results were impressive, which began with her second career title at the Guangzhou International Women's Open, defeating Yulia Putintseva in the final. She then reached the semifinals of the Wuhan Open and China Open, losing to eventual champions Aryna Sabalenka and Caroline Wozniacki, respectively. This is her first Premier 5 and Mandatory semifinals. She then reached her third final of the year at the Hong Kong Tennis Open but suffered her first final loss to Dayana Yastremska.

Zhang Shuai was the wildcard recipient for the event. Her best result of the year was reaching the semifinals of three international events, at the J&T Banka Prague Open, losing to Petra Kvitová; Japan Women's Open, losing to Amanda Anisimova; and the Hong Kong Tennis Open, losing to Dayana Yastremska. She was also able to reach the quarterfinals of the China Open, losing to Naomi Osaka. At the slams, she lost in the second rounds of the Australian Open and French Open to Denisa Allertová and Irina-Camelia Begu, respectively. Also, in the first rounds of Wimbledon to Andrea Petkovic and US Open to Garbiñe Muguruza.

== Points breakdown ==
=== Singles ===
Updated as of 23 October 2018.

- Players in gold have qualified.
- The player in dark gold was awarded a wildcard.
- Players in brown have withdrawn.

Rank	Athlete	Grand Slam tournament				Premier Mandatory				Best Premier 5		Best other						Total points	Tours	Titles
Rank	Athlete	AUS	FRA	WIM	USO	INW	MIA	MAD	BEI	1	2	1	2	3	4	5	6	Total points	Tours	Titles
10	(Russia) Daria Kasatkina	R64; 70	QF; 430	QF; 430	R64; 70	F 650	R64; 10	QF; 215	R64; 10	R16; 105	R16; 105	W 470	F 305	SF; 185	QF; 100	QF; 100	R32; 60	3315	25	1
11	(Latvia) Anastasija Sevastova	R64; 70	R128; 10	R128; 10	SF; 780	R16; 120	R32; 65	R32; 65	F 650	QF; 190	R16; 105	W 280	SF; 185	SF; 185	SF; 185	F 180	R16; 105	3185	22	1
12	(Belarus) Aryna Sabalenka	R128; 10	R128; 10	R128; 10	R16; 240	R32; 65	R64; 35	R64; 30	QF; 215	W 900	SF; 350	W 470	F 305	F 180	W 160	R16; 105	QF; 60	3145	26	2
13	(Belgium) Elise Mertens	SF; 780	R16; 240	R32; 130	R16; 240	R64; 10	R32; 65	R32; 65	R64; 10	QF; 190	QF; 190	W 280	W 280	W 280	SF; 185	QF; 60	R32; 60	3065	22	3
14	(Germany) Julia Görges	R64; 70	R32; 130	SF; 780	R64; 70	R32; 65	R64; 10	R16; 120	R16; 120	QF; 190	R16; 105	F 305	W 280	W 280	SF; 185	SF; 185	QF; 100	2995	23	2
15	(United States) Serena Williams	A 0	R16; 240	F 1300	F 1300	R32; 65	R128; 10	A 0	A 0	R32; 60		R32; 1						2976	7	0
16	(United States) Madison Keys	QF; 430	SF; 780	R32; 130	SF; 780	R64; 10	R64; 10	R64; 10	R32; 65	QF; 190	R16; 105	SF; 185	R32; 60	R32; 60	R32; 1	R32; 1		2817	15	0
17	(Spain) Garbiñe Muguruza	R64; 70	SF; 780	R64; 70	R64; 70	R64; 10	R16; 120	R16; 120	R32; 65	F 585	A 0^{±}	W 280	SF; 185	SF; 110	R16; 105	QF; 100	R16; 55	2725	22	1
18	(France) Caroline Garcia	R16; 240	R16; 240	R128; 10	R32; 130	R16; 120	R64; 10	SF; 390	R16; 120	QF; 190	QF; 190	W 280	QF; 190	SF; 185	R16; 105	QF; 100	QF; 100	2600	22	1
19	(Australia) Ashleigh Barty	R32; 130	R64; 70	R32; 130	R16; 240	R64; 10	R16; 120	R32; 65	A 0	SF; 350	SF; 350	F 305	W 280	SF; 110	R16; 105	QF; 100	R16; 55	2420	20	1
20	(Estonia) Anett Kontaveit	R16; 240	R16; 240	R32; 130	R128; 10	R64; 10	R64; 10	R16; 120	R16; 120	F 585	SF; 350	SF; 185	R16; 105	QF; 100	R32; 60	R16; 55	R16; 55	2375	23	0
21	(Latvia) Jeļena Ostapenko	R32; 130	R128; 10	SF; 780	R32; 130	R32; 65	F 650	R64; 10	R32; 65	QF; 190	R64; 1	QF; 100	QF; 100	QF; 100	R16; 30	R32; 1	R64; 1	2363	21	0
22	(China) Wang Qiang	R128; 10	R32; 130	R128; 10	R32; 130	R16; 120	R128; 10	R64; 10	SF; 390	SF; 350	R64; 30	W 280	W 280	F 180	SF; 110	QF; 60	R16; 55	2155	22	2
Alternates
24	(Romania) Mihaela Buzărnescu	R128; 10	R16; 240	R32; 130	A 0	R128; 10	R128; 10	R64; 10	R64; 10	R16; 105	W 100^{‡}	W 470	SF; 185	F 180	F 180	SF; 110	SF; 110	1860	28	1
28	(Chinese Taipei) Hsieh Su-wei	R16; 240	R128; 10	R16; 240	R64; 70	R64; 65	R32; 65	R16; 55^{†}	R64; 10	R32; 90	QF; 60^{‡}	W 280	SF; 110	SF; 110	SF; 110	SF; 110	F 95	1720	27	1
Wildcard
36	(China) Zhang Shuai	R64; 70	R64; 70	R128; 10	R128; 10	R32; 65	R64; 10	R32; 65	QF; 215	R16; 105	R32; 60	W 160	W 140	SF; 110	SF; 110	SF; 110	QF; 60	1370	27	0

† The player's ranking at the time did not qualify her to play this event. Accordingly, the player's next best result is counted in its place.

‡ The player was not a Top 20 player at the end of 2017 and therefore, was not required to count her two best Premier 5 results. Accordingly, the player's next best result is counted in its place.

± Muguruza incurred a zero-point penalty for her late withdrawal from Montreal since she was a top 10 player at the end of 2017.

=== Doubles ===
Country	Player	Country	Player	Rank^{1}
ROU	Mihaela Buzărnescu	POL	Alicja Rosolska	53
JPN	Miyu Kato	JPN	Makoto Ninomiya	65
UKR	Lyudmyla Kichenok	UKR	Nadiia Kichenok	72
JPN	Shuko Aoyama	BLR	Lidziya Marozava	83

- ^{1} Rankings as of 22 October 2018

==== Other entrants ====
The following pairs received wildcards into the doubles draw:

- (China) Jiang Xinyu / (China) Yang Zhaoxuan
- (China) Xun Fangying / (China) Tang Qianhui

== Champions ==
=== Singles ===
- (Australia) Ashleigh Barty def. (China) Wang Qiang, 6–3, 6–4

=== Doubles ===
- (Ukraine) Lyudmyla Kichenok / (Ukraine) Nadiia Kichenok def. (Japan) Shuko Aoyama / (Belarus) Lidziya Marozava, 6–4, 3–6, [10–7]

== See also ==
- 2018 WTA Finals
- 2018 ATP Finals
