= 2018 Japan Women's Open – Doubles =

Doubles
- 2018 Japan Women's Open

Final
- Champions: (Japan) Eri Hozumi (China) Zhang Shuai
- Runners-up: (Japan) Miyu Kato (Japan) Makoto Ninomiya
- Score: 6–2, 6–4

Events
Singles	Doubles
← 2017 ·	Japan Women's Open	· 2019 →

Shuko Aoyama and Yang Zhaoxuan were the defending champions, but Yang chose not to participate. Aoyama played alongside Duan Yingying, but lost in the semifinals to Eri Hozumi and Zhang Shuai.

Hozumi and Zhang went on to win the title, defeating Miyu Kato and Makoto Ninomiya in the final, 6–2, 6–4.

== Seeds ==
1. (Japan) Miyu Kato / (Japan) Makoto Ninomiya (final)
2. (Japan) Eri Hozumi / (China) Zhang Shuai (champions)
3. (Japan) Shuko Aoyama / (China) Duan Yingying (semifinals)
4. (Switzerland) Viktorija Golubic / (Sweden) Johanna Larsson (first round)

== Draw ==
=== Key ===
- Q = Qualifier
- WC = Wild card
- LL = Lucky loser
- Alt = Alternate
- SE = Special exempt
- PR = Protected ranking
- ITF = ITF entry
- JE = Junior exempt
- w/o = Walkover
- r = Retired
- d = Defaulted
- SR = Special ranking

=== Draw ===
First round
1	(Japan) M Kato (Japan) M Ninomiya	6^{4}	6	[10]
(Australia) E Perez (Australia) Ar Rodionova	7^{7}	3	[6]
(Kazakhstan) Z Diyas (China) S Zheng	6	6
(Japan) N Hibino (Georgia (country)) O Kalashnikova	3	4
4	(Switzerland) V Golubic (Sweden) J Larsson	6	4	[6]
(Russia) V Savinykh (Spain) S Sorribes Tormo	3	6	[10]
(Japan) M Kobori (Japan) A Shimizu	6	5	[10]
WC	(Japan) M Imanishi (Poland) A Rosolska	3	7	[12]
(Slovenia) P Hercog (Slovenia) T Zidanšek	3	2
(United Kingdom) H Dart (Australia) P Hon	6	6
WC	(Japan) H Kuwata (Japan) C Muramatsu	2	4
3	(Japan) S Aoyama (China) Y Duan	6	6
(Montenegro) D Kovinić (Spain) S Soler Espinosa	3	2
(Australia) M Adamczak (Australia) J Moore	6	6
(China) X Han (Thailand) L Kumkhum	3	2
2	(Japan) E Hozumi (China) S Zhang	6	6

Quarterfinals
1	(Japan) M Kato (Japan) M Ninomiya	5	6	[10]
(Kazakhstan) Z Diyas (China) S Zheng	7	2	[5]
(Russia) V Savinykh (Spain) S Sorribes Tormo	6	6
WC	(Japan) M Imanishi (Poland) A Rosolska	3	3
(United Kingdom) H Dart (Australia) P Hon
3	(Japan) S Aoyama (China) Y Duan	w/o
(Australia) M Adamczak (Australia) J Moore	4	2
2	(Japan) E Hozumi (China) S Zhang	6	6

Semifinals
1	(Japan) M Kato (Japan) M Ninomiya	7^{7}	6
(Russia) V Savinykh (Spain) S Sorribes Tormo	6^{1}	4
3	(Japan) S Aoyama (China) Y Duan	1	4
2	(Japan) E Hozumi (China) S Zhang	6	6

Final
1	(Japan) M Kato (Japan) M Ninomiya	2	4
2	(Japan) E Hozumi (China) S Zhang	6	6
