= 2018 Ladies Open Lugano – Singles =

Singles
- 2018 Ladies Open Lugano

Final
- Champion: (Belgium) Elise Mertens
- Runner-up: (Belarus) Aryna Sabalenka
- Score: 7–5, 6–2

Events
Singles	Doubles
- Ladies Open Lugano

Elise Mertens defeated Aryna Sabalenka in the final, 7–5, 6–2, to win the singles title at the 2018 Ladies Open Lugano.

Markéta Vondroušová was the defending champion, but lost in the second round to Mertens.

== Seeds ==
1. (France) Kristina Mladenovic (first round, retired)
2. (Belgium) Elise Mertens (champion)
3. (Spain) Carla Suárez Navarro (withdrew)
4. (Estonia) Anett Kontaveit (first round)
5. (Russia) Svetlana Kuznetsova (first round)
6. (France) Alizé Cornet (second round)
7. (Romania) Mihaela Buzărnescu (first round)
8. (Belarus) Aliaksandra Sasnovich (second round)
9. (Belgium) Alison Van Uytvanck (second round)

== Draw ==
Key

- Q = Qualifier
- WC = Wild card
- LL = Lucky loser
- Alt = Alternate
- ITF = ITF entry
- PR = Protected ranking
- SR = Special ranking
- SE = Special exempt
- JE = Junior exempt
- JR = Junior Accelerator Programme entrant
- CO = College Accelerator Programme entrant
- NG = Next Gen Accelerator Program entrant
- w/o = Walkover
- r = Retired
- d = Defaulted

=== Finals ===
Semifinals
WC	(Switzerland) Stefanie Vögele	4	2
(Belarus) Aryna Sabalenka	6	6
Q	(Belarus) Vera Lapko	1	6	4
2	(Belgium) Elise Mertens	6	4	6

Final
(Belarus) Aryna Sabalenka	5	2
2	(Belgium) Elise Mertens	7	6

=== Top half ===
First round
1	(France) K Mladenovic	6^{5}	2^{r}
Q	(Germany) T Korpatsch	7^{7}	3
(Germany) L Siegemund	6^{5}	3^{r}
Q	(Liechtenstein) K von Deichmann	7^{7}	2
LL	(Poland) M Fręch	3	3
WC	(Switzerland) S Vögele	6	6
WC	(Switzerland) J Teichmann	6^{2}	0
6	(France) A Cornet	7^{7}	6
9	(Belgium) A Van Uytvanck	6	6
(France) O Dodin	4	2
(Czech Republic) Kr Plíšková	3	2
(Italy) C Giorgi	6	6
(Chinese Taipei) S-w Hsieh	5	0
(Slovenia) P Hercog	7	6
(Belarus) A Sabalenka	5	6	6
7	(Romania) M Buzărnescu	7	3	2

Second round
Q	(Germany) T Korpatsch	7^{7}	6
Q	(Liechtenstein) K von Deichmann	6^{2}	4
WC	(Switzerland) S Vögele	2	7	6
6	(France) A Cornet	6	5	3
9	(Belgium) A Van Uytvanck	2	1
(Italy) C Giorgi	6	6
(Slovenia) P Hercog	3	1
(Belarus) A Sabalenka	6	6

Quarterfinals
Q	(Germany) T Korpatsch	4	3
WC	(Switzerland) S Vögele	6	6
(Italy) C Giorgi	3	0
(Belarus) A Sabalenka	6	6

Semifinals
WC	(Switzerland) S Vögele	4	2
(Belarus) A Sabalenka	6	6

=== Bottom half ===
First round
8	(Belarus) A Sasnovich	7^{7}	6
Q	(Netherlands) R Hogenkamp	6^{4}	0
(Belgium) K Flipkens	1	6	6
(Germany) C Witthöft	6	4	3
Q	(Montenegro) D Kovinić	7^{8}	3	6
(Switzerland) V Golubic	6^{6}	6	4
Q	(Belarus) V Lapko	3	6	6
4	(Estonia) A Kontaveit	6	4	3
5/WC	(Russia) S Kuznetsova	6	3	4
(Germany) M Barthel	4	6	6
(Croatia) D Vekić	6	7
Q	(Romania) A Cadanțu	0	5
(Czech Republic) M Vondroušová	4	7^{7}	6
(Kazakhstan) Y Putintseva	6	6^{2}	3
PR	(Luxembourg) M Minella	4	1
2	(Belgium) E Mertens	6	6

Second round
8	(Belarus) A Sasnovich	6	4	2
(Belgium) K Flipkens	4	6	6
Q	(Montenegro) D Kovinić	2	3
Q	(Belarus) V Lapko	6	6
(Germany) M Barthel	6	4	6
(Croatia) D Vekić	3	6	4
(Czech Republic) M Vondroušová	2	7	5
2	(Belgium) E Mertens	6	5	7

Quarterfinals
(Belgium) K Flipkens	4	6^{4}
Q	(Belarus) V Lapko	6	7^{7}
(Germany) M Barthel	4	7	6^{0}
2	(Belgium) E Mertens	6	5	7^{7}

Semifinals
Q	(Belarus) V Lapko	1	6	4
2	(Belgium) E Mertens	6	4	6

== Qualifying ==
=== Seeds ===
1. (Netherlands) Richèl Hogenkamp (qualified)
2. (Netherlands) Arantxa Rus (qualifying competition)
3. (Montenegro) Danka Kovinić (qualified)
4. (Belarus) Vera Lapko (qualified)
5. (Poland) Magdalena Fręch (qualifying competition, lucky loser)
6. (Germany) Antonia Lottner (qualifying competition)
7. (Turkey) Çağla Büyükakçay (qualifying competition)
8. (Italy) Roberta Vinci (first round)
9. (Czech Republic) Marie Bouzková (qualifying competition)
10. (Romania) Alexandra Cadanțu (qualified)
11. (Germany) Tamara Korpatsch (qualified)
12. (Italy) Deborah Chiesa (first round)

=== Qualifiers ===
1. (Netherlands) Richèl Hogenkamp
2. (Romania) Alexandra Cadanțu
3. (Montenegro) Danka Kovinić
4. (Belarus) Vera Lapko
5. (Liechtenstein) Kathinka von Deichmann
6. (Germany) Tamara Korpatsch

=== Lucky loser ===
1. (Poland) Magdalena Fręch

=== Draw ===
==== First qualifier ====
First round
1	(Netherlands) Richèl Hogenkamp	6	6
PR	(Germany) Anne Schäfer	0	4
(Italy) Martina Trevisan	1	2
9	(Czech Republic) Marie Bouzková	6	6

Qualifying competition
1	(Netherlands) Richèl Hogenkamp	6	5	6
9	(Czech Republic) Marie Bouzková	3	7	4

==== Second qualifier ====
First round
2	(Netherlands) Arantxa Rus	6	6
PR	(Hungary) Réka Luca Jani	1	1
(Latvia) Diāna Marcinkēviča	3	2
10	(Romania) Alexandra Cadanțu	6	6

Qualifying competition
2	(Netherlands) Arantxa Rus	6	4	0
10	(Romania) Alexandra Cadanțu	2	6	6

==== Third qualifier ====
First round
3	(Montenegro) Danka Kovinić	6	6
WC	(Switzerland) Amra Sadiković	3	2
(Italy) Jessica Pieri	4	6	6
12	(Italy) Deborah Chiesa	6	2	4

Qualifying competition
3	(Montenegro) Danka Kovinić	6	6
(Italy) Jessica Pieri	1	2

==== Fourth qualifier ====
First round
4	(Belarus) Vera Lapko	6	6
WC	(Switzerland) Simona Waltert	2	0
WC	(Switzerland) Leonie Küng	6	1	1
7	(Turkey) Çağla Büyükakçay	2	6	6

Qualifying competition
4	(Belarus) Vera Lapko	6	6
7	(Turkey) Çağla Büyükakçay	2	4

==== Fifth qualifier ====
First round
5	(Poland) Magdalena Fręch	6	6
(France) Amandine Hesse	4	2
(Liechtenstein) Kathinka von Deichmann	6	6
8	(Italy) Roberta Vinci	1	3

Qualifying competition
5	(Poland) Magdalena Fręch	3	6	6^{5}
(Liechtenstein) Kathinka von Deichmann	6	1	7^{7}

==== Sixth qualifier ====
First round
6	(Germany) Antonia Lottner	4	7	6
(Russia) Veronika Kudermetova	6	5	4
WC	(Switzerland) Ylena In-Albon	1	5
11	(Germany) Tamara Korpatsch	6	7

Qualifying competition
6	(Germany) Antonia Lottner	1	6	1
11	(Germany) Tamara Korpatsch	6	4	6
