= 2018 Bucharest Open – Singles =

Singles
- 2018 Bucharest Open

Final
- Champion: (Latvia) Anastasija Sevastova
- Runner-up: (Croatia) Petra Martić
- Score: 7–6^{(7–4)}, 6–2

Details
- Draw: 32
- Seeds: 8

Events
Singles	Doubles
- Bucharest Open

Irina-Camelia Begu was the defending champion, but lost to Ons Jabeur in the first round.

Anastasija Sevastova won the title, defeating Petra Martić in the final, 7–6^{(7–4)}, 6–2.

== Seeds ==
1. (Latvia) Anastasija Sevastova (champion)
2. (Romania) Mihaela Buzărnescu (semifinals)
3. (Romania) Irina-Camelia Begu (first round)
4. (Croatia) Petra Martić (final)
5. (Romania) Sorana Cîrstea (quarterfinals)
6. (Romania) Ana Bogdan (first round)
7. (France) Pauline Parmentier (second round, retired)
8. (Slovenia) Polona Hercog (semifinals, retired)

== Draw ==
Key

- Q = Qualifier
- WC = Wild card
- LL = Lucky loser
- Alt = Alternate
- ITF = ITF entry
- PR = Protected ranking
- SR = Special ranking
- SE = Special exempt
- JE = Junior exempt
- JR = Junior Accelerator Programme entrant
- CO = College Accelerator Programme entrant
- NG = Next Gen Accelerator Program entrant
- w/o = Walkover
- r = Retired
- d = Defaulted

=== Finals ===
Semifinals
1	(Latvia) Anastasija Sevastova	6	0
8	(Slovenia) Polona Hercog	1	0^{r}
4	(Croatia) Petra Martić	6	6
2	(Romania) Mihaela Buzărnescu	4	4

Final
1	(Latvia) Anastasija Sevastova	7^{7}	6
4	(Croatia) Petra Martić	6^{4}	2

=== Top half ===
First round
1	(Latvia) A Sevastova	4	6	7^{7}
(Slovenia) D Jakupović	6	2	6^{1}
(Colombia) M Duque Mariño	2	4
(Netherlands) A Rus	6	6
(Belgium) Y Bonaventure	6^{5}	1
(Belgium) M Zanevska	7^{7}	6
Q	(Turkey) Ç Büyükakçay	3	3
5	(Romania) S Cîrstea	6	6
3	(Romania) I-C Begu	2	1
(Tunisia) O Jabeur	6	6
(Russia) V Zvonareva	6	6
(Russia) E Alexandrova	1	2
(Bulgaria) V Tomova	4	5
Q	(Romania) I Bara	6	7
WC	(Romania) E-G Ruse	6	2	3
8	(Slovenia) P Hercog	2	6	6

Second round
1	(Latvia) A Sevastova	6	7
(Netherlands) A Rus	1	5
(Belgium) M Zanevska	2	5
5	(Romania) S Cîrstea	6	7
(Tunisia) O Jabeur	6	6
(Russia) V Zvonareva	2	2
Q	(Romania) I Bara	5	2
8	(Slovenia) P Hercog	7	6

Quarterfinals
1	(Latvia) A Sevastova	3	6	6
5	(Romania) S Cîrstea	6	3	2
(Tunisia) O Jabeur	3	1
8	(Slovenia) P Hercog	6	6

Semifinals
1	(Latvia) A Sevastova	6	0
8	(Slovenia) P Hercog	1	0^{r}

=== Bottom half ===
First round
6	(Romania) A Bogdan	6	6^{4}	5
(Slovakia) AK Schmiedlová	4	7^{7}	7
PR	(Germany) L Siegemund	6	6
(Italy) J Paolini	4	0
Q	(United States) C Liu	4	6	6
WC	(Romania) A Roșca	6	3	4
Q	(Slovakia) R Šramková	2	4
4	(Croatia) P Martić	6	6
7	(France) P Parmentier	2	6	6
(Romania) A Dulgheru	6	1	4
WC	(Romania) M Bulgaru	1	3
(China) Y Wang	6	6
(Slovenia) T Zidanšek	7	6
(Sweden) R Peterson	5	0
(Montenegro) D Kovinić	2	4
2	(Romania) M Buzărnescu	6	6

Second round
(Slovakia) AK Schmiedlová	4	6	2
PR	(Germany) L Siegemund	6	3	6
Q	(United States) C Liu	2	7^{7}	4
4	(Croatia) P Martić	6	6^{5}	6
7	(France) P Parmentier	6^{0}	0^{r}
(China) Y Wang	7^{7}	3
(Slovenia) T Zidanšek	3	5
2	(Romania) M Buzărnescu	6	7

Quarterfinals
PR	(Germany) L Siegemund	5	6	4
4	(Croatia) P Martić	7	4	6
(China) Y Wang	6^{4}	3
2	(Romania) M Buzărnescu	7^{7}	6

Semifinals
4	(Croatia) P Martić	6	6
2	(Romania) M Buzărnescu	4	4

== Qualifying ==
=== Seeds ===
1. (Italy) Deborah Chiesa (first round)
2. (Romania) Irina Bara (qualified)
3. (Spain) Georgina García Pérez (qualifying competition)
4. (Spain) Paula Badosa Gibert (qualifying competition)
5. (Turkey) Çağla Büyükakçay (qualified)
6. (Serbia) Dejana Radanović (second round)
7. (Kazakhstan) Elena Rybakina (second round)
8. (Bulgaria) Sesil Karatantcheva (first round)

=== Qualifiers ===
1. (Slovakia) Rebecca Šramková
2. (Romania) Irina Bara
3. (Turkey) Çağla Büyükakçay
4. (United States) Claire Liu

=== Qualifying draw ===
==== First qualifier ====
First round
1	(Italy) Deborah Chiesa	2	1
WC	(Hungary) Anna Bondár	6	6
(Sweden) Cornelia Lister	3	4
(Romania) Jaqueline Cristian	6	6
(Slovakia) Rebecca Šramková	7^{7}	6
(Turkey) Başak Eraydın	6^{3}	3
PR	(Germany) Anne Schäfer	2	5
6	(Serbia) Dejana Radanović	6	7

Second round
WC	(Hungary) Anna Bondár	6	7^{7}
(Romania) Jaqueline Cristian	2	6^{4}
(Slovakia) Rebecca Šramková	6	6
6	(Serbia) Dejana Radanović	1	1

Qualifying competition
WC	(Hungary) Anna Bondár	6^{2}	4
(Slovakia) Rebecca Šramková	7^{7}	6

==== Second qualifier ====
First round
2	(Romania) Irina Bara	6	4	6
(Italy) Anastasia Grymalska	1	6	3
(Ukraine) Katarina Zavatska	7^{7}	6
(Russia) Polina Leykina	6^{4}	2
(Romania) Alexandra Cadanțu	6	6
WC	(Hungary) Panna Udvardy	0	0
(France) Marine Partaud	3	6	3
7	(Kazakhstan) Elena Rybakina	6	3	6

Second round
2	(Romania) Irina Bara	6	6
(Ukraine) Katarina Zavatska	2	2
(Romania) Alexandra Cadanțu	5	6	6
7	(Kazakhstan) Elena Rybakina	7	2	2

Qualifying competition
2	(Romania) Irina Bara	5	6	6
(Romania) Alexandra Cadanțu	7	2	2

==== Third qualifier ====
First round
3	(Spain) Georgina García Pérez	1	7	6
(Chile) Daniela Seguel	6	5	0
(Turkey) İpek Soylu	3	6^{5}
(Romania) Nicoleta Dascălu	6	7^{7}
WC	(Romania) Irina Fetecău	3	4
(Ukraine) Olga Ianchuk	6	6
(Hungary) Réka Luca Jani	4	4
5	(Turkey) Çağla Büyükakçay	6	6

Second round
3	(Spain) Georgina García Pérez	3	6	6
(Romania) Nicoleta Dascălu	6	4	2
(Ukraine) Olga Ianchuk	5	7	2
5	(Turkey) Çağla Büyükakçay	7	5	6

Qualifying competition
3	(Spain) Georgina García Pérez	3	6^{4}
5	(Turkey) Çağla Büyükakçay	6	7^{7}

==== Fourth qualifier ====
First round
4	(Spain) Paula Badosa Gibert	6	6
(Norway) Ulrikke Eikeri	0	3
(Romania) Cristina Dinu	4	6^{2}
(Slovakia) Chantal Škamlová	6	7^{7}
(United States) Claire Liu	6	3	6
(Japan) Mari Osaka	0	6	4
WC	(Romania) Andreea Prisăcariu	6	6
8	(Bulgaria) Sesil Karatantcheva	4	3

Second round
4	(Spain) Paula Badosa Gibert	6	6
(Slovakia) Chantal Škamlová	0	1
(United States) Claire Liu	6	6
WC	(Romania) Andreea Prisăcariu	3	1

Qualifying competition
4	(Spain) Paula Badosa Gibert	3	6	4
(United States) Claire Liu	6	4	6
