= 2018 Tianjin Open – Doubles =

Doubles
- 2018 Tianjin Open

Final
- Champions: (United States) Nicole Melichar (Czech Republic) Květa Peschke
- Runners-up: (Australia) Monique Adamczak (Australia) Jessica Moore
- Score: 6–4, 6–2

Details
- Draw: 16
- Seeds: 4

Events
Singles	Doubles
- Tianjin Open

Irina-Camelia Begu and Sara Errani were the defending champions, but Errani is serving a doping suspension. Begu played alongside Barbora Krejčíková, but they lost in the quarterfinals to Han Xinyun and Darija Jurak.

Nicole Melichar and Květa Peschke won the title, defeating Monique Adamczak and Jessica Moore in the final, 6–4, 6–2.

== Seeds ==
1. (Romania) Irina-Camelia Begu / (Czech Republic) Barbora Krejčíková (quarterfinals)
2. (Canada) Gabriela Dabrowski / (China) Xu Yifan (withdrew)
3. (United States) Nicole Melichar / (Czech Republic) Květa Peschke (champions)
4. (United States) Kaitlyn Christian / (United States) Desirae Krawczyk (first round)

== Draw ==
Key

- Q = Qualifier
- WC = Wild card
- LL = Lucky loser
- Alt = Alternate
- ITF = ITF entry
- PR = Protected ranking
- SR = Special ranking
- SE = Special exempt
- JE = Junior exempt
- JR = Junior Accelerator Programme entrant
- CO = College Accelerator Programme entrant
- NG = Next Gen Accelerator Program entrant
- w/o = Walkover
- r = Retired
- d = Defaulted

=== Draw ===
First round
1	(Romania) I-C Begu (Czech Republic) B Krejčíková	6	6
WC	(China) Y Liu (China) M Wang	2	0
(United States) S Santamaria (Russia) Y Sizikova	2	1
(China) X Han (Croatia) D Jurak	6	6
4	(United States) K Christian (United States) D Krawczyk	2	6	[4]
(Spain) L Arruabarrena (Switzerland) T Bacsinszky	6	4	[10]
(Australia) M Adamczak (Australia) J Moore	6	1	[10]
(China) Y Duan (China) Y Wang	4	6	[8]
(Japan) M Doi (Netherlands) E Wacanno	6	6
(China) X Jiang (China) Q Tang	4	4
(Russia) E Rodina (Australia) A Tomljanović	3	6	[6]
3	(United States) N Melichar (Czech Republic) K Peschke	6	4	[10]
WC	(China) H Guo (China) L Zhu	5	3
(United States) J Cako (India) P Thombare	7	6
(Russia) N Dzalamidze (Russia) V Kudermetova	7^{7}	1	[10]
Alt	(India) A Raina (United Kingdom) E Webley-Smith	6^{4}	6	[5]

Quarterfinals
1	(Romania) I-C Begu (Czech Republic) B Krejčíková	4	6	[8]
(China) X Han (Croatia) D Jurak	6	4	[10]
(Spain) L Arruabarrena (Switzerland) T Bacsinszky	6^{3}	1^{r}
(Australia) M Adamczak (Australia) J Moore	7^{7}	2
(Japan) M Doi (Netherlands) E Wacanno	3	5
3	(United States) N Melichar (Czech Republic) K Peschke	6	7
(United States) J Cako (India) P Thombare	4	4
(Russia) N Dzalamidze (Russia) V Kudermetova	6	6

Semifinals
(China) X Han (Croatia) D Jurak	4	6	[5]
(Australia) M Adamczak (Australia) J Moore	6	1	[10]
3	(United States) N Melichar (Czech Republic) K Peschke	4	6	[10]
(Russia) N Dzalamidze (Russia) V Kudermetova	6	3	[6]

Final
(Australia) M Adamczak (Australia) J Moore	4	2
3	(United States) N Melichar (Czech Republic) K Peschke	6	6
