= 2018 Bucharest Open – Doubles =

Doubles
- 2018 Bucharest Open

Final
- Champions: (Romania) Irina-Camelia Begu (Romania) Andreea Mitu
- Runners-up: (Montenegro) Danka Kovinić (Belgium) Maryna Zanevska
- Score: 6–3, 6–4

Details
- Draw: 16
- Seeds: 4

Events
Singles	Doubles
- Bucharest Open

Irina-Camelia Begu and Raluca Olaru were the defending champions, but chose not to participate together. Olaru played alongside Mihaela Buzărnescu, but lost in the semifinals to Danka Kovinić and Maryna Zanevska. Begu teamed up with Andreea Mitu and successfully defended the title, defeating Kovinić and Zanevska in the final, 6–3, 6–4.

== Seeds ==
1. (Romania) Mihaela Buzărnescu / (Romania) Raluca Olaru (semifinals)
2. (Australia) Monique Adamczak / (Australia) Jessica Moore (quarterfinals)
3. (Romania) Irina Bara / (Germany) Nicola Geuer (quarterfinals)
4. (Belarus) Lidziya Marozava / (Netherlands) Arantxa Rus (first round)

== Draw ==
Key

- Q = Qualifier
- WC = Wild card
- LL = Lucky loser
- Alt = Alternate
- ITF = ITF entry
- PR = Protected ranking
- SR = Special ranking
- SE = Special exempt
- JE = Junior exempt
- JR = Junior Accelerator Programme entrant
- CO = College Accelerator Programme entrant
- NG = Next Gen Accelerator Program entrant
- w/o = Walkover
- r = Retired
- d = Defaulted

=== Draw ===
First round
1	(Romania) M Buzărnescu (Romania) R Olaru	6	6
(Russia) A Fomina (Kazakhstan) E Rybakina	4	2
(Spain) G García Pérez (Sweden) C Lister	7	4	[10]
(Russia) N Dzalamidze (Turkey) İ Soylu	5	6	[6]
3	(Romania) I Bara (Germany) N Geuer	6	6
(Norway) U Eikeri (Russia) P Leykina	3	4
(Belgium) Y Bonaventure (Georgia (country)) O Kalashnikova	4	2
(Montenegro) D Kovinić (Belgium) M Zanevska	6	6
(Hungary) RL Jani (Slovakia) C Škamlová	2	4
WC	(Romania) I-C Begu (Romania) A Mitu	6	6
(Romania) A Cadanțu (Argentina) M Irigoyen	3	3
4	(Belarus) L Marozava (Netherlands) A Rus	6	6
(Turkey) B Eraydın (Russia) V Zvonareva	4	1
(Romania) J Cristian (Romania) E-G Ruse	6	6
WC	(Hungary) A Bondár (Romania) M Bulgaru	4	7	[6]
2	(Australia) M Adamczak (Australia) J Moore	6	5	[10]

Quarterfinals
1	(Romania) M Buzărnescu (Romania) R Olaru	6	6
(Spain) G García Pérez (Sweden) C Lister	2	4
3	(Romania) I Bara (Germany) N Geuer	1	2
(Montenegro) D Kovinić (Belgium) M Zanevska	6	6
WC	(Romania) I-C Begu (Romania) A Mitu	7	6
4	(Belarus) L Marozava (Netherlands) A Rus	5	2
(Romania) J Cristian (Romania) E-G Ruse	7^{7}	3	[10]
2	(Australia) M Adamczak (Australia) J Moore	6^{3}	6	[4]

Semifinals
1	(Romania) M Buzărnescu (Romania) R Olaru	4	1
(Montenegro) D Kovinić (Belgium) M Zanevska	6	6
WC	(Romania) I-C Begu (Romania) A Mitu	6	3	[10]
(Romania) J Cristian (Romania) E-G Ruse	4	6	[6]

Final
(Montenegro) D Kovinić (Belgium) M Zanevska	3	4
WC	(Romania) I-C Begu (Romania) A Mitu	6	6
