= 2018 Tianjin Open – Singles =

Singles
- 2018 Tianjin Open

Final
- Champion: (France) Caroline Garcia
- Runner-up: (Czech Republic) Karolína Plíšková
- Score: 7–6^{(9–7)}, 6–3

Details
- Draw: 32
- Seeds: 8

Events
Singles	Doubles
- Tianjin Open

Maria Sharapova was the defending champion, but withdrew due to a shoulder injury.

Caroline Garcia won the title, defeating Karolína Plíšková in the final, 7–6^{(9–7)}, 6–3.

== Seeds ==
1. (Czech Republic) Karolína Plíšková (final)
2. (France) Caroline Garcia (champion)
3. (Belgium) Elise Mertens (quarterfinals, retired)
4. (Belarus) Aryna Sabalenka (quarterfinals)
5. (Chinese Taipei) Hsieh Su-wei (semifinals)
6. (Croatia) Petra Martić (quarterfinals, retired)
7. (United States) Danielle Collins (first round, retired)
8. (Greece) Maria Sakkari (first round)

== Draw ==
Key

- Q = Qualifier
- WC = Wild card
- LL = Lucky loser
- Alt = Alternate
- ITF = ITF entry
- PR = Protected ranking
- SR = Special ranking
- SE = Special exempt
- JE = Junior exempt
- JR = Junior Accelerator Programme entrant
- CO = College Accelerator Programme entrant
- NG = Next Gen Accelerator Program entrant
- w/o = Walkover
- r = Retired
- d = Defaulted

=== Finals ===
Semifinals
1/WC	(Czech Republic) Karolína Plíšková	6	6
PR	(Switzerland) Timea Bacsinszky	2	1
5	(Chinese Taipei) Hsieh Su-wei	3	4
2	(France) Caroline Garcia	6	6

Final
1/WC	(Czech Republic) Karolína Plíšková	6^{7}	3
2	(France) Caroline Garcia	7^{9}	6

=== Top half ===
First round
1/WC	(Czech Republic) Ka Plíšková	6	6^{3}	6
(United States) V Lepchenko	2	7^{7}	3
(Spain) L Arruabarrena	6^{5}	2
(Slovenia) P Hercog	7^{7}	6
(Ukraine) K Kozlova	1^{r}
Q	(Czech Republic) B Krejčíková	4
(United Kingdom) K Boulter	7^{7}	6
8	(Greece) M Sakkari	6^{4}	3
4	(Belarus) A Sabalenka	7^{7}	4	6
(United States) S Kenin	6^{4}	6	0
(Poland) M Linette	2	6	6
(Russia) E Rodina	6	1	4
(Kazakhstan) Y Putintseva	0	6	6^{6}
Q	(Japan) M Doi	6	3	7^{8}
PR	(Switzerland) T Bacsinszky	6	0
7	(United States) D Collins	3	0^{r}

Second round
1/WC	(Czech Republic) Ka Plíšková	6	6
(Slovenia) P Hercog	1	2
Q	(Czech Republic) B Krejčíková	3	6	3
(United Kingdom) K Boulter	6	1	6
4	(Belarus) A Sabalenka	6	6
(Poland) M Linette	1	3
Q	(Japan) M Doi	6	3	5
PR	(Switzerland) T Bacsinszky	1	6	7

Quarterfinals
1/WC	(Czech Republic) Ka Plíšková	5	6	6
(United Kingdom) K Boulter	7	0	3
4	(Belarus) A Sabalenka	6^{2}	6^{5}
PR	(Switzerland) T Bacsinszky	7^{7}	7^{7}

Semifinals
1/WC	(Czech Republic) Ka Plíšková	6	6
PR	(Switzerland) T Bacsinszky	2	1

=== Bottom half ===
First round
5	(Chinese Taipei) S-w Hsieh	7^{7}	7
(Australia) A Tomljanović	6^{5}	5
Q	(Russia) V Kudermetova	5	6	7
(United States) A Riske	7	1	5
Q	(Slovakia) J Čepelová	7	3	6
(China) Y Wang	5	6	4
(China) L Zhu	5	1
3	(Belgium) E Mertens	7	6
6	(Croatia) P Martić	3	6	7^{7}
(China) Y Duan	6	3	6^{3}
WC	(China) Y Yuan	0	6	4
WC	(China) F Liu	6	1	6
Q	(China) Y Zhang	7	6
(Romania) I-C Begu	5	3
Q	(China) F Xun	4	1
2	(France) C Garcia	6	6

Second round
5	(Chinese Taipei) S-w Hsieh	6	2	6
Q	(Russia) V Kudermetova	2	6	2
Q	(Slovakia) J Čepelová	2	3
3	(Belgium) E Mertens	6	6
6	(Croatia) P Martić	1	6	6
WC	(China) F Liu	6	0	1
Q	(China) Y Zhang	3	4
2	(France) C Garcia	6	6

Quarterfinals
5	(Chinese Taipei) S-w Hsieh	6	4
3	(Belgium) E Mertens	2	0^{r}
6	(Croatia) P Martić	2	0^{r}
2	(France) C Garcia	6	1

Semifinals
5	(Chinese Taipei) S-w Hsieh	3	4
2	(France) C Garcia	6	6

== Qualifying ==
=== Seeds ===
1. (Russia) Veronika Kudermetova (qualified)
2. (Japan) Misaki Doi (qualified)
3. (China) Han Xinyun (qualifying competition)
4. (India) Ankita Raina (qualifying competition)
5. (Germany) Sabine Lisicki (qualifying competition)
6. (China) Xun Fangying (qualified)
7. (China) Zhang Yuxuan (qualified)
8. (Czech Republic) Barbora Krejčíková (qualified)
9. (Japan) Hiroko Kuwata (qualifying competition)
10. (Slovakia) Jana Čepelová (qualified)
11. (China) Zhang Kailin (qualifying competition)
12. (Slovakia) Michaela Hončová (first round)

=== Qualifiers ===
1. (Russia) Veronika Kudermetova
2. (Japan) Misaki Doi
3. (Slovakia) Jana Čepelová
4. (China) Zhang Yuxuan
5. (Czech Republic) Barbora Krejčíková
6. (China) Xun Fangying

=== Draw ===
==== First qualifier ====
First round
1	(Russia) Veronika Kudermetova	6	6
WC	(China) Wang Meiling	2	4
(Russia) Yana Sizikova	6	6
12	(Slovakia) Michaela Hončová	4	2

Qualifying competition
1	(Russia) Veronika Kudermetova	3	7^{9}	4
(Russia) Yana Sizikova	6	6^{7}	1^{r}

==== Second qualifier ====
First round
2	(Japan) Misaki Doi	7^{7}	6
(United States) Sabrina Santamaria	6^{5}	4
(China) Kang Jiaqi	7^{9}	0	5
11	(China) Zhang Kailin	6^{7}	6	7

Qualifying competition
2	(Japan) Misaki Doi	6	6
11	(China) Zhang Kailin	2	0

==== Third qualifier ====
First round
3	(China) Han Xinyun	6	6
(United States) Jacqueline Cako	4	2
(China) Guo Hanyu	0	1
10	(Slovakia) Jana Čepelová	6	6

Qualifying competition
3	(China) Han Xinyun	5	0
10	(Slovakia) Jana Čepelová	7	6

==== Fourth qualifier ====
First round
4	(India) Ankita Raina	6	7
WC	(China) Zhang Ying	4	5
(China) You Xiaodi	6	2	4
7	(China) Zhang Yuxuan	4	6	6

Qualifying competition
4	(India) Ankita Raina	7	0	3
7	(China) Zhang Yuxuan	5	6	6

==== Fifth qualifier ====
First round
5	(Germany) Sabine Lisicki	6	6
PR	(Serbia) Bojana Jovanovski Petrović	2	1
WC	(China) Liu Yanni	1	0
8	(Czech Republic) Barbora Krejčíková	6	6

Qualifying competition
5	(Germany) Sabine Lisicki	6^{7}	7	3
8	(Czech Republic) Barbora Krejčíková	7^{9}	5	6

==== Sixth qualifier ====
First round
6	(China) Xun Fangying	6	7^{7}
WC	(China) Liu Chang	4	6^{3}
(United Kingdom) Emily Webley-Smith	3	3
9	(Japan) Hiroko Kuwata	6	6

Qualifying competition
6	(China) Xun Fangying	6	3	6
9	(Japan) Hiroko Kuwata	2	6	4
