= 2018 Ladies Open Lugano – Doubles =

Doubles
- 2018 Ladies Open Lugano

Final
- Champions: (Belgium) Kirsten Flipkens (Belgium) Elise Mertens
- Runners-up: (Belarus) Vera Lapko (Belarus) Aryna Sabalenka
- Score: 6–1, 6–3

Events
| Singles | Doubles |
| ← 2017 · | Ladies Open Lugano | · 2019 → |

Hsieh Su-wei and Monica Niculescu were the defending champions, but chose not to participate this year.

Kirsten Flipkens and Elise Mertens won the title, defeating Vera Lapko and Aryna Sabalenka in the final, 6–1, 6–3.

== Seeds ==
1. (Belgium) Kirsten Flipkens / (Belgium) Elise Mertens (champions)
2. (Poland) Alicja Rosolska / (United States) Abigail Spears (semifinals)
3. (Romania) Raluca Olaru / (United Kingdom) Anna Smith (quarterfinals)
4. (Australia) Monique Adamczak / (Switzerland) Xenia Knoll (quarterfinals)

== Draw ==
=== Key ===
- Q = Qualifier
- WC = Wild card
- LL = Lucky loser
- Alt = Alternate
- SE = Special exempt
- PR = Protected ranking
- ITF = ITF entry
- JE = Junior exempt
- w/o = Walkover
- r = Retired
- d = Defaulted
- SR = Special ranking

=== Draw ===
First round
1 | (Belgium) K Flipkens (Belgium) E Mertens | 6 | 4 | [10]
(Russia) N Dzalamidze (Russia) V Kudermetova | 4 | 6 | [1]
(Switzerland) V Golubic (Switzerland) J Teichmann | 6 | 6
(Georgia (country)) O Kalashnikova (Netherlands) A Rus | 4 | 2
3 | (Romania) R Olaru (United Kingdom) A Smith | 6 | 6
(Croatia) D Jurak (Australia) J Moore | 2 | 2
PR | (Czech Republic) Kr Plíšková (Kazakhstan) G Voskoboeva | 7 | 6
Alt | (Hungary) RL Jani (Montenegro) D Kovinić | 5 | 1
(Belarus) V Lapko (Belarus) A Sabalenka | 6 | 6
(Germany) M Barthel (Germany) C Witthöft | 3 | 2
(Romania) M Buzărnescu (Belarus) A Sasnovich | 6 | 3 | [7]
4 | (Australia) M Adamczak (Switzerland) X Knoll | 1 | 6 | [10]
(Germany) N Geuer (Netherlands) E Wacanno | 7 | 6
(Czech Republic) M Vondroušová (Czech Republic) R Voráčová | 5 | 4
PR | (Luxembourg) M Minella (Belgium) A Van Uytvanck | 3 | 6^{2}
2 | (Poland) A Rosolska (United States) A Spears | 6 | 7^{7}

Quarterfinals
1 | (Belgium) K Flipkens (Belgium) E Mertens | 6 | 6
(Switzerland) V Golubic (Switzerland) J Teichmann | 3 | 4
3 | (Romania) R Olaru (United Kingdom) A Smith | 5 | 4
PR | (Czech Republic) Kr Plíšková (Kazakhstan) G Voskoboeva | 7 | 6
(Belarus) V Lapko (Belarus) A Sabalenka | 6 | 6
4 | (Australia) M Adamczak (Switzerland) X Knoll | 4 | 3
(Germany) N Geuer (Netherlands) E Wacanno | 5 | 6 | [2]
2 | (Poland) A Rosolska (United States) A Spears | 7 | 4 | [10]

Semifinals
1 | (Belgium) K Flipkens (Belgium) E Mertens | 6 | 7
PR | (Czech Republic) Kr Plíšková (Kazakhstan) G Voskoboeva | 3 | 5
(Belarus) V Lapko (Belarus) A Sabalenka | 6 | 3 | [10]
2 | (Poland) A Rosolska (United States) A Spears | 2 | 6 | [7]

Final
1 | (Belgium) K Flipkens (Belgium) E Mertens | 6 | 6
(Belarus) V Lapko (Belarus) A Sabalenka | 1 | 3
