= 2018 Connecticut Open – Singles =

Women's tennis tournament

Singles
- 2018 Connecticut Open

Final
- Champion: (Belarus) Aryna Sabalenka
- Runner-up: (Spain) Carla Suárez Navarro
- Score: 6–1, 6–4

Details
- Draw: 30

Events
Singles	Doubles
- Connecticut Open

Daria Gavrilova was the defending champion, but lost to Aryna Sabalenka in the second round.

Sabalenka went on to win her first WTA Tour title, defeating Carla Suárez Navarro in the final, 6–1, 6–4. Suárez Navarro reached the final having played only one completed match in the first four rounds due to two of her opponent's retiring mid-match because of injuries and another withdrawing from the tournament due to illness.

== Seeds ==
The top two seeds received byes into the second round.

1. (Romania) Simona Halep (withdrew)
2. (France) Caroline Garcia (quarterfinals)
3. (Czech Republic) Petra Kvitová (quarterfinals, retired)
4. (Czech Republic) Karolína Plíšková (first round)
5. (Germany) Julia Görges (semifinals)
6. (Australia) Ashleigh Barty (withdrew)
7. (Netherlands) Kiki Bertens (withdrew)
8. (Czech Republic) Barbora Strýcová (first round)
9. (Australia) Daria Gavrilova (second round)

== Draw ==
Key

- Q = Qualifier
- WC = Wild card
- LL = Lucky loser
- Alt = Alternate
- ITF = ITF entry
- PR = Protected ranking
- SR = Special ranking
- SE = Special exempt
- JE = Junior exempt
- JR = Junior Accelerator Programme entrant
- CO = College Accelerator Programme entrant
- NG = Next Gen Accelerator Program entrant
- w/o = Walkover
- r = Retired
- d = Defaulted

=== Finals ===
Semifinals
(Belarus) Aryna Sabalenka	6	7^{7}
5	(Germany) Julia Görges	4	6^{3}
(Spain) Carla Suárez Navarro	4
Q	(Puerto Rico) Monica Puig	4^{r}

Final
(Belarus) Aryna Sabalenka	6	6
(Spain) Carla Suárez Navarro	1	4

=== Top half ===
First round
Q	(Romania) A Bogdan	3	2
Q	(Italy) C Giorgi	6	6
LL	(Australia) S Stosur	3	2
(Belarus) A Sabalenka	6	6
(Romania) I-C Begu	2	1
9	(Australia) D Gavrilova	6	6
4/WC	(Czech Republic) Ka Plíšková	1	3
(Russia) E Makarova	6	6
(Slovakia) M Rybáriková	2	6	2
WC	(United States) C Vandeweghe	6	4	3^{r}
Q	(Ukraine) D Yastremska	6	6
WC	(United States) D Collins	0	3
(Slovakia) D Cibulková	3	1
5	(Germany) J Görges	6	6

Second round
LL	(Switzerland) B Bencic	6	6
Q	(Italy) C Giorgi	4	4
(Belarus) A Sabalenka	6	6^{6}	7
9	(Australia) D Gavrilova	3	7^{8}	5
(Russia) E Makarova	2	6	6
(Slovakia) M Rybáriková	6	3	3
Q	(Ukraine) D Yastremska	4	6	4
5	(Germany) J Görges	6	3	6

Quarterfinals
LL	(Switzerland) B Bencic	3	2
(Belarus) A Sabalenka	6	6
(Russia) E Makarova	4	2
5	(Germany) J Görges	6	6

Semifinals
(Belarus) A Sabalenka	6	7^{7}
5	(Germany) J Görges	4	6^{3}

=== Bottom half ===
First round
8	(Czech Republic) B Strýcová	6^{6}	4
(Spain) C Suárez Navarro	7^{8}	6
PR	(Germany) L Siegemund	2	5
(United Kingdom) J Konta	6	7
(Greece) M Sakkari	4	3
Q	(Kazakhstan) Z Diyas	6	6
(Poland) A Radwańska	1	6^{3}
3	(Czech Republic) P Kvitová	6	7^{7}
LL	(France) P Parmentier	6	2	2
(Estonia) A Kontaveit	3	6	6
Q	(Puerto Rico) M Puig	7	6
PR	(Switzerland) T Bacsinszky	5	1
Q	(Belarus) A Sasnovich	7^{8}	6^{3}	6
(France) K Mladenovic	6^{6}	7^{7}	2

Second round
(Spain) C Suárez Navarro	w/o
(United Kingdom) J Konta
Q	(Kazakhstan) Z Diyas	1	7	2
3	(Czech Republic) P Kvitová	6	5	6
(Estonia) A Kontaveit	4	3
Q	(Puerto Rico) M Puig	6	6
Q	(Belarus) A Sasnovich	7^{7}	2	4
2	(France) C Garcia	6^{2}	6	6

Quarterfinals
(Spain) C Suárez Navarro	6	0
3	(Czech Republic) P Kvitová	3	0^{r}
Q	(Puerto Rico) M Puig	7	1	6
2	(France) C Garcia	5	6	2

Semifinals
(Spain) C Suárez Navarro	4
Q	(Puerto Rico) M Puig	4^{r}

== Qualifying ==
=== Seeds ===
1. (Belarus) Aliaksandra Sasnovich (qualified)
2. (Belgium) Alison Van Uytvanck (first round)
3. (Italy) Camila Giorgi (qualified)
4. (Chinese Taipei) Hsieh Su-wei (second round)
5. (Switzerland) Belinda Bencic (qualifying competition, lucky loser)
6. (Belgium) Kirsten Flipkens (second round)
7. (Kazakhstan) Yulia Putintseva (first round)
8. (Croatia) Petra Martić (first round, retired)
9. (Czech Republic) Kateřina Siniaková (withdrew, still competing in Cincinnati)
10. (Slovakia) Viktória Kužmová (first round)
11. (Poland) Magda Linette (second round)
12. (Romania) Monica Niculescu (first round)

=== Qualifiers ===
1. (Belarus) Aliaksandra Sasnovich
2. (Romania) Ana Bogdan
3. (Italy) Camila Giorgi
4. (Puerto Rico) Monica Puig
5. (Ukraine) Dayana Yastremska
6. (Kazakhstan) Zarina Diyas

=== Lucky losers ===
1. (Australia) Samantha Stosur
2. (Switzerland) Belinda Bencic
3. (France) Pauline Parmentier

=== Draw ===
==== First qualifier ====
First round
1	(Belarus) Aliaksandra Sasnovich	7^{8}	6
(Sweden) Johanna Larsson	6^{6}	3
(Czech Republic) Kristýna Plíšková	6	6
WC	(United States) Maria Mateas	1	2
(France) Pauline Parmentier	7	6
(Russia) Evgeniya Rodina	5	2
(Germany) Carina Witthöft	4	4
8	(Croatia) Petra Martić	6	1^{r}

Second round
1	(Belarus) Aliaksandra Sasnovich	6	1	6
(Czech Republic) Kristýna Plíšková	1	6	1
(France) Pauline Parmentier	7	6
(Germany) Carina Witthöft	5	2

Qualifying competition
1	(Belarus) Aliaksandra Sasnovich	6	6
(France) Pauline Parmentier	1	4

==== Second qualifier ====
First round
2	(Belgium) Alison Van Uytvanck	3	6	4
(Sweden) Rebecca Peterson	6	1	6
(United States) Sofia Kenin	7^{7}	6
(Slovakia) Anna Karolína Schmiedlová	6^{5}	4
WC	(United States) Caroline Dunleavy	2	0
(Russia) Anna Blinkova	6	6
(Romania) Ana Bogdan	6	6
10	(Slovakia) Viktória Kužmová	2	2

Second round
(Sweden) Rebecca Peterson	5	7	6
(United States) Sofia Kenin	7	5	3
(Russia) Anna Blinkova	3	0
(Romania) Ana Bogdan	6	6

Qualifying competition
(Sweden) Rebecca Peterson	6^{2}	3
(Romania) Ana Bogdan	7^{7}	6

==== Third qualifier ====
First round
3	(Italy) Camila Giorgi	1	6	6
(United States) Claire Liu	6	3	2
Alt	(Australia) Ellen Perez	7^{7}	6
(Czech Republic) Markéta Vondroušová	6^{2}	4
(Australia) Samantha Stosur	6	6
(United States) Christina McHale	3	2
(Switzerland) Stefanie Vögele	6	7
Alt	(Russia) Valeria Savinykh	3	5

Second round
3	(Italy) Camila Giorgi	w/o
Alt	(Australia) Ellen Perez
(Australia) Samantha Stosur	6	0
(Switzerland) Stefanie Vögele	3	0^{r}

Qualifying competition
3	(Italy) Camila Giorgi	7	6
(Australia) Samantha Stosur	5	3

==== Fourth qualifier ====
First round
4	(Chinese Taipei) Hsieh Su-wei	6	6
(Spain) Sara Sorribes Tormo	4	2
PR	(Russia) Margarita Gasparyan	6	6
(Slovenia) Polona Hercog	2	4
(Germany) Andrea Petkovic	6	6
(Spain) Lara Arruabarrena	1	2
(Puerto Rico) Monica Puig	7^{7}	6
12	(Romania) Monica Niculescu	6^{5}	3

Second round
4	(Chinese Taipei) Hsieh Su-wei	6	6^{8}	3
PR	(Russia) Margarita Gasparyan	4	7^{10}	6
(Germany) Andrea Petkovic	6^{4}	1^{r}
(Puerto Rico) Monica Puig	7^{7}	1

Qualifying competition
PR	(Russia) Margarita Gasparyan	7	2	2
(Puerto Rico) Monica Puig	5	6	6

==== Fifth qualifier ====
First round
5	(Switzerland) Belinda Bencic	2	6	6
(Japan) Kurumi Nara	6	4	3
WC	(United States) Whitney Osuigwe	6	6
WC	(United States) Asia Muhammad	3	3
(Ukraine) Dayana Yastremska	6	1	6
WC	(United States) Bernarda Pera	3	6	4
(United States) Sachia Vickery	4	6	0
11	(Poland) Magda Linette	6	3	6

Second round
5	(Switzerland) Belinda Bencic	6^{5}	6	6
WC	(United States) Whitney Osuigwe	7^{7}	2	2
(Ukraine) Dayana Yastremska	7^{7}	7^{7}
11	(Poland) Magda Linette	6^{3}	6^{4}

Qualifying competition
5	(Switzerland) Belinda Bencic	6^{5}	6^{3}
(Ukraine) Dayana Yastremska	7^{7}	7^{7}

==== Sixth qualifier ====
First round
6	(Belgium) Kirsten Flipkens	6	6
WC	(United States) Emma Davis	3	1
(Slovenia) Tamara Zidanšek	7	7^{7}
(United States) Maria Sanchez	5	6^{5}
(Belarus) Vera Lapko	6	6
(United States) Emina Bektas	4	1
(Kazakhstan) Zarina Diyas	7	6
7	(Kazakhstan) Yulia Putintseva	5	1

Second round
6	(Belgium) Kirsten Flipkens	3	2
(Slovenia) Tamara Zidanšek	6	6
(Belarus) Vera Lapko	1	6	3
(Kazakhstan) Zarina Diyas	6	3	6

Qualifying competition
(Slovenia) Tamara Zidanšek	1	4
(Kazakhstan) Zarina Diyas	6	6
