= 2018 Japan Women's Open – Singles =

Singles
- 2018 Japan Women's Open

Final
- Champion: (Chinese Taipei) Hsieh Su-wei
- Runner-up: (United States) Amanda Anisimova
- Score: 6–2, 6–2

Events
Singles	Doubles
- Japan Women's Open

Zarina Diyas was the defending champion, but lost in the quarterfinals to Zhang Shuai.

Hsieh Su-wei won her first title in six years, beating Amanda Anisimova in the final 6–2, 6–2.

== Seeds ==
1. (China) Zhang Shuai (semifinals)
2. (Chinese Taipei) Hsieh Su-wei (champion)
3. (Kazakhstan) Yulia Putintseva (first round, retired)
4. (China) Wang Qiang (semifinals)
5. (Australia) Ajla Tomljanović (quarterfinals)
6. (Kazakhstan) Zarina Diyas (quarterfinals)
7. (China) Zheng Saisai (second round)
8. (Poland) Magda Linette (quarterfinals)

== Draw ==
Key

- Q = Qualifier
- WC = Wild card
- LL = Lucky loser
- Alt = Alternate
- ITF = ITF entry
- PR = Protected ranking
- SR = Special ranking
- SE = Special exempt
- JE = Junior exempt
- JR = Junior Accelerator Programme entrant
- CO = College Accelerator Programme entrant
- NG = Next Gen Accelerator Program entrant
- w/o = Walkover
- r = Retired
- d = Defaulted

=== Finals ===
Semifinals
1	(China) Zhang Shuai	6^{4}	5
Q	(United States) Amanda Anisimova	7^{7}	7
4	(China) Wang Qiang	4	4
2	(Chinese Taipei) Hsieh Su-wei	6	6

Final
Q	(United States) Amanda Anisimova	2	2
2	(Chinese Taipei) Hsieh Su-wei	6	6

=== Top half ===
First round
1	(China) S Zhang	7	6
(Poland) M Fręch	5	3
WC	(Japan) N Hibino	6	6
(Canada) E Bouchard	4	4
(Ukraine) K Kozlova	6	6
Q	(China) Y Zhang	2	3
(Spain) S Sorribes Tormo	2	1
6	(Kazakhstan) Z Diyas	6	6
3	(Kazakhstan) Y Putintseva	2	0^{r}
(Slovakia) AK Schmiedlová	6	0
(Switzerland) V Golubic	0	6	7^{7}
WC	(Japan) M Doi	6	3	6^{1}
(Croatia) J Fett	1	1
Q	(United States) A Anisimova	6	6
(United States) A Riske	5	4
7	(China) S Zheng	7	6

Second round
1	(China) S Zhang	6	7^{7}
WC	(Japan) N Hibino	4	6^{4}
(Ukraine) K Kozlova	7^{7}	2	5
6	(Kazakhstan) Z Diyas	6^{3}	6	7
(Slovakia) AK Schmiedlová	5	7	6
(Switzerland) V Golubic	7	5	3
Q	(United States) A Anisimova	6	6
7	(China) S Zheng	1	1

Quarterfinals
1	(China) S Zhang	6	7
6	(Kazakhstan) Z Diyas	4	5
(Slovakia) AK Schmiedlová	3	1
Q	(United States) A Anisimova	6	6

Semifinals
1	(China) S Zhang	6^{4}	5
Q	(United States) A Anisimova	7^{7}	7

=== Bottom half ===
First round
8	(Poland) M Linette	6	6
(Sweden) J Larsson	4	1
(Slovenia) T Zidanšek	6	6
Q	(Australia) Ar Rodionova	2	4
(China) Y Duan	7	2	2
(Thailand) L Kumkhum	5	6	6
Q	(Australia) P Hon	6	1	3
4	(China) Q Wang	3	6	6
5	(Australia) A Tomljanović	6	6
(France) F Ferro	4	1
WC	(Japan) M Kato	6^{3}	2
(China) L Zhu	7^{7}	6
PR	(Luxembourg) M Minella	6	6
(Japan) K Nara	3	4
(Slovenia) P Hercog	6	1	3
2	(Chinese Taipei) S-w Hsieh	4	6	6

Second round
8	(Poland) M Linette	6	7^{7}
(Slovenia) T Zidanšek	3	6^{3}
(Thailand) L Kumkhum	5	3
4	(China) Q Wang	7	6
5	(Australia) A Tomljanović	7	6
(China) L Zhu	5	4
PR	(Luxembourg) M Minella	3	2
2	(Chinese Taipei) S-w Hsieh	6	6

Quarterfinals
8	(Poland) M Linette	2	2
4	(China) Q Wang	6	6
5	(Australia) A Tomljanović	6	2	0
2	(Chinese Taipei) S-w Hsieh	4	6	6

Semifinals
4	(China) Q Wang	4	4
2	(Chinese Taipei) S-w Hsieh	6	6

== Qualifying ==
=== Seeds ===
1. (United States) Amanda Anisimova (qualified)
2. (Germany) Antonia Lottner (first round)
3. (Australia) Arina Rodionova (qualified)
4. (China) Han Xinyun (second round)
5. (United Kingdom) Harriet Dart (second round)
6. (Montenegro) Danka Kovinić (first round)
7. (Australia) Priscilla Hon (qualified)
8. (South Korea) Jang Su-jeong (qualifying competition)

=== Qualifiers ===
1. (United States) Amanda Anisimova
2. (China) Zhang Yuxuan
3. (Australia) Arina Rodionova
4. (Australia) Priscilla Hon

=== Qualifying draw ===
==== First qualifier ====
First round
1	(United States) Amanda Anisimova	6	6
(Japan) Momoko Kobori	3	3
WC	(Poland) Urszula Radwańska	7^{9}	6
(Japan) Miharu Imanishi	6^{7}	1
Alt	(Japan) Hiroko Kuwata	6	6^{3}	6
(Japan) Mai Minokoshi	1	7^{7}	3
WC	(Japan) Makoto Ninomiya	2	7^{7}	2
5	(United Kingdom) Harriet Dart	6	6^{5}	6

Second round
1	(United States) Amanda Anisimova	6	3	6
WC	(Poland) Urszula Radwańska	1	6	4
Alt	(Japan) Hiroko Kuwata	6	7
5	(United Kingdom) Harriet Dart	4	5

Qualifying competition
1	(United States) Amanda Anisimova	6	6
Alt	(Japan) Hiroko Kuwata	3	2

==== Second qualifier ====
First round
2	(Germany) Antonia Lottner	3	4
(China) Zhang Yuxuan	6	6
(China) Zhang Kailin	3	7	4
(Russia) Valeria Savinykh	6	5	6
(Japan) Junri Namigata	2	3
(United States) Danielle Lao	6	6
(Australia) Ellen Perez	6	3	3
8	(South Korea) Jang Su-jeong	3	6	6

Second round
(China) Zhang Yuxuan	6	7
(Russia) Valeria Savinykh	3	5
(United States) Danielle Lao	5	3
8	(South Korea) Jang Su-jeong	7	6

Qualifying competition
(China) Zhang Yuxuan	4	6	6
8	(South Korea) Jang Su-jeong	6	3	1

==== Third qualifier ====
First round
3	(Australia) Arina Rodionova	6	0
(Japan) Eri Hozumi	0	0^{r}
(Japan) Risa Ozaki	4	6	3
WC	(Japan) Chihiro Muramatsu	6	3	6
(Germany) Anna Zaja	6	6
(Serbia) Dejana Radanović	4	3
(Spain) Sílvia Soler Espinosa	6	7
6	(Montenegro) Danka Kovinić	4	5

Second round
3	(Australia) Arina Rodionova	3	6	7
WC	(Japan) Chihiro Muramatsu	6	4	5
(Germany) Anna Zaja	3	4
(Spain) Sílvia Soler Espinosa	6	6

Qualifying competition
3	(Australia) Arina Rodionova	3	6	6
(Spain) Sílvia Soler Espinosa	6	2	3

==== Fourth qualifier ====
First round
4	(China) Han Xinyun	6	6
WC	(Japan) Shuko Aoyama	4	1
(Australia) Jaimee Fourlis	5	2
(Russia) Varvara Flink	7	6
(Chinese Taipei) Liang En-shuo	6	5	4
(South Korea) Han Na-lae	3	7	6
(Israel) Deniz Khazaniuk	3	6^{5}
7	(Australia) Priscilla Hon	6	7^{7}

Second round
4	(China) Han Xinyun	6^{7}	5
(Russia) Varvara Flink	7^{9}	7
(South Korea) Han Na-lae	2	2
7	(Australia) Priscilla Hon	6	6

Qualifying competition
(Russia) Varvara Flink	3	2
7	(Australia) Priscilla Hon	6	6
