= 2018 Connecticut Open – Doubles =

Tennis tournament event

Doubles
- 2018 Connecticut Open

Final
- Champions: (Czech Republic) Andrea Sestini Hlaváčková (Czech Republic) Barbora Strýcová
- Runners-up: (Chinese Taipei) Hsieh Su-wei (Germany) Laura Siegemund
- Score: 6–4, 6–7^{(7–9)}, [10–4]

Events
Singles	Doubles
← 2017 ·	Connecticut Open

Gabriela Dabrowski and Xu Yifan were the defending champions, but chose not to participate this year.

Andrea Sestini Hlaváčková and Barbora Strýcová won the title, defeating Hsieh Su-wei and Laura Siegemund in the final, 6–4, 6–7^{(7–9)}, [10–4]

== Seeds ==
1. (Czech Republic) Andrea Sestini Hlaváčková / (Czech Republic) Barbora Strýcová (champions)
2. (Netherlands) Demi Schuurs / (Slovenia) Katarina Srebotnik (first round, retired)
3. (Netherlands) Kiki Bertens / (Sweden) Johanna Larsson (quarterfinals)
4. (Romania) Irina-Camelia Begu / (Romania) Monica Niculescu (first round)

== Draw ==
=== Key ===
- Q = Qualifier
- WC = Wild card
- LL = Lucky loser
- Alt = Alternate
- SE = Special exempt
- PR = Protected ranking
- ITF = ITF entry
- JE = Junior exempt
- w/o = Walkover
- r = Retired
- d = Defaulted
- SR = Special ranking

=== Draw ===
First round
1	(Czech Republic) A Sestini Hlaváčková (Czech Republic) B Strýcová	6	6
(Japan) S Aoyama (Belarus) L Marozava	2	1
(Croatia) D Jurak (Romania) R Olaru	6^{2}	7^{7}	[10]
(Slovenia) D Jakupović (Czech Republic) R Voráčová	7^{7}	6^{2}	[8]
3	(Netherlands) K Bertens (Sweden) J Larsson	6	6
Alt	(Australia) M Adamczak (Georgia (country)) O Kalashnikova	3	4
(Poland) A Rosolska (United States) A Spears	6	6
(United States) R Atawo (Germany) A-L Grönefeld	3	4
Alt	(Belgium) K Flipkens (Belgium) A Van Uytvanck	7^{7}	4	[6]
WC	(Czech Republic) Ka Plíšková (Czech Republic) Kr Plíšková	6^{4}	6	[10]
(Ukraine) N Kichenok (Australia) An Rodionova	2	7^{7}	[10]
4	(Romania) I-C Begu (Romania) M Niculescu	6	6^{4}	[8]
PR	(Chinese Taipei) S-w Hsieh (Germany) L Siegemund	6^{2}	7^{7}	[10]
WC	(United States) D Krawczyk (United States) S Vickery	7^{7}	6^{4}	[8]
(Spain) L Arruabarrena (Ukraine) L Kichenok	6	0
2	(Netherlands) D Schuurs (Slovenia) K Srebotnik	4	1^{r}

Quarterfinals
1	(Czech Republic) A Sestini Hlaváčková (Czech Republic) B Strýcová	6	6
(Croatia) D Jurak (Romania) R Olaru	3	3
3	(Netherlands) K Bertens (Sweden) J Larsson	6	5	[5]
(Poland) A Rosolska (United States) A Spears	4	7	[10]
WC	(Czech Republic) Ka Plíšková (Czech Republic) Kr Plíšková	6	5	[10]
(Ukraine) N Kichenok (Australia) An Rodionova	4	7	[5]
PR	(Chinese Taipei) S-w Hsieh (Germany) L Siegemund	4	6	[10]
(Spain) L Arruabarrena (Ukraine) L Kichenok	6	3	[8]

Semifinals
1	(Czech Republic) A Sestini Hlaváčková (Czech Republic) B Strýcová	3	6	[12]
(Poland) A Rosolska (United States) A Spears	6	3	[10]
WC	(Czech Republic) Ka Plíšková (Czech Republic) Kr Plíšková
PR	(Chinese Taipei) S-w Hsieh (Germany) L Siegemund	w/o

Final
1	(Czech Republic) A Sestini Hlaváčková (Czech Republic) B Strýcová	6	6^{7}	[10]
PR	(Chinese Taipei) S-w Hsieh (Germany) L Siegemund	4	7^{9}	[4]
