= 2018 Bucharest Open =

- Date: 16–22 July
- Edition: 5th
- Category: WTA International
- Draw: 32S / 16D
- Prize money: $250,000
- Surface: Clay
- Location: Bucharest, Romania
- Venue: Arenele BNR

Champions

Singles
- (Latvia) Anastasija Sevastova

Doubles
- (Romania) Irina-Camelia Begu / (Romania) Andreea Mitu
- Bucharest Open

The 2018 BRD Bucharest Open was a women's professional tennis tournament played on outdoor clay courts. It was the fifth edition of the tournament and part of the International category of the 2018 WTA Tour. It was held from 16 July until 22 July 2018 at the Arenele BNR in Bucharest, Romania. First-seeded Anastasija Sevastova won the singles title.

== Finals ==
=== Singles ===
- (Latvia) Anastasija Sevastova defeated (Croatia) Petra Martić, 7–6^{(7–4)}, 6–2

=== Doubles ===
- (Romania) Irina-Camelia Begu / (Romania) Andreea Mitu defeated (Montenegro) Danka Kovinić / (Belgium) Maryna Zanevska 6–3, 6–4

== Points and prize money ==
=== Point distribution ===
| Event | W | F | SF | QF | Round of 16 | Round of 32 | Q | Q3 | Q2 | Q1 |
| Singles | 280 | 180 | 110 | 60 | 30 | 1 | 18 | 14 | 10 | 1 |
| Doubles | 280 | 180 | 110 | 60 | 1 | —N/a | —N/a | —N/a | —N/a | —N/a |

=== Prize money ===
| Event | W | F | SF | QF | Round of 16 | Round of 32 | Q3 | Q2 | Q1 |
| Singles | $43,000 | $21,400 | $11,300 | $5,900 | $3,310 | $1,925 | $1,005 | $730 | $530 |
| Doubles | $12,300 | $6,400 | $3,435 | $1,820 | $960 | —N/a | —N/a | —N/a | |

== Singles main-draw entrants ==
=== Seeds ===
| Country | Player | Rank^{1} | Seed |
|---|---|---|---|
| LAT | Anastasija Sevastova | 21 | 1 |
| ROU | Mihaela Buzărnescu | 28 | 2 |
| ROU | Irina-Camelia Begu | 36 | 3 |
| CRO | Petra Martić | 43 | 4 |
| ROU | Sorana Cîrstea | 51 | 5 |
| ROU | Ana Bogdan | 59 | 6 |
| FRA | Pauline Parmentier | 63 | 7 |
| SLO | Polona Hercog | 64 | 8 |

- ^{1} Rankings as of 2 July 2018.

=== Other entrants ===
The following players received wildcards into the singles main draw:

- (Romania) Miriam Bulgaru
- (Romania) Andreea Roșca
- (Romania) Elena-Gabriela Ruse

The following players received entry using a protected ranking into the singles main draw:

- (Germany) Laura Siegemund

The following players received entry from the qualifying draw:

- (Romania) Irina Bara
- (Turkey) Çağla Büyükakçay
- (United States) Claire Liu
- (Slovakia) Rebecca Šramková

=== Withdrawals ===
Before the tournament

- (Italy) Sara Errani → replaced by (Tunisia) Ons Jabeur
- (Estonia) Kaia Kanepi → replaced by (Belgium) Ysaline Bonaventure
- (Romania) Monica Niculescu → replaced by (Bulgaria) Viktoriya Tomova
- (Kazakhstan) Yulia Putintseva → replaced by (Italy) Jasmine Paolini
- (Spain) Carla Suárez Navarro → replaced by (Russia) Vera Zvonareva

=== Retirements ===
- (Slovenia) Polona Hercog

== WTA doubles main-draw entrants ==
=== Seeds ===
| Country | Player | Country | Player | Rank^{1} | Seed |
|---|---|---|---|---|---|
| ROU | Mihaela Buzărnescu | ROU | Raluca Olaru | 82 | 1 |
| AUS | Monique Adamczak | AUS | Jessica Moore | 127 | 2 |
| ROU | Irina Bara | GER | Nicola Geuer | 171 | 3 |
| BLR | Lidziya Marozava | NED | Arantxa Rus | 178 | 4 |

- Rankings are as of July 2, 2018

=== Other entrants ===
The following pairs received wildcards into the doubles main draw:

- (Romania) Irina-Camelia Begu / (Romania) Andreea Mitu
- (Hungary) Anna Bondár / (Romania) Miriam Bulgaru
