= 2018 Japan Women's Open =

- Date: September 10–16
- Edition: 10th
- Category: WTA International
- Draw: 32S / 16D
- Prize money: $250,000
- Surface: Hard
- Location: Hiroshima, Japan
- Venue: Regional Park Tennis Stadium

Champions

Singles
- (Chinese Taipei) Hsieh Su-wei

Doubles
- (Japan) Eri Hozumi / (China) Zhang Shuai
← 2017 ·	Japan Women's Open	· 2019 →

The 2018 Japan Women's Open was a women's tennis tournament played on outdoor hard courts. It was the tenth edition of the Japan Women's Open, and part of the WTA International tournaments of the 2018 WTA Tour. It was held at the Regional Park Tennis Stadium in Hiroshima, Japan, from September 10 through September 16, 2018. This is the first year that the tournament was held in Hiroshima.

== Finals ==
=== Singles ===
- (Chinese Taipei) Hsieh Su-wei defeated (United States) Amanda Anisimova 6–2, 6–2

=== Doubles ===
- (Japan) Eri Hozumi / (China) Zhang Shuai defeated (Japan) Miyu Kato / (Japan) Makoto Ninomiya 6–2, 6–4

== Point distribution ==
Event	W	F	SF	QF	Round of 16	Round of 32	Q	Q3	Q2	Q1
Singles	280	180	110	60	30	1	18	14	10	1
Doubles	280	180	110	60	1	—	—	—	—	—

=== Prize money ===
Event	W	F	SF	QF	Round of 16	Round of 32^{1}	Q3	Q2	Q1
Singles	$43,000	$21,400	$11,300	$5,900	$3,310	$1,925	$1,005	$730	$530
Doubles^{2}	$12,300	$6,400	$3,435	$1,820	$960	—	—	—	—

_{^{1} Qualifiers prize money is also the Round of 32 prize money}
_{^{2} Per team}

== Singles main-draw entrants ==
=== Seeds ===
Country	Player	Rank^{1}	Seed
CHN	Zhang Shuai	34	1
TPE	Hsieh Su-wei	43	2
KAZ	Yulia Putintseva	50	3
CHN	Wang Qiang	52	4
AUS	Ajla Tomljanović	58	5
KAZ	Zarina Diyas	60	6
CHN	Zheng Saisai	63	7
POL	Magda Linette	68	8

- Rankings are as of August 27, 2018

=== Other entrants ===
The following players received wildcards into the singles main draw:

- (Japan) Misaki Doi
- (Japan) Nao Hibino
- (Japan) Miyu Kato

The following player entered the singles main draw with a protected ranking:

- (Luxembourg) Mandy Minella

The following players received entry from the qualifying draw:

- (United States) Amanda Anisimova
- (Australia) Priscilla Hon
- (Australia) Arina Rodionova
- (China) Zhang Yuxuan

=== Withdrawals ===
Before the tournament

- (Romania) Ana Bogdan → replaced by (France) Fiona Ferro
- (United States) Jennifer Brady → replaced by (Croatia) Jana Fett
- (Belarus) Aliaksandra Sasnovich → replaced by (China) Duan Yingying
- (Switzerland) Stefanie Vögele → replaced by (Poland) Magdalena Fręch

=== Retirements ===
- (Kazakhstan) Yulia Putintseva (lower back injury)

== Doubles main-draw entrants ==
=== Seeds ===
Country	Player	Country	Player	Rank^{1}	Seed
JPN	Miyu Kato	JPN	Makoto Ninomiya	80	1
JPN	Eri Hozumi	CHN	Zhang Shuai	94	2
JPN	Shuko Aoyama	CHN	Duan Yingying	121	3
SUI	Viktorija Golubic	SWE	Johanna Larsson	123	4

- ^{1} Rankings are as of August 27, 2018

=== Other entrants ===
The following pairs received wildcards into the doubles main draw:

- (Japan) Miharu Imanishi / (Poland) Alicja Rosolska
- (Japan) Hiroko Kuwata / (Japan) Chihiro Muramatsu

=== Withdrawals ===
During the tournament

- (Australia) Priscilla Hon (gastrointestinal illness)
