= 2018 Ladies Open Lugano =

- Date: 9 – 15 April
- Edition: 2nd
- Category: WTA International tournaments
- Draw: 32S / 16D
- Prize money: $250,000
- Surface: Clay
- Location: Lugano, Switzerland
- Venue: Tennis Club Lido Lugano

Champions

Singles
- (Belgium) Elise Mertens

Doubles
- (Belgium) Kirsten Flipkens / (Belgium) Elise Mertens
- Ladies Open Lugano

The 2018 Ladies Open Lugano (also known as the 2018 Samsung Open presented by Cornèr for sponsorship reasons) was a women's tennis tournament played on clay courts at TC Lido Lugano. It was the second edition of the tournament (the first to take place in Lugano) and part of the International category of the 2018 WTA Tour. It took place between 9 April through 15 April 2018.

== Points and prize money ==
=== Point distribution ===
Event	W	F	SF	QF	Round of 16	Round of 32	Q	Q2	Q1
Women's singles	280	180	110	60	30	1	18	12	1
Women's doubles	280	180	110	60	1	—N/a	—N/a	—N/a	—N/a

=== Prize money ===
Event	W	F	SF	QF	Round of 16	Round of 32	Q2	Q1
Women's singles	$43,000	$21,400	$11,500	$6,175	$3,400	$2,100	$1,020	$600
Women's doubles	$12,300	$6,400	$3,435	$1,820	$960	—N/a	—N/a	—N/a

== Singles main draw entrants ==
=== Seeds ===
Country	Player	Rank^{1}	Seed
FRA	Kristina Mladenovic	19	1
BEL	Elise Mertens	20	2
ESP	~~Carla Suárez Navarro~~	~~23~~	~~3~~
EST	Anett Kontaveit	28	4
RUS	Svetlana Kuznetsova	29	5
FRA	Alizé Cornet	37	6
ROU	Mihaela Buzărnescu	39	7
BLR	Aliaksandra Sasnovich	49	8
BEL	Alison Van Uytvanck	51	9

- ^{1} Rankings are as of 2 April 2018.

=== Other entrants ===
The following players received wildcards into the main draw:

- (Russia) Svetlana Kuznetsova
- (Switzerland) Jil Teichmann
- (Switzerland) Stefanie Vögele

The following players received entry using a protected ranking into the main draw:

- (Luxembourg) Mandy Minella

The following players received entry from the qualifying draw:

- (Romania) Alexandra Cadanțu
- (Liechtenstein) Kathinka von Deichmann
- (Netherlands) Richèl Hogenkamp
- (Germany) Tamara Korpatsch
- (Montenegro) Danka Kovinić
- (Belarus) Vera Lapko

The following player received entry as a lucky loser:

- (Poland) Magdalena Fręch

=== Withdrawals ===
Before the tournament

- (Switzerland) Timea Bacsinszky → replaced by (Slovenia) Polona Hercog
- (Netherlands) Kiki Bertens → replaced by (Luxembourg) Mandy Minella
- (Slovakia) Dominika Cibulková → replaced by (Czech Republic) Kristýna Plíšková
- (Romania) Sorana Cîrstea → replaced by (Chinese Taipei) Hsieh Su-wei
- (Germany) Anna-Lena Friedsam → replaced by (Kazakhstan) Yulia Putintseva
- (Ukraine) Kateryna Kozlova → replaced by (Germany) Laura Siegemund
- (Greece) Maria Sakkari → replaced by (Belgium) Kirsten Flipkens
- (Spain) Carla Suárez Navarro → replaced by (Poland) Magdalena Fręch

=== Retirements ===
- (France) Kristina Mladenovic
- (Germany) Laura Siegemund

== Doubles main draw entrants ==
=== Seeds ===
Country	Player	Country	Player	Rank^{1}	Seed
BEL	Kirsten Flipkens	BEL	Elise Mertens	75	1
POL	Alicja Rosolska	USA	Abigail Spears	83	2
ROU	Raluca Olaru	GBR	Anna Smith	97	3
AUS	Monique Adamczak	SUI	Xenia Knoll	116	4

- ^{1} Rankings are as of 2 April 2018.

=== Other entrants ===
The following pair received a wildcard into the main draw:

- (France) Amandine Hesse / (France) Kristina Mladenovic

The following pair received entry as alternates:

- (Hungary) Réka-Luca Jani / (Montenegro) Danka Kovinić

=== Withdrawals ===
Before the tournament

- (France) Kristina Mladenovic

== Champions ==
=== Singles ===
- (Belgium) Elise Mertens def. (Belarus) Aryna Sabalenka, 7–5, 6–2

=== Doubles ===
- (Belgium) Kirsten Flipkens / (Belgium) Elise Mertens def. (Belarus) Vera Lapko / (Belarus) Aryna Sabalenka, 6–1, 6–3
