= 2018 Tianjin Open =

- Date: October 8–14
- Edition: 5th
- Category: WTA International
- Draw: 32S / 16D
- Prize money: $750,000
- Surface: Hard
- Location: Tianjin, China
- Venue: Tuanbo International Tennis Centre

Champions

Singles
- (France) Caroline Garcia

Doubles
- (United States) Nicole Melichar / (Czech Republic) Květa Peschke
- Tianjin Open

The 2018 Tianjin Open was a women's professional tennis tournament played on hard courts. It was the 5th edition of the tournament, and was part of the WTA International category of the 2018 WTA Tour. It took place at the Tuanbo International Tennis Centre in Tianjin, China between 8 October and 14 October 2018. Second-seeded Caroline Garcia won the singles title.

== Finals ==
=== Singles ===
- (France) Caroline Garcia defeated (Czech Republic) Karolína Plíšková 7–6^{(9–7)}, 6–3

=== Doubles ===
- (United States) Nicole Melichar / (Czech Republic) Květa Peschke defeated (Australia) Monique Adamczak / (Australia) Jessica Moore 6–4, 6–2

== Points and prize money ==
=== Point distribution ===
Event	W	F	SF	QF	Round of 16	Round of 32	Q	Q2	Q1
Singles	280	180	110	60	30	1	18	12	1
Doubles	280	180	110	60	1	—N/a	—N/a	—N/a	—N/a

=== Prize money ===
Event	W	F	SF	QF	Round of 16	Round of 32^{1}	Q2	Q1
Singles	$163,265	$81,251	$43,663	$13,068	$7,195	$4,444	$2,160	$1,270
Doubles *	$26,031	$13,544	$7,271	$3,852	$2,031	—N/a	—N/a	—N/a

_{^{1} Qualifiers prize money is also the Round of 32 prize money}
_{* per team}

== Singles main-draw entrants ==
=== Seeds ===
Country	Player	Rank^{1}	Seed
CZE	Karolína Plíšková	7	1
FRA	Caroline Garcia	8	2
BEL	Elise Mertens	14	3
BLR	Aryna Sabalenka	16	4
TPE	Hsieh Su-wei	29	5
CRO	Petra Martić	36	6
USA	Danielle Collins	37	7
GRE	Maria Sakkari	43	8

- ^{1} Rankings are as of October 1, 2018

=== Other entrants ===
The following players received wildcards into the singles main draw:

- (China) Liu Fangzhou
- (Czech Republic) Karolína Plíšková
- (China) Yuan Yue

The following player received entry through a protected ranking:

- (Switzerland) Timea Bacsinszky

The following players received entry from the qualifying draw:

- (Slovakia) Jana Čepelová
- (Japan) Misaki Doi
- (Czech Republic) Barbora Krejčíková
- (Russia) Veronika Kudermetova
- (China) Xun Fangying
- (China) Zhang Yuxuan

=== Withdrawals ===
- (Belarus) Victoria Azarenka → replaced by (United Kingdom) Katie Boulter
- (Romania) Mihaela Buzărnescu → replaced by (China) Duan Yingying
- (Russia) Maria Sharapova → replaced by (China) Wang Yafan

=== Retirements ===
- (United States) Danielle Collins
- (Ukraine) Kateryna Kozlova
- (Croatia) Petra Martić
- (Belgium) Elise Mertens

== Doubles main-draw entrants ==
=== Seeds ===
Country	Player	Country	Player	Rank^{1}	Seed
ROU	Irina-Camelia Begu	CZE	Barbora Krejčíková	25	1
~~CAN~~	~~Gabriela Dabrowski~~	~~CHN~~	~~Xu Yifan~~	~~25~~	~~2~~
USA	Nicole Melichar	CZE	Květa Peschke	32	3
USA	Kaitlyn Christian	USA	Desirae Krawczyk	120	4

- ^{1} Rankings are as of October 1, 2018

=== Other entrants ===
The following pairs received wildcards into the doubles main draw:

- (China) Guo Hanyu / (China) Zhu Lin
- (China) Liu Yanni / (China) Wang Meiling

The following pair received entry as alternates:

- (India) Ankita Raina / (United Kingdom) Emily Webley-Smith

=== Withdrawals ===
Before the tournament

- (Canada) Gabriela Dabrowski

=== Retirements ===
- (Spain) Lara Arruabarrena
