= 2018 Connecticut Open =

- Date: August 19–25
- Edition: 50th
- Category: WTA Premier
- Draw: 30S / 16D / 48Q
- Prize money: $799,000
- Surface: Hard
- Location: New Haven, Connecticut, United States
- Venue: Cullman-Heyman Tennis Center

Champions

Singles
- (Belarus) Aryna Sabalenka

Doubles
- (Czech Republic) Andrea Sestini Hlaváčková / (Czech Republic) Barbora Strýcová
← 2017 ·	Connecticut Open

The 2018 Connecticut Open (also known as the 2018 Connecticut Open presented by United Technologies for sponsorship reasons) was a tennis tournament played on outdoor hard courts. It was the 50th edition of the Connecticut Open, and part of the Premier Series of the 2018 WTA Tour. It took place at the Cullman-Heyman Tennis Center in New Haven, Connecticut, United States, from August 19 through August 25. It was the last event of the 2018 US Open Series before the 2018 US Open.

== Points ==
=== Point distribution ===
Event	W	F	SF	QF	Round of 16	Round of 32	Q	Q3	Q2	Q1
Singles	470	305	185	100	55	1	25	18	13	1
Doubles	470	305	185	100	1	—	—	—	—	—

== Prize money ==
Event	W	F	SF	QF	Round of 16	Round of 32^{1}	Q3	Q2	Q1
Singles	$132,740	$70,880	$37,850	$20,350	$10,915	$6,925	$3,110	$1,650	$920
Doubles*	$41,520	$22,180	$12,120	$6,165	$3,350	—	—	—	—

_{^{1}Qualifiers prize money is also the Round of 32 prize money.}
_{*per team}

== Singles main-draw entrants ==
=== Seeds ===
Country	Player	Rank*	Seed
~~ROU~~	~~Simona Halep~~	~~1~~	~~1~~
FRA	Caroline Garcia	5	2
CZE	Petra Kvitová	6	3
CZE	Karolína Plíšková	8	4
GER	Julia Görges	10	5
~~AUS~~	~~Ashleigh Barty~~	~~16~~	~~6~~
~~NED~~	~~Kiki Bertens~~	~~17~~	~~7~~
CZE	Barbora Strýcová	22	8
AUS	Daria Gavrilova	23	9

- Rankings are as of August 13, 2018

=== Other entrants ===
The following players received wildcards into the singles main draw:

- (United States) Danielle Collins
- ~~(Romania) Simona Halep~~
- (Czech Republic) Karolína Plíšková
- (United States) CoCo Vandeweghe

The following players received entry using protected rankings:

- (Switzerland) Timea Bacsinszky
- (Germany) Laura Siegemund

The following players received entry from the qualifying draw:

- (Romania) Ana Bogdan
- (Kazakhstan) Zarina Diyas
- (Italy) Camila Giorgi
- (Puerto Rico) Monica Puig
- (Belarus) Aliaksandra Sasnovich
- (Ukraine) Dayana Yastremska

The following players received entry as lucky losers:

- (Switzerland) Belinda Bencic
- (France) Pauline Parmentier
- (Australia) Samantha Stosur

=== Withdrawals ===
Before the tournament

- (Australia) Ashleigh Barty → replaced by (Australia) Samantha Stosur
- (Netherlands) Kiki Bertens → replaced by (France) Pauline Parmentier
- (Romania) Mihaela Buzărnescu → replaced by (Romania) Irina-Camelia Begu
- (Romania) Simona Halep → replaced by (Switzerland) Belinda Bencic
- (Russia) Daria Kasatkina → replaced by (Greece) Maria Sakkari

During the tournament

- (United Kingdom) Johanna Konta

=== Retirements ===
- (Czech Republic) Petra Kvitová
- (Puerto Rico) Monica Puig
- (United States) CoCo Vandeweghe

== Doubles main-draw entrants ==
=== Seeds ===
Country	Player	Country	Player	Rank*	Seed
CZE	Andrea Sestini Hlaváčková	CZE	Barbora Strýcová	15	1
NED	Demi Schuurs	SLO	Katarina Srebotnik	38	2
NED	Kiki Bertens	SWE	Johanna Larsson	41	3
ROU	Irina-Camelia Begu	ROU	Monica Niculescu	57	4

- Rankings are as of 13 August 2018

=== Other entrants ===
The following pair received a wildcard into the doubles main draw:

- (United States) Desirae Krawczyk / (United States) Sachia Vickery
- (Czech Republic) Karolína Plíšková / (Czech Republic) Kristýna Plíšková

The following pairs received entry as alternates:

- (Australia) Monique Adamczak / (Georgia (country)) Oksana Kalashnikova
- (Belgium) Kirsten Flipkens / (Belgium) Alison Van Uytvanck

=== Withdrawals ===
Before the tournament

- (United Kingdom) Johanna Konta
- (United States) CoCo Vandeweghe

=== Retirements ===
- (Netherlands) Demi Schuurs

== Finals ==
=== Singles ===
- (Belarus) Aryna Sabalenka defeated (Spain) Carla Suárez Navarro, 6–1, 6–4

=== Doubles ===
- (Czech Republic) Andrea Sestini Hlaváčková / (Czech Republic) Barbora Strýcová defeated (Chinese Taipei) Hsieh Su-wei / (Germany) Laura Siegemund, 6–4, 6–7^{(7–9)}, [10–4]
