= 2018 WTA Tour =

Women's tennis circuit

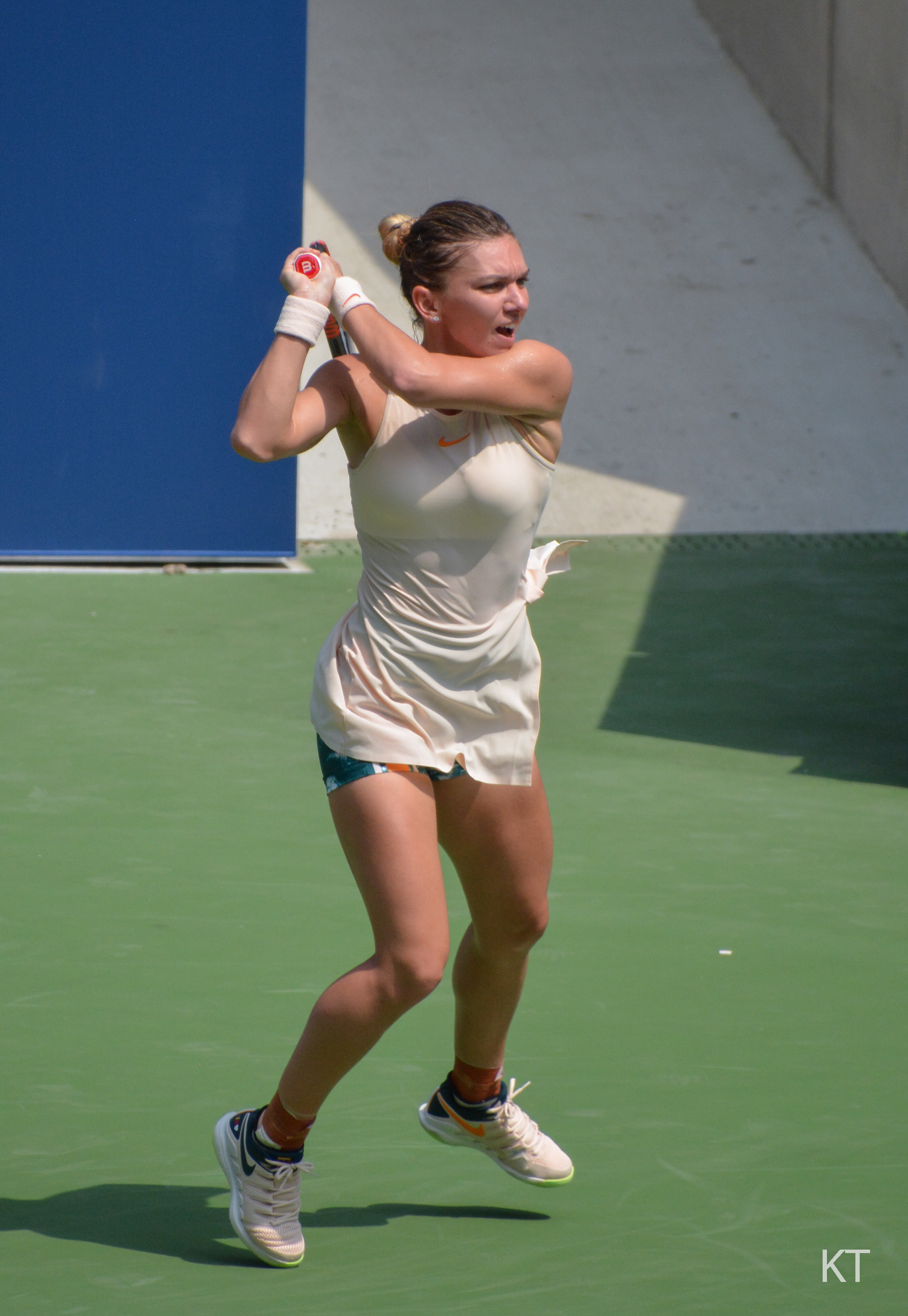
- Simona Halep finished the year as world No. 1 for the second time in her career. She won three singles tournaments during the season, including a major at the French Open. She also won a Premier 5 event, and finished runner-up at another major, the Australian Open.

Details
- Duration: 30 December 2017 – 11 November 2018
- Edition: 48th
- Tournaments: 58
- Categories: Grand Slam (4); WTA Finals; WTA Premier Mandatory (4); WTA Premier 5 (5); WTA Premier (12); WTA International (31); WTA Elite Trophy

Achievements (singles)
- Most titles: (Czech Republic) Petra Kvitová (5)
- Most finals: (Romania) Simona Halep (6)
- Prize money leader: (Romania) Simona Halep ($7,409,564)
- Points leader: (Romania) Simona Halep (6,921)

Awards
- Player of the year: (Romania) Simona Halep
- Doubles team of the year: (Czech Republic) Barbora Krejčíková (Czech Republic) Kateřina Siniaková
- Most improved player of the year: (Netherlands) Kiki Bertens
- Newcomer of the year: (Belarus) Aryna Sabalenka
- Comeback player of the year: (United States) Serena Williams

The 2018 WTA Tour was the elite professional tennis circuit organised by the Women's Tennis Association (WTA) for the 2018 tennis season. The 2018 WTA Tour calendar comprises the Grand Slam tournaments, supervised by the International Tennis Federation (ITF); the WTA Premier tournaments (Premier Mandatory, Premier 5, and regular Premier); the WTA International tournaments; the Fed Cup (organized by the ITF) and the year-end championships (the WTA Tour Championships and the WTA Elite Trophy). Also included in the 2018 calendar is the Hopman Cup, which is organized by the ITF and does not distribute ranking points.

== Schedule ==
This is the complete schedule of events on the 2018 calendar, with player progression documented from the quarterfinals stage.

Key

Grand Slam tournaments
Year-end championships
WTA Premier Mandatory
WTA Premier 5
WTA Premier
WTA International
Team events

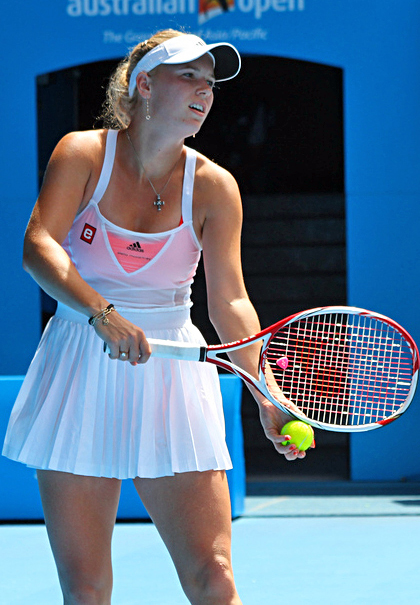
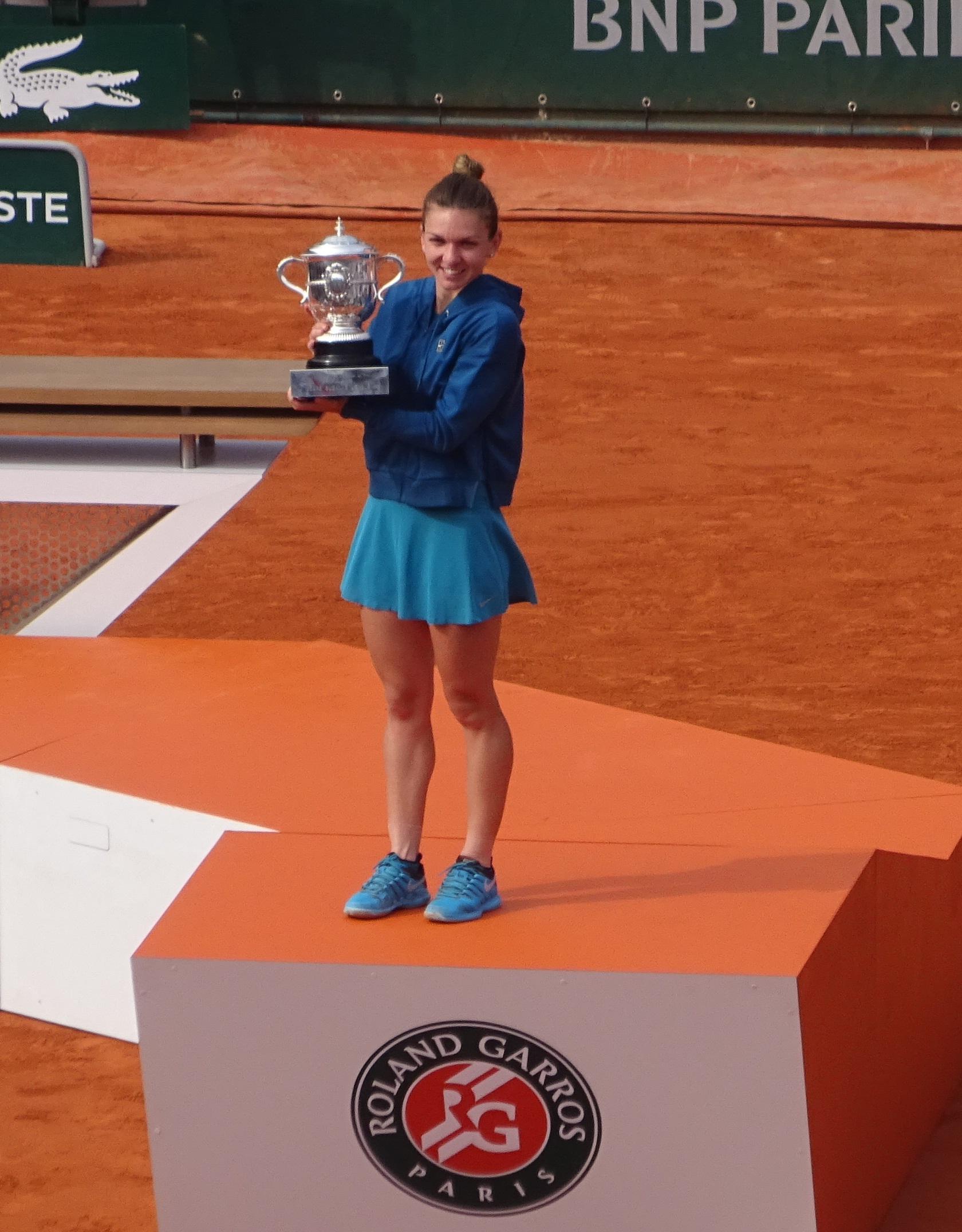
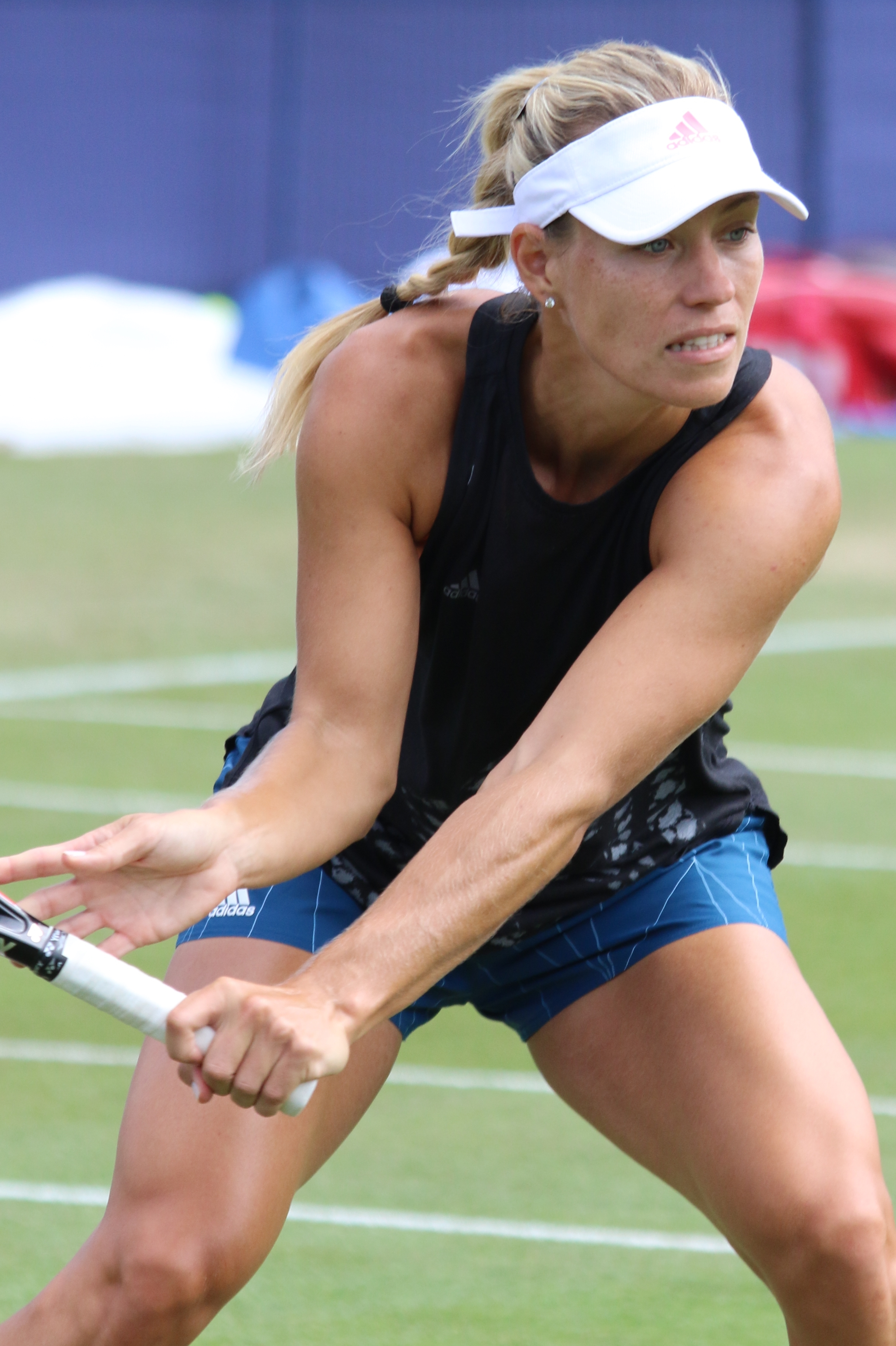
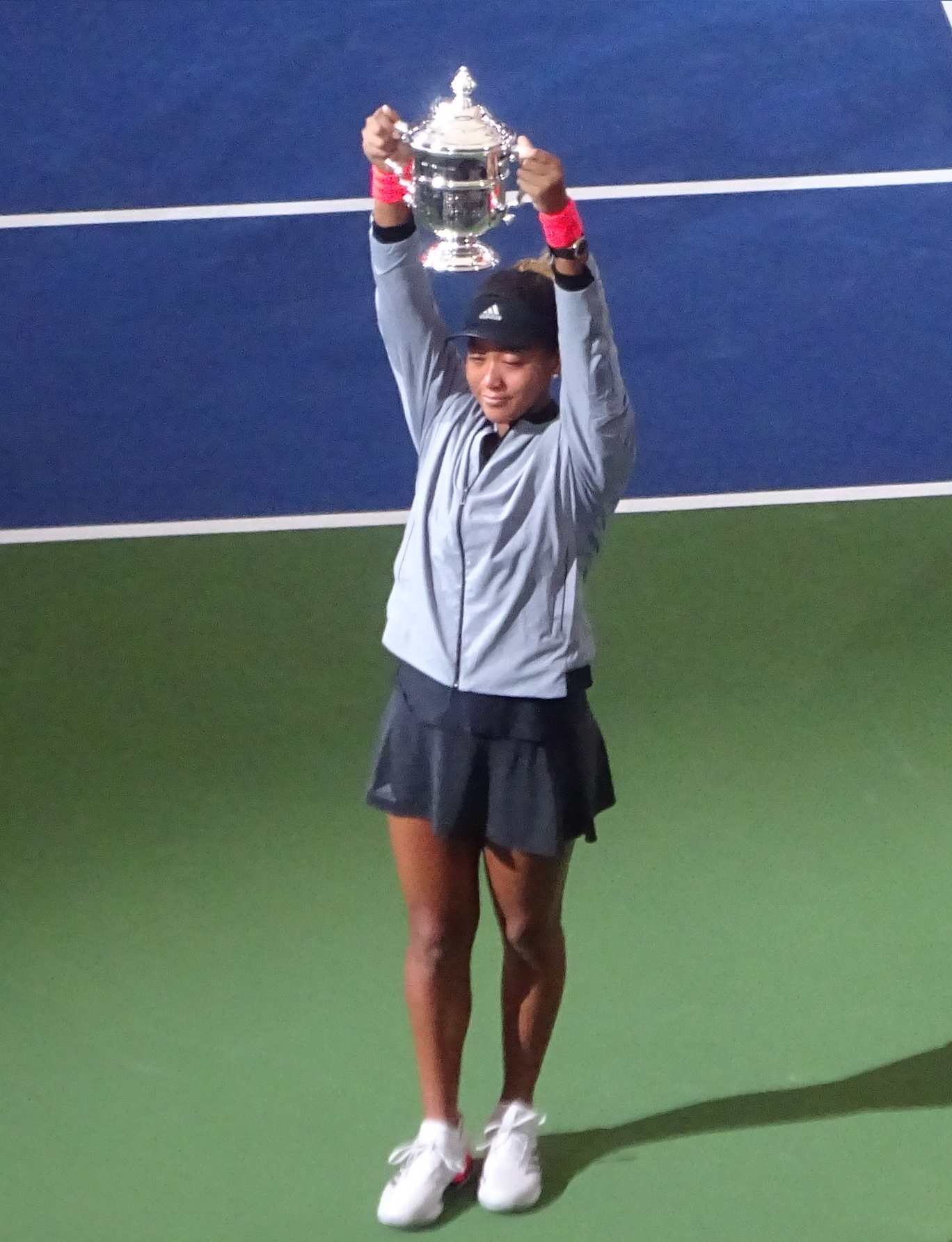
Caroline Wozniacki won her first major title at the Australian Open by defeating Simona Halep in the final, returning to the world No. 1 ranking for the first time since 2012. Halep then went on to win her first major at the French Open on her fourth appearance in a major final, defeating Sloane Stephens in three sets. Angelique Kerber won her third major singles title at Wimbledon, defeating Serena Williams in the final and becoming the first German since Steffi Graf in 1996 to lift the trophy. Naomi Osaka won her first major title at the US Open, defeating Serena Williams in the final. At the age of 20, Osaka became the first Japanese woman to win a major singles title and the youngest US Open champion since Maria Sharapova in 2006.

=== January ===
Week	Tournament	Champions	Runners-up	Semifinalists	Quarterfinalists
1 Jan	Hopman Cup; Perth, Australia; ITF Mixed Teams Championships; Hard (i) – 8 teams (RR)	Switzerland; 2–1	Germany	Round robin (Group A) Belgium; Australia; Canada	Round robin (Group B) United States; Russia; Japan
1 Jan	Brisbane International; Brisbane, Australia; WTA Premier $1,000,000 – hard – 30S/32Q/16D; Singles – Doubles	(Ukraine) Elina Svitolina; 6–2, 6–1	(Belarus) Aliaksandra Sasnovich	(Latvia) Anastasija Sevastova (Czech Republic) Karolína Plíšková	(Serbia) Aleksandra Krunić (France) Alizé Cornet (United Kingdom) Johanna Konta (Estonia) Kaia Kanepi
1 Jan	Brisbane International; Brisbane, Australia; WTA Premier $1,000,000 – hard – 30S/32Q/16D; Singles – Doubles	(Netherlands) Kiki Bertens (Netherlands) Demi Schuurs; 7–5, 6–2	(Slovenia) Andreja Klepač (Spain) María José Martínez Sánchez	(Latvia) Anastasija Sevastova (Czech Republic) Karolína Plíšková	(Serbia) Aleksandra Krunić (France) Alizé Cornet (United Kingdom) Johanna Konta (Estonia) Kaia Kanepi
1 Jan	Shenzhen Open; Shenzhen, China; WTA International $750,000 – hard – 32S/16Q/16D; Singles – Doubles	(Romania) Simona Halep; 6–1, 2–6, 6–0	(Czech Republic) Kateřina Siniaková	(Romania) Irina-Camelia Begu (Russia) Maria Sharapova	(Belarus) Aryna Sabalenka (Hungary) Tímea Babos (Kazakhstan) Zarina Diyas (Czech Republic) Kristýna Plíšková
1 Jan	Shenzhen Open; Shenzhen, China; WTA International $750,000 – hard – 32S/16Q/16D; Singles – Doubles	(Romania) Irina-Camelia Begu (Romania) Simona Halep; 1–6, 6–1, [10–8]	(Czech Republic) Barbora Krejčíková (Czech Republic) Kateřina Siniaková	(Romania) Irina-Camelia Begu (Russia) Maria Sharapova	(Belarus) Aryna Sabalenka (Hungary) Tímea Babos (Kazakhstan) Zarina Diyas (Czech Republic) Kristýna Plíšková
1 Jan	Auckland Open; Auckland, New Zealand; WTA International $250,000 – hard – 32S/32Q/16D; Singles – Doubles	(Germany) Julia Görges; 6–4, 7–6^{(7–4)}	(Denmark) Caroline Wozniacki	(United States) Sachia Vickery (Chinese Taipei) Hsieh Su-wei	(United States) Sofia Kenin (Poland) Agnieszka Radwańska (Czech Republic) Barbora Strýcová (Slovenia) Polona Hercog
1 Jan	Auckland Open; Auckland, New Zealand; WTA International $250,000 – hard – 32S/32Q/16D; Singles – Doubles	(Italy) Sara Errani (Netherlands) Bibiane Schoofs; 7–5, 6–1	(Japan) Eri Hozumi (Japan) Miyu Kato	(United States) Sachia Vickery (Chinese Taipei) Hsieh Su-wei	(United States) Sofia Kenin (Poland) Agnieszka Radwańska (Czech Republic) Barbora Strýcová (Slovenia) Polona Hercog
8 Jan	Sydney International; Sydney, Australia; WTA Premier $799,000 – hard – 30S/32Q/16D; Singles – Doubles	(Germany) Angelique Kerber; 6–4, 6–4	(Australia) Ashleigh Barty	(Australia) Daria Gavrilova (Italy) Camila Giorgi	(Spain) Garbiñe Muguruza (Czech Republic) Barbora Strýcová (Poland) Agnieszka Radwańska (Slovakia) Dominika Cibulková
8 Jan	Sydney International; Sydney, Australia; WTA Premier $799,000 – hard – 30S/32Q/16D; Singles – Doubles	(Canada) Gabriela Dabrowski (China) Xu Yifan; 6–3, 6–1	(Chinese Taipei) Latisha Chan (Czech Republic) Andrea Sestini Hlaváčková	(Australia) Daria Gavrilova (Italy) Camila Giorgi	(Spain) Garbiñe Muguruza (Czech Republic) Barbora Strýcová (Poland) Agnieszka Radwańska (Slovakia) Dominika Cibulková
8 Jan	Hobart International; Hobart, Australia; WTA International $250,000 – hard – 32S/24Q/16D; Singles – Doubles	(Belgium) Elise Mertens; 6–1, 4–6, 6–3	(Romania) Mihaela Buzărnescu	(Ukraine) Lesia Tsurenko (United Kingdom) Heather Watson	(Belarus) Aryna Sabalenka (United States) Alison Riske (Croatia) Donna Vekić (Romania) Monica Niculescu
8 Jan	Hobart International; Hobart, Australia; WTA International $250,000 – hard – 32S/24Q/16D; Singles – Doubles	(Belgium) Elise Mertens (Netherlands) Demi Schuurs; 6–2, 6–2	(Ukraine) Lyudmyla Kichenok (Japan) Makoto Ninomiya	(Ukraine) Lesia Tsurenko (United Kingdom) Heather Watson	(Belarus) Aryna Sabalenka (United States) Alison Riske (Croatia) Donna Vekić (Romania) Monica Niculescu
15 Jan; 22 Jan	Australian Open; Melbourne, Australia; Grand Slam; Hard – A$25,036,000; 128S/96Q/64D/32X; Singles – Doubles – Mixed doubles	(Denmark) Caroline Wozniacki; 7–6^{(7–2)}, 3–6, 6–4	(Romania) Simona Halep	(Germany) Angelique Kerber (Belgium) Elise Mertens	(Czech Republic) Karolína Plíšková (United States) Madison Keys (Ukraine) Elina Svitolina (Spain) Carla Suárez Navarro
15 Jan; 22 Jan	Australian Open; Melbourne, Australia; Grand Slam; Hard – A$25,036,000; 128S/96Q/64D/32X; Singles – Doubles – Mixed doubles	(Hungary) Tímea Babos (France) Kristina Mladenovic; 6–4, 6–3	(Russia) Ekaterina Makarova (Russia) Elena Vesnina	(Germany) Angelique Kerber (Belgium) Elise Mertens	(Czech Republic) Karolína Plíšková (United States) Madison Keys (Ukraine) Elina Svitolina (Spain) Carla Suárez Navarro
15 Jan; 22 Jan	Australian Open; Melbourne, Australia; Grand Slam; Hard – A$25,036,000; 128S/96Q/64D/32X; Singles – Doubles – Mixed doubles	(Canada) Gabriela Dabrowski (Croatia) Mate Pavić; 2–6, 6–4, [11–9]	(Hungary) Tímea Babos (India) Rohan Bopanna	(Germany) Angelique Kerber (Belgium) Elise Mertens	(Czech Republic) Karolína Plíšková (United States) Madison Keys (Ukraine) Elina Svitolina (Spain) Carla Suárez Navarro
29 Jan	St. Petersburg Ladies' Trophy; Saint Petersburg, Russia; WTA Premier; Hard (i) – $799,000 – 28S/32Q/16D; Singles – Doubles	(Czech Republic) Petra Kvitová; 6–1, 6–2	(France) Kristina Mladenovic	(Russia) Daria Kasatkina (Germany) Julia Görges	(Denmark) Caroline Wozniacki (Czech Republic) Kateřina Siniaková (Russia) Elena Rybakina (Latvia) Jeļena Ostapenko
29 Jan	St. Petersburg Ladies' Trophy; Saint Petersburg, Russia; WTA Premier; Hard (i) – $799,000 – 28S/32Q/16D; Singles – Doubles	(Switzerland) Timea Bacsinszky (Russia) Vera Zvonareva; 2–6, 6–1, [10–3]	(Russia) Alla Kudryavtseva (Slovenia) Katarina Srebotnik	(Russia) Daria Kasatkina (Germany) Julia Görges	(Denmark) Caroline Wozniacki (Czech Republic) Kateřina Siniaková (Russia) Elena Rybakina (Latvia) Jeļena Ostapenko
29 Jan	Taiwan Open; Taipei, Taiwan; WTA International; Hard (i) – $250,000 – 32S/24Q/16D; Singles – Doubles	(Hungary) Tímea Babos; 7–5, 6–1	(Ukraine) Kateryna Kozlova	(China) Wang Yafan (Germany) Sabine Lisicki	(Canada) Eugenie Bouchard (Poland) Magda Linette (Romania) Monica Niculescu (Kazakhstan) Yulia Putintseva
29 Jan	Taiwan Open; Taipei, Taiwan; WTA International; Hard (i) – $250,000 – 32S/24Q/16D; Singles – Doubles	(China) Duan Yingying (China) Wang Yafan; 7–6^{(7–4)}, 7–6^{(7–5)}	(Japan) Nao Hibino (Georgia (country)) Oksana Kalashnikova	(China) Wang Yafan (Germany) Sabine Lisicki	(Canada) Eugenie Bouchard (Poland) Magda Linette (Romania) Monica Niculescu (Kazakhstan) Yulia Putintseva

=== February ===
Week	Tournament	Champions	Runners-up	Semifinalists	Quarterfinalists
5 Feb	Fed Cup Quarterfinals; Minsk, Belarus – hard (i); Prague, Czech Republic – hard (i); La Roche-sur-Yon, France – hard (i); Asheville, North Carolina, United States – hard (i)	Quarterfinals winners: Germany 3–2; Czech Republic 3–1; France 3–2; United States 3–1	Quarterfinals losers: Belarus; Switzerland; Belgium; Netherlands		
12 Feb	Qatar Open; Doha, Qatar; WTA Premier 5 Hard – $3,198,000 – 56S/32Q/28D; Singles – Doubles	(Czech Republic) Petra Kvitová; 3–6, 6–3, 6–4	(Spain) Garbiñe Muguruza	(Denmark) Caroline Wozniacki (Romania) Simona Halep	(Germany) Angelique Kerber (Germany) Julia Görges (France) Caroline Garcia (United States) Catherine Bellis
12 Feb	Qatar Open; Doha, Qatar; WTA Premier 5 Hard – $3,198,000 – 56S/32Q/28D; Singles – Doubles	(Canada) Gabriela Dabrowski (Latvia) Jeļena Ostapenko; 6–3, 6–3	(Slovenia) Andreja Klepač (Spain) María José Martínez Sánchez	(Denmark) Caroline Wozniacki (Romania) Simona Halep	(Germany) Angelique Kerber (Germany) Julia Görges (France) Caroline Garcia (United States) Catherine Bellis
19 Feb	Dubai Tennis Championships; Dubai, United Arab Emirates; WTA Premier; Hard – $2,623,485 – 28S/32Q/16D; Singles – Doubles	(Ukraine) Elina Svitolina; 6–4, 6–0	(Russia) Daria Kasatkina	(Germany) Angelique Kerber (Spain) Garbiñe Muguruza	(Japan) Naomi Osaka (Czech Republic) Karolína Plíšková (Russia) Elena Vesnina (France) Caroline Garcia
19 Feb	Dubai Tennis Championships; Dubai, United Arab Emirates; WTA Premier; Hard – $2,623,485 – 28S/32Q/16D; Singles – Doubles	(Chinese Taipei) Chan Hao-ching (China) Yang Zhaoxuan; 4–6, 6–2, [10–6]	(Chinese Taipei) Hsieh Su-wei (China) Peng Shuai	(Germany) Angelique Kerber (Spain) Garbiñe Muguruza	(Japan) Naomi Osaka (Czech Republic) Karolína Plíšková (Russia) Elena Vesnina (France) Caroline Garcia
19 Feb	Hungarian Ladies Open; Budapest, Hungary; WTA International; Hard (i) – $250,000 – 32S/24Q/16D; Singles – Doubles	(Belgium) Alison Van Uytvanck; 6–3, 3–6, 7–5	(Slovakia) Dominika Cibulková	(Germany) Mona Barthel (Slovakia) Viktória Kužmová	(Sweden) Johanna Larsson (Belgium) Ysaline Bonaventure (Croatia) Petra Martić (China) Zhang Shuai
19 Feb	Hungarian Ladies Open; Budapest, Hungary; WTA International; Hard (i) – $250,000 – 32S/24Q/16D; Singles – Doubles	(Spain) Georgina García Pérez (Hungary) Fanny Stollár; 4–6, 6–4, [10–3]	(Belgium) Kirsten Flipkens (Sweden) Johanna Larsson	(Germany) Mona Barthel (Slovakia) Viktória Kužmová	(Sweden) Johanna Larsson (Belgium) Ysaline Bonaventure (Croatia) Petra Martić (China) Zhang Shuai
26 Feb	Mexican Open; Acapulco, Mexico; WTA International; Hard – $250,000 – 32S/24Q/16D; Singles – Doubles	(Ukraine) Lesia Tsurenko; 5–7, 7–6^{(7–2)}, 6–2	(Switzerland) Stefanie Vögele	(Sweden) Rebecca Peterson (Australia) Daria Gavrilova	(United States) Sloane Stephens (China) Zhang Shuai (Paraguay) Verónica Cepede Royg (France) Kristina Mladenovic
26 Feb	Mexican Open; Acapulco, Mexico; WTA International; Hard – $250,000 – 32S/24Q/16D; Singles – Doubles	(Germany) Tatjana Maria (United Kingdom) Heather Watson; 7–5, 2–6, [10–2]	(United States) Kaitlyn Christian (United States) Sabrina Santamaria	(Sweden) Rebecca Peterson (Australia) Daria Gavrilova	(United States) Sloane Stephens (China) Zhang Shuai (Paraguay) Verónica Cepede Royg (France) Kristina Mladenovic

=== March ===
Week	Tournament	Champions	Runners-up	Semifinalists	Quarterfinalists
5 Mar; 12 Mar	Indian Wells Open; Indian Wells, United States; WTA Premier Mandatory; Hard – $8,648,508 – 96S/48Q/32D; Singles – Doubles	(Japan) Naomi Osaka; 6–3, 6–2	(Russia) Daria Kasatkina	(Romania) Simona Halep (United States) Venus Williams	(Croatia) Petra Martić (Czech Republic) Karolína Plíšková (Spain) Carla Suárez Navarro (Germany) Angelique Kerber
5 Mar; 12 Mar	Indian Wells Open; Indian Wells, United States; WTA Premier Mandatory; Hard – $8,648,508 – 96S/48Q/32D; Singles – Doubles	(Chinese Taipei) Hsieh Su-wei (Czech Republic) Barbora Strýcová; 6–4, 6–4	(Russia) Ekaterina Makarova (Russia) Elena Vesnina	(Romania) Simona Halep (United States) Venus Williams	(Croatia) Petra Martić (Czech Republic) Karolína Plíšková (Spain) Carla Suárez Navarro (Germany) Angelique Kerber
19 Mar; 26 Mar	Miami Open; Key Biscayne, United States; WTA Premier Mandatory; Hard – $8,648,508 – 96S/48Q/32D; Singles – Doubles	(United States) Sloane Stephens; 7–6^{(7–5)}, 6–1	(Latvia) Jeļena Ostapenko	(Belarus) Victoria Azarenka (United States) Danielle Collins	(Czech Republic) Karolína Plíšková (Germany) Angelique Kerber (Ukraine) Elina Svitolina (United States) Venus Williams
19 Mar; 26 Mar	Miami Open; Key Biscayne, United States; WTA Premier Mandatory; Hard – $8,648,508 – 96S/48Q/32D; Singles – Doubles	(Australia) Ashleigh Barty (United States) CoCo Vandeweghe; 6–2, 6–1	(Czech Republic) Barbora Krejčíková (Czech Republic) Kateřina Siniaková	(Belarus) Victoria Azarenka (United States) Danielle Collins	(Czech Republic) Karolína Plíšková (Germany) Angelique Kerber (Ukraine) Elina Svitolina (United States) Venus Williams

=== April ===
Week	Tournament	Champions	Runners-up	Semifinalists	Quarterfinalists
2 Apr	Charleston Open; Charleston, United States; WTA Premier; Clay – $800,000 (Green) – 56S/32Q/16D; Singles – Doubles	(Netherlands) Kiki Bertens; 6–2, 6–1	(Germany) Julia Görges	(United States) Madison Keys (Latvia) Anastasija Sevastova	(France) Alizé Cornet (United States) Bernarda Pera (Russia) Daria Kasatkina (Czech Republic) Kristýna Plíšková
2 Apr	Charleston Open; Charleston, United States; WTA Premier; Clay – $800,000 (Green) – 56S/32Q/16D; Singles – Doubles	(Russia) Alla Kudryavtseva (Slovenia) Katarina Srebotnik; 6–3, 6–3	(Slovenia) Andreja Klepač (Spain) María José Martínez Sánchez	(United States) Madison Keys (Latvia) Anastasija Sevastova	(France) Alizé Cornet (United States) Bernarda Pera (Russia) Daria Kasatkina (Czech Republic) Kristýna Plíšková
2 Apr	Monterrey Open; Monterrey, Mexico; WTA International; Hard – $250,000 – 32S/32Q/16D; Singles – Doubles	(Spain) Garbiñe Muguruza; 3–6, 6–4, 6–3	(Hungary) Tímea Babos	(Romania) Ana Bogdan (United States) Sachia Vickery	(Australia) Ajla Tomljanović (United States) Danielle Collins (Puerto Rico) Monica Puig (Slovakia) Magdaléna Rybáriková
2 Apr	Monterrey Open; Monterrey, Mexico; WTA International; Hard – $250,000 – 32S/32Q/16D; Singles – Doubles	(United Kingdom) Naomi Broady (Spain) Sara Sorribes Tormo; 3–6, 6–4, [10–8]	(United States) Desirae Krawczyk (Mexico) Giuliana Olmos	(Romania) Ana Bogdan (United States) Sachia Vickery	(Australia) Ajla Tomljanović (United States) Danielle Collins (Puerto Rico) Monica Puig (Slovakia) Magdaléna Rybáriková
9 Apr	Ladies Open Lugano; Lugano, Switzerland; WTA International; Clay (red) – $250,000 – 32S/24Q/16D; Singles – Doubles	(Belgium) Elise Mertens; 7–5, 6–2	(Belarus) Aryna Sabalenka	(Switzerland) Stefanie Vögele (Belarus) Vera Lapko	(Germany) Tamara Korpatsch (Italy) Camila Giorgi (Belgium) Kirsten Flipkens (Germany) Mona Barthel
9 Apr	Ladies Open Lugano; Lugano, Switzerland; WTA International; Clay (red) – $250,000 – 32S/24Q/16D; Singles – Doubles	(Belgium) Kirsten Flipkens (Belgium) Elise Mertens; 6–1, 6–3	(Belarus) Vera Lapko (Belarus) Aryna Sabalenka	(Switzerland) Stefanie Vögele (Belarus) Vera Lapko	(Germany) Tamara Korpatsch (Italy) Camila Giorgi (Belgium) Kirsten Flipkens (Germany) Mona Barthel
9 Apr	Copa Colsanitas; Bogotá, Colombia; WTA International; Clay (red) – $250,000 – 32S/24Q/16D; Singles – Doubles	(Slovakia) Anna Karolína Schmiedlová; 6–2, 6–4	(Spain) Lara Arruabarrena	(Romania) Ana Bogdan (Slovenia) Dalila Jakupović	(Chile) Daniela Seguel (Colombia) Emiliana Arango (Sweden) Johanna Larsson (Poland) Magda Linette
9 Apr	Copa Colsanitas; Bogotá, Colombia; WTA International; Clay (red) – $250,000 – 32S/24Q/16D; Singles – Doubles	(Slovenia) Dalila Jakupović (Russia) Irina Khromacheva; 6–3, 6–4	(Colombia) Mariana Duque Mariño (Argentina) Nadia Podoroska	(Romania) Ana Bogdan (Slovenia) Dalila Jakupović	(Chile) Daniela Seguel (Colombia) Emiliana Arango (Sweden) Johanna Larsson (Poland) Magda Linette
16 Apr	Fed Cup Semifinals; Stuttgart, Germany – Clay (red) (i); Aix-en-Provence, France – Clay (red) (i)	Semifinals winners: Czech Republic 4–1; United States 3–2	Semifinals losers: Germany; France		
23 Apr	Stuttgart Open; Stuttgart, Germany; WTA Premier; Clay (red) (i) – $816,000 – 28S/32Q/16D; Singles – Doubles	(Czech Republic) Karolína Plíšková; 7–6^{(7–2)}, 6–4	(United States) CoCo Vandeweghe	(France) Caroline Garcia (Estonia) Anett Kontaveit	(Romania) Simona Halep (Ukraine) Elina Svitolina (Latvia) Jeļena Ostapenko (Russia) Anastasia Pavlyuchenkova
23 Apr	Stuttgart Open; Stuttgart, Germany; WTA Premier; Clay (red) (i) – $816,000 – 28S/32Q/16D; Singles – Doubles	(United States) Raquel Atawo (Germany) Anna-Lena Grönefeld; 6–4, 6–7^{(5–7)}, [10–5]	(United States) Nicole Melichar (Czech Republic) Květa Peschke	(France) Caroline Garcia (Estonia) Anett Kontaveit	(Romania) Simona Halep (Ukraine) Elina Svitolina (Latvia) Jeļena Ostapenko (Russia) Anastasia Pavlyuchenkova
23 Apr	İstanbul Cup; Istanbul, Turkey; WTA International; Clay (red) – $250,000 – 32S/24Q/16D; Singles – Doubles	(France) Pauline Parmentier; 6–4, 3–6, 6–3	(Slovenia) Polona Hercog	(Romania) Irina-Camelia Begu (Greece) Maria Sakkari	(Denmark) Caroline Wozniacki (Croatia) Donna Vekić (Netherlands) Arantxa Rus (Russia) Svetlana Kuznetsova
23 Apr	İstanbul Cup; Istanbul, Turkey; WTA International; Clay (red) – $250,000 – 32S/24Q/16D; Singles – Doubles	(China) Liang Chen (China) Zhang Shuai; 6–4, 6–4	(Switzerland) Xenia Knoll (United Kingdom) Anna Smith	(Romania) Irina-Camelia Begu (Greece) Maria Sakkari	(Denmark) Caroline Wozniacki (Croatia) Donna Vekić (Netherlands) Arantxa Rus (Russia) Svetlana Kuznetsova
30 Apr	Prague Open; Prague, Czech Republic; WTA International; Clay (red) – $250,000 – 32S/32Q/16D; Singles – Doubles	(Czech Republic) Petra Kvitová; 4–6, 6–2, 6–3	(Romania) Mihaela Buzărnescu	(Italy) Camila Giorgi (China) Zhang Shuai	(Czech Republic) Kristýna Plíšková (Australia) Samantha Stosur (Italy) Jasmine Paolini (Czech Republic) Kateřina Siniaková
30 Apr	Prague Open; Prague, Czech Republic; WTA International; Clay (red) – $250,000 – 32S/32Q/16D; Singles – Doubles	(United States) Nicole Melichar (Czech Republic) Květa Peschke; 6–4, 6–2	(Romania) Mihaela Buzărnescu (Belarus) Lidziya Marozava	(Italy) Camila Giorgi (China) Zhang Shuai	(Czech Republic) Kristýna Plíšková (Australia) Samantha Stosur (Italy) Jasmine Paolini (Czech Republic) Kateřina Siniaková
30 Apr	Morocco Open; Rabat, Morocco; WTA International; Clay (red) – $250,000 – 32S/32Q/16D; Singles – Doubles	(Belgium) Elise Mertens; 6–2, 7–6^{(7–4)}	(Australia) Ajla Tomljanović	(Chinese Taipei) Hsieh Su-wei (Serbia) Aleksandra Krunić	(Italy) Sara Errani (Ukraine) Katarina Zavatska (Croatia) Jana Fett (Spain) Paula Badosa Gibert
30 Apr	Morocco Open; Rabat, Morocco; WTA International; Clay (red) – $250,000 – 32S/32Q/16D; Singles – Doubles	(Russia) Anna Blinkova (Romania) Raluca Olaru; 6–4, 6–4	(Spain) Georgina García Pérez (Hungary) Fanny Stollár	(Chinese Taipei) Hsieh Su-wei (Serbia) Aleksandra Krunić	(Italy) Sara Errani (Ukraine) Katarina Zavatska (Croatia) Jana Fett (Spain) Paula Badosa Gibert

=== May ===
Week	Tournament	Champions	Runners-up	Semifinalists	Quarterfinalists
7 May	Madrid Open; Madrid, Spain; WTA Premier Mandatory; Clay (red) – €6,685,828 – 64S/32Q/28D; Singles – Doubles	(Czech Republic) Petra Kvitová; 7–6^{(8–6)}, 4–6, 6–3	(Netherlands) Kiki Bertens	(Czech Republic) Karolína Plíšková (France) Caroline Garcia	(Romania) Simona Halep (Russia) Daria Kasatkina (Spain) Carla Suárez Navarro (Russia) Maria Sharapova
7 May	Madrid Open; Madrid, Spain; WTA Premier Mandatory; Clay (red) – €6,685,828 – 64S/32Q/28D; Singles – Doubles	(Russia) Ekaterina Makarova (Russia) Elena Vesnina; 2–6, 6–4, [10–8]	(Hungary) Tímea Babos (France) Kristina Mladenovic	(Czech Republic) Karolína Plíšková (France) Caroline Garcia	(Romania) Simona Halep (Russia) Daria Kasatkina (Spain) Carla Suárez Navarro (Russia) Maria Sharapova
14 May	Italian Open; Rome, Italy; WTA Premier 5 Clay (red) – $3,351,720 – 56S/32Q/28D; Singles – Doubles	(Ukraine) Elina Svitolina; 6–0, 6–4	(Romania) Simona Halep	(Russia) Maria Sharapova (Estonia) Anett Kontaveit	(France) Caroline Garcia (Latvia) Jeļena Ostapenko (Germany) Angelique Kerber (Denmark) Caroline Wozniacki
14 May	Italian Open; Rome, Italy; WTA Premier 5 Clay (red) – $3,351,720 – 56S/32Q/28D; Singles – Doubles	(Australia) Ashleigh Barty (Netherlands) Demi Schuurs; 6–3, 6–4	(Czech Republic) Andrea Sestini Hlaváčková (Czech Republic) Barbora Strýcová	(Russia) Maria Sharapova (Estonia) Anett Kontaveit	(France) Caroline Garcia (Latvia) Jeļena Ostapenko (Germany) Angelique Kerber (Denmark) Caroline Wozniacki
21 May	Internationaux de Strasbourg; Strasbourg, France; WTA International; Clay (red) – $250,000 – 32S/24Q/16D; Singles – Doubles	(Russia) Anastasia Pavlyuchenkova; 6–7^{(5–7)}, 7–6^{(7–3)}, 7–6^{(8–6)}	(Slovakia) Dominika Cibulková	(Australia) Ashleigh Barty (Romania) Mihaela Buzărnescu	(China) Wang Qiang (Kazakhstan) Zarina Diyas (Chinese Taipei) Hsieh Su-wei (Australia) Samantha Stosur
21 May	Internationaux de Strasbourg; Strasbourg, France; WTA International; Clay (red) – $250,000 – 32S/24Q/16D; Singles – Doubles	(Romania) Mihaela Buzărnescu (Romania) Raluca Olaru; 7–5, 7–5	(Ukraine) Nadiia Kichenok (Australia) Anastasia Rodionova	(Australia) Ashleigh Barty (Romania) Mihaela Buzărnescu	(China) Wang Qiang (Kazakhstan) Zarina Diyas (Chinese Taipei) Hsieh Su-wei (Australia) Samantha Stosur
21 May	Nuremberg Cup; Nürnberg, Germany; WTA International; Clay (red) – $250,000 – 32S/24Q/16D; Singles – Doubles	(Sweden) Johanna Larsson; 7–6^{(7–4)}, 6–4	(United States) Alison Riske	(Belgium) Kirsten Flipkens (Czech Republic) Kateřina Siniaková	(Romania) Sorana Cîrstea (Netherlands) Kiki Bertens (Hungary) Fanny Stollár (Czech Republic) Kristýna Plíšková
21 May	Nuremberg Cup; Nürnberg, Germany; WTA International; Clay (red) – $250,000 – 32S/24Q/16D; Singles – Doubles	(Netherlands) Demi Schuurs (Slovenia) Katarina Srebotnik; 3–6, 6–3, [10–7]	(Belgium) Kirsten Flipkens (Sweden) Johanna Larsson	(Belgium) Kirsten Flipkens (Czech Republic) Kateřina Siniaková	(Romania) Sorana Cîrstea (Netherlands) Kiki Bertens (Hungary) Fanny Stollár (Czech Republic) Kristýna Plíšková
28 May; 4 Jun	French Open; Paris, France; Grand Slam; Clay (red) – €18,392,000; 128S/96Q/64D/32X; Singles – Doubles – Mixed doubles	(Romania) Simona Halep; 3–6, 6–4, 6–1	(United States) Sloane Stephens	(Spain) Garbiñe Muguruza (United States) Madison Keys	(Germany) Angelique Kerber (Russia) Maria Sharapova (Kazakhstan) Yulia Putintseva (Russia) Daria Kasatkina
28 May; 4 Jun	French Open; Paris, France; Grand Slam; Clay (red) – €18,392,000; 128S/96Q/64D/32X; Singles – Doubles – Mixed doubles	(Czech Republic) Barbora Krejčíková (Czech Republic) Kateřina Siniaková; 6–3, 6–3	(Japan) Eri Hozumi (Japan) Makoto Ninomiya	(Spain) Garbiñe Muguruza (United States) Madison Keys	(Germany) Angelique Kerber (Russia) Maria Sharapova (Kazakhstan) Yulia Putintseva (Russia) Daria Kasatkina
28 May; 4 Jun	French Open; Paris, France; Grand Slam; Clay (red) – €18,392,000; 128S/96Q/64D/32X; Singles – Doubles – Mixed doubles	(Chinese Taipei) Latisha Chan (Croatia) Ivan Dodig; 6–1, 6–7^{(5–7)}, [10–8]	(Canada) Gabriela Dabrowski (Croatia) Mate Pavić	(Spain) Garbiñe Muguruza (United States) Madison Keys	(Germany) Angelique Kerber (Russia) Maria Sharapova (Kazakhstan) Yulia Putintseva (Russia) Daria Kasatkina

=== June ===
Week	Tournament	Champions	Runners-up	Semifinalists	Quarterfinalists
11 Jun	Nottingham Open; Nottingham, Great Britain; WTA International; Grass – $250,000 – 32S/24Q/16D; Singles – Doubles	(Australia) Ashleigh Barty; 6–3, 3–6, 6–4	(United Kingdom) Johanna Konta	(Japan) Naomi Osaka (Croatia) Donna Vekić	(United Kingdom) Katie Boulter (Romania) Mihaela Buzărnescu (Slovenia) Dalila Jakupović (Germany) Mona Barthel
11 Jun	Nottingham Open; Nottingham, Great Britain; WTA International; Grass – $250,000 – 32S/24Q/16D; Singles – Doubles	(Poland) Alicja Rosolska (United States) Abigail Spears; 6–3, 7–6^{(7–5)}	(Romania) Mihaela Buzărnescu (United Kingdom) Heather Watson	(Japan) Naomi Osaka (Croatia) Donna Vekić	(United Kingdom) Katie Boulter (Romania) Mihaela Buzărnescu (Slovenia) Dalila Jakupović (Germany) Mona Barthel
11 Jun	Rosmalen Grass Court Championships; Rosmalen, Netherlands; WTA International; Grass – $250,000 – 32S/24Q/16D; Singles – Doubles	(Serbia) Aleksandra Krunić; 6–7^{(0–7)}, 7–5, 6–1	(Belgium) Kirsten Flipkens	(United States) CoCo Vandeweghe (Slovakia) Viktória Kužmová	(United States) Alison Riske (Russia) Veronika Kudermetova (Belarus) Aryna Sabalenka (Germany) Antonia Lottner
11 Jun	Rosmalen Grass Court Championships; Rosmalen, Netherlands; WTA International; Grass – $250,000 – 32S/24Q/16D; Singles – Doubles	(Belgium) Elise Mertens (Netherlands) Demi Schuurs; 3–3, retired	(Netherlands) Kiki Bertens (Belgium) Kirsten Flipkens	(United States) CoCo Vandeweghe (Slovakia) Viktória Kužmová	(United States) Alison Riske (Russia) Veronika Kudermetova (Belarus) Aryna Sabalenka (Germany) Antonia Lottner
18 Jun	Birmingham Classic; Birmingham, Great Britain; WTA Premier; Grass – $936,128 – 32S/32Q/16D; Singles – Doubles	(Czech Republic) Petra Kvitová; 4–6, 6–1, 6–2	(Slovakia) Magdaléna Rybáriková	(Czech Republic) Barbora Strýcová (Romania) Mihaela Buzărnescu	(Ukraine) Lesia Tsurenko (Slovenia) Dalila Jakupović (Germany) Julia Görges (Ukraine) Elina Svitolina
18 Jun	Birmingham Classic; Birmingham, Great Britain; WTA Premier; Grass – $936,128 – 32S/32Q/16D; Singles – Doubles	(Hungary) Tímea Babos (France) Kristina Mladenovic; 4–6, 6–3, [10–8]	(Belgium) Elise Mertens (Netherlands) Demi Schuurs	(Czech Republic) Barbora Strýcová (Romania) Mihaela Buzărnescu	(Ukraine) Lesia Tsurenko (Slovenia) Dalila Jakupović (Germany) Julia Görges (Ukraine) Elina Svitolina
18 Jun	Mallorca Open; Santa Ponsa, Spain; WTA International; Grass – $250,000 – 32S/24Q/16D; Singles – Doubles	(Germany) Tatjana Maria; 6–4, 7–5	(Latvia) Anastasija Sevastova	(United States) Sofia Kenin (Australia) Samantha Stosur	(France) Caroline Garcia (Czech Republic) Lucie Šafářová (Australia) Ajla Tomljanović (United States) Alison Riske
18 Jun	Mallorca Open; Santa Ponsa, Spain; WTA International; Grass – $250,000 – 32S/24Q/16D; Singles – Doubles	(Slovenia) Andreja Klepač (Spain) María José Martínez Sánchez; 6–1, 3–6, [10–3]	(Czech Republic) Lucie Šafářová (Czech Republic) Barbora Štefková	(United States) Sofia Kenin (Australia) Samantha Stosur	(France) Caroline Garcia (Czech Republic) Lucie Šafářová (Australia) Ajla Tomljanović (United States) Alison Riske
25 Jun	Eastbourne International; Eastbourne, Great Britain; WTA Premier; Grass – $917,664 – 48S/24Q/16D; Singles – Doubles	(Denmark) Caroline Wozniacki; 7–5, 7–6^{(7–5)}	(Belarus) Aryna Sabalenka	(Germany) Angelique Kerber (Poland) Agnieszka Radwańska	(Australia) Ashleigh Barty (Russia) Daria Kasatkina (Latvia) Jeļena Ostapenko (Czech Republic) Karolína Plíšková
25 Jun	Eastbourne International; Eastbourne, Great Britain; WTA Premier; Grass – $917,664 – 48S/24Q/16D; Singles – Doubles	(Canada) Gabriela Dabrowski (China) Xu Yifan; 6–3, 7–5	(Romania) Irina-Camelia Begu (Romania) Mihaela Buzărnescu	(Germany) Angelique Kerber (Poland) Agnieszka Radwańska	(Australia) Ashleigh Barty (Russia) Daria Kasatkina (Latvia) Jeļena Ostapenko (Czech Republic) Karolína Plíšková

=== July ===
Week	Tournament	Champions	Runners-up	Semifinalists	Quarterfinalists
2 Jul; 9 Jul	Wimbledon; London, Great Britain; Grand Slam; Grass – £15,950,500; 128S/96Q/64D/16Q/48X; Singles – Doubles – Mixed doubles	(Germany) Angelique Kerber; 6–3, 6–3	(United States) Serena Williams	(Latvia) Jeļena Ostapenko (Germany) Julia Görges	(Slovakia) Dominika Cibulková (Russia) Daria Kasatkina (Netherlands) Kiki Bertens (Italy) Camila Giorgi
2 Jul; 9 Jul	Wimbledon; London, Great Britain; Grand Slam; Grass – £15,950,500; 128S/96Q/64D/16Q/48X; Singles – Doubles – Mixed doubles	(Czech Republic) Barbora Krejčíková (Czech Republic) Kateřina Siniaková; 6–4, 4–6, 6–0	(United States) Nicole Melichar (Czech Republic) Květa Peschke	(Latvia) Jeļena Ostapenko (Germany) Julia Görges	(Slovakia) Dominika Cibulková (Russia) Daria Kasatkina (Netherlands) Kiki Bertens (Italy) Camila Giorgi
2 Jul; 9 Jul	Wimbledon; London, Great Britain; Grand Slam; Grass – £15,950,500; 128S/96Q/64D/16Q/48X; Singles – Doubles – Mixed doubles	(Austria) Alexander Peya (United States) Nicole Melichar; 7–6^{(7–1)}, 6–3	(United Kingdom) Jamie Murray (Belarus) Victoria Azarenka	(Latvia) Jeļena Ostapenko (Germany) Julia Görges	(Slovakia) Dominika Cibulková (Russia) Daria Kasatkina (Netherlands) Kiki Bertens (Italy) Camila Giorgi
16 Jul	Bucharest Open; Bucharest, Romania; WTA International; Clay (red) – $250,000 – 32S/32Q/16D; Singles – Doubles	(Latvia) Anastasija Sevastova; 7–6^{(7–4)}, 6–2	(Croatia) Petra Martić	(Slovenia) Polona Hercog (Romania) Mihaela Buzărnescu	(Romania) Sorana Cîrstea (Tunisia) Ons Jabeur (Germany) Laura Siegemund (China) Wang Yafan
16 Jul	Bucharest Open; Bucharest, Romania; WTA International; Clay (red) – $250,000 – 32S/32Q/16D; Singles – Doubles	(Romania) Irina-Camelia Begu (Romania) Andreea Mitu; 6–3, 6–4	(Montenegro) Danka Kovinić (Belgium) Maryna Zanevska	(Slovenia) Polona Hercog (Romania) Mihaela Buzărnescu	(Romania) Sorana Cîrstea (Tunisia) Ons Jabeur (Germany) Laura Siegemund (China) Wang Yafan
16 Jul	Ladies Championship Gstaad; Gstaad, Switzerland; WTA International; Clay (red) – $250,000 – 32S/24Q/16D; Singles – Doubles	(France) Alizé Cornet; 6–4, 7–6^{(8–6)}	(Luxembourg) Mandy Minella	(Canada) Eugenie Bouchard (Czech Republic) Markéta Vondroušová	(Australia) Samantha Stosur (Russia) Veronika Kudermetova (Russia) Evgeniya Rodina (Spain) Sara Sorribes Tormo
16 Jul	Ladies Championship Gstaad; Gstaad, Switzerland; WTA International; Clay (red) – $250,000 – 32S/24Q/16D; Singles – Doubles	(Chile) Alexa Guarachi (United States) Desirae Krawczyk; 4–6, 6–4, [10–6]	(Spain) Lara Arruabarrena (Switzerland) Timea Bacsinszky	(Canada) Eugenie Bouchard (Czech Republic) Markéta Vondroušová	(Australia) Samantha Stosur (Russia) Veronika Kudermetova (Russia) Evgeniya Rodina (Spain) Sara Sorribes Tormo
23 Jul	Moscow River Cup; Moscow, Russia; WTA International; Clay – $750,000 – 32S/24Q/16D; Singles – Doubles	(Serbia) Olga Danilović; 7–5, 6–7^{(1–7)}, 6–4	(Russia) Anastasia Potapova	(Belarus) Aliaksandra Sasnovich (Slovenia) Tamara Zidanšek	(Germany) Julia Görges (Latvia) Anastasija Sevastova (Russia) Valentyna Ivakhnenko (Germany) Laura Siegemund
23 Jul	Moscow River Cup; Moscow, Russia; WTA International; Clay – $750,000 – 32S/24Q/16D; Singles – Doubles	(Russia) Anastasia Potapova (Russia) Vera Zvonareva; 6–0, 6–3	(Russia) Alexandra Panova (Kazakhstan) Galina Voskoboeva	(Belarus) Aliaksandra Sasnovich (Slovenia) Tamara Zidanšek	(Germany) Julia Görges (Latvia) Anastasija Sevastova (Russia) Valentyna Ivakhnenko (Germany) Laura Siegemund
23 Jul	Jiangxi Open; Nanchang, China; WTA International; Hard – $250,000 – 32S/24Q/16D; Singles – Doubles	(China) Wang Qiang; 7–5, 4–0 ret.	(China) Zheng Saisai	(China) Zhu Lin (Poland) Magda Linette	(China) Zhang Shuai (China) Xun Fangying (Chinese Taipei) Liang En-shuo (China) Liu Fangzhou
23 Jul	Jiangxi Open; Nanchang, China; WTA International; Hard – $250,000 – 32S/24Q/16D; Singles – Doubles	(China) Jiang Xinyu (China) Tang Qianhui; 6–4, 6–4	(China) Lu Jingjing (China) You Xiaodi	(China) Zhu Lin (Poland) Magda Linette	(China) Zhang Shuai (China) Xun Fangying (Chinese Taipei) Liang En-shuo (China) Liu Fangzhou
30 Jul	Silicon Valley Classic; San Jose, United States; WTA Premier; Hard – $799,000 – 28S/16Q/16D; Singles – Doubles	(Romania) Mihaela Buzărnescu; 6–1, 6–0	(Greece) Maria Sakkari	(United States) Danielle Collins (Belgium) Elise Mertens	(Belarus) Victoria Azarenka (United States) Venus Williams (United Kingdom) Johanna Konta (Australia) Ajla Tomljanović
30 Jul	Silicon Valley Classic; San Jose, United States; WTA Premier; Hard – $799,000 – 28S/16Q/16D; Singles – Doubles	(Chinese Taipei) Latisha Chan (Czech Republic) Květa Peschke; 6–4, 6–1	(Ukraine) Lyudmyla Kichenok (Ukraine) Nadiia Kichenok	(United States) Danielle Collins (Belgium) Elise Mertens	(Belarus) Victoria Azarenka (United States) Venus Williams (United Kingdom) Johanna Konta (Australia) Ajla Tomljanović
30 Jul	Washington Open; Washington, D.C., United States; WTA International; Hard – $250,000 – 32S/16Q/16D; Singles – Doubles	(Russia) Svetlana Kuznetsova; 4–6, 7–6^{(9–7)}, 6–2	(Croatia) Donna Vekić	(China) Zheng Saisai (Germany) Andrea Petkovic	(United States) Allie Kiick (Poland) Magda Linette (Kazakhstan) Yulia Putintseva (Switzerland) Belinda Bencic
30 Jul	Washington Open; Washington, D.C., United States; WTA International; Hard – $250,000 – 32S/16Q/16D; Singles – Doubles	(China) Han Xinyun (Croatia) Darija Jurak; 6–3, 6–2	(Chile) Alexa Guarachi (New Zealand) Erin Routliffe	(China) Zheng Saisai (Germany) Andrea Petkovic	(United States) Allie Kiick (Poland) Magda Linette (Kazakhstan) Yulia Putintseva (Switzerland) Belinda Bencic

=== August ===
Week	Tournament	Champions	Runners-up	Semifinalists	Quarterfinalists
6 Aug	Canadian Open; Montreal, Canada; WTA Premier 5 Hard – $2,820,000 – 56S/48Q/28D; Singles – Doubles	(Romania) Simona Halep; 7–6^{(8–6)}, 3–6, 6–4	(United States) Sloane Stephens	(Australia) Ashleigh Barty (Ukraine) Elina Svitolina	(France) Caroline Garcia (Netherlands) Kiki Bertens (Latvia) Anastasija Sevastova (Belgium) Elise Mertens
6 Aug	Canadian Open; Montreal, Canada; WTA Premier 5 Hard – $2,820,000 – 56S/48Q/28D; Singles – Doubles	(Australia) Ashleigh Barty (Netherlands) Demi Schuurs; 4–6, 6–3, [10–8]	(Chinese Taipei) Latisha Chan (Russia) Ekaterina Makarova	(Australia) Ashleigh Barty (Ukraine) Elina Svitolina	(France) Caroline Garcia (Netherlands) Kiki Bertens (Latvia) Anastasija Sevastova (Belgium) Elise Mertens
13 Aug	Cincinnati Open; Mason, United States; WTA Premier 5 Hard – $2,874,299 – 56S/32Q/28D; Singles – Doubles	(Netherlands) Kiki Bertens; 2–6, 7–6^{(8–6)}, 6–2	(Romania) Simona Halep	(Belarus) Aryna Sabalenka (Czech Republic) Petra Kvitová	(Ukraine) Lesia Tsurenko (United States) Madison Keys (Belgium) Elise Mertens (Ukraine) Elina Svitolina
13 Aug	Cincinnati Open; Mason, United States; WTA Premier 5 Hard – $2,874,299 – 56S/32Q/28D; Singles – Doubles	(Czech Republic) Lucie Hradecká (Russia) Ekaterina Makarova; 6–2, 7–5	(Belgium) Elise Mertens (Netherlands) Demi Schuurs	(Belarus) Aryna Sabalenka (Czech Republic) Petra Kvitová	(Ukraine) Lesia Tsurenko (United States) Madison Keys (Belgium) Elise Mertens (Ukraine) Elina Svitolina
20 Aug	Connecticut Open; New Haven, United States; WTA Premier; Hard – $799,000 – 30S/48Q/16D; Singles – Doubles	(Belarus) Aryna Sabalenka; 6–1, 6–4	(Spain) Carla Suárez Navarro	(Germany) Julia Görges (Puerto Rico) Monica Puig	(Switzerland) Belinda Bencic (Russia) Ekaterina Makarova (Czech Republic) Petra Kvitová (France) Caroline Garcia
20 Aug	Connecticut Open; New Haven, United States; WTA Premier; Hard – $799,000 – 30S/48Q/16D; Singles – Doubles	(Czech Republic) Andrea Sestini Hlaváčková (Czech Republic) Barbora Strýcová; 6–4, 6–7^{(7–9)}, [10–4]	(Chinese Taipei) Hsieh Su-wei (Germany) Laura Siegemund	(Germany) Julia Görges (Puerto Rico) Monica Puig	(Switzerland) Belinda Bencic (Russia) Ekaterina Makarova (Czech Republic) Petra Kvitová (France) Caroline Garcia
27 Aug; 3 Sep	US Open; New York City, United States; Grand Slam; Hard – $25,282,920; 128S/128Q/64D/32X; Singles – Doubles – Mixed doubles	(Japan) Naomi Osaka; 6–2, 6–4	(United States) Serena Williams	(Latvia) Anastasija Sevastova (United States) Madison Keys	(Czech Republic) Karolína Plíšková (United States) Sloane Stephens (Spain) Carla Suárez Navarro (Ukraine) Lesia Tsurenko
27 Aug; 3 Sep	US Open; New York City, United States; Grand Slam; Hard – $25,282,920; 128S/128Q/64D/32X; Singles – Doubles – Mixed doubles	(Australia) Ashleigh Barty (United States) CoCo Vandeweghe; 3–6, 7–6^{(7–2)}, 7–6^{(8–6)}	(Hungary) Tímea Babos (France) Kristina Mladenovic	(Latvia) Anastasija Sevastova (United States) Madison Keys	(Czech Republic) Karolína Plíšková (United States) Sloane Stephens (Spain) Carla Suárez Navarro (Ukraine) Lesia Tsurenko
27 Aug; 3 Sep	US Open; New York City, United States; Grand Slam; Hard – $25,282,920; 128S/128Q/64D/32X; Singles – Doubles – Mixed doubles	(United States) Bethanie Mattek-Sands (United Kingdom) Jamie Murray; 2–6, 6–3, [11–9]	(Poland) Alicja Rosolska (Croatia) Nikola Mektić	(Latvia) Anastasija Sevastova (United States) Madison Keys	(Czech Republic) Karolína Plíšková (United States) Sloane Stephens (Spain) Carla Suárez Navarro (Ukraine) Lesia Tsurenko

=== September ===
Week	Tournament	Champions	Runners-up	Semifinalists	Quarterfinalists
10 Sep	Tournoi de Québec; Quebec City, Canada; WTA International; Carpet (i) – $250,000 – 32S/24Q/16D; Singles – Doubles	(France) Pauline Parmentier; 7–5, 6–2	(United States) Jessica Pegula	(United Kingdom) Heather Watson (United States) Sofia Kenin	(United States) Varvara Lepchenko (Canada) Rebecca Marino (Puerto Rico) Monica Puig (Croatia) Petra Martić
10 Sep	Tournoi de Québec; Quebec City, Canada; WTA International; Carpet (i) – $250,000 – 32S/24Q/16D; Singles – Doubles	(United States) Asia Muhammad (United States) Maria Sanchez; 6–4, 6–3	(Croatia) Darija Jurak (Switzerland) Xenia Knoll	(United Kingdom) Heather Watson (United States) Sofia Kenin	(United States) Varvara Lepchenko (Canada) Rebecca Marino (Puerto Rico) Monica Puig (Croatia) Petra Martić
10 Sep	Japan Open; Hiroshima, Japan; WTA International; Hard – $250,000 – 32S/32Q/16D; Singles – Doubles	(Chinese Taipei) Hsieh Su-wei; 6–2, 6–2	(United States) Amanda Anisimova	(China) Zhang Shuai (China) Wang Qiang	(Kazakhstan) Zarina Diyas (Slovakia) Anna Karolína Schmiedlová (Poland) Magda Linette (Australia) Ajla Tomljanović
10 Sep	Japan Open; Hiroshima, Japan; WTA International; Hard – $250,000 – 32S/32Q/16D; Singles – Doubles	(Japan) Eri Hozumi (China) Zhang Shuai; 6–2, 6–4	(Japan) Miyu Kato (Japan) Makoto Ninomiya	(China) Zhang Shuai (China) Wang Qiang	(Kazakhstan) Zarina Diyas (Slovakia) Anna Karolína Schmiedlová (Poland) Magda Linette (Australia) Ajla Tomljanović
17 Sep	Pan Pacific Open; Tokyo, Japan; WTA Premier $799,000 – Hard (i) – 28S/24Q/16D; Singles – Doubles	(Czech Republic) Karolína Plíšková; 6–4, 6–4	(Japan) Naomi Osaka	(Italy) Camila Giorgi (Croatia) Donna Vekić	(Belarus) Victoria Azarenka (Czech Republic) Barbora Strýcová (United States) Alison Riske (France) Caroline Garcia
17 Sep	Pan Pacific Open; Tokyo, Japan; WTA Premier $799,000 – Hard (i) – 28S/24Q/16D; Singles – Doubles	(Japan) Miyu Kato (Japan) Makoto Ninomiya; 6–4, 6–4	(Czech Republic) Andrea Sestini Hlaváčková (Czech Republic) Barbora Strýcová	(Italy) Camila Giorgi (Croatia) Donna Vekić	(Belarus) Victoria Azarenka (Czech Republic) Barbora Strýcová (United States) Alison Riske (France) Caroline Garcia
17 Sep	Korea Open; Seoul, South Korea; WTA International; Hard – $250,000 – 32S/24Q/16D; Singles – Doubles	(Netherlands) Kiki Bertens; 7–6^{(7–2)}, 4–6, 6–2	(Australia) Ajla Tomljanović	(Chinese Taipei) Hsieh Su-wei (Greece) Maria Sakkari	(Russia) Ekaterina Alexandrova (Luxembourg) Mandy Minella (Romania) Irina-Camelia Begu (Russia) Evgeniya Rodina
17 Sep	Korea Open; Seoul, South Korea; WTA International; Hard – $250,000 – 32S/24Q/16D; Singles – Doubles	(South Korea) Choi Ji-hee (South Korea) Han Na-lae; 6–3, 6–2	(Chinese Taipei) Hsieh Shu-ying (Chinese Taipei) Hsieh Su-wei	(Chinese Taipei) Hsieh Su-wei (Greece) Maria Sakkari	(Russia) Ekaterina Alexandrova (Luxembourg) Mandy Minella (Romania) Irina-Camelia Begu (Russia) Evgeniya Rodina
17 Sep	Guangzhou Open; Guangzhou, China; WTA International; Hard – $250,000 – 32S/24Q/16D; Singles – Doubles	(China) Wang Qiang; 6–1, 6–2	(Kazakhstan) Yulia Putintseva	(United States) Bernarda Pera (Germany) Andrea Petkovic	(Ukraine) Kateryna Kozlova (Serbia) Aleksandra Krunić (France) Fiona Ferro (Belarus) Vera Lapko
17 Sep	Guangzhou Open; Guangzhou, China; WTA International; Hard – $250,000 – 32S/24Q/16D; Singles – Doubles	(Australia) Monique Adamczak (Australia) Jessica Moore; 4–6, 7–5, [10–4]	(Montenegro) Danka Kovinić (Belarus) Vera Lapko	(United States) Bernarda Pera (Germany) Andrea Petkovic	(Ukraine) Kateryna Kozlova (Serbia) Aleksandra Krunić (France) Fiona Ferro (Belarus) Vera Lapko
24 Sep	Wuhan Open; Wuhan, China; WTA Premier 5 $2,746,000 – Hard – 56S/32Q/28D; Singles – Doubles	(Belarus) Aryna Sabalenka; 6–3, 6–3	(Estonia) Anett Kontaveit	(Australia) Ashleigh Barty (China) Wang Qiang	(Slovakia) Dominika Cibulková (Russia) Anastasia Pavlyuchenkova (Czech Republic) Kateřina Siniaková (Puerto Rico) Monica Puig
24 Sep	Wuhan Open; Wuhan, China; WTA Premier 5 $2,746,000 – Hard – 56S/32Q/28D; Singles – Doubles	(Belgium) Elise Mertens (Netherlands) Demi Schuurs; 6–3, 6–3	(Czech Republic) Andrea Sestini Hlaváčková (Czech Republic) Barbora Strýcová	(Australia) Ashleigh Barty (China) Wang Qiang	(Slovakia) Dominika Cibulková (Russia) Anastasia Pavlyuchenkova (Czech Republic) Kateřina Siniaková (Puerto Rico) Monica Puig
24 Sep	Tashkent Open; Tashkent, Uzbekistan; WTA International; Hard – $250,000 – 32S/16Q/16D; Singles – Doubles	(Russia) Margarita Gasparyan; 6–2, 6–1	(Russia) Anastasia Potapova	(Ukraine) Kateryna Kozlova (Germany) Mona Barthel	(Slovakia) Anna Karolína Schmiedlová (Slovenia) Dalila Jakupović (Hungary) Fanny Stollár (Belarus) Vera Lapko
24 Sep	Tashkent Open; Tashkent, Uzbekistan; WTA International; Hard – $250,000 – 32S/16Q/16D; Singles – Doubles	(Serbia) Olga Danilović (Slovenia) Tamara Zidanšek; 7–5, 6–3	(Romania) Irina-Camelia Begu (Romania) Raluca Olaru	(Ukraine) Kateryna Kozlova (Germany) Mona Barthel	(Slovakia) Anna Karolína Schmiedlová (Slovenia) Dalila Jakupović (Hungary) Fanny Stollár (Belarus) Vera Lapko

=== October ===
Week	Tournament	Champions	Runners-up	Semifinalists	Quarterfinalists
1 Oct	China Open; Beijing, China; WTA Premier Mandatory; Hard – $8,285,274 – 60S/32Q/28D; Singles – Doubles	(Denmark) Caroline Wozniacki; 6–3, 6–3	(Latvia) Anastasija Sevastova	(Japan) Naomi Osaka (China) Wang Qiang	(Slovakia) Dominika Cibulková (China) Zhang Shuai (Belarus) Aryna Sabalenka (Czech Republic) Kateřina Siniaková
1 Oct	China Open; Beijing, China; WTA Premier Mandatory; Hard – $8,285,274 – 60S/32Q/28D; Singles – Doubles	(Czech Republic) Andrea Sestini Hlaváčková (Czech Republic) Barbora Strýcová; 4–6, 6–4, [10–8]	(Canada) Gabriela Dabrowski (China) Xu Yifan	(Japan) Naomi Osaka (China) Wang Qiang	(Slovakia) Dominika Cibulková (China) Zhang Shuai (Belarus) Aryna Sabalenka (Czech Republic) Kateřina Siniaková
8 Oct	Tianjin Open; Tianjin, China; WTA International; Hard – $750,000 – 32S/24Q/16D; Singles – Doubles	(France) Caroline Garcia; 7–6^{(9–7)}, 6–3	(Czech Republic) Karolína Plíšková	(Switzerland) Timea Bacsinszky (Chinese Taipei) Hsieh Su-wei	(United Kingdom) Katie Boulter (Belarus) Aryna Sabalenka (Belgium) Elise Mertens (Croatia) Petra Martić
8 Oct	Tianjin Open; Tianjin, China; WTA International; Hard – $750,000 – 32S/24Q/16D; Singles – Doubles	(United States) Nicole Melichar (Czech Republic) Květa Peschke; 6–4, 6–2	(Australia) Monique Adamczak (Australia) Jessica Moore	(Switzerland) Timea Bacsinszky (Chinese Taipei) Hsieh Su-wei	(United Kingdom) Katie Boulter (Belarus) Aryna Sabalenka (Belgium) Elise Mertens (Croatia) Petra Martić
8 Oct	Hong Kong Open; Hong Kong; WTA International; Hard – $750,000 – 32S/24Q/16D; Singles – Doubles	(Ukraine) Dayana Yastremska; 6–2, 6–1	(China) Wang Qiang	(Spain) Garbiñe Muguruza (China) Zhang Shuai	(Ukraine) Elina Svitolina (Thailand) Luksika Kumkhum (Slovakia) Kristína Kučová (Australia) Daria Gavrilova
8 Oct	Hong Kong Open; Hong Kong; WTA International; Hard – $750,000 – 32S/24Q/16D; Singles – Doubles	(Australia) Samantha Stosur (China) Zhang Shuai; 6–4, 6–4	(Japan) Shuko Aoyama (Belarus) Lidziya Marozava	(Spain) Garbiñe Muguruza (China) Zhang Shuai	(Ukraine) Elina Svitolina (Thailand) Luksika Kumkhum (Slovakia) Kristína Kučová (Australia) Daria Gavrilova
8 Oct	Linz Open; Linz, Austria; WTA International; Hard (i) – $250,000 – 32S/24Q/16D; Singles – Doubles	(Italy) Camila Giorgi; 6–3, 6–1	(Russia) Ekaterina Alexandrova	(Germany) Andrea Petkovic (Belgium) Alison Van Uytvanck	(France) Kristina Mladenovic (Russia) Anastasia Pavlyuchenkova (Czech Republic) Barbora Strýcová (Russia) Margarita Gasparyan
8 Oct	Linz Open; Linz, Austria; WTA International; Hard (i) – $250,000 – 32S/24Q/16D; Singles – Doubles	(Belgium) Kirsten Flipkens (Sweden) Johanna Larsson; 4–6, 6–4, [10–5]	(United States) Raquel Atawo (Germany) Anna-Lena Grönefeld	(Germany) Andrea Petkovic (Belgium) Alison Van Uytvanck	(France) Kristina Mladenovic (Russia) Anastasia Pavlyuchenkova (Czech Republic) Barbora Strýcová (Russia) Margarita Gasparyan
15 Oct	Kremlin Cup; Moscow, Russia; WTA Premier; Hard (i) – $932,866 – 28S/32Q/16D; Singles – Doubles	(Russia) Daria Kasatkina; 2–6, 7–6^{(7–3)}, 6–4	(Tunisia) Ons Jabeur	(United Kingdom) Johanna Konta (Latvia) Anastasija Sevastova	(Russia) Anastasia Pavlyuchenkova (Belarus) Aliaksandra Sasnovich (Estonia) Anett Kontaveit (Russia) Vera Zvonareva
15 Oct	Kremlin Cup; Moscow, Russia; WTA Premier; Hard (i) – $932,866 – 28S/32Q/16D; Singles – Doubles	(Russia) Alexandra Panova (Germany) Laura Siegemund; 6–2, 7–6^{(7–2)}	(Croatia) Darija Jurak (Romania) Raluca Olaru	(United Kingdom) Johanna Konta (Latvia) Anastasija Sevastova	(Russia) Anastasia Pavlyuchenkova (Belarus) Aliaksandra Sasnovich (Estonia) Anett Kontaveit (Russia) Vera Zvonareva
15 Oct	Luxembourg Open; Kockelscheuer, Luxembourg; WTA International; Hard (i) – $250,000 – 32S/32Q/16D; Singles – Doubles	(Germany) Julia Görges; 6–4, 7–5	(Switzerland) Belinda Bencic	(Canada) Eugenie Bouchard (Ukraine) Dayana Yastremska	(Croatia) Donna Vekić (Germany) Andrea Petkovic (Belarus) Vera Lapko (Russia) Margarita Gasparyan
15 Oct	Luxembourg Open; Kockelscheuer, Luxembourg; WTA International; Hard (i) – $250,000 – 32S/32Q/16D; Singles – Doubles	(Belgium) Greet Minnen (Belgium) Alison Van Uytvanck; 7–6^{(7–3)}, 6–2	(Belarus) Vera Lapko (Luxembourg) Mandy Minella	(Canada) Eugenie Bouchard (Ukraine) Dayana Yastremska	(Croatia) Donna Vekić (Germany) Andrea Petkovic (Belarus) Vera Lapko (Russia) Margarita Gasparyan
22 Oct	WTA Finals; Singapore; Year-end championships Hard (i) – $7,000,000 – 8S (RR)/8D; Singles – Doubles	(Ukraine) Elina Svitolina; 3–6, 6–2, 6–2	(United States) Sloane Stephens	(Czech Republic) Karolína Plíšková (Netherlands) Kiki Bertens	Round robin (Germany) Angelique Kerber (Japan) Naomi Osaka (Denmark) Caroline Wozniacki (Czech Republic) Petra Kvitová
22 Oct	WTA Finals; Singapore; Year-end championships Hard (i) – $7,000,000 – 8S (RR)/8D; Singles – Doubles	(Hungary) Tímea Babos (France) Kristina Mladenovic; 6–4, 7–5	(Czech Republic) Barbora Krejčíková (Czech Republic) Kateřina Siniaková	(Czech Republic) Karolína Plíšková (Netherlands) Kiki Bertens	Round robin (Germany) Angelique Kerber (Japan) Naomi Osaka (Denmark) Caroline Wozniacki (Czech Republic) Petra Kvitová
29 Oct	WTA Elite Trophy; Zhuhai, China; Year-end championships Hard – $2,349,363 – 12S (RR)/6D (RR); Singles – Doubles	(Australia) Ashleigh Barty; 6–3, 6–4	(China) Wang Qiang	(Germany) Julia Görges (Spain) Garbiñe Muguruza	Round robin (United States) Madison Keys (Russia) Daria Kasatkina (Latvia) Anastasija Sevastova (China) Zhang Shuai (Belarus) Aryna Sabalenka (France) Caroline Garcia (Belgium) Elise Mertens (Estonia) Anett Kontaveit
29 Oct	WTA Elite Trophy; Zhuhai, China; Year-end championships Hard – $2,349,363 – 12S (RR)/6D (RR); Singles – Doubles	(Ukraine) Lyudmyla Kichenok (Ukraine) Nadiia Kichenok; 6–4, 3–6, [10–7]	(Japan) Shuko Aoyama (Belarus) Lidziya Marozava	(Germany) Julia Görges (Spain) Garbiñe Muguruza	Round robin (United States) Madison Keys (Russia) Daria Kasatkina (Latvia) Anastasija Sevastova (China) Zhang Shuai (Belarus) Aryna Sabalenka (France) Caroline Garcia (Belgium) Elise Mertens (Estonia) Anett Kontaveit

=== November ===
Week	Tournament	Champions	Runners-up	Semifinalists	Quarterfinalists
5 Nov	Fed Cup Final; Prague, Czech Republic – Hard (i)	Czech Republic; 3–0	United States		

== Statistical information ==
These tables present the number of singles (S), doubles (D), and mixed doubles (X) titles won by each player and each nation during the season, within all the tournament categories of the 2018 WTA Tour: the Grand Slam tournaments, the year-end championships (the WTA Tour Championships and the WTA Elite Trophy), the WTA Premier tournaments (Premier Mandatory, Premier 5, and regular Premier), and the WTA International tournaments. The players/nations are sorted by:

- total number of titles (a doubles title won by two players representing the same nation counts as only one win for the nation);
- cumulated importance of those titles (one Grand Slam win equalling two Premier Mandatory/Premier 5 wins, one year-end championships win equalling one-and-a-half Premier Mandatory/Premier 5 win, one Premier Mandatory/Premier 5 win equalling two Premier wins, one Premier win equalling two International wins);
- a singles > doubles > mixed doubles hierarchy;
- alphabetical order (by family names for players).

=== Key ===
Grand Slam tournaments
Year-end championships
WTA Premier Mandatory
WTA Premier 5
WTA Premier
WTA International

=== Titles won by player ===
Total	Player	Grand Slam			Year-end		Premier Mandatory		Premier 5		Premier		International		Total		
Total	Player	S	D	X	S	D	S	D	S	D	S	D	S	D	S	D	X
7	Demi Schuurs (NED)									● ● ●		●		● ● ●	0	7	0
7	Elise Mertens (BEL)									●			● ● ●	● ● ●	3	4	0
6	Ashleigh Barty (AUS)		●		●			●		● ●			●		2	4	0
5	Petra Kvitová (CZE)						●		●		● ●		●		5	0	0
4	Tímea Babos (HUN)		●			●						●	●		1	3	0
4	Gabriela Dabrowski (CAN)			●						●		● ●			0	3	1
4	Elina Svitolina (UKR)				●				●		● ●				4	0	0
4	Simona Halep (ROU)	●							●				●	●	3	1	0
4	Kiki Bertens (NED)								●		●	●	●		3	1	0
3	Kristina Mladenovic (FRA)		●			●						●			0	3	0
3	Caroline Wozniacki (DEN)	●					●				●				3	0	0
3	Barbora Strýcová (CZE)							● ●				●			0	3	0
3	Nicole Melichar (USA)			●										● ●	0	2	1
3	Květa Peschke (CZE)											●		● ●	0	3	0
3	Zhang Shuai (CHN)													● ● ●	0	3	0
2	Barbora Krejčíková (CZE)		● ●												0	2	0
2	Kateřina Siniaková (CZE)		● ●												0	2	0
2	Naomi Osaka (JPN)	●					●								2	0	0
2	CoCo Vandeweghe (USA)		●					●							0	2	0
2	Angelique Kerber (GER)	●									●				2	0	0
2	Latisha Chan (TPE)			●								●			0	1	1
2	Ekaterina Makarova (RUS)							●		●					0	2	0
2	Aryna Sabalenka (BLR)								●		●				2	0	0
2	Andrea Sestini Hlaváčková (CZE)							●				●			0	2	0
2	Hsieh Su-wei (TPE)							●					●		1	1	0
2	Karolína Plíšková (CZE)										● ●				2	0	0
2	Xu Yifan (CHN)											● ●			0	2	0
2	Mihaela Buzărnescu (ROU)										●			●	1	1	0
2	Katarina Srebotnik (SLO)											●		●	0	2	0
2	Vera Zvonareva (RUS)											●		●	0	2	0
2	Julia Görges (GER)												● ●		2	0	0
2	Pauline Parmentier (FRA)												● ●		2	0	0
2	Wang Qiang (CHN)												● ●		2	0	0
2	Olga Danilović (SRB)												●	●	1	1	0
2	Johanna Larsson (SWE)												●	●	1	1	0
2	Tatjana Maria (GER)												●	●	1	1	0
2	Alison Van Uytvanck (BEL)												●	●	1	1	0
2	Irina-Camelia Begu (ROU)													● ●	0	2	0
2	Kirsten Flipkens (BEL)													● ●	0	2	0
2	Raluca Olaru (ROU)													● ●	0	2	0
1	Bethanie Mattek-Sands (USA)			●											0	0	1
1	Lyudmyla Kichenok (UKR)					●									0	1	0
1	Nadiia Kichenok (UKR)					●									0	1	0
1	Sloane Stephens (USA)						●								1	0	0
1	Elena Vesnina (RUS)							●							0	1	0
1	Lucie Hradecká (CZE)									●					0	1	0
1	Jeļena Ostapenko (LAT)									●					0	1	0
1	Daria Kasatkina (RUS)										●				1	0	0
1	Raquel Atawo (USA)											●			0	1	0
1	Timea Bacsinszky (SUI)											●			0	1	0
1	Chan Hao-ching (TPE)											●			0	1	0
1	Anna-Lena Grönefeld (GER)											●			0	1	0
1	Miyu Kato (JPN)											●			0	1	0
1	Alla Kudryavtseva (RUS)											●			0	1	0
1	Makoto Ninomiya (JPN)											●			0	1	0
1	Alexandra Panova (RUS)											●			0	1	0
1	Laura Siegemund (GER)											●			0	1	0
1	Yang Zhaoxuan (CHN)											●			0	1	0
1	Alizé Cornet (FRA)												●		1	0	0
1	Caroline Garcia (FRA)												●		1	0	0
1	Margarita Gasparyan (RUS)												●		1	0	0
1	Camila Giorgi (ITA)												●		1	0	0
1	Aleksandra Krunić (SRB)												●		1	0	0
1	Svetlana Kuznetsova (RUS)												●		1	0	0
1	Garbiñe Muguruza (ESP)												●		1	0	0
1	Anastasia Pavlyuchenkova (RUS)												●		1	0	0
1	Anna Karolína Schmiedlová (SVK)												●		1	0	0
1	Anastasija Sevastova (LAT)												●		1	0	0
1	Lesia Tsurenko (UKR)												●		1	0	0
1	Dayana Yastremska (UKR)												●		1	0	0
1	Monique Adamczak (AUS)													●	0	1	0
1	Anna Blinkova (RUS)													●	0	1	0
1	Naomi Broady (GBR)													●	0	1	0
1	Choi Ji-hee (KOR)													●	0	1	0
1	Duan Yingying (CHN)													●	0	1	0
1	Sara Errani (ITA)													●	0	1	0
1	Alexa Guarachi (CHI)													●	0	1	0
1	Georgina García Pérez (ESP)													●	0	1	0
1	Han Na-lae (KOR)													●	0	1	0
1	Han Xinyun (CHN)													●	0	1	0
1	Eri Hozumi (JPN)													●	0	1	0
1	Dalila Jakupović (SLO)													●	0	1	0
1	Jiang Xinyu (CHN)													●	0	1	0
1	Darija Jurak (CRO)													●	0	1	0
1	Irina Khromacheva (RUS)													●	0	1	0
1	Andreja Klepač (SLO)													●	0	1	0
1	Desirae Krawczyk (USA)													●	0	1	0
1	Liang Chen (CHN)													●	0	1	0
1	María José Martínez Sánchez (ESP)													●	0	1	0
1	Greet Minnen (BEL)													●	0	1	0
1	Andreea Mitu (ROU)													●	0	1	0
1	Jessica Moore (AUS)													●	0	1	0
1	Asia Muhammad (USA)													●	0	1	0
1	Anastasia Potapova (RUS)													●	0	1	0
1	Alicja Rosolska (POL)													●	0	1	0
1	Maria Sanchez (USA)													●	0	1	0
1	Bibiane Schoofs (NED)													●	0	1	0
1	Sara Sorribes Tormo (ESP)													●	0	1	0
1	Abigail Spears (USA)													●	0	1	0
1	Fanny Stollár (HUN)													●	0	1	0
1	Samantha Stosur (AUS)													●	0	1	0
1	Tang Qianhui (CHN)													●	0	1	0
1	Wang Yafan (CHN)													●	0	1	0
1	Heather Watson (GBR)													●	0	1	0
1	Tamara Zidanšek (SLO)													●	0	1	0

=== Titles won by nation ===
Total	Nation	Grand Slam			Year-end		Premier Mandatory		Premier 5		Premier		International		Total		
Total	Nation	S	D	X	S	D	S	D	S	D	S	D	S	D	S	D	X
16	Czech Republic (CZE)		2				1	2	1	1	4	2	1	2	7	9	0
12	Russia (RUS)							1		1	1	3	3	3	4	8	0
11	United States (USA)		1	2			1	1				1		5	1	8	2
11	Netherlands (NED)								1	3	1	1	1	4	3	8	0
11	China (CHN)											3	2	6	2	9	0
10	Belgium (BEL)									1			4	5	4	6	0
8	Romania (ROU)	1							1		1		1	4	4	4	0
8	Germany (GER)	1									1	2	3	1	5	3	0
8	Australia (AUS)		1		1			1		2			1	2	2	6	0
7	France (FRA)		1			1						1	4		4	3	0
7	Ukraine (UKR)				1	1			1		2		2		6	1	0
5	Hungary (HUN)		1			1						1	1	1	1	4	0
5	Chinese Taipei (TPE)			1				1				2	1		1	3	1
5	Slovenia (SLO)											1		4	0	5	0
4	Canada (CAN)			1						1		2			0	3	1
4	Japan (JPN)	1					1					1		1	2	2	0
4	Spain (ESP)												1	3	1	3	0
3	Denmark (DEN)	1					1				1				3	0	0
3	Serbia (SRB)												2	1	2	1	0
2	Belarus (BLR)								1		1				2	0	0
2	Latvia (LAT)									1			1		1	1	0
2	Italy (ITA)												1	1	1	1	0
2	Sweden (SWE)												1	1	1	1	0
2	Great Britain (GBR)													2	0	2	0
1	Switzerland (SUI)											1			0	1	0
1	Slovakia (SVK)												1		1	0	0
1	Chile (CHI)													1	0	1	0
1	Croatia (CRO)													1	0	1	0
1	Poland (POL)													1	0	1	0
1	South Korea (KOR)													1	0	1	0

=== Titles information ===
The following players won their first main circuit title in singles, doubles, or mixed doubles:

Singles

- (Japan) Naomi Osaka – Indian Wells (draw)
- (Serbia) Aleksandra Krunić – Rosmalen (draw)
- (Germany) Tatjana Maria – Mallorca (draw)
- (Serbia) Olga Danilović – Moscow International (draw)
- (China) Wang Qiang – Nanchang (draw)
- (Romania) Mihaela Buzărnescu – San Jose (draw)
- (Belarus) Aryna Sabalenka – New Haven (draw)
- (Ukraine) Dayana Yastremska – Hong Kong (draw)

Doubles

- (Romania) Simona Halep – Shenzhen (draw)
- (Netherlands) Bibiane Schoofs – Auckland (draw)
- (Spain) Georgina García Pérez – Budapest (draw)
- (Hungary) Fanny Stollár – Budapest (draw)
- (United Kingdom) Naomi Broady – Monterrey (draw)
- (Spain) Sara Sorribes Tormo – Monterrey (draw)
- (Russia) Irina Khromacheva – Bogotá (draw)
- (Russia) Anna Blinkova – Rabat (draw)
- (Romania) Mihaela Buzărnescu – Strasbourg (draw)
- (Chile) Alexa Guarachi – Gstaad (draw)
- (United States) Desirae Krawczyk – Gstaad (draw)
- (Russia) Anastasia Potapova – Moscow International (draw)
- (South Korea) Choi Ji-hee – Seoul (draw)
- (South Korea) Han Na-lae – Seoul (draw)
- (Serbia) Olga Danilović – Tashkent (draw)
- (Slovenia) Tamara Zidanšek – Tashkent (draw)
- (Belgium) Greet Minnen – Luxembourg City (draw)
- (Belgium) Alison Van Uytvanck – Luxembourg City (draw)

Mixed doubles

- (Chinese Taipei) Latisha Chan – **French Open** (**draw**)
- (United States) Nicole Melichar – **Wimbledon** (**draw**)

The following players defended a main circuit title in singles, doubles, or mixed doubles:

Singles

- (Belgium) Elise Mertens – Hobart (draw)
- (Ukraine) Elina Svitolina – Dubai (draw), Rome (draw)
- (Ukraine) Lesia Tsurenko – Acapulco (draw)
- (Czech Republic) Petra Kvitová – Birmingham (draw)

Doubles

- (United States) Raquel Atawo – Stuttgart (draw)
- (Czech Republic) Květa Peschke – Prague (draw)
- (Romania) Irina-Camelia Begu – Bucharest (draw)
- (China) Jiang Xinyu – Nanchang (draw)
- (China) Tang Qianhui – Nanchang (draw)
- (Sweden) Johanna Larsson – Linz (draw)
- (Hungary) Tímea Babos – WTA Finals (draw)

=== Best ranking ===
The following players achieved their career high ranking in this season inside top 50 (in bold the players who entered the top 10 for the first time):

Singles

- (Germany) Carina Witthöft (reached place No. 48 on January 8)
- (Slovakia) Magdaléna Rybáriková (reached place No. 17 on March 5)
- (Latvia) Jeļena Ostapenko (reached place **No. 5** on March 19)
- (Czech Republic) Markéta Vondroušová (reached place No. 50 on March 19)
- (Serbia) Aleksandra Krunić (reached place No. 39 on June 18)
- **(United States) Sloane Stephens** (reached place **No. 3** on July 16)
- (Romania) Mihaela Buzărnescu (reached place No. 20 on August 6)
- (United States) Danielle Collins (reached place No. 35 on August 6)
- (Belgium) Alison Van Uytvanck (reached place No. 37 on August 13)
- **(Germany) Julia Görges** (reached place **No. 9** on August 20)
- (France) Caroline Garcia (reached place **No. 4** on September 10)
- (Ukraine) Lesia Tsurenko (reached place No. 26 on September 10)
- (Belarus) Aliaksandra Sasnovich (reached place No. 30 on September 10)
- (Greece) Maria Sakkari (reached place No. 29 on September 24)
- **(Japan) Naomi Osaka** (reached place **No. 4** on October 8)
- (Belarus) Aryna Sabalenka (reached place No. 11 on October 8)
- (Latvia) Anastasija Sevastova (reached place No. 11 on October 15)
- **(Netherlands) Kiki Bertens** (reached place **No. 9** on October 22)
- **(Russia) Daria Kasatkina** (reached place **No. 10** on October 22)
- (Estonia) Anett Kontaveit (reached place No. 20 on October 22)
- (Italy) Camila Giorgi (reached place No. 26 on October 22)
- (Czech Republic) Kateřina Siniaková (reached place No. 31 on October 22)
- (Croatia) Petra Martić (reached place No. 32 on October 22)
- (Croatia) Donna Vekić (reached place No. 34 on October 22)
- (Australia) Ajla Tomljanović (reached place No. 43 on October 22)
- (United States) Sofia Kenin (reached place No. 48 on October 29)
- (Australia) Ashleigh Barty (reached place No. 15 on November 5)
- (China) Wang Qiang (reached place No. 20 on November 5)
- (Belgium) Elise Mertens (reached place No. 12 on November 26)
- (China) Zheng Saisai (reached place No. 39 on November 26)

Doubles

- (Japan) Shuko Aoyama (reached place No. 27 on January 15)
- (Ukraine) Nadiia Kichenok (reached place No. 36 on January 29)
- (Serbia) Nina Stojanović (reached place No. 50 on February 5)
- (Australia) Monique Adamczak (reached place No. 44 on February 19)
- **(Canada) Gabriela Dabrowski** (reached place **No. 7** on March 19)
- **(China) Xu Yifan** (reached place **No. 9** on March 19)
- (Romania) Monica Niculescu (reached place No. 11 on April 2)
- (Netherlands) Kiki Bertens (reached place No. 16 on April 16)
- (Belgium) Kirsten Flipkens (reached place No. 35 on April 16)
- **(Australia) Ashleigh Barty** (reached place **No. 5** on May 21)
- (United Kingdom) Anna Smith (reached place No. 46 on May 21)
- (Russia) Ekaterina Makarova (reached place **No. 1** on June 11)
- (Russia) Elena Vesnina (reached place **No. 1** on June 11)
- (Hungary) Tímea Babos (reached place **No. 1** on July 16)
- (Slovenia) Andreja Klepač (reached place No. 12 on July 16)
- (China) Yang Zhaoxuan (reached place No. 20 on August 13)
- (United Kingdom) Heather Watson (reached place No. 42 on August 20)
- (United States) Kaitlyn Christian (reached place No. 49 on August 20)
- (Slovenia) Dalila Jakupović (reached place No. 38 on September 10)
- (Russia) Irina Khromacheva (reached place No. 45 on September 10)
- (Romania) Irina-Camelia Begu (reached place No. 22 on October 1)
- (Ukraine) Lyudmyla Kichenok (reached place No. 34 on October 1)
- (United States) Nicole Melichar (reached place No. 15 on October 8)
- (Belarus) Lidziya Marozava (reached place No. 36 on October 15)
- **(Czech Republic) Barbora Krejčíková** (reached place **No. 1** on October 22)
- **(Czech Republic) Kateřina Siniaková** (reached place **No. 1** on October 22)
- **(Netherlands) Demi Schuurs** (reached place **No. 7** on October 22)
- (Belgium) Elise Mertens (reached place No. 11 on October 22)
- (Japan) Makoto Ninomiya (reached place No. 20 on October 22)
- (Romania) Mihaela Buzărnescu (reached place No. 24 on October 22)
- (Poland) Alicja Rosolska (reached place No. 29 on October 22)
- (Czech Republic) Barbora Strýcová (reached place **No. 5** on October 29)
- (United States) CoCo Vandeweghe (reached place No. 14 on October 29)

== WTA rankings ==
These are the WTA rankings of the top 20 singles players, doubles players, and the top 10 doubles teams on the WTA Tour, at the current date of the 2018 season.

=== Singles ===
Final WTA Singles Race Rankings
#	Player	Points	Tourn
1	(Romania) Simona Halep	6,921	17
2	(Germany) Angelique Kerber	5,375	18
3	(Denmark) Caroline Wozniacki	5,086	18
4	(Japan) Naomi Osaka	4,740	19
5	(Czech Republic) Petra Kvitová	4,255	20
6	(United States) Sloane Stephens	3,943	19
7	(Ukraine) Elina Svitolina	3,850	18
8	(Czech Republic) Karolína Plíšková	3,840	22
9	(Netherlands) Kiki Bertens	3,710	24
10	(Russia) Daria Kasatkina	3,315	23
11	(Latvia) Anastasija Sevastova	3,185	22
12	(Belarus) Aryna Sabalenka	3,145	26
13	(Belgium) Elise Mertens	3,065	22
14	(Germany) Julia Görges	2,995	23
15	(United States) Serena Williams	2,976	10
16	(United States) Madison Keys	2,817	16
17	(Spain) Garbiñe Muguruza	2,725	22
18	(France) Caroline Garcia	2,600	22
19	(Australia) Ashleigh Barty	2,420	20
20	(Estonia) Anett Kontaveit	2,375	23

Champion

Player competed at the 2018 WTA Finals
Player withdrew from the 2018 WTA Finals

WTA Singles Year-End Rankings
#	Player	Points	#Trn	'17 Rk	High	Low	'17→'18
1	Simona Halep (ROU)	6,921	17	1	1	2	Steady
2	Angelique Kerber (GER)	5,875	19	21	2	22	▲19
3	Caroline Wozniacki (DEN)	5,586	19	3	1	3	Steady
4	Elina Svitolina (UKR)	5,350	19	6	3	7	▲2
5	Naomi Osaka (JPN)	5,115	20	68	4	72	▲63
6	Sloane Stephens (USA)	5,023	20	13	3	13	▲7
7	Petra Kvitová (CZE)	4,630	21	29	4	29	▲22
8	Karolína Plíšková (CZE)	4,465	23	4	5	9	▼4
9	Kiki Bertens (NED)	4,335	25	31	9	32	▲22
10	Daria Kasatkina (RUS)	3,415	24	21	10	25	▲14
11	Aryna Sabalenka (BLR)	3,245	27	78	11	96	▲67
12	Anastasija Sevastova (LAT)	3,240	23	16	11	21	▲4
13	Elise Mertens (BEL)	3,165	23	35	13	37	▲22
14	Julia Görges (GER)	3,055	24	14	9	14	Steady
15	Ashleigh Barty (AUS)	2,985	21	17	15	21	▲2
16	Serena Williams (USA)	2,976	10	22	15	NR	▲6
17	Madison Keys (USA)	2,976	17	19	10	20	▲2
18	Garbiñe Muguruza (ESP)	2,910	23	2	2	18	▼16
19	Caroline Garcia (FRA)	2,660	23	8	4	19	▼11
20	Wang Qiang (CHN)	2,485	24	45	20	85	▲25

==== Number 1 ranking ====
Holder	Date gained	Date forfeited
(Romania) Simona Halep	Year end 2017	28 January 2018
(Denmark) Caroline Wozniacki	29 January 2018	25 February 2018
(Romania) Simona Halep	26 February 2018	Year end 2018

=== Doubles ===
Final WTA Doubles Team Race Rankings
#	Team	Points	Move^{†}	Tourn
1	(Czech Republic) Barbora Krejčíková (Czech Republic) Kateřina Siniaková	6,815	Steady	14
2	(Hungary) Tímea Babos (France) Kristina Mladenovic	6,455	Steady	14
3	(Czech Republic) Andrea Sestini Hlaváčková (Czech Republic) Barbora Strýcová	4,795	Steady	14
4	(Canada) Gabriela Dabrowski (China) Xu Yifan	4,180	Steady	17
5	(Belgium) Elise Mertens (Netherlands) Demi Schuurs	4,025	Steady	14
6	(United States) Nicole Melichar (Czech Republic) Květa Peschke	3,705	Steady	22
7	(Slovenia) Andreja Klepač (Spain) María José Martínez Sánchez	3,505	Steady	20
8	(Australia) Ashleigh Barty (United States) CoCo Vandeweghe	3,237	Steady	7
9	(United States) Raquel Atawo (Germany) Anna-Lena Grönefeld	2,445	Steady	22
10	(Poland) Alicja Rosolska (United States) Abigail Spears	2,390	Steady	27

Champion

Player competed at the 2018 WTA Finals

WTA Doubles Year-End Rankings
#	Player	Points	Prev	Move^{‡}
1	Barbora Krejčíková (CZE)	7,775	13	▲12
1	Kateřina Siniaková (CZE)	7,775	54	▲53
3	Tímea Babos (HUN)	7,765	7	▲4
3	Kristina Mladenovic (FRA)	7,765	26	▲23
5	Barbora Strýcová (CZE)	6,535	15	▲10
6	Ekaterina Makarova (RUS)	6,205	3	▼3
7	Ashleigh Barty (AUS)	6,101	11	▲4
8	Demi Schuurs (NED)	5,925	45	▲37
9	Andrea Sestini Hlaváčková (CZE)	5,840	5	▼4
10	Gabriela Dabrowski (CAN)	5,085	18	▲8
11	Elise Mertens (BEL)	4,455	41	▲30
12	Xu Yifan (CHN)	4,370	16	▲4
13	Květa Peschke (CZE)	4,245	21	▲8
14	CoCo Vandeweghe (USA)	4,097	63	▲49
15	Nicole Melichar (USA)	3,960	39	▲24
16	Elena Vesnina (RUS)	3,725	3	▼13
17	Hsieh Su-wei (TPE)	3,705	32	▲15
18	María José Martínez Sánchez (SPA)	3,690	24	▲6
18	Andreja Klepač (SLO)	3,690	24	▲6
20	Makoto Ninomiya (JPN)	2,930	46	▲26

==== Number 1 ranking ====
Holder	Date gained	Date forfeited
(Chinese Taipei) Latisha Chan (Switzerland) Martina Hingis	Year end 2017	11 February 2018
(Chinese Taipei) Latisha Chan	12 February 2018	18 February 2018
(Chinese Taipei) Latisha Chan (Switzerland) Martina Hingis	19 February 2018	18 March 2018
(Chinese Taipei) Latisha Chan	19 March 2018	10 June 2018
(Russia) Ekaterina Makarova (Russia) Elena Vesnina	11 June 2018	15 July 2018
(Hungary) Tímea Babos	16 July 2018	12 August 2018
(Chinese Taipei) Latisha Chan	13 August 2018	19 August 2018
(Hungary) Tímea Babos	20 August 2018	21 October 2018
(Czech Republic) Barbora Krejčíková (Czech Republic) Kateřina Siniaková	22 October 2018	Year end 2018

== Prize money leaders ==
#	Player	Singles	Doubles	Mixed	Year-to-date
1	(Romania) Simona Halep	$6,314,890	$44,674	$0	$7,409,564
2	(Denmark) Caroline Wozniacki	$6,007,719	$0	$0	$6,657,719
3	(Japan) Naomi Osaka	$6,394,289	$0	$0	$6,394,289
4	(Ukraine) Elina Svitolina	$5,213,643	$16,366	$7,238	$5,737,247
5	(Germany) Angelique Kerber	$5,686,362	$0	$0	$5,686,362
6	(United States) Sloane Stephens	$5,028,342	$35,280	$4,477	$5,068,099
7	(United States) Serena Williams	$3,746,057	$24,113	$0	$3,770,170
8	(Czech Republic) Karolína Plíšková	$3,054,150	$34,900	$0	$3,539,050
9	(Czech Republic) Petra Kvitová	$3,301,389	$0	$0	$3,301,389
10	(Netherlands) Kiki Bertens	$3,023,982	$139,706	$0	$3,163,688
prize money given in US$; as of November 5, 2018

== Statistics leaders ==
as of December 4, 2018

Aces
	Player	Aces	Matches
1	(Germany) Julia Görges	492	68
2	(Czech Republic) Karolína Plíšková	393	70
3	(Netherlands) Kiki Bertens	325	69
4	(Australia) Ashleigh Barty	297	61
5	(Japan) Naomi Osaka	283	60
6	(Czech Republic) Kristýna Plíšková	276	36
7	(Belarus) Aryna Sabalenka	266	64
8	(Czech Republic) Petra Kvitová	259	60
9	(France) Caroline Garcia	247	61
10	(United Kingdom) Johanna Konta	231	49

Double faults
	Player	DFs	Matches
1	(Australia) Daria Gavrilova	385	49
2	(Czech Republic) Petra Kvitová	339	60
3	(Russia) Daria Kasatkina	321	66
4	(Belarus) Aryna Sabalenka	299	64
5	(Netherlands) Kiki Bertens	287	69
6	(Latvia) Jeļena Ostapenko	262	44
7	(Germany) Julia Görges	256	68
8	(Croatia) Donna Vekić	255	55
9	(France) Kristina Mladenovic	252	46
10	(Belgium) Elise Mertens	248	63

First-serve percentage
	Player	%	Matches
1	(Kazakhstan) Yulia Putintseva	69.0	30
2	(United States) Sloane Stephens	69.0	43
3	(Russia) Daria Kasatkina	68.1	55
4	(United States) Alison Riske	67.5	27
5	(France) Caroline Garcia	67.4	48
6	(Kazakhstan) Zarina Diyas	67.2	26
7	(Slovakia) Dominika Cibulková	66.8	37
8	(Russia) Svetlana Kuznetsova	66.7	22
9	(Belarus) Victoria Azarenka	66.5	26
10	(United States) Sofia Kenin	66.3	23

Second-serve percentage
	Player	%	Matches
1	(Latvia) Jeļena Ostapenko	45.8	44
2	(United States) CoCo Vandeweghe	45.2	25
3	(Slovenia) Polona Hercog	44.7	34
4	(Croatia) Donna Vekić	44.5	55
5	(Germany) Tatjana Maria	43.6	35
6	(Switzerland) Stefanie Vögele	43.2	26
7	(Slovakia) Magdaléna Rybáriková	43.1	34
8	(Czech Republic) Kristýna Plíšková	42.9	36
9	(Germany) Julia Görges	42.6	68
10	(Slovakia) Viktória Kužmová	42.4	27

First-serve points won
	Player	%	Matches
1	(United States) Serena Williams	74.4	24
2	(Germany) Julia Görges	73.8	68
3	(Australia) Ashleigh Barty	71.6	61
4	(Czech Republic) Kristýna Plíšková	71.2	36
5	(Japan) Naomi Osaka	70.1	60
6	(United States) Madison Keys	70.0	42
7	(United States) CoCo Vandeweghe	69.4	25
8	(Slovakia) Viktória Kužmová	69.3	27
9	(Belarus) Aryna Sabalenka	68.4	64
10	(Czech Republic) Karolína Plíšková	68.4	70

Second-serve points won
	Player	%	Matches
1	(Australia) Ashleigh Barty	52.2	61
2	(France) Caroline Garcia	51.3	61
3	(United States) Sloane Stephens	49.1	54
4	(Ukraine) Elina Svitolina	49.0	59
5	(Croatia) Petra Martić	48.9	43
6	(Italy) Camila Giorgi	48.5	45
7	(Spain) Carla Suárez Navarro	48.7	46
8	(Germany) Julia Görges	48.7	68
9	(Belarus) Aryna Sabalenka	48.4	64
10	(United Kingdom) Johanna Konta	48.3	49

Service points won
	Player	%	Matches
1	(United States) Serena Williams	63.8	24
2	(Australia) Ashleigh Barty	63.5	61
3	(Germany) Julia Görges	63.1	68
4	(United States) Madison Keys	62.1	42
5	(France) Caroline Garcia	60.7	61
6	(Japan) Naomi Osaka	60.7	60
7	(Belarus) Aryna Sabalenka	60.4	64
8	(Denmark) Caroline Wozniacki	60.3	58
9	(United Kingdom) Johanna Konta	60.3	49
10	(Ukraine) Elina Svitolina	60.2	59

Return points won
	Player	%	Matches
1	(Romania) Simona Halep	49.6	55
2	(Russia) Daria Kasatkina	48.3	66
3	(Germany) Angelique Kerber	47.6	63
4	(United States) Sloane Stephens	47.3	54
5	(Chinese Taipei) Hsieh Su-wei	47.0	49
6	(Russia) Maria Sharapova	46.9	31
7	(China) Wang Qiang	46.9	58
8	(Slovakia) Anna Karolína Schmiedlová	46.8	26
9	(Belgium) Elise Mertens	46.7	63
10	(Denmark) Caroline Wozniacki	46.4	58

Service games won
	Player	%	Matches
1	(United States) Serena Williams	79.1	24
2	(Australia) Ashleigh Barty	78.7	61
3	(Germany) Julia Görges	78.6	68
4	(Japan) Naomi Osaka	76.0	60
5	(United States) Madison Keys	75.8	37
6	(United Kingdom) Johanna Konta	75.5	49
7	(France) Caroline Garcia	75.0	61
8	(Ukraine) Elina Svitolina	74.2	59
9	(Czech Republic) Petra Kvitová	73.7	60
10	(Czech Republic) Karolína Plíšková	73.5	70

Return games won
	Player	%	Matches
1	(Romania) Simona Halep	48.5	55
2	(Russia) Daria Kasatkina	46.3	66
3	(United States) Sloane Stephens	44.2	54
4	(Germany) Angelique Kerber	43.9	63
5	(China) Wang Qiang	43.7	58
6	(Belgium) Elise Mertens	42.9	63
7	(Russia) Maria Sharapova	42.7	31
8	(Ukraine) Lesia Tsurenko	42.4	44
9	(Denmark) Caroline Wozniacki	42.1	58
10	(Netherlands) Kiki Bertens	42.1	69

Break points saved
	Player	%	Matches
1	(Germany) Julia Görges	63.5	68
2	(United Kingdom) Johanna Konta	63.3	49
3	(Slovenia) Polona Hercog	61.8	34
4	(Belarus) Aryna Sabalenka	61.6	64
5	(France) Caroline Garcia	61.2	61
6	(France) Pauline Parmentier	60.8	31
7	(Czech Republic) Petra Kvitová	60.3	60
8	(Croatia) Petra Martić	59.3	43
9	(Estonia) Anett Kontaveit	59.3	56
10	(Czech Republic) Karolína Plíšková	59.3	70

Break points converted
	Player	%	Matches
1	(Latvia) Jeļena Ostapenko	54.1	44
2	(Japan) Naomi Osaka	50.2	60
3	(Romania) Simona Halep	50.1	55
4	(Denmark) Caroline Wozniacki	49.8	58
5	(Netherlands) Kiki Bertens	49.8	69
6	(Ukraine) Kateryna Kozlova	49.5	26
7	(Germany) Angelique Kerber	48.8	63
8	(United States) Serena Williams	48.8	24
9	(United States) Sofia Kenin	48.7	31
10	(Chinese Taipei) Hsieh Su-wei	48.7	49

== Points distribution ==
Category	W	F	SF	QF	R16	R32	R64	R128	Q	Q3	Q2	Q1
Grand Slam (S)	2000	1300	780	430	240	130	70	10	40	30	20	2
Grand Slam (D)	2000	1300	780	430	240	130	10	–	40	–	–	–
WTA Finals (S)	1500*	1080*	750*	(+125 per round robin match; +125 per round robin win)								
WTA Finals (D)	1500	1080	750	375	–							
WTA Premier Mandatory (96S)	1000	650	390	215	120	65	35	10	30	–	20	2
WTA Premier Mandatory (64/60S)	1000	650	390	215	120	65	10	–	30	–	20	2
WTA Premier Mandatory (28/32D)	1000	650	390	215	120	10	–	–	–	–	–	–
WTA Premier 5 (56S, 64Q)	900	585	350	190	105	60	1	–	30	22	15	1
WTA Premier 5 (56S, 48/32Q)	900	585	350	190	105	60	1	–	30	-	20	1
WTA Premier 5 (28D)	900	585	350	190	105	1	–	–	–	–	–	–
WTA Premier 5 (16D)	900	585	350	190	1	-	–	–	–	–	–	–
WTA Premier (56S)	470	305	185	100	55	30	1	–	25	–	13	1
WTA Premier (32S)	470	305	185	100	55	1	–	–	25	18	13	1
WTA Premier (16D)	470	305	185	100	1	–	–	–	–	–	–	–
WTA Elite Trophy (S)	700*	440*	240*	(+40 per round robin match; +80 per round robin win)								
WTA International (32S, 32Q)	280	180	110	60	30	1	–	–	18	14	10	1
WTA International (32S, 24/16Q)	280	180	110	60	30	1	–	–	18	-	12	1
WTA International (16D)	280	180	110	60	1	–	–	–	–	–	–	–

S = singles players, D = doubles teams, Q = qualification players.
* Assumes undefeated round robin match record.

== WTA fan polls ==
=== Player of the month ===
Month	Winner	Other candidates
January	Simona Halep (ROU) (71%)	Caroline Wozniacki (DEN) (25%); Angelique Kerber (GER) (3%); Elina Svitolina (UKR) (1%)
February	Petra Kvitová (CZE) (78%)	Elina Svitolina (UKR) (19%); Garbiñe Muguruza (ESP) (3%)
March	Naomi Osaka (JPN) (52%)	Daria Kasatkina (RUS) (20%); Sloane Stephens (USA) (15%); Jeļena Ostapenko (LAT) (13%)
April	Karolína Plíšková (CZE)	Kiki Bertens (NED); Garbiñe Muguruza (ESP)
May	Simona Halep (ROU)	Petra Kvitová (CZE); Sloane Stephens (USA); Elina Svitolina (UKR)
June	Petra Kvitová (CZE)	Caroline Wozniacki (DEN); Ashleigh Barty (AUS)
July	Angelique Kerber (GER)	Mihaela Buzărnescu (ROU); Svetlana Kuznetsova (RUS); Anastasija Sevastova (LAT); Alizé Cornet (FRA)
August	Naomi Osaka (JPN)	Simona Halep (ROU); Serena Williams (USA); Kiki Bertens (NED)
September	Aryna Sabalenka (BLR)	Naomi Osaka (JPN); Karolína Plíšková (CZE)
October	Elina Svitolina (UKR)	Aryna Sabalenka (BLR); Caroline Wozniacki (DEN); Sloane Stephens (USA)

=== Breakthrough of the month ===
Month	Winner	Other candidates
January	Hsieh Su-wei (TPE) (42%)	Elise Mertens (BEL) (36%); Aliaksandra Sasnovich (BLR) (20%); Bernarda Pera (USA) (2%)
February	Daria Kasatkina (RUS) (50%)	Kateryna Kozlova (UKR) (35%); Viktória Kužmová (SVK) (15%)
March	Danielle Collins (USA) (79%)	Amanda Anisimova (USA) (21%)
April	Ana Bogdan (ROU)	Marta Kostyuk (UKR); Bernarda Pera (USA)
May	Mihaela Buzărnescu (ROU)	Daria Kasatkina (RUS); Anett Kontaveit (EST)
June	Tatjana Maria (GER)	Aleksandra Krunić (SRB); Sofia Kenin (USA)
July	Wang Qiang (CHN)	Olga Danilović (SRB); Maria Sakkari (GRE); Anastasia Potapova (RUS)
August	Aryna Sabalenka (BLR)	Anastasija Sevastova (LAT); Lesia Tsurenko (UKR); Markéta Vondroušová (CZE); Ashleigh Barty (AUS)
September	Anett Kontaveit (EST)	Wang Qiang (CHN); Donna Vekić (CRO)
October	Ashleigh Barty (AUS)	Kiki Bertens (NED); Anastasija Sevastova (LAT)

=== Shot of the month ===
Month	Winner	Other candidates
January	Agnieszka Radwańska (POL) (59%)	Maria Sharapova (RUS) (20%); Angelique Kerber (GER) (18%); Daria Gavrilova (AUS) (2%); Johanna Konta (GBR) (1%)
February	Maria Sharapova (RUS) (32%)	Petra Kvitová (CZE) (27%); Agnieszka Radwańska (POL) (20%); Anastasia Potapova (RUS) (13%); Angelique Kerber (GER) (8%)
March	Simona Halep (ROU) (81%)	Caroline Wozniacki (DEN) (7%); Naomi Osaka (JPN) (5%); Caroline Dolehide (USA) (4%); Angelique Kerber (GER) (3%)
April	Maria Sharapova (RUS)	Julia Görges (GER); Caroline Wozniacki (DEN); Kiki Bertens (NED); Alizé Cornet (FRA)
May	Simona Halep (ROU)	Petra Kvitová (CZE); Maria Sharapova (RUS); Angelique Kerber (GER); Anastasia Pavlyuchenkova (RUS)
June	Caroline Wozniacki (DEN)	Petra Kvitová (CZE); Aleksandra Krunić (SRB); CoCo Vandeweghe (USA); Dominika Cibulková (SVK)
July	Magda Linette (POL)	Venus Williams (USA); Victoria Azarenka (BLR); Sloane Stephens (USA); Svetlana Kuznetsova (RUS)
August	Maria Sharapova (RUS)	Petra Kvitová (CZE); Svetlana Kuznetsova (RUS); Caroline Garcia (FRA); Angelique Kerber (GER)
September	Hsieh Su-wei (TPE)	Petra Kvitová (CZE); Naomi Osaka (JPN); Dominika Cibulková (SVK); Amanda Anisimova (USA)
October	Ons Jabeur (TUN)	Elina Svitolina (UKR); Caroline Wozniacki (DEN); Kiki Bertens (NED); Ashleigh Barty (AUS); Wang Qiang (CHN)

== Retirements ==
Following is a list of notable players (winners of a main tour title, and/or part of the WTA rankings top 100 [singles] or top 100 [doubles] for at least one week) who announced their retirement from professional tennis, became inactive (after not playing for more than 52 weeks), or were permanently banned from playing, during the 2018 season:

- Annika Beck (born 16 February 1994 in Gießen, Germany) joined the professional tour in 2009 and reached a career-high ranking of no. 37 in singles and no. 84 in doubles. She won two singles titles and one doubles title on the WTA Tour, as well as seven singles titles on the ITF Women's Circuit. After having not played since October 2017 (2017 ITF Poitiers) due to ongoing injuries, Beck decided to end her tennis career in October 2018 in favour of academic pursuits.
- Eva Birnerová (born 14 August 1984 in Duchcov, Czechoslovakia, (modern day Czech Republic)) joined the professional tour in 2002 and reached a career-high ranking of no. 59 in singles and no. 52 in doubles. She reached one WTA singles final in Tashkent in 2011. She also won three doubles titles on the WTA Tour, as well as eight singles titles on the ITF Women's Circuit. After having not played in over four years, Birnerová decided to retire in November 2018.
- (Chinese Taipei) Chuang Chia-jung (born 10 January 1985 in Kaohsiung, Taiwan) joined the professional tour in 2001 and reached a career-high ranking of no. 177 in singles and no. 5 in doubles. Partnering Latisha Chan, Chuang reached the final of the 2007 Australian Open and the 2007 US Open women's doubles events. She also won twenty-two doubles titles on the WTA Tour, two doubles titles in the WTA 125K series, as well as ten singles titles on the ITF Women's Circuit. Chuang decided to retire in November 2018.
- Casey Dellacqua (born 11 February 1985 in Perth, Australia) joined the professional tour in 2002 and reached a career-high ranking of no. 26 in singles and no. 3 in doubles. She has reached seven grand slam doubles finals and won 7 doubles titles. She also won the 2011 French Open mixed doubles event alongside Scott Lipsky. Dellacqua played her last professional match in February during a deciding Fed Cup doubles tie.
- (New Zealand) Marina Erakovic (born 6 March 1988 in Split, SFR Yugoslavia, (modern day Croatia)) joined the professional tour in 2005 and reached a career-high ranking of no. 39 in singles and no. 25 in doubles. She won 1 WTA Singles title in Memphis in 2013, along with 8 WTA doubles titles. She enjoyed more success at Grand Slam level in doubles, reaching the semi-finals of Wimbledon in 2011, as well as the quarterfinals at the US Open in 2008 and the French Open in 2013 and 2014. She was plagued by injury throughout her career and, after missing the entirety of the 2018 season with a back injury, she announced her retirement in December 2018.
- Bojana Jovanovski Petrović (born 31 December 1991 in Belgrade, Serbia) joined the professional tour in 2006 and reached a career-high ranking of no. 32 in singles and no. 203 in doubles. She won 2 WTA Tour singles titles, as well as 1 WTA 125K Series Title in 2013 and 4 ITF singles titles. She was part of the Serbian team that finished runner-up to the Czech Republic at the 2012 Fed Cup. Jovanovski Petrović underwent surgery for a shoulder injury in 2016, and despite making a limited comeback on the ITF Circuit at the beginning of the season, she decided to end her career in November 2018.
- Karin Knapp (born 28 June 1987 in Bruneck, Italy) joined the professional tour in 2002 and reached a career-high ranking of no. 33 in singles and no. 49 in doubles. Knapp won 2 singles titles during her career. As a member of the Italian Fed Cup team, Knapp was part of the squad that won the title in 2013. After having not played tournaments since the previous year's Australian Open and due to a chronic knee injury, she announced her retirement in May 2018.
- Anabel Medina Garrigues (born 12 April 1982 in Valencia, Spain) joined the professional tour in 1998 and reached a career-high ranking of no. 16 in singles and no. 3 in doubles. Medina Garrigues won 11 singles titles and 28 doubles titles during her career. She won two Grand Slams titles at the 2008 and 2009 French Open and an olympics silver medal alongside partner Virginia Ruano Pascual also in 2008. Later in her career, she became part of Jeļena Ostapenko's coaching staff, coaching her to win the 2017 French Open singles title. She announced that the 2018 US Open would be her final tournament.
- Agnieszka Radwańska (born 6 March 1989 in Kraków, Poland) joined the professional tour in 2005 and reached a career-high ranking of no. 2 in singles and no. 16 in doubles. Radwańska won 20 singles titles and 2 doubles titles during her career. She reached the final of the 2012 Wimbledon singles event, becoming the first Polish woman in the Open era to reach a grand slam singles final. Her biggest title came at 2015 WTA Finals in Singapore where she again became the first Pole to lift the trophy. She also won the 2015 Hopman Cup with Jerzy Janowicz for her nation. Her other achievements include winning the WTA Fan Favourite Award six times and Shot of the Year five times. Radwańska announced her retirement on 14 November 2018 due to health issues.
- Virginie Razzano (born 12 May 1983 in Dijon, France) joined the professional tour in 1999 and reached a career-high ranking of no. 16 in singles and no. 82 in doubles. Razzano won two WTA singles titles, both in 2007, as well as 1 WTA doubles title and 5 ITF singles titles. She was, however, perhaps best known for being so far the only player to defeat Serena Williams in the first round of a Grand Slam singles tournament, namely the 2012 French Open. She announced her retirement in December 2018.
- Olga Savchuk (born 20 September 1987 in Makiivka, Soviet Union (modern day Ukraine)) joined the professional tour in 2004 and reached a career-high ranking of no. 79 in singles and no. 33 in doubles. Her greatest achievement in singles came at the 2006 Australian Open, reaching the third round as a qualifier. Savchuk was primarily a doubles specialist, winning 3 titles in her career, and reaching the quarterfinals of Roland Garros in 2017. She announced that the 2018 US Open would be her last tournament.
- Francesca Schiavone (born 23 June 1980 in Milan, Italy) joined the professional tour in 1998 and reached a career-high ranking of no. 4 in singles and no. 8 in doubles. Schiavone won 8 singles titles and 7 doubles titles during her career, including her most prestigious, the 2010 French Open singles title. She also reached the French Open final in 2011 and made quarterfinal appearances in all the other three majors. Schiavone also reached the semifinals or better at all Grand Slam doubles events, finishing runner-up at the 2008 French Open alongside partner Casey Dellacqua. As a member of the Italian Fed Cup team, Schiavone was part of the squads that won the title in 2006, 2009 and 2010. Initially first planned to be retired after the 2017 season, she announced her retirement from tennis via a press conference during the 2018 US Open following her last tournament (Gstaad) in July.
- Patty Schnyder (born 14 December 1978 in Basel, Switzerland) joined the professional tour in 1996 and reached a career-high ranking of no. 7 in singles. Schnyder was a six-time Grand Slam quarterfinalist, and won 11 singles titles and 5 doubles titles during her career. After initially retiring in 2011, Schnyder returned to the tour in 2015, playing mostly on the ITF Women's Circuit and reaching a peak of number 139 in the rankings. Schnyder retired for a second and final time in November 2018.
- Patricia Maria Țig (born 27 July 1994 in Caransebeș, Romania) joined the professional tour in 2009 and reached a career-high ranking of no. 83 in singles and no. 155 in doubles. Țig reached 1 WTA singles final and 2 doubles finals during her career, losing all 3 of them. She also made first round appearances in all four majors. After a period of struggling with her performances in the second half of 2017 season, she decided to focus on her health, citing back pain as the main source of discomfort. Her last played tournament was the (Guangzhou Open) in September 2017. Țig became an inactive player on 24 September 2018 after not playing for 52 consecutive weeks.
- Roberta Vinci (born 18 February 1983 in Taranto, Italy) joined the professional tour in 1999 and reached a career-high ranking of no. 7 in singles and no. 1 in doubles. Vinci won 10 singles titles and 25 doubles titles during her career. She reached the final of the 2015 US Open singles event and won five grand slams doubles titles alongside compatriot Sara Errani, with whom she completed the Career Grand Slam. As a member of the Italian Fed Cup team, Vinci was part of the four Italian title-winning squads in 2006, 2009, 2010 and 2013. Vinci announced that the 2018 Italian Open would be her final tournament.
- Aleksandra Wozniak (born 7 September 1987 in Montreal, Canada) joined the professional tour in 2005 and reached a career-high ranking of no. 21 in singles and no. 136 in doubles. Wozniak won one WTA singles title in Stanford in 2008, as well as 11 ITF singles titles. Wozniak struggled with injuries throughout most of her career, and had played predominantly on the ITF Circuit since 2015. She announced her retirement from tennis in December 2018 at the age of 31.

== Comebacks ==
Following are notable players who will come back after retirements during the 2018 WTA Tour season:

- Marion Bartoli (born 2 October 1984 in Le Puy-en-Velay, France) joined the professional tour in 2000 and reached a career-high ranking of no. 7 in singles and no. 15 in doubles. Bartoli won 8 singles titles and 3 doubles titles during her career, with her final singles title being her most prestigious, at the 2013 Wimbledon Championships where she defeated Sabine Lisicki to claim her only grand slam title. In addition, she reached the final of Wimbledon in 2007 where she lost to Venus Williams, and also reached the quarterfinals or better at each of the other three majors. Bartoli announced her retirement in August 2013 after the Cincinnati Open. In December 2017 she announced that she would return to the professional tennis tour in 2018. Bartoli was awarded a wildcard at the 2018 Mexican Open but withdrew before the tournament stating that she was injured and that she hoped to be fully fit for the grass season. However, as a result of ongoing injuries, Bartoli decided to abandon her comeback attempt in June.
- Rebecca Marino (born 16 December 1990 in Toronto, Canada) joined the professional tour in 2008 and reached a career-high ranking of no. 38 in singles. She reached her first and only tour-level final at the 2011 U.S. National Indoor Tennis Championships, losing to Magdaléna Rybáriková. She took a break from tennis to deal with mental and physical fatigue from February to August 2012. After playing some ITF and WTA tournaments, she decided in late February 2013 to take a second break from tennis with no timetable for her return. Marino started training again during the first week of September 2017 and decided to return to competition in October 2017, after being away from the game for nearly five years. She was scheduled to play an ITF 60K event in Saguenay but her comeback was delayed of three months due to ITF administrative regulations. She returned at an ITF 15K event in Antalya at the end of January 2018 and won the title in her first tournament back.

== See also ==
- 2018 WTA 125K series (lower tier WTA tour events)
- 2018 ATP World Tour
- 2018 ITF Women's Circuit
- Women's Tennis Association
- International Tennis Federation
