= 2018 Jiangxi International Women's Tennis Open =

- Date: July 23 – 29
- Edition: 5th
- Category: WTA International
- Draw: 32S/16D
- Prize money: $250,000
- Surface: Hard
- Location: Nanchang, China

Champions

Singles
- (China) Wang Qiang

Doubles
- (China) Jiang Xinyu / (China) Tang Qianhui
- Jiangxi International Women's Tennis Open

The 2018 Jiangxi International Women's Tennis Open was a professional women's tennis tournament played on hard courts. It was the fifth edition of the tournament, and part of the International category of the 2018 WTA Tour. It took place in Nanchang, China, from July 23 until July 29, 2018. Second-seeded Wang Qiang won the singles title.

== Finals ==
=== Singles ===
- (China) Wang Qiang defeated (China) Zheng Saisai 7–5, 4–0 ret.

=== Doubles ===
- (China) Jiang Xinyu / (China) Tang Qianhui defeated (China) Lu Jingjing / (China) You Xiaodi, 6–4, 6–4

== Points and prize money ==
=== Point distribution ===
Event	W	F	SF	QF	Round of 16	Round of 32	Q	Q2	Q1
Singles	280	180	110	60	30	1	18	12	1
Doubles	280	180	110	60	1	—N/a	—N/a	—N/a	—N/a

=== Prize money ===
Event	W	F	SF	QF	Round of 16	Round of 32	Q2	Q1
Singles	$43,000	$21,400	$11,500	$6,175	$3,400	$2,100	$1,020	$600
Doubles	$12,300	$6,400	$3,435	$1,820	$960	—N/a	—N/a	—N/a

== Singles main draw entrants ==
=== Seeds ===
Country	Player	Rank^{1}	Seed
CHN	Zhang Shuai	30	1
CHN	Wang Qiang	80	2
POL	Magda Linette	82	3
JPN	Kurumi Nara	99	4
RUS	Vitalia Diatchenko	107	5
CHN	Zheng Saisai	112	6
CHN	Duan Yingying	114	7
CHN	Han Xinyun	126	8

- Rankings are as of July 16, 2018

=== Other entrants ===
The following players received wildcards into the singles main draw:

- ~~(China) Yang Zhaoxuan~~
- (China) Zhang Shuai
- (China) Zheng Wushuang

The following players received entry using a protected ranking into the singles main draw:

- (Russia) Margarita Gasparyan

The following players received entry from the qualifying draw:

- (Japan) Hiroko Kuwata
- (Chinese Taipei) Liang En-shuo
- (Thailand) Peangtarn Plipuech
- (India) Karman Thandi
- (China) Xu Shilin
- (China) Xun Fangying

The following players received entry as lucky losers:

- (Japan) Momoko Kobori
- (Japan) Junri Namigata

=== Withdrawals ===
- (Slovakia) Jana Čepelová → replaced by (Japan) Ayano Shimizu
- (Serbia) Bojana Jovanovski Petrović → replaced by (China) Lu Jingjing
- (Slovakia) Kristína Kučová → replaced by (China) Lu Jiajing
- (China) Peng Shuai → replaced by (South Korea) Jang Su-jeong
- (Switzerland) Conny Perrin → replaced by (Japan) Momoko Kobori
- (Netherlands) Arantxa Rus → replaced by (India) Ankita Raina
- (China) Yang Zhaoxuan → replaced by (Japan) Junri Namigata

=== Retirements ===
- (Russia) Vitalia Diatchenko

== Doubles main draw entrants ==
=== Seeds ===
Country	Player	Country	Player	Rank^{1}	Seed
JPN	Eri Hozumi	RUS	Valeria Savinykh	153	1
CHN	Duan Yingying	CHN	Han Xinyun	192	2
USA	Jacqueline Cako	IND	Prarthana Thombare	239	3
AUS	Naiktha Bains	CHN	Ye Qiuyu	277	4

- Rankings are as of July 16, 2018

=== Other entrants ===
The following pairs received wildcards into the doubles main draw:

- (China) Liu Yanni / (China) Yuan Yue
- (China) Sun Xuliu / (China) Zheng Wushuang
