= 2018 Volvo Car Open – Doubles =

Doubles
- 2018 Volvo Car Open

Final
- Champions: (Russia) Alla Kudryavtseva (Slovenia) Katarina Srebotnik
- Runners-up: (Slovenia) Andreja Klepač (Spain) María José Martínez Sánchez
- Score: 6–3, 6–3

Details
- Draw: 16
- Seeds: 4

Events
Singles	Doubles
← 2017 ·	Charleston Open	· 2019 →

Bethanie Mattek-Sands and Lucie Šafářová were the defending champions, but Šafářová did not participate due to illness. Mattek-Sands played alongside Andrea Sestini Hlaváčková, but lost in the quarterfinals to Alla Kudryavtseva and Katarina Srebotnik.

Kudryavtseva and Srebotnik went on to win the title, defeating Andreja Klepač and María José Martínez Sánchez in the final, 6–3, 6–3.

== Seeds ==
1. (Canada) Gabriela Dabrowski / (China) Xu Yifan (first round)
2. (United States) Bethanie Mattek-Sands / (Czech Republic) Andrea Sestini Hlaváčková (quarterfinals)
3. (Slovenia) Andreja Klepač / (Spain) María José Martínez Sánchez (final)
4. (Czech Republic) Barbora Krejčíková / (Czech Republic) Kateřina Siniaková (first round)

== Draw ==
=== Key ===
- Q = Qualifier
- WC = Wild card
- LL = Lucky loser
- Alt = Alternate
- SE = Special exempt
- PR = Protected ranking
- ITF = ITF entry
- JE = Junior exempt
- w/o = Walkover
- r = Retired
- d = Defaulted
- SR = Special ranking

=== Draw ===
First round
1	(Canada) G Dabrowski (China) Y Xu	5	6	[7]
(United States) R Atawo (Germany) A-L Grönefeld	7	4	[10]
WC	(Japan) M Doi (United States) C McHale	6	3	[8]
(Romania) M Buzărnescu (United Kingdom) H Watson	3	6	[10]
3	(Slovenia) A Klepač (Spain) MJ Martínez Sánchez	6	6
(Poland) A Rosolska (United States) A Spears	1	3
(Germany) T Maria (Czech Republic) Kr Plíšková	4	5
WC	(Spain) L Arruabarrena (Italy) S Errani	6	7
(Australia) M Adamczak (Ukraine) L Kichenok	5	6	[7]
(Ukraine) N Kichenok (Australia) An Rodionova	7	1	[10]
(Ukraine) K Bondarenko (Serbia) A Krunić	6	1	[10]
4	(Czech Republic) B Krejčíková (Czech Republic) K Siniaková	2	6	[5]
(United States) N Melichar (Czech Republic) K Peschke	1	6	[8]
(Russia) A Kudryavtseva (Slovenia) K Srebotnik	6	4	[10]
(Japan) S Aoyama (China) Z Yang	3	2
2	(United States) B Mattek-Sands (Czech Republic) A Sestini Hlaváčková	6	6

Quarterfinals
(United States) R Atawo (Germany) A-L Grönefeld	6	3	[1]
(Romania) M Buzărnescu (United Kingdom) H Watson	4	6	[10]
3	(Slovenia) A Klepač (Spain) MJ Martínez Sánchez	w/o
WC	(Spain) L Arruabarrena (Italy) S Errani
(Ukraine) N Kichenok (Australia) An Rodionova	3	3
(Ukraine) K Bondarenko (Serbia) A Krunić	6	6
(Russia) A Kudryavtseva (Slovenia) K Srebotnik	7	6
2	(United States) B Mattek-Sands (Czech Republic) A Sestini Hlaváčková	5	2

Semifinals
(Romania) M Buzărnescu (United Kingdom) H Watson	4	0
3	(Slovenia) A Klepač (Spain) MJ Martínez Sánchez	6	6
(Ukraine) K Bondarenko (Serbia) A Krunić	5	2
(Russia) A Kudryavtseva (Slovenia) K Srebotnik	7	6

Final
3	(Slovenia) A Klepač (Spain) MJ Martínez Sánchez	3	3
(Russia) A Kudryavtseva (Slovenia) K Srebotnik	6	6
