= 2018 Jiangxi International Women's Tennis Open – Singles =

Singles
- 2018 Jiangxi International Women's Tennis Open

Final
- Champion: (China) Wang Qiang
- Runner-up: (China) Zheng Saisai
- Score: 7–5, 4–0 ret.

Details
- Draw: 32
- Seeds: 8

Events
Singles	Doubles
- Jiangxi International Women's Tennis Open

Peng Shuai was the defending champion, but withdrew before the tournament began.

Wang Qiang won her first WTA Tour singles title, defeating Zheng Saisai in the final, 7–5, 4–0 ret.

== Seeds ==
1. (China) Zhang Shuai (quarterfinals)
2. (China) Wang Qiang (champion)
3. (Poland) Magda Linette (semifinals)
4. (Japan) Kurumi Nara (first round)
5. (Russia) Vitalia Diatchenko (first round, retired)
6. (China) Zheng Saisai (final, retired)
7. (China) Duan Yingying (first round)
8. (China) Han Xinyun (second round)

== Draw ==
Key

- Q = Qualifier
- WC = Wild card
- LL = Lucky loser
- Alt = Alternate
- ITF = ITF entry
- PR = Protected ranking
- SR = Special ranking
- SE = Special exempt
- JE = Junior exempt
- JR = Junior Accelerator Programme entrant
- CO = College Accelerator Programme entrant
- NG = Next Gen Accelerator Program entrant
- w/o = Walkover
- r = Retired
- d = Defaulted

=== Finals ===
Semifinals
(China) Zhu Lin	3	6	2
6	(China) Zheng Saisai	6	1	6
3	(Poland) Magda Linette	5	2
2	(China) Wang Qiang	7	6

Final
6	(China) Zheng Saisai	5	0^{r}
2	(China) Wang Qiang	7	4

=== Top half ===
First round
1/WC	(China) S Zhang	7^{7}	6
(Germany) S Lisicki	6^{0}	3
PR	(Russia) M Gasparyan	6	6
Q	(China) S Xu	1	4
(China) Y Zhang	3	4
(Czech Republic) T Martincová	6	6
(China) L Zhu	6	6
7	(China) Y Duan	2	3
4	(Japan) K Nara	6	2	4
(China) Jin Lu	3	6	6
LL	(Japan) M Kobori	6^{3}	0
Q	(China) F Xun	7^{7}	6
Q	(India) K Thandi	6	3	7
(China) Jia Lu	3	6	5
(Japan) M Kato	3	0
6	(China) S Zheng	6	6

Second round
1/WC	(China) S Zhang	6	6
PR	(Russia) M Gasparyan	4	1
(Czech Republic) T Martincová	2	3
(China) L Zhu	6	6
(China) Jin Lu	4	5
Q	(China) F Xun	6	7
Q	(India) K Thandi	4	0
6	(China) S Zheng	6	6

Quarterfinals
1/WC	(China) S Zhang	6^{3}	6	1
(China) L Zhu	7^{7}	4	6
Q	(China) F Xun	3	4
6	(China) S Zheng	6	6

Semifinals
(China) L Zhu	3	6	2
6	(China) S Zheng	6	1	6

=== Bottom half ===
First round
5	(Russia) V Diatchenko	6	4	1^{r}
Q	(Thailand) P Plipuech	4	6	3
WC	(China) W Zheng	3	3
Q	(Chinese Taipei) E-s Liang	6	6
(United States) J Cako	6	1	2
(Japan) E Hozumi	3	6	6
(South Korea) S-j Jang	4	0
3	(Poland) M Linette	6	6
8	(China) X Han	6	6
LL	(Japan) J Namigata	4	0
Q	(Japan) H Kuwata	5	3
(China) F Liu	7	6
(Japan) A Shimizu	2	0
(Uzbekistan) S Sharipova	6	6
(India) A Raina	2	1
2	(China) Q Wang	6	6

Second round
Q	(Thailand) P Plipuech	1	2
Q	(Chinese Taipei) E-s Liang	6	6
(Japan) E Hozumi	3	5
3	(Poland) M Linette	6	7
8	(China) X Han	3	3
(China) F Liu	6	6
(Uzbekistan) S Sharipova	4	6	2
2	(China) Q Wang	6	3	6

Quarterfinals
Q	(Chinese Taipei) E-s Liang	3	6	2
3	(Poland) M Linette	6	4	6
(China) F Liu	3	0
2	(China) Q Wang	6	6

Semifinals
3	(Poland) M Linette	5	2
2	(China) Q Wang	7	6

== Qualifying ==
=== Seeds ===
1. (Japan) Junri Namigata (qualifying competition, lucky loser)
2. (India) Karman Thandi (qualified)
3. (China) Zhang Yuxuan (moved to main draw)
4. (Japan) Momoko Kobori (qualifying competition, lucky loser)
5. (China) Xun Fangying (qualified)
6. (Japan) Mai Minokoshi (qualifying competition)
7. (China) Xu Shilin (qualified)
8. (Russia) Valeria Savinykh (qualifying competition)
9. (Japan) Miyabi Inoue (qualifying competition)
10. (Japan) Hiroko Kuwata (qualified)
11. (China) You Xiaodi (first round)
12. (Thailand) Peangtarn Plipuech (qualified)

=== Qualifiers ===
1. (Thailand) Peangtarn Plipuech
2. (India) Karman Thandi
3. (Chinese Taipei) Liang En-shuo
4. (China) Xu Shilin
5. (China) Xun Fangying
6. (Japan) Hiroko Kuwata

=== Lucky losers ===
1. (Japan) Junri Namigata
2. (Japan) Momoko Kobori

=== Draw ===
==== First qualifier ====
First round
1	(Japan) Junri Namigata	7	6
(China) Sun Xuliu	5	1
WC	(China) Jiang Xinyu	4	1
12	(Thailand) Peangtarn Plipuech	6	6

Qualifying competition
1	(Japan) Junri Namigata	2	1
12	(Thailand) Peangtarn Plipuech	6	6

==== Second qualifier ====
First round
2	(India) Karman Thandi	6	6
(Russia) Nika Kukharchuk	3	1
WC	(China) Liu Yanni	6^{2}	3
8	(Russia) Valeria Savinykh	7^{7}	6

Qualifying competition
2	(India) Karman Thandi	6	6
8	(Russia) Valeria Savinykh	2	3

==== Third qualifier ====
First round
Alt	(China) Ye Qiuyu	7	2	3
(Australia) Naiktha Bains	5	6	6
(Chinese Taipei) Liang En-shuo	4	6	7
11	(China) You Xiaodi	6	3	5

Qualifying competition
(Australia) Naiktha Bains	6	4	4
(Chinese Taipei) Liang En-shuo	3	6	6

==== Fourth qualifier ====
First round
4	(Japan) Momoko Kobori	6	6
WC	(China) Tang Qianhui	4	2
(China) Kang Jiaqi	0	2
7	(China) Xu Shilin	6	6

Qualifying competition
4	(Japan) Momoko Kobori	6	2	4
7	(China) Xu Shilin	4	6	6

==== Fifth qualifier ====
First round
5	(China) Xun Fangying	7^{8}	1	6
WC	(China) Ma Shuyue	6^{6}	6	4
(China) Gai Ao	0	5
9	(Japan) Miyabi Inoue	6	7

Qualifying competition
5	(China) Xun Fangying	7	6
9	(Japan) Miyabi Inoue	5	4

==== Sixth qualifier ====
First round
6	(Japan) Mai Minokoshi	4	6	6
(China) Yuan Yue	6	3	2
(Slovakia) Chantal Škamlová	4	0
10	(Japan) Hiroko Kuwata	6	6

Qualifying competition
6	(Japan) Mai Minokoshi	2	1
10	(Japan) Hiroko Kuwata	6	6
