= 2018 Jiangxi International Women's Tennis Open – Doubles =

Doubles
- 2018 Jiangxi International Women's Tennis Open

Final
- Champions: (China) Jiang Xinyu (China) Tang Qianhui
- Runners-up: (China) Lu Jingjing (China) You Xiaodi
- Score: 6–4, 6–4

Details
- Draw: 16
- Seeds: 8

Events
Singles	Doubles
- Jiangxi International Women's Tennis Open

Jiang Xinyu and Tang Qianhui were the defending champions and successfully defended their title, defeating Lu Jingjing and You Xiaodi in the final, 6–4, 6–4.

== Seeds ==
1. (Japan) Eri Hozumi / (Russia) Valeria Savinykh (first round, retired)
2. (China) Duan Yingying / (China) Han Xinyun (quarterfinals)
3. (United States) Jacqueline Cako / (India) Prarthana Thombare (quarterfinals)
4. (Australia) Naiktha Bains / (China) Ye Qiuyu (quarterfinals)

== Draw ==
Key

- Q = Qualifier
- WC = Wild card
- LL = Lucky loser
- Alt = Alternate
- ITF = ITF entry
- PR = Protected ranking
- SR = Special ranking
- SE = Special exempt
- JE = Junior exempt
- JR = Junior Accelerator Programme entrant
- CO = College Accelerator Programme entrant
- NG = Next Gen Accelerator Program entrant
- w/o = Walkover
- r = Retired
- d = Defaulted

=== Draw ===
First round
1	(Japan) E Hozumi (Russia) V Savinykh	2	3^{r}
PR	(Russia) M Gasparyan (Slovakia) C Škamlová	6	2
(Indonesia) B Gumulya (Indonesia) J Rompies	6	6
WC	(China) Y Liu (China) Y Yuan	1	2
3	(United States) J Cako (India) P Thombare	7	6
WC	(China) X Sun (China) W Zheng	5	4
(Uzbekistan) S Sharipova (India) K Thandi	4	1
(China) X Jiang (China) Q Tang	6	6
(China) F Liu (China) F Xun	3	4
(China) Jin Lu (China) X You	6	6
(China) C Liang (China) S Zheng	6^{2}	5
4	(Australia) N Bains (China) Q Ye	7^{7}	7
(China) Jia Lu (India) A Raina	3	6	[8]
(Japan) M Kobori (Japan) A Shimizu	6	4	[10]
(Thailand) N Lertpitaksinchai (Thailand) P Plipuech	6^{3}	0
2	(China) Y Duan (China) X Han	7^{7}	6

Quarterfinals
PR	(Russia) M Gasparyan (Slovakia) C Škamlová	6	1	[6]
(Indonesia) B Gumulya (Indonesia) J Rompies	4	6	[10]
3	(United States) J Cako (India) P Thombare	4	4
(China) X Jiang (China) Q Tang	6	6
(China) Jin Lu (China) X You	7	6
4	(Australia) N Bains (China) Q Ye	5	2
(Japan) M Kobori (Japan) A Shimizu	6	1	[14]
2	(China) Y Duan (China) X Han	1	6	[12]

Semifinals
(Indonesia) B Gumulya (Indonesia) J Rompies	1	1
(China) X Jiang (China) Q Tang	6	6
(China) Jin Lu (China) X You	6	7^{7}
(Japan) M Kobori (Japan) A Shimizu	2	6^{2}

Final
(China) X Jiang (China) Q Tang	6	6
(China) Jin Lu (China) X You	4	4
