= 2018 WTA Finals =

- Date: October 21 – 28
- Edition: 48th (singles) / 43rd (doubles)
- Draw: 8S / 8D
- Surface: Hard (indoor)
- Location: Kallang, Singapore
- Venue: Singapore Indoor Stadium

Champions

Singles
- (Ukraine) Elina Svitolina

Doubles
- (Hungary) Tímea Babos / (France) Kristina Mladenovic
← 2017 ·	WTA Finals	· 2019 →

The 2018 WTA Finals, also known by its sponsored name BNP Paribas WTA Finals Singapore, was a women's tennis tournament held in Kallang, Singapore. It was the 48th edition of the singles event and the 43rd edition of the doubles competition. Eight singles players and eight doubles teams competed in the tournament. The tournament was contested by eight singles players and eight doubles teams. The tournament was the year-end final of the 2018 WTA Tour. This competition was held in Singapore for the last time this year.

== Champions ==
=== Singles ===
- (Ukraine) Elina Svitolina def. (United States) Sloane Stephens, 3–6, 6–2, 6–2

=== Doubles ===
- (Hungary) Tímea Babos / (France) Kristina Mladenovic def. (Czech Republic) Barbora Krejčíková / (Czech Republic) Kateřina Siniaková, 6–4, 7–5

== Tournament ==
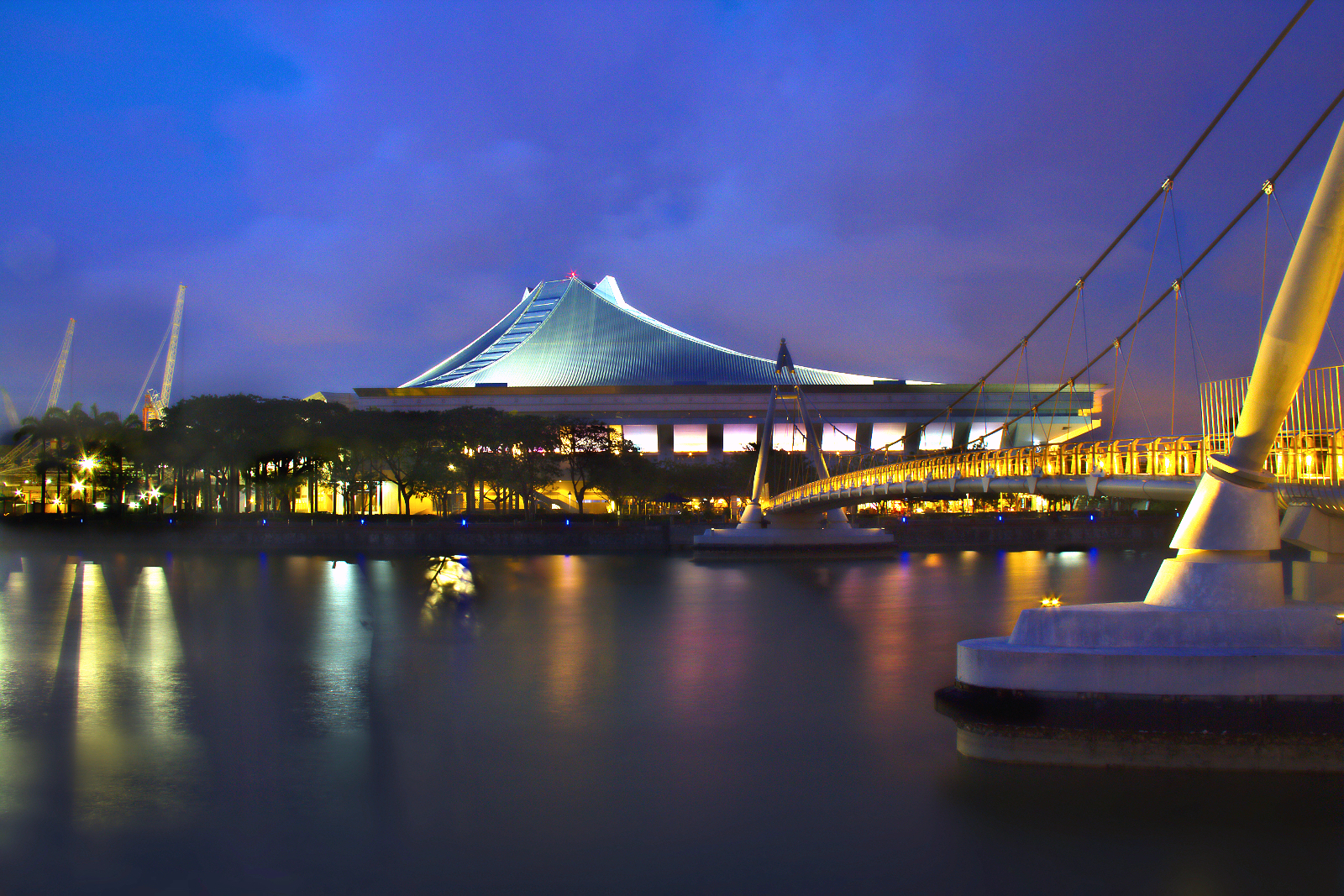
Singapore Indoor Stadium hosted the WTA Finals for the first time in 2014.

The 2018 WTA Finals took place at the Singapore Indoor Stadium the week of October 21, 2018, and was the 48th edition of the event. This was the final year in which Singapore hosted the event. The tournament was run by the Women's Tennis Association (WTA) as part of the 2018 WTA Tour. Singapore was the ninth city to host the WTA Finals since its inauguration in 1972.

=== Qualifying ===
In singles, point totals are calculated by combining point totals from sixteen tournaments. Of these sixteen tournaments, a player's results from the four Grand Slam events, the four Premier Mandatory tournaments, and (for Top 20 players at the end of 2017) the best results from two Premier 5 tournaments must be included.
In doubles, point totals are calculated by any combination of eleven tournaments throughout the year. Unlike in singles, this combination does not need to include results from the Grand Slams or Premier-level tournaments.

=== Format ===
The singles event features eight players in a round robin event, split into two groups of four. Over the first four days of competition, each player meets the other three players in her group, with the top two in each group advancing to the semifinals. The first-placed player in one group meets the second-placed player in the other group, and vice versa. The winners of each semifinal meet in the championship match. The doubles event returns to a single elimination event. The winners of each quarterfinal match will advance to the semifinals and the winners of each semifinal match will advance to the final.

==== Round robin tie-breaking methods ====
The final standings were made using these methods:

1. Greatest number of wins.
2. Greatest number of matches played.
3. Head-to-head results if only two players are tied, or if three players are tied then:

a. If three players each have the same number of wins, a player having played less than all three matches is automatically eliminated and the player advancing to the single elimination competition is the winner of the match-up of the two remaining tied players.
b. Highest percentage of sets won.
c. Highest percentage of games won.

== Prize money and points ==
The total prize money for the BNP Paribas 2018 WTA Finals was US$7,000,000.

Singles
Stage	Prize money	Points
Champion	RR^{1} + $1,750,000	RR + 750
Runner-up	RR + $590,000	RR + 330
Semifinalist	RR + $40,000	RR
Round robin win per match	+$153,000	+250
Round robin loss per match	—	+125
Participation Fee	3 matches = $151,000; 2 matches = $130,000; 1 match = $110,000	—
Alternates	2 matches = $109,000; 1 match = $89,000; 0 matches = $68,000	—
^{1} RR means prize money or points won in the round robin round.

Doubles
Stage	Prize money	Points
Champions	$500,000	1500
Runners-up	$260,000	1080
Semifinalists	$157,500	750
Quarterfinalists	$81,250	375
Prize Money per team

== Qualified players ==
=== Singles ===
#	Players	Points	Tourn	Date Qualified
inj	(Romania) Simona Halep	6,921	15	13 August
1	(Germany) Angelique Kerber	5,375	18	10 September
2	(Denmark) Caroline Wozniacki	5,086	18	4 October
3	(Japan) Naomi Osaka	4,740	19	2 October
4	(Czech Republic) Petra Kvitová	4,255	20	4 October
5	(United States) Sloane Stephens	3,943	19	14 October
6	(Ukraine) Elina Svitolina	3,850	18	17 October
7	(Czech Republic) Karolína Plíšková	3,840	23	17 October
8	(Netherlands) Kiki Bertens	3,710	24	18 October

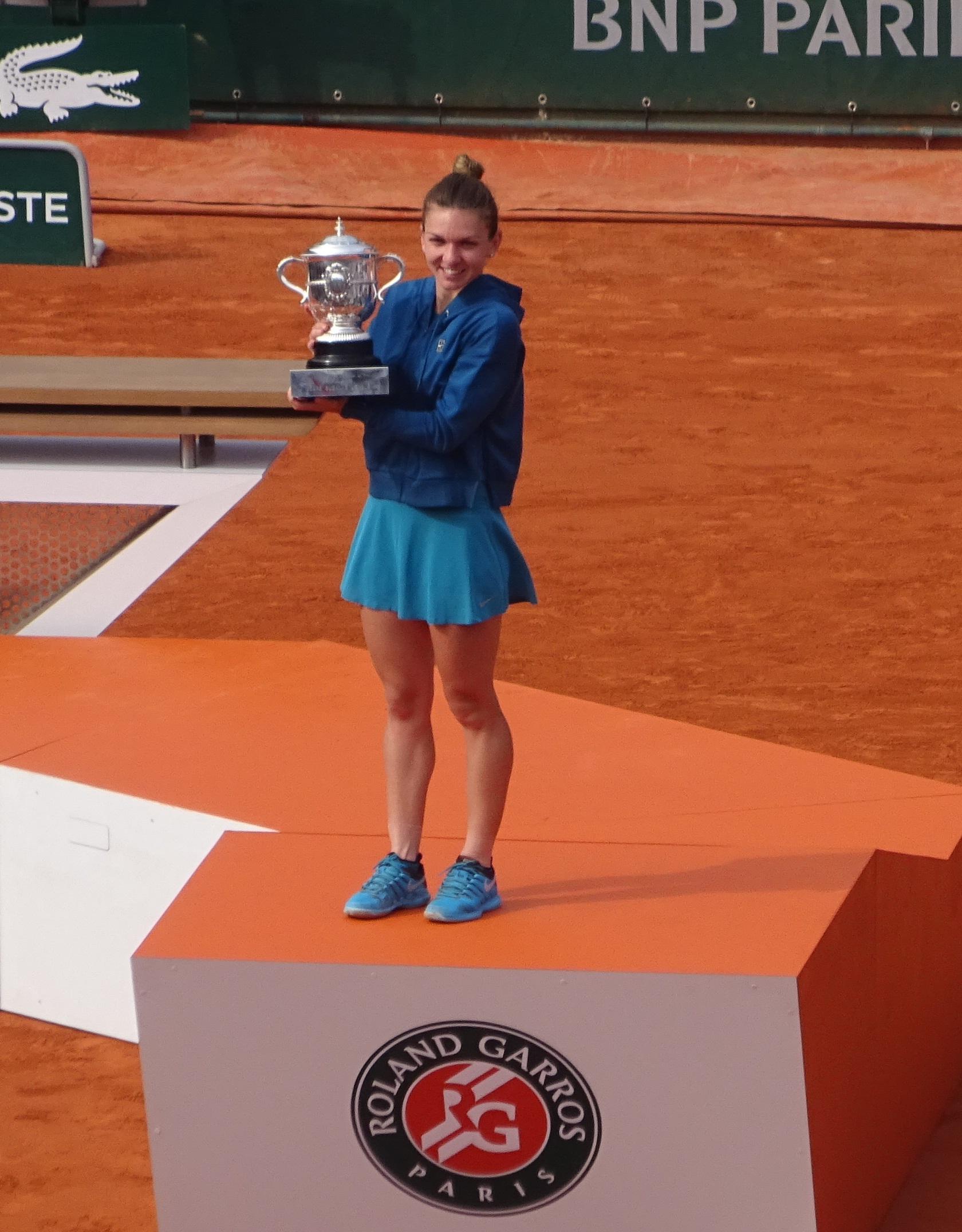
Simona Halep won her maiden slam at Roland Garros.

On 13 August, Simona Halep became the first qualifier.

Simona Halep began the year by winning the Shenzhen Open, defeating Kateřina Siniaková in the final in three sets. She then competed at the Australian Open and reached the finals after saving match points in her third round match against Lauren Davis and semifinal match against Angelique Kerber. However, she lost in the final to Caroline Wozniacki in three tight sets, also losing the number 1 ranking to Wozniacki. She then lost in the semifinals of her next two events, the Qatar Open and BNP Paribas Open to Garbiñe Muguruza and Naomi Osaka, respectively. At the Miami Open, she fell in the third round to Agnieszka Radwańska.

At the start of the clay season, Halep did not have good results, only reaching the quarterfinals at the Porsche Tennis Grand Prix and the Mutua Madrid Open, with both losses coming in straight sets to CoCo Vandeweghe and Karolína Plíšková, respectively. Halep was able to bounce back at the Internazionali BNL d'Italia reaching the final but losing to Elina Svitolina, winning only four games in the match. At the French Open, Halep won the biggest title of her career and her first Grand Slam title, defeating reigning US Open champion Sloane Stephens after coming back from a set down. However, Halep did not have much luck at the grass courts of Wimbledon, losing in the third round to Hsieh Su-wei after failing to take advantage of a set lead.

At the American hard court season, Halep started out by reaching back-to-back finals. She won the Rogers Cup by defeating Stephens again in a rematch of the French Open final. However, she lost the final of the Western & Southern Open to Kiki Bertens despite having a match point. This loss was a start of a bad stretch for the Romanian as she became the first top seed to lose in the first round of the US Open when she fell to Kaia Kanepi. She then lost her opening round matches at the Wuhan Open and China Open, giving her a four match losing streak coming into the WTA Finals. However, she announced that she would withdraw from the event because of an ongoing back injury. Even though, Halep secured the year-end No. 1 for a second consecutive year.

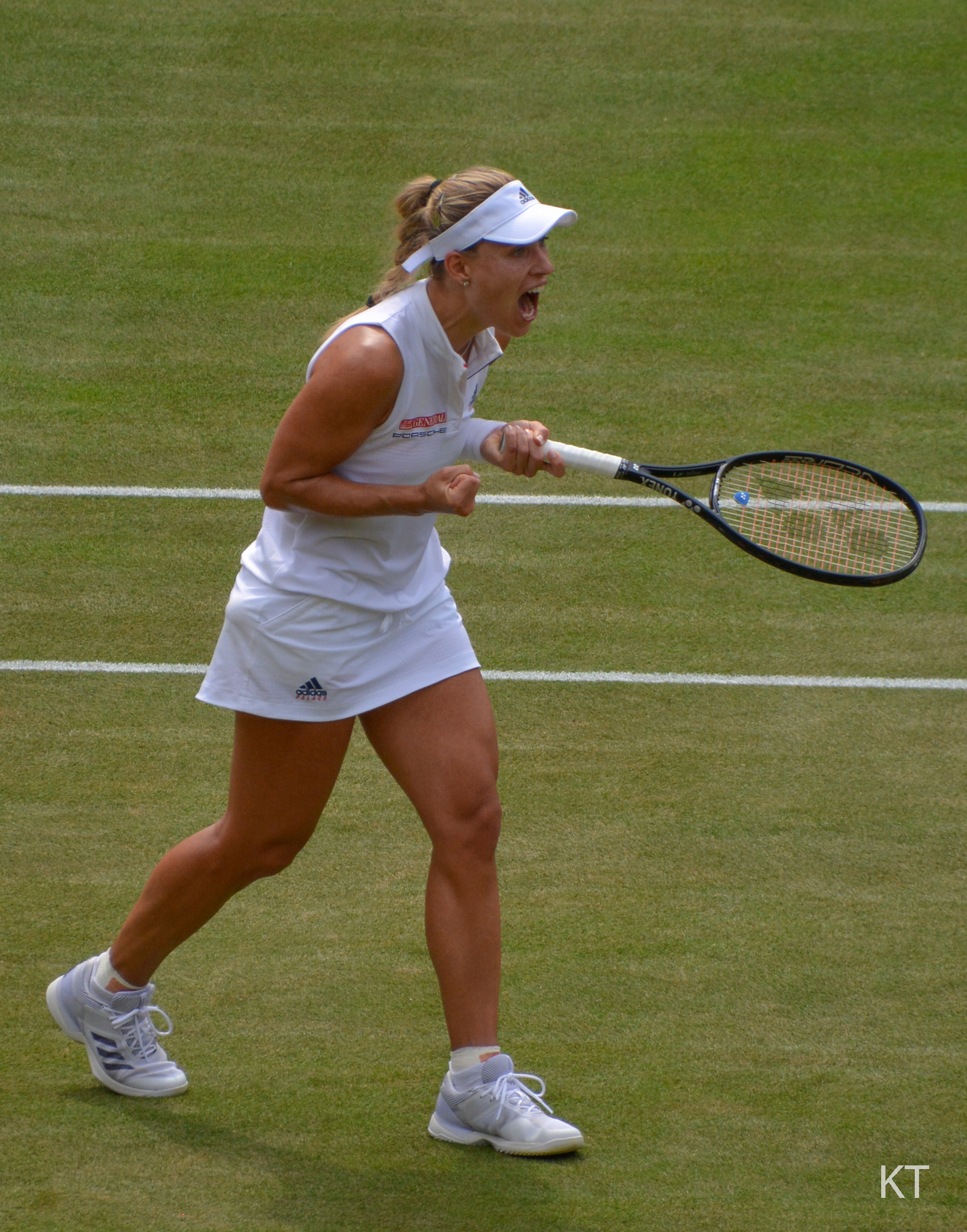
Angelique Kerber won her first Wimbledon title.

On 10 September, Angelique Kerber became the second qualifier.

Angelique Kerber began her season at the Hopman Cup to represent Germany with Alexander Zverev but lost in the final to Switzerland. At the Sydney International, Kerber claimed her first title since winning the 2016 US Open defeating local favorite Ashleigh Barty in straight sets. At the Australian Open, Kerber was able to reach the semifinals of a slam for the first time since her US Open triumph but lost to Simona Halep in three sets after failing to convert two match points she had in the final set. She then played in the middle east, where lost in the quarterfinals of the Qatar Total Open losing to then World no. 1 Caroline Wozniacki in three sets and to Elina Svitolina at the Dubai Tennis Championships in the semifinals. She then reached back-to-back quarterfinals at the BNP Paribas Open and Miami Open falling to Daria Kasatkina and Sloane Stephens, respectively.

During the clay court season, Kerber had good results reaching the quarterfinals of Internazionali BNL d'Italia and French Open losing to eventual champions Svitolina and Halep, Respectively. At the grass season, Kerber suffered an upset in the hands of Alison Riske in the first round of the Mallorca Open, but she bounced back by reaching the semifinals of Eastbourne International losing to top seed Caroline Wozniacki. At Wimbledon, Kerber won her third grand slam title and her first at the event defeating Serena Williams in the final in straight sets. This means Kerber has won 3 of the 4 slams, only missing the French Open. After her slam triumph, Kerber had poor results winning only 6 of her next 11 matches, losing early in Rogers Cup, Western & Southern Open, US Open, Wuhan Open and China Open, failing to reach a single quarterfinal.

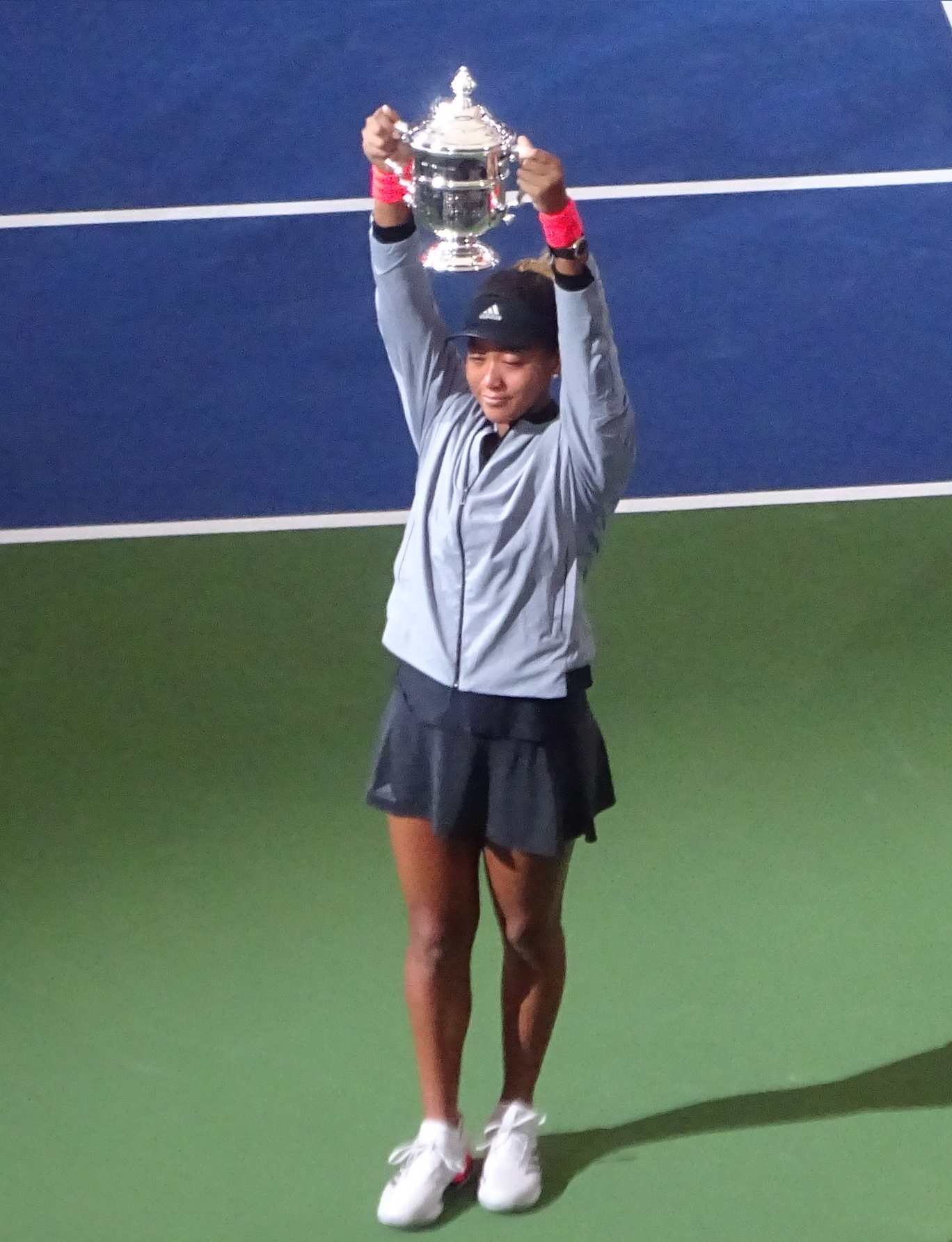
Naomi Osaka won her first slam title.

On 2 October, Naomi Osaka was announced to be making her debut at the event as the third qualifier.

Naomi Osaka began the year at the Hobart International with a first round loss to Yulia Putintseva. At the Australian Open, she made it to the fourth round with wins over 2 top 20 players but fell to Simona Halep. She suffered early loses at the Qatar Total Open and Dubai Tennis Championships. Osaka made her breakthrough at the BNP Paribas Open, winning her first title in the event defeating Daria Kasatkina in the final and defeating top 5 players Karolína Plíšková and Halep along the way. However, she fell to Elina Svitolina at the second round of the Miami Open after defeating her childhood idol Serena Williams. Osaka did not have much success during the clay season only winning back-to-back matches at the Volvo Car Open and French Open, reaching the third round losing to Julia Görges and Madison Keys, respectively. During the grass season, Osaka was able to reach the semifinals of Nottingham Open to eventual champion Ashleigh Barty and the third round of Wimbledon losing to eventual champion Angelique Kerber.

At the US Open Series, prior to the US Open she suffered a three match losing streak, with her only win coming in the Citi Open. However at the US Open, Osaka claimed her first grand slam title despite her poor preparation to the tournament. In the final she defeated Serena Williams in straight sets. Osaka followed this triumph with a final showing at her home event of the Toray Pan Pacific Open losing to Karolína Plíšková in the final. She then reached the semifinals of the China Open losing to Anastasija Sevastova.

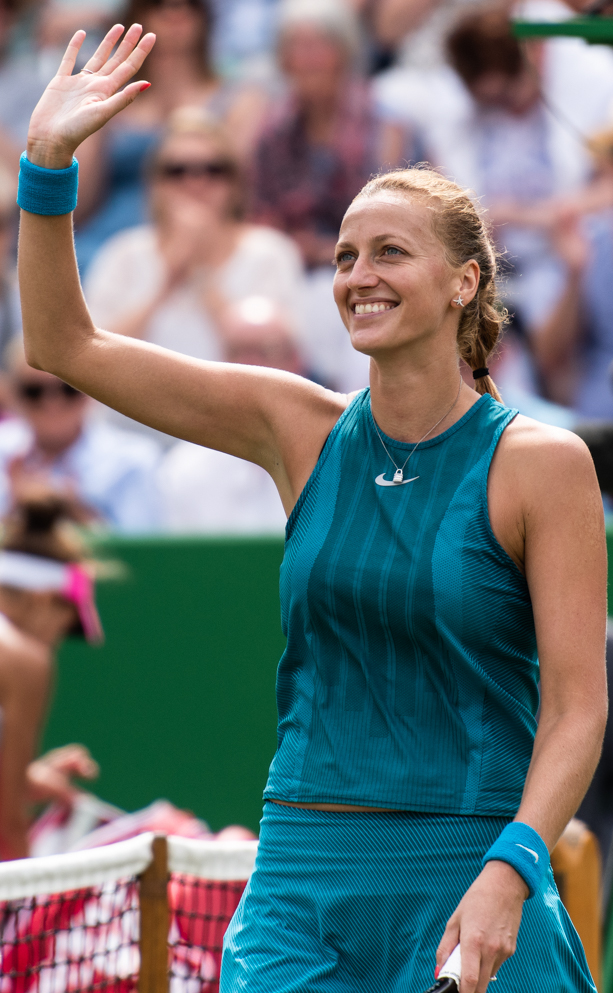
Petra Kvitová led the tour with five singles title.

On October 4, Petra Kvitová and Caroline Wozniacki booked their spots to the WTA Finals.

Petra Kvitová opened her season in Sydney, losing to qualifier Camila Giorgi in the second round. She followed this up with a first-round loss at the Australian Open to Andrea Petkovic. She found form in St. Petersburg Ladies' Trophy defeating Kristina Mladenovic in the final, before winning a second title two weeks later at the Qatar Total Open with a three-set victory over Garbiñe Muguruza. She was unable to continue this form in BNP Paribas Open and Miami Open, losing in the second round and fourth round to Amanda Anisimova and Jeļena Ostapenko respectively. Kvitová's clay court season also began slowly, falling in the first round of Volvo Car Open and Porsche Tennis Grand Prix to Kristýna Plíšková and Angelique Kerber, respectively. However, she quickly turned her form around, winning her third and fourth titles of the year at J&T Banka Prague Open and Mutua Madrid Open, defeating Mihaela Buzărnescu and Kiki Bertens in the respective finals. She then lost in the third round of the French Open to Anett Kontaveit.

Kvitová claimed her fifth title of the season on the grass courts of Birmingham, defeating Magdaléna Rybáriková in the final. At Wimbledon, she lost her first-round match against Aliaksandra Sasnovich. Her next two tournaments in Rogers Cup and Western & Southern Open ended in the third round and semi-finals respectively, both at the hands of Kiki Bertens. She made the quarterfinals of the Connecticut Open, where she retired against Carla Suárez Navarro. At the US Open, her slam results continue to disappoint as she lost in the third round to Aryna Sabalenka. She also lost in the third round of the Wuhan Open to Anastasia Pavlyuchenkova and the first round of the China Open to Daria Gavrilova.

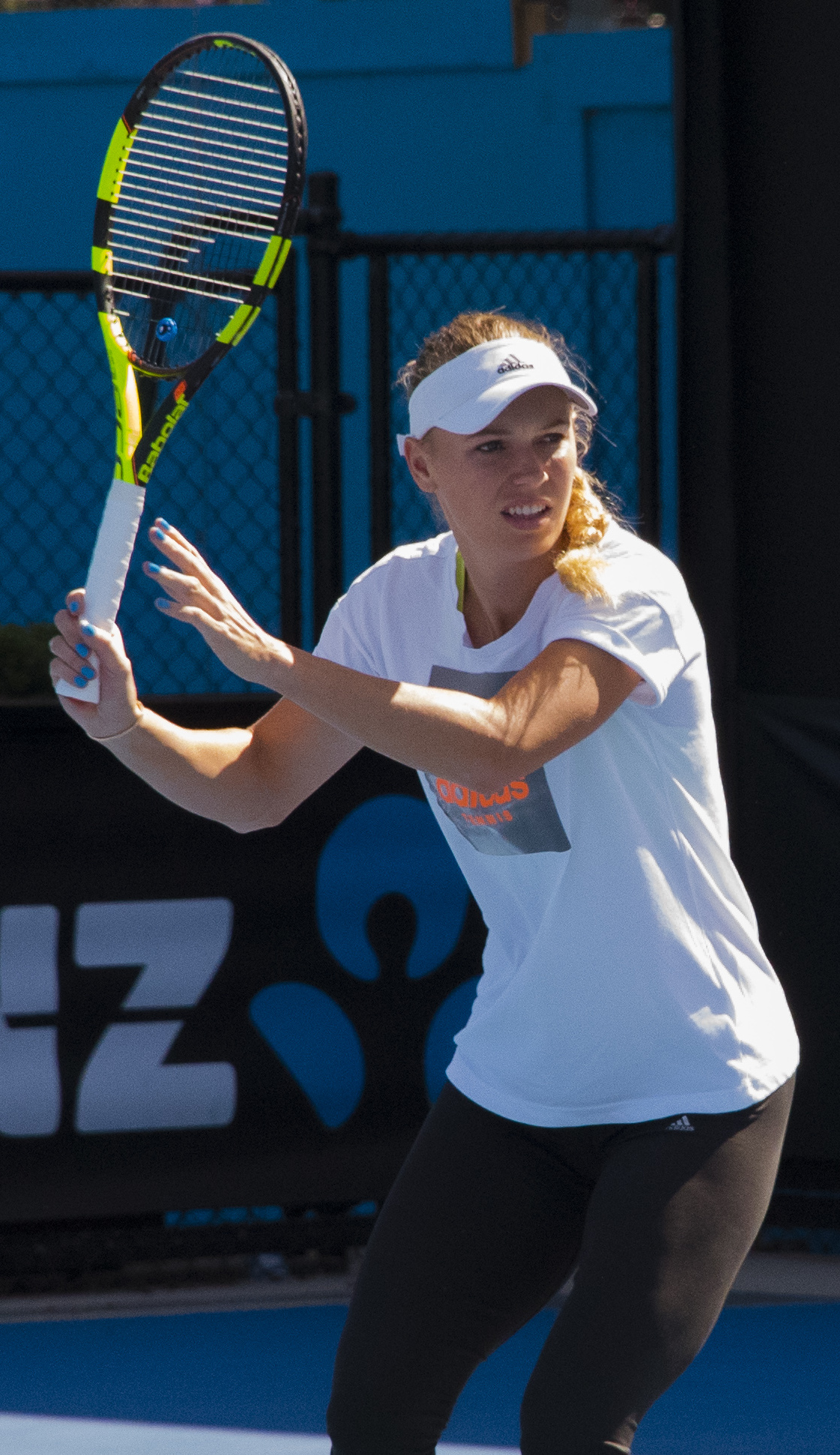
Caroline Wozniacki won first slam at Melbourne Park.

Caroline Wozniacki began her season at the ASB Classic losing the final to Julia Görges. She then went on to win her first Grand Slam title at the Australian Open. She saved two match points in the second round against Jana Fett, before going on to defeat Simona Halep in the final. This win returned Wozniacki to World No. 1 for the first time since 2012. After reaching the quarterfinals of St. Petersburg Ladies' Trophy losing to Daria Kasatkina and the semi-finals in Qatar Total Open losing to Petra Kvitová, Wozniacki was unable to progress far in BNP Paribas Open and Miami Open, losing in the fourth round and second round to Daria Kasatkina and Monica Puig respectively.

Wozniacki had a relatively quiet clay-court swing, suffering quarterfinal losses at the İstanbul Cup to Pauline Parmentier and Italian Open to Kiki Bertens as well as a third round loss in Mutua Madrid Open to Anett Kontaveit. At the French Open, she fell in the fourth round, losing to Daria Kasatkina for the third time on the season. Wozniacki won her second title of the year in Eastbourne International, defeating Aryna Sabalenka in the final. She was unable to find the same success at Wimbledon, suffering a second-round loss to Ekaterina Makarova.

Opening round losses in Rogers Cup to Sabalenka and Western & Southern Open to Bertens were followed by an early exit at the US Open, falling to Lesia Tsurenko in the second round in straight sets. The poor results continued for Wozniacki in Toray Pan Pacific Open and Wuhan Open, where she lost in the second round at both tournaments to Camila Giorgi and Puig. However, she turned her form around in Beijing, where she defeated Anastasija Sevastova in the final, claiming her first Premier Mandatory title in over seven years, doing so without dropping a set all tournament.

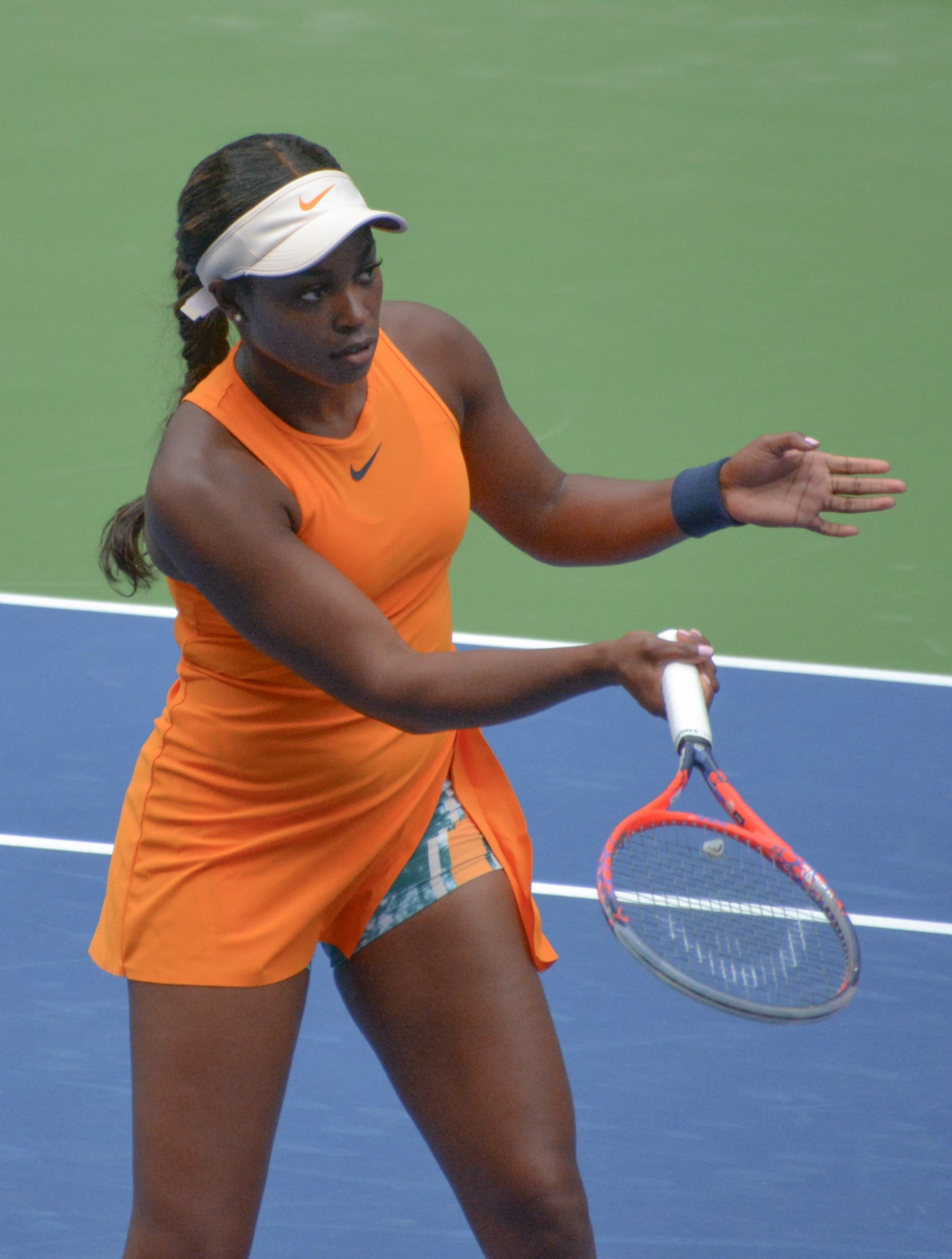
Sloane Stephens qualified for the first time in her career.

On 14 October, Sloane Stephens was announced to be making her debut at the event as the sixth qualifier.

Sloane Stephens was unable to find her form in the opening season, losing both first rounds of Sydney International and Australian Open to Camila Giorgi and Zhang Shuai. After reaching the quarterfinals of the Abierto Mexicano Telcel losing to Stefanie Vögele and third round of the BNP Paribas Open losing to Daria Kasatkina. She bounced back by winning her first Mandatory title at Miami Open by defeating Jeļena Ostapenko in straight sets. With her performance, she also made her top ten debut. It turned out that Stephens' clay court was inconsistent. She won both her Fed Cup matches against France, defeating Kristina Mladenovic and Pauline Parmentier. However she compiled a 4–4 record prior to the French Open, suffering an opening round losses at Porsche Tennis Grand Prix and Nürnberg to CoCo Vandeweghe and Yulia Putintseva and third round losses at Mutua Madrid Open and Italian Open to Karolína Plíšková and Caroline Garcia. However, she made it to the final at the French Open, where she lost to the World No. 1 Simona Halep in three sets.

Stephens did not carry any momentum into the grass-court season, losing at Wimbledon to Donna Vekić in the first round in her only event. Nonetheless, she moved up to career-high No. 3 after the tournament. During the US Open Series, she started with a second round loss to Andrea Petkovic at the Citi Open. She bounced back by reaching the final of the Rogers Cup in a rematch of the French Open but lost to Halep ounce again. At the third round of the Western & Southern Open she lost to Elise Mertens. At the rematch of last years quarterfinal of the US Open against Anastasija Sevastova, Stephens failed to defend her title and lost in the quarterfinals. After losing in the first round in both the Toray Pan Pacific Open and Wuhan Open, Stephens presented a third round performance at the China Open losing to Dominika Cibulková. She then received a wildcard at the Kremlin Cup but fell in the second round to Ons Jabeur after receiving a bye.

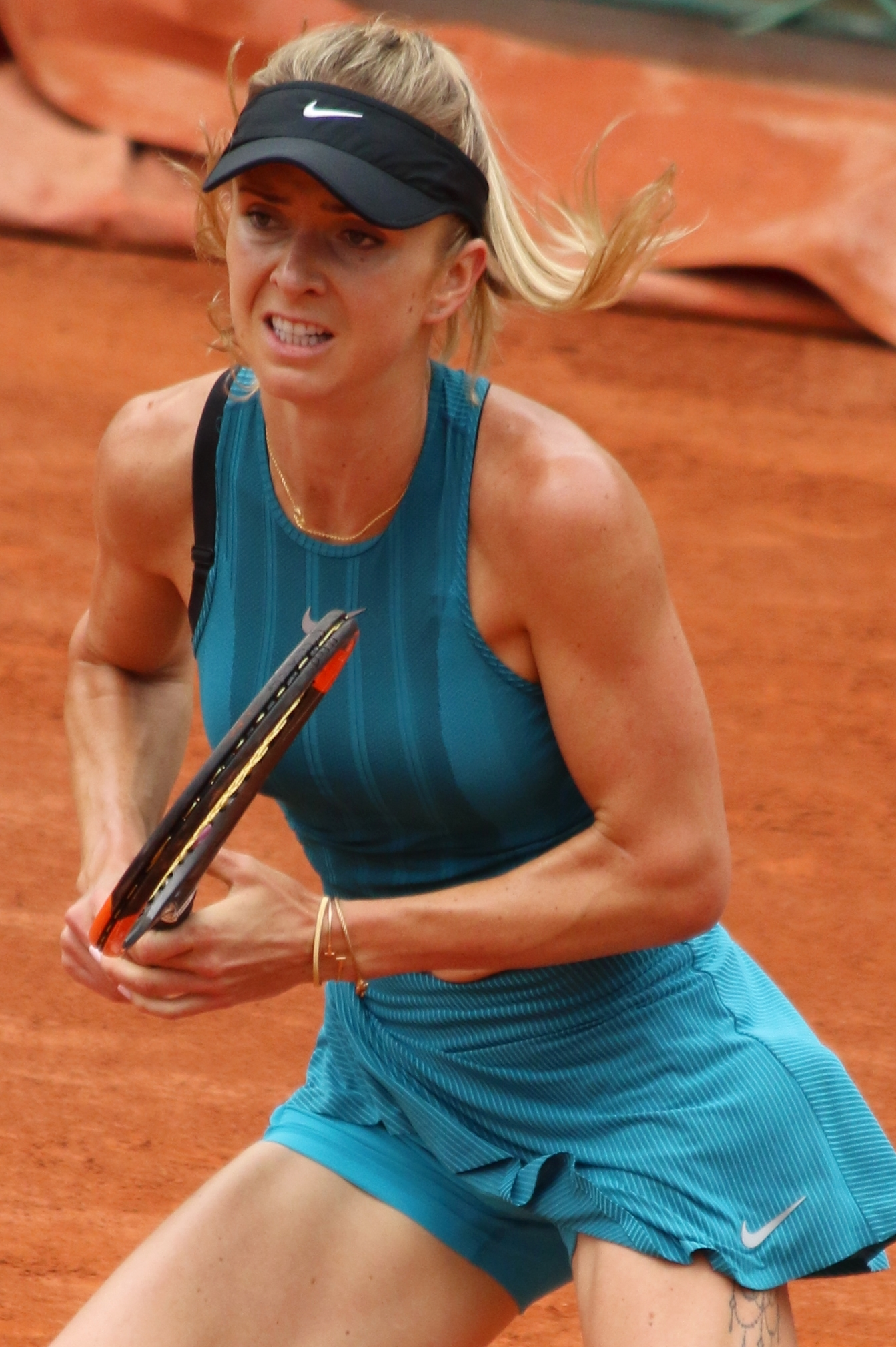
Elina Svitolina qualified for the second straight year.

On 17 October, Elina Svitolina and Karolína Plíšková became the last qualifiers.

Elina Svitolina had an excellent start to the year, claiming the Brisbane International title, defeating Belarusian Aliaksandra Sasnovich in the final for the loss of just three games. Her good form continued until the Australian Open quarterfinals, where she was upset by Elise Mertens. A third round loss to eventual champion Petra Kvitová in Doha was quickly followed by a successful defence of her title in Dubai. Her momentum stuttered at the first Premier Mandatory events of the season, losing to Carla Suárez Navarro in the third round of Indian Wells and Jeļena Ostapenko in the quarterfinals of Miami. Her clay court season began with a defeat to Caroline Garcia in the quarterfinals of Stuttgart, and a second defeat of the year to Suárez Navarro in the second round of Madrid. This was followed by her third title of the year, and second consecutive in Rome, brushing aside World Number 1 Simona Halep in the final. At the French Open, however, despite her momentum she suffered a surprise defeat at the hands of Mihaela Buzărnescu in the third round.

Svitolina's transition onto grass courts proved to be a stumbling block for her campaign, once again losing to Buzărnescu in the quarterfinals of Birmingham, followed by a loss to Tatjana Maria in the first round of Wimbledon. She did, however, regain some momentum entering the US Open Series, reaching the semifinals of the Rogers Cup, where she was the defending champion, losing to Sloane Stephens, and subsequently the quarterfinals in Cincinnati, losing there to eventual champion Kiki Bertens. She rounded out her 2018 Grand Slam campaign with a second successive round of 16 appearance at the US Open, losing to Anastasija Sevastova in three sets. A disappointing Asian swing ensued for Svitolina, as she lost back-to-back opening round matches in Wuhan, to eventual champion Aryna Sabalenka, and Beijing to Aleksandra Krunić. A quarterfinal defeat to Wang Qiang in Hong Kong meant that qualification for Singapore depended on the performances of her competitors in Moscow.

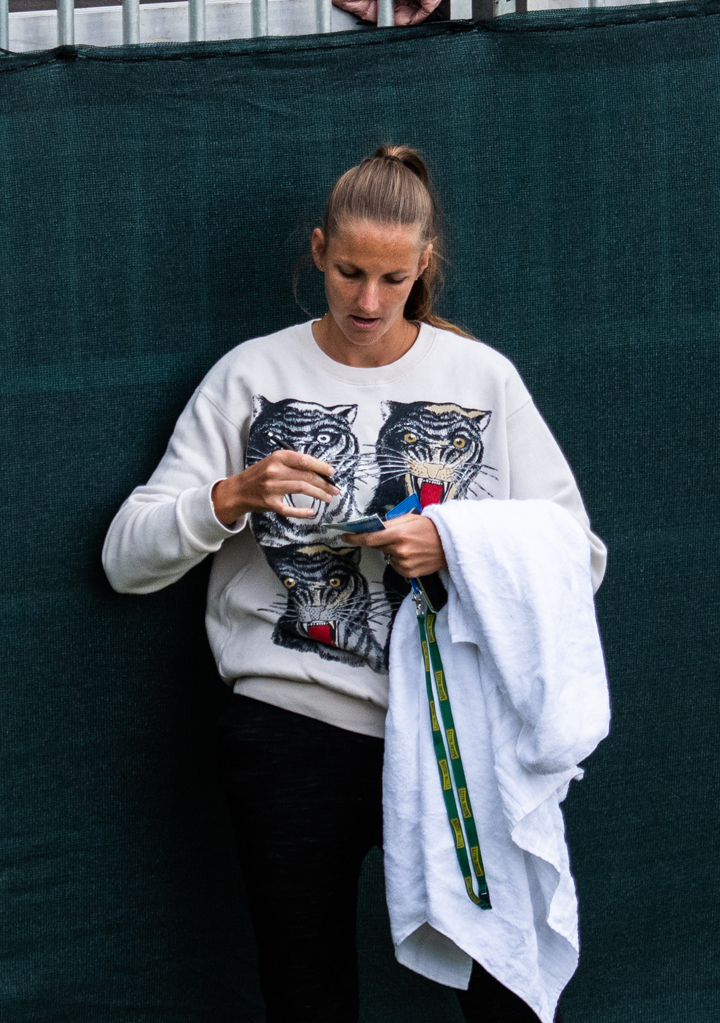
Karolína Plíšková qualified for the third straight year.

Karolína Plíšková began her year at the Brisbane International reaching the semifinals, losing to Elina Svitolina. At the first slam of the year, Pliskova was able to replicate her performance the previous year by reaching the quarterfinals before losing to Simona Halep. At the Middle East, Pliskova received an upset loss to Catherine Bellis in the third round of the Qatar Total Open and fell to Angelique Kerber in the quarterfinals of the Dubai Tennis Championships. At the back-to-back Mandatory events of BNP Paribas Open and Miami Open, she was able to reached the quarterfinals losing to Naomi Osaka and Victoria Azarenka, respectively. Pliskova was able to win her first title of the year at the Porsche Tennis Grand Prix defeating Coco Vandeweghe in the final. At the Mutua Madrid Open, she was able to continue her good run, but eventually fell to Petra Kvitova in the semifinals. At the Italian Open, Pliskova suffered a controversial loss to Maria Sakkari in her opening round match. At the clay slam of the French Open, Pliskova failed to replicate her success the previous year, falling in two quick sets to Maria Sharapova.

During the grass season, Pliskova once again lost to Magdaléna Rybáriková in the opening round of Birmingham Classic. Pliskova was more fortunate at the Eastbourne International reaching the quarterfinals losing to Aryna Sabalenka. At Wimbledon, Pliskova was able to reach the fourth round, thus breaking her streak of 5-consecutive second round exits, but fell to Kiki Bertens. Her results at the US Open Series were disappointing, losing in the second rounds of Rogers Cup and Western & Southern Open to Bertens and Sabalenka, respectively. She then fell to Ekaterina Makarova in her opening round at the Connecticut Open. However, despite this results, she was able to reach the quarterfinals of the US Open without dropping a set but lost to Serena Williams. She claimed her second title of the year at the Toray Pan Pacific Open defeating US Open champion and local hero Naomi Osaka in the final. However, she suffered back-to-back loses to Wang Qiang in the second round of Wuhan Open and third round of China Open. At the Tianjin Open, she was able to reach the final but lost to Caroline Garcia. In her last regular event of the year, the 2018 Kremlin Cup, she lost to Vera Zvonareva in the second round.

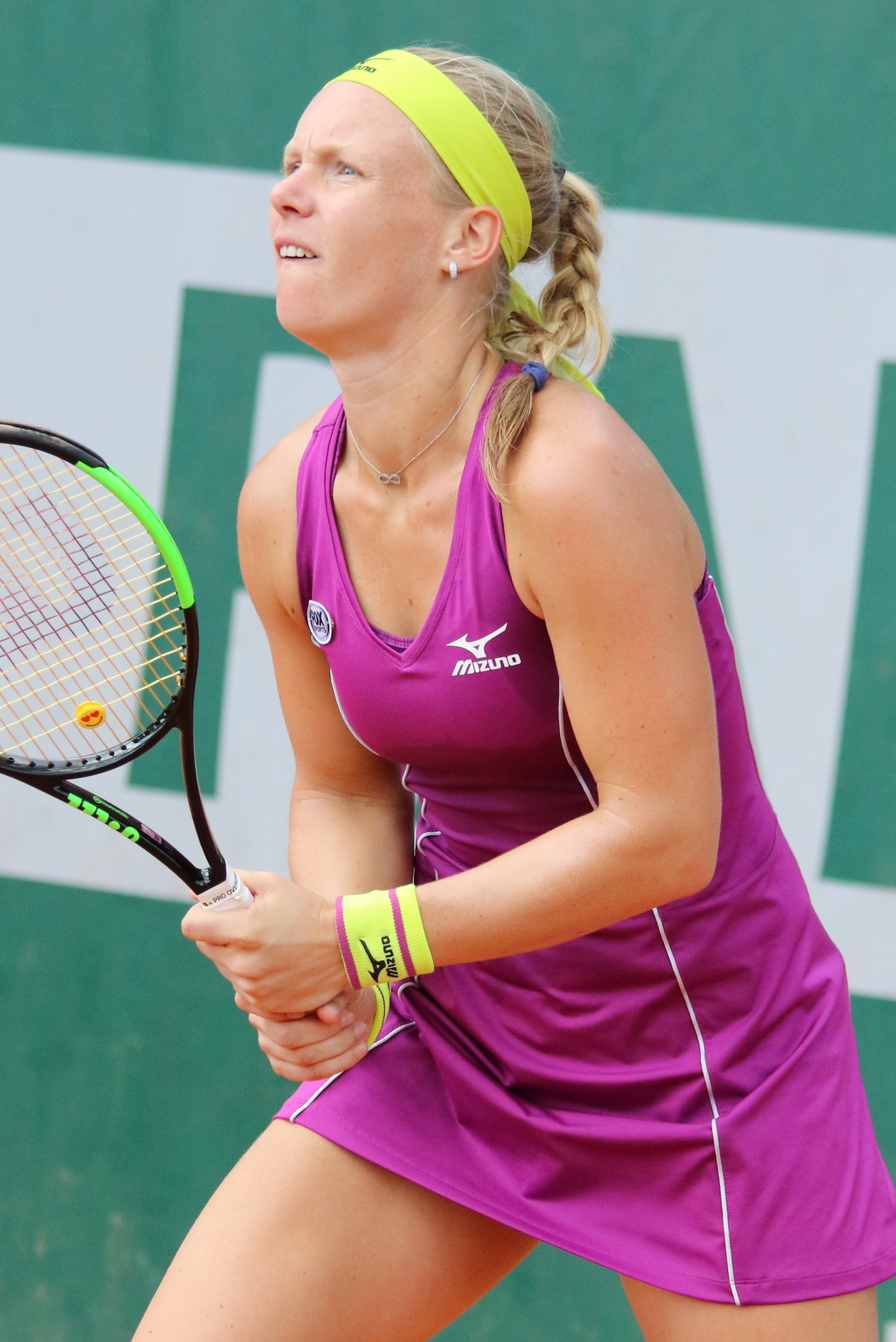
Kiki Bertens qualified for her first WTA Finals due to Halep's withdrawal.

On 18 October, Kiki Bertens secured the final spot after Simona Halep withdrew.

Kiki Bertens opened the year with a first round loss at the Brisbane International to Ana Konjuh. She followed this up by reaching the second round of the Sydney International, where she lost to the top seed Garbiñe Muguruza. At the Australian Open, Bertens fell to world No. 2 and eventual winner, Caroline Wozniacki in the third round. She then had a poor run, losing in her opening matches at St. Petersburg Ladies' Trophy, Dubai Tennis Championships and BNP Paribas Open, losing to Vera Zvonareva, Wang Qiang and Serena Williams, respectively. She eventually won a match and broke her 4 match losing streak at the Miami Open but fell in the third round to Venus Williams. She bounced back by winning her first Premier title defeating Julia Görges in straight sets in the final of the Volvo Car Open. At the Porsche Tennis Grand Prix, she fell in the first round to eventual champion Karolína Plíšková. However, at the Madrid Open she reached her first Premier Mandatory final but fell to Petra Kvitova. Despite this, she was upset by Maria Sakkari in the first round of the Italian Open. She tried to pick up form at the Nürnberger Versicherungscup but lost to Kirsten Flipkens in the quarterfinals. At the French Open, Bertens fell to Angelique Kerber in two tight tie-break sets in the third round.

During the grass season, Bertens' preparation for Wimbledon was not ideal with back-to-back loses in the second round of the Rosmalen Grass Court Championships and opening match at the Eastbourne International, losing to Flipkens and Mihaela Buzărnescu, respectively. Despite this, Bertens impressed at Wimbledon reaching the quarterfinals, where she lost to Julia Görges, but achieved a career best at Wimbledon so far by reaching the last eight. During the US Open Series, Bertens reached the quarterfinals of the Rogers Cup before losing to 15th seed Ashleigh Barty. The following week, she won the biggest title of her career at the Western & Southern Open defeating Simona Halep in the final after saving match points in the second set. However, her US Open ended in disappointment when she lost in the third round to Markéta Vondroušová in a third set tie-break. She then claimed her third title of the year at the Korea Open defeating Ajla Tomljanović in the final. However, she suffered early loses at the second round of the Wuhan Open and third round of the China Open to Anastasia Pavlyuchenkova and Kateřina Siniaková respectively. Her poor results continued with back-to-back losses at the Upper Austria Ladies Linz second round and Kremlin Cup first round to Margarita Gasparyan and Aliaksandra Sasnovich, respectively.

=== Doubles ===
#	Players	Points	Tourn	Date Qualified
1	(Czech Republic) Barbora Krejčíková (Czech Republic) Kateřina Siniaková	6,815	14	9 August
2	(Hungary) Tímea Babos (France) Kristina Mladenovic	6,445	14	20 August
3	(Czech Republic) Andrea Sestini Hlaváčková (Czech Republic) Barbora Strýcová	4,445	14	29 September
4	(Canada) Gabriela Dabrowski (China) Xu Yifan	4,180	17	4 October
5	(Belgium) Elise Mertens (Netherlands) Demi Schuurs	4,025	14	29 September
–	(Russia) Ekaterina Makarova (Russia) Elena Vesnina	3,715	6	Withdrew
6	(United States) Nicole Melichar (Czech Republic) Květa Peschke	3,545	21	4 October
7	(Slovenia) Andreja Klepač (Spain) María José Martínez Sánchez	3,505	20	4 October
8	(Australia) Ashleigh Barty (United States) CoCo Vandeweghe	3,237	7	4 October

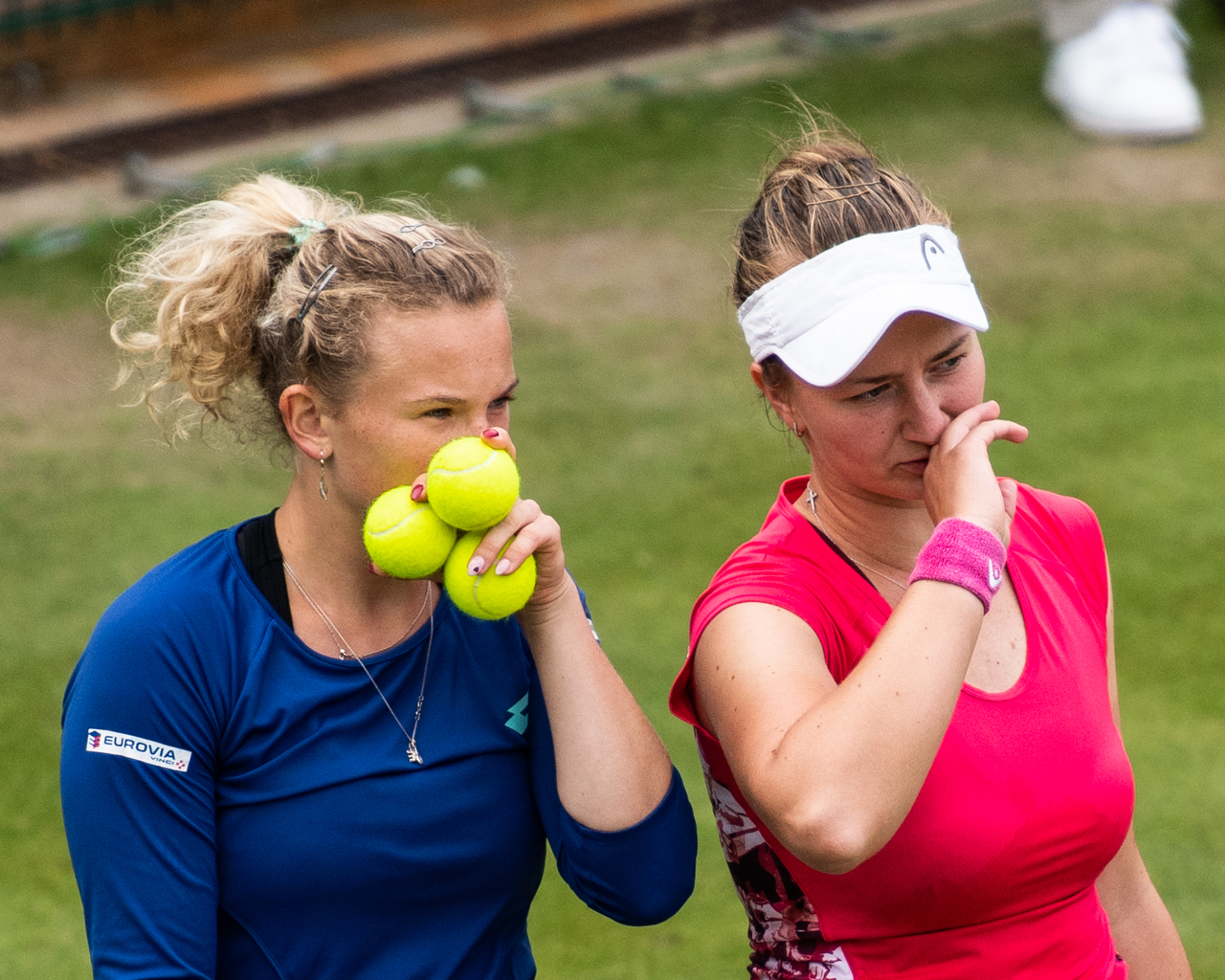
The Czechs did the French-Wimbledon double.

On August 9, the team of Barbora Krejčíková and Kateřina Siniaková qualified for the first time to the event.

Barbora Krejčíková & Kateřina Siniaková began the year with a final showing at the Shenzhen Open losing to the Romanian team of Begu/Halep in a match tiebreak. Their next final came at the Miami Open but once again fell but this time to the team of Barty/Vandeweghe in two quick sets. At the French Open, despite only winning one clay match during the lead up events, they were able to claim their first grand slam title defeating the Japanese duo of Hozumi/Ninomiya in straight sets. They followed up this victory by winning their second slam at Wimbledon defeating the team of Melichar/Peschke in three sets winning the final set in a bagel. This win comes five years after their girls doubles win at the same event. After having a poor lead up to the US Open winning only a match, they were able to reach the semifinals, however their grand slam streak was ended by Barty & Vandeweghe in two tight sets. The team is making their debut into the event.

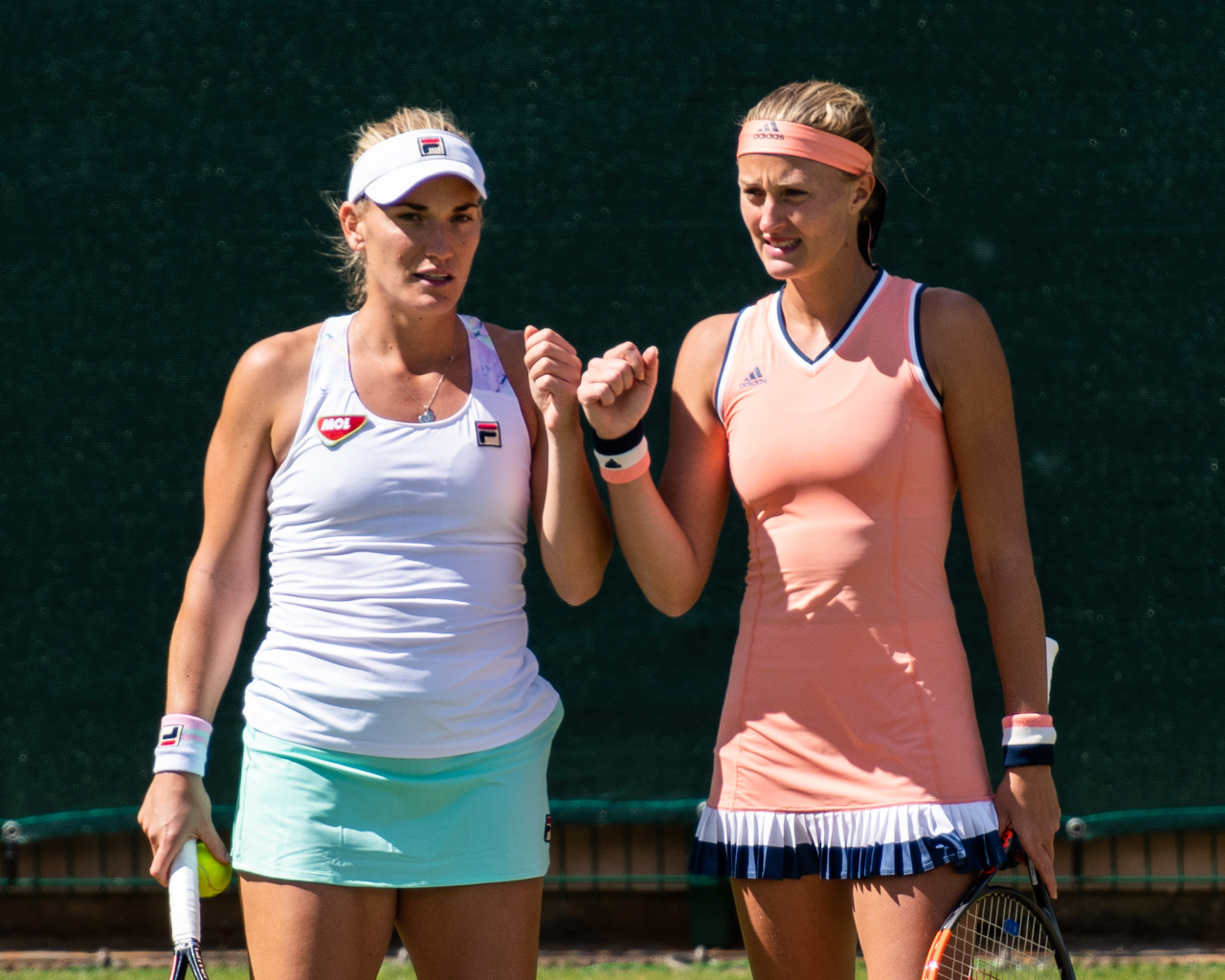
Babos/Mladenovic won their first slam as a team at the Australian Open

On August 20, the pairing of Tímea Babos and Kristina Mladenovic was announced as the second qualifier.

Tímea Babos & Kristina Mladenovic began their 2018 campaign by winning the Australian Open defeating the Russian pairing of Makarova/Vesnina in straight sets. They did not reach another final until the clay season at the Mutua Madrid Open facing once again Makarova/Vesnina but this time they end up losing in a match tiebreak. At the French Open they lost to the unseeded Japanese team of Hozumi/Ninomiya in the quarterfinals. However, they bounced back by claiming their second title at the Birmingham Classic defeating Mertens/Schuurs in the final. At Wimbledon, they suffered another upset at the quarterfinals falling to the unseeded pair Rosolska/Spears. During their US Open lead up events, they racked a record of two wins and two losses. However, they bounced back at the US Open by reaching the final but lost to Barty/Vandeweghe in three sets including two tiebreaks in the final two sets. Babos also reached the final of the Mixed Doubles at the Australian Open pairing with Rohan Bopanna, but lost to Dabrowski/Pavić.

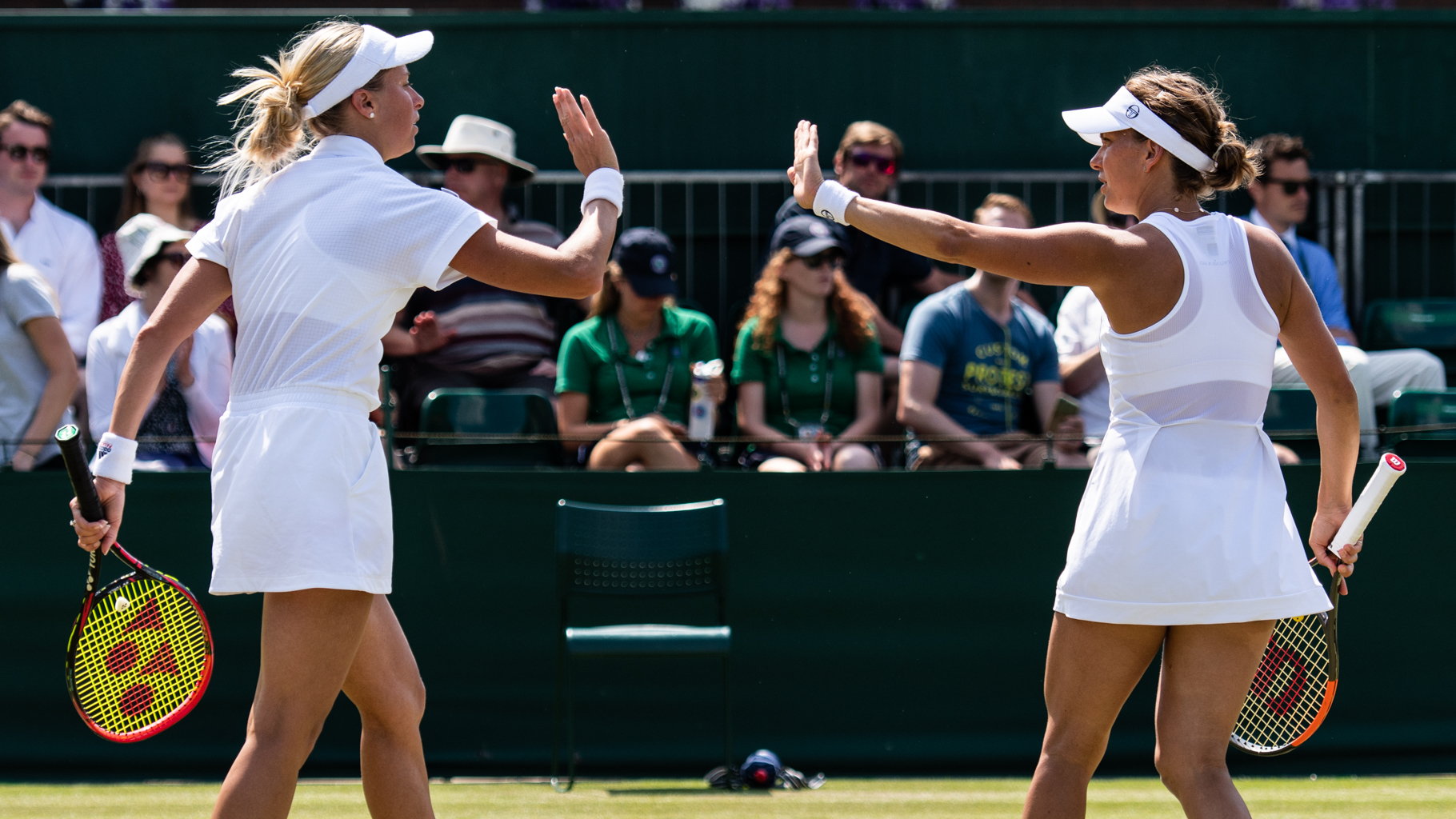
The Czech duo claimed two titles in the year.

On the September 29, the teams of Andrea Sestini Hlaváčková/Barbora Strýcová and Elise Mertens/Demi Schuurs occupied the next two slots into the event.

Andrea Sestini Hlaváčková & Barbora Strýcová did not start playing together until the Miami Open, where they lost their first match. However, they were able to make an impact as a team at the Internazionali BNL d'Italia, when they reached the final but lost to the team of Barty/Schuurs. They followed that up with semifinal showing at the French Open falling to eventual champions Krejčíková/Siniaková. Their grass season was uneventful failing to win a match on the lead up tournaments to Wimbledon and falling in the third round of Wimbledon to Mattek-Sands/Šafářová. They struggled in the Premier 5 events of the US Open Series but bounced back with their first title of the year at the Connecticut Open defeating Hsieh/Siegemund in the final. At the US Open, they suffered a third round upset to Barty/Vandeweghe. However they were able to bounce back by reaching three back-to-back finals losing the first two at the Toray Pan Pacific Open to Hozumi/Ninomiya and at the Wuhan Open to Mertens/Schuurs. However, they claimed their second title of the year at the China Open defeating Dabrowski/Xu in a match tiebreak. Strýcová also won the title at the Miami Open pairing with Hsieh Su-wei defeating Makarova/Vesnina and Sestini Hlaváčková reached the final of Sydney International with Latisha Chan losing to Dabrowski/Xu.

Elise Mertens and Demi Schuurs began the year by winning the Hobart International defeating Kichenok/Ninomiya in straight sets. They failed to win back-to-back matches until the Miami Open when they reached the semifinals losing to Krejčíková/ Siniaková. After failing to win a match during the clay season, they followed it up by winning the Rosmalen Grass Court Championships defeating Bertens/Flipkens and the final of the Birmingham Classic losing to Babos/Mladenovic. Their next final came at the hard courts of the Western & Southern Open but lost to the team of Hradecká/Makarova. They won their third and biggest title of the year at the Wuhan Open defeating the Czech team of Sestini Hlaváčková/Strýcová. Mertens also won the Ladies Open Lugano teaming up with compatriot Kirsten Flipkens defeating the Belarusian team of Lapko/Sabalenka. While Schuurs on the other hand had a perfect record playing with Australian Ashleigh Barty winning the Premier 5 events of Internazionali BNL d'Italia defeating Sestini Hlaváčková/Strýcová and the Rogers Cup defeating Makarova/Chan. Schuurs also won the Brisbane International with Kiki Bertens and the Nürnberger Versicherungscup with Katarina Srebotnik defeating Klepač/Martínez Sánchez and Flipkens/Larsson.

On October 4, following the withdrawal of Ekaterina Makarova & Elena Vesnina from the event, the final four slots were occupied by the teams of Gabriela Dabrowski/Xu Yifan, Nicole Melichar/Květa Peschke, Andreja Klepač/María José Martínez Sánchez and Ashleigh Barty/CoCo Vandeweghe.

Gabriela Dabrowski & Xu Yifan won their first title of the year at the Sydney International defeating Chan/Sestini Hlaváčková in straight sets. They followed that up with semifinal showing at the Australian Open but lost to Makarova/Vesnina. They did not reach another semifinal until BNP Paribas Open when they lost to Hsieh/Strýcová. Their clay court season was not so good having a 3–4 result in it. However, they were able to bounce back at the Eastbourne International winning the title over the Romanian pairing of Begu/Buzărnescu and reaching the semifinal of Wimbledon losing to runner-ups Melichar/Peschke in three tight sets. Their next final came at the China Open when they lost to Czech duo of Sestini Hlaváčková/Strýcová. Dabrowski also won the title at the Qatar Total Open with Jeļena Ostapenko defeating Klepač/Martínez Sánchez. She also had success in the Mixed Doubles reaching the finals twice teaming up with Mate Pavić defeating Babos/Bopanna at the Australian Open and losing to Chan/Dodig at the French Open.

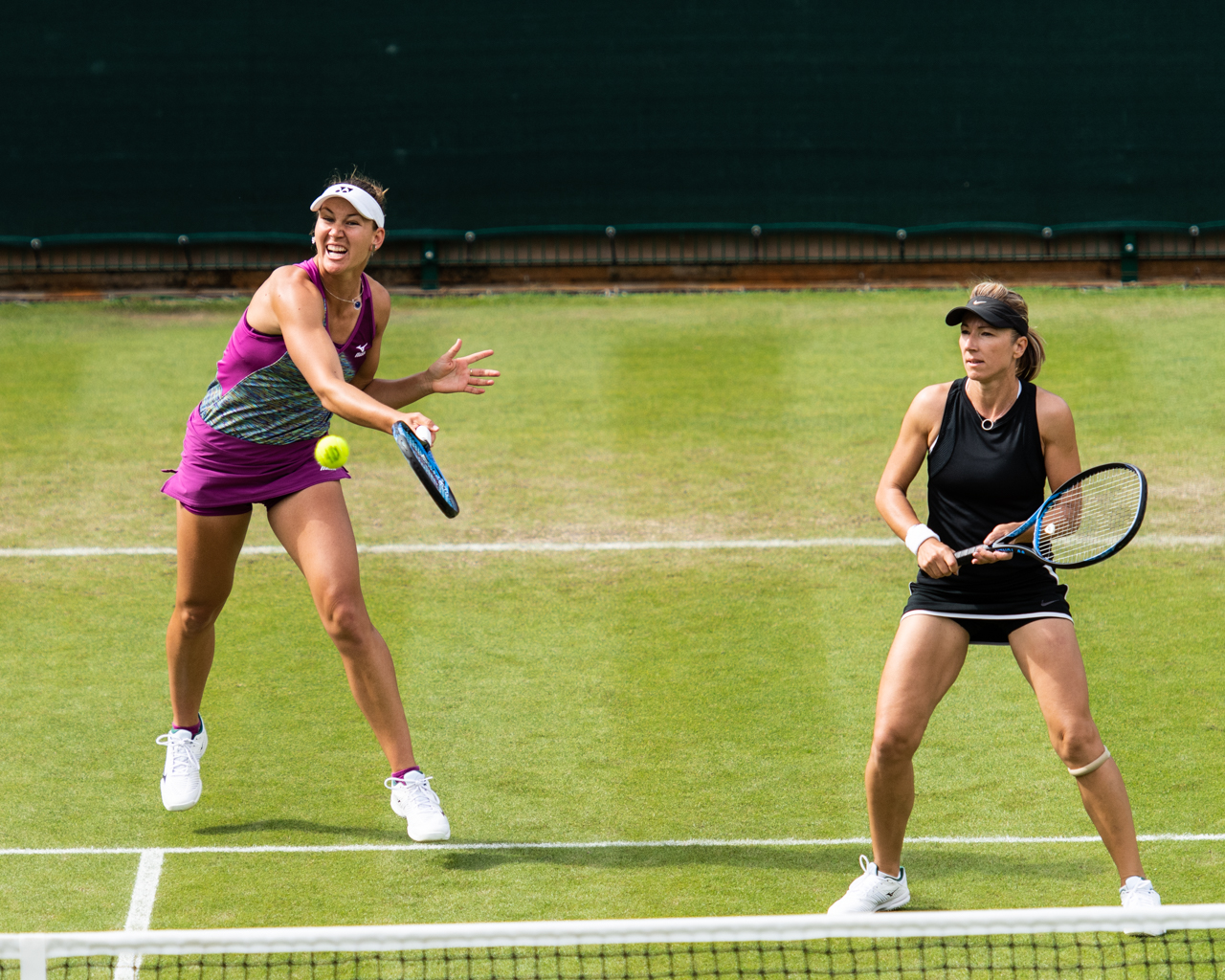
Melichar/Peschke qualified for the WTA Finals

Nicole Melichar & Květa Peschke did not start to have an impact this year until they reached back-to-back finals at the Porsche Tennis Grand Prix losing to Atawo/Grönefeld and of the J&T Banka Prague Open defeating Buzărnescu/Marozava. Their next real breakthrough came at Wimbledon reaching the finals but came short against Krejčíková/Siniaková losing the third and final set in a bagel. They then reach the semifinal of the Rogers Cup but lost to Barty/Schuurs. They then reached back to back quarterfinals of the Wuhan Open and China Open. Peschke also won the title at the Silicon Valley Classic teaming up with Latisha Chan defeating Kichenok/Kichenok. Melichar also won the Mixed doubles of Wimbledon with Alexander Peya defeating Murray/Azarenka in the final.

Andreja Klepač & María José Martínez Sánchez did not have a great start of the year with early round exits. It wasn't until the Qatar Total Open when they reached their first final but lost to Dabrowski/Ostapenko in straight sets. Even with that result they struggled before they reached the final of the Volvo Car Open but again end up losing this time to Kudryavtseva/Srebotnik. They then reached the semifinal of the Mutua Madrid Open losing to Makarova/Vesnina. They captured their first title of the year at the Mallorca Open defeating Czechs Šafářová/Štefková. Their next best result came at the Rogers cup with a semifinal loss to Chan/Makarova.

Ashleigh Barty & CoCo Vandeweghe did not play a lot of tournaments throughout the year only playing seven tournaments together but they ended up winning two big titles the Miami Open defeating Krejčíková/ Siniaková in the final and their first grand slam title as a pair and as individual when they captured the US Open defeating Babos/Mladenovic in the final. Barty also paired with Demi Schuurs and had a perfect record playing together winning the Premier 5 events of Internazionali BNL d'Italia defeating Sestini Hlaváčková/Strýcová and the Rogers Cup defeating Makarova/Chan.

Ekaterina Makarova & Elena Vesnina would have qualified for the event but had to withdraw due to Vesnina's pregnancy. The team only played together up to the Mutua Madrid Open where they won the title defeating Babos/Mladenovic in the final. They also reached two other finals but ended up losing, at the Australian Open to Babos/Mladenovic and at the BNP Paribas Open to Hsieh/Strýcová. Makarova also reached back-to-back week finals at the Rogers Cup teaming up with Latisha Chan but lost to Barty/Schuurs and the Western & Southern Open won the title with Lucie Hradecká, defeating Mertens/Schuurs in the final.

== Groupings ==
=== Singles ===
The 2018 finals featured five major champions and one finalist. The competitors were divided into two groups, representing the colors of the flag of Singapore.

Red group:

Name	Matches W–L	Sets W–L	Sets %	Games W–L	Games %
(United States) Sloane Stephens	3–0	6–2	75%	44–33	57%
(Netherlands) Kiki Bertens	2–1	5–3	62%	28–28	50%
(Germany) Angelique Kerber	1–2	3–5	37%	36–40	47%
(Japan) Naomi Osaka	0–3	2–6	25%	27–34	44%

White group:

Name	Matches W–L	Sets W–L	Sets %	Games W–L	Games %
(Ukraine) Elina Svitolina	3–0	6–2	75%	44–33	57%
(Czech Republic) Karolína Plíšková	2–1	5–2	71%	36–27	57%
(Denmark) Caroline Wozniacki	1–2	3–5	37%	37–43	46%
(Czech Republic) Petra Kvitová	0–3	1–6	14%	26–40	40%

== Day-by-day summaries ==
=== Day 1 (21 October) ===
Matches
Event	Group	Winner	Loser	Score
Singles round robin	White Group	(Ukraine) Elina Svitolina [6]	(Czech Republic) Petra Kvitová [4]	6–3, 6–3
Singles round robin	White Group	(Czech Republic) Karolína Plíšková [7]	(Denmark) Caroline Wozniacki [2]	6–2, 6–4

=== Day 2 (22 October) ===
Matches
Event	Group	Winner	Loser	Score
Singles round robin	Red Group	(United States) Sloane Stephens [5]	(Japan) Naomi Osaka [3]	7–5, 4–6, 6–1
Singles round robin	Red Group	(Netherlands) Kiki Bertens [8]	(Germany) Angelique Kerber [1]	1–6, 6–3, 6–4

=== Day 3 (23 October) ===
Matches
Event	Group	Winner	Loser	Score
Singles round robin	White Group	(Denmark) Caroline Wozniacki [2]	(Czech Republic) Petra Kvitová [4]	7–5, 3–6, 6–2
Singles round robin	White Group	(Ukraine) Elina Svitolina [6]	(Czech Republic) Karolína Plíšková [7]	6–3, 2–6, 6–3

=== Day 4 (24 October) ===
Matches
Event	Group	Winner	Loser	Score
Singles round robin	Red Group	(Germany) Angelique Kerber [1]	(Japan) Naomi Osaka [3]	6–4, 5–7, 6–4
Singles round robin	Red Group	(United States) Sloane Stephens [5]	(Netherlands) Kiki Bertens [8]	7–6^{(7–4)}, 2–6, 6–3

=== Day 5 (25 October) ===
Matches
Event	Group	Winner	Loser	Score
Day Session
Doubles Elimination	Quarterfinals	(Czech Republic) Andrea Sestini Hlaváčková (Czech Republic) Barbora Strýcová [3]	(Slovenia) Andreja Klepač (Spain) María José Martínez Sánchez	6–1, 6–2
Singles round robin	White Group	(Czech Republic) Karolína Plíšková [7]	(Czech Republic) Petra Kvitová [4]	6–3, 6–4
Evening Session
Singles round robin	White Group	(Ukraine) Elina Svitolina [6]	(Denmark) Caroline Wozniacki [2]	5–7, 7–5, 6–3
Doubles Elimination	Quarterfinals	(Czech Republic) Barbora Krejčíková (Czech Republic) Kateřina Siniaková [1]	(United States) Nicole Melichar (Czech Republic) Květa Peschke	6–1, 6–4

=== Day 6 (26 October) ===
Matches
Event	Group	Winner	Loser	Score
Day Session
Doubles Elimination	Quarterfinals	(Hungary) Tímea Babos [2] (France) Kristina Mladenovic [2]	(Canada) Gabriela Dabrowski (China) Xu Yifan	6–0, 6–2
Singles round robin	Red Group	(Netherlands) Kiki Bertens [8]	(Japan) Naomi Osaka [3]	6–3, ret.
Evening Session
Singles round robin	Red Group	(United States) Sloane Stephens [5]	(Germany) Angelique Kerber [1]	6–3, 6–3
Doubles Elimination	Quarterfinals	(Australia) Ashleigh Barty (United States) CoCo Vandeweghe	(Belgium) Elise Mertens (Netherlands) Demi Schuurs [4]	6–1, 6–4

=== Day 7 (27 October) ===
Matches
Event	Winner	Loser	Score
Day Session
Doubles Semifinals	(Czech Republic) Barbora Krejčíková (Czech Republic) Kateřina Siniaková [1]	(Czech Republic) Andrea Sestini Hlaváčková (Czech Republic) Barbora Strýcová [3]	6–3, 6–2
Singles Semifinals	(Ukraine) Elina Svitolina [6]	(Netherlands) Kiki Bertens [8]	7–5, 6–7^{(5–7)}, 6–4
Evening Session
Singles Semifinals	(United States) Sloane Stephens [5]	(Czech Republic) Karolína Plíšková [7]	0–6, 6–4, 6–1
Doubles Semifinals	(Hungary) Tímea Babos (France) Kristina Mladenovic [2]	(Australia) Ashleigh Barty (United States) CoCo Vandeweghe	6–7^{(5–7)}, 6–3, [10–8]

=== Day 8 (28 October) ===
Matches
Event	Winner	Loser	Score
Doubles Final	(Hungary) Tímea Babos (France) Kristina Mladenovic [2]	(Czech Republic) Barbora Krejčíková (Czech Republic) Kateřina Siniaková [1]	6–4, 7–5
Singles Final	(Ukraine) Elina Svitolina [6]	(United States) Sloane Stephens [5]	3–6, 6–2, 6–2

== Points breakdown ==
=== Singles ===
Updated as of 20 October 2018.

- Players in gold qualified for the WTA Finals.
- Player in brown qualified but withdrew.

Rank	Athlete	Grand Slam tournament				Premier Mandatory				Best two Premier 5		Best other						Total points	Tourn	Titles
Rank	Athlete	AUS	FRA	WIM	USO	INW	MIA	MAD	CHI	1	2	1	2	3	4	5	6	Total points	Tourn	Titles
1	(Romania) Simona Halep	F 1300	W 2000	R32; 130	R128; 10	SF; 390	R32; 65	QF; 215	R64; 10	W 900	F 585	F 585	SF; 350	W 280	QF; 100	R32; 1		6921	15	3
2	(Germany) Angelique Kerber	SF; 780	QF; 430	W 2000	R32; 130	QF; 215	QF; 215	A 0	R16; 120	QF; 190	QF; 190	W 470	SF; 185	SF; 185	R16; 105	R16; 105	R16; 55	5375	18	2
3	(Denmark) Caroline Wozniacki	W 2000	R16; 240	R64; 70	R64; 70	R16; 120	R64; 10	R16; 120	W 1000	SF; 350	QF; 190	W 470	F 180	R16; 105	QF; 100	QF; 60	R16; 1	5086	18	3
4	(Japan) Naomi Osaka	R16; 240	R32; 130	R32; 130	W 2000	W 1000	R64; 35	R64; 10	SF; 390	R32; 90	R32; 60	F 305	SF; 110	QF; 100	R16; 55	R16; 55	R16; 30	4740	19	2
5	(Czech Republic) Petra Kvitová	R128; 10	R32; 130	R128; 10	R32; 130	R32; 65	R16; 120	W 1000	R64; 10	W 900	SF; 350	W 470	W 470	W 280	R16; 105	R16; 105	QF; 100	4255	20	5
6	(United States) Sloane Stephens	R128; 10	F 1300	R128; 10	QF; 430	R32; 65	W 1000	R16; 120	R16; 120	F 585	R16; 105	R16; 105	QF; 60	R16; 30	R64; 1	R32; 1	R32; 1	3943	19	1
7	(Ukraine) Elina Svitolina	QF; 430	R32; 130	R128; 10	R16; 240	R32; 65	QF; 215	R32; 65	R64; 10	W 900	SF; 350	W 470	W 470	QF; 190	R16; 105	QF; 100	QF; 100	3850	18	3
8	(Czech Republic) Karolína Plíšková	QF; 430	R32; 130	R16; 240	QF; 430	QF; 215	QF; 215	SF; 390	R16; 120	R16; 105	R32; 60	W 470	W 470	SF; 185	F 180	QF; 100	QF; 100	3840	23	2
9	(Netherlands) Kiki Bertens	R32; 130	R32; 130	QF; 430	R32; 130	R64; 10	R32; 65	F 650	R16; 120	W 900	QF; 190	W 470	W 280	R32; 60	QF; 60	R16; 55	R16; 30	3710	24	3
Alternates
10	(Russia) Daria Kasatkina	R64; 70	QF; 430	QF; 430	R64; 70	F 650	R64; 10	QF; 215	R64; 10	R16; 105	R16; 105	W 470	F 305	SF; 185	QF; 100	QF; 100	R32; 60	3315	25	1
11	(Latvia) Anastasija Sevastova	R64; 70	R128; 10	R128; 10	SF; 780	R16; 120	R32; 65	R32; 65	F 650	QF; 190	R16; 105	W 280	SF; 185	SF; 185	SF; 185	F 180	R16; 105	3185	22	1

=== Doubles ===
- Teams in gold qualified for WTA Finals.
- Team in brown qualified but withdrew.

Rank	Team	Points											Total Points	Tourn	Titles
Rank	Team	1	2	3	4	5	6	7	8	9	10	11	Total Points	Tourn	Titles
1	(Czech Republic) Barbora Krejčíková (Czech Republic) Kateřina Siniaková	W 2000	W 2000	SF; 780	F 650	SF; 350	R16; 240	QF; 190	SF; 185	F 180	R16; 120	R16; 120	6815	14	2
2	(Hungary) Tímea Babos (France) Kristina Mladenovic	W 2000	F 1300	F 650	W 470	QF; 430	QF; 430	SF; 390	QF; 215	QF; 190	QF; 190	QF; 190	6455	14	2
3	(Czech Republic) Andrea Sestini Hlaváčková (Czech Republic) Barbora Strýcová	W 1000	SF; 780	F 585	F 585	W 470	SF; 390	F 305	R16; 240	R16; 240	QF; 190	R32; 10	4795	14	2
4	(Canada) Gabriela Dabrowski (China) Xu Yifan	SF; 780	F 650	W 470	W 470	QF; 430	SF; 390	R16; 240	QF; 190	QF; 190	SF; 185	SF; 185	4180	16	2
5	(Belgium) Elise Mertens (Netherlands) Demi Schuurs	W 900	F 585	QF; 430	SF; 390	SF; 390	F 305	W 280	W 280	R16; 240	R16; 120	R16; 105	4025	14	3
6	(Russia) Ekaterina Makarova (Russia) Elena Vesnina	F 1300	W 1000	F 650	SF; 390	QF; 190	SF; 185						3715	6	1
7	(United States) Nicole Melichar (Czech Republic) Květa Peschke	F 1300	SF; 350	F 305	W 280	W 280	R16; 240	R16; 240	QF; 215	QF; 190	SF; 185	R16; 120	3705	21	2
8	(Slovenia) Andreja Klepač (Spain) María José Martínez Sánchez	F 585	QF; 430	SF; 390	SF; 350	F 305	F 305	W 280	R16; 240	QF; 215	QF; 215	QF; 190	3505	20	1
9	(Australia) Ashleigh Barty (United States) CoCo Vandeweghe	W 2000	W 1000	QF; 215	R64; 10	R32; 10	R16; 1	R16; 1					3237	7	2
Alternates
10	(United States) Raquel Atawo (Germany) Anna-Lena Grönefeld	W 470	SF; 350	R16; 240	R16; 240	QF; 215	SF; 185	SF; 185	F 180	R32; 130	R32; 130	R16; 120	2445	22	1

== Player head-to-head ==
=== Singles ===
Below are the head-to-head records as they approached the tournament. 2018 WTA Finals – Singles

		Kerber	Wozniacki	Osaka	Kvitová	Stephens	Svitolina	Plíšková	Bertens	Overall	YTD
1	(Germany) Angelique Kerber		8–7	3–1	6–6	1–4	5–8	7–4	2–1	32–31	45–17
2	(Denmark) Caroline Wozniacki	7–8		2–0	5–8	6–1	1–3	6–3	3–2	30–25	40–15
3	(Japan) Naomi Osaka	1–3	0–2		0–0	0–1	2–3	1–2	1–0	5–11	42–17
4	(Czech Republic) Petra Kvitová	6–6	8–5	0–0		0–2	7–1	3–0	2–2	26–16	47–14
5	(United States) Sloane Stephens	4–1	1–6	1–0	2–0		2–1	2–1	1–0	13–9	33–18
6	(Ukraine) Elina Svitolina	8–5	3–1	3–2	1–7	1–2		2–5	1–1	19–23	39–15
7	(Czech Republic) Karolína Plíšková	4–7	3–6	2–1	0–3	1–2	5–2		2–3	17–24	47–21
8	(Netherlands) Kiki Bertens	1–2	2–3	0–1	2–2	0–1	1–1	3–2		9–12	44–21

=== Doubles ===
Below are the head-to-head records as they approached the tournament. 2018 WTA Finals – Doubles

		Krejčíková; Siniaková	Babos; Mladenovic	Sestini Hlaváčková; Strýcová	Dabrowski; Xu	Mertens; Schuurs	Melichar; Peschke	Klepač; Martínez Sánchez	Barty; Vandeweghe	Overall	YTD
1	(Czech Republic) Barbora Krejčíková (Czech Republic) Kateřina Siniaková		0–2	1–0	0–0	3–1	1–0	1–0	0–3	6–6	33–12
2	(Hungary) Tímea Babos (France) Kristina Mladenovic	2–0		1–0	0–0	1–0	2–1	0–1	2–2	8–4	33–12
3	(Czech Republic) Andrea Sestini Hlaváčková (Czech Republic) Barbora Strýcová	0–1	0–1		1–0	1–2	1–0	1–0	0–1	4–5	28–12
4	(Canada) Gabriela Dabrowski (China) Xu Yifan	0–0	0–0	0–1		0–3	1–1	1–0	1–0	3–4	16–8
5	(Belgium) Elise Mertens (Netherlands) Demi Schuurs	1–3	0–1	2–1	3–0		2–1	0–2	0–0	8–8	33–12
6	(United States) Nicole Melichar (Czech Republic) Květa Peschke	0–1	1–2	0–1	1–1	1–2		0–0	0–0	3–7	31–20
7	(Slovenia) Andreja Klepač (Spain) María José Martínez Sánchez	0–1	1–0	0–1	0–1	2–0	0–0		0–0	3–3	35–19
8	(Australia) Ashleigh Barty (United States) CoCo Vandeweghe	3–0	2–2	1–0	0–1	0–0	0–0	0–0		6–3	13–5

== See also ==
- 2018 WTA Tour
- 2018 WTA Elite Trophy
- 2018 ATP Finals
