= 2018 Nürnberger Versicherungscup – Doubles =

Doubles
- 2018 Nürnberger Versicherungscup

Final
- Champions: (Netherlands) Demi Schuurs (Slovenia) Katarina Srebotnik
- Runners-up: (Belgium) Kirsten Flipkens (Sweden) Johanna Larsson
- Score: 3–6, 6–3, [10–7]

Details
- Draw: 16
- Seeds: 4

Events
Singles	Doubles
- Nürnberger Versicherungscup

Nicole Melichar and Anna Smith were the defending champions, but Smith chose to compete in Strasbourg instead. Melichar played alongside Květa Peschke, but lost in the semifinals to Demi Schuurs and Katarina Srebotnik.

Schuurs and Srebotnik went on to win the title, defeating Kirsten Flipkens and Johanna Larsson in the final, 3–6, 6–3, [10–7].

== Seeds ==
1. (United States) Nicole Melichar / (Czech Republic) Květa Peschke (semifinals)
2. (Belgium) Kirsten Flipkens / (Sweden) Johanna Larsson (final)
3. (Netherlands) Demi Schuurs / (Slovenia) Katarina Srebotnik (champions)
4. (Netherlands) Lesley Kerkhove / (Belarus) Lidziya Marozava (quarterfinals)

== Draw ==
Key

- Q = Qualifier
- WC = Wild card
- LL = Lucky loser
- Alt = Alternate
- ITF = ITF entry
- PR = Protected ranking
- SR = Special ranking
- SE = Special exempt
- JE = Junior exempt
- JR = Junior Accelerator Programme entrant
- CO = College Accelerator Programme entrant
- NG = Next Gen Accelerator Program entrant
- w/o = Walkover
- r = Retired
- d = Defaulted

=== Draw ===
First round
1	(United States) N Melichar (Czech Republic) K Peschke	2	6	[10]
(Argentina) N Podoroska (Germany) A Zaja	6	2	[1]
(United States) V Lepchenko (Hungary) F Stollár	1	3
(Russia) A Fomina (Slovakia) M Hončová	6	6
3	(Netherlands) D Schuurs (Slovenia) K Srebotnik	6	6
WC	(Germany) J Niemeier (Germany) L Schmidt	2	2
(Japan) R Fujiwara (Turkey) İ Soylu	2	6	[7]
(Slovakia) C Škamlová (Czech Republic) B Štefková	6	4	[10]
(United States) K Christian (United States) S Santamaria	6^{3}	3
(Croatia) D Jurak (Sweden) C Lister	7^{7}	6
(Russia) A Komardina (Luxembourg) M Minella	2	6	[7]
4	(Netherlands) L Kerkhove (Belarus) L Marozava	6	3	[10]
WC	(Germany) K Gerlach (Germany) L Rüffer	6	5	[10]
(Germany) N Geuer (Netherlands) E Wacanno	3	7	[4]
(South Africa) C Simmonds (Germany) J Wachaczyk	4	1
2	(Belgium) K Flipkens (Sweden) J Larsson	6	6

Quarterfinals
1	(United States) N Melichar (Czech Republic) K Peschke	6	6
(Russia) A Fomina (Slovakia) M Hončová	3	2
3	(Netherlands) D Schuurs (Slovenia) K Srebotnik	6	6
(Slovakia) C Škamlová (Czech Republic) B Štefková	1	2
(Croatia) D Jurak (Sweden) C Lister	6	7^{7}
4	(Netherlands) L Kerkhove (Belarus) L Marozava	3	6^{4}
WC	(Germany) K Gerlach (Germany) L Rüffer	3	5
2	(Belgium) K Flipkens (Sweden) J Larsson	6	7

Semifinals
1	(United States) N Melichar (Czech Republic) K Peschke	2	6	[8]
3	(Netherlands) D Schuurs (Slovenia) K Srebotnik	6	2	[10]
(Croatia) D Jurak (Sweden) C Lister	4	4
2	(Belgium) K Flipkens (Sweden) J Larsson	6	6

Final
3	(Netherlands) D Schuurs (Slovenia) K Srebotnik	3	6	[10]
2	(Belgium) K Flipkens (Sweden) J Larsson	6	3	[7]
