= 2018 Nürnberger Versicherungscup – Singles =

Singles
- 2018 Nürnberger Versicherungscup

Final
- Champion: (Sweden) Johanna Larsson
- Runner-up: (United States) Alison Riske
- Score: 7–6^{(7–4)}, 6–4

Details
- Draw: 32
- Seeds: 4

Events
Singles	Doubles
- Nürnberger Versicherungscup

Kiki Bertens was the two-time defending champion, but lost in the quarterfinals to Kirsten Flipkens.

Johanna Larsson won her second WTA title, defeating Alison Riske in the final, 7–6^{(7–4)}, 6–4.

== Seeds ==
1. (United States) Sloane Stephens (first round)
2. (Germany) Julia Görges (first round)
3. (Netherlands) Kiki Bertens (quarterfinals)
4. (China) Zhang Shuai (first round)
5. (Romania) Irina-Camelia Begu (first round, retired)
6. (Romania) Sorana Cîrstea (quarterfinals, retired)
7. (Belgium) Alison Van Uytvanck (first round)
8. (Czech Republic) Kateřina Siniaková (semifinals)

== Draw ==
Key

- Q = Qualifier
- WC = Wild card
- LL = Lucky loser
- Alt = Alternate
- ITF = ITF entry
- PR = Protected ranking
- SR = Special ranking
- SE = Special exempt
- JE = Junior exempt
- JR = Junior Accelerator Programme entrant
- CO = College Accelerator Programme entrant
- NG = Next Gen Accelerator Program entrant
- w/o = Walkover
- r = Retired
- d = Defaulted

=== Finals ===
Semifinals
(United States) Alison Riske	6	6
(Belgium) Kirsten Flipkens	3	1
8	(Czech Republic) Kateřina Siniaková	6	3	1
(Sweden) Johanna Larsson	4	6	6

Final
(United States) Alison Riske	6^{4}	4
(Sweden) Johanna Larsson	7^{7}	6

=== Top half ===
First round
1/WC	(United States) S Stephens	7	4	6^{3}
(Kazakhstan) Y Putintseva	5	6	7^{7}
(United States) A Riske	6	7^{7}
Q	(Luxembourg) M Minella	1	6^{2}
(United States) M Brengle	6	6
(United States) V Lepchenko	1	3
WC	(Germany) A Petkovic	6	6^{3}	6^{5}
6	(Romania) S Cîrstea	2	7^{7}	7^{7}
3	(Netherlands) K Bertens	6	6
Q	(Serbia) D Radanović	1	1
(Germany) C Witthöft	5	3
(Germany) M Barthel	7	6
Q	(Argentina) N Podoroska	6	6
Q	(Slovakia) K Kučová	2	3
(Belgium) K Flipkens	7^{7}	2	7^{7}
7	(Belgium) A Van Uytvanck	6^{5}	6	6^{2}

Second round
(Kazakhstan) Y Putintseva	6	4	4
(United States) A Riske	3	6	6
(United States) M Brengle	3	6	3
6	(Romania) S Cîrstea	6	3	6
3	(Netherlands) K Bertens	6^{2}	6	6
(Germany) M Barthel	7^{7}	2	4
Q	(Argentina) N Podoroska	6^{6}	2
(Belgium) K Flipkens	7^{8}	6

Quarterfinals
(United States) A Riske	2	7	1
6	(Romania) S Cîrstea	6	5	0^{r}
3	(Netherlands) K Bertens	7	3	6^{3}
(Belgium) K Flipkens	5	6	7^{7}

Semifinals
(United States) A Riske	6	6
(Belgium) K Flipkens	3	1

=== Bottom half ===
First round
8	(Czech Republic) K Siniaková	2	6	6
Q	(Germany) A Zaja	6	4	1
(Paraguay) V Cepede Royg	6	6
(Ukraine) K Kozlova	3	4
(Ukraine) K Bondarenko	3	6	6^{3}
(United Kingdom) H Watson	6	3	7^{7}
Q	(Hungary) F Stollár	6	6
4	(China) S Zhang	2	2
5	(Romania) I-C Begu	4	3^{r}
(Sweden) J Larsson	6	3
(United States) C McHale	6	7^{7}
PR	(China) S Zheng	2	6^{5}
(Spain) L Arruabarrena	7^{8}	6
WC	(Germany) K Hobgarski	6^{6}	1
(Czech Republic) Kr Plíšková	6	6^{8}	7^{7}
2	(Germany) J Görges	2	7^{10}	6^{5}

Second round
8	(Czech Republic) K Siniaková	7	6
(Paraguay) V Cepede Royg	5	4
(United Kingdom) H Watson	3	3
Q	(Hungary) F Stollár	6	6
(Sweden) J Larsson	6	6
(United States) C McHale	3	0
(Spain) L Arruabarrena	3	5
(Czech Republic) Kr Plíšková	6	7

Quarterfinals
8	(Czech Republic) K Siniaková	7	6
Q	(Hungary) F Stollár	5	4
(Sweden) J Larsson	5	7	6
(Czech Republic) Kr Plíšková	7	5	4

Semifinals
8	(Czech Republic) K Siniaková	6	3	1
(Sweden) J Larsson	4	6	6

== Qualifying ==
=== Seeds ===
1. (Czech Republic) Denisa Allertová (first round)
2. (Netherlands) Lesley Kerkhove (first round)
3. (Turkey) İpek Soylu (first round)
4. (Hungary) Fanny Stollár (qualified)
5. (Czech Republic) Tereza Smitková (qualifying competition)
6. (Slovakia) Michaela Hončová (first round)
7. (Slovakia) Chantal Škamlová (first round)
8. (Ukraine) Olga Ianchuk (qualifying competition)
9. (Germany) Anna Zaja (qualified)
10. (Serbia) Dejana Radanović (qualified)
11. (Slovakia) Kristína Kučová (qualified)
12. (South Africa) Chanel Simmonds (first round)

=== Qualifiers ===
1. (Luxembourg) Mandy Minella
2. (Germany) Anna Zaja
3. (Serbia) Dejana Radanović
4. (Hungary) Fanny Stollár
5. (Argentina) Nadia Podoroska
6. (Slovakia) Kristína Kučová

==== First qualifier ====
First round
1	(Czech Republic) Denisa Allertová	6^{4}	3
(Luxembourg) Mandy Minella	7^{7}	6
WC	(Germany) Jule Niemeier	3	6	6^{3}
8	(Ukraine) Olga Ianchuk	6	3	7^{7}

Qualifying competition
(Luxembourg) Mandy Minella	6	6
8	(Ukraine) Olga Ianchuk	2	1

==== Second qualifier ====
First round
2	(Netherlands) Lesley Kerkhove	1	6	5
(Czech Republic) Anastasia Zarycká	6	2	7
WC	(Germany) Katharina Gerlach	6^{2}	3
9	(Germany) Anna Zaja	7^{7}	6

Qualifying competition
(Czech Republic) Anastasia Zarycká	7^{11}	3	4
9	(Germany) Anna Zaja	6^{9}	6	6

==== Third qualifier ====
First round
3	(Turkey) İpek Soylu	4	6	4
WC	(Germany) Lena Rüffer	6	4	6
PR	(Czech Republic) Barbora Štefková	4	5
10	(Serbia) Dejana Radanović	6	7

Qualifying competition
WC	(Germany) Lena Rüffer	5	3
10	(Serbia) Dejana Radanović	7	6

==== Fourth qualifier ====
First round
4	(Hungary) Fanny Stollár	1	6	7
(Italy) Giulia Gatto-Monticone	6	2	5
(Czech Republic) Jesika Malečková	6	6
12	(South Africa) Chanel Simmonds	4	1

Qualifying competition
4	(Hungary) Fanny Stollár	6	6
(Czech Republic) Jesika Malečková	4	1

==== Fifth qualifier ====
First round
5	(Czech Republic) Tereza Smitková	7	6
(United States) Elizabeth Halbauer	5	1
(Argentina) Nadia Podoroska	6	6
7	(Slovakia) Chantal Škamlová	4	4

Qualifying competition
5	(Czech Republic) Tereza Smitková	6^{3}	3
(Argentina) Nadia Podoroska	7^{7}	6

==== Sixth qualifier ====
First round
6	(Slovakia) Michaela Hončová	4	1
PR	(Germany) Anne Schäfer	6	6
WC	(Germany) Anna Gabric	0	2
11	(Slovakia) Kristína Kučová	6	6

Qualifying competition
PR	(Germany) Anne Schäfer	3	2
11	(Slovakia) Kristína Kučová	6	6
