= 2018 WTA Finals – Singles =

Singles
- 2018 WTA Finals

Final
- Champion: (Ukraine) Elina Svitolina
- Runner-up: (United States) Sloane Stephens
- Score: 3–6, 6–2, 6–2

Details
- Draw: 8 (RR + elimination)
- Seeds: 8

Events
Singles	Doubles
- WTA Finals

Elina Svitolina defeated Sloane Stephens in the final, 3–6, 6–2, 6–2 to win the singles tennis title at the 2018 WTA Finals.

Caroline Wozniacki was the defending champion, but was eliminated in the round-robin stage.

Naomi Osaka, Stephens, and Kiki Bertens made their debuts in the event.

This was the first time that the top four seeds were eliminated in the round robin stage, leaving the fifth to eighth seeds to qualify for the semifinals.

== Seeds ==
1. (Germany) Angelique Kerber (round robin)
2. (Denmark) Caroline Wozniacki (round robin)
3. (Japan) Naomi Osaka (round robin, retired)
4. (Czech Republic) Petra Kvitová (round robin)
5. (United States) Sloane Stephens (final)
6. (Ukraine) Elina Svitolina (champion)
7. (Czech Republic) Karolína Plíšková (semifinals)
8. (Netherlands) Kiki Bertens (semifinals)

Notes:

- (Romania) Simona Halep had qualified but withdrew due to back injury

== Alternates ==
1. (Russia) Daria Kasatkina (Did not play)
2. (Latvia) Anastasija Sevastova (Did not play)

== Draw ==
Key

- Q = Qualifier
- WC = Wild card
- LL = Lucky loser
- Alt = Alternate
- ITF = ITF entry
- PR = Protected ranking
- SR = Special ranking
- SE = Special exempt
- JE = Junior exempt
- JR = Junior Accelerator Programme entrant
- CO = College Accelerator Programme entrant
- NG = Next Gen Accelerator Program entrant
- w/o = Walkover
- r = Retired
- d = Defaulted

=== Finals ===
Semifinals
5	(United States) Sloane Stephens	0	6	6
7	(Czech Republic) Karolína Plíšková	6	4	1
6	(Ukraine) Elina Svitolina	7	6^{5}	6
8	(Netherlands) Kiki Bertens	5	7^{7}	4

Final
5	(United States) Sloane Stephens	6	2	2
6	(Ukraine) Elina Svitolina	3	6	6

=== Red group ===
		(Germany) Kerber	(Japan) Osaka	(United States) Stephens	(Netherlands) Bertens	RR; W–L	Set; W–L	Game; W–L	Standings
1	(Germany) Angelique Kerber		6–4, 5–7, 6–4	3–6, 3–6	6–1, 3–6, 4–6	1–2	3–5 (37.5%)	36–40 (47.3%)	3
3	(Japan) Naomi Osaka	4–6, 7–5, 4–6		5–7, 6–4, 1–6	3–6, ret.	0–3	2–6^{†} (25%)	27–34 (44.2%)	4
5	(United States) Sloane Stephens	6–3, 6–3	7–5, 4–6, 6–1		7–6^{(7–4)}, 2–6, 6–3	3–0	6–2 (75%)	44–33 (57.1%)	1
8	(Netherlands) Kiki Bertens	1–6, 6–3, 6–4	6–3, ret.	6–7^{(4–7)}, 6–2, 3–6		2–1	5–3^{†} (62.5%)	28–28 (50%)	2

† Following WTA rules, Osaka's retirement against Bertens was counted as a straight-set loss in determining round robin standings.

=== White group ===
		(Denmark) Wozniacki	(Czech Republic) Kvitová	(Ukraine) Svitolina	(Czech Republic) Plíšková	RR; W–L	Set; W–L	Game; W–L	Standings
2	(Denmark) Caroline Wozniacki		7–5, 3–6, 6–2	7–5, 5–7, 3–6	2–6, 4–6	1–2	3–5 (37.5%)	37–43 (46.2%)	3
4	(Czech Republic) Petra Kvitová	5–7, 6–3, 2–6		3–6, 3–6	3–6, 4–6	0–3	1–6 (14.2%)	26–40 (39.3%)	4
6	(Ukraine) Elina Svitolina	5–7, 7–5, 6–3	6–3, 6–3		6–3, 2–6, 6–3	3–0	6–2 (75%)	44–33 (57.1%)	1
7	(Czech Republic) Karolína Plíšková	6–2, 6–4	6–3, 6–4	3–6, 6–2, 3–6		2–1	5–2 (71.4%)	36–27 (57.1%)	2

Standings are determined by: 1. number of wins; 2. number of matches; 3. in two-player ties, head-to-head records; 4. in three-player ties, (a) percentage of sets won (head-to-head records if two players remain tied), then (b) percentage of games won (head-to-head records if two players remain tied), then (c) WTA rankings.
