= 2018 Qatar Total Open – Singles =

Singles
- 2018 Qatar Total Open

Final
- Champion: (Czech Republic) Petra Kvitová
- Runner-up: (Spain) Garbiñe Muguruza
- Score: 3–6, 6–3, 6–4

Details
- Draw: 56 (8 Q / 5 WC )
- Seeds: 16

Events
Singles	Doubles
- Qatar Total Open

Petra Kvitová defeated Garbiñe Muguruza in the final, 3–6, 6–3, 6–4 to win the singles tennis title at the 2018 WTA Qatar Open.

Karolína Plíšková was the defending champion, but lost in the third round to Catherine Bellis.

Caroline Wozniacki and Simona Halep were in contention for the WTA no. 1 singles ranking at the beginning of the tournament. Wozniacki retained the no. 1 ranking when she won her quarterfinal match and Halep withdrew from the semifinals.

== Seeds ==
The top eight seeds received a bye into the second round.

1. (Denmark) Caroline Wozniacki (semifinals)
2. (Romania) Simona Halep (semifinals, withdrew due to a right foot injury)
3. (Ukraine) Elina Svitolina (third round)
4. (Spain) Garbiñe Muguruza (final)
5. (Czech Republic) Karolína Plíšková (third round)
6. (Latvia) Jeļena Ostapenko (second round)
7. (France) Caroline Garcia (quarterfinals)
8. (Germany) Angelique Kerber (quarterfinals)

9. (Germany) Julia Görges (quarterfinals, retired)
10. (United Kingdom) Johanna Konta (third round)
11. (France) Kristina Mladenovic (second round)
12. (United States) Madison Keys (second round)
13. (Latvia) Anastasija Sevastova (third round)
14. (Slovakia) Magdaléna Rybáriková (second round, retired)
15. (Belgium) Elise Mertens (second round)
16. (Czech Republic) Petra Kvitová (champion)

Click on the seed number of a player to go to their draw section.

== Draw ==
Key

- Q = Qualifier
- WC = Wild card
- LL = Lucky loser
- Alt = Alternate
- ITF = ITF entry
- PR = Protected ranking
- SR = Special ranking
- SE = Special exempt
- JE = Junior exempt
- JR = Junior Accelerator Programme entrant
- CO = College Accelerator Programme entrant
- NG = Next Gen Accelerator Program entrant
- w/o = Walkover
- r = Retired
- d = Defaulted

=== Finals ===
Quarterfinals
1	(Denmark) Caroline Wozniacki	7^{7}	1	6
8	(Germany) Angelique Kerber	6^{4}	6	3
16	(Czech Republic) Petra Kvitová	6	2
9	(Germany) Julia Görges	4	1^{r}
7	(France) Caroline Garcia	6	1	4
4	(Spain) Garbiñe Muguruza	3	6	6
Q	(United States) Catherine Bellis	0	4
2	(Romania) Simona Halep	6	6

Semifinals
1	(Denmark) Caroline Wozniacki	6	6^{3}	5
16	(Czech Republic) Petra Kvitová	3	7^{7}	7
4	(Spain) Garbiñe Muguruza	w/o
2	(Romania) Simona Halep

Final
16	(Czech Republic) Petra Kvitová	3	6	6
4	(Spain) Garbiñe Muguruza	6	3	4

=== Top half ===
==== Section 1 ====
First round
(Germany) T Maria	3	0
(Germany) C Witthöft	6	6
Q	(Romania) M Niculescu	4	6	6
WC	(Russia) M Sharapova	6	4	3
WC	(Oman) F Al-Nabhani	3	1
14	(Slovakia) M Rybáriková	6	6
10	(United Kingdom) J Konta	7^{7}	6
Q	(United States) B Pera	6^{5}	1
(Spain) C Suárez Navarro	3	6	6
Q	(Ukraine) K Bondarenko	6	3	3
(Australia) S Stosur	6	6
(Romania) I-C Begu	4	2

Second round
1	(Denmark) C Wozniacki	6	6
(Germany) C Witthöft	2	0
Q	(Romania) M Niculescu	6^{6}	6	3
14	(Slovakia) M Rybáriková	7^{8}	2	0^{r}
10	(United Kingdom) J Konta	6	6
(Spain) C Suárez Navarro	2	2
(Australia) S Stosur	4	1
8	(Germany) A Kerber	6	6

Third round
1	(Denmark) C Wozniacki	7	6
Q	(Romania) M Niculescu	5	1
10	(United Kingdom) J Konta	6	1	3
8	(Germany) A Kerber	1	6	6

Quarterfinals
1	(Denmark) C Wozniacki	7^{7}	1	6
8	(Germany) A Kerber	6^{4}	6	3

==== Section 2 ====
First round
(Kazakhstan) Y Putintseva	3	1
Q	(Czech Republic) M Vondroušová	6	6
(Germany) M Barthel	6	3	5
(Poland) A Radwańska	3	6	7
WC	(Turkey) Ç Büyükakçay	0	3
16	(Czech Republic) P Kvitová	6	6
9	(Germany) J Görges	6	7
(Czech Republic) L Šafářová	1	5
(Czech Republic) B Strýcová	6	6
(Serbia) A Krunić	4	4
(Ukraine) L Tsurenko	5	4
(Romania) M Buzărnescu	7	6

Second round
3	(Ukraine) E Svitolina	6	6
Q	(Czech Republic) M Vondroušová	2	4
(Poland) A Radwańska	7^{7}	3	4
16	(Czech Republic) P Kvitová	6^{3}	6	6
9	(Germany) J Görges	6	3	6
(Czech Republic) B Strýcová	2	6	1
(Romania) M Buzărnescu	6	6
6	(Latvia) J Ostapenko	1	3

Third round
3	(Ukraine) E Svitolina	4	5
16	(Czech Republic) P Kvitová	6	7
9	(Germany) J Görges	6	6
(Romania) M Buzărnescu	2	2

Quarterfinals
16	(Czech Republic) P Kvitová	6	2
9	(Germany) J Görges	4	1^{r}

=== Bottom half ===
==== Section 3 ====
First round
(Slovakia) D Cibulková	7^{10}	6
(Russia) A Pavlyuchenkova	6^{8}	4
(Russia) E Vesnina	1	3
Q	(Russia) A Blinkova	6	6
(China) S Peng	2	4
11	(France) K Mladenovic	6	6
15	(Belgium) E Mertens	2	6	6
(Hungary) T Babos	6	1	1
(Greece) M Sakkari	2	3
(Romania) S Cîrstea	6	6
WC	(Tunisia) O Jabeur	2	3
Q	(China) Y Duan	6	6

Second round
7	(France) C Garcia	6	6^{3}	6
(Slovakia) D Cibulková	3	7^{7}	0
Q	(Russia) A Blinkova	6	6
11	(France) K Mladenovic	3	3
15	(Belgium) E Mertens	5	4
(Romania) S Cîrstea	7	6
Q	(China) Y Duan	3	4
4	(Spain) G Muguruza	6	6

Third round
7	(France) C Garcia	7^{7}	7
Q	(Russia) A Blinkova	6^{3}	5
(Romania) S Cîrstea	0	4
4	(Spain) G Muguruza	6	6

Quarterfinals
7	(France) C Garcia	6	1	4
4	(Spain) G Muguruza	3	6	6

==== Section 4 ====
First round
(Estonia) A Kontaveit	2	1
(France) A Cornet	6	6
Q	(United States) C Bellis	7	4
(Russia) D Kasatkina	5	1^{r}
(China) Q Wang	1	4
12	(United States) M Keys	6	6
13	(Latvia) A Sevastova	6	6
(Croatia) D Vekić	3	4
Q	(Japan) N Osaka	6	6
(Czech Republic) K Siniaková	4	0
(Russia) E Makarova	7	6
(China) S Zhang	5	0

Second round
5	(Czech Republic) Ka Plíšková	6	6
(France) A Cornet	2	3
Q	(United States) C Bellis	2	6	6
12	(United States) M Keys	6	3	0
13	(Latvia) A Sevastova	6	6
Q	(Japan) N Osaka	4	1
(Russia) E Makarova	3	0
2	(Romania) S Halep	6	6

Third round
5	(Czech Republic) Ka Plíšková	6^{4}	3
Q	(United States) C Bellis	7^{7}	6
13	(Latvia) A Sevastova	4	3
2	(Romania) S Halep	6	6

Quarterfinals
Q	(United States) C Bellis	0	4
2	(Romania) S Halep	6	6

== Qualifying ==
=== Seeds ===
1. (United States) Catherine Bellis (qualified)
2. (Japan) Naomi Osaka (qualified)
3. (Czech Republic) Markéta Vondroušová (qualified)
4. (Chinese Taipei) Hsieh Su-wei (first round)
5. (United States) Christina McHale (qualifying competition)
6. (Ukraine) Kateryna Bondarenko (qualified)
7. (Russia) Ekaterina Alexandrova (qualifying competition, retired)
8. (Romania) Monica Niculescu (qualified)
9. (Italy) Francesca Schiavone (first round)
10. (France) Océane Dodin (first round)
11. (China) Duan Yingying (qualified)
12. (Germany) Andrea Petkovic (qualifying competition)
13. (Spain) Sara Sorribes Tormo (qualifying competition)
14. (United States) Bernarda Pera (qualified)
15. (Croatia) Jana Fett (first round)
16. (Montenegro) Danka Kovinić (qualifying competition)

=== Qualifiers ===
1. (United States) Catherine Bellis
2. (Japan) Naomi Osaka
3. (Czech Republic) Markéta Vondroušová
4. (China) Duan Yingying
5. (United States) Bernarda Pera
6. (Ukraine) Kateryna Bondarenko
7. (Russia) Anna Blinkova
8. (Romania) Monica Niculescu

=== Draw ===
==== First qualifier ====
First round
1	(United States) Catherine Bellis	6	6
WC	(Qatar) Mubaraka Al-Naimi	0	0
(Russia) Sofya Zhuk	6	6
9	(Italy) Francesca Schiavone	3	2

Qualifying competition
1	(United States) Catherine Bellis	6	6
(Russia) Sofya Zhuk	1	3

==== Second qualifier ====
First round
2	(Japan) Naomi Osaka	6	6
(China) Lu Jingjing	3	4
(Slovakia) Michaela Hončová	4	7	1
16	(Montenegro) Danka Kovinić	6	5	6

Qualifying competition
2	(Japan) Naomi Osaka	6	6
16	(Montenegro) Danka Kovinić	3	1

==== Third qualifier ====
First round
3	(Czech Republic) Markéta Vondroušová	6	6
WC	(Germany) Sabine Lisicki	1	3
PR	(Slovakia) Kristína Kučová	6	6
10	(France) Océane Dodin	4	1

Qualifying competition
3	(Czech Republic) Markéta Vondroušová	6	6
PR	(Slovakia) Kristína Kučová	1	2

==== Fourth qualifier ====
First round
4	(Chinese Taipei) Hsieh Su-wei	4	4
WC	(Russia) Vera Zvonareva	6	6
(Czech Republic) Barbora Krejčíková	6^{3}	4
11	(China) Duan Yingying	7^{7}	6

Qualifying competition
WC	(Russia) Vera Zvonareva	6^{7}	7^{7}	3
11	(China) Duan Yingying	7^{9}	6^{5}	6

==== Fifth qualifier ====
First round
5	(United States) Christina McHale	6	6
WC	(Ukraine) Anastasiya Vasylyeva	3	0
(Czech Republic) Tereza Martincová	2	4
14	(United States) Bernarda Pera	6	6

Qualifying competition
5	(United States) Christina McHale	3	0
14	(United States) Bernarda Pera	6	6

==== Sixth qualifier ====
First round
6	(Ukraine) Kateryna Bondarenko	6	4	6
(Bulgaria) Sesil Karatantcheva	3	6	3
(United Kingdom) Naomi Broady	4	7^{7}	5
13	(Spain) Sara Sorribes Tormo	6	6^{1}	7

Qualifying competition
6	(Ukraine) Kateryna Bondarenko	6	6
13	(Spain) Sara Sorribes Tormo	4	3

==== Seventh qualifier ====
First round
7	(Russia) Ekaterina Alexandrova	6	7
(Australia) Arina Rodionova	4	5
(Russia) Anna Blinkova	6	6
15	(Croatia) Jana Fett	1	1

Qualifying competition
7	(Russia) Ekaterina Alexandrova	2	2^{r}
(Russia) Anna Blinkova	6	4

==== Eighth qualifier ====
First round
8	(Romania) Monica Niculescu	6	6
(Japan) Risa Ozaki	1	0
(China) Han Xinyun	3	1
12	(Germany) Andrea Petkovic	6	6

Qualifying competition
8	(Romania) Monica Niculescu	6	6
12	(Germany) Andrea Petkovic	4	1
