= 2018 WTA Finals – Doubles =

Doubles
- 2018 WTA Finals

Final
- Champions: (Hungary) Tímea Babos (France) Kristina Mladenovic
- Runners-up: (Czech Republic) Barbora Krejčíková (Czech Republic) Kateřina Siniaková
- Score: 6–4, 7–5

Details
- Draw: 8
- Seeds: 4

Events
Singles	Doubles
- WTA Finals

Defending champion Tímea Babos and her partner Kristina Mladenovic defeated Barbora Krejčíková and Kateřina Siniaková in the final, 6–4, 7–5 to win the doubles tennis title at the 2018 WTA Finals.

Babos and Andrea Sestini Hlaváčková were the reigning champions, but did not qualify together this year. Sestini Hlaváčková partnered Barbora Strýcová, but was defeated in the semifinals by Krejčíková and Siniaková.

Krejčiková and Siniaková secured the joint-year-end world No. 1 ranking by reaching the final. Babos and Mladenovic, alongside Strýcová, were also in contention for the year-end top ranking.

== Seeds ==
1. (Czech Republic) Barbora Krejčíková / (Czech Republic) Kateřina Siniaková (final)
2. (Hungary) Tímea Babos / (France) Kristina Mladenovic (champions)
3. (Czech Republic) Andrea Sestini Hlaváčková / (Czech Republic) Barbora Strýcová (semifinals)
4. (Belgium) Elise Mertens / (Netherlands) Demi Schuurs (quarterfinals)

== Draw ==
Key

- Q = Qualifier
- WC = Wild card
- LL = Lucky loser
- Alt = Alternate
- ITF = ITF entry
- PR = Protected ranking
- SR = Special ranking
- SE = Special exempt
- JE = Junior exempt
- JR = Junior Accelerator Programme entrant
- CO = College Accelerator Programme entrant
- NG = Next Gen Accelerator Program entrant
- w/o = Walkover
- r = Retired
- d = Defaulted

=== Draw ===
Quarterfinals
1	(Czech Republic) Barbora Krejčíková (Czech Republic) Kateřina Siniaková	6	6
(United States) Nicole Melichar (Czech Republic) Květa Peschke	1	4
3	(Czech Republic) Andrea Sestini Hlaváčková (Czech Republic) Barbora Strýcová	6	6
(Slovenia) Andreja Klepač (Spain) María José Martínez Sánchez	1	2
(Australia) Ashleigh Barty (United States) CoCo Vandeweghe	6	6
4	(Belgium) Elise Mertens (Netherlands) Demi Schuurs	1	4
(Canada) Gabriela Dabrowski (China) Xu Yifan	0	2
2	(Hungary) Tímea Babos (France) Kristina Mladenovic	6	6

Semifinals
1	(Czech Republic) Barbora Krejčíková (Czech Republic) Kateřina Siniaková	6	6
3	(Czech Republic) Andrea Sestini Hlaváčková (Czech Republic) Barbora Strýcová	3	2
(Australia) Ashleigh Barty (United States) CoCo Vandeweghe	7^{7}	3	[8]
2	(Hungary) Tímea Babos (France) Kristina Mladenovic	6^{5}	6	[10]

Final
1	(Czech Republic) Barbora Krejčíková (Czech Republic) Kateřina Siniaková	4	5
2	(Hungary) Tímea Babos (France) Kristina Mladenovic	6	7
