= Lara Schmidt =

German tennis player (born 1999)

- Country (sports): Germany
- Born: 13 October 1999 (age 26) Lauf an der Pegnitz, Germany
- Height: 1.68 m (5 ft 6 in)
- Plays: Right-handed (two-handed backhand)
- Prize money: $41,266

Singles
- Career record: 117–103
- Career titles: 2 ITF
- Highest ranking: No. 478 (22 April 2024)
- Current ranking: No. 534 (13 January 2025)

Doubles
- Career record: 5–9
- Career titles: 0
- Highest ranking: No. 928 (19 May 2025)
- Current ranking: No. 956 (13 January 2025)
- Last updated on: 13 January 2025.

Lara Schmidt (born 13 October 1999) is a German tennis player. She has a career-high WTA singles ranking of world No. 478, achieved on 22 April 2024.

Schmidt made her debut on the WTA Tour in 2016 when she received a wildcard for the qualification rounds of the 2016 Nürnberger Versicherungscup.

She made her WTA Tour main-draw debut at the 2018 Nürnberger Versicherungscup in the doubles draw, partnering Jule Niemeier.

== ITF Circuit finals ==
=== Singles: 4 (2 titles, 2 runner–ups) ===
Legend W25/W35 tournaments (2–0) W15 tournaments (0–2)	Finals by surface Hard (0–2) Clay (2–0)

Result	W–L	Date	Tournament	Tier	Surface	Opponent	Score
Loss	0–1	Mar 2022	ITF Monastir, Tunisia	W15	Hard	(Switzerland) Céline Naef	6–3, 2–6, 5–7
Win	1–1	Jul 2023	ITF Klosters, Switzerland	W25	Clay	Kristina Dmitruk	6–3, 6–2
Win	2–1	Aug 2024	ITF Verbier, Switzerland	W35	Clay	(Australia) Tina Nadine Smith	6–4, 7–5
Loss	2–2	Jan 2025	ITF Monastir, Tunisia	W15	Hard	(France) Astrid Lew Yan Foon	0–3 ret.
