= 2018 Sydney International =

- Date: 7–13 January 2018
- Edition: 126th
- Category: ATP World Tour 250 series / WTA Premier
- Draw: 32S / 16D
- Surface: Hard
- Location: Sydney, Australia
- Venue: NSW Tennis Centre

Champions

Men's singles
- (Russia) Daniil Medvedev

Women's singles
- (Germany) Angelique Kerber

Men's doubles
- (Poland) Łukasz Kubot / (Brazil) Marcelo Melo

Women's doubles
- (Canada) Gabriela Dabrowski / (China) Xu Yifan
- Sydney International

The 2018 Sydney International was a joint 2018 ATP World Tour and 2018 WTA Tour tennis tournament, played on outdoor hard courts in Sydney, New South Wales (NSW). It was the 126th edition of the tournament and took place at the NSW Tennis Centre in Sydney. It was held from 7 January through 13 January 2018 as part of the Australian Open Series in preparation for the first Grand Slam of the year. Venus Williams played the event for the first time in 17 years, 20 years after her maiden appearance.

== Point distribution ==
Event	W	F	SF	QF	Round of 16	Round of 32	Q	Q3	Q2	Q1
Men's singles	250	150	90	45	20	0	12	6	0	0
Men's doubles	250	150	90	45	0	—N/a	—N/a	—N/a	—N/a	—N/a
Women's singles	470	305	185	100	55	1	25	18	13	1
Women's doubles	470	305	185	100	1	—N/a	—N/a	—N/a	—N/a	—N/a

== Prize money ==
Event	W	F	SF	QF	Round of 16	Round of 32^{1}	Q3	Q2	Q1
Men's singles	$83,650	$44,055	$23,865	$13,595	$8,010	$4,745	$2,135	$1,070	—N/a
Men's doubles*	$25,410	$13,360	$7,240	$4,140	$2,430	—N/a	—N/a	—N/a	—N/a
Women's singles	$137,125	$73,201	$39,132	$20,970	$11,245	$6,140	$3,210	$1,705	$945
Women's doubles*	$42,850	$22,900	$12,510	$6,365	$3,460	—N/a	—N/a	—N/a	—N/a

_{^{1}Qualifiers prize money is also the Round of 32 prize money.}
_{*per team}

== ATP singles main-draw entrants ==
=== Seeds ===
Country	Player	Rank^{1}	Seed
ESP	Albert Ramos Viñolas	23	1
LUX	Gilles Müller	25	2
ARG	Diego Schwartzman	26	3
ITA	Fabio Fognini	27	4
FRA	Adrian Mannarino	28	5
GER	Philipp Kohlschreiber	29	6
BIH	Damir Džumhur	30	7
GER	Mischa Zverev	33	8

- ^{1}Ranking as of 1 January 2018.

=== Other entrants ===
The following players received wildcards into the singles main draw:

- (Australia) Alex Bolt
- (Australia) John Millman
- (Australia) Jordan Thompson

The following players received entry into the singles main draw as special exempts:

- (Australia) Alex de Minaur
- (France) Gilles Simon

The following players received entry from the qualifying draw:

- (Russia) Evgeny Donskoy
- (Russia) Daniil Medvedev
- (Australia) Alexei Popyrin
- (Australia) Aleksandar Vukic

The following player received entry as a lucky loser:

- (Lithuania) Ričardas Berankis

=== Withdrawals ===
Before the tournament

- (Serbia) Filip Krajinović → replaced by (Lithuania) Ričardas Berankis
- (Japan) Kei Nishikori → replaced by (Serbia) Viktor Troicki

=== Retirements ===
- (Bosnia and Herzegovina) Damir Džumhur

== ATP doubles main-draw entrants ==
=== Seeds ===
Country	Player	Country	Player	Rank^{1}	Seed
POL	Łukasz Kubot	BRA	Marcelo Melo	3	1
NED	Jean-Julien Rojer	ROU	Horia Tecău	15	2
ESP	Feliciano López	ESP	Marc López	44	3
IND	Rohan Bopanna	FRA	Édouard Roger-Vasselin	44	4

- ^{1} Ranking as of 1 January 2018.

=== Other entrants ===
The following pairs received wildcards into the doubles main draw:

- (Australia) Alex Bolt / (Australia) Jordan Thompson
- (Australia) Christopher O'Connell / (Australia) Matt Reid

=== Withdrawals ===
During the tournament

- (Bosnia and Herzegovina) Damir Džumhur

== WTA singles main-draw entrants ==
=== Seeds ===
Country	Player	Rank^{1}	Seed
ESP	Garbiñe Muguruza	2	1
USA	Venus Williams	5	2
LAT	Jeļena Ostapenko	7	3
GBR	Johanna Konta	9	4
FRA	Kristina Mladenovic	11	5
USA	Sloane Stephens	13	6
~~GER~~	~~Julia Görges~~	~~14~~	~~7~~
LAT	Anastasija Sevastova	16	8

- ^{1}Ranking as of 1 January 2018.

=== Other entrants ===
The following players received wildcards into the singles main draw:

- (Spain) Garbiñe Muguruza
- (Australia) Ellen Perez
- (Australia) Olivia Rogowska
- (Australia) Samantha Stosur

The following players received entry from the qualifying draw:

- (United States) Kristie Ahn
- (United States) Catherine Bellis
- (Paraguay) Verónica Cepede Royg
- (Italy) Camila Giorgi

The following players received entry as lucky losers:

- (Spain) Lara Arruabarrena
- (Germany) Carina Witthöft

=== Withdrawals ===
Before the tournament

- (Germany) Julia Görges → replaced by (Germany) Carina Witthöft
- (Russia) Anastasia Pavlyuchenkova → replaced by (Russia) Ekaterina Makarova
- (China) Peng Shuai → replaced by (Spain) Lara Arruabarrena

During the tournament

- (Spain) Garbiñe Muguruza

=== Retirements ===
- (Croatia) Mirjana Lučić-Baroni
- (France) Kristina Mladenovic

== WTA doubles main-draw entrants ==
=== Seeds ===
Country	Player	Country	Player	Rank^{1}	Seed
TPE	Latisha Chan	CZE	Andrea Sestini Hlaváčková	6	1
CZE	Lucie Šafářová	CZE	Barbora Strýcová	21	2
CAN	Gabriela Dabrowski	CHN	Xu Yifan	34	3
NED	Kiki Bertens	SWE	Johanna Larsson	39	4

- ^{1}Ranking as of 1 January 2018.

=== Other entrants ===
The following team received entry as alternates:

- (Spain) Lara Arruabarrena / (United States) Lauren Davis

=== Withdrawals ===
Before the tournament

- (Russia) Elena Vesnina

During the tournament

- (Czech Republic) Barbora Strýcová

== Champions ==
=== Men's singles ===
- (Russia) Daniil Medvedev def. (Australia) Alex de Minaur, 1–6, 6–4, 7–5

=== Women's singles ===
- (Germany) Angelique Kerber def. (Australia) Ashleigh Barty, 6–4, 6–4

=== Men's doubles ===
- (Poland) Łukasz Kubot / (Brazil) Marcelo Melo def. (Germany) Jan-Lennard Struff / (Serbia) Viktor Troicki, 6–3, 6–4.

=== Women's doubles ===
- (Canada) Gabriela Dabrowski / (China) Xu Yifan def. (Chinese Taipei) Latisha Chan / (Czech Republic) Andrea Sestini Hlaváčková, 6–3, 6–1
