= 2018 Volvo Car Open =

- Date: April 2–8
- Edition: 46th
- Category: WTA Premier
- Draw: 56S / 16D
- Prize money: $776,000
- Surface: Green clay / outdoor
- Location: Charleston, United States
- Venue: Family Circle Tennis Center

Champions

Singles
- (Netherlands) Kiki Bertens

Doubles
- (Russia) Alla Kudryavtseva / (Slovenia) Katarina Srebotnik
← 2017 ·	Charleston Open	· 2019 →

The 2018 Volvo Car Open was a women's tennis event on the 2018 WTA Tour. It took place between April 2 and April 8, 2018 and was the 46th edition of the Charleston Open tournament and a Premier level tournament. The event took place at the Family Circle Tennis Center, on Daniel Island, Charleston, United States. It was the only event of the clay court season played on green clay. Kiki Bertens, seeded 12th, won the singles title.

== Finals ==
=== Singles ===
(Netherlands) Kiki Bertens defeated (Germany) Julia Görges, 6–2, 6–1

- It was Bertens' 1st singles title of the year and the 5th of her career.

=== Doubles ===
(Russia) Alla Kudryavtseva / (Slovenia) Katarina Srebotnik defeated (Slovenia) Andreja Klepač / (Spain) María José Martínez Sánchez, 6–3, 6–3

== Points and prize money ==
=== Point distribution ===
Event	W	F	SF	QF	Round of 16	Round of 32	Round of 64	Q	Q2	Q1
Singles	470	305	185	100	55	30	1	25	13	1
Doubles	470	305	185	100	1	—	—	—	—	—

=== Prize money ===
Event	W	F	SF	QF	Round of 16	Round of 32	Round of 64	Q2	Q1
Singles	$137,125	$72,841	$35,890	$18,387	$9,568	$4,898	$2,516	$1,150	$700
Doubles	$42,850	$22,900	$12,510	$6,365	$3,460	—	—	—	—

== Singles main draw entrants ==
=== Seeds ===
Country	Player	Ranking^{1}	Seed
FRA	Caroline Garcia	7	1
CZE	Petra Kvitová	9	2
RUS	Daria Kasatkina	11	3
~~USA~~	~~Sloane Stephens~~	~~12~~	~~4~~
GER	Julia Görges	13	5
GBR	Johanna Konta	14	6
USA	Madison Keys	15	7
LAT	Anastasija Sevastova	17	8
AUS	Ashleigh Barty	20	9
JPN	Naomi Osaka	22	10
AUS	Daria Gavrilova	26	11
NED	Kiki Bertens	29	12
ROU	Irina-Camelia Begu	37	13
FRA	Alizé Cornet	38	14
ROU	Mihaela Buzărnescu	39	15
RUS	Elena Vesnina	43	16

- ^{1} Rankings as of March 19, 2018.

=== Other entrants ===
The following players received wildcards into the main draw:

- (Italy) Sara Errani
- (United States) Bethanie Mattek-Sands

The following players received entry from the qualifying draw:

- (United States) Francesca Di Lorenzo
- (United States) Caroline Dolehide
- (Spain) Georgina García Pérez
- (Belarus) Vera Lapko
- (United States) Claire Liu
- (Spain) Sílvia Soler Espinosa
- (Hungary) Fanny Stollár
- (Belgium) Maryna Zanevska

The following player received entry as a lucky loser:

- (Ukraine) Dayana Yastremska

=== Withdrawals ===
Before the tournament

- (United States) Catherine Bellis → replaced by (United States) Kristie Ahn
- (Estonia) Kaia Kanepi → replaced by (Slovenia) Polona Hercog
- (Croatia) Ana Konjuh → replaced by (Germany) Andrea Petkovic
- (Croatia) Petra Martić → replaced by (United States) Sofia Kenin
- (United States) Shelby Rogers → replaced by (United States) Jennifer Brady
- (Czech Republic) Lucie Šafářová → replaced by (United States) Taylor Townsend
- (Greece) Maria Sakkari → replaced by (United States) Bernarda Pera
- (United States) Sloane Stephens → replaced by (Ukraine) Dayana Yastremska
- (Czech Republic) Barbora Strýcová → replaced by (Russia) Natalia Vikhlyantseva

=== Retirements ===
- (Brazil) Beatriz Haddad Maia
- (Belarus) Vera Lapko

== Doubles main draw entrants ==
=== Seeds ===
Country	Player	Country	Player	Rank^{1}	Seed
CAN	Gabriela Dabrowski	CHN	Xu Yifan	16	1
USA	Bethanie Mattek-Sands	CZE	Andrea Sestini Hlaváčková	33	2
SLO	Andreja Klepač	ESP	María José Martínez Sánchez	42	3
CZE	Barbora Krejčíková	CZE	Kateřina Siniaková	44	4

- ^{1} Rankings as of March 19, 2018.

=== Other entrants ===
The following pairs received wildcards into the doubles main draw:

- (Spain) Lara Arruabarrena / (Italy) Sara Errani
- (Japan) Misaki Doi / (United States) Christina McHale
