= 2018 Nürnberger Versicherungscup =

- Date: 21–26 May
- Edition: 6th
- Category: WTA International
- Draw: 32S / 16D
- Prize money: € 250,000
- Surface: Clay / outdoor
- Location: Nuremberg, Germany
- Venue: Tennis-Club 1. FC Nürnberg

Champions

Singles
- (Sweden) Johanna Larsson

Doubles
- (Netherlands) Demi Schuurs / (Slovenia) Katarina Srebotnik
← 2017 ·	Nürnberger Versicherungscup	· 2019 →

The 2018 Nürnberger Versicherungscup was a professional women's tennis tournament played on outdoor clay courts. It was the sixth edition of the tournament, and part of the WTA International series of the 2018 WTA Tour. It took place at the Tennis-Club 1. FC Nürnberg in Nuremberg, Germany, between 21 May and 26 May 2018. Unseeded Johanna Larsson won the singles title.

== Finals ==
=== Singles ===
(Sweden) Johanna Larsson defeated (United States) Alison Riske, 7–6^{(7–4)}, 6–4

- It was Larsson's only singles title of the year and the 2nd and last of her career.

=== Doubles ===
(Netherlands) Demi Schuurs / (Slovenia) Katarina Srebotnik defeated (Belgium) Kirsten Flipkens / (Sweden) Johanna Larsson, 3–6, 6–3, [10–7]

- It was Schuurs' 4th doubles title of the year and the 7th of her career. It was Srebotnik's 2nd and last doubles title of the year and the 39th and last of her career.

== Points and prize money ==
Event	W	F	SF	QF	Round of 16	Round of 32	Q	Q2	Q1
Singles	280	180	110	60	30	1	18	12	1
Doubles	280	180	110	60	1	—	—	—	—

=== Prize money ===
Event'	W	F	SF	QF	Round of 16	Round of 32	Q2	Q1
Singles	$43,000	$21,400	$11,500	$6,175	$3,400	$2,100	$1,020	$600
Doubles	$12,300	$6,400	$3,435	$1,820	$960	—	—	—

== Singles main draw entrants ==
=== Seeds ===
Country	Player	Rank^{1}	Seed
USA	Sloane Stephens	10	1
GER	Julia Görges	11	2
NED	Kiki Bertens	15	3
CHN	Zhang Shuai	27	4
ROU	Irina-Camelia Begu	41	5
ROU	Sorana Cîrstea	43	6
BEL	Alison Van Uytvanck	49	7
CZE	Kateřina Siniaková	57	8

- Rankings are as of 14 May 2018.

=== Other entrants ===
The following players received wildcards into the singles main draw:

- (Germany) Katharina Hobgarski
- (Germany) Andrea Petkovic
- (United States) Sloane Stephens

The following players using a protected ranking into the singles main draw:

- (China) Zheng Saisai

The following players received entry from the qualifying draw:

- (Slovakia) Kristína Kučová
- (Luxembourg) Mandy Minella
- (Argentina) Nadia Podoroska
- (Serbia) Dejana Radanović
- (Hungary) Fanny Stollár
- (Germany) Anna Zaja

=== Withdrawals ===
Before the tournament

- (Romania) Ana Bogdan → replaced by (Paraguay) Verónica Cepede Royg
- (Slovenia) Polona Hercog → replaced by (United States) Christina McHale

=== Retirements ===
- (Romania) Irina-Camelia Begu
- (Romania) Sorana Cîrstea

== Doubles main draw entrants ==
=== Seeds ===
Country	Player	Country	Player	Rank^{1}	Seed
USA	Nicole Melichar	CZE	Květa Peschke	54	1
BEL	Kirsten Flipkens	SWE	Johanna Larsson	58	2
NED	Demi Schuurs	SLO	Katarina Srebotnik	70	3
NED	Lesley Kerkhove	BLR	Lidziya Marozava	118	4

- ^{1} Rankings as of 14 May 2018.

=== Other entrants ===
The following pairs received wildcards into the doubles main draw:

- (Germany) Katharina Gerlach / (Germany) Lena Rüffer
- (Germany) Jule Niemeier / (Germany) Lara Schmidt
