= 2018 Qatar Total Open =

- Date: 12–17 February
- Edition: 16th
- Category: WTA Premier 5
- Draw: 56S / 28D
- Prize money: $2,666,000
- Surface: Hard
- Location: Doha, Qatar
- Venue: Khalifa International Tennis and Squash Complex

Champions

Singles
- (Czech Republic) Petra Kvitová

Doubles
- (Canada) Gabriela Dabrowski / (Latvia) Jeļena Ostapenko
| ← 2017 · | Qatar Open | · 2019 → |

The 2018 Qatar Total Open was a professional women's tennis tournament played on hard courts. It was the 16th edition of the event and a WTA Premier 5 tournament on the 2018 WTA Tour. It took place at the International Tennis and Squash complex in Doha, Qatar between 12 and 17 February 2018.

== Points and prize money ==
=== Point distribution ===
| Event | W | F | SF | QF | Round of 16 | Round of 32 | Round of 56 | Q | Q2 | Q1 |
| Singles | 900 | 585 | 350 | 190 | 105 | 60 | 1 | 30 | 20 | 1 |
| Doubles | 900 | 585 | 350 | 190 | 105 | 1 | — | — | — | — |

=== Prize money ===
| Event | W | F | SF | QF | Round of 16 | Round of 32 | Round of 56 | Q2 | Q1 |
| Singles | $591,750 | $295,900 | $147,750 | $68,125 | $33,750 | $17,325 | $8,900 | $4,955 | $2,550 |
| Doubles* | $169,280 | $85,600 | $42,360 | $21,235 | $10,805 | $5,335 | — | — | — |

_{*per team}

== Singles main-draw entrants ==
=== Seeds ===
| Country | Player | Rank^{1} | Seed |
|---|---|---|---|
| DEN | Caroline Wozniacki | 1 | 1 |
| ROU | Simona Halep | 2 | 2 |
| UKR | Elina Svitolina | 3 | 3 |
| ESP | Garbiñe Muguruza | 4 | 4 |
| CZE | Karolína Plíšková | 5 | 5 |
| LAT | Jeļena Ostapenko | 6 | 6 |
| FRA | Caroline Garcia | 7 | 7 |
| GER | Angelique Kerber | 9 | 8 |
| GER | Julia Görges | 10 | 9 |
| GBR | Johanna Konta | 11 | 10 |
| FRA | Kristina Mladenovic | 13 | 11 |
| USA | Madison Keys | 14 | 12 |
| LAT | Anastasija Sevastova | 15 | 13 |
| SVK | Magdaléna Rybáriková | 18 | 14 |
| BEL | Elise Mertens | 20 | 15 |
| CZE | Petra Kvitová | 21 | 16 |

- ^{1} Rankings as of February 5, 2018.

=== Other entrants ===
The following players received wildcards into the singles main draw:

- (Oman) Fatma Al-Nabhani
- (Turkey) Çağla Büyükakçay
- (Tunisia) Ons Jabeur
- (Russia) Maria Sharapova

The following players received entry from the qualifying draw:

- (United States) Catherine Bellis
- (Russia) Anna Blinkova
- (Ukraine) Kateryna Bondarenko
- (China) Duan Yingying
- (Romania) Monica Niculescu
- (Japan) Naomi Osaka
- (United States) Bernarda Pera
- (Czech Republic) Markéta Vondroušová

=== Withdrawals ===
Before the tournament

- (Australia) Ashleigh Barty → replaced by (Croatia) Donna Vekić
- (Croatia) Ana Konjuh → replaced by (Serbia) Aleksandra Krunić
- (Croatia) Mirjana Lučić-Baroni → replaced by (Hungary) Tímea Babos
- (United States) CoCo Vandeweghe → replaced by (Germany) Mona Barthel

During the tournament

- (Romania) Simona Halep

=== Retirements ===
- (Germany) Julia Görges
- (Russia) Daria Kasatkina
- (Slovakia) Magdaléna Rybáriková

== Doubles main-draw entrants ==
=== Seeds ===
| Country | Player | Country | Player | Rank^{1} | Seed |
|---|---|---|---|---|---|
| RUS | Ekaterina Makarova | RUS | Elena Vesnina | 6 | 1 |
| TPE | Latisha Chan | CZE | Andrea Sestini Hlaváčková | 7 | 2 |
| CZE | Lucie Šafářová | CZE | Barbora Strýcová | 22 | 3 |
| HUN | Tímea Babos | FRA | Kristina Mladenovic | 24 | 4 |
| TPE | Hsieh Su-wei | CHN | Peng Shuai | 41 | 5 |
| ~~ROU~~ | ~~Irina-Camelia Begu~~ | ~~ROU~~ | ~~Monica Niculescu~~ | ~~44~~ | ~~6~~ |
| TPE | Chan Hao-ching | CHN | Yang Zhaoxuan | 49 | 7 |
| SLO | Andreja Klepač | ESP | María José Martínez Sánchez | 50 | 8 |

- Rankings are as of February 5, 2018.

=== Other entrants ===
The following pairs received wildcards into the doubles main draw:

- (Oman) Fatma Al-Nabhani / (Indonesia) Jessy Rompies
- (Qatar) Mubaraka Al-Naimi / (Tunisia) Ons Jabeur
- (Slovakia) Dominika Cibulková / (Russia) Vera Zvonareva

The following pairs received entry as alternates:

- (Germany) Mona Barthel / (Germany) Carina Witthöft

=== Withdrawals ===
Before the tournament

- (Romania) Irina-Camelia Begu

=== Retirements ===
- (Czech Republic) Barbora Strýcová

== Champions ==
=== Singles ===
- (Czech Republic) Petra Kvitová def. (Spain) Garbiñe Muguruza, 3–6, 6–3, 6–4

It was Kvitová's first Doha title and second of the year and 22nd WTA title overall.

=== Doubles ===
- (Canada) Gabriela Dabrowski / (Latvia) Jeļena Ostapenko def. (Slovenia) Andreja Klepač / (Spain) María José Martínez Sánchez, 6–3, 6–3
