= Kirsten Flipkens career statistics =

Career finals
| Discipline | Type | Won | Lost | Total |
|---|---|---|---|---|
| Singles | Grand Slam | – | – | – |
| Singles | WTA Finals | – | – | – |
| Singles | WTA 1000 | – | – | – |
| Singles | WTA 500/250 | 1 | 3 | 4 |
| Singles | Olympics | – | – | – |
| Singles | Total | 1 | 3 | 4 |
| Doubles | Grand Slam | – | – | – |
| Doubles | WTA Finals | – | – | – |
| Doubles | WTA 1000 | – | – | – |
| Doubles | WTA 500/250 | 7 | 8 | 15 |
| Doubles | Olympics | – | – | – |
| Doubles | Total | 7 | 8 | 15 |
| Mixed | Grand Slam | 0 | 1 | 1 |
| Mixed | Olympics | – | – | – |
| Mixed | Total | 0 | 1 | 1 |

This is a list of the main career statistics of professional Belgian tennis player Kirsten Flipkens.

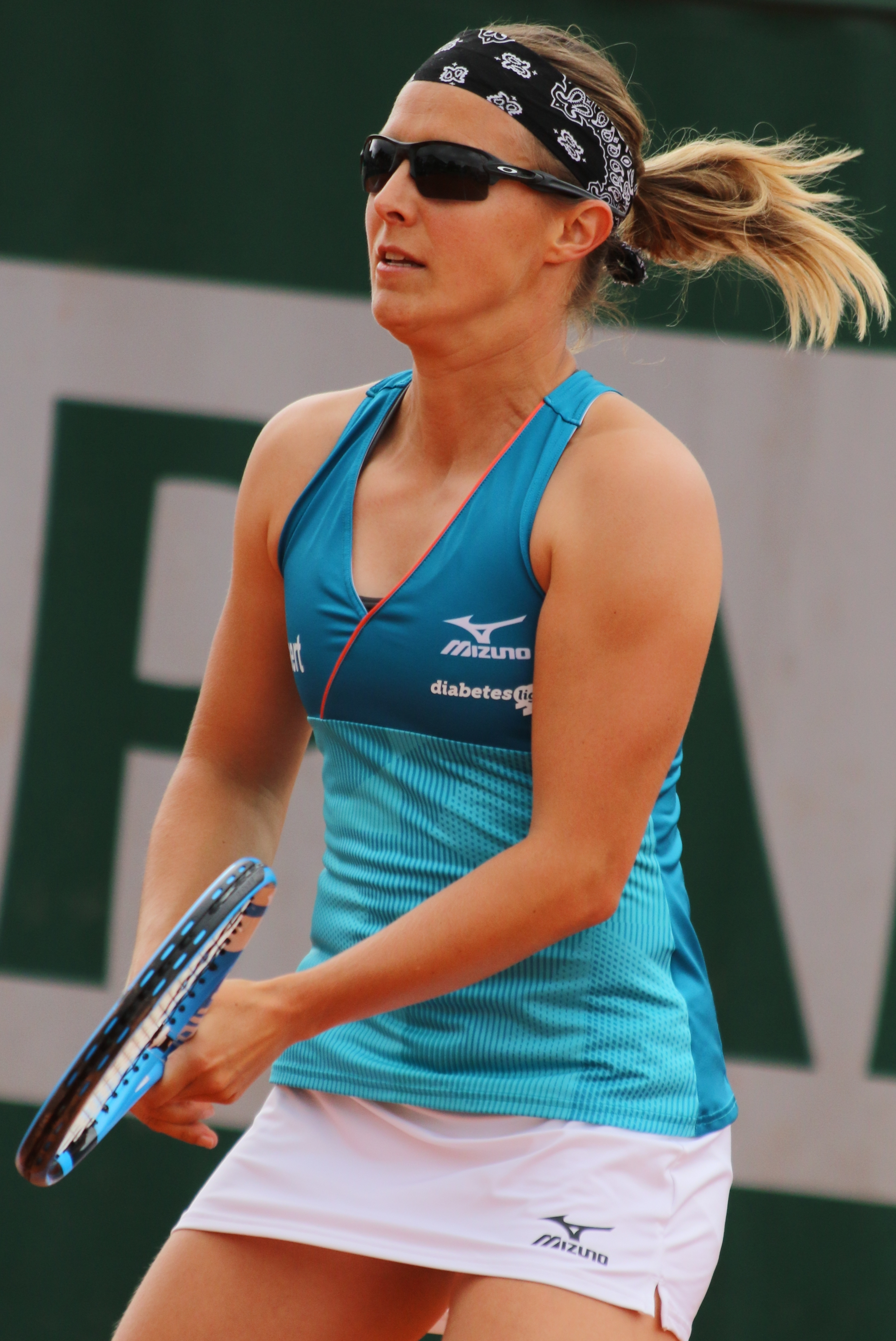
Flipkens at the 2019 French Open

== Performance timelines ==
Key
| W | F | SF | QF | #R | RR | Q# | P# | DNQ | A | Z# | PO | G | S | B | NMS | NTI | P | NH |

(W) winner; (F) finalist; (SF) semifinalist; (QF) quarterfinalist; (#R) rounds 4, 3, 2, 1; (RR) round-robin stage; (Q#) qualification round; (P#) preliminary round; (DNQ) did not qualify; (A) absent; (Z#) Davis/Fed Cup Zonal Group (with number indication) or (PO) play-off; (G) gold, (S) silver or (B) bronze Olympic/Paralympic medal; (NMS) not a Masters tournament; (NTI) not a Tier I tournament; (P) postponed; (NH) not held; (SR) strike rate (events won / competed); (W–L) win–loss record.
To avoid confusion and double counting, these charts are updated at the conclusion of a tournament or when the player's participation has ended.

Only main-draw results in WTA Tour, Grand Slam tournaments, Fed Cup/Billie Jean King Cup and Olympic Games are included in win–loss records.

=== Singles ===
| Tournament | 2003 | 2004 | 2005 | 2006 | 2007 | 2008 | 2009 | 2010 | 2011 | 2012 | 2013 | 2014 | 2015 | 2016 | 2017 | 2018 | 2019 | 2020 | 2021 | 2022 | SR | W–L | Win % |
|---|---|---|---|---|---|---|---|---|---|---|---|---|---|---|---|---|---|---|---|---|---|---|---|
Grand Slam tournaments
| Australian Open | A | A | A | A | 1R | A | 2R | 1R | 1R | Q3 | 4R | 2R | 1R | 2R | 1R | 2R | 1R | 1R | 1R | 1R | 0 / 14 | 7–14 | 33% |
| French Open | A | A | Q1 | 2R | A | Q2 | 2R | 2R | 1R | A | 2R | 2R | 1R | 1R | 2R | 2R | 1R | 1R | A | A | 0 / 12 | 7–12 | 37% |
| Wimbledon | A | Q2 | Q3 | 1R | A | Q2 | 3R | 2R | 1R | A | SF | 3R | 2R | 2R | 2R | 2R | 2R | NH | A | 2R | 0 / 12 | 16–12 | 57% |
| US Open | A | A | Q1 | 2R | A | Q2 | 3R | 1R | Q1 | 2R | 1R | 1R | 1R | 1R | 2R | 2R | 2R | 2R | A | RT | 0 / 12 | 8–12 | 40% |
| Win–loss | 0–0 | 0–0 | 0–0 | 2–3 | 0–1 | 0–0 | 6–4 | 2–4 | 0–3 | 1–1 | 9–4 | 4–4 | 1–4 | 2–4 | 3–4 | 4–4 | 2–4 | 1–3 | 0–1 | 1–2 | 0 / 50 | 38–50 | 43% |
National representation
| Summer Olympics | NH | A | NH | | | A | NH | | | A | NH | | | 3R | NH | | | | A | NH | 0 / 1 | 2–1 | 67% |
| Billie Jean King Cup (Note: Formerly known as Fed Cup until 2020.) | SF | QF | 1R | F | 1R | WG2 | WG2 | PO | SF | 1R | WG2 | A | POZ | PO2 | PO | 1R | 1R | RR | | | 0 / 9 | 14–20 | 41% |
WTA 1000
| Dubai / Qatar Open (Note: The first Premier 5 event of the year has switched back and forth between the Dubai Tennis Championships and the Qatar Ladies Open since 2009. Dubai was classified as a Premier 5 event from 2009 to 2011 before being succeeded by Doha for the 2012–2014 period. In 2015, Dubai regained its Premier 5 status while Doha was demoted to Premier status. The Premier 5 tournaments were reclassified as WTA 1000 tournaments in 2021.) | NMS | | | | | A | A | 2R | Q1 | A | A | 1R | 1R | 1R | A | A | A | 1R | A | Q2 | 0 / 5 | 1–5 | 17% |
| Indian Wells Open | A | A | A | A | Q1 | A | A | 3R | 1R | A | 3R | 2R | 2R | Q2 | 2R | 1R | 2R | NH | 1R | Q2 | 0 / 9 | 6–9 | 40% |
| Miami Open | A | A | A | A | A | A | A | Q2 | Q2 | A | QF | 4R | 1R | 2R | 3R | 2R | 1R | NH | 2R | 1R | 0 / 9 | 8–9 | 47% |
| Madrid Open | NH | | | | | | A | 1R | A | A | 2R | 1R | A | A | Q1 | Q2 | 1R | NH | A | A | 0 / 4 | 1–4 | 20% |
| Italian Open | A | A | A | A | A | A | A | A | Q1 | A | 1R | 1R | A | A | A | A | A | A | A | A | 0 / 2 | 0–2 | 0% |
| Canadian Open | A | A | A | A | A | A | A | A | A | A | 3R | 1R | A | A | 2R | 1R | A | NH | A | RT | 0 / 4 | 3–4 | 43% |
| Cincinnati Open | NMS/NH | | | | | | A | A | A | A | 1R | 2R | A | Q1 | Q2 | Q1 | A | 2R | A | RT | 0 / 3 | 2–3 | 40% |
| Pan Pacific / Wuhan Open (Note: In 2014, the Pan Pacific Open was downgraded to a Premier event and replaced by the Wuhan Open. The Premier 5 tournaments were reclassified as WTA 1000 tournaments in 2021.) | A | A | A | A | A | A | A | Q1 | A | A | 2R | 3R | A | A | A | 1R | A | NH | | | 0 / 3 | 3–3 | 50% |
| China Open | NMS/NH | | | | | | A | A | A | A | 1R | 1R | A | A | A | 2R | A | NH | | | 0 / 3 | 1–3 | 25% |
Career statistics
| | 2003 | 2004 | 2005 | 2006 | 2007 | 2008 | 2009 | 2010 | 2011 | 2012 | 2013 | 2014 | 2015 | 2016 | 2017 | 2018 | 2019 | 2020 | 2021 | 2022 | SR | W–L | Win % |
| Tournaments | 2 | 2 | 2 | 5 | 2 | 2 | 10 | 15 | 9 | 5 | 23 | 26 | 17 | 21 | 20 | 20 | 22 | 8 | 6 | 5 | Career total: 222 | | |
| Titles | 0 | 0 | 0 | 0 | 0 | 0 | 0 | 0 | 0 | 1 | 0 | 0 | 0 | 0 | 0 | 0 | 0 | 0 | 0 | 0 | Career total: 1 | | |
| Finals | 0 | 0 | 0 | 0 | 0 | 0 | 0 | 0 | 0 | 1 | 1 | 0 | 0 | 1 | 0 | 1 | 0 | 0 | 0 | 0 | Career total: 4 | | |
| Hard win–loss | 0–3 | 2–2 | 1–2 | 4–5 | 0–4 | 0–0 | 6–5 | 10–8 | 1–3 | 10–5 | 19–15 | 16–19 | 13–14 | 18–14 | 11–13 | 9–13 | 13–13 | 3–6 | 1–6 | 0–2 | 1 / 142 | 137–152 | 48% |
| Clay win–loss | 0–0 | 1–2 | 0–1 | 1–1 | 0–0 | 1–3 | 1–4 | 2–5 | 3–4 | 0–0 | 3–6 | 1–4 | 0–1 | 1–4 | 3–4 | 7–5 | 0–5 | 0–2 | 0–0 | 0–0 | 0 / 47 | 24–51 | 32% |
| Grass win–loss | 0–0 | 0–0 | 0–0 | 0–1 | 0–0 | 0–0 | 2–2 | 4–3 | 2–3 | 3–1 | 10–3 | 5–3 | 1–2 | 4–3 | 3–3 | 5–2 | 3–4 | 0–0 | 0–0 | 5–3 | 0 / 33 | 47–33 | 59% |
| Overall win–loss | 0–3 | 3–4 | 1–3 | 5–7 | 0–4 | 1–3 | 9–11 | 16–16 | 6–10 | 13–6 | 32–24 | 22–26 | 14–17 | 23–21 | 17–20 | 21–20 | 16–22 | 3–8 | 1–6 | 5–5 | 1 / 222 | 208–236 | 47% |
| Win (%) | 0% | 43% | 25% | 42% | 0% | 25% | 45% | 50% | 38% | 68% | 57% | 46% | 45% | 52% | 46% | 51% | 42% | 27% | 14% | 50% | Career total: 47% | | |
| Year-end ranking | 363 | 169 | 201 | 105 | 363 | 104 | 81 | 77 | 194 | 54 | 20 | 46 | 93 | 63 | 76 | 48 | 95 | 85 | 305 | 241 | $5,577,420 | | |

=== Doubles ===
| Tournament | 2002 | 2003 | 2004 | 2005 | 2006 | 2007 | 2008 | 2009 | 2010 | 2011 | 2012 | 2013 | 2014 | 2015 | 2016 | 2017 | 2018 | 2019 | 2020 | 2021 | 2022 | 2023 | SR | W–L | Win% |
|---|---|---|---|---|---|---|---|---|---|---|---|---|---|---|---|---|---|---|---|---|---|---|---|---|---|
Grand Slam tournaments
| Australian Open | A | A | A | A | A | A | A | A | 1R | 1R | A | 1R | 1R | 2R | 3R | 2R | 1R | 3R | 2R | 2R | QF | 1R | 0 / 13 | 11–13 | 46% |
| French Open | A | A | A | A | A | A | A | A | 1R | A | A | A | 2R | A | 2R | QF | 2R | SF | 2R | A | 2R | 2R | 0 / 9 | 13–9 | 59% |
| Wimbledon | A | A | A | A | A | A | A | A | 1R | A | A | 2R | 1R | A | 1R | 3R | 3R | 2R | NH | A | 3R | 3R | 0 / 9 | 10–9 | 53% |
| US Open | A | A | A | A | A | A | A | A | 1R | A | 1R | 2R | 1R | 2R | 1R | 1R | 1R | 1R | 1R | A | QF | A | 0 / 11 | 5–11 | 31% |
| Win–loss | 0–0 | 0–0 | 0–0 | 0–0 | 0–0 | 0–0 | 0–0 | 0–0 | 0–4 | 0–1 | 0–1 | 2–3 | 1–4 | 2–2 | 3–4 | 6–4 | 3–4 | 7–4 | 2–3 | 1–1 | 9–4 | 3–3 | 0 / 42 | 39–42 | 48% |
WTA 1000
| Dubai / Qatar Open | A | A | A | A | A | A | A | A | A | A | A | A | 1R | A | A | A | A | A | 2R | A | QF | | | 3–3 | |
| Indian Wells Open | A | A | A | A | A | A | A | A | A | A | A | A | A | A | 1R | A | 1R | 2R | A | 1R | 2R | | | 2–5 | |
| Miami Open | A | A | A | A | A | A | A | A | 2R | A | A | A | 1R | A | A | A | 1R | 1R | A | 1R | QF | | | 3–6 | |
| Madrid Open | A | A | A | A | A | A | A | A | A | A | A | A | A | A | A | A | A | 1R | A | A | 2R | | | 1–2 | |
| Italian Open | A | A | A | A | A | A | A | A | A | A | A | A | A | A | A | A | A | A | A | A | 1R | | | 0–1 | |
| Canadian Open | A | A | A | A | A | A | A | A | A | A | A | 1R | 1R | A | A | 1R | 2R | QF | A | A | 1R | | | 2–6 | |
| Cincinnati Open | A | A | A | A | A | A | A | A | A | A | A | 2R* | A | A | 1R | 1R | 1R | A | 1R | A | 1R | | | 1–5 | |
| Pan Pacific / Wuhan Open | A | A | A | A | A | A | A | A | A | A | A | QF* | A | A | A | A | 1R | A | A | A | A | | | 1–1 | |
| China Open | A | A | A | A | A | A | A | A | A | A | A | A | A | A | A | A | 1R | A | A | A | A | | | 0–1 | |
Career statistics
| | 2002 | 2003 | 2004 | 2005 | 2006 | 2007 | 2008 | 2009 | 2010 | 2011 | 2012 | 2013 | 2014 | 2015 | 2016 | 2017 | 2018 | 2019 | 2020 | 2021 | 2022 | 2023 | SR | W–L | Win% |
| Tournaments | 1 | 2 | 0 | 2 | 3 | 0 | 1 | 2 | 5 | 2 | 1 | 8 | 11 | 5 | 12 | 15 | 19 | 18 | 9 | 5 | 18 | 3 | | | |
| Titles | | | | | | | | | | | | | | | | | | | | | | | | | |
| Finals | | | | | | | | | | | | | | | | | | | | | | | | | |
| Overall win–loss | 0–1 | 1–2 | 0–2 | 0–3 | 1–4 | 0–0 | 0–1 | 2–2 | 1–6 | 2–4 | 0–1 | 5–6 | 3–10 | 4–4 | 13–10 | 22–11 | 25–18 | 27–18 | 9–8 | 1–6 | 23–18 | 5–2 | | | |
| Year-end ranking | | | | | | | | | | | | | | | | | | | | | | | | | |

=== Mixed doubles ===
| Tournament | 2013 | ... | 2017 | 2018 | 2019 | 2020 | 2021 | 2022 | SR | W–L | Win % |
|---|---|---|---|---|---|---|---|---|---|---|---|
| Australian Open | A | | A | A | A | 1R | A | 1R | 0 / 2 | 0–2 | 0% |
| French Open | 1R | | A | A | A | NH | A | A | 0 / 1 | 0–1 | 0% |
| Wimbledon | A | | 2R | 3R | A | NH | A | A | 0 / 2 | 3–2 | 60% |
| US Open | A | | A | A | 2R | NH | A | F | 0 / 2 | 5–2 | 71% |
| Win–loss | 0–1 | | 1–1 | 2–1 | 1–1 | 0–1 | 0–0 | 4–2 | 0 / 7 | 8–7 | 53% |

== Grand Slam tournaments ==
=== Mixed doubles: 1 (runner-up) ===
| Result | Year | Championship | Surface | Partner | Opponents | Score |
|---|---|---|---|---|---|---|
| Loss | 2022 | US Open | Hard | (France) Édouard Roger-Vasselin | (Australia) Storm Sanders (Australia) John Peers | 6–4, 4–6, [7–10] |

== WTA Tour finals ==
=== Singles: 4 (1 title, 3 runner-ups) ===
| Legend Grand Slam WTA 1000 WTA 500 WTA 250 (1–3) | Finals by surface Hard (0–1) Grass (0–2) Clay (0–0) Carpet (1–0) |

| Result | W–L | Date | Tournament | Tier | Surface | Opponent | Score |
|---|---|---|---|---|---|---|---|
| Win | 1–0 | Sep 2012 | Tournoi de Québec, Canada | International (Note: The WTA International tournaments were reclassified as WTA 250 tournaments in 2021.) | Carpet (i) | (Czech Republic) Lucie Hradecká | 6–1, 7–5 |
| Loss | 1–1 | Jun 2013 | Rosmalen Open, Netherlands | International | Grass | (Romania) Simona Halep | 4–6, 2–6 |
| Loss | 1–2 | Mar 2016 | Monterrey Open, Mexico | International | Hard | (United Kingdom) Heather Watson | 6–3, 2–6, 3–6 |
| Loss | 1–3 | Jun 2018 | Rosmalen Open, Netherlands | International | Grass | (Serbia) Aleksandra Krunić | 7–6^{(7–0)}, 5–7, 1–6 |

=== Doubles: 15 (7 titles, 8 runner–ups) ===
| Legend Grand Slam WTA 1000 WTA 500 (0–2) WTA 250 (7–6) | Finals by surface Hard (4–4) Grass (2–2) Clay (1–2) Carpet (0–0) |

| Result | W–L | Date | Tournament | Tier | Surface | Partner | Opponent | Score |
|---|---|---|---|---|---|---|---|---|
| Win | 1–0 | Sep 2016 | Korea Open, South Korea | International | Hard | (Sweden) Johanna Larsson | (Japan) Akiko Omae (Thailand) Peangtarn Plipuech | 6–2, 6–3 |
| Loss | 1–1 | May 2017 | Nuremberg Cup, Germany | International | Clay | (Sweden) Johanna Larsson | (United States) Nicole Melichar (United Kingdom) Anna Smith | 6–3, 3–6, [9–11] |
| Win | 2–1 | Jun 2017 | Rosmalen Open, Netherlands | International | Grass | (Slovakia) Dominika Cibulková | (Netherlands) Kiki Bertens (Netherlands) Demi Schuurs | 4–6, 6–4, [10–6] |
| Loss | 2–2 | Oct 2017 | Luxembourg Open, Luxembourg | International | Hard (i) | (Canada) Eugenie Bouchard | (Netherlands) Lesley Kerkhove (Belarus) Lidziya Marozava | 7–6^{(7–4)}, 4–6, [6–10] |
| Loss | 2–3 | Feb 2018 | Hungarian Ladies Open, Hungary | International | Hard (i) | (Sweden) Johanna Larsson | (Spain) Georgina García Pérez (Hungary) Fanny Stollár | 6–4, 4–6, [3–10] |
| Win | 3–3 | Apr 2018 | Ladies Open Lugano, Switzerland | International | Clay | (Belgium) Elise Mertens | (Belarus) Vera Lapko (Belarus) Aryna Sabalenka | 6–1, 6–3 |
| Loss | 3–4 | May 2018 | Nuremberg Cup, Germany | International | Clay | (Sweden) Johanna Larsson | (Netherlands) Demi Schuurs (Slovenia) Katarina Srebotnik | 6–3, 3–6, [7–10] |
| Loss | 3–5 | Jun 2018 | Rosmalen Open, Netherlands | International | Grass | (Netherlands) Kiki Bertens | (Belgium) Elise Mertens (Netherlands) Demi Schuurs | 3–3 ret. |
| Win | 4–5 | Oct 2018 | Linz Open, Austria | International | Hard (i) | (Sweden) Johanna Larsson | (United States) Raquel Atawo (Germany) Anna-Lena Grönefeld | 4–6, 6–4, [10–5] |
| Loss | 4–6 | Jan 2019 | Hobart International, Australia | International | Hard | (Sweden) Johanna Larsson | (Chinese Taipei) Chan Hao-ching (Chinese Taipei) Latisha Chan | 3–6, 6–3, [6–10] |
| Win | 5–6 | Jun 2019 | Mallorca Open, Spain | International | Grass | (Sweden) Johanna Larsson | (Spain) María José Martínez Sánchez (Spain) Sara Sorribes Tormo | 6–2, 6–4 |
| Loss | 5–7 | Jun 2019 | Eastbourne International, UK | Premier (Note: The WTA Premier tournaments were reclassified as WTA 500 tournaments in 2021.) | Grass | (United States) Bethanie Mattek-Sands | (Chinese Taipei) Chan Hao-ching (Chinese Taipei) Latisha Chan | 6–2, 3–6, [6–10] |
| Loss | 5–8 | Oct 2019 | Kremlin Cup, Russia | Premier | Hard (i) | (United States) Bethanie Mattek-Sands | (Japan) Shuko Aoyama (Japan) Ena Shibahara | 2–6, 1–6 |
| Win | 6–8 | Oct 2022 | Transylvania Open, Romania | WTA 250 | Hard (i) | (Germany) Laura Siegemund | Kamilla Rakhimova; Yana Sizikova | 6–3, 7–5 |
| Win | 7–8 | Jan 2023 | Hobart International, Australia | WTA 250 | Hard | (Germany) Laura Siegemund | (Switzerland) Viktorija Golubic (Hungary) Panna Udvardy | 6–4, 7–5 |

== WTA Challenger finals ==
=== Singles: 1 (title) ===
| Result | W–L | Date | Tournament | Surface | Opponent | Score |
|---|---|---|---|---|---|---|
| Win | 1–0 | Nov 2019 | Houston Challenger, United States | Hard | (United States) CoCo Vandeweghe | 7–6^{(7–4)}, 6–4 |

== ITF Circuit finals ==
=== Singles: 25 (13 titles, 12 runner–ups) ===
| Legend $100,000 tournaments (1–1) $75,000 tournaments (1–0) $50/60,000 tournaments (1–5) $25,000 tournaments (6–6) $10,000 tournaments (4–0) | Finals by surface Hard (0–9) Clay (11–3) Grass (1–0) Carpet (1–0) |

| Result | W–L | Date | Tournament | Tier | Surface | Opponent | Score |
|---|---|---|---|---|---|---|---|
| Win | 1–0 | Aug 2002 | ITF Pétange, Luxembourg | 10,000 | Clay | (Germany) Tanja Hirschauer | 4–6, 6–2, 6–1 |
| Win | 2–0 | Aug 2002 | ITF Koksijde, Belgium | 10,000 | Clay | (Netherlands) Michelle Gerards | 6–4, 7–6^{(7–3)} |
| Loss | 2–1 | Nov 2003 | ITF Nottingham, United Kingdom | 25,000 | Hard (i) | (Austria) Sybille Bammer | 4–6, 6–3, 2–6 |
| Win | 3–1 | Apr 2004 | ITF Naples, Italy | 10,000 | Clay | (Luxembourg) Mandy Minella | 5–7, 6–3, 6–1 |
| Win | 4–1 | Jul 2004 | ITF Innsbruck, Austria | 50,000 | Clay | (Czech Republic) Michaela Paštiková | 6–2, 6–3 |
| Win | 5–1 | Aug 2005 | Ladies Open Hechingen, Germany | 25,000 | Clay | (Slovakia) Magdaléna Rybáriková | 6–4, 6–3 |
| Loss | 5–2 | Feb 2006 | ITF Belfort, France | 25,000 | Hard (i) | (Germany) Kristina Barrois | 2–6, 6–3, 6–7^{(6–8)} |
| Win | 6–2 | Mar 2006 | ITF Las Palmas, Spain | 25,000 | Clay | (Russia) Alla Kudryavtseva | 6–1, 6–4 |
| Loss | 6–3 | Jul 2006 | ITF Pétange, Luxembourg | 50,000 | Clay | (Ukraine) Yuliya Beygelzimer | 7–5, 6–7^{(6–8)}, 4–6 |
| Loss | 6–4 | Oct 2006 | GB Pro-Series Glasgow, UK | 25,000 | Hard (i) | (Germany) Angelique Kerber | 4–6, 2–6 |
| Loss | 6–5 | Nov 2007 | ITF Deauville, France | 50,000 | Clay (i) | (France) Aravane Rezaï | 4–6, 3–6 |
| Win | 7–5 | Mar 2008 | ITF Buchen, Germany | 10,000 | Carpet (i) | (Czech Republic) Sandra Záhlavová | 6–1, 3–6, 6–4 |
| Loss | 7–6 | Mar 2008 | ITF Las Palmas, Spain | 25,000 | Hard | (Netherlands) Chayenne Ewijk | 6–4, 6–7^{(4–7)}, 6–7^{(4–7)} |
| Win | 8–6 | Mar 2008 | ITF Tessenderlo, Belgium | 25,000 | Clay (i) | (Belgium) Caroline Maes | 7–5, 6–1 |
| Win | 9–6 | Jun 2008 | Open de Marseille, France | 75,000 | Clay | (France) Stéphanie Foretz | 7–6^{(7–4)}, 6–2 |
| Loss | 9–7 | Mar 2009 | Biberach Open, Germany | 50,000 | Hard (i) | (Croatia) Karolina Šprem | 1–6, 2–6 |
| Win | 10–7 | Jul 2009 | ITF Zwevegem, Belgium | 25,000 | Clay | (Japan) Yurika Sema | 6–3, 6–3 |
| Loss | 10–8 | Apr 2011 | ITF Monzón, Spain | 50,000 | Hard | (Czech Republic) Petra Cetkovská | 7–5, 4–6, 2–6 |
| Loss | 10–9 | Feb 2012 | ITF Rabat, Morocco | 25,000 | Clay | (Bosnia and Herzegovina) Jasmina Tinjić | 6–7^{(4–7)}, 6–2, 5–7 |
| Loss | 10–10 | Feb 2012 | ITF Moscow, Russia | 25,000 | Hard (i) | (Germany) Annika Beck | 1–6, 5–7 |
| Win | 11–10 | Jul 2012 | ITF Middelburg, Netherlands | 25,000 | Clay | (France) Aravane Rezaï | 6–0, 6–1 |
| Win | 12–10 | Aug 2012 | ITF Rebecq, Belgium | 25,000 | Clay | (France) Myrtille Georges | 6–2, 6–1 |
| Loss | 12–11 | Aug 2015 | Vancouver Open, Canada | 100,000 | Hard | (United Kingdom) Johanna Konta | 2–6, 4–6 |
| Win | 13–11 | Jun 2018 | Southsea Trophy, UK | 100,000+H | Grass | (United Kingdom) Katie Boulter | 6–4, 5–7, 6–3 |
| Loss | 13–12 | Nov 2019 | Toronto Challenger, Canada | 60,000 | Hard (i) | (United States) Francesca Di Lorenzo | 6–7^{(3–7)}, 4–6 |

=== Doubles: 2 (2 titles) ===
| Legend $100,000 tournaments (1–0) $10,000 tournaments (1–0) | Finals by surface Clay (1–0) Grass (1–0) |

| Result | W–L | Date | Tournament | Tier | Surface | Partner | Opponents | Score |
|---|---|---|---|---|---|---|---|---|
| Win | 1–0 | Aug 2003 | ITF Koksijde, Belgium | 10,000 | Clay | (Belgium) Elke Clijsters | (Czech Republic) Zuzana Černá (Czech Republic) Vladimíra Uhlířová | 6–2, 6–4 |
| Win | 2–0 | Jun 2018 | Southsea Trophy, United Kingdom | 100,000+H | Grass | (Sweden) Johanna Larsson | (Poland) Alicja Rosolska (United States) Abigail Spears | 6–4, 3–6, [11–9] |

== WTA Tour career earnings ==
As of 29 August 2022

| Year | Grand Slam titles (Note: Includes singles, doubles and mixed doubles titles.) | WTA titles | Total titles | Earnings ($) | Money list rank |
|---|---|---|---|---|---|
| 2009 | 0 | 0 | 0 | 185,953 | 97 |
| 2010 | 0 | 0 | 0 | 202,216 | 91 |
| 2011 | 0 | 0 | 0 | n/a | n/a |
| 2012 | 0 | 1 | 1 | n/a | n/a |
| 2013 | 0 | 0 | 0 | 1,144,247 | 20 |
| 2014 | 0 | 0 | 0 | 553,201 | 48 |
| 2015 | 0 | 0 | 0 | 307,927 | 105 |
| 2016 | 0 | 1 | 1 | 392,045 | 86 |
| 2017 | 0 | 1 | 1 | 515,984 | 69 |
| 2018 | 0 | 2 | 2 | 643,250 | 59 |
| 2019 | 0 | 1 | 1 | 702,391 | 58 |
| 2020 | 0 | 0 | 0 | 325,900 | 71 |
| 2021 | 0 | 0 | 0 | 147,651 | 198 |
| 2022 | 0 | 0 | 0 | 401,437 | 86 |
| Career | 0 | 6 | 6 | 6,036,281 | 107 |

== Head-to-head records ==
=== Record against top 10 players ===
Flipkens's record against players who have been ranked in the top 10. Active players are in boldface.

| Player | Record | Win% | Hard | Clay | Grass | Last match |
|---|---|---|---|---|---|---|
| **Number 1 ranked players** | | | | | | |
| **(Czech Republic) Karolína Plíšková** | 2–2 | 50% | 2–2 | – | – | Lost (2–6, 4–6) at 2014 Linz |
| (Serbia) Ana Ivanovic | 1–1 | 50% | 1–1 | – | – | Lost (0–6, 6–7^{(3–7)}) at 2014 Auckland |
| **(Spain) Garbiñe Muguruza** | 3–4 | 43% | 1–4 | – | 2–0 | Won (6–3, 4–6, 6–4) at 2019 Fed Cup |
| **(United States) Venus Williams** | 2–3 | 40% | 2–3 | – | – | Lost (5–7, 2–6) at 2021 Australian Open |
| (Denmark) Caroline Wozniacki | 1–2 | 33% | 1–1 | – | 0–1 | Lost (3–6, 4–6) at 2019 Eastbourne |
| **(Australia) Ashleigh Barty** | 0–1 | 0% | 0–1 | – | – | Lost (1–6, 0–6) at 2017 Cincinnati |
| (United States) Serena Williams | 0–1 | 0% | 0–1 | – | – | Lost (0–6, 3–6) at 2013 Toronto |
| **(Belgium) Kim Clijsters** | 0–1 | 0% | 0–1 | – | – | Lost (0–6, 2–6) at 2009 US Open |
| (Belgium) Justine Henin | 0–1 | 0% | 0–1 | – | – | Lost (4–6, 3–6) at 2010 Australian Open |
| **(Russia)** Dinara Safina | 0–1 | 0% | – | – | 0–1 | Lost (5–7, 1–6) at 2009 Wimbledon |
| (Serbia) Jelena Janković | 0–3 | 0% | 0–3 | – | – | Lost (5–7, 5–7) at 2012 Fed Cup |
| **(Belarus) Victoria Azarenka** | 0–4 | 0% | 0–3 | – | 0–1 | Lost (3–6, 3–6) at 2015 Wimbledon |
| (Germany) **Angelique Kerber** | 0–4 | 0% | 0–2 | – | 0–2 | Lost (2–6, 4–6) at 2019 Monterrey |
| (Russia) Maria Sharapova | 0–5 | 0% | 0–4 | 0–1 | – | Lost (6–3, 4–6, 1–6) at 2014 Miami |
| **(Romania) Simona Halep** | 0–6 | 0% | 0–3 | 0–1 | 0–2 | Lost (5–7, 4–6) at 2022 Wimbledon |
| Number 2 ranked players | | | | | | |
| **(Czech Republic) Barbora Krejčíková** | 1–0 | 100% | 1–0 | – | – | Won (6–3, 6–1) at 2017 New Haven |
| **(Belarus) Aryna Sabalenka** | 1–0 | 100% | – | – | 1–0 | Won (6–4, 6–4) at 2018 's-Hertogenbosch |
| **(Czech Republic) Petra Kvitová** | 3–1 | 75% | 2–1 | – | 1–0 | Won (4–6, 6–3, 6–4) at 2013 Wimbledon |
| **(Russia) Svetlana Kuznetsova** | 0–1 | 0% | 0–1 | – | – | Lost (4–6, 5–7) at 2014 Washington |
| **(Russia) Vera Zvonareva** | 0–2 | 0% | 0–2 | – | – | Lost (0–6, 0–6) at 2010 Dubai |
| (Poland) Agnieszka Radwańska | 0–3 | 0% | 0–3 | – | – | Lost (1–6, 4–6) at 2016 New Haven |
| (China) Li Na | 0–1 | 0% | – | 0–1 | – | Lost (1–6, 6–7^{(7–9)}) at 2014 Madrid |
| Number 3 ranked players | | | | | | |
| **(Greece) Maria Sakkari** | 1–0 | 100% | 1–0 | – | – | Won (7–6, 3–6, 7–6) at 2016 Tashkent |
| **(Ukraine) Elina Svitolina** | 0–1 | 0% | – | – | 0–1 | Lost (6–7^{(4–7)}, 4–6) at 2014 's-Hertogenbosch |
| (Russia) Elena Dementieva | 0–1 | 0% | 0–1 | – | – | Lost (4–6, 2–6) at 2010 Indian Wells |
| (Russia) Nadia Petrova | 0–2 | 0% | 0–1 | – | 0–1 | Lost (4–6, 2–6) at 2012 's-Hertogenbosch |
| Number 4 ranked players | | | | | | |
| (Netherlands) Kiki Bertens | 4–2 | 67% | 2–2 | 1–0 | 1–0 | Lost (1–6, 1–6) at 2018 Beijing |
| (Australia) Jelena Dokic | 1–1 | 50% | 1–1 | – | – | Lost (4–6, 0–6) at 2009 ITF Athens |
| **(France) Caroline Garcia** | 1–3 | 25% | 1–1 | 0–1 | 0–1 | Lost (7–5, 4–6, 0–6) at 2021 Indian Wells |
| (Slovakia) Dominika Cibulková | 2–6 | 25% | 1–5 | 0–1 | 1–0 | Lost (4–6, 2–6) at 2018 Budapest |
| (Australia) Samantha Stosur | 1–3 | 25% | 0–2 | 0–1 | 1–0 | Lost (2–6, 6–7^{(6–8)}) at 2017 French Open |
| **(Switzerland) Belinda Bencic** | 1–3 | 25% | 1–3 | – | – | Lost (6–7^{(8–10)}, 1–6) at 2019 Moscow |
| (United Kingdom) Johanna Konta | 1–5 | 17% | 1–5 | – | – | Lost (2–6, 0–6) at 2020 Cincinnati |
| **(Canada) Bianca Andreescu** | 0–1 | 0% | 0–1 | – | – | Lost (3–6, 5–7) at 2019 US Open |
| (Japan) Kimiko Date | 0–1 | 0% | – | 0–1 | – | Lost (0–6, 4–6) at 2009 ITF Saint Gaudens |
| **(United States) Sofia Kenin** | 0–3 | 0% | 0–2 | – | 0–1 | Lost (7–5, 4–5 ret.) at 2021 Abu Dhabi |
| Number 5 ranked players | | | | | | |
| (Italy) Francesca Schiavone | 5–2 | 71% | 4–1 | 0–1 | 1–0 | Won (6–3, 7–6^{(7–5)}) at 2016 Monterrey |
| **(Latvia) Jeļena Ostapenko** | 2–2 | 50% | 2–1 | – | 0–1 | Lost (2–6, 7–5, 3–6) at 2021 Miami |
| (Czech Republic) Lucie Šafářová | 2–2 | 50% | 1–1 | 1–1 | – | Won (6–2, 0–0 ret.) at 2016 Olympics |
| **(Canada) Eugenie Bouchard** | 1–1 | 50% | 1–1 | – | – | Lost (5–7, 5–7) at 2020 Auckland |
| (Slovakia) Daniela Hantuchová | 1–1 | 50% | 1–1 | – | – | Won (4–6, 6–3, 6–1) at 2016 New Haven |
| **(Italy) Sara Errani** | 0–5 | 0% | 0–3 | 0–2 | – | Lost (7–5, 1–6, 0–6) at 2018 Madrid |
| Number 6 ranked players | | | | | | |
| (Italy) Flavia Pennetta | 2–1 | 67% | – | 1–1 | 1–0 | Won (7–6^{(7–2)}, 6–3) at 2013 Wimbledon |
| (Spain) Carla Suárez Navarro | 1–3 | 25% | 1–3 | – | – | Lost (2–6, 4–6) at 2014 Beijing |
| Number 7 ranked players | | | | | | |
| (Italy) Roberta Vinci | 2–2 | 50% | 0–1 | 1–0 | 1–1 | Lost (4–6, 7–5, 2–6) at 2017 Mallorca |
| **(United States) Madison Keys** | 1–2 | 33% | 0–1 | 1–0 | 0–1 | Lost (4–6, 6–4, 3–6) at 2016 Wimbledon |
| **(United States) Jessica Pegula** | 0–1 | 0% | 0–1 | – | – | Lost (6–7, 7–6, 3–6) at 2020 US Open |
| **(United States) Danielle Collins** | 0–2 | 0% | 0–2 | – | – | Lost (4–6, 2–6) at 2021 Chicago |
| **(Switzerland)** Patty Schnyder | 0–2 | 0% | 0–2 | – | – | Lost (1–6, 3–6) at 2010 US Open |
| Number 8 ranked players | | | | | | |
| (Russia) Ekaterina Makarova | 0–1 | 0% | 0–1 | – | – | Lost (2–6, 4–6) at 2018 Indian Wells |
| Number 9 ranked players | | | | | | |
| **(Switzerland) Timea Bacsinszky** | 2–1 | 67% | 2–1 | – | – | Won (7–6^{(7–4)}, 6–7^{(5–7)}, 6–1) at 2010 Indian Wells |
| **(United States) CoCo Vandeweghe** | 2–2 | 50% | 2–2 | – | – | Won (7–6^{(7–4)}, 6–4) at 2019 125K Houston |
| **(Germany) Andrea Petkovic** | 2–4 | 33% | 2–3 | – | 0–1 | Lost (7–6^{(7–5)}, 3–6, 2–6) at 2015 Doha |
| (Germany) Julia Görges | 1–3 | 25% | 1–1 | – | 0–2 | Lost (2–6, 1–2 ret.) at 2013 Stuttgart |
| **(Russia) Daria Kasatkina** | 0–2 | 0% | 0–1 | 0–1 | – | Lost (3–6, 3–6) at 2018 French Open |
| Number 10 ranked players | | | | | | |
| (Russia) Maria Kirilenko | 1–0 | 100% | – | – | 1–0 | Won (6–3, 3–3 ret.) at 2010 's-Hertogenbosch |
| **(France) Kristina Mladenovic** | 1–2 | 33% | 0–2 | – | 1–0 | Won (6–4, 6–4) at 2022 Eastbourne |
| **Total** | **52–120** | **30%** | **35–90 (28%)** | **5–13 (28%)** | **12–17 (41%)** | |

=== Top 10 wins ===
| # | Player | Rank | Event | Surface | Rd | Score |
|---|---|---|---|---|---|---|
**2012**
| 1. | (Australia) Samantha Stosur | No. 5 | Rosmalen Open, Netherlands | Grass | 1R | 7–6^{(9–7)}, 6–3 |
**2013**
| 2. | (Czech Republic) Petra Kvitová | No. 8 | Miami Open, United States | Hard | 3R | 6–0, 4–6, 6–1 |
| 3. | (Czech Republic) Petra Kvitová | No. 8 | Wimbledon, United Kingdom | Grass | QF | 4–6, 6–3, 6–4 |
**2016**
| 4. | (Spain) Garbiñe Muguruza | No. 2 | Mallorca Open, Spain | Grass | 1R | 6–3, 6–4 |
| 5. | (United States) Venus Williams | No. 6 | Rio Summer Olympics | Hard | 1R | 4–6, 6–3, 7–6^{(7–5)} |
