= 2018 Fuzion 100 Southsea Trophy =

- Date: 25 June–1 July
- Edition: 2nd
- Category: ITF Women's Circuit
- Prize money: $100,000+H
- Surface: Grass
- Location: Southsea, United Kingdom

Champions

Singles
- (Belgium) Kirsten Flipkens

Doubles
- (Belgium) Kirsten Flipkens / (Sweden) Johanna Larsson
← 2017 ·	Southsea Trophy	· 2019 →

The 2018 Fuzion 100 Southsea Trophy was a professional tennis tournament played on outdoor grass courts. It was the second edition of the tournament and was part of the 2018 ITF Women's Circuit. It took place in Southsea, United Kingdom, on 25 June–1 July 2018.

== Singles main draw entrants ==
=== Seeds ===
Country	Player	Rank^{1}	Seed
CRO	Petra Martić	45	1
BEL	Kirsten Flipkens	48	2
ROU	Monica Niculescu	59	3
SWE	Johanna Larsson	63	4

- ^{1} Rankings as of 18 June 2018.

=== Other entrants ===
The following players received a wildcard into the singles main draw:

- (United Kingdom) Katie Boulter
- (United Kingdom) Gabriella Taylor

The following player received entry as an alternate:

- (Czech Republic) Renata Voráčová

== Champions ==
=== Singles ===
- (Belgium) Kirsten Flipkens def. (United Kingdom) Katie Boulter, 6–4, 5–7, 6–3

=== Doubles ===
- (Belgium) Kirsten Flipkens / (Sweden) Johanna Larsson def. (Poland) Alicja Rosolska / (United States) Abigail Spears, 6–4, 3–6, [11–9]
