= 2017 Aegon Southsea Trophy =

- Date: 26 June–2 July
- Edition: 1st
- Category: ITF Women's Circuit
- Prize money: $100,000+H
- Surface: Grass
- Location: Southsea, United Kingdom

Champions

Singles
- (Germany) Tatjana Maria

Doubles
- (Japan) Shuko Aoyama / (China) Yang Zhaoxuan
| Aegon Southsea Trophy | · 2018 → |

The 2017 Aegon Southsea Trophy was a professional tennis tournament played on outdoor grass courts. It was the first edition of the tournament and was part of the 2017 ITF Women's Circuit. It took place in Southsea, United Kingdom, on 26 June–2 July 2017.

== Singles main draw entrants ==
=== Seeds ===
| Country | Player | Rank^{1} | Seed |
|---|---|---|---|
| ROU | Irina-Camelia Begu | 68 | 1 |
| SUI | Viktorija Golubic | 71 | 2 |
| POL | Magda Linette | 75 | 3 |
| RUS | Ekaterina Alexandrova | 76 | 4 |

- ^{1} Rankings as of 19 June 2017.

=== Other entrants ===
The following players received a wildcard into the singles main draw:

- (United Kingdom) Katie Boulter
- (United Kingdom) Laura Robson

== Champions ==
=== Singles ===
- (Germany) Tatjana Maria def. (Romania) Irina-Camelia Begu, 6–2, 6–2

=== Doubles ===
- (Japan) Shuko Aoyama / (China) Yang Zhaoxuan def. (Switzerland) Viktorija Golubic / (Ukraine) Lyudmyla Kichenok, 6–7^{(7–9)}, 6–3, [10–8]
