= 2017 Aegon Southsea Trophy – Singles =

Singles
- 2017 Aegon Southsea Trophy

Final
- Champion: (Germany) Tatjana Maria
- Runner-up: (Romania) Irina-Camelia Begu
- Score: 6–2, 6–2

Events
Singles	Doubles
Aegon Southsea Trophy	· 2018 →

It was the first edition of the tournament.

Tatjana Maria won the title, defeating Irina-Camelia Begu in the final, 6–2, 6–2.

== Seeds ==
1. (Romania) Irina-Camelia Begu (final)
2. (Switzerland) Viktorija Golubic (first round)
3. (Poland) Magda Linette (first round)
4. (Russia) Ekaterina Alexandrova (semifinals)

== Draw ==
=== Key ===
- Q = Qualifier
- WC = Wild card
- LL = Lucky loser
- Alt = Alternate
- ITF = ITF entry
- PR = Protected ranking
- SR = Special ranking
- SE = Special exempt
- JE = Junior exempt
- JR = Junior Accelerator Programme entrant
- CO = College Accelerator Programme entrant
- NG = Next Gen Accelerator Program entrant
- w/o = Walkover
- r = Retired
- d = Defaulted

=== Draw ===
First round
1	(Romania) I-C Begu	6	4	6
(China) X Han	2	6	2
WC	(United Kingdom) K Boulter	2	2
(Germany) A Petkovic	6	6
4	(Russia) E Alexandrova	6	2	6
WC	(United Kingdom) L Robson	4	6	4
(United States) J Boserup	6	6
(Spain) S Sorribes Tormo	2	3
(France) P Parmentier	2	0
(Russia) E Rodina	6	6
(Japan) K Nara	4	7	6
3	(Poland) M Linette	6	5	2
(Japan) N Hibino	2	0
(Germany) T Maria	6	6
(United States) J Brady	7^{7}	2	6
2	(Switzerland) V Golubic	6^{3}	6	4

Quarterfinals
1	(Romania) I-C Begu	7^{11}	6
(Germany) A Petkovic	6^{9}	4
4	(Russia) E Alexandrova	6	7
(United States) J Boserup	3	5
(Russia) E Rodina	6	6
(Japan) K Nara	4	4
(Germany) T Maria	7^{7}	6
(United States) J Brady	6^{4}	3

Semifinals
1	(Romania) I-C Begu	6	3	6
4	(Russia) E Alexandrova	1	6	1
(Russia) E Rodina	2	3
(Germany) T Maria	6	6

Final
1	(Romania) I-C Begu	2	2
(Germany) T Maria	6	6
