= 2019 Libéma Open – Women's singles =

Women's singles
- 2019 Libéma Open

Final
- Champion: (United States) Alison Riske
- Runner-up: (Netherlands) Kiki Bertens
- Score: 0–6, 7–6^{(7–3)}, 7–5

Details
- Draw: 32 (6 Q / 3 WC )
- Seeds: 8

Events
Singles	men	women
Doubles	men	women
← 2018 ·	Libéma Open	· 2022 →

Alison Riske defeated Kiki Bertens in the final, 0–6, 7–6^{(7–3)}, 7–5, to win the women's singles title at the 2019 Rosmalen Grass Court Championships. Riske saved five championship points en route to winning her second career WTA Tour singles title, her first in five years.

Aleksandra Krunić was the defending champion, but she lost to Kirsten Flipkens in the first round in a rematch of the previous year's final.

== Seeds ==
1. (Netherlands) Kiki Bertens (final)
2. (Belarus) Aryna Sabalenka (first round)
3. (Belgium) Elise Mertens (first round)
4. (Ukraine) Lesia Tsurenko (second round)
5. (Croatia) Petra Martić (withdrew)
6. (China) Zheng Saisai (withdrew)
7. (Slovakia) Viktória Kužmová (first round)
8. (United States) Amanda Anisimova (withdrew)
9. (Belgium) Alison Van Uytvanck (second round)

== Draw ==
=== Key ===
- Q = Qualifier
- WC = Wild card
- LL = Lucky loser
- Alt = Alternate
- SE = Special exempt
- PR = Protected ranking
- ITF = ITF entry
- JE = Junior exempt
- w/o = Walkover
- r = Retired
- d = Defaulted
- SR = Special ranking

=== Finals ===
Semifinals
1	(Netherlands) Kiki Bertens	6	6
Q	(Kazakhstan) Elena Rybakina	4	4
(United States) Alison Riske	6	3	7^{7}
(Russia) Veronika Kudermetova	4	6	6^{5}

Final
1	(Netherlands) Kiki Bertens	6	6^{3}	5
(United States) Alison Riske	0	7^{7}	7

=== Top half ===
First round
1	(Netherlands) K Bertens	6	6
(Sweden) J Larsson	3	1
WC	(Netherlands) A Rus	7	6
WC	(Netherlands) B Schoofs	5	4
Q	(Spain) P Badosa	6	6
Q	(Australia) P Hon	4	3
(Russia) N Vikhlyantseva	6	6
LL	(Russia) A Kalinskaya	2	3
4	(Ukraine) L Tsurenko	6	6
(Czech Republic) Kr Plíšková	4	4
(Belgium) K Flipkens	6	3	6
(Serbia) A Krunić	3	6	1
Q	(United States) V Lepchenko	1	2
Q	(Kazakhstan) E Rybakina	6	6
(China) Y Wang	6^{4}	3
9	(Belgium) A Van Uytvanck	7^{7}	6

Second round
1	(Netherlands) K Bertens	7	6
WC	(Netherlands) A Rus	5	3
Q	(Spain) P Badosa	1	1
(Russia) N Vikhlyantseva	6	6
4	(Ukraine) L Tsurenko	6^{8}	5
(Belgium) K Flipkens	7^{10}	7
Q	(Kazakhstan) E Rybakina	6	6
9	(Belgium) A Van Uytvanck	3	4

Quarterfinals
1	(Netherlands) K Bertens	6	6
(Russia) N Vikhlyantseva	3	3
(Belgium) K Flipkens	4	4
Q	(Kazakhstan) E Rybakina	6	6

Semifinals
1	(Netherlands) K Bertens	6	6
Q	(Kazakhstan) E Rybakina	4	4

=== Bottom half ===
First round
LL	(United States) C McHale	4	4
(Slovenia) P Hercog	6	6
(United States) A Riske	6^{4}	6	6
(Czech Republic) K Muchová	7^{7}	3	2
Q	(Belgium) Y Bonaventure	6	2	6
LL	(France) F Ferro	2	6	0
(Russia) E Alexandrova	6	6
3	(Belgium) E Mertens	4	2
7	(Slovakia) V Kužmová	6	6^{5}	4
(Russia) M Gasparyan	2	7^{7}	6
(Germany) M Barthel	5	4
Q	(Belgium) G Minnen	7	6
(Russia) V Kudermetova	6	6
(Tunisia) O Jabeur	3	4
WC	(Australia) D Aiava	7^{7}	1	6
2	(Belarus) A Sabalenka	6^{3}	6	4

Second round
(Slovenia) P Hercog	4	6^{5}
(United States) A Riske	6	7^{7}
Q	(Belgium) Y Bonaventure	3	4
(Russia) E Alexandrova	6	6
(Russia) M Gasparyan	4	4
Q	(Belgium) G Minnen	6	6
(Russia) V Kudermetova	6	6
WC	(Australia) D Aiava	3	1

Quarterfinals
(United States) A Riske	7	6
(Russia) E Alexandrova	5	3
Q	(Belgium) G Minnen	6	5	3
(Russia) V Kudermetova	4	7	6

Semifinals
(United States) A Riske	6	3	7^{7}
(Russia) V Kudermetova	4	6	6^{5}

== Qualifying ==
=== Seeds ===
1. (France) Fiona Ferro (qualifying competition, lucky loser)
2. (United States) Christina McHale (qualifying competition, lucky loser)
3. (Belgium) Ysaline Bonaventure (qualified)
4. (Spain) Paula Badosa (qualified)
5. (United States) Varvara Lepchenko (qualified)
6. (Australia) Priscilla Hon (qualified)
7. (Kazakhstan) Elena Rybakina (qualified)
8. (Germany) Tamara Korpatsch (first round)
9. (Russia) Anna Kalinskaya (qualifying competition, lucky loser)
10. (Germany) Antonia Lottner (qualifying competition)
11. (Belgium) Greet Minnen (qualified)
12. (Spain) Georgina García Pérez (first round, retired)

=== Qualifiers ===
1. (Belgium) Greet Minnen
2. (Kazakhstan) Elena Rybakina
3. (Belgium) Ysaline Bonaventure
4. (Spain) Paula Badosa
5. (United States) Varvara Lepchenko
6. (Australia) Priscilla Hon

=== Lucky losers ===
1. (France) Fiona Ferro
2. (United States) Christina McHale
3. (Russia) Anna Kalinskaya

=== Draw ===
==== First qualifier ====
First round
1	(France) Fiona Ferro	7	6
WC	(Netherlands) Noa Liauw a Fong	5	4
(Germany) Sabine Lisicki	7^{7}	1	4
11	(Belgium) Greet Minnen	6^{5}	6	6

Qualifying competition
1	(France) Fiona Ferro	4	3
11	(Belgium) Greet Minnen	6	6

==== Second qualifier ====
First round
2	(United States) Christina McHale	6	6
WC	(Netherlands) Rosalie van der Hoek	3	3
(Czech Republic) Barbora Štefková	6^{5}	0
7	(Kazakhstan) Elena Rybakina	7^{7}	6

Qualifying competition
2	(United States) Christina McHale	2	6^{5}
7	(Kazakhstan) Elena Rybakina	6	7^{7}

==== Third qualifier ====
First round
3	(Belgium) Ysaline Bonaventure	6	1	7^{7}
WC	(Netherlands) Arianne Hartono	3	6	6^{3}
(Netherlands) Lesley Kerkhove	1	2
10	(Germany) Antonia Lottner	6	6

Qualifying competition
3	(Belgium) Ysaline Bonaventure	7^{7}	4	6
10	(Germany) Antonia Lottner	6^{5}	6	4

==== Fourth qualifier ====
First round
4	(Spain) Paula Badosa	3	6	6
(Poland) Katarzyna Kawa	6	3	4
(Hungary) Fanny Stollár	6	4	6
8	(Germany) Tamara Korpatsch	4	6	3

Qualifying competition
4	(Spain) Paula Badosa	6	6
(Hungary) Fanny Stollár	4	2

==== Fifth qualifier ====
First round
5	(United States) Varvara Lepchenko	6	6
WC	(Netherlands) Indy de Vroome	1	4
(Slovakia) Michaela Hončová	3	6	0
9	(Russia) Anna Kalinskaya	6	3	6

Qualifying competition
5	(United States) Varvara Lepchenko	6	7^{7}
9	(Russia) Anna Kalinskaya	2	6^{5}

==== Sixth qualifier ====
First round
6	(Australia) Priscilla Hon	7^{7}	6
(Hungary) Dalma Gálfi	6^{5}	4
(Russia) Marina Melnikova	7^{9}	4
12	(Spain) Georgina García Pérez	6^{7}	1^{r}

Qualifying competition
6	(Australia) Priscilla Hon	6	6
(Russia) Marina Melnikova	3	3
