= 2018 Libéma Open =

- Date: 11–17 June
- Edition: 29th
- Category: ATP World Tour 250; WTA International
- Draw: 32S / 16D
- Prize money: €612,755 (ATP) €250,000 (WTA)
- Surface: Grass
- Location: Rosmalen, 's-Hertogenbosch, Netherlands

Champions

Men's singles
- (France) Richard Gasquet

Women's singles
- (Serbia) Aleksandra Krunić

Men's doubles
- (United Kingdom) Dominic Inglot / (Croatia) Franko Škugor

Women's doubles
- (Belgium) Elise Mertens / (Netherlands) Demi Schuurs
← 2017 ·	Libéma Open	· 2019 →

The 2018 Libéma Open was a tennis tournament played on outdoor grass courts. It was the 29th edition of the event, and part of the 250 Series of the 2018 ATP World Tour, and of the WTA International tournaments of the 2018 WTA Tour. Both the men's and the women's events took place at the Autotron park in Rosmalen, 's-Hertogenbosch, Netherlands, from June 11 through June 17, 2018.

== ATP singles main-draw entrants ==
=== Seeds ===
Country	Player	Rank^{1}	Seed
FRA	Adrian Mannarino	26	1
FRA	Richard Gasquet	32	2
LUX	Gilles Müller	34	3
ESP	Fernando Verdasco	35	4
GRE	Stefanos Tsitsipas	39	5
NED	Robin Haase	44	6
JPN	Yūichi Sugita	48	7
ITA	Andreas Seppi	50	8

- ^{1} Rankings are as of May 28, 2018.

=== Other entrants ===
The following players received wildcards into the main draw:

- (Netherlands) ~~Tallon Griekspoor~~
- (United States) Mackenzie McDonald
- (Greece) Stefanos Tsitsipas

The following players received entry from the qualifying draw:

- (Australia) Alex Bolt
- (Australia) Max Purcell
- (Croatia) Franko Škugor
- (Australia) Bernard Tomic

The following players received entry as lucky losers:

- (United States) Kevin King
- (Australia) John-Patrick Smith
- (United States) Tim Smyczek

=== Withdrawals ===
Before the tournament

- (Ukraine) Alexandr Dolgopolov → replaced by (United States) Kevin King
- (Netherlands) Tallon Griekspoor → replaced by (Australia) John-Patrick Smith
- (United States) Ryan Harrison → replaced by (Tunisia) Malek Jaziri
- (France) Pierre-Hugues Herbert → replaced by (United States) Tim Smyczek
- (Serbia) Filip Krajinović → replaced by (Romania) Marius Copil
- (Russia) Karen Khachanov → replaced by (Russia) Evgeny Donskoy
- (Chinese Taipei) Lu Yen-hsun → replaced by (India) Yuki Bhambri
- (United Kingdom) Andy Murray → replaced by (Canada) Vasek Pospisil
- (United States) Tennys Sandgren → replaced by (France) Jérémy Chardy

== ATP doubles main-draw entrants ==
=== Seeds ===
Country	Player	Country	Player	Rank^{1}	Seed
POL	Łukasz Kubot	BRA	Marcelo Melo	7	1
RSA	Raven Klaasen	NZL	Michael Venus	46	2
GBR	Dominic Inglot	CRO	Franko Škugor	82	3
IND	Divij Sharan	NZL	Artem Sitak	89	4

- ^{1} Rankings are as of May 28, 2018

=== Other entrants ===
The following pair received wildcards into the doubles main draw:

- (Australia) Alex Bolt / (Australia) Lleyton Hewitt

The following pair received entry as alternates:

- (Romania) Marius Copil / (Greece) Stefanos Tsitsipas

=== Withdrawals ===
Before the tournament

- (Netherlands) Tallon Griekspoor

== WTA singles main-draw entrants ==
=== Seeds ===
Country	Player	Rank^{1}	Seed
USA	CoCo Vandeweghe	15	1
BEL	Elise Mertens	16	2
NED	Kiki Bertens	22	3
EST	Anett Kontaveit	24	4
CHN	Zhang Shuai	27	5
BEL	Alison Van Uytvanck	46	6
SRB	Aleksandra Krunić	47	7
BLR	Aryna Sabalenka	48	8

- ^{1} Rankings are as of May 28, 2018.

=== Other entrants ===
The following players received wildcards into the main draw:

- (Netherlands) Richèl Hogenkamp
- (Russia) Anna Kalinskaya
- (Netherlands) Bibiane Schoofs

The following players received entry from the qualifying draw:

- (Russia) Anna Blinkova
- (Greece) Valentini Grammatikopoulou
- (Russia) Veronika Kudermetova
- (Germany) Antonia Lottner
- (Russia) Marina Melnikova
- (Hungary) Fanny Stollár

The following player received entry as a lucky loser:

- (Czech Republic) Tereza Martincová

=== Withdrawals ===
Before the tournament

- (Poland) Magda Linette → replaced by (Czech Republic) Tereza Martincová
- (Germany) Sabine Lisicki → replaced by (Slovakia) Viktória Kužmová
- (Ukraine) Lesia Tsurenko → replaced by (Russia) Ekaterina Alexandrova

== WTA doubles main-draw entrants ==
=== Seeds ===
Country	Player	Country	Player	Rank^{1}	Seed
BEL	Elise Mertens	NED	Demi Schuurs	51	1
NED	Kiki Bertens	BEL	Kirsten Flipkens	56	2
NED	Lesley Kerkhove	BLR	Lidziya Marozava	114	3
SUI	Xenia Knoll	GBR	Anna Smith	115	4

- ^{1} Rankings are as of May 28, 2018.

=== Other entrants ===
The following pairs received wildcards into the doubles main draw:

- (Netherlands) Richèl Hogenkamp / (Netherlands) Bibiane Schoofs
- (Netherlands) Arantxa Rus / (Netherlands) Eva Wacanno

=== Retirements ===
- (Belgium) Kirsten Flipkens

== Champions ==
=== Men's singles ===
- (France) Richard Gasquet def. (France) Jérémy Chardy, 6–3, 7–6^{(7–5)}

=== Women's singles ===
- (Serbia) Aleksandra Krunić def. (Belgium) Kirsten Flipkens, 6–7^{(0–7)}, 7–5, 6–1

=== Men's doubles ===
- (United Kingdom) Dominic Inglot / (Croatia) Franko Škugor def. (South Africa) Raven Klaasen / (New Zealand) Michael Venus, 7–6^{(7–3)}, 7–5

=== Women's doubles ===
- (Belgium) Elise Mertens / (Netherlands) Demi Schuurs def. (Netherlands) Kiki Bertens / (Belgium) Kirsten Flipkens, 3–3, retired.
