= 2018 Libéma Open – Men's doubles =

Men's doubles
- 2018 Libéma Open

Final
- Champions: (United Kingdom) Dominic Inglot (Croatia) Franko Škugor
- Runners-up: (South Africa) Raven Klaasen (New Zealand) Michael Venus
- Score: 7–6^{(7–3)}, 7–5

Events
Singles	men	women
Doubles	men	women
← 2017 ·	Libéma Open	· 2019 →

Łukasz Kubot and Marcelo Melo were the defending champions, but lost in the semifinals to Dominic Inglot and Franko Škugor.

Inglot and Škugor went on to win the title, defeating Raven Klaasen and Michael Venus in the final, 7–6^{(7–3)}, 7–5.

== Seeds ==
1. (Poland) Łukasz Kubot / (Brazil) Marcelo Melo (semifinals)
2. (South Africa) Raven Klaasen / (New Zealand) Michael Venus (final)
3. (United Kingdom) Dominic Inglot / (Croatia) Franko Škugor (champions)
4. (India) Divij Sharan / (New Zealand) Artem Sitak (semifinals)

== Draw ==
=== Key ===
- Q = Qualifier
- WC = Wild card
- LL = Lucky loser
- Alt = Alternate
- SE = Special exempt
- PR = Protected ranking
- ITF = ITF entry
- JE = Junior exempt
- w/o = Walkover
- r = Retired
- d = Defaulted
- SR = Special ranking

=== Draw ===
First round
1	(Poland) Ł Kubot (Brazil) M Melo	6	6
(Japan) Y Sugita (United States) D Young	4	2
(Netherlands) S Arends (Netherlands) M Middelkoop	6	6
(Italy) A Seppi (Belarus) A Vasilevski	3	4
3	(United Kingdom) D Inglot (Croatia) F Škugor	6	7^{7}
(Netherlands) R Haase (Netherlands) W Koolhof	4	6^{4}
Alt	(Romania) M Copil (Greece) S Tsitsipas	5	5
(France) F Martin (India) P Raja	7	7
(Monaco) R Arneodo (Luxembourg) G Müller	7^{7}	3	[11]
(United States) N Monroe (Australia) J-P Smith	6^{4}	6	[9]
(Spain) D Marrero (Spain) F Verdasco	3	3
4	(India) D Sharan (New Zealand) A Sitak	6	6
(Australia) M Ebden (Tunisia) M Jaziri	5	6	[10]
(United States) J Cerretani (Croatia) A Šančić	7	3	[4]
WC	(Australia) A Bolt (Australia) L Hewitt	5	5
2	(South Africa) R Klaasen (New Zealand) M Venus	7	7

Quarterfinals
1	(Poland) Ł Kubot (Brazil) M Melo	4	6	[10]
(Netherlands) S Arends (Netherlands) M Middelkoop	6	4	[8]
3	(United Kingdom) D Inglot (Croatia) F Škugor	7^{8}	7
(France) F Martin (India) P Raja	6^{6}	5
(Monaco) R Arneodo (Luxembourg) G Müller	6^{2}	3
4	(India) D Sharan (New Zealand) A Sitak	7^{7}	6
(Australia) M Ebden (Tunisia) M Jaziri	6	4	[4]
2	(South Africa) R Klaasen (New Zealand) M Venus	2	6	[10]

Semifinals
1	(Poland) Ł Kubot (Brazil) M Melo	4	7^{7}	[6]
3	(United Kingdom) D Inglot (Croatia) F Škugor	6	6^{3}	[10]
4	(India) D Sharan (New Zealand) A Sitak	3	2
2	(South Africa) R Klaasen (New Zealand) M Venus	6	6

Final
3	(United Kingdom) D Inglot (Croatia) F Škugor	7^{7}	7
2	(South Africa) R Klaasen (New Zealand) M Venus	6^{3}	5
