= 2019 Libéma Open – Men's doubles =

Men's doubles
- 2019 Libéma Open

Final
- Champions: (United Kingdom) Dominic Inglot (United States) Austin Krajicek
- Runners-up: (New Zealand) Marcus Daniell (Netherlands) Wesley Koolhof
- Score: 6–4, 4–6, [10–4]

Events
Singles	men	women
Doubles	men	women
← 2018 ·	Libéma Open	· 2022 →

Defending champion Dominic Inglot and his partner, Austin Krajicek, defeated Marcus Daniell and Wesley Koolhof in the final, 6–4, 4–6, [10–4], to win the men's doubles tennis title at the 2019 Rosmalen Grass Court Championships. It was the first time Inglot and Krajicek had competed as a team, and the victory earned Inglot his 12th career ATP Tour doubles title and Krajicek his second. Daniell and Koolhof were contesting to win their second title of the season together.

Inglot had won the tournament in 2018 with Franko Škugor, but Škugor did not return to defend his title and competed in Stuttgart instead.

== Seeds ==
1. (Poland) Łukasz Kubot / (Brazil) Marcelo Melo (quarterfinals)
2. (South Africa) Raven Klaasen / (New Zealand) Michael Venus (quarterfinals)
3. (United Kingdom) Jamie Murray / (United Kingdom) Neal Skupski (quarterfinals)
4. (United States) Rajeev Ram / (United Kingdom) Joe Salisbury (quarterfinals)

== Draw ==
=== Key ===
- Q = Qualifier
- WC = Wild card
- LL = Lucky loser
- Alt = Alternate
- SE = Special exempt
- PR = Protected ranking
- ITF = ITF entry
- JE = Junior exempt
- w/o = Walkover
- r = Retired
- d = Defaulted
- SR = Special ranking

=== Draw ===
First round
1	(Poland) Ł Kubot (Brazil) M Melo	7	6
(Monaco) R Arneodo (France) P-H Herbert	5	2
WC	(Netherlands) T de Bakker (Netherlands) D Pel	5	2
(United Kingdom) D Inglot (United States) A Krajicek	7	6
4	(United States) R Ram (United Kingdom) J Salisbury	5	7^{7}	[10]
(Netherlands) S Arends (Netherlands) M Middelkoop	7	6^{4}	[5]
WC	(Australia) L Hewitt (Australia) J Thompson	6	6^{4}	[8]
(Australia) A de Minaur (Spain) D Vega Hernández	4	7^{7}	[10]
(El Salvador) M Arévalo (Mexico) MÁ Reyes-Varela	3	4
(Netherlands) R Haase (Netherlands) J-J Rojer	6	6
(Chile) C Garín (Chile) N Jarry	5	6	[7]
3	(United Kingdom) J Murray (United Kingdom) N Skupski	7	3	[10]
(New Zealand) M Daniell (Netherlands) W Koolhof	6	6
Alt	(Italy) A Seppi (Portugal) J Sousa	1	4
(Czech Republic) R Jebavý (Slovakia) I Zelenay	6	5	[7]
2	(South Africa) R Klaasen (New Zealand) M Venus	4	7	[10]

Quarterfinals
1	(Poland) Ł Kubot (Brazil) M Melo	7	3	[3]
(United Kingdom) D Inglot (United States) A Krajicek	5	6	[10]
4	(United States) R Ram (United Kingdom) J Salisbury	3	6	[8]
(Australia) A de Minaur (Spain) D Vega Hernández	6	4	[10]
(Netherlands) R Haase (Netherlands) J-J Rojer	7	6
3	(United Kingdom) J Murray (United Kingdom) N Skupski	5	3
(New Zealand) M Daniell (Netherlands) W Koolhof	6	7^{7}
2	(South Africa) R Klaasen (New Zealand) M Venus	4	6^{3}

Semifinals
(United Kingdom) D Inglot (United States) A Krajicek	7^{7}	6
(Australia) A de Minaur (Spain) D Vega Hernández	6^{5}	3
(Netherlands) R Haase (Netherlands) J-J Rojer	3	6	[5]
(New Zealand) M Daniell (Netherlands) W Koolhof	6	4	[10]

Final
(United Kingdom) D Inglot (United States) A Krajicek	6	4	[10]
(New Zealand) M Daniell (Netherlands) W Koolhof	4	6	[4]
