= 2018 Fuzion 100 Southsea Trophy – Doubles =

Doubles
- 2018 Fuzion 100 Southsea Trophy

Final
- Champions: (Belgium) Kirsten Flipkens (Sweden) Johanna Larsson
- Runners-up: (Poland) Alicja Rosolska (United States) Abigail Spears
- Score: 6–4, 3–6, [11–9]

Events
Singles	Doubles
← 2017 ·	Southsea Trophy

Shuko Aoyama and Yang Zhaoxuan are the defending champions, however Yang chose to participate in Eastbourne. Aoyama played alongside Monica Niculescu but lost in the semifinals to Alicja Rosolska and Abigail Spears.

Kirsten Flipkens and Johanna Larsson won the title after defeating Rosolska and Spears 6–4, 3–6, [11–9] in the final.

== Seeds ==
1. (Japan) Shuko Aoyama / (Romania) Monica Niculescu (semifinals)
2. (Belgium) Kirsten Flipkens / (Sweden) Johanna Larsson (champions)

== Draw ==
=== Key ===
- Q = Qualifier
- WC = Wild card
- LL = Lucky loser
- Alt = Alternate
- ITF = ITF entry
- PR = Protected ranking
- SR = Special ranking
- SE = Special exempt
- JE = Junior exempt
- JR = Junior Accelerator Programme entrant
- CO = College Accelerator Programme entrant
- NG = Next Gen Accelerator Program entrant
- w/o = Walkover
- r = Retired
- d = Defaulted

=== Draw ===
First round
(United States) K Christian (Mexico) G Olmos	7	2	[12]
(Poland) A Rosolska (United States) A Spears	5	6	[14]
(Australia) M Adamczak (Czech Republic) R Voráčová	7	2	[9]
(Belarus) L Marozava (Romania) R Olaru	5	6	[11]

Semifinals
1	(Japan) S Aoyama (Romania) M Niculescu	3	2
(Poland) A Rosolska (United States) A Spears	6	6
(Belarus) L Marozava (Romania) R Olaru	4	5
2	(Belgium) K Flipkens (Sweden) J Larsson	6	7

Final
(Poland) A Rosolska (United States) A Spears	4	6	[9]
2	(Belgium) K Flipkens (Sweden) J Larsson	6	3	[11]
