= 2019 Libéma Open – Men's singles =

Men's singles
- 2019 Libéma Open

Final
- Champion: (France) Adrian Mannarino
- Runner-up: (Australia) Jordan Thompson
- Score: 7–6^{(9–7)}, 6–3

Details
- Draw: 28 (4 Q / 3 WC )
- Seeds: 8

Events
Singles	men	women
Doubles	men	women
← 2018 ·	Libéma Open	· 2022 →

Adrian Mannarino defeated Jordan Thompson in the final, 7–6^{(9–7)}, 6–3 to win the men's singles tennis title at the 2019 Rosmalen Grass Court Championships. It was Mannarino's maiden ATP Tour singles title in his seventh final. Thompson was also contesting for his maiden title.

Richard Gasquet was the defending champion, but lost to Thompson in the semifinals.

== Seeds ==
The top four seeds receive a bye into the second round.

1. (Greece) Stefanos Tsitsipas (second round)
2. (Croatia) Borna Ćorić (semifinals)
3. (Australia) Alex de Minaur (quarterfinals)
4. (Spain) Fernando Verdasco (second round)
5. (Belgium) David Goffin (quarterfinals)
6. (United States) Frances Tiafoe (second round)
7. (Chile) Cristian Garín (quarterfinals)
8. (France) Richard Gasquet (semifinals)

== Draw ==
=== Key ===
- Q = Qualifier
- WC = Wild card
- LL = Lucky loser
- Alt = Alternate
- SE = Special exempt
- PR = Protected ranking
- ITF = ITF entry
- JE = Junior exempt
- w/o = Walkover
- r = Retired
- d = Defaulted
- SR = Special ranking

=== Finals ===
Semifinals
8	(France) Richard Gasquet	5	3
(Australia) Jordan Thompson	7	6
(France) Adrian Mannarino	4	6	7^{7}
2/WC	(Croatia) Borna Ćorić	6	3	6^{4}

Final
(Australia) Jordan Thompson	6^{7}	3
(France) Adrian Mannarino	7^{9}	6

=== Top half ===
First round
Q	(Italy) J Sinner	6^{4}	3
(Chile) N Jarry	7^{7}	6
(Italy) L Sonego	7	4	4
(Kazakhstan) M Kukushkin	5	6	6
(Slovenia) A Bedene	7^{7}	6^{5}	4
8	(France) R Gasquet	6^{3}	7^{7}	6
LL	(Italy) T Fabbiano	6^{10}	5
(Italy) A Seppi	7^{12}	7
(Australia) J Thompson	3	6	6
Q	(United States) T Paul	6	1	4
(Portugal) J Sousa	2	6^{0}
6	(United States) F Tiafoe	6	7^{7}

Second round
1	(Greece) S Tsitsipas	4	6	4
(Chile) N Jarry	6	3	6
(Kazakhstan) M Kukushkin	4	3
8	(France) R Gasquet	6	6
3	(Australia) A de Minaur	7	6
(Italy) A Seppi	5	3
(Australia) J Thompson	6	6
6	(United States) F Tiafoe	3	2

Quarterfinals
(Chile) N Jarry	6^{8}	4
8	(France) R Gasquet	7^{10}	6
3	(Australia) A de Minaur	6	2	3
(Australia) J Thompson	4	6	6

Semifinals
8	(France) R Gasquet	5	3
(Australia) J Thompson	7	6

=== Bottom half ===
First round
5	(Belgium) D Goffin	6	6
Q	(Spain) A Davidovich Fokina	0	2
(Australia) M Ebden	4	5
(France) P-H Herbert	6	7
WC	(Netherlands) T de Bakker	2	1
(France) A Mannarino	6	6
7	(Chile) C Garín	6	6
Q	(Italy) S Caruso	1	4
(Netherlands) R Haase	5	7^{7}	7^{7}
(France) U Humbert	7	6^{2}	6^{4}
WC	(Austria) J Rodionov	6^{2}	4
(United States) T Fritz	7^{7}	6

Second round
5	(Belgium) D Goffin	6	7
(France) P-H Herbert	3	5
(France) A Mannarino	1	6	6
4	(Spain) F Verdasco	6	3	4
7	(Chile) C Garín	7	7
(Netherlands) R Haase	5	5
(United States) T Fritz	6	3	3
2/WC	(Croatia) B Ćorić	4	6	6

Quarterfinals
5	(Belgium) D Goffin	6	5	3
(France) A Mannarino	4	7	6
7	(Chile) C Garín	7^{7}	3	6^{6}
2/WC	(Croatia) B Ćorić	6^{4}	6	7^{8}

Semifinals
(France) A Mannarino	4	6	7^{7}
2/WC	(Croatia) B Ćorić	6	3	6^{4}

== Qualifying ==
=== Seeds ===
1. (United States) Bradley Klahn (first round)
2. (Italy) Thomas Fabbiano (qualifying competition, lucky loser)
3. (Chinese Taipei) Jason Jung (first round)
4. (Australia) Alex Bolt (first round)
5. (United States) Tommy Paul (qualified)
6. (Spain) Alejandro Davidovich Fokina (qualified)
7. (Slovakia) Lukáš Lacko (first round)
8. (Italy) Salvatore Caruso (qualified)

=== Qualifiers ===
1. (Spain) Alejandro Davidovich Fokina
2. (Italy) Jannik Sinner
3. (Italy) Salvatore Caruso
4. (United States) Tommy Paul

=== Lucky loser ===
1. (Italy) Thomas Fabbiano

=== Qualifying draw ===
==== First qualifier ====
First round
1	(United States) Bradley Klahn	6	4	2
(Italy) Andrea Arnaboldi	4	6	6
WC	(France) Nicolas Mahut	2	4
6	(Spain) Alejandro Davidovich Fokina	6	6

Qualifying competition
(Italy) Andrea Arnaboldi	6^{5}	5
6	(Spain) Alejandro Davidovich Fokina	7^{7}	7

==== Second qualifier ====
First round
2	(Italy) Thomas Fabbiano	4	6	6
WC	(Finland) Emil Ruusuvuori	6	3	1
Alt	(Italy) Jannik Sinner	6^{6}	7^{7}	6
7	(Slovakia) Lukáš Lacko	7^{8}	6^{5}	2

Qualifying competition
2	(Italy) Thomas Fabbiano	4	2
Alt	(Italy) Jannik Sinner	6	6

==== Third qualifier ====
First round
3	(Chinese Taipei) Jason Jung	2	7	2
(United States) Marcos Giron	6	5	6
(Slovakia) Filip Horanský	3	2
8	(Italy) Salvatore Caruso	6	6

Qualifying competition
(United States) Marcos Giron	3	6	3
8	(Italy) Salvatore Caruso	6	3	6

==== Fourth qualifier ====
First round
4	(Australia) Alex Bolt	4	2
(Germany) Daniel Brands	6	6
(Belarus) Egor Gerasimov	4	3
5	(United States) Tommy Paul	6	6

Qualifying competition
(Germany) Daniel Brands	5	4
5	(United States) Tommy Paul	7	6
