= 2017 Aegon Southsea Trophy – Doubles =

Tennis tournament

Doubles
- 2017 Aegon Southsea Trophy

Final
- Champion: (Japan) Shuko Aoyama (China) Yang Zhaoxuan
- Runner-up: (Switzerland) Viktorija Golubic (Ukraine) Lyudmyla Kichenok
- Score: 6–7^{(7–9)}, 6–3, [10–8]

Events
Singles	Doubles
Aegon Southsea Trophy	· 2018 →

This was the first edition of the tournament.

Shuko Aoyama and Yang Zhaoxuan won the title, defeating Viktorija Golubic and Lyudmyla Kichenok in the final 6–7^{(7–9)}, 6–3, [10–8].

== Seeds ==
1. (Japan) Shuko Aoyama / (China) Yang Zhaoxuan (champions)
2. (Romania) Irina-Camelia Begu / (Romania) Raluca Olaru (first round)

== Draw ==
=== Key ===
- Q = Qualifier
- WC = Wild card
- LL = Lucky loser
- Alt = Alternate
- ITF = ITF entry
- PR = Protected ranking
- SR = Special ranking
- SE = Special exempt
- JE = Junior exempt
- JR = Junior Accelerator Programme entrant
- CO = College Accelerator Programme entrant
- NG = Next Gen Accelerator Program entrant
- w/o = Walkover
- r = Retired
- d = Defaulted

First round
1	(Japan) S Aoyama (China) Z Yang	6	6
WC	(United Kingdom) A Pitak (United Kingdom) K Pitak	0	2
(United Kingdom) J Rae (United Kingdom) L Robson	3	3
(Japan) M Ninomiya (Czech Republic) R Voráčová	6	6
(China) X Han (Russia) E Rodina	4	6	[4]
(Georgia (country)) O Kalashnikova (United States) M Sanchez	6	3	[10]
(Switzerland) V Golubic (Ukraine) L Kichenok	6	5	[10]
2	(Romania) I-C Begu (Romania) R Olaru	2	7	[4]

Semifinals
1	(Japan) S Aoyama (China) Z Yang	6	7
(Japan) M Ninomiya (Czech Republic) R Voráčová	2	5
(Georgia (country)) O Kalashnikova (United States) M Sanchez	2	4
(Switzerland) V Golubic (Ukraine) L Kichenok	6	6

Final
1	(Japan) S Aoyama (China) Z Yang	6^{7}	6	[10]
(Switzerland) V Golubic (Ukraine) L Kichenok	7^{9}	3	[8]
