= 2018 Libéma Open – Men's singles =

Men's singles
- 2018 Libéma Open

Final
- Champion: (France) Richard Gasquet
- Runner-up: (France) Jérémy Chardy
- Score: 6–3, 7–6^{(7–5)}

Details
- Draw: 28 (4 Q / 3 WC )
- Seeds: 8

Events
Singles	men	women
Doubles	men	women
← 2017 ·	Libéma Open	· 2019 →

Gilles Müller was the defending champion, but lost in the second round to Matthew Ebden.

Richard Gasquet won the title, defeating Jérémy Chardy in the final, 6–3, 7–6^{(7–5)}.

== Seeds ==
The top four seeds receive a bye into the second round.

1. (France) Adrian Mannarino (second round)
2. (France) Richard Gasquet (champion)
3. (Luxembourg) Gilles Müller (second round)
4. (Spain) Fernando Verdasco (quarterfinals)
5. (Greece) Stefanos Tsitsipas (quarterfinals)
6. (Netherlands) Robin Haase (second round)
7. (Japan) Yūichi Sugita (second round)
8. (Italy) Andreas Seppi (first round)

== Draw ==
=== Key ===
- Q = Qualifier
- WC = Wild card
- LL = Lucky loser
- Alt = Alternate
- SE = Special exempt
- PR = Protected ranking
- ITF = ITF entry
- JE = Junior exempt
- w/o = Walkover
- r = Retired
- d = Defaulted
- SR = Special ranking

=== Finals ===
Semifinals
(France) Jérémy Chardy	6	7
(Australia) Matthew Ebden	4	5
Q	(Australia) Bernard Tomic	4	7^{8}	2
2	(France) Richard Gasquet	6	6^{6}	6

Final
(France) Jérémy Chardy	3	6^{5}
2	(France) Richard Gasquet	6	7^{7}

=== Top half ===
First round
(Spain) G García López	4	7^{9}	6^{4}
(France) J Chardy	6	6^{7}	7^{7}
Q	(Australia) A Bolt	4	7^{7}	6
(Canada) V Pospisil	6	6^{5}	2
WC	(United States) M McDonald	6	6
8	(Italy) A Seppi	4	2
(Australia) M Ebden	6	6
LL	(United States) T Smyczek	2	3
(Slovenia) A Bedene	7^{8}	6^{4}	3
(Romania) M Copil	6^{6}	7^{7}	6
(Georgia (country)) N Basilashvili	3	2
7	(Japan) Y Sugita	6	6

Second round
1	(France) A Mannarino	4	4
(France) J Chardy	6	6
Q	(Australia) A Bolt	4	5
WC	(United States) M McDonald	6	7
3	(Luxembourg) G Müller	3	5
(Australia) M Ebden	6	7
(Romania) M Copil	7	4	6
7	(Japan) Y Sugita	5	6	4

Quarterfinals
(France) J Chardy	6	4	7^{7}
WC	(United States) M McDonald	4	6	6^{5}
(Australia) M Ebden	6	6
(Romania) M Copil	3	3

Semifinals
(France) J Chardy	6	7
(Australia) M Ebden	4	5

=== Bottom half ===
First round
6	(Netherlands) R Haase	7^{7}	6^{5}	6
(Croatia) I Karlović	6^{3}	7^{7}	3
Q	(Australia) B Tomic	6	6
LL	(United States) K King	4	2
(Russia) D Medvedev	6	6
(India) Y Bhambri	4	1
5/WC	(Greece) S Tsitsipas	3	6	6
LL	(Australia) J-P Smith	6	3	4
(Tunisia) M Jaziri	6	6
Q	(Australia) M Purcell	2	3
(Russia) E Donskoy	6	6
Q	(Croatia) F Škugor	3	2

Second round
6	(Netherlands) R Haase	3	5
Q	(Australia) B Tomic	6	7
(Russia) D Medvedev	4	1
4	(Spain) F Verdasco	6	6
5/WC	(Greece) S Tsitsipas	4	7^{8}	6
(Tunisia) M Jaziri	6	6^{6}	2
(Russia) E Donskoy	2	2
2	(France) R Gasquet	6	6

Quarterfinals
Q	(Australia) B Tomic	6	7^{7}
4	(Spain) F Verdasco	4	6^{3}
5/WC	(Greece) S Tsitsipas	6^{2}	6^{4}
2	(France) R Gasquet	7^{7}	7^{7}

Semifinals
Q	(Australia) B Tomic	4	7^{8}	2
2	(France) R Gasquet	6	6^{6}	6

== Qualifying ==
=== Seeds ===
1. (Australia) Jordan Thompson (first round, retired)
2. (United States) Bjorn Fratangelo (first round)
3. (United States) Tim Smyczek (qualifying competition, lucky loser)
4. (United States) Donald Young (first round)
5. (Germany) Dustin Brown (first round)
6. (United States) Bradley Klahn (first round)
7. (United States) Kevin King (qualifying competition, lucky loser)
8. (Australia) Alex Bolt (qualified)

=== Qualifiers ===
1. (Croatia) Franko Škugor
2. (Australia) Max Purcell
3. (Australia) Bernard Tomic
4. (Australia) Alex Bolt

=== Lucky losers ===
1. (United States) Tim Smyczek
2. (United States) Kevin King
3. (Australia) John-Patrick Smith

=== Qualifying draw ===
==== First qualifier ====
First round
1	(Australia) Jordan Thompson	2	0^{r}
Alt	(Croatia) Franko Škugor	6	0
(United States) Dennis Novikov	6^{2}	2
7	(United States) Kevin King	7^{7}	6

Qualifying competition
Alt	(Croatia) Franko Škugor	7^{9}	6
7	(United States) Kevin King	6^{7}	3

==== Second qualifier ====
First round
2	(United States) Bjorn Fratangelo	3	6^{1}
(Australia) John-Patrick Smith	6	7^{7}
(Australia) Max Purcell	6	6
6	(United States) Bradley Klahn	2	2

Qualifying competition
(Australia) John-Patrick Smith	4	6^{1}
(Australia) Max Purcell	6	7^{7}

==== Third qualifier ====
First round
3	(United States) Tim Smyczek	7^{7}	6
(Spain) Bernabé Zapata Miralles	6^{4}	3
(Australia) Bernard Tomic	6	7^{7}
5	(Germany) Dustin Brown	4	6^{4}

Qualifying competition
3	(United States) Tim Smyczek	4	2
(Australia) Bernard Tomic	6	6

==== Fourth qualifier ====
First round
4	(United States) Donald Young	4	2
WC	(Netherlands) Miliaan Niesten	6	6
WC	(Netherlands) Botic van de Zandschulp	3	7	6^{5}
8	(Australia) Alex Bolt	6	5	7^{7}

Qualifying competition
WC	(Netherlands) Miliaan Niesten	3	3
8	(Australia) Alex Bolt	6	6
