= 2019 Libéma Open =

- Date: 10–16 June
- Edition: 30th
- Category: ATP Tour 250; WTA International
- Draw: 32S / 16D
- Prize money: €612,755 (ATP) €250,000 (WTA)
- Surface: Grass
- Location: Rosmalen, 's-Hertogenbosch, Netherlands

Champions

Men's singles
- (France) Adrian Mannarino

Women's singles
- (United States) Alison Riske

Men's doubles
- (United Kingdom) Dominic Inglot / (United States) Austin Krajicek

Women's doubles
- (Japan) Shuko Aoyama / (Serbia) Aleksandra Krunić
← 2018 ·	Libéma Open	· 2022 →

The 2019 Libéma Open was a tennis tournament played on outdoor grass courts. It was the 30th edition of the event, and part of the 250 Series of the 2019 ATP Tour, and of the WTA International tournaments of the 2019 WTA Tour. Both the men's and the women's events took place at the Autotron park in Rosmalen, 's-Hertogenbosch in the Netherlands, from June 10 through June 16, 2019.

== ATP singles main-draw entrants ==
=== Seeds ===
Country	Player	Rank^{1}	Seed
GRE	Stefanos Tsitsipas	6	1
CRO	Borna Ćorić	15	2
AUS	Alex de Minaur	25	3
ESP	Fernando Verdasco	27	4
BEL	David Goffin	29	5
USA	Frances Tiafoe	34	6
CHI	Cristian Garín	37	7
FRA	Richard Gasquet	39	8

- ^{1} Rankings are as of May 27, 2019.

=== Other entrants ===
The following players received wildcards into the main draw:

- (Croatia) Borna Ćorić
- (Netherlands) Thiemo de Bakker
- (Austria) Jurij Rodionov

The following players received entry from the qualifying draw:

- (Italy) Salvatore Caruso
- (Spain) Alejandro Davidovich Fokina
- (United States) Tommy Paul
- (Italy) Jannik Sinner

The following player received entry as a lucky loser:

- (Italy) Thomas Fabbiano

=== Withdrawals ===
Before the tournament

- (Moldova) Radu Albot → replaced by (France) Ugo Humbert
- (France) Jérémy Chardy → replaced by (Italy) Thomas Fabbiano
- (Bulgaria) Grigor Dimitrov → replaced by (Italy) Lorenzo Sonego
- (Bosnia and Herzegovina) Damir Džumhur → replaced by (Chile) Nicolás Jarry
- (United States) Mackenzie McDonald → replaced by (Slovenia) Aljaž Bedene

== ATP doubles main-draw entrants ==
=== Seeds ===
Country	Player	Country	Player	Rank^{1}	Seed
POL	Łukasz Kubot	BRA	Marcelo Melo	6	1
RSA	Raven Klaasen	NZL	Michael Venus	28	2
GBR	Jamie Murray	GBR	Neal Skupski	35	3
USA	Rajeev Ram	GBR	Joe Salisbury	47	4

- ^{1} Rankings are as of May 27, 2019.

=== Other entrants ===
The following pairs received wildcards into the doubles main draw:

- (Netherlands) Thiemo de Bakker / (Netherlands) David Pel
- (Australia) Lleyton Hewitt / (Australia) Jordan Thompson

The following pair received entry as alternates:

- (Italy) Andreas Seppi / (Portugal) João Sousa

=== Withdrawals ===
Before the tournament

- (France) Jérémy Chardy

== WTA singles main-draw entrants ==
=== Seeds ===
Country	Player	Rank^{1}	Seed
NED	Kiki Bertens	4	1
BLR	Aryna Sabalenka	11	2
BEL	Elise Mertens	20	3
UKR	Lesia Tsurenko	27	4
~~CRO~~	~~Petra Martić~~	~~31~~	~~5~~
~~CHN~~	~~Zheng Saisai~~	~~45~~	~~6~~
SVK	Viktória Kužmová	46	7
~~USA~~	~~Amanda Anisimova~~	~~51~~	~~8~~
BEL	Alison Van Uytvanck	54	9

- ^{1} Rankings are as of May 27, 2019.

=== Other entrants ===
The following players received wildcards into the main draw:

- (Australia) Destanee Aiava
- (Netherlands) Arantxa Rus
- (Netherlands) Bibiane Schoofs

The following players received entry from the qualifying draw:

- (Spain) Paula Badosa
- (Belgium) Ysaline Bonaventure
- (Australia) Priscilla Hon
- (United States) Varvara Lepchenko
- (Belgium) Greet Minnen
- (Kazakhstan) Elena Rybakina

The following players received entry as lucky losers:

- (France) Fiona Ferro
- (Russia) Anna Kalinskaya
- (United States) Christina McHale

=== Withdrawals ===
Before the tournament

- (United States) Amanda Anisimova → replaced by (Russia) Anna Kalinskaya
- (Switzerland) Belinda Bencic → replaced by (Czech Republic) Kristýna Plíšková
- (United States) Danielle Collins → replaced by (Czech Republic) Karolína Muchová
- (Croatia) Petra Martić → replaced by (United States) Christina McHale
- (Latvia) Jeļena Ostapenko → replaced by (Sweden) Johanna Larsson
- (Germany) Andrea Petkovic → replaced by (Germany) Mona Barthel
- (China) Zheng Saisai → replaced by (France) Fiona Ferro

== WTA doubles main-draw entrants ==
=== Seeds ===
Country	Player	Country	Player	Rank^{1}	Seed
USA	Nicole Melichar	CZE	Květa Peschke	29	1
NED	Kiki Bertens	NED	Demi Schuurs	76	2
AUS	Monique Adamczak	USA	Kaitlyn Christian	105	3
JPN	Shuko Aoyama	SRB	Aleksandra Krunić	115	4

- ^{1} Rankings are as of May 27, 2019.

=== Other entrants ===
The following pairs received wildcards into the doubles main draw:

- (Netherlands) Lesley Kerkhove / (Netherlands) Bibiane Schoofs
- (Netherlands) Michaëlla Krajicek / (Netherlands) Arantxa Rus

== Champions ==
=== Men's singles ===
- (France) Adrian Mannarino def. (Australia) Jordan Thompson, 7–6^{(9–7)}, 6–3

=== Women's singles ===
- (United States) Alison Riske def. (Netherlands) Kiki Bertens, 0–6, 7–6^{(7–3)}, 7–5

=== Men's doubles ===
- (United Kingdom) Dominic Inglot / (United States) Austin Krajicek def. (New Zealand) Marcus Daniell / (Netherlands) Wesley Koolhof, 6–4, 4–6, [10–4]

=== Women's doubles ===
- (Japan) Shuko Aoyama / (Serbia) Aleksandra Krunić def. (Netherlands) Lesley Kerkhove / (Netherlands) Bibiane Schoofs, 7–5, 6–3
