= 2018 Libéma Open – Women's doubles =

Women's doubles
- 2018 Libéma Open

Final
- Champions: (Belgium) Elise Mertens (Netherlands) Demi Schuurs
- Runners-up: (Netherlands) Kiki Bertens (Belgium) Kirsten Flipkens
- Score: 3–3, retired

Details
- Draw: 16
- Seeds: 4

Events
Singles	men	women
Doubles	men	women
← 2017 ·	Libéma Open	· 2019 →

Dominika Cibulková and Kirsten Flipkens were the defending champions, but Cibulková chose not to participate this year. Flipkens played alongside Kiki Bertens, but lost in the final to Elise Mertens and Demi Schuurs when Flipkens had to retire with the score at 3–3.

== Seeds ==
1. (Belgium) Elise Mertens / (Netherlands) Demi Schuurs (champions)
2. (Netherlands) Kiki Bertens / (Belgium) Kirsten Flipkens (final, retired)
3. (Netherlands) Lesley Kerkhove / (Belarus) Lidziya Marozava (semifinals)
4. (Switzerland) Xenia Knoll / (United Kingdom) Anna Smith (semifinals)

== Draw ==
=== Key ===
- Q = Qualifier
- WC = Wild card
- LL = Lucky loser
- Alt = Alternate
- ITF = ITF entry
- PR = Protected ranking
- SR = Special ranking
- SE = Special exempt
- JE = Junior exempt
- JR = Junior Accelerator Programme entrant
- CO = College Accelerator Programme entrant
- NG = Next Gen Accelerator Program entrant
- w/o = Walkover
- r = Retired
- d = Defaulted

=== Draw ===
First round
1	(Belgium) E Mertens (Netherlands) D Schuurs	6	6
(United States) K Christian (United States) S Santamaria	3	3
(Russia) V Kudermetova (Belarus) A Sabalenka	7	6
(Croatia) D Jurak (Sweden) C Lister	5	3
3	(Netherlands) L Kerkhove (Belarus) L Marozava	6	5	[10]
WC	(Netherlands) R Hogenkamp (Netherlands) B Schoofs	2	7	[7]
(Slovenia) P Hercog (Serbia) A Krunić	5	6	[7]
(Japan) R Fujiwara (China) S Zhang	7	3	[10]
(Estonia) A Kontaveit (Belarus) A Sasnovich	4	7^{8}	[7]
(Australia) J Moore (Australia) E Perez	6	6^{6}	[10]
(Russia) A Blinkova (Germany) N Geuer	6^{6}	3
4	(Switzerland) X Knoll (United Kingdom) A Smith	7^{8}	6
(Hungary) F Stollár (Czech Republic) R Voráčová	2	0
WC	(Netherlands) A Rus (Netherlands) E Wacanno	6	6
(Georgia (country)) O Kalashnikova (Germany) T Maria	6	1	[6]
2	(Netherlands) K Bertens (Belgium) K Flipkens	4	6	[10]

Quarterfinals
1	(Belgium) E Mertens (Netherlands) D Schuurs	6	3	[10]
(Russia) V Kudermetova (Belarus) A Sabalenka	2	6	[5]
3	(Netherlands) L Kerkhove (Belarus) L Marozava	6	6
(Japan) R Fujiwara (China) S Zhang	2	2
(Australia) J Moore (Australia) E Perez	6	2	[8]
4	(Switzerland) X Knoll (United Kingdom) A Smith	4	6	[10]
WC	(Netherlands) A Rus (Netherlands) E Wacanno	0	3
2	(Netherlands) K Bertens (Belgium) K Flipkens	6	6

Semifinals
1	(Belgium) E Mertens (Netherlands) D Schuurs	6	6
3	(Netherlands) L Kerkhove (Belarus) L Marozava	4	3
4	(Switzerland) X Knoll (United Kingdom) A Smith	3	3
2	(Netherlands) K Bertens (Belgium) K Flipkens	6	6

Final
1	(Belgium) E Mertens (Netherlands) D Schuurs	3
2	(Netherlands) K Bertens (Belgium) K Flipkens	3^{r}
