= 2018 Fuzion 100 Southsea Trophy – Singles =

Singles
- 2018 Fuzion 100 Southsea Trophy

Final
- Champion: (Belgium) Kirsten Flipkens
- Runner-up: (United Kingdom) Katie Boulter
- Score: 6–4, 5–7, 6–3

Events
Singles	Doubles
← 2017 ·	Southsea Trophy

Tatjana Maria was the defending champion, but withdrew before the event started.

Kirsten Flipkens won the title, defeating wildcard Katie Boulter in the final, 6–4, 5–7, 6–3.

== Seeds ==
1. (Croatia) Petra Martić (first round)
2. (Belgium) Kirsten Flipkens (champion)
3. (Romania) Monica Niculescu (first round)
4. (Sweden) Johanna Larsson (first round)

== Draw ==
=== Key ===
- Q = Qualifier
- WC = Wild card
- LL = Lucky loser
- Alt = Alternate
- ITF = ITF entry
- PR = Protected ranking
- SR = Special ranking
- SE = Special exempt
- JE = Junior exempt
- JR = Junior Accelerator Programme entrant
- CO = College Accelerator Programme entrant
- NG = Next Gen Accelerator Program entrant
- w/o = Walkover
- r = Retired
- d = Defaulted

=== Draw ===
First round
1	(Croatia) P Martić	6	5	4
(Poland) M Linette	4	7	6
(United States) J Brady	6	6
WC	(United Kingdom) G Taylor	2	4
3	(Romania) M Niculescu	3	2
(Slovakia) AK Schmiedlová	6	6
WC	(United Kingdom) K Boulter	6	6
(Russia) E Alexandrova	4	2
(France) P Parmentier	6	1	7^{7}
(Germany) C Witthöft	4	6	6^{4}
Alt	(Czech Republic) R Voráčová	7^{7}	2	6
4	(Sweden) J Larsson	6^{2}	6	2
(Switzerland) S Vögele	4	4
(Belarus) V Lapko	6	6
(Ukraine) K Kozlova	2	3
2	(Belgium) K Flipkens	6	6

Quarterfinals
(Poland) M Linette	4	3
(United States) J Brady	6	6
(Slovakia) AK Schmiedlová	2	0
WC	(United Kingdom) K Boulter	6	6
(France) P Parmentier	7	6
Alt	(Czech Republic) R Voráčová	5	1
(Belarus) V Lapko	3	6	4
2	(Belgium) K Flipkens	6	3	6

Semifinals
(United States) J Brady	3	3
WC	(United Kingdom) K Boulter	6	6
(France) P Parmentier	3	2
2	(Belgium) K Flipkens	6	6

Final
WC	(United Kingdom) K Boulter	4	7	3
2	(Belgium) K Flipkens	6	5	6
