= 2019 Libéma Open – Women's doubles =

Women's doubles
- 2019 Libéma Open

Final
- Champions: (Japan) Shuko Aoyama (Serbia) Aleksandra Krunić
- Runners-up: (Netherlands) Lesley Kerkhove (Netherlands) Bibiane Schoofs
- Score: 7–5, 6–3

Details
- Draw: 16
- Seeds: 4

Events
Singles	men	women
Doubles	men	women
- Libéma Open

Shuko Aoyama and Aleksandra Krunić defeated Lesley Kerkhove and Bibiane Schoofs in the final, 7–5, 6–3, to win the women's doubles tennis title at the 2019 Rosmalen Grass Court Championships.

Kerkhove and Schoofs defeated defending champion Demi Schuurs in the semifinals, who partnered with Kiki Bertens in her title defense after Elise Mertens chose not to compete.

== Seeds ==
1. (United States) Nicole Melichar / (Czech Republic) Květa Peschke (first round)
2. (Netherlands) Kiki Bertens / (Netherlands) Demi Schuurs (semifinals)
3. (Australia) Monique Adamczak / (United States) Kaitlyn Christian (first round)
4. (Japan) Shuko Aoyama / (Serbia) Aleksandra Krunić (champions)

== Draw ==
Key

- Q = Qualifier
- WC = Wild card
- LL = Lucky loser
- Alt = Alternate
- ITF = ITF entry
- PR = Protected ranking
- SR = Special ranking
- SE = Special exempt
- JE = Junior exempt
- JR = Junior Accelerator Programme entrant
- CO = College Accelerator Programme entrant
- NG = Next Gen Accelerator Program entrant
- w/o = Walkover
- r = Retired
- d = Defaulted

=== Draw ===
First round
1	(United States) N Melichar (Czech Republic) K Peschke	6	3	[7]
(Ukraine) L Tsurenko (China) Y Wang	0	6	[10]
(Belarus) L Marozava (Australia) S Sanders	2	6	[7]
(Czech Republic) Kr Plíšková (Czech Republic) B Štefková	6	1	[10]
4	(Japan) S Aoyama (Serbia) A Krunić	6	6
(United States) A Anisimova (Australia) P Hon	4	0
(Russia) E Alexandrova (Kazakhstan) G Voskoboeva	6	7
(Germany) M Barthel (Romania) A Mitu	3	5
(Russia) A Kalinskaya (Slovakia) V Kužmová	6	3	[2]
WC	(Netherlands) L Kerkhove (Netherlands) B Schoofs	1	6	[10]
(Germany) N Geuer (Poland) P Kania	3	6	[10]
3	(Australia) M Adamczak (United States) K Christian	6	2	[5]
(Spain) G García Pérez (Hungary) F Stollár	7^{8}	7^{7}
WC	(Netherlands) M Krajicek (Netherlands) A Rus	6^{6}	6^{4}
(United States) C McHale (United States) A Riske	6	2	[9]
2	(Netherlands) K Bertens (Netherlands) D Schuurs	3	6	[11]

Quarterfinals
(Ukraine) L Tsurenko (China) Y Wang	6	6
(Czech Republic) Kr Plíšková (Czech Republic) B Štefková	3	2
4	(Japan) S Aoyama (Serbia) A Krunić	6	7^{7}
(Russia) E Alexandrova (Kazakhstan) G Voskoboeva	2	6^{4}
WC	(Netherlands) L Kerkhove (Netherlands) B Schoofs	6	7
(Germany) N Geuer (Poland) P Kania	3	5
(Spain) G García Pérez (Hungary) F Stollár	5	2
2	(Netherlands) K Bertens (Netherlands) D Schuurs	7	6

Semifinals
(Ukraine) L Tsurenko (China) Y Wang	3	6	[11]
4	(Japan) S Aoyama (Serbia) A Krunić	6	3	[13]
WC	(Netherlands) L Kerkhove (Netherlands) B Schoofs	6	6
2	(Netherlands) K Bertens (Netherlands) D Schuurs	1	4

Final
4	(Japan) S Aoyama (Serbia) A Krunić	7	6
WC	(Netherlands) L Kerkhove (Netherlands) B Schoofs	5	3
