= 2018 Libéma Open – Women's singles =

Women's singles
- 2018 Libéma Open

Final
- Champion: (Serbia) Aleksandra Krunić
- Runner-up: (Belgium) Kirsten Flipkens
- Score: 6–7^{(0–7)}, 7–5, 6–1

Details
- Draw: 32 (6 Q / 3 WC )
- Seeds: 8

Events
Singles	men	women
Doubles	men	women
← 2017 ·	Libéma Open	· 2019 →

Anett Kontaveit was the defending champion, but lost in the first round to Veronika Kudermetova.

Aleksandra Krunić won her first WTA singles title, defeating Kirsten Flipkens in the final, 6–7^{(0–7)}, 7–5, 6–1.

== Seeds ==
1. (United States) CoCo Vandeweghe (semifinals)
2. (Belgium) Elise Mertens (second round)
3. (Netherlands) Kiki Bertens (second round)
4. (Estonia) Anett Kontaveit (first round)
5. (China) Zhang Shuai (first round)
6. (Belgium) Alison Van Uytvanck (second round)
7. (Serbia) Aleksandra Krunić (champion)
8. (Belarus) Aryna Sabalenka (quarterfinals)

== Draw ==
=== Key ===
- Q = Qualifier
- WC = Wild card
- LL = Lucky loser
- Alt = Alternate
- ITF = ITF entry
- PR = Protected ranking
- SR = Special ranking
- SE = Special exempt
- JE = Junior exempt
- JR = Junior Accelerator Programme entrant
- CO = College Accelerator Programme entrant
- NG = Next Gen Accelerator Program entrant
- w/o = Walkover
- r = Retired
- d = Defaulted

=== Finals ===
Semifinals
1	(United States) CoCo Vandeweghe	6	6^{4}	6^{1}
7	(Serbia) Aleksandra Krunić	2	7^{7}	7^{7}
(Belgium) Kirsten Flipkens	7	6^{7}	6
(Slovakia) Viktória Kužmová	5	7^{9}	4

Final
7	(Serbia) Aleksandra Krunić	6^{0}	7	6
(Belgium) Kirsten Flipkens	7^{7}	5	1

=== Top half ===
First round
1	(United States) C Vandeweghe	6	7^{7}
(Belarus) A Sasnovich	2	6^{1}
(Netherlands) A Rus	6^{5}	6	7^{9}
(Russia) E Alexandrova	7^{7}	4	6^{7}
(Germany) T Maria	4	6^{2}
(United States) A Riske	6	7^{7}
Q	(Hungary) F Stollár	6	6
5	(China) S Zhang	3	3
4	(Estonia) A Kontaveit	4	6^{4}
Q	(Russia) V Kudermetova	6	7^{7}
(Switzerland) B Bencic	6	6
LL	(Czech Republic) T Martincová	2	4
(Germany) C Witthöft	4	5
WC	(Netherlands) B Schoofs	6	7
Q	(Greece) V Grammatikopoulou	1	0
7	(Serbia) A Krunić	6	6

Second round
1	(United States) C Vandeweghe	7^{7}	6
(Netherlands) A Rus	6^{4}	3
(United States) A Riske	7^{7}	6
Q	(Hungary) F Stollár	6^{1}	2
Q	(Russia) V Kudermetova	6	2	6
(Switzerland) B Bencic	2	6	3
WC	(Netherlands) B Schoofs	5	2
7	(Serbia) A Krunić	7	6

Quarterfinals
1	(United States) C Vandeweghe	7^{8}	3	7^{14}
(United States) A Riske	6^{6}	6	6^{12}
Q	(Russia) V Kudermetova	2	2
7	(Serbia) A Krunić	6	6

Semifinals
1	(United States) C Vandeweghe	6	6^{4}	6^{1}
7	(Serbia) A Krunić	2	7^{7}	7^{7}

=== Bottom half ===
First round
8	(Belarus) A Sabalenka	0	7	6
(Czech Republic) M Vondroušová	6	5	3
(Czech Republic) Kr Plíšková	6	6^{3}	2
(Australia) A Tomljanović	4	7^{7}	6
WC	(Russia) A Kalinskaya	3	0
(Belgium) K Flipkens	6	6
(Russia) N Vikhlyantseva	7	3	6^{5}
3	(Netherlands) K Bertens	5	6	7^{7}
6	(Belgium) A Van Uytvanck	6	6
WC	(Netherlands) R Hogenkamp	1	2
Q	(Russia) M Melnikova	2	2
(Slovakia) V Kužmová	6	6
Q	(Russia) A Blinkova	2	6	2
Q	(Germany) A Lottner	6	3	6
(Slovenia) P Hercog	2	4
2	(Belgium) E Mertens	6	6

Second round
8	(Belarus) A Sabalenka	3	7^{7}	6
(Australia) A Tomljanović	6	6^{5}	0
(Belgium) K Flipkens	6	6^{6}	6
3	(Netherlands) K Bertens	4	7^{8}	1
6	(Belgium) A Van Uytvanck	6	6^{4}	2
(Slovakia) V Kužmová	3	7^{7}	6
Q	(Germany) A Lottner	7	6
2	(Belgium) E Mertens	5	3

Quarterfinals
8	(Belarus) A Sabalenka	4	4
(Belgium) K Flipkens	6	6
(Slovakia) V Kužmová	6	6
Q	(Germany) A Lottner	3	2

Semifinals
(Belgium) K Flipkens	7	6^{7}	6
(Slovakia) V Kužmová	5	7^{9}	4

== Qualifying ==
=== Seeds ===
1. (Russia) Anna Blinkova (qualified)
2. (Germany) Antonia Lottner (qualified)
3. (Czech Republic) Tereza Martincová (qualifying competition, lucky loser)
4. (Hungary) Fanny Stollár (qualified)
5. (Russia) Veronika Kudermetova (qualified)
6. (Greece) Valentini Grammatikopoulou (qualified)
7. (Austria) Barbara Haas (first round)
8. (Netherlands) Lesley Kerkhove (qualifying competition)
9. (Mexico) Renata Zarazúa (qualifying competition)
10. (United States) Victoria Duval (qualifying competition)
11. (Australia) Ellen Perez (first round)
12. (Russia) Marina Melnikova (qualified)

=== Qualifiers ===
1. (Russia) Anna Blinkova
2. (Germany) Antonia Lottner
3. (Russia) Marina Melnikova
4. (Hungary) Fanny Stollár
5. (Russia) Veronika Kudermetova
6. (Greece) Valentini Grammatikopoulou

=== Lucky loser ===
1. (Czech Republic) Tereza Martincová

=== Qualifying draw ===
==== First qualifier ====
First round
1	(Russia) Anna Blinkova	6	6
(Switzerland) Amra Sadiković	3	4
(Georgia (country)) Oksana Kalashnikova	4	1
10	(United States) Victoria Duval	6	6

Qualifying competition
1	(Russia) Anna Blinkova	6	6
10	(United States) Victoria Duval	1	4

==== Second qualifier ====
First round
2	(Germany) Antonia Lottner	2	7	7
WC	(Poland) Urszula Radwańska	6	5	5
WC	(Netherlands) Kelly Versteeg	3	0
9	(Mexico) Renata Zarazúa	6	6

Qualifying competition
2	(Germany) Antonia Lottner	6	6
9	(Mexico) Renata Zarazúa	3	3

==== Third qualifier ====
First round
3	(Czech Republic) Tereza Martincová	7^{7}	6
(Sweden) Cornelia Lister	6^{2}	4
(Belarus) Lidziya Marozava	3	6	6^{5}
12	(Russia) Marina Melnikova	6	2	7^{7}

Qualifying competition
3	(Czech Republic) Tereza Martincová	6^{2}	2
12	(Russia) Marina Melnikova	7^{7}	6

==== Fourth qualifier ====
First round
4	(Hungary) Fanny Stollár	6	6
WC	(Netherlands) Demi Schuurs	3	3
WC	(Netherlands) Rosalie van der Hoek	3	2
8	(Netherlands) Lesley Kerkhove	6	6

Qualifying competition
4	(Hungary) Fanny Stollár	6	6
8	(Netherlands) Lesley Kerkhove	3	2

==== Fifth qualifier ====
First round
5	(Russia) Veronika Kudermetova	6	7
(Croatia) Darija Jurak	2	5
(Belarus) Sviatlana Pirazhenka	7^{7}	6
11	(Australia) Ellen Perez	6^{4}	4

Qualifying competition
5	(Russia) Veronika Kudermetova	6	6
(Belarus) Sviatlana Pirazhenka	2	3

==== Sixth qualifier ====
First round
6	(Greece) Valentini Grammatikopoulou	6	6
WC	(Netherlands) Dewi Dijkman	3	1
(Poland) Katarzyna Piter	6	6
7	(Austria) Barbara Haas	3	4

Qualifying competition
6	(Greece) Valentini Grammatikopoulou	6	6
(Poland) Katarzyna Piter	4	4
