= Southsea Trophy =

Fuzion 100 Southsea Trophy

ITF Women's Tour
- Event name: Southsea
- Location: Southsea, United Kingdom
- Venue: Canoe Lake
- Category: ITF $100,000+H
- Surface: Grass
- Draw: 16S/8D
- Prize money: $100,000+H
- Website: www.lta.org.uk

The Fuzion 100 Southsea Trophy, previously named the Aegon Southsea Trophy, was a tennis tournament held on outdoor grass courts at Canoe Lake in Southsea, United Kingdom. It was held from 2017 to 2018 and was part of the ITF Women's Circuit as a $100,000+H event.

== Past finals ==
=== Singles ===
Year	Champion	Runner-up	Score
2018	(Belgium) Kirsten Flipkens	(United Kingdom) Katie Boulter	6–4, 5–7, 6–3
2017	(Germany) Tatjana Maria	(Romania) Irina-Camelia Begu	6–2, 6–2

=== Doubles ===
Year	Champions	Runners-up	Score
2018	(Belgium) Kirsten Flipkens (Sweden) Johanna Larsson	(Poland) Alicja Rosolska (United States) Abigail Spears	6–4, 3–6, [11–9]
2017	(Japan) Shuko Aoyama (China) Yang Zhaoxuan	(Switzerland) Viktorija Golubic (Ukraine) Lyudmyla Kichenok	6–7^{(7–9)}, 6–3, [10–8]
