= 2021 Miami Open =

- Date: March 23 – April 4
- Edition: 36th
- Category: Masters 1000 (ATP); WTA 1000 (WTA)
- Draw: 96S / 48Q / 32D
- Prize money: $4,299,205 (ATP) $3,260,190 (WTA)
- Surface: Hard - outdoor
- Location: Miami Gardens, Florida, United States
- Venue: Hard Rock Stadium

Champions

Men's singles
- (Poland) Hubert Hurkacz

Women's singles
- (Australia) Ashleigh Barty

Men's doubles
- (Croatia) Nikola Mektić / (Croatia) Mate Pavić

Women's doubles
- (Japan) Shuko Aoyama / (Japan) Ena Shibahara
- Miami Open

The 2021 Miami Open was a professional hardcourt tennis tournament played from March 23 to April 4, 2021, on the grounds of Hard Rock Stadium in Miami Gardens, Florida in the United States. The 36th edition of the Miami Open, it was a Masters 1000 event on the 2021 ATP Tour, and a WTA 1000 event on the 2021 WTA Tour. The 2020 edition was postponed due to the onset of the COVID-19 pandemic in Florida.

Due to COVID-19 restrictions, capacity for each session was limited to 800–1,000 spectators, and spectators were only admitted in the three largest courts on the site; Hard Rock Stadium itself was not used. Roger Federer and Ashleigh Barty were the defending champions from 2019 in the men's and women's singles respectively. Barty successfully defended her title, defeating Bianca Andreescu in the final, 6–3, 4–0, retired. Federer did not attend the tournament.

== Finals ==
=== Men's singles ===
- (Poland) Hubert Hurkacz defeated (Italy) Jannik Sinner 7–6^{(7–4)}, 6–4.

=== Women's singles ===
- (Australia) Ashleigh Barty defeated (Canada) Bianca Andreescu 6–3, 4–0 ret.

=== Men's doubles ===
- (Croatia) Nikola Mektić / (Croatia) Mate Pavić defeated (United Kingdom) Dan Evans / (United Kingdom) Neal Skupski 6–4, 6–4.

=== Women's doubles ===
- (Japan) Shuko Aoyama / (Japan) Ena Shibahara defeated (United States) Hayley Carter / (Brazil) Luisa Stefani, 6–2, 7–5.

== Points and prize money ==
=== Point distribution ===
Event	W	F	SF	QF	Round of 16	Round of 32	Round of 64	Round of 128	Q	Q2	Q1
Men's singles	1000	600	360	180	90	45	25*	10	16	8	0
Men's doubles	1000	600	360	180	90	0	—N/a	—N/a	—N/a	—N/a	—N/a
Women's singles	1000	650	390	215	120	65	35*	10	30	20	2
Women's Doubles	1000	650	390	215	120	10	—N/a	—N/a	—N/a	—N/a	—N/a

* Players with byes receive first round points.

=== Prize money ===
Event	W	F	SF	QF	Round of 16	Round of 32	Round of 64	Round of 128	Q2	Q1
Men's singles	$300,110	$165,000	$93,000	$61,000	$40,000	$26,000	$16,000	$10,000	$5,890	$3,100
Women's singles	$300,110	$165,000	$93,000	$61,000	$40,000	$26,000	$16,000	$10,000	$5,890	$3,100
Men's doubles	$81,000	$51,000	$38,000	$27,000	$18,000	$12,000	—N/a	—N/a	—N/a	—N/a
Women's doubles	$81,000	$51,000	$38,000	$27,000	$18,000	$12,000	—N/a	—N/a	—N/a	—N/a

== ATP singles main-draw entrants ==
The following are the seeded players. Seedings and ranking points based on ATP rankings as of March 22, 2021.

Seed	Rank	Player	Points before	Points defending (Note: Tournaments dated March 4 to August 5, 2019 during the 2019 season are dropped their defending points in each tournament divided by 50 percent.)	Points won	Points after	Status
1	2	(Russia) Daniil Medvedev	9,940	90	180	10,030	Quarterfinals lost to (Spain) Roberto Bautista Agut [7]
2	5	(Greece) Stefanos Tsitsipas	6,950	90	180	7,040	Quarterfinals lost to (Poland) Hubert Hurkacz [26]
3	7	(Germany) Alexander Zverev	6,070	10	10	6,070	Second round lost to (Finland) Emil Ruusuvuori
4	8	(Russia) Andrey Rublev	5,101	61	360	5,400	Semifinals lost to (Poland) Hubert Hurkacz [26]
5	9	(Argentina) Diego Schwartzman	3,640	10	90	3,720	Fourth round lost to (United States) Sebastian Korda
6	11	(Canada) Denis Shapovalov	3,000	360	45	2,820	Third round lost to (Poland) Hubert Hurkacz [26]
7	12	(Spain) Roberto Bautista Agut	2,910	180	360	3,090	Semifinals lost to (Italy) Jannik Sinner [21]
8	13	(Belgium) David Goffin	2,795	90	10	2,750	Second round lost to (Australia) James Duckworth
9	16	(Bulgaria) Grigor Dimitrov	2,620	45	10	2,598	Second round lost to (United Kingdom) Cameron Norrie
10	17	(Italy) Fabio Fognini	2,570	45	10	2,548	Second round lost to (United States) Sebastian Korda
11	18	(Canada) Félix Auger-Aliassime	2,561	376	45	2,373	Third round lost to (United States) John Isner [18]
12	19	(Canada) Milos Raonic	2,450	45	90	2,495	Fourth round lost to (Poland) Hubert Hurkacz [26]
13	20	(Chile) Cristian Garín	2,385	0	10	2,385	Second round lost to (Croatia) Marin Čilić
14	22	(Russia) Karen Khachanov	2,200	10	45	2,280	Third round lost to (Italy) Jannik Sinner [21]
15	23	(Australia) Alex de Minaur	2,190	0	10	2,200	Second round lost to (Colombia) Daniel Elahi Galán
16	26	(Serbia) Dušan Lajović	1,895	45	45	1,895	Third round lost to (United States) Frances Tiafoe
17	27	(Russia) Aslan Karatsev	1,888	(15)^{†}	45	1,918	Third round lost to (United States) Sebastian Korda
18	28	(United States) John Isner	1,850	600	90	1,340	Fourth round lost to (Spain) Roberto Bautista Agut [7]
19	29	(United Kingdom) Daniel Evans	1,813	25	10	1,797	Second round lost to (United States) Frances Tiafoe
20	30	(France) Ugo Humbert	1,790	10	45	1,825	Third round lost to (Canada) Milos Raonic [12]
21	31	(Italy) Jannik Sinner	1,789	(20)^{‡}	600	2,369	Runner-up, lost to (Poland) Hubert Hurkacz [26]
22	32	(United States) Taylor Fritz	1,775	10	90	1,855	Fourth round lost to (Kazakhstan) Alexander Bublik [32]
23	33	(France) Benoît Paire	1,773	(48)^{н}	10	1,749	Second round lost to (Italy) Lorenzo Musetti
24	34	(Italy) Lorenzo Sonego	1,668	25	90	1,733	Fourth round lost to. (Greece) Stefanos Tsitsipas [2]
25	36	(France) Adrian Mannarino	1,661	25	45	1,681	Third round lost to (Argentina) Diego Schwartzman [5]
26	37	(Poland) Hubert Hurkacz	1,645	45	1,000	2,600	Champion, defeated (Italy) Jannik Sinner [21]
27	38	(Georgia (country)) Nikoloz Basilashvili	1,645	90	10	1,600	Second round lost to (Sweden) Mikael Ymer
28	39	(Japan) Kei Nishikori	1,513	10	45	1,548	Third round lost to (Greece) Stefanos Tsitsipas [2]
29	40	(Hungary) Márton Fucsovics	1,462	10	45	1,497	Third round lost to (Russia) Andrey Rublev [4]
30	41	(United States) Reilly Opelka	1,457	61	10	1,427	Second round lost to (Australia) Alexei Popyrin
31	42	(Germany) Jan-Lennard Struff	1,450	10	45	1,485	Third round lost to (Spain) Roberto Bautista Agut [7]
32	44	(Kazakhstan) Alexander Bublik	1,385	41	180	1,462	Quarterfinals lost to (Italy) Jannik Sinner [21]

† The player did not qualify for the tournament in 2019. Accordingly, this was his points from the ATP Challenger Tour.
‡ The player did not qualify for the tournament in 2019. Accordingly, this was his 18th best result deducted instead.
н The player used an exemption after the completion of the tournament in 2019. Accordingly, this was his points from the ATP Challenger Tour.

=== Other entrants ===
The following players received wildcards into the singles main draw:

- (Spain) Carlos Alcaraz
- (United Kingdom) Jack Draper
- (France) Hugo Gaston
- (United States) Michael Mmoh
- ~~(United Kingdom) Andy Murray~~

The following players received entry using a protected ranking into the singles main draw:

- (South Africa) Kevin Anderson
- (Chinese Taipei) Lu Yen-hsun

The following players received entry from the qualifying draw:

- (United Kingdom) Liam Broady
- (United States) Ernesto Escobedo
- (Italy) Thomas Fabbiano
- (United States) Bjorn Fratangelo
- (Australia) Thanasi Kokkinakis
- (Italy) Paolo Lorenzi
- (United States) Mackenzie McDonald
- (Japan) Shintaro Mochizuki
- (United States) Emilio Nava
- (Brazil) Thiago Seyboth Wild
- (Chile) Alejandro Tabilo
- (Germany) Mischa Zverev

The following players received entry as a lucky losers:

- (Bosnia and Herzegovina) Damir Džumhur
- (Italy) Federico Gaio

=== Withdrawals ===
Before the tournament

- (Spain) Pablo Andújar → replaced by (Argentina) Federico Coria
- (Spain) Pablo Carreño Busta → replaced by (Portugal) João Sousa
- (Italy) Matteo Berrettini → replaced by (United States) Denis Kudla
- (Croatia) Borna Ćorić → replaced by (Germany) Yannick Hanfmann
- (Uruguay) Pablo Cuevas → replaced by (Spain) Pedro Martínez
- (Spain) Alejandro Davidovich Fokina → replaced by (Sweden) Mikael Ymer
- (Serbia) Novak Djokovic → replaced by (Australia) Alexei Popyrin
- (United Kingdom) Kyle Edmund → replaced by (Australia) James Duckworth
- (Switzerland) Roger Federer → replaced by (United States) Marcos Giron
- (France) Richard Gasquet → replaced by (Japan) Yasutaka Uchiyama
- (Serbia) Filip Krajinović → replaced by (Belarus) Ilya Ivashka
- (Australia) Nick Kyrgios → replaced by (Finland) Emil Ruusuvuori
- (Australia) John Millman → replaced by (Italy) Lorenzo Musetti
- (France) Gaël Monfils → replaced by (France) Pierre-Hugues Herbert
- (Brazil) Thiago Monteiro → replaced by (Bosnia and Herzegovina) Damir Džumhur
- (France) Corentin Moutet → replaced by (Kazakhstan) Mikhail Kukushkin
- (United Kingdom) Andy Murray → replaced by (Italy) Federico Gaio
- (Spain) Rafael Nadal → replaced by (Portugal) Pedro Sousa
- (Argentina) Guido Pella → replaced by (South Africa) Lloyd Harris
- (Spain) Albert Ramos Viñolas → replaced by (Colombia) Daniel Elahi Galán
- (Norway) Casper Ruud → replaced by (Australia) Christopher O'Connell
- (France) Gilles Simon → replaced by (South Korea) Kwon Soon-woo
- (Austria) Dominic Thiem → replaced by (Argentina) Federico Delbonis
- (France) Jo-Wilfried Tsonga → replaced by (United States) Sebastian Korda
- (Switzerland) Stan Wawrinka → replaced by (United States) Steve Johnson

During the tournament

- (South Africa) Lloyd Harris

=== Retirements ===
- (United Kingdom) Jack Draper
- (Spain) Pedro Martínez

== ATP doubles main-draw entrants ==
=== Seeds ===
Country	Player	Country	Player	Rank^{1}	Seed
COL	Juan Sebastián Cabal	COL	Robert Farah	3	1
CRO	Nikola Mektić	CRO	Mate Pavić	8	2
CRO	Ivan Dodig	SVK	Filip Polášek	19	3
ESP	Marcel Granollers	ARG	Horacio Zeballos	21	4
NED	Wesley Koolhof	POL	Łukasz Kubot	21	5
GBR	Jamie Murray	BRA	Bruno Soares	23	6
USA	Rajeev Ram	GBR	Joe Salisbury	26	7
FRA	Pierre-Hugues Herbert	FRA	Nicolas Mahut	29	8

- ^{1} Rankings as of March 15, 2021.

=== Other entrants ===
The following pairs received wildcards into the doubles main draw:

- (United States) Steve Johnson / (United States) Sam Querrey
- (United States) Sebastian Korda / (United States) Michael Mmoh
- (United States) Nicholas Monroe / (United States) Frances Tiafoe

The following pair received entry as an alternate:

- (Brazil) Marcelo Demoliner / (Mexico) Santiago González

=== Withdrawals ===
Before the tournament

- (Australia) Alex de Minaur / (Australia) John Millman → replaced by (Serbia) Miomir Kecmanović / (Pakistan) Aisam-ul-Haq Qureshi
- (Bulgaria) Grigor Dimitrov / (Japan) Kei Nishikori → replaced by (Brazil) Marcelo Demoliner / (Mexico) Santiago González

During the tournament

- (Russia) Karen Khachanov / (Russia) Andrey Rublev

== WTA singles main-draw entrants ==
=== Seeds ===
The following are the seeded players. Seedings are based on WTA rankings as of March 15, 2021. Rankings and points before are as of March 22, 2021.

Seed	Rank	Player	Points before	Points defending^{^}	Points won^{¡}	Points after	Status
1	1	(Australia) Ashleigh Barty	9,186	1,000	1,000	9,186	Champion, defeated (Canada) Bianca Andreescu [8]
2	2	(Japan) Naomi Osaka	7,835	65	215	7,985	Quarterfinals lost to (Greece) Maria Sakkari [23]
3	3	(Romania) Simona Halep	7,255	390	(65) 100	6,965	Third round withdrew due to shoulder injury
4	4	(United States) Sofia Kenin	5,760	10 + 35	(65) 100 + 100	5,915	Third round lost to (Tunisia) Ons Jabeur [27]
5	5	(Ukraine) Elina Svitolina	5,370	10	390	5,750	Semifinals lost to (Australia) Ashleigh Barty [1]
6	6	(Czech Republic) Karolína Plíšková	5,205	650	(65) 105	4,660	Third round lost to (United States) Jessica Pegula [29]
7	8	(Belarus) Aryna Sabalenka	4,815	10 + 120	215 + 185	5,085	Quarterfinals lost to (Australia) Ashleigh Barty [1]
8	9	(Canada) Bianca Andreescu	4,735	120	650	5,265	Runner-up, lost to (Australia) Ashleigh Barty [1]
9	10	(Czech Republic) Petra Kvitová	4,571	215	120	4,476	Fourth round lost to (Ukraine) Elina Svitolina [5]
10	11	(Netherlands) Kiki Bertens	4,505	120	(10) 105	4,490	Second round lost to (Russia) Liudmila Samsonova [Q]
11	12	(Switzerland) Belinda Bencic	4,260	10	65	4,315	Third round lost to (Czech Republic) Markéta Vondroušová [19]
12	13	(Spain) Garbiñe Muguruza	4,235	10 + 280	120 + 55	4,120	Fourth round lost to (Canada) Bianca Andreescu [8]
13	14	(United States) Jennifer Brady	3,765	(2)	(10)	3,765	Second round lost to (Spain) Sara Sorribes Tormo
14	15	(Belarus) Victoria Azarenka	3,665	35 + 180	120 + 55	3,625	Fourth round lost to (Australia) Ashleigh Barty [1]
15	16	(Poland) Iga Świątek	3,570	20	65	3,615	Third round lost to (Croatia) Ana Konjuh [WC]
16	17	(Belgium) Elise Mertens	3,310	65 + 65	120 + 100	3,400	Fourth round lost to (Japan) Naomi Osaka [2]
17	18	(United Kingdom) Johanna Konta	3,206	35	65	3,236	Third round lost to (Czech Republic) Petra Kvitová [9]
18	19	(United States) Madison Keys	3,075	10 + 470	10 + 1	2,606	Second round lost to (Croatia) Ana Konjuh [WC]
19	20	(Czech Republic) Markéta Vondroušová	2,957	215	120	2,862	Fourth round lost to (Belarus) Aryna Sabalenka [7]
20	21	(Croatia) Petra Martić	2,850	35 + 185 + 10	(10) 60 + 55 + 55	2,790	Second round lost to (Russia) Anna Kalinskaya [WC]
21	23	(Kazakhstan) Elena Rybakina	2,718	(100)^{†}	(65) 100	2,718	Third round lost to (Spain) Sara Sorribes Tormo
22	24	(Estonia) Anett Kontaveit	2,620	390	65	2,295	Third round lost to (Belgium) Elise Mertens [16]
23	25	(Greece) Maria Sakkari	2,570	35 + 10	390 + 105	3,020	Semifinals lost to (Canada) Bianca Andreescu [8]
24	26	(Germany) Angelique Kerber	2,370	65 + 110	65 + 55	2,315	Third round lost to (Belarus) Victoria Azarenka [14]
25	27	(United States) Alison Riske	2,256	35	(0) 1	2,222	Withdrew due to left foot injury
26	28	(Kazakhstan) Yulia Putintseva	2,015	120 + 35	(10) 55 + 55	1,970	Second round lost to (Serbia) Nina Stojanović [Q]
27	30	(Tunisia) Ons Jabeur	1,965	35 + 10	120 + 48	2,088	Fourth round lost to (Spain) Sara Sorribes Tormo
28	32	(United States) Amanda Anisimova	1,905	35 + 35	65 + 60	1,960	Third round lost to (Canada) Bianca Andreescu [8]
29	33	(United States) Jessica Pegula	1,904	30 + 55	120 + 29	1,968	Fourth round lost to (Greece) Maria Sakkari [23]
30	34	(Russia) Ekaterina Alexandrova	1,900	10	65	1,955	Third round lost to (Ukraine) Elina Svitolina [5]
31	36	(United States) Coco Gauff	1,821	35	10	1,796	Second round lost to (Latvia) Anastasija Sevastova
32	37	(Russia) Veronika Kudermetova	1,820	(2) 160	(65) 80	1,740	Third round lost to (Belarus) Aryna Sabalenka [7]

^ Points form 2019 Miami, 2019 Guadalajara, 2019 Charleston and 2019 Monterrey will be dropped on Monday, April 5; 2019 Indian Wells will not be mandatory anymore

¡ Miami will not be considered a mandatory result that must be counted as part of a player's best 16 results

† The player did not qualify for the tournament in 2019. Accordingly, this was her 16th best result deducted instead.

=== Other entrants ===
The following players received wildcards into the singles main draw:

- (Russia) Anna Kalinskaya
- (Croatia) Ana Konjuh
- (United States) Robin Montgomery
- (Australia) Storm Sanders
- (United States) Katrina Scott
- (Egypt) Mayar Sherif
- (China) Wang Xinyu
- (China) Wang Xiyu

The following player received entry using a protected ranking into the singles main draw:

- (United Kingdom) Katie Boulter
- (Germany) Andrea Petkovic
- (Russia) Anastasia Potapova
- (Kazakhstan) Yaroslava Shvedova

The following players received entry from the qualifying draw:

- (United States) Hailey Baptiste
- (Spain) Aliona Bolsova
- (Romania) Mihaela Buzărnescu
- (Italy) Elisabetta Cocciaretto
- (Serbia) Olga Danilović
- (France) Océane Dodin
- (Slovakia) Kristína Kučová
- (Czech Republic) Tereza Martincová
- (Bulgaria) Tsvetana Pironkova
- (Russia) Liudmila Samsonova
- (Serbia) Nina Stojanović
- (Mexico) Renata Zarazúa

The following player received entry as a lucky loser:

- (Belgium) Kirsten Flipkens

=== Withdrawals ===
Before the tournament

- (Slovenia) Polona Hercog → replaced by (Germany) Andrea Petkovic
- (Chinese Taipei) Hsieh Su-wei → replaced by (Russia) Anastasia Potapova
- (Russia) Daria Kasatkina → replaced by (Kazakhstan) Zarina Diyas
- (United States) Ann Li → replaced by (United Kingdom) Katie Boulter
- (Czech Republic) Karolína Muchová → replaced by (Italy) Camila Giorgi
- (Russia) Anastasia Pavlyuchenkova → replaced by (United States) Lauren Davis
- (United States) Alison Riske → replaced by (Belgium) Kirsten Flipkens
- (Czech Republic) Barbora Strýcová → replaced by (Ukraine) Marta Kostyuk
- (Romania) Patricia Maria Țig → replaced by (United States) Madison Brengle
- (Belgium) Alison Van Uytvanck → replaced by (Japan) Nao Hibino
- (Croatia) Donna Vekić → replaced by (Netherlands) Arantxa Rus
- (United States) Serena Williams → replaced by (United States) Christina McHale
- (Ukraine) Dayana Yastremska (provisional suspension) → replaced by (United States) Venus Williams

During the tournament

- (Romania) Simona Halep
- (Germany) Laura Siegemund
- (Serbia) Nina Stojanović

=== Retirements ===
- (Canada) Bianca Andreescu
- (Switzerland) Jil Teichmann

== WTA doubles main-draw entrants ==
=== Seeds ===
Country	Player	Country	Player	Rank^{1}	Seed
BEL	Elise Mertens	BLR	Aryna Sabalenka	3	1
CZE	Barbora Krejčíková	CZE	Kateřina Siniaková	15	2
USA	Nicole Melichar	NED	Demi Schuurs	23	3
HUN	Tímea Babos	RUS	Veronika Kudermetova	30	4
JPN	Shuko Aoyama	JPN	Ena Shibahara	30	5
CHN	Xu Yifan	CHN	Zhang Shuai	39	6
CHI	Alexa Guarachi	USA	Desirae Krawczyk	39	7
USA	Hayley Carter	BRA	Luisa Stefani	63	8

- ^{1} Rankings as of March 15, 2021.

=== Other entrants ===
The following pairs received wildcards into the doubles main draw:

- (United States) Hailey Baptiste / (United States) Robin Montgomery
- (Netherlands) Kiki Bertens / (Netherlands) Arantxa Rus
- (Australia) Ajla Tomljanović / (United Kingdom) Heather Watson

The following pairs received entry using a protected ranking into the doubles main draw:

- (United States) Kaitlyn Christian / (Russia) Alla Kudryavtseva
- (Belgium) Kirsten Flipkens / (United States) CoCo Vandeweghe
- (United States) Vania King / (Kazakhstan) Yaroslava Shvedova

The following pairs received entry as an alternate:

- (Russia) Ekaterina Alexandrova / (China) Zhaoxuan Yang
- (France) Caroline Garcia / (Argentina) Nadia Podoroska
- (Croatia) Petra Martić / (United States) Shelby Rogers
- (United States) Asia Muhammad / (United States) Jessica Pegula

=== Withdrawals ===
Before the tournament

- (Australia) Ashleigh Barty / (United States) Jennifer Brady → replaced by (France) Caroline Garcia / (Argentina) Nadia Podoroska
- (Switzerland) Belinda Bencic / (Switzerland) Jil Teichmann → replaced by (Croatia) Petra Martić / (United States) Shelby Rogers
- (Russia) Anna Kalinskaya / (Slovakia) Viktória Kužmová → replaced by (Russia) Ekaterina Alexandrova / (China) Zhaoxuan Yang
- (Germany) Laura Siegemund / (Russia) Vera Zvonareva → replaced by (United States) Asia Muhammad / (United States) Jessica Pegula

During the tournament

- (Romania) Simona Halep / (Germany) Angelique Kerber
- (Croatia) Darija Jurak / (Serbia) Nina Stojanović
