= 2019 Miami Open =

- Date: March 18–31
- Edition: 35th
- Category: Masters 1000 (ATP); Premier Mandatory (WTA)
- Draw: 96S / 48Q / 32D
- Prize money: $9,035,428 (ATP) $9,035,428 (WTA)
- Surface: Hard - outdoor
- Location: Miami Gardens, Florida, United States
- Venue: Hard Rock Stadium

Champions

Men's singles
- (Switzerland) Roger Federer

Women's singles
- (Australia) Ashleigh Barty

Men's doubles
- (United States) Bob Bryan / (United States) Mike Bryan

Women's doubles
- (Belgium) Elise Mertens / (Belarus) Aryna Sabalenka
← 2018 ·	Miami Open	· 2021 →

The 2019 Miami Open (sponsored by Itaú) was a professional men and women's tennis tournament played on outdoor hard courts that started on March 18, 2019, and ended on March 31, 2019. It was the 35th edition of the Miami Open, and part of the Masters 1000 category on the 2019 ATP Tour, and of the Premier Mandatory category on the 2019 WTA Tour. This was the first time the tournament took place at the Hard Rock Stadium in Miami Gardens, Florida, United States.

== Finals ==
=== Men's singles ===
- (Switzerland) Roger Federer defeated (United States) John Isner, 6–1, 6–4

=== Women's singles ===
- (Australia) Ashleigh Barty defeated (Czech Republic) Karolína Plíšková, 7–6^{(7–1)}, 6–3

=== Men's doubles ===
- (United States) Bob Bryan / (United States) Mike Bryan defeated (Netherlands) Wesley Koolhof / (Greece) Stefanos Tsitsipas, 7–5, 7–6^{(10–8)}

=== Women's doubles ===
- (Belgium) Elise Mertens / (Belarus) Aryna Sabalenka defeated (Australia) Samantha Stosur / (China) Zhang Shuai, 7–6^{(7–5)}, 6–2

== Points and prize money ==
=== Point distribution ===
Event	W	F	SF	QF	Round of 16	Round of 32	Round of 64	Round of 128	Q	Q2	Q1
Men's singles	1000	600	360	180	90	45	25*	10	16	8	0
Men's doubles	1000	600	360	180	90	0	—	—	—	—	—
Women's singles	1000	650	390	215	120	65	35*	10	30	20	2
Women's Doubles	1000	650	390	215	120	10	—	—	—	—	—

* Players with byes receive first round points.

=== Prize money ===
Event	W	F	SF	QF	Round of 16	Round of 32	Round of 64	Round of 128	Q2	Q1
Men's singles	$1,354,010	$686,000	$354,000	$182,000	$91,205	$48,775	$26,430	$16,425	$6,790	$3,395
Women's singles	$1,354,010	$686,000	$354,000	$182,000	$91,205	$48,775	$26,430	$16,425	$6,790	$3,395
Men's doubles	$457,290	$223,170	$111,170	$57,000	$30,060	$16,090	—	—	—	—
Women's doubles	$457,290	$223,170	$111,170	$57,000	$30,060	$16,090	—	—	—	—

== ATP singles main-draw entrants ==
=== Seeds ===
The following are the seeded players. Rankings and seedings are based on ATP rankings as of March 18, 2019.

Seed	Rank	Player	Points before	Points defending	Points won	Points after	Status
1	1	(Serbia) Novak Djokovic	10,990	10	90	11,070	Fourth round lost to (Spain) Roberto Bautista Agut [22]
2	3	(Germany) Alexander Zverev	6,630	600	10	6,040	Second round lost to (Spain) David Ferrer [WC]
3	4	(Austria) Dominic Thiem	4,755	0	10	4,765	Second round lost to (Poland) Hubert Hurkacz
4	5	(Switzerland) Roger Federer	4,600	10	1000	5,590	Champion, defeated (United States) John Isner [7]
5	6	(Japan) Kei Nishikori	4,235	45	10	4,200	Second round lost to (Serbia) Dušan Lajović
6	7	(South Africa) Kevin Anderson	4,115	180	180	4,115	Quarterfinals lost to (Switzerland) Roger Federer [4]
7	9	(United States) John Isner	3,485	1,000	600	3,085	Runner-up, lost to (Switzerland) Roger Federer [4]
8	10	(Greece) Stefanos Tsitsipas	3,160	10	90	3,240	Fourth round lost to (Canada) Denis Shapovalov [20]
9	11	(Croatia) Marin Čilić	3,095	90	10	3,015	Second round lost to (Russia) Andrey Rublev [Q]
10	12	(Russia) Karen Khachanov	2,845	45	10	2,810	Second round lost to (Australia) Jordan Thompson
11	13	(Croatia) Borna Ćorić	2,345	180	180	2,345	Quarterfinals lost to (Canada) Félix Auger-Aliassime [Q]
12	14	(Canada) Milos Raonic	2,275	180	45	2,140	Third round lost to (United Kingdom) Kyle Edmund [19]
13	15	(Russia) Daniil Medvedev	2,230	25	90	2,295	Fourth round lost to (Switzerland) Roger Federer [4]
14	16	(Italy) Marco Cecchinato	2,021	(45)^{†}	45	2,021	Third round lost to (Belgium) David Goffin [18]
15	17	(Italy) Fabio Fognini	1,885	45	45	1,885	Third round lost to (Spain) Roberto Bautista Agut [22]
~~16~~	~~18~~	~~(France) Gaël Monfils~~	1,875	0	0	1,875	Withdrew due to left Achilles tendon injury
17	19	(Georgia (country)) Nikoloz Basilashvili	1,865	25	90	1,930	Fourth round lost to (Canada) Félix Auger-Aliassime [Q]
18	20	(Belgium) David Goffin	1,685	10	90	1,765	Fourth round lost to (United States) Frances Tiafoe [28]
19	22	(United Kingdom) Kyle Edmund	1,600	10	90	1,680	Fourth round lost to (United States) John Isner [7]
20	23	(Canada) Denis Shapovalov	1,550	90	360	1,820	Semifinals vs. (Switzerland) Roger Federer [4]
21	24	(Argentina) Diego Schwartzman	1,520	45	10	1,485	Second round lost to (United States) Reilly Opelka [Q]
22	25	(Spain) Roberto Bautista Agut	1,510	10	180	1,680	Quarterfinals lost to (United States) John Isner [7]
23	27	(France) Gilles Simon	1,340	10	10	1,340	Second round lost to (France) Jérémy Chardy
24	29	(Bulgaria) Grigor Dimitrov	1,300	45	45	1,300	Third round lost to (Australia) Jordan Thompson
25	30	(France) Lucas Pouille	1,265	0	10	1,275	Second round lost to (Spain) Albert Ramos Viñolas
26	32	(Argentina) Guido Pella	1,240	10	10	1,240	Second round lost to (Argentina) Leonardo Mayer
27	33	(Australia) Nick Kyrgios	1,215	90	90	1,215	Fourth round lost to (Croatia) Borna Ćorić [11]
28	34	(United States) Frances Tiafoe	1,200	90	180	1,290	Quarterfinals lost to (Canada) Denis Shapovalov [20]
29	36	(Hungary) Márton Fucsovics	1,180	10	10	1,180	Second round lost to (Canada) Félix Auger-Aliassime [Q]
30	37	(Switzerland) Stan Wawrinka	1,175	0	10	1,185	Second round lost to (Serbia) Filip Krajinović
31	38	(United States) Steve Johnson	1,160	45	10	1,125	Second round lost to (Portugal) João Sousa
32	39	(Australia) John Millman	1,126	41	10	1,095	Second round lost to (Argentina) Federico Delbonis

† The player did not qualify for the tournament in 2018. Accordingly, points for his 18th best result are deducted instead.

=== Withdrawals ===
The following players would have been seeded, but they withdrew from the event.

Rank	Player	Points before	Points defending	Points after	Reason
2	(Spain) Rafael Nadal	8,725	0	8,725	Right knee injury
8	(Argentina) Juan Martín del Potro	3,585	360	3,225	Knee injury
21	(Spain) Pablo Carreño Busta	1,615	360	1,255	Shoulder injury
26	(Australia) Alex de Minaur	1,493	26	1,467	Illness
28	(France) Richard Gasquet	1,340	10	1,375^{†}	Groin injury
31	(Serbia) Laslo Đere	1,246	0	1,246^{‡}	
35	(Spain) Fernando Verdasco	1,200	90	1,155^{†}	Personal reasons (paternity leave)

† The player is entitled to use an exemption to skip the tournament and substitute his 18th best result (45 points in each case) in its stead.
‡ The player did not qualify for the main draw based on his ranking at the entry cutoff date and only withdrew from the alternates list. Accordingly, no points are deducted for the withdrawal.

=== Other entrants ===
The following players received wildcards into the singles main draw:

- (United States) Christopher Eubanks
- (Spain) David Ferrer
- (Serbia) Miomir Kecmanović
- (Spain) Nicola Kuhn
- (Chinese Taipei) Tseng Chun-hsin

The following player received entry using a protected ranking into the singles main draw:

- (Serbia) Janko Tipsarević

The following players received entry from the qualifying draw:

- (Moldova) Radu Albot
- (Canada) Félix Auger-Aliassime
- (Kazakhstan) Alexander Bublik
- (Uruguay) Pablo Cuevas
- (India) Prajnesh Gunneswaran
- (Slovakia) Lukáš Lacko
- (Brazil) Thiago Monteiro
- (United States) Reilly Opelka
- (Russia) Andrey Rublev
- (Norway) Casper Ruud
- (Italy) Lorenzo Sonego
- (Sweden) Mikael Ymer

The following players received entry as lucky losers:

- (United Kingdom) Dan Evans
- (South Africa) Lloyd Harris
- (United States) Mackenzie McDonald

=== Withdrawals ===
Before the tournament

- (Czech Republic) Tomáš Berdych → replaced by (United Kingdom) Dan Evans
- (Spain) Pablo Carreño Busta → replaced by (Latvia) Ernests Gulbis
- (South Korea) Chung Hyeon → replaced by (United States) Mackenzie McDonald
- (Australia) Alex de Minaur → replaced by (Spain) Jaume Munar
- (Argentina) Juan Martín del Potro → replaced by (Serbia) Janko Tipsarević
- (France) Richard Gasquet → replaced by (Belarus) Ilya Ivashka
- (Germany) Philipp Kohlschreiber → replaced by (Australia) Bernard Tomic
- (France) Gaël Monfils → replaced by (South Africa) Lloyd Harris
- (Spain) Rafael Nadal → replaced by (France) Ugo Humbert
- (Japan) Yoshihito Nishioka → replaced by (Italy) Thomas Fabbiano
- (Italy) Andreas Seppi → replaced by (Spain) Pablo Andújar
- (Spain) Fernando Verdasco → replaced by (United States) Bradley Klahn

During the tournament

- (Bosnia and Herzegovina) Damir Džumhur
- (Germany) Maximilian Marterer

=== Retirements ===
- (Australia) Matthew Ebden
- (Spain) Nicola Kuhn

== ATP doubles main-draw entrants ==
=== Seeds ===
Country	Player	Country	Player	Rank^{1}	Seed
POL	Łukasz Kubot	BRA	Marcelo Melo	12	1
GBR	Jamie Murray	BRA	Bruno Soares	17	2
USA	Bob Bryan	USA	Mike Bryan	19	3
COL	Juan Sebastián Cabal	COL	Robert Farah	20	4
AUT	Oliver Marach	CRO	Mate Pavić	25	5
RSA	Raven Klaasen	NZL	Michael Venus	28	6
ESP	Marcel Granollers	CRO	Nikola Mektić	31	7
FIN	Henri Kontinen	AUS	John Peers	33	8

- ^{1} Rankings as of March 18, 2019.

=== Other entrants ===
The following pairs received wildcards into the doubles main draw:

- (Brazil) Marcelo Demoliner / (Serbia) Miomir Kecmanović
- (United States) Taylor Fritz / (Australia) Nick Kyrgios
- (United States) Mackenzie McDonald / (United States) Reilly Opelka

== WTA singles main-draw entrants ==
=== Seeds ===
The following are the seeded players. Seedings are based on WTA rankings as of March 4, 2019. Rankings and points before are as of March 18, 2019.

Seed	Rank	Player	Points before	Points defending	Points won	Points after	Status
1	1	(Japan) Naomi Osaka	5,991	35	65	6,021	Third round lost to (Chinese Taipei) Hsieh Su-wei [27]
2	3	(Romania) Simona Halep	5,457	65	390	5,782	Semifinals lost to (Czech Republic) Karolína Plíšková [5]
3	2	(Czech Republic) Petra Kvitová	5,550	120	215	5,645	Quarterfinals lost to (Australia) Ashleigh Barty [12]
4	6	(United States) Sloane Stephens	5,222	1,000	65	4,287	Third round lost to (Germany) Tatjana Maria
5	7	(Czech Republic) Karolína Plíšková	5,145	215	650	5,580	Runner-up, lost to (Australia) Ashleigh Barty [12]
6	5	(Ukraine) Elina Svitolina	5,225	215	10	5,020	Second round lost to (China) Wang Yafan
7	8	(Netherlands) Kiki Bertens	4,995	65	120	5,050	Fourth round lost to (Australia) Ashleigh Barty [12]
8	4	(Germany) Angelique Kerber	5,315	215	65	5,165	Third round lost to (Canada) Bianca Andreescu
9	9	(Belarus) Aryna Sabalenka	3,620	35	10	3,595	Second round lost to (Australia) Ajla Tomljanović
10	10	(United States) Serena Williams	3,406	10	65	3,461	Third round withdrew due to knee injury
11	12	(Latvia) Anastasija Sevastova	3,270	65	65	3,270	Third round lost to (Kazakhstan) Yulia Putintseva
12	11	(Australia) Ashleigh Barty	3,395	120	1000	4,275	Champion, defeated (Czech Republic) Karolína Plíšková [5]
13	13	(Denmark) Caroline Wozniacki	3,007	10	120	3,117	Fourth round lost to (Chinese Taipei) Hsieh Su-wei [27]
14	22	(Russia) Daria Kasatkina	2,345	10	65	2,400	Third round lost to (United States) Venus Williams
15	15	(Germany) Julia Görges	2,780	10	65	2,835	Third round lost to (France) Caroline Garcia [19]
16	14	(Belgium) Elise Mertens	2,800	65	65	2,800	Third round lost to (Czech Republic) Markéta Vondroušová
17	16	(United States) Madison Keys	2,726	10	10	2,726	Second round lost to (Australia) Samantha Stosur
18	18	(China) Wang Qiang	2,607	10	215	2,812	Quarterfinals lost to (Romania) Simona Halep [2]
19	21	(France) Caroline Garcia	2,350	10	120	2,460	Fourth round lost to (Czech Republic) Petra Kvitová [3]
20	17	(Spain) Garbiñe Muguruza	2,635	120	10	2,525	Second round lost to (Romania) Monica Niculescu [Q]
21	19	(Estonia) Anett Kontaveit	2,465	10	390	2,845	Semifinals lost to (Australia) Ashleigh Barty [12]
22	23	(Latvia) Jeļena Ostapenko	2,251	650	10	1,611	Second round lost to (Czech Republic) Markéta Vondroušová
23	20	(Switzerland) Belinda Bencic	2,420	0	10	2,430	Second round lost to (Kazakhstan) Yulia Putintseva
24	29	(Spain) Carla Suárez Navarro	1,718	10	10	1,718	Second round lost to (United States) Venus Williams
25	26	(United States) Danielle Collins	1,851	420	65	1,496	Third round lost to (China) Wang Yafan
26	25	(Croatia) Donna Vekić	1,875	65	65	1,875	Third round lost to (Czech Republic) Petra Kvitová [3]
27	27	(Chinese Taipei) Hsieh Su-wei	1,810	65	215	1,960	Quarterfinals lost to (Estonia) Anett Kontaveit [21]
~~28~~	~~28~~	~~(Ukraine) Lesia Tsurenko~~	1,806	10	0	1,796	Withdrew due to right arm injury
29	31	(Italy) Camila Giorgi	1,705	10	10	1,705	Second round lost to (Germany) Tatjana Maria
30	32	(Romania) Mihaela Buzărnescu	1,650	10	10	1,650	Second round lost to (France) Alizé Cornet
31	33	(Russia) Anastasia Pavlyuchenkova	1,565	65	10	1,510	Second round lost to (Slovakia) Viktória Kužmová
32	34	(United States) Sofia Kenin	1,534	95	10	1,449	Second round lost to (Canada) Bianca Andreescu

=== Withdrawals ===
The following players would have been seeded, but they withdrew from the event.

Rank	Player	Points before	Points defending	Points after	Reason
30	(Russia) Maria Sharapova	1,706	0	1,706	Right shoulder injury

=== Other entrants ===
The following players received wildcards into the singles main draw:

- (Serbia) Olga Danilović
- (United States) Cori Gauff
- (United States) Caty McNally
- (Japan) Mari Osaka
- (United States) Whitney Osuigwe
- (Russia) Natalia Vikhlyantseva
- (China) Wang Xinyu
- (China) Wang Xiyu

The following player received entry using a protected ranking into the singles main draw:

- (Germany) Anna-Lena Friedsam

The following players received entry from the qualifying draw:

- (Japan) Misaki Doi
- (Switzerland) Viktorija Golubic
- (Japan) Nao Hibino
- (Slovenia) Dalila Jakupović
- (Estonia) Kaia Kanepi
- (Czech Republic) Karolína Muchová
- (Romania) Monica Niculescu
- (United States) Jessica Pegula
- (Germany) Laura Siegemund
- (United States) Taylor Townsend
- (United States) Sachia Vickery
- (Belgium) Yanina Wickmayer

The following players received entry as lucky losers:

- (Slovenia) Polona Hercog
- (Czech Republic) Kristýna Plíšková

=== Withdrawals ===
Before the tournament

- (Russia) Ekaterina Makarova → replaced by (Spain) Sara Sorribes Tormo
- (Russia) Maria Sharapova (right shoulder injury) → replaced by (Russia) Margarita Gasparyan
- (Ukraine) Lesia Tsurenko → replaced by (Slovenia) Polona Hercog
- (Belgium) Alison Van Uytvanck → replaced by (Czech Republic) Kristýna Plíšková

During the tournament

- (United States) Serena Williams (left knee injury)

=== Retirements ===
- (Canada) Bianca Andreescu (right shoulder injury)

== WTA doubles main-draw entrants ==
=== Seeds ===
Country	Player	Country	Player	Rank^{1}	Seed
CZE	Barbora Krejčíková	CZE	Kateřina Siniaková	3	1
HUN	Tímea Babos	FRA	Kristina Mladenovic	8	2
TPE	Hsieh Su-wei	CZE	Barbora Strýcová	20	3
USA	Nicole Melichar	CZE	Květa Peschke	22	4
CAN	Gabriela Dabrowski	CHN	Xu Yifan	30	5
AUS	Samantha Stosur	CHN	Zhang Shuai	35	6
SLO	Andreja Klepač	ESP	María José Martínez Sánchez	38	7
TPE	Chan Hao-ching	TPE	Latisha Chan	39	8

- ^{1} Rankings as of March 4, 2019.

=== Other entrants ===
The following pairs received wildcards into the doubles main draw:

- (United States) Amanda Anisimova / (United States) Alison Riske
- (Belarus) Victoria Azarenka / (Australia) Ashleigh Barty
- (United States) Lauren Davis / (United States) Christina McHale
