= 2021 Miami Open – Men's singles =

Men's singles
- 2021 Miami Open

Final
- Champion: (Poland) Hubert Hurkacz
- Runner-up: (Italy) Jannik Sinner
- Score: 7–6^{(7–4)}, 6–4

Details
- Draw: 96 (12 Q / 5 WC )
- Seeds: 32

Events
Singles	men	women
Doubles	men	women
← 2019 ·	Miami Open	· 2022 →

Hubert Hurkacz defeated Jannik Sinner in the final, 7–6^{(7–4)}, 6–4 to win the men's singles tennis title at the 2021 Miami Open. It was his first Masters 1000 singles title, and he became the first Pole to win a Masters 1000 singles title.

Roger Federer was the reigning champion from when the tournament was last held in 2019, but chose not to participate this year.

As both Novak Djokovic and Rafael Nadal also chose not to participate, this was the first Masters 1000 tournament since the 2004 Paris Masters without at least one member of the Big Three competing.

== Seeds ==
All seeds received a bye into the second round.

1. (Russia) Daniil Medvedev (quarterfinals)
2. (Greece) Stefanos Tsitsipas (quarterfinals)
3. (Germany) Alexander Zverev (second round)
4. (Russia) Andrey Rublev (semifinals)
5. (Argentina) Diego Schwartzman (fourth round)
6. (Canada) Denis Shapovalov (third round)
7. (Spain) Roberto Bautista Agut (semifinals)
8. (Belgium) David Goffin (second round)
9. (Bulgaria) Grigor Dimitrov (second round)
10. (Italy) Fabio Fognini (second round)
11. (Canada) Félix Auger-Aliassime (third round)
12. (Canada) Milos Raonic (fourth round)
13. (Chile) Cristian Garín (second round)
14. (Russia) Karen Khachanov (third round)
15. (Australia) Alex de Minaur (second round)
16. (Serbia) Dušan Lajović (third round)

17. (Russia) Aslan Karatsev (third round)
18. (United States) John Isner (fourth round)
19. (United Kingdom) Dan Evans (second round)
20. (France) Ugo Humbert (third round)
21. (Italy) Jannik Sinner (final)
22. (United States) Taylor Fritz (fourth round)
23. (France) Benoît Paire (second round)
24. (Italy) Lorenzo Sonego (fourth round)
25. (France) Adrian Mannarino (third round)
26. (Poland) Hubert Hurkacz (champion)
27. (Georgia (country)) Nikoloz Basilashvili (second round)
28. (Japan) Kei Nishikori (third round)
29. (Hungary) Márton Fucsovics (third round)
30. (United States) Reilly Opelka (second round)
31. (Germany) Jan-Lennard Struff (third round)
32. (Kazakhstan) Alexander Bublik (quarterfinals)

Click on the seed number of a player to go to their draw section.

== Draw ==
=== Key ===
- Q = Qualifier
- WC = Wild card
- LL = Lucky loser
- Alt = Alternate
- SE = Special exempt
- PR = Protected ranking
- ITF = ITF entry
- JE = Junior exempt
- w/o = Walkover
- r = Retired
- d = Defaulted
- SR = Special ranking

=== Finals ===
Quarterfinals
1	(Russia) Daniil Medvedev	4	2
7	(Spain) Roberto Bautista Agut	6	6
21	(Italy) Jannik Sinner	7^{7}	6
32	(Kazakhstan) Alexander Bublik	6^{5}	4
(United States) Sebastian Korda	5	6^{7}
4	(Russia) Andrey Rublev	7	7^{9}
26	(Poland) Hubert Hurkacz	2	6	6
2	(Greece) Stefanos Tsitsipas	6	3	4

Semifinals
7	(Spain) Roberto Bautista Agut	7	4	4
21	(Italy) Jannik Sinner	5	6	6
4	(Russia) Andrey Rublev	3	4
26	(Poland) Hubert Hurkacz	6	6

Final
21	(Italy) Jannik Sinner	6^{4}	4
26	(Poland) Hubert Hurkacz	7^{7}	6

=== Top half ===
==== Section 1 ====
First round
(United States) S Querrey	3	4
PR	(Chinese Taipei) Y-h Lu	6	6
(Spain) F López	4	6^{4}
(Australia) A Popyrin	6	7^{7}
(United States) F Tiafoe	5	6	6
(Italy) S Travaglia	7	4	2
Q	(United States) E Escobedo	6	6
Q	(Italy) P Lorenzi	3	2

Second round
1	(Russia) D Medvedev	6	6
PR	(Chinese Taipei) Y-h Lu	2	2
(Australia) A Popyrin	6	6
30	(United States) R Opelka	4	2
19	(United Kingdom) D Evans	7^{7}	3	3
(United States) F Tiafoe	6^{5}	6	6
Q	(United States) E Escobedo	2	3
16	(Serbia) D Lajović	6	6

Third round
1	(Russia) D Medvedev	7^{7}	6^{7}	6
(Australia) A Popyrin	6^{3}	7^{9}	4
(United States) F Tiafoe	1	7	6
16	(Serbia) D Lajović	6	5	3

Fourth round
1	(Russia) D Medvedev	6	6
(United States) F Tiafoe	4	3

==== Section 2 ====
First round
(France) P-H Herbert	6	6
(Portugal) P Sousa	1	3
(Canada) V Pospisil	3	6	3
Q	(United States) M McDonald	6	4	6
LL	(Italy) F Gaio	6^{4}	2
(Lithuania) R Berankis	7^{7}	6
(South Africa) L Harris	6	7^{9}
Q	(United States) E Nava	4	6^{7}

Second round
11	(Canada) F Auger-Aliassime	6	6
(France) P-H Herbert	4	4
Q	(United States) M McDonald	6	3	5
18	(United States) J Isner	2	6	7
31	(Germany) J-L Struff	6	6
(Lithuania) R Berankis	3	4
(South Africa) L Harris
7	(Spain) R Bautista Agut	w/o

Third round
11	(Canada) F Auger-Aliassime	6^{5}	6^{5}
18	(United States) J Isner	7^{7}	7^{7}
31	(Germany) J-L Struff	6	3	2
7	(Spain) R Bautista Agut	4	6	6

Fourth round
18	(United States) J Isner	3	6	6^{7}
7	(Spain) R Bautista Agut	6	4	7^{9}

==== Section 3 ====
First round
WC	(Spain) C Alcaraz	4	6	5
(Finland) E Ruusuvuori	6	2	7
Q	(Chile) A Tabilo	3	1
(Sweden) M Ymer	6	6
WC	(France) H Gaston	6	6
(Germany) D Koepfer	1	4
(United States) S Johnson	5	2
(Germany) Y Hanfmann	7	6

Second round
3	(Germany) A Zverev	6	3	1
(Finland) E Ruusuvuori	1	6	6
(Sweden) M Ymer	6	4	6
27	(Georgia (country)) N Basilashvili	3	6	4
21	(Italy) J Sinner	6	6
WC	(France) H Gaston	2	2
(Germany) Y Hanfmann	3	2
14	(Russia) K Khachanov	6	6

Third round
(Finland) E Ruusuvuori	4	6	7
(Sweden) M Ymer	6	1	5
21	(Italy) J Sinner	4	7^{7}	6
14	(Russia) K Khachanov	6	6^{2}	4

Fourth round
(Finland) E Ruusuvuori	3	2
21	(Italy) J Sinner	6	6

==== Section 4 ====
First round
(United Kingdom) C Norrie	6	3	7
(Japan) Y Nishioka	1	6	5
(United States) M Giron	7^{7}	6
(United States) T Paul	6^{5}	4
(Czech Republic) J Veselý	3	7	1
(Serbia) L Đere	6	5	6
(Australia) J Duckworth	6	4	6
Q	(Germany) M Zverev	2	6	4

Second round
9	(Bulgaria) G Dimitrov	5	5
(United Kingdom) C Norrie	7	7
(United States) M Giron	2	2
22	(United States) T Fritz	6	6
32	(Kazakhstan) A Bublik	6	6
(Serbia) L Đere	3	4
(Australia) J Duckworth	6	6
8	(Belgium) D Goffin	3	1

Third round
(United Kingdom) C Norrie	4	6	1
22	(United States) T Fritz	6	3	6
32	(Kazakhstan) A Bublik	6	6
(Australia) J Duckworth	4	4

Fourth round
22	(United States) T Fritz	7^{7}	3	4
32	(Kazakhstan) A Bublik	6^{5}	6	6

=== Bottom half ===
==== Section 5 ====
First round
(Italy) S Caruso	3	4
(Japan) Y Uchiyama	6	6
(Serbia) M Kecmanović	7	6^{5}	6
Q	(United Kingdom) L Broady	5	7^{7}	1
WC	(United Kingdom) J Draper	5	0^{r}
(Kazakhstan) M Kukushkin	7	0
(United States) S Korda	6	6
(Moldova) R Albot	3	0

Second round
5	(Argentina) D Schwartzman	6	6
(Japan) Y Uchiyama	3	3
(Serbia) M Kecmanović	3	4
25	(France) A Mannarino	6	6
17	(Russia) A Karatsev	6	6
(Kazakhstan) M Kukushkin	4	3
(United States) S Korda	1	6	6
10	(Italy) F Fognini	6	4	2

Third round
5	(Argentina) D Schwartzman	6	6
25	(France) A Mannarino	1	4
17	(Russia) A Karatsev	3	0
(United States) S Korda	6	6

Fourth round
5	(Argentina) D Schwartzman	3	6	5
(United States) S Korda	6	4	7

==== Section 6 ====
First round
(Croatia) M Čilić	6	2	6
(Argentina) F Coria	3	6	4
WC	(United States) M Mmoh	4	4
(Italy) L Musetti	6	6
Q	(Japan) S Mochizuki	3	3
Q	(Australia) T Kokkinakis	6	6
(Spain) P Martínez	4	0^{r}
(United States) T Sandgren	6	2

Second round
13	(Chile) C Garín	6	5	6^{5}
(Croatia) M Čilić	3	7	7^{7}
(Italy) L Musetti	6	6
23	(France) B Paire	3	3
29	(Hungary) M Fucsovics	7^{7}	6^{4}	6
Q	(Australia) T Kokkinakis	6^{3}	7^{7}	4
(United States) T Sandgren	1	2
4	(Russia) A Rublev	6	6

Third round
(Croatia) M Čilić	6	6
(Italy) L Musetti	3	4
29	(Hungary) M Fucsovics	2	1
4	(Russia) A Rublev	6	6

Fourth round
(Croatia) M Čilić	4	4
4	(Russia) A Rublev	6	6

==== Section 7 ====
First round
(South Korea) S-w Kwon	6^{4}	7^{7}	6^{3}
(Belarus) I Ivashka	7^{7}	6^{4}	7^{7}
(France) J Chardy	6	3	4
(United States) D Kudla	3	6	6
(Australia) C O'Connell	6^{6}	7^{10}	5
(Portugal) J Sousa	7^{8}	6^{8}	7
(Australia) J Thompson	7^{8}	6
(Argentina) F Delbonis	6^{6}	4

Second round
6	(Canada) D Shapovalov	6^{5}	6	6
(Belarus) I Ivashka	7^{7}	4	4
(United States) D Kudla	6^{5}	4
26	(Poland) H Hurkacz	7^{7}	6
20	(France) U Humbert	6	6
(Portugal) J Sousa	1	4
(Australia) J Thompson	2	1
12	(Canada) M Raonic	6	6

Third round
6	(Canada) D Shapovalov	3	6^{6}
26	(Poland) H Hurkacz	6	7^{8}
20	(France) U Humbert	4	5
12	(Canada) M Raonic	6	7

Fourth round
26	(Poland) H Hurkacz	4	6	7^{7}
12	(Canada) M Raonic	6	3	6^{4}

==== Section 8 ====
First round
(Colombia) DE Galán	6	6
Q	(Brazil) T Seyboth Wild	3	4
Q	(United States) B Fratangelo	6	6
(Spain) F Verdasco	4	4
(Slovenia) A Bedene	7^{7}	1	6
Q	(Italy) T Fabbiano	6^{5}	6	3
PR	(South Africa) K Anderson	6^{6}	5
LL	(Bosnia and Herzegovina) D Džumhur	7^{8}	7

Second round
15	(Australia) A de Minaur	6	3	4
(Colombia) DE Galán	4	6	6
Q	(United States) B Fratangelo	4	6^{5}
24	(Italy) L Sonego	6	7^{7}
28	(Japan) K Nishikori	7^{8}	5	6
(Slovenia) A Bedene	6^{6}	7	4
LL	(Bosnia and Herzegovina) D Džumhur	1	4
2	(Greece) S Tsitsipas	6	6

Third round
(Colombia) DE Galán	6^{6}	3
24	(Italy) L Sonego	7^{8}	6
28	(Japan) K Nishikori	3	6	1
2	(Greece) S Tsitsipas	6	3	6

Fourth round
24	(Italy) L Sonego	2	6^{2}
2	(Greece) S Tsitsipas	6	7^{7}

== Qualifying ==
=== Seeds ===
1. (United States) Mackenzie McDonald (qualified)
2. (Brazil) Thiago Seyboth Wild (qualified)
3. (Bosnia and Herzegovina) Damir Džumhur (qualifying competition, lucky loser)
4. (Germany) Cedrik-Marcel Stebe (first round)
5. (Switzerland) Henri Laaksonen (first round)
6. (Italy) Federico Gaio (qualifying competition, lucky loser)
7. (Germany) Daniel Altmaier (first round, retired)
8. (Japan) Go Soeda (first round)
9. (United States) Brandon Nakashima (qualifying competition)
10. (Chinese Taipei) Jason Jung (qualifying competition)
11. (Spain) Bernabé Zapata Miralles (first round)
12. (Switzerland) Marc-Andrea Hüsler (qualifying competition)
13. (United States) Maxime Cressy (first round)
14. (Italy) Paolo Lorenzi (qualified)
15. (United Kingdom) Liam Broady (qualified)
16. (Serbia) Danilo Petrović (first round)
17. (Italy) Lorenzo Giustino (first round)
18. (Chile) Alejandro Tabilo (qualified)
19. (Croatia) Ivo Karlović (qualifying competition)
20. (Portugal) Frederico Ferreira Silva (first round)
21. (Ecuador) Emilio Gómez (qualifying competition)
22. (Italy) Thomas Fabbiano (qualified)
23. (Kazakhstan) Dmitry Popko (first round)
24. (Denmark) Mikael Torpegaard (first round)

=== Qualifiers ===
1. (United States) Mackenzie McDonald
2. (Brazil) Thiago Seyboth Wild
3. (Chile) Alejandro Tabilo
4. (Australia) Thanasi Kokkinakis
5. (Italy) Thomas Fabbiano
6. (United Kingdom) Liam Broady
7. (Japan) Shintaro Mochizuki
8. (United States) Emilio Nava
9. (United States) Ernesto Escobedo
10. (Italy) Paolo Lorenzi
11. (Germany) Mischa Zverev
12. (United States) Bjorn Fratangelo

=== Lucky losers ===
1. (Italy) Federico Gaio
2. (Bosnia and Herzegovina) Damir Džumhur

=== Qualifying draw ===
==== First qualifier ====
First round
1	(United States) Mackenzie McDonald	6	6
(Dominican Republic) Roberto Cid Subervi	1	1
(Japan) Tatsuma Ito	3	6^{3}
19	(Croatia) Ivo Karlović	6	7^{7}

Qualifying competition
1	(United States) Mackenzie McDonald	7^{7}	6
19	(Croatia) Ivo Karlović	6^{3}	4

==== Second qualifier ====
First round
2	(Brazil) Thiago Seyboth Wild	6	6
WC	(United States) Toby Kodat	3	3
(United States) Mitchell Krueger	6	6
17	(Italy) Lorenzo Giustino	4	3

Qualifying competition
2	(Brazil) Thiago Seyboth Wild	6	6
(United States) Mitchell Krueger	2	3

==== Third qualifier ====
First round
3	(Bosnia and Herzegovina) Damir Džumhur	7^{8}	6
(United States) Ulises Blanch	6^{6}	4
(United States) Thai-Son Kwiatkowski	3	4
18	(Chile) Alejandro Tabilo	6	6

Qualifying competition
3	(Bosnia and Herzegovina) Damir Džumhur	6	3	4
18	(Chile) Alejandro Tabilo	4	6	6

==== Fourth qualifier ====
First round
4	(Germany) Cedrik-Marcel Stebe	6^{5}	3
(Spain) Mario Vilella Martínez	7^{7}	6
(Australia) Thanasi Kokkinakis	6	7^{7}
20	(Portugal) Frederico Ferreira Silva	1	6^{3}

Qualifying competition
(Spain) Mario Vilella Martínez	5	1
(Australia) Thanasi Kokkinakis	7	6

==== Fifth qualifier ====
First round
5	(Switzerland) Henri Laaksonen	6^{2}	6	1
(United States) Jenson Brooksby	7^{7}	2	6
(Ecuador) Roberto Quiroz	4	6^{3}
22	(Italy) Thomas Fabbiano	6	7^{7}

Qualifying competition
(United States) Jenson Brooksby	7	2	5
22	(Italy) Thomas Fabbiano	5	6	7

==== Sixth qualifier ====
First round
6	(Italy) Federico Gaio	6	6
(Canada) Brayden Schnur	4	1
WC	(China) Shang Juncheng	6	1	6^{6}
15	(United Kingdom) Liam Broady	4	6	7^{8}

Qualifying competition
6	(Italy) Federico Gaio	6^{5}	7	2
15	(United Kingdom) Liam Broady	7^{7}	5	6

==== Seventh qualifier ====
First round
7	(Germany) Daniel Altmaier	1^{r}
WC	(Japan) Shintaro Mochizuki	4
(Romania) Marius Copil	3	4
21	(Ecuador) Emilio Gómez	6	6

Qualifying competition
WC	(Japan) Shintaro Mochizuki	6	6
21	(Ecuador) Emilio Gómez	1	2

==== Eighth qualifier ====
First round
8	(Japan) Go Soeda	3	4
(Argentina) Renzo Olivo	6	6
WC	(United States) Emilio Nava	3	6	6
24	(Denmark) Mikael Torpegaard	6	3	2

Qualifying competition
(Argentina) Renzo Olivo	6^{2}	7	4
WC	(United States) Emilio Nava	7^{7}	5	6

==== Ninth qualifier ====
First round
9	(United States) Brandon Nakashima	6^{5}	6	6
(United States) Christopher Eubanks	7^{7}	4	4
(United States) Ernesto Escobedo	6	6
13	(United States) Maxime Cressy	3	4

Qualifying competition
9	(United States) Brandon Nakashima	4	6^{4}
(United States) Ernesto Escobedo	6	7^{7}

==== Tenth qualifier ====
First round
10	(Chinese Taipei) Jason Jung	6	3	6
(France) Nicolas Mahut	4	6	1
(Brazil) João Menezes	6	6^{5}	1
14	(Italy) Paolo Lorenzi	3	7^{7}	6

Qualifying competition
10	(Chinese Taipei) Jason Jung	4	4
14	(Italy) Paolo Lorenzi	6	6

==== Eleventh qualifier ====
First round
11	(Spain) Bernabé Zapata Miralles	6^{2}	2
(Italy) Matteo Viola	7^{7}	6
WC	(Germany) Mischa Zverev	7^{7}	6
16	(Serbia) Danilo Petrović	6^{3}	2

Qualifying competition
(Italy) Matteo Viola	7^{7}	4	1
WC	(Germany) Mischa Zverev	6^{5}	6	6

==== Twelfth qualifier ====
First round
12	(Switzerland) Marc-Andrea Hüsler	6	7
(Argentina) Facundo Mena	2	5
(United States) Bjorn Fratangelo	7	6
23	(Kazakhstan) Dmitry Popko	5	2

Qualifying competition
12	(Switzerland) Marc-Andrea Hüsler	0	1
(United States) Bjorn Fratangelo	6	6
