= 2021 Miami Open – Women's doubles =

Women's doubles
- 2021 Miami Open

Final
- Champions: (Japan) Shuko Aoyama (Japan) Ena Shibahara
- Runners-up: (United States) Hayley Carter (Brazil) Luisa Stefani
- Score: 6–2, 7–5

Events
Singles	men	women
Doubles	men	women
← 2019 ·	Miami Open	· 2022 →

Shuko Aoyama and Ena Shibahara defeated Hayley Carter and Luisa Stefani in the final, 6–2, 7–5, to win the women's doubles tennis title at the 2021 Miami Open. Aoyama and Shibahara's first WTA 1000 victory earned them their third title of the year and made them the first Japanese champions in Miami since Ai Sugiyama in 2008.

Elise Mertens and Aryna Sabalenka were the defending champions from when the tournament was last held in 2019, but the pair lost in the first round to Simona Halep and Angelique Kerber.

Sabalenka, Tímea Babos and Hsieh Su-wei were in contention for the WTA doubles No. 1 ranking at the beginning at the tournament. Hsieh usurped Sabalenka for the top ranking after Sabalenka and Babos lost in the first and second round, respectively.

== Seeds ==
1. (Belgium) Elise Mertens / (Belarus) Aryna Sabalenka (first round)
2. (Czech Republic) Barbora Krejčíková / (Czech Republic) Kateřina Siniaková (second round)
3. (United States) Nicole Melichar / (Netherlands) Demi Schuurs (first round)
4. (Hungary) Tímea Babos / (Russia) Veronika Kudermetova (second round)
5. (Japan) Shuko Aoyama / (Japan) Ena Shibahara (champions)
6. (China) Xu Yifan / (China) Zhang Shuai (second round)
7. (Chile) Alexa Guarachi / (United States) Desirae Krawczyk (first round)
8. (United States) Hayley Carter / (Brazil) Luisa Stefani (final)

== Draw ==
=== Key ===
- Q = Qualifier
- WC = Wild card
- LL = Lucky loser
- Alt = Alternate
- SE = Special exempt
- PR = Protected ranking
- ITF = ITF entry
- JE = Junior exempt
- w/o = Walkover
- r = Retired
- d = Defaulted
- SR = Special ranking

=== Finals ===
Semifinals
(United States) Bethanie Mattek-Sands (Poland) Iga Świątek	6	6^{4}	[2]
5	(Japan) Shuko Aoyama (Japan) Ena Shibahara	3	7^{7}	[10]
8	(United States) Hayley Carter (Brazil) Luisa Stefani	2	6	[10]
(Canada) Gabriela Dabrowski (Mexico) Giuliana Olmos	6	3	[8]

Final
5	(Japan) Shuko Aoyama (Japan) Ena Shibahara	6	7
8	(United States) Hayley Carter (Brazil) Luisa Stefani	2	5

=== Top half ===
First round
1	(Belgium) E Mertens (Belarus) A Sabalenka	5	5
(Romania) S Halep (Germany) A Kerber	7	7
PR	(Belgium) K Flipkens (United States) C Vandeweghe	6	2	[6]
(Ukraine) L Kichenok (Latvia) J Ostapenko	3	6	[10]
(Russia) A Blinkova (Romania) M Niculescu	0	1
(United States) B Mattek-Sands (Poland) I Świątek	6	6
(United States) S Kenin (United States) S Stephens	6	3	[8]
6	(China) Y Xu (China) S Zhang	4	6	[10]
4	(Hungary) T Babos (Russia) V Kudermetova	3	6	[10]
(Australia) E Perez (China) S Zheng	6	4	[7]
Alt	(France) C Garcia (Argentina) N Podoroska	7^{7}	6
(Czech Republic) L Hradecká (Czech Republic) Kr Plíšková	6^{3}	2
PR	(United States) K Christian (Russia) A Kudryavtseva	2	3
(Croatia) D Jurak (Serbia) N Stojanović	6	6
(Slovenia) A Klepač (Slovenia) T Zidanšek	7^{7}	1	[6]
5	(Japan) S Aoyama (Japan) E Shibahara	6^{2}	6	[10]

Second round
(Romania) S Halep (Germany) A Kerber
(Ukraine) L Kichenok (Latvia) J Ostapenko	w/o
(United States) B Mattek-Sands (Poland) I Świątek	6	6
6	(China) Y Xu (China) S Zhang	3	1
4	(Hungary) T Babos (Russia) V Kudermetova	1	5
Alt	(France) C Garcia (Argentina) N Podoroska	6	7
(Croatia) D Jurak (Serbia) N Stojanović
5	(Japan) S Aoyama (Japan) E Shibahara	w/o

Quarterfinals
(Ukraine) L Kichenok (Latvia) J Ostapenko	1	4
(United States) B Mattek-Sands (Poland) I Świątek	6	6
Alt	(France) C Garcia (Argentina) N Podoroska	3	2
5	(Japan) S Aoyama (Japan) E Shibahara	6	6

Semifinals
(United States) B Mattek-Sands (Poland) I Świątek	6	6^{4}	[2]
5	(Japan) S Aoyama (Japan) E Shibahara	3	7^{7}	[10]

=== Bottom half ===
First round
8	(United States) H Carter (Brazil) L Stefani	6	6
(Kazakhstan) E Rybakina (Greece) M Sakkari	1	4
WC	(Australia) A Tomljanović (United Kingdom) H Watson	4	1
Alt	(Russia) E Alexandrova (China) Z Yang	6	6
WC	(United States) H Baptiste (United States) R Montgomery	2	2
Alt	(Croatia) P Martić (United States) S Rogers	6	6
Alt	(United States) A Muhammad (United States) J Pegula	6	6
3	(United States) N Melichar (Netherlands) D Schuurs	2	2
7	(Chile) A Guarachi (United States) D Krawczyk	3	6	[7]
(Canada) G Dabrowski (Mexico) G Olmos	6	4	[10]
PR	(United States) V King (Kazakhstan) Y Shvedova	5	2
(Germany) A-L Friedsam (Australia) S Sanders	7	6
(United States) C Gauff (United States) C McNally	6	6
(Ukraine) N Kichenok (Romania) R Olaru	3	1
WC	(Netherlands) K Bertens (Netherlands) A Rus	1	4
2	(Czech Republic) B Krejčíková (Czech Republic) K Siniaková	6	6

Second round
8	(United States) H Carter (Brazil) L Stefani	6	6
Alt	(Russia) E Alexandrova (China) Z Yang	0	3
Alt	(Croatia) P Martić (United States) S Rogers	6	3	[3]
Alt	(United States) A Muhammad (United States) J Pegula	4	6	[10]
(Canada) G Dabrowski (Mexico) G Olmos	6	6
(Germany) A-L Friedsam (Australia) S Sanders	2	4
(United States) C Gauff (United States) C McNally	6^{5}	6	[10]
2	(Czech Republic) B Krejčíková (Czech Republic) K Siniaková	7^{7}	4	[8]

Quarterfinals
8	(United States) H Carter (Brazil) L Stefani	6	6
Alt	(United States) A Muhammad (United States) J Pegula	4	1
(Canada) G Dabrowski (Mexico) G Olmos	6	7^{7}
(United States) C Gauff (United States) C McNally	4	6^{4}

Semifinals
8	(United States) H Carter (Brazil) L Stefani	2	6	[10]
(Canada) G Dabrowski (Mexico) G Olmos	6	3	[8]
