= 2021 Miami Open – Women's singles =

Women's singles
- 2021 Miami Open

Final
- Champion: (Australia) Ashleigh Barty
- Runner-up: (Canada) Bianca Andreescu
- Score: 6–3, 4–0, ret.

Details
- Draw: 96
- Seeds: 32

Events
| Singles | men | women |
| Doubles | men | women |
| ← 2019 · | Miami Open | · 2022 → |

Defending champion Ashleigh Barty won the women's singles tennis title at the 2021 Miami Open after Bianca Andreescu retired from the final with the scoreline at 6–3, 4–0. Barty saved a match point en route to the title, in the second round against Kristína Kučová.

Barty and Naomi Osaka were in contention for the WTA No. 1 singles ranking. Barty retained the top ranking by winning the title after Osaka lost to Maria Sakkari in the quarterfinals, ending a 23-match winning streak dating to the 2020 Cincinnati Masters.

== Seeds ==
All seeds received a bye into the second round.

1. (Australia) Ashleigh Barty (champion)
2. (Japan) Naomi Osaka (quarterfinals)
3. (Romania) Simona Halep (third round, withdrew)
4. (United States) Sofia Kenin (third round)
5. (Ukraine) Elina Svitolina (semifinals)
6. (Czech Republic) Karolína Plíšková (third round)
7. (Belarus) Aryna Sabalenka (quarterfinals)
8. (Canada) Bianca Andreescu (final, retired)
9. (Czech Republic) Petra Kvitová (fourth round)
10. (Netherlands) Kiki Bertens (second round)
11. (Switzerland) Belinda Bencic (third round)
12. (Spain) Garbiñe Muguruza (fourth round)
13. (United States) Jennifer Brady (second round)
14. (Belarus) Victoria Azarenka (fourth round)
15. (Poland) Iga Świątek (third round)
16. (Belgium) Elise Mertens (fourth round)

17. (United Kingdom) Johanna Konta (third round)
18. (United States) Madison Keys (second round)
19. (Czech Republic) Markéta Vondroušová (fourth round)
20. (Croatia) Petra Martić (second round)
21. (Kazakhstan) Elena Rybakina (third round)
22. (Estonia) Anett Kontaveit (third round)
23. (Greece) Maria Sakkari (semifinals)
24. (Germany) Angelique Kerber (third round)
25. (United States) Alison Riske (withdrew)
26. (Kazakhstan) Yulia Putintseva (second round)
27. (Tunisia) Ons Jabeur (fourth round)
28. (United States) Amanda Anisimova (third round)
29. (United States) Jessica Pegula (fourth round)
30. (Russia) Ekaterina Alexandrova (third round)
31. (United States) Coco Gauff (second round)
32. (Russia) Veronika Kudermetova (third round)

Click on the seed number of a player to go to their draw section.

== Draw ==
=== Key ===
- Q = Qualifier
- WC = Wild card
- LL = Lucky loser
- Alt = Alternate
- SE = Special exempt
- PR = Protected ranking
- ITF = ITF entry
- JE = Junior exempt
- w/o = Walkover
- r = Retired
- d = Defaulted
- SR = Special ranking

=== Finals ===
Quarterfinals
1 | (Australia) Ashleigh Barty | 6 | 6^{5} | 6
7 | (Belarus) Aryna Sabalenka | 4 | 7^{7} | 3
(Latvia) Anastasija Sevastova | 3 | 2
5 | (Ukraine) Elina Svitolina | 6 | 6
8 | (Canada) Bianca Andreescu | 6 | 3 | 6
(Spain) Sara Sorribes Tormo | 4 | 6 | 3
23 | (Greece) Maria Sakkari | 6 | 6
2 | (Japan) Naomi Osaka | 0 | 4

Semifinals
1 | (Australia) Ashleigh Barty | 6 | 6
5 | (Ukraine) Elina Svitolina | 3 | 3
8 | (Canada) Bianca Andreescu | 7^{9} | 3 | 7^{7}
23 | (Greece) Maria Sakkari | 6^{7} | 6 | 6^{4}

Final
1 | (Australia) Ashleigh Barty | 6 | 4
8 | (Canada) Bianca Andreescu | 3 | 0^{r}

=== Top half ===
==== Section 1 ====
First round
Q | (United States) H Baptiste | 4 | 6 | 5
Q | (Slovakia) K Kučová | 6 | 2 | 7
(Latvia) J Ostapenko | 6 | 6^{4} | 6
WC | (China) Xiyu Wang | 4 | 7^{7} | 1
(Japan) N Hibino | 4 | 6 | 1
Q | (Mexico) R Zarazúa | 6 | 4 | 6
(United States) C McHale | 3 | 5
(Germany) L Siegemund | 6 | 7

Second round
1 | (Australia) A Barty | 6 | 4 | 7
Q | (Slovakia) K Kučová | 3 | 6 | 5
(Latvia) J Ostapenko | 6 | 5 | 6
LL | (Belgium) K Flipkens | 2 | 7 | 3
24 | (Germany) A Kerber | 6 | 6
Q | (Mexico) R Zarazúa | 0 | 0
(Germany) L Siegemund
14 | (Belarus) V Azarenka | w/o

Third round
1 | (Australia) A Barty | 6 | 6
(Latvia) J Ostapenko | 3 | 2
24 | (Germany) A Kerber | 5 | 2
14 | (Belarus) V Azarenka | 7 | 6

Fourth round
1 | (Australia) A Barty | 6 | 1 | 6
14 | (Belarus) V Azarenka | 1 | 6 | 2

==== Section 2 ====
First round
(Kazakhstan) Z Diyas | 6 | 7^{12}
(United States) V Williams | 2 | 6^{10}
Q | (Spain) A Bolsova | 1 | 6 | 3
(China) Q Wang | 6 | 3 | 6
(France) K Mladenovic | 3 | 3
(United States) D Collins | 6 | 6
Q | (Bulgaria) T Pironkova | 7^{7} | 3 | 6
(Ukraine) M Kostyuk | 6^{4} | 6 | 3

Second round
11 | (Switzerland) B Bencic | 6 | 6
(Kazakhstan) Z Diyas | 2 | 1
(China) Q Wang | 4 | 4
19 | (Czech Republic) M Vondroušová | 6 | 6
32 | (Russia) V Kudermetova | 6 | 6
(United States) D Collins | 3 | 2
Q | (Bulgaria) T Pironkova | 6 | 3 | 6^{9}
7 | (Belarus) A Sabalenka | 0 | 6 | 7^{11}

Third round
11 | (Switzerland) B Bencic | 6 | 4 | 4
19 | (Czech Republic) M Vondroušová | 4 | 6 | 6
32 | (Russia) V Kudermetova | 6^{4} | 4
7 | (Belarus) A Sabalenka | 7^{7} | 6

Fourth round
19 | (Czech Republic) M Vondroušová | 1 | 2
7 | (Belarus) A Sabalenka | 6 | 6

==== Section 3 ====
First round
Q | (Romania) M Buzărnescu | 1 | 2
(France) C Garcia | 6 | 6
Q | (Serbia) O Danilović | 1 | 6 | 6^{3}
(Latvia) A Sevastova | 6 | 3 | 7^{7}
(Czech Republic) K Siniaková | 6^{3} | 5
WC | (Croatia) A Konjuh | 7^{7} | 7
(Czech Republic) B Krejčíková | 6 | 3 | 6
(Russia) A Blinkova | 1 | 6 | 3

Second round
3 | (Romania) S Halep | 3 | 6 | 6
(France) C Garcia | 6 | 4 | 0
(Latvia) A Sevastova | 1 | 6 | 6
31 | (United States) C Gauff | 6 | 2 | 3
18 | (United States) M Keys | 4 | 2
WC | (Croatia) A Konjuh | 6 | 6
(Czech Republic) B Krejčíková | 4 | 2
15 | (Poland) I Świątek | 6 | 6

Third round
3 | (Romania) S Halep
(Latvia) A Sevastova | w/o
WC | (Croatia) A Konjuh | 6 | 2 | 6
15 | (Poland) I Świątek | 4 | 6 | 2

Fourth round
(Latvia) A Sevastova | 6 | 7
WC | (Croatia) A Konjuh | 1 | 5

==== Section 4 ====
First round
(France) A Cornet | 2 | 6 | 6
(Russia) S Kuznetsova | 6 | 2 | 1
(Poland) M Linette | 6 | 3 | 6
WC | (United States) R Montgomery | 1 | 6 | 0
(Argentina) N Podoroska | 6 | 6
WC | (Egypt) M Sherif | 3 | 1
(United States) S Rogers | 6 | 6
(United States) M Brengle | 3 | 3

Second round
9 | (Czech Republic) P Kvitová | 6 | 6
(France) A Cornet | 0 | 4
(Poland) M Linette | 4 | 5
17 | (United Kingdom) J Konta | 6 | 7
30 | (Russia) E Alexandrova | 6 | 6
(Argentina) N Podoroska | 0 | 4
(United States) S Rogers | 6 | 5 | 3
5 | (Ukraine) E Svitolina | 3 | 7 | 6

Third round
9 | (Czech Republic) P Kvitová | 6 | 6
17 | (United Kingdom) J Konta | 1 | 2
30 | (Russia) E Alexandrova | 6^{1} | 4
5 | (Ukraine) E Svitolina | 7^{7} | 6

Fourth round
9 | (Czech Republic) P Kvitová | 6 | 5 | 5
5 | (Ukraine) E Svitolina | 2 | 7 | 7

=== Bottom half ===
==== Section 5 ====
First round
PR | (Kazakhstan) Y Shvedova | 4 | 2
Q | (Czech Republic) T Martincová | 6 | 6
(United States) S Stephens | 6^{6} | 6 | 6
Q | (France) O Dodin | 7^{8} | 4 | 2
WC | (Russia) A Kalinskaya | 6 | 7^{7}
(Romania) I-C Begu | 4 | 6^{5}
(Sweden) R Peterson | 2 | 2
WC | (China) Xin Wang | 6 | 6

Second round
8 | (Canada) B Andreescu | 7^{7} | 6
Q | (Czech Republic) T Martincová | 6^{5} | 2
(United States) S Stephens | 3 | 3
28 | (United States) A Anisimova | 6 | 6
20 | (Croatia) P Martić | 7 | 2 | 6^{4}
WC | (Russia) A Kalinskaya | 5 | 6 | 7^{7}
WC | (China) Xin Wang | 4 | 1
12 | (Spain) G Muguruza | 6 | 6

Third round
8 | (Canada) B Andreescu | 7^{7} | 6^{2} | 6
28 | (United States) A Anisimova | 6^{4} | 7^{7} | 4
WC | (Russia) A Kalinskaya | 6 | 3 | 4
12 | (Spain) G Muguruza | 4 | 6 | 6

Fourth round
8 | (Canada) B Andreescu | 3 | 6 | 6
12 | (Spain) G Muguruza | 6 | 3 | 2

==== Section 6 ====
First round
(United States) B Pera | 2 | 6 | 5
(Spain) S Sorribes Tormo | 6 | 2 | 7
(Estonia) K Kanepi | 6 | 7
(United States) L Davis | 3 | 5
(Switzerland) J Teichmann | 6^{r}
(Spain) P Badosa | 5
PR | (Germany) A Petkovic | 7 | 6
(China) S Zhang | 5 | 1

Second round
13 | (United States) J Brady | 6 | 4 | 1
(Spain) S Sorribes Tormo | 3 | 6 | 6
(Estonia) K Kanepi | 4 | 0
21 | (Kazakhstan) E Rybakina | 6 | 6
27 | (Tunisia) O Jabeur | 7^{8} | 5 | 7
(Spain) P Badosa | 6^{6} | 7 | 5
PR | (Germany) A Petkovic | 7^{8} | 1 | 3
4 | (United States) S Kenin | 6^{6} | 6 | 6

Third round
(Spain) S Sorribes Tormo | 6 | 3 | 6
21 | (Kazakhstan) E Rybakina | 1 | 6 | 2
27 | (Tunisia) O Jabeur | 6 | 4 | 6
4 | (United States) S Kenin | 4 | 6 | 4

Fourth round
(Spain) S Sorribes Tormo | 6 | 0 | 6
27 | (Tunisia) O Jabeur | 4 | 6 | 1

==== Section 7 ====
First round
(China) S Zheng | 2 | 6 | 6
(France) F Ferro | 6 | 4 | 3
Q | (Italy) E Cocciaretto | 1 | 7 | 1
WC | (Australia) S Sanders | 6 | 5 | 6
(Czech Republic) M Bouzková | 3 | 2
(Netherlands) A Rus | 6 | 6
(Italy) C Giorgi | 2 | 4
Q | (Russia) L Samsonova | 6 | 6

Second round
6 | (Czech Republic) Ka Plíšková | 6 | 6
(China) S Zheng | 2 | 1
WC | (Australia) S Sanders | 3 | 4
29 | (United States) J Pegula | 6 | 6
23 | (Greece) M Sakkari | 6 | 6
(Netherlands) A Rus | 2 | 3
Q | (Russia) L Samsonova | 6 | 6
10 | (Netherlands) K Bertens | 2 | 1

Third round
6 | (Czech Republic) Ka Plíšková | 1 | 6 | 4
29 | (United States) J Pegula | 6 | 4 | 6
23 | (Greece) M Sakkari | 6 | 6
Q | (Russia) L Samsonova | 0 | 1

Fourth round
29 | (United States) J Pegula | 4 | 6 | 6^{6}
23 | (Greece) M Sakkari | 6 | 2 | 7^{8}

==== Section 8 ====
First round
(Czech Republic) Kr Plíšková | 6 | 3 | 3
PR | (United Kingdom) K Boulter | 4 | 6 | 6
(Romania) S Cîrstea | 6 | 6
WC | (United States) K Scott | 2 | 2
(United Kingdom) H Watson | 4 | 1
Q | (Serbia) N Stojanović | 6 | 6
PR | (Russia) A Potapova | 5 | 0
(Australia) A Tomljanović | 7 | 6

Second round
16 | (Belgium) E Mertens | 6 | 6
PR | (United Kingdom) K Boulter | 4 | 1
(Romania) S Cîrstea | 3 | 6 | 3
22 | (Estonia) A Kontaveit | 6 | 4 | 6
26 | (Kazakhstan) Y Putintseva | 7 | 5 | 2
Q | (Serbia) N Stojanović | 5 | 7 | 6
(Australia) A Tomljanović | 6^{3} | 4
2 | (Japan) N Osaka | 7^{7} | 6

Third round
16 | (Belgium) E Mertens | 6 | 0 | 6
22 | (Estonia) A Kontaveit | 2 | 6 | 2
Q | (Serbia) N Stojanović
2 | (Japan) N Osaka | w/o

Fourth round
16 | (Belgium) E Mertens | 3 | 3
2 | (Japan) N Osaka | 6 | 6

== Qualifying ==
=== Seeds ===
1. (Japan) Misaki Doi (first round)
2. (Canada) Leylah Fernandez (first round)
3. (Italy) Martina Trevisan (first round)
4. (Belgium) Kirsten Flipkens (qualifying competition, lucky loser)
5. (Slovenia) Tamara Zidanšek (qualifying competition)
6. (Russia) Varvara Gracheva (qualifying competition)
7. (Serbia) Nina Stojanović (qualified)
8. (Italy) Jasmine Paolini (first round)
9. (China) Zhu Lin (first round)
10. (China) Wang Yafan (first round)
11. (Slovakia) Viktória Kužmová (qualifying competition, retired)
12. (Hungary) Tímea Babos (qualifying competition)
13. (Czech Republic) Tereza Martincová (qualified)
14. (Spain) Aliona Bolsova (qualified)
15. (Italy) Sara Errani (first round)
16. (Belgium) Greet Minnen (qualifying competition)
17. (Slovakia) Anna Karolína Schmiedlová (qualifying competition)
18. (Italy) Elisabetta Cocciaretto (qualified)
19. (United States) Caty McNally (first round)
20. (France) Océane Dodin (qualified)
21. (United States) Kristie Ahn (qualifying competition)
22. (Germany) Anna-Lena Friedsam (qualifying competition)
23. (Russia) Liudmila Samsonova (qualified)
24. (Australia) Astra Sharma (first round)

=== Qualifiers ===
1. (United States) Hailey Baptiste
2. (Romania) Mihaela Buzărnescu
3. (Bulgaria) Tsvetana Pironkova
4. (Spain) Aliona Bolsova
5. (France) Océane Dodin
6. (Russia) Liudmila Samsonova
7. (Serbia) Nina Stojanović
8. (Serbia) Olga Danilović
9. (Czech Republic) Tereza Martincová
10. (Slovakia) Kristína Kučová
11. (Mexico) Renata Zarazúa
12. (Italy) Elisabetta Cocciaretto

=== Lucky loser ===
1. (Belgium) Kirsten Flipkens

=== Qualifying draw ===
==== First qualifier ====
First round
1 | (Japan) Misaki Doi | 6 | 0 | 6^{6}
WC | (United States) Hailey Baptiste | 1 | 6 | 7^{8}
(United States) Usue Maitane Arconada | 4 | 4
16 | (Belgium) Greet Minnen | 6 | 6

Qualifying competition
WC | (United States) Hailey Baptiste | 6 | 6
16 | (Belgium) Greet Minnen | 3 | 4

==== Second qualifier ====
First round
2 | (Canada) Leylah Fernandez | 4 | 2
(Romania) Mihaela Buzărnescu | 6 | 6
(Switzerland) Leonie Küng | 7 | 1 | 4
22 | (Germany) Anna-Lena Friedsam | 5 | 6 | 6

Qualifying competition
(Romania) Mihaela Buzărnescu | 2 | 7^{7} | 7
22 | (Germany) Anna-Lena Friedsam | 6 | 6^{4} | 5

==== Third qualifier ====
First round
3 | (Italy) Martina Trevisan | 6 | 1 | 6^{4}
(Belarus) Olga Govortsova | 4 | 6 | 7^{7}
(Bulgaria) Tsvetana Pironkova | 7^{7} | 7^{7}
19 | (United States) Caty McNally | 6^{0} | 6^{4}

Qualifying competition
(Belarus) Olga Govortsova | 0 | 3
(Bulgaria) Tsvetana Pironkova | 6 | 6

==== Fourth qualifier ====
First round
4 | (Belgium) Kirsten Flipkens | 4 | 6 | 6
(United States) Whitney Osuigwe | 6 | 3 | 1
PR | (United States) CoCo Vandeweghe | 2 | 3
14 | (Spain) Aliona Bolsova | 6 | 6

Qualifying competition
4 | (Belgium) Kirsten Flipkens | 4 | 3
14 | (Spain) Aliona Bolsova | 6 | 6

==== Fifth qualifier ====
First round
5 | (Slovenia) Tamara Zidanšek | 6 | 6
(Australia) Arina Rodionova | 3 | 0
WC | (Sweden) Mirjam Björklund | 2 | 1
20 | (France) Océane Dodin | 6 | 6

Qualifying competition
5 | (Slovenia) Tamara Zidanšek | 1 | 5
20 | (France) Océane Dodin | 6 | 7

==== Sixth qualifier ====
First round
6 | (Russia) Varvara Gracheva | 7 | 6
Alt | (Canada) Gabriela Dabrowski | 5 | 2
(Romania) Monica Niculescu | 6 | 0^{r}
23 | (Russia) Liudmila Samsonova | 2 | 4

Qualifying competition
6 | (Russia) Varvara Gracheva | 2 | 4
23 | (Russia) Liudmila Samsonova | 6 | 6

==== Seventh qualifier ====
First round
7 | (Serbia) Nina Stojanović | 4 | 6 | 6
WC | (Czech Republic) Linda Fruhvirtová | 6 | 4 | 2
WC | (United States) Bethanie Mattek-Sands | 6 | 3 | 6
15 | (Italy) Sara Errani | 4 | 6 | 4

Qualifying competition
7 | (Serbia) Nina Stojanović | 6 | 6
WC | (United States) Bethanie Mattek-Sands | 4 | 3

==== Eighth qualifier ====
First round
8 | (Italy) Jasmine Paolini | 7^{7} | 1 | 4
(Serbia) Olga Danilović | 6^{2} | 6 | 6
(United States) Francesca Di Lorenzo | 1 | 4
21 | (United States) Kristie Ahn | 6 | 6

Qualifying competition
(Serbia) Olga Danilović | 7^{7} | 6
21 | (United States) Kristie Ahn | 6^{4} | 3

==== Ninth qualifier ====
First round
9 | (China) Zhu Lin | 6^{10} | 6 | 2
(United Kingdom) Harriet Dart | 7^{12} | 4 | 6
(Bulgaria) Viktoriya Tomova | 4 | 1
13 | (Czech Republic) Tereza Martincová | 6 | 6

Qualifying competition
(United Kingdom) Harriet Dart | 3 | 5
13 | (Czech Republic) Tereza Martincová | 6 | 7

==== Tenth qualifier ====
First round
10 | (China) Wang Yafan | 5 | 2
(Slovakia) Kristína Kučová | 7 | 6
(Poland) Katarzyna Kawa | 4 | 3
17 | (Slovakia) Anna Karolína Schmiedlová | 6 | 6

Qualifying competition
(Slovakia) Kristína Kučová | 6 | 6
17 | (Slovakia) Anna Karolína Schmiedlová | 2 | 3

==== Eleventh qualifier ====
First round
11 | (Slovakia) Viktória Kužmová | 4 | 6 | 6
WC | (Philippines) Alex Eala | 6 | 4 | 2
(Mexico) Renata Zarazúa | 5 | 6 | 7
24 | (Australia) Astra Sharma | 7 | 3 | 5

Qualifying competition
11 | (Slovakia) Viktória Kužmová | 3 | 0^{r}
(Mexico) Renata Zarazúa | 6 | 1

==== Twelfth qualifier ====
First round
12 | (Hungary) Tímea Babos | 4 | 6 | 6
(United States) Caroline Dolehide | 6 | 2 | 2
WC | (United States) Claire Liu | 4 | 4
18 | (Italy) Elisabetta Cocciaretto | 6 | 6

Qualifying competition
12 | (Hungary) Tímea Babos | 6 | 3 | 3
18 | (Italy) Elisabetta Cocciaretto | 2 | 6 | 6
