= 2019 Miami Open – Women's doubles =

Women's doubles
- 2019 Miami Open

Final
- Champions: (Belgium) Elise Mertens (Belarus) Aryna Sabalenka
- Runners-up: (Australia) Samantha Stosur (China) Zhang Shuai
- Score: 7–6^{(7–5)}, 6–2

Events
Singles	men	women
Doubles	men	women
← 2018 ·	Miami Open	· 2021 →

Elise Mertens and Aryna Sabalenka defeated Samantha Stosur and Zhang Shuai in the final, 7–6^{(7–5)}, 6–2 to win the women's doubles tennis title at the 2019 Miami Open. With the win, they completed the Sunshine Double, having won Indian Wells two weeks prior.

Ashleigh Barty and CoCo Vandeweghe were the reigning champions, but Vandeweghe did not participate due to injury. Barty partnered Victoria Azarenka, but lost in the semifinals to Mertens and Sabalenka.

== Seeds ==
1. (Czech Republic) Barbora Krejčíková / (Czech Republic) Kateřina Siniaková (first round)
2. (Hungary) Tímea Babos / (France) Kristina Mladenovic (first round)
3. (Chinese Taipei) Hsieh Su-wei / (Czech Republic) Barbora Strýcová (second round)
4. (United States) Nicole Melichar / (Czech Republic) Květa Peschke (first round)
5. (Canada) Gabriela Dabrowski / (China) Xu Yifan (quarterfinals)
6. (Australia) Samantha Stosur / (China) Zhang Shuai (final)
7. (Slovenia) Andreja Klepač / (Spain) María José Martínez Sánchez (first round)
8. (Chinese Taipei) Chan Hao-ching / (Chinese Taipei) Latisha Chan (semifinals)

== Draw ==
=== Key ===
- Q = Qualifier
- WC = Wild card
- LL = Lucky loser
- Alt = Alternate
- SE = Special exempt
- PR = Protected ranking
- ITF = ITF entry
- JE = Junior exempt
- w/o = Walkover
- r = Retired
- d = Defaulted
- SR = Special ranking

=== Finals ===
Semifinals
WC	(Belarus) Victoria Azarenka (Australia) Ashleigh Barty	6^{6}	5
(Belgium) Elise Mertens (Belarus) Aryna Sabalenka	7^{8}	7
8	(Chinese Taipei) Chan Hao-ching (Chinese Taipei) Latisha Chan	7^{8}	5	[5]
6	(Australia) Samantha Stosur (China) Zhang Shuai	6^{6}	7	[10]

Final
(Belgium) Elise Mertens (Belarus) Aryna Sabalenka	7^{7}	6
6	(Australia) Samantha Stosur (China) Zhang Shuai	6^{5}	2

=== Top half ===
First round
1	(Czech Republic) B Krejčíková (Czech Republic) K Siniaková	3	7^{7}	[7]
WC	(Belarus) V Azarenka (Australia) A Barty	6	6^{1}	[10]
(Serbia) A Krunić (Russia) A Panova	6	6
WC	(United States) L Davis (United States) C McHale	2	2
(Croatia) D Jurak (Romania) R Olaru	3	6	[10]
(United States) D Krawczyk (United States) S Santamaria	6	3	[3]
(Spain) L Arruabarrena (United Kingdom) H Watson	6	7
7	(Slovenia) A Klepač (Spain) MJ Martínez Sánchez	2	5
3	(Chinese Taipei) S-w Hsieh (Czech Republic) B Strýcová	7	7
(United States) K Christian (United States) A Muhammad	5	5
(Belgium) E Mertens (Belarus) A Sabalenka	6	6
(United States) D Collins (Latvia) J Ostapenko	3	0
(Poland) A Rosolska (China) Z Yang	4	7	[10]
(Belgium) K Flipkens (Sweden) J Larsson	6	5	[4]
(Slovenia) D Jakupović (Russia) I Khromacheva	2	3
5	(Canada) G Dabrowski (China) Y Xu	6	6

Second round
WC	(Belarus) V Azarenka (Australia) A Barty	6	1	[10]
(Serbia) A Krunić (Russia) A Panova	3	6	[7]
(Croatia) D Jurak (Romania) R Olaru	7	6
(Spain) L Arruabarrena (United Kingdom) H Watson	5	3
3	(Chinese Taipei) S-w Hsieh (Czech Republic) B Strýcová	6^{3}	6	[3]
(Belgium) E Mertens (Belarus) A Sabalenka	7^{7}	2	[10]
(Poland) A Rosolska (China) Z Yang	6^{5}	7^{7}	[7]
5	(Canada) G Dabrowski (China) Y Xu	7^{7}	6^{5}	[10]

Quarterfinals
WC	(Belarus) V Azarenka (Australia) A Barty	6	6
(Croatia) D Jurak (Romania) R Olaru	1	3
(Belgium) E Mertens (Belarus) A Sabalenka	6	6
5	(Canada) G Dabrowski (China) Y Xu	2	2

Semifinals
WC	(Belarus) V Azarenka (Australia) A Barty	6^{6}	5
(Belgium) E Mertens (Belarus) A Sabalenka	7^{8}	7

=== Bottom half ===
First round
8	(Chinese Taipei) H-c Chan (Chinese Taipei) L Chan	3	7	[10]
(Romania) I-C Begu (Romania) M Buzărnescu	6	5	[8]
(Russia) A Pavlyuchenkova (Latvia) A Sevastova	2	3
(Russia) V Kudermetova (Netherlands) D Schuurs	6	6
(Japan) M Kato (Japan) M Ninomiya	3	4
(Japan) S Aoyama (Belarus) L Marozava	6	6
(Switzerland) B Bencic (Russia) D Kasatkina	4	6	[10]
4	(United States) N Melichar (Czech Republic) K Peschke	6	4	[8]
6	(Australia) S Stosur (China) S Zhang	6	3	[10]
(United States) R Atawo (Slovenia) K Srebotnik	3	6	[4]
(Ukraine) L Kichenok (Ukraine) N Kichenok	6	2	[10]
WC	(United States) A Anisimova (United States) A Riske	3	6	[4]
(Germany) A-L Grönefeld (Czech Republic) L Hradecká	3	5
(Romania) M Niculescu (United States) A Spears	6	7
(Germany) J Görges (Romania) S Halep	4	6	[10]
2	(Hungary) T Babos (France) K Mladenovic	6	1	[6]

Second round
8	(Chinese Taipei) H-c Chan (Chinese Taipei) L Chan	7	6
(Russia) V Kudermetova (Netherlands) D Schuurs	5	2
(Japan) S Aoyama (Belarus) L Marozava	3	6	[13]
(Switzerland) B Bencic (Russia) D Kasatkina	6	3	[15]
6	(Australia) S Stosur (China) S Zhang	7	5	[10]
(Ukraine) L Kichenok (Ukraine) N Kichenok	5	7	[6]
(Romania) M Niculescu (United States) A Spears	1	7	[10]
(Germany) J Görges (Romania) S Halep	6	5	[8]

Quarterfinals
8	(Chinese Taipei) H-c Chan (Chinese Taipei) L Chan	6	4	[10]
(Switzerland) B Bencic (Russia) D Kasatkina	3	6	[8]
6	(Australia) S Stosur (China) S Zhang	6	6^{4}	[10]
(Romania) M Niculescu (United States) A Spears	3	7^{7}	[6]

Semifinals
8	(Chinese Taipei) H-c Chan (Chinese Taipei) L Chan	7^{8}	5	[5]
6	(Australia) S Stosur (China) S Zhang	6^{6}	7	[10]
