= 2021 Miami Open – Men's doubles =

Men's doubles
- 2021 Miami Open

Final
- Champions: (Croatia) Nikola Mektić (Croatia) Mate Pavić
- Runners-up: (United Kingdom) Dan Evans (United Kingdom) Neal Skupski
- Score: 6–4, 6–4

Events
Singles	men	women
Doubles	men	women
- Miami Open

Nikola Mektić and Mate Pavić defeated Dan Evans and Neal Skupski in the final, 6–4, 6–4, to win the men's doubles tennis title at the 2021 Miami Open. They did not drop a set en route to the title and became the first all-Croatian team to win the Miami Open. Pavić also usurped Robert Farah for the ATP No. 1 doubles ranking by winning the title after Farah lost in the second round.

Bob and Mike Bryan were the defending champions from when the tournament was last held in 2019, but they retired from professional tennis in August 2020.

== Seeds ==
1. (Colombia) Juan Sebastián Cabal / (Colombia) Robert Farah (second round)
2. (Croatia) Nikola Mektić / (Croatia) Mate Pavić (champions)
3. (Spain) Marcel Granollers / (Argentina) Horacio Zeballos (first round)
4. (Croatia) Ivan Dodig / (Slovakia) Filip Polášek (semifinals)
5. (United Kingdom) Jamie Murray / (Brazil) Bruno Soares (second round)
6. (Netherlands) Wesley Koolhof / (Poland) Łukasz Kubot (first round)
7. (United States) Rajeev Ram / (United Kingdom) Joe Salisbury (semifinals)
8. (France) Pierre-Hugues Herbert / (France) Nicolas Mahut (second round)

== Draw ==
Key

- Q = Qualifier
- WC = Wild card
- LL = Lucky loser
- Alt = Alternate
- ITF = ITF entry
- PR = Protected ranking
- SR = Special ranking
- SE = Special exempt
- JE = Junior exempt
- JR = Junior Accelerator Programme entrant
- CO = College Accelerator Programme entrant
- NG = Next Gen Accelerator Program entrant
- w/o = Walkover
- r = Retired
- d = Defaulted

=== Finals ===
Semifinals
(United Kingdom) Dan Evans (United Kingdom) Neal Skupski	7^{7}	1	[10]
4	(Croatia) Ivan Dodig (Slovakia) Filip Polášek	6^{4}	6	[8]
7	(United States) Rajeev Ram (United Kingdom) Joe Salisbury	3	6^{5}
2	(Croatia) Nikola Mektić (Croatia) Mate Pavić	6	7^{7}

Final
(United Kingdom) Dan Evans (United Kingdom) Neal Skupski	4	4
2	(Croatia) Nikola Mektić (Croatia) Mate Pavić	6	6

=== Top half ===
First round
1	(Colombia) JS Cabal (Colombia) R Farah	6	6
(Serbia) N Ćaćić (Serbia) D Lajović	3	4
(Finland) H Kontinen (France) É Roger-Vasselin	4	3
(El Salvador) M Arévalo (Romania) H Tecău	6	6
WC	(United States) N Monroe (United States) F Tiafoe	6^{4}	2
(United Kingdom) D Evans (United Kingdom) N Skupski	7^{7}	6
(New Zealand) M Daniell (Austria) P Oswald	4	4
5	(United Kingdom) J Murray (Brazil) B Soares	6	6
4	(Croatia) I Dodig (Slovakia) F Polášek	7^{7}	6
(France) J Chardy (France) F Martin	6^{4}	3
(Canada) F Auger-Aliassime (Poland) H Hurkacz	6	6
(Belgium) S Gillé (Belgium) J Vliegen	4	3
(Germany) K Krawietz (Germany) J-L Struff	3	6	[9]
(Austria) O Marach (Australia) L Saville	6	3	[11]
(Russia) K Khachanov (Russia) A Rublev	6	6
6	(Netherlands) W Koolhof (Poland) Ł Kubot	4	2

Second round
1	(Colombia) JS Cabal (Colombia) R Farah	6^{7}	6^{4}
(El Salvador) M Arévalo (Romania) H Tecău	7^{9}	7^{7}
(United Kingdom) D Evans (United Kingdom) N Skupski	5	7^{7}	[10]
5	(United Kingdom) J Murray (Brazil) B Soares	7	6^{4}	[7]
4	(Croatia) I Dodig (Slovakia) F Polášek	7	6
(Canada) F Auger-Aliassime (Poland) H Hurkacz	5	4
(Austria) O Marach (Australia) L Saville	w/o
(Russia) K Khachanov (Russia) A Rublev

Quarterfinals
(El Salvador) M Arévalo (Romania) H Tecău	7^{8}	3	[9]
(United Kingdom) D Evans (United Kingdom) N Skupski	6^{6}	6	[11]
4	(Croatia) I Dodig (Slovakia) F Polášek	7^{7}	6
(Austria) O Marach (Australia) L Saville	6^{4}	4

Semifinals
(United Kingdom) D Evans (United Kingdom) N Skupski	7^{7}	1	[10]
4	(Croatia) I Dodig (Slovakia) F Polášek	6^{4}	6	[8]

=== Bottom half ===
First round
7	(United States) R Ram (United Kingdom) J Salisbury	6	7^{7}
(United States) A Krajicek (Croatia) F Škugor	2	6^{5}
(South Africa) R Klaasen (Japan) B McLachlan	3	4
Alt	(Brazil) M Demoliner (Mexico) S González	6	6
WC	(United States) S Korda (United States) M Mmoh	6	2	[10]
(Italy) F Fognini (Argentina) M González	3	6	[7]
(Germany) T Pütz (Germany) A Zverev	6	6
3	(Spain) M Granollers (Argentina) H Zeballos	2	4
8	(France) P-H Herbert (France) N Mahut	6	6
(India) R Bopanna (France) B Paire	3	2
(Brazil) M Melo (Netherlands) J-J Rojer	7^{7}	3	[4]
(Serbia) M Kecmanović (Pakistan) A-u-H Qureshi	6^{5}	6	[10]
(United States) T Fritz (United States) J Isner	7	6
(Kazakhstan) A Bublik (France) A Mannarino	5	3
WC	(United States) S Johnson (United States) S Querrey	6^{2}	4
2	(Croatia) N Mektić (Croatia) M Pavić	7^{7}	6

Second round
7	(United States) R Ram (United Kingdom) J Salisbury	4	6	[10]
Alt	(Brazil) M Demoliner (Mexico) S González	6	4	[2]
WC	(United States) S Korda (United States) M Mmoh	7^{7}	6^{1}	[10]
(Germany) T Pütz (Germany) A Zverev	6^{5}	7^{7}	[6]
8	(France) P-H Herbert (France) N Mahut	6	4	[3]
(Serbia) M Kecmanović (Pakistan) A-u-H Qureshi	4	6	[10]
(United States) T Fritz (United States) J Isner	4	4
2	(Croatia) N Mektić (Croatia) M Pavić	6	6

Quarterfinals
7	(United States) R Ram (United Kingdom) J Salisbury	7	6
WC	(United States) S Korda (United States) M Mmoh	5	2
(Serbia) M Kecmanović (Pakistan) A-u-H Qureshi	2	2
2	(Croatia) N Mektić (Croatia) M Pavić	6	6

Semifinals
7	(United States) R Ram (United Kingdom) J Salisbury	3	6^{5}
2	(Croatia) N Mektić (Croatia) M Pavić	6	7^{7}
