= 2019 Miami Open – Men's doubles =

Men's doubles
- 2019 Miami Open

Final
- Champions: (United States) Bob Bryan (United States) Mike Bryan
- Runners-up: (Netherlands) Wesley Koolhof (Greece) Stefanos Tsitsipas
- Score: 7–5, 7–6^{(10–8)}

Events
| Singles | men | women |
| Doubles | men | women |
| ← 2018 · | Miami Open | · 2021 → |

Bob and Mike Bryan were the defending champions, and successfully defended the title, defeating Wesley Koolhof and Stefanos Tsitsipas in the final, 7–5, 7–6^{(10–8)}. This was their last Masters title.

== Seeds ==
1. (Poland) Łukasz Kubot / (Brazil) Marcelo Melo (semifinals)
2. (United Kingdom) Jamie Murray / (Brazil) Bruno Soares (second round)
3. (United States) Bob Bryan / (United States) Mike Bryan (champions)
4. (Colombia) Juan Sebastián Cabal / (Colombia) Robert Farah (second round)
5. (Austria) Oliver Marach / (Croatia) Mate Pavić (quarterfinals)
6. (South Africa) Raven Klaasen / (New Zealand) Michael Venus (first round)
7. (Spain) Marcel Granollers / (Croatia) Nikola Mektić (second round)
8. (Finland) Henri Kontinen / (Australia) John Peers (first round)

== Draw ==
=== Key ===
- Q = Qualifier
- WC = Wild card
- LL = Lucky loser
- Alt = Alternate
- SE = Special exempt
- PR = Protected ranking
- ITF = ITF entry
- JE = Junior exempt
- w/o = Walkover
- r = Retired
- d = Defaulted
- SR = Special ranking

=== Finals ===
Semifinals
1 | (Poland) Łukasz Kubot (Brazil) Marcelo Melo | 6^{7} | 7^{10} | [12]
3 | (United States) Bob Bryan (United States) Mike Bryan | 7^{9} | 6^{8} | [14]
(Croatia) Ivan Dodig (France) Édouard Roger-Vasselin | 3 | 7^{7} | [8]
(Netherlands) Wesley Koolhof (Greece) Stefanos Tsitsipas | 6 | 6^{2} | [10]

Final
3 | (United States) Bob Bryan (United States) Mike Bryan | 7 | 7^{10}
(Netherlands) Wesley Koolhof (Greece) Stefanos Tsitsipas | 5 | 6^{8}

=== Top half ===
First round
1 | (Poland) Ł Kubot (Brazil) M Melo | 6 | 6
(Italy) M Cecchinato (Argentina) A Molteni | 2 | 2
(Argentina) G Pella (Portugal) J Sousa | 7^{7} | 6^{3} | [10]
WC | (United States) T Fritz (Australia) N Kyrgios | 6^{4} | 7^{7} | [8]
(Moldova) R Albot (Georgia (country)) N Basilashvili | 6 | 6
(Japan) B McLachlan (United Kingdom) N Skupski | 2 | 4
(Netherlands) J-J Rojer (Romania) H Tecău | 7^{7} | 3 | [10]
5 | (Austria) O Marach (Croatia) M Pavić | 6^{5} | 6 | [12]
3 | (United States) B Bryan (United States) M Bryan | 6 | 6
(Hungary) M Fucsovics (Czech Republic) R Jebavý | 1 | 4
(France) J Chardy (France) G Simon | 4 | 6 | [6]
(Chile) N Jarry (Croatia) F Škugor | 6 | 1 | [10]
(India) R Bopanna (Canada) D Shapovalov | 7 | 2 | [10]
(United States) A Krajicek (New Zealand) A Sitak | 5 | 6 | [6]
(United States) S Johnson (Austria) D Thiem | 6^{4} | 5
7 | (Spain) M Granollers (Croatia) N Mektić | 7^{7} | 7

Second round
1 | (Poland) Ł Kubot (Brazil) M Melo | 7 | 6
(Argentina) G Pella (Portugal) J Sousa | 5 | 3
(Moldova) R Albot (Georgia (country)) N Basilashvili | 1 | 1
5 | (Austria) O Marach (Croatia) M Pavić | 6 | 6
3 | (United States) B Bryan (United States) M Bryan | 6 | 6^{6} | [10]
(Chile) N Jarry (Croatia) F Škugor | 1 | 7^{8} | [3]
(India) R Bopanna (Canada) D Shapovalov | 6 | 6
7 | (Spain) M Granollers (Croatia) N Mektić | 1 | 2

Quarterfinals
1 | (Poland) Ł Kubot (Brazil) M Melo | 7^{7} | 7
5 | (Austria) O Marach (Croatia) M Pavić | 6^{5} | 5
3 | (United States) B Bryan (United States) M Bryan | 6 | 6
(India) R Bopanna (Canada) D Shapovalov | 3 | 4

Semifinals
1 | (Poland) Łukasz Kubot (Brazil) Marcelo Melo | 6^{7} | 7^{10} | [12]
3 | (United States) Bob Bryan (United States) Mike Bryan | 7^{9} | 6^{8} | [14]

=== Bottom half ===
First round
6 | (South Africa) R Klaasen (New Zealand) M Venus | 4 | 3
(Netherlands) M Middelkoop (Argentina) D Schwartzman | 6 | 6
(Spain) F López (Spain) M López | 6^{5} | 0
(Croatia) I Dodig (France) É Roger-Vasselin | 7^{7} | 6
(Germany) A Zverev (Germany) M Zverev | 4 | 2
(Argentina) M González (Argentina) H Zeballos | 6 | 6
(Netherlands) R Haase (United Kingdom) D Inglot | 1 | 6 | [4]
4 | (Colombia) JS Cabal (Colombia) R Farah | 6 | 3 | [10]
8 | (Finland) H Kontinen (Australia) J Peers | 7^{7} | 5 | [9]
(United States) R Ram (United Kingdom) J Salisbury | 6^{2} | 7 | [11]
WC | (Brazil) M Demoliner (Serbia) M Kecmanović | 3 | 4
(United States) J Isner (United States) S Querrey | 6 | 6
(Russia) K Khachanov (Russia) D Medvedev | 1 | 4
(Netherlands) W Koolhof (Greece) S Tsitsipas | 6 | 6
WC | (United States) M McDonald (United States) R Opelka | 5 | 6^{1}
2 | (United Kingdom) J Murray (Brazil) B Soares | 7 | 7^{7}

Second round
(Netherlands) M Middelkoop (Argentina) D Schwartzman | 4 | 3
(Croatia) I Dodig (France) É Roger-Vasselin | 6 | 6
(Argentina) M González (Argentina) H Zeballos | 6 | 3 | [10]
4 | (Colombia) JS Cabal (Colombia) R Farah | 4 | 6 | [7]
(United States) R Ram (United Kingdom) J Salisbury | 7 | 6^{2} | [7]
(United States) J Isner (United States) S Querrey | 5 | 7^{7} | [10]
(Netherlands) W Koolhof (Greece) S Tsitsipas | 6 | 4 | [10]
2 | (United Kingdom) J Murray (Brazil) B Soares | 3 | 6 | [7]

Quarterfinals
(Croatia) I Dodig (France) É Roger-Vasselin | 6 | 7^{8}
(Argentina) M González (Argentina) H Zeballos | 3 | 6^{6}
(United States) J Isner (United States) S Querrey | 4 | 7 | [8]
(Netherlands) W Koolhof (Greece) S Tsitsipas | 6 | 5 | [10]

Semifinals
(Croatia) I Dodig (France) É Roger-Vasselin | 3 | 7^{7} | [8]
(Netherlands) W Koolhof (Greece) S Tsitsipas | 6 | 6^{2} | [10]
