= 2019 Miami Open – Women's singles =

Women's singles
- 2019 Miami Open

Final
- Champion: (Australia) Ashleigh Barty
- Runner-up: (Czech Republic) Karolína Plíšková
- Score: 7–6^{(7–1)}, 6–3

Events
Singles	men	women
Doubles	men	women
← 2018 ·	Miami Open	· 2021 →

Ashleigh Barty defeated Karolína Plíšková in the final, 7–6^{(7–1)}, 6–3 to win the women's singles tennis title at the 2019 Miami Open. It was Barty's first WTA Premier Mandatory title. She entered the top 10 in the WTA rankings for the first time with the win.

Sloane Stephens was the defending champion, but lost in the third round to Tatjana Maria.

Naomi Osaka retained the WTA No. 1 singles ranking after Simona Halep lost in the semifinals. Petra Kvitová, Angelique Kerber, and Elina Svitolina were also in contention for the top ranking.

== Seeds ==
All seeds received a bye into the second round.

1. (Japan) Naomi Osaka (third round)
2. (Romania) Simona Halep (semifinals)
3. (Czech Republic) Petra Kvitová (quarterfinals)
4. (United States) Sloane Stephens (third round)
5. (Czech Republic) Karolína Plíšková (final)
6. (Ukraine) Elina Svitolina (second round)
7. (Netherlands) Kiki Bertens (fourth round)
8. (Germany) Angelique Kerber (third round)
9. (Belarus) Aryna Sabalenka (second round)
10. (United States) Serena Williams (third round, withdrew)
11. (Latvia) Anastasija Sevastova (third round)
12. (Australia) Ashleigh Barty (champion)
13. (Denmark) Caroline Wozniacki (fourth round)
14. (Russia) Daria Kasatkina (third round)
15. (Germany) Julia Görges (third round)
16. (Belgium) Elise Mertens (third round)

17. (United States) Madison Keys (second round)
18. (China) Wang Qiang (quarterfinals)
19. (France) Caroline Garcia (fourth round)
20. (Spain) Garbiñe Muguruza (second round)
21. (Estonia) Anett Kontaveit (semifinals)
22. (Latvia) Jeļena Ostapenko (second round)
23. (Switzerland) Belinda Bencic (second round)
24. (Spain) Carla Suárez Navarro (second round)
25. (United States) Danielle Collins (third round)
26. (Croatia) Donna Vekić (third round)
27. (Chinese Taipei) Hsieh Su-wei (quarterfinals)
28. (Ukraine) Lesia Tsurenko (withdrew)
29. (Italy) Camila Giorgi (second round)
30. (Romania) Mihaela Buzărnescu (second round)
31. (Russia) Anastasia Pavlyuchenkova (second round)
32. (United States) Sofia Kenin (second round)

Click on the seed number of a player to go to their draw section.

== Draw ==
=== Key ===
- Q = Qualifier
- WC = Wild card
- LL = Lucky loser
- Alt = Alternate
- SE = Special exempt
- PR = Protected ranking
- ITF = ITF entry
- JE = Junior exempt
- w/o = Walkover
- r = Retired
- d = Defaulted
- SR = Special ranking

=== Finals ===
Quarterfinals
27	(Chinese Taipei) Hsieh Su-wei	6	2	5
21	(Estonia) Anett Kontaveit	3	6	7
3	(Czech Republic) Petra Kvitová	6^{6}	6	2
12	(Australia) Ashleigh Barty	7^{8}	3	6
5	(Czech Republic) Karolína Plíšková	6	6
(Czech Republic) Markéta Vondroušová	3	4
18	(China) Wang Qiang	4	5
2	(Romania) Simona Halep	6	7

Semifinals
21	(Estonia) Anett Kontaveit	3	3
12	(Australia) Ashleigh Barty	6	6
5	(Czech Republic) Karolína Plíšková	7	6
2	(Romania) Simona Halep	5	1

Final
12	(Australia) Ashleigh Barty	7^{7}	6
5	(Czech Republic) Karolína Plíšková	6^{1}	3

=== Top half ===
==== Section 1 ====
First round
Q	(United States) S Vickery	6	3	1
Q	(Belgium) Y Wickmayer	3	6	6
Q	(Estonia) K Kanepi	2	2
(United States) A Riske	6	6
Q	(Romania) M Niculescu	6	6
(Slovenia) T Zidanšek	1	2
Q	(Switzerland) V Golubic	6	5	4
(Belarus) A Sasnovich	4	7	6

Second round
1	(Japan) N Osaka	6	6^{3}	6
Q	(Belgium) Y Wickmayer	0	7^{7}	1
(United States) A Riske	2	5
27	(Chinese Taipei) S-w Hsieh	6	7
20	(Spain) G Muguruza	6^{0}	6	2
Q	(Romania) M Niculescu	7^{7}	4	6
(Belarus) A Sasnovich	4	4
13	(Denmark) C Wozniacki	6	6

Third round
1	(Japan) N Osaka	6	6^{4}	3
27	(Chinese Taipei) S-w Hsieh	4	7^{7}	6
Q	(Romania) M Niculescu	4	6^{4}
13	(Denmark) C Wozniacki	6	7^{7}

Fourth round
27	(Chinese Taipei) S-w Hsieh	6	6^{0}	6
13	(Denmark) C Wozniacki	3	7^{7}	2

==== Section 2 ====
First round
(Australia) A Tomljanović	4	6	6
PR	(Germany) A-L Friedsam	6	3	0
(Germany) A Petkovic	4	3
(United States) A Anisimova	6	6
(Romania) I-C Begu	6	6^{2}	2
(Canada) B Andreescu	4	7^{7}	6
Q	(Czech Republic) K Muchová	6	6
Q	(Japan) N Hibino	3	3

Second round
9	(Belarus) A Sabalenka	3	4
(Australia) A Tomljanović	6	6
(United States) A Anisimova	3	6	4
21	(Estonia) A Kontaveit	6	1	6
32	(United States) S Kenin	3	3
(Canada) B Andreescu	6	6
Q	(Czech Republic) K Muchová	6	3	3
8	(Germany) A Kerber	3	6	6

Third round
(Australia) A Tomljanović	6^{3}	6	6^{4}
21	(Estonia) A Kontaveit	7^{7}	2	7^{7}
(Canada) B Andreescu	6	4	6
8	(Germany) A Kerber	4	6	1

Fourth round
21	(Estonia) A Kontaveit	6	2
(Canada) B Andreescu	1	0^{r}

==== Section 3 ====
First round
WC	(Serbia) O Danilović	6	3	4
(Greece) M Sakkari	1	6	6
(Spain) S Sorribes Tormo	6	4	6
(Serbia) A Krunić	3	6	0
(Belarus) V Azarenka	6	3	6
(Slovakia) D Cibulková	2	6	4
WC	(Russia) N Vikhlyantseva	6	5	6^{4}
(Slovakia) M Rybáriková	1	7	7^{7}

Second round
3	(Czech Republic) P Kvitová	6	6
(Greece) M Sakkari	1	4
(Spain) S Sorribes Tormo	3	3
26	(Croatia) D Vekić	6	6
19	(France) C Garcia	6	6
(Belarus) V Azarenka	3	4
(Slovakia) M Rybáriková	4	5
15	(Germany) J Görges	6	7

Third round
3	(Czech Republic) P Kvitová	6	3	6
26	(Croatia) D Vekić	4	6	4
19	(France) C Garcia	6	7
15	(Germany) J Görges	0	5

Fourth round
3	(Czech Republic) P Kvitová	6	6
19	(France) C Garcia	3	3

==== Section 4 ====
First round
(Russia) E Alexandrova	3	2
(Ukraine) D Yastremska	6	6
(Russia) E Rodina	4	2
(Australia) S Stosur	6	6
(Slovakia) V Kužmová	6	6
(Australia) D Gavrilova	4	2
WC	(China) Xiy Wang	6	6
(Puerto Rico) M Puig	3	1

Second round
12	(Australia) A Barty	6	6
(Ukraine) D Yastremska	4	1
(Australia) S Stosur	6	4	6
17	(United States) M Keys	4	6	4
31	(Russia) A Pavlyuchenkova	7^{7}	4	5
(Slovakia) V Kužmová	6^{5}	6	7
WC	(China) Xiy Wang	4	1
7	(Netherlands) K Bertens	6	6

Third round
12	(Australia) A Barty	6	6
(Australia) S Stosur	0	3
(Slovakia) V Kužmová	6	0	1
7	(Netherlands) K Bertens	3	6	6

Fourth round
12	(Australia) A Barty	4	6	6
7	(Netherlands) K Bertens	6	3	2

=== Bottom half ===
==== Section 5 ====
First round
(China) S Zhang	2	1
(Croatia) P Martić	6	6
(Belarus) V Lapko	5	7^{9}	1
(France) A Cornet	7	6^{7}	6
(Kazakhstan) Y Putintseva	4	6	7
(Belgium) K Flipkens	6	4	5
(China) S Zheng	3	1
(Czech Republic) K Siniaková	6	6

Second round
5	(Czech Republic) Ka Plíšková	6	6
(Croatia) P Martić	3	4
(France) A Cornet	7^{9}	6
30	(Romania) M Buzărnescu	6^{7}	1
23	(Switzerland) B Bencic	3	5
(Kazakhstan) Y Putintseva	6	7
(Czech Republic) K Siniaková	2	6	4
11	(Latvia) A Sevastova	6	0	6

Third round
5	(Czech Republic) Ka Plíšková	6^{3}	6	6
(France) A Cornet	7^{7}	1	4
(Kazakhstan) Y Putintseva	1	6	6
11	(Latvia) A Sevastova	6	2	3

Fourth round
5	(Czech Republic) Ka Plíšková	2	6	7
(Kazakhstan) Y Putintseva	6	3	5

==== Section 6 ====
First round
(France) P Parmentier	4	6	7^{7}
(Russia) M Gasparyan	6	1	6^{4}
(Czech Republic) M Vondroušová	6	6
(Czech Republic) B Strýcová	3	2
(Slovakia) AK Schmiedlová	4	1
(Germany) T Maria	6	6
(Tunisia) O Jabeur	2	6	6
LL	(Czech Republic) Kr Plíšková	6	3	4

Second round
16	(Belgium) E Mertens	6	7
(France) P Parmentier	2	5
(Czech Republic) M Vondroušová	7	6
22	(Latvia) J Ostapenko	5	1
29	(Italy) C Giorgi	3	4
(Germany) T Maria	6	6
(Tunisia) O Jabeur	2	3
4	(United States) S Stephens	6	6

Third round
16	(Belgium) E Mertens	4	6^{1}
(Czech Republic) M Vondroušová	6	7^{7}
(Germany) T Maria	6	6
4	(United States) S Stephens	3	2

Fourth round
(Czech Republic) M Vondroušová	6	6
(Germany) T Maria	4	3

==== Section 7 ====
First round
(China) Y Wang	6	6
(France) K Mladenovic	3	3
WC	(United States) W Osuigwe	6	6
WC	(Japan) M Osaka	2	4
(United Kingdom) J Konta	6	6
Q	(United States) J Pegula	1	4
(Sweden) R Peterson	6	5	7
Q	(Germany) L Siegemund	1	7	5

Second round
6	(Ukraine) E Svitolina	2	4
(China) Y Wang	6	6
WC	(United States) W Osuigwe	6^{5}	0
25	(United States) D Collins	7^{7}	6
18	(China) Q Wang	6	6
(United Kingdom) J Konta	4	0
(Sweden) R Peterson	3	6	1
10	(United States) S Williams	6	1	6

Third round
(China) Y Wang	7	6
25	(United States) D Collins	5	1
18	(China) Q Wang	w/o
10	(United States) S Williams

Fourth round
(China) Y Wang	5	4
18	(China) Q Wang	7	6

==== Section 8 ====
First round
WC	(United States) C Gauff	3	6	6
WC	(United States) C McNally	6	3	4
Q	(Slovenia) D Jakupović	5	3
(United States) V Williams	7	6
WC	(China) Xin Wang	2	6	3
Q	(Japan) M Doi	6	1	6
Q	(United States) T Townsend	6	6
(Sweden) J Larsson	1	2

Second round
14	(Russia) D Kasatkina	6	6
WC	(United States) C Gauff	3	2
(United States) V Williams	7^{7}	6
24	(Spain) C Suárez Navarro	6^{4}	1
LL	(Slovenia) P Hercog	7^{7}	6
Q	(Japan) M Doi	6^{4}	4
Q	(United States) T Townsend	1	3
2	(Romania) S Halep	6	6

Third round
14	(Russia) D Kasatkina	3	1
(United States) V Williams	6	6
LL	(Slovenia) P Hercog	7	6^{1}	2
2	(Romania) S Halep	5	7^{7}	6

Fourth round
(United States) V Williams	3	3
2	(Romania) S Halep	6	6

== Qualifying ==
=== Seeds ===
1. (Russia) Anastasia Potapova (first round)
2. (Canada) Eugenie Bouchard (first round)
3. (Slovenia) Dalila Jakupović (qualified)
4. (Switzerland) Viktorija Golubic (qualified)
5. (United States) Jennifer Brady (first round)
6. (United Kingdom) Katie Boulter (first round)
7. (Estonia) Kaia Kanepi (qualified)
8. (United States) Bernarda Pera (first round, retired)
9. (Spain) Lara Arruabarrena (first round)
10. (United States) Taylor Townsend (qualified)
11. (Czech Republic) Kristýna Plíšková (qualifying competition, lucky loser)
12. (Slovenia) Polona Hercog (qualifying competition, lucky loser)
13. (Poland) Magda Linette (qualifying competition)
14. (United States) Jessica Pegula (qualified)
15. (Kazakhstan) Zarina Diyas (first round)
16. (China) Zhu Lin (first round)
17. (United States) Madison Brengle (qualifying competition)
18. (Germany) Mona Barthel (qualifying competition)
19. (Romania) Sorana Cîrstea (first round)
20. (Luxembourg) Mandy Minella (qualifying competition)
21. (Russia) Veronika Kudermetova (first round)
22. (Russia) Vitalia Diatchenko (first round)
23. (Hungary) Tímea Babos (qualifying competition)
24. (Russia) Anna Blinkova (first round)

=== Qualifiers ===
1. (Japan) Misaki Doi
2. (Japan) Nao Hibino
3. (Slovenia) Dalila Jakupović
4. (Switzerland) Viktorija Golubic
5. (United States) Sachia Vickery
6. (Czech Republic) Karolína Muchová
7. (Estonia) Kaia Kanepi
8. (United States) Jessica Pegula
9. (Romania) Monica Niculescu
10. (United States) Taylor Townsend
11. (Belgium) Yanina Wickmayer
12. (Germany) Laura Siegemund

=== Lucky losers ===
1. (Czech Republic) Kristýna Plíšková
2. (Slovenia) Polona Hercog

=== Qualifying draw ===
==== First qualifier ====
First round
1	(Russia) Anastasia Potapova	6	6^{10}	6^{2}
(Japan) Misaki Doi	3	7^{12}	7^{7}
WC	(United States) Christina McHale	6	6^{3}	4
20	(Luxembourg) Mandy Minella	2	7^{7}	6

Qualifying competition
(Japan) Misaki Doi	3	7	6
20	(Luxembourg) Mandy Minella	6	5	4

==== Second qualifier ====
First round
2	(Canada) Eugenie Bouchard	6	0	4
(Japan) Nao Hibino	4	6	6
WC	(United States) Caroline Dolehide	5	6^{5}
13	(Poland) Magda Linette	7	7^{7}

Qualifying competition
(Japan) Nao Hibino	6	6
13	(Poland) Magda Linette	4	0

==== Third qualifier ====
First round
3	(Slovenia) Dalila Jakupović	1	6	6
(France) Fiona Ferro	6	3	2
(United Kingdom) Heather Watson	7^{7}	3	4
17	(United States) Madison Brengle	6^{2}	6	6

Qualifying competition
3	(Slovenia) Dalila Jakupović	6	6
17	(United States) Madison Brengle	0	3

==== Fourth qualifier ====
First round
4	(Switzerland) Viktorija Golubic	6	3
WC	(India) Karman Thandi	0	0^{r}
(United Kingdom) Harriet Dart	6	4	6^{5}
18	(Germany) Mona Barthel	3	6	7^{7}

Qualifying competition
4	(Switzerland) Viktorija Golubic	7	7
18	(Germany) Mona Barthel	5	5

==== Fifth qualifier ====
First round
5	(United States) Jennifer Brady	6	3	2
(United States) Sachia Vickery	2	6	6
(Poland) Iga Świątek	6	7
15	(Kazakhstan) Zarina Diyas	2	5

Qualifying competition
(United States) Sachia Vickery	7^{7}	6
(Poland) Iga Świątek	6^{2}	4

==== Sixth qualifier ====
First round
6	(United Kingdom) Katie Boulter	4	2
(Czech Republic) Marie Bouzková	6	6
(Czech Republic) Karolína Muchová	7^{8}	6
22	(Russia) Vitalia Diatchenko	6^{6}	1

Qualifying competition
(Czech Republic) Marie Bouzková	4	3
(Czech Republic) Karolína Muchová	6	6

==== Seventh qualifier ====
First round
7	(Estonia) Kaia Kanepi	6	6
(Spain) Paula Badosa Gibert	3	3
(Switzerland) Stefanie Vögele	6	5	4
23	(Hungary) Tímea Babos	3	7	6

Qualifying competition
7	(Estonia) Kaia Kanepi	6	6
23	(Hungary) Tímea Babos	3	4

==== Eighth qualifier ====
First round
8	(United States) Bernarda Pera	3	0^{r}
(Netherlands) Arantxa Rus	6	3
WC	(United States) Allie Kiick	5	0
14	(United States) Jessica Pegula	7	6

Qualifying competition
(Netherlands) Arantxa Rus	3	0
14	(United States) Jessica Pegula	6	6

==== Ninth qualifier ====
First round
9	(Spain) Lara Arruabarrena	0	6	4
(Romania) Monica Niculescu	6	2	6
(Ukraine) Kateryna Kozlova	0	6	6
16	(China) Zhu Lin	6	4	2

Qualifying competition
(Romania) Monica Niculescu	6	6
(Ukraine) Kateryna Kozlova	2	4

==== Tenth qualifier ====
First round
10	(United States) Taylor Townsend	4	7	6
WC	(China) Zheng Qinwen	6	5	4
WC	(Brazil) Beatriz Haddad Maia	2	6	6
24	(Russia) Anna Blinkova	6	3	2

Qualifying competition
10	(United States) Taylor Townsend	6	6
WC	(Brazil) Beatriz Haddad Maia	1	4

==== Eleventh qualifier ====
First round
11	(Czech Republic) Kristýna Plíšková	6	1	7
(Romania) Ana Bogdan	4	6	5
(Belgium) Yanina Wickmayer	6	6
21	(Russia) Veronika Kudermetova	4	2

Qualifying competition
11	(Czech Republic) Kristýna Plíšková	3	3
(Belgium) Yanina Wickmayer	6	6

==== Twelfth qualifier ====
First round
12	(Slovenia) Polona Hercog	6	6
(Hungary) Fanny Stollár	2	2
(Germany) Laura Siegemund	4	7	7
19	(Romania) Sorana Cîrstea	6	5	5

Qualifying competition
12	(Slovenia) Polona Hercog	6	2	2
(Germany) Laura Siegemund	3	6	6
