= 2019 Miami Open – Men's singles =

Men's singles
- 2019 Miami Open

Final
- Champion: (Switzerland) Roger Federer
- Runner-up: (United States) John Isner
- Score: 6–1, 6–4

Details
- Draw: 96 (12 Q / 5 WC )
- Seeds: 32

Events
Singles	men	women
Doubles	men	women
- Miami Open

Roger Federer defeated the defending champion John Isner in the final, 6–1, 6–4 to win the men's singles tennis title at the 2019 Miami Open. It was his fourth Miami Open title, his 28th and final Masters singles title, and his 101st career singles title overall. Federer became the oldest Masters 1000 champion, at 37 years, 7 months and 23 days old, since the series was established in 1990.

Félix Auger-Aliassime became the youngest men's singles semifinalist in the tournament's 35-year history, and the first teenage semifinalist since Andy Murray and Novak Djokovic in 2007.

== Seeds ==
All seeds received a bye into the second round.

1. (Serbia) Novak Djokovic (fourth round)
2. (Germany) Alexander Zverev (second round)
3. (Austria) Dominic Thiem (second round)
4. (Switzerland) Roger Federer (champion)
5. (Japan) Kei Nishikori (second round)
6. (South Africa) Kevin Anderson (quarterfinals)
7. (United States) John Isner (final)
8. (Greece) Stefanos Tsitsipas (fourth round)
9. (Croatia) Marin Čilić (second round)
10. (Russia) Karen Khachanov (second round)
11. (Croatia) Borna Ćorić (quarterfinals)
12. (Canada) Milos Raonic (third round)
13. (Russia) Daniil Medvedev (fourth round)
14. (Italy) Marco Cecchinato (third round)
15. (Italy) Fabio Fognini (third round)
16. (France) ~~Gaël Monfils~~ (withdrew)

17. (Georgia (country)) Nikoloz Basilashvili (fourth round)
18. (Belgium) David Goffin (fourth round)
19. (United Kingdom) Kyle Edmund (fourth round)
20. (Canada) Denis Shapovalov (semifinals)
21. (Argentina) Diego Schwartzman (second round)
22. (Spain) Roberto Bautista Agut (quarterfinals)
23. (France) Gilles Simon (second round)
24. (Bulgaria) Grigor Dimitrov (third round)
25. (France) Lucas Pouille (second round)
26. (Argentina) Guido Pella (second round)
27. (Australia) Nick Kyrgios (fourth round)
28. (United States) Frances Tiafoe (quarterfinals)
29. (Hungary) Márton Fucsovics (second round)
30. (Switzerland) Stan Wawrinka (second round)
31. (United States) Steve Johnson (second round)
32. (Australia) John Millman (second round)

Click on the seed number of a player to go to their draw section.

== Draw ==
Key

- Q = Qualifier
- WC = Wild card
- LL = Lucky loser
- Alt = Alternate
- ITF = ITF entry
- PR = Protected ranking
- SR = Special ranking
- SE = Special exempt
- JE = Junior exempt
- JR = Junior Accelerator Programme entrant
- CO = College Accelerator Programme entrant
- NG = Next Gen Accelerator Program entrant
- w/o = Walkover
- r = Retired
- d = Defaulted

=== Finals ===
Quarterfinals
22	(Spain) Roberto Bautista Agut	6^{1}	6^{5}
7	(United States) John Isner	7^{7}	7^{7}
Q	(Canada) Félix Auger-Aliassime	7^{7}	6
11	(Croatia) Borna Ćorić	6^{3}	2
6	(South Africa) Kevin Anderson	0	4
4	(Switzerland) Roger Federer	6	6
20	(Canada) Denis Shapovalov	6^{5}	6	6
28	(United States) Frances Tiafoe	7^{7}	4	2

Semifinals
7	(United States) John Isner	7^{7}	7^{7}
Q	(Canada) Félix Auger-Aliassime	6^{3}	6^{4}
4	(Switzerland) Roger Federer	6	6
20	(Canada) Denis Shapovalov	2	4

Final
7	(United States) John Isner	1	4
4	(Switzerland) Roger Federer	6	6

=== Top half ===
==== Section 1 ====
First round
(Australia) B Tomic	6	6
Q	(Brazil) T Monteiro	4	1
(Germany) P Gojowczyk	4	2
(Argentina) F Delbonis	6	6
PR	(Serbia) J Tipsarević	6	6
(United States) B Klahn	3	3
(Kazakhstan) M Kukushkin	6^{3}	4
(Argentina) G Andreozzi	7^{7}	6

Second round
1	(Serbia) N Djokovic	7^{7}	6
(Australia) B Tomic	6^{2}	2
(Argentina) F Delbonis	7	3	7^{7}
32	(Australia) J Millman	5	6	6^{2}
22	(Spain) R Bautista Agut	7^{7}	6
PR	(Serbia) J Tipsarević	6^{3}	4
(Argentina) G Andreozzi	7	4	4
15	(Italy) F Fognini	5	6	6

Third round
1	(Serbia) N Djokovic	7	4	6
(Argentina) F Delbonis	5	6	1
22	(Spain) R Bautista Agut	6	6
15	(Italy) F Fognini	4	4

Fourth round
1	(Serbia) N Djokovic	6	5	3
22	(Spain) R Bautista Agut	1	7	6

==== Section 2 ====
First round
(Germany) M Marterer	6	3	6
(United States) T Fritz	4	6	3
(Italy) T Fabbiano	4	6	3
(Belarus) I Ivashka	6	1	6
(Romania) M Copil	4	2
(Spain) A Ramos Viñolas	6	6
(Slovakia) M Kližan	4	3
Q	(Italy) L Sonego	6	6

Second round
12	(Canada) M Raonic	w/o
(Germany) M Marterer
(Belarus) I Ivashka	3	2
19	(United Kingdom) K Edmund	6	6
25	(France) L Pouille	6	4	3
(Spain) A Ramos Viñolas	4	6	6
Q	(Italy) L Sonego	6^{2}	6^{7}
7	(United States) J Isner	7^{7}	7^{9}

Third round
12	(Canada) M Raonic	4	4
19	(United Kingdom) K Edmund	6	6
(Spain) A Ramos Viñolas	5	6^{6}
7	(United States) J Isner	7	7^{8}

Fourth round
19	(United Kingdom) K Edmund	6^{5}	6^{3}
7	(United States) J Isner	7^{7}	7^{7}

==== Section 3 ====
First round
(Italy) M Berrettini	4	3
(Poland) H Hurkacz	6	6
Q	(Canada) F Auger-Aliassime	3	6	6
Q	(Norway) C Ruud	6	1	2
WC	(Spain) N Kuhn	6	5	2^{r}
(Germany) M Zverev	4	7	2
(Netherlands) R Haase	6	6
Q	(Slovakia) L Lacko	2	4

Second round
3	(Austria) D Thiem	4	4
(Poland) H Hurkacz	6	6
Q	(Canada) F Auger-Aliassime	6	4	6
29	(Hungary) M Fucsovics	4	6	0
17	(Georgia (country)) N Basilashvili	6	6
(Germany) M Zverev	3	2
(Netherlands) R Haase	3	6	6
LL	(South Africa) L Harris	6	3	4

Third round
(Poland) H Hurkacz	6^{5}	4
Q	(Canada) F Auger-Aliassime	7^{7}	6
17	(Georgia (country)) N Basilashvili	7^{7}	6
(Netherlands) R Haase	6^{3}	3

Fourth round
Q	(Canada) F Auger-Aliassime	7^{7}	6
17	(Georgia (country)) N Basilashvili	6^{4}	4

==== Section 4 ====
First round
(Spain) R Carballés Baena	6	6
(United States) D Kudla	1	2
(France) J Chardy	6^{1}	6	7^{7}
(Chile) N Jarry	7^{7}	2	6^{5}
(United States) T Sandgren	7	4	6^{5}
Q	(Kazakhstan) A Bublik	5	6	7^{7}
(Serbia) D Lajović	6	6^{6}	6
Q	(Uruguay) P Cuevas	4	7^{8}	3

Second round
11	(Croatia) B Ćorić	7^{9}	0	6
(Spain) R Carballés Baena	6^{7}	6	2
(France) J Chardy	6	6
23	(France) G Simon	4	2
27	(Australia) N Kyrgios	7	6
Q	(Kazakhstan) A Bublik	5	3
(Serbia) D Lajović	2	6	6
5	(Japan) K Nishikori	6	2	3

Third round
11	(Croatia) B Ćorić	6^{2}	6	6
(France) J Chardy	7^{7}	2	3
27	(Australia) N Kyrgios	6	6
(Serbia) D Lajović	3	1

Fourth round
11	(Croatia) B Ćorić	4	6	6
27	(Australia) N Kyrgios	6	3	2

=== Bottom half ===
==== Section 5 ====
First round
(Spain) J Munar	7^{7}	6
Q	(India) P Gunneswaran	6^{3}	4
(Portugal) J Sousa	6	7
WC	(Chinese Taipei) C-h Tseng	4	5
(Spain) F López	7	4	6
(France) B Paire	5	6	4
(United Kingdom) C Norrie	6	6^{5}	3
(Australia) J Thompson	4	7^{7}	6

Second round
6	(South Africa) K Anderson	6	3	6
(Spain) J Munar	4	6	3
(Portugal) J Sousa	7^{8}	6
31	(United States) S Johnson	6^{6}	4
24	(Bulgaria) G Dimitrov	6	6
(Spain) F López	1	3
(Australia) J Thompson	6	6
10	(Russia) K Khachanov	2	3

Third round
6	(South Africa) K Anderson	6	7^{8}
(Portugal) J Sousa	4	6^{6}
24	(Bulgaria) G Dimitrov	5	5
(Australia) J Thompson	7	7

Fourth round
6	(South Africa) K Anderson	7	7
(Australia) J Thompson	5	5

==== Section 6 ====
First round
(France) A Mannarino	4	6	6
(Slovenia) A Bedene	6	4	2
Q	(United States) R Opelka	4	6	6
(Germany) J-L Struff	6	3	4
(France) P-H Herbert	4	4
(Serbia) F Krajinović	6	6
Q	(Moldova) R Albot	6	3
(Australia) M Ebden	0	2^{r}

Second round
13	(Russia) D Medvedev	6	6
(France) A Mannarino	2	1
Q	(United States) R Opelka	6	3	6
21	(Argentina) D Schwartzman	4	6	4
30	(Switzerland) S Wawrinka	7	2	6^{5}
(Serbia) F Krajinović	5	6	7^{7}
Q	(Moldova) R Albot	6	5	3
4	(Switzerland) R Federer	4	7	6

Third round
13	(Russia) D Medvedev	7^{7}	6^{5}	7^{7}
Q	(United States) R Opelka	6^{5}	7^{7}	6^{0}
(Serbia) F Krajinović	5	3
4	(Switzerland) R Federer	7	6

Fourth round
13	(Russia) D Medvedev	4	2
4	(Switzerland) R Federer	6	6

==== Section 7 ====
First round
LL	(United States) M McDonald	6	6^{4}	7^{7}
(France) U Humbert	4	7^{7}	6^{4}
(Argentina) L Mayer	4	6	6
Q	(Sweden) M Ymer	6	3	4
LL	(United Kingdom) D Evans	6	6
(Tunisia) M Jaziri	2	0
Q	(Russia) A Rublev	3	6	6
(Japan) T Daniel	6	3	4

Second round
8	(Greece) S Tsitsipas	7^{7}	6
LL	(United States) M McDonald	6^{4}	1
(Argentina) L Mayer	6	6
26	(Argentina) G Pella	2	4
20	(Canada) D Shapovalov	4	6	6
LL	(United Kingdom) D Evans	6	1	3
Q	(Russia) A Rublev	6	6
9	(Croatia) M Čilić	4	4

Third round
8	(Greece) S Tsitsipas	6	6
(Argentina) L Mayer	4	4
20	(Canada) D Shapovalov	6	7^{7}
Q	(Russia) A Rublev	3	6^{5}

Fourth round
8	(Greece) S Tsitsipas	6	3	6^{3}
20	(Canada) D Shapovalov	4	6	7^{7}

==== Section 8 ====
First round
WC	(United States) C Eubanks	6	4	6^{5}
(Bosnia and Herzegovina) D Džumhur	1	6	7^{7}
(Spain) P Andújar	7^{7}	6
(Croatia) I Karlović	6^{2}	4
(Latvia) E Gulbis	2	5
WC	(Serbia) M Kecmanović	6	7
(United States) S Querrey	3	2
WC	(Spain) D Ferrer	6	6

Second round
14	(Italy) M Cecchinato	w/o
(Bosnia and Herzegovina) D Džumhur
(Spain) P Andújar	4	1
18	(Belgium) D Goffin	6	6
28	(United States) F Tiafoe	7^{8}	7^{7}
WC	(Serbia) M Kecmanović	6^{6}	6^{5}
WC	(Spain) D Ferrer	2	7	6
2	(Germany) A Zverev	6	5	3

Third round
14	(Italy) M Cecchinato	4	4
18	(Belgium) D Goffin	6	6
28	(United States) F Tiafoe	5	6	6
WC	(Spain) D Ferrer	7	3	3

Fourth round
18	(Belgium) D Goffin	5	6^{6}
28	(United States) F Tiafoe	7	7^{8}

== Qualifying ==
=== Seeds ===
1. (Moldova) Radu Albot (qualified)
2. (Canada) Félix Auger-Aliassime (qualified)
3. (United States) Reilly Opelka (qualified)
4. (United States) Mackenzie McDonald (qualifying competition, lucky loser)
5. (Argentina) Juan Ignacio Londero (first round)
6. (Chile) Cristian Garín (first round)
7. (Uruguay) Pablo Cuevas (qualified)
8. (Bolivia) Hugo Dellien (first round)
9. (South Africa) Lloyd Harris (qualifying competition. Lucky loser)
10. (Norway) Casper Ruud (qualified)
11. (Lithuania) Ričardas Berankis (first round)
12. (India) Prajnesh Gunneswaran (qualified)
13. (United Kingdom) Dan Evans (qualifying competition, lucky loser)
14. (Uzbekistan) Denis Istomin (qualifying competition, withdrew)
15. (Russia) Andrey Rublev (qualified)
16. (United States) Ryan Harrison (first round)
17. (Italy) Paolo Lorenzi (qualifying competition)
18. (Italy) Lorenzo Sonego (qualified)
19. (Spain) Marcel Granollers (qualifying competition)
20. (Slovakia) Jozef Kovalík (first round)
21. (Sweden) Elias Ymer (first round)
22. (France) Jo-Wilfried Tsonga (qualifying competition)
23. (Brazil) Thiago Monteiro (qualified)
24. (Russia) Evgeny Donskoy (qualifying competition)

=== Qualifiers ===
1. (Moldova) Radu Albot
2. (Canada) Félix Auger-Aliassime
3. (United States) Reilly Opelka
4. (Italy) Lorenzo Sonego
5. (Slovakia) Lukáš Lacko
6. (Russia) Andrey Rublev
7. (Uruguay) Pablo Cuevas
8. (Sweden) Mikael Ymer
9. (Brazil) Thiago Monteiro
10. (Norway) Casper Ruud
11. (Kazakhstan) Alexander Bublik
12. (India) Prajnesh Gunneswaran

=== Lucky losers ===
1. (United States) Mackenzie McDonald
2. (United Kingdom) Dan Evans
3. (South Africa) Lloyd Harris

=== Qualifying draw ===
==== First qualifier ====
First round
1	(Moldova) Radu Albot	7^{7}	6
(Italy) Gianluigi Quinzi	6^{5}	0
(United States) Mitchell Krueger	6^{5}	6	6
21	(Sweden) Elias Ymer	7^{7}	0	4

Qualifying competition
1	(Moldova) Radu Albot	6	7
(United States) Mitchell Krueger	3	5

==== Second qualifier ====
First round
2	(Canada) Félix Auger-Aliassime	4	6	6
(Italy) Luca Vanni	6	4	1
(Belgium) Ruben Bemelmans	5	6	6^{5}
17	(Italy) Paolo Lorenzi	7	3	7^{7}

Qualifying competition
2	(Canada) Félix Auger-Aliassime	7^{7}	6
17	(Italy) Paolo Lorenzi	6^{1}	2

==== Third qualifier ====
First round
3/WC	(United States) Reilly Opelka	7^{9}	7^{7}
(Switzerland) Henri Laaksonen	6^{7}	6^{3}
WC	(United States) Zane Khan	2	3
19	(Spain) Marcel Granollers	6	6

Qualifying competition
3/WC	(United States) Reilly Opelka	6	7^{7}
19	(Spain) Marcel Granollers	3	6^{4}

==== Fourth qualifier ====
First round
4	(United States) Mackenzie McDonald	7^{7}	7
(Canada) Peter Polansky	6^{4}	5
(India) Ramkumar Ramanathan	4	1
18	(Italy) Lorenzo Sonego	6	6

Qualifying competition
4	(United States) Mackenzie McDonald	5	4
18	(Italy) Lorenzo Sonego	7	6

==== Fifth qualifier ====
First round
5	(Argentina) Juan Ignacio Londero	4	1
(Slovakia) Lukáš Lacko	6	6
(Barbados) Darian King	4	6	6^{3}
14	(Uzbekistan) Denis Istomin	6	3	7^{7}

Qualifying competition
(Slovakia) Lukáš Lacko	w/o
14	(Uzbekistan) Denis Istomin

==== Sixth qualifier ====
First round
6	(Chile) Cristian Garín	6	6^{2}	1
(United States) Bjorn Fratangelo	4	7^{7}	6
(United States) Jared Donaldson	2	3
15	(Russia) Andrey Rublev	6	6

Qualifying competition
(United States) Bjorn Fratangelo	4	4
15	(Russia) Andrey Rublev	6	6

==== Seventh qualifier ====
First round
7	(Uruguay) Pablo Cuevas	2	6	6
(Belarus) Egor Gerasimov	6	4	2
(Czech Republic) Lukáš Rosol	3	4
22/WC	(France) Jo-Wilfried Tsonga	6	6

Qualifying competition
7	(Uruguay) Pablo Cuevas	6	6
22/WC	(France) Jo-Wilfried Tsonga	4	4

==== Eighth qualifier ====
First round
8	(Bolivia) Hugo Dellien	3	2
(United States) Noah Rubin	6	6
WC	(Sweden) Mikael Ymer	6	6
16	(United States) Ryan Harrison	1	3

Qualifying competition
(United States) Noah Rubin	4	7	2
WC	(Sweden) Mikael Ymer	6	5	6

==== Ninth qualifier ====
First round
9	(South Africa) Lloyd Harris	6	6
(Australia) Alexei Popyrin	4	2
(Poland) Kamil Majchrzak	6	6^{4}	2
23	(Brazil) Thiago Monteiro	2	7^{7}	6

Qualifying competition
9	(South Africa) Lloyd Harris	6^{5}	6^{2}
23	(Brazil) Thiago Monteiro	7^{7}	7^{7}

==== Tenth qualifier ====
First round
10	(Norway) Casper Ruud	7^{7}	7
(Chinese Taipei) Jason Jung	6^{4}	5
(Australia) Alex Bolt	6^{7}	3
24	(Russia) Evgeny Donskoy	7^{9}	6

Qualifying competition
10	(Norway) Casper Ruud	6^{2}	6	6
24	(Russia) Evgeny Donskoy	7^{7}	2	2

==== Eleventh qualifier ====
First round
11	(Lithuania) Ričardas Berankis	5	2
(Kazakhstan) Alexander Bublik	7	6
(Japan) Tatsuma Ito	5	1
13	(United Kingdom) Dan Evans	7	6

Qualifying competition
(Kazakhstan) Alexander Bublik	6	6
13	(United Kingdom) Dan Evans	4	4

==== Twelfth qualifier ====
First round
12	(India) Prajnesh Gunneswaran	6	6
(Spain) Adrián Menéndez Maceiras	2	4
WC	(United Kingdom) Jay Clarke	6	6
20	(Slovakia) Jozef Kovalík	2	3

Qualifying competition
12	(India) Prajnesh Gunneswaran	6	6
WC	(United Kingdom) Jay Clarke	4	4
