= 2017 WTA Finals =

- Date: October 22–29
- Edition: 47th (singles) / 42nd (doubles)
- Category: WTA Finals
- Draw: 8S / 8D
- Surface: Hard (indoor)
- Location: Kallang, Singapore
- Venue: Singapore Indoor Stadium

Champions

Singles
- (Denmark) Caroline Wozniacki

Doubles
- (Hungary) Tímea Babos / (Czech Republic) Andrea Hlaváčková
← 2016 ·	WTA Finals	· 2018 →

The 2017 WTA Finals was a women's tennis tournament held in Kallang, Singapore. It was the 47th edition of the singles event and the 42nd edition of the doubles competition. The tournament was contested by eight singles players and eight doubles teams. The tournament was contested by eight singles players and eight doubles teams. The tournament was the year-end final of the 2017 WTA Tour. It was the final professional tournament for top-ranked doubles player and former top-ranked singles player Martina Hingis. Sixth-seeded Caroline Wozniacki won the singles title.

== Finals ==
=== Singles ===
- (Denmark) Caroline Wozniacki defeated (United States) Venus Williams, 6–4, 6–4

=== Doubles ===
- (Hungary) Tímea Babos / (Czech Republic) Andrea Hlaváčková defeated (Netherlands) Kiki Bertens / (Sweden) Johanna Larsson, 4–6, 6–4, [10–5]

== Tournament ==
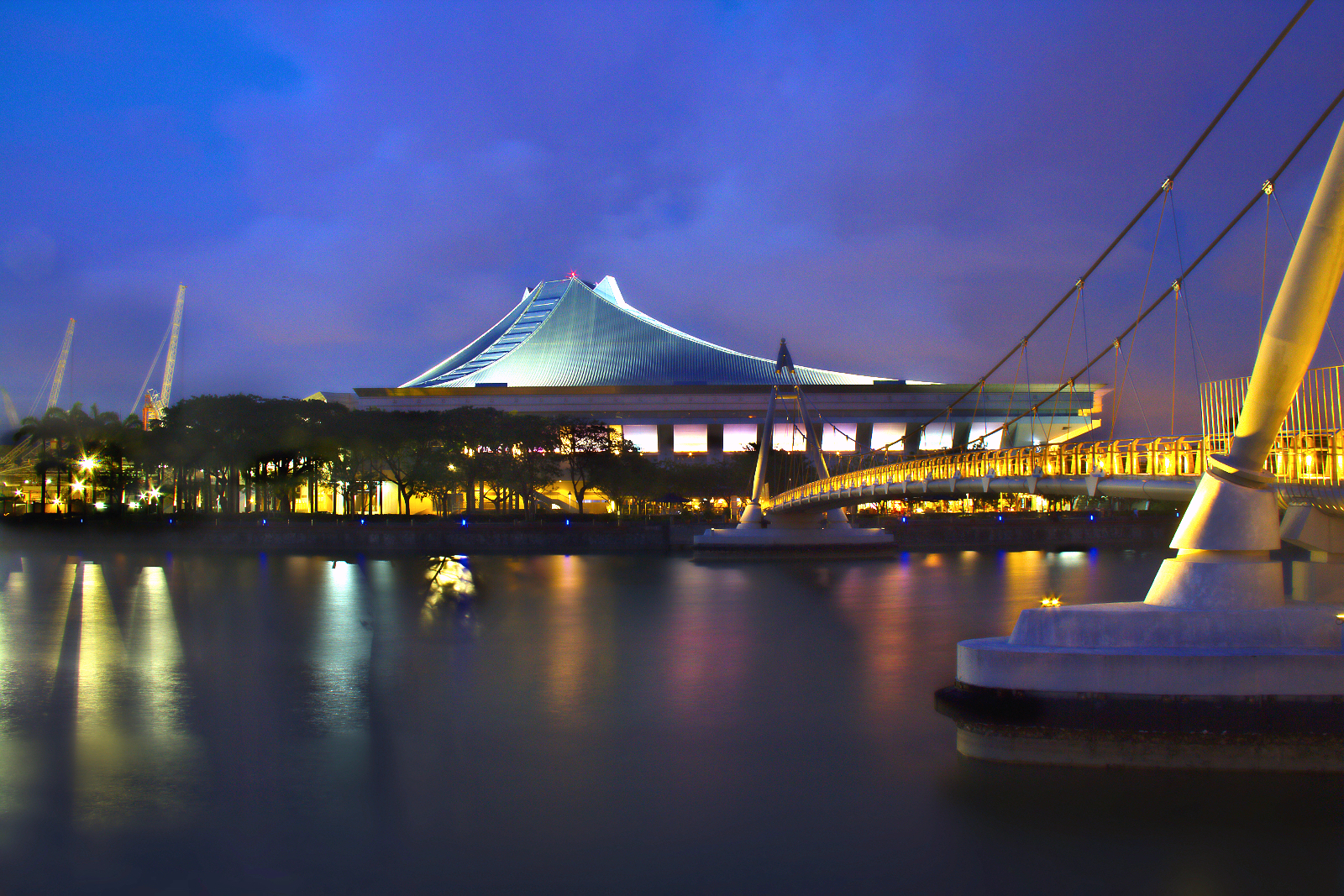
Singapore Indoor Stadium hosted the WTA Finals for the first time in 2014.

The 2017 WTA Finals took place at the Singapore Indoor Stadium the week of October 23, 2017, and was the 47th edition of the event. The tournament was run by the Women's Tennis Association (WTA) as part of the 2017 WTA Tour. Singapore is now the ninth city to host the WTA Finals since its inauguration in 1972 and will host the event for at least five years.

=== Qualifying ===
In singles, point totals are calculated by combining point totals from sixteen tournaments. Of these sixteen tournaments, a player's results from the four Grand Slam events, the four Premier Mandatory tournaments, and (for Top 20 players at the end of 2016) the best results from two Premier 5 tournaments must be included.
In doubles, point totals are calculated by any combination of eleven tournaments throughout the year. Unlike in singles, this combination does not need to include results from the Grand Slams or Premier-level tournaments.

=== Format ===
The singles event features eight players in a round robin event, split into two groups of four. Over the first four days of competition, each player meets the other three players in her group, with the top two in each group advancing to the semifinals. The first-placed player in one group meets the second-placed player in the other group, and vice versa. The winners of each semifinal meet in the championship match. The doubles event returns to a single elimination event. The winners of each quarterfinal match will advance to the semifinals and the winners of each semifinal match will advance to the final.

==== Round robin tie-breaking methods ====
The final standings of each group were determined by the first of the following methods that applied:

1. Greatest number of wins.
2. Greatest number of matches played.
3. Head-to-head results if only two players are tied, or if three players are tied then:

a. If three players each have the same number of wins, a player having played less than all three matches is automatically eliminated and the player advancing to the single elimination competition is the winner of the match-up of the two remaining tied players.
b. Highest percentage of sets won.
c. Highest percentage of games won.

== Prize money and points ==
The total prize money for the BNP Paribas 2017 WTA Finals was US$7,000,000.

Singles
Stage	Prize money	Points
Champion	RR^{1} + $1,750,000	RR + 750
Runner-up	RR + $590,000	RR + 330
Semifinalist	RR + $40,000	RR
Round robin win per match	+$153,000	+250
Round robin loss per match	—	+125
Participation Fee	3 matches = $151,000; 2 matches = $130,000; 1 match = $110,000	—
Alternates	2 matches = $109,000; 1 match = $89,000; 0 matches = $68,000	—
^{1} RR means prize money or points won in the round robin round.

Doubles
Stage	Prize money	Points
Champions	$500,000	1500
Runners-up	$260,000	1080
Semifinalists	$157,500	750
Quarterfinalists	$81,250	375
Prize Money per team

== Qualified players ==
=== Singles ===
#	Players	Points	Tourn	Date Qualified
1	Simona Halep (ROU)	5,675	17	26 September
2	Garbiñe Muguruza (ESP)	5,635	20	11 September
3	Karolína Plíšková (CZE)	5,105	19	26 September
4	Elina Svitolina (UKR)	5,000	17	26 September
5	Venus Williams (USA)	4,642	14	26 September
6	Caroline Wozniacki (DEN)	4,640	21	30 September
7	Jeļena Ostapenko (LAT)	4,510	20	4 October
8	Caroline Garcia (FRA)	3,795	23	12 October

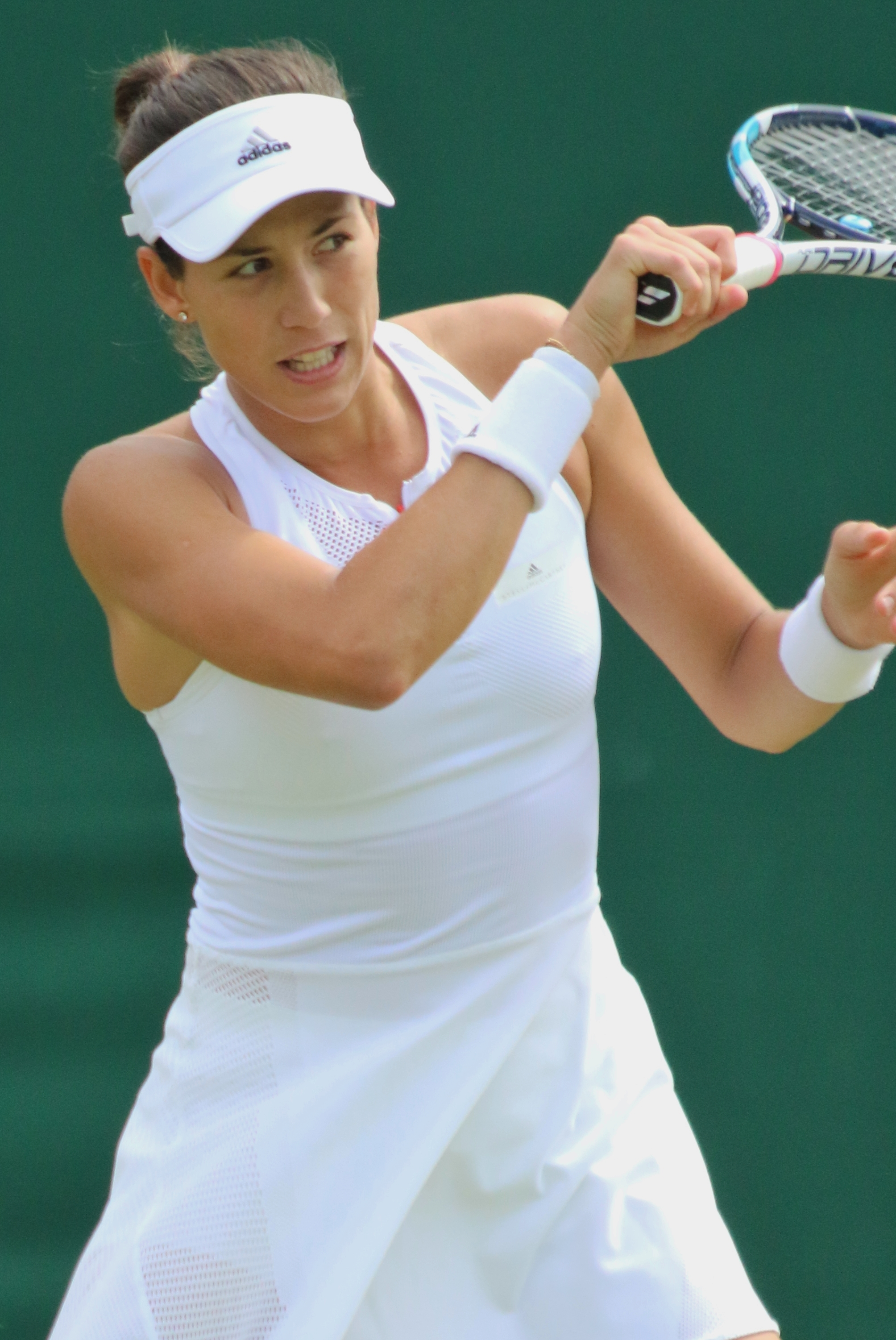
Muguruza won her second slam at Wimbledon.

- On 11 September, Garbiñe Muguruza became the first qualifier.

Garbiñe Muguruza began her season in Brisbane, where she retired in the semifinals. She recovered from this injury to reach the quarterfinals at the Australian Open, losing to CoCo Vandeweghe in straight sets. She had early exits in the Middle East before making the quarterfinals in Indian Wells and the fourth round in Miami, falling to Karolína Plíšková and retiring against Caroline Wozniacki respectively.

Muguruza's clay court season started slowly, losing her opening matches in Stuttgart and Madrid. She found form in Rome, reaching the semifinals, but failed to defend her French Open crown, ousted in the fourth round by Kristina Mladenovic. Muguruza opened her grass court season in Birmingham where she lost to Ashleigh Barty in the semifinals. She followed this up with a first round loss in Eastbourne to Barbora Strýcová, only managing to win one game. However, this slump was short-lived as her next tournament was a success, defeating Venus Williams in the final at Wimbledon, capturing her second major.

Muguruza kept up the good form on the American hard courts, making the semifinals in Stanford and the quarterfinals in Toronto. She then claimed her second title of the year, comprehensively beating Simona Halep in the final of Cincinnati, the last of three top-10 victories that week. However, she was unable to continue this string of deep runs, falling to Petra Kvitová in the fourth round of the US Open. Despite the relatively early exit, at the completion of this tournament, Muguruza took over the spot of World No.1 for the first time in her career.

Muguruza opened her Asian hard-court swing in Tokyo, losing in the semifinals to Caroline Wozniacki. The following week in Wuhan, she fell to Jeļena Ostapenko in the quarterfinals. Her last tournament before the WTA Finals was in Beijing where she retired in the first round, marking her fourth retirement this season.

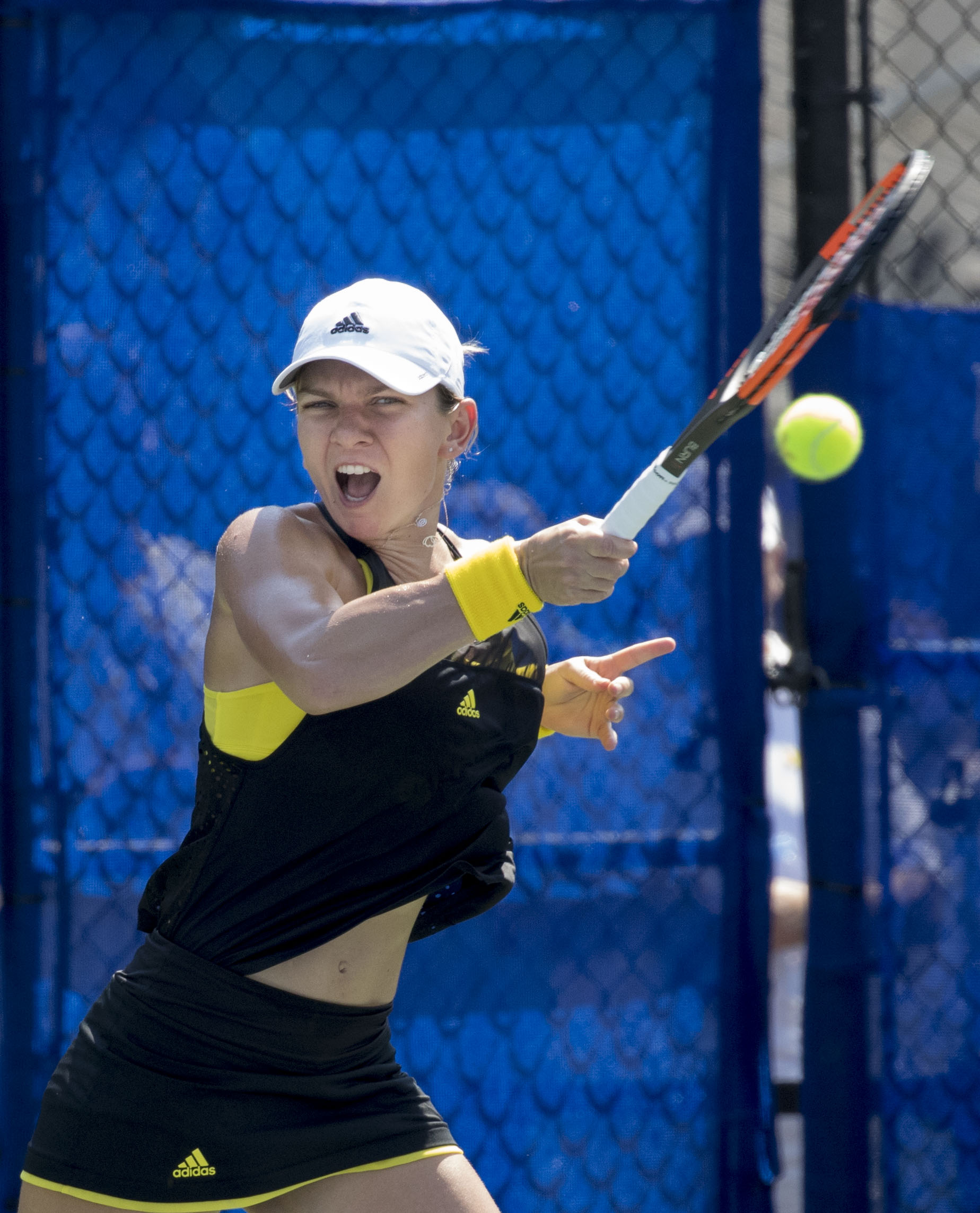
Halep reached the final at Roland Garros.

- On 26 September, Simona Halep, Karolína Plíšková, Elina Svitolina and Venus Williams became the second, third, fourth and fifth qualifiers.

Simona Halep comes into the WTA finals as the current World No.1 after a rather consistent year. Despite this, she began her year quite poorly, only managing three wins in her first four tournaments. A second-round loss in Shenzhen was followed up by a straight sets defeat in her opening match at the Australian Open to Shelby Rogers. She then retired in the quarterfinals of St. Petersburg before Kristina Mladenovic beat her in the third round in Indian Wells. She then reached the quarterfinals in Miami, losing to Johanna Konta.

Halep began to put in impressive results in the clay court season, starting with a semifinal showing in Stuttgart. She followed this up with her first title of the season in Madrid, winning in three sets over Kristina Mladenovic. She made another final the following week in Rome, but failed to overcome Elina Svitolina. She continued her string of reaching finals, this time at the French Open. However, she was again unsuccessful in taking home the trophy, losing to Jeļena Ostapenko.

Halep's first tournament on grass was in Eastbourne, which ended with a loss to Caroline Wozniacki in the quarterfinals. She also lost at the quarterfinal stage at Wimbledon, at the hands of Johanna Konta. After a retirement on the hard courts of Washington, Halep's results on this surface began to pick up. Reaching the semifinals of Toronto and the final of Cincinnati, losing to Elina Svitolina and Garbiñe Muguruza respectively. However, she drew Maria Sharapova in the first round of the US Open and suffered a three-set loss. She then lost her opening match in Wuhan. The following week, she reached the final in Beijing, losing to Caroline Garcia. Despite the loss, due to beating Jeļena Ostapenko in the semifinals, Halep became World No.1 for the first time.

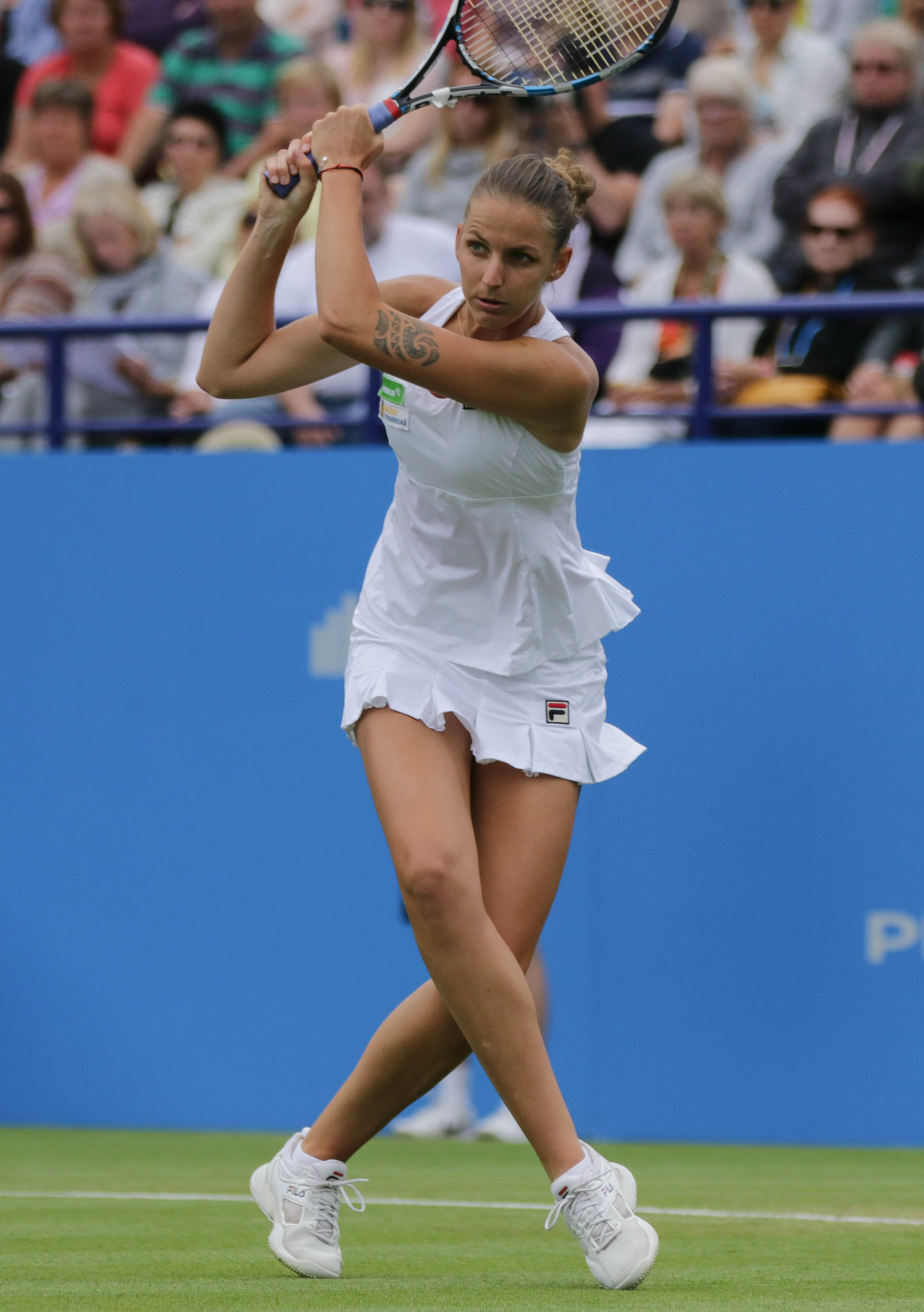
Plíšková won three titles in the year.

Karolína Plíšková began her season with a strong showing in Brisbane, winning the title by defeating Alizé Cornet in the final. She followed this up with a quarterfinal showing at the Australian Open, losing in three sets to Mirjana Lučić-Baroni. Plíšková very quickly got back on the winner's board, claiming the title in Doha with a win over Caroline Wozniacki in the final. However, the following week she lost her opening match in Dubai. She had consistent results in Indian Wells and Miami, losing in the semifinals of both tournaments to Svetlana Kuznetsova and Caroline Wozniacki respectively.

Plíšková got off on the wrong foot in the clay court season, exiting early in Stuttgart, Prague and Madrid. She did manage to find some form at the following tournaments, with a quarterfinal finish in Rome and a semifinal finish at the French Open. She looked back on top of her game when the grass court swing came around, winning the title in Eastbourne over Caroline Wozniacki. However, it quickly came to an end with a shock loss to Magdaléna Rybáriková in the second round of Wimbledon. Despite the early exit, Plíšková earned the position of World No.1 for the first time in her career.

Next up for Plíšková were the American hard courts, where she had strong results. Losses to Caroline Wozniacki in the quarterfinals of Toronto and the semifinals of Cincinnati to Garbiñe Muguruza preceded the US Open where she fell in the quarterfinals to CoCo Vandeweghe. She then entered Tokyo and Wuhan, reaching the quarterfinals at both tournaments before losing to Angelique Kerber and Ashleigh Barty respectively. This was followed by a third-round loss in Beijing.

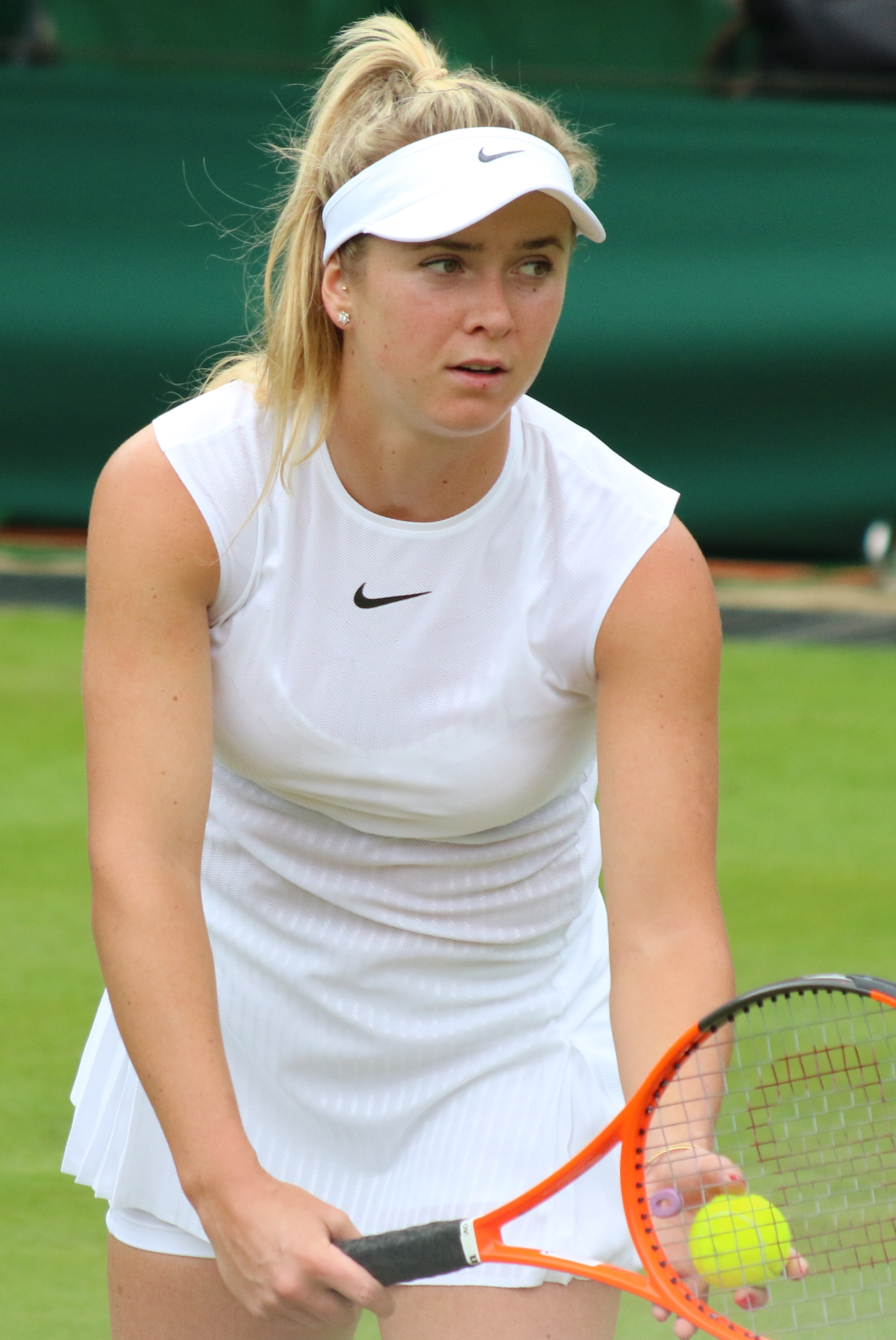
Svitolina won three Premier 5 titles.

Elina Svitolina had an impressive year, putting together the best season of her career which included a tour-leading five titles. She opened her season in Brisbane with a semifinal loss to eventual champion Karolína Plíšková. At the Australian Open, she fell in three sets to Anastasia Pavlyuchenkova in the third round. Her next two tournaments ended with a trophy, defeating Peng Shuai in the final of Taipei, before coming away victorious in Dubai against Caroline Wozniacki. However, her next three tournaments were not as successful, retiring in the second round in Kuala Lumpur and suffering early exits in Indian Wells and Miami.

Svitolina began her clay court swing in Istanbul where she claimed the title, defeating Elise Mertens in the final. After a first round exit in Madrid, she rebounded to win another title, this time against Simona Halep in Rome. However, the next time she met the Romanian she did not have the same success, losing in the quarterfinals of the French Open despite having a match point in the second set. Svitolina struggled on the grass court of Birmingham, falling in the second round. This was followed up by a fourth-round loss to Jeļena Ostapenko at Wimbledon.

Getting back on hard courts, Svitolina wasted no time picking up another title, defeating Caroline Wozniacki in the final of Toronto. She couldn't find the same form in Cincinnati, falling in the third round. At the US Open, she reached the fourth round before losing to eventual finalist Madison Keys. A quarterfinal loss to Caroline Garcia in Beijing followed, and in her most recent tournament in Hong Kong, she withdrew before her second-round match.

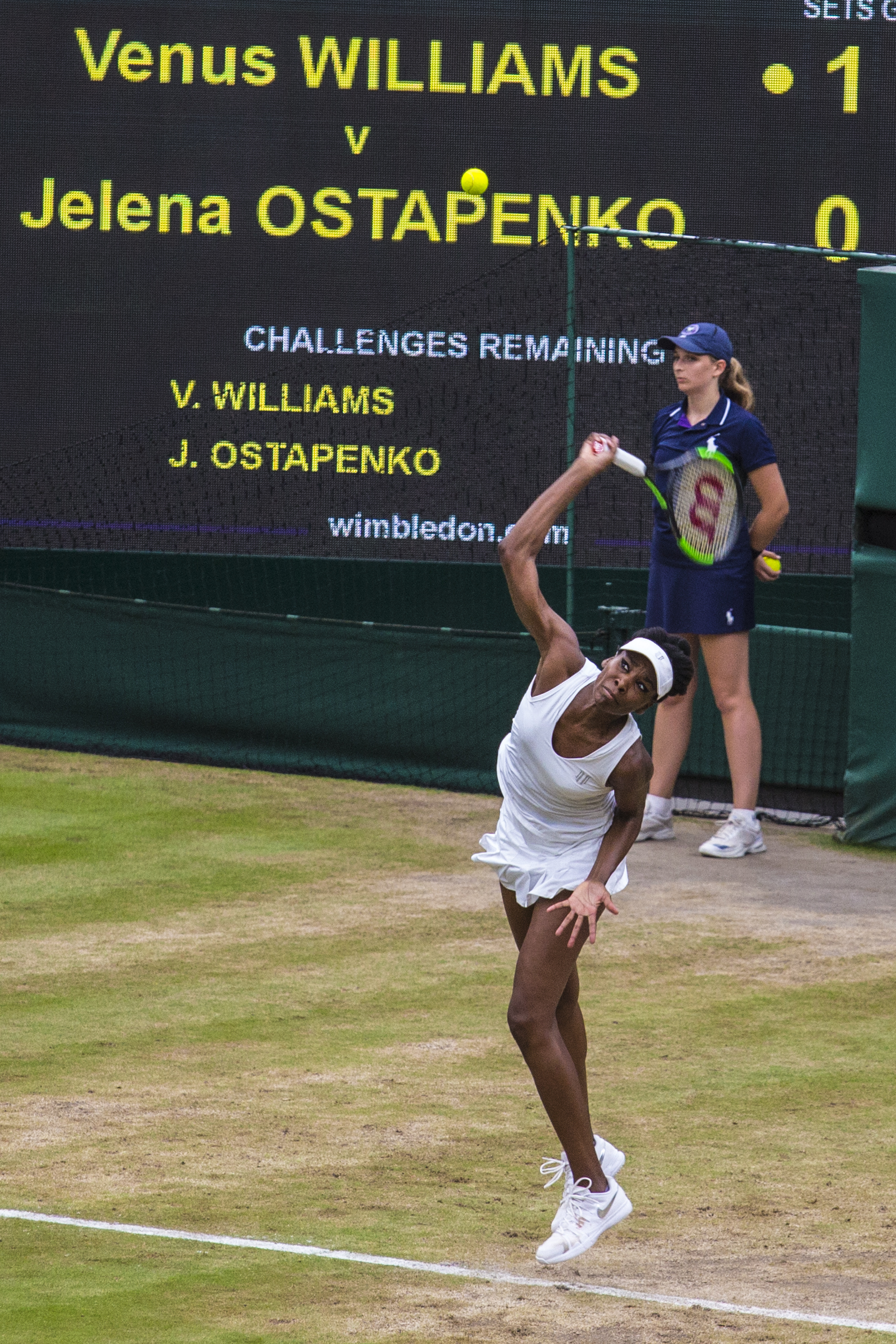
Venus Williams reached two slam finals.

Venus Williams had quite a resurgent season. After withdrawing from her second-round match in Auckland, she made it all the way to the final of the Australian Open, her first major final in eight years. However, she lost to sister Serena in the final. Her next tournament ended quickly, losing her opening match in St. Petersburg to eventual winner Kristina Mladenovic. Williams returned to form for the Sunshine swing, falling to Elena Vesnina in Indian Wells and Johanna Konta in Miami, both of whom went on to claim the title.

Williams suffered an early exit at her first clay court tournament of the year in Charleston. She put in better performances in her next two tournaments, losing to Garbiñe Muguruza in the quarterfinals of Madrid, before falling in the fourth round of the French Open against Timea Bacsinszky. She then proved she didn't need and warm-up grass court tournaments before Wimbledon, progressing to the final. This makes her the only player to reach two major finals this season. She was unable to claim the title however, falling in straight sets to Garbiñe Muguruza.

The American hard-court swing didn't get off to a good start for Williams, as she fell to Elina Svitolina and Ashleigh Barty in the third round of Toronto and the second round of Cincinnati respectively. She managed to turn things around at the US Open, reaching the semifinal stage before being defeated by Sloane Stephens. In her only tournament of the Asian swing, Williams lost in the second round of Hong Kong to Naomi Osaka.

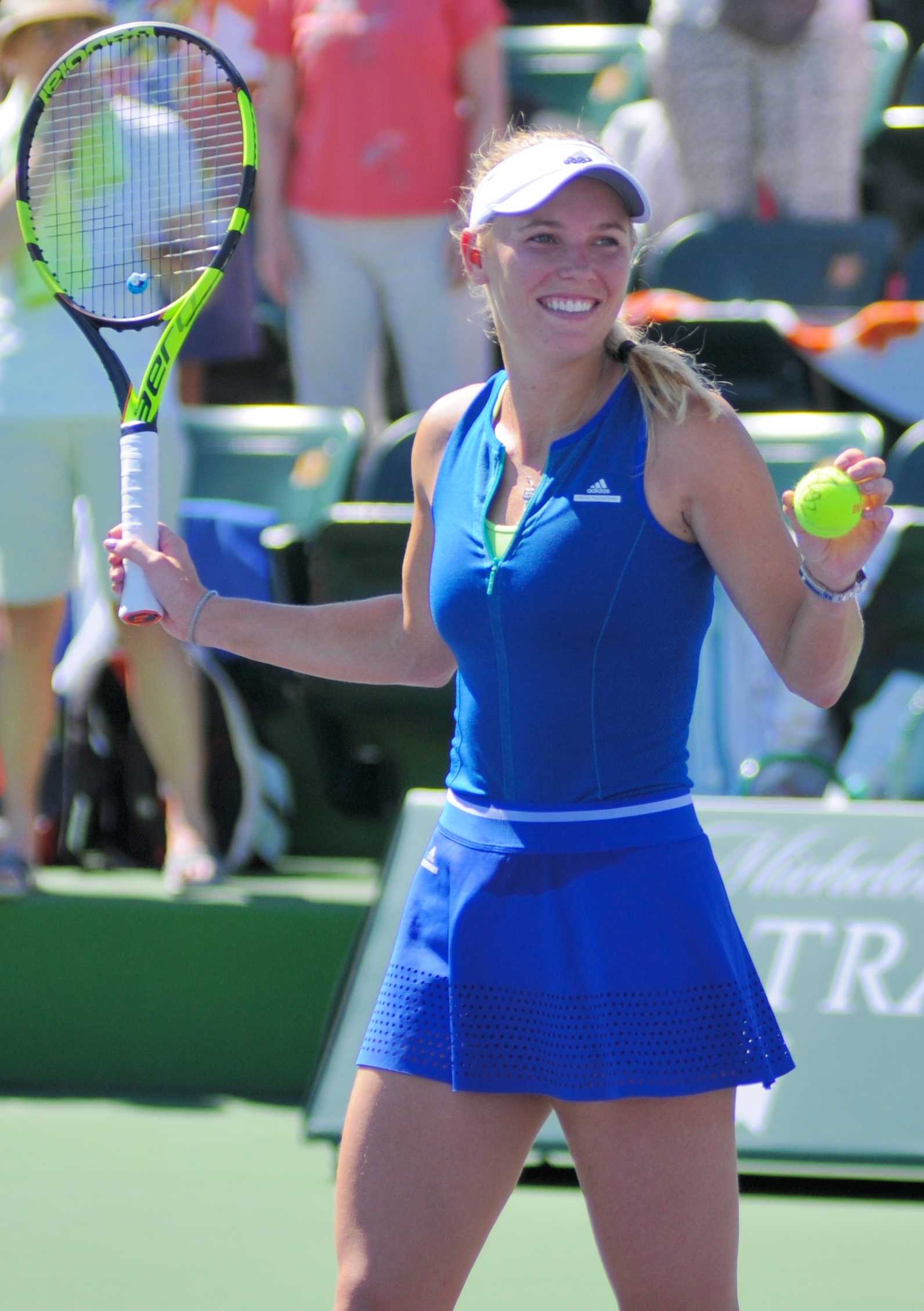
Wozniacki returned to the top 5.

- On 30 September, Caroline Wozniacki became the sixth qualifier for the tournament.

Caroline Wozniacki had an extremely consistent season, proven by her tour-leading seven finals. Her first two tournaments were in Auckland and Sydney, where she reached the quarterfinals of both. At the Australian Open, she made it to the third round before a straights loss to Johanna Konta. Wozniacki then made back-to-back finals in the Middle East, falling to Karolína Plíšková in Doha and Elina Svitolina in Dubai. Her solid form stayed with her in Indian Wells and Miami, losing in the quarterfinals of the former to Kristina Mladenovic before making her first Premier Mandatory final in four years at the later. However, she lost to Johanna Konta.

Wozniacki's first two clay court tournaments were in Charleston and Prague, both of which came to end at the hands of Jeļena Ostapenko in the quarterfinals and second round respectively. Her poor results continued in Madrid, losing in the second round to Carla Suárez Navarro. She then retired in her first-round match in Strasbourg. Wozniacki rebounded to make it to the quarterfinals of the French Open, but once again fell to Jeļena Ostapenko.

Wozniacki started the grass court swing with good form. She reached the final in Eastbourne, but ultimately lost the title-match to Karolína Plíšková. Despite the positive result, she was unable to progress as far at Wimbledon, bowing out in the fourth round after losing in straight sets to CoCo Vandeweghe. Following this, Wozniacki returned to the clay courts, this time in Båstad where she lost in the final to Kateřina Siniaková. Wozniacki made another final at her next tournament in Toronto. Along the way, she recorded her first victory over a current World No. 1 when she defeated Karolína Plíšková in the quarterfinals. However, she could not manage a similar result in the final, losing to Elina Svitolina to mark her sixth straight loss in finals this season. She then lost in the quarterfinals of Cincinnati to Karolína Plíšková, before a surprise loss to Ekaterina Makarova ended her US Open campaign in the second round.

Wozniacki finally broke through in Tokyo, defeating Anastasia Pavlyuchenkova in the final to claim her first title of the season. However, this did not set up good results for the rest of the season, losing her opening match in Wuhan, falling to Petra Kvitová in the third round of Beijing and withdrawing before her second-round match in Hong Kong.

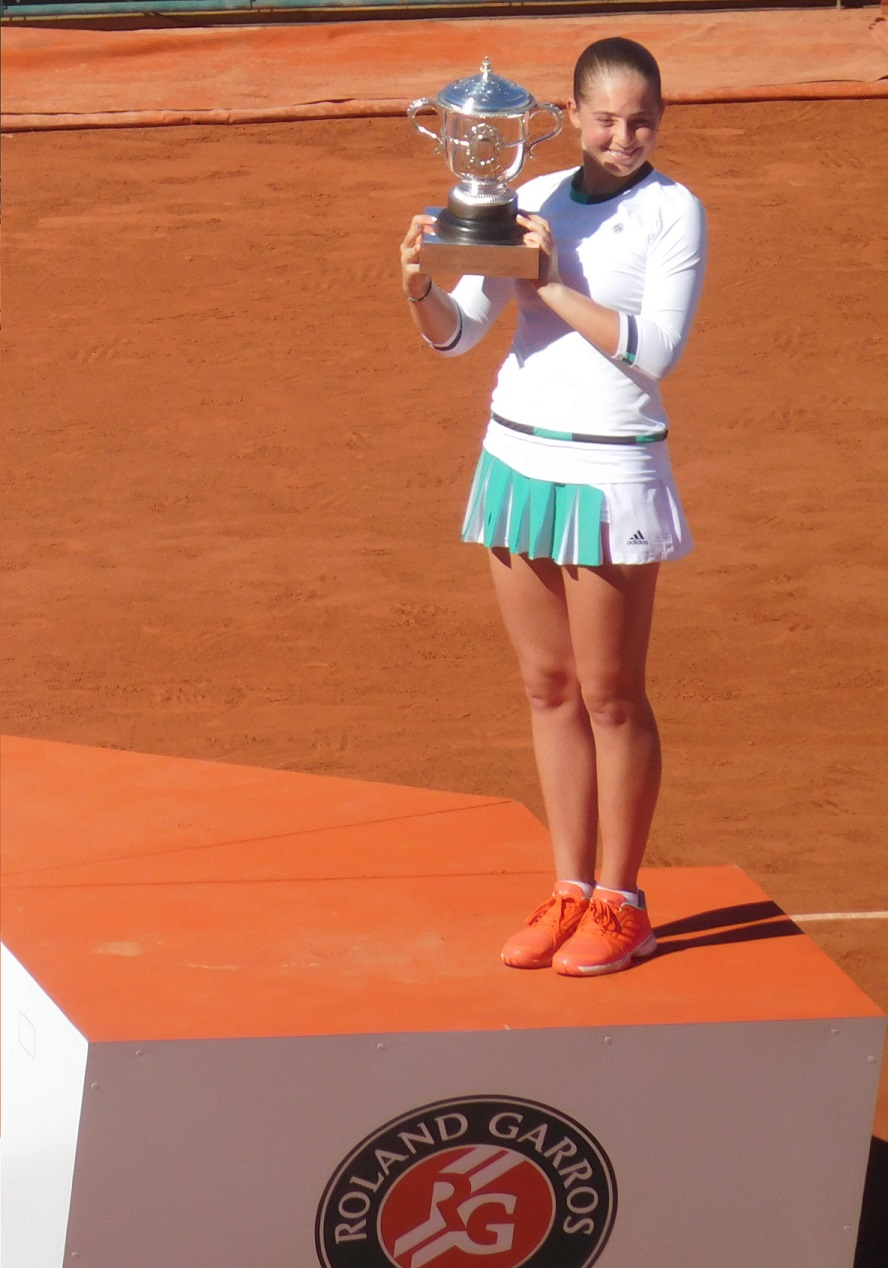
Ostapenko won her maiden slam at Roland Garros.

- On 4 October, Jeļena Ostapenko became the seventh qualifier for the tournament.

Jeļena Ostapenko began her season in Auckland, where she retired during her semifinal match. At the Australian Open, she was ousted by Karolína Plíšková in the third round. This was followed up with first-round exits in St. Petersburg and Dubai and a quarterfinal loss in Acapulco. Her form didn't improve much on the Sunshine swing either, losing to Dominika Cibulková in the second round of Indian Wells and dropping her first-round match in Miami.

Ostapenko's form began to rise once she played on the clay courts of Charleston, losing in the final to Daria Kasatkina. She fell in the first round of Stuttgart to CoCo Vandeweghe before reaching the semifinals in Prague. She had another first-round loss, this time in Rome to Garbiñe Muguruza. However, she swept through the French Open, clinching the title over Simona Halep to claim the first major of her career.

On the grass courts in Eastbourne, Ostapenko lost in the third round to Johanna Konta. She then progressed to the quarterfinals of Wimbledon, where she crashed out in quarterfinals after losing to Venus Williams. The American hard-court swing didn't bring much luck for her, losing her opening matches in both Toronto and Cincinnati. At the US Open, she lost in the third round to Daria Kasatkina. Ostapenko then won her second title of the year in Seoul, defeating Beatriz Haddad Maia in the final. Her quality results continued in Asia, reaching the semifinal stage in both Wuhan and Beijing, falling to Ashleigh Barty and Simona Halep respectively.

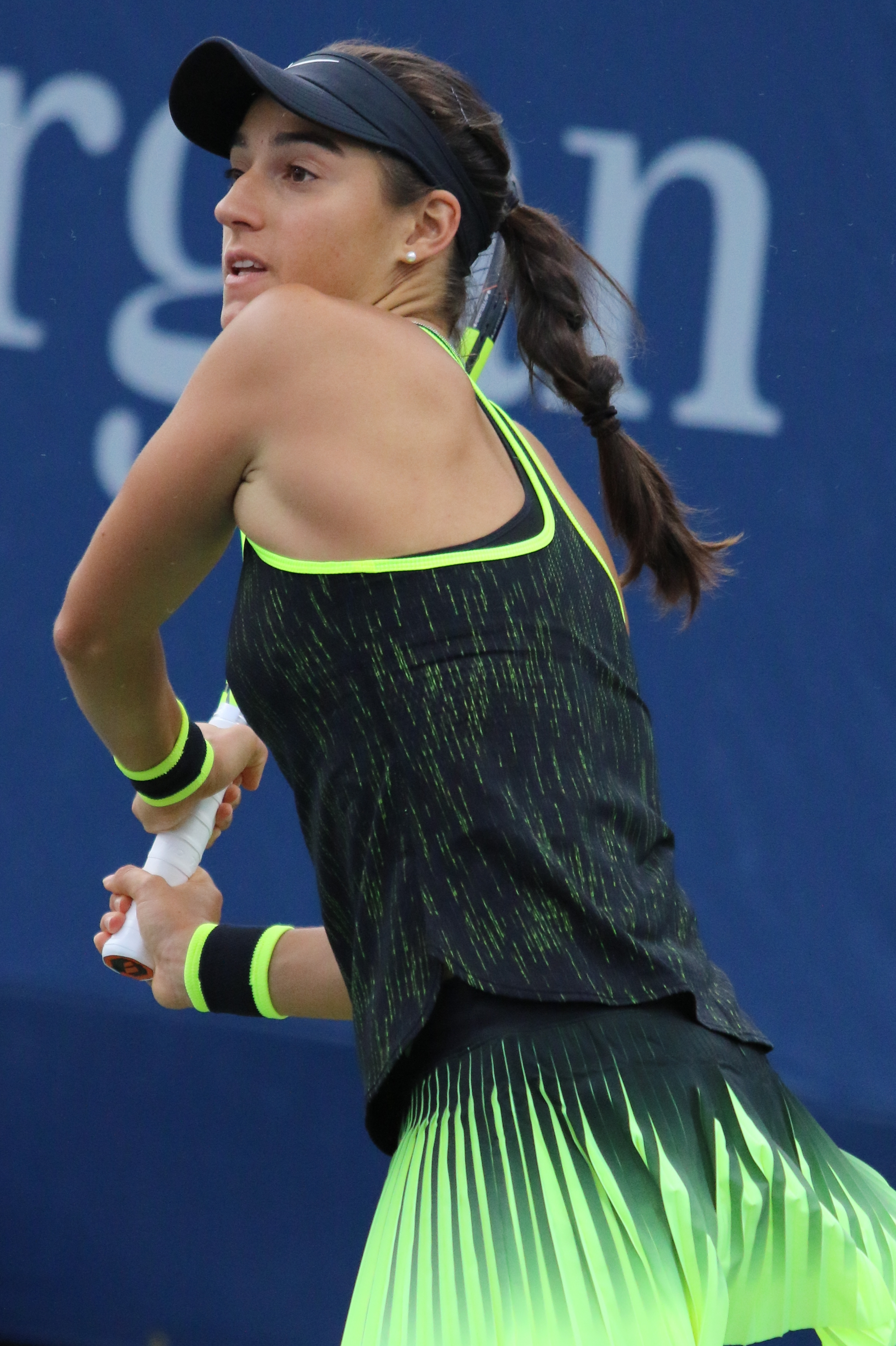
Garcia won the Asian double.

- On 12 October, Caroline Garcia became the eighth and last qualifier for the tournament.

Caroline Garcia opened her season at the Australian Open, where she fell in the third round to Barbora Strýcová. She struggled in her next four tournaments, failing to get beyond the second round in Taipei, Doha, Dubai and Kuala Lumpur. From there, she reached the fourth round in Indian Wells, losing to Svetlana Kuznetsova and then was knocked out in her opening match in Miami by Peng Shuai. However, she rebounded to reach the semifinals of Monterrey.

Garcia's clay court swing began slowly, falling in the first round of Madrid. She continued to progress deeper into her next couple of tournaments, losing in the second round and semifinals of Rome and Strasbourg respectively, both to Daria Gavrilova. She then reached the quarterfinals of the French Open before succumbing to Karolína Plíšková. Her grass court results were also solid, losing in the semifinals of Mallorca, and the fourth round of Wimbledon, where she was defeated by Johanna Konta.

After a second-round exit in Gstaad, Garcia reached the semifinals of Båstad. She then progressed to the quarterfinals in Toronto, losing to Simona Halep. This was followed up by a first-round loss in Cincinnati before she was defeated by Petra Kvitová in the third round of the US Open. Garcia's Asian swing brought about very good results beginning with a quarterfinal loss to Garbiñe Muguruza in Tokyo. Shen then won back-to-back titles in Wuhan and Beijing, defeating Ashleigh Barty and Simona Halep in the respective finals.

=== Doubles ===
#	Players	Points	Tourn	Date Qualified
1	Chan Yung-jan (TPE); Martina Hingis (SUI)	8,340	13	14 August
2	Ekaterina Makarova (RUS); Elena Vesnina (RUS)	6,495	12	14 August
3	Ashleigh Barty (AUS); Casey Dellacqua (AUS)	4,240	14	13 September
4	Tímea Babos (HUN); Andrea Hlaváčková (CZE)	4,005	15	4 October
—	Lucie Hradecká (CZE); Kateřina Siniaková (CZE)	3,871	14	25 September
5	Anna-Lena Grönefeld (GER); Květa Peschke (CZE)	3,005	22	7 October
6	Gabriela Dabrowski (CAN); Xu Yifan (CHN)	2,921	14	7 October
7	Andreja Klepač (SLO); María José Martínez Sánchez (ESP)	2,570	23	12 October
8	Kiki Bertens (NED); Johanna Larsson (SWE)	2,270	14	18 October

- On 14 August, Chan Yung-jan and Martina Hingis, and the team of Ekaterina Makarova and Elena Vesnina became the first two qualifiers.

Chan Yung-jan and Martina Hingis have been playing together since 2017 Doha. Before that, Yung-jan mainly partnered with her sister Hao-Ching, and Hingis partnered with Sania Mirza, among others. They took their first joint title in Indian Wells. The duo also played well in the clay court season, taking the Madrid Open and defending the Italian Open. Their clay court winning streak ended in the final of the French Open. They continued their triumphant performance in the grass court season, winning two titles in a row (Mallorca and Eastbourne), but reaching the quarterfinals of Wimbledon. The duo triumphed in Cincinnati, after Hingis failed to do so with Mirza in the 2016 season. Following that, the duo won three major titles in a row, US Open, Wuhan Open and China Open, staying unbeaten to date. Hingis became the new No. 1 doubles player and Chan joined her at No.1 before the finals.

For Yung-jan, it will be her fourth appearance at the Finals. For Hingis, it will be her eighth appearance, winning the title thrice.

Ekaterina Makarova and Elena Vesnina started the new season by reaching the final in the Premier Brisbane tournament. They then won their second joint Premier 5 tournament in Dubai. The duo improved their results in Miami and Indian Wells as they reached the quarterfinals and the semifinals respectively. They reached their only clay court final in Rome. The Russian duo then won their third joint Grand Slam doubles title in Wimbledon, winning the final in a rare double bagel (6–0, 6–0). Furthermore, they reduced the distance to the Super Slam as they will need to win the Australian Open to achieve that feat. They defended the title in the following Rogers Cup. In the Asian swing, the pair debuted at the Wuhan Open by reaching the quarterfinals, retiring in the first set, and they got into the semifinals of the China Open.

Makarova and Vesnina are the defending champions. For both players, it will be their third appearance in the Finals.

- On 13 September, Ashleigh Barty and Casey Dellacqua became the third qualifiers.

The team of Ashleigh Barty and Casey Dellacqua was one of the most strongest in 2013, who was not far away from qualifying for the four-teams Tour Championships. Since 2015, Barty partnered with other players and played mainly in the ITF tour, while Dellacqua had some success with Yaroslava Shvedova in 2015, but had to withdraw from the WTA Finals as she incurred a concussion in Beijing. In 2017, the Australians reunited and played together throughout the season. Their first success came at the Australian Open, reaching the quarterfinals. They won their first joint tournament, the Malaysian Open, but played poorly in Indian Wells and Miami. They won a second International tournament, now in Strasbourg, followed by a final entry at the French Open, losing their fourth joint Grand Slam on four different tournaments. However, the duo played well in the grass court season, winning one tournament out of two, and reaching the quarterfinals of the Wimbledon Championships. In the US series, the duo reached another final, in New Haven. At season's end their best result came in Beijing where they reached the semifinals.

For both players, it will be the debut appearance at the Finals.

- On 25 September, Lucie Hradecká and Kateřina Siniaková were announced to be the fourth qualifiers. However, Hradecká announced their withdrawal due to a knee injury she sustained in Wuhan. This would be Hradecká's fourth appearance in the finals, which Siniaková would make her debut appearance in the finals.
- On 4 October, Tímea Babos and Andrea Hlaváčková originally became the fifth qualifiers. However, after Hradecká's withdrawal, they moved up to the fourth qualifiers.
- On 7 October, the teams of Anna-Lena Grönefeld/Květa Peschke and Gabriela Dabrowski/Xu Yifan took the fifth and sixth spot respectively.

Anna-Lena Grönefeld and Květa Peschke regularly partnered together since 2012. Although Grönefeld did not have a steady partner before that, she could gain success with different partners. Peschke had a strong partnership with Katarina Srebotnik before that. In the 2017 season, the pair did not play well until May, when they won the International Prague Open, their only title this year. They had less success in the clay and grass court season, but they managed to reach the semifinals in Wimbledon. They also reached the final in the following Rogers Cup. In the late season, the German-Czech duo's best result was reaching the quarterfinals of the Wuhan Open.

This is Grönefeld's first appearance at the Finals. For Peschke, it will be her seventh appearance at the Finals.

Gabriela Dabrowski and Xu Yifan debuted as a team in Miami, surprisingly beating top players such as Makarova/Vesnina, Hlaváčková/Peng and Mirza/Strýcová on their way before claiming their first title. They won another title in New Haven, beating Barty/Dellacqua in the final. Their best Grand Slam performance came at the US Open, where they reached the quarterfinals. In the Asian swing, they had moderate success, reaching the quarterfinals in Wuhan and Beijing.

For both players, it will be their debut appearance at the Finals.

- On 12 October, Andreja Klepač and María José Martínez Sánchez became the seventh qualifiers.

Andreja Klepač and María José Martínez Sánchez paired together in the season's beginning. The duo played moderately in most tournaments. In Miami, the pair achieved its first notable success by beating Mattek-Sands/Šafářová on their way to reach the quarterfinals. They improved somewhat in late summer, achieving one of their best results this year by fighting through the quarterfinals of the US Open. This was followed by a triumph at the Tokyo Pan Pacific Open and a quarterfinal entry at the China Open.

For Klepač, it will be her debut at the Finals. Martínez Sánchez once appeared in the Tour Championships and won it with Nuria Llagostera Vives in 2009.

- On 18 October, Kiki Bertens and Johanna Larsson became the eighth and last team to qualify.

Kiki Bertens and Johanna Larsson have regularly partnered together since 2015. In the 2017 season, they claimed their first trophy in the ASB Classic. Overall, Bertens and Larsson were mainly successful in low rank tournaments, having won three more titles. Beside that, they reached the quarterfinals at the Mutua Madrid Open. They twice reached the 4th Round at the French Open and US Open.

For both players, it will be their debut at the Finals.

== Groupings ==
=== Singles ===
The 2017 edition of the year–end finals will feature the current world No. 1, three major champions and three major finalists. The competitors were divided into two groups, representing the colors of the flag of Singapore.

Red group:
Simona Halep, Elina Svitolina, Caroline Wozniacki & Caroline Garcia
White group:
Garbiñe Muguruza, Karolína Plíšková, Venus Williams & Jeļena Ostapenko

== Day-by-day summaries ==
=== Day 1 (22 October) ===
Matches
Event	Group	Winner	Loser	Score
Singles round robin	White Group	(Czech Republic) Karolína Plíšková [3]	(United States) Venus Williams [5]	6–2, 6–2
Singles round robin	White Group	(Spain) Garbiñe Muguruza [2]	(Latvia) Jeļena Ostapenko [7]	6–3, 6–4

=== Day 2 (23 October) ===
Matches
Event	Group	Winner	Loser	Score
Singles round robin	Red Group	(Romania) Simona Halep [1]	(France) Caroline Garcia [8]	6–4, 6–2
Singles round robin	Red Group	(Denmark) Caroline Wozniacki [6]	(Ukraine) Elina Svitolina [4]	6–2, 6–0

=== Day 3 (24 October) ===
Matches
Event	Group	Winner	Loser	Score
Singles round robin	White Group	(United States) Venus Williams [5]	(Latvia) Jeļena Ostapenko [7]	7–5, 6–7^{(3–7)}, 7–5
Singles round robin	White Group	(Czech Republic) Karolína Plíšková [3]	(Spain) Garbiñe Muguruza [2]	6–2, 6–2

=== Day 4 (25 October) ===
Matches
Event	Group	Winner	Loser	Score
Singles round robin	Red Group	(Denmark) Caroline Wozniacki [6]	(Romania) Simona Halep [1]	6–0, 6–2
Singles round robin	Red Group	(France) Caroline Garcia [8]	(Ukraine) Elina Svitolina [4]	6–7^{(7–9)}, 6–3, 7–5

=== Day 5 (26 October) ===
Matches
Event	Group	Winner	Loser	Score
Day Session
Doubles Elimination	Quarterfinals	(Hungary) Tímea Babos (Czech Republic) Andrea Hlaváčková [3]	(Slovenia) Andreja Klepač (Spain) María José Martínez Sánchez [7]	6–3, 6–4
Singles round robin	White Group	(Latvia) Jeļena Ostapenko [7]	(Czech Republic) Karolína Plíšková [3]	6–3, 6–1
Evening Session
Singles round robin	White Group	(United States) Venus Williams [5]	(Spain) Garbiñe Muguruza [2]	7–5, 6–4
Doubles Elimination	Quarterfinals	(Chinese Taipei) Chan Yung-jan (Switzerland) Martina Hingis [1]	(Germany) Anna-Lena Grönefeld (Czech Republic) Květa Peschke [6]	6–3, 6–2

=== Day 6 (27 October) ===
Matches
Event	Group	Winner	Loser	Score
Day Session
Doubles Elimination	Quarterfinals	(Netherlands) Kiki Bertens (Sweden) Johanna Larsson [8]	(Australia) Ashleigh Barty (Australia) Casey Dellacqua [3]	7–6^{(9–7)}, 6–7^{(1–7)}, [10–6]
Singles round robin	Red Group	(France) Caroline Garcia [8]	(Denmark) Caroline Wozniacki [6]	0–6, 6–3, 7–5
Evening Session
Singles round robin	Red Group	(Ukraine) Elina Svitolina [4]	(Romania) Simona Halep [1]	6–3, 6–4
Doubles Elimination	Quarterfinals	(Russia) Ekaterina Makarova (Russia) Elena Vesnina [2]	(Canada) Gabriela Dabrowski (China) Xu Yifan [6]	6–1, 6–1

=== Day 7 (28 October) ===
Matches
Event	Winner	Loser	Score
Day Session
Doubles Semifinals	(Hungary) Tímea Babos (Czech Republic) Andrea Hlaváčková [3]	(Chinese Taipei) Chan Yung-jan (Switzerland) Martina Hingis [1]	6–4, 7–6^{(7–5)}
Singles Semifinals	(Denmark) Caroline Wozniacki [6]	(Czech Republic) Karolína Plíšková [3]	7–6^{(11–9)}, 6–3
Evening Session
Singles Semifinals	(United States) Venus Williams [5]	(France) Caroline Garcia [8]	6–7^{(3–7)}, 6–2, 6–3
Doubles Semifinals	(Netherlands) Kiki Bertens (Sweden) Johanna Larsson [8]	(Russia) Ekaterina Makarova (Russia) Elena Vesnina [2]	6–4, 6–3

=== Day 8 (29 October) ===
Matches
Event	Winner	Loser	Score
Doubles Final	(Hungary) Tímea Babos (Czech Republic) Andrea Hlaváčková [3]	(Netherlands) Kiki Bertens (Sweden) Johanna Larsson [8]	4–6, 6–4, [10–5]
Singles Final	(Denmark) Caroline Wozniacki [6]	(United States) Venus Williams [5]	6–4, 6–4

== Points breakdown ==
WTA players qualify for the WTA Finals by competing throughout the year in WTA tournaments throughout the world, as well as the four Grand Slam events. Players earn ranking points on the Porsche Race To Singapore leaderboard, and the top 7 singles players (and usually top 8) and top 8 doubles teams on this leaderboard at the conclusion of the year (as of the Monday following the final regular season tournament) earn the right to compete in the WTA Championships.

For singles, all results from that year count towards a player's ranking; for doubles, only the best 11 results for a team from that year count towards the team's ranking. The eighth spot in singles is not guaranteed a place in the finals as the WTA has some leeway per the WTA rules.

=== Singles ===
Players in gold have qualified. Players in brown have withdrawn from consideration from playing the tournament.

Rank	Athlete	Grand Slam tournament				Premier Mandatory				Best Premier 5		Best other						Total points	Tourn	Titles
Rank	Athlete	AUS	FRA	WIM	USO	INW	MIA	MAD	BEI	1	2	1	2	3	4	5	6	Total points	Tourn	Titles
1	(Romania) Simona Halep	R128; 10	F 1300	QF; 430	R128; 10	R32; 65	QF; 215	W 1000	F 650	F 585	F 585	SF; 350	SF; 185	QF; 100	QF; 100	QF; 60	R16; 30	5,675	17	1
2	(Spain) Garbiñe Muguruza	QF; 430	R16; 240	W 2000	R16; 240	QF; 215	R16; 120	R64; 10	R64; 10	W 900	SF; 350	QF; 190	QF; 190	SF; 185	SF; 185	SF; 185	SF; 185	5,635	20	2
3	(Czech Republic) Karolína Plíšková	QF; 430	SF; 780	R64; 70	QF; 430	SF; 390	SF; 390	R32; 65	R16; 120	SF; 350	QF; 190	W 470	W 470	W 470	QF; 190	QF; 190	QF; 100	5,105	19	3
4	(Ukraine) Elina Svitolina	R32; 130	QF; 430	R16; 240	R16; 240	R16; 120	R64; 10	R64; 10	QF; 215	W 900	W 900	W 900	W 280	W 280	SF; 185	R16; 105	R16; 55	5,000	17	5
5	(United States) Venus Williams	F 1300	R16; 240	F 1300	SF; 780	QF; 215	SF; 390	A 0	A 0	QF; 190	R16; 105	R32; 60	R16; 30	R16; 30	R16; 1	R32; 1		4,642	13	0
6	(Denmark) Caroline Wozniacki	R32; 130	QF; 430	R16; 240	R64; 70	QF; 215	F 650	R32; 65	R16; 120	F 585	F 585	W 470	F 305	F 305	QF; 190	F 180	QF; 100	4,640	21	1
7	(Latvia) Jeļena Ostapenko	R32; 130	W 2000	QF; 430	R32; 130	R64; 35	R128; 10	R32; 25†	SF; 390	SF; 350	R32; 90	F 305	W 280	SF; 110	SF; 110	QF; 60	R16; 55	4,510	20	2
8	(France) Caroline Garcia	R32; 130	QF; 430	R16; 240	R32; 130	R16; 120	R64; 10	R64; 10	W 1000	W 900	QF; 190	SF; 110	SF; 110	SF; 110	SF; 110	QF; 100	F 95	3,795	23	2
Alternates
9	(United Kingdom) Johanna Konta	QF; 430	R128; 10	SF; 780	R128; 10	R32; 65	W 1000	R64; 10	R64; 10	QF; 190	A 0	W 470	SF; 185	F 180	SF; 110	R16; 105	R16; 55	3,610	19	2
10	(France) Kristina Mladenovic	R128; 10	QF; 430	R64; 70	R128; 10	SF; 390	R64; 10	F 650	R64; 10	R16; 105	R16; 30‡	W 470	F 305	F 180	QF; 100	QF; 60	R16; 55	2,885	22	1
11	(Russia) Svetlana Kuznetsova	R16; 240	R16; 240	QF; 430	R64; 70	F 650	R16; 120	SF; 390	R64; 10	QF; 190	R16; 105	QF; 100	QF; 100	QF; 100	R16; 55	R16; 55	R32; 1	2,856	16	0

† The player's ranking at the time did not qualify her to play this event. Accordingly, the player's next best result is counted in its place.

‡ The player was not a Top 20 player at the end of 2016 and therefore not required to count her two best Premier 5 results. Accordingly, the player's next best result is counted in its place.

=== Doubles ===
Teams in gold have qualified. Teams in brown have withdrawn from consideration from playing the tournament even if they qualify. Teams in dark gold withdrew after qualifying. Teams in dark brown have one player that qualified separately with another partner, making the team ineligible to qualify.

Rank	Team	Points											Total Points	Tourn	Titles
Rank	Team	1	2	3	4	5	6	7	8	9	10	11	Total Points	Tourn	Titles
1	Chan Yung-jan (TPE); Martina Hingis (SUI)	W 2000	W 1000	W 1000	W 1000	W 900	W 900	W 900	SF; 780	W 470	QF; 430	SF; 390	9,770	15	9
2	Ekaterina Makarova (RUS); Elena Vesnina (RUS)	W 2000	W 900	W 900	F 585	QF; 430	QF; 430	SF; 390	SF; 390	F 305	R16; 240	QF; 215	6,785	14	3
—	Bethanie Mattek-Sands (USA); Lucie Šafářová (CZE)	W 2000	W 2000	W 470	SF; 390	R32; 130	R16; 120	R16; 10					5,120	7	3
3	Ashleigh Barty (AUS); Casey Dellacqua (AUS)	F 1300	W 470	QF; 430	QF; 430	SF; 350	F 305	F 305	W 280	W 280	QF; 190	R32; 130	4,470	16	3
4	Tímea Babos (HUN); Andrea Hlaváčková (CZE)	F 650	F 650	W 470	QF; 430	SF; 350	W 280	W 280	W 280	R16; 240	QF; 190	SF; 185	4,005	15	4
—	Lucie Hradecká (CZE); Kateřina Siniaková (CZE)	F 1300	SF; 780	F 650	F 305	R16; 240	QF; 215	F 180	F 180	R64; 10	R32; 10	R16; 1	3,871	14	0
5	Anna-Lena Grönefeld (GER); Květa Peschke (CZE)	SF; 780	F 585	W 280	R16; 240	QF; 215	QF; 190	SF; 185	SF; 185	R16; 120	R16; 120	R16; 105	3,005	22	1
6	Gabriela Dabrowski (CAN); Xu Yifan (CHN)	W 1000	W 470	QF; 430	R16; 240	QF; 215	QF; 190	SF; 185	R16; 120	QF; 60	R64; 10	R32; 1	2,921	14	2
—	Andrea Hlaváčková (CZE); Peng Shuai (CHN)	F 1300	F 585	SF; 390	W 280	R16; 120	QF; 100	R16; 1					2,776	7	1
7	Andreja Klepač (SLO); María José Martínez Sánchez (ESP)	W 470	QF; 430	R16; 240	R16; 240	R16; 240	QF; 215	QF; 215	SF; 185	R16; 120	SF; 110	R16; 105	2,570	23	1
8	Kiki Bertens (NED); Johanna Larsson (SWE)	W 280	W 280	W 280	W 280	R16; 240	R16; 240	QF; 215	R32; 130	R16; 120	R16; 105	QF; 100	2,270	14	4
Alternate
–	Sania Mirza (IND); Peng Shuai (CHN)	SF; 780	SF; 390	SF; 350	SF; 350	QF; 190							2,060	5	0
9	Shuko Aoyama (JPN); Yang Zhaoxuan (CHN)	F 585	W 280	R16; 240	QF; 215	W 150	R32; 130	R16; 120	SF; 110	QF; 100	QF; 60	R64; 10	2,000	15	2

== Player head-to-head ==
Below are the head-to-head records as they approached the tournament.

2017 WTA Finals – Singles

		Halep	Muguruza	Plíšková	Svitolina	Williams	Wozniacki	Ostapenko	Garcia	Overall	YTD
1	(Romania) Simona Halep		1–3	5–1	3–2	1–3	2–3	1–1	2–1	14–14	44–15
2	(Spain) Garbiñe Muguruza	3–1		2–6	3–4	2–3	3–3	2–1	1–0	16–18	46–19
3	(Czech Republic) Karolína Plíšková	1–5	6–2		5–1	1–1	3–5	2–0	3–2	21–16	51–16
4	(Ukraine) Elina Svitolina	2–3	4–3	1–5		1–1	3–0	0–1	1–1	12–13	52–12
5	(United States) Venus Williams	3–1	3–2	1–1	1–1		7–0	1–0	1–1	17–6	35–12
6	(Denmark) Caroline Wozniacki	3–2	3–3	5–3	0–3	0–7		0–4	2–0	13–22	56–20
7	(Latvia) Jeļena Ostapenko	1–1	1–2	0–2	1–0	0–1	4–0		0–0	7–6	47–18
8	(France) Caroline Garcia	1–2	0–1	2–3	1–1	1–1	0–2	0–0		5–10	46–20

== See also ==
- 2017 WTA Tour
- 2017 WTA Elite Trophy
- 2017 ATP World Tour Finals
