= 2017 WTA Finals – Singles =

Singles
- 2017 WTA Finals

Final
- Champion: (Denmark) Caroline Wozniacki
- Runner-up: (United States) Venus Williams
- Score: 6–4, 6–4

Details
- Draw: 8 (RR + elimination)
- Seeds: 8

Events
Singles	Doubles
- WTA Finals

Caroline Wozniacki defeated Venus Williams in the final, 6–4, 6–4 to win the singles tennis title at the 2017 WTA Finals. Williams became the oldest player to reach the final at 37 years, 4 months and 12 days old. Wozniacki also ended a seven-match losing streak to Williams with the win.

Dominika Cibulková was the defending champion, but failed to qualify this year.

The top seven seeds all had the chance to attain the year-end world No. 1 ranking. Newly crowned No. 1 Simona Halep secured the position after Karolína Plíšková lost in the semifinals.

Caroline Garcia, Jeļena Ostapenko, and Elina Svitolina made their debuts in the event.

== Seeds ==
1. (Romania) Simona Halep (round robin)
2. (Spain) Garbiñe Muguruza (round robin)
3. (Czech Republic) Karolína Plíšková (semifinals)
4. (Ukraine) Elina Svitolina (round robin)
5. (United States) Venus Williams (final)
6. (Denmark) Caroline Wozniacki (champion)
7. (Latvia) Jeļena Ostapenko (round robin)
8. (France) Caroline Garcia (semifinals)

== Alternates ==
1. (France) Kristina Mladenovic (Did not play)
2. (Russia) Svetlana Kuznetsova (Did not play)

== Draw ==
Key

- Q = Qualifier
- WC = Wild card
- LL = Lucky loser
- Alt = Alternate
- ITF = ITF entry
- PR = Protected ranking
- SR = Special ranking
- SE = Special exempt
- JE = Junior exempt
- JR = Junior Accelerator Programme entrant
- CO = College Accelerator Programme entrant
- NG = Next Gen Accelerator Program entrant
- w/o = Walkover
- r = Retired
- d = Defaulted

=== Finals ===
Semifinals
8	(France) Caroline Garcia	7^{7}	2	3
5	(United States) Venus Williams	6^{3}	6	6
3	(Czech Republic) Karolína Plíšková	6^{9}	3
6	(Denmark) Caroline Wozniacki	7^{11}	6

Final
5	(United States) Venus Williams	4	4
6	(Denmark) Caroline Wozniacki	6	6

=== Red group ===
		(Romania) Halep	(Ukraine) Svitolina	(Denmark) Wozniacki	(France) Garcia	RR; W–L	Set; W–L	Game; W–L	Standings
1	(Romania) Simona Halep		3–6, 4–6	0–6, 2–6	6–4, 6–2	1–2	2–4 (33%)	21–30 (41%)	4
4	(Ukraine) Elina Svitolina	6–3, 6–4		2–6, 0–6	7–6^{(9–7)}, 3–6, 5–7	1–2	3–4 (42%)	29–38 (43%)	3
6	(Denmark) Caroline Wozniacki	6–0, 6–2	6–2, 6–0		6–0, 3–6, 5–7	2–1	5–2 (71%)	38–17 (69%)	2
8	(France) Caroline Garcia	4–6, 2–6	6–7^{(7–9)}, 6–3, 7–5	0–6, 6–3, 7–5		2–1	4–4 (50%)	38–41 (48%)	1

=== White group ===
		(Spain) Muguruza	(Czech Republic) Plíšková	(United States) Williams	(Latvia) Ostapenko	RR; W–L	Set; W–L	Game; W–L	Standings
2	(Spain) Garbiñe Muguruza		2–6, 2–6	5–7, 4–6	6–3, 6–4	1–2	2–4 (33%)	25–32 (44%)	3
3	(Czech Republic) Karolína Plíšková	6–2, 6–2		6–2, 6–2	3–6, 1–6	2–1	4–2 (67%)	28–20 (58%)	1
5	(United States) Venus Williams	7–5, 6–4	2–6, 2–6		7–5, 6–7^{(3–7)}, 7–5	2–1	4–3 (57%)	37–38 (49%)	2
7	(Latvia) Jeļena Ostapenko	3–6, 4–6	6–3, 6–1	5–7, 7–6^{(7–3)}, 5–7		1–2	3–4 (43%)	36–36 (50%)	4

Standings are determined by: 1. number of wins; 2. number of matches; 3. in two-player ties, head-to-head records; 4. in three-player ties, (a) percentage of sets won (head-to-head records if two players remain tied), then (b) percentage of games won (head-to-head records if two players remain tied), then (c) WTA rankings.
