= 2017 Miami Open – Women's doubles =

Women's doubles
- 2017 Miami Open

Final
- Champions: (Canada) Gabriela Dabrowski (China) Xu Yifan
- Runners-up: (India) Sania Mirza (Czech Republic) Barbora Strýcová
- Score: 6–4, 6–3

Events
Singles	men	women
Doubles	men	women
← 2016 ·	Miami Open	· 2018 →

Bethanie Mattek-Sands and Lucie Šafářová were the defending champions, but lost in the second round to Andreja Klepač and María José Martínez Sánchez.

Gabriela Dabrowski and Xu Yifan won the title, defeating Sania Mirza and Barbora Strýcová in the final, 6–4, 6–3.

Mattek-Sands retained the No. 1 doubles ranking after the other contenders for the top ranking at the beginning of the tournament (Kristina Mladenovic, Ekaterina Makarova and Elena Vesnina) all lost in the quarterfinals.

== Seeds ==
1. (United States) Bethanie Mattek-Sands / (Czech Republic) Lucie Šafářová (second round)
2. (Russia) Ekaterina Makarova / (Russia) Elena Vesnina (quarterfinals)
3. (India) Sania Mirza / (Czech Republic) Barbora Strýcová (final)
4. (Czech Republic) Andrea Hlaváčková / (China) Peng Shuai (semifinals)
5. (Chinese Taipei) Chan Yung-jan / (Switzerland) Martina Hingis (semifinals)
6. (United States) Vania King / (Kazakhstan) Yaroslava Shvedova (quarterfinals)
7. (United States) Raquel Atawo / (Chinese Taipei) Chan Hao-ching (second round)
8. (United States) Abigail Spears / (Slovenia) Katarina Srebotnik (first round)

== Draw ==
=== Key ===
- Q = Qualifier
- WC = Wild card
- LL = Lucky loser
- Alt = Alternate
- SE = Special exempt
- PR = Protected ranking
- ITF = ITF entry
- JE = Junior exempt
- w/o = Walkover
- r = Retired
- d = Defaulted
- SR = Special ranking

=== Finals ===
Semifinals
5	(Chinese Taipei) Chan Yung-jan (Switzerland) Martina Hingis	7^{8}	1	[4]
3	(India) Sania Mirza (Czech Republic) Barbora Strýcová	6^{6}	6	[10]
4	(Czech Republic) Andrea Hlaváčková (China) Peng Shuai	5	7	[7]
(Canada) Gabriela Dabrowski (China) Xu Yifan	7	5	[10]

Final
3	(India) Sania Mirza (Czech Republic) Barbora Strýcová	4	3
(Canada) Gabriela Dabrowski (China) Xu Yifan	6	6

=== Top half ===
First round
1	(United States) B Mattek-Sands (Czech Republic) L Šafářová	6	6
WC	(Serbia) J Janković (United States) T Townsend	4	1
(Romania) R Olaru (Ukraine) O Savchuk	2	4
(Slovenia) A Klepač (Spain) MJ Martínez Sánchez	6	6
(Australia) A Barty (Australia) C Dellacqua	6	6
(Croatia) M Lučić-Baroni (United States) C Vandeweghe	2	1
(Czech Republic) L Hradecká (Czech Republic) K Siniaková	7	5	[7]
5	(Chinese Taipei) Y-j Chan (Switzerland) M Hingis	5	7	[10]
3	(India) S Mirza (Czech Republic) B Strýcová	6	7^{7}
(Netherlands) D Schuurs (Czech Republic) R Voráčová	3	6^{3}
WC	(Croatia) A Tomljanović (United Kingdom) H Watson	3	1
(Hungary) T Babos (Russia) A Pavlyuchenkova	6	6
(Croatia) D Jurak (Australia) An Rodionova	7	1	[10]
(United States) C McHale (Poland) A Rosolska	5	6	[8]
Alt	(United States) L Davis (United States) N Melichar	7	4	[3]
6	(United States) V King (Kazakhstan) Y Shvedova	5	6	[10]

Second round
1	(United States) B Mattek-Sands (Czech Republic) L Šafářová	4	1
(Slovenia) A Klepač (Spain) MJ Martínez Sánchez	6	6
(Australia) A Barty (Australia) C Dellacqua	2	3
5	(Chinese Taipei) Y-j Chan (Switzerland) M Hingis	6	6
3	(India) S Mirza (Czech Republic) B Strýcová	1	6	[10]
(Hungary) T Babos (Russia) A Pavlyuchenkova	6	1	[4]
(Croatia) D Jurak (Australia) An Rodionova	5	2
6	(United States) V King (Kazakhstan) Y Shvedova	7	6

Quarterfinals
(Slovenia) A Klepač (Spain) MJ Martínez Sánchez	4	2
5	(Chinese Taipei) Y-j Chan (Switzerland) M Hingis	6	6
3	(India) S Mirza (Czech Republic) B Strýcová	6	6
6	(United States) V King (Kazakhstan) Y Shvedova	4	1

Semifinals
5	(Chinese Taipei) Y-j Chan (Switzerland) M Hingis	7^{8}	1	[4]
3	(India) S Mirza (Czech Republic) B Strýcová	6^{6}	6	[10]

=== Bottom half ===
First round
7	(United States) R Atawo (Chinese Taipei) H-c Chan	7^{7}	1
(Australia) S Stosur (China) S Zhang	6^{4}	2^{r}
(Australia) D Gavrilova (United Kingdom) J Konta	3	3
(Russia) S Kuznetsova (France) K Mladenovic	6	6
(Switzerland) X Knoll (Serbia) A Krunić	6	4	[9]
(Japan) S Aoyama (China) Z Yang	4	6	[11]
WC	(Japan) N Osaka (Puerto Rico) M Puig	6^{6}	1
4	(Czech Republic) A Hlaváčková (China) S Peng	7^{8}	6
8	(United States) A Spears (Slovenia) K Srebotnik	2	6	[7]
(Canada) G Dabrowski (China) Y Xu	6	3	[10]
(Germany) J Görges (Latvia) J Ostapenko	6^{3}	6^{3}
(Spain) L Arruabarrena (China) C Liang	7^{7}	7^{7}
(Germany) A-L Grönefeld (Czech Republic) K Peschke	6	6
(Italy) S Errani (Romania) M Niculescu	4	3
(Georgia (country)) O Kalashnikova (United States) A Muhammad	0	2
2	(Russia) E Makarova (Russia) E Vesnina	6	6

Second round
7	(United States) R Atawo (Chinese Taipei) H-c Chan	6	5	[1]
(Russia) S Kuznetsova (France) K Mladenovic	0	7	[10]
(Japan) S Aoyama (China) Z Yang	7	0	[10]
4	(Czech Republic) A Hlaváčková (China) S Peng	5	6	[12]
(Canada) G Dabrowski (China) Y Xu	6	7
(Spain) L Arruabarrena (China) C Liang	1	5
(Germany) A-L Grönefeld (Czech Republic) K Peschke	0	2
2	(Russia) E Makarova (Russia) E Vesnina	6	6

Quarterfinals
(Russia) S Kuznetsova (France) K Mladenovic	1	4
4	(Czech Republic) A Hlaváčková (China) S Peng	6	6
(Canada) G Dabrowski (China) Y Xu	7^{7}	6
2	(Russia) E Makarova (Russia) E Vesnina	6^{3}	1

Semifinals
4	(Czech Republic) A Hlaváčková (China) S Peng	5	7	[7]
(Canada) G Dabrowski (China) Y Xu	7	5	[10]
