= 2017 Miami Open – Men's singles =

Tennis tournament

Men's singles
- 2017 Miami Open

Final
- Champion: (Switzerland) Roger Federer
- Runner-up: (Spain) Rafael Nadal
- Score: 6–3, 6–4

Details
- Draw: 96 (12 Q / 5 WC )
- Seeds: 32

Events
Singles	men	women
Doubles	men	women
← 2016 ·	Miami Open	· 2018 →

Roger Federer defeated Rafael Nadal in the final, 6–3, 6–4 to win the men's singles tennis title at the 2017 Miami Open. It was Federer's third Miami Open title, and he claimed his third Sunshine Double with the win. It was also the fourth straight year the men's champion completed the Sunshine Double, after Novak Djokovic did so between 2014 and 2016. Federer saved two match points en route to the title, in the quarterfinals against Tomáš Berdych. It was Nadal's fifth runner-up finish without winning the title.

Djokovic was the three-time reigning champion, but withdrew before the tournament due to a right elbow injury. Reigning world No. 1 Andy Murray also withdrew before the tournament due to a right elbow injury. This marked the first time since 1990, when the Masters tournaments were created, that neither the world No. 1 nor No. 2 played the Miami Open, and the first time since the 2005 Madrid Masters that neither Djokovic nor Murray featured in the main draw of a Masters event.

Stan Wawrinka was the first player other than a member of the Big Four to be the top seed at a Masters 1000 event since Andy Roddick at the 2005 Rome Masters.

== Seeds ==
All seeds receive a bye into the second round.

1. (Switzerland) Stan Wawrinka (fourth round)
2. (Japan) Kei Nishikori (quarterfinals)
3. (Canada) Milos Raonic (third round, withdrew due to a hamstring injury)
4. (Switzerland) Roger Federer (champion)
5. (Spain) Rafael Nadal (final)
6. (Austria) Dominic Thiem (second round)
7. (Croatia) Marin Čilić (second round)
8. (Belgium) David Goffin (fourth round)
9. (Bulgaria) Grigor Dimitrov (second round)
10. (Czech Republic) Tomáš Berdych (quarterfinals)
11. (France) Lucas Pouille (second round)
12. (Australia) Nick Kyrgios (semifinals)
13. (United States) Jack Sock (quarterfinals)
14. (Spain) Roberto Bautista Agut (fourth round)
15. (Spain) Pablo Carreño Busta (second round)
16. (Germany) Alexander Zverev (quarterfinals)

17. (Croatia) Ivo Karlović (third round)
18. (United States) John Isner (third round)
19. (Spain) Albert Ramos Viñolas (second round)
20. (France) Gilles Simon (second round)
21. (Uruguay) Pablo Cuevas (second round)
22. (United States) Sam Querrey (third round)
23. (United States) Steve Johnson (second round)
24. (Luxembourg) Gilles Müller (third round)
25. (Spain) Fernando Verdasco (third round)
26. (Germany) Philipp Kohlschreiber (third round)
27. (Spain) David Ferrer (second round)
28. (Germany) Mischa Zverev (second round)
29. (Argentina) Juan Martín del Potro (third round)
30. (Portugal) João Sousa (second round)
31. (Spain) Feliciano López (second round)
32. (Italy) Paolo Lorenzi (second round)

Click on the seed number of a player to go to their draw section.

== Draw ==
=== Key ===
- Q = Qualifier
- WC = Wild card
- LL = Lucky loser
- Alt = Alternate
- ITF = ITF entry
- PR = Protected ranking
- SR = Special ranking
- SE = Special exempt
- JE = Junior exempt
- JR = Junior Accelerator Programme entrant
- CO = College Accelerator Programme entrant
- NG = Next Gen Accelerator Program entrant
- w/o = Walkover
- r = Retired
- d = Defaulted

=== Finals ===
Quarterfinals
16	(Germany) Alexander Zverev	4	7^{11}	3
12	(Australia) Nick Kyrgios	6	6^{9}	6
4	(Switzerland) Roger Federer	6	3	7^{8}
10	(Czech Republic) Tomáš Berdych	2	6	6^{6}
5	(Spain) Rafael Nadal	6	6
13	(United States) Jack Sock	2	3
(Italy) Fabio Fognini	6	6
2	(Japan) Kei Nishikori	4	2

Semifinals
12	(Australia) Nick Kyrgios	6^{9}	7^{11}	6^{5}
4	(Switzerland) Roger Federer	7^{11}	6^{9}	7^{7}
5	(Spain) Rafael Nadal	6	7
(Italy) Fabio Fognini	1	5

Final
4	(Switzerland) Roger Federer	6	6
5	(Spain) Rafael Nadal	3	4

=== Top half ===
==== Section 1 ====
First round
(Portugal) G Elias	7^{7}	2	5
(Argentina) H Zeballos	6^{2}	6	7
(Ukraine) A Dolgopolov	6^{4}	0^{r}
(Tunisia) M Jaziri	7^{7}	0
WC	(Brazil) T Bellucci	7^{7}	6
(France) S Robert	6^{5}	2
WC	(Norway) C Ruud	2	1
(Chinese Taipei) Y-h Lu	6	6

Second round
1	(Switzerland) S Wawrinka	6	6
(Argentina) H Zeballos	3	4
(Tunisia) M Jaziri	6	4	6
31	(Spain) F López	3	6	3
18	(United States) J Isner	7	7^{7}
WC	(Brazil) T Bellucci	5	6^{5}
(Chinese Taipei) Y-h Lu	0	3
16	(Germany) A Zverev	6	6

Third round
1	(Switzerland) S Wawrinka	6	6
(Tunisia) M Jaziri	3	4
18	(United States) J Isner	7^{7}	6^{7}	6^{5}
16	(Germany) A Zverev	6^{5}	7^{9}	7^{7}

Fourth round
1	(Switzerland) S Wawrinka	6	2	1
16	(Germany) A Zverev	4	6	6

==== Section 2 ====
First round
(Bosnia and Herzegovina) D Džumhur	3	6	7^{7}
(South Korea) H Chung	6	1	6^{1}
(Uzbekistan) D Istomin	4	6^{0}
(Russia) A Kuznetsov	6	7^{7}
(Russia) K Khachanov	4	6	6^{4}
(Argentina) D Schwartzman	6	3	7^{7}
Q	(Barbados) D King	7^{7}	6
Q	(Slovakia) L Lacko	6^{2}	4

Second round
12	(Australia) N Kyrgios	6	6
(Bosnia and Herzegovina) D Džumhur	4	3
(Russia) A Kuznetsov	6^{4}	1
17	(Croatia) I Karlović	7^{7}	6
27	(Spain) D Ferrer	2	3
(Argentina) D Schwartzman	6	6
Q	(Barbados) D King	5	1
8	(Belgium) D Goffin	7	6

Third round
12	(Australia) N Kyrgios	6	6^{4}	7^{7}
17	(Croatia) I Karlović	4	7^{7}	6^{2}
(Argentina) D Schwartzman	6	3	5
8	(Belgium) D Goffin	4	6	7

Fourth round
12	(Australia) N Kyrgios	7^{7}	6
8	(Belgium) D Goffin	6^{5}	3

==== Section 3 ====
First round
Q	(United States) F Tiafoe	7	5	6
(Russia) K Kravchuk	5	7	1
(Netherlands) R Haase	7	7^{7}
WC	(Sweden) M Ymer	5	6^{3}
(Georgia (country)) N Basilashvili	6	4	2
PR	(Spain) T Robredo	3	6	6
LL	(Russia) M Youzhny	4	1
Q	(Kazakhstan) M Kukushkin	6	6

Second round
4	(Switzerland) R Federer	7^{7}	6
Q	(United States) F Tiafoe	6^{2}	3
(Netherlands) R Haase	2	4
29	(Argentina) JM del Potro	6	6
22	(United States) S Querrey	6	6
PR	(Spain) T Robredo	2	3
Q	(Kazakhstan) M Kukushkin	3	6^{3}
14	(Spain) R Bautista Agut	6	7^{7}

Third round
4	(Switzerland) R Federer	6	6
29	(Argentina) JM del Potro	3	4
22	(United States) S Querrey	6	2	3
14	(Spain) R Bautista Agut	3	6	6

Fourth round
4	(Switzerland) R Federer	7^{7}	7^{7}
14	(Spain) R Bautista Agut	6^{5}	6^{4}

==== Section 4 ====
First round
WC	(Russia) A Rublev	6	6
(Germany) F Mayer	1	1
Q	(Moldova) R Albot	4	4
(Italy) A Seppi	6	6
(France) A Mannarino	7^{8}	6
Q	(Germany) B Becker	6^{6}	3
(Spain) M Granollers	6^{6}	6	3
(Croatia) B Ćorić	7^{8}	4	6

Second round
10	(Czech Republic) T Berdych	6	6
WC	(Russia) A Rublev	3	2
(Italy) A Seppi	6^{3}	6^{1}
24	(Luxembourg) G Müller	7^{7}	7^{7}
32	(Italy) P Lorenzi	4	6	2
(France) A Mannarino	6	3	6
(Croatia) B Ćorić	6	7
6	(Austria) D Thiem	1	5

Third round
10	(Czech Republic) T Berdych	6	6
24	(Luxembourg) G Müller	3	4
(France) A Mannarino	6	2	7^{7}
(Croatia) B Ćorić	4	6	6^{3}

Fourth round
10	(Czech Republic) T Berdych	6	7
(France) A Mannarino	3	5

=== Bottom half ===
==== Section 5 ====
First round
Q	(United States) C Harrison	1	1
(Israel) D Sela	6	6
(Czech Republic) A Pavlásek	2	3
(United States) T Fritz	6	6
WC	(United States) M Mmoh	3	2
(France) N Mahut	6	6
(Argentina) G Pella	3	6	7^{7}
Q	(United States) T Smyczek	6	4	6^{3}

Second round
5	(Spain) R Nadal	6	6
(Israel) D Sela	3	4
(United States) T Fritz	5	6	6^{4}
26	(Germany) P Kohlschreiber	7	3	7^{7}
23	(United States) S Johnson	4	7	4
(France) N Mahut	6	5	6
(Argentina) G Pella	6	7^{7}
9	(Bulgaria) G Dimitrov	3	6^{4}

Third round
5	(Spain) R Nadal	0	6	6
26	(Germany) P Kohlschreiber	6	2	3
(France) N Mahut	6	6
(Argentina) G Pella	4	3

Fourth round
5	(Spain) R Nadal	6	7^{7}
(France) N Mahut	4	6^{4}

==== Section 6 ====
First round
(Japan) Y Nishioka	1	6	6
(Australia) J Thompson	6	4	3
(Czech Republic) J Veselý	6^{5}	6	7
PR	(Germany) T Haas	7^{7}	3	5
Q	(United States) J Donaldson	2	7^{7}	6
(United Kingdom) K Edmund	6	6^{4}	2
(Serbia) V Troicki	5	6	6
(Brazil) T Monteiro	7	3	1

Second round
13	(United States) J Sock	2
(Japan) Y Nishioka	4^{r}
(Czech Republic) J Veselý	7^{7}	4	6
19	(Spain) A Ramos Viñolas	6^{5}	6	3
28	(Germany) M Zverev	4	4
Q	(United States) J Donaldson	6	6
(Serbia) V Troicki	3	5
3	(Canada) M Raonic	6	7

Third round
13	(United States) J Sock	6	7^{7}
(Czech Republic) J Veselý	3	6^{0}
Q	(United States) J Donaldson	w/o
3	(Canada) M Raonic

Fourth round
13	(United States) J Sock	6	6
Q	(United States) J Donaldson	2	1

==== Section 7 ====
First round
(France) J Chardy	6	6
(Argentina) F Bagnis	2	2
(Italy) F Fognini	6	7
(United States) R Harrison	4	5
(Slovakia) M Kližan	6^{4}	3
(France) B Paire	7^{7}	6
(United States) D Young	6	1	6
(Germany) D Brown	3	6	2

Second round
7	(Croatia) M Čilić	4	6	3
(France) J Chardy	6	2	6
(Italy) F Fognini	7^{10}	2	6
30	(Portugal) J Sousa	6^{8}	6	3
21	(Uruguay) P Cuevas	5	0
(France) B Paire	7	6
(United States) D Young	6	6
11	(France) L Pouille	2	4

Third round
(France) J Chardy	6	4	4
(Italy) F Fognini	3	6	6
(France) B Paire	6^{2}	4
(United States) D Young	7^{7}	6

Fourth round
(Italy) F Fognini	6	6
(United States) D Young	0	4

==== Section 8 ====
First round
(Argentina) J Mónaco	5	6^{4}
(Argentina) F Delbonis	7	7^{7}
Q	(United Kingdom) A Bedene	5	0^{r}
(Germany) J-L Struff	7	4
Q	(United States) E Escobedo	7	0	6
(United Kingdom) D Evans	5	6	3
(South Africa) K Anderson	6	7
Q	(Serbia) D Lajović	2	5

Second round
15	(Spain) P Carreño Busta	6	5	2
(Argentina) F Delbonis	1	7	6
(Germany) J-L Struff	6	6
20	(France) G Simon	1	1
25	(Spain) F Verdasco	7^{11}	7
Q	(United States) E Escobedo	6^{9}	5
(South Africa) K Anderson	4	3
2	(Japan) K Nishikori	6	6

Third round
(Argentina) F Delbonis	7^{7}	6
(Germany) J-L Struff	6^{5}	1
25	(Spain) F Verdasco	6^{2}	7^{7}	1
2	(Japan) K Nishikori	7^{7}	6^{5}	6

Fourth round
(Argentina) F Delbonis	3	6	3
2	(Japan) K Nishikori	6	4	6

== Qualifying ==
=== Seeds ===
1. (Georgia (country)) Nikoloz Basilashvili (moved to main draw)
2. (France) Pierre-Hugues Herbert (first round)
3. (Russia) Mikhail Youzhny (qualifying competition, lucky loser)
4. (Brazil) Rogério Dutra Silva (qualifying competition)
5. (United States) Frances Tiafoe (qualified)
6. (Moldova) Radu Albot (qualified)
7. (Argentina) Renzo Olivo (qualifying competition)
8. (Kazakhstan) Mikhail Kukushkin (qualified)
9. (United States) Jared Donaldson (qualified)
10. (Argentina) Nicolás Kicker (qualifying competition)
11. (Slovakia) Lukáš Lacko (qualified)
12. (Colombia) Santiago Giraldo (first round)
13. (United States) Ernesto Escobedo (qualified)
14. (United Kingdom) Aljaž Bedene (qualified)
15. (Serbia) Dušan Lajović (qualified)
16. (Ukraine) Sergiy Stakhovsky (qualifying competition)
17. (Romania) Marius Copil (first round)
18. (United States) Bjorn Fratangelo (first round, retired)
19. (Slovakia) Norbert Gombos (qualifying competition)
20. (United States) Stefan Kozlov (qualifying competition)
21. (Slovakia) Jozef Kovalík (first round)
22. (Switzerland) Henri Laaksonen (first round)
23. (Canada) Peter Polansky (first round)
24. (Brazil) João Souza (first round)

=== Qualifiers ===
1. (Barbados) Darian King
2. (United Kingdom) Aljaž Bedene
3. (Germany) Benjamin Becker
4. (United States) Christian Harrison
5. (United States) Frances Tiafoe
6. (Moldova) Radu Albot
7. (United States) Ernesto Escobedo
8. (Kazakhstan) Mikhail Kukushkin
9. (United States) Jared Donaldson
10. (Serbia) Dušan Lajović
11. (Slovakia) Lukáš Lacko
12. (United States) Tim Smyczek

=== Lucky losers ===
1. (Russia) Mikhail Youzhny

=== Qualifying draw ===
==== First qualifier ====
First round
Alt	(Croatia) Ivan Dodig	4	7	0
(Barbados) Darian King	6	5	6
(United States) Reilly Opelka	6	7^{7}
17	(Romania) Marius Copil	4	6^{3}

Qualifying competition
(Barbados) Darian King	w/o
(United States) Reilly Opelka

==== Second qualifier ====
First round
2	(France) Pierre-Hugues Herbert	6	3	5
(Germany) Tobias Kamke	3	6	7
(Italy) Federico Gaio	4	3
14	(United Kingdom) Aljaž Bedene	6	6

Qualifying competition
(Germany) Tobias Kamke	2	3
14	(United Kingdom) Aljaž Bedene	6	6

==== Third qualifier ====
First round
3	(Russia) Mikhail Youzhny	6	4	7^{7}
(France) Vincent Millot	4	6	6^{4}
(Germany) Benjamin Becker	6	6^{8}	7
24	(Brazil) João Souza	4	7^{10}	5

Qualifying competition
3	(Russia) Mikhail Youzhny	6	3	2
(Germany) Benjamin Becker	1	6	6

==== Fourth qualifier ====
First round
4	(Brazil) Rogério Dutra Silva	6	3	7^{11}
(Czech Republic) Lukáš Rosol	4	6	6^{9}
WC	(United States) Christian Harrison	6	6
23	(Canada) Peter Polansky	4	2

Qualifying competition
4	(Brazil) Rogério Dutra Silva	5	2
WC	(United States) Christian Harrison	7	6

==== Fifth qualifier ====
First round
5	(United States) Frances Tiafoe	7^{7}	6
(Russia) Teymuraz Gabashvili	6^{2}	3
(France) Mathias Bourgue	6	2
18	(United States) Bjorn Fratangelo	3	1^{r}

Qualifying competition
5	(United States) Frances Tiafoe	4	6	6
(France) Mathias Bourgue	6	4	4

==== Sixth qualifier ====
First round
6	(Moldova) Radu Albot	6	5
(Sweden) Elias Ymer	2	1^{r}
PR	(Latvia) Ernests Gulbis	7^{7}	4	0
16	(Ukraine) Sergiy Stakhovsky	6^{3}	6	6

Qualifying competition
6	(Moldova) Radu Albot	4	6	6
16	(Ukraine) Sergiy Stakhovsky	6	2	4

==== Seventh qualifier ====
First round
7	(Argentina) Renzo Olivo	7	6^{3}	6
(Kazakhstan) Alexander Bublik	5	7^{7}	1
(United States) Denis Kudla	3	2
13	(United States) Ernesto Escobedo	6	6

Qualifying competition
7	(Argentina) Renzo Olivo	5	3
13	(United States) Ernesto Escobedo	7	6

==== Eighth qualifier ====
First round
8	(Kazakhstan) Mikhail Kukushkin	6	0
(Germany) Peter Gojowczyk	4	0^{r}
(France) Quentin Halys	4	6	6^{2}
19	(Slovakia) Norbert Gombos	6	1	7^{7}

Qualifying competition
8	(Kazakhstan) Mikhail Kukushkin	6	6
19	(Slovakia) Norbert Gombos	4	1

==== Ninth qualifier ====
First round
9	(United States) Jared Donaldson	6	6
WC	(China) Wu Yibing	2	2
WC	(Spain) Nicola Kuhn	3	6	3
20	(United States) Stefan Kozlov	6	3	6

Qualifying competition
9	(United States) Jared Donaldson	7	6
20	(United States) Stefan Kozlov	5	3

==== Tenth qualifier ====
First round
10	(Argentina) Nicolás Kicker	7^{7}	7^{7}
(Australia) Andrew Whittington	6^{3}	6^{2}
(Slovenia) Grega Žemlja	3	0^{r}
15	(Serbia) Dušan Lajović	6	0

Qualifying competition
10	(Argentina) Nicolás Kicker	4	3
15	(Serbia) Dušan Lajović	6	6

==== Eleventh qualifier ====
First round
11	(Slovakia) Lukáš Lacko	6	4	6
WC	(United States) Vasil Kirkov	4	6	4
WC	(Serbia) Miomir Kecmanović	6	6
22	(Switzerland) Henri Laaksonen	2	4

Qualifying competition
11	(Slovakia) Lukáš Lacko	6	6
WC	(Serbia) Miomir Kecmanović	3	2

==== Twelfth qualifier ====
First round
12	(Colombia) Santiago Giraldo	4	3
(United States) Tim Smyczek	6	6
(Belgium) Ruben Bemelmans	1	7	6
21	(Slovakia) Jozef Kovalík	6	5	3

Qualifying competition
(United States) Tim Smyczek	7	6
(Belgium) Ruben Bemelmans	5	1
