= 2017 Miami Open – Women's singles =

Women's singles
- 2017 Miami Open

Final
- Champion: (United Kingdom) Johanna Konta
- Runner-up: (Denmark) Caroline Wozniacki
- Score: 6–4, 6–3

Events
Singles	men	women
Doubles	men	women
- Miami Open

Johanna Konta defeated Caroline Wozniacki in the final, 6–4, 6–3 to win the women's singles tennis title at the 2017 Miami Open. She became the first British woman to win a WTA Premier Mandatory title.

Victoria Azarenka was the reigning champion, but did not participate this year as she was on maternity leave.

== Seeds ==
All seeds received a bye into the second round.

1. (Germany) Angelique Kerber (quarterfinals)
2. (Czech Republic) Karolína Plíšková (semifinals)
3. (Romania) Simona Halep (quarterfinals)
4. (Slovakia) Dominika Cibulková (fourth round)
5. (Poland) Agnieszka Radwańska (third round)
6. (Spain) Garbiñe Muguruza (fourth round, retired)
7. (Russia) Svetlana Kuznetsova (fourth round)
8. (United States) Madison Keys (third round)
9. (Ukraine) Elina Svitolina (second round)
10. (United Kingdom) Johanna Konta (champion)
11. (United States) Venus Williams (semifinals)
12. (Denmark) Caroline Wozniacki (final)
13. (Russia) Elena Vesnina (second round)
14. (Australia) Samantha Stosur (fourth round)
15. (Czech Republic) Barbora Strýcová (fourth round)
16. (Netherlands) Kiki Bertens (second round)

17. (Russia) Anastasia Pavlyuchenkova (third round)
18. (United States) CoCo Vandeweghe (second round)
19. (Latvia) Anastasija Sevastova (second round)
20. (Spain) Carla Suárez Navarro (second round)
21. (France) Caroline Garcia (second round)
22. (France) Kristina Mladenovic (second round)
23. (Australia) Daria Gavrilova (second round)
24. (Hungary) Tímea Babos (second round)
25. (Italy) Roberta Vinci (second round)
26. (Croatia) Mirjana Lučić-Baroni (quarterfinals)
27. (Kazakhstan) Yulia Putintseva (third round)
28. (Romania) Irina-Camelia Begu (second round)
29. (Croatia) Ana Konjuh (second round)
30. (China) Zhang Shuai (third round)
31. (Russia) Daria Kasatkina (second round)
32. (Russia) Ekaterina Makarova (second round)

Click on the seed number of a player to go to their draw section.

== Draw ==
Key

- Q = Qualifier
- WC = Wild card
- LL = Lucky loser
- Alt = Alternate
- ITF = ITF entry
- PR = Protected ranking
- SR = Special ranking
- SE = Special exempt
- JE = Junior exempt
- JR = Junior Accelerator Programme entrant
- CO = College Accelerator Programme entrant
- NG = Next Gen Accelerator Program entrant
- w/o = Walkover
- r = Retired
- d = Defaulted

=== Finals ===
Quarterfinals
1	(Germany) Angelique Kerber	5	3
11	(United States) Venus Williams	7	6
3	(Romania) Simona Halep	6	6^{7}	2
10	(United Kingdom) Johanna Konta	3	7^{9}	6
12	(Denmark) Caroline Wozniacki	6	6
(Czech Republic) Lucie Šafářová	4	3
26	(Croatia) Mirjana Lučić-Baroni	3	4
2	(Czech Republic) Karolína Plíšková	6	6

Semifinals
11	(United States) Venus Williams	4	5
10	(United Kingdom) Johanna Konta	6	7
12	(Denmark) Caroline Wozniacki	5	6	6
2	(Czech Republic) Karolína Plíšková	7	1	1

Final
10	(United Kingdom) Johanna Konta	6	6
12	(Denmark) Caroline Wozniacki	4	3

=== Top half ===
==== Section 1 ====
First round
(China) Y Duan	7^{8}	6
(Germany) L Siegemund	6^{6}	3
(United States) S Rogers	4	6	7^{7}
Q	(New Zealand) M Erakovic	6	3	6^{4}
(Germany) J Görges	7	6
(United States) A Riske	5	3
Q	(Japan) R Ozaki	3	7	6
(United States) L Chirico	6	5	1

Second round
1	(Germany) A Kerber	7^{7}	6
(China) Y Duan	6^{3}	2
(United States) S Rogers	6	5	6
31	(Russia) D Kasatkina	4	7	0
20	(Spain) C Suárez Navarro	4	6^{5}
(Germany) J Görges	6	7^{7}
Q	(Japan) R Ozaki	6	4	6
16	(Netherlands) K Bertens	4	6	1

Third round
1	(Germany) A Kerber	6	7
(United States) S Rogers	4	5
(Germany) J Görges	6^{5}	3
Q	(Japan) R Ozaki	7^{7}	6

Fourth round
1	(Germany) A Kerber	6	6
Q	(Japan) R Ozaki	2	2

==== Section 2 ====
First round
WC	(Brazil) B Haddad Maia	3
(Ukraine) L Tsurenko	2^{r}
(United Kingdom) H Watson	6^{4}	1
Q	(Romania) PM Țig	7^{7}	6
WC	(United States) A Anisimova	6	2	3
Q	(United States) T Townsend	2	6	6
(Luxembourg) M Minella	7^{7}	5	7
(Czech Republic) Kr Plíšková	6^{4}	7	5

Second round
11	(United States) V Williams	6	6
WC	(Brazil) B Haddad Maia	4	3
Q	(Romania) PM Țig	7^{7}	6
22	(France) K Mladenovic	6^{4}	2
25	(Italy) R Vinci	3	2
Q	(United States) T Townsend	6	6
(Luxembourg) M Minella	2	2
7	(Russia) S Kuznetsova	6	6

Third round
11	(United States) V Williams	6	6
Q	(Romania) PM Țig	3	0
Q	(United States) T Townsend	4	2
7	(Russia) S Kuznetsova	6	6

Fourth round
11	(United States) V Williams	6	7^{7}
7	(Russia) S Kuznetsova	3	6^{4}

==== Section 3 ====
First round
(Slovakia) K Kučová	2	3
(Japan) N Osaka	6	6
Q	(Japan) K Nara	2	1
Q	(Estonia) A Kontaveit	6	6
(China) S Peng	6	0
(Montenegro) D Kovinić	2	0^{r}
(Canada) E Bouchard	4	7	3
WC	(Australia) A Barty	6	5	6

Second round
3	(Romania) S Halep	6	2	6
(Japan) N Osaka	4	6	3
Q	(Estonia) A Kontaveit	6^{1}	6	6
32	(Russia) E Makarova	7^{7}	2	2
21	(France) C Garcia	4	0
(China) S Peng	6	6
WC	(Australia) A Barty	4	4
14	(Australia) S Stosur	6	6

Third round
3	(Romania) S Halep	6	6
Q	(Estonia) A Kontaveit	3	0
(China) S Peng	6	3	5
14	(Australia) S Stosur	4	6	7

Fourth round
3	(Romania) S Halep	4	7	6
14	(Australia) S Stosur	6	5	2

==== Section 4 ====
First round
(France) A Cornet	4	6	4
Q	(Belarus) A Sasnovich	6	1	6
(France) O Dodin	2	1
(France) P Parmentier	6	6
(Spain) L Arruabarrena	7	6
WC	(Russia) N Vikhlyantseva	5	1
(Switzerland) V Golubic	3	6	6
(Bulgaria) T Pironkova	6	1	1

Second round
10	(United Kingdom) J Konta	6	6^{5}	6
Q	(Belarus) A Sasnovich	2	7^{7}	4
(France) P Parmentier	6^{1}	6	6
24	(Hungary) T Babos	7^{7}	2	0
28	(Romania) I-C Begu	6	4	3
(Spain) L Arruabarrena	3	6	6
(Switzerland) V Golubic	1	2
8	(United States) M Keys	6	6

Third round
10	(United Kingdom) J Konta	6	6
(France) P Parmentier	4	0
(Spain) L Arruabarrena	7	7
8	(United States) M Keys	5	5

Fourth round
10	(United Kingdom) J Konta	7	6
(Spain) L Arruabarrena	5	1

=== Bottom half ===
==== Section 5 ====
First round
(United States) C McHale	6^{2}	7	6
(Germany) A Beck	7^{7}	5	0
(Italy) S Errani	6	4	6
(Switzerland) B Bencic	3	6	3
(Romania) S Cîrstea	6	6
(Puerto Rico) M Puig	2	4
(United States) L Davis	3	3
Q	(United States) V Lepchenko	6	6

Second round
6	(Spain) G Muguruza	0	7^{8}	6
(United States) C McHale	6	6^{6}	4
(Italy) S Errani	6	4	5
30	(China) S Zhang	4	6	7
19	(Latvia) A Sevastova	6^{4}	6	3
(Romania) S Cîrstea	7^{7}	3	6
Q	(United States) V Lepchenko	1	2
12	(Denmark) C Wozniacki	6	6

Third round
6	(Spain) G Muguruza	4	6	6
30	(China) S Zhang	6	2	2
(Romania) S Cîrstea	4	2
12	(Denmark) C Wozniacki	6	6

Fourth round
6	(Spain) G Muguruza	6^{1}	0^{r}
12	(Denmark) C Wozniacki	7^{7}	0

==== Section 6 ====
First round
LL	(Poland) M Linette	2	6	2
WC	(Croatia) A Tomljanović	6	1	6
(Belgium) Y Wickmayer	6^{2}	4
(Czech Republic) L Šafářová	7^{7}	6
(Belgium) K Flipkens	3	6	7
(United States) J Brady	6	3	5
(Japan) M Doi	2	4
Q	(Paraguay) V Cepede Royg	6	6

Second round
13	(Russia) E Vesnina	6	4	5
WC	(Croatia) A Tomljanović	3	6	7
(Czech Republic) L Šafářová	6	6
23	(Australia) D Gavrilova	2	2
29	(Croatia) A Konjuh	6^{4}	7^{8}	2
(Belgium) K Flipkens	7^{7}	6^{6}	6
Q	(Paraguay) V Cepede Royg	3	2
4	(Slovakia) D Cibulková	6	6

Third round
WC	(Croatia) A Tomljanović	1	3
(Czech Republic) L Šafářová	6	6
(Belgium) K Flipkens	2	3
4	(Slovakia) D Cibulková	6	6

Fourth round
(Czech Republic) L Šafářová	7^{7}	6
4	(Slovakia) D Cibulková	6^{5}	1

==== Section 7 ====
First round
Q	(Croatia) D Vekić	6	4	2
(China) Q Wang	0	6	6
(Ukraine) K Bondarenko	6	7
WC	(Spain) P Badosa Gibert	4	5
(Serbia) J Janković	6	4	6^{3}
(Kazakhstan) Y Shvedova	4	6	7^{7}
WC	(United States) B Mattek-Sands	6	4	6
(Czech Republic) K Siniaková	3	6	4

Second round
5	(Poland) A Radwańska	7^{7}	6
(China) Q Wang	6^{3}	1
(Ukraine) K Bondarenko	2	6	6^{2}
26	(Croatia) M Lučić-Baroni	6	2	7^{7}
17	(Russia) A Pavlyuchenkova	6^{3}	6	6
(Kazakhstan) Y Shvedova	7^{7}	2	0
WC	(United States) B Mattek-Sands	7	6
9	(Ukraine) E Svitolina	5	4

Third round
5	(Poland) A Radwańska	0	3
26	(Croatia) M Lučić-Baroni	6	6
17	(Russia) A Pavlyuchenkova	6	0	3
WC	(United States) B Mattek-Sands	4	6	6

Fourth round
26	(Croatia) M Lučić-Baroni	7	6
WC	(United States) B Mattek-Sands	5	4

==== Section 8 ====
First round
(Sweden) J Larsson	6	6
(Romania) M Niculescu	3	1
(Germany) A Petkovic	2	4
Q	(Slovakia) J Čepelová	6	6
(Germany) C Witthöft	6	6
WC	(United States) N Gibbs	3	3
Q	(United States) M Brengle	6	3	6
(Latvia) J Ostapenko	3	6	2

Second round
15	(Czech Republic) B Strýcová	4	6	7^{7}
(Sweden) J Larsson	6	3	6^{3}
Q	(Slovakia) J Čepelová	6	3	6
18	(United States) C Vandeweghe	2	6	1
27	(Kazakhstan) Y Putintseva	6	6
(Germany) C Witthöft	4	4
Q	(United States) M Brengle	1	3
2	(Czech Republic) Ka Plíšková	6	6

Third round
15	(Czech Republic) B Strýcová	6	6
Q	(Slovakia) J Čepelová	2	4
27	(Kazakhstan) Y Putintseva	5	3
2	(Czech Republic) Ka Plíšková	7	6

Fourth round
15	(Czech Republic) B Strýcová	1	4
2	(Czech Republic) Ka Plíšková	6	6

== Qualifying ==
=== Seeds ===
1. (Belgium) Elise Mertens (first round)
2. (Poland) Magda Linette (qualifying competition, lucky loser)
3. (Japan) Nao Hibino (first round)
4. (Russia) Evgeniya Rodina (qualifying competition)
5. (Greece) Maria Sakkari (first round)
6. (Japan) Kurumi Nara (qualified)
7. (Croatia) Donna Vekić (qualified)
8. (United States) Varvara Lepchenko (qualified)
9. (United States) Madison Brengle (qualified)
10. (Japan) Risa Ozaki (qualified)
11. (Russia) Irina Khromacheva (first round)
12. (Germany) Mona Barthel (qualifying competition)
13. (United States) Irina Falconi (qualifying competition)
14. (United States) Julia Boserup (qualifying competition)
15. (Slovakia) Jana Čepelová (qualified)
16. (Romania) Patricia Maria Țig (qualified)
17. (Germany) Tatjana Maria (first round)
18. (Turkey) Çağla Büyükakçay (first round)
19. (Spain) Sara Sorribes Tormo (qualifying competition)
20. (New Zealand) Marina Erakovic (qualified)
21. (United States) Taylor Townsend (qualified)
22. (Colombia) Mariana Duque Mariño (qualifying competition)
23. (Belarus) Aliaksandra Sasnovich (qualified)
24. (Ukraine) Kateryna Kozlova (first round)

=== Qualifiers ===
1. (Estonia) Anett Kontaveit
2. (Belarus) Aliaksandra Sasnovich
3. (New Zealand) Marina Erakovic
4. (Romania) Patricia Maria Țig
5. (Slovakia) Jana Čepelová
6. (Japan) Kurumi Nara
7. (Croatia) Donna Vekić
8. (United States) Varvara Lepchenko
9. (United States) Madison Brengle
10. (Japan) Risa Ozaki
11. (Paraguay) Verónica Cepede Royg
12. (United States) Taylor Townsend

=== Lucky losers ===
1. (Poland) Magda Linette

=== Draw ===
==== First qualifier ====
First round
1	(Belgium) Elise Mertens	6^{5}	6^{4}
(Belgium) Alison Van Uytvanck	7^{7}	7^{7}
(Estonia) Anett Kontaveit	6	6
18	(Turkey) Çağla Büyükakçay	1	2

Qualifying competition
(Belgium) Alison Van Uytvanck	3	2
(Estonia) Anett Kontaveit	6	6

==== Second qualifier ====
First round
2	(Poland) Magda Linette	7	2	6
(United States) Asia Muhammad	5	6	3
(Bulgaria) Elitsa Kostova	2	6	2
23	(Belarus) Aliaksandra Sasnovich	6	0	6

Qualifying competition
2	(Poland) Magda Linette	4	2
23	(Belarus) Aliaksandra Sasnovich	6	6

==== Third qualifier ====
First round
3	(Japan) Nao Hibino	5	3
(Canada) Françoise Abanda	7	6
(United Kingdom) Naomi Broady	5	4
20	(New Zealand) Marina Erakovic	7	6

Qualifying competition
(Canada) Françoise Abanda	0	7^{7}	5
20	(New Zealand) Marina Erakovic	6	6^{3}	7

==== Fourth qualifier ====
First round
4	(Russia) Evgeniya Rodina	6	6
(Czech Republic) Lucie Hradecká	3	2
(Serbia) Aleksandra Krunić	3	3
16	(Romania) Patricia Maria Țig	6	6

Qualifying competition
4	(Russia) Evgeniya Rodina	6	3	2
16	(Romania) Patricia Maria Țig	3	6	6

==== Fifth qualifier ====
First round
5	(Greece) Maria Sakkari	4	6	6^{2}
WC	(Russia) Anastasia Potapova	6	0	7^{7}
(Slovakia) Rebecca Šramková	3	3
15	(Slovakia) Jana Čepelová	6	6

Qualifying competition
WC	(Russia) Anastasia Potapova	3	1
15	(Slovakia) Jana Čepelová	6	6

==== Sixth qualifier ====
First round
6	(Japan) Kurumi Nara	6	6
(United States) Grace Min	2	1
(Italy) Francesca Schiavone	6	6
24	(Ukraine) Kateryna Kozlova	3	0

Qualifying competition
6	(Japan) Kurumi Nara	6	6
(Italy) Francesca Schiavone	3	0

==== Seventh qualifier ====
First round
7	(Croatia) Donna Vekić	4	6	6
WC	(United States) Kayla Day	6	2	4
(Romania) Ana Bogdan	7	2	6
17	(Germany) Tatjana Maria	5	6	4

Qualifying competition
7	(Croatia) Donna Vekić	6	6
(Romania) Ana Bogdan	2	4

==== Eighth qualifier ====
First round
8	(United States) Varvara Lepchenko	7	6
(Spain) Sílvia Soler Espinosa	5	1
WC	(Poland) Urszula Radwańska	2	2
22	(Colombia) Mariana Duque Mariño	6	6

Qualifying competition
8	(United States) Varvara Lepchenko	4	6	6
22	(Colombia) Mariana Duque Mariño	6	1	1

==== Ninth qualifier ====
First round
9	(United States) Madison Brengle	6	6
(United States) Sachia Vickery	1	2
(United States) Samantha Crawford	2	4
19	(Spain) Sara Sorribes Tormo	6	6

Qualifying competition
9	(United States) Madison Brengle	7^{7}	7
19	(Spain) Sara Sorribes Tormo	6^{2}	5

==== Tenth qualifier ====
First round
10	(Japan) Risa Ozaki	6	6
WC	(United Kingdom) Katie Swan	3	3
PR	(Croatia) Jana Fett	2	6	5
14	(United States) Julia Boserup	6	4	7

Qualifying competition
10	(Japan) Risa Ozaki	7	6
14	(United States) Julia Boserup	5	0

==== Eleventh qualifier ====
First round
11	(Russia) Irina Khromacheva	4	2
(Paraguay) Verónica Cepede Royg	6	6
(Bulgaria) Viktoriya Tomova	2	1
13	(United States) Irina Falconi	6	6

Qualifying competition
(Paraguay) Verónica Cepede Royg	6	6
13	(United States) Irina Falconi	3	3

==== Twelfth qualifier ====
First round
12	(Germany) Mona Barthel	6	6
WC	(Romania) Jaqueline Cristian	1	1
WC	(Russia) Sofya Zhuk	6^{3}	6^{5}
21	(United States) Taylor Townsend	7^{7}	7^{7}

Qualifying competition
12	(Germany) Mona Barthel	6^{6}	3
21	(United States) Taylor Townsend	7^{8}	6
