= 2017 WTA Finals – Doubles =

Doubles
- 2017 WTA Finals

Final
- Champions: (Hungary) Tímea Babos (Czech Republic) Andrea Hlaváčková
- Runners-up: (Netherlands) Kiki Bertens (Sweden) Johanna Larsson
- Score: 4–6, 6–4, [10–5]

Details
- Draw: 8
- Seeds: 8

Events
Singles	Doubles
- WTA Finals

Tímea Babos and Andrea Hlaváčková defeated Kiki Bertens and Johanna Larsson in the final, 4–6, 6–4, [10–5] to win the doubles tennis title at the 2017 WTA Finals.

Ekaterina Makarova and Elena Vesnina were the defending champions, but were defeated in the semifinals by Bertens and Larsson.

This was the final professional appearance for combined 25-time major champion Martina Hingis. Playing alongside Chan Yung-jan, she lost in the semifinals to Babos and Hlaváčková.

== Seeds ==
1. (Chinese Taipei) Chan Yung-jan / (Switzerland) Martina Hingis (semifinals)
2. (Russia) Ekaterina Makarova / (Russia) Elena Vesnina (semifinals)
3. (Hungary) Tímea Babos / (Czech Republic) Andrea Hlaváčková (champions)
4. (Australia) Ashleigh Barty / (Australia) Casey Dellacqua (quarterfinals)
5. (Canada) Gabriela Dabrowski / (China) Xu Yifan (quarterfinals)
6. (Germany) Anna-Lena Grönefeld / (Czech Republic) Květa Peschke (quarterfinals)
7. (Slovenia) Andreja Klepač / (Spain) María José Martínez Sánchez (quarterfinals)
8. (Netherlands) Kiki Bertens / (Sweden) Johanna Larsson (final)

== Draw ==
Key

- Q = Qualifier
- WC = Wild card
- LL = Lucky loser
- Alt = Alternate
- ITF = ITF entry
- PR = Protected ranking
- SR = Special ranking
- SE = Special exempt
- JE = Junior exempt
- JR = Junior Accelerator Programme entrant
- CO = College Accelerator Programme entrant
- NG = Next Gen Accelerator Program entrant
- w/o = Walkover
- r = Retired
- d = Defaulted

=== Draw ===
Quarterfinals
1	(Chinese Taipei) Chan Yung-jan (Switzerland) Martina Hingis	6	6
6	(Germany) Anna-Lena Grönefeld (Czech Republic) Květa Peschke	3	2
3	(Hungary) Tímea Babos (Czech Republic) Andrea Hlaváčková	6	6
7	(Slovenia) Andreja Klepač (Spain) María José Martínez Sánchez	3	4
8	(Netherlands) Kiki Bertens (Sweden) Johanna Larsson	7^{9}	6^{1}	[10]
4	(Australia) Ashleigh Barty (Australia) Casey Dellacqua	6^{7}	7^{7}	[6]
5	(Canada) Gabriela Dabrowski (China) Xu Yifan	1	1
2	(Russia) Ekaterina Makarova (Russia) Elena Vesnina	6	6

Semifinals
1	(Chinese Taipei) Chan Yung-jan (Switzerland) Martina Hingis	4	6^{5}
3	(Hungary) Tímea Babos (Czech Republic) Andrea Hlaváčková	6	7^{7}
8	(Netherlands) Kiki Bertens (Sweden) Johanna Larsson	6	6
2	(Russia) Ekaterina Makarova (Russia) Elena Vesnina	4	3

Final
3	(Hungary) Tímea Babos (Czech Republic) Andrea Hlaváčková	4	6	[10]
8	(Netherlands) Kiki Bertens (Sweden) Johanna Larsson	6	4	[5]
