= 2017 Miami Open – Men's doubles =

Men's doubles
- 2017 Miami Open

Final
- Champions: (Poland) Łukasz Kubot; (Brazil) Marcelo Melo
- Runners-up: (United States) Nicholas Monroe; (United States) Jack Sock
- Score: 7–5, 6–3

Events
| Singles | men | women |
| Doubles | men | women |
| ← 2016 · | Miami Open | · 2018 → |

Pierre-Hugues Herbert and Nicolas Mahut were the defending champions, but withdrew before their second round match due to Herbert's leg injury.

Łukasz Kubot and Marcelo Melo won the title, defeating Nicholas Monroe and Jack Sock in the final, 7–5, 6–3.

Henri Kontinen became the no. 1 ranked doubles player after this tournament, following Herbert and Mahut's withdrawal and Bob and Mike Bryan's loss in the semifinals.

== Seeds ==
1. (Finland) Henri Kontinen / (Australia) John Peers (second round)
2. (France) Pierre-Hugues Herbert / (France) Nicolas Mahut (second round, withdrew)
3. (United States) Bob Bryan / (United States) Mike Bryan (semifinals)
4. (United Kingdom) Jamie Murray / (Brazil) Bruno Soares (quarterfinals)
5. (South Africa) Raven Klaasen / (United States) Rajeev Ram (first round)
6. (Poland) Łukasz Kubot / (Brazil) Marcelo Melo (champions)
7. (Croatia) Ivan Dodig / (Spain) Marcel Granollers (quarterfinals)
8. (Spain) Feliciano López / (Spain) Marc López (first round)

== Draw ==
=== Key ===
- Q = Qualifier
- WC = Wild card
- LL = Lucky loser
- Alt = Alternate
- SE = Special exempt
- PR = Protected ranking
- ITF = ITF entry
- JE = Junior exempt
- w/o = Walkover
- r = Retired
- d = Defaulted
- SR = Special ranking

=== Finals ===
Semifinals

Final

(United States) Nicholas Monroe
(United States) Jack Sock
7^{7}
6

3
- (United States) Bob Bryan
- (United States) Mike Bryan
6^{5}
3

- (United States) Nicholas Monroe
- (United States) Jack Sock
5
3

6
(Poland) Łukasz Kubot
(Brazil) Marcelo Melo
7
6

6
(Poland) Łukasz Kubot
(Brazil) Marcelo Melo
6
6

- (United States) Brian Baker
- (Canada) Daniel Nestor
4
3

=== Top half ===
First round

Second round

Quarterfinals

Semifinals

1
(Finland) H Kontinen
(Australia) J Peers
6
4
[10]

- (Colombia) JS Cabal
- (Colombia) R Farah
3
6
[8]

1
- (Finland) H Kontinen
- (Australia) J Peers
6
6^{5}
[8]

- (Pakistan) A-u-H Qureshi
- (France) G Simon
4
3

(United States) N Monroe
(United States) J Sock
3
7^{7}
[10]

(United States) N Monroe
(United States) J Sock
6
6

(United States) N Monroe
(United States) J Sock
7^{7}
6

- (Italy) F Fognini
- (Sweden) R Lindstedt
0
6
[4]

7
- (Croatia) I Dodig
- (Spain) M Granollers
6^{5}
3

(Luxembourg) G Müller
(United States) S Querrey
6
4
[10]

- (Luxembourg) G Müller
- (United States) S Querrey
4
7^{7}
[6]

- (Spain) A Ramos Viñolas
- (Spain) F Verdasco
4
3

7
(Croatia) I Dodig
(Spain) M Granollers
6
6^{5}
[10]

7
(Croatia) I Dodig
(Spain) M Granollers
6
6

(United States) N Monroe
(United States) J Sock
7^{7}
6

3
(United States) B Bryan
(United States) M Bryan
6
6

3
- (United States) B Bryan
- (United States) M Bryan
6^{5}
3

- (France) F Martin
- (Poland) M Matkowski
4
3

3
(United States) B Bryan
(United States) M Bryan
6
6

- (India) R Bopanna
- (Uruguay) P Cuevas
5
6
[7]

WC
- (Australia) N Kyrgios
- (Australia) M Reid
3
4

WC
(Australia) N Kyrgios
(Australia) M Reid
7
3
[10]

3
(United States) B Bryan
(United States) M Bryan
6^{4}
6
[11]

- (Argentina) D Schwartzman
- (Argentina) H Zeballos
6
3
[7]

- (Croatia) M Čilić
- (Croatia) N Mektić
7^{7}
4
[9]

(Croatia) M Čilić
(Croatia) N Mektić
3
6
[10]

(Croatia) M Čilić
(Croatia) N Mektić
7
6

(United States) J Isner
(United States) S Johnson
7
7^{7}

- (United States) J Isner
- (United States) S Johnson
5
3

8
- (Spain) F López
- (Spain) M López
5
6^{2}

=== Bottom half ===
First round

Second round

Quarterfinals

Semifinals

6
(Poland) Ł Kubot
(Brazil) M Melo
2
7^{7}
[10]

Alt
- (New Zealand) M Daniell
- (Brazil) M Demoliner
6
6^{0}
[7]

6
(Poland) Ł Kubot
(Brazil) M Melo
6
3
[11]

(Netherlands) J-J Rojer
(Romania) H Tecău
6
7

- (Netherlands) J-J Rojer
- (Romania) H Tecău
4
6
[9]

- (Serbia) V Troicki
- (New Zealand) M Venus
4
5

6
(Poland) Ł Kubot
(Brazil) M Melo
2
6
[10]

WC
- (Russia) A Rublev
- (Sweden) M Ymer
6^{4}
1

4
- (United Kingdom) J Murray
- (Brazil) B Soares
6
3
[8]

(Italy) P Lorenzi
(Portugal) J Sousa
7^{7}
6

- (Italy) P Lorenzi
- (Portugal) J Sousa
0
3

- (Philippines) T Huey
- (Belarus) M Mirnyi
4
3

4
(United Kingdom) J Murray
(Brazil) B Soares
6
6

4
(United Kingdom) J Murray
(Brazil) B Soares
6
6

6
(Poland) Ł Kubot
(Brazil) M Melo
6
6

5
- (South Africa) R Klaasen
- (United States) R Ram
3
5

- (United States) B Baker
- (Canada) D Nestor
4
3

PR
(Germany) P Petzschner
(Austria) A Peya
6
7

PR
(Germany) P Petzschner
(Austria) A Peya
4
6
[10]

- (Austria) D Thiem
- (Serbia) N Zimonjić
4
3

- (Germany) A Zverev
- (Germany) M Zverev
6
4
[8]

(Germany) A Zverev
(Germany) M Zverev
6
6

PR
- (Germany) P Petzschner
- (Austria) A Peya
3
7
[3]

- (Austria) O Marach
- (Croatia) M Pavić
7^{7}
6^{4}
[9]

(United States) B Baker
(Canada) D Nestor
6
5
[10]

(United States) B Baker
(Canada) D Nestor
6^{3}
7^{7}
[11]

(United States) B Baker
(Canada) D Nestor
w/o

- (United Kingdom) D Inglot
- (Romania) F Mergea
1
6
[14]

2
- (France) P-H Herbert
- (France) N Mahut

2
(France) P-H Herbert
(France) N Mahut
6
4
[16]
