= 2017 Miami Open =

- Date: March 20 – April 2
- Edition: 33rd
- Category: Masters 1000 (ATP); Premier Mandatory (WTA)
- Draw: 96S / 48Q / 32D
- Prize money: $7,913,405 (ATP) $7,669,423 (WTA)
- Surface: Hard - outdoor
- Location: Key Biscayne, Florida, United States
- Venue: Tennis Center at Crandon Park

Champions

Men's singles
- (Switzerland) Roger Federer

Women's singles
- (United Kingdom) Johanna Konta

Men's doubles
- (Poland) Łukasz Kubot / (Brazil) Marcelo Melo

Women's doubles
- (Canada) Gabriela Dabrowski / (China) Xu Yifan
- Miami Open

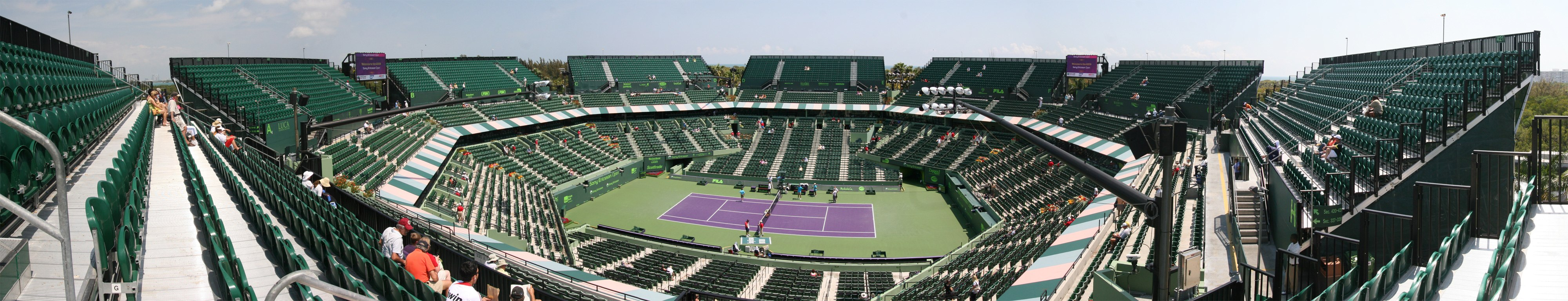
The facility where the 2017 Miami Open took place. Tennis Center at Crandon Park in Key Biscayne, Florida,

The 2017 Miami Open presented by Itaú (also known as 2017 Miami Masters) was a professional men and women's tennis tournament played on outdoor hard courts. It was the 32nd edition of the Miami Open, and part of the Masters 1000 category on the 2017 ATP World Tour, and of the Premier Mandatory category on the 2017 WTA Tour. All men and women's events took place at the Tennis Center at Crandon Park in Key Biscayne, Florida, United States, from March 20 through April 2, 2017.

== Finals ==
=== Men's singles ===
- (Switzerland) Roger Federer defeated (Spain) Rafael Nadal, 6–3, 6–4

=== Women's singles ===
- (United Kingdom) Johanna Konta defeated (Denmark) Caroline Wozniacki, 6–4, 6–3

=== Men's doubles ===
- (Poland) Łukasz Kubot / (Brazil) Marcelo Melo defeated (United States) Nicholas Monroe / (United States) Jack Sock, 7–5, 6–3

=== Women's doubles ===
- (Canada) Gabriela Dabrowski / (China) Xu Yifan defeated (India) Sania Mirza / (Czech Republic) Barbora Strýcová, 6–4, 6–3

== Points and prize money ==
=== Point distribution ===
Event	W	F	SF	QF	Round of 16	Round of 32	Round of 64	Round of 128	Q	Q2	Q1
Men's singles	1000	600	360	180	90	45	25*	10	16	8	0
Men's doubles	1000	600	360	180	90	0	—N/a	—N/a	—N/a	—N/a	—N/a
Women's singles	1000	650	390	215	120	65	35*	10	30	20	2
Women's Doubles	1000	650	390	215	120	10	—N/a	—N/a	—N/a	—N/a	—N/a

- Players with byes receive first round points.

=== Prize money ===
Event	W	F	SF	QF	Round of 16	Round of 32	Round of 64	Round of 128	Q2	Q1
Men's singles	$1,175,505	$573,680	$287,515	$146,575	$77,265	$41,350	$22,325	$13,609	$4,076	$2,026
Women's singles	$1,175,505	$573,680	$287,515	$146,575	$77,265	$41,350	$22,325	$13,609	$4,076	$2,026
Men's doubles	$385,170	$187,970	$94,220	$48,010	$25,320	$13,550	—N/a	—N/a	—N/a	—N/a
Women's doubles	$385,170	$187,970	$94,220	$48,010	$25,320	$13,550	—N/a	—N/a	—N/a	—N/a

== ATP singles main-draw entrants ==
=== Seeds ===
The following are the seeded players. Rankings and seedings are based on ATP rankings as of March 20, 2017.

Seed	Rank	Player	Points before	Points defending	Points won	Points after	Status
1	3	(Switzerland) Stan Wawrinka	5,705	10	90	5,785	Fourth round lost to (Germany) Alexander Zverev [16]
2	4	(Japan) Kei Nishikori	4,730	600	180	4,310	Quarterfinals lost to (Italy) Fabio Fognini
3	5	(Canada) Milos Raonic	4,480	180	45	4,345	Third round withdrew due to hamstring injury
4	6	(Switzerland) Roger Federer	4,305	0	1,000	5,305	Champion, defeated (Spain) Rafael Nadal [5]
5	7	(Spain) Rafael Nadal	4,145	10	600	4,735	Runner-up, lost to (Switzerland) Roger Federer [4]
6	8	(Austria) Dominic Thiem	3,465	90	10	3,385	Second round lost to (Croatia) Borna Ćorić
7	9	(Croatia) Marin Čilić	3,420	45	10	3,385	Second round lost to (France) Jérémy Chardy
8	12	(Belgium) David Goffin	2,975	360	90	2,705	Fourth round lost to (Australia) Nick Kyrgios [12]
9	13	(Bulgaria) Grigor Dimitrov	2,960	90	10	2,880	Second round lost to (Argentina) Guido Pella
10	14	(Czech Republic) Tomáš Berdych	2,790	180	180	2,790	Quarterfinals lost to (Switzerland) Roger Federer [4]
11	15	(France) Lucas Pouille	2,456	90	10	2,376	Second round lost to (United States) Donald Young
12	16	(Australia) Nick Kyrgios	2,425	360	360	2,425	Semifinals lost to (Switzerland) Roger Federer [4]
13	17	(United States) Jack Sock	2,375	45	180	2,510	Quarterfinals lost to (Spain) Rafael Nadal [5]
14	18	(Spain) Roberto Bautista Agut	2,190	90	90	2,190	Fourth round lost to (Switzerland) Roger Federer [4]
15	19	(Spain) Pablo Carreño Busta	2,025	10	10	2,025	Second round lost to (Argentina) Federico Delbonis
16	20	(Germany) Alexander Zverev	1,850	25	180	2,005	Quarterfinals lost to (Australia) Nick Kyrgios [12]
17	21	(Croatia) Ivo Karlović	1,840	(90)	45	1,795	Third round lost to (Australia) Nick Kyrgios [12]
18	23	(United States) John Isner	1,715	10	45	1,750	Third round lost to (Germany) Alexander Zverev [16]
19	24	(Spain) Albert Ramos Viñolas	1,640	25	10	1,625	Second round lost to (Czech Republic) Jiří Veselý
20	25	(France) Gilles Simon	1,495	180	10	1,325	Second round lost to (Germany) Jan-Lennard Struff
21	26	(Uruguay) Pablo Cuevas	1,460	45	10	1,425	Second round lost to (France) Benoît Paire
22	27	(United States) Sam Querrey	1,445	10	45	1,480	Third round lost to (Spain) Roberto Bautista Agut [14]
23	28	(United States) Steve Johnson	1,415	45	10	1,380	Second round lost to (France) Nicolas Mahut
24	29	(Luxembourg) Gilles Müller	1,390	10	45	1,425	Third round lost to (Czech Republic) Tomáš Berdych [10]
25	30	(Spain) Fernando Verdasco	1,325	45	45	1,325	Third round lost to (Japan) Kei Nishikori [2]
26	31	(Germany) Philipp Kohlschreiber	1,270	(45)	45	1,270	Third round lost to (Spain) Rafael Nadal [5]
27	32	(Spain) David Ferrer	1,265	45	10	1,230	Second round lost to (Argentina) Diego Schwartzman
28	33	(Germany) Mischa Zverev	1,251	(12)	10	1,249	Second round lost to (United States) Jared Donaldson [Q]
29	34	(Argentina) Juan Martín del Potro	1,175	25	45	1,195	Third round lost to (Switzerland) Roger Federer [4]
30	35	(Portugal) João Sousa	1,115	45	10	1,080	Second round lost to (Italy) Fabio Fognini
31	36	(Spain) Feliciano López	1,090	10	10	1,090	Second round lost to (Tunisia) Malek Jaziri
32	37	(Italy) Paolo Lorenzi	1,082	(29)	10	1,063	Second round lost to (France) Adrian Mannarino

=== Other entrants ===
The following players received wildcards into the singles main draw:

- (Brazil) Thomaz Bellucci
- (United States) Michael Mmoh
- (Russia) Andrey Rublev
- (Norway) Casper Ruud
- (Sweden) Mikael Ymer

The following players received entry using a protected ranking:

- (Germany) Tommy Haas
- (Spain) Tommy Robredo

The following players received entry from the qualifying draw:

- (Moldova) Radu Albot
- (Germany) Benjamin Becker
- (United Kingdom) Aljaž Bedene
- (United States) Jared Donaldson
- (United States) Ernesto Escobedo
- (United States) Christian Harrison
- (Barbados) Darian King
- (Kazakhstan) Mikhail Kukushkin
- (Slovakia) Lukáš Lacko
- (Serbia) Dušan Lajović
- (United States) Tim Smyczek
- (United States) Frances Tiafoe

The following player received entry as a lucky loser:

- (Russia) Mikhail Youzhny

=== Withdrawals ===
Before the tournament

- (Spain) Nicolás Almagro → replaced by (Georgia (country)) Nikoloz Basilashvili
- (Cyprus) Marcos Baghdatis → replaced by (Germany) Dustin Brown
- (Belgium) Steve Darcis → replaced by (Argentina) Guido Pella
- (Serbia) Novak Djokovic (elbow injury) → replaced by (Brazil) Thiago Monteiro
- (France) Richard Gasquet (appendicitis) → replaced by (Czech Republic) Adam Pavlásek
- (Russia) Daniil Medvedev → replaced by (Bosnia and Herzegovina) Damir Džumhur
- (France) Gaël Monfils (ankle injury) → replaced by (Russia) Konstantin Kravchuk
- (United Kingdom) Andy Murray (elbow injury) → replaced by (United States) Taylor Fritz
- (Australia) Bernard Tomic → replaced by (Russia) Mikhail Youzhny
- (France) Jo-Wilfried Tsonga (birth of child) → replaced by (Japan) Yoshihito Nishioka

During the tournament

- (Canada) Milos Raonic (hamstring injury)

=== Retirements ===
- (Ukraine) Alexandr Dolgopolov
- (Japan) Yoshihito Nishioka

== ATP doubles main-draw entrants ==
=== Seeds ===
Country	Player	Country	Player	Rank^{1}	Seed
FIN	Henri Kontinen	AUS	John Peers	5	1
FRA	Pierre-Hugues Herbert	FRA	Nicolas Mahut	7	2
USA	Bob Bryan	USA	Mike Bryan	8	3
GBR	Jamie Murray	BRA	Bruno Soares	15	4
RSA	Raven Klaasen	USA	Rajeev Ram	21	5
POL	Łukasz Kubot	BRA	Marcelo Melo	26	6
CRO	Ivan Dodig	ESP	Marcel Granollers	28	7
ESP	Feliciano López	ESP	Marc López	28	8

- ^{1} Rankings as of March 20, 2017.

=== Other entrants ===
The following pairs received wildcards into the doubles main draw:

- (Australia) Nick Kyrgios / (Australia) Matt Reid
- (Russia) Andrey Rublev / (Sweden) Mikael Ymer

The following pair received entry as alternates:

- (New Zealand) Marcus Daniell / (Brazil) Marcelo Demoliner

=== Withdrawals ===
Before the tournament

- (France) Lucas Pouille

During the tournament

- (France) Pierre-Hugues Herbert

== WTA singles main-draw entrants ==
=== Seeds ===
The following are the seeded players. Seedings are based on WTA rankings as of March 6, 2017. Rankings and points before are as of March 20, 2017.

Seed	Rank	Player	Points before	Points defending	Points won	Points after	Status
1	1	(Germany) Angelique Kerber	7,515	390	215	7,340	Quarterfinals lost to (United States) Venus Williams [11]
2	3	(Czech Republic) Karolína Plíšková	5,640	10	390	6,020	Semifinals lost to (Denmark) Caroline Wozniacki [12]
3	5	(Romania) Simona Halep	5,022	215	215	5,022	Quarterfinals lost to (United Kingdom) Johanna Konta [10]
4	4	(Slovakia) Dominika Cibulková	5,160	35	120	5,245	Fourth round lost to (Czech Republic) Lucie Šafářová
5	8	(Poland) Agnieszka Radwańska	4,345	120	65	4,290	Third round lost to (Croatia) Mirjana Lučić-Baroni [26]
6	6	(Spain) Garbiñe Muguruza	4,790	120	120	4,790	Fourth round retired vs. (Denmark) Caroline Wozniacki [12]
7	7	(Russia) Svetlana Kuznetsova	4,555	650	120	4,025	Fourth round lost to (United States) Venus Williams [11]
8	9	(United States) Madison Keys	4,007	215	65	3,857	Third round lost to (Spain) Lara Arruabarrena
9	10	(Ukraine) Elina Svitolina	3,850	120	10	3,740	Second round lost to (United States) Bethanie Mattek-Sands [WC]
10	11	(United Kingdom) Johanna Konta	3,545	215	1,000	4,330	Champion, defeated (Denmark) Caroline Wozniacki [12]
11	12	(United States) Venus Williams	3,485	10	390	3,865	Semifinals lost to (United Kingdom) Johanna Konta [10]
12	14	(Denmark) Caroline Wozniacki	3,225	65	650	3,810	Runner-up, lost to (United Kingdom) Johanna Konta [10]
13	13	(Russia) Elena Vesnina	3,320	95	10	3,235	Second round lost to (Croatia) Ajla Tomljanović [WC]
14	19	(Australia) Samantha Stosur	2,010	10	120	2,120	Fourth round lost to (Romania) Simona Halep [3]
15	20	(Czech Republic) Barbora Strýcová	1,995	35	120	2,080	Fourth round lost to (Czech Republic) Karolína Plíšková [2]
16	21	(Netherlands) Kiki Bertens	1,960	95	10	1,875	Second round lost to (Japan) Risa Ozaki [Q]
17	17	(Russia) Anastasia Pavlyuchenkova	2,141	10	65	2,196	Third round lost to (United States) Bethanie Mattek-Sands [WC]
18	22	(United States) CoCo Vandeweghe	1,878	65	10	1,823	Second round lost to (Slovakia) Jana Čepelová [Q]
19	25	(Latvia) Anastasija Sevastova	1,725	(15)	10	1,720	Second round lost to (Romania) Sorana Cîrstea
20	24	(Spain) Carla Suárez Navarro	1,736	10	10	1,736	Second round lost to (Germany) Julia Görges
21	23	(France) Caroline Garcia	1,815	65	10	1,760	Second round lost to (China) Peng Shuai
22	18	(France) Kristina Mladenovic	2,080	10	10	2,080	Second round lost to (Romania) Patricia Maria Țig [Q]
23	26	(Australia) Daria Gavrilova	1,715	10	10	1,715	Second round lost to (Czech Republic) Lucie Šafářová
24	27	(Hungary) Tímea Babos	1,675	120	10	1,565	Second round lost to (France) Pauline Parmentier
25	30	(Italy) Roberta Vinci	1,535	65	10	1,480	Second round lost to (United States) Taylor Townsend [Q]
26	29	(Croatia) Mirjana Lučić-Baroni	1,589	10	215	1,794	Quarterfinals lost to (Czech Republic) Karolína Plíšková [2]
27	32	(Kazakhstan) Yulia Putintseva	1,525	10	65	1,580	Third round lost to (Czech Republic) Karolína Plíšková [2]
28	28	(Romania) Irina-Camelia Begu	1,617	120	10	1,507	Second round lost to (Spain) Lara Arruabarrena
29	31	(Croatia) Ana Konjuh	1,527	(20)	10	1,517	Second round lost to (Belgium) Kirsten Flipkens
30	33	(China) Zhang Shuai	1,480	35	65	1,510	Third round lost to (Spain) Garbiñe Muguruza [6]
31	42	(Russia) Daria Kasatkina	1,285	35	10	1,260	Second round lost to (United States) Shelby Rogers
32	35	(Russia) Ekaterina Makarova	1,426	215	10	1,221	Second round lost to (Estonia) Anett Kontaveit [Q]

=== Other entrants ===
The following players received wildcards into the singles main draw:

- (United States) Amanda Anisimova
- (Spain) Paula Badosa Gibert
- (Australia) Ashleigh Barty
- (United States) Nicole Gibbs
- (Brazil) Beatriz Haddad Maia
- (United States) Bethanie Mattek-Sands
- (Croatia) Ajla Tomljanović
- (Russia) Natalia Vikhlyantseva

The following players received entry from the qualifying draw:

- (United States) Madison Brengle
- (Paraguay) Verónica Cepede Royg
- (Slovakia) Jana Čepelová
- (New Zealand) Marina Erakovic
- (Estonia) Anett Kontaveit
- (United States) Varvara Lepchenko
- (Japan) Kurumi Nara
- (Japan) Risa Ozaki
- (Belarus) Aliaksandra Sasnovich
- (Romania) Patricia Maria Țig
- (United States) Taylor Townsend
- (Croatia) Donna Vekić

The following player received entry as a lucky loser:

- (Poland) Magda Linette

=== Withdrawals ===
Before the tournament

- (Belarus) Victoria Azarenka → replaced by (Luxembourg) Mandy Minella
- (Switzerland) Timea Bacsinszky → replaced by (Ukraine) Kateryna Bondarenko
- (United States) Catherine Bellis → replaced by (Poland) Magda Linette
- (Italy) Camila Giorgi → replaced by (Switzerland) Belinda Bencic
- (Czech Republic) Petra Kvitová → replaced by (Germany) Carina Witthöft
- (United States) Sloane Stephens → replaced by (United States) Jennifer Brady
- (United States) Serena Williams → replaced by (China) Wang Qiang

=== Retirements ===
- (Montenegro) Danka Kovinić
- (Spain) Garbiñe Muguruza
- (Ukraine) Lesia Tsurenko

== WTA doubles main-draw entrants ==
=== Seeds ===
Country	Player	Country	Player	Rank^{1}	Seed
USA	Bethanie Mattek-Sands	CZE	Lucie Šafářová	3	1
RUS	Ekaterina Makarova	RUS	Elena Vesnina	11	2
IND	Sania Mirza	CZE	Barbora Strýcová	19	3
CZE	Andrea Hlaváčková	CHN	Peng Shuai	22	4
TPE	Chan Yung-jan	SUI	Martina Hingis	24	5
USA	Vania King	KAZ	Yaroslava Shvedova	35	6
USA	Raquel Atawo	TPE	Chan Hao-ching	36	7
USA	Abigail Spears	SLO	Katarina Srebotnik	40	8

- ^{1} Rankings as of March 6, 2017.

=== Other entrants ===
The following pairs received wildcards into the doubles main draw:

- (Serbia) Jelena Janković / (United States) Taylor Townsend
- (Japan) Naomi Osaka / (Puerto Rico) Monica Puig
- (Croatia) Ajla Tomljanović / (United Kingdom) Heather Watson

The following pair received entry as alternates:

- (United States) Lauren Davis / (United States) Nicole Melichar

=== Withdrawals ===
Before the tournament

- (Netherlands) Kiki Bertens (right knee injury)

=== Retirements ===
- (China) Zhang Shuai (gastroenteritis)
