= Ashleigh Barty career statistics =

Career statistics of tennis player Ashleigh Barty

Career finals
| Discipline | Type | Won | Lost | Total | WR (Note: Winning rate) |
| Singles | Grand Slam | 3 | 0 | 3 | 1.00 |
| Singles | WTA Finals (Note: Formerly known as: Virginia Slims Championships (until 1995); WTA Tour Championships (until 2014)) | 1 | 0 | 1 | 1.00 |
| Singles | WTA Elite (Note: Elite tier: WTA Tournament of Champions (2009–14); WTA Elite Trophy (2015–present)) | 1 | 0 | 1 | 1.00 |
| Singles | WTA 1000 (Note: Formerly known as: Category 4 & 5 & 6 (until 1990); Tier I (until 2009); WTA Premier Mandatory and 5 (until 2021)) | 3 | 3 | 6 | 0.50 |
| Singles | WTA 500 (Note: Formerly known as: Category 3 (until 1990); Tier II (until 2009); WTA Premier (until 2021)) | 5 | 3 | 8 | 0.63 |
| Singles | WTA 250 (Note: Formerly known as: Category 1 & 2 (until 1990); Tier III & IV & V (until 2009); WTA International (until 2021)) | 2 | 0 | 2 | 1.00 |
| Singles | Olympics | – | – | – | – |
| Singles | Total | 15 | 6 | 21 | 0.71 |
| Doubles | Grand Slam | 1 | 5 | 6 | 0.16 |
| Doubles | WTA Finals | – | – | – | – |
| Doubles | WTA Elite | – | – | – | – |
| Doubles | WTA 1000 | 4 | 0 | 4 | 1.00 |
| Doubles | WTA 500 | 3 | 4 | 7 | 0.43 |
| Doubles | WTA 250 | 4 | 0 | 4 | 1.00 |
| Doubles | Olympics | – | – | – | – |
| Doubles | Total | 12 | 9 | 21 | 0.57 |

This is a list of the main career statistics of professional Australian tennis player Ashleigh Barty. She has won 15 singles and 12 doubles titles on the WTA Tour, including three Grand Slam titles in singles and one in doubles, and finished as the year-end world No. 1 in singles in 2019, 2020 and 2021.

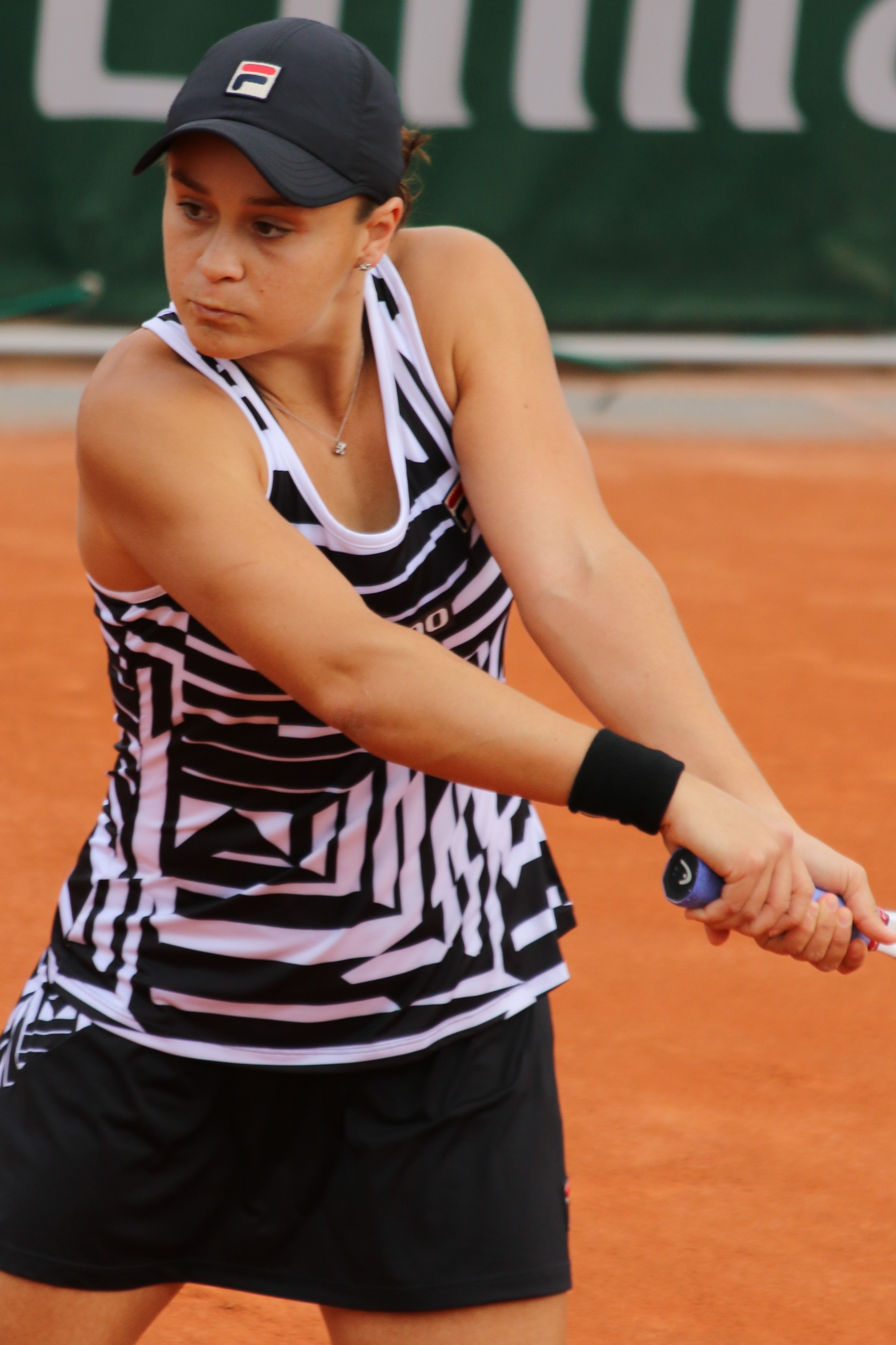
Barty at the 2019 French Open, where she won her maiden Grand Slam singles title

== Performance timelines ==
Key
| W | F | SF | QF | #R | RR | Q# | DNQ | A | NH |

(W) winner; (F) finalist; (SF) semifinalist; (QF) quarterfinalist; (#R) rounds 4, 3, 2, 1; (RR) round-robin stage; (Q#) qualification round; (DNQ) did not qualify; (A) absent; (NH) not held; (SR) strike rate (events won / competed); (W–L) win–loss record.
To avoid confusion and double counting, these charts are updated at the conclusion of a tournament or when the player's participation has ended.

Only main-draw results in WTA Tour, Grand Slam tournaments, Billie Jean King Cup (Fed Cup), Hopman Cup and Olympic Games are included in win–loss records.

=== Singles ===
| Tournament | 2011 | 2012 | 2013 | 2014 | 2015 | 2016 | 2017 | 2018 | 2019 | 2020 | 2021 | 2022 | SR | W–L | Win % |
|---|---|---|---|---|---|---|---|---|---|---|---|---|---|---|---|
Grand Slam tournaments
| Australian Open | A | 1R | 1R | 1R | A | A | 3R | 3R | QF | SF | QF | W | 1 / 9 | 24–8 | 75% |
| French Open | A | 1R | 2R | 1R | A | A | 1R | 2R | W | A | 2R | A | 1 / 7 | 10–6 | 63% |
| Wimbledon | A | 1R | Q1 | Q3 | A | Q2 | 1R | 3R | 4R | NH | W | A | 1 / 5 | 12–4 | 75% |
| US Open | Q1 | A | 2R | 1R | A | A | 3R | 4R | 4R | A | 3R | A | 0 / 6 | 11–6 | 65% |
| Win–loss | 0–0 | 0–3 | 2–3 | 0–3 | 0–0 | 0–0 | 4–4 | 8–4 | 17–3 | 5–1 | 14–3 | 7–0 | 3 / 27 | 57–24 | 70% |
Year-end championships
| WTA Finals | DNQ | | | | | | | | W | NH | A | DNQ | 1 / 1 | 4–1 | 80% |
| WTA Elite Trophy | DNQ | | | | | | SF | W | A | NH | | | 1 / 2 | 5–2 | 71% |
National representation
| Billie Jean King Cup | A | A | 1R | SF | A | A | WG2 | PO | F | A (Note: Edition is split into the two years due to COVID-19.) | | A | 0 / 3 | 11–2 | 85% |
| Summer Olympics | NH | A | NH | | | A | NH | | | | 1R | NH | 0 / 1 | 0–1 | 0% |
WTA 1000
| Dubai / Qatar Open (Note: The first Premier 5 event of the year has switched back and forth between the Dubai Tennis Championships and the Qatar Total Open since 2009. Dubai was classified as a Premier 5 event from 2009 to 2011 before being succeeded by Doha for the 2012–2014 period. In 2015, Dubai regained its Premier 5 status while Doha was demoted to Premier status. The Premier 5 tournaments were reclassified as WTA 1000 tournaments in 2021.) | A | A | A | A | A | A | A | A | A | SF | A | A | 0 / 1 | 3–1 | 75% |
| Indian Wells Open | A | A | A | A | A | A | A | 2R | 4R | NH | A | A | 0 / 2 | 2–2 | 50% |
| Miami Open | A | A | A | A | A | A | 2R | 4R | W | NH | W | A | 2 / 4 | 15–2 | 88% |
| Madrid Open | A | A | A | A | A | A | A | 2R | QF | NH | F | A | 0 / 3 | 9–3 | 75% |
| Italian Open | A | A | A | A | A | A | Q2 | 1R | 3R | A | QF | A | 0 / 3 | 3–3 | 50% |
| Canadian Open | A | A | A | A | A | A | 3R | SF | 2R | NH | A | A | 0 / 3 | 6–3 | 67% |
| Cincinnati Open | A | A | A | A | A | A | 3R | 3R | SF | A | W | A | 1 / 4 | 12–3 | 80% |
| Pan Pacific / Wuhan Open (Note: In 2014, the Toray Pan Pacific Open was downgraded to a Premier event and replaced by the Wuhan Open. The Premier 5 tournaments were reclassified as WTA 1000 tournaments in 2021.) | A | A | Q2 | A | A | A | F | SF | SF | NH | | | 0 / 3 | 12–3 | 80% |
| China Open | A | A | A | A | A | A | 2R | A | F | NH | | | 0 / 2 | 4–2 | 67% |
Career statistics
| | 2011 | 2012 | 2013 | 2014 | 2015 | 2016 | 2017 | 2018 | 2019 | 2020 | 2021 | 2022 | Career | | |
| Tournaments | 0 | 4 | 5 | 6 | 0 | 1 | 15 | 20 | 15 | 4 | 13 | 2 | Career total: 85 | | |
| Titles | 0 | 0 | 0 | 0 | 0 | 0 | 1 | 2 | 4 | 1 | 5 | 2 | Career total: 15 | | |
| Finals | 0 | 0 | 0 | 0 | 0 | 0 | 3 | 3 | 6 | 1 | 6 | 2 | Career total: 21 | | |
| Hard win–loss | 0–0 | 0–2 | 3–4 | 1–3 | 0–0 | 0–0 | 22–10 | 27–11 | 38–10 | 11–3 | 21–4 | 11–0 | 10 / 54 | 134–47 | 74% |
| Clay win–loss | 0–0 | 0–1 | 2–1 | 0–2 | 0–0 | 0–0 | 2–2 | 7–5 | 11–2 | 0–0 | 14–4 | 0–0 | 2 / 19 | 36–17 | 68% |
| Grass win–loss | 0–0 | 0–1 | 0–0 | 0–0 | 0–0 | 2–1 | 6–3 | 12–3 | 8–1 | 0–0 | 7–0 | 0–0 | 3 / 12 | 35–9 | 80% |
| Overall win–loss | 0–0 | 0–4 | 5–5 | 1–5 | 0–0 | 2–1 | 30–15 | 46–19 | 57–13 | 11–3 | 42–8 | 11–0 | 15 / 85 | 205–73 | 74% |
| Win (%) | – | 0% | 50% | 17% | – | 67% | 67% | 71% | 81% | 79% | 84% | 100% | Career total: 74% | | |
| Year-end ranking | 669 | 195 | 164 | 218 | – | 325 | 17 | 15 | 1 | 1 | 1 | – (Note: Barty announced her retirement in March 2022, and therefore was removed from the ranking.) | $23,829,071 | | |

=== Doubles ===
Current after the 2022 Qatar Open.

| Tournament | 2012 | 2013 | 2014 | 2015 | 2016 | 2017 | 2018 | 2019 | 2020 | 2021 | 2022 | SR | W–L | Win% |
|---|---|---|---|---|---|---|---|---|---|---|---|---|---|---|
Grand Slam tournaments
| Australian Open | 1R | F | 2R | A | A | QF | 2R | 2R | 2R | 2R | A | 0 / 8 | 13–6 | 68% |
| French Open | A | 1R | QF | A | A | F | 1R | 3R | A | A | A | 0 / 5 | 10–5 | 67% |
| Wimbledon | A | F | QF | A | 1R | QF | A | 3R | NH | A | A | 0 / 5 | 13–4 | 76% |
| US Open | A | F | 1R | A | A | 2R | W | F | A | A | A | 1 / 5 | 17–4 | 81% |
| Win–loss | 0–1 | 15–4 | 8–4 | 0–0 | 0–1 | 12–4 | 7–2 | 10–2 | 1–1 | 1–0 | 0–0 | 1 / 23 | 53–19 | 74% |
Year-end championships
| WTA Finals | DNQ | | | | | QF | SF | DNQ | NH | DNQ | DNQ | 0 / 2 | 1–2 | 33% |
National representation
| Summer Olympics | A | NH | | | A | NH | | | | QF | NH | 0 / 1 | 2–1 | 67% |
WTA 1000
| Dubai / Qatar Open | A | A | A | A | A | A | A | A | 1R | A | A | 0 / 1 | 0–1 | 0% |
| Indian Wells Open | A | A | QF | A | A | 1R | 1R | 1R | NH | A | A | 0 / 4 | 2–4 | 33% |
| Miami Open | A | A | 1R | A | A | 2R | W | SF | NH | A | A | 1 / 4 | 9–3 | 75% |
| Madrid Open | A | A | A | A | A | A | QF | 2R | NH | A | A | 0 / 2 | 3–2 | 60% |
| Italian Open | A | A | A | A | A | A | W | W | A | A | A | 2 / 2 | 10–0 | 100% |
| Canadian Open | A | A | A | A | A | 1R | W | SF | NH | A | A | 1 / 3 | 8–2 | 80% |
| Cincinnati Open | A | A | A | A | A | QF | A | A | A | A | A | 0 / 1 | 2–1 | 67% |
| Pan Pacific / Wuhan Open | A | 1R | A | A | A | SF | 2R | A | NH | | | 0 / 3 | 2–2 | 50% |
| China Open | A | 2R | A | A | A | 2R | A | A | NH | | | 0 / 2 | 1–2 | 33% |
Career statistics
| | 2012 | 2013 | 2014 | 2015 | 2016 | 2017 | 2018 | 2019 | 2020 | 2021 | 2022 | Career | | |
| Tournaments | 2 | 9 | 9 | 0 | 1 | 17 | 12 | 10 | 3 | 4 | 1 | Career total: 68 | | |
| Titles | 0 | 1 | 1 | 0 | 0 | 3 | 4 | 1 | 0 | 1 | 1 | Career total: 12 | | |
| Finals | 0 | 4 | 2 | 0 | 0 | 6 | 4 | 2 | 1 | 1 | 1 | Career total: 21 | | |
| Overall win–loss | 2–2 | 23–9 | 19–7 | 0–0 | 0–1 | 35–14 | 28–8 | 25–7 | 3–3 | 9–2 | 3–0 | 12 / 68 | 147–53 | 74% |
| Win % | 50% | 72% | 73% | – | 0% | 71% | 78% | 78% | 50% | 82% | 100% | Career total: 74% | | |
| Year-end ranking | 172 | 12 | 39 | – | 261 | 11 | 7 | 19 | 14 | 102 | – | | | |

=== Mixed doubles ===
| Tournament | 2012 | 2013 | 2014 | 2015 | 2016 | 2017 | 2018 | 2019 | 2020 | 2021 | 2022 | SR | W–L | Win% |
|---|---|---|---|---|---|---|---|---|---|---|---|---|---|---|
Grand Slam tournaments
| Australian Open | 1R | 1R | 2R | A | A | A | A | A | A | A | A | 0 / 3 | 1–3 | 25% |
| French Open | A | 1R | A | A | A | A | A | A | NH | A | A | 0 / 1 | 0–1 | 0% |
| Wimbledon | A | QF | 3R | A | A | A | 1R | A | NH | A | A | 0 / 3 | 3–3 | 50% |
| US Open | A | 2R | QF | A | A | A | A | A | NH | A | A | 0 / 2 | 3–2 | 60% |
| Win–loss | 0–1 | 4–4 | 3–3 | 0–0 | 0–0 | 0–0 | 0–1 | 0–0 | 0–0 | 0–0 | 0–0 | 0 / 9 | 7–9 | 44% |
National representation
| Summer Olympics | A | NH | | | A | NH | | | | SF-B | NH | 0 / 1 | 2–1 | 67% |

== Significant finals ==
=== Grand Slam tournaments ===
Barty has won three Grand Slam titles in singles and one in doubles.

==== Singles: 3 (3 titles) ====
| Result | Year | Championship | Surface | Opponent | Score |
|---|---|---|---|---|---|
| Win | 2019 | French Open | Clay | (Czech Republic) Markéta Vondroušová | 6–1, 6–3 |
| Win | 2021 | Wimbledon | Grass | (Czech Republic) Karolína Plíšková | 6–3, 6–7^{(4–7)}, 6–3 |
| Win | 2022 | Australian Open | Hard | (United States) Danielle Collins | 6–3, 7–6^{(7–2)} |

==== Doubles: 6 (1 title, 5 runner-ups) ====
| Result | Year | Championship | Surface | Partner | Opponents | Score |
|---|---|---|---|---|---|---|
| Loss | 2013 | Australian Open | Hard | (Australia) Casey Dellacqua | (Italy) Sara Errani (Italy) Roberta Vinci | 2–6, 6–3, 2–6 |
| Loss | 2013 | Wimbledon | Grass | (Australia) Casey Dellacqua | (Chinese Taipei) Hsieh Su-wei (China) Peng Shuai | 6–7^{(1–7)}, 1–6 |
| Loss | 2013 | US Open | Hard | (Australia) Casey Dellacqua | (Czech Republic) Andrea Hlaváčková (Czech Republic) Lucie Hradecká | 7–6^{(7–4)}, 1–6, 4–6 |
| Loss | 2017 | French Open | Clay | (Australia) Casey Dellacqua | (United States) Bethanie Mattek-Sands (Czech Republic) Lucie Šafářová | 2–6, 1–6 |
| Win | 2018 | US Open | Hard | (United States) CoCo Vandeweghe | (Hungary) Tímea Babos (France) Kristina Mladenovic | 3–6, 7–6^{(7–2)}, 7–6^{(8–6)} |
| Loss | 2019 | US Open | Hard | (Belarus) Victoria Azarenka | (Belgium) Elise Mertens (Belarus) Aryna Sabalenka | 5–7, 5–7 |

=== Olympics ===
==== Mixed doubles: 1 (1 bronze medal) ====
| Result | Year | Tournament | Surface | Partner | Opponents | Score |
|---|---|---|---|---|---|---|
| Bronze | 2021 | Summer Olympics, Tokyo | Hard | (Australia) John Peers | (Serbia) Nina Stojanović (Serbia) Novak Djokovic | Walkover |

=== WTA Finals ===
==== Singles: 1 (1 title) ====
| Result | Year | Championship | Surface | Opponent | Score |
|---|---|---|---|---|---|
| Win | 2019 | WTA Finals, Shenzhen | Hard (i) | (Ukraine) Elina Svitolina | 6–4, 6–3 |

=== WTA Elite Trophy ===
==== Singles: 1 (1 title) ====
| Result | Year | Tournament | Surface | Opponent | Score |
|---|---|---|---|---|---|
| Win | 2018 | WTA Elite Trophy, Zhuhai | Hard (i) | (China) Wang Qiang | 6–3, 6–4 |

=== WTA 1000 ===
==== Singles: 6 (3 titles, 3 runner-ups) ====
| Result | Year | Tournament | Surface | Opponent | Score |
|---|---|---|---|---|---|
| Loss | 2017 | Wuhan Open | Hard | (France) Caroline Garcia | 7–6^{(7–3)}, 6–7^{(4–7)}, 2–6 |
| Win | 2019 | Miami Open | Hard | (Czech Republic) Karolína Plíšková | 7–6^{(7–1)}, 6–3 |
| Loss | 2019 | China Open | Hard | (Japan) Naomi Osaka | 6–3, 3–6, 2–6 |
| Win | 2021 | Miami Open (2) | Hard | (Canada) Bianca Andreescu | 6–3, 4–0 ret. |
| Loss | 2021 | Madrid Open | Clay | (Belarus) Aryna Sabalenka | 0–6, 6–3, 4–6 |
| Win | 2021 | Cincinnati Open | Hard | (Switzerland) Jil Teichmann | 6–3, 6–1 |

==== Doubles: 4 (4 titles) ====
| Result | Year | Tournament | Surface | Partner | Opponents | Score |
|---|---|---|---|---|---|---|
| Win | 2018 | Miami Open | Hard | (United States) CoCo Vandeweghe | (Czech Republic) Barbora Krejčíková (Czech Republic) Kateřina Siniaková | 6–2, 6–1 |
| Win | 2018 | Italian Open | Clay | (Netherlands) Demi Schuurs | (Czech Republic) Andrea Sestini Hlaváčková; (Czech Republic) Barbora Strýcová | 6–3, 6–4 |
| Win | 2018 | Canadian Open | Hard | (Netherlands) Demi Schuurs | (Chinese Taipei) Latisha Chan (Russia) Ekaterina Makarova | 4–6, 6–3, [10–8] |
| Win | 2019 | Italian Open (2) | Clay | (Belarus) Victoria Azarenka | (Germany) Anna-Lena Grönefeld (Netherlands) Demi Schuurs | 4–6, 6–0, [10–3] |

== WTA Tour finals ==
Barty has won fifteen singles and twelve doubles titles in the WTA Tour, including at least one on each major surface (hard, clay and grass) in both disciplines.

=== Singles: 21 (15 titles, 6 runner-ups) ===
| Legend Grand Slam tournaments (3–0) Finals (1–0) Elite (1–0) WTA 1000 (Premier 5 / Premier M) (3–3) WTA 500 (Premier) (5–3) WTA 250 (International) (2–0) | Finals by surface Hard (10–4) Grass (3–1) Clay (2–1) | Finals by setting Outdoor (12–6) Indoor (3–0) |

| Result | W–L | Date | Tournament | Tier | Surface | Opponent | Score |
|---|---|---|---|---|---|---|---|
| Win | 1–0 | Mar 2017 | Malaysian Open, Malaysia | International | Hard | (Japan) Nao Hibino | 6–3, 6–2 |
| Loss | 1–1 | Jun 2017 | Birmingham Classic, UK | Premier | Grass | (Czech Republic) Petra Kvitová | 6–4, 3–6, 2–6 |
| Loss | 1–2 | Sep 2017 | Wuhan Open, China | Premier 5 | Hard | (France) Caroline Garcia | 7–6^{(7–3)}, 6–7^{(4–7)}, 2–6 |
| Loss | 1–3 | Jan 2018 | Sydney International, Australia | Premier | Hard | (Germany) Angelique Kerber | 4–6, 4–6 |
| Win | 2–3 | Jun 2018 | Nottingham Open, UK | International | Grass | (United Kingdom) Johanna Konta | 6–3, 3–6, 6–4 |
| Win | 3–3 | Nov 2018 | WTA Elite Trophy, China | Elite Trophy | Hard (i) | (China) Wang Qiang | 6–3, 6–4 |
| Loss | 3–4 | Jan 2019 | Sydney International, Australia | Premier | Hard | (Czech Republic) Petra Kvitová | 6–1, 5–7, 6–7^{(3–7)} |
| Win | 4–4 | Mar 2019 | Miami Open, U.S. | Premier M | Hard | (Czech Republic) Karolína Plíšková | 7–6^{(7–1)}, 6–3 |
| Win | 5–4 | Jun 2019 | French Open, France | Grand Slam | Clay | (Czech Republic) Markéta Vondroušová | 6–1, 6–3 |
| Win | 6–4 | Jun 2019 | Birmingham Classic, UK | Premier | Grass | (Germany) Julia Görges | 6–3, 7–5 |
| Loss | 6–5 | Oct 2019 | China Open, China | Premier M | Hard | (Japan) Naomi Osaka | 6–3, 3–6, 2–6 |
| Win | 7–5 | Nov 2019 | WTA Finals, China | WTA Finals | Hard (i) | (Ukraine) Elina Svitolina | 6–4, 6–3 |
| Win | 8–5 | Jan 2020 | Adelaide International, Australia | Premier | Hard | (Ukraine) Dayana Yastremska | 6–2, 7–5 |
| Win | 9–5 | Feb 2021 | Yarra Valley Classic, Australia | WTA 500 | Hard | (Spain) Garbiñe Muguruza | 7–6^{(7–3)}, 6–4 |
| Win | 10–5 | Apr 2021 | Miami Open, U.S. (2) | WTA 1000 | Hard | (Canada) Bianca Andreescu | 6–3, 4–0 ret. |
| Win | 11–5 | Apr 2021 | Stuttgart Open, Germany | WTA 500 | Clay (i) | (Belarus) Aryna Sabalenka | 3–6, 6–0, 6–3 |
| Loss | 11–6 | May 2021 | Madrid Open, Spain | WTA 1000 | Clay | (Belarus) Aryna Sabalenka | 0–6, 6–3, 4–6 |
| Win | 12–6 | Jul 2021 | Wimbledon, UK | Grand Slam | Grass | (Czech Republic) Karolína Plíšková | 6–3, 6–7^{(4–7)}, 6–3 |
| Win | 13–6 | Aug 2021 | Cincinnati Open, U.S. | WTA 1000 | Hard | (Switzerland) Jil Teichmann | 6–3, 6–1 |
| Win | 14–6 | Jan 2022 | Adelaide International, Australia (2) | WTA 500 | Hard | (Kazakhstan) Elena Rybakina | 6–3, 6–2 |
| Win | 15–6 | Jan 2022 | Australian Open, Australia | Grand Slam | Hard | (United States) Danielle Collins | 6–3, 7–6^{(7–2)} |

=== Doubles: 21 (12 titles, 9 runner-ups) ===
| Legend Grand Slam tournaments (1–5) WTA 1000 (Premier 5 / Premier M) (4–0) WTA 500 (Premier) (3–4) WTA 250 (International) (4–0) | Finals by surface Hard (5–5) Grass (2–3) Clay (5–1) | Finals by setting Outdoor (11–9) Indoor (1–0) |

| Result | W–L | Date | Tournament | Tier | Surface | Partner | Opponents | Score |
|---|---|---|---|---|---|---|---|---|
| Loss | 0–1 | Jan 2013 | Australian Open, Australia | Grand Slam | Hard | (Australia) Casey Dellacqua | (Italy) Sara Errani (Italy) Roberta Vinci | 2–6, 6–3, 2–6 |
| Win | 1–1 | Jun 2013 | Birmingham Classic, UK | International | Grass | (Australia) Casey Dellacqua | (Zimbabwe) Cara Black (New Zealand) Marina Erakovic | 7–5, 6–4 |
| Loss | 1–2 | Jul 2013 | Wimbledon, UK | Grand Slam | Grass | (Australia) Casey Dellacqua | (Chinese Taipei) Hsieh Su-wei (China) Peng Shuai | 6–7^{(1–7)}, 1–6 |
| Loss | 1–3 | Sep 2013 | US Open, United States | Grand Slam | Hard | (Australia) Casey Dellacqua | (Czech Republic) Andrea Hlaváčková (Czech Republic) Lucie Hradecká | 7–6^{(7–4)}, 1–6, 4–6 |
| Win | 2–3 | May 2014 | Strasbourg International, France | International | Clay | (Australia) Casey Dellacqua | (Argentina) Tatiana Búa (Chile) Daniela Seguel | 4–6, 7–5, [10–4] |
| Loss | 2–4 | Jun 2014 | Birmingham Classic, UK | Premier | Grass | (Australia) Casey Dellacqua | (United States) Raquel Kops-Jones (United States) Abigail Spears | 6–7^{(7–1)}, 1–6 |
| Win | 3–4 | Mar 2017 | Malaysian Open, Malaysia | International | Hard | (Australia) Casey Dellacqua | (United States) Nicole Melichar (Japan) Makoto Ninomiya | 7–6 ^{(7–5)}, 6–3 |
| Win | 4–4 | May 2017 | Strasbourg International, France (2) | International | Clay | (Australia) Casey Dellacqua | (Chinese Taipei) Chan Hao-ching (Chinese Taipei) Chan Yung-jan | 6–4, 6–2 |
| Loss | 4–5 | Jun 2017 | French Open, France | Grand Slam | Clay | (Australia) Casey Dellacqua | (United States) Bethanie Mattek-Sands (Czech Republic) Lucie Šafářová | 2–6, 1–6 |
| Win | 5–5 | Jun 2017 | Birmingham Classic, UK (2) | Premier | Grass | (Australia) Casey Dellacqua | (Chinese Taipei) Chan Hao-ching (China) Zhang Shuai | 6–1, 2–6, [10–8] |
| Loss | 5–6 | Jul 2017 | Eastbourne International, UK | Premier | Grass | (Australia) Casey Dellacqua | (Chinese Taipei) Chan Yung-jan (Switzerland) Martina Hingis | 3–6, 5–7 |
| Loss | 5–7 | Aug 2017 | Connecticut Open, U.S. | Premier | Hard | (Australia) Casey Dellacqua | (Canada) Gabriela Dabrowski (China) Xu Yifan | 6–3, 3–6, [8–10] |
| Win | 6–7 | Apr 2018 | Miami Open, U.S. | Premier M | Hard | (United States) CoCo Vandeweghe | (Czech Republic) Barbora Krejčíková (Czech Republic) Kateřina Siniaková | 6–2, 6–1 |
| Win | 7–7 | May 2018 | Italian Open, Italy | Premier 5 | Clay | (Netherlands) Demi Schuurs | (Czech Republic) Andrea Sestini Hlaváčková (Czech Republic) Barbora Strýcová | 6–3, 6–4 |
| Win | 8–7 | Aug 2018 | Canadian Open, Canada | Premier 5 | Hard | (Netherlands) Demi Schuurs | (Chinese Taipei) Latisha Chan (Russia) Ekaterina Makarova | 4–6, 6–3, [10–8] |
| Win | 9–7 | Sep 2018 | US Open, United States | Grand Slam | Hard | (United States) CoCo Vandeweghe | (Hungary) Tímea Babos (France) Kristina Mladenovic | 3–6, 7–6^{(7–2)}, 7–6^{(8–6)} |
| Win | 10–7 | May 2019 | Italian Open, Italy (2) | Premier 5 | Clay | (Belarus) Victoria Azarenka | (Germany) Anna-Lena Grönefeld (Netherlands) Demi Schuurs | 4–6, 6–0, [10–3] |
| Loss | 10–8 | Sep 2019 | US Open, United States | Grand Slam | Hard | (Belarus) Victoria Azarenka | (Belarus) Aryna Sabalenka (Belgium) Elise Mertens | 5–7, 5–7 |
| Loss | 10–9 | Jan 2020 | Brisbane International, Australia | Premier | Hard | (Netherlands) Kiki Bertens | (Chinese Taipei) Hsieh Su-wei (Czech Republic) Barbora Strýcová | 6–3, 6–7^{(7–9)}, [8–10] |
| Win | 11–9 | Apr 2021 | Stuttgart Open, Germany | WTA 500 | Clay (i) | (United States) Jennifer Brady | (United States) Desirae Krawczyk (United States) Bethanie Mattek-Sands | 6–4, 5–7, [10–5] |
| Win | 12–9 | Jan 2022 | Adelaide International, Australia | WTA 500 | Hard | (Australia) Storm Sanders | (Croatia) Darija Jurak Schreiber (Slovenia) Andreja Klepač | 6–1, 6–4 |

== ITF Circuit finals ==
Barty has won four singles and nine doubles titles on the ITF Women's World Tennis Tour.

=== Singles: 6 (4 titles, 2 runner–ups) ===
Legend
$50,000 tournaments (1–0)
$25,000 tournaments (3–2)

| Result | W–L | Date | Tournament | Tier | Surface | Opponent | Score |
|---|---|---|---|---|---|---|---|
| Win | 1–0 | Feb 2012 | ITF Sydney, Australia | 25,000 | Hard | (Australia) Olivia Rogowska | 6–1, 6–3 |
| Win | 2–0 | Feb 2012 | ITF Mildura, Australia | 25,000 | Grass | (Australia) Viktorija Rajicic | 6–1, 7–6^{(10–8)} |
| Loss | 2–1 | Mar 2012 | ITF Ipswich, Australia | 25,000 | Clay | (Poland) Sandra Zaniewska | 6–7^{(5–7)}, 1–6 |
| Win | 3–1 | Jun 2012 | ITF Nottingham, UK | 50,000 | Grass | (Germany) Tatjana Malek | 6–1, 6–1 |
| Loss | 3–2 | Oct 2012 | ITF Esperance, Australia | 25,000 | Hard | (Australia) Olivia Rogowska | 0–6, 3–6 |
| Win | 4–2 | Oct 2012 | ITF Traralgon, Australia | 25,000 | Hard | (Australia) Arina Rodionova | 6–2, 6–3 |

=== Doubles: 11 (9 titles, 2 runner–ups) ===
Legend
$75,000 tournaments (1–0)
$50,000 tournaments (1–0)
$25,000 tournaments (7–2)

| Result | W–L | Date | Tournament | Tier | Surface | Partner | Opponents | Score |
|---|---|---|---|---|---|---|---|---|
| Win | 1–0 | Jun 2012 | ITF Nottingham, UK | 50,000 | Grass | (Australia) Sally Peers | (Hungary) Réka Luca Jani (Portugal) Maria João Koehler | 7–6^{(7–2)}, 3–6, [10–5] |
| Win | 2–0 | Oct 2012 | ITF Esperance, Australia | 25,000 | Hard | (Australia) Sally Peers | (France) Victoria Larrière (Australia) Olivia Rogowska | 4–6, 7–6^{(7–5)}, [10–4] |
| Loss | 2–1 | Oct 2012 | ITF Traralgon, Australia | 25,000 | Hard | (Australia) Sally Peers | (Russia) Arina Rodionova (Zimbabwe) Cara Black | 6–2, 6–7^{(4–7)}, [8–10] |
| Win | 3–1 | Nov 2012 | ITF Bendigo, Australia | 25,000 | Hard | (Australia) Sally Peers | (Russia) Arina Rodionova (Zimbabwe) Cara Black | 7–6^{(14–12)}, 7–6^{(7–5)} |
| Win | 4–1 | Nov 2012 | ITF Toyota, Japan | 75,000 | Carpet | (Australia) Casey Dellacqua | (Japan) Miki Miyamura (Thailand) Varatchaya Wongteanchai | 6–1, 6–2 |
| Win | 5–1 | Mar 2013 | ITF Innisbrook, United States | 25,000 | Clay | (France) Alizé Lim | (Brazil) Paula Cristina Gonçalves (Argentina) María Irigoyen | 6–1, 6–3 |
| Win | 6–1 | Apr 2013 | ITF Pelham, United States | 25,000 | Clay | (Russia) Arina Rodionova | (Chinese Taipei) Kao Shao-yuan (Chinese Taipei) Lee Hua-chen | 6–4, 6–2 |
| Win | 7–1 | Feb 2016 | ITF Perth, Australia | 25,000 | Hard | (Australia) Jessica Moore | (Australia) Alison Bai (Australia) Abbie Myers | 3–6, 6–4, [10–8] |
| Loss | 7–2 | Feb 2016 | ITF Port Pirie, Australia | 25,000 | Hard | (Australia) Casey Dellacqua | (Chinese Taipei) Lee Ya-hsuan (Japan) Riko Sawayanagi | 4–6, 5–7 |
| Win | 8–2 | Mar 2016 | ITF Canberra, Australia | 25,000 | Clay | (Australia) Arina Rodionova | (Japan) Kanae Hisami (Thailand) Varatchaya Wongteanchai | 6–4, 6–2 |
| Win | 9–2 | Mar 2016 | ITF Canberra, Australia | 25,000 | Clay | (Australia) Arina Rodionova | (Japan) Eri Hozumi (Japan) Miyu Kato | 5–7, 6–3, [10–7] |

== Junior Grand Slam finals ==
=== Singles: 1 (1 title) ===
| Result | Year | Tournament | Surface | Opponent | Score |
|---|---|---|---|---|---|
| Win | 2011 | Wimbledon | Grass | (Russia) Irina Khromacheva | 7–5, 7–6^{(7–3)} |

== Billie Jean King Cup/Fed Cup participation ==
Barty first represented Australia at the Fed Cup in 2013, and helped her country reach the final in 2019.

=== Singles: 13 (11–2) ===
| Edition | Round | Date | Location | Against | Surface | Opponent | W/L | Score |
|---|---|---|---|---|---|---|---|---|
| 2013 | PO | Apr 2013 | Chiasso (SUI) | Switzerland | Clay | Stefanie Vögele | W | 6–3, 6–4 |
| 2017 | WG2 | Feb 2017 | Kharkiv (UKR) | Ukraine | Hard (i) | Elina Svitolina | L | 6–4, 1–6, 2–6 |
| 2017 | PO2 | Apr 2017 | Zrenjanin (SRB) | Serbia | Hard (i) | Aleksandra Krunić | W | 6–4, 6–3 |
| 2018 | WG2 | Feb 2018 | Canberra (AUS) | Ukraine | Grass | Lyudmyla Kichenok | W | 4–6, 6–1, 6–4 |
| 2018 | WG2 | Feb 2018 | Canberra (AUS) | Ukraine | Grass | Marta Kostyuk | W | 6–2, 6–3 |
| 2018 | PO | Apr 2018 | Wollongong (AUS) | Netherlands | Hard (i) | Quirine Lemoine | W | 6–0, 6–2 |
| 2018 | PO | Apr 2018 | Wollongong (AUS) | Netherlands | Hard (i) | Lesley Kerkhove | W | 6–4, 6–2 |
| 2019 | WG QF | Feb 2019 | Asheville (USA) | United States | Hard (i) | Sofia Kenin | W | 6–1, 7–6 |
| 2019 | WG QF | Feb 2019 | Asheville (USA) | United States | Hard (i) | Madison Keys | W | 6–4, 6–1 |
| 2019 | WG SF | Apr 2019 | Brisbane (AUS) | Belarus | Hard | Victoria Azarenka | W | 7–6, 6–3 |
| 2019 | WG SF | Apr 2019 | Brisbane (AUS) | Belarus | Hard | Aryna Sabalenka | W | 6–2, 6–2 |
| 2019 | WG F | Nov 2019 | Perth (AUS) | France | Hard | Caroline Garcia | W | 6–0, 6–0 |
| 2019 | WG F | Nov 2019 | Perth (AUS) | France | Hard | Kristina Mladenovic | L | 6–2, 4–6, 6–7 |

=== Doubles: 9 (7–2) ===
| Edition | Round | Date | Location | Against | Surface | Partner | Opponents | W/L | Score |
|---|---|---|---|---|---|---|---|---|---|
| 2013 | WG QF | Feb 2013 | Ostrava (CZE) | Czech Republic | Hard (i) | Casey Dellacqua | Andrea Hlaváčková; Lucie Hradecká | L | 0–6, 6–7 |
| 2014 | WG QF | Feb 2014 | Hobart (AUS) | Russia | Hard | Casey Dellacqua | Irina Khromacheva; Valeria Solovyeva | W | 6–1, 6–3 |
| 2014 | WG SF | Feb 2014 | Brisbane (AUS) | Germany | Hard | Casey Dellacqua | Julia Görges; Anna-Lena Grönefeld | W | 6–2, 6–7, [10–2] |
| 2017 | WG2 | Feb 2017 | Kharkiv (UKR) | Ukraine | Hard (i) | Casey Dellacqua | Nadiia Kichenok; Olga Savchuk | W | 6–2, 2–6, [10–8] |
| 2017 | PO2 | Apr 2017 | Zrenjanin (SRB) | Serbia | Hard (i) | Casey Dellacqua | Ivana Jorović; Nina Stojanović | W | 6–1, 7–5 |
| 2018 | WG2 | Feb 2018 | Canberra (AUS) | Ukraine | Grass | Casey Dellacqua | Lyudmyla Kichenok; Nadiia Kichenok | W | 6–3, 6–4 |
| 2019 | WG QF | Feb 2019 | Asheville (USA) | United States | Hard (i) | Priscilla Hon | Danielle Collins; Nicole Melichar | W | 6–4, 7–5 |
| 2019 | WG SF | Apr 2019 | Brisbane (AUS) | Belarus | Hard | Samantha Stosur | Victoria Azarenka; Aryna Sabalenka | W | 7–5, 3–6, 6–2 |
| 2019 | WG F | Nov 2019 | Perth (AUS) | France | Hard | Samantha Stosur | Caroline Garcia; Kristina Mladenovic | L | 4–6, 3–6 |

== WTA Tour career earnings ==
Correct as of 21 March 2022

| Year | Grand Slam singles titles | WTA singles titles | Total singles titles | Earnings ($) | Money list rank |
|---|---|---|---|---|---|
| 2012 | 0 | 0 | 0 | 102,151 | 152 |
| 2013 | 0 | 0 | 0 | 540,652 | 46 |
| 2014 | 0 | 0 | 0 | 272,473 | 103 |
| 2016 | 0 | 0 | 0 | 33,666 | 306 |
| 2017 | 0 | 1 | 1 | 1,420,057 | 25 |
| 2018 | 0 | 2 | 2 | 2,823,371 | 11 |
| 2019 | 1 | 3 | 4 | 11,307,587 | 1 |
| 2020 | 0 | 1 | 1 | 1,078,902 | 12 |
| 2021 | 1 | 4 | 5 | 3,945,182 | 1 |
| 2022 | 1 | 1 | 2 | 2,289,320 | 9 |
| Career | 3 | 12 | 15 | 23,829,070 | 15 |

== Career Grand Slam tournament statistics ==
=== Best Grand Slam tournament results details ===
Grand Slam winners are in boldface, and runner-ups are in italics.

Australian Open
2022 Australian Open (1st seed)
| Round | Opponent | Rank | Score |
|---|---|---|---|
| 1R | (Ukraine) Lesia Tsurenko (Q) | 119 | 6–0, 6–1 |
| 2R | (Italy) Lucia Bronzetti (Q) | 142 | 6–1, 6–1 |
| 3R | (Italy) Camila Giorgi (30) | 33 | 6–2, 6–3 |
| 4R | (United States) Amanda Anisimova | 60 | 6–4, 6–3 |
| QF | (United States) Jessica Pegula (21) | 21 | 6–2, 6–0 |
| SF | (United States) Madison Keys | 51 | 6–1, 6–3 |
| **W** | (United States) Danielle Collins (27) | 30 | 6–3, 7–6^{(7–2)} |

Wimbledon Championships
2021 Wimbledon Championships (1st seed)
| Round | Opponent | Rank | Score |
|---|---|---|---|
| 1R | (Spain) Carla Suárez Navarro (PR) | 138 | 6–1, 6–7^{(1–7)}, 6–1 |
| 2R | (Russia) Anna Blinkova | 89 | 6–4, 6–3 |
| 3R | (Czech Republic) Kateřina Siniaková | 64 | 6–3, 7–5 |
| 4R | (Czech Republic) Barbora Krejčíková (14) | 17 | 7–5, 6–3 |
| QF | (Australia) Ajla Tomljanović | 75 | 6–1, 6–3 |
| SF | (Germany) Angelique Kerber (25) | 28 | 6–3, 7–6^{(7–3)} |
| **W** | (Czech Republic) Karolína Plíšková (8) | 13 | 6–3, 6–7^{(4–7)}, 6–3 |

French Open
2019 French Open (8th seed)
| Round | Opponent | Rank | Score |
|---|---|---|---|
| 1R | (United States) Jessica Pegula | 72 | 6–3, 6–3 |
| 2R | (United States) Danielle Collins | 36 | 7–5, 6–1 |
| 3R | (Germany) Andrea Petkovic | 69 | 6–3, 6–1 |
| 4R | (United States) Sofia Kenin | 35 | 6–3, 3–6, 6–0 |
| QF | (United States) Madison Keys (14) | 14 | 6–3, 7–5 |
| SF | (United States) Amanda Anisimova | 51 | 6–7^{(4–7)}, 6–3, 6–3 |
| **W** | (Czech Republic) Markéta Vondroušová | 38 | 6–1, 6–3 |

US Open
2018 US Open (18th seed)
| Round | Opponent | Rank | Score |
|---|---|---|---|
| 1R | (Tunisia) Ons Jabeur (Q) | 114 | 6–1, 6–3 |
| 2R | (Czech Republic) Lucie Šafářová | 69 | 7–5, 6–3 |
| 3R | (Czech Republic) Karolína Muchová (Q) | 202 | 6–3, 6–4 |
| 4R | (Czech Republic) Karolína Plíšková (8) | **8** | 4–6, 4–6 |
2019 US Open (2nd seed)
| Round | Opponent | Rank | Score |
| 1R | (Kazakhstan) Zarina Diyas | 80 | 1–6, 6–3, 6–2 |
| 2R | (United States) Lauren Davis | 73 | 6–2, 7–6^{(7–2)} |
| 3R | (Greece) Maria Sakkari (30) | 29 | 7–5, 6–3 |
| 4R | (China) Wang Qiang (18) | 18 | 2–6, 4–6 |

=== Career Grand Slam tournament seedings ===
The tournaments won by Barty are in boldface, and advanced into finals by Barty are in italics.

| Legend (slams won / times seeded) seeded No. 1 (**2** / 7) seeded No. 2 (0 / 1) seeded No. 3 seeded No. 4–10 (**1** / 1) seeded No. 11–32 (0 / 5) not seeded/WC (0 / 13) | Longest streak 5 1 0 1 5 5 |

| Year | Australian Open | French Open | Wimbledon | US Open |
|---|---|---|---|---|
| 2012 | not seeded | not seeded | not seeded | did not play |
| 2013 | not seeded | not seeded | did not qualify | not seeded |
| 2014 | not seeded | not seeded | did not qualify | not seeded |
| 2017 | not seeded | not seeded | not seeded | not seeded |
| 2018 | 18th | 17th | 17th | 18th |
| 2019 | 15th | **8th (1)** | 1st | 2nd |
| 2020 | 1st | did not play | cancelled | did not play |
| 2021 | 1st | 1st | **1st (2)** | 1st |
| 2022 | **1st (3)** | retired | | |

== Rivalries ==
=== Barty vs. Kvitová ===
List of all matches

| No. | Year | Tournament | Tier | Surface | Round | Winner | Score | A. B. | P. K. |
|---|---|---|---|---|---|---|---|---|---|
| 1. | 2012 | French Open | Grand Slam | Clay | 1R | Kvitová | 1–6, 2–6 | 0 | 1 |
| 2. | 2017 | Birmingham | Premier | Grass | F | Kvitová | 6–4, 3–6, 2–6 | 0 | 2 |
| 3. | 2019 | Sydney | Premier | Hard | F | Kvitová | 6–1, 5–7, 6–7^{(3–7)} | 0 | 3 |
| 4. | 2019 | Australian Open | Grand Slam | Hard | QF | Kvitová | 1–6, 4–6 | 0 | 4 |
| 5. | 2019 | Miami | Premier Mandatory | Hard | QF | Barty | 7–6^{(8–6)}, 3–6, 6–2 | 1 | 4 |
| 6. | 2019 | Beijing | Premier Mandatory | Hard | QF | Barty | 4–6, 6–4, 6–3 | 2 | 4 |
| 7. | 2019 | WTA Finals | Year-end championships | Hard (i) | RR | Barty | 6–4, 6–2 | 3 | 4 |
| 8. | 2020 | Australian Open | Grand Slam | Hard | QF | Barty | 7–6^{(8–6)}, 6–2 | 4 | 4 |
| 9. | 2020 | Qatar | Premier 5 | Hard | SF | Kvitová | 4–6, 6–2, 4–6 | 4 | 5 |
| 10. | 2021 | Madrid | WTA 1000 (Mandatory) | Clay | QF | Barty | 6–1, 3–6, 6–3 | 5 | 5 |

Barty and Petra Kvitová have met ten times, with the head-to-head currently tied 5–5. They first met in 2012 at the French Open where, in her second Grand Slam main draw appearance, Barty was defeated in straight sets. The pair's next clash came more than five years later, in 2017, in the final of Birmingham where Kvitová came back from a set down to claim the title, before replicating a similar victory in the Sydney final in 2019. They met once more two weeks later in the quarterfinals of the Australian Open where Kvitová moved past Barty in straight sets.

Barty then went on to record her first win two months later in the quarterfinals of the Miami Open. She then recorded a further three consecutive victories – in the quarterfinals of the 2019 China Open, in the round-robin stage of the 2019 WTA Finals, and in the quarterfinals of the 2020 Australian Open, the latter two in straight sets. Nonetheless, Kvitová snapped her losing streak in the semifinals of the Qatar Open, recording her fifth win over Barty in the process. This was the final match played by Barty in 2020, as she opted not to play again for the rest of the season due to the COVID-19 pandemic.

Barty and Kvitová resumed their rivalry at the 2021 Madrid Open with Barty prevailing in three sets, thus winning her fifth out of their last six matches.

=== Barty vs. Sabalenka ===
List of all matches

| No. | Year | Tournament | Tier | Surface | Round | Winner | Score | A. B. | A. S. |
|---|---|---|---|---|---|---|---|---|---|
| 1. | 2018 | Australian Open | Grand Slam | Hard | 1R | Barty | 6–7, 6–4, 6–4 | 1 | 0 |
| 2. | 2018 | Wuhan | Premier 5 | Hard | SF | Sabalenka | 7–6, 6–4 | 1 | 1 |
| 3. | 2018 | WTA Elite Trophy | Elite Trophy | Hard | RR | Sabalenka | 6–4, 6–4 | 1 | 2 |
| 4. | 2019 | Fed Cup | Fed Cup | Hard | SF | Barty | 6–2, 6–2 | 2 | 2 |
| 5. | 2019 | Wuhan | Premier 5 | Hard | SF | Sabalenka | 7–5, 6–4 | 2 | 3 |
| 6. | 2021 | Miami | WTA 1000 (Mandatory) | Hard | QF | Barty | 6–4, 6–7^{(5–7)}, 6–3 | 3 | 3 |
| 7. | 2021 | Stuttgart | WTA 500 | Clay (i) | F | Barty | 3–6, 6–0, 6–3 | 4 | 3 |
| 8. | 2021 | Madrid | WTA 1000 (Mandatory) | Clay | F | Sabalenka | 0–6, 6–3, 4–6 | 4 | 4 |

Barty and Aryna Sabalenka have met eight times, with the head to head currently tied 4–4. They first met in the first round of the Australian Open in 2018 where Barty needed three sets to defeat Sabalenka. Sabalenka then won the next two encounters later in the year; once in the semifinals of the Wuhan Open and then just a month later in the Round Robin of the WTA Elite Trophy, both in straight sets, however Barty did go on to win the latter tournament.

Barty then avenged those losses the year after at the Fed Cup, defeating her solidly in straight sets. They once again met each other in the semifinals of Wuhan, in a rematch of the previous years semifinal match, with Sabalenka taking the win once again. The next time they met was in the quarterfinals of the Miami Open in 2021 where Barty defeated her in three sets to defend her title. They then met in consecutive clay-court finals in the Stuttgart Open, where Barty prevailed, and the Madrid Open, where Sabalenka took her first WTA 1000 (Mandatory) title.

== Top 10 wins ==
Barty has a 26–21 (55%) record against players who were, at the time the match was played, ranked in the top 10.

| Season | 2017 | 2018 | 2019 | 2020 | 2021 | 2022 | Total |
|---|---|---|---|---|---|---|---|
| Wins | 4 | 1 | 12 | 1 | 7 | 1 | 26 |

| # | Player | Rk | Event | Surface | Rd | Score | Rk |
|---|---|---|---|---|---|---|---|
2017
| 1. | (United States) Venus Williams | 9 | Cincinnati Open, United States | Hard | 2R | 6–3, 2–6, 6–2 | 48 |
| 2. | (United Kingdom) Johanna Konta | 7 | Wuhan Open, China | Hard | 2R | 6–0, 4–6, 7–6^{(7–3)} | 37 |
| 3. | (Czech Republic) Karolína Plíšková | 4 | Wuhan Open, China | Hard | QF | 4–6, 7–6^{(7–3)}, 7–6^{(7–2)} | 37 |
| 4. | (Latvia) Jeļena Ostapenko | 10 | Wuhan Open, China | Hard | SF | 6–3, 6–0 | 37 |
2018
| 5. | (Germany) Angelique Kerber | 3 | Wuhan Open, China | Hard | 3R | 7–5, 6–1 | 17 |
2019
| 6. | (Romania) Simona Halep | 1 | Sydney International, Australia | Hard | 2R | 6–4, 6–4 | 15 |
| 7. | (Netherlands) Kiki Bertens | 9 | Sydney International, Australia | Hard | SF | 6–7^{(4–7)}, 6–4, 7–5 | 15 |
| 8. | (Netherlands) Kiki Bertens | 8 | Miami Open, United States | Hard | 4R | 4–6, 6–3, 6–2 | 11 |
| 9. | (Czech Republic) Petra Kvitová | 2 | Miami Open, United States | Hard | QF | 7–6^{(8–6)}, 3–6, 6–2 | 11 |
| 10. | (Czech Republic) Karolína Plíšková | 7 | Miami Open, United States | Hard | F | 7–6^{(7–1)}, 6–3 | 11 |
| 11. | (Belarus) Aryna Sabalenka | 10 | Fed Cup, Australia | Hard | SF | 6–2, 6–2 | 9 |
| 12. | (Czech Republic) Petra Kvitová | 7 | China Open, China | Hard | QF | 4–6, 6–4, 6–3 | 1 |
| 13. | (Netherlands) Kiki Bertens | 8 | China Open, China | Hard | SF | 6–3, 3–6, 7–6^{(9–7)} | 1 |
| 14. | (Switzerland) Belinda Bencic | 7 | WTA Finals, China | Hard (i) | RR | 5–7, 6–1, 6–2 | 1 |
| 15. | (Czech Republic) Petra Kvitová | 6 | WTA Finals, China | Hard (i) | RR | 6–4, 6–2 | 1 |
| 16. | (Czech Republic) Karolína Plíšková | 2 | WTA Finals, China | Hard (i) | SF | 4–6, 6–2, 6–3 | 1 |
| 17. | (Ukraine) Elina Svitolina | 8 | WTA Finals, China | Hard (i) | F | 6–4, 6–3 | 1 |
2020
| 18. | (Czech Republic) Petra Kvitová | 8 | Australian Open, Australia | Hard | QF | 7–6^{(8–6)}, 6–2 | 1 |
2021
| 19. | (Belarus) Aryna Sabalenka | 8 | Miami Open, United States | Hard | QF | 6–4, 6–7^{(5–7)}, 6–3 | 1 |
| 20. | (Ukraine) Elina Svitolina | 5 | Miami Open, United States | Hard | SF | 6–3, 6–3 | 1 |
| 21. | (Canada) Bianca Andreescu | 9 | Miami Open, United States | Hard | F | 6–3, 4–0 ret. | 1 |
| 22. | (Czech Republic) Karolína Plíšková | 9 | Stuttgart Open, Germany | Clay (i) | QF | 2–6, 6–1, 7–5 | 1 |
| 23. | (Ukraine) Elina Svitolina | 5 | Stuttgart Open, Germany | Clay (i) | SF | 4–6, 7–6^{(7–5)}, 6–2 | 1 |
| 24. | (Belarus) Aryna Sabalenka | 7 | Stuttgart Open, Germany | Clay (i) | F | 3–6, 6–0, 6–3 | 1 |
| 25. | (Czech Republic) Barbora Krejčíková | 10 | Cincinnati Open, United States | Hard | QF | 6–2, 6–4 | 1 |
2022
| 26. | (Poland) Iga Świątek | 9 | Adelaide International, Australia | Hard | SF | 6–2, 6–4 | 1 |

== Longest winning streaks ==
=== 15 match win streak (2019) ===
| # | Tournament | Category | Start date | Surface | Rd | Opponent | Rank | Score |
|---|---|---|---|---|---|---|---|---|
| – | Italian Open | Premier 5 | 13 May 2019 | Clay | 3R | (France) Kristina Mladenovic (Q) | 63 | 2–6, 3–6 |
| 1 | French Open | Grand Slam | 26 May 2019 | Clay | 1R | (United States) Jessica Pegula | 72 | 6–3, 6–3 |
| 2 | French Open | Grand Slam | 26 May 2019 | Clay | 2R | (United States) Danielle Collins | 36 | 7–5, 6–1 |
| 3 | French Open | Grand Slam | 26 May 2019 | Clay | 3R | (Germany) Andrea Petkovic | 69 | 6–3, 6–1 |
| 4 | French Open | Grand Slam | 26 May 2019 | Clay | 4R | (United States) Sofia Kenin | 35 | 6–3, 3–6, 6–0 |
| 5 | French Open | Grand Slam | 26 May 2019 | Clay | QF | (United States) Madison Keys (14) | 14 | 6–3, 7–5 |
| 6 | French Open | Grand Slam | 26 May 2019 | Clay | SF | (United States) Amanda Anisimova | 51 | 6–7^{(4–7)}, 6–3, 6–3 |
| 7 | French Open | Grand Slam | 26 May 2019 | Clay | F | (Czech Republic) Markéta Vondroušová | 38 | 6–1, 6–3 |
| 8 | Birmingham Classic | Premier | 17 June 2019 | Grass | 1R | (Croatia) Donna Vekić | 22 | 6–3, 6–4 |
| 9 | Birmingham Classic | Premier | 17 June 2019 | Grass | 2R | (United States) Jennifer Brady | 66 | 6–3, 6–1 |
| 10 | Birmingham Classic | Premier | 17 June 2019 | Grass | QF | (United States) Venus Williams (WC) | 55 | 6–4, 6–3 |
| 11 | Birmingham Classic | Premier | 17 June 2019 | Grass | SF | (Czech Republic) Barbora Strýcová | 51 | 6–4, 6–4 |
| 12 | Birmingham Classic | Premier | 17 June 2019 | Grass | F | (Germany) Julia Görges (8) | 19 | 6–3, 7–5 |
| 13 | Wimbledon Championships | Grand Slam | 1 July 2019 | Grass | 1R | (China) Zheng Saisai | 43 | 6–4, 6–2 |
| 14 | Wimbledon Championships | Grand Slam | 1 July 2019 | Grass | 2R | (Belgium) Alison Van Uytvanck | 58 | 6–1, 6–3 |
| 15 | Wimbledon Championships | Grand Slam | 1 July 2019 | Grass | 3R | (United Kingdom) Harriet Dart (WC) | 182 | 6–1, 6–1 |
| – | Wimbledon Championships | Grand Slam | 1 July 2019 | Grass | 4R | (United States) Alison Riske | 55 | 6–3, 3–6, 2–6 |

=== Double bagel matches (6–0, 6–0) ===
| Result | W–L | Year | Tournament | Tier | Surface | Opponent | vsRank | Round | Rank |
|---|---|---|---|---|---|---|---|---|---|
| Win | 1–0 | 2012 | ITF Ipswich, Australia | 25,000 | Clay | (Australia) Ashley Keir (Q) | 925 | 1R | 378 |
| Win | 2–0 | 2012 | ITF Bendigo, Australia | 25,000 | Hard | (Uzbekistan) Sabina Sharipova | 357 | 2R | 217 |
| Win | 3–0 | 2012 | ITF Toyota, Japan | 75,000+H | Carpet | (Japan) Risa Ozaki (Q) | 336 | 1R | 185 |
| Win | 4–0 | 2013 | ITF Pelham, USA | 25,000 | Clay | (Canada) Sharon Fichman (3) | 125 | QF | 197 |
| Win | 5–0 | 2016 | Nottingham Open, UK | International | Grass | (China) Xu Yifan | 278 | Q1 | 623 |
| Win | 6–0 | 2019 | Fed Cup, Perth, Australia | Team | Hard | (France) Caroline Garcia | 45 | F | 1 |
| Win | 7–0 | 2021 | Australian Open | Grand Slam | Hard | (Montenegro) Danka Kovinić | 82 | 1R | 1 |
