= 2018 Miami Open – Men's doubles =

Men's doubles
- 2018 Miami Open

Final
- Champions: (United States) Bob Bryan (United States) Mike Bryan
- Runners-up: (Russia) Karen Khachanov (Russia) Andrey Rublev
- Score: 4–6, 7–6^{(7–5)}, [10–4]

Events
Singles	men	women
Doubles	men	women
- Miami Open

Łukasz Kubot and Marcelo Melo were the defending champions, but lost in the first round to Steve Johnson and Sam Querrey.

Bob and Mike Bryan won the title, defeating Karen Khachanov and Andrey Rublev in the final, 4–6, 7–6^{(7–5)}, [10–4].

== Seeds ==
1. (Poland) Łukasz Kubot / (Brazil) Marcelo Melo (first round)
2. (Finland) Henri Kontinen / (Australia) John Peers (second round)
3. (Austria) Oliver Marach / (Croatia) Mate Pavić (quarterfinals)
4. (United States) Bob Bryan / (United States) Mike Bryan (champions)
5. (Netherlands) Jean-Julien Rojer / (Romania) Horia Tecău (second round)
6. (United Kingdom) Jamie Murray / (Brazil) Bruno Soares (second round)
7. (Croatia) Ivan Dodig / (United States) Rajeev Ram (first round)
8. (Colombia) Juan Sebastián Cabal / (Colombia) Robert Farah (quarterfinals)

== Draw ==
Key

- Q = Qualifier
- WC = Wild card
- LL = Lucky loser
- Alt = Alternate
- ITF = ITF entry
- PR = Protected ranking
- SR = Special ranking
- SE = Special exempt
- JE = Junior exempt
- JR = Junior Accelerator Programme entrant
- CO = College Accelerator Programme entrant
- NG = Next Gen Accelerator Program entrant
- w/o = Walkover
- r = Retired
- d = Defaulted

=== Finals ===
Semifinals
(United States) Steve Johnson (United States) Sam Querrey	3	1
(Russia) Karen Khachanov (Russia) Andrey Rublev	6	6
4	(United States) Bob Bryan (United States) Mike Bryan	7	6
(Japan) Ben McLachlan (Germany) Jan-Lennard Struff	5	4

Final
(Russia) Karen Khachanov (Russia) Andrey Rublev	6	6^{5}	[4]
4	(United States) Bob Bryan (United States) Mike Bryan	4	7^{7}	[10]

=== Top half ===
First round
1	(Poland) Ł Kubot (Brazil) M Melo	4	6^{0}
(United States) S Johnson (United States) S Querrey	6	7^{7}
(France) A Mannarino (Russia) D Medvedev	6	2	[12]
(India) R Bopanna (France) É Roger-Vasselin	4	6	[14]
(South Korea) H Chung (Canada) D Shapovalov	6	6^{5}	[10]
(Bosnia and Herzegovina) D Džumhur (Serbia) F Krajinović	3	7^{7}	[2]
WC	(Australia) N Kyrgios (Australia) M Reid	5	5
8	(Colombia) JS Cabal (Colombia) R Farah	7	7
3	(Austria) O Marach (Croatia) M Pavić	4	7^{7}	[11]
(Spain) F López (Spain) M López	6	6^{2}	[9]
(Germany) A Zverev (Germany) M Zverev	6	6
(Mexico) S González (Spain) F Verdasco	4	3
(Russia) K Khachanov (Russia) A Rublev	6^{3}	6	[15]
(France) F Martin (Croatia) F Škugor	7^{7}	3	[13]
(United States) R Harrison (Belarus) M Mirnyi	3	4
6	(United Kingdom) J Murray (Brazil) B Soares	6	6

Second round
(United States) S Johnson (United States) S Querrey	7^{7}	6
(India) R Bopanna (France) É Roger-Vasselin	6^{5}	2
(South Korea) H Chung (Canada) D Shapovalov
8	(Colombia) JS Cabal (Colombia) R Farah	w/o
3	(Austria) O Marach (Croatia) M Pavić	7^{7}	6
(Germany) A Zverev (Germany) M Zverev	6^{5}	4
(Russia) K Khachanov (Russia) A Rublev	4	7	[10]
6	(United Kingdom) J Murray (Brazil) B Soares	6	5	[2]

Quarterfinals
(United States) S Johnson (United States) S Querrey	6	6
8	(Colombia) JS Cabal (Colombia) R Farah	3	2
3	(Austria) O Marach (Croatia) M Pavić	4	6^{3}
(Russia) K Khachanov (Russia) A Rublev	6	7^{7}

Semifinals
(United States) S Johnson (United States) S Querrey	3	1
(Russia) K Khachanov (Russia) A Rublev	6	6

=== Bottom half ===
First round
7	(Croatia) I Dodig (United States) R Ram	6^{5}	4
(South Africa) R Klaasen (New Zealand) M Venus	7^{7}	6
(United States) J Isner (United States) D Young	6	7^{7}
(United Kingdom) K Edmund (Serbia) N Zimonjić	4	6^{1}
(Poland) M Matkowski (Pakistan) A-u-H Qureshi	7^{8}	6^{5}	[9]
(Argentina) L Mayer (Argentina) D Schwartzman	6^{6}	7^{7}	[11]
(New Zealand) M Daniell (United Kingdom) D Inglot	7^{7}	4	[3]
4	(United States) B Bryan (United States) M Bryan	6^{3}	6	[10]
5	(Netherlands) J-J Rojer (Romania) H Tecău	6	7^{7}
(United States) N Monroe (United States) J Sock	1	6^{2}
(Japan) B McLachlan (Germany) J-L Struff	6	7
WC	(Brazil) M Demoliner (Canada) D Nestor	4	5
(Croatia) N Mektić (Austria) A Peya	4	7	[10]
(Serbia) N Djokovic (Serbia) V Troicki	6	5	[3]
(Netherlands) R Haase (Netherlands) M Middelkoop	3	6	[6]
2	(Finland) H Kontinen (Australia) J Peers	6	3	[10]

Second round
(South Africa) R Klaasen (New Zealand) M Venus	7	6
(United States) J Isner (United States) D Young	5	3
(Argentina) L Mayer (Argentina) D Schwartzman	2	1
4	(United States) B Bryan (United States) M Bryan	6	6
5	(Netherlands) J-J Rojer (Romania) H Tecău	7^{7}	4	[7]
(Japan) B McLachlan (Germany) J-L Struff	6^{5}	6	[10]
(Croatia) N Mektić (Austria) A Peya	3	6	[10]
2	(Finland) H Kontinen (Australia) J Peers	6	3	[2]

Quarterfinals
(South Africa) R Klaasen (New Zealand) M Venus	6	6^{5}	[8]
4	(United States) B Bryan (United States) M Bryan	3	7^{7}	[10]
(Japan) B McLachlan (Germany) J-L Struff	6	7^{7}
(Croatia) N Mektić (Austria) A Peya	1	6^{4}

Semifinals
4	(United States) B Bryan (United States) M Bryan	7	6
(Japan) B McLachlan (Germany) J-L Struff	5	4
