= 2017 Malaysian Open =

- Date: 27 February – 5 March
- Edition: 8th
- Category: WTA International tournaments
- Draw: 32S / 16D
- Prize money: $250,000
- Surface: Hard
- Location: Kuala Lumpur, Malaysia
- Venue: Kuala Lumpur Golf & Country Club (KLGCC)

Champions

Singles
- (Australia) Ashleigh Barty

Doubles
- (Australia) Ashleigh Barty / (Australia) Casey Dellacqua
← 2016 ·	Malaysian Open

The 2017 Alya Malaysian Open was a women's tennis tournament played on outdoor hard courts. It was the 8th edition of the Malaysian Open and an International tournament on the 2017 WTA Tour. The tournament took place from 27 February to 5 March 2017 at the Kuala Lumpur Golf & Country Club (KLGCC).

== Finals ==
=== Singles ===
- (Australia) Ashleigh Barty defeated (Japan) Nao Hibino, 6–3, 6–2

=== Doubles ===
- (Australia) Ashleigh Barty / (Australia) Casey Dellacqua defeated (United States) Nicole Melichar / (Japan) Makoto Ninomiya, 7–6^{(7–5)}, 6–3

== Points and prize money distribution ==
=== Points distribution ===
Event	W	F	SF	QF	Round of 16	Round of 32	Q	Q3	Q2	Q1
Singles	280	180	110	60	30	1	18	14	10	1
Doubles	280	180	110	60	1	—	—	—	—	—

=== Prize money ===
Event	W	F	SF	QF	Round of 16	Round of 32	Q2	Q1
Singles	$43,000	$21,400	$11,500	$6,175	$3,400	$2,100	$1,020	$600
Doubles	$12,300	$6,400	$3,435	$1,820	$960	—	—	—

== Singles main-draw entrants ==
=== Seeds ===
Country	Player	Ranking^{1}	Seeds
UKR	Elina Svitolina	13	1
ESP	Carla Suárez Navarro	14	2
FRA	Caroline Garcia	24	3
CHN	Peng Shuai	57	4
CHN	Duan Yingying	68	5
CHN	Wang Qiang	76	6
BEL	Elise Mertens	80	7
TUR	Çağla Büyükakçay	81	8

- ^{1} Rankings as of February 20, 2017.

=== Other entrants ===
The following players received wildcards into the singles main draw:

- (Kazakhstan) Zarina Diyas
- (Ukraine) Katarina Zavatska
- (China) Zheng Saisai

The following players received entry from the qualifying draw:

- (Australia) Ashleigh Barty
- (South Korea) Jang Su-jeong
- (Russia) Anna Kalinskaya
- (Japan) Miyu Kato
- (Netherlands) Lesley Kerkhove
- (Uzbekistan) Sabina Sharipova

=== Withdrawals ===
Before the tournament

- (Romania) Sorana Cîrstea →replaced by (China) Zhu Lin
- (United States) Vania King →replaced by (Spain) Sílvia Soler Espinosa
- (Italy) Karin Knapp →replaced by (Spain) Sara Sorribes Tormo
- (Japan) Kurumi Nara →replaced by (Serbia) Nina Stojanović
- (Kazakhstan) Yulia Putintseva →replaced by (Belgium) Maryna Zanevska
- (Russia) Evgeniya Rodina →replaced by (Serbia) Aleksandra Krunić
- (Greece) Maria Sakkari →replaced by (China) Zhang Kailin

During the tournament

- (Ukraine) Elina Svitolina (left lower leg injury)

=== Retirements ===
- (China) Peng Shuai

== Doubles main-draw entrants ==
=== Seeds ===
Country	Player	Country	Player	Rank	Seed
CHN	Liang Chen	CHN	Zheng Saisai	92	1
JPN	Shuko Aoyama	CHN	Yang Zhaoxuan	103	2
ARG	María Irigoyen	POL	Paula Kania	139	3
USA	Nicole Melichar	JPN	Makoto Ninomiya	148	4

- Rankings as of February 20, 2017.

=== Other entrants ===
The following pair received wildcard into the doubles main draw:

- (Indonesia) Beatrice Gumulya / (Malaysia) Theiviya Selvarajoo
- (Malaysia) Jawairiah Noordin / (Indonesia) Jessy Rompies
