= 2018 Miami Open – Men's singles =

Men's singles
- 2018 Miami Open

Final
- Champion: (United States) John Isner
- Runner-up: (Germany) Alexander Zverev
- Score: 6–7^{(4–7)}, 6–4, 6–4

Details
- Draw: 96 (12 Q / 5 WC )
- Seeds: 32

Events
Singles	men	women
Doubles	men	women
← 2017 ·	Miami Open	· 2019 →

John Isner defeated Alexander Zverev in the final, 6–7^{(4–7)}, 6–4, 6–4 to win the men's singles tennis title at the 2018 Miami Open. It was Isner's first and only Masters 1000 title, and he became the first new Miami Open champion in nine years.

Roger Federer was the defending champion, but lost in the second round to Thanasi Kokkinakis.

Federer and Rafael Nadal (despite having withdrawn from the event) were in contention for the ATP No. 1 singles ranking. Nadal regained the top ranking as a result of Federer's second-round loss.

With Novak Djokovic and Federer losing their opening matches and Andy Murray and Nadal missing the tournament due to injuries, this was the first time since the 2004 Paris Masters that none of the Big Four won a match at a Masters 1000 tournament.

== Seeds ==
All seeds receive a bye into the second round.

1. (Switzerland) Roger Federer (second round)
2. (Croatia) Marin Čilić (fourth round)
3. (Bulgaria) Grigor Dimitrov (third round)
4. (Germany) Alexander Zverev (final)
5. (Argentina) Juan Martín del Potro (semifinals)
6. (South Africa) Kevin Anderson (quarterfinals)
7. (Belgium) David Goffin (second round)
8. (United States) Jack Sock (third round)
9. (Serbia) Novak Djokovic (second round)
10. (Czech Republic) Tomáš Berdych (third round)
11. (United States) Sam Querrey (third round)
12. (Spain) Roberto Bautista Agut (second round)
13. (Argentina) Diego Schwartzman (third round)
14. (United States) John Isner (champion)
15. (Italy) Fabio Fognini (third round)
16. (Spain) Pablo Carreño Busta (semifinals)

17. (Australia) Nick Kyrgios (fourth round)
18. (France) Adrian Mannarino (second round)
19. (South Korea) Chung Hyeon (quarterfinals)
20. (Canada) Milos Raonic (quarterfinals)
21. (United Kingdom) Kyle Edmund (second round)
22. (Serbia) Filip Krajinović (fourth round)
23. (Luxembourg) Gilles Müller (second round)
24. (Bosnia and Herzegovina) Damir Džumhur (second round)
25. (Spain) Feliciano López (second round)
26. (Japan) Kei Nishikori (third round)
27. (Russia) Andrey Rublev (second round)
28. (Spain) David Ferrer (third round)
29. (Croatia) Borna Ćorić (quarterfinals)
30. (France) Richard Gasquet (second round)
31. (Spain) Fernando Verdasco (fourth round)
32. (Russia) Karen Khachanov (third round)

Click on the seed number of a player to go to their draw section.

== Draw ==
=== Key ===
- Q = Qualifier
- WC = Wild card
- LL = Lucky loser
- Alt = Alternate
- SE = Special exempt
- PR = Protected ranking
- ITF = ITF entry
- JE = Junior exempt
- w/o = Walkover
- r = Retired
- d = Defaulted
- SR = Special ranking

=== Finals ===
Quarterfinals
16	(Spain) Pablo Carreño Busta	6	5	7^{8}
6	(South Africa) Kevin Anderson	4	7	6^{6}
4	(Germany) Alexander Zverev	6	6
29	(Croatia) Borna Ćorić	4	4
5	(Argentina) Juan Martín del Potro	5	7^{7}	7^{7}
20	(Canada) Milos Raonic	7	6^{1}	6^{3}
19	(South Korea) Chung Hyeon	1	4
14	(United States) John Isner	6	6

Semifinals
16	(Spain) Pablo Carreño Busta	6^{4}	2
4	(Germany) Alexander Zverev	7^{7}	6
5	(Argentina) Juan Martín del Potro	1	6^{2}
14	(United States) John Isner	6	7^{7}

Final
4	(Germany) Alexander Zverev	7^{7}	4	4
14	(United States) John Isner	6^{4}	6	6

=== Top half ===
==== Section 1 ====
First round
Q	(France) C Hemery	1	2
Q	(Australia) T Kokkinakis	6	6
(Spain) G García López	7^{7}	7^{8}
(United States) T Sandgren	6^{3}	6^{6}
(United States) S Johnson	6	6
(Dominican Republic) V Estrella Burgos	3	3
(Uzbekistan) D Istomin	7	6
WC	(Serbia) M Kecmanović	5	4

Second round
1	(Switzerland) R Federer	6	3	6^{4}
Q	(Australia) T Kokkinakis	3	6	7^{7}
(Spain) G García López	6	0	2
31	(Spain) F Verdasco	4	6	6
18	(France) A Mannarino	3	3
(United States) S Johnson	6	6
(Uzbekistan) D Istomin	1	0
16	(Spain) P Carreño Busta	6	6

Third round
Q	(Australia) T Kokkinakis	6	4	6^{4}
31	(Spain) F Verdasco	3	6	7^{7}
(United States) S Johnson	4	4
16	(Spain) P Carreño Busta	6	6

Fourth round
31	(Spain) F Verdasco	0	3
16	(Spain) P Carreño Busta	6	6

==== Section 2 ====
First round
Q	(Australia) A de Minaur	2	4
PR	(Japan) Y Nishioka	6	6
(Argentina) N Kicker	3	6^{4}
(United States) F Tiafoe	6	7^{7}
(Romania) M Copil	7^{7}	6
(Kazakhstan) M Kukushkin	6^{2}	4
(Italy) T Fabbiano	6	2	5
(Georgia (country)) N Basilashvili	1	6	7

Second round
10	(Czech Republic) T Berdych	6	6
PR	(Japan) Y Nishioka	1	4
(United States) F Tiafoe	7^{7}	4	7^{7}
21	(United Kingdom) K Edmund	6^{4}	6	6^{5}
32	(Russia) K Khachanov	7	6
(Romania) M Copil	5	3
(Georgia (country)) N Basilashvili	4	3
6	(South Africa) K Anderson	6	6

Third round
10	(Czech Republic) T Berdych	7^{7}	2	6^{1}
(United States) F Tiafoe	6^{2}	6	7^{7}
32	(Russia) K Khachanov	6	2	3
6	(South Africa) K Anderson	4	6	6

Fourth round
(United States) F Tiafoe	6^{3}	4
6	(South Africa) K Anderson	7^{7}	6

==== Section 3 ====
First round
(Greece) S Tsitsipas	6	4	2
(Russia) D Medvedev	2	6	6
(Russia) E Donskoy	7	6
(Slovenia) A Bedene	5	4
(Serbia) D Lajović	3	7^{7}	6
(Argentina) H Zeballos	6	6^{2}	4
WC	(Spain) N Kuhn	7^{7}	6
Q	(Barbados) D King	6^{4}	4

Second round
4	(Germany) A Zverev	6	1	7^{7}
(Russia) D Medvedev	4	6	6^{5}
(Russia) E Donskoy	2	2
28	(Spain) D Ferrer	6	6
17	(Australia) N Kyrgios	6	6
(Serbia) D Lajović	4	1
WC	(Spain) N Kuhn	2	4
15	(Italy) F Fognini	6	6

Third round
4	(Germany) A Zverev	2	6	6
28	(Spain) D Ferrer	6	2	4
17	(Australia) N Kyrgios	6	6
15	(Italy) F Fognini	3	3

Fourth round
4	(Germany) A Zverev	6	6
17	(Australia) N Kyrgios	4	4

==== Section 4 ====
First round
Q	(Lithuania) R Berankis	1	6	6^{4}
(Moldova) R Albot	6	4	7^{7}
(Canada) D Shapovalov	6	6^{4}	7^{8}
(Serbia) V Troicki	3	7^{7}	6^{6}
(Argentina) L Mayer	3	6	6
(United States) D Young	6	4	2
Q	(India) Y Bhambri	7	6
LL	(Bosnia and Herzegovina) M Bašić	5	3

Second round
11	(United States) S Querrey	7^{7}	6
(Moldova) R Albot	6^{4}	1
(Canada) D Shapovalov	6	7
24	(Bosnia and Herzegovina) D Džumhur	1	5
29	(Croatia) B Ćorić	6^{5}	6	6
(Argentina) L Mayer	7^{7}	3	4
Q	(India) Y Bhambri	3	6^{3}
8	(United States) J Sock	6	7^{7}

Third round
11	(United States) S Querrey	4	6	5
(Canada) D Shapovalov	6	3	7
29	(Croatia) B Ćorić	5	7^{7}	6
8	(United States) J Sock	7	6^{4}	3

Fourth round
(Canada) D Shapovalov	6^{2}	6	4
29	(Croatia) B Ćorić	7^{7}	4	6

=== Bottom half ===
==== Section 5 ====
First round
(Japan) Y Sugita	4	6	1
(Netherlands) R Haase	6	3	6
Q	(Australia) J Millman	2	6	6
(Germany) P Gojowczyk	6	4	4
Q	(United States) B Fratangelo	6^{5}	3
Q	(United Kingdom) L Broady	7^{7}	6
(Germany) M Zverev	6	1	2
(France) B Paire	1	6	6

Second round
5	(Argentina) JM del Potro	6	5	6
(Netherlands) R Haase	4	7	2
Q	(Australia) J Millman	6^{4}	6	3
26	(Japan) K Nishikori	7^{7}	4	6
22	(Serbia) F Krajinović	6	6
Q	(United Kingdom) L Broady	3	2
(France) B Paire	6	6
9	(Serbia) N Djokovic	3	4

Third round
5	(Argentina) JM del Potro	6	6
26	(Japan) K Nishikori	2	2
22	(Serbia) F Krajinović	6	6
(France) B Paire	3	3

Fourth round
5	(Argentina) JM del Potro	6	6
22	(Serbia) F Krajinović	4	2

==== Section 6 ====
First round
Q	(United Kingdom) C Norrie	6^{3}	2
(Chile) N Jarry	7^{7}	6
WC	(Sweden) M Ymer	3	7	6
(Germany) J-L Struff	6	5	1
(France) J Chardy	6	7^{7}
Q	(Brazil) R Dutra Silva	3	6^{2}
(Hungary) M Fucsovics	4	4
(Germany) M Marterer	6	6

Second round
13	(Argentina) D Schwartzman	6	6
(Chile) N Jarry	3	1
WC	(Sweden) M Ymer	3	3
20	(Canada) M Raonic	6	6
30	(France) R Gasquet	5	1
(France) J Chardy	7	6
(Germany) M Marterer	6	2	1
3	(Bulgaria) G Dimitrov	4	6	6

Third round
13	(Argentina) D Schwartzman	6^{5}	3
20	(Canada) M Raonic	7^{7}	6
(France) J Chardy	6	6
3	(Bulgaria) G Dimitrov	4	4

Fourth round
20	(Canada) M Raonic	6	6
(France) J Chardy	3	4

==== Section 7 ====
First round
(United States) R Harrison	6^{4}	6^{4}
(Portugal) J Sousa	7^{7}	7^{7}
(United States) J Donaldson	6	6
WC	(Cyprus) M Baghdatis	3	4
(Australia) M Ebden	6	6^{2}	7
(France) G Simon	3	7^{7}	5
WC	(United States) C Eubanks	6	4	4
Q	(United States) M Mmoh	4	6	6

Second round
7	(Belgium) D Goffin	0	1
(Portugal) J Sousa	6	6
(United States) J Donaldson	6	6
25	(Spain) F López	4	2
19	(South Korea) H Chung	6	7
(Australia) M Ebden	3	5
Q	(United States) M Mmoh	7^{7}	2	6
12	(Spain) R Bautista Agut	6^{4}	6	4

Third round
(Portugal) J Sousa	1	6	6
(United States) J Donaldson	6	3	4
19	(South Korea) H Chung	6	6
Q	(United States) M Mmoh	1	1

Fourth round
(Portugal) J Sousa	4	3
19	(South Korea) H Chung	6	6

==== Section 8 ====
First round
(Czech Republic) J Veselý	7^{7}	6
(Slovakia) L Lacko	6^{2}	3
(Argentina) G Pella	6^{3}	6^{2}
(Russia) M Youzhny	7^{7}	7^{7}
(Croatia) I Karlović	6^{4}	6^{5}
(Canada) V Pospisil	7^{7}	7^{7}
(France) P-H Herbert	7^{7}	6
(United States) T Fritz	6^{4}	4

Second round
14	(United States) J Isner	7^{7}	1	6
(Czech Republic) J Veselý	6^{3}	6	3
(Russia) M Youzhny	4	6	6
23	(Luxembourg) G Müller	6	4	2
27	(Russia) A Rublev	6^{5}	4
(Canada) V Pospisil	7^{7}	6
(France) P-H Herbert	5	3
2	(Croatia) M Čilić	7	6

Third round
14	(United States) J Isner	6	6
(Russia) M Youzhny	4	3
(Canada) V Pospisil	5	6^{4}
2	(Croatia) M Čilić	7	7^{7}

Fourth round
14	(United States) J Isner	7^{7}	6
2	(Croatia) M Čilić	6^{0}	3

== Qualifying ==
=== Seeds ===
1. (Spain) Roberto Carballés Baena (first round)
2. (Bosnia and Herzegovina) Mirza Bašić (qualifying competition, lucky loser)
3. (Australia) John Millman (qualified)
4. (Brazil) Rogério Dutra Silva (qualified)
5. (Portugal) Gastão Elias (first round)
6. (Lithuania) Ričardas Berankis (qualified)
7. (Italy) Matteo Berrettini (first round)
8. (Japan) Taro Daniel (qualifying competition)
9. (India) Yuki Bhambri (qualified)
10. (United Kingdom) Cameron Norrie (qualified)
11. (United States) Bjorn Fratangelo (qualified)
12. (Belgium) Ruben Bemelmans (qualifying competition)
13. (United States) Ernesto Escobedo (qualifying competition)
14. (Ukraine) Sergiy Stakhovsky (qualifying competition)
15. (Germany) Yannick Hanfmann (first round)
16. (Brazil) Thiago Monteiro (first round)
17. (Switzerland) Henri Laaksonen (first round)
18. (United States) Tim Smyczek (first round)
19. (Sweden) Elias Ymer (qualifying competition)
20. (Argentina) Carlos Berlocq (qualifying competition)
21. (Canada) Peter Polansky (qualifying competition)
22. (India) Ramkumar Ramanathan (first round)
23. (Australia) Alex de Minaur (qualified)
24. (United States) Mackenzie McDonald (qualifying competition)

=== Qualifiers ===
1. (Barbados) Darian King
2. (United States) Michael Mmoh
3. (Australia) John Millman
4. (Brazil) Rogério Dutra Silva
5. (France) Calvin Hemery
6. (Lithuania) Ričardas Berankis
7. (United Kingdom) Liam Broady
8. (Australia) Thanasi Kokkinakis
9. (India) Yuki Bhambri
10. (United Kingdom) Cameron Norrie
11. (United States) Bjorn Fratangelo
12. (Australia) Alex de Minaur

=== Lucky loser ===
1. (Bosnia and Herzegovina) Mirza Bašić

=== Qualifying draw ===
==== First qualifier ====
First round
1	(Spain) Roberto Carballés Baena	6	2	4
(Barbados) Darian King	2	6	6
(Canada) Félix Auger-Aliassime	6	2	6^{6}
24	(United States) Mackenzie McDonald	3	6	7^{8}

Qualifying competition
(Barbados) Darian King	2	6	6
24	(United States) Mackenzie McDonald	6	4	4

==== Second qualifier ====
First round
2	(Bosnia and Herzegovina) Mirza Bašić	6	6
(United States) Dennis Novikov	4	4
(United States) Michael Mmoh	7^{7}	6
22	(India) Ramkumar Ramanathan	6^{4}	4

Qualifying competition
2	(Bosnia and Herzegovina) Mirza Bašić	5	6^{2}
(United States) Michael Mmoh	7	7^{7}

==== Third qualifier ====
First round
3	(Australia) John Millman	6	7^{10}
(Norway) Casper Ruud	3	6^{8}
(France) Gleb Sakharov	0	3
13	(United States) Ernesto Escobedo	6	6

Qualifying competition
3	(Australia) John Millman	6	6
13	(United States) Ernesto Escobedo	1	2

==== Fourth qualifier ====
First round
4	(Brazil) Rogério Dutra Silva	6	5	6
(United States) Kevin King	2	7	2
(United States) Reilly Opelka	6^{8}	3
21	(Canada) Peter Polansky	7^{10}	6

Qualifying competition
4	(Brazil) Rogério Dutra Silva	6	6^{5}	6
21	(Canada) Peter Polansky	3	7^{7}	4

==== Fifth qualifier ====
First round
5	(Portugal) Gastão Elias	5	4
(United States) Denis Kudla	7	6
(France) Calvin Hemery	6	6
15	(Germany) Yannick Hanfmann	3	1

Qualifying competition
(United States) Denis Kudla	6	4	5
(France) Calvin Hemery	4	6	7

==== Sixth qualifier ====
First round
6	(Lithuania) Ričardas Berankis	7^{7}	6
(Slovakia) Norbert Gombos	6^{1}	0
Alt	(United States) Evan King	3	6	6^{5}
14	(Ukraine) Sergiy Stakhovsky	6	4	7^{7}

Qualifying competition
6	(Lithuania) Ričardas Berankis	3	6	6
14	(Ukraine) Sergiy Stakhovsky	6	3	0

==== Seventh qualifier ====
First round
7	(Italy) Matteo Berrettini	6	3	4
(Canada) Filip Peliwo	3	6	6
(United Kingdom) Liam Broady	6	6
17	(Switzerland) Henri Laaksonen	2	4

Qualifying competition
(Canada) Filip Peliwo	4	6^{2}
(United Kingdom) Liam Broady	6	7^{7}

==== Eighth qualifier ====
First round
8	(Japan) Taro Daniel	6	6
(United States) Bradley Klahn	4	4
WC	(Australia) Thanasi Kokkinakis	6	6
16	(Brazil) Thiago Monteiro	2	3

Qualifying competition
8	(Japan) Taro Daniel	5	5
WC	(Australia) Thanasi Kokkinakis	7	7

==== Ninth qualifier ====
First round
9	(India) Yuki Bhambri	6	6
(Argentina) Renzo Olivo	4	1
PR	(Colombia) Santiago Giraldo	6^{9}	4
19/WC	(Sweden) Elias Ymer	7^{11}	6

Qualifying competition
9	(India) Yuki Bhambri	7	6
19/WC	(Sweden) Elias Ymer	5	2

==== Tenth qualifier ====
First round
10	(United Kingdom) Cameron Norrie	6	2
(United States) Stefan Kozlov	1	0^{r}
WC	(United States) Patrick Kypson	6	6
18	(United States) Tim Smyczek	4	3

Qualifying competition
10	(United Kingdom) Cameron Norrie	6^{5}	6	6
WC	(United States) Patrick Kypson	7^{7}	3	1

==== Eleventh qualifier ====
First round
11	(United States) Bjorn Fratangelo	4	6	6
Alt	(Serbia) Peđa Krstin	6	3	0
(Australia) Akira Santillan	3	3
20	(Argentina) Carlos Berlocq	6	6

Qualifying competition
11	(United States) Bjorn Fratangelo	7^{8}	6
20	(Argentina) Carlos Berlocq	6^{6}	4

==== Twelfth qualifier ====
First round
12	(Belgium) Ruben Bemelmans	7	6
WC	(Brazil) João Souza	5	3
WC	(Argentina) Axel Geller	4	0
23	(Australia) Alex de Minaur	6	6

Qualifying competition
12	(Belgium) Ruben Bemelmans	4	3
23	(Australia) Alex de Minaur	6	6
