= 2018 Miami Open =

- Date: March 19 – April 1
- Edition: 34th
- Category: Masters 1000 (ATP); Premier Mandatory (WTA)
- Draw: 96S / 48Q / 32D
- Prize money: $7,972,535 (ATP) $7,972,535 (WTA)
- Surface: Hard - outdoor
- Location: Key Biscayne, Florida, United States
- Venue: Tennis Center at Crandon Park

Champions

Men's singles
- (United States) John Isner

Women's singles
- (United States) Sloane Stephens

Men's doubles
- (United States) Bob Bryan / (United States) Mike Bryan

Women's doubles
- (Australia) Ashleigh Barty / (United States) CoCo Vandeweghe
- Miami Open

The 2018 Miami Open presented by Itaú (also known as 2018 Miami Masters) was a professional men and women's tennis tournament played on outdoor hard courts. It was the 34th edition of the Miami Open, and part of the Masters 1000 category on the 2018 ATP World Tour, and of the Premier Mandatory category on the 2018 WTA Tour. All men and women's events took place at the Tennis Center at Crandon Park in Key Biscayne, Florida, United States, from March 19 through April 1, 2018. It was the last time the tournament was played at the Tennis Center at Crandon Park. The tournament moved to the Hard Rock Stadium starting in 2019.

== Finals ==
=== Men's singles ===
- (United States) John Isner defeated (Germany) Alexander Zverev, 6–7^{(4–7)}, 6–4, 6–4

=== Women's singles ===
- (United States) Sloane Stephens defeated (Latvia) Jeļena Ostapenko, 7–6^{(7–5)}, 6–1

=== Men's doubles ===
- (United States) Bob Bryan / (United States) Mike Bryan defeated (Russia) Karen Khachanov / (Russia) Andrey Rublev, 4–6, 7–6^{(7–5)}, [10–4]

=== Women's doubles ===
- (Australia) Ashleigh Barty / (United States) CoCo Vandeweghe defeated (Czech Republic) Barbora Krejčíková / (Czech Republic) Kateřina Siniaková, 6–2, 6–1

== Points and prize money ==
=== Point distribution ===
Event	W	F	SF	QF	Round of 16	Round of 32	Round of 64	Round of 128	Q	Q2	Q1
Men's singles	1000	600	360	180	90	45	25*	10	16	8	0
Men's doubles	1000	600	360	180	90	0	—N/a	—N/a	—N/a	—N/a	—N/a
Women's singles	1000	650	390	215	120	65	35*	10	30	20	2
Women's Doubles	1000	650	390	215	120	10	—N/a	—N/a	—N/a	—N/a	—N/a

- Players with byes receive first round points.

=== Prize money ===
Event	W	F	SF	QF	Round of 16	Round of 32	Round of 64	Round of 128	Q2	Q1
Men's singles	$1,340,860	$654,380	$327,965	$167,195	$88,135	$47,170	$25,465	$15,610	$4,650	$2,380
Women's singles	$1,340,860	$654,380	$327,965	$167,195	$88,135	$47,170	$25,465	$15,610	$4,650	$2,380
Men's doubles	$439,350	$214,410	$107,470	$54,760	$28,880	$15,460	—N/a	—N/a	—N/a	—N/a
Women's doubles	$439,350	$214,410	$107,470	$54,760	$28,880	$15,460	—N/a	—N/a	—N/a	—N/a

== ATP singles main-draw entrants ==
=== Seeds ===
The following are the seeded players. Rankings and seedings are based on ATP rankings as of March 19, 2018.

Seed	Rank	Player	Points before	Points defending	Points won	Points after	Status
1	1	(Switzerland) Roger Federer	9,660	1,000	10	8,670	Second round lost to (Australia) Thanasi Kokkinakis [Q]
2	3	(Croatia) Marin Čilić	4,905	10	90	4,985	Fourth round lost to (United States) John Isner [14]
3	4	(Bulgaria) Grigor Dimitrov	4,600	10	45	4,635	Third round lost to (France) Jérémy Chardy
4	5	(Germany) Alexander Zverev	4,505	180	600	4,925	Runner-up, lost to (United States) John Isner [14]
5	6	(Argentina) Juan Martín del Potro	4,155	45	360	4,470	Semifinals lost to (United States) John Isner [14]
6	8	(South Africa) Kevin Anderson	3,235	25	180	3,390	Quarterfinals lost to (Spain) Pablo Carreño Busta [16]
7	9	(Belgium) David Goffin	3,190	90	10	3,110	Second round lost to (Portugal) João Sousa
8	11	(United States) Jack Sock	2,335	180	45	2,200	Third round lost to (Croatia) Borna Ćorić [29]
9	12	(Serbia) Novak Djokovic	2,300	0	10	2,310	Second round lost to (France) Benoît Paire
10	13	(Czech Republic) Tomáš Berdych	2,275	180	45	2,140	Third round lost to (United States) Frances Tiafoe
11	14	(United States) Sam Querrey	2,265	45	45	2,265	Third round lost to (Canada) Denis Shapovalov
12	15	(Spain) Roberto Bautista Agut	2,255	90	10	2,175	Second round lost to (United States) Michael Mmoh [Q]
13	16	(Argentina) Diego Schwartzman	2,220	45	45	2,220	Third round lost to (Canada) Milos Raonic [20]
14	17	(United States) John Isner	2,170	45	1,000	3,125	Champion, defeated (Germany) Alexander Zverev [4]
15	18	(Italy) Fabio Fognini	2,155	360	45	1,840	Third round lost to (Australia) Nick Kyrgios [17]
16	19	(Spain) Pablo Carreño Busta	2,045	10	360	2,395	Semifinals lost to (Germany) Alexander Zverev [4]
17	20	(Australia) Nick Kyrgios	1,945	360	90	1,675	Fourth round lost to (Germany) Alexander Zverev [4]
18	22	(France) Adrian Mannarino	1,735	90	10	1,655	Second round lost to (United States) Steve Johnson
19	23	(South Korea) Chung Hyeon	1,727	10	180	1,897	Quarterfinals lost to (United States) John Isner [14]
20	25	(Canada) Milos Raonic	1,630	45	180	1,765	Quarterfinals lost to (Argentina) Juan Martín del Potro [5]
21	26	(United Kingdom) Kyle Edmund	1,627	10	10	1,627	Second round lost to (United States) Frances Tiafoe
22	27	(Serbia) Filip Krajinović	1,539	(13)^{†}	90	1,616	Fourth round lost to (Argentina) Juan Martín del Potro [5]
23	28	(Luxembourg) Gilles Müller	1,500	45	10	1,465	Second round lost to (Russia) Mikhail Youzhny
24	30	(Bosnia and Herzegovina) Damir Džumhur	1,430	25	10	1,415	Second round lost to (Canada) Denis Shapovalov
25	32	(Spain) Feliciano López	1,420	10	10	1,420	Second round lost to (United States) Jared Donaldson
26	33	(Japan) Kei Nishikori	1,415	180	45	1,280	Third round lost to (Argentina) Juan Martín del Potro [5]
27	34	(Russia) Andrey Rublev	1,393	25	10	1,378	Second round lost to (Canada) Vasek Pospisil
28	35	(Spain) David Ferrer	1,370	10	45	1,405	Third round lost to (Germany) Alexander Zverev [4]
29	36	(Croatia) Borna Ćorić	1,366	45	180	1,501	Quarterfinals lost to (Germany) Alexander Zverev [4]
30	37	(France) Richard Gasquet	1,305	(20)^{‡}	10	1,295	Second round lost to (France) Jérémy Chardy
31	39	(Spain) Fernando Verdasco	1,260	45	90	1,305	Fourth round lost to (Spain) Pablo Carreño Busta [16]
32	41	(Russia) Karen Khachanov	1,220	10	45	1,255	Third round lost to (South Africa) Kevin Anderson [6]

† The player did not qualify for the tournament in 2017. Accordingly, points for his 18th best result are deducted instead.
‡ The player used an exemption to skip the tournament in 2017. Accordingly, points for his 18th best result are deducted instead.

=== Withdrawals ===
The following players would have been seeded, but they withdrew from the event.

Rank	Player	Points before	Points defending	Points after	Reason
1	(Spain) Rafael Nadal	9,370	600	8,770	Right Hip Injury
7	(Austria) Dominic Thiem	3,675	10	3,665	Ankle injury
10	(France) Lucas Pouille	2,420	10	2,410	Scheduling
21	(Switzerland) Stan Wawrinka	1,875	90	1,785	Knee Injury
24	(Spain) Albert Ramos Viñolas	1,710	10	1,745†	Scheduling
29	(United Kingdom) Andy Murray	1,450	0	1,450	Hip Injury
31	(Germany) Philipp Kohlschreiber	1,425	45	1,380	Right Foot Injury
38	(France) Jo-Wilfried Tsonga	1,300	0	1,300	Arm injury
40	(Uruguay) Pablo Cuevas	1,220	10	1,210	Personal

† Ramos Viñolas is entitled to use an exemption to skip the tournament and substitute his 18th best result (45 points) in its stead. Accordingly, his points after the tournament will remain unchanged.

=== Other entrants ===
The following players received wildcards into the singles main draw:

- (Cyprus) Marcos Baghdatis
- (United States) Christopher Eubanks
- (Serbia) Miomir Kecmanović
- (Spain) Nicola Kuhn
- (Sweden) Mikael Ymer

The following players received entry using a protected ranking:

- (Japan) Yoshihito Nishioka

The following players received entry from the qualifying draw:

- (Lithuania) Ričardas Berankis
- (India) Yuki Bhambri
- (United Kingdom) Liam Broady
- (Australia) Alex de Minaur
- (Brazil) Rogério Dutra Silva
- (United States) Bjorn Fratangelo
- (France) Calvin Hemery
- (Barbados) Darian King
- (Australia) Thanasi Kokkinakis
- (Australia) John Millman
- (United States) Michael Mmoh
- (United Kingdom) Cameron Norrie

The following player received entry as lucky loser:

- (Bosnia and Herzegovina) Mirza Bašić

=== Withdrawals ===
Before the tournament

- (France) Julien Benneteau → replaced by (Croatia) Ivo Karlović
- (Uruguay) Pablo Cuevas → replaced by (United States) Frances Tiafoe
- (Argentina) Federico Delbonis → replaced by (Bosnia and Herzegovina) Mirza Bašić
- (Ukraine) Alexandr Dolgopolov → replaced by (Moldova) Radu Albot
- (Germany) Philipp Kohlschreiber → replaced by (Slovakia) Lukáš Lacko
- (Italy) Paolo Lorenzi → replaced by (France) Jérémy Chardy
- (Germany) Florian Mayer → replaced by (Canada) Vasek Pospisil
- (France) Gaël Monfils → replaced by (Chile) Nicolás Jarry
- (United Kingdom) Andy Murray (hip surgery) → replaced by (Italy) Thomas Fabbiano
- (Spain) Rafael Nadal (psoas muscle injury) → replaced by (Germany) Maximilian Marterer
- (France) Lucas Pouille → replaced by (Dominican Republic) Víctor Estrella Burgos
- (Spain) Albert Ramos Viñolas → replaced by (Russia) Mikhail Youzhny
- (Italy) Andreas Seppi → replaced by (Argentina) Nicolás Kicker
- (Austria) Dominic Thiem (ankle injury) → replaced by (Romania) Marius Copil
- (France) Jo-Wilfried Tsonga → replaced by (Serbia) Dušan Lajović
- (Switzerland) Stan Wawrinka → replaced by (United States) Taylor Fritz

== ATP doubles main-draw entrants ==
=== Seeds ===
Country	Player	Country	Player	Rank^{1}	Seed
POL	Łukasz Kubot	BRA	Marcelo Melo	2	1
FIN	Henri Kontinen	AUS	John Peers	7	2
AUT	Oliver Marach	CRO	Mate Pavić	11	3
USA	Bob Bryan	USA	Mike Bryan	18	4
NED	Jean-Julien Rojer	ROU	Horia Tecău	23	5
GBR	Jamie Murray	BRA	Bruno Soares	29	6
CRO	Ivan Dodig	USA	Rajeev Ram	35	7
COL	Juan Sebastián Cabal	COL	Robert Farah	40	8

- ^{1} Rankings as of March 19, 2018.

=== Other entrants ===
The following pairs received wildcards into the doubles main draw:

- (Brazil) Marcelo Demoliner / (Canada) Daniel Nestor
- (Australia) Nick Kyrgios / (Australia) Matt Reid

== WTA singles main-draw entrants ==
=== Seeds ===
The following are the seeded players. Seedings are based on WTA rankings as of March 5, 2018. Rankings and points before are as of March 19, 2018.

Seed	Rank	Player	Points before	Points defending	Points won	Points after	Status
1	1	(Romania) Simona Halep	8,290	215	65	8,140	Third round lost to (Poland) Agnieszka Radwańska [30]
2	2	(Denmark) Caroline Wozniacki	7,430	650	10	6,790	Second round lost to (Puerto Rico) Monica Puig
3	3	(Spain) Garbiñe Muguruza	5,970	120	120	5,970	Fourth round lost to (United States) Sloane Stephens [13]
4	4	(Ukraine) Elina Svitolina	5,425	10	215	5,630	Quarterfinals lost to (Latvia) Jeļena Ostapenko [6]
5	6	(Czech Republic) Karolína Plíšková	4,905	390	215	4,730	Quarterfinals lost to (Belarus) Victoria Azarenka [WC]
6	5	(Latvia) Jeļena Ostapenko	4,971	10	650	5,611	Runner-up, lost to (United States) Sloane Stephens [13]
7	7	(France) Caroline Garcia	4,625	10	10	4,625	Second round lost to (United States) Alison Riske [Q]
8	8	(United States) Venus Williams	4,452	390	215	4,277	Quarterfinals lost to (United States) Danielle Collins [Q]
9	9	(Czech Republic) Petra Kvitová	3,151	0	120	3,271	Fourth round lost to (Latvia) Jeļena Ostapenko [6]
10	10	(Germany) Angelique Kerber	3,150	215	215	3,150	Quarterfinals lost to (United States) Sloane Stephens [13]
11	14	(United Kingdom) Johanna Konta	2,875	1,000	120	1,995	Fourth round lost to (United States) Venus Williams [8]
12	13	(Germany) Julia Görges	2,910	65	10	2,855	Second round lost to (Germany) Carina Witthöft
13	12	(United States) Sloane Stephens	2,938	0	1000	3,938	Champion, defeated (Latvia) Jeļena Ostapenko [6]
14	15	(United States) Madison Keys	2,593	65	10	2,538	Second round retired against (Belarus) Victoria Azarenka [WC]
15	19	(France) Kristina Mladenovic	2,280	10	10	2,280	Second round lost to (Croatia) Petra Martić
16	16	(United States) CoCo Vandeweghe	2,488	10	10	2,488	Second round lost to (United States) Danielle Collins [Q]
17	18	(Slovakia) Magdaléna Rybáriková	2,395	(55)^{†}	10	2,350	Second round lost to (Romania) Monica Niculescu [Q]
18	27	(Russia) Svetlana Kuznetsova	1,722	120	10	1,612	Second round lost to (Kazakhstan) Zarina Diyas
19	11	(Russia) Daria Kasatkina	2,940	10	10	2,940	Second round lost to (United States) Sofia Kenin [Q]
20	17	(Latvia) Anastasija Sevastova	2,405	10	65	2,460	Third round lost to (Belarus) Victoria Azarenka [WC]
21	20	(Australia) Ashleigh Barty	2,198	35	120	2,283	Fourth round lost to (Ukraine) Elina Svitolina [4]
22	21	(Belgium) Elise Mertens	2,165	(30)^{†}	65	2,200	Third round lost to (United Kingdom) Johanna Konta [11]
23	25	(Russia) Anastasia Pavlyuchenkova	1,920	65	65	1,920	Third round lost to (Germany) Angelique Kerber [10]
24	43	(Russia) Elena Vesnina	1,175	10	10	1,175	Second round lost to (Croatia) Donna Vekić
25	24	(Czech Republic) Barbora Strýcová	1,925	120	10	1,815	Second round lost to (United States) Christina McHale
26	26	(Australia) Daria Gavrilova	1,870	10	65	1,925	Third round lost to (Ukraine) Elina Svitolina [4]
27	23	(Spain) Carla Suárez Navarro	1,990	10	10	1,990	Second round lost to (China) Wang Yafan [Q]
28	28	(Estonia) Anett Kontaveit	1,710	95	10	1,625	Second round lost to (Greece) Maria Sakkari
29	29	(Netherlands) Kiki Bertens	1,670	10	65	1,725	Third round lost to (United States) Venus Williams [8]
30	32	(Poland) Agnieszka Radwańska	1,470	65	120	1,525	Fourth round lost to (Belarus) Victoria Azarenka [WC]
31	30	(China) Zhang Shuai	1,555	65	10	1,500	Second round lost to (Brazil) Beatriz Haddad Maia
32	33	(Romania) Sorana Cîrstea	1,410	65	10	1,355	Second round lost to (Chinese Taipei) Hsieh Su-wei

† The player did not qualify for the tournament in 2017. Accordingly, points for her 16th best result are deducted instead.

=== Other entrants ===
The following players received wildcards into the singles main draw:

- (United States) Amanda Anisimova
- (Belarus) Victoria Azarenka
- (United States) Claire Liu
- (United States) Bethanie Mattek-Sands
- (United States) Whitney Osuigwe
- (United States) Bernarda Pera
- (Australia) Ajla Tomljanović
- (United States) Serena Williams

The following players received entry from the qualifying draw:

- (United Kingdom) Katie Boulter
- (United States) Danielle Collins
- (Switzerland) Viktorija Golubic
- (Slovenia) Polona Hercog
- (United States) Sofia Kenin
- (Romania) Monica Niculescu
- (Sweden) Rebecca Peterson
- (Germany) Andrea Petkovic
- (United States) Alison Riske
- (Russia) Natalia Vikhlyantseva
- (Switzerland) Stefanie Vögele
- (China) Wang Yafan

The following player received entry as a lucky loser:

- (France) Océane Dodin

=== Withdrawals ===
Before the tournament

- (Switzerland) Belinda Bencic → replaced by (France) Océane Dodin
- (Slovakia) Dominika Cibulková → replaced by (Spain) Lara Arruabarrena
- (Russia) Margarita Gasparyan → replaced by (United States) Madison Brengle
- (Ukraine) Kateryna Kozlova → replaced by (Paraguay) Verónica Cepede Royg
- (Croatia) Ana Konjuh → replaced by (Ukraine) Kateryna Bondarenko
- (Croatia) Mirjana Lučić-Baroni → replaced by (Kazakhstan) Yulia Putintseva
- (China) Peng Shuai → replaced by (Belgium) Alison Van Uytvanck
- (Czech Republic) Lucie Šafářová → replaced by (Sweden) Johanna Larsson
- (Russia) Maria Sharapova → replaced by (United States) Jennifer Brady
- (Germany) Laura Siegemund → replaced by (Czech Republic) Kristýna Plíšková

During the tournament

- (United States) Amanda Anisimova

=== Retirements ===
- (Kazakhstan) Zarina Diyas
- (Estonia) Kaia Kanepi
- (United States) Madison Keys
- (Romania) Monica Niculescu

== WTA doubles main-draw entrants ==
=== Seeds ===
Country	Player	Country	Player	Rank^{1}	Seed
RUS	Ekaterina Makarova	RUS	Elena Vesnina	6	1
TPE	Chan Hao-ching	TPE	Latisha Chan	16	2
CAN	Gabriela Dabrowski	CHN	Xu Yifan	19	3
HUN	Tímea Babos	FRA	Kristina Mladenovic	23	4
CZE	Andrea Sestini Hlaváčková	CZE	Barbora Strýcová	26	5
CZE	Barbora Krejčíková	CZE	Kateřina Siniaková	42	6
NED	Kiki Bertens	SWE	Johanna Larsson	44	7
SLO	Andreja Klepač	ESP	María José Martínez Sánchez	44	8

- ^{1} Rankings as of March 5, 2018.

=== Other entrants ===
The following pairs received wildcards into the doubles main draw:

- (Belarus) Victoria Azarenka / (Belarus) Aryna Sabalenka
- (Canada) Eugenie Bouchard / (United States) Sloane Stephens
- (United Kingdom) Johanna Konta / (United Kingdom) Heather Watson

The following pair received entry as alternates:

- (Germany) Tatjana Maria / (Ukraine) Lesia Tsurenko

=== Withdrawals ===
Before the tournament

- (Australia) Daria Gavrilova / (Australia) Samantha Stosur
