= 2017 Malaysian Open – Singles =

Singles
- 2017 Malaysian Open

Final
- Champion: (Australia) Ashleigh Barty
- Runner-up: (Japan) Nao Hibino
- Score: 6–3, 6–2

Details
- Draw: 32
- Seeds: 8

Events
Singles	Doubles
- Malaysian Open

Elina Svitolina was the defending champion but withdrew before her second round match due to a leg injury.

Ashleigh Barty won her first WTA title, defeating Nao Hibino in the final, 6–3, 6–2.

== Seeds ==
1. (Ukraine) Elina Svitolina (second round, withdrew)
2. (Spain) Carla Suárez Navarro (first round)
3. (France) Caroline Garcia (first round)
4. (China) Peng Shuai (second round, retired)
5. (China) Duan Yingying (quarterfinals)
6. (China) Wang Qiang (quarterfinals)
7. (Belgium) Elise Mertens (first round)
8. (Turkey) Çağla Büyükakçay (first round)

== Draw ==
Key

- Q = Qualifier
- WC = Wild card
- LL = Lucky loser
- Alt = Alternate
- ITF = ITF entry
- PR = Protected ranking
- SR = Special ranking
- SE = Special exempt
- JE = Junior exempt
- JR = Junior Accelerator Programme entrant
- CO = College Accelerator Programme entrant
- NG = Next Gen Accelerator Program entrant
- w/o = Walkover
- r = Retired
- d = Defaulted

=== Finals ===
Semifinals
(Japan) Nao Hibino	2	6	6
(Poland) Magda Linette	6	4	4
(China) Han Xinyun	3	5
Q	(Australia) Ashleigh Barty	6	7

Final
(Japan) Nao Hibino	3	2
Q	(Australia) Ashleigh Barty	6	6

=== Top half ===
First round
1	(Ukraine) E Svitolina	6	6
Q	(South Korea) S-j Jang	2	3
(Japan) N Hibino	7	4	6
(Belgium) M Zanevska	5	6	2
Q	(Uzbekistan) S Sharipova	7	5	6
(Chinese Taipei) S-w Hsieh	5	7	1
Q	(Netherlands) L Kerkhove	6	7^{7}
7	(Belgium) E Mertens	4	6^{4}
4	(China) S Peng	6	6
(Chinese Taipei) K-c Chang	1	4
(Poland) M Linette	6	3	6
WC	(Ukraine) K Zavatska	1	6	3
(Spain) S Soler Espinosa	3	6^{2}
(Spain) S Sorribes Tormo	6	7^{7}
WC	(Kazakhstan) Z Diyas	5	3
5	(China) Y Duan	7	6

Second round
1	(Ukraine) E Svitolina
(Japan) N Hibino	w/o
Q	(Uzbekistan) S Sharipova	4	4
Q	(Netherlands) L Kerkhove	6	6
4	(China) S Peng	2^{r}
(Poland) M Linette	5
(Spain) S Sorribes Tormo	0	6	5
5	(China) Y Duan	6	4	7

Quarterfinals
(Japan) N Hibino	7^{7}	6
Q	(Netherlands) L Kerkhove	6^{4}	3
(Poland) M Linette	7^{7}	4	6
5	(China) Y Duan	6^{3}	6	1

Semifinals
(Japan) N Hibino	2	6	6
(Poland) M Linette	6	4	4

=== Bottom half ===
First round
6	(China) Q Wang	6	6
(Serbia) N Stojanović	1	3
WC	(China) S Zheng	7^{7}	2	6
(China) L Zhu	6^{5}	6	3
(Serbia) A Krunić	5	1
(China) X Han	7	6
Q	(Russia) A Kalinskaya	7	6
3	(France) C Garcia	5	2
8	(Turkey) Ç Büyükakçay	2	6	4
(Japan) R Ozaki	6	3	6
(Ukraine) K Kozlova	6^{8}	2
(China) K Zhang	7^{10}	6
(United States) I Falconi	3	7	0
Q	(Australia) A Barty	6	5	6
Q	(Japan) M Kato	2	6	6
2	(Spain) C Suárez Navarro	6	1	3

Second round
6	(China) Q Wang	6	6
WC	(China) S Zheng	1	1
(China) X Han	6	6
Q	(Russia) A Kalinskaya	3	0
(Japan) R Ozaki	2	4
(China) K Zhang	6	6
Q	(Australia) A Barty	6	6
Q	(Japan) M Kato	0	3

Quarterfinals
6	(China) Q Wang	7^{7}	2	4
(China) X Han	6^{4}	6	6
(China) K Zhang	0	6^{2}
Q	(Australia) A Barty	6	7^{7}

Semifinals
(China) X Han	3	5
Q	(Australia) A Barty	6	7

== Qualifying ==
=== Seeds ===
1. (China) Liu Fangzhou (first round)
2. (Uzbekistan) Sabina Sharipova (qualified)
3. (Belarus) Aryna Sabalenka (first round)
4. (Slovenia) Dalila Jakupović (qualifying competition)
5. (Serbia) Ivana Jorović (first round)
6. (South Korea) Jang Su-jeong (qualified)
7. (Australia) Ashleigh Barty (qualified)
8. (Austria) Barbara Haas (qualifying competition)
9. (Netherlands) Cindy Burger (qualifying competition)
10. (Turkey) İpek Soylu (qualifying competition)
11. (Czech Republic) Tereza Martincová (qualifying competition)
12. (Russia) Anna Kalinskaya (qualified)

=== Qualifiers ===
1. (Netherlands) Lesley Kerkhove
2. (Uzbekistan) Sabina Sharipova
3. (Japan) Miyu Kato
4. (Russia) Anna Kalinskaya
5. (Australia) Ashleigh Barty
6. (South Korea) Jang Su-jeong

=== Draw ===
==== First qualifier ====
First round
1	(China) Liu Fangzhou	6	1	5
(Netherlands) Lesley Kerkhove	4	6	7
(Japan) Shuko Aoyama	2	1
8	(Austria) Barbara Haas	6	6

Qualifying competition
(Netherlands) Lesley Kerkhove	6	6
8	(Austria) Barbara Haas	1	1

==== Second qualifier ====
First round
2	(Uzbekistan) Sabina Sharipova	6	6
WC	(Malaysia) Theiviya Selvarajoo	1	2
WC	(China) Ma Yexin	0	0
9	(Netherlands) Cindy Burger	6	6

Qualifying competition
2	(Uzbekistan) Sabina Sharipova	4	7^{7}	7^{8}
9	(Netherlands) Cindy Burger	6	6^{4}	6^{6}

==== Third qualifier ====
First round
3	(Belarus) Aryna Sabalenka	5	6	6^{5}
(Japan) Miyu Kato	7	2	7^{7}
(Poland) Paula Kania	3	1
10	(Turkey) İpek Soylu	6	6

Qualifying competition
(Japan) Miyu Kato	7	7^{7}
10	(Turkey) İpek Soylu	5	6^{4}

==== Fourth qualifier ====
First round
4	(Slovenia) Dalila Jakupović	6	4	6
(Australia) Lizette Cabrera	3	6	1
(Russia) Ksenia Lykina	1	4
12	(Russia) Anna Kalinskaya	6	6

Qualifying competition
4	(Slovenia) Dalila Jakupović	1	5
12	(Russia) Anna Kalinskaya	6	7

==== Fifth qualifier ====
First round
5	(Serbia) Ivana Jorović	1	6^{3}
(Poland) Urszula Radwańska	6	7^{7}
Alt	(Thailand) Varatchaya Wongteanchai	3	4
7	(Australia) Ashleigh Barty	6	6

Qualifying competition
(Poland) Urszula Radwańska	0	1
7	(Australia) Ashleigh Barty	6	6

==== Sixth qualifier ====
First round
6	(South Korea) Jang Su-jeong	6	6
WC	(Hong Kong) Zhang Ling	3	3
WC	(Malaysia) Jawairiah Noordin	4	1
11	(Czech Republic) Tereza Martincová	6	6

Qualifying competition
6	(South Korea) Jang Su-jeong	6	5	6
11	(Czech Republic) Tereza Martincová	2	7	3
