= 2018 Miami Open – Women's singles =

Women's singles
- 2018 Miami Open

Final
- Champion: (United States) Sloane Stephens
- Runner-up: (Latvia) Jeļena Ostapenko
- Score: 7–6^{(7–5)}, 6–1

Details
- Draw: 96
- Seeds: 32

Events
Singles	men	women
Doubles	men	women
- Miami Open

Sloane Stephens defeated Jeļena Ostapenko in the final, 7–6^{(7–5)}, 6–1 to win the women's singles tennis title at the 2018 Miami Open. It was her sixth career singles title, first Premier Mandatory title, and first title since winning the US Open in September 2017. By virtue of her victory, Stephens made her debut in the top 10, at No. 9.

Johanna Konta was the defending champion, but lost in the fourth round to Venus Williams.

Danielle Collins became the first qualifier in Miami Open history to reach the semifinals.

== Seeds ==
All seeds received a bye into the second round.

1. (Romania) Simona Halep (third round)
2. (Denmark) Caroline Wozniacki (second round)
3. (Spain) Garbiñe Muguruza (fourth round)
4. (Ukraine) Elina Svitolina (quarterfinals)
5. (Czech Republic) Karolína Plíšková (quarterfinals)
6. (Latvia) Jeļena Ostapenko (final)
7. (France) Caroline Garcia (second round)
8. (United States) Venus Williams (quarterfinals)
9. (Czech Republic) Petra Kvitová (fourth round)
10. (Germany) Angelique Kerber (quarterfinals)
11. (United Kingdom) Johanna Konta (fourth round)
12. (Germany) Julia Görges (second round)
13. (United States) Sloane Stephens (champion)
14. (United States) Madison Keys (second round, retired)
15. (France) Kristina Mladenovic (second round)
16. (United States) CoCo Vandeweghe (second round)

17. (Slovakia) Magdaléna Rybáriková (second round)
18. (Russia) Svetlana Kuznetsova (second round)
19. (Russia) Daria Kasatkina (second round)
20. (Latvia) Anastasija Sevastova (third round)
21. (Australia) Ashleigh Barty (fourth round)
22. (Belgium) Elise Mertens (third round)
23. (Russia) Anastasia Pavlyuchenkova (third round)
24. (Russia) Elena Vesnina (second round)
25. (Czech Republic) Barbora Strýcová (second round)
26. (Australia) Daria Gavrilova (third round)
27. (Spain) Carla Suárez Navarro (second round)
28. (Estonia) Anett Kontaveit (second round)
29. (Netherlands) Kiki Bertens (third round)
30. (Poland) Agnieszka Radwańska (fourth round)
31. (China) Zhang Shuai (second round)
32. (Romania) Sorana Cîrstea (second round)

Click on the seed number of a player to go to their draw section.

== Draw ==
Key

- Q = Qualifier
- WC = Wild card
- LL = Lucky loser
- Alt = Alternate
- ITF = ITF entry
- PR = Protected ranking
- SR = Special ranking
- SE = Special exempt
- JE = Junior exempt
- JR = Junior Accelerator Programme entrant
- CO = College Accelerator Programme entrant
- NG = Next Gen Accelerator Program entrant
- w/o = Walkover
- r = Retired
- d = Defaulted

=== Finals ===
Quarterfinals
WC	(Belarus) Victoria Azarenka	7	6
5	(Czech Republic) Karolína Plíšková	5	3
13	(United States) Sloane Stephens	6	6
10	(Germany) Angelique Kerber	1	2
6	(Latvia) Jeļena Ostapenko	7^{7}	7^{7}
4	(Ukraine) Elina Svitolina	6^{3}	6^{5}
8	(United States) Venus Williams	2	3
Q	(United States) Danielle Collins	6	6

Semifinals
WC	(Belarus) Victoria Azarenka	6	2	1
13	(United States) Sloane Stephens	3	6	6
6	(Latvia) Jeļena Ostapenko	7^{7}	6
Q	(United States) Danielle Collins	6^{1}	3

Final
13	(United States) Sloane Stephens	7^{7}	6
6	(Latvia) Jeļena Ostapenko	6^{5}	1

=== Top half ===
==== Section 1 ====
First round
(Paraguay) V Cepede Royg	4	7^{7}	3
LL	(France) O Dodin	6	6^{3}	6
(Ukraine) K Bondarenko	7^{7}	5	1
(Belgium) A Van Uytvanck	6^{3}	7	6
WC	(United States) B Mattek-Sands	2	5
(France) A Cornet	6	7
(United States) C Bellis	3	0
WC	(Belarus) V Azarenka	6	6

Second round
1	(Romania) S Halep	3	6	7
LL	(France) O Dodin	6	3	5
(Belgium) A Van Uytvanck	3	6^{4}
30	(Poland) A Radwańska	6	7^{7}
20	(Latvia) A Sevastova	7	6
(France) A Cornet	5	4
WC	(Belarus) V Azarenka	7^{7}	2
14	(United States) M Keys	6^{5}	0^{r}

Third round
1	(Romania) S Halep	6	2	3
30	(Poland) A Radwańska	3	6	6
20	(Latvia) A Sevastova	6	4	1
WC	(Belarus) V Azarenka	3	6	6

Fourth round
30	(Poland) A Radwańska	2	2
WC	(Belarus) V Azarenka	6	6

==== Section 2 ====
First round
(Germany) T Maria	3	4
(Germany) C Witthöft	6	6
(Kazakhstan) Z Diyas	7	7^{10}
(United States) J Brady	5	6^{8}
Q	(United Kingdom) K Boulter	4	5
(Chinese Taipei) S-w Hsieh	6	7
(Switzerland) T Bacsinszky	2	6	4
(Russia) E Makarova	6	2	6

Second round
12	(Germany) J Görges	6^{2}	6	4
(Germany) C Witthöft	7^{7}	4	6
(Kazakhstan) Z Diyas	6	6
18	(Russia) S Kuznetsova	1	3
32	(Romania) S Cîrstea	5	2
(Chinese Taipei) S-w Hsieh	7	6
(Russia) E Makarova	5	5
5	(Czech Republic) Ka Plíšková	7	7

Third round
(Germany) C Witthöft	6	5	0
(Kazakhstan) Z Diyas	4	7	6
(Chinese Taipei) S-w Hsieh	4	6	6^{4}
5	(Czech Republic) Ka Plíšková	6	1	7^{7}

Fourth round
(Kazakhstan) Z Diyas	2	1^{r}
5	(Czech Republic) Ka Plíšková	6	2

==== Section 3 ====
First round
WC	(United States) A Anisimova	6	1	6
(China) Q Wang	3	6	2
(United States) C McHale	1
(Estonia) K Kanepi	3^{r}
Q	(Romania) M Niculescu	6	6
(Kazakhstan) Y Putintseva	2	4
(Ukraine) L Tsurenko	6	4	5
WC	(Australia) A Tomljanović	3	6	7

Second round
3	(Spain) G Muguruza	w/o
WC	(United States) A Anisimova
(United States) C McHale	6	6
25	(Czech Republic) B Strýcová	1	4
17	(Slovakia) M Rybáriková	3	3
Q	(Romania) M Niculescu	6	6
WC	(Australia) A Tomljanović	1	3
13	(United States) S Stephens	6	6

Third round
3	(Spain) G Muguruza	6	6
(United States) C McHale	2	1
Q	(Romania) M Niculescu	7^{7}	3	0^{r}
13	(United States) S Stephens	6^{1}	6	4

Fourth round
3	(Spain) G Muguruza	3	4
13	(United States) S Stephens	6	6

==== Section 4 ====
First round
(Sweden) J Larsson	4	7^{7}	7
(Czech Republic) K Siniaková	6	6^{5}	5
(Belarus) A Sasnovich	1	7^{7}	7
(Czech Republic) Kr Plíšková	6	6^{5}	5
Q	(China) Y Wang	6	4	7^{7}
(Czech Republic) M Vondroušová	2	6	6^{0}
(Poland) M Linette	6	0	2
Q	(United States) A Riske	1	6	6

Second round
10	(Germany) A Kerber	6	6
(Sweden) J Larsson	2	2
(Belarus) A Sasnovich	2	6	2
23	(Russia) A Pavlyuchenkova	6	3	6
27	(Spain) C Suárez Navarro	5	3
Q	(China) Y Wang	7	6
Q	(United States) A Riske	6	6
7	(France) C Garcia	3	1

Third round
10	(Germany) A Kerber	6	6
23	(Russia) A Pavlyuchenkova	4	4
Q	(China) Y Wang	4	6	7^{7}
Q	(United States) A Riske	6	3	6^{4}

Fourth round
10	(Germany) A Kerber	6^{1}	7^{7}	6
Q	(China) Y Wang	7^{7}	6^{5}	3

=== Bottom half ===
==== Section 5 ====
First round
(Germany) M Barthel	6^{5}	3
(Hungary) T Babos	7^{7}	6
(Brazil) B Haddad Maia	7^{7}	6
(United Kingdom) H Watson	6^{3}	2
Q	(Switzerland) S Vögele	4	4
Q	(United States) S Kenin	6	6
(United States) M Brengle	1	4
(Belarus) A Sabalenka	6	6

Second round
6	(Latvia) J Ostapenko	6	6
(Hungary) T Babos	4	4
(Brazil) B Haddad Maia	6	6
31	(China) S Zhang	3	2
19	(Russia) D Kasatkina	6	2	2
Q	(United States) S Kenin	3	6	6
(Belarus) A Sabalenka	5	6	3
9	(Czech Republic) P Kvitová	7	3	6

Third round
6	(Latvia) J Ostapenko	6	7^{7}
(Brazil) B Haddad Maia	2	6^{2}
Q	(United States) S Kenin	6	2	4
9	(Czech Republic) P Kvitová	3	6	6

Fourth round
6	(Latvia) J Ostapenko	7^{7}	6
9	(Czech Republic) P Kvitová	6^{4}	3

==== Section 6 ====
First round
(United States) L Davis	1	5
(Croatia) P Martić	6	7
WC	(United States) C Liu	6	6
WC	(United States) W Osuigwe	3	1
Q	(Germany) A Petkovic	6	6
Q	(Slovenia) P Hercog	2	0
WC	(United States) S Williams	3	2
(Japan) N Osaka	6	6

Second round
15	(France) K Mladenovic	6	4	2
(Croatia) P Martić	3	6	6
WC	(United States) C Liu	0	6^{0}
21	(Australia) A Barty	6	7^{7}
26	(Australia) D Gavrilova	7^{7}	6
Q	(Germany) A Petkovic	6^{3}	4
(Japan) N Osaka	4	2
4	(Ukraine) E Svitolina	6	6

Third round
(Croatia) P Martić	4	3
21	(Australia) A Barty	6	6
26	(Australia) D Gavrilova	6	0	1
4	(Ukraine) E Svitolina	4	6	6

Fourth round
21	(Australia) A Barty	5	4
4	(Ukraine) E Svitolina	7	6

==== Section 7 ====
First round
Q	(Russia) N Vikhlyantseva	7	6
Q	(Sweden) R Peterson	5	1
(United States) V Lepchenko	6	5	7
Q	(Switzerland) V Golubic	4	7	5
WC	(United States) B Pera	7	6
(Spain) L Arruabarrena	5	4
(Belgium) K Flipkens	6	6
(Romania) M Buzărnescu	2	3

Second round
8	(United States) V Williams	7	6
Q	(Russia) N Vikhlyantseva	5	4
(United States) V Lepchenko	7	6^{5}	1
29	(Netherlands) K Bertens	5	7^{7}	6
22	(Belgium) E Mertens	7^{7}	6
WC	(United States) B Pera	6^{5}	3
(Belgium) K Flipkens	4	3
11	(United Kingdom) J Konta	6	6

Third round
8	(United States) V Williams	5	6	7
29	(Netherlands) K Bertens	7	3	5
22	(Belgium) E Mertens	2	1
11	(United Kingdom) J Konta	6	6

Fourth round
8	(United States) V Williams	5	6	6
11	(United Kingdom) J Konta	7	1	2

==== Section 8 ====
First round
Q	(United States) D Collins	6	6
(Romania) I-C Begu	1	1
(Italy) C Giorgi	0	5
(Croatia) D Vekić	6	7
(Serbia) A Krunić	5	1
(Greece) M Sakkari	7	6
(Puerto Rico) M Puig	6	6
(Australia) S Stosur	3	4

Second round
16	(United States) C Vandeweghe	3	6	1
Q	(United States) D Collins	6	1	6
(Croatia) D Vekić	6	6^{4}	6
24	(Russia) E Vesnina	3	7^{7}	1
28	(Estonia) A Kontaveit	4	1
(Greece) M Sakkari	6	6
(Puerto Rico) M Puig	0	6	6
2	(Denmark) C Wozniacki	6	4	4

Third round
Q	(United States) D Collins	4	6	6
(Croatia) D Vekić	6	2	1
(Greece) M Sakkari	3	5
(Puerto Rico) M Puig	6	7

Fourth round
Q	(United States) D Collins	3	6	6
(Puerto Rico) M Puig	6	4	2

== Qualifying ==
=== Seeds ===
1. (Romania) Monica Niculescu (qualified)
2. (Slovenia) Polona Hercog (qualified)
3. (Russia) Natalia Vikhlyantseva (qualified)
4. (Italy) Sara Errani (first round)
5. (France) Pauline Parmentier (first round)
6. (China) Duan Yingying (first round, retired)
7. (France) Océane Dodin (qualifying competition, retired, lucky loser)
8. (Japan) Kurumi Nara (first round)
9. (Slovakia) Jana Čepelová (qualifying competition)
10. (United States) Sachia Vickery (first round)
11. (United States) Taylor Townsend (first round)
12. (United States) Sofia Kenin (qualified)
13. (Germany) Andrea Petkovic (qualified)
14. (United States) Alison Riske (qualified)
15. (Switzerland) Viktorija Golubic (qualified)
16. (United States) Kristie Ahn (first round)
17. (Spain) Sara Sorribes Tormo (first round)
18. (Russia) Evgeniya Rodina (first round)
19. (Croatia) Jana Fett (first round, retired)
20. (Colombia) Mariana Duque Mariño (first round)
21. (Belgium) Yanina Wickmayer (qualifying competition)
22. (Canada) Eugenie Bouchard (qualifying competition)
23. (United States) Danielle Collins (qualified)
24. (United States) Nicole Gibbs (qualifying competition)

=== Qualifiers ===
1. (Romania) Monica Niculescu
2. (Slovenia) Polona Hercog
3. (Russia) Natalia Vikhlyantseva
4. (Switzerland) Stefanie Vögele
5. (Sweden) Rebecca Peterson
6. (China) Wang Yafan
7. (United States) Alison Riske
8. (Germany) Andrea Petkovic
9. (United States) Danielle Collins
10. (Switzerland) Viktorija Golubic
11. (United Kingdom) Katie Boulter
12. (United States) Sofia Kenin

=== Lucky loser ===
1. (France) Océane Dodin

=== Qualifying draw ===
==== First qualifier ====
First round
1	(Romania) Monica Niculescu	6	6
(Germany) Antonia Lottner	4	0
(Australia) Olivia Rogowska	4	7^{7}	4
21	(Belgium) Yanina Wickmayer	6	6^{3}	6

Qualifying competition
1	(Romania) Monica Niculescu	6	6
21	(Belgium) Yanina Wickmayer	1	3

==== Second qualifier ====
First round
2	(Slovenia) Polona Hercog	6	6
WC	(China) Wang Xiyu	4	2
(Czech Republic) Barbora Krejčíková	4	7	3
19	(Croatia) Jana Fett	6	5	1^{r}

Qualifying competition
2	(Slovenia) Polona Hercog	6	6
(Czech Republic) Barbora Krejčíková	4	2

==== Third qualifier ====
First round
3	(Russia) Natalia Vikhlyantseva	6	6
WC	(Colombia) Emiliana Arango	3	2
(Russia) Sofya Zhuk	2	0
24	(United States) Nicole Gibbs	6	6

Qualifying competition
3	(Russia) Natalia Vikhlyantseva	7^{7}	6
24	(United States) Nicole Gibbs	6^{3}	4

==== Fourth qualifier ====
First round
4	(Italy) Sara Errani	4	7	6^{2}
(Czech Republic) Tereza Martincová	6	5	7^{7}
PR	(Switzerland) Stefanie Vögele	7	6
16	(United States) Kristie Ahn	5	2

Qualifying competition
(Czech Republic) Tereza Martincová	5	2
PR	(Switzerland) Stefanie Vögele	7	6

==== Fifth qualifier ====
First round
5	(France) Pauline Parmentier	0	3
(Sweden) Rebecca Peterson	6	6
WC	(United States) Allie Kiick	2	2
22	(Canada) Eugenie Bouchard	6	6

Qualifying competition
(Sweden) Rebecca Peterson	6	6
22	(Canada) Eugenie Bouchard	4	3

==== Sixth qualifier ====
First round
6	(China) Duan Yingying	6^{4}	2^{r}
(China) Wang Yafan	7^{7}	5
(Canada) Françoise Abanda	6	6
18	(Russia) Evgeniya Rodina	4	3

Qualifying competition
(China) Wang Yafan	6	6
(Canada) Françoise Abanda	4	3

==== Seventh qualifier ====
First round
7	(France) Océane Dodin	4	7	6
(United Kingdom) Naomi Broady	6	5	3
(Tunisia) Ons Jabeur	5	1
14	(United States) Alison Riske	7	6

Qualifying competition
7	(France) Océane Dodin	1	0^{r}
14	(United States) Alison Riske	6	0

==== Eighth qualifier ====
First round
8	(Japan) Kurumi Nara	7^{7}	4	3
(Belarus) Vera Lapko	6^{3}	6	6
PR	(Germany) Sabine Lisicki	6	3	1^{r}
13	(Germany) Andrea Petkovic	4	6	3

Qualifying competition
(Belarus) Vera Lapko	6^{1}	2
13	(Germany) Andrea Petkovic	7^{7}	6

==== Ninth qualifier ====
First round
9	(Slovakia) Jana Čepelová	6	7
(Bulgaria) Viktoriya Tomova	4	5
WC	(Czech Republic) Tereza Smitková	2	4
23	(United States) Danielle Collins	6	6

Qualifying competition
9	(Slovakia) Jana Čepelová	6^{3}	4
23	(United States) Danielle Collins	7^{7}	6

==== Tenth qualifier ====
First round
10	(United States) Sachia Vickery	7	1	2
(Italy) Roberta Vinci	5	6	6
(Australia) Arina Rodionova	3	3
15	(Switzerland) Viktorija Golubic	6	6

Qualifying competition
(Italy) Roberta Vinci	4	3
15	(Switzerland) Viktorija Golubic	6	6

==== Eleventh qualifier ====
First round
11	(United States) Taylor Townsend	6^{1}	2
WC	(United Kingdom) Katie Boulter	7^{7}	6
(Canada) Carol Zhao	6	6
17	(Spain) Sara Sorribes Tormo	2	2

Qualifying competition
WC	(United Kingdom) Katie Boulter	3	7^{7}	6
(Canada) Carol Zhao	6	6^{1}	2

==== Twelfth qualifier ====
First round
12	(United States) Sofia Kenin	6	7
WC	(United States) Ann Li	2	5
(Belgium) Ysaline Bonaventure	6	6
20	(Colombia) Mariana Duque Mariño	3	2

Qualifying competition
12	(United States) Sofia Kenin	3	6	6
(Belgium) Ysaline Bonaventure	6	4	3
