= 2017 Malaysian Open – Doubles =

Doubles
- 2017 Malaysian Open

Final
- Champions: (Australia) Ashleigh Barty (Australia) Casey Dellacqua
- Runners-up: (United States) Nicole Melichar (Japan) Makoto Ninomiya
- Score: 7–6^{(7–5)}, 6–3

Details
- Draw: 16
- Seeds: 4

Events
Singles	Doubles
← 2016 ·	Malaysian Open

Varatchaya Wongteanchai and Yang Zhaoxuan were the defending champions, but chose not to participate together. Wongteanchai played alongside Nao Hibino, but lost in the quarterfinals to Ashleigh Barty and Casey Dellacqua. Yang teamed up with Shuko Aoyama, but lost in the quarterfinals to Elise Mertens and İpek Soylu.

Barty and Dellacqua went on to win the title, defeating Nicole Melichar and Makoto Ninomiya in the final, 7–6^{(7–5)}, 6–3.

== Seeds ==
1. (China) Liang Chen / (China) Zheng Saisai (first round)
2. (Japan) Shuko Aoyama / (China) Yang Zhaoxuan (quarterfinals)
3. (Argentina) María Irigoyen / (Poland) Paula Kania (first round)
4. (United States) Nicole Melichar / (Japan) Makoto Ninomiya (final)

== Draw ==
=== Key ===
- Q = Qualifier
- WC = Wild card
- LL = Lucky loser
- Alt = Alternate
- SE = Special exempt
- PR = Protected ranking
- ITF = ITF entry
- JE = Junior exempt
- w/o = Walkover
- r = Retired
- d = Defaulted
- SR = Special ranking

First round
1	(China) C Liang (China) S Zheng	3	2
(Russia) N Dzalamidze (Russia) V Kudermetova	6	6
(Japan) M Kato (China) K Zhang	6	3	[8]
(Georgia (country)) O Kalashnikova (Kazakhstan) G Voskoboeva	2	6	[10]
4	(United States) N Melichar (Japan) M Ninomiya	6	6
(Serbia) A Krunić (Serbia) N Stojanović	1	4
(China) Y Duan (China) X Han	6	6
(Chinese Taipei) K-c Chang (China) Q Wang	3	4
(Japan) N Hibino (Thailand) V Wongteanchai	1	6	[10]
(Ukraine) L Kichenok (Ukraine) N Kichenok	6	1	[7]
(Australia) A Barty (Australia) C Dellacqua	6	6
3	(Argentina) M Irigoyen (Poland) P Kania	4	1
WC	(Malaysia) J Noordin (Indonesia) J Rompies	0	4
(Belgium) E Mertens (Turkey) İ Soylu	6	6
WC	(Indonesia) B Gumulya (Malaysia) T Selvarajoo	3	4
2	(Japan) S Aoyama (China) Z Yang	6	6

Quarterfinals
(Russia) N Dzalamidze (Russia) V Kudermetova	7^{7}	6
(Georgia (country)) O Kalashnikova (Kazakhstan) G Voskoboeva	6^{5}	3
4	(United States) N Melichar (Japan) M Ninomiya	6	4	[13]
(China) Y Duan (China) X Han	3	6	[11]
(Japan) N Hibino (Thailand) V Wongteanchai	4	0
(Australia) A Barty (Australia) C Dellacqua	6	6
(Belgium) E Mertens (Turkey) İ Soylu	6	3	[10]
2	(Japan) S Aoyama (China) Z Yang	2	6	[5]

Semifinals
(Russia) N Dzalamidze (Russia) V Kudermetova	6	6^{2}	[7]
4	(United States) N Melichar (Japan) M Ninomiya	4	7^{7}	[10]
(Australia) A Barty (Australia) C Dellacqua	6	6
(Belgium) E Mertens (Turkey) İ Soylu	3	2

Final
4	(United States) N Melichar (Japan) M Ninomiya	6^{5}	3
(Australia) A Barty (Australia) C Dellacqua	7^{7}	6
