= 2018 Miami Open – Women's doubles =

Women's doubles
- 2018 Miami Open

Final
- Champions: (Australia) Ashleigh Barty (United States) CoCo Vandeweghe
- Runners-up: (Czech Republic) Barbora Krejčíková (Czech Republic) Kateřina Siniaková
- Score: 6–2, 6–1

Events
Singles	men	women
Doubles	men	women
← 2017 ·	Miami Open	· 2019 →

Ashleigh Barty and CoCo Vandeweghe defeated Barbora Krejčíková and Kateřina Siniaková in the final, 6–2, 6–1 to win the women's doubles tennis title at the 2018 Miami Open.

Gabriela Dabrowski and Xu Yifan were the defending champions, but lost in the first round to Elise Mertens and Demi Schuurs.

== Seeds ==
1. (Russia) Ekaterina Makarova / (Russia) Elena Vesnina (semifinals)
2. (Chinese Taipei) Chan Hao-ching / (Chinese Taipei) Latisha Chan (quarterfinals)
3. (Canada) Gabriela Dabrowski / (China) Xu Yifan (first round)
4. (Hungary) Tímea Babos / (France) Kristina Mladenovic (first round)
5. (Czech Republic) Andrea Sestini Hlaváčková / (Czech Republic) Barbora Strýcová (first round)
6. (Czech Republic) Barbora Krejčíková / (Czech Republic) Kateřina Siniaková (final)
7. (Netherlands) Kiki Bertens / (Sweden) Johanna Larsson (first round)
8. (Slovenia) Andreja Klepač / (Spain) María José Martínez Sánchez (second round)

== Draw ==
=== Key ===
- Q = Qualifier
- WC = Wild card
- LL = Lucky loser
- Alt = Alternate
- SE = Special exempt
- PR = Protected ranking
- ITF = ITF entry
- JE = Junior exempt
- w/o = Walkover
- r = Retired
- d = Defaulted
- SR = Special ranking

=== Finals ===
Semifinals
1	(Russia) Ekaterina Makarova (Russia) Elena Vesnina	6	2	[7]
(Australia) Ashleigh Barty (United States) CoCo Vandeweghe	3	6	[10]
(Belgium) Elise Mertens (Netherlands) Demi Schuurs	6	3	[9]
6	(Czech Republic) Barbora Krejčíková (Czech Republic) Kateřina Siniaková	4	6	[11]

Final
(Australia) Ashleigh Barty (United States) CoCo Vandeweghe	6	6
6	(Czech Republic) Barbora Krejčíková (Czech Republic) Kateřina Siniaková	2	1

=== Top half ===
First round
1	(Russia) E Makarova (Russia) E Vesnina	4	6	[10]
WC	(Canada) E Bouchard (United States) S Stephens	6	4	[6]
WC	(United Kingdom) J Konta (United Kingdom) H Watson	6	4	[10]
(United States) N Melichar (Czech Republic) K Peschke	2	6	[3]
(Ukraine) L Kichenok (Russia) A Kudryavtseva	6	6
(Belgium) K Flipkens (Serbia) N Stojanović	4	4
(Australia) M Adamczak (Croatia) D Jurak	2	4
8	(Slovenia) A Klepač (Spain) MJ Martínez Sánchez	6	6
4	(Hungary) T Babos (France) K Mladenovic	6	2	[4]
(Australia) A Barty (United States) C Vandeweghe	3	6	[10]
(United States) V King (Slovenia) K Srebotnik	6	6
(Romania) R Olaru (Ukraine) O Savchuk	1	1
(Japan) S Aoyama (China) Z Yang	6	6
(United Kingdom) A Smith (Czech Republic) R Voráčová	1	1
(Ukraine) N Kichenok (Australia) An Rodionova	7^{7}	7
7	(Netherlands) K Bertens (Sweden) J Larsson	6^{2}	5

Second round
1	(Russia) E Makarova (Russia) E Vesnina	7	6
WC	(United Kingdom) J Konta (United Kingdom) H Watson	5	4
(Ukraine) L Kichenok (Russia) A Kudryavtseva	6	7
8	(Slovenia) A Klepač (Spain) MJ Martínez Sánchez	4	5
(Australia) A Barty (United States) C Vandeweghe	6	6
(United States) V King (Slovenia) K Srebotnik	1	3
(Japan) S Aoyama (China) Z Yang	2	3
(Ukraine) N Kichenok (Australia) An Rodionova	6	6

Quarterfinals
1	(Russia) E Makarova (Russia) E Vesnina	6	6
(Ukraine) L Kichenok (Russia) A Kudryavtseva	2	4
(Australia) A Barty (United States) C Vandeweghe	7^{7}	6
(Ukraine) N Kichenok (Australia) An Rodionova	6^{5}	2

Semifinals
1	(Russia) E Makarova (Russia) E Vesnina	6	2	[7]
(Australia) A Barty (United States) C Vandeweghe	3	6	[10]

=== Bottom half ===
First round
5	(Czech Republic) A Sestini Hlaváčková (Czech Republic) B Strýcová	6^{7}	6^{0}
(United States) R Atawo (Germany) A-L Grönefeld	7^{9}	7^{7}
(Romania) I-C Begu (Romania) S Halep	7^{7}	7^{8}
(Germany) J Görges (United States) B Mattek-Sands	6^{3}	6^{6}
WC	(Belarus) V Azarenka (Belarus) A Sabalenka	6	2	[4]
Alt	(Germany) T Maria (Ukraine) L Tsurenko	3	6	[10]
(Belgium) E Mertens (Netherlands) D Schuurs	7	7
3	(Canada) G Dabrowski (China) Y Xu	5	5
6	(Czech Republic) B Krejčíková (Czech Republic) K Siniaková	6	6
(Russia) D Kasatkina (Russia) A Pavlyuchenkova	3	3
(Poland) A Rosolska (United States) A Spears	6^{5}	6^{5}
(Spain) L Arruabarrena (Spain) A Parra Santonja	7^{7}	7^{7}
(Chinese Taipei) S-w Hsieh (Romania) M Niculescu	5	2
(Ukraine) K Bondarenko (Serbia) A Krunić	7	6
(Latvia) J Ostapenko (Latvia) A Sevastova	1	4
2	(Chinese Taipei) H-c Chan (Chinese Taipei) L Chan	6	6

Second round
(United States) R Atawo (Germany) A-L Grönefeld	6^{3}	6	[10]
(Romania) I-C Begu (Romania) S Halep	7^{7}	2	[8]
Alt	(Germany) T Maria (Ukraine) L Tsurenko	4	2
(Belgium) E Mertens (Netherlands) D Schuurs	6	6
6	(Czech Republic) B Krejčíková (Czech Republic) K Siniaková	7^{7}	3	[10]
(Spain) L Arruabarrena (Spain) A Parra Santonja	6^{5}	6	[7]
(Ukraine) K Bondarenko (Serbia) A Krunić	3	6	[7]
2	(Chinese Taipei) H-c Chan (Chinese Taipei) L Chan	6	1	[10]

Quarterfinals
(United States) R Atawo (Germany) A-L Grönefeld	3	6^{5}
(Belgium) E Mertens (Netherlands) D Schuurs	6	7^{7}
6	(Czech Republic) B Krejčíková (Czech Republic) K Siniaková	2	6	[13]
2	(Chinese Taipei) H-c Chan (Chinese Taipei) L Chan	6	4	[11]

Semifinals
(Belgium) E Mertens (Netherlands) D Schuurs	6	3	[9]
6	(Czech Republic) B Krejčíková (Czech Republic) K Siniaková	4	6	[11]
