= 2020 Volvo Car Open =

2020 Credit One Bank Invitational
- Category: Exhibition
- Draw: 16 player team exhibition
- Surface: Green clay
- Location: Charleston, United States
- Venue: Family Circle Tennis Center

Champions
- Team Mattek-Sands 26 – 22 Team Keys
← 2019 ·	Charleston Open	· 2021 →

The 2020 Credit One Bank Invitational was a women's tennis event on the 2020 WTA Tour. Originally scheduled as the Volvo Cars Open between April 6 – 12, 2020, the COVID-19 pandemic forced a postponement and a change to the event by Charleston Tennis, which owns the event.

== History ==
On May 22, 2020, Ben Navarro, the organiser of the Charleston Open and the Founder and CEO of Beemok Capital, announced the reformatted event. Credit One Bank sponsored the event, billed as the return of top-level women's tennis to competitive play in the United States. This improvised edition of the tournament was reformatted as a 16-player women's tennis all-star tournament using Laver Cup rules. The event was held behind closed doors, with prize money and the benefactor being the Medical University of South Carolina. It was held at the Family Circle Tennis Center, on Daniel Island, Charleston, United States, as a clay court tournament held on green clay. It took place from June 23 until June 28, 2020.

Madison Keys and Bethanie Mattek-Sands were captains of the 16-player event featuring Sofia Kenin, Sloane Stephens, Victoria Azarenka, Amanda Anisimova, Monica Puig, Ajla Tomljanović, Danielle Collins, Alison Riske, Shelby Rogers, Genie Bouchard, Jennifer Brady, Leylah Fernandez, Emma Navarro and Caroline Dolehide. There were 24 matches in total with 16 singles and eight doubles matches.

The tournament counted towards Universal Tennis Rating points. Each match was worth points depending on the day of the event, with only singles matches on the first day and only doubles matches on the final day. A team needed 25 of a possible 48 points to win the event.

All matches were two-set matches. If the match was tied after two sets, a ten-point tiebreaker was played.

The team led by Bethanie Mattek-Sands, Team Peace, won the event, 26–22. Jennifer Brady had the best performance of the tournament, going 4–0 in her four matches, the only undefeated player.

== Teams ==
Team Kindness	Team Peace
(United States) **Madison Keys**	(United States) **Bethanie Mattek-Sands**
(Belarus) Victoria Azarenka	(United States) Sofia Kenin
(United States) Sloane Stephens	(United States) Jennifer Brady
(United States) Amanda Anisimova	(Canada) Eugenie Bouchard
(United States) Alison Riske	(United States) Caroline Dolehide
(United States) Shelby Rogers	(United States) Danielle Collins
(Canada) Leylah Fernandez	(United States) Emma Navarro
(Puerto Rico) Monica Puig	(Australia) Ajla Tomljanović

Captains listed in bold.

== Schedule ==
Date	Match Type	Team Kindness	Team Peace	Result	Score
Monday, June 22	Team Draft				
Tuesday, June 23	Singles	(United States) Alison Riske	(United States) **Sofia Kenin**	1–6, 1–6	0–**1**
Tuesday, June 23	Singles	(Canada) **Leylah Fernandez**	(United States) Emma Navarro	6–4, 6–0	**1**–1
Wednesday, June 24	Singles				
Wednesday, June 24	Singles	(United States) **Amanda Anisimova**	(United States) Danielle Collins	7–5, 6–4	**2**–1
Wednesday, June 24	Singles	(United States) Shelby Rogers	(Australia) **Ajla Tomljanović**	1–6, 2–6	2–**2**
Wednesday, June 24	Singles	(Puerto Rico) Monica Puig	(United States) **Bethanie Mattek-Sands**	1–6, 3–6	2–**3**
Thursday, June 25
Thursday, June 25	Singles	(Belarus) Victoria Azarenka	(United States) **Jennifer Brady**	3–6, 2–6	2–**4**
Thursday, June 25	Doubles	(United States) **Sloane Stephens** (United States) **Amanda Anisimova**	(United States) Danielle Collins (Canada) Eugenie Bouchard	4–6, 6–7 (5–7), 7–10	3–**4**
Thursday, June 25	Singles	(United States) **Madison Keys**	(United States) Caroline Dolehide	6–1, 6–7 (6–8), 10–4	**4**–4
Thursday, June 25	Singles	(United States) **Alison Riske**	(United States) Emma Navarro	7–6 (7–5), 4–6, 10–7	**6**–4
Thursday, June 25	Singles	(Canada) Leylah Fernandez	(Canada) **Eugenie Bouchard**	4–6, 3–6	6–**6**
Friday, June 26
Friday, June 26	Doubles	(United States) Madison Keys (Belarus) Victoria Azarenka	(United States) **Bethanie Mattek-Sands** (United States) **Sofia Kenin**	2–6, 6–1, 7–10	6–**8**
Friday, June 26	Singles	(Puerto Rico) Monica Puig	(Australia) **Ajla Tomljanović**	5–7, 2–6	6–**10**
Friday, June 26	Singles	(United States) **Amanda Anisimova**	(United States) Caroline Dolehide	5–7, 7–5, 10–2	**8**–10
Friday, June 26	Doubles	(United States) Shelby Rogers (United States) Alison Riske	(United States) **Emma Navarro** **(United States) Jennifer Brady**	2–6, 3–6	8–**12**
Friday, June 26	Singles	(Belarus) Victoria Azarenka	(United States) **Danielle Collins**	1–6, 5–7	8–**14**
Friday, June 26	Singles	(United States) **Sloane Stephens**	(Canada) Eugenie Bouchard	6–3, 7–6 (9–7)	**10**–14
Saturday, June 27	Singles	(United States) **Madison Keys**	(United States) Sofia Kenin	6–3, 5–7, 10–2	**13**–14
Saturday, June 27	Doubles	(Canada) Leylah Fernandez (Puerto Rico) Monica Puig	(Australia) **Ajla Tomljanović** (United States) **Caroline Dolehide**	6–7 (5–7), 6–7 (2–7)	13–**17**
Saturday, June 27	Singles	(United States) Sloane Stephens	(United States) **Jennifer Brady**	2–6, 6–7 (4–7)	13–**20**
Sunday, June 28	Singles				
Sunday, June 28	Singles	(United States) **Shelby Rogers**	(United States) Bethanie Mattek-Sands	7–5, 7–5	**16**–20
Sunday, June 28	Doubles	(United States) Madison Keys (United States) Alison Riske	(United States) **Jennifer Brady** (Canada) **Eugenie Bouchard**	3–6, 2–6	16–**23**
Sunday, June 28	Doubles	(Belarus) Victoria Azarenka (United States) Amanda Anisimova	(United States) **Bethanie Mattek-Sands** (United States) **Sofia Kenin**	3–6, 4–6	16–**26**
Sunday, June 28	Doubles	(United States) **Sloane Stephens** (United States) **Shelby Rogers**	(Australia) Ajla Tomljanović (United States) Caroline Dolehide	7–5, 6–3	**19**–26
Sunday, June 28	Doubles	(Canada) **Leylah Fernandez** (Puerto Rico) **Monica Puig**	(United States) Danielle Collins (United States) Emma Navarro	2–6, 6–4, 11–9	**22**–26

NOTE: The first two matches on Wednesday were "Day One" matches. For purposes of this tournament, Days One and Two are one-point matches, Days Three and Four are two-point matches, and Days Five and Six are three-point matches.
