= 2016 Volvo Car Open =

- Date: April 4–10
- Edition: 44th
- Category: WTA Premier
- Draw: 56S / 16D
- Prize money: $753,000
- Surface: Clay / outdoor
- Location: Charleston, United States
- Venue: Family Circle Tennis Center

Champions

Singles
- (United States) Sloane Stephens

Doubles
- (France) Caroline Garcia / (France) Kristina Mladenovic
| ← 2015 · | Charleston Open | · 2017 → |

The 2016 Volvo Car Open was a women's tennis event on the 2016 WTA Tour. It took place between April 4 – 10, 2016. It was the 44th edition of the Charleston Open tournament and a WTA Premier tournaments tournament. The event was hosted at the Family Circle Tennis Center, on Daniel Island, Charleston, United States. It was the only event of the clay court season played on green clay.

Sloane Stephens won the singles event while Caroline Garcia and Kristina Mladenovic captured the doubles crown.

== Finals ==
=== Singles ===
(United States) Sloane Stephens defeated (Russia) Elena Vesnina 7–6^{(7–4)}, 6–2

- It was Stephens' 3rd and last singles title of the year and the 4th of her career.

=== Doubles ===
(France) Caroline Garcia / (France) Kristina Mladenovic defeated (United States) Bethanie Mattek-Sands / (Czech Republic) Lucie Šafářová, 6–2, 7–5

== Points and prize money ==
=== Point distribution ===
| Event | W | F | SF | QF | Round of 16 | Round of 32 | Round of 64 | Q | Q2 | Q1 |
| Singles | 470 | 305 | 185 | 100 | 55 | 30 | 1 | 25 | 13 | 1 |
| Doubles | 470 | 305 | 185 | 100 | 1 | — | — | — | — | — |

=== Prize money ===
| Event | W | F | SF | QF | Round of 16 | Round of 32 | Round of 64 | Q2 | Q1 |
| Singles | $128,100 | $68,180 | $33,600 | $17,280 | $8,955 | $4,585 | $2,355 | $1,070 | $640 |
| Doubles | $40,300 | $21,340 | $11,740 | $5,975 | $3,245 | — | — | — | — |

== Singles main draw entrants ==
=== Seeds ===
| Country | Player | Ranking^{1} | Seed |
|---|---|---|---|
| GER | Angelique Kerber | 3 | 1 |
| SUI | Belinda Bencic | 10 | 2 |
| USA | Venus Williams | 14 | 3 |
| CZE | Lucie Šafářová | 15 | 4 |
| ITA | Sara Errani | 18 | 5 |
| GER | Andrea Petkovic | 21 | 6 |
| USA | Sloane Stephens | 22 | 7 |
| USA | Madison Keys | 24 | 8 |
| ~~SRB~~ | ~~Jelena Janković~~ | ~~26~~ | ~~9~~ |
| AUS | Samantha Stosur | 27 | 10 |
| FRA | Kristina Mladenovic | 29 | 11 |
| AUS | Daria Gavrilova | 34 | 12 |
| ROU | Irina-Camelia Begu | 35 | 13 |
| RUS | Daria Kasatkina | 36 | 14 |
| GER | Sabine Lisicki | 37 | 15 |
| JPN | Misaki Doi | 44 | 16 |
| CAN | Eugenie Bouchard | 45 | 17 |

- ^{1} Rankings as of March 21, 2016.

=== Other entrants ===
The following players received wildcards into the main draw:

- (United States) Frances Altick
- (United States) Louisa Chirico
- (United States) Shelby Rogers

The following player received entry using a protected ranking into the main draw:

- (China) Peng Shuai

The following players received entry from the qualifying draw:

- (Netherlands) Cindy Burger
- (Turkey) Çağla Büyükakçay
- (Bulgaria) Sesil Karatantcheva
- (Netherlands) Lesley Kerkhove
- (Serbia) Aleksandra Krunić
- (Slovakia) Kristína Kučová
- (Japan) Naomi Osaka
- (Russia) Elena Vesnina

The following players received entry as lucky losers:

- (Slovakia) Jana Čepelová
- (Romania) Patricia Maria Țig

=== Withdrawals ===
Before the tournament

- (Germany) Mona Barthel → replaced by (Germany) Tatjana Maria
- (Czech Republic) Petra Cetkovská (right thigh injury) → replaced by (Slovakia) Jana Čepelová
- (Colombia) Mariana Duque Mariño → replaced by (Latvia) Anastasija Sevastova
- (Serbia) Jelena Janković (right shoulder injury) → replaced by (Romania) Patricia Maria Țig
- (United States) Varvara Lepchenko → replaced by (United States) Alison Riske

=== Retirements ===
- (Canada) Eugenie Bouchard
- (Germany) Angelique Kerber

== Doubles main draw entrants ==
=== Seeds ===
| Country | Player | Country | Player | Rank^{1} | Seed |
|---|---|---|---|---|---|
| USA | Bethanie Mattek-Sands | CZE | Lucie Šafářová | 11 | 1 |
| CZE | Andrea Hlaváčková | CZE | Lucie Hradecká | 21 | 2 |
| FRA | Caroline Garcia | FRA | Kristina Mladenovic | 26 | 3 |
| USA | Raquel Atawo | USA | Abigail Spears | 41 | 4 |

- ^{1} Rankings as of March 21, 2016.

=== Other entrants ===
The following pairs received wildcards into the doubles main draw:

- (United States) Hadley Berg / (United States) Paige Cline
- (United States) Madison Keys / (United States) Sloane Stephens

=== Retirements ===
- (United States) Abigail Spears (right calf injury)
