= 2017 Volvo Car Open =

- Date: April 3–9
- Edition: 45th
- Category: WTA Premier
- Draw: 56S / 16D
- Prize money: $776,000
- Surface: Clay / outdoor
- Location: Charleston, United States
- Venue: Family Circle Tennis Center

Champions

Singles
- (Russia) Daria Kasatkina

Doubles
- (United States) Bethanie Mattek-Sands / (Czech Republic) Lucie Šafářová
← 2016 ·	Charleston Open	· 2018 →

The 2017 Volvo Car Open was a women's tennis event on the 2017 WTA Tour. It took place between April 3 – 9, 2017 and was the 45th edition of the Charleston Open tournament and a Premier level tournament. The event took place at the Family Circle Tennis Center, on Daniel Island, Charleston, United States. It was the only event of the clay court season played on green clay. Unseeded Daria Kasatkina won the singles title.

== Finals ==
=== Singles ===
(Russia) Daria Kasatkina defeated (Latvia) Jeļena Ostapenko, 6–3, 6–1

- It was Kasatkina's only singles title of the year and the 1st of her career.

=== Doubles ===
(United States) Bethanie Mattek-Sands / (Czech Republic) Lucie Šafářová defeated (Czech Republic) Lucie Hradecká / (Czech Republic) Kateřina Siniaková, 6–1, 4–6, [10–7]

== Points and prize money ==
=== Point distribution ===
Event	W	F	SF	QF	Round of 16	Round of 32	Round of 64	Q	Q2	Q1
Singles	470	305	185	100	55	30	1	25	13	1
Doubles	470	305	185	100	1	—	—	—	—	—

=== Prize money ===
Event	W	F	SF	QF	Round of 16	Round of 32	Round of 64	Q2	Q1
Singles	$132,380	$70,460	$34,723	$17,858	$9,254	$4,738	$2,434	$1,106	$661
Doubles	$41,650	$22,055	$12,133	$6,175	$3,354	—	—	—	—

== Singles main draw entrants ==
=== Seeds ===
Country	Player	Ranking^{1}	Seed
USA	Madison Keys	9	1
~~GBR~~	~~Johanna Konta~~	~~11~~	~~2~~
USA	Venus Williams	12	3
RUS	Elena Vesnina	13	4
DEN	Caroline Wozniacki	14	5
AUS	Samantha Stosur	19	6
NED	Kiki Bertens	21	7
LAT	Anastasija Sevastova	25	8
AUS	Daria Gavrilova	26	9
ROU	Irina-Camelia Begu	28	10
CRO	Mirjana Lučić-Baroni	29	11
KAZ	Yulia Putintseva	32	12
CHN	Zhang Shuai	33	13
USA	Lauren Davis	34	14
CZE	Lucie Šafářová	36	15
CZE	Kateřina Siniaková	37	16

- ^{1} Rankings as of March 20, 2017.

=== Other entrants ===
The following players received wildcards into the main draw:

- (United States) ~~Hayley Carter~~ (Withdrew due to death of a family)
- (United States) Kayla Day
- (United States) Bethanie Mattek-Sands

The following players received entry from the qualifying draw:

- (Romania) Ana Bogdan
- (Paraguay) Verónica Cepede Royg
- (United States) Sofia Kenin
- (Serbia) Aleksandra Krunić
- (United States) Asia Muhammad
- (Australia) Anastasia Rodionova
- (Spain) Sílvia Soler Espinosa
- (Hungary) Fanny Stollár

The following players received entry as lucky losers

- (Tunisia) Ons Jabeur
- (United States) Grace Min

=== Withdrawals ===
Before the tournament

- (Russia) Alisa Kleybanova →replaced by (United States) Varvara Lepchenko
- (Croatia) Ana Konjuh →replaced by (Greece) Maria Sakkari
- (United Kingdom) Johanna Konta →replaced by (United States) Grace Min
- (China) Peng Shuai →replaced by (Poland) Magda Linette
- (Kazakhstan) Yaroslava Shvedova →replaced by (Germany) Mona Barthel
- (Russia) Natalia Vikhlyantseva →replaced by (Italy) Sara Errani

=== Retirements ===
- (United States) Louisa Chirico
- (Czech Republic) Kateřina Siniaková
- (Hungary) Fanny Stollár

== Doubles main draw entrants ==
=== Seeds ===
Country	Player	Country	Player	Rank^{1}	Seed
USA	Bethanie Mattek-Sands	CZE	Lucie Šafářová	3	1
CZE	Andrea Hlaváčková	IND	Sania Mirza	16	2
TPE	Chan Hao-ching	TPE	Chan Yung-jan	29	3
CZE	Lucie Hradecká	CZE	Kateřina Siniaková	35	4

- ^{1} Rankings as of March 20, 2017.

=== Other entrants ===
The following pairs received wildcards into the doubles main draw:

- (United States) Elizabeth Halbauer / (United States) Sofia Kenin
- (Serbia) Jelena Janković / (Germany) Andrea Petkovic

The following pair received entry as alternates:

- (Montenegro) Danka Kovinić / (Serbia) Aleksandra Krunić

=== Withdrawals ===
Before the tournament

- (Germany) Andrea Petkovic
