= Sherman Financial Group =

Debt collection firm

- Type: Private
- Industry: Debt collection
- Founded: 1998; 28 years ago
- Founders: Ben Navarro and Brett Hildebrand
- Headquarters: Charleston, South Carolina, United States
- Area served: United States
- Services: Invest in debt and debt collection
- Subsidiaries: Credit One Bank

Sherman Financial Group is an American private investment firm and an affiliate of Credit One Bank. Established in 1998, the firm is headquartered in Charleston, South Carolina.

While the firm historically invested in distressed consumer assets, Forbes reported in December 2025 that Sherman had divested its debt purchasing subsidiary, Resurgent Capital Services, and currently focuses on banking and global investment operations. It was reported in a 2021 article that the company had expanded its business during the 2008 financial crisis, eventually generating enough revenue to buy out its two original backers and take the company private. The article also reported the company increased its volume of debt-collection lawsuits through the COVID-19 pandemic. But it also reported that during the COVID-19 pandemic, Resurgent sued a smaller percentage of its debtors than in prior years. It is privately held and discloses minimal data about its financial results and operations.

== History ==
Sherman Financial Group was co-founded by Ben Navarro and Brett Hildebrand in 1998, who named the company after Navarro's dog. The company began its operations through the purchasing of distressed debts from other firms. Sherman received backing from investors, selling 91% of the firm to two insurance companies (one of which was Enhance Financial Services) for $40 million. The funding allowed Sherman to purchase larger portfolios of debt, which were analyzed internally by computer systems to efficiently collect on older loans. The company owns multiple subsidiaries, and at one point, its former debt-collection wing, Resurgent.

In 2005, Sherman acquired First National Bank of Marin and renamed it Credit One Bank. It is now a major credit card issuer, offering a range of cards, including some for subprime borrowers, through Visa, American Express, and Mastercard. The 2021 article stated that when a customer defaults, other Sherman entities attempted to collect on that debt.

From Sherman's inception to 2006, the company recovered more than $3.8 billion in debts.

According to the Nilson Report, between 2005 and 2009, Sherman Financial Group was the biggest buyer of defaulted credit-card debt in the United States.

In 2009, Sherman's revenue totaled $1.2 billion. In that same year, Navarro and his partners bought out the company's longtime investors, two insurance companies, and they took the company private.

In December 2021, Sherman Financial Group sold off its ownership percentage of Kroll Bond Rating Agency, a credit rating agency, for $900 million.

By 2025, the company had shifted its focus away from debt collection operations. In December 2025, media reports confirmed that Sherman Financial Group had sold its ownership of Resurgent Capital Services.

=== Litigation ===
In 2011, the state of Maryland sued Sherman Financial Group's primary debt-collection subsidiaries, alleging that they were unlicensed to collect on debt in the state. The subsidiaries had filed numerous lawsuits, which according to state regulators, "contained false, deceptive, or deviant complaints and supporting affidavits". The company settled the claim in 2012 without admitting wrongdoing, paying a penalty of $1 million and issuing credits of $3.8 million to Maryland-based customers.

In 2014, the Attorney General of New York obtained a settlement against Sherman Financial Group and the PRA Group "for repeatedly bringing improper debt collection actions against New York consumers." The case involved uncontested default judgments levied against defendants who failed to respond to suits brought the groups against them. The settlement required the abandonment of claims against debtors, changes in collection practices, and a civil fine.

Through 2019 and 2020, Sherman filed roughly 1 million debt-collection lawsuits throughout 5 jurisdictions, including New York, Wisconsin, Maryland, Missouri, and Harris County, Texas. In those jurisdictions, Sherman was responsible for 12% of debt lawsuits. Sherman also owns LVNV, a debt-purchasing firm, who filed 2,700 lawsuits in the state of Maryland in August 2020.

In June 2022, a bankruptcy judge found Credit One Bank liable to roughly 288,000 credit card customers for attempting to collect debts after such debts were discharged via bankruptcies. In this lawsuit, the judge stated that Credit One Bank had misrepresented its relationship with Sherman Financial Group, amongst other findings.
