= Daria Kasatkina career statistics =

Career finals
Discipline	Type	Won	Lost	Total
Singles	Grand Slam	–	–	–
Singles	WTA Finals	–	–	–
Singles	WTA Elite Trophy	–	–	–
Singles	WTA 1000	0	1	1
Singles	WTA 500	6	9	15
Singles	WTA 250	2	1	3
Singles	Olympics	–	–	–
Singles	Total	8	11	19
Doubles	Grand Slam	–	–	–
Doubles	WTA Finals	–	–	–
Doubles	WTA Elite Trophy	–	–	–
Doubles	WTA 1000	–	–	–
Doubles	WTA 500	1	2	3
Doubles	WTA 250	–	–	–
Doubles	Olympics	–	–	–
Doubles	Total	1	2	3

This is a list of the main career statistics of professional Russian-born Australian tennis player Daria Kasatkina.

== Performance timelines ==
Key
W	F	SF	QF	#R	RR	Q#	DNQ	A	NH

(W) winner; (F) finalist; (SF) semifinalist; (QF) quarterfinalist; (#R) rounds 4, 3, 2, 1; (RR) round-robin stage; (Q#) qualification round; (DNQ) did not qualify; (A) absent; (NH) not held; (SR) strike rate (events won / competed); (W–L) win–loss record.
To avoid confusion and double counting, these charts are updated at the conclusion of a tournament or when the player's participation has ended.

Only main-draw results in WTA Tour, Grand Slam tournaments, Fed Cup/Billie Jean King Cup and Olympic Games are included in Win–loss records.

=== Singles ===
Current through the 2026 Wimbledon Championships.

Tournament	2014	2015	2016	2017	2018	2019	2020	2021	2022	2023	2024	2025	2026	SR	W–L	Win %
Grand Slam tournaments
Australian Open	A	A	3R	1R	2R	1R	1R	2R	3R	1R	2R	4R	1R	0 / 11	10–11	48%
French Open	A	A	3R	3R	QF	2R	2R	3R	SF	4R	2R	4R	3R	0 / 11	26–11	70%
Wimbledon	A	A	3R	2R	QF	1R	NH	2R	A (Note: Suspended due to the ban of Russian and Belarusian athletes in light of the Russian invasion of Ukraine.)	3R	3R	3R	3R	0 / 9	16–9	64%
US Open	A	3R	1R	4R	2R	1R	1R	3R	1R	4R	2R	3R		0 / 11	14–11	56%
Win–loss	0–0	2–1	6–4	6–4	10–4	1–4	1–3	6–4	7–3	8–4	5–4	10–4	4–3	0 / 42	66–42	61%
National representation
Summer Olympics	NH		QF	NH				A	NH		A	NH		0 / 1	3–1	75%
Billie Jean King Cup (Note: Formerly known as Fed Cup until 2020.)	A	A	1R	PO	A	PO2	W (Note: Edition is split into the two years due to COVID-19.)		DQ					1 / 2	5–1	83%
Year-end championships
WTA Finals	DNQ				Alt	DNQ	NH	DNQ	RR	DNQ	RR	DNQ		0 / 2	1–3	25%
WTA Elite Trophy (Note: WTA Tournament of Champions was held from 2009 to 2014, when WTA Elite Trophy replaced it.)	DNQ				RR	DNQ	NH			SF	NH			0 / 2	3–2	60%
WTA 1000
Qatar Open (Note: The first Premier 5 event of the year has switched back and forth between the Dubai Tennis Championships and the Qatar Ladies Open since 2009 until 2024. Dubai was classified as a Premier 5 event from 2009 to 2011 before being succeeded by Doha for the 2012–2014 period. In 2015, Dubai regained its Premier 5 status while Doha was demoted to Premier status. The Premier 5 tournaments were reclassified as WTA 1000 tournaments in 2021.)	A	NMS	2R	NMS	1R	NMS	1R	NMS	3R	NMS	1R	3R	3R	0 / 7	7–7	50%
Dubai	NMS	A	NMS	1R	NMS	2R	NMS	1R	NMS	2R	1R	1R	2R (Note: Kasatkina withdrew before her second round match due to injury, and it is not counted as a loss.)	0 / 7	2–6	14%
Indian Wells Open	A	A	QF	2R	F	2R	NH	3R	3R	3R	4R	3R	A	0 / 9	15–9	63%
Miami Open	A	A	2R	2R	2R	3R	NH	A	2R	2R	3R	2R	A	0 / 8	3–8	27%
Madrid Open	A	A	1R	1R	QF	1R	NH	2R	3R	4R	4R	3R	1R	0 / 10	11–10	52%
Italian Open	A	A	3R	1R	3R	3R	3R	1R	SF	4R	3R	2R	1R	0 / 11	15–11	58%
Canadian Open	A	A	QF	2R	2R	2R	NH	2R	1R	QF	2R	3R		0 / 9	11–9	55%
Cincinnati Open	A	A	1R	2R	1R	2R	1R	1R	1R	3R	2R	2R		0 / 10	5–10	33%
Guadalajara Open	NH								3R	A	NMS			0 / 1	1–1	50%
China Open	A	A	2R	QF	1R	QF	NH			2R	3R	1R		0 / 7	9–7	56%
Wuhan Open	A	A	3R	3R	3R	1R	NH				3R	A		0 / 5	7–5	58%
Win–loss	0–0	0–0	14–9	7–9	13–9	9–9	2–3	3–6	10–8	11–8	9–10	5–9	3–3	0 / 84	86–83	51%
Career statistics
	2014	2015	2016	2017	2018	2019	2020	2021	2022	2023	2024	2025	2026	Career		
Tournaments	1	5	21	22	25	21	12	23	23	25	25	22	10	Career total: 223		
Titles	0	0	0	1	1	0	0	2	2	0	2	0	0	Career total: 8		
Finals	0	0	0	2	3	0	0	4	2	2	6	0	0	Career total: 19		
Hard win–loss	0–1	5–2	23–15	23–16	23–14	9–15	5–9	26–11	25–15	23–17	24–17	12–13	4–5	6 / 157	202–150	58%
Clay win–loss	0–0	2–3	8–5	8–4	12–7	4–4	3–3	5–5	12–5	12–6	8–4	5–5	0–3	1 / 54	79–53	60%
Grass win–loss	0–0	0–0	2–2	1–1	7–3	0–2	0–0	7–3	4–2	6–3	8–2	2–4	0–0	1 / 23	37–22	63%
Overall win–loss	0–1	7–5	33–22	32–21	42–24	13–21	8–12	38–19	41–22	41–26	40–23	19–22	4–9	8 / 235	318–226	58%
Win (%)	0%	58%	60%	60%	64%	38%	40%	67%	65%	61%	63%	46%	31%	Career total: 58%		
Year–end ranking	370	72	27	24	10	69	71	26	8	18	9	37		$14,515,395		

=== Doubles ===
Current through the 2025 WTA Tour.

Tournament	2015	2016	2017	2018	2019	2020	2021	2022	2023	2024	2025	SR	W–L	SR
Grand Slam tournaments
Australian Open	A	2R	1R	1R	A	A	1R	1R	A	A	A	0 / 5	1–5	17%
French Open	A	1R	2R	1R	3R	A	A	A	A	A	A	0 / 4	3–4	43%
Wimbledon	A	3R	A	A	1R	NH	1R	A	A	A	A	0 / 3	2–3	40%
US Open	A	2R	3R	A	2R (Note: Kasatkina and Anett Kontaveit withdrew from the 2019 US Open before their second-round match, which does not officially count as a loss.)	A	2R	A	A	A	A	0 / 4	5–3	63%
Win–loss	0–0	4–4	3–3	0–2	3–2	0–0	1–3	0–1	0–0	0–0	0–0	0 / 16	11–15	42%
Olympic Games
Summer Olympics	NH	QF	NH				A	NH		A	NH	0 / 1	2–1	67%
WTA 1000
Dubai / Qatar Open	A	SF	2R	A	1R	A	A	A	A	A	A	0 / 3	4–3	57%
Indian Wells Open	A	2R	A	1R	A	NH	1R	A	1R	A	A	0 / 4	1–5	17%
Miami Open	A	2R	A	1R	QF	NH	A	A	1R	A	A	0 / 4	3–4	43%
Madrid Open	A	1R	A	A	1R	NH	A	A	1R	A	1R	0 / 4	0–4	0%
Italian Open	A	A	A	A	A	A	1R	A	1R	A	2R	0 / 3	1–3	25%
Canadian Open	A	1R	A	A	A	NH	A	A	A	A		0 / 1	0–1	0%
Cincinnati Open	A	1R	2R	A	A	A	2R	A	A	A		0 / 3	2–3	40%
Guadalajara Open	NH							A	A	A	NH	0 / 0	0–0	–
Wuhan Open	A	1R	2R	A	1R	NH			A	A		0 / 3	1–3	33%
China Open	A	1R	A	A	A	NH			A	A		0 / 1	0–1	0%
Career statistics
Tournaments	1	17	7	5	9	0	7	2	5	1	4	Career total: 58		
Titles	1	0	0	0	0	0	0	0	0	0	0	Career total: 1		
Finals	1	1	1	0	0	0	0	0	0	0	0	Career total: 3		
Hard win–loss	4–0	13–12	10–9	0–3	3–4	0–0	3–5	1–1	0–2	2–0	0–0	1 / 48	36–36	50%
Clay win–loss	0–0	1–3	0–0	0–1	2–2	0–0	0–1	0–0	0–1	0–0	1–1	0 / 14	4–9	31%
Grass win–loss	0–0	2–2	1–1	1–1	0–2	0–0	0–1	0–0	1–1	0–0	0–2	0 / 9	5–9	36%
Overall win–loss	4–0	16–17	11–10	1–5	5–8	0–0	3–7	1–1	1–4	2–0	1–3	1 / 58	45–54	45%
Year-end ranking	118	48	67	412	127	141	283	642	489	378				

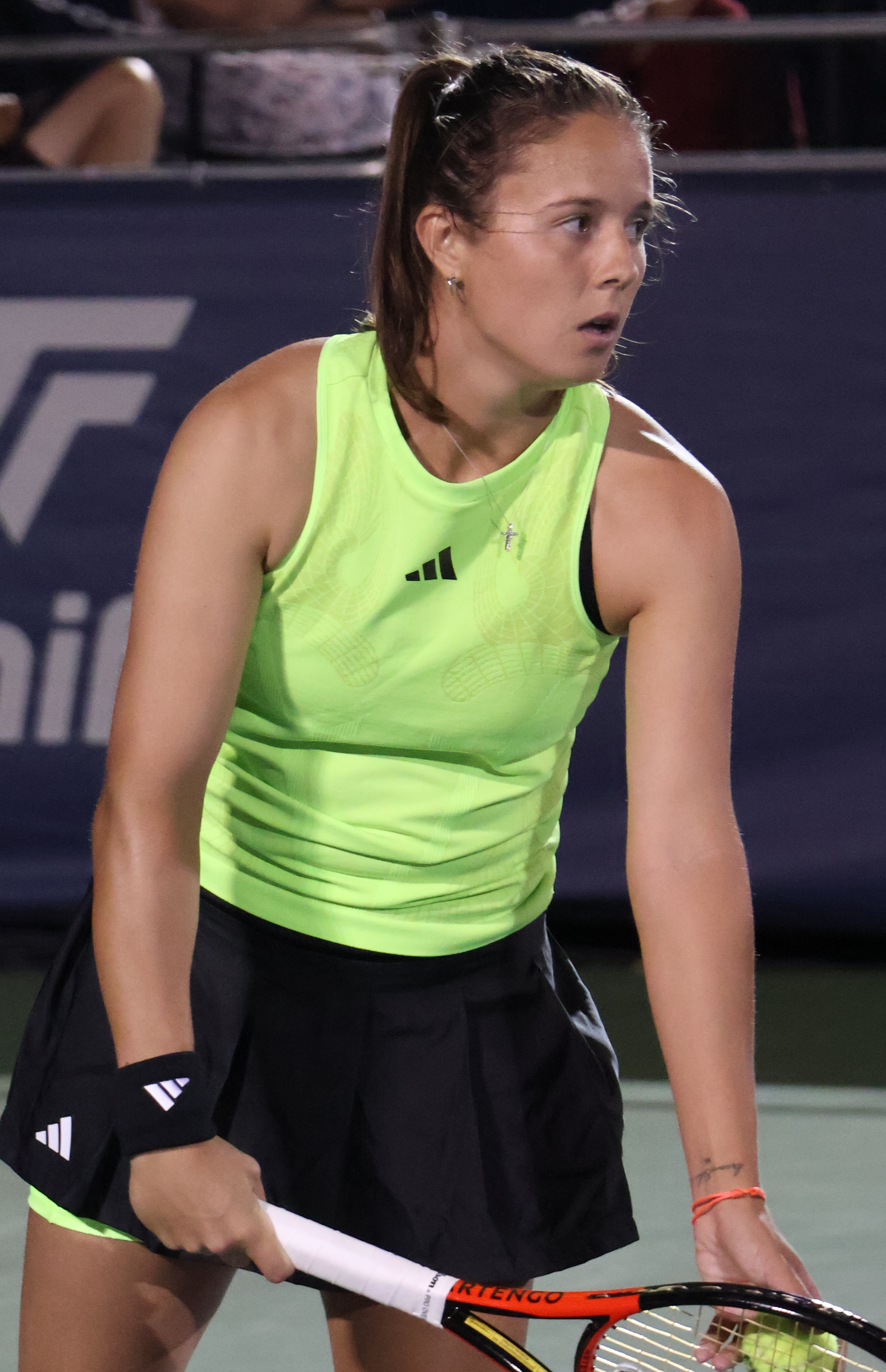
Kasatkina at the 2023 Washington Open.

== WTA 1000 tournament finals ==
=== Singles: 1 (runner-up) ===
Result	Year	Tournament	Surface	Opponent	Score
Loss	2018	Indian Wells Open	Hard	(Japan) Naomi Osaka	3–6, 2–6

== WTA Tour finals ==
=== Singles: 19 (8 titles, 11 runner-ups) ===
Legend WTA 1000 (0–1) WTA 500 / Premier (6–9) WTA 250 / International (2–1)	Finals by surface Hard (6–8) Clay (1–1) Grass (1–2)	Finals by setting Outdoor (6–10) Indoor (2–1)

Result	W–L	Date	Tournament	Tier	Surface	Opponent	Score
Win	1–0	Apr 2017	Charleston Open, United States	Premier (Note: The WTA Premier tournaments were reclassified as WTA 500 tournaments in 2021.)	Clay	(Latvia) Jeļena Ostapenko	6–3, 6–1
Loss	1–1	Oct 2017	Kremlin Cup, Russia	Premier	Hard (i)	(Germany) Julia Görges	1–6, 2–6
Loss	1–2	Feb 2018	Dubai Championships, UAE	Premier	Hard	(Ukraine) Elina Svitolina	4–6, 0–6
Loss	1–3	Mar 2018	Indian Wells Open, United States	Premier M (Note: The WTA Premier 5 & Mandatory tournaments were reclassified as WTA 1000 tournaments in 2021.)	Hard	(Japan) Naomi Osaka	3–6, 2–6
Win	2–3	Oct 2018	Kremlin Cup, Russia	Premier	Hard (i)	(Tunisia) Ons Jabeur	2–6, 7–6^{(7–3)}, 6–4
Win	3–3	Feb 2021	Phillip Island Trophy, Australia	WTA 250	Hard	(Czech Republic) Marie Bouzková	4–6, 6–2, 6–2
Win	4–3	Mar 2021	St. Petersburg Trophy, Russia	WTA 500	Hard (i)	(Russia) Margarita Gasparyan	6–3, 2–1, ret.
Loss	4–4	Jun 2021	Birmingham Classic, United Kingdom	WTA 250	Grass	(Tunisia) Ons Jabeur	5–7, 4–6
Loss	4–5	Aug 2021	Silicon Valley Classic, United States	WTA 500	Hard	(United States) Danielle Collins	3–6, 7–6^{(12–10)}, 1–6
Win	5–5	Aug 2022	Silicon Valley Classic, United States	WTA 500	Hard	(United States) Shelby Rogers	6–7^{(2–7)}, 6–1, 6–2
Win	6–5	Aug 2022	Championnats de Granby, Canada	WTA 250	Hard	(Australia) Daria Saville	6–4, 6–4
Loss	6–6	Jan 2023	Adelaide International, Australia	WTA 500	Hard	(Switzerland) Belinda Bencic	0–6, 2–6
Loss	6–7	Jun 2023	Eastbourne International, UK	WTA 500	Grass	(United States) Madison Keys	2–6, 6–7^{(13–15)}
Loss	6–8	Jan 2024	Adelaide International, Australia	WTA 500	Hard	(Latvia) Jeļena Ostapenko	3–6, 2–6
Loss	6–9	Feb 2024	Abu Dhabi Open, UAE	WTA 500	Hard	(Kazakhstan) Elena Rybakina	1–6, 4–6
Loss	6–10	Apr 2024	Charleston Open, US	WTA 500	Clay	(United States) Danielle Collins	2–6, 1–6
Win	7–10	Jun 2024	Eastbourne International, UK	WTA 500	Grass	(Canada) Leylah Fernandez	6–3, 6–4
Loss	7–11	Sep 2024	Korea Open, South Korea	WTA 500	Hard	(Brazil) Beatriz Haddad Maia	6–1, 4–6, 1–6
Win	8–11	Oct 2024	Ningbo Open, China	WTA 500	Hard	Mirra Andreeva	6–0, 4–6, 6–4

=== Doubles: 3 (1 title, 2 runner-ups) ===
Legend WTA 500 / Premier (1–2) WTA 250 / International (0–0)	Finals by surface Hard (1–2) Clay (0–0)	Finals by setting Outdoor (0–1) Indoor (1–1)

Result	W–L	Date	Tournament	Tier	Surface	Partner	Opponents	Score
Win	1–0	Oct 2015	Kremlin Cup, Russia	Premier	Hard (i)	(Russia) Elena Vesnina	(Romania) Irina-Camelia Begu (Romania) Monica Niculescu	6–3, 6–7^{(7–9)}, [10–5]
Loss	1–1	Oct 2016	Kremlin Cup, Russia	Premier	Hard (i)	(Australia) Daria Gavrilova	(Czech Republic) Andrea Hlaváčková (Czech Republic) Lucie Hradecká	6–4, 0–6, [7–10]
Loss	1–2	Sep 2017	Pan Pacific Open, Japan	Premier	Hard	(Australia) Daria Gavrilova	(Slovenia) Andreja Klepač (Spain) María José Martínez Sánchez	3–6, 2–6

== WTA 125 finals ==
=== Singles: 1 (title) ===
Result	W–L	Date	Tournament	Surface	Opponent	Score
Win	1–0	May 2026	Catalonia Open, Spain	Clay	(Germany) Tamara Korpatsch	2–6, 6–3, 7–5

== ITF Circuit finals ==
=== Singles: 7 (7 titles) ===
Legend $50,000 tournaments (1–0) $25,000 tournaments (5–0) $10,000 tournaments (1–0)	Finals by surface Hard (1–0) Clay (6–0)

Result	W–L	Date	Tournament	Tier	Surface	Opponent	Score
Win	1–0	Jan 2014	ITF Sharm El Sheikh, Egypt	10,000	Hard	(Czech Republic) Pernilla Mendesová	6–3, 6–4
Win	2–0	Sep 2014	Telavi Open, Georgia	25,000	Clay	(Italy) Jasmine Paolini	6–1, 4–6, [10–7]
Win	3–0	Jan 2015	ITF Daytona Beach, United States	25,000	Clay	(Belgium) Elise Mertens	6–2, 4–6, 6–0
Win	4–0	May 2015	ITF Caserta, Italy	25,000	Clay	(Turkey) İpek Soylu	7–6^{(7–4)}, 6–1
Win	5–0	Jun 2015	ITF Minsk, Belarus	25,000	Clay	(Ukraine) Ganna Poznikhirenko	4–3 ret.
Win	6–0	Jun 2015	ITF Minsk, Belarus	25,000	Clay	(Belarus) Iryna Shymanovich	6–1, 6–1
Win	7–0	Sep 2015	Open de Saint-Malo, France	50,000	Clay	(Germany) Laura Siegemund	7–5, 7–6^{(7–4)}

=== Doubles: 2 (2 runner-ups) ===
Legend $25,000 tournaments (0–2)	Finals by surface Clay (0–2)

Result	W–L	Date	Tournament	Tier	Surface	Partner	Opponents	Score
Loss	0–1	May 2015	ITF Moscow, Russia	25,000	Clay	(Ukraine) Olga Ianchuk	(Germany) Carolin Daniels (Ukraine) Alyona Sotnikova	2–6, 6–7^{(10–12)}
Loss	0–2	Jun 2015	ITF Minsk, Belarus	25,000	Clay	(Ukraine) Olga Ianchuk	(Russia) Valentyna Ivakhnenko (Russia) Polina Monova	6–4, 0–6, [10–12]

== Junior Grand Slam tournament finals ==
=== Singles: 1 (title) ===
Result	Year	Tournament	Surface	Opponent	Score
Win	2014	French Open	Clay	(Serbia) Ivana Jorović	6–7^{(5–7)}, 6–2, 6–3

== Fed Cup/Billie Jean King Cup participation ==
This table is current through the 2019 Fed Cup

=== Singles (3–1) ===
Edition	Round	Date	Location	Against	Surface	Opponent	W/L	Result
2016	WG PO	Apr 2016	Moscow (RUS)	Belarus	Clay (i)	Aliaksandra Sasnovich	W	6–3, 3–6, 6–1
2016	WG PO	Apr 2016	Moscow (RUS)	Belarus	Clay (i)	Victoria Azarenka	L	2–6, 7–5, 3–6
2017	WG PO	Apr 2017	Moscow (RUS)	Belgium	Clay (i)	Maryna Zanevska	W	5–7, 6–1, 6–0
2019	Z1 RR	Feb 2019	Zielona Góra (POL)	Denmark	Hard (i)	Karen Barritza	W	6–0, 6–4

=== Doubles (2–2) ===
Edition	Round	Date	Location	Against	Surface	Partner	Opponents	W/L	Result
2016	WG QF	Feb 2016	Moscow (RUS)	Netherlands	Hard (i)	Ekaterina Makarova	Cindy Burger; Arantxa Rus	W	6–0, 6–2
2016	WG PO	Apr 2016	Moscow (RUS)	Belarus	Clay (i)	Elena Vesnina	Olga Govortsova; Aryna Sabalenka	W	6–4, 6–2
2017	WG PO	Apr 2017	Moscow (RUS)	Belgium	Clay (i)	Elena Vesnina	Elise Mertens; An-Sophie Mestach	L	1–6, 6–7^{(2–7)}
2019	Z1 RR	Feb 2019	Zielona Góra (POL)	Poland	Hard (i)	Margarita Gasparyan	Alicja Rosolska; Iga Świątek	L	0–6, 6–3, 3–6

== WTA Tour career earnings ==
Current after the 2022 US Open.

Year	Grand Slam titles	WTA titles	Total titles	Earnings ($)	Money list rank
2013	0	0	0	2,217	100+
2014	0	0	0	14,183	392
2015	0	0	0	217,966	131
2016	0	0	0	904,463	34
2017	0	1	1	1,156,824	31
2018	0	1	1	2,747,441	13
2019	0	0	0	1,037,359	41
2020	0	0	0	308,998	80
2021	0	2	2	905,299	34
2022	0	2	2	1,508,435	19
Career	0	6	6	8,803,184	71

== Career Grand Slam statistics ==
=== Seedings ===
The tournaments won by Kasatkina are in boldface, and advanced into finals by Kasatkina are in italics.

Year	Australian Open	French Open	Wimbledon	US Open
2015	did not play	did not play	did not play	lucky loser
2016	not seeded	29th	29th	23rd
2017	23rd	26th	29th	not seeded
2018	22nd	14th	14th	11th
2019	10th	21st	29th	not seeded
2020	not seeded	not seeded	cancelled	not seeded
2021	not seeded	not seeded	not seeded	not seeded
2022	25th	20th	absent/expelled	10th
2023	8th	9th	11th	13th
2024	14th	10th	14th	12th
2025	9th	17th	16th	

=== Best Grand Slam results details ===
Grand Slam winners are in boldface, and runner–ups are in italics.

==== Singles ====
**Australian Open**
**2025 (9th)**
Round	Opponent	Rank	Score
1R	(Bulgaria) Viktoriya Tomova	58	6–1, 6–3
2R	(China) Wang Yafan	64	6–2, 6–0
3R	(Kazakhstan) Yulia Putintseva (24)	23	7–5, 6–1
4R	(United States) Emma Navarro (8)	8	4–6, 7–5, 5–7

**Wimbledon**
**2018 (14th)**
Round	Opponent	Rank	Score
1R	(Croatia) Jana Fett	114	6–2, 7–5
2R	(Kazakhstan) Yulia Putintseva	53	6–2, 6–3
3R	(Australia) Ashleigh Barty (17)	17	7–5, 6–3
4R	(Belgium) Alison Van Uytvanck	47	6–7^{(6–8)}, 6–3, 6–2
QF	**(Germany) Angelique Kerber (11)**	10	3–6, 5–7
**2024 (14th)**
Round	Opponent	Rank	Score
1R	(China) Zhang Shuai (PR)	680	6–3, 6–0
2R	(United Kingdom) Lily Miyazaki (WC)	148	6–0, 6–0
3R	(United States) Bernarda Pera	97	6–1, 6–3
4R	(Kazakhstan) Yulia Putintseva	35	6–2, 6–3
QF	**(Czech Republic) Barbora Krejčíková (31)**	32	4–6, 6–7^{(4–7)}

**French Open**
**2022 (20th)**
Round	Opponent	Rank	Score
1R	(Slovakia) Rebecca Šramková (LL)	176	6–2, 6–0
2R	(Serbia) Aleksandra Krunić (Q)	114	6–0, 6–3
3R	(United States) Shelby Rogers	50	6–3, 6–2
4R	(Italy) Camila Giorgi (28)	30	6–2, 6–2
QF	Veronika Kudermetova (29)	29	6–4, 7–6^{(7–5)}
SF	**(Poland) Iga Świątek (1)**	**1**	2–6, 1–6

**US Open**
**2017 (not seeded)**
Round	Opponent	Rank	Score
1R	(China) Wang Qiang	56	6–7^{(7–9)}, 6–2, 6–3
2R	(United States) Christina McHale	63	7–5, 6–3
3R	(Latvia) Jeļena Ostapenko (12)	12	6–3, 6–2
4R	(Estonia) Kaia Kanepi (Q)	418	4–6, 4–6
**2022 (10th)**
Round	Opponent	Rank	Score
1R	(Croatia) Donna Vekić	84	7–5, 6–3
2R	(Belgium) Maryna Zanevska	97	6–2, 6–3
3R	(Hungary) Dalma Gálfi	91	6–2, 6–0
4R	(Tunisia) Ons Jabeur (5)	5	6–7^{(1–7)}, 4–6
**2023 (13th)**
Round	Opponent	Rank	Score
1R	(United States) Alycia Parks	42	2–6, 6–4, 6–2
2R	(United States) Sofia Kenin	101	2–6, 6–4, 6–4
3R	(Belgium) Greet Minnen (Q)	97	6–3, 6–4
4R	Aryna Sabalenka (2)	2	1–6, 3–6

== Wins against top 10 players ==
- Kasatkina has a 24–48 record against players who were, at the time the match was played, ranked in the top 10.

#	Player	Rk	Event	Surface	Rd	Score	Rk	Source
2016
1.	(United States) Venus Williams	7	Auckland Open, New Zealand	Hard	1R	6–7^{(4–7)}, 6–3, 6–3	75	
2.	(Italy) Roberta Vinci	8	Canadian Open, Canada	Hard	3R	7–5, 6–3	33	
2017
3.	(Germany) Angelique Kerber	1	Sydney International, Australia	Hard	2R	7–6^{(7–5)}, 6–2	26	
4.	(Germany) Angelique Kerber	2	Qatar Ladies Open, Qatar	Hard	2R	6–4, 0–6, 6–4	32	
5.	(Romania) Simona Halep	2	Wuhan Open, China	Hard	2R	6–2, 6–1	31	
2018
6.	(Denmark) Caroline Wozniacki	1	St. Petersburg Open, Russia	Hard (i)	QF	7–6^{(7–2)}, 6–3	23	
7.	(Spain) Garbiñe Muguruza	3	Dubai Championships, United Arab Emirates	Hard	SF	3–6, 7–6^{(13–11)}, 6–1	24	
8.	(Denmark) Caroline Wozniacki	2	Indian Wells Open, US	Hard	4R	6–4, 7–5	19	
9.	(Germany) Angelique Kerber	10	Indian Wells Open, US	Hard	QF	6–0, 6–2	19	
10.	(United States) Venus Williams	8	Indian Wells Open, US	Hard	SF	4–6, 6–4, 7–5	19	
11.	(Spain) Garbiñe Muguruza	3	Madrid Open, Spain	Clay	3R	6–2, 4–6, 6–3	15	
12.	(Denmark) Caroline Wozniacki	2	French Open, France	Clay	4R	7–6^{(7–5)}, 6–3	14	
2021
13.	(Poland) Iga Świątek	9	Eastbourne International, UK	Grass	2R	4–6, 6–0, 6–1	34	
2022
14.	(Spain) Garbiñe Muguruza	3	Sydney International, Australia	Hard	QF	6–4, 6–4	26	
15.	(Greece) Maria Sakkari	5	Madrid Open, Spain	Clay	2R	3–6, 6–3, 6–1	23	
16.	(Spain) Paula Badosa	3	Italian Open, Italy	Clay	3R	6–4, 6–4	23	
17.	Aryna Sabalenka	6	Silicon Valley Open, US	Hard	QF	4–6, 7–5, 6–0	12	
18.	(Spain) Paula Badosa	4	Silicon Valley Open, US	Hard	SF	6–2, 6–4	12	
19.	(United States) Coco Gauff	4	WTA Finals, United States	Hard (i)	RR	7–6^{(8–6)}, 6–3	8	
2023
20.	(France) Caroline Garcia	5	Eastbourne International, UK	Grass	QF	6–2, 2–1, ret.	11	
21.	(Czech Republic) Barbora Krejčíková	10	WTA Elite Trophy, China	Hard	RR	7–5, 1–6, 6–1	17	
2024
22.	(United States) Jessica Pegula	5	Charleston Open, US	Clay	SF	6–4, 4–6, 7–6^{(7–5)}	11	
23.	(Italy) Jasmine Paolini	7	Eastbourne International, UK	Grass	SF	3–6, 7–5, 6–3	14	
2025
24.	(Spain) Paula Badosa	10	French Open, France	Clay	3R	6–1, 7–5	17	
