= 2017 Volvo Car Open – Doubles =

Doubles
- 2017 Volvo Car Open

Final
- Champions: (United States) Bethanie Mattek-Sands (Czech Republic) Lucie Šafářová
- Runners-up: (Czech Republic) Lucie Hradecká (Czech Republic) Kateřina Siniaková
- Score: 6–1, 4–6, [10–7]

Details
- Draw: 16
- Seeds: 4

Events
Singles	Doubles
← 2016 ·	Charleston Open	· 2018 →

Caroline Garcia and Kristina Mladenovic were the defending champions, but chose not to participate this year.

Bethanie Mattek-Sands and Lucie Šafářová won the title, defeating Lucie Hradecká and Kateřina Siniaková in the final, 6–1, 4–6, [10–7].

== Seeds ==
1. (United States) Bethanie Mattek-Sands / (Czech Republic) Lucie Šafářová (champions)
2. (Czech Republic) Andrea Hlaváčková / (India) Sania Mirza (quarterfinals)
3. (Chinese Taipei) Chan Hao-ching / (Chinese Taipei) Chan Yung-jan (first round)
4. (Czech Republic) Lucie Hradecká / (Czech Republic) Kateřina Siniaková (final)

== Draw ==
=== Key ===
- Q = Qualifier
- WC = Wild card
- LL = Lucky loser
- Alt = Alternate
- ITF = ITF entry
- PR = Protected ranking
- SR = Special ranking
- SE = Special exempt
- JE = Junior exempt
- JR = Junior Accelerator Programme entrant
- CO = College Accelerator Programme entrant
- NG = Next Gen Accelerator Program entrant
- w/o = Walkover
- r = Retired
- d = Defaulted

First round
1	(United States) B Mattek-Sands (Czech Republic) L Šafářová	6	6
WC	(United States) E Halbauer (United States) S Kenin	3	2
(United States) J Brady (United States) A Riske	6	7^{7}
(United States) L Davis (United States) S Rogers	2	6^{2}
3	(Chinese Taipei) H-c Chan (Chinese Taipei) Y-j Chan	6	6^{2}	[6]
(Germany) A-L Grönefeld (Czech Republic) K Peschke	1	7^{7}	[10]
(Ukraine) K Bondarenko (Canada) G Dabrowski	1	4
(United States) A Spears (Slovenia) K Srebotnik	6	6
(United States) A Muhammad (United States) T Townsend	4	2
(Croatia) D Jurak (Australia) An Rodionova	6	6
Alt	(Montenegro) D Kovinić (Serbia) A Krunić	4	5
4	(Czech Republic) L Hradecká (Czech Republic) K Siniaková	6	7
(United States) R Atawo (Latvia) J Ostapenko	6	6
(Romania) I-C Begu (Germany) L Siegemund	3	3
(Australia) D Gavrilova (Russia) D Kasatkina	6	3	[3]
2	(Czech Republic) A Hlaváčková (India) S Mirza	1	6	[10]

Quarterfinals
1	(United States) B Mattek-Sands (Czech Republic) L Šafářová	6	6
(United States) J Brady (United States) A Riske	3	2
(Germany) A-L Grönefeld (Czech Republic) K Peschke	7	6
(United States) A Spears (Slovenia) K Srebotnik	5	2
(Croatia) D Jurak (Australia) An Rodionova	2	4
4	(Czech Republic) L Hradecká (Czech Republic) K Siniaková	6	6
(United States) R Atawo (Latvia) J Ostapenko	6	6
2	(Czech Republic) A Hlaváčková (India) S Mirza	2	4

Semifinals
1	(United States) B Mattek-Sands (Czech Republic) L Šafářová	6	6
(Germany) A-L Grönefeld (Czech Republic) K Peschke	3	0
4	(Czech Republic) L Hradecká (Czech Republic) K Siniaková	6	7^{7}
(United States) R Atawo (Latvia) J Ostapenko	1	6^{2}

Final
1	(United States) B Mattek-Sands (Czech Republic) L Šafářová	6	4	[10]
4	(Czech Republic) L Hradecká (Czech Republic) K Siniaková	1	6	[7]
