= Sloane Stephens career statistics =

Career finals
Discipline	Type	Won	Lost	Total	WR
Singles	Grand Slam	1	1	2	0.50
Singles	Summer Olympics	–	–	–	–
Singles	WTA Finals	0	1	1	0.00
Singles	WTA 1000	1	1	2	0.50
Singles	WTA 500 & 250	6	0	6	1.00
Singles	Total	8	3	11	0.73
Doubles	Grand Slam	–	–	–	–
Doubles	Summer Olympics	–	–	–	–
Doubles	WTA Finals	–	–	–	–
Doubles	WTA 1000	–	–	–	–
Doubles	WTA 500 & 250	1	1	2	0.50
Doubles	Total	1	1	2	0.50

This is a list of the main career statistics of professional American tennis player Sloane Stephens. She was the women's singles champion at the 2017 US Open and runner-up at the 2018 French Open and 2018 WTA Finals.

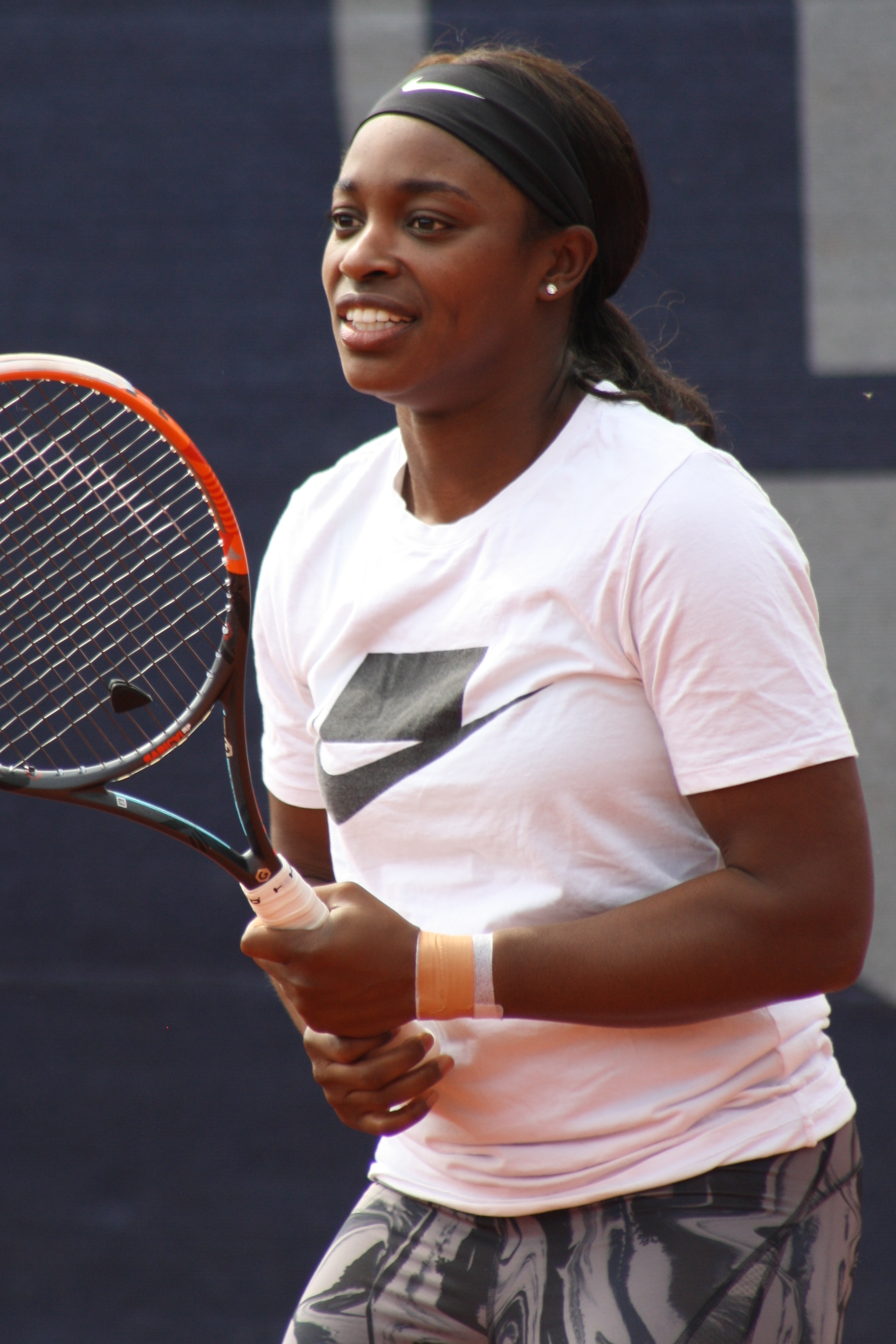
Stephens in 2018

== Performance timelines ==
Key
W	F	SF	QF	#R	RR	Q#	P#	DNQ	A	Z#	PO	G	S	B	NMS	NTI	P	NH

(W) winner; (F) finalist; (SF) semifinalist; (QF) quarterfinalist; (#R) rounds 4, 3, 2, 1; (RR) round-robin stage; (Q#) qualification round; (P#) preliminary round; (DNQ) did not qualify; (A) absent; (Z#) Davis/Fed Cup Zonal Group (with number indication) or (PO) play-off; (G) gold, (S) silver or (B) bronze Olympic/Paralympic medal; (NMS) not a Masters tournament; (NTI) not a Tier I tournament; (P) postponed; (NH) not held; (SR) strike rate (events won / competed); (W–L) win–loss record.
To avoid confusion and double counting, these charts are updated at the conclusion of a tournament or when the player's participation has ended.

Only main-draw results in WTA Tour, Grand Slam tournaments, Fed Cup/Billie Jean King Cup, Hopman Cup, United Cup and Olympic Games are included in win–loss records.

=== Singles ===
Current through the 2026 Indian Wells Open.

Tournament	2008	2009	2010	2011	2012	2013	2014	2015	2016	2017	2018	2019	2020	2021	2022	2023	2024	2025	2026	SR	W–L	Win %
Grand Slam tournaments
Australian Open	A	A	A	Q2	2R	SF	4R	1R	1R	A	1R	4R	1R	1R	1R	1R	3R	1R	1R	0 / 14	14–14	50%
French Open	A	A	A	1R	4R	4R	4R	4R	3R	A	F	QF	2R	4R	QF	4R	1R	A		0 / 13	35–13	73%
Wimbledon	A	A	A	Q2	3R	QF	1R	3R	3R	1R	1R	3R	NH	3R	1R	2R	2R	A		0 / 12	16–12	57%
US Open	Q2	Q1	Q2	3R	3R	4R	2R	1R	A	W	QF	1R	3R	3R	2R	1R	1R	A		1 / 13	24–12	69%
Win–loss	0–0	0–0	0–0	2–2	8–4	15–4	7–4	5–4	4–3	7–1	10–4	9–4	3–3	7–4	5–4	4–4	3–4	0–1	0–1	1 / 52	89–51	64%
Year-end championships
WTA Finals	DNQ										F	DNQ	NH	DNQ						0 / 1	4–1	80%
WTA Elite Trophy (Note: WTA Tournament of Champions was held from 2009 to 2014, when WTA Elite Trophy replaced it.)	NH	DNQ								RR	A	A	NH			A	NH			0 / 1	0–2	0%
National representation
Summer Olympics	A	NH			A	NH			1R	NH				A	NH		A	NH		0 / 1	0–1	0%
Billie Jean King Cup (Note: formerly known as Fed Cup until 2020)	A	A	A	A	PO	PO	PO	A	PO	W	F	PO	SF (Note: Edition is split into the two years due to COVID-19.)		A	A	A	A		1 / 3	7–5	58%
WTA 1000
Qatar Open (Note: The first Premier 5 event of the year has switched back and forth between the Dubai Tennis Championships and the Qatar Ladies Open since 2009. Dubai was classified as a Premier 5 event from 2009 to 2011 before being succeeded by Doha for the 2012–2014 period. In 2015, Dubai regained its Premier 5 status while Doha was demoted to Premier status. The Premier 5 tournaments were reclassified as WTA 1000 tournaments in 2021. From 2024, both Doha and Dubai were classified as WTA 1000 titles)	A	NH		NMS	A	2R	1R	NMS	A	NMS	A	NMS	A	NMS	A	NMS	1R	A	A	0 / 3	1–3	25%
Dubai Open	A	A	A	A	NMS			A	NMS	A	NMS	A	NMS	A	NMS	A	2R	A	A	0 / 1	1–1	50%
Indian Wells Open	A	A	2R	2R	2R	2R	QF	4R	2R	A	3R	2R	NH	2R	1R	1R	3R	A	1R	0 / 14	13–14	48%
Miami Open	Q1	Q1	Q1	1R	3R	4R	3R	QF	2R	A	W	3R	NH	2R	2R	1R	2R	A		1 / 12	19–11	63%
Madrid Open	NH	A	A	Q1	Q1	1R	3R	2R	2R	A	3R	SF	NH	2R	1R	1R	3R	A		0 / 10	13–10	57%
Italian Open	A	A	A	A	2R	3R	2R	1R	A	A	3R	2R	1R	1R	1R	2R	2R	A		0 / 11	7–11	39%
Canadian Open	A	A	A	A	A	3R	2R	1R	1R	SF	F	2R	NH	2R	2R	3R	1R	A		0 / 11	14–11	56%
Cincinnati Open	NMS	A	A	1R	3R	3R	3R	3R	A	SF	3R	3R	1R	1R	2R	3R	A	A		0 / 12	17–12	59%
Guadalajara Open	NH														QF	2R	NMS			0 / 2	4–2	67%
Pan Pacific / Wuhan Open (Note: In 2014, the Pan Pacific Open was downgraded to a Premier event and replaced by the Wuhan Open. The Premier 5 tournaments were reclassified as WTA 1000 tournaments in 2021.)	A	A	A	A	A	2R	A	2R	A	1R	1R	3R	NH				A	A		0 / 5	4–5	44%
China Open	A	A	A	A	A	3R	A	2R	A	1R	3R	2R	NH			A	A	A		0 / 5	6–5	55%
Win–loss	0–0	0–0	1–1	1–3	6–4	12–9	10–7	12–8	1–4	8–4	18–7	9–8	0–2	4–6	6–7	5–7	6–7	0–0	0–1	1 / 86	99–85	54%
Career statistics
	2008	2009	2010	2011	2012	2013	2014	2015	2016	2017	2018	2019	2020	2021	2022	2023	2024	2025	2026	SR	W–L	Win %
Tournaments	0	0	3	9	17	22	19	21	13	8	20	19	11	17	18	19	22	5	3	Career total: 246		
Titles	0	0	0	0	0	0	0	1	3	1	1	0	0	0	1	0	1	0	0	Career total: 8		
Finals	0	0	0	0	0	0	0	1	3	1	4	0	0	0	1	0	1	0	0	Career total: 11		
Hard win–loss	0–0	0–0	1–1	6–6	12–10	28–17	12–11	19–13	11–6	15–9	25–13	12–13	3–8	7–12	13–9	11–14	8–13	0–5	0–3	6 / 169	183–163	53%
Clay win–loss	0–0	0–0	1–2	1–3	7–6	7–5	6–6	8–5	9–3	0–0	12–5	10–4	1–3	10–5	5–6	8–5	9–5	0–0	0–0	2 / 65	94–63	60%
Grass win–loss	0–0	0–0	0–0	0–0	2–1	4–1	3–3	5–2	2–1	0–1	0–1	2–2	0–0	2–1	0–2	1–1	2–3	0–0	0–0	0 / 19	23–19	55%
Overall win–loss	0–0	0–0	2–3	7–9	21–17	39–23	21–20	32–20	22–10	15–10	37–19	24–19	4–11	19–18	18–17	20–20	19–21	0–5	0–0	8 / 253	300–261	53%
Win (%)	–	–	40%	44%	55%	63%	51%	62%	69%	60%	66%	56%	27%	51%	51%	50%	48%	0%	0%	Career total: 55%		
Year–end ranking	496	802	198	97	38	12	37	30	36	13	6	25	39	64	37	48	79	1062		$19,121,309		

=== Doubles ===
Tournament	2009	2010	2011	2012	2013	2014	2015	2016	2017	2018	...	2022	2023	2024	SR	W–L
Australian Open	A	A	A	1R	A	A	A	A	A	1R		A	A	A	0 / 2	0–2
French Open	A	A	A	1R	1R	1R	A	A	A	A		A	A	1R	0 / 4	0–4
Wimbledon	A	A	A	1R	A	A	A	1R	2R	A		A	1R	1R	0 / 5	1–5
US Open	1R	1R	1R	1R	A	A	A	A	1R	A		A	A	1R	0 / 6	0–6
Win–loss	0–1	0–1	0–1	0–4	0–1	0–1	0–0	0–1	1–2	0–1		0–0	0-1	0-3	0 / 17	1–17

== Grand Slam tournament finals ==
=== Singles: 2 (1 title, 1 runner-up) ===
Result	Year	Championship	Surface	Opponent	Score
Win	2017	US Open	Hard	(United States) Madison Keys	6–3, 6–0
Loss	2018	French Open	Clay	(Romania) Simona Halep	6–3, 4–6, 1–6

== Other significant finals ==
=== Year-end championships ===
==== Singles: 1 (runner-up) ====
Result	Year	Championship	Surface	Opponent	Score
Loss	2018	WTA Finals, Singapore	Hard (i)	(Ukraine) Elina Svitolina	6–3, 2–6, 2–6

=== WTA 1000 tournaments ===
==== Singles: 2 (1 title, 1 runner-up) ====
Result	Year	Tournament	Surface	Opponent	Score
Win	2018	Miami Open	Hard	(Latvia) Jeļena Ostapenko	7–6^{(7–5)}, 6–1
Loss	2018	Canadian Open	Hard	(Romania) Simona Halep	6–7^{(6–8)}, 6–3, 4–6

== WTA Tour finals ==
=== Singles: 11 (8 titles, 3 runner-ups) ===
Legend Grand Slam (1–1) WTA Finals (0–1) WTA 1000 (1–1) WTA 500 (1–0) WTA 250 (5–0)	Finals by surface Hard (6–2) Clay (2–1) Grass (0–0) Carpet (0–0)

Result	W–L	Date	Tournament	Tier	Surface	Opponent	Score
Win	1–0	Aug 2015	Washington Open, United States	International (Note: The WTA International tournaments were reclassified as WTA 250 tournaments in 2021.)	Hard	(Russia) Anastasia Pavlyuchenkova	6–1, 6–2
Win	2–0	Jan 2016	Auckland Open, New Zealand	International	Hard	(Germany) Julia Görges	7–5, 6–2
Win	3–0	Feb 2016	Mexican Open, Mexico	International	Hard	(Slovakia) Dominika Cibulková	6–4, 4–6, 7–6^{(7–5)}
Win	4–0	Apr 2016	Charleston Open, United States	Premier (Note: The WTA Premier tournaments were reclassified as WTA 500 tournaments in 2021.)	Clay (green)	(Russia) Elena Vesnina	7–6^{(7–4)}, 6–2
Win	5–0	Sep 2017	US Open, United States	Grand Slam	Hard	(United States) Madison Keys	6–3, 6–0
Win	6–0	Mar 2018	Miami Open, United States	Premier M (Note: The WTA Premier 5 & Mandatory tournaments were reclassified as WTA 1000 tournaments in 2021.)	Hard	(Latvia) Jeļena Ostapenko	7–6^{(7–5)}, 6–1
Loss	6–1	Jun 2018	French Open, France	Grand Slam	Clay	(Romania) Simona Halep	6–3, 4–6, 1–6
Loss	6–2	Aug 2018	Canadian Open, Canada	Premier 5	Hard	(Romania) Simona Halep	6–7^{(6–8)}, 6–3, 4–6
Loss	6–3	Oct 2018	WTA Finals, Singapore	WTA Finals	Hard (i)	(Ukraine) Elina Svitolina	6–3, 2–6, 2–6
Win	7–3	Feb 2022	Abierto Zapopan, Mexico	WTA 250	Hard	(Czech Republic) Marie Bouzková	7–5, 1–6, 6–2
Win	8–3	Apr 2024	Open de Rouen, France	WTA 250	Clay (i)	(Poland) Magda Linette	6–1, 2–6, 6–2

=== Doubles: 2 (1 title, 1 runner-up) ===
Legend Grand Slam (0–0) WTA 1000 (0–0) WTA 500 (1–0) WTA 250 (0–1)	Finals by surface Hard (0–1) Clay (1–0) Grass (0–0) Carpet (0–0)

Result	W–L	Date	Tournament	Tier	Surface	Partner	Opponents	Score
Loss	0–1	Aug 2017	Washington Open, United States	International	Hard	(Canada) Eugenie Bouchard	(Japan) Shuko Aoyama (Czech Republic) Renata Voráčová	3–6, 2–6
Win	1–1	Apr 2024	Charleston Open, United States	WTA 500	Clay (green)	(United States) Ashlyn Krueger	(Ukraine) Lyudmyla Kichenok (Ukraine) Nadiia Kichenok	1–6, 6–3, [10–7]

== National representation ==
=== Fed Cup participation ===
Current through the 2020 Fed Cup qualifying round.

Group membership World Group / Finals (3–3) World Group play-offs (4–3) World Group 2 (1–0)	Matches by surface Hard (5–6) Clay (3–0)	Matches by type Singles (7–5) Doubles (1–1)	Matches by location United States (4–3) Away (4–3)

==== Singles (7–5) ====
Edition	Round	Date	Location	Opponent nation	Surface	Opponent player	W/L	Score
2013	WG PO	Apr 2013	Delray Beach (USA)	Sweden	Hard	Sofia Arvidsson	L	4–6, 6–4, 1–6
2014	WG PO	Apr 2014	St. Louis (USA)	France	Hard (i)	Caroline Garcia	L	3–6, 2–6
2014	WG PO	Apr 2014	St. Louis (USA)	France	Hard (i)	Virginie Razzano	W	6–2, 6–4
2016	WG2	Feb 2016	Kailua-Kona (USA)	Poland	Hard	Magda Linette	W	6–2, 6–4
2017	WG F	Nov 2017	Minsk (BLR)	Belarus	Hard (i)	Aryna Sabalenka	L	3–6, 6–3, 4–6
2017	WG F	Nov 2017	Minsk (BLR)	Belarus	Hard (i)	Aliaksandra Sasnovich	L	6–4, 1–6, 6–8
2018	WG SF	Apr 2018	Aix-en-Provence (FRA)	France	Clay (i)	Pauline Parmentier	W	7–6^{(7–3)}, 7–5
2018	WG SF	Apr 2018	Aix-en-Provence (FRA)	France	Clay (i)	Kristina Mladenovic	W	6–2, 6–0
2019	WG PO	Apr 2019	San Antonio (USA)	Switzerland	Hard (i)	Timea Bacsinszky	W	6–4, 6–3
2019	WG PO	Apr 2019	San Antonio (USA)	Switzerland	Hard (i)	Viktorija Golubic	W	6–3, 6–2
2020–21	F RR	Nov 2021	Prague (CZE)	Spain	Hard (i)	Nuria Párrizas Díaz	W	6–4, 6–4
2020–21	F SF	Nov 2021	Prague (CZE)	Russia	Hard (i)	Liudmila Samsonova	L	6–1, 4–6, 3–6

==== Doubles (1–1) ====
Edition	Round	Date	Location	Opponent nation	Surface	Partner	Opponent players	W/L	Score
2012	WG PO	Apr 2013	Kharkiv (UKR)	Ukraine	Clay	Liezel Huber	Lyudmyla Kichenok; Nadiia Kichenok	W	6–4, 6–1
2014	WG PO	Apr 2014	St. Louis (USA)	France	Hard (i)	Madison Keys	Caroline Garcia; Virginie Razzano	L	2–6, 5–7

== WTA Challenger finals ==
=== Singles: 1 (title) ===
Result	W–L	Date	Tournament	Surface	Opponent	Score
Win	1–0	May 2023	Open de Saint-Malo, France	Clay	(Belgium) Greet Minnen	6–3, 6–4

== ITF Circuit finals ==
=== Singles: 3 (2 titles, 1 runner-up) ===
Legend $100,000 tournaments (1–0) $60,000 tournaments (1–0) $25,000 tournaments (0–1)	Finals by surface Hard (1–0) Clay (1–1)

Result	W–L	Date	Tournament	Tier	Surface	Opponent	Score
Loss	0–1	May 2010	ITF Caserta, Italy	25,000	Clay	(Switzerland) Romina Oprandi	3–6, 3–6
Win	1–1	May 2011	ITF Reggio Emilia, Italy	50,000	Clay	(Belarus) Anastasya Yakimova	6–3, 6–1
Win	2–1	Oct 2026	Edmond Open, United States	100,000	Hard	Kristina Liutova	6–3, 6–2

== Junior Grand Slam tournament finals ==
=== Doubles: 4 (3-1) ===
Result	Year	Tournament	Surface	Partner	Opponents	Score
Loss	2008	US Open	Hard	(United States) Mallory Burdette	(Thailand) Noppawan Lertcheewakarn (Sweden) Sandra Roma	0–6, 2–6
Win	2010	French Open	Clay	(Hungary) Tímea Babos	(Spain) Lara Arruabarrena-Vecino (Spain) María-Teresa Torró-Flor	6–2, 6–3
Win	2010	Wimbledon	Grass	(Hungary) Tímea Babos	(Russia) Irina Khromacheva (Ukraine) Elina Svitolina	6–7^{(7–9)}, 6–2, 6–2
Win	2010	US Open	Hard	(Hungary) Tímea Babos	(Belgium) An-Sophie Mestach (Croatia) Silvia Njirić	w/o

== WTA Tour career earnings ==
As of 15 November 2021

Year	Grand Slam singles titles	WTA singles titles	Total singles titles	Earnings ($)	Money list rank
2012	0	0	0	419,725	49
2013	0	0	0	1,498,608	15
2014	0	0	0	704,947	38
2015	0	1	1	767,723	41
2016	0	3	3	578,259	59
2017	1	0	1	4,098,941	5
2018	0	1	1	5,068,099	6
2019	0	0	0	1,804,819	22
2020	0	0	0	378,083	56
2021	0	0	0	754,378	43
2021	0	0	0	754,378	43
2022	0	1	1	910,277	
Career	1	6	7	17,233,760	26

== Career Grand Slam statistics ==
=== Seedings ===
The tournaments won by Stephens are in boldface, and advanced into finals by Stephens are in italics.

Year	Australian Open	French Open	Wimbledon	US Open
2008	did not play	did not play	did not play	did not qualify
2009	did not play	did not play	did not play	did not qualify
2010	did not play	did not play	did not play	did not qualify
2011	did not qualify	qualifier	did not qualify	wild card
2012	not seeded	not seeded	not seeded	not seeded
2013	29th	17th	17th	15th
2014	13th	15th	18th	21st
2015	not seeded	not seeded	not seeded	29th
2016	24th	19th	18th	did not play
2017	did not play	did not play	protected ranking	**protected ranking (1)**
2018	13th	10th (1)	4th	3rd
2019	5th	7th	9th	11th
2020	24th	29th	cancelled	26th
2021	not seeded	not seeded	not seeded	not seeded
2022	not seeded	not seeded	not seeded	not seeded
2023	not seeded	not seeded	not seeded	not seeded
2024	not seeded	not seeded	not seeded	not seeded
2025	not seeded	did not play	did not play	did not play
2026	not seeded	not seeded	did not play	

=== Best Grand Slam results details ===
Australian Open
2013 Australian Open (29th seed)
Round	Opponent	Rank	Score
1R	(Romania) Simona Halep	45	6–1, 6–1
2R	(France) Kristina Mladenovic	98	6–4, 6–3
3R	(United Kingdom) Laura Robson	53	7–5, 6–3
4R	(Serbia) Bojana Jovanovski	56	6–1, 3–6, 7–5
QF	(United States) Serena Williams (3)	**3**	3–6, 7–5, 6–4
SF	(Belarus) **Victoria Azarenka** (1)	**1**	1–6, 4–6

French Open
2018 French Open (10th seed)
Round	Opponent	Rank	Score
1R	(Netherlands) Arantxa Rus (LL)	106	6–2, 6–0
2R	(Poland) Magdalena Fręch (Q)	136	6–2, 6–2
3R	(Italy) Camila Giorgi	57	4–6, 6–1, 8–6
4R	(Estonia) Anett Kontaveit (25)	24	6–2, 6–0
QF	(Russia) Daria Kasatkina (14)	14	6–3, 6–1
SF	(United States) Madison Keys (13)	13	6–4, 6–4
F	(Romania) **Simona Halep** (1)	**1**	6–3, 4–6, 1–6

Wimbledon
2013 Wimbledon (17th seed)
Round	Opponent	Rank	Score
1R	(United States) Jamie Hampton	25	6–3, 6–3
2R	(Germany) Andrea Petkovic (WC)	72	7–6^{(7–2)}, 2–6, 8–6
3R	(Czech Republic) Petra Cetkovská (Q)	196	7–6^{(7–3)}, 0–6, 6–4
4R	(Puerto Rico) Monica Puig	65	4–6, 7–5, 6–1
QF	(France) **Marion Bartoli** (15)	15	4–6, 5–7

US Open
2017 US Open (protected ranking)
Round	Opponent	Rank	Score
1R	(Italy) Roberta Vinci	47	7–5, 6–1
2R	(Slovakia) Dominika Cibulková (11)	**10**	6–2, 5–7, 6–3
3R	(Australia) Ashleigh Barty	43	6–2, 6–4
4R	(Germany) Julia Görges (30)	33	6–3, 3–6, 6–3
QF	(Latvia) Anastasija Sevastova (16)	17	6–3, 3–6, 7–6^{(7–4)}
SF	(United States) Venus Williams (9)	**9**	6–1, 0–6, 7–5
**W**	(United States) Madison Keys (15)	16	6–3, 6–0

== Top 10 wins ==
Season	2013	2014	2015	2016	2017	2018	...	2021	2022	2023	Total
Wins	2	0	3	1	3	8		2	1	1	21

#	Opponent	Rk	Event	Surface	Rd	Score	SRk	Ref
2013
1.	(United States) Serena Williams	3	Australian Open, Australia	Hard	QF	3–6, 7–5, 6–4	25	
2.	(Russia) Maria Sharapova	3	Cincinnati Open, US	Hard	2R	2–6, 7–6^{(7–5)}, 6–3	17	
2015
3.	(Spain) Carla Suárez Navarro	9	Eastbourne International, UK	Grass	2R	6–1, 7–5	43	
4.	(Spain) Carla Suárez Navarro	10	Cincinnati Open, US	Hard	1R	6–1, 6–2	30	
5.	(Czech Republic) Karolína Plíšková	9	China Open, China	Hard	1R	6–3, 6–2	29	
2016
6.	(Germany) Angelique Kerber	2	Charleston Open, US	Clay	SF	6–1, 3–0 ret.	25	
2017
7.	(Germany) Angelique Kerber	3	Canadian Open, Canada	Hard	3R	6–2, 6–2	934	
8.	(Slovakia) Dominika Cibulková	10	US Open, US	Hard	2R	6–2, 5–7, 6–3	83	
9.	(United States) Venus Williams	9	US Open, US	Hard	SF	6–1, 0–6, 7–5	83	
2018
10.	(Spain) Garbiñe Muguruza	3	Miami Open, US	Hard	4R	6–3, 6–4	12	
11.	(Germany) Angelique Kerber	10	Miami Open, US	Hard	QF	6–1, 6–2	12	
12.	(Latvia) Jeļena Ostapenko	5	Miami Open, US	Hard	F	7–6^{(7–5)}, 6–1	12	
13.	(Ukraine) Elina Svitolina	5	Canadian Open, Canada	Hard	SF	6–3, 6–3	3	
14.	(Japan) Naomi Osaka	4	WTA Finals, Singapore	Hard (i)	RR	7–5, 4–6, 6–1	6	
15.	(Netherlands) Kiki Bertens	9	WTA Finals, Singapore	Hard (i)	RR	7–6^{(7–4)}, 2–6, 6–3	6	
16.	(Germany) Angelique Kerber	2	WTA Finals, Singapore	Hard (i)	RR	6–3, 6–3	6	
17.	(Czech Republic) Karolína Plíšková	8	WTA Finals, Singapore	Hard (i)	SF	0–6, 6–4, 6–1	6	
2021
18.	(Czech Republic) Karolína Plíšková	10	French Open, France	Clay	2R	7–5, 6–1	59	
19.	(Czech Republic) Petra Kvitová	10	Wimbledon, UK	Grass	1R	6–3, 6–4	73	
2022
20.	(France) Caroline Garcia	10	Guadalajara Open, Mexico	Hard	4R	7–6^{(8–6)}, 7–5	50	
2023
21.	(France) Caroline Garcia	6	Cincinnati Open, US	Hard	3R	4–6, 6–4, 6–4	38	

== Longest winning streaks ==
=== 8–match singles winning streak (2018) ===
#	Tournament	Category	Start date	Surface	Rd	Opponent	Rank	Score	SSR
–	Indian Wells Open, United States	Premier Mandatory	5 March 2018	Hard	3R	(Russia) Daria Kasatkina (20)	No. 19	4–6, 3–6	No. 13
–	Miami Open, United States	Premier Mandatory	19 March 2018	Hard	1R	bye			No. 12
1	Miami Open, United States	Premier Mandatory	19 March 2018	Hard	2R	(Australia) Ajla Tomljanović (WC)	No. 90	6–1, 6–3	No. 12
2	Miami Open, United States	Premier Mandatory	19 March 2018	Hard	3R	(Romania) Monica Niculescu (Q)	No. 70	6–7^{(1–7)}, 6–3, 4–0 ret.	No. 12
3	Miami Open, United States	Premier Mandatory	19 March 2018	Hard	4R	(Spain) Garbiñe Muguruza (3)	No. 3	6–3, 6–4	No. 12
4	Miami Open, United States	Premier Mandatory	19 March 2018	Hard	QF	(Germany) Angelique Kerber (10)	No. 10	6–1, 6–2	No. 12
5	Miami Open, United States	Premier Mandatory	19 March 2018	Hard	SF	(Belarus) Victoria Azarenka (WC)	No. 186	3–6, 6–2, 6–1	No. 12
6	Miami Open, United States	Premier Mandatory	19 March 2018	Hard	F	(Latvia) Jeļena Ostapenko (6)	No. 5	7–6^{(7–5)}, 6–1	No. 12
7	Fed Cup Semifinal, France	Team event	21 April 2018	Clay	–	(France) Pauline Parmentier	No. 122	7–6^{(7–3)}, 7–5	No. 9
8	Fed Cup Semifinal, France	Team event	21 April 2018	Clay	–	(France) Kristina Mladenovic	No. 20	6–2, 6–0	No. 9
–	Stuttgart Open, Germany	Premier	23 April 2018	Clay	1R	(United States) CoCo Vandeweghe (WC)	No. 16	1–6, 0–6	No. 9
