= 2021 Charleston Open =

The 2021 Charleston Open, a stop on the 2021 WTA Tour, was split into two consecutive tournaments by Charleston Tennis, LLC in order to add opportunities after tournament cancellations by the pandemic.

Listed in order of play:

- 2021 Volvo Car Open, an annual WTA 500 tennis tournament
- 2021 MUSC Health Women's Open, a WTA 250 tennis tournament created after several tournaments cancelled by the COVID-19 pandemic
