= 2016 Volvo Car Open – Doubles =

Event of the women's tennis tournament, the Volvo Car Open

Doubles
- 2016 Volvo Car Open

Final
- Champions: (France) Caroline Garcia (France) Kristina Mladenovic
- Runners-up: (United States) Bethanie Mattek-Sands (Czech Republic) Lucie Šafářová
- Score: 6–2, 7–5

Details
- Draw: 16
- Seeds: 4

Events
Singles	Doubles
← 2015 ·	Volvo Car Open	· 2017 →

Martina Hingis and Sania Mirza were the defending champions, but chose not to participate this year.
Caroline Garcia and Kristina Mladenovic won the title, defeating Bethanie Mattek-Sands and Lucie Šafářová in the final, 6–2, 7–5.

== Seeds ==
1. (United States) Bethanie Mattek-Sands / (Czech Republic) Lucie Šafářová (final)
2. (Czech Republic) Andrea Hlaváčková / (Czech Republic) Lucie Hradecká (first round)
3. (France) Caroline Garcia / (France) Kristina Mladenovic (champions)
4. (United States) Raquel Atawo / (United States) Abigail Spears (quarterfinals, retired)

== Draw ==
=== Key ===
- Q = Qualifier
- WC = Wild card
- LL = Lucky loser
- Alt = Alternate
- SE = Special exempt
- PR = Protected ranking
- ITF = ITF entry
- JE = Junior exempt
- w/o = Walkover
- r = Retired
- d = Defaulted
- SR = Special ranking

First round
1	(United States) B Mattek-Sands (Czech Republic) L Šafářová	6	6
(Slovenia) A Klepač (Slovenia) K Srebotnik	3	4
(Canada) G Dabrowski (Croatia) D Jurak	6	6
WC	(United States) M Keys (United States) S Stephens	2	3
4	(United States) R Atawo (United States) A Spears	6	6
(Spain) L Arruabarrena (Romania) R Olaru	3	2
WC	(United States) H Berg (United States) P Cline	3	0
(United States) V King (Russia) A Kudryavtseva	6	6
(Russia) D Kasatkina (Russia) E Vesnina	6^{4}	6	[10]
(Ukraine) K Bondarenko (Ukraine) O Savchuk	7^{7}	3	[6]
(Australia) C Dellacqua (Australia) S Stosur	5	4
3	(France) C Garcia (France) K Mladenovic	7	6
(Germany) A-L Grönefeld (Germany) L Siegemund	2	7^{7}	[11]
(Australia) An Rodionova (Czech Republic) K Siniaková	6	6^{4}	[9]
(Spain) A Medina Garrigues (Spain) A Parra Santonja	6	6
2	(Czech Republic) A Hlaváčková (Czech Republic) L Hradecká	4	2

Quarterfinals
1	(United States) B Mattek-Sands (Czech Republic) L Šafářová	6	7^{8}
(Canada) G Dabrowski (Croatia) D Jurak	3	6^{6}
4	(United States) R Atawo (United States) A Spears	4	2^{r}
(United States) V King (Russia) A Kudryavtseva	6	4
(Russia) D Kasatkina (Russia) E Vesnina	6	4	[8]
3	(France) C Garcia (France) K Mladenovic	2	6	[10]
(Germany) A-L Grönefeld (Germany) L Siegemund	1	6	[10]
(Spain) A Medina Garrigues (Spain) A Parra Santonja	6	3	[5]

Semifinals
1	(United States) B Mattek-Sands (Czech Republic) L Šafářová	6	3	[10]
(United States) V King (Russia) A Kudryavtseva	2	6	[4]
3	(France) C Garcia (France) K Mladenovic	6	6
(Germany) A-L Grönefeld (Germany) L Siegemund	4	3

Final
1	(United States) B Mattek-Sands (Czech Republic) L Šafářová	2	5
3	(France) C Garcia (France) K Mladenovic	6	7
