= 2016 Volvo Car Open – Singles =

Singles
- 2016 Volvo Car Open

Final
- Champion: (United States) Sloane Stephens
- Runner-up: (Russia) Elena Vesnina
- Score: 7–6^{(7–4)}, 6–2

Details
- Draw: 56
- Seeds: 16

Events
Singles	Doubles
- Volvo Car Open

Angelique Kerber was the defending champion, but retired in the semifinals against Sloane Stephens.

Stephens went on to win the title, defeating Elena Vesnina in the final, 7–6^{(7–4)}, 6–2. She saved a match point against Daria Kasatkina in the quarterfinals. Vesnina was the first qualifier in history to reach the final of this event.

== Seeds ==
The top eight seeds received a bye into the second round.

1. (Germany) Angelique Kerber (semifinals, retired due to a viral illness)
2. (Switzerland) Belinda Bencic (second round)
3. (United States) Venus Williams (third round)
4. (Czech Republic) Lucie Šafářová (second round)
5. (Italy) Sara Errani (semifinals)
6. (Germany) Andrea Petkovic (second round)
7. (United States) Sloane Stephens (champion)
8. (United States) Madison Keys (second round)
9. (Serbia) Jelena Janković (withdrew because of a right shoulder injury)
10. (Australia) Samantha Stosur (third round)
11. (France) Kristina Mladenovic (second round)
12. (Australia) Daria Gavrilova (third round)
13. (Romania) Irina-Camelia Begu (quarterfinals)
14. (Russia) Daria Kasatkina (quarterfinals)
15. (Germany) Sabine Lisicki (second round)
16. (Japan) Misaki Doi (first round)
17. (Canada) Eugenie Bouchard (second round, retired due to an abdominal injury)

Click on the seed number of a player to go to their draw section.

== Draw ==
Key

- Q = Qualifier
- WC = Wild card
- LL = Lucky loser
- Alt = Alternate
- ITF = ITF entry
- PR = Protected ranking
- SR = Special ranking
- SE = Special exempt
- JE = Junior exempt
- JR = Junior Accelerator Programme entrant
- CO = College Accelerator Programme entrant
- NG = Next Gen Accelerator Program entrant
- w/o = Walkover
- r = Retired
- d = Defaulted

=== Finals ===
Quarterfinals
1	(Germany) Angelique Kerber	6	6
13	(Romania) Irina-Camelia Begu	2	3
14	(Russia) Daria Kasatkina	1	7	5
7	(United States) Sloane Stephens	6	5	7
5	(Italy) Sara Errani	7^{7}	6
(Kazakhstan) Yulia Putintseva	6^{2}	1
(Germany) Laura Siegemund	5	4
Q	(Russia) Elena Vesnina	7	6

Semifinals
1	(Germany) Angelique Kerber	1	0^{r}
7	(United States) Sloane Stephens	6	3
5	(Italy) Sara Errani	4	6	2
Q	(Russia) Elena Vesnina	6	4	6

Final
7	(United States) Sloane Stephens	7^{7}	6
Q	(Russia) Elena Vesnina	6^{4}	2

=== Top half ===
==== Section 1 ====
First round
WC	(United States) S Rogers	4	6	4
(Spain) L Arruabarrena	6	3	6
(United States) M Brengle	5	2
Q	(Slovakia) K Kučová	7	6
(Ukraine) K Bondarenko	4	6	6
16	(Japan) M Doi	6	3	1
13	(Romania) I-C Begu	6	2	7^{7}
(France) C Garcia	4	6	6^{3}
(United States) B Mattek-Sands	5	6	6
(Brazil) T Pereira	7	3	2
(Czech Republic) L Hradecká	3	2
(Puerto Rico) M Puig	6	6

Second round
1	(Germany) A Kerber	6	5	7^{7}
(Spain) L Arruabarrena	2	7	6^{3}
Q	(Slovakia) K Kučová	0	6	6
(Ukraine) K Bondarenko	6	3	3
13	(Romania) I-C Begu	6	4	6
(United States) B Mattek-Sands	4	6	2
(Puerto Rico) M Puig	7	6
6	(Germany) A Petkovic	5	2

Third round
1	(Germany) A Kerber	6	6
Q	(Slovakia) K Kučová	2	3
13	(Romania) I-C Begu	1	6	7^{7}
(Puerto Rico) M Puig	6	2	6^{4}

Quarterfinals
1	(Germany) A Kerber	6	6
13	(Romania) I-C Begu	2	3

==== Section 2 ====
First round
Q	(Japan) N Osaka	6	1	1
WC	(United States) L Chirico	3	6	6
Q	(Bulgaria) S Karatantcheva	3	3
(Croatia) A Konjuh	6	6
(China) S Zheng	2	1
14	(Russia) D Kasatkina	6	6
12	(Australia) D Gavrilova	6	1	6
(Kazakhstan) Z Diyas	1	6	3
(China) S Zhang	6	6
Q	(Netherlands) L Kerkhove	1	2
(Montenegro) D Kovinić	6	6
Q	(Turkey) Ç Büyükakçay	1	3

Second round
4	(Czech Republic) L Šafářová	3	3
WC	(United States) L Chirico	6	6
(Croatia) A Konjuh	1	1
14	(Russia) D Kasatkina	6	6
12	(Australia) D Gavrilova	6	6
(China) S Zhang	4	0
(Montenegro) D Kovinić	4	3
7	(United States) S Stephens	6	6

Third round
WC	(United States) L Chirico	0	4
14	(Russia) D Kasatkina	6	6
12	(Australia) D Gavrilova	4	3
7	(United States) S Stephens	6	6

Quarterfinals
14	(Russia) D Kasatkina	1	7	5
7	(United States) S Stephens	6	5	7

=== Bottom half ===
==== Section 3 ====
First round
(Kazakhstan) Y Shvedova	6	6
(Russia) E Rodina	1	1
(Latvia) A Sevastova	6	4	1
LL	(Slovakia) J Čepelová	4	6	6
Q	(Serbia) A Krunić	4	4
10	(Australia) S Stosur	6	6
15	(Germany) S Lisicki	6	6
(United States) I Falconi	4	3
(Japan) K Nara	6^{4}	0
(Kazakhstan) Y Putintseva	7^{7}	6
WC	(United States) F Altick	3	2
(United States) A Riske	6	6

Second round
5	(Italy) S Errani	6	6
(Kazakhstan) Y Shvedova	0	3
LL	(Slovakia) J Čepelová	4	5
10	(Australia) S Stosur	6	7
15	(Germany) S Lisicki	5	6	3
(Kazakhstan) Y Putintseva	7	4	6
(United States) A Riske	4	2
3	(United States) V Williams	6	6

Third round
5	(Italy) S Errani	6	7^{7}
10	(Australia) S Stosur	4	6^{5}
(Kazakhstan) Y Putintseva	7^{7}	2	6
3	(United States) V Williams	6^{5}	6	4

Quarterfinals
5	(Italy) S Errani	7^{7}	6
(Kazakhstan) Y Putintseva	6^{2}	1

==== Section 4 ====
First round
(Germany) L Siegemund	4	6	6
LL	(Romania) PM Țig	6	3	3
(Croatia) M Lučić-Baroni	6	6
PR	(China) S Peng	2	1
(Germany) T Maria	4	3
11	(France) K Mladenovic	6	6
17	(Canada) E Bouchard	6	6
(Romania) A Dulgheru	3	4
(Spain) L Domínguez Lino	2	6	6
(United States) C McHale	6	4	1
Q	(Russia) E Vesnina	7	6
Q	(Netherlands) C Burger	5	2

Second round
8	(United States) M Keys	7^{7}	4	4
(Germany) L Siegemund	6^{3}	6	6
(Croatia) M Lučić-Baroni	4	6	7^{15}
11	(France) K Mladenovic	6	4	6^{13}
17	(Canada) E Bouchard	4	6	0^{r}
(Spain) L Domínguez Lino	6	1	1
Q	(Russia) E Vesnina	6	6
2	(Switzerland) B Bencic	1	1

Third round
(Germany) L Siegemund	7	6
(Croatia) M Lučić-Baroni	5	2
(Spain) L Domínguez Lino	1	3
Q	(Russia) E Vesnina	6	6

Quarterfinals
(Germany) L Siegemund	5	4
Q	(Russia) E Vesnina	7	6

== Qualifying ==
=== Seeds ===
1. (Russia) Elena Vesnina (qualified)
2. (Japan) Naomi Osaka (qualified)
3. (United States) Samantha Crawford (qualifying competition, withdrew)
4. (Czech Republic) Kateřina Siniaková (first round)
5. (United States) Anna Tatishvili (first round)
6. (China) Han Xinyun (first round)
7. (Turkey) Çağla Büyükakçay (qualified)
8. (Serbia) Aleksandra Krunić (qualified)
9. (Slovakia) Jana Čepelová (qualifying competition, lucky loser)
10. (Romania) Patricia Maria Țig (qualifying competition, lucky loser)
11. (Bulgaria) Sesil Karatantcheva (qualified)
12. (Slovakia) Kristína Kučová (qualified)
13. (Paraguay) Verónica Cepede Royg (first round)
14. (France) Alizé Lim (first round)
15. (United States) Jessica Pegula (first round)
16. (Belgium) Ysaline Bonaventure (qualifying competition)

=== Qualifiers ===
1. (Russia) Elena Vesnina
2. (Japan) Naomi Osaka
3. (Netherlands) Cindy Burger
4. (Bulgaria) Sesil Karatantcheva
5. (Slovakia) Kristína Kučová
6. (Netherlands) Lesley Kerkhove
7. (Turkey) Çağla Büyükakçay
8. (Serbia) Aleksandra Krunić

=== Lucky losers ===
1. (Slovakia) Jana Čepelová
2. (Romania) Patricia Maria Țig

=== Draw ===
==== First qualifier ====
First round
1	(Russia) Elena Vesnina	6	6
(Spain) Sílvia Soler Espinosa	4	0
(Spain) Sara Sorribes Tormo	2	6	7
15	(United States) Jessica Pegula	6	1	5

Qualifying competition
1	(Russia) Elena Vesnina	6	6
(Spain) Sara Sorribes Tormo	4	4

==== Second qualifier ====
First round
2	(Japan) Naomi Osaka	6	6
(Czech Republic) Tereza Martincová	0	2
WC	(United States) Ellie Halbauer	0	6	1
9	(Slovakia) Jana Čepelová	6	4	6

Qualifying competition
2	(Japan) Naomi Osaka	6	7^{9}
9	(Slovakia) Jana Čepelová	4	6^{7}

==== Third qualifier ====
First round
3	(United States) Samantha Crawford	6	1	6
WC	(Switzerland) Patty Schnyder	2	6	2
(Netherlands) Cindy Burger	6	2	7
13	(Paraguay) Verónica Cepede Royg	4	6	5

Qualifying competition
3	(United States) Samantha Crawford
(Netherlands) Cindy Burger	w/o

==== Fourth qualifier ====
First round
4	(Czech Republic) Kateřina Siniaková	6	4	2
WC	(United States) Raveena Kingsley	4	6	6
(Czech Republic) Andrea Hlaváčková	6	6^{5}	3
11	(Bulgaria) Sesil Karatantcheva	4	7^{7}	6

Qualifying competition
WC	(United States) Raveena Kingsley	0	5
11	(Bulgaria) Sesil Karatantcheva	6	7

==== Fifth qualifier ====
First round
5	(United States) Anna Tatishvili	6	0	5
PR	(Portugal) Michelle Larcher de Brito	2	6	7
(Switzerland) Amra Sadiković	3	0
12	(Slovakia) Kristína Kučová	6	6

Qualifying competition
PR	(Portugal) Michelle Larcher de Brito	1	5
12	(Slovakia) Kristína Kučová	6	7

==== Sixth qualifier ====
First round
6	(China) Han Xinyun	3	7	4
(Netherlands) Lesley Kerkhove	6	5	6
WC	(United Kingdom) Laura Robson	3	3
10	(Romania) Patricia Maria Țig	6	6

Qualifying competition
(Netherlands) Lesley Kerkhove	1	6	6
10	(Romania) Patricia Maria Țig	6	3	4

==== Seventh qualifier ====
First round
7	(Turkey) Çağla Büyükakçay	7^{7}	1	7^{9}
(United States) Julia Boserup	6^{1}	6	6^{7}
(Russia) Alla Kudryavtseva	3	6^{0}
16	(Belgium) Ysaline Bonaventure	6	7^{7}

Qualifying competition
7	(Turkey) Çağla Büyükakçay	7	6
16	(Belgium) Ysaline Bonaventure	5	1

==== Eighth qualifier ====
First round
8	(Serbia) Aleksandra Krunić	3	6	6
PR	(United States) Melanie Oudin	6	0	3
(Serbia) Jovana Jakšić	6	6
14	(France) Alizé Lim	1	3

Qualifying competition
8	(Serbia) Aleksandra Krunić	6	6
(Serbia) Jovana Jakšić	0	2
