= 2017 Volvo Car Open – Singles =

Singles
- 2017 Volvo Car Open

Final
- Champion: (Russia) Daria Kasatkina
- Runner-up: (Latvia) Jeļena Ostapenko
- Score: 6–3, 6–1

Details
- Draw: 56
- Seeds: 16

Events
Singles	Doubles
- Charleston Open

Sloane Stephens was the defending champion, but did not participate this year as she was recovering from foot surgery.

Daria Kasatkina won her first WTA Tour title, defeating Jeļena Ostapenko in the final, 6–3, 6–1. This was the first final between two teenage players on the WTA tour since Yanina Wickmayer defeated Petra Kvitová at the 2009 Linz tournament.

== Seeds ==
The top eight seeds received a bye into the second round.

1. (United States) Madison Keys (second round)
2. (United Kingdom) Johanna Konta (withdrew due to a right shoulder injury)
3. (United States) Venus Williams (second round)
4. (Russia) Elena Vesnina (second round)
5. (Denmark) Caroline Wozniacki (quarterfinals)
6. (Australia) Samantha Stosur (third round)
7. (Netherlands) Kiki Bertens (third round)
8. (Latvia) Anastasija Sevastova (quarterfinals)

9. (Australia) Daria Gavrilova (third round)
10. (Romania) Irina-Camelia Begu (quarterfinals)
11. (Croatia) Mirjana Lučić-Baroni (semifinals)
12. (Kazakhstan) Yulia Putintseva (first round)
13. (China) Zhang Shuai (second round)
14. (United States) Lauren Davis (first round)
15. (Czech Republic) Lucie Šafářová (third round)
16. (Czech Republic) Kateřina Siniaková (first round, retired)

Click on the seed number of a player to go to their draw section.

== Draw ==
Key

- Q = Qualifier
- WC = Wild card
- LL = Lucky loser
- Alt = Alternate
- ITF = ITF entry
- PR = Protected ranking
- SR = Special ranking
- SE = Special exempt
- JE = Junior exempt
- JR = Junior Accelerator Programme entrant
- CO = College Accelerator Programme entrant
- NG = Next Gen Accelerator Program entrant
- w/o = Walkover
- r = Retired
- d = Defaulted

=== Finals ===
Quarterfinals
(United States) Shelby Rogers	7^{9}	1	1
11	(Croatia) Mirjana Lučić-Baroni	6^{7}	6	6
(Latvia) Jeļena Ostapenko	6	6
5	(Denmark) Caroline Wozniacki	2	4
8	(Latvia) Anastasija Sevastova	2	4
(Germany) Laura Siegemund	6	6
10	(Romania) Irina-Camelia Begu	4	1
(Russia) Daria Kasatkina	6	6

Semifinals
11	(Croatia) Mirjana Lučić-Baroni	3	7	4
(Latvia) Jeļena Ostapenko	6	5	6
(Germany) Laura Siegemund	6	2	1
(Russia) Daria Kasatkina	3	6	6

Final
(Latvia) Jeļena Ostapenko	3	1
(Russia) Daria Kasatkina	6	6

=== Top half ===
==== Section 1 ====
First round
Q	(Paraguay) V Cepede Royg	7^{7}	3	6^{6}
(United States) S Rogers	6^{1}	6	7^{8}
(Japan) N Osaka	6^{4}	6	6
(Sweden) J Larsson	7^{7}	4	2
(Japan) M Doi	2	1
13	(China) S Zhang	6	6
11	(Croatia) M Lučić-Baroni	6	4	6
Q	(Serbia) A Krunić	1	6	3
(United States) J Brady	5	4
(Germany) M Barthel	7	6
(Ukraine) K Bondarenko	6	7
(Russia) E Rodina	4	5

Second round
1	(United States) M Keys	6	1	1
(United States) S Rogers	4	6	6
(Japan) N Osaka	6	6
13	(China) S Zhang	4	4
11	(Croatia) M Lučić-Baroni	6	6
(Germany) M Barthel	3	2
(Ukraine) K Bondarenko	2	5
7	(Netherlands) K Bertens	6	7

Third round
(United States) S Rogers	6	6
(Japan) N Osaka	4	2
11	(Croatia) M Lučić-Baroni	7^{7}	6
7	(Netherlands) K Bertens	6^{5}	4

Quarterfinals
(United States) S Rogers	7^{8}	1	1
11	(Croatia) M Lučić-Baroni	6^{6}	6	6

==== Section 2 ====
First round
Q	(United States) A Muhammad	3	5
Q	(Hungary) F Stollár	6	7
Q	(Romania) A Bogdan	4	2
(Latvia) J Ostapenko	6	6
(Greece) M Sakkari	7	6
14	(United States) L Davis	5	4
LL	(United States) G Min	1	1
(Italy) S Errani	6	6
(China) Y Duan	6^{3}	1
Q	(Australia) An Rodionova	7^{7}	6
(United States) L Chirico	0	0^{r}
(Germany) A Beck	6	3

Second round
4	(Russia) E Vesnina	6^{7}	6^{3}
Q	(Hungary) F Stollár	7^{9}	7^{7}
(Latvia) J Ostapenko	6	4	6
(Greece) M Sakkari	2	6	2
(Italy) S Errani	2	2
Q	(Australia) An Rodionova	6	6
(Germany) A Beck	5	1
5	(Denmark) C Wozniacki	7	6

Third round
Q	(Hungary) F Stollár	1	0^{r}
(Latvia) J Ostapenko	6	1
Q	(Australia) An Rodionova	3	3
5	(Denmark) C Wozniacki	6	6

Quarterfinals
(Latvia) J Ostapenko	6	6
5	(Denmark) C Wozniacki	2	4

=== Bottom half ===
==== Section 3 ====
First round
(Spain) L Arruabarrena	5	2
(Germany) A Petkovic	7	6
(New Zealand) M Erakovic	4	1
LL	(Tunisia) O Jabeur	6	6
(Poland) M Linette	4	6	6
12	(Kazakhstan) Y Putintseva	6	2	4
15	(Czech Republic) L Šafářová	7	6^{6}	6
(United States) V Lepchenko	5	7^{8}	3
Q	(United States) S Kenin	4	4
WC	(United States) B Mattek-Sands	6	6
(Ukraine) L Tsurenko	7^{8}	2	6^{4}
(Germany) L Siegemund	6^{6}	6	7^{7}

Second round
8	(Latvia) A Sevastova	6	6
(Germany) A Petkovic	3	4
LL	(Tunisia) O Jabeur	6	6
(Poland) M Linette	4	4
15	(Czech Republic) L Šafářová	6	6
WC	(United States) B Mattek-Sands	3	3
(Germany) L Siegemund	6	6^{3}	7
3	(United States) V Williams	4	7^{7}	5

Third round
8	(Latvia) A Sevastova	7	7^{8}
LL	(Tunisia) O Jabeur	5	6^{6}
15	(Czech Republic) L Šafářová	2	3
(Germany) L Siegemund	6	6

Quarterfinals
8	(Latvia) A Sevastova	2	4
(Germany) L Siegemund	6	6

==== Section 4 ====
First round
(Serbia) J Janković	6	6
(Russia) E Alexandrova	0	4
(Slovakia) K Kučová	5	7	7^{7}
Q	(Spain) S Soler Espinosa	7	5	6^{2}
(Turkey) Ç Büyükakçay	0	0
10	(Romania) I-C Begu	6	6
16	(Czech Republic) K Siniaková	6	2	1^{r}
(Puerto Rico) M Puig	4	6	4
(Russia) D Kasatkina	6	6
(Montenegro) D Kovinić	1	2
WC	(United States) K Day	5	6	0
(United States) A Riske	7	4	6

Second round
6	(Australia) S Stosur	6	6
(Serbia) J Janković	1	3
(Slovakia) K Kučová	6	2	6^{6}
10	(Romania) I-C Begu	4	6	7^{8}
(Puerto Rico) M Puig	0	7^{7}	2
(Russia) D Kasatkina	6	6^{3}	6
(United States) A Riske	3	1
9	(Australia) D Gavrilova	6	6

Third round
6	(Australia) S Stosur	5	3
10	(Romania) I-C Begu	7	6
(Russia) D Kasatkina	6	4	6
9	(Australia) D Gavrilova	3	6	0

Quarterfinals
10	(Romania) I-C Begu	4	1
(Russia) D Kasatkina	6	6

== Qualifying ==
=== Seeds ===
1. (United States) Taylor Townsend (first round)
2. (Spain) Sílvia Soler Espinosa (qualified)
3. (Romania) Ana Bogdan (qualified)
4. (Serbia) Aleksandra Krunić (qualified)
5. (Tunisia) Ons Jabeur (qualifying competition, lucky loser)
6. (United States) Grace Min (qualifying competition, lucky loser)
7. (Paraguay) Verónica Cepede Royg (qualified)
8. (United States) Sachia Vickery (first round)
9. (United States) Asia Muhammad (qualified)
10. (Czech Republic) Lucie Hradecká (first round)
11. (United States) Samantha Crawford (first round)
12. (Netherlands) Cindy Burger (first round)
13. (Brazil) Teliana Pereira (first round)
14. (Paraguay) Montserrat González (first round)
15. (Bulgaria) Sesil Karatantcheva (qualifying competition)
16. (Switzerland) Jil Teichmann (first round)

=== Qualifiers ===
1. (United States) Sofia Kenin
2. (Spain) Sílvia Soler Espinosa
3. (Romania) Ana Bogdan
4. (Serbia) Alexandra Krunić
5. (United States) Asia Muhammad
6. (Hungary) Fanny Stollár
7. (Paraguay) Verónica Cepede Royg
8. (Australia) Anastasia Rodionova

=== Lucky losers ===
1. (Tunisia) Ons Jabeur
2. (United States) Grace Min

=== Draw ===
==== First qualifier ====
First round
1	(United States) Taylor Townsend	4	3
(United States) Sofia Kenin	6	6
(France) Fiona Ferro	4	6	7^{7}
14	(Paraguay) Montserrat González	6	0	6^{4}

Qualifying competition
(United States) Sofia Kenin	7	6
(France) Fiona Ferro	5	2

==== Second qualifier ====
First round
2	(Spain) Sílvia Soler Espinosa	7	6
(United States) Jennifer Elie	5	1
(Croatia) Tena Lukas	6	6
11	(United States) Samantha Crawford	1	1

Qualifying competition
2	(Spain) Sílvia Soler Espinosa	7^{7}	6
(Croatia) Tena Lukas	6^{3}	3

==== Third qualifier ====
First round
3	(Romania) Ana Bogdan	6	6
(Canada) Aleksandra Wozniak	1	0
PR	(Romania) Alexandra Dulgheru	6	6
10	(Czech Republic) Lucie Hradecká	2	3

Qualifying competition
3	(Romania) Ana Bogdan	1	6	6
PR	(Romania) Alexandra Dulgheru	6	0	4

==== Fourth qualifier ====
First round
4	(Serbia) Aleksandra Krunić	6	6
(United States) Elizabeth Halbauer	2	2
(Czech Republic) Jesika Malečková	2	6	7^{8}
12	(Netherlands) Cindy Burger	6	4	6^{6}

Qualifying competition
4	(Serbia) Aleksandra Krunić	3	6	7^{7}
(Czech Republic) Jesika Malečková	6	3	6^{5}

==== Fifth qualifier ====
First round
5	(Tunisia) Ons Jabeur	w/o
(Czech Republic) Andrea Hlaváčková
(Croatia) Darija Jurak	4	0
9	(United States) Asia Muhammad	6	6

Qualifying competition
5	(Tunisia) Ons Jabeur	4	2
9	(United States) Asia Muhammad	6	6

==== Sixth qualifier ====
First round
6	(United States) Grace Min	6	7
WC	(United States) Michaela Gordon	3	5
(Hungary) Fanny Stollár	6	6
13	(Brazil) Teliana Pereira	1	0

Qualifying competition
6	(United States) Grace Min	6	2	4
(Hungary) Fanny Stollár	4	6	6

==== Seventh qualifier ====
First round
7	(Paraguay) Verónica Cepede Royg	6	6
(United States) Caroline Dolehide	3	3
(United Kingdom) Amanda Carreras	7	6
16	(Switzerland) Jil Teichmann	5	2

Qualifying competition
7	(Paraguay) Verónica Cepede Royg	2	7^{11}	6
(United Kingdom) Amanda Carreras	6	6^{9}	4

==== Eighth qualifier ====
First round
8	(United States) Sachia Vickery	3	3
(Australia) Anastasia Rodionova	6	6
WC	(United States) Cameron Morra	4	3
15	(Bulgaria) Sesil Karatantcheva	6	6

Qualifying competition
(Australia) Anastasia Rodionova	7	6
15	(Bulgaria) Sesil Karatantcheva	5	2
