= Charleston Place =

Hotel in Charleston, South Carolina, US

The Charleston Place

General information
- Location: 205 Meeting Street, Charleston, South Carolina 29401, USA
- Coordinates: 32.78112°N 79.93226°W
- Opening: September 2, 1986
- Operator: Beemok Hospitality Collection

Other information
- Number of rooms: 434

Website
- Official website

The Charleston Place is a hotel in the historic center of Charleston, South Carolina. It was built in a style to fit with the architecture of surrounding 1800s buildings and opened on September 2, 1986. It is the largest hotel in Charleston at 434 rooms.

The “Quadriga” sculpture in the fountain at the front entrance (between Meeting and Hasell Street) is by John W. Mills, a member of the Royal Society of British Sculptors and the Royal Society of Arts. Its four 9-foot bronze horses represent the significance of the horse in Charleston’s history, as well as its present-day role. At the top of the sculpture is a Carolina bird of prey.

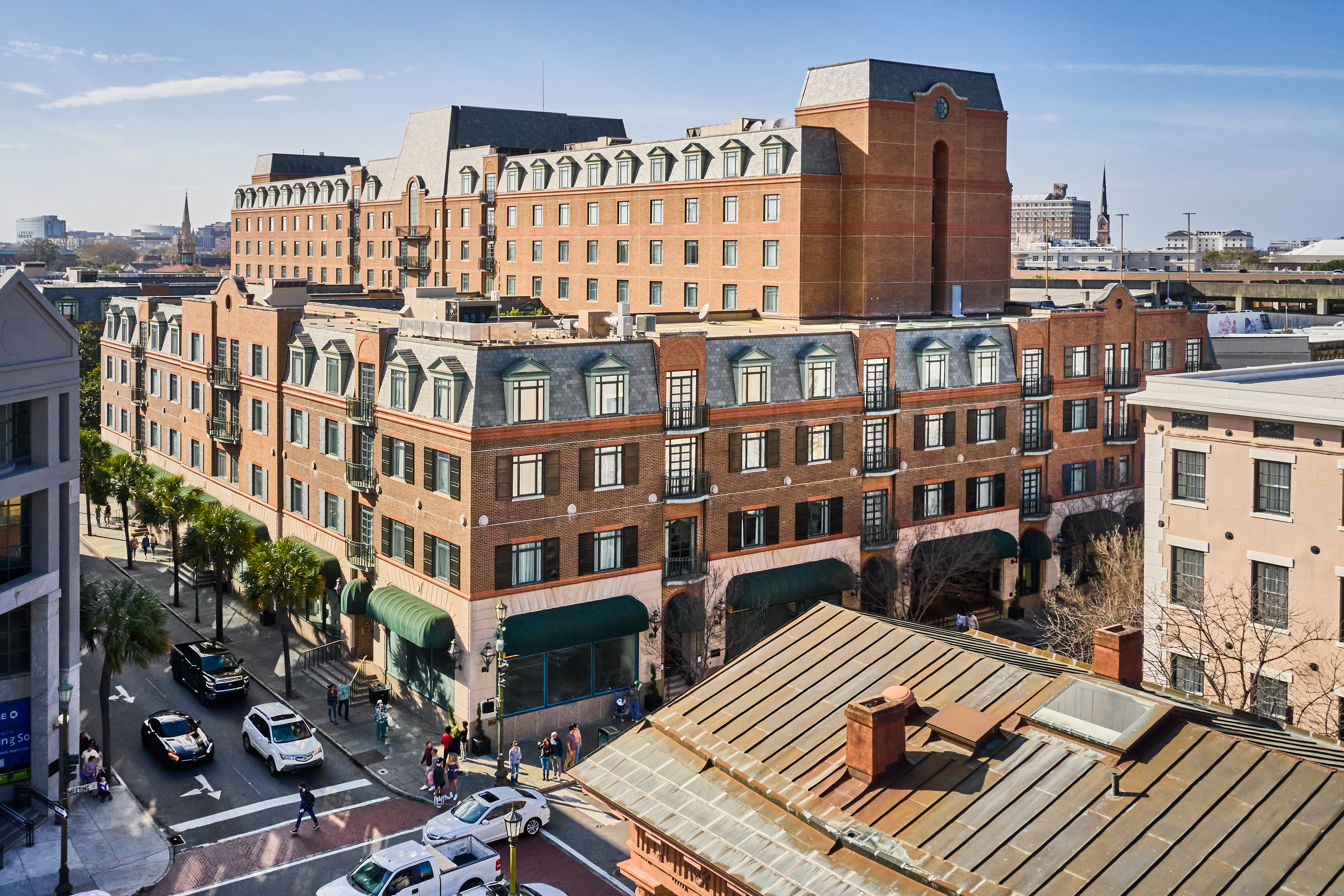
The Charleston Place

The adjacent Art Deco Riviera Theatre is owned by The Charleston Place and is a National Historic Landmark within the Charleston Historic District. Built in 1939, it was one of the first movie theaters in the city. Acquired by Beemok Hospitality Collection in 2021, The Riviera reopened to the public for the first time in 45 years.

The lobby of the hotel features a hand-blown Venetian chandelier set between a Georgian open arm staircase. At 12 feet in diameter and in height, the chandelier is made of more than 3,000 individual pieces of glass, hand blown in Murano, Italy. It weighs approximately two and one-half tons.

In 1995, Orient-Express Hotels acquired the hotel and in 2014, the company changed its name to Belmond Ltd. At that time the hotel was renamed The Charleston Place.

== Ownership ==
In October 2021, the hotel was acquired by Beemok Hospitality Collection. In addition to Charleston Place, Beemok's Charleston-area properties include the Credit One Stadium, Sorelle, The Riviera, and The Cooper.
