= Credit One Bank =

American bank

Credit One Bank, N.A.
- Type: Private
- Industry: Financial services
- Founded: 1984; 42 years ago, in San Rafael, California
- Headquarters: Las Vegas, Nevada
- Key people: Ben Navarro (owner), Robert DeJong (CEO)
- Products: Credit cards CDs; Savings accounts
- Revenue: US$1.522 billion (2023)
- Net income: US$453 million (2023)
- Total assets: US$1.616 billion (2024)
- Owner: Sherman Financial Group
- Website: www.creditonebank.com

Credit One Bank, N.A. is a bank specializing in credit cards (including cards for borrowers with low credit scores), certificates of deposit, and savings accounts. The bank is owned by Sherman Financial Group and is headquartered in Las Vegas, Nevada.

Founded as the First National Bank of Marin in 1984, the bank rebranded as Credit One Bank in 2006, which saw the creation of its logo, a swoosh above the bank's name. In 2008, Capital One, another banking institution, underwent its own rebrand, featuring a "nearly identical" logo. Despite similar branding, Credit One is not affiliated with Capital One.

== History ==
The bank was founded on July 30, 1984, as First National Bank of Marin in San Rafael, California. It received the designation of "credit card bank" in June 1996. In November 1998, the bank moved from San Rafael to Las Vegas, Nevada. At that time, the bank was owned by Kjell Qvale.

In 2005, the bank was acquired by Sherman Financial Group, a diversified investment services company founded by Ben Navarro which runs one of the largest buyers of consumer debt in the United States. On February 1, 2006, FNBM changed its name to Credit One Bank, N.A. In that same year, the bank continued its rebrand by changing its logo to have an arcing "swoosh" above the name of the bank. Capital One underwent a similar rebrand in 2008, displaying a "nearly identical" logo to Credit One, leading to confusion among consumers. Marketing by Capital One led to an increase in customers for both itself and Credit One, some of whom were unaware that the two were different companies.

The bank moved its headquarters to a new facility in 2018 which was expanded in 2021 to include a second building of 150,000 square feet (14,000 m^{2}).

=== Sponsorships ===
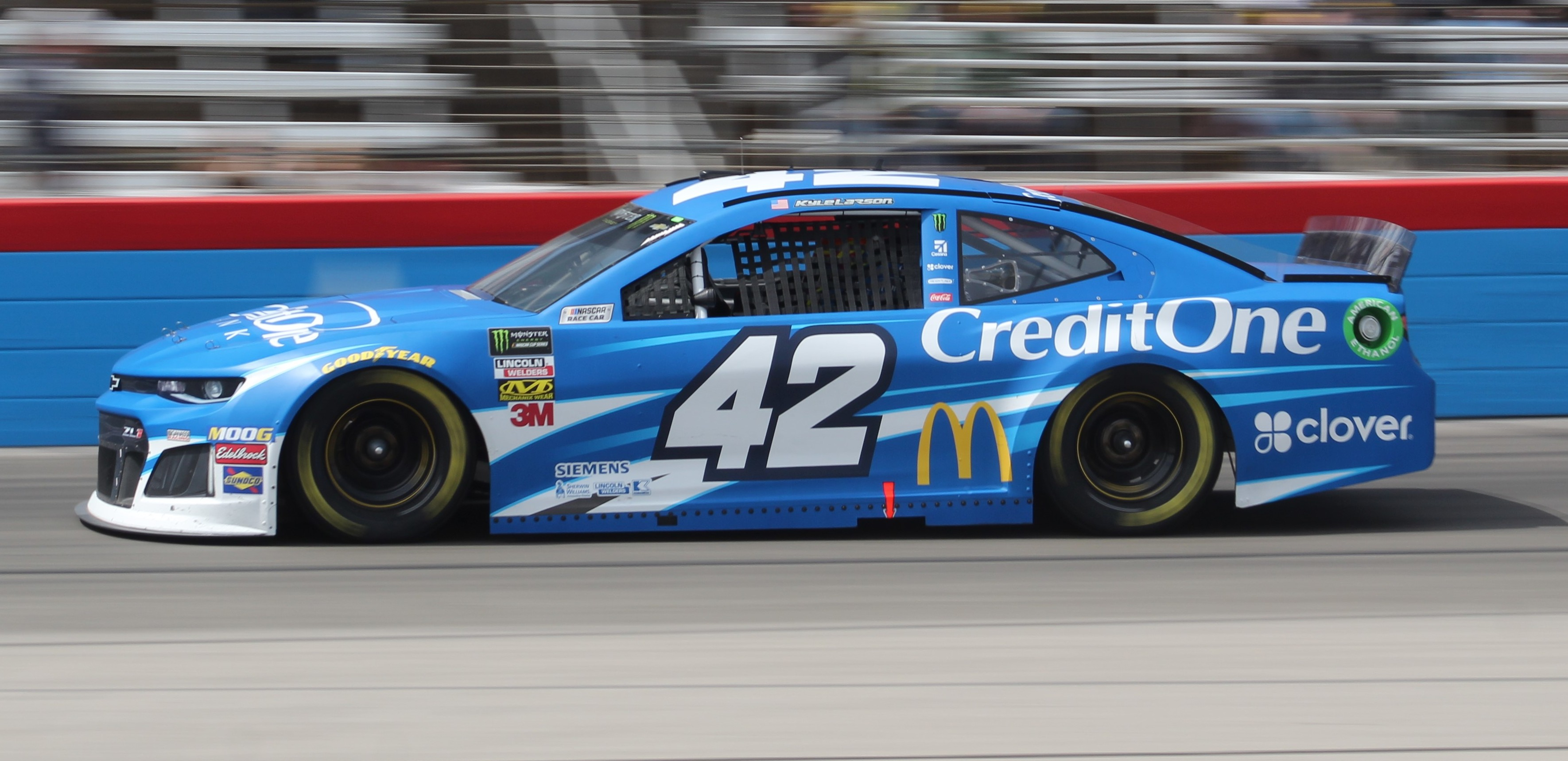
Kyle Larson driving the #42 car with a Credit One Bank sponsorship

Credit One Bank has participated in local community initiatives, such as partnering with the Public Education Foundation to create a scholarship program for low to moderate income families in Nevada.

In the sports sector, the bank is the official credit card of NASCAR in the United States and has sponsored NASCAR Cup Series teams such as Chip Ganassi Racing’s Jamie McMurray (2017) and Kyle Larson (2018–2020). In addition to its NASCAR involvement, Credit One Bank began a partnership with the Las Vegas Raiders (NFL) in 2019, issuing a team-branded credit card, and has supported the Maxx Crosby Foundation. The bank also holds naming rights to Credit One Stadium in Charleston, South Carolina, which hosts the annual Women's Tennis Association Charleston Open tennis tournament, and it has sponsored the Cincinnati Open. Credit One Bank has a sponsorship arrangement with the MiLB's Las Vegas Aviators, the NHL’s Vegas Golden Knights, and the WWE Championship, issuing branded credit cards for the WWE and the NHL team.

== Legal issues ==
In 2001, to settle an investigation by the Office of the Comptroller of the Currency, the bank repaid $4 million to customers who cancelled their cards after realizing that the credit limit that they received, after paying annual fees and security deposits, was too low to make any purchases.

In 2004, the bank paid $10 million for allegedly encouraging people to charge security deposits to new cards, leaving them almost no available credit. In both cases, the bank did not admit wrongdoing.

In 2015, a lawsuit was filed after a customer received 465 robocalls from the bank, in violation of the Telephone Consumer Protection Act, for debt collection of $657 in debt. In 2020, plaintiff was awarded $232,000, or $500 per call.

In January 2019, Riverside County, California district attorney Mike Hestrin began an investigation of a third-party vendor of Credit One for making harassing debt collection calls in violation of California law. The bank sued the district attorney, claiming that this matter was in the jurisdiction of the Office of the Comptroller of the Currency.

A lawsuit filed in 2020 alleged that Credit One Bank was in violation of the Truth in Lending Act, following a practice of frequently failing to post customer payments to their accounts within the required and or expected time frame unless the customer pays an "express payment" fee. In 2021, the case was referred to arbitration.

In June 2022, a bankruptcy judge found Credit One Bank liable to roughly 288,000 credit card customers for attempting to collect debts after such debts were discharged via bankruptcies. In January 2024, the bank filed to decertify the class action status of the case.

In 2023, the bank was sued for reporting disputed information to credit reporting agencies. Summary judgement was granted in favor of the bank, which was appealed.
