= Credit One Stadium =

Tennis stadium in Charleston, South Carolina

Coordinates: 32.86167°N 79.90202°W

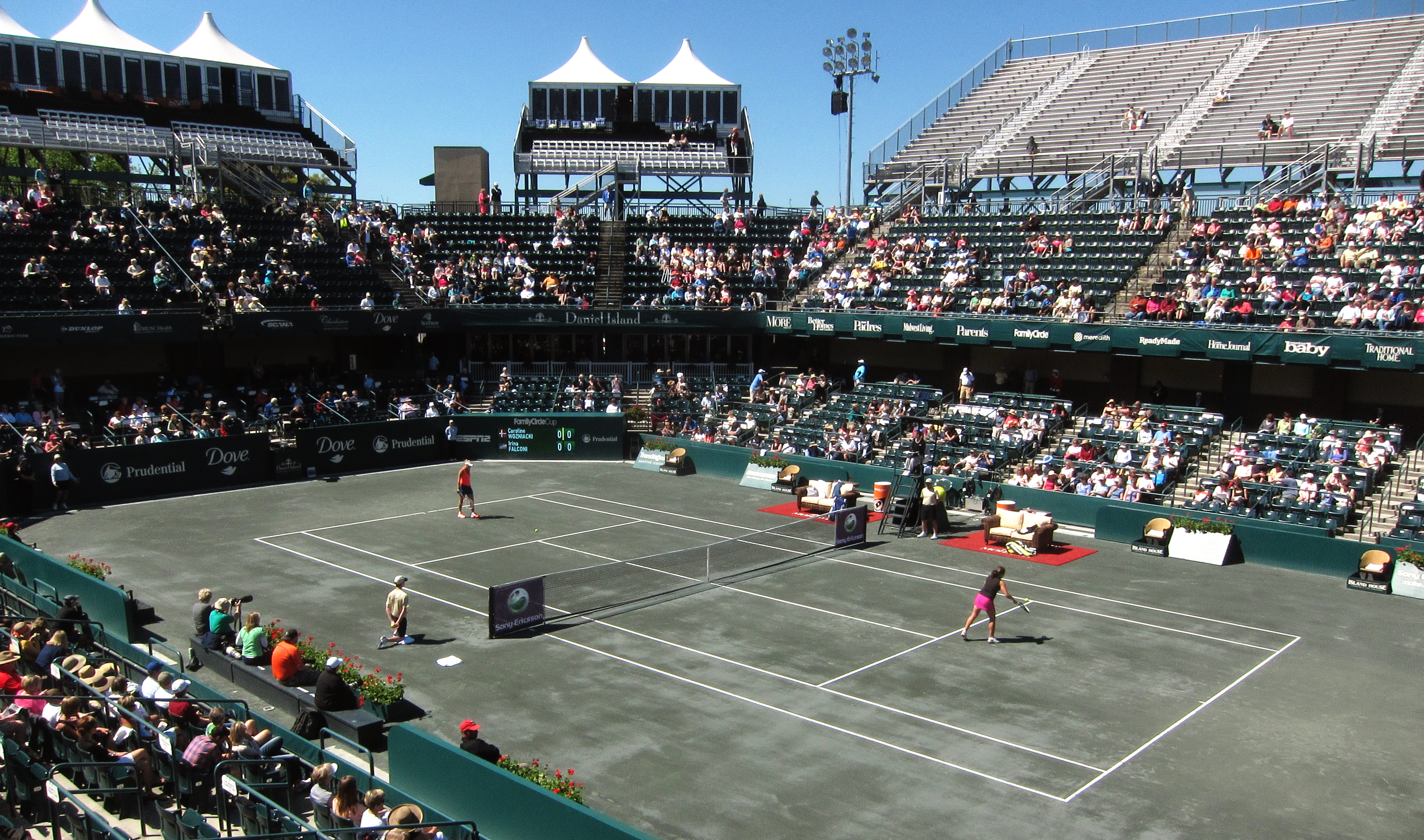
- Credit One Stadium (pictured in 2011 as the Family Circle Stadium)
- Interactive map of Credit One Stadium
- Location: 161 Seven Farms Drive; Charleston, South Carolina
- Capacity: 10,200 (tennis)
- Surface: Clay, Outdoors

Construction
- Opened: 2001
- Renovated: 2022
- Expanded: 2022
- Cost: $15 million $40 million (2022 renovations)
- Structural engineer: Geiger Engineers (for 2022 renovations)

Tenants
- CreditOne Bank Invitational (2020); Charleston Open (2001–present); AVP Charleston Open (2007–2008); Davis Cup (USA vs Belarus) (Sep 2004)

Website
- www.creditonestadium.com

Credit One Stadium is a tennis stadium located within the LTP Daniel Island tennis complex (formerly Family Circle Tennis Center) on Daniel Island in Charleston, South Carolina. Built in 2001, the Family Circle Tennis Center has 17 courts, including the 10,200-seat main stadium, named the Credit One Stadium after Credit One Bank became the new title sponsor in 2021. Since 2001, it has hosted the WTA Tour's Charleston Open, a WTA 500 tournament, and is the only facility to host an event on the WTA Tour that is played on green Har-Tru clay courts.

== History ==
In April 2021, the Charleston Open marked the groundbreaking for the center's new main stadium. After some portions of the original stadium were demolished, the new seating sections were built along with a new 70,000-square-foot, four-story Stage House for all players' facilities that is topped by a new canopy providing shade and rigging capacity for shows. The renovations expanded the stadium's seating capacity from 7,000 to 11,000 patrons. Additional upgrades were made to the facility's lighting, landscaping, concession offerings, and bathroom facilities. The renovation was estimated at US$40 million and funded mostly by Charleston Tennis owners Ben Navarro and his wife, Kelly, with another US$3 million budgeted by the city of Charleston over the following years.

In July 2021, the Charleston Open named Credit One Bank as the title sponsor for the tennis tournament. The bank took over the naming rights for the center's main stadium in a multi-year deal.

== See also ==
- List of tennis stadiums by capacity
