= Ben Navarro =

American businessman (born 1962)

- Born: Benjamin W. Navarro; 1962 (age 63–64); Williamstown, Massachusetts, U.S.
- Education: University of Rhode Island (1984)
- Occupation: Businessman
- Known for: Founder and CEO, Beemok Capital
- Spouse: Kelly Navarro
- Children: 4, including Emma
- Father: Frank Navarro

Benjamin W. Navarro (born 1962) is an American billionaire businessman who is the founder and chief executive officer of Beemok Capital, a private investment firm and family office. Through Beemok, he oversees a range of initiatives, including Beemok Hospitality Collection, a Charleston-based luxury hospitality company, and the ownership and operation of professional tennis tournaments such as the Charleston Open and Cincinnati Open. As of May 2026, Forbes estimated his net worth at US$3.2 billion.

He is also the founder and chief executive officer (CEO) of Sherman Financial Group, and a significant minority owner of Credit One Bank, a national credit card issuer. Navarro is known for his philanthropy in education, including the founding of Meeting Street Schools and the Meeting Street Scholarship Fund, as well as for his civic projects in Charleston.

== Early life and education ==
Navarro was born in Williamstown, Massachusetts, one of eight children of Frank Navarro, a college football coach for Williams College who posed for the Norman Rockwell painting The Recruit. He grew up in Westerly and Chariho, Rhode Island. He is of Italian descent; his grandparents arrived to the U.S. from Italy, entering via Ellis Island. He lived in Princeton, New Jersey, and graduated from Princeton High School, when his father was coaching the Princeton University football team.

Navarro earned a bachelor's degree in finance from the University of Rhode Island in 1984. While in university, he created a "student VIP" card, which he sold to businesses.

== Career ==
=== Early career ===
Navarro started his career at Chemical Bank, where he worked for two years making loans to banks after completing a credit-training program. Navarro then worked for Goldman Sachs for three years, where he worked on whole loans and agency mortgage-backed securities. In 1988, he joined Citigroup, where he rose to vice president and co-head of mortgage sales and trading, in charge of residential mortgage purchases and securitizations.

=== Sherman Financial Group ===
Navarro left Citigroup in 1997, and in 1998, he founded Sherman Financial Group. In 2005, Sherman acquired First National Bank of Marin and renamed it Credit One Bank. It is now a major credit card issuer, offering a range of cards, including some for subprime borrowers, through Visa, American Express, and Mastercard. Navarro has been credited for helping transform the once small and fragmented business of collecting credit card debt into a multibillion-dollar industry. In 2011 and 2014, his companies were criticized for aggressive debt collection practices; however, in 2024, the companies underwent 54 regularly scheduled regulatory examinations, as well as a COVID-specific assessment, with zero violations.

=== Beemok Capital ===
Beemok Capital is a family office and private investment firm founded by Navarro. It manages a diverse portfolio, including hospitality, sports, and real estate.

==== Beemok Hospitality Collection ====
Beemok Hospitality Collection (BHC), founded in 2021, is a Charleston-based luxury hospitality company consisting of hotel, restaurant, and entertainment properties in the Southeastern United States. The company acquired Charleston Place, the largest hotel in Charleston at 434 rooms, in October 2021. Additional properties include Sorelle, an Italian restaurant; The Riviera, a restored Art Deco theatre; and The Cooper, a waterfront luxury hotel. BHC also developed American Gardens, a community park in downtown Charleston, to honor his father. The park is framed by 80 crepe myrtles, two large fountains, and a lawn surrounded by oak trees. BHC funds the day-to-day operations and maintenance of American Gardens. In an article written by the city paper, Charleston Mayor William Cogswell said that “the park was a place that showcases the best of the Holy City.”

==== Sports & Entertainment ====
Navarro has several tennis investments through Beemok Sports & Entertainment (BSE):

===== The Credit One Charleston Open =====
In September 2018, Navarro, through Beekmok Sports, acquired Charleston Tennis LLC, which owns and operates a WTA 500 tennis tournament hosted in Charleston. At the time it was known as the Volvo Car Open. In 2021, a new title sponsorship was announced with Credit One Bank and the tournament was renamed the Credit One Charleston Open.

In February 2026, Navarro doubled the prize money for the Credit One Charleston Open to $2.5 million, a move that makes it the first standalone WTA 500 event to proactively offer equal prize money as to what is required for a men's ATP 500 level event.

===== Credit One Stadium =====
In 2022, Navarro funded extensive renovations to Credit One Stadium, a 20-year-old city-owned facility, as a gift to the City of Charleston. The project expanded the stadium's seating capacity from 7,500 to 11,000, and introduced many modern amenities such as physical therapy and exercise space for players.

===== The Cincinnati Open =====
In 2022, Beemok Capital bought the rights to the Cincinnati Open. Formerly the Western & Southern Open, this is one of the oldest tennis tournaments in the U.S. In 2024, Navarro began a $260 million renovation of the campus to improve its facilities and fan experience. Changes included the building of The Clubhouse, a space for players with a restaurant, lounge spaces, and recovery space; as well as new outdoor practice courts, an indoor center with six courts, renovations to the Performance Center, and updated seats for every spectator. The campus size was doubled to more than 40 acres during the renovation.

===== Live to Play Racquet Club =====
LTP offers premier racquet sports facilities and training for athletes of all ages and skill levels, along with academic support for aspiring collegiate student-athletes.

Navarro owns the Live To Play Racquet Club in both Mount Pleasant and Daniel Island, South Carolina.

== Philanthropy ==
=== Meeting Street Schools ===
In 2008, Navarro founded Meeting Street Schools, a nonprofit and South Carolina-based network of one private and three public elementary and middle schools serving over 1,800 students of an under-resourced demographic. Meeting Street Academy, the flagship school, provides year-round education as well as an extended day option and summer programming.

In 2014, the nonprofit entered a public-private partnership with the Charleston County School District. Through the partnership, public schools in high-poverty neighborhoods receive the usual state and federal funding, along with additional funding from Meeting Street that allows for improvements such as two teachers per classroom, comprehensive mental health and social-emotional support, and afterschool and summer programs.

=== Meeting Street Scholarship Fund ===
In December 2020, Navarro announced the Meeting Street Scholarship Fund, wherein he pledged to supplement the cost of higher education for any Charleston County high school students who also qualified for the Pell grant and the State's LIFE scholarship, ensuring college opportunities for hundreds of South Carolina high school graduates each year. Since its inception, the scholarship has expanded to 14 counties and has awarded over $20 million in scholarship dollars to about 1500 students. The scholarship fund’s aim is to expand to all 46 South Carolina counties. Donors have committed to $60 million in scholarships as of June 2025. In 2026, $15 million was extended to Meeting Street Scholarships in the Governor's budget.

=== Excellence in Teaching Awards ===
In 2021, Navarro donated $1.25 million to College of Charleston’s teacher education programs, and Meeting Street launched its Excellence in Teaching Awards program. The program awards bonuses to teachers whose students make significant improvements in math and reading skills. As of October 2025, almost $5 million has been awarded to teachers through the program.

In March 2025, the South Carolina Department of Education introduced an initiative modeled after the Excellence in Teaching Awards. The department allocated $5 million in merit-based rewards for teachers at 37 schools across the state.

=== Modern Minds ===
In 2020, in partnership with the Medical University of South Carolina, Navarro founded Modern Minds, a mental wellness center that uses holistic health strategies to help adults living with anxiety or depression. In 2025, Modern Minds merged with Synchronicity.

=== Charleston Community Projects ===
==== Union Pier ====
In March 2024, the State Ports Authority (SPA) in Charleston unanimously approved selling Navarro Union Pier, a 65-acre site that functioned as a cruise ship terminal and concrete parking lot. It was the last large piece of undeveloped historic property in downtown Charleston. The SPA stated its "faith" in Navarro to redevelop the site into a green space with residential development that included affordable housing. The deal is expected to close in 2027.

At the time of the deal's approval, Navarro's starting tenets for the redevelopment were focused on making the site a welcoming and accessible waterfront destination. He wanted to remove cruise ship operations, reduce overall density compared to prior proposals, and incorporate plenty of open space. Additional tenets included providing public access to the waterfront, working to match Charleston's architectural and cultural identity, and establishing a resiliency plan to address flooding.

In October 2025, Navarro shared a public update on the project through the publication The Post and Courier. That same month, the SPA completed the restoration and stabilization of the historic Bennett Rice Mill. The Mill sits within Union Pier and, according to The Post and Courier, was “widely regarded as the only structure worthy of saving” on the property. It is expected to play a prominent role in Beemok Capital’s redevelopment plans.

==== The Carroll Building and the College of Charleston ====
In September 2025, Beemok Capital purchased the Carroll Building, which had been abandoned for many years. The building and land were donated to the College of Charleston to be the site of a new business school.

The Carroll Building sits adjacent to Union Pier.

== Personal life ==
Ben Navarro is married to Kelly; they have four children and live in Charleston, South Carolina. Their daughter, Emma Navarro is a professional tennis player who currently plays on the WTA Tour. Navarro teaches a course on intentionality in the School of Business at the College of Charleston. As of 2025, Navarro has gifted two downtown Charleston properties to the College of Charleston, the most recent of these being a new intentionality center.

In 2021, Navarro contributed $500,000 to a political action committee (PAC) supporting Tim Scott. In 2023, he contributed $5 million to the PAC.
