= 2017 WTA Tour =

Women's tennis circuit

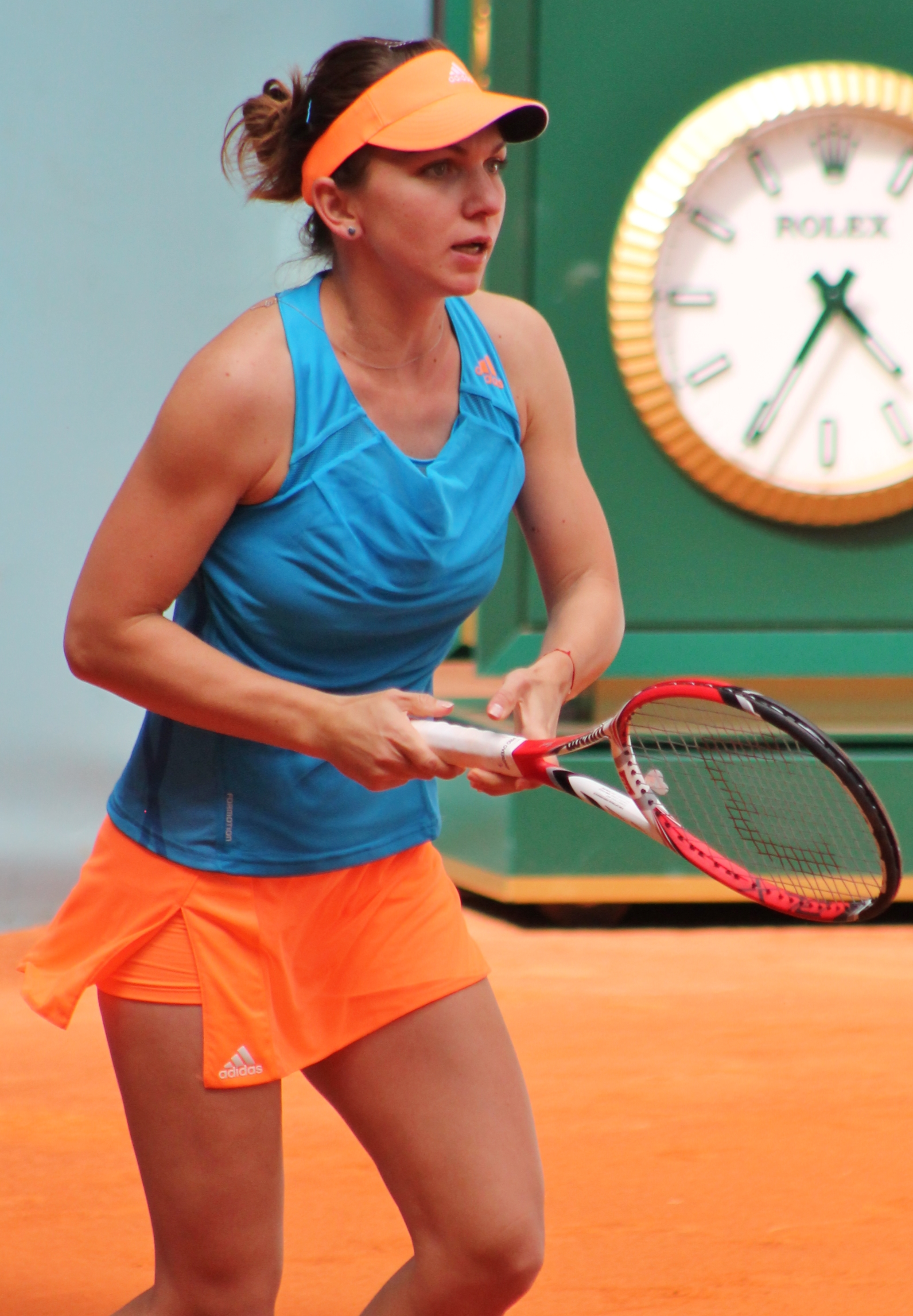
- Simona Halep finished the year as WTA world No. 1 for the first time in her career, though Garbiñe Muguruza was named the Player of the Year. Halep won one tournament during the season, a Premier Mandatory event, and finished runner-up at a major, the French Open. Muguruza won two tournaments during the season, including a major at the Wimbledon Championships, and a Premier 5 event.

Details
- Duration: 1 January – 5 November 2017
- Edition: 47th
- Tournaments: 59
- Categories: Grand Slam (4); WTA Finals; WTA Premier Mandatory (4); WTA Premier 5 (5); WTA Premier (12); WTA International (32); WTA Elite Trophy

Achievements (singles)
- Most titles: (Ukraine) Elina Svitolina (5)
- Most finals: (Denmark) Caroline Wozniacki (8)
- Prize money leader: (United States) Venus Williams (US$5,468,741)
- Points leader: (Romania) Simona Halep (6,175)

Awards
- Player of the year: (Spain) Garbiñe Muguruza
- Doubles team of the year: (Chinese Taipei) Chan Yung-jan (Switzerland) Martina Hingis
- Most improved player of the year: (Latvia) Jeļena Ostapenko
- Newcomer of the year: (United States) Catherine Bellis
- Comeback player of the year: (United States) Sloane Stephens

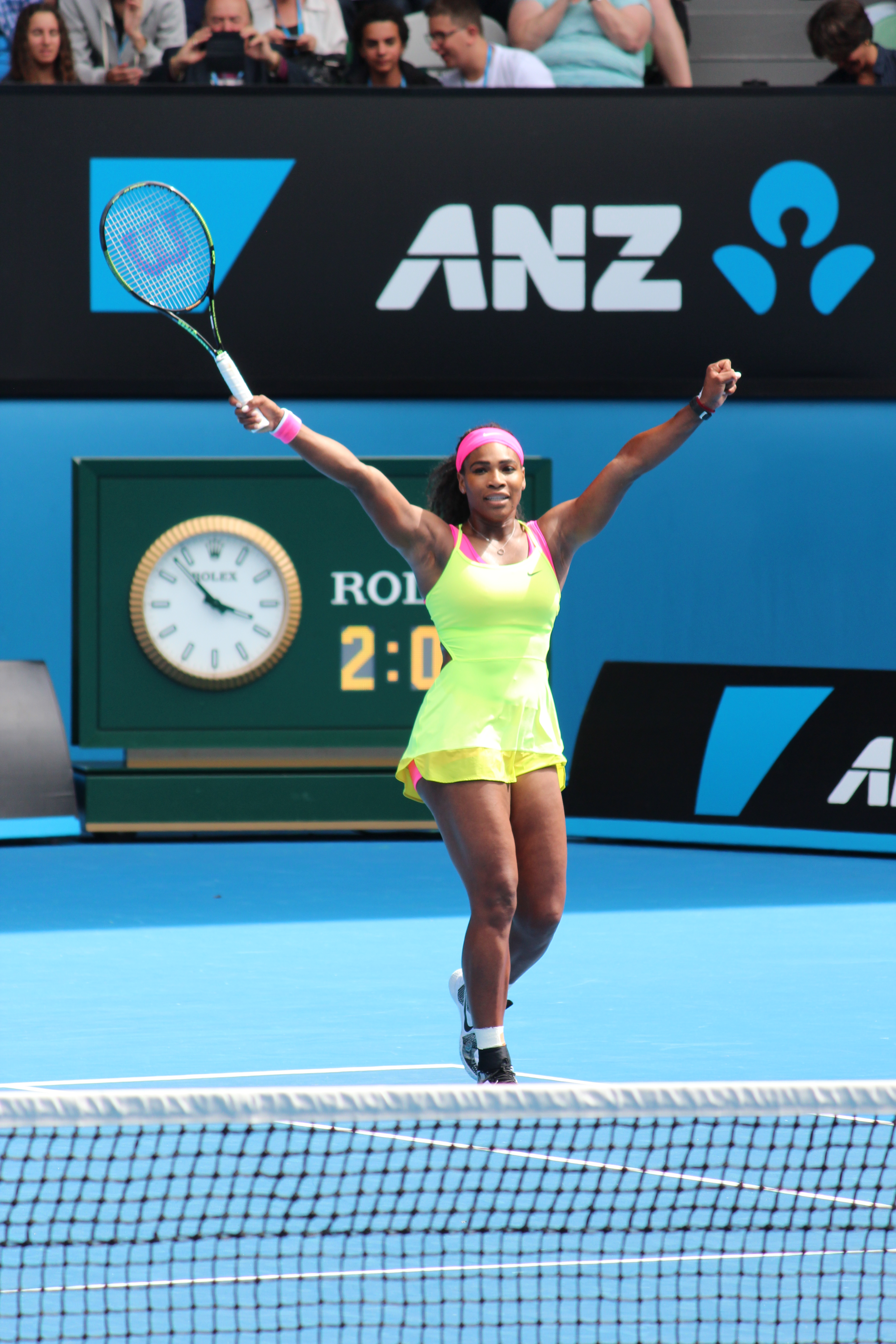
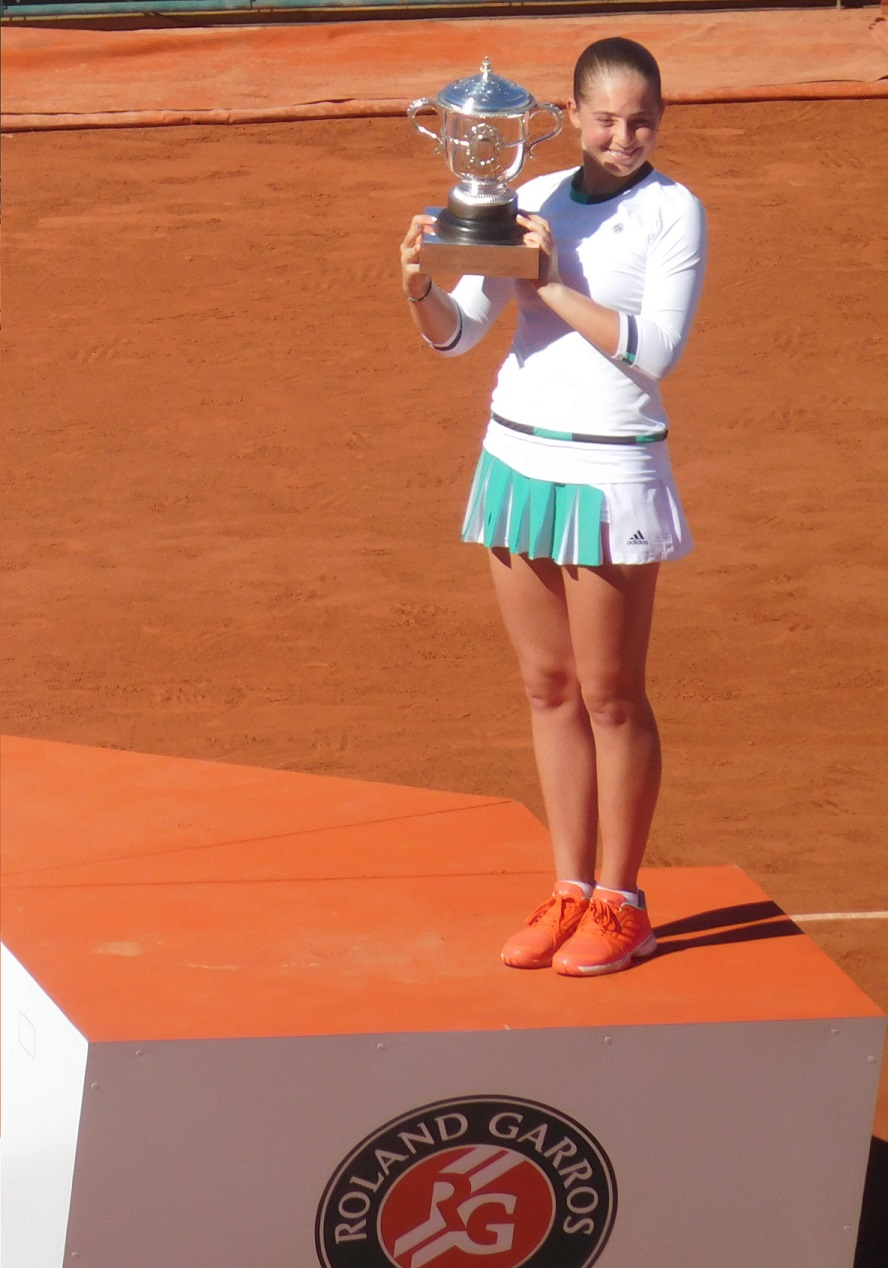
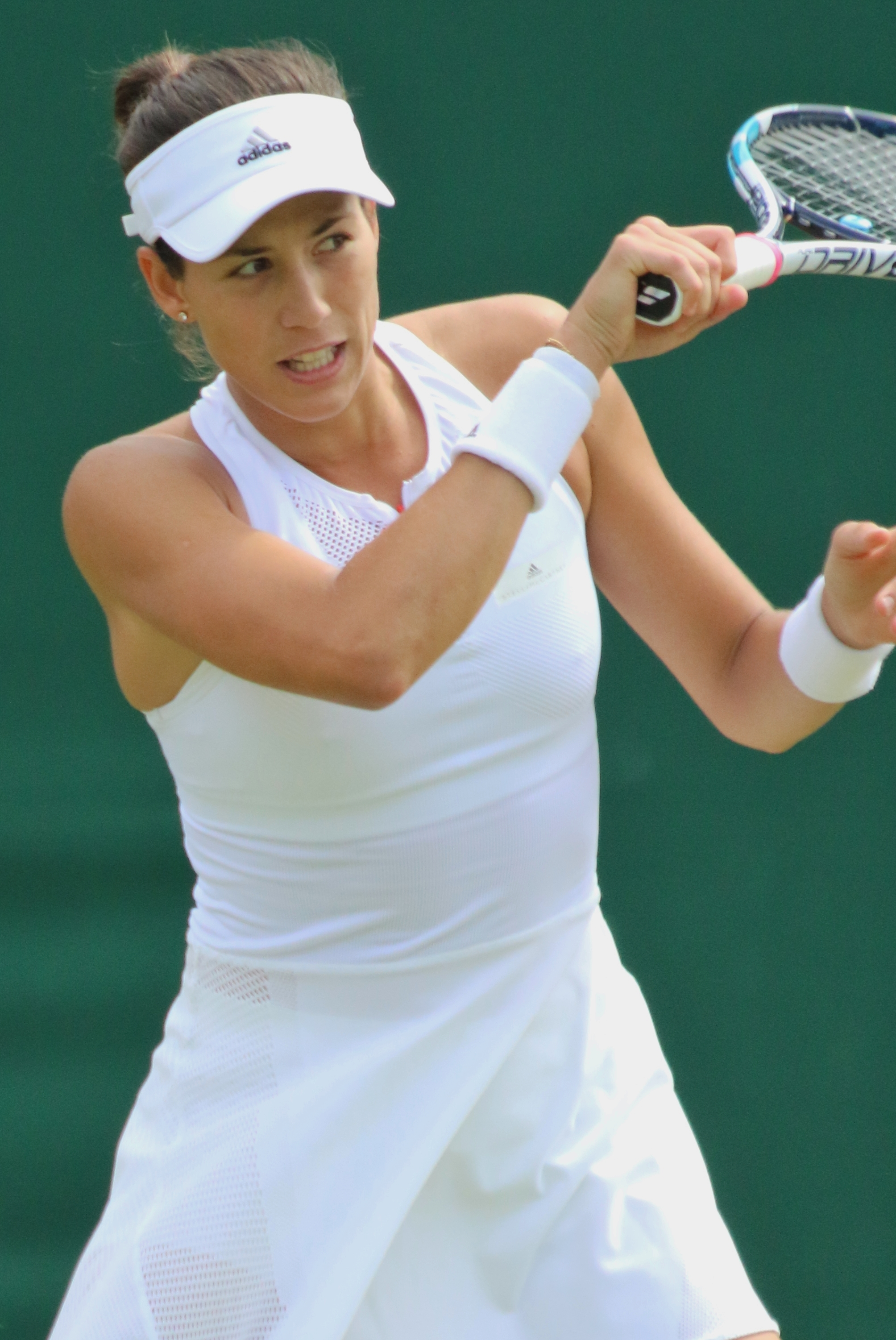
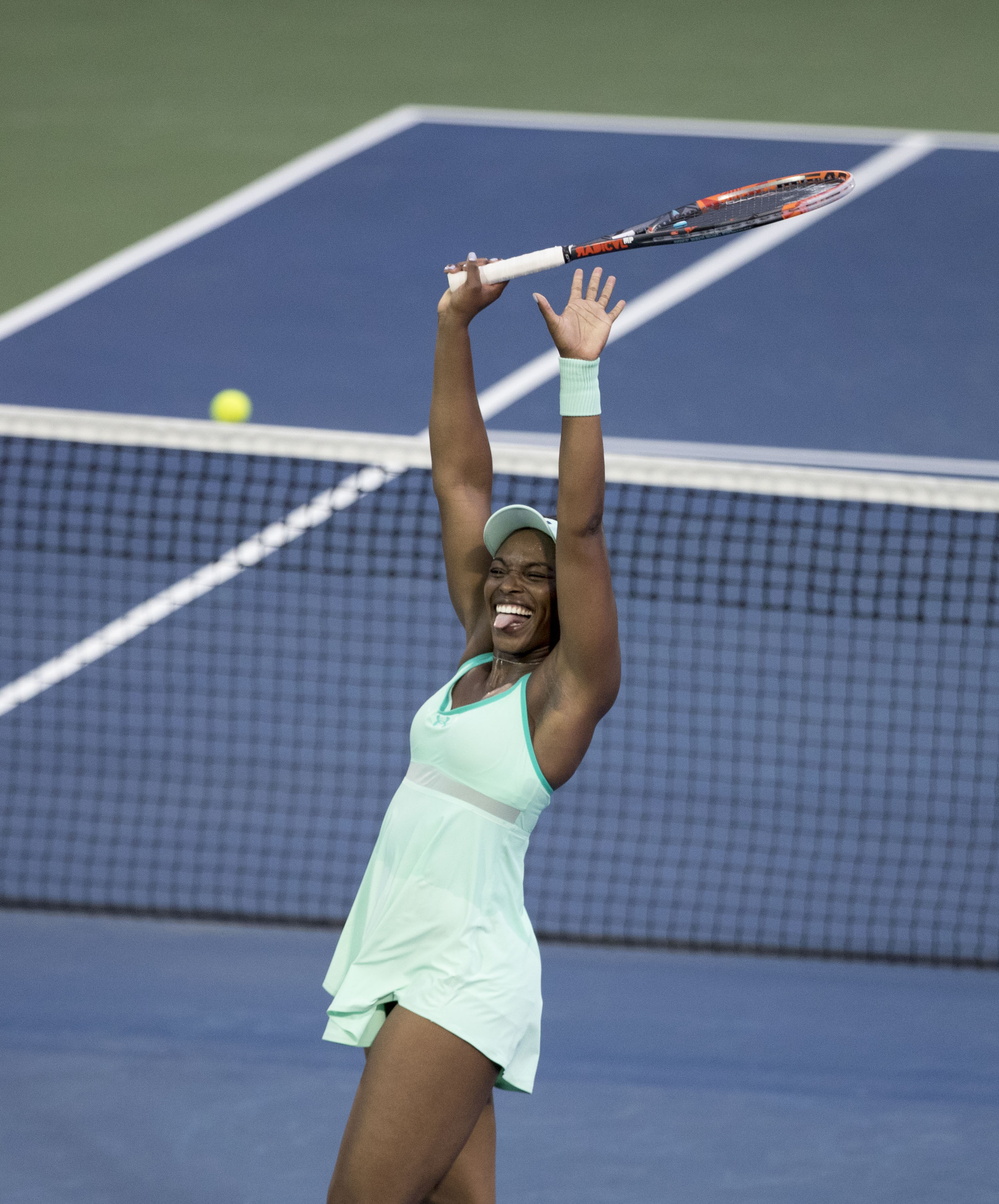
Serena Williams won her 23rd major at the Australian Open, a new record in the Open Era, defeating her sister Venus Williams. Jeļena Ostapenko won her first major and her first title overall, defeating Simona Halep in the final of the French Open to become the first player from Latvia to win a major, and the first unseeded player to win the French Open since 1933. Garbiñe Muguruza won her second major at Wimbledon, defeating Venus Williams in the final. Sloane Stephens won her first major title at the US Open, defeating Madison Keys in the final, becoming the second unseeded woman in the Open era to win the US Open after Kim Clijsters in 2009.

The 2017 WTA Tour was the elite professional tennis circuit organised by the Women's Tennis Association (WTA) for the 2017 tennis season. The 2017 WTA Tour calendar comprises the Grand Slam tournaments (supervised by the International Tennis Federation (ITF), the WTA Premier tournaments (Premier Mandatory, Premier 5, and regular Premier), the WTA International tournaments, the Fed Cup (organized by the ITF), the year-end championships (the WTA Tour Championships and the WTA Elite Trophy). Also included in the 2017 calendar is the Hopman Cup, which is organized by the ITF and does not distribute ranking points.

== Schedule ==
This is the complete schedule of events on the 2017 calendar, with player progression documented from the quarterfinals stage.

Key

Grand Slam tournaments
Year-end championships
WTA Premier Mandatory
WTA Premier 5
WTA Premier
WTA International
Team events

=== January ===
Week	Tournament	Champions	Runners-up	Semifinalists	Quarterfinalists
2 Jan	Hopman Cup; Perth, Australia; ITF Mixed Teams Championships; Hard (i) – 8 teams (RR)	France; 2–1	United States	Round robin (Group A) Switzerland; Germany; Great Britain	Round robin (Group B) Spain; Czech Republic; Australia
2 Jan	Brisbane International; Brisbane, Australia; WTA Premier; Hard – $1,000,000 – 30S/32Q/16D; Singles – Doubles	(Czech Republic) Karolína Plíšková; 6–0, 6–3	(France) Alizé Cornet	(Ukraine) Elina Svitolina (Spain) Garbiñe Muguruza	(Germany) Angelique Kerber (Italy) Roberta Vinci (Russia) Svetlana Kuznetsova (Slovakia) Dominika Cibulková
2 Jan	Brisbane International; Brisbane, Australia; WTA Premier; Hard – $1,000,000 – 30S/32Q/16D; Singles – Doubles	(United States) Bethanie Mattek-Sands (India) Sania Mirza; 6–2, 6–3	(Russia) Ekaterina Makarova (Russia) Elena Vesnina	(Ukraine) Elina Svitolina (Spain) Garbiñe Muguruza	(Germany) Angelique Kerber (Italy) Roberta Vinci (Russia) Svetlana Kuznetsova (Slovakia) Dominika Cibulková
2 Jan	Shenzhen Open; Shenzhen, China; WTA International; Hard – $750,000 – 32S/16Q/16D; Singles – Doubles	(Czech Republic) Kateřina Siniaková; 6–3, 6–4	(United States) Alison Riske	(Italy) Camila Giorgi (United Kingdom) Johanna Konta	(Poland) Agnieszka Radwańska (China) Wang Qiang (Czech Republic) Kristýna Plíšková (Serbia) Nina Stojanović
2 Jan	Shenzhen Open; Shenzhen, China; WTA International; Hard – $750,000 – 32S/16Q/16D; Singles – Doubles	(Czech Republic) Andrea Hlaváčková (China) Peng Shuai; 6–1, 7–5	(Romania) Raluca Olaru (Ukraine) Olga Savchuk	(Italy) Camila Giorgi (United Kingdom) Johanna Konta	(Poland) Agnieszka Radwańska (China) Wang Qiang (Czech Republic) Kristýna Plíšková (Serbia) Nina Stojanović
2 Jan	Auckland Open; Auckland, New Zealand; WTA International; Hard – $250,000 – 32S/32Q/16D; Singles – Doubles	(United States) Lauren Davis; 6–3, 6–1	(Croatia) Ana Konjuh	(Latvia) Jeļena Ostapenko (Germany) Julia Görges	(United States) Madison Brengle (Czech Republic) Barbora Strýcová (Denmark) Caroline Wozniacki (Japan) Naomi Osaka
2 Jan	Auckland Open; Auckland, New Zealand; WTA International; Hard – $250,000 – 32S/32Q/16D; Singles – Doubles	(Netherlands) Kiki Bertens (Sweden) Johanna Larsson; 6–2, 6–2	(Netherlands) Demi Schuurs (Czech Republic) Renata Voráčová	(Latvia) Jeļena Ostapenko (Germany) Julia Görges	(United States) Madison Brengle (Czech Republic) Barbora Strýcová (Denmark) Caroline Wozniacki (Japan) Naomi Osaka
9 Jan	Sydney International; Sydney, Australia; WTA Premier; Hard – $776,000 – 30S/32Q/16D; Singles – Doubles	(United Kingdom) Johanna Konta; 6–4, 6–2	(Poland) Agnieszka Radwańska	(Canada) Eugenie Bouchard (Czech Republic) Barbora Strýcová	(Russia) Daria Kasatkina (Russia) Anastasia Pavlyuchenkova (Denmark) Caroline Wozniacki (China) Duan Yingying
9 Jan	Sydney International; Sydney, Australia; WTA Premier; Hard – $776,000 – 30S/32Q/16D; Singles – Doubles	(Hungary) Tímea Babos (Russia) Anastasia Pavlyuchenkova; 6–4, 6–4	(India) Sania Mirza (Czech Republic) Barbora Strýcová	(Canada) Eugenie Bouchard (Czech Republic) Barbora Strýcová	(Russia) Daria Kasatkina (Russia) Anastasia Pavlyuchenkova (Denmark) Caroline Wozniacki (China) Duan Yingying
9 Jan	Hobart International; Hobart, Australia; WTA International; Hard – $250,000 – 32S/32Q/16D; Singles – Doubles	(Belgium) Elise Mertens; 6–3, 6–1	(Romania) Monica Niculescu	(Croatia) Jana Fett (Ukraine) Lesia Tsurenko	(Netherlands) Kiki Bertens (Paraguay) Verónica Cepede Royg (Japan) Risa Ozaki (United States) Shelby Rogers
9 Jan	Hobart International; Hobart, Australia; WTA International; Hard – $250,000 – 32S/32Q/16D; Singles – Doubles	(Romania) Raluca Olaru (Ukraine) Olga Savchuk; 0–6, 6–4, [10–5]	(Canada) Gabriela Dabrowski (China) Yang Zhaoxuan	(Croatia) Jana Fett (Ukraine) Lesia Tsurenko	(Netherlands) Kiki Bertens (Paraguay) Verónica Cepede Royg (Japan) Risa Ozaki (United States) Shelby Rogers
16 Jan; 23 Jan	Australian Open; Melbourne, Australia; Grand Slam; Hard – A$22,697,600; 128S/96Q/64D/32X; Singles – Doubles – Mixed doubles	(United States) Serena Williams; 6–4, 6–4	(United States) Venus Williams	(United States) CoCo Vandeweghe (Croatia) Mirjana Lučić-Baroni	(Spain) Garbiñe Muguruza (Russia) Anastasia Pavlyuchenkova (Czech Republic) Karolína Plíšková (United Kingdom) Johanna Konta
16 Jan; 23 Jan	Australian Open; Melbourne, Australia; Grand Slam; Hard – A$22,697,600; 128S/96Q/64D/32X; Singles – Doubles – Mixed doubles	(United States) Bethanie Mattek-Sands (Czech Republic) Lucie Šafářová; 6–7^{(4–7)}, 6–3, 6–3	(Czech Republic) Andrea Hlaváčková (China) Peng Shuai	(United States) CoCo Vandeweghe (Croatia) Mirjana Lučić-Baroni	(Spain) Garbiñe Muguruza (Russia) Anastasia Pavlyuchenkova (Czech Republic) Karolína Plíšková (United Kingdom) Johanna Konta
16 Jan; 23 Jan	Australian Open; Melbourne, Australia; Grand Slam; Hard – A$22,697,600; 128S/96Q/64D/32X; Singles – Doubles – Mixed doubles	(United States) Abigail Spears (Colombia) Juan Sebastián Cabal; 6–2, 6–4	(India) Sania Mirza (Croatia) Ivan Dodig	(United States) CoCo Vandeweghe (Croatia) Mirjana Lučić-Baroni	(Spain) Garbiñe Muguruza (Russia) Anastasia Pavlyuchenkova (Czech Republic) Karolína Plíšková (United Kingdom) Johanna Konta
30 Jan	St. Petersburg Ladies Trophy; Saint Petersburg, Russia; WTA Premier; Hard (i) – $776,000 – 28S/32Q/16D; Singles – Doubles	(France) Kristina Mladenovic; 6–2, 6–7^{(3–7)}, 6–4	(Kazakhstan) Yulia Putintseva	(Russia) Natalia Vikhlyantseva (Slovakia) Dominika Cibulková	(Romania) Simona Halep (Italy) Roberta Vinci (Russia) Svetlana Kuznetsova (Russia) Elena Vesnina
30 Jan	St. Petersburg Ladies Trophy; Saint Petersburg, Russia; WTA Premier; Hard (i) – $776,000 – 28S/32Q/16D; Singles – Doubles	(Latvia) Jeļena Ostapenko (Poland) Alicja Rosolska; 3–6, 6–2, [10–5]	(Croatia) Darija Jurak (Switzerland) Xenia Knoll	(Russia) Natalia Vikhlyantseva (Slovakia) Dominika Cibulková	(Romania) Simona Halep (Italy) Roberta Vinci (Russia) Svetlana Kuznetsova (Russia) Elena Vesnina
30 Jan	Taiwan Open; Taipei, Taiwan; WTA International; Hard (i) – $250,000 – 32S/24Q/16D; Singles – Doubles	(Ukraine) Elina Svitolina; 6–3, 6–2	(China) Peng Shuai	(Luxembourg) Mandy Minella (Czech Republic) Lucie Šafářová	(Tunisia) Ons Jabeur (China) Zhu Lin (Japan) Misaki Doi (Australia) Samantha Stosur
30 Jan	Taiwan Open; Taipei, Taiwan; WTA International; Hard (i) – $250,000 – 32S/24Q/16D; Singles – Doubles	(Chinese Taipei) Chan Hao-ching (Chinese Taipei) Chan Yung-jan; 6–4, 6–2	(Czech Republic) Lucie Hradecká (Czech Republic) Kateřina Siniaková	(Luxembourg) Mandy Minella (Czech Republic) Lucie Šafářová	(Tunisia) Ons Jabeur (China) Zhu Lin (Japan) Misaki Doi (Australia) Samantha Stosur

=== February ===
Week	Tournament	Champions	Runners-up	Semifinalists	Quarterfinalists
6 Feb	Fed Cup Quarterfinals; Ostrava, Czech Republic – hard (i); Maui, United States – hard Minsk, Belarus – hard (i); Geneva, Switzerland – hard (i)	Quarterfinals winners Czech Republic 3–2; United States 4–0; Belarus 4–1; Switzerland 4–1	Quarterfinals losers Spain; Germany; Netherlands; France		
13 Feb	Qatar Open; Doha, Qatar; WTA Premier; Hard – $776,000 – 28S/32Q/16D; Singles – Doubles	(Czech Republic) Karolína Plíšková; 6–3, 6–4	(Denmark) Caroline Wozniacki	(Puerto Rico) Monica Puig (Slovakia) Dominika Cibulková	(Russia) Daria Kasatkina (United States) Lauren Davis (Australia) Samantha Stosur (China) Zhang Shuai
13 Feb	Qatar Open; Doha, Qatar; WTA Premier; Hard – $776,000 – 28S/32Q/16D; Singles – Doubles	(United States) Abigail Spears (Slovenia) Katarina Srebotnik; 6–3, 7–6^{(9–7)}	(Ukraine) Olga Savchuk (Kazakhstan) Yaroslava Shvedova	(Puerto Rico) Monica Puig (Slovakia) Dominika Cibulková	(Russia) Daria Kasatkina (United States) Lauren Davis (Australia) Samantha Stosur (China) Zhang Shuai
20 Feb	Dubai Tennis Championships; Dubai, United Arab Emirates; WTA Premier 5 Hard – $2,666,000 – 56S/32Q/28D; Singles – Doubles	(Ukraine) Elina Svitolina; 6–4, 6–2	(Denmark) Caroline Wozniacki	(Germany) Angelique Kerber (Latvia) Anastasija Sevastova	(Croatia) Ana Konjuh (United States) Lauren Davis (United States) Catherine Bellis (China) Wang Qiang
20 Feb	Dubai Tennis Championships; Dubai, United Arab Emirates; WTA Premier 5 Hard – $2,666,000 – 56S/32Q/28D; Singles – Doubles	(Russia) Ekaterina Makarova (Russia) Elena Vesnina; 6–2, 4–6, [10–7]	(Czech Republic) Andrea Hlaváčková (China) Peng Shuai	(Germany) Angelique Kerber (Latvia) Anastasija Sevastova	(Croatia) Ana Konjuh (United States) Lauren Davis (United States) Catherine Bellis (China) Wang Qiang
20 Feb	Hungarian Ladies Open; Budapest, Hungary; WTA International; Hard (i) – $250,000 – 32S/24Q/16D; Singles – Doubles	(Hungary) Tímea Babos; 6–7^{(4–7)}, 6–4, 6–3	(Czech Republic) Lucie Šafářová	(Germany) Julia Görges (Germany) Carina Witthöft	(France) Océane Dodin (Belgium) Yanina Wickmayer (Germany) Annika Beck (Belarus) Aliaksandra Sasnovich
20 Feb	Hungarian Ladies Open; Budapest, Hungary; WTA International; Hard (i) – $250,000 – 32S/24Q/16D; Singles – Doubles	(Chinese Taipei) Hsieh Su-wei (Georgia (country)) Oksana Kalashnikova; 6–3, 4–6, [10–4]	(Australia) Arina Rodionova (Kazakhstan) Galina Voskoboeva	(Germany) Julia Görges (Germany) Carina Witthöft	(France) Océane Dodin (Belgium) Yanina Wickmayer (Germany) Annika Beck (Belarus) Aliaksandra Sasnovich
27 Feb	Mexican Open; Acapulco, Mexico; WTA International; Hard – $250,000 – 32S/24Q/16D; Singles – Doubles	(Ukraine) Lesia Tsurenko; 6–1, 7–5	(France) Kristina Mladenovic	(Croatia) Mirjana Lučić-Baroni (United States) Christina McHale	(France) Pauline Parmentier (Latvia) Jeļena Ostapenko (Puerto Rico) Monica Puig (Belgium) Kirsten Flipkens
27 Feb	Mexican Open; Acapulco, Mexico; WTA International; Hard – $250,000 – 32S/24Q/16D; Singles – Doubles	(Croatia) Darija Jurak (Australia) Anastasia Rodionova; 6–3, 6–2	(Paraguay) Verónica Cepede Royg (Colombia) Mariana Duque Mariño	(Croatia) Mirjana Lučić-Baroni (United States) Christina McHale	(France) Pauline Parmentier (Latvia) Jeļena Ostapenko (Puerto Rico) Monica Puig (Belgium) Kirsten Flipkens
27 Feb	Malaysian Open; Kuala Lumpur, Malaysia; WTA International; Hard – $250,000 – 32S/24Q/16D; Singles – Doubles	(Australia) Ashleigh Barty; 6–3, 6–2	(Japan) Nao Hibino	(Poland) Magda Linette (China) Han Xinyun	(Netherlands) Lesley Kerkhove (China) Duan Yingying (China) Wang Qiang (China) Zhang Kailin
27 Feb	Malaysian Open; Kuala Lumpur, Malaysia; WTA International; Hard – $250,000 – 32S/24Q/16D; Singles – Doubles	(Australia) Ashleigh Barty (Australia) Casey Dellacqua; 7–6^{(7–5)}, 6–3	(United States) Nicole Melichar (Japan) Makoto Ninomiya	(Poland) Magda Linette (China) Han Xinyun	(Netherlands) Lesley Kerkhove (China) Duan Yingying (China) Wang Qiang (China) Zhang Kailin

=== March ===
Week	Tournament	Champions	Runners-up	Semifinalists	Quarterfinalists
6 Mar; 13 Mar	Indian Wells Open; Indian Wells, United States; WTA Premier Mandatory; Hard – $7,669,423 – 96S/48Q/32D; Singles – Doubles	(Russia) Elena Vesnina; 6–7^{(6–8)}, 7–5, 6–4	(Russia) Svetlana Kuznetsova	(Czech Republic) Karolína Plíšková (France) Kristina Mladenovic	(Spain) Garbiñe Muguruza (Russia) Anastasia Pavlyuchenkova (Denmark) Caroline Wozniacki (United States) Venus Williams
6 Mar; 13 Mar	Indian Wells Open; Indian Wells, United States; WTA Premier Mandatory; Hard – $7,669,423 – 96S/48Q/32D; Singles – Doubles	(Chinese Taipei) Chan Yung-jan (Switzerland) Martina Hingis; 7–6^{(7–4)}, 6–2	(Czech Republic) Lucie Hradecká (Czech Republic) Kateřina Siniaková	(Czech Republic) Karolína Plíšková (France) Kristina Mladenovic	(Spain) Garbiñe Muguruza (Russia) Anastasia Pavlyuchenkova (Denmark) Caroline Wozniacki (United States) Venus Williams
20 Mar; 27 Mar	Miami Open; Key Biscayne, United States; WTA Premier Mandatory; Hard – $7,669,423 – 96S/48Q/32D; Singles – Doubles	(United Kingdom) Johanna Konta; 6–4, 6–3	(Denmark) Caroline Wozniacki	(United States) Venus Williams (Czech Republic) Karolína Plíšková	(Germany) Angelique Kerber (Romania) Simona Halep (Czech Republic) Lucie Šafářová (Croatia) Mirjana Lučić-Baroni
20 Mar; 27 Mar	Miami Open; Key Biscayne, United States; WTA Premier Mandatory; Hard – $7,669,423 – 96S/48Q/32D; Singles – Doubles	(Canada) Gabriela Dabrowski (China) Xu Yifan; 6–4, 6–3	(India) Sania Mirza (Czech Republic) Barbora Strýcová	(United States) Venus Williams (Czech Republic) Karolína Plíšková	(Germany) Angelique Kerber (Romania) Simona Halep (Czech Republic) Lucie Šafářová (Croatia) Mirjana Lučić-Baroni

=== April ===
Week	Tournament	Champions	Runners-up	Semifinalists	Quarterfinalists
3 Apr	Charleston Open; Charleston, United States; WTA Premier; Clay – $776,000 (Green) – 56S/32Q/16D; Singles – Doubles	(Russia) Daria Kasatkina; 6–3, 6–1	(Latvia) Jeļena Ostapenko	(Croatia) Mirjana Lučić-Baroni (Germany) Laura Siegemund	(United States) Shelby Rogers (Denmark) Caroline Wozniacki (Latvia) Anastasija Sevastova (Romania) Irina-Camelia Begu
3 Apr	Charleston Open; Charleston, United States; WTA Premier; Clay – $776,000 (Green) – 56S/32Q/16D; Singles – Doubles	(United States) Bethanie Mattek-Sands (Czech Republic) Lucie Šafářová; 6–1, 4–6, [10–7]	(Czech Republic) Lucie Hradecká (Czech Republic) Kateřina Siniaková	(Croatia) Mirjana Lučić-Baroni (Germany) Laura Siegemund	(United States) Shelby Rogers (Denmark) Caroline Wozniacki (Latvia) Anastasija Sevastova (Romania) Irina-Camelia Begu
3 Apr	Monterrey Open; Monterrey, Mexico; WTA International; Hard – $250,000 – 32S/32Q/16D; Singles – Doubles	(Russia) Anastasia Pavlyuchenkova; 6–4, 2–6, 6–1	(Germany) Angelique Kerber	(Spain) Carla Suárez Navarro (France) Caroline Garcia	(United Kingdom) Heather Watson (France) Alizé Cornet (United States) Julia Boserup (Hungary) Tímea Babos
3 Apr	Monterrey Open; Monterrey, Mexico; WTA International; Hard – $250,000 – 32S/32Q/16D; Singles – Doubles	(Japan) Nao Hibino (Poland) Alicja Rosolska; 6–2, 7–6^{(7–4)}	(Slovenia) Dalila Jakupović (Ukraine) Nadiia Kichenok	(Spain) Carla Suárez Navarro (France) Caroline Garcia	(United Kingdom) Heather Watson (France) Alizé Cornet (United States) Julia Boserup (Hungary) Tímea Babos
10 Apr	Ladies Open Biel Bienne; Biel, Switzerland; WTA International; Hard (i) – $250,000 – 32S/32Q/16D; Singles – Doubles	(Czech Republic) Markéta Vondroušová; 6–4, 7–6^{(8–6)}	(Estonia) Anett Kontaveit	(Czech Republic) Barbora Strýcová (Belarus) Aliaksandra Sasnovich	(Germany) Julia Görges (Czech Republic) Kristýna Plíšková (Belgium) Elise Mertens (Italy) Camila Giorgi
10 Apr	Ladies Open Biel Bienne; Biel, Switzerland; WTA International; Hard (i) – $250,000 – 32S/32Q/16D; Singles – Doubles	(Chinese Taipei) Hsieh Su-wei (Romania) Monica Niculescu; 5–7, 6–3, [10–7]	(Switzerland) Timea Bacsinszky (Switzerland) Martina Hingis	(Czech Republic) Barbora Strýcová (Belarus) Aliaksandra Sasnovich	(Germany) Julia Görges (Czech Republic) Kristýna Plíšková (Belgium) Elise Mertens (Italy) Camila Giorgi
10 Apr	Copa Colsanitas; Bogotá, Colombia; WTA International; Clay (red) – $250,000 – 32S/24Q/16D; Singles – Doubles	(Italy) Francesca Schiavone; 6–4, 7–5	(Spain) Lara Arruabarrena	(Sweden) Johanna Larsson (Spain) Sara Sorribes Tormo	(Netherlands) Kiki Bertens (Italy) Sara Errani (Serbia) Aleksandra Krunić (Poland) Magda Linette
10 Apr	Copa Colsanitas; Bogotá, Colombia; WTA International; Clay (red) – $250,000 – 32S/24Q/16D; Singles – Doubles	(Brazil) Beatriz Haddad Maia (Argentina) Nadia Podoroska; 6–3, 7–6^{(7–4)}	(Paraguay) Verónica Cepede Royg (Poland) Magda Linette	(Sweden) Johanna Larsson (Spain) Sara Sorribes Tormo	(Netherlands) Kiki Bertens (Italy) Sara Errani (Serbia) Aleksandra Krunić (Poland) Magda Linette
17 Apr	Fed Cup Semifinals; Tampa, United States – Clay; Minsk, Belarus – hard (i)	Semifinals winners United States 3–2; Belarus 3–2	Semifinals losers Czech Republic; Switzerland		
24 Apr	Stuttgart Open; Stuttgart, Germany; WTA Premier; Clay (red) (i) – €573,306 – 28S/32Q/16D; Singles – Doubles	(Germany) Laura Siegemund; 6–1, 2–6, 7–6^{(7–5)}	(France) Kristina Mladenovic	(Russia) Maria Sharapova (Romania) Simona Halep	(Spain) Carla Suárez Navarro (Estonia) Anett Kontaveit (Latvia) Anastasija Sevastova (Czech Republic) Karolína Plíšková
24 Apr	Stuttgart Open; Stuttgart, Germany; WTA Premier; Clay (red) (i) – €573,306 – 28S/32Q/16D; Singles – Doubles	(United States) Raquel Atawo (Latvia) Jeļena Ostapenko; 6–4, 6–4	(United States) Abigail Spears (Slovenia) Katarina Srebotnik	(Russia) Maria Sharapova (Romania) Simona Halep	(Spain) Carla Suárez Navarro (Estonia) Anett Kontaveit (Latvia) Anastasija Sevastova (Czech Republic) Karolína Plíšková
24 Apr	İstanbul Cup; Istanbul, Turkey; WTA International; Clay (red) – $250,000 – 32S/24Q/16D; Singles – Doubles	(Ukraine) Elina Svitolina; 6–2, 6–4	(Belgium) Elise Mertens	(Slovakia) Jana Čepelová (Romania) Irina-Camelia Begu	(Romania) Sorana Cîrstea (Ukraine) Dayana Yastremska (Turkey) Başak Eraydın (Turkey) Çağla Büyükakçay
24 Apr	İstanbul Cup; Istanbul, Turkey; WTA International; Clay (red) – $250,000 – 32S/24Q/16D; Singles – Doubles	(Slovenia) Dalila Jakupović (Ukraine) Nadiia Kichenok; 7–6^{(8–6)}, 6–2	(United States) Nicole Melichar (Belgium) Elise Mertens	(Slovakia) Jana Čepelová (Romania) Irina-Camelia Begu	(Romania) Sorana Cîrstea (Ukraine) Dayana Yastremska (Turkey) Başak Eraydın (Turkey) Çağla Büyükakçay

=== May ===
Week	Tournament	Champions	Runners-up	Semifinalists	Quarterfinalists
1 May	Prague Open; Prague, Czech Republic; WTA International; Clay (red) – $250,000 – 32S/32Q/16D; Singles – Doubles	(Germany) Mona Barthel; 2–6, 7–5, 6–2	(Czech Republic) Kristýna Plíšková	(Czech Republic) Barbora Strýcová (Latvia) Jeļena Ostapenko	(Italy) Camila Giorgi (Czech Republic) Kateřina Siniaková (Brazil) Beatriz Haddad Maia (Croatia) Ana Konjuh
1 May	Prague Open; Prague, Czech Republic; WTA International; Clay (red) – $250,000 – 32S/32Q/16D; Singles – Doubles	(Germany) Anna-Lena Grönefeld (Czech Republic) Květa Peschke; 6–4, 7–6^{(7–3)}	(Czech Republic) Lucie Hradecká (Czech Republic) Kateřina Siniaková	(Czech Republic) Barbora Strýcová (Latvia) Jeļena Ostapenko	(Italy) Camila Giorgi (Czech Republic) Kateřina Siniaková (Brazil) Beatriz Haddad Maia (Croatia) Ana Konjuh
1 May	Morocco Open; Rabat, Morocco; WTA International; Clay (red) – $250,000 – 32S/32Q/16D; Singles – Doubles	(Russia) Anastasia Pavlyuchenkova; 7–5, 7–5	(Italy) Francesca Schiavone	(Italy) Sara Errani (United States) Varvara Lepchenko	(United States) Lauren Davis (Australia) Daria Gavrilova (Germany) Tatjana Maria (United States) Catherine Bellis
1 May	Morocco Open; Rabat, Morocco; WTA International; Clay (red) – $250,000 – 32S/32Q/16D; Singles – Doubles	(Hungary) Tímea Babos (Czech Republic) Andrea Hlaváčková; 2–6, 6–3, [10–5]	(Serbia) Nina Stojanović (Belgium) Maryna Zanevska	(Italy) Sara Errani (United States) Varvara Lepchenko	(United States) Lauren Davis (Australia) Daria Gavrilova (Germany) Tatjana Maria (United States) Catherine Bellis
8 May	Madrid Open; Madrid, Spain; WTA Premier Mandatory; Clay (red) – €5,924,318 – 64S/32Q/28D; Singles – Doubles	(Romania) Simona Halep; 7–5, 6–7^{(5–7)}, 6–2	(France) Kristina Mladenovic	(Russia) Svetlana Kuznetsova (Latvia) Anastasija Sevastova	(Canada) Eugenie Bouchard (Romania) Sorana Cîrstea (United States) CoCo Vandeweghe (Netherlands) Kiki Bertens
8 May	Madrid Open; Madrid, Spain; WTA Premier Mandatory; Clay (red) – €5,924,318 – 64S/32Q/28D; Singles – Doubles	(Chinese Taipei) Chan Yung-jan (Switzerland) Martina Hingis; 6–4, 6–3	(Hungary) Tímea Babos (Czech Republic) Andrea Hlaváčková	(Russia) Svetlana Kuznetsova (Latvia) Anastasija Sevastova	(Canada) Eugenie Bouchard (Romania) Sorana Cîrstea (United States) CoCo Vandeweghe (Netherlands) Kiki Bertens
15 May	Italian Open; Rome, Italy; WTA Premier 5 Clay (red) – $3,076,495 – 56S/32Q/28D; Singles – Doubles	(Ukraine) Elina Svitolina; 4–6, 7–5, 6–1	(Romania) Simona Halep	(Netherlands) Kiki Bertens (Spain) Garbiñe Muguruza	(Estonia) Anett Kontaveit (Australia) Daria Gavrilova (United States) Venus Williams (Czech Republic) Karolína Plíšková
15 May	Italian Open; Rome, Italy; WTA Premier 5 Clay (red) – $3,076,495 – 56S/32Q/28D; Singles – Doubles	(Chinese Taipei) Chan Yung-jan (Switzerland) Martina Hingis; 7–5, 7–6^{(7–4)}	(Russia) Ekaterina Makarova (Russia) Elena Vesnina	(Netherlands) Kiki Bertens (Spain) Garbiñe Muguruza	(Estonia) Anett Kontaveit (Australia) Daria Gavrilova (United States) Venus Williams (Czech Republic) Karolína Plíšková
22 May	Internationaux de Strasbourg; Strasbourg, France; WTA International; Clay (red) – $250,000 – 32S/24Q/16D; Singles – Doubles	(Australia) Samantha Stosur; 5–7, 6–4, 6–3	(Australia) Daria Gavrilova	(China) Peng Shuai (France) Caroline Garcia	(United States) Shelby Rogers (Spain) Carla Suárez Navarro (Czech Republic) Kristýna Plíšková (Australia) Ashleigh Barty
22 May	Internationaux de Strasbourg; Strasbourg, France; WTA International; Clay (red) – $250,000 – 32S/24Q/16D; Singles – Doubles	(Australia) Ashleigh Barty (Australia) Casey Dellacqua; 6–4, 6–2	(Chinese Taipei) Chan Hao-ching (Chinese Taipei) Chan Yung-jan	(China) Peng Shuai (France) Caroline Garcia	(United States) Shelby Rogers (Spain) Carla Suárez Navarro (Czech Republic) Kristýna Plíšková (Australia) Ashleigh Barty
22 May	Nuremberg Cup; Nürnberg, Germany; WTA International; Clay (red) – $250,000 – 32S/24Q/16D; Singles – Doubles	(Netherlands) Kiki Bertens; 6–2, 6–1	(Czech Republic) Barbora Krejčíková	(Japan) Misaki Doi (Romania) Sorana Cîrstea	(United States) Alison Riske (Kazakhstan) Yaroslava Shvedova (Germany) Carina Witthöft (Kazakhstan) Yulia Putintseva
22 May	Nuremberg Cup; Nürnberg, Germany; WTA International; Clay (red) – $250,000 – 32S/24Q/16D; Singles – Doubles	(United States) Nicole Melichar (United Kingdom) Anna Smith; 3–6, 6–3, [11–9]	(Belgium) Kirsten Flipkens (Sweden) Johanna Larsson	(Japan) Misaki Doi (Romania) Sorana Cîrstea	(United States) Alison Riske (Kazakhstan) Yaroslava Shvedova (Germany) Carina Witthöft (Kazakhstan) Yulia Putintseva
28 May; 5 Jun	French Open; Paris, France; Grand Slam; Clay (red) – €16,566,000; 128S/96Q/64D/32X; Singles – Doubles – Mixed doubles	(Latvia) Jeļena Ostapenko; 4–6, 6–4, 6–3	(Romania) Simona Halep	(Switzerland) Timea Bacsinszky (Czech Republic) Karolína Plíšková	(Denmark) Caroline Wozniacki (France) Kristina Mladenovic (Ukraine) Elina Svitolina (France) Caroline Garcia
28 May; 5 Jun	French Open; Paris, France; Grand Slam; Clay (red) – €16,566,000; 128S/96Q/64D/32X; Singles – Doubles – Mixed doubles	(United States) Bethanie Mattek-Sands (Czech Republic) Lucie Šafářová; 6–2, 6–1	(Australia) Ashleigh Barty (Australia) Casey Dellacqua	(Switzerland) Timea Bacsinszky (Czech Republic) Karolína Plíšková	(Denmark) Caroline Wozniacki (France) Kristina Mladenovic (Ukraine) Elina Svitolina (France) Caroline Garcia
28 May; 5 Jun	French Open; Paris, France; Grand Slam; Clay (red) – €16,566,000; 128S/96Q/64D/32X; Singles – Doubles – Mixed doubles	(Canada) Gabriela Dabrowski (India) Rohan Bopanna; 2–6, 6–2, [12–10]	(Germany) Anna-Lena Grönefeld (Colombia) Robert Farah	(Switzerland) Timea Bacsinszky (Czech Republic) Karolína Plíšková	(Denmark) Caroline Wozniacki (France) Kristina Mladenovic (Ukraine) Elina Svitolina (France) Caroline Garcia

=== June ===
Week	Tournament	Champions	Runners-up	Semifinalists	Quarterfinalists
12 Jun	Nottingham Open; Nottingham, Great Britain; WTA International; Grass – $250,000 – 32S/24Q/16D; Singles – Doubles	(Croatia) Donna Vekić; 2–6, 7–6^{(7–3)}, 7–5	(United Kingdom) Johanna Konta	(Slovakia) Magdaléna Rybáriková (Czech Republic) Lucie Šafářová	(Australia) Ashleigh Barty (United States) Kristie Ahn (Bulgaria) Tsvetana Pironkova (Greece) Maria Sakkari
12 Jun	Nottingham Open; Nottingham, Great Britain; WTA International; Grass – $250,000 – 32S/24Q/16D; Singles – Doubles	(Australia) Monique Adamczak (Australia) Storm Sanders; 6–4, 4–6, [10–4]	(United Kingdom) Jocelyn Rae (United Kingdom) Laura Robson	(Slovakia) Magdaléna Rybáriková (Czech Republic) Lucie Šafářová	(Australia) Ashleigh Barty (United States) Kristie Ahn (Bulgaria) Tsvetana Pironkova (Greece) Maria Sakkari
12 Jun	Rosmalen Grass Court Championships; Rosmalen, Netherlands; WTA International; Grass – $250,000 – 32S/24Q/16D; Singles – Doubles	(Estonia) Anett Kontaveit; 6–2, 6–3	(Russia) Natalia Vikhlyantseva	(Croatia) Ana Konjuh (Ukraine) Lesia Tsurenko	(Russia) Evgeniya Rodina (Netherlands) Arantxa Rus (Germany) Carina Witthöft (France) Kristina Mladenovic
12 Jun	Rosmalen Grass Court Championships; Rosmalen, Netherlands; WTA International; Grass – $250,000 – 32S/24Q/16D; Singles – Doubles	(Slovakia) Dominika Cibulková (Belgium) Kirsten Flipkens; 4–6, 6–4, [10–6]	(Netherlands) Kiki Bertens (Netherlands) Demi Schuurs	(Croatia) Ana Konjuh (Ukraine) Lesia Tsurenko	(Russia) Evgeniya Rodina (Netherlands) Arantxa Rus (Germany) Carina Witthöft (France) Kristina Mladenovic
19 Jun	Birmingham Classic; Birmingham, Great Britain; WTA Premier; Grass – $885,040 – 32S/32Q/16D; Singles – Doubles	(Czech Republic) Petra Kvitová; 4–6, 6–3, 6–2	(Australia) Ashleigh Barty	(Czech Republic) Lucie Šafářová (Spain) Garbiñe Muguruza	(Australia) Daria Gavrilova (France) Kristina Mladenovic (United States) CoCo Vandeweghe (Italy) Camila Giorgi
19 Jun	Birmingham Classic; Birmingham, Great Britain; WTA Premier; Grass – $885,040 – 32S/32Q/16D; Singles – Doubles	(Australia) Ashleigh Barty (Australia) Casey Dellacqua; 6–1, 2–6, [10–8]	(Chinese Taipei) Chan Hao-ching (China) Zhang Shuai	(Czech Republic) Lucie Šafářová (Spain) Garbiñe Muguruza	(Australia) Daria Gavrilova (France) Kristina Mladenovic (United States) CoCo Vandeweghe (Italy) Camila Giorgi
19 Jun	Mallorca Open; Santa Ponsa, Spain; WTA International; Grass – $250,000 – 32S/24Q/16D; Singles – Doubles	(Latvia) Anastasija Sevastova; 6–4, 3–6, 6–3	(Germany) Julia Görges	(United States) Catherine Bellis (France) Caroline Garcia	(Germany) Sabine Lisicki (Czech Republic) Kristýna Plíšková (Italy) Roberta Vinci (Croatia) Ana Konjuh
19 Jun	Mallorca Open; Santa Ponsa, Spain; WTA International; Grass – $250,000 – 32S/24Q/16D; Singles – Doubles	(Chinese Taipei) Chan Yung-jan (Switzerland) Martina Hingis; Walkover	(Serbia) Jelena Janković (Latvia) Anastasija Sevastova	(United States) Catherine Bellis (France) Caroline Garcia	(Germany) Sabine Lisicki (Czech Republic) Kristýna Plíšková (Italy) Roberta Vinci (Croatia) Ana Konjuh
26 Jun	Eastbourne International; Eastbourne, Great Britain; WTA Premier; Grass – $819,000 – 48S/24Q/16D; Singles – Doubles	(Czech Republic) Karolína Plíšková; 6–4, 6–4	(Denmark) Caroline Wozniacki	(United Kingdom) Johanna Konta (United Kingdom) Heather Watson	(Germany) Angelique Kerber (Russia) Svetlana Kuznetsova (Czech Republic) Barbora Strýcová (Romania) Simona Halep
26 Jun	Eastbourne International; Eastbourne, Great Britain; WTA Premier; Grass – $819,000 – 48S/24Q/16D; Singles – Doubles	(Chinese Taipei) Chan Yung-jan (Switzerland) Martina Hingis; 6–3, 7–5	(Australia) Ashleigh Barty (Australia) Casey Dellacqua	(United Kingdom) Johanna Konta (United Kingdom) Heather Watson	(Germany) Angelique Kerber (Russia) Svetlana Kuznetsova (Czech Republic) Barbora Strýcová (Romania) Simona Halep

=== July ===
Week	Tournament	Champions	Runners-up	Semifinalists	Quarterfinalists
3 Jul; 10 Jul	The Championships, Wimbledon; London, Great Britain; Grand Slam; Grass – £14,814,000; 128S/96Q/64D/16Q/48X; Singles – Doubles – Mixed doubles	(Spain) Garbiñe Muguruza; 7–5, 6–0	(United States) Venus Williams	(Slovakia) Magdaléna Rybáriková (United Kingdom) Johanna Konta	(Russia) Svetlana Kuznetsova (United States) CoCo Vandeweghe (Latvia) Jeļena Ostapenko (Romania) Simona Halep
3 Jul; 10 Jul	The Championships, Wimbledon; London, Great Britain; Grand Slam; Grass – £14,814,000; 128S/96Q/64D/16Q/48X; Singles – Doubles – Mixed doubles	(Russia) Ekaterina Makarova (Russia) Elena Vesnina; 6–0, 6–0	(Chinese Taipei) Chan Hao-ching (Romania) Monica Niculescu	(Slovakia) Magdaléna Rybáriková (United Kingdom) Johanna Konta	(Russia) Svetlana Kuznetsova (United States) CoCo Vandeweghe (Latvia) Jeļena Ostapenko (Romania) Simona Halep
3 Jul; 10 Jul	The Championships, Wimbledon; London, Great Britain; Grand Slam; Grass – £14,814,000; 128S/96Q/64D/16Q/48X; Singles – Doubles – Mixed doubles	(Switzerland) Martina Hingis (United Kingdom) Jamie Murray; 6–4, 6–4	(United Kingdom) Heather Watson (Finland) Henri Kontinen	(Slovakia) Magdaléna Rybáriková (United Kingdom) Johanna Konta	(Russia) Svetlana Kuznetsova (United States) CoCo Vandeweghe (Latvia) Jeļena Ostapenko (Romania) Simona Halep
17 Jul	Bucharest Open; Bucharest, Romania; WTA International; Clay (red) – $250,000 – 32S/32Q/16D; Singles – Doubles	(Romania) Irina-Camelia Begu; 6–3, 7–5	(Germany) Julia Görges	(Romania) Ana Bogdan (Spain) Carla Suárez Navarro	(Latvia) Anastasija Sevastova (Romania) Alexandra Dulgheru (France) Pauline Parmentier (Germany) Tatjana Maria
17 Jul	Bucharest Open; Bucharest, Romania; WTA International; Clay (red) – $250,000 – 32S/32Q/16D; Singles – Doubles	(Romania) Irina-Camelia Begu (Romania) Raluca Olaru; 6–3, 6–3	(Belgium) Elise Mertens (Netherlands) Demi Schuurs	(Romania) Ana Bogdan (Spain) Carla Suárez Navarro	(Latvia) Anastasija Sevastova (Romania) Alexandra Dulgheru (France) Pauline Parmentier (Germany) Tatjana Maria
17 Jul	Swiss Open; Gstaad, Switzerland; WTA International; Clay (red) – $250,000 – 32S/24Q/16D; Singles – Doubles	(Netherlands) Kiki Bertens; 6–4, 3–6, 6–1	(Estonia) Anett Kontaveit	(Czech Republic) Tereza Martincová (Spain) Sara Sorribes Tormo	(Germany) Antonia Lottner (Germany) Carina Witthöft (Germany) Tamara Korpatsch (Sweden) Johanna Larsson
17 Jul	Swiss Open; Gstaad, Switzerland; WTA International; Clay (red) – $250,000 – 32S/24Q/16D; Singles – Doubles	(Netherlands) Kiki Bertens (Sweden) Johanna Larsson; 7–6^{(7–4)}, 4–6, [10–7]	(Switzerland) Viktorija Golubic (Serbia) Nina Stojanović	(Czech Republic) Tereza Martincová (Spain) Sara Sorribes Tormo	(Germany) Antonia Lottner (Germany) Carina Witthöft (Germany) Tamara Korpatsch (Sweden) Johanna Larsson
24 Jul	Swedish Open; Båstad, Sweden; WTA International; Clay (red) – $250,000 – 32S/24Q/16D; Singles – Doubles	(Czech Republic) Kateřina Siniaková; 6–3, 6–4	(Denmark) Caroline Wozniacki	(Belgium) Elise Mertens (France) Caroline Garcia	(Ukraine) Kateryna Kozlova (Serbia) Aleksandra Krunić (Czech Republic) Barbora Krejčíková (Latvia) Anastasija Sevastova
24 Jul	Swedish Open; Båstad, Sweden; WTA International; Clay (red) – $250,000 – 32S/24Q/16D; Singles – Doubles	(Netherlands) Quirine Lemoine (Netherlands) Arantxa Rus; 3–6, 6–3, [10–8]	(Argentina) María Irigoyen (Czech Republic) Barbora Krejčíková	(Belgium) Elise Mertens (France) Caroline Garcia	(Ukraine) Kateryna Kozlova (Serbia) Aleksandra Krunić (Czech Republic) Barbora Krejčíková (Latvia) Anastasija Sevastova
24 Jul	Jiangxi Open; Nanchang, China; WTA International; Hard – $250,000 – 32S/24Q/16D; Singles – Doubles	(China) Peng Shuai; 6–3, 6–2	(Japan) Nao Hibino	(China) Wang Yafan (China) Han Xinyun	(Chinese Taipei) Hsieh Su-wei (China) Lu Jingjing (Australia) Arina Rodionova (China) Zhu Lin
24 Jul	Jiangxi Open; Nanchang, China; WTA International; Hard – $250,000 – 32S/24Q/16D; Singles – Doubles	(China) Jiang Xinyu (China) Tang Qianhui; 6–3, 6–2	(Russia) Alla Kudryavtseva (Australia) Arina Rodionova	(China) Wang Yafan (China) Han Xinyun	(Chinese Taipei) Hsieh Su-wei (China) Lu Jingjing (Australia) Arina Rodionova (China) Zhu Lin
31 Jul	Stanford Classic; Stanford, United States; WTA Premier; Hard – $776,000 – 28S/16Q/16D; Singles – Doubles	(United States) Madison Keys; 7–6 ^{(7–4)}, 6–4	(United States) CoCo Vandeweghe	(Spain) Garbiñe Muguruza (United States) Catherine Bellis	(Croatia) Ana Konjuh (Ukraine) Lesia Tsurenko (Russia) Anastasia Pavlyuchenkova (Czech Republic) Petra Kvitová
31 Jul	Stanford Classic; Stanford, United States; WTA Premier; Hard – $776,000 – 28S/16Q/16D; Singles – Doubles	(United States) Abigail Spears (United States) CoCo Vandeweghe; 6–2, 6–3	(France) Alizé Cornet (Poland) Alicja Rosolska	(Spain) Garbiñe Muguruza (United States) Catherine Bellis	(Croatia) Ana Konjuh (Ukraine) Lesia Tsurenko (Russia) Anastasia Pavlyuchenkova (Czech Republic) Petra Kvitová
31 Jul	Washington Open; Washington, D.C., United States; WTA International; Hard – $250,000 – 32S/16Q/16D; Singles – Doubles	(Russia) Ekaterina Makarova; 3–6, 7–6^{(7–2)}, 6–0	(Germany) Julia Görges	(France) Océane Dodin (Germany) Andrea Petkovic	(Romania) Simona Halep (Germany) Sabine Lisicki (Romania) Monica Niculescu (Canada) Bianca Andreescu
31 Jul	Washington Open; Washington, D.C., United States; WTA International; Hard – $250,000 – 32S/16Q/16D; Singles – Doubles	(Japan) Shuko Aoyama (Czech Republic) Renata Voráčová; 6–3, 6–2	(Canada) Eugenie Bouchard (United States) Sloane Stephens	(France) Océane Dodin (Germany) Andrea Petkovic	(Romania) Simona Halep (Germany) Sabine Lisicki (Romania) Monica Niculescu (Canada) Bianca Andreescu

=== August ===
Week	Tournament	Champions	Runners-up	Semifinalists	Quarterfinalists
7 Aug	Canadian Open; Toronto, Canada; WTA Premier 5 Hard – $2,735,139 – 56S/48Q/28D; Singles – Doubles	(Ukraine) Elina Svitolina; 6–4, 6–0	(Denmark) Caroline Wozniacki	(United States) Sloane Stephens (Romania) Simona Halep	(Czech Republic) Karolína Plíšková (Czech Republic) Lucie Šafářová (Spain) Garbiñe Muguruza (France) Caroline Garcia
7 Aug	Canadian Open; Toronto, Canada; WTA Premier 5 Hard – $2,735,139 – 56S/48Q/28D; Singles – Doubles	(Russia) Ekaterina Makarova (Russia) Elena Vesnina; 6–0, 6–4	(Germany) Anna-Lena Grönefeld (Czech Republic) Květa Peschke	(United States) Sloane Stephens (Romania) Simona Halep	(Czech Republic) Karolína Plíšková (Czech Republic) Lucie Šafářová (Spain) Garbiñe Muguruza (France) Caroline Garcia
14 Aug	Cincinnati Open; Mason, United States; WTA Premier 5 Hard – $2,836,904 – 56S/48Q/28D; Singles – Doubles	(Spain) Garbiñe Muguruza; 6–1, 6–0	(Romania) Simona Halep	(Czech Republic) Karolína Plíšková (United States) Sloane Stephens	(Denmark) Caroline Wozniacki (Russia) Svetlana Kuznetsova (Germany) Julia Görges (United Kingdom) Johanna Konta
14 Aug	Cincinnati Open; Mason, United States; WTA Premier 5 Hard – $2,836,904 – 56S/48Q/28D; Singles – Doubles	(Chinese Taipei) Chan Yung-jan (Switzerland) Martina Hingis; 4–6, 6–4, [10–7]	(Chinese Taipei) Hsieh Su-wei (Romania) Monica Niculescu	(Czech Republic) Karolína Plíšková (United States) Sloane Stephens	(Denmark) Caroline Wozniacki (Russia) Svetlana Kuznetsova (Germany) Julia Görges (United Kingdom) Johanna Konta
21 Aug	Connecticut Open; New Haven, United States; WTA Premier; Hard – $776,000 – 30S/48Q/16D; Singles – Doubles	(Australia) Daria Gavrilova; 4–6, 6–3, 6–4	(Slovakia) Dominika Cibulková	(Poland) Agnieszka Radwańska (Belgium) Elise Mertens	(China) Peng Shuai (Belgium) Kirsten Flipkens (China) Zhang Shuai (Russia) Anastasia Pavlyuchenkova
21 Aug	Connecticut Open; New Haven, United States; WTA Premier; Hard – $776,000 – 30S/48Q/16D; Singles – Doubles	(Canada) Gabriela Dabrowski (China) Xu Yifan; 3–6, 6–3, [10–8]	(Australia) Ashleigh Barty (Australia) Casey Dellacqua	(Poland) Agnieszka Radwańska (Belgium) Elise Mertens	(China) Peng Shuai (Belgium) Kirsten Flipkens (China) Zhang Shuai (Russia) Anastasia Pavlyuchenkova
28 Aug; 4 Sep	US Open; New York City, United States; Grand Slam; Hard – $24,193,400; 128S/128Q/64D/32X; Singles – Doubles – Mixed doubles	(United States) Sloane Stephens; 6–3, 6–0	(United States) Madison Keys	(United States) CoCo Vandeweghe (United States) Venus Williams	(Czech Republic) Karolína Plíšková (Estonia) Kaia Kanepi (Czech Republic) Petra Kvitová (Latvia) Anastasija Sevastova
28 Aug; 4 Sep	US Open; New York City, United States; Grand Slam; Hard – $24,193,400; 128S/128Q/64D/32X; Singles – Doubles – Mixed doubles	(Chinese Taipei) Chan Yung-jan (Switzerland) Martina Hingis; 6–3, 6–2	(Czech Republic) Lucie Hradecká (Czech Republic) Kateřina Siniaková	(United States) CoCo Vandeweghe (United States) Venus Williams	(Czech Republic) Karolína Plíšková (Estonia) Kaia Kanepi (Czech Republic) Petra Kvitová (Latvia) Anastasija Sevastova
28 Aug; 4 Sep	US Open; New York City, United States; Grand Slam; Hard – $24,193,400; 128S/128Q/64D/32X; Singles – Doubles – Mixed doubles	(Switzerland) Martina Hingis (United Kingdom) Jamie Murray; 6–1, 4–6, [10–8]	(Chinese Taipei) Chan Hao-ching (New Zealand) Michael Venus	(United States) CoCo Vandeweghe (United States) Venus Williams	(Czech Republic) Karolína Plíšková (Estonia) Kaia Kanepi (Czech Republic) Petra Kvitová (Latvia) Anastasija Sevastova

=== September ===
Week	Tournament	Champions	Runners-up	Semifinalists	Quarterfinalists
11 Sep	Tournoi de Québec; Quebec City, Canada; WTA International; Carpet (i) – $250,000 – 32S/24Q/16D; Singles – Doubles	(Belgium) Alison Van Uytvanck; 5–7, 6–4, 6–1	(Hungary) Tímea Babos	(Czech Republic) Lucie Šafářová (Germany) Tatjana Maria	(Czech Republic) Lucie Hradecká (Canada) Françoise Abanda (United States) Sachia Vickery (United States) Caroline Dolehide
11 Sep	Tournoi de Québec; Quebec City, Canada; WTA International; Carpet (i) – $250,000 – 32S/24Q/16D; Singles – Doubles	(Hungary) Tímea Babos (Czech Republic) Andrea Hlaváčková; 6–3, 6–1	(Canada) Bianca Andreescu (Canada) Carson Branstine	(Czech Republic) Lucie Šafářová (Germany) Tatjana Maria	(Czech Republic) Lucie Hradecká (Canada) Françoise Abanda (United States) Sachia Vickery (United States) Caroline Dolehide
11 Sep	Japan Women's Open; Tokyo, Japan; WTA International; Hard – $250,000 – 32S/32Q/16D; Singles – Doubles	(Kazakhstan) Zarina Diyas; 6–2, 7–5	(Japan) Miyu Kato	(Croatia) Jana Fett (United States) Christina McHale	(China) Wang Qiang (Serbia) Aleksandra Krunić (Belgium) Elise Mertens (Kazakhstan) Yulia Putintseva
11 Sep	Japan Women's Open; Tokyo, Japan; WTA International; Hard – $250,000 – 32S/32Q/16D; Singles – Doubles	(Japan) Shuko Aoyama (China) Yang Zhaoxuan; 6–0, 2–6, [10–5]	(Australia) Monique Adamczak (Australia) Storm Sanders	(Croatia) Jana Fett (United States) Christina McHale	(China) Wang Qiang (Serbia) Aleksandra Krunić (Belgium) Elise Mertens (Kazakhstan) Yulia Putintseva
18 Sep	Pan Pacific Open; Tokyo, Japan; WTA Premier; Hard – $1,000,000 – 28S/32Q/16D; Singles – Doubles	(Denmark) Caroline Wozniacki; 6–0, 7–5	(Russia) Anastasia Pavlyuchenkova	(Spain) Garbiñe Muguruza (Germany) Angelique Kerber	(France) Caroline Garcia (Slovakia) Dominika Cibulková (Czech Republic) Barbora Strýcová (Czech Republic) Karolína Plíšková
18 Sep	Pan Pacific Open; Tokyo, Japan; WTA Premier; Hard – $1,000,000 – 28S/32Q/16D; Singles – Doubles	(Slovenia) Andreja Klepač (Spain) María José Martínez Sánchez; 6–3, 6–2	(Australia) Daria Gavrilova (Russia) Daria Kasatkina	(Spain) Garbiñe Muguruza (Germany) Angelique Kerber	(France) Caroline Garcia (Slovakia) Dominika Cibulková (Czech Republic) Barbora Strýcová (Czech Republic) Karolína Plíšková
18 Sep	Korea Open; Seoul, South Korea; WTA International; Hard – $250,000 – 32S/32Q/16D; Singles – Doubles	(Latvia) Jeļena Ostapenko; 6–7^{(5–7)}, 6–1, 6–4	(Brazil) Beatriz Haddad Maia	(Thailand) Luksika Kumkhum (Netherlands) Richèl Hogenkamp	(Paraguay) Verónica Cepede Royg (Romania) Sorana Cîrstea (Spain) Sara Sorribes Tormo (Australia) Priscilla Hon
18 Sep	Korea Open; Seoul, South Korea; WTA International; Hard – $250,000 – 32S/32Q/16D; Singles – Doubles	(Netherlands) Kiki Bertens (Sweden) Johanna Larsson; 6–4, 6–1	(Thailand) Luksika Kumkhum (Thailand) Peangtarn Plipuech	(Thailand) Luksika Kumkhum (Netherlands) Richèl Hogenkamp	(Paraguay) Verónica Cepede Royg (Romania) Sorana Cîrstea (Spain) Sara Sorribes Tormo (Australia) Priscilla Hon
18 Sep	Guangzhou Open; Guangzhou, China; WTA International; Hard – $250,000 – 32S/24Q/16D; Singles – Doubles	(China) Zhang Shuai; 6–2, 3–6, 6–2	(Serbia) Aleksandra Krunić	(Belgium) Yanina Wickmayer (Russia) Evgeniya Rodina	(France) Alizé Cornet (Sweden) Rebecca Peterson (Australia) Lizette Cabrera (Ukraine) Kateryna Kozlova
18 Sep	Guangzhou Open; Guangzhou, China; WTA International; Hard – $250,000 – 32S/24Q/16D; Singles – Doubles	(Belgium) Elise Mertens (Netherlands) Demi Schuurs; 6–2, 6–3	(Australia) Monique Adamczak (Australia) Storm Sanders	(Belgium) Yanina Wickmayer (Russia) Evgeniya Rodina	(France) Alizé Cornet (Sweden) Rebecca Peterson (Australia) Lizette Cabrera (Ukraine) Kateryna Kozlova
25 Sep	Wuhan Open; Wuhan, China; WTA Premier 5 Hard – $2,666,000 – 56S/32Q/28D; Singles – Doubles	(France) Caroline Garcia; 6–7^{(3–7)}, 7–6^{(7–4)}, 6–2	(Australia) Ashleigh Barty	(Latvia) Jeļena Ostapenko (Greece) Maria Sakkari	(Spain) Garbiñe Muguruza (Czech Republic) Karolína Plíšková (France) Alizé Cornet (Russia) Ekaterina Makarova
25 Sep	Wuhan Open; Wuhan, China; WTA Premier 5 Hard – $2,666,000 – 56S/32Q/28D; Singles – Doubles	(Chinese Taipei) Chan Yung-jan (Switzerland) Martina Hingis; 7–6^{(7–5)}, 3–6, [10–4]	(Japan) Shuko Aoyama (China) Yang Zhaoxuan	(Latvia) Jeļena Ostapenko (Greece) Maria Sakkari	(Spain) Garbiñe Muguruza (Czech Republic) Karolína Plíšková (France) Alizé Cornet (Russia) Ekaterina Makarova
25 Sep	Tashkent Open; Tashkent, Uzbekistan; WTA International; Hard – $250,000 – 32S/16Q/16D; Singles – Doubles	(Ukraine) Kateryna Bondarenko; 6–4, 6–4	(Hungary) Tímea Babos	(Russia) Vera Zvonareva (Belarus) Aryna Sabalenka	(Japan) Kurumi Nara (Serbia) Aleksandra Krunić (Ukraine) Kateryna Kozlova (Switzerland) Stefanie Vögele
25 Sep	Tashkent Open; Tashkent, Uzbekistan; WTA International; Hard – $250,000 – 32S/16Q/16D; Singles – Doubles	(Hungary) Tímea Babos (Czech Republic) Andrea Hlaváčková; 7–5, 6–4	(Japan) Nao Hibino (Georgia (country)) Oksana Kalashnikova	(Russia) Vera Zvonareva (Belarus) Aryna Sabalenka	(Japan) Kurumi Nara (Serbia) Aleksandra Krunić (Ukraine) Kateryna Kozlova (Switzerland) Stefanie Vögele

=== October ===
Week	Tournament	Champions	Runners-up	Semifinalists	Quarterfinalists
2 Oct	China Open; Beijing, China; WTA Premier Mandatory; Hard – $6,289,521 – 61S/32Q/28D; Singles – Doubles	(France) Caroline Garcia; 6–4, 7–6^{(7–3)}	(Romania) Simona Halep	(Czech Republic) Petra Kvitová (Latvia) Jeļena Ostapenko	(Czech Republic) Barbora Strýcová (Ukraine) Elina Svitolina (Romania) Sorana Cîrstea (Russia) Daria Kasatkina
2 Oct	China Open; Beijing, China; WTA Premier Mandatory; Hard – $6,289,521 – 61S/32Q/28D; Singles – Doubles	(Chinese Taipei) Chan Yung-jan (Switzerland) Martina Hingis; 6–1, 6–4	(Hungary) Tímea Babos (Czech Republic) Andrea Hlaváčková	(Czech Republic) Petra Kvitová (Latvia) Jeļena Ostapenko	(Czech Republic) Barbora Strýcová (Ukraine) Elina Svitolina (Romania) Sorana Cîrstea (Russia) Daria Kasatkina
9 Oct	Tianjin Open; Tianjin, China; WTA International; Hard – $500,000 – 32S/24Q/16D; Singles – Doubles	(Russia) Maria Sharapova; 7–5, 7–6^{(10–8)}	(Belarus) Aryna Sabalenka	(China) Peng Shuai (Italy) Sara Errani	(Switzerland) Stefanie Vögele (Spain) Sara Sorribes Tormo (United States) Christina McHale (China) Zhu Lin
9 Oct	Tianjin Open; Tianjin, China; WTA International; Hard – $500,000 – 32S/24Q/16D; Singles – Doubles	(Romania) Irina-Camelia Begu (Italy) Sara Errani; 6–4, 6–3	(Slovenia) Dalila Jakupović (Serbia) Nina Stojanović	(China) Peng Shuai (Italy) Sara Errani	(Switzerland) Stefanie Vögele (Spain) Sara Sorribes Tormo (United States) Christina McHale (China) Zhu Lin
9 Oct	Hong Kong Open; Hong Kong; WTA International; Hard – $250,000 – 32S/24Q/16D; Singles – Doubles	(Russia) Anastasia Pavlyuchenkova; 5–7, 6–3, 7–6^{(7–3)}	(Australia) Daria Gavrilova	(United States) Jennifer Brady (China) Wang Qiang	(United States) Nicole Gibbs (Australia) Lizette Cabrera (Australia) Samantha Stosur (Japan) Naomi Osaka
9 Oct	Hong Kong Open; Hong Kong; WTA International; Hard – $250,000 – 32S/24Q/16D; Singles – Doubles	(Chinese Taipei) Chan Hao-ching (Chinese Taipei) Chan Yung-jan; 6–1, 6–1	(China) Lu Jiajing (China) Wang Qiang	(United States) Jennifer Brady (China) Wang Qiang	(United States) Nicole Gibbs (Australia) Lizette Cabrera (Australia) Samantha Stosur (Japan) Naomi Osaka
9 Oct	Linz Open; Linz, Austria; WTA International; Hard (i) – $250,000 – 32S/32Q/16D; Singles – Doubles	(Czech Republic) Barbora Strýcová; 6–4, 6–1	(Slovakia) Magdaléna Rybáriková	(Switzerland) Viktorija Golubic (Romania) Mihaela Buzărnescu	(Romania) Sorana Cîrstea (Sweden) Johanna Larsson (Switzerland) Belinda Bencic (Germany) Tatjana Maria
9 Oct	Linz Open; Linz, Austria; WTA International; Hard (i) – $250,000 – 32S/32Q/16D; Singles – Doubles	(Netherlands) Kiki Bertens (Sweden) Johanna Larsson; 3–6, 6–3, [10–4]	(Russia) Natela Dzalamidze (Switzerland) Xenia Knoll	(Switzerland) Viktorija Golubic (Romania) Mihaela Buzărnescu	(Romania) Sorana Cîrstea (Sweden) Johanna Larsson (Switzerland) Belinda Bencic (Germany) Tatjana Maria
16 Oct	Kremlin Cup; Moscow, Russia; WTA Premier; Hard (i) – $790,208 – 28S/32Q/16D; Singles – Doubles	(Germany) Julia Görges; 6–1, 6–2	(Russia) Daria Kasatkina	(Romania) Irina-Camelia Begu (Russia) Natalia Vikhlyantseva	(Belarus) Aliaksandra Sasnovich (Belarus) Vera Lapko (France) Alizé Cornet (Ukraine) Lesia Tsurenko
16 Oct	Kremlin Cup; Moscow, Russia; WTA Premier; Hard (i) – $790,208 – 28S/32Q/16D; Singles – Doubles	(Hungary) Tímea Babos (Czech Republic) Andrea Hlaváčková; 6–2, 3–6, [10–3]	(United States) Nicole Melichar (United Kingdom) Anna Smith	(Romania) Irina-Camelia Begu (Russia) Natalia Vikhlyantseva	(Belarus) Aliaksandra Sasnovich (Belarus) Vera Lapko (France) Alizé Cornet (Ukraine) Lesia Tsurenko
16 Oct	Luxembourg Open; Kockelscheuer, Luxembourg; WTA International; Hard (i) – $250,000 – 32S/32Q/16D; Singles – Doubles	(Germany) Carina Witthöft; 6–3, 7–5	(Puerto Rico) Monica Puig	(Belgium) Elise Mertens (France) Pauline Parmentier	(United Kingdom) Naomi Broady (United Kingdom) Heather Watson (Sweden) Johanna Larsson (Netherlands) Kiki Bertens
16 Oct	Luxembourg Open; Kockelscheuer, Luxembourg; WTA International; Hard (i) – $250,000 – 32S/32Q/16D; Singles – Doubles	(Netherlands) Lesley Kerkhove (Belarus) Lidziya Marozava; 6–7^{(4–7)}, 6–4, [10–6]	(Canada) Eugenie Bouchard (Belgium) Kirsten Flipkens	(Belgium) Elise Mertens (France) Pauline Parmentier	(United Kingdom) Naomi Broady (United Kingdom) Heather Watson (Sweden) Johanna Larsson (Netherlands) Kiki Bertens
23 Oct	WTA Finals; Singapore; Year-end championships Hard (i) – $7,000,000 – 8S (RR)/8D; Singles – Doubles	(Denmark) Caroline Wozniacki; 6–4, 6–4	(United States) Venus Williams	(Czech Republic) Karolína Plíšková (France) Caroline Garcia	Round robin (Ukraine) Elina Svitolina (Romania) Simona Halep (Latvia) Jeļena Ostapenko (Spain) Garbiñe Muguruza
23 Oct	WTA Finals; Singapore; Year-end championships Hard (i) – $7,000,000 – 8S (RR)/8D; Singles – Doubles	(Hungary) Tímea Babos (Czech Republic) Andrea Hlaváčková; 4–6, 6–4, [10–5]	(Netherlands) Kiki Bertens (Sweden) Johanna Larsson	(Czech Republic) Karolína Plíšková (France) Caroline Garcia	Round robin (Ukraine) Elina Svitolina (Romania) Simona Halep (Latvia) Jeļena Ostapenko (Spain) Garbiñe Muguruza
30 Oct	WTA Elite Trophy; Zhuhai, China; Year-end championships Hard – $2,280,935 – 12S (RR)/6D (RR); Singles – Doubles	(Germany) Julia Görges; 7–5, 6–1	(United States) CoCo Vandeweghe	(Australia) Ashleigh Barty (Latvia) Anastasija Sevastova	Round robin (Slovakia) Magdaléna Rybáriková (France) Kristina Mladenovic (China) Peng Shuai (Russia) Elena Vesnina (Czech Republic) Barbora Strýcová (United States) Sloane Stephens (Russia) Anastasia Pavlyuchenkova (Germany) Angelique Kerber
30 Oct	WTA Elite Trophy; Zhuhai, China; Year-end championships Hard – $2,280,935 – 12S (RR)/6D (RR); Singles – Doubles	(China) Duan Yingying (China) Han Xinyun; 6–2, 6–1	(China) Lu Jingjing (China) Zhang Shuai	(Australia) Ashleigh Barty (Latvia) Anastasija Sevastova	Round robin (Slovakia) Magdaléna Rybáriková (France) Kristina Mladenovic (China) Peng Shuai (Russia) Elena Vesnina (Czech Republic) Barbora Strýcová (United States) Sloane Stephens (Russia) Anastasia Pavlyuchenkova (Germany) Angelique Kerber

=== November ===
Week	Tournament	Champions	Runners-up	Semifinalists	Quarterfinalists
11–12 Nov	Fed Cup Final; Minsk, Belarus – hard (i)	United States; 3–2	Belarus		

== Statistical information ==
These tables present the number of singles (S), doubles (D), and mixed doubles (X) titles won by each player and each nation during the season, within all the tournament categories of the 2017 WTA Tour: the Grand Slam tournaments, the year-end championships (the WTA Tour Championships and the Tournament of Champions), the WTA Premier tournaments (Premier Mandatory, Premier 5, and regular Premier), and the WTA International tournaments. The players/nations are sorted by: 1) total number of titles (a doubles title won by two players representing the same nation counts as only one win for the nation); 2) cumulated importance of those titles (one Grand Slam win equalling two Premier Mandatory/Premier 5 wins, one year-end championships win equalling one-and-a-half Premier Mandatory/Premier 5 win, one Premier Mandatory/Premier 5 win equalling two Premier wins, one Premier win equalling two International wins); 3) a singles > doubles > mixed doubles hierarchy; 4) alphabetical order (by family names for players).

=== Key ===
Grand Slam tournaments
Year-end championships
WTA Premier Mandatory
WTA Premier 5
WTA Premier
WTA International

=== Titles won by player ===
Total	Player	Grand Slam			Year-end		Premier Mandatory		Premier 5		Premier		International		Total		
Total	Player	S	D	X	S	D	S	D	S	D	S	D	S	D	S	D	X
11	Martina Hingis (SUI)		●	● ●				● ● ●		● ● ●		●		●	0	9	2
11	Chan Yung-jan (TPE)		●					● ● ●		● ● ●		●		● ● ●	0	11	0
7	Tímea Babos (HUN)					●						● ●	●	● ● ●	1	6	0
6	Andrea Hlaváčková (CZE)					●						●		● ● ● ●	0	6	0
6	Kiki Bertens (NED)												● ●	● ● ● ●	2	4	0
5	Elina Svitolina (UKR)								● ● ●				● ●		5	0	0
4	Bethanie Mattek-Sands (USA)		● ●									● ●			0	4	0
4	Jeļena Ostapenko (LAT)	●										● ●	●		2	2	0
4	Elena Vesnina (RUS)		●				●			● ●					1	3	0
4	Ekaterina Makarova (RUS)		●							● ●			●		1	3	0
4	Anastasia Pavlyuchenkova (RUS)											●	● ● ●		3	1	0
4	Ashleigh Barty (AUS)											●	●	● ●	1	3	0
4	Johanna Larsson (SWE)													● ● ● ●	0	4	0
3	Lucie Šafářová (CZE)		● ●									●			0	3	0
3	Gabriela Dabrowski (CAN)			●				●				●			0	2	1
3	Abigail Spears (USA)			●								● ●			0	2	1
3	Karolína Plíšková (CZE)										● ● ●				3	0	0
3	Casey Dellacqua (AUS)											●		● ●	0	3	0
3	Irina-Camelia Begu (ROU)												●	● ●	1	2	0
2	Garbiñe Muguruza (ESP)	●							●						2	0	0
2	Julia Görges (GER)				●						●				2	0	0
2	Caroline Wozniacki (DEN)				●						●				2	0	0
2	Caroline Garcia (FRA)						●		●						2	0	0
2	Johanna Konta (GBR)						●				●				2	0	0
2	Xu Yifan (CHN)							●				●			0	2	0
2	Alicja Rosolska (POL)											●		●	0	2	0
2	Kateřina Siniaková (CZE)												● ●		2	0	0
2	Elise Mertens (BEL)												●	●	1	1	0
2	Peng Shuai (CHN)												●	●	1	1	0
2	Shuko Aoyama (JPN)													● ●	0	2	0
2	Chan Hao-ching (TPE)													● ●	0	2	0
2	Hsieh Su-wei (TPE)													● ●	0	2	0
2	Raluca Olaru (ROU)													● ●	0	2	0
1	Sloane Stephens (USA)	●													1	0	0
1	Serena Williams (USA)	●													1	0	0
1	Duan Yingying (CHN)					●									0	1	0
1	Han Xinyun (CHN)					●									0	1	0
1	Simona Halep (ROU)						●								1	0	0
1	Daria Gavrilova (AUS)										●				1	0	0
1	Daria Kasatkina (RUS)										●				1	0	0
1	Madison Keys (USA)										●				1	0	0
1	Petra Kvitová (CZE)										●				1	0	0
1	Kristina Mladenovic (FRA)										●				1	0	0
1	Laura Siegemund (GER)										●				1	0	0
1	Raquel Atawo (USA)											●			0	1	0
1	Andreja Klepač (SLO)											●			0	1	0
1	María José Martínez Sánchez (ESP)											●			0	1	0
1	Sania Mirza (IND)											●			0	1	0
1	Katarina Srebotnik (SLO)											●			0	1	0
1	Coco Vandeweghe (USA)											●			0	1	0
1	Mona Barthel (GER)												●		1	0	0
1	Kateryna Bondarenko (UKR)												●		1	0	0
1	Lauren Davis (USA)												●		1	0	0
1	Zarina Diyas (KAZ)												●		1	0	0
1	Anett Kontaveit (EST)												●		1	0	0
1	Francesca Schiavone (ITA)												●		1	0	0
1	Anastasija Sevastova (LAT)												●		1	0	0
1	Maria Sharapova (RUS)												●		1	0	0
1	Samantha Stosur (AUS)												●		1	0	0
1	Barbora Strýcová (CZE)												●		1	0	0
1	Lesia Tsurenko (UKR)												●		1	0	0
1	Alison Van Uytvanck (BEL)												●		1	0	0
1	Donna Vekić (CRO)												●		1	0	0
1	Markéta Vondroušová (CZE)												●		1	0	0
1	Carina Witthöft (GER)												●		1	0	0
1	Zhang Shuai (CHN)												●		1	0	0
1	Monique Adamczak (AUS)													●	0	1	0
1	Dominika Cibulková (SVK)													●	0	1	0
1	Sara Errani (ITA)													●	0	1	0
1	Kirsten Flipkens (BEL)													●	0	1	0
1	Anna-Lena Grönefeld (GER)													●	0	1	0
1	Beatriz Haddad Maia (BRA)													●	0	1	0
1	Nao Hibino (JPN)													●	0	1	0
1	Dalila Jakupović (SLO)													●	0	1	0
1	Jiang Xinyu (CHN)													●	0	1	0
1	Darija Jurak (CRO)													●	0	1	0
1	Oksana Kalashnikova (GEO)													●	0	1	0
1	Lesley Kerkhove (NED)													●	0	1	0
1	Nadiia Kichenok (UKR)													●	0	1	0
1	Quirine Lemoine (NED)													●	0	1	0
1	Lidziya Marozava (BLR)													●	0	1	0
1	Nicole Melichar (USA)													●	0	1	0
1	Monica Niculescu (ROU)													●	0	1	0
1	Květa Peschke (CZE)													●	0	1	0
1	Nadia Podoroska (ARG)													●	0	1	0
1	Anastasia Rodionova (AUS)													●	0	1	0
1	Arantxa Rus (NED)													●	0	1	0
1	Storm Sanders (AUS)													●	0	1	0
1	Olga Savchuk (UKR)													●	0	1	0
1	Demi Schuurs (NED)													●	0	1	0
1	Anna Smith (GBR)													●	0	1	0
1	Tang Qianhui (CHN)													●	0	1	0
1	Renata Voráčová (CZE)													●	0	1	0
1	Yang Zhaoxuan (CHN)													●	0	1	0

=== Titles won by nation ===
Total	Nation	Grand Slam			Year-end		Premier Mandatory		Premier 5		Premier		International		Total		
Total	Nation	S	D	X	S	D	S	D	S	D	S	D	S	D	S	D	X
19	Czech Republic (CZE)		2			1					4	2	4	6	8	11	0
13	United States (USA)	2	2	1							1	5	1	1	4	8	1
13	Chinese Taipei (TPE)		1					3		3		1		5	0	13	0
11	Switzerland (SUI)		1	2				3		3		1		1	0	9	2
11	Russia (RUS)		1				1			2	1	1	5		7	4	0
9	Ukraine (UKR)								3				4	2	7	2	0
9	Netherlands (NED)												2	7	2	7	0
8	China (CHN)					1		1				1	2	3	2	6	0
8	Australia (AUS)										1	1	2	4	3	5	0
7	Hungary (HUN)					1						2	1	3	1	6	0
6	Germany (GER)				1						2		2	1	5	1	0
6	Romania (ROU)						1						1	4	2	4	0
5	Latvia (LAT)	1										2	2		3	2	0
4	Belgium (BEL)												2	2	2	2	0
4	Sweden (SWE)													4	0	4	0
3	Spain (ESP)	1							1			1			2	1	0
3	France (FRA)						1		1		1				3	0	0
3	Canada (CAN)			1				1				1			0	2	1
3	Great Britain (GBR)						1				1			1	2	1	0
3	Slovenia (SLO)											2		1	0	3	0
3	Japan (JPN)													3	0	3	0
2	Denmark (DEN)				1						1				2	0	0
2	Poland (POL)											1		1	0	2	0
2	Croatia (CRO)												1	1	1	1	0
2	Italy (ITA)												1	1	1	1	0
1	India (IND)											1			0	1	0
1	Estonia (EST)												1		1	0	0
1	Kazakhstan (KAZ)												1		1	0	0
1	Argentina (ARG)													1	0	1	0
1	Belarus (BLR)													1	0	1	0
1	Brazil (BRA)													1	0	1	0
1	Georgia (GEO)													1	0	1	0
1	Slovakia (SVK)													1	0	1	0

=== Titles information ===
The following players won their first main circuit title in singles, doubles, or mixed doubles:

Singles

- (United States) Lauren Davis – Auckland (draw)
- (Czech Republic) Kateřina Siniaková – Shenzhen (draw)
- (Belgium) Elise Mertens – Hobart (draw)
- (France) Kristina Mladenovic – St. Petersburg (draw)
- (Australia) Ashleigh Barty – Kuala Lumpur (draw)
- (Russia) Daria Kasatkina – Charleston (draw)
- (Czech Republic) Markéta Vondroušová – Biel (draw)
- (Latvia) Jeļena Ostapenko – French Open (draw)
- (Estonia) Anett Kontaveit – 's-Hertogenbosch (draw)
- (Australia) Daria Gavrilova – New Haven (draw)
- (Kazakhstan) Zarina Diyas – Tokyo International (draw)
- (Belgium) Alison Van Uytvanck – Quebec City (draw)
- (Germany) Carina Witthöft – Luxembourg City (draw)

Doubles

- (Latvia) Jeļena Ostapenko – St. Petersburg (draw)
- (Japan) Nao Hibino – Monterrey (draw)
- (Argentina) Nadia Podoroska – Bogotá (draw)
- (Slovenia) Dalila Jakupović – Istanbul (draw)
- (United States) Nicole Melichar – Nürnberg (draw)
- (United Kingdom) Anna Smith – Nürnberg (draw)
- (Slovakia) Dominika Cibulková – 's-Hertogenbosch (draw)
- (Australia) Monique Adamczak – Nottingham (draw)
- (Australia) Storm Sanders – Nottingham (draw)
- (Netherlands) Quirine Lemoine – Båstad (draw)
- (Netherlands) Arantxa Rus – Båstad (draw)
- (China) Jiang Xinyu – Nanchang (draw)
- (China) Tang Qianhui – Nanchang (draw)
- (Netherlands) Lesley Kerkhove – Luxembourg City (draw)
- (Belarus) Lidziya Marozava – Luxembourg City (draw)
- (China) Duan Yingying – WTA Elite Trophy (draw)

Mixed doubles

- (United States) Abigail Spears – Australian Open (draw)
- (Canada) Gabriela Dabrowski – French Open (draw)

The following players defended a main circuit title in singles, doubles, or mixed doubles:

Singles

- (Romania) Simona Halep – Madrid (draw)
- (Netherlands) Kiki Bertens – Nürnberg (draw)
- (Denmark) Caroline Wozniacki – Tokyo (draw)

Doubles

- (India) Sania Mirza – Brisbane (draw)
- (Chinese Taipei) Chan Hao-ching – Taipei (draw), Hong Kong (draw)
- (Chinese Taipei) Chan Yung-jan – Taipei (draw), Hong Kong (draw)
- (Switzerland) Martina Hingis – Rome (draw)
- (United States) Abigail Spears – Stanford (draw)
- (Russia) Ekaterina Makarova – Toronto (draw)
- (Russia) Elena Vesnina – Toronto (draw)
- (Japan) Shuko Aoyama – Tokyo International (draw)
- (Czech Republic) Andrea Hlaváčková – Quebec City (draw), Moscow (draw)
- (Sweden) Johanna Larsson – Seoul (draw), Linz (draw)
- (Netherlands) Kiki Bertens – Linz (draw)

=== Top 10 entry ===
The following players entered the top 10 for the first time in their careers:

Singles

- (Ukraine) Elina Svitolina (enters at No. 10 on February 27)
- (Latvia) Jeļena Ostapenko (enters at No. 10 on September 11)
- (France) Caroline Garcia (enters at No. 9 on October 9)
- (France) Kristina Mladenovic (enters at No. 10 on October 23)
- (United States) CoCo Vandeweghe (enters at No. 10 on November 6)

Doubles

- (Czech Republic) Barbora Strýcová (enters at No. 10 on March 20)

== WTA rankings ==
These are the WTA rankings of the top 20 singles players, doubles players, and the top 10 doubles teams on the WTA Tour, at the end of the 2017 season.

=== Singles ===
WTA Championships Race Rankings, Final rankings
#	Player	Points	Move^{†}	Tourn
1	(Romania) Simona Halep	5,675	Steady	17
2	(Spain) Garbiñe Muguruza	5,635	Steady	20
3	(Czech Republic) Karolína Plíšková	5,105	Steady	19
4	(Ukraine) Elina Svitolina	5,000	Steady	18
5	(United States) Venus Williams	4,642	Steady	15
6	(Denmark) Caroline Wozniacki	4,640	Steady	22
7	(Latvia) Jeļena Ostapenko	4,510	Steady	20
8	(France) Caroline Garcia	3,795	Steady	23
9	(United Kingdom) Johanna Konta	3,610	Steady	20
10	(France) Kristina Mladenovic	2,885	Steady	25
11	(Russia) Svetlana Kuznetsova	2,856	Steady	17
12	(United States) CoCo Vandeweghe	2,819	Steady	17
13	(United States) Sloane Stephens	2,722	Steady	10
14	(Russia) Anastasia Pavlyuchenkova	2,425	Steady	25
15	(Latvia) Anastasija Sevastova	2,295	Steady	24
16	(United States) Madison Keys	2,213	Steady	14
17	(Russia) Elena Vesnina	2,195	Steady	24
18	(Germany) Julia Görges	2,060	▲10	23
19	(Germany) Angelique Kerber	2,042	▼1	21
20	(Australia) Ashleigh Barty	2,031	▼1	17

Champion

Player competed at the 2017 WTA Finals

WTA Singles Year-End Rankings
#	Player	Points	#Trn	'16 Rk	High	Low	'16→'17
1	Simona Halep (ROU)	6,175	18	4	1	8	▲3
2	Garbiñe Muguruza (ESP)	6,135	21	7	1	15	▲5
3	Caroline Wozniacki (DEN)	6,015	22	19	3	20	▲16
4	Karolína Plíšková (CZE)	5,730	20	6	1	6	▲2
5	Venus Williams (USA)	5,597	16	17	5	17	▲12
6	Elina Svitolina (UKR)	5,500	19	14	3	14	▲8
7	Jeļena Ostapenko (LAT)	5,010	21	44	7	71	▲37
8	Caroline Garcia (FRA)	4,420	24	23	8	29	▲15
9	Johanna Konta (GBR)	3,610	20	10	4	11	▲1
10	CoCo Vandeweghe (USA)	3,258	18	37	10	38	▲27
11	Kristina Mladenovic (FRA)	2,881	26	42	10	51	▲31
12	Svetlana Kuznetsova (RUS)	2,856	17	9	7	12	▼3
13	Sloane Stephens (USA)	2,802	11	36	13	957	▲23
14	Julia Görges (GER)	2,650	24	53	14	57	▲39
15	Anastasija Sevastova (LAT)	2,475	25	35	15	35	▲20
16	Anastasia Pavlyuchenkova (RUS)	2,445	26	28	14	27	▲12
17	Ashleigh Barty (AUS)	2,251	18	325	17	271	▲308
18	Elena Vesnina (RUS)	2,220	25	16	13	21	▼2
19	Madison Keys (USA)	2,213	14	8	8	21	▼11
20	Magdaléna Rybáriková (SVK)	2,141	20	156	20	453	▲136

=== Number 1 ranking ===
Holder	Date gained	Date forfeited
(Germany) Angelique Kerber	Year end 2016	29 January 2017
(United States) Serena Williams	30 January 2017	19 March 2017
(Germany) Angelique Kerber	20 March 2017	23 April 2017
(United States) Serena Williams	24 April 2017	14 May 2017
(Germany) Angelique Kerber	15 May 2017	16 July 2017
(Czech Republic) Karolína Plíšková	17 July 2017	10 September 2017
(Spain) Garbiñe Muguruza	11 September 2017	8 October 2017
(Romania) Simona Halep	9 October 2017	Year end 2017

=== Doubles ===
WTA Championships Race Rankings, Final rankings
#	Team	Points	Move^{‡}	Tourn
1	(Chinese Taipei) Chan Yung-jan (Switzerland) Martina Hingis	9,770	Steady	15
2	(Russia) Ekaterina Makarova (Russia) Elena Vesnina	6,785	Steady	14
3	(United States) Bethanie Mattek-Sands (Czech Republic) Lucie Šafářová	5,120	Steady	7
4	(Australia) Ashleigh Barty (Australia) Casey Dellacqua	4,470	Steady	16
5	(Hungary) Tímea Babos (Czech Republic) Andrea Hlaváčková	4,005	▲1	15
6	(Czech Republic) Lucie Hradecká (Czech Republic) Kateřina Siniaková	3,871	▼1	14
7	(Germany) Anna-Lena Grönefeld (Czech Republic) Květa Peschke	3,005	Steady	22
8	(Canada) Gabriela Dabrowski (China) Xu Yifan	2,921	Steady	14
9	(Czech Republic) Andrea Hlaváčková (China) Peng Shuai	2,776	Steady	7
10	(Slovenia) Andreja Klepač (Spain) María José Martínez Sánchez	2,570	Steady	23
11	(Netherlands) Kiki Bertens (Sweden) Johanna Larsson	2,270	Steady	14

Champion

Team has qualified for the 2017 WTA Finals
Team has withdrawn for the 2017 WTA Finals due to injury

WTA rankings (Doubles), Year-End Rankings
#	Player	Points	Move^{‡}
1	Chan Yung-jan (TPE)	10,130	Steady
1	Martina Hingis (SUI)	10,130	Steady
3	Ekaterina Makarova (RUS)	7,320	Steady
3	Elena Vesnina (RUS)	7,320	Steady
5	Andrea Sestini Hlaváčková (CZE)	6,885	Steady
6	Lucie Šafářová (CZE)	6,800	Steady
7	Tímea Babos (HUN)	5,600	Steady
8	Bethanie Mattek-Sands (USA)	5,591	Steady
9	Peng Shuai (CHN)	4,890	Steady
10	Casey Dellacqua (AUS)	4,715	Steady
11	Ashleigh Barty (AUS)	4,555	Steady
12	Sania Mirza (IND)	4,475	Steady
13	Kateřina Siniaková (CZE)	4,440	Steady
14	Lucie Hradecká (CZE)	3,930	Steady
15	Barbora Strýcová (CZE)	3,880	Steady
16	Yifan Xu (CHN)	3,765	Steady
17	Chan Hao-ching (TPE)	3,725	Steady
18	Gabriela Dabrowski (CAN)	3,670	Steady
19	Kiki Bertens (NED)	3,420	Steady
20	Johanna Larsson (SWE)	3,325	Steady

==== Number 1 ranking ====
Holder	Date gained	Date forfeited
(India) Sania Mirza	Year end 2016	8 January 2017
(United States) Bethanie Mattek-Sands	9 January 2017	20 August 2017
(Czech Republic) Lucie Šafářová	21 August 2017	1 October 2017
(Switzerland) Martina Hingis	2 October 2017	22 October 2017
(Switzerland) Martina Hingis (Chinese Taipei) Chan Yung-jan	23 October 2017	Year end 2017

== Prize money leaders ==
For the first time since the 2001 season, at the age of 37, Venus Williams topped the money list with $5,468,741. The top-37 players earned over $1,000,000. Martina Hingis and Yung-Jan Chan each made over $1.4 million by playing exclusively in doubles tournaments. It was the 4th consecutive year that a player earned over $1,000,000 in doubles events.

#	Player	Singles	Doubles	Mixed	Year-to-date
1	(United States) Venus Williams	$5,468,741	$0	$0	$5,468,741
2	(Spain) Garbiñe Muguruza	$5,079,898	$3,559	$0	$5,083,457
3	(Denmark) Caroline Wozniacki	$4,748,518	$0	$0	$4,748,518
4	(Romania) Simona Halep	$4,627,957	$47,270	$0	$4,675,227
5	(United States) Sloane Stephens	$4,023,466	$32,037	$938	$4,056,441
6	(Latvia) Jeļena Ostapenko	$3,861,198	$129,360	$7,468	$3,998,026
7	(Czech Republic) Karolína Plíšková	$3,432,429	$20,236	$0	$3,452,665
8	(France) Caroline Garcia	$3,351,361	$75,789	$0	$3,427,150
9	(Ukraine) Elina Svitolina	$3,225,086	$18,327	$19,903	$3,263,316
10	(United Kingdom) Johanna Konta	$2,706,385	$25,109	$0	$2,931,494
prize money given in US$; as of November 6, 2017

== Statistics leaders ==
as of October 30, 2017

Aces
	Player	Aces	Matches
1	(Czech Republic) Karolína Plíšková	452	69
2	(Germany) Julia Görges	401	64
3	(Czech Republic) Kristýna Plíšková	372	45
4	(France) Caroline Garcia	354	70
5	(Czech Republic) Lucie Šafářová	323	53
6	(France) Kristina Mladenovic	264	59
7	(Netherlands) Kiki Bertens	243	54
8	(United Kingdom) Johanna Konta	241	52
9	(United States) CoCo Vandeweghe	226	43
10	(Denmark) Caroline Wozniacki	217	81

Double Faults
	Player	DFs	Matches
1	(Latvia) Jeļena Ostapenko	380	63
2	(France) Kristina Mladenovic	324	59
3	(Russia) Anastasia Pavlyuchenkova	281	62
4	(United States) Venus Williams	273	52
5	(Australia) Daria Gavrilova	266	55
6	(Spain) Sara Sorribes Tormo	264	32
7	(Netherlands) Kiki Bertens	237	54
8	(Croatia) Mirjana Lučić-Baroni	237	36
9	(United States) Lauren Davis	236	42
10	(Germany) Julia Görges	226	64

First Serve Percentage (not updated)
	Player	%	Matches
1	(Romania) Alexandra Dulgheru	84.7	3
2	(Uzbekistan) Akgul Amanmuradova	83.8	1
3	(Romania) Monica Niculescu	82.0	22
4	(Italy) Sara Errani	78.0	27
5	(Romania) Irina Bara	77.2	2
6	(Bulgaria) Viktoriya Tomova	76.6	5
7	(Brazil) Teliana Pereira	75.0	1
8	(Israel) Julia Glushko	75.0	1
9	(Turkey) Çağla Büyükakçay	74.1	14
10	(Czech Republic) Petra Krejsová	74.0	2

Second Serve Percentage
	Player	%	Matches
1	(Latvia) Jeļena Ostapenko	47.8	63
2	(France) Océane Dodin	46.8	29
3	(United States) CoCo Vandeweghe	45.5	43
4	(Germany) Tatjana Maria	45.2	31
5	(Netherlands) Kiki Bertens	44.4	54
6	(Croatia) Donna Vekić	44.1	37
7	(Italy) Camila Giorgi	44.0	28
8	(Germany) Julia Görges	43.9	64
9	(Slovakia) Magdaléna Rybáriková	43.1	28
10	(France) Pauline Parmentier	43.0	34

First Serve Points Won
	Player	%	Matches
1	(United States) Serena Williams	79.1	9
2	(Switzerland) Amra Sadiković	75.2	2
3	(United Kingdom) Naomi Broady	74.8	17
4	(Czech Republic) Petra Kvitová	74.0	28
5	(Australia) Destanee Aiava	73.8	4
6	(United States) CoCo Vandeweghe	73.1	43
7	(Czech Republic) Lucie Hradecká	73.0	7
8	(Czech Republic) Karolína Plíšková	72.9	69
9	(Canada) Charlotte Robillard-Millette	72.7	1
10	(Germany) Julia Görges	72.6	64

Second Serve Points Won (not updated)
	Player	%	Matches
1	(China) Zheng Wushuang	64.7	1
2	(Switzerland) Patty Schnyder	58.4	2
3	(Romania) Alexandra Dulgheru	58.1	3
4	(Russia) Elena Rybakina	57.6	1
5	(Bulgaria) Elitsa Kostova	55.7	4
6	(Ukraine) Dayana Yastremska	55.4	4
7	(United States) Danielle Lao	55.3	2
8	(United States) Caroline Dolehide	54.5	4
9	(Switzerland) Amra Sadiković	54.2	2
10	(Australia) Anastasia Rodionova	53.3	3

Service Points Won (not updated)
	Player	%	Matches
1	(Switzerland) Amra Sadiković	66.5	2
2	(United States) Serena Williams	65.2	9
3	(China) Zheng Wushuang	65.1	1
4	(Czech Republic) Andrea Hlaváčková	64.7	2
5	(United Kingdom) Johanna Konta	63.5	48
6	(United States) CoCo Vandeweghe	62.9	34
7	(Australia) Ashleigh Barty	62.7	31
8	(Czech Republic) Petra Krejsová	62.5	2
9	(Czech Republic) Karolína Plíšková	62.4	52
10	(Thailand) Luksika Kumkhum	62.3	1

Return Points Won (not updated)
	Player	%	Matches
1	(United States) Sachia Vickery	57.1	5
2	(Turkey) Başak Eraydın	53.2	4
3	(Canada) Gabriela Dabrowski	52.9	2
4	(China) Wang Yafan	51.6	4
5	(Russia) Viktoria Kamenskaya	50.0	1
6	(China) Gao Xinyu	50.0	1
7	(Sweden) Mirjam Björklund	50.0	1
8	(Brazil) Teliana Pereira	50.0	1
9	(Thailand) Peangtarn Plipuech	50.0	1
10	(Australia) Anastasia Rodionova	50.0	3

Service Games Won (not updated)
	Player	%	Matches
1	(Switzerland) Amra Sadiković	84.8	2
2	(United States) Serena Williams	82.4	9
3	(United Kingdom) Johanna Konta	80.6	48
4	(Switzerland) Patty Schnyder	80.6	2
5	(China) Zheng Wushuang	80.0	1
6	(Czech Republic) Andrea Hlaváčková	79.2	2
7	(Czech Republic) Karolína Plíšková	78.6	52
8	(China) Xun Fangying	78.3	2
9	(Australia) Ashleigh Barty	77.2	31
10	(United States) CoCo Vandeweghe	77.2	34

Return Games Won (not updated)
	Player	%	Matches
1	(United States) Sachia Vickery	53.6	5
2	(Canada) Gabriela Dabrowski	52.3	2
3	(Australia) Anastasia Rodionova	51.6	3
4	(Russia) Anastasia Potapova	51.2	1
5	(Sweden) Mirjam Björklund	50.5	1
6	(China) Gao Xinyu	50.0	1
7	(Turkey) Başak Eraydın	49.5	4
8	(Russia) Alla Kudryavtseva	49.5	1
9	(China) Wang Yafan	49.5	4
10	(Romania) Alexandra Cadanțu	49.5	3

Break Points Saved (not updated)
	Player	%	Matches
1	(China) Xun Fangying	76.2	2
2	(China) Wang Yafan	74.4	4
3	(Turkey) Ayla Aksu	74.2	2
4	(Switzerland) Patty Schnyder	72.7	2
5	(United Kingdom) Tara Moore	71.4	1
6	(Russia) Viktoria Kamenskaya	70.0	1
7	(United States) Danielle Lao	68.8	1
8	(Switzerland) Amra Sadiković	66.7	2
9	(Czech Republic) Lucie Hradecká	66.7	4
10	(Sweden) Rebecca Peterson	66.7	1

Break Points Converted (not updated)
	Player	%	Matches
1	(Germany) Katharina Gerlach	100.0	1
2	(France) Alizé Lim	100.0	1
3	(Israel) Julia Glushko	85.7	1
4	(United States) Sachia Vickery	83.3	5
5	(Spain) Paula Badosa Gibert	80.0	1
6	(United States) Alexa Glatch	75.0	1
7	(Belarus) Vera Lapko	75.0	1
8	(Brazil) Teliana Pereira	71.4	1
9	(France) Chloé Paquet	71.4	3
10	(Russia) Alla Kudryavtseva	70.0	1

== Points distribution ==
Category	W	F	SF	QF	R16	R32	R64	R128	Q	Q3	Q2	Q1
Grand Slam (S)	2000	1300	780	430	240	130	70	10	40	30	20	2
Grand Slam (D)	2000	1300	780	430	240	130	10	–	40	–	–	–
WTA Finals (S)	1500*	1080*	750*	(+125 per round robin match; +125 per round robin win)								
WTA Finals (D)	1500	1080	750	375	–							
WTA Premier Mandatory (96S)	1000	650	390	215	120	65	35	10	30	–	20	2
WTA Premier Mandatory (64/60S)	1000	650	390	215	120	65	10	–	30	–	20	2
WTA Premier Mandatory (28/32D)	1000	650	390	215	120	10	–	–	–	–	–	–
WTA Premier 5 (56S, 64Q)	900	585	350	190	105	60	1	–	30	22	15	1
WTA Premier 5 (56S, 48/32Q)	900	585	350	190	105	60	1	–	30	-	20	1
WTA Premier 5 (28D)	900	585	350	190	105	1	–	–	–	–	–	–
WTA Premier 5 (16D)	900	585	350	190	1	-	–	–	–	–	–	–
WTA Premier (56S)	470	305	185	100	55	30	1	–	25	–	13	1
WTA Premier (32S)	470	305	185	100	55	1	–	–	25	18	13	1
WTA Premier (16D)	470	305	185	100	1	–	–	–	–	–	–	–
WTA Elite Trophy (S)	700*	440*	240*	(+40 per round robin match; +80 per round robin win)								
WTA International (32S, 32Q)	280	180	110	60	30	1	–	–	18	14	10	1
WTA International (32S, 24/16Q)	280	180	110	60	30	1	–	–	18	-	12	1
WTA International (16D)	280	180	110	60	1	–	–	–	–	–	–	–

S = singles players, D = doubles teams, Q = qualification players.
* Assumes undefeated round robin match record.

== WTA fan polls ==
=== Player of the month ===
Month	Player	Nationality	Other candidates
January	Serena Williams (46%)	United States	(United States) Venus Williams (42%) (United Kingdom) Johanna Konta (8%) (Czech Republic) Karolína Plíšková (4%)
February	Elina Svitolina (63%)	Ukraine	(France) Kristina Mladenovic (27%) (Czech Republic) Karolína Plíšková (10%)
March	Elena Vesnina (40%)	Russia	(United Kingdom) Johanna Konta (24%) (Denmark) Caroline Wozniacki (18%) (United States) Venus Williams (14%) (Czech Republic) Karolína Plíšková (4%)
April	Laura Siegemund (53%)	Germany	(France) Kristina Mladenovic (23%) (Russia) Daria Kasatkina (21%) (Russia) Anastasia Pavlyuchenkova (3%)
May	Simona Halep (87%)	Romania	(Latvia) Jeļena Ostapenko (9%) (Ukraine) Elina Svitolina (4%)
June	Garbiñe Muguruza (60%)	Spain	(Czech Republic) Petra Kvitová (29%) (Czech Republic) Karolína Plíšková (11%)
July	Madison Keys (36%)	United States	(Czech Republic) Kateřina Siniaková (34%) (Russia) Ekaterina Makarova (30%)
August	Sloane Stephens (63%)	United States	(United States) Venus Williams (25%) (United States) Madison Keys (10%) (United States) CoCo Vandeweghe (2%)
September	Caroline Garcia (79%)	France	(Romania) Simona Halep (13%) (Denmark) Caroline Wozniacki (8%)
October	Caroline Wozniacki (64%)	Denmark	(Romania) Simona Halep (23%) (United States) Venus Williams (13%)

=== Breakthrough of the month ===
Month	Player	Nationality	Other candidates
January	CoCo Vandeweghe (50%)	United States	(Belgium) Elise Mertens (28%) (Czech Republic) Kateřina Siniaková (16%) (United States) Lauren Davis (6%)
February	Kristina Mladenovic (56%)	France	(Ukraine) Elina Svitolina (26%) (Australia) Ashleigh Barty (12%) (United States) Catherine Bellis (6%)
March	Risa Ozaki (55%)	Japan	(United States) Kayla Day (45%)
April	Daria Kasatkina (60%)	Russia	(Czech Republic) Markéta Vondroušová (20%) (Ukraine) Dayana Yastremska (11%) (Estonia) Anett Kontaveit (9%)
May	Jeļena Ostapenko (60%)	Latvia	(Paraguay) Verónica Cepede Royg (33%) (Tunisia) Ons Jabeur (5%) (France) Caroline Garcia (2%)
June	Magdaléna Rybáriková (74%)	Slovakia	(Estonia) Anett Kontaveit (23%) (Latvia) Anastasija Sevastova (3%)
July	Bianca Andreescu (39%)	Canada	(Czech Republic) Kateřina Siniaková (38%) (United States) Catherine Bellis (23%)
August	Sofia Kenin (46%)	United States	(United States) Shelby Rogers (34%) (Russia) Daria Kasatkina (20%)
September	Ashleigh Barty (87%)	Australia	(Greece) Maria Sakkari (13%)
October	Julia Görges (46%)	Germany	(Belarus) Aryna Sabalenka (41%) (Germany) Carina Witthöft (7%) (Russia) Natalia Vikhlyantseva (6%)

=== Shot of the month ===
Month	Player	Nationality	Other candidates
January	Agnieszka Radwańska (76%)	Poland	(Germany) Julia Görges (11%) (Kazakhstan) Yulia Putintseva (7%) (Czech Republic) Karolína Plíšková (4%) (France) Alizé Cornet (2%)
February	Angelique Kerber (41%)	Germany	(France) Kristina Mladenovic (22%) (Denmark) Caroline Wozniacki (20%) (Russia) Daria Kasatkina (11%) (Czech Republic) Karolína Plíšková (6%)
March	Caroline Wozniacki (36%)	Denmark	(Belgium) Kirsten Flipkens (24%) (United States) Venus Williams (22%) (United States) Bethanie Mattek-Sands (10%) (Russia) Elena Vesnina (8%)
April	Kristina Mladenovic (34%)	France	(Italy) Francesca Schiavone (32%) (Russia) Daria Kasatkina (15%) (Germany) Angelique Kerber (12%) (Russia) Anastasia Pavlyuchenkova (7%)
May	Venus Williams (35%)	United States	(Canada) Eugenie Bouchard (33%) (Czech Republic) Barbora Strýcová (17%) (Italy) Francesca Schiavone (10%) (Australia) Daria Gavrilova (5%)
June	Lucie Šafářová (70%)	Czech Republic	(Denmark) Caroline Wozniacki (11%) (Romania) Simona Halep (10%) (Czech Republic) Petra Krejsová (5%) (Czech Republic) Petra Kvitová (4%)
July	Petra Kvitová (60%)	Czech Republic	(Romania) Irina-Camelia Begu (24%) (Czech Republic) Kristýna Plíšková (8%) (Colombia) Mariana Duque Mariño (5%) (United States) Catherine Bellis (3%)
August	Daria Kasatkina (55%)	Russia	(Romania) Simona Halep (25%) (Poland) Agnieszka Radwańska (10%) (Czech Republic) Lucie Šafářová (6%) (United States) Madison Keys (4%)
September	Agnieszka Radwańska (78%)	Poland	(Thailand) Luksika Kumkhum (7%) (Germany) Angelique Kerber (6%) (Greece) Maria Sakkari (5%) (Slovakia) Dominika Cibulková (4%)
October	Magdaléna Rybáriková (31%)	Slovakia	(Germany) Angelique Kerber (23%) (Denmark) Caroline Wozniacki (19%) (Denmark) Caroline Wozniacki (15%) (Czech Republic) Petra Kvitová (12%)

== Retirements ==
Following is a list of notable players (winners of a main tour title, and/or part of the WTA rankings top 100 (singles) or (doubles) for at least one week) who announced their retirement from professional tennis, became inactive (after not playing for more than 52 weeks), or were permanently banned from playing, during the 2017 season:

- (Italy) Alberta Brianti – The former world number 55 announced her retirement in 2017.
- (Russia) Ekaterina Bychkova – The former world number 66 announced her retirement in 2017.
- Kimiko Date – The former world number 4 announced she will retire for a second time after the 2017 Japan Open.
- (Serbia) Vesna Dolonc – The former world number 84 announced her retirement from professional tennis in February 2017.
- (Russia) Vera Dushevina – The former singles world number 34 and doubles world number 27 announced her retirement from professional tennis on 15 August 2017.
- (Slovakia) Daniela Hantuchová – The former world number 5 and four-time mixed doubles grand slam champion announced her retirement from professional tennis in July 2017.
- (Switzerland) Martina Hingis – The former world number 1 in both singles and doubles, having turned professional in 1994. First retired in 2002 due to injuries, she had a comeback in 2006 after three years of inactivity and retired for the second time in 2008 after being banned for drug usage. She then announced a comeback in 2013, before retiring for a third and final time after the 2017 WTA Finals.
- (United States) Liezel Huber – The former doubles world number 1 and seven-time doubles grand slam champion announced her retirement from professional tennis in April 2017.
- (United States) Melanie Oudin – The former world number 31 and US Open mixed champion announced her retirement from professional tennis in August 2017.
- (Israel) Shahar Pe'er – The former world number 11 announced her retirement from professional tennis in February 2017.
- (Russia) Nadia Petrova – The former world number 3 announced her retirement from professional tennis in January 2017.
- (United Kingdom) Jocelyn Rae – The former doubles world number 67 announced her retirement from professional tennis in December 2017.
- (Australia) Jarmila Wolfe – The former world number 25 and Australian Open mixed champion announced her retirement from professional tennis in January 2017.

== Comebacks ==
- (Russia) Vera Zvonareva

== See also ==
- 2017 ATP World Tour
- 2017 WTA 125K series
- 2017 ITF Women's Circuit
- Women's Tennis Association
- International Tennis Federation
