= 2017 Internationaux de Strasbourg =

- Date: 22 – 27 May
- Edition: 31st
- Category: WTA International tournaments
- Draw: 32S / 16D
- Prize money: $250,000
- Surface: Clay
- Location: Strasbourg, France
- Venue: Tennis Club de Strasbourg

Champions

Singles
- (Australia) Samantha Stosur

Doubles
- (Australia) Ashleigh Barty / (Australia) Casey Dellacqua
← 2016 ·	Internationaux de Strasbourg	· 2018 →

The 2017 Internationaux de Strasbourg was a professional tennis tournament played on clay courts. It was the 31st edition of the tournament and part of the International-level tournament category of the 2017 WTA Tour. It took place at the Tennis Club de Strasbourg in Strasbourg, France, on 22-27 May 2017.

== Points and prize money ==
=== Point distribution ===
Event	W	F	SF	QF	Round of 16	Round of 32	Q	Q2	Q1
Women's singles	280	180	110	60	30	1	18	12	1
Women's doubles	280	180	110	60	1	—	—	—	—

=== Prize money ===
Event	W	F	SF	QF	Round of 16	Round of 32	Q2	Q1
Women's singles	€34,677	€17,258	€9,274	€4,980	€2,742	€1,694	€823	€484
Women's doubles	€9,919	€5,161	€2,770	€1,468	€774	—	—	—

== Singles main draw entrants ==
=== Seeds ===
Country	Player	Rank^{1}	Seed
DEN	Caroline Wozniacki	10	1
RUS	Elena Vesnina	15	2
~~CRO~~	~~Mirjana Lučić-Baroni~~	~~22~~	~~3~~
ESP	Carla Suárez Navarro	23	4
FRA	Caroline Garcia	24	5
AUS	Samantha Stosur	25	6
AUS	Daria Gavrilova	33	7
CHN	Peng Shuai	39	8
PUR	Monica Puig	40	9

- ^{1} Rankings as of May 15, 2017.

=== Other entrants ===
The following players received wildcards into the singles main draw:

- (France) Alizé Cornet
- (France) Amandine Hesse
- (Australia) Samantha Stosur
- (Russia) Elena Vesnina

The following players received entry from the qualifying draw:

- (Australia) Ashleigh Barty
- (United States) Julia Boserup
- (United States) Madison Brengle
- (Italy) Camila Giorgi
- (Russia) Elizaveta Kulichkova
- (Belarus) Vera Lapko

The following player received entry as a lucky loser:

- (Turkey) Çağla Büyükakçay

=== Withdrawals ===
Before the tournament

- (Spain) Lara Arruabarrena → replaced by (Russia) Natalia Vikhlyantseva
- (United States) Catherine Bellis → replaced by (United States) Jennifer Brady
- (Croatia) Mirjana Lučić-Baroni → replaced by (Turkey) Çağla Büyükakçay
- (Latvia) Jeļena Ostapenko → replaced by (Japan) Risa Ozaki
- (Italy) Roberta Vinci → replaced by (Germany) Andrea Petkovic

=== Retirements ===
- (Denmark) Caroline Wozniacki

== Doubles main draw entrants ==
=== Seeds ===
Country	Player	Country	Player	Rank^{1}	Seed
TPE	Chan Hao-ching	TPE	Chan Yung-jan	26	1
CAN	Gabriela Dabrowski	CHN	Xu Yifan	42	2
CRO	Darija Jurak	AUS	Anastasia Rodionova	70	3
JPN	Shuko Aoyama	CHN	Yang Zhaoxuan	91	4

- ^{1} Rankings as of May 15, 2017.

== Champions ==
=== Singles ===
- (Australia) Samantha Stosur def. (Australia) Daria Gavrilova, 5–7, 6–4, 6–3

=== Doubles ===
- (Australia) Ashleigh Barty / (Australia) Casey Dellacqua def. (Chinese Taipei) Chan Hao-ching / (Chinese Taipei) Chan Yung-jan, 6–4, 6–2
