= 2017 Connecticut Open =

- Date: August 20–26
- Edition: 49th
- Category: WTA Premier
- Draw: 30S / 16D
- Prize money: $695,900
- Surface: Hard / outdoor
- Location: New Haven, United States
- Venue: Cullman-Heyman Tennis Center

Champions

Singles
- (Australia) Daria Gavrilova

Doubles
- (Canada) Gabriela Dabrowski / (China) Xu Yifan
← 2016 ·	Connecticut Open	· 2018 →

The 2017 Connecticut Open (also known as the 2017 Connecticut Open presented by United Technologies for sponsorship reasons) was a tennis tournament played on outdoor hard courts. It was the 49th edition of the Connecticut Open, and part of the Premier Series of the 2017 WTA Tour. It took place at the Cullman-Heyman Tennis Center in New Haven, Connecticut, United States, from August 20 through August 26. It was the last event of the 2017 US Open Series before the 2017 US Open.

== Points and prize money ==
=== Point distribution ===
Event	W	F	SF	QF	Round of 16	Round of 32	Q	Q3	Q2	Q1
Singles	470	305	185	100	55	1	25	18	13	1
Doubles	470	305	185	100	1	—	—	—	—	—

=== Prize money ===
Event	W	F	SF	QF	Round of 16	Round of 32	Q3	Q2	Q1
Singles	$130,300	$69,380	$37,020	$19,885	$10,665	$5,820	$3,045	$1,620	$895
Doubles	$40,650	$21,700	$11,865	$6,035	$3,270	—	—	—	—

== Singles main-draw entrants ==
=== Seeds ===
Country	Player	Rank*	Seed
POL	Agnieszka Radwańska	10	1
SVK	Dominika Cibulková	11	2
CZE	Petra Kvitová	13	3
FRA	Kristina Mladenovic	14	4
RUS	Elena Vesnina	18	5
RUS	Anastasia Pavlyuchenkova	20	6
CZE	Barbora Strýcová	23	7
CHN	Peng Shuai	25	8

- Rankings are as of 14 August 2017

=== Other entrants ===
The following players received wildcards into the singles main draw:

- (Canada) Eugenie Bouchard
- ~~(United States) Sloane Stephens~~ (wrist injury)

The following players received entry from the qualifying draw:

- (Romania) Ana Bogdan
- (Slovakia) Jana Čepelová
- (Belgium) Kirsten Flipkens
- (Poland) Magda Linette
- (Belgium) Elise Mertens
- (Czech Republic) Kristýna Plíšková

The following player received entry as a lucky loser:

- (United States) Christina McHale

=== Withdrawals ===
Before the tournament

- (Switzerland) Timea Bacsinszky →replaced by (France) Alizé Cornet
- (United States) Sloane Stephens →replaced by (United States) Christina McHale
- (Australia) Samantha Stosur →replaced by (Czech Republic) Kateřina Siniaková

During the tournament

- (China) Zhang Shuai

== Doubles main-draw entrants ==
=== Seeds ===
Country	Player	Country	Player	Rank*	Seed
IND	Sania Mirza	ROU	Monica Niculescu	26	1
AUS	Ashleigh Barty	AUS	Casey Dellacqua	30	2
GER	Anna-Lena Grönefeld	CZE	Květa Peschke	40	3
CAN	Gabriela Dabrowski	CHN	Xu Yifan	48	4

- Rankings are as of 14 August 2017

=== Other entrants ===
The following pair received a wildcard into the doubles main draw:

- (Canada) Eugenie Bouchard / (United States) Sloane Stephens

The following pair received entry as alternates:

- (United States) Nicole Melichar / (United Kingdom) Anna Smith

=== Withdrawals ===
Before the tournament

- (United States) Sloane Stephens

== Finals ==
=== Singles ===
- (Australia) Daria Gavrilova defeated (Slovakia) Dominika Cibulková, 4–6, 6–3, 6–4

=== Doubles ===
- (Canada) Gabriela Dabrowski / (China) Xu Yifan defeated (Australia) Ashleigh Barty / (Australia) Casey Dellacqua, 3–6, 6–3, [10–8]
