= 2016 Qatar Total Open – Doubles =

Doubles
- 2016 Qatar Total Open

Final
- Champions: (Chinese Taipei) Chan Hao-ching (Chinese Taipei) Chan Yung-jan
- Runners-up: (Italy) Sara Errani (Spain) Carla Suárez Navarro
- Score: 6–3, 6–3

Events
Singles	Doubles
← 2015 ·	Qatar Total Open	· 2017 →

Raquel Atawo and Abigail Spears were the defending champions, but lost in the second round to Gabriela Dabrowski and María José Martínez Sánchez.
Chan Hao-ching and Chan Yung-jan won the title, defeating Sara Errani and Carla Suárez Navarro in the final, 6–3, 6–3.

== Seeds ==
The top four seeds received a bye into the second round.

1. (Switzerland) Martina Hingis / (India) Sania Mirza (quarterfinals)
2. (United States) Bethanie Mattek-Sands / (Kazakhstan) Yaroslava Shvedova (quarterfinals)
3. (France) Caroline Garcia / (France) Kristina Mladenovic (second round)
4. (Chinese Taipei) Chan Hao-ching / (Chinese Taipei) Chan Yung-jan (champions)
5. (Czech Republic) Andrea Hlaváčková / (Czech Republic) Lucie Hradecká (first round)
6. (Hungary) Tímea Babos / (Germany) Julia Görges (quarterfinals)
7. (United States) Raquel Atawo / (United States) Abigail Spears (second round)
8. (Slovenia) Andreja Klepač / (Slovenia) Katarina Srebotnik (second round)

== Draw ==
=== Key ===
- Q = Qualifier
- WC = Wild card
- LL = Lucky loser
- Alt = Alternate
- SE = Special exempt
- PR = Protected ranking
- ITF = ITF entry
- JE = Junior exempt
- w/o = Walkover
- r = Retired
- d = Defaulted
- SR = Special ranking

=== Finals ===
Semifinals
(Russia) Daria Kasatkina (Russia) Elena Vesnina	6	6^{5}	[8]
4	(Chinese Taipei) Chan Hao-ching (Chinese Taipei) Chan Yung-jan	3	7^{7}	[10]
(Canada) Gabriela Dabrowski (Spain) María José Martínez Sánchez	1	4
(Italy) Sara Errani (Spain) Carla Suárez Navarro	6	6

Final
4	(Chinese Taipei) Chan Hao-ching (Chinese Taipei) Chan Yung-jan	6	6
(Italy) Sara Errani (Spain) Carla Suárez Navarro	3	3

=== Top half ===
First round
(Chinese Taipei) C-j Chuang (Georgia (country)) O Kalashnikova	4	2
(China) Y Xu (China) S Zheng	6	6
(Russia) D Kasatkina (Russia) E Vesnina	6	7
(Russia) V Dushevina (Czech Republic) K Siniaková	4	5
WC	(Romania) S Halep (Romania) R Olaru	5	4
8	(Slovenia) A Klepač (Slovenia) K Srebotnik	7	6
(Chinese Taipei) C-w Chan (Hungary) K Marosi	6	6
(Ukraine) L Kichenok (Ukraine) N Kichenok	2	4
WC	(Tunisia) O Jabeur (Qatar) O Mourad	0	1
WC	(Czech Republic) P Kvitová (Czech Republic) B Strýcová	6	6
(China) C Liang (China) Y Wang	3	4
6	(Hungary) T Babos (Germany) J Görges	6	6

Second round
1	(Switzerland) M Hingis (India) S Mirza	6	4	[10]
(China) Y Xu (China) S Zheng	4	6	[4]
(Russia) D Kasatkina (Russia) E Vesnina	6	6
8	(Slovenia) A Klepač (Slovenia) K Srebotnik	4	4
4	(Chinese Taipei) H-c Chan (Chinese Taipei) Y-j Chan	6	6
(Chinese Taipei) C-w Chan (Hungary) K Marosi	2	1
WC	(Czech Republic) P Kvitová (Czech Republic) B Strýcová
6	(Hungary) T Babos (Germany) J Görges	w/o

Quarterfinals
1	(Switzerland) M Hingis (India) S Mirza	6	4	[5]
(Russia) D Kasatkina (Russia) E Vesnina	2	6	[10]
4	(Chinese Taipei) H-c Chan (Chinese Taipei) Y-j Chan	6	7^{8}
6	(Hungary) T Babos (Germany) J Görges	1	6^{6}

Semifinals
(Russia) D Kasatkina (Russia) E Vesnina	6	6^{5}	[8]
4	(Chinese Taipei) H-c Chan (Chinese Taipei) Y-j Chan	3	7^{7}	[10]

=== Bottom half ===
First round
7	(United States) R Atawo (United States) A Spears	6	6
WC	(Oman) F Al-Nabhani (United States) V Lepchenko	1	4
(Croatia) D Jurak (United States) N Melichar	6	1	[3]
(Canada) G Dabrowski (Spain) MJ Martínez Sánchez	2	6	[10]
(Ukraine) K Bondarenko (Ukraine) O Savchuk	6	6
(United Kingdom) N Broady (Poland) A Rosolska	4	2
5	(Czech Republic) A Hlaváčková (Czech Republic) L Hradecká	6	4	[6]
(Italy) S Errani (Spain) C Suárez Navarro	3	6	[10]
(Slovakia) D Hantuchová (Russia) E Makarova	6	5	[3]
(Russia) M Gasparyan (Romania) M Niculescu	4	7	[10]
(Germany) A-L Grönefeld (United States) C Vandeweghe	4	4
(Poland) K Jans-Ignacik (Czech Republic) B Krejčíková	6	6

Second round
7	(United States) R Atawo (United States) A Spears	6^{4}	1
(Canada) G Dabrowski (Spain) MJ Martínez Sánchez	7^{7}	6
(Ukraine) K Bondarenko (Ukraine) O Savchuk	6	6
3	(France) C Garcia (France) K Mladenovic	4	4
(Italy) S Errani (Spain) C Suárez Navarro	3	6	[10]
(Russia) M Gasparyan (Romania) M Niculescu	6	2	[7]
(Poland) K Jans-Ignacik (Czech Republic) B Krejčíková	3	6^{4}
2	(United States) B Mattek-Sands (Kazakhstan) Y Shvedova	6	7^{7}

Quarterfinals
(Canada) G Dabrowski (Spain) MJ Martínez Sánchez	7^{7}	7
(Ukraine) K Bondarenko (Ukraine) O Savchuk	6^{4}	5
(Italy) S Errani (Spain) C Suárez Navarro	5	6	[10]
2	(United States) B Mattek-Sands (Kazakhstan) Y Shvedova	7	4	[5]

Semifinals
(Canada) G Dabrowski (Spain) MJ Martínez Sánchez	1	4
(Italy) S Errani (Spain) C Suárez Navarro	6	6
