= 2017 Qatar Total Open – Doubles =

Doubles
- 2017 Qatar Total Open

Final
- Champions: (United States) Abigail Spears (Slovenia) Katarina Srebotnik
- Runners-up: (Ukraine) Olga Savchuk (Kazakhstan) Yaroslava Shvedova
- Score: 6–3, 7–6^{(9–7)}

Events
Singles	Doubles
← 2016 ·	Qatar Total Open	· 2018 →

Chan Hao-ching and Chan Yung-jan were the defending champions, but chose not to compete together. Hao-ching played alongside Christina McHale, but lost in the first round to Andrea Hlaváčková and Peng Shuai. Yung-jan teamed up with Martina Hingis, but lost in the semifinals to Olga Savchuk and Yaroslava Shvedova.

Abigail Spears and Katarina Srebotnik won the title, defeating Savchuk and Shvedova in the final, 6–3, 7–6^{(9–7)}.

== Seeds ==
1. (Chinese Taipei) Chan Yung-jan / (Switzerland) Martina Hingis (semifinals)
2. (India) Sania Mirza / (Czech Republic) Barbora Strýcová (semifinals)
3. (Czech Republic) Andrea Hlaváčková / (China) Peng Shuai (quarterfinals)
4. (United States) Abigail Spears / (Slovenia) Katarina Srebotnik (champions)

== Draw ==
=== Key ===
- Q = Qualifier
- WC = Wild card
- LL = Lucky loser
- Alt = Alternate
- SE = Special exempt
- PR = Protected ranking
- ITF = ITF entry
- JE = Junior exempt
- w/o = Walkover
- r = Retired
- d = Defaulted
- SR = Special ranking

First round
1	(Chinese Taipei) Y-j Chan (Switzerland) M Hingis	6	6
(Netherlands) K Bertens (Sweden) J Larsson	1	4
(Slovenia) A Klepač (Spain) MJ Martínez Sánchez	6	6
Alt	(United States) M Brengle (United Kingdom) N Broady	1	2
3	(Czech Republic) A Hlaváčková (China) S Peng	6	6
(Chinese Taipei) H-c Chan (United States) C McHale	3	2
(Hungary) T Babos (Russia) D Kasatkina
(Ukraine) O Savchuk (Kazakhstan) Y Shvedova	w/o
(Germany) A-L Grönefeld (Czech Republic) K Peschke	6	6
WC	(Oman) F Al-Nabhani (Qatar) M Al-Naimi	2	2
WC	(Chinese Taipei) C-j Chuang (Serbia) J Janković	0	7^{7}	[6]
4	(United States) A Spears (Slovenia) K Srebotnik	6	6^{2}	[10]
(Ukraine) K Bondarenko (Russia) E Vesnina	1	6	[10]
(Canada) G Dabrowski (Croatia) D Jurak	6	3	[12]
(United States) R Atawo (China) Y Xu	2	4
2	(India) S Mirza (Czech Republic) B Strýcová	6	6

Quarterfinals
1	(Chinese Taipei) Y-j Chan (Switzerland) M Hingis	6	6
(Slovenia) A Klepač (Spain) MJ Martínez Sánchez	3	3
3	(Czech Republic) A Hlaváčková (China) S Peng	3	6	[7]
(Ukraine) O Savchuk (Kazakhstan) Y Shvedova	6	1	[10]
(Germany) A-L Grönefeld (Czech Republic) K Peschke	1	5
4	(United States) A Spears (Slovenia) K Srebotnik	6	7
(Canada) G Dabrowski (Croatia) D Jurak	4	3
2	(India) S Mirza (Czech Republic) B Strýcová	6	6

Semifinals
1	(Chinese Taipei) Y-j Chan (Switzerland) M Hingis	6	2	[6]
(Ukraine) O Savchuk (Kazakhstan) Y Shvedova	3	6	[10]
4	(United States) A Spears (Slovenia) K Srebotnik	6	1	[10]
2	(India) S Mirza (Czech Republic) B Strýcová	3	6	[8]

Final
(Ukraine) O Savchuk (Kazakhstan) Y Shvedova	3	6^{7}
4	(United States) A Spears (Slovenia) K Srebotnik	6	7^{9}
