= 2017 Aegon Classic Birmingham – Doubles =

Doubles
- 2017 Aegon Classic Birmingham

Final
- Champions: (Australia) Ashleigh Barty (Australia) Casey Dellacqua
- Runners-up: (Chinese Taipei) Chan Hao-ching (China) Zhang Shuai
- Score: 6–1, 2–6, [10–8]

Details
- Draw: 16 (1WC)
- Seeds: 4

Events
Singles	Doubles
- Birmingham Classic

Karolína Plíšková and Barbora Strýcová were the defending champions, but Plíšková chose not to participate this year. Strýcová played alongside Lucie Šafářová, but the team withdrew before their quarterfinal match.

Ashleigh Barty and Casey Dellacqua won the title, defeating Chan Hao-ching and Zhang Shuai in the final, 6–1, 2–6, [10–8].

== Seeds ==
1. (Czech Republic) Lucie Šafářová / (Czech Republic) Barbora Strýcová (quarterfinals, withdrew)
2. (United States) Abigail Spears / (Slovenia) Katarina Srebotnik (quarterfinals, withdrew)
3. (Canada) Gabriela Dabrowski / (China) Xu Yifan (first round)
4. (Australia) Ashleigh Barty / (Australia) Casey Dellacqua (champions)

== Draw ==
Key

- Q = Qualifier
- WC = Wild card
- LL = Lucky loser
- Alt = Alternate
- ITF = ITF entry
- PR = Protected ranking
- SR = Special ranking
- SE = Special exempt
- JE = Junior exempt
- JR = Junior Accelerator Programme entrant
- CO = College Accelerator Programme entrant
- NG = Next Gen Accelerator Program entrant
- w/o = Walkover
- r = Retired
- d = Defaulted

=== Draw ===
First round
1	(Czech Republic) L Šafářová (Czech Republic) B Strýcová	6	6
(United States) J Cako (Bulgaria) A Naydenova	2	4
(India) S Mirza (United States) C Vandeweghe	6	6
(Croatia) D Jurak (Australia) An Rodionova	2	4
4	(Australia) A Barty (Australia) C Dellacqua	7	6
(Australia) D Gavrilova (Czech Republic) K Siniaková	5	1
(Slovakia) D Cibulková (Spain) G Muguruza	6	6
(Japan) N Hibino (Poland) A Rosolska	2	4
(Chinese Taipei) H-c Chan (China) S Zhang	5	6	[10]
(France) A Cornet (Kazakhstan) Y Putintseva	7	3	[3]
(Japan) S Aoyama (China) Z Yang	6	6
3	(Canada) G Dabrowski (China) Y Xu	3	0
(United States) R Atawo (United States) C McHale	6	2	[10]
WC	(United Kingdom) N Broady (United Kingdom) H Watson	2	6	[7]
(Ukraine) N Kichenok (Ukraine) O Savchuk	3	1
2	(United States) A Spears (Slovenia) K Srebotnik	6	6

Quarterfinals
1	(Czech Republic) L Šafářová (Czech Republic) B Strýcová
(India) S Mirza (United States) C Vandeweghe	w/o
4	(Australia) A Barty (Australia) C Dellacqua	6	6
(Slovakia) D Cibulková (Spain) G Muguruza	3	1
(Chinese Taipei) H-c Chan (China) S Zhang	2	6	[10]
(Japan) S Aoyama (China) Z Yang	6	2	[6]
(United States) R Atawo (United States) C McHale	w/o
2	(United States) A Spears (Slovenia) K Srebotnik

Semifinals
(India) S Mirza (United States) C Vandeweghe
4	(Australia) A Barty (Australia) C Dellacqua	w/o
(Chinese Taipei) H-c Chan (China) S Zhang	6	6
(United States) R Atawo (United States) C McHale	2	3

Final
4	(Australia) A Barty (Australia) C Dellacqua	6	2	[10]
(Chinese Taipei) H-c Chan (China) S Zhang	1	6	[8]
