= 2017 Internationaux de Strasbourg – Doubles =

Doubles
- 2017 Internationaux de Strasbourg

Final
- Champions: (Australia) Ashleigh Barty (Australia) Casey Dellacqua
- Runners-up: (Chinese Taipei) Chan Hao-ching (Chinese Taipei) Chan Yung-jan
- Score: 6–4, 6–2

Events
Singles	Doubles
← 2016 ·	Internationaux de Strasbourg	· 2018 →

Anabel Medina Garrigues and Arantxa Parra Santonja were the defending champions, but chose not to participate this year.

Ashleigh Barty and Casey Dellacqua won the title, defeating Chan Hao-ching and Chan Yung-jan in the final, 6–4, 6–2.

== Seeds ==
1. (Chinese Taipei) Chan Hao-ching / (Chinese Taipei) Chan Yung-jan (final)
2. (Canada) Gabriela Dabrowski / (China) Xu Yifan (quarterfinals)
3. (Croatia) Darija Jurak / (Australia) Anastasia Rodionova (first round)
4. (Japan) Shuko Aoyama / (China) Yang Zhaoxuan (semifinals)

== Draw ==
=== Key ===
- Q = Qualifier
- WC = Wild card
- LL = Lucky loser
- Alt = Alternate
- SE = Special exempt
- PR = Protected ranking
- ITF = ITF entry
- JE = Junior exempt
- w/o = Walkover
- r = Retired
- d = Defaulted
- SR = Special ranking

=== Draw ===
First round
1	(Chinese Taipei) H-c Chan (Chinese Taipei) Y-j Chan	6	6
(United States) M Brengle (United States) C McHale	2	1
(Brazil) L Pigossi (Chile) D Seguel	3	6	[4]
(Romania) R Olaru (Ukraine) O Savchuk	6	4	[10]
3	(Croatia) D Jurak (Australia) An Rodionova	6^{5}	6^{5}
(Slovakia) C Škamlová (Netherlands) E Wacanno	7^{7}	7^{7}
(Belarus) V Lapko (India) P Thombare	6	6
(China) C Liang (Poland) K Piter	3	4
(Australia) M Adamczak (Australia) S Sanders	6	3	[7]
(Switzerland) V Golubic (Czech Republic) Kr Plíšková	4	6	[10]
(United States) J Brady (United States) S Rogers	1	3
4	(Japan) S Aoyama (China) Z Yang	6	6
(Russia) N Dzalamidze (Belarus) L Marozava	0	2
(Australia) A Barty (Australia) C Dellacqua	6	6
(Australia) J Moore (Thailand) V Wongteanchai	1	4
2	(Canada) G Dabrowski (China) Y Xu	6	6

Quarterfinals
1	(Chinese Taipei) H-c Chan (Chinese Taipei) Y-j Chan	6	6
(Romania) R Olaru (Ukraine) O Savchuk	1	4
(Slovakia) C Škamlová (Netherlands) E Wacanno	6	7
(Belarus) V Lapko (India) P Thombare	3	5
(Switzerland) V Golubic (Czech Republic) Kr Plíšková	6	4	[4]
4	(Japan) S Aoyama (China) Z Yang	2	6	[10]
(Australia) A Barty (Australia) C Dellacqua	3	6	[10]
2	(Canada) G Dabrowski (China) Y Xu	6	4	[6]

Semifinals
1	(Chinese Taipei) H-c Chan (Chinese Taipei) Y-j Chan	6	6
(Slovakia) C Škamlová (Netherlands) E Wacanno	0	1
4	(Japan) S Aoyama (China) Z Yang	6^{2}	1
(Australia) A Barty (Australia) C Dellacqua	7^{7}	6

Final
1	(Chinese Taipei) H-c Chan (Chinese Taipei) Y-j Chan	4	2
(Australia) A Barty (Australia) C Dellacqua	6	6
