= 2017 Connecticut Open – Doubles =

Doubles
- 2017 Connecticut Open

Final
- Champions: (Canada) Gabriela Dabrowski (China) Xu Yifan
- Runners-up: (Australia) Ashleigh Barty (Australia) Casey Dellacqua
- Score: 3–6, 6–3, [10–8]

Details
- Draw: 16
- Seeds: 4

Events
Singles	Doubles
← 2016 ·	Connecticut Open	· 2018 →

Sania Mirza and Monica Niculescu were the defending champions, but lost in the first round to Nicole Melichar and Anna Smith.

Gabriela Dabrowski and Xu Yifan won the title, defeating Ashleigh Barty and Casey Dellacqua in the final, 3–6, 6–3, [10–8].

== Seeds ==
1. (India) Sania Mirza / (Romania) Monica Niculescu (first round)
2. (Australia) Ashleigh Barty / (Australia) Casey Dellacqua (final)
3. (Germany) Anna-Lena Grönefeld / (Czech Republic) Květa Peschke (first round, retired)
4. (Canada) Gabriela Dabrowski / (China) Xu Yifan (champions)

== Draw ==
=== Key ===
- Q = Qualifier
- WC = Wild card
- LL = Lucky loser
- Alt = Alternate
- SE = Special exempt
- PR = Protected ranking
- ITF = ITF entry
- JE = Junior exempt
- w/o = Walkover
- r = Retired
- d = Defaulted
- SR = Special ranking

=== Draw ===
First round
1	(India) S Mirza (Romania) M Niculescu	5	6^{4}
Alt	(United States) N Melichar (United Kingdom) A Smith	7	7^{7}
(Japan) S Aoyama (Croatia) D Jurak	6	7^{8}
(Japan) N Hibino (Poland) A Rosolska	3	6^{6}
4	(Canada) G Dabrowski (China) Y Xu	6	6^{14}	[10]
(Slovenia) A Klepač (Spain) MJ Martínez Sánchez	3	7^{16}	[3]
(Spain) L Arruabarrena (Spain) A Parra Santonja	1	4
(Romania) R Olaru (Ukraine) O Savchuk	6	6
(Belgium) E Mertens (Czech Republic) Kr Plíšková	6	6
(Ukraine) N Kichenok (Australia) An Rodionova	1	2
(Netherlands) K Bertens (Sweden) J Larsson	3
3	(Germany) A-L Grönefeld (Czech Republic) K Peschke	3^{r}
(Belgium) K Flipkens (Netherlands) D Schuurs	6	6
(Japan) M Ninomiya (Czech Republic) R Voráčová	4	2
(United States) A Spears (Slovenia) K Srebotnik	6^{4}	2
2	(Australia) A Barty (Australia) C Dellacqua	7^{7}	6

Quarterfinals
Alt	(United States) N Melichar (United Kingdom) A Smith	6	2	[10]
(Japan) S Aoyama (Croatia) D Jurak	4	6	[2]
4	(Canada) G Dabrowski (China) Y Xu	7^{7}	6
(Romania) R Olaru (Ukraine) O Savchuk	6^{3}	3
(Belgium) E Mertens (Czech Republic) Kr Plíšková	7	7
(Netherlands) K Bertens (Sweden) J Larsson	5	5
(Belgium) K Flipkens (Netherlands) D Schuurs	3	3
2	(Australia) A Barty (Australia) C Dellacqua	6	6

Semifinals
Alt	(United States) N Melichar (United Kingdom) A Smith	5	3
4	(Canada) G Dabrowski (China) Y Xu	7	6
(Belgium) E Mertens (Czech Republic) Kr Plíšková	2	1
2	(Australia) A Barty (Australia) C Dellacqua	6	6

Final
4	(Canada) G Dabrowski (China) Y Xu	3	6	[10]
2	(Australia) A Barty (Australia) C Dellacqua	6	3	[8]
