= 2017 Garbiñe Muguruza tennis season =

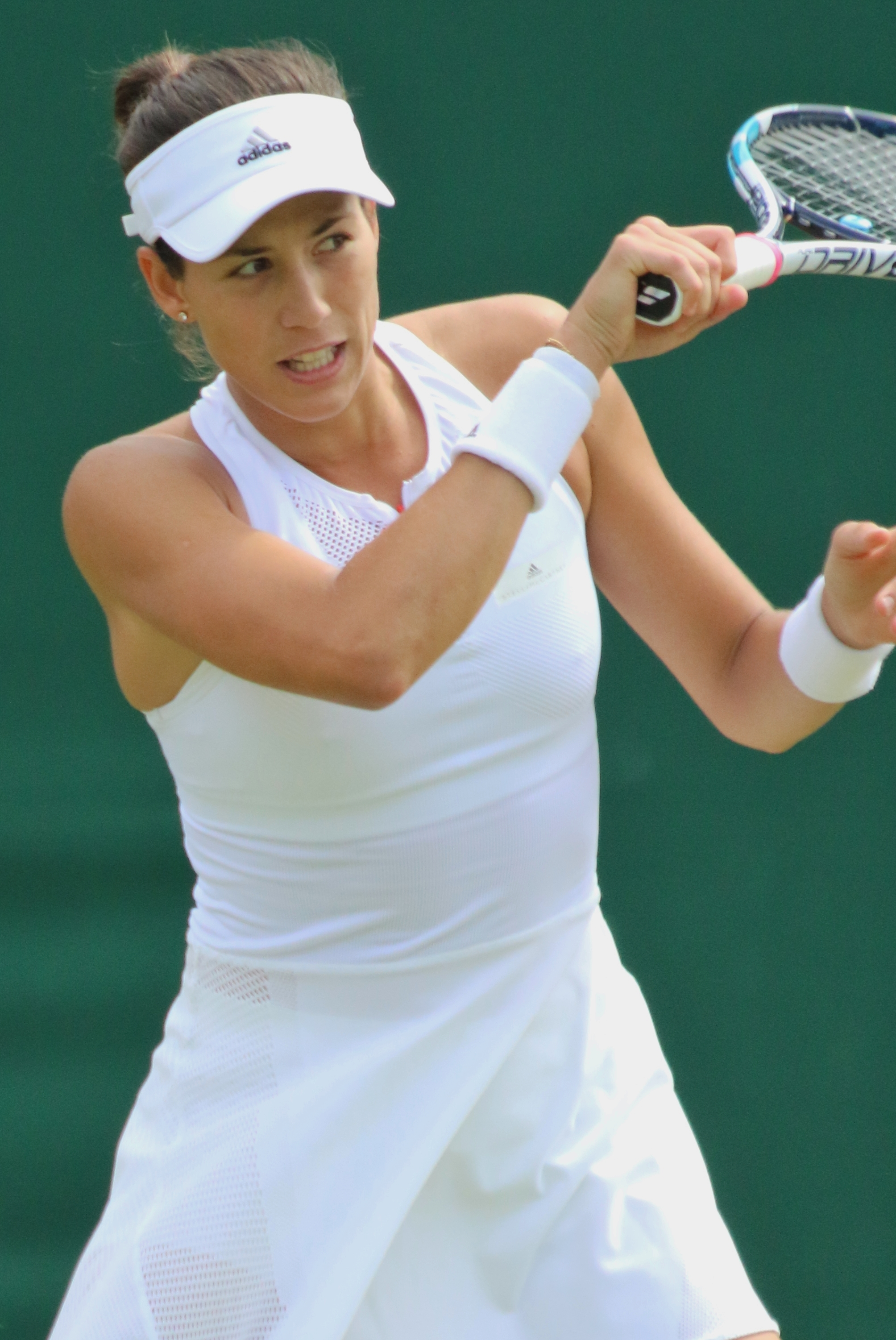
- Muguruza at the 2017 Wimbledon Championships.
- Full name: Garbiñe Muguruza
- Country: Spain
- Calendar prize money: $4,647,807 (singles & doubles)

Singles
- Season record: 42–16
- Calendar titles: 2
- Current ranking: No. 1
- Ranking change from previous year: ▲6

Grand Slam & significant results
- Australian Open: QF
- French Open: 4R
- Wimbledon: W
- US Open: 4R
- Other tournaments

Doubles
- Season record: 1–1
- Calendar titles: 0
- Current ranking: No. 465
- Ranking change from previous year: ▼78

Fed Cup
- Fed Cup: 1R (relegated to World Group II)
- Last updated on: 18 September 2017.

The 2017 Garbiñe Muguruza tennis season officially began on 2 January with the start of the 2017 Brisbane International, and ended on 26 October in Singapore. Muguruza entered the season as the number 7 ranked player and as the French Open defending champion.

== Year in detail ==
=== Grass Court Series ===
==== Birmingham Classic ====
Despite falling out of top 10 following French Open, Muguruza started strong grass court campaign with semifinal showing at Birmingham Classic. She beat Elizaveta Kulichkova and Alison Riske before winning against CoCo Vandeweghe, the same player she lost convincingly at Australian Open, with Vandeweghe retiring after losing second set. In the semifinal she lost to Ashleigh Barty in three sets.

==== Aegon International ====
In Eastbourne Muguruza lost in shocking way to Barbora Strýcová with winning only one game and being broken six times. Match lasted only one hour.

==== Wimbledon Championships ====
At Wimbledon Muguruza was non-top 10 seed for the first time at Major since 2015 Wimbledon, at fourteen. But being now underdog again, Muguruza showed once again quality tennis worth of a Grand Slam title, and she captured her first Wimbledon title beating Ekaterina Alexandrova, Yanina Wickmayer, Sorana Cîrstea, world No. 1 Angelique Kerber, No. 8 Svetlana Kuznetsova, Magdaléna Rybáriková and five-time champion Venus Williams, respectively. The only set she dropped was first set in match against Kerber. Muguruza's second Grand Slam titled propelled her again into top 10 at No. 7.

== All matches ==
Key
W	F	SF	QF	#R	RR	Q#	P#	DNQ	A	Z#	PO	G	S	B	NMS	NTI	P	NH

(W) winner; (F) finalist; (SF) semifinalist; (QF) quarterfinalist; (#R) rounds 4, 3, 2, 1; (RR) round-robin stage; (Q#) qualification round; (P#) preliminary round; (DNQ) did not qualify; (A) absent; (Z#) Davis/Fed Cup Zonal Group (with number indication) or (PO) play-off; (G) gold, (S) silver or (B) bronze Olympic/Paralympic medal; (NMS) not a Masters tournament; (NTI) not a Tier I tournament; (P) postponed; (NH) not held; (SR) strike rate (events won / competed); (W–L) win–loss record.
To avoid confusion and double counting, these charts are updated at the conclusion of a tournament or when the player's participation has ended.

=== Singles matches ===
Tournament	Match	Round	Opponent (Seed or Key)	Rank	Result	Score
Brisbane International; Brisbane, Australia; Premier; Hard, outdoor 2–7 January 2017
Brisbane International; Brisbane, Australia; Premier; Hard, outdoor 2–7 January 2017	1	1R	(Australia) Samantha Stosur	21	Win	7–5, 6–7^{(2–7)}, 7–5
Brisbane International; Brisbane, Australia; Premier; Hard, outdoor 2–7 January 2017	2	2R	(Russia) Daria Kasatkina	26	Win	7–5, 3–6, 7–6^{(9–7)}
Brisbane International; Brisbane, Australia; Premier; Hard, outdoor 2–7 January 2017	3	QF	(Russia) Svetlana Kuznetsova (5)	9	Win	7–5, 6–4
Brisbane International; Brisbane, Australia; Premier; Hard, outdoor 2–7 January 2017	4	SF	(France) Alizé Cornet	41	Loss	1–4 ret.
Australian Open; Melbourne, Australia; Grand Slam; Hard, outdoor 16–29 January 2017
Australian Open; Melbourne, Australia; Grand Slam; Hard, outdoor 16–29 January 2017	5	1R	(New Zealand) Marina Erakovic	110	Win	7–5, 6–4
Australian Open; Melbourne, Australia; Grand Slam; Hard, outdoor 16–29 January 2017	6	2R	(United States) Samantha Crawford	162	Win	7–5, 6–4
Australian Open; Melbourne, Australia; Grand Slam; Hard, outdoor 16–29 January 2017	7	3R	(Latvia) Anastasija Sevastova (32)	33	Win	6–4, 6–2
Australian Open; Melbourne, Australia; Grand Slam; Hard, outdoor 16–29 January 2017	8	4R	(Romania) Sorana Cîrstea	78	Win	6–2, 6–3
Australian Open; Melbourne, Australia; Grand Slam; Hard, outdoor 16–29 January 2017	9	QF	(United States) CoCo Vandeweghe	35	Loss	4–6, 0–6
Fed Cup World Group First Round; Ostrava, Czech Republic; Fed Cup; Hard, indoor 11–12 February 2017
Fed Cup World Group First Round; Ostrava, Czech Republic; Fed Cup; Hard, indoor 11–12 February 2017	10	RR	(Czech Republic) Barbora Strýcová	17	Win	6–0, 3–6, 6–1
Fed Cup World Group First Round; Ostrava, Czech Republic; Fed Cup; Hard, indoor 11–12 February 2017	11	RR	(Czech Republic) Karolína Plíšková	3	Loss	2–6, 2–6
Qatar Open; Doha, Qatar; Premier; Hard, outdoor 13–19 February 2017
Qatar Open; Doha, Qatar; Premier; Hard, outdoor 13–19 February 2017	12	1R	(Turkey) Çağla Büyükakçay (WC)	82	Win	6–3, 6–2
Qatar Open; Doha, Qatar; Premier; Hard, outdoor 13–19 February 2017	13	2R	(China) Zhang Shuai	31	Loss	6–7^{(3–7)}, 6–3, 5–7
Dubai Tennis Championships; Dubai, UAE; Premier 5 Hard, outdoor 20–26 February 2017
Dubai Tennis Championships; Dubai, UAE; Premier 5 Hard, outdoor 20–26 February 2017	–	1R	Bye			
Dubai Tennis Championships; Dubai, UAE; Premier 5 Hard, outdoor 20–26 February 2017	14	2R	(Ukraine) Kateryna Bondarenko	79	Loss	1–4 ret.
Indian Wells Open; Indian Wells, United States; Premier Mandatory; Hard, outdoor 6–19 March 2017
Indian Wells Open; Indian Wells, United States; Premier Mandatory; Hard, outdoor 6–19 March 2017	–	1R	Bye			
Indian Wells Open; Indian Wells, United States; Premier Mandatory; Hard, outdoor 6–19 March 2017	15	2R	(Belgium) Kirsten Flipkens	87	Win	6–2, 6–3
Indian Wells Open; Indian Wells, United States; Premier Mandatory; Hard, outdoor 6–19 March 2017	16	3R	(United States) Kayla Day (WC)	175	Win	3–6, 7–5, 6–2
Indian Wells Open; Indian Wells, United States; Premier Mandatory; Hard, outdoor 6–19 March 2017	17	4R	(Ukraine) Elina Svitolina (10)	10	Win	7–6^{(7–5)}, 1–6, 6–0
Indian Wells Open; Indian Wells, United States; Premier Mandatory; Hard, outdoor 6–19 March 2017	18	QF	(Czech Republic) Karolína Plíšková (3)	3	Loss	6–7^{(2–7)}, 6–7^{(5–7)}
Miami Open; Miami, United States; Premier Mandatory; Hard, outdoor 20 March – 2 April 2017
Miami Open; Miami, United States; Premier Mandatory; Hard, outdoor 20 March – 2 April 2017	–	1R	Bye			
Miami Open; Miami, United States; Premier Mandatory; Hard, outdoor 20 March – 2 April 2017	19	2R	(United States) Christina Mchale	46	Win	0–6, 7–6^{(8–6)}, 6–4
Miami Open; Miami, United States; Premier Mandatory; Hard, outdoor 20 March – 2 April 2017	20	3R	(China) Zhang Shuai (30)	33	Win	4–6, 6–2, 6–2
Miami Open; Miami, United States; Premier Mandatory; Hard, outdoor 20 March – 2 April 2017	21	4R	(Denmark) Caroline Wozniacki (12)	14	Loss	6–7^{(1–7)} ret.
Stuttgart Open; Stuttgart, Germany; Premier; Clay, indoor 24–30 April 2017
Stuttgart Open; Stuttgart, Germany; Premier; Clay, indoor 24–30 April 2017	–	1R	Bye			
Stuttgart Open; Stuttgart, Germany; Premier; Clay, indoor 24–30 April 2017	22	2R	(Estonia) Anett Kontaveit (Q)	73	Loss	6–2, 6–7^{(1–7)}, 1–6
Madrid Open; Madrid, Spain; Premier Mandatory; Clay, outdoor 8–14 May 2017
Madrid Open; Madrid, Spain; Premier Mandatory; Clay, outdoor 8–14 May 2017	23	1R	(Switzerland) Timea Bacsinszky	28	Loss	1–6, 3–6
Italian Open; Rome, Italy; Premier 5 Clay, outdoor 15–21 May 2017
Italian Open; Rome, Italy; Premier 5 Clay, outdoor 15–21 May 2017	–	1R	Bye			
Italian Open; Rome, Italy; Premier 5 Clay, outdoor 15–21 May 2017	24	2R	(Latvia) Jeļena Ostapenko	50	Win	2–6, 6–2, 6–1
Italian Open; Rome, Italy; Premier 5 Clay, outdoor 15–21 May 2017	25	3R	(Germany) Julia Görges	45	Win	7–5, 6–4
Italian Open; Rome, Italy; Premier 5 Clay, outdoor 15–21 May 2017	26	QF	(United States) Venus Williams (9)	12	Win	6–2, 3–6, 6–2
Italian Open; Rome, Italy; Premier 5 Clay, outdoor 15–21 May 2017	27	SF	(Ukraine) Elina Svitolina (8)	11	Loss	1–4 ret.
French Open; Paris, France; Grand Slam; Clay, outdoor 28 May – 11 June 2017
French Open; Paris, France; Grand Slam; Clay, outdoor 28 May – 11 June 2017	28	1R	(Italy) Francesca Schiavone	78	Win	6–2, 6–4
French Open; Paris, France; Grand Slam; Clay, outdoor 28 May – 11 June 2017	29	2R	(Estonia) Anett Kontaveit	53	Win	6–7^{(4–7)}, 6–4, 6–2
French Open; Paris, France; Grand Slam; Clay, outdoor 28 May – 11 June 2017	30	3R	(Kazakhstan) Yulia Putintseva (27)	29	Win	7–5, 6–2
French Open; Paris, France; Grand Slam; Clay, outdoor 28 May – 11 June 2017	31	4R	(France) Kristina Mladenovic (13)	14	Loss	1–6, 6–3, 3–6
Birmingham Classic; Birmingham, United Kingdom; Premier; Grass, outdoor 19–25 June 2017
Birmingham Classic; Birmingham, United Kingdom; Premier; Grass, outdoor 19–25 June 2017	32	1R	(Russia) Elizaveta Kulichkova (Q)	154	Win	6–3, 3–6, 6–4
Birmingham Classic; Birmingham, United Kingdom; Premier; Grass, outdoor 19–25 June 2017	33	2R	(United States) Alison Riske	45	Win	6–1, 6–4
Birmingham Classic; Birmingham, United Kingdom; Premier; Grass, outdoor 19–25 June 2017	34	QF	(United States) CoCo Vandeweghe	30	Win	4–6, 6–4 ret.
Birmingham Classic; Birmingham, United Kingdom; Premier; Grass, outdoor 19–25 June 2017	35	SF	(Australia) Ashleigh Barty	77	Loss	6–3, 4–6, 3–6
Eastbourne International; Birmingham, United Kingdom; Premier; Grass, outdoor 26 June – 2 July 2017
Eastbourne International; Birmingham, United Kingdom; Premier; Grass, outdoor 26 June – 2 July 2017	–	1R	Bye			
Eastbourne International; Birmingham, United Kingdom; Premier; Grass, outdoor 26 June – 2 July 2017	36	2R	(Czech Republic) Barbora Strýcová	23	Loss	1–6, 0–6
Wimbledon Championships; London, United Kingdom; Grand Slam; Grass, outdoor 3–16 July 2017
Wimbledon Championships; London, United Kingdom; Grand Slam; Grass, outdoor 3–16 July 2017	37	1R	(Russia) Ekaterina Alexandrova	75	Win	6–2, 6–4
Wimbledon Championships; London, United Kingdom; Grand Slam; Grass, outdoor 3–16 July 2017	38	2R	(Belgium) Yanina Wickmayer	96	Win	6–2, 6–4
Wimbledon Championships; London, United Kingdom; Grand Slam; Grass, outdoor 3–16 July 2017	39	3R	(Romania) Sorana Cîrstea	63	Win	6–2, 6–2
Wimbledon Championships; London, United Kingdom; Grand Slam; Grass, outdoor 3–16 July 2017	40	4R	(Germany) Angelique Kerber (1)	1	Win	4–6, 6–4, 6–4
Wimbledon Championships; London, United Kingdom; Grand Slam; Grass, outdoor 3–16 July 2017	41	QF	(Russia) Svetlana Kuznetsova (7)	8	Win	6–3, 6–4
Wimbledon Championships; London, United Kingdom; Grand Slam; Grass, outdoor 3–16 July 2017	42	SF	(Slovakia) Magdaléna Rybáriková (PR)	87	Win	6–1, 6–1
Wimbledon Championships; London, United Kingdom; Grand Slam; Grass, outdoor 3–16 July 2017	43	W	(United States) Venus Williams (10)	11	Win (1)	7–5, 6–0
Stanford Classic; Stanford, United States; Premier; Hard, outdoor 31 July – 6 August 2017
Stanford Classic; Stanford, United States; Premier; Hard, outdoor 31 July – 6 August 2017	–	1R	Bye			
Stanford Classic; Stanford, United States; Premier; Hard, outdoor 31 July – 6 August 2017	44	2R	(United States) Kayla Day	129	Win	6–2, 6–0
Stanford Classic; Stanford, United States; Premier; Hard, outdoor 31 July – 6 August 2017	45	QF	(Croatia) Ana Konjuh (5)	20	Win	6–1, 6–3
Stanford Classic; Stanford, United States; Premier; Hard, outdoor 31 July – 6 August 2017	46	SF	(United States) Madison Keys (3)	21	Loss	3–6, 2–6
Canadian Open; Montreal, Canada; Premier 5 Hard, outdoor 7–13 August 2017
Canadian Open; Montreal, Canada; Premier 5 Hard, outdoor 7–13 August 2017	–	1R	Bye			
Canadian Open; Montreal, Canada; Premier 5 Hard, outdoor 7–13 August 2017	47	2R	(Belgium) Kirsten Flipkens (Q)	82	Win	7–5, 6–2
Canadian Open; Montreal, Canada; Premier 5 Hard, outdoor 7–13 August 2017	48	3R	(Australia) Ashleigh Barty (Q)	58	Win	6–0, 3–6, 6–2
Canadian Open; Montreal, Canada; Premier 5 Hard, outdoor 7–13 August 2017	49	QF	(Ukraine) Elina Svitolina	5	Loss	6–4, 4–6, 3–6
Cincinnati Open; Cincinnati, United States; Premier 5 Hard, outdoor 14–20 August 2017
Cincinnati Open; Cincinnati, United States; Premier 5 Hard, outdoor 14–20 August 2017	–	1R	Bye			
Cincinnati Open; Cincinnati, United States; Premier 5 Hard, outdoor 14–20 August 2017	50	2R	(Brazil) Beatriz Haddad Maia (Q)	80	Win	6–0, 7–5
Cincinnati Open; Cincinnati, United States; Premier 5 Hard, outdoor 14–20 August 2017	51	3R	(United States) Madison Keys (16)	17	Win	6–4, 3–6, 7–6^{(7–3)}
Cincinnati Open; Cincinnati, United States; Premier 5 Hard, outdoor 14–20 August 2017	52	QF	(Russia) Svetlana Kuznetsova (8)	8	Win	6–2, 5–7, 7–5
Cincinnati Open; Cincinnati, United States; Premier 5 Hard, outdoor 14–20 August 2017	53	SF	(Czech Republic) Karolína Plíšková (1)	1	Win	6–3, 6–2
Cincinnati Open; Cincinnati, United States; Premier 5 Hard, outdoor 14–20 August 2017	54	W	(Romania) Simona Halep (2)	2	Win (2)	6–1, 6–0
US Open; New York City, United States; Grand Slam; Hard, outdoor 28 August – 10 September 2017
US Open; New York City, United States; Grand Slam; Hard, outdoor 28 August – 10 September 2017	55	1R	(United States) Varvara Lepchenko	64	Win	6–0, 6–3
US Open; New York City, United States; Grand Slam; Hard, outdoor 28 August – 10 September 2017	56	2R	(China) Duan Yingying	92	Win	6–4, 6–0
US Open; New York City, United States; Grand Slam; Hard, outdoor 28 August – 10 September 2017	57	3R	(Slovakia) Magdaléna Rybáriková (31)	32	Win	6–1, 6–1
US Open; New York City, United States; Grand Slam; Hard, outdoor 28 August – 10 September 2017	58	4R	(Czech Republic) Petra Kvitová (13)	14	Loss	6–7^{(3–7)}, 3–6
Pan Pacific Open; Tokyo, Japan; Premier; Hard, outdoor 18–24 September 2017
Pan Pacific Open; Tokyo, Japan; Premier; Hard, outdoor 18–24 September 2017	–	1R	Bye			
Pan Pacific Open; Tokyo, Japan; Premier; Hard, outdoor 18–24 September 2017	59	2R	(Puerto Rico) Monica Puig	70	Win	6–4, 6–0
Pan Pacific Open; Tokyo, Japan; Premier; Hard, outdoor 18–24 September 2017	60	QF	(France) Caroline Garcia (9)	20	Win	6–2, 6–4
Pan Pacific Open; Tokyo, Japan; Premier; Hard, outdoor 18–24 September 2017	61	SF	(Denmark) Caroline Wozniacki (3)	6	Loss	2–6, 0–6
Wuhan Open; Wuhan, China; Premier 5 Hard, outdoor 25 September – 1 October 2017
Wuhan Open; Wuhan, China; Premier 5 Hard, outdoor 25 September – 1 October 2017	–	1R	Bye			
Wuhan Open; Wuhan, China; Premier 5 Hard, outdoor 25 September – 1 October 2017	62	2R	(Ukraine) Lesia Tsurenko	50	Win	6–4, 6–4
Wuhan Open; Wuhan, China; Premier 5 Hard, outdoor 25 September – 1 October 2017	63	3R	(Poland) Magda Linette (Q)	83	Win	6–2, 1–6, 6–4
Wuhan Open; Wuhan, China; Premier 5 Hard, outdoor 25 September – 1 October 2017	64	QF	(Latvia) Jeļena Ostapenko (8)	10	Loss	6–1, 3–6, 2–6
China Open; Beijing, China; Premier Mandatory; Hard, outdoor 2–8 October 2017
China Open; Beijing, China; Premier Mandatory; Hard, outdoor 2–8 October 2017	65	1R	(Czech Republic) Barbora Strýcová	29	Loss	1–6, 0–2 ret.
WTA Finals; Singapore; Year-End Championships; Hard, indoor 23–29 October 2017
WTA Finals; Singapore; Year-End Championships; Hard, indoor 23–29 October 2017	66	RR	(Latvia) Jeļena Ostapenko (7)	7	Win	6–3, 6–4
WTA Finals; Singapore; Year-End Championships; Hard, indoor 23–29 October 2017	67	RR	(Czech Republic) Karolína Plíšková (3)	3	Loss	2–6, 2–6
WTA Finals; Singapore; Year-End Championships; Hard, indoor 23–29 October 2017	68	RR	(United States) Venus Williams (5)	5	Loss	5–7, 4–6

=== Doubles matches ===
Tournament	Match	Round	Opponents (Seed or Key)	Rank	Result	Score
Birmingham Classic; Birmingham, United Kingdom; Premier; Grass, outdoor 19–25 June 2017; Partner: (Slovakia) Dominika Cibulková
Birmingham Classic; Birmingham, United Kingdom; Premier; Grass, outdoor 19–25 June 2017; Partner: (Slovakia) Dominika Cibulková	1	1R	(Japan) Nao Hibino / (Poland) Alicja Rosolska	47 / 32	Win	6–2, 6–4
Birmingham Classic; Birmingham, United Kingdom; Premier; Grass, outdoor 19–25 June 2017; Partner: (Slovakia) Dominika Cibulková	2	QF	(Australia) Ashleigh Barty / (Australia) Casey Dellacqua (4)	14 / 14	Loss	3–6, 1–6

=== Exhibition matches ===
Tournament	Match	Round	Opponent (Seed or Key)	Rank	Result	Score
Tie Break Tens; Madrid, Spain; Singles exhibition Clay, indoor 4 May 2017
Tie Break Tens; Madrid, Spain; Singles exhibition Clay, indoor 4 May 2017	1	QF	(Poland) Agnieszka Radwańska	8	Loss	[5–10]

== Tournament schedule ==
=== Singles schedule ===
Muguruza's 2017 singles tournament schedule is as follows:

Date	Tournament	City	Category	Surface	2016 result	2016 points	2017 points	Outcome
2 January 2017– 7 January 2017	Brisbane International	Brisbane	Premier	Hard	2R	1	185	Semifinals retired against (France) Alizé Cornet, 1–4
16 January 2017– 29 January 2017	Australian Open	Melbourne	Grand Slam	Hard	3R	130	430	Quarterfinals lost to (United States) CoCo Vandeweghe, 4–6, 0–6
11 February 2017– 12 February 2017	Fed Cup; World Group First Round	Ostrava	Fed Cup	Hard (i)	WGII	—	—	Czech Republic def. Spain, 3–2; Spain relegated to WG Play-offs
13 February 2017– 19 February 2017	Qatar Open	Doha	Premier	Hard	QF	190	55	Second Round lost to (China) Zhang Shuai, 6–7^{(3–7)}, 6–3, 5–7
20 February 2017– 26 February 2017	Dubai Championships	Dubai	Premier 5	Hard	2R	1	1	Second Round retired against (Ukraine) Kateryna Bondarenko, 1–4
6 March 2017– 19 March 2017	Indian Wells Masters	Indian Wells	Premier Mandatory	Hard	2R	10	215	Quarterfinals lost to (Czech Republic) Karolína Plíšková, 6–7^{(2–7)}, 6–7^{(5–7)}
20 March 2017– 2 April 2017	Miami Open	Miami	Premier Mandatory	Hard	4R	120	120	Fourth Round retired against (Denmark) Caroline Wozniacki, 6–7^{(1–7)}
24 April 2017– 30 April 2017	Stuttgart Open	Stuttgart	Premier	Clay (i)	QF	100	1	Second Round lost to (Estonia) Anett Kontaveit, 6–2, 6–7^{(1–7)}, 1–6
8 May 2017– 14 May 2017	Madrid Open	Madrid	Premier Mandatory	Clay	2R	65	10	First Round lost to (Switzerland) Timea Bacsinszky, 1–6, 3–6
15 May 2017– 21 May 2017	Italian Open	Rome	Premier 5	Clay	SF	350	350	Semifinals; Retired against (Ukraine) Elina Svitolina, 1–4
28 May 2017– 11 June 2017	French Open	Paris	Grand Slam	Clay	W	2,000	240	Fourth Round lost to (France) Kristina Mladenovic, 1–6, 6–3, 3–6
19 June 2017– 25 June 2017	Birmingham Classic	Birmingham	Premier	Grass	—	—	185	Semifinals lost to (Australia) Ashleigh Barty, 6–3, 4–6, 3–6
26 June 2017– 2 July 2017	Eastbourne International	Eastbourne	Premier	Grass	—	—	1	Second round lost to (Czech Republic) Barbora Strýcová, 1–6, 0–6
3 July 2017– 16 July 2017	Wimbledon	London	Grand Slam	Grass	2R	70	2,000	Winner defeated (United States) Venus Williams, 7–5, 6–0
31 July 2017– 6 August 2017	Stanford Classic	Stanford	Premier	Hard	—	—	185	Semifinals lost to (United States) Madison Keys, 3–6, 2–6
7 August 2017– 13 August 2017	Canadian Open	Toronto	Premier 5	Hard	—	—	190	Quarterfinals lost to (Ukraine) Elina Svitolina, 6–4, 4–6, 3–6
14 August 2017– 20 August 2017	Cincinnati Masters	Cincinnati	Premier 5	Hard	SF	350	900	Winner defeated (Romania) Simona Halep, 6–1, 6–0
28 August 2017– 10 September 2017	US Open	New York City	Grand Slam	Hard	2R	70	240	Fourth Round lost to (Czech Republic) Petra Kvitová, 6–7^{(3–7)}, 3–6
18 September 2017– 24 September 2017	Pan Pacific Open	Tokyo	Premier	Hard	QF	100	185	Semifinals lost to (Denmark) Caroline Wozniacki, 2–6, 0–6
24 September 2017– 30 September 2017	Wuhan Open	Wuhan	Premier 5	Hard	1R	1	190	Quarterfinals lost to (Latvia) Jeļena Ostapenko, 6–1, 3–6, 2–6
2 October 2017– 8 October 2017	China Open	Beijing	Premier Mandatory	Hard	3R	120	100	First round lost to (Czech Republic) Barbora Strýcová, 1–6, 0–2 ret.
22 October 2017– 29 October 2017	WTA Finals	Singapore	WTA Finals	Hard (i)	RR	500	500	Failed to advance into the semifinals 1 won & 2 losses
Total year-end points						4236	6135	▲1899 difference

== Yearly records ==
=== Head-to-head matchups ===
(Bold denotes a top 10 player at the time of the most recent match between the two players, Italic denotes top 50.)

- (Russia) **Svetlana Kuznetsova** 3–0
- (Romania) Sorana Cîrstea 2–0
- (United States) Kayla Day 2–0
- (Belgium) Kirsten Flipkens 2–0
- (Slovakia) Magdaléna Rybáriková 2–0
- (United States) Venus Williams 2–0
- (Russia) Ekaterina Alexandrova 1–0
- (Turkey) Çağla Büyükakçay 1–0
- (United States) Samantha Crawford 1–0
- (China) Duan Yingying 1–0
- (New Zealand) Marina Erakovic 1–0
- (Germany) Julia Görges 1–0
- (Brazil) Beatriz Haddad Maia 1–0
- (Romania) **Simona Halep** 1–0
- (Russia) Daria Kasatkina 1–0
- (Germany) **Angelique Kerber** 1–0
- (Croatia) Ana Konjuh 1–0
- (United States) Varvara Lepchenko 1–0
- (Russia) Elizaveta Kulichkova 1–0
- (United States) Christina Mchale 1–0
- (Latvia) Jeļena Ostapenko 1–0
- (Kazakhstan) Yulia Putintseva 1–0
- (United States) Alison Riske 1–0
- (Italy) Francesca Schiavone 1–0
- (Latvia) Anastasija Sevastova 1–0
- (Australia) Samantha Stosur 1–0
- (Belgium) Yanina Wickmayer 1–0
- (Australia) Ashleigh Barty 1–1
- (United States) Madison Keys 1–1
- (Estonia) Anett Kontaveit 1–1
- (Czech Republic) Barbora Strýcová 1–1
- (United States) CoCo Vandeweghe 1–1
- (China) Zhang Shuai 1–1
- (Czech Republic) **Karolína Plíšková** 1–2
- (Ukraine) **Elina Svitolina** 1–2
- (Switzerland) Timea Bacsinszky 0–1
- (Ukraine) Kateryna Bondarenko 0–1
- (France) Alizé Cornet 0–1
- (Czech Republic) Petra Kvitová 0–1
- (France) Kristina Mladenovic 0–1
- (Denmark) Caroline Wozniacki 0–1

=== Finals ===
==== Singles: 2 (2–0) ====
Legend Grand Slam tournaments (1–0) WTA Tour Championships (0–0) WTA Premier Mandatory (0–0) WTA Premier 5 (1–0) WTA Premier (0–0) WTA International (0–0)	Finals by surface Hard (1–0) Clay (0–0) Grass (1–0)	Finals by venue Outdoors (2–0) Indoors (0–0)

Result	W–L	Date	Tournament	Tier	Surface	Opponent	Score
Win	1–0	Jul 2017	Wimbledon, United Kingdom	Grand Slam	Grass	(United States) Venus Williams	7–5, 6–0
Win	2–0	Aug 2017	Cincinnati Open, United States	Premier 5	Hard	(Romania) Simona Halep	6–1, 6–0

== See also ==
- 2017 WTA Tour
- Garbiñe Muguruza career statistics
