= 2017 WTA Elite Trophy =

- Date: October 31 – November 5
- Edition: 3rd
- Draw: 12S/6D
- Surface: Hard / Outdoor / Covered Court
- Location: Zhuhai, China
- Venue: Hengqin Tennis Center, Zhuhai

Champions

Singles
- (Germany) Julia Görges

Doubles
- (China) Duan Yingying / (China) Han Xinyun
← 2016 ·	WTA Elite Trophy	· 2018 →

The 2017 WTA Elite Trophy was a women's tennis tournament played at the Hengqin International Tennis Center in Zhuhai, China. It was the 3rd edition of the singles event and doubles competition. The tournament was contested by twelve singles players and six doubles teams.

== Tournament ==
=== Qualifying ===
WTA Elite Trophy is an invitation-only event.

==== Singles qualifying ====
The field consists of the top eleven players not already qualified for the 2017 WTA Finals, plus either (a) the 12th-player not qualified for 2017 WTA Finals, or (b) a wild card. The final two alternates for the 2017 WTA Finals would have been eligible to play in WTA Elite Trophy even if they had participated in the WTA Finals. Point totals are calculated by combining points obtained from sixteen tournaments. Of these sixteen tournaments, a player's results from the four Grand Slam events, the four Premier Mandatory tournaments, and (for Top 20 players at the end of 2016) the best results from two Premier 5 tournaments must be included.

==== Doubles qualifying ====
Two teams composed of players that did not compete in the WTA Finals singles (except Finals Alternates) or doubles competitions, using the players’ combined doubles rankings as of the Monday after the final regular-season Tournament of the current Tour Year to determine the order of acceptance; and up to two teams composed of players that did not compete in the WTA Finals singles (except Finals Alternates) or doubles competitions and that include at least one Elite Trophy Singles Qualified Player or Elite Trophy Alternate, using the higher of the players’ combined singles or doubles rankings as of the Monday after the final regular-season Tournament of the current Tour Year to determine the order of acceptance. Plus two wild cards. For each wild card not given out, the next highest pair of players shall become a participant.

=== Format ===
The singles event features twelve players in a round robin event, split into four groups of three. Over the first four days of competition, each player meets the other two players in her group, with the winner in each group advancing to the semifinal. The winners of each semifinal meet in the championship match. The six doubles teams will be split into two round robin groups, with the winner of each advancing to the final.

==== Round robin tie-breaking methods ====
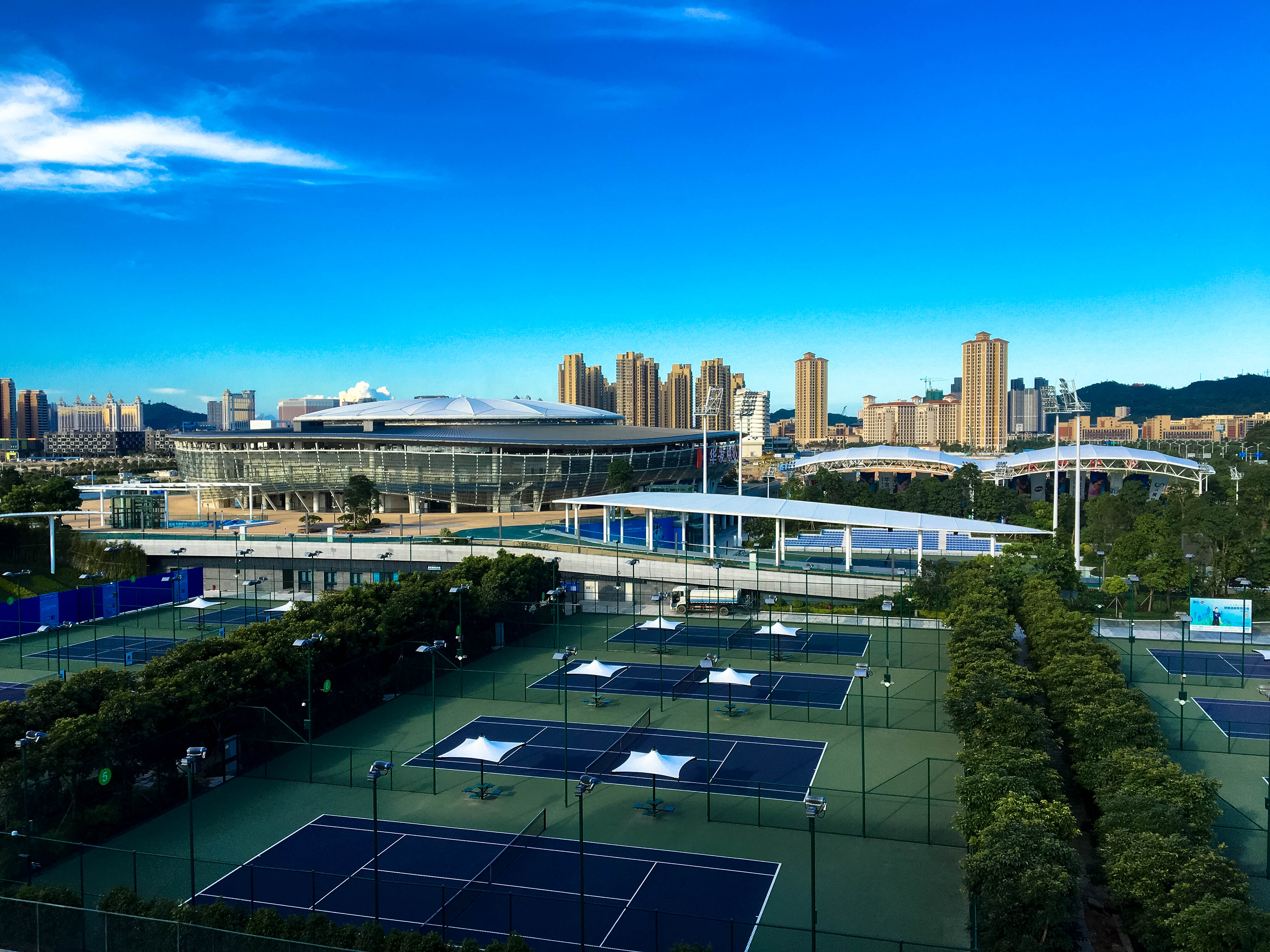
Hengqin Tennis Center Zhuhai

In 2017, the final standings of each group were determined by the first of the following methods that applied:

1. Greatest number of wins.
2. Greatest number of matches played.
3. In case of a 2-way tie:
  - Head-to-head results
4. In case of a 3-way tie:
  - Percentage of sets won
  - Percentage of games won

==== Ambassador of the Tournament ====
Stefanie Graf, former WTA World No.1 and 22-time Grand Slam champion, continued as Tournament Ambassador for the 2017 WTA Elite Trophy Zhuhai, helping promote the third edition of this elite year-end women’s tennis event.

== Prize money and points ==
The total prize money for the Hengqin Life 2017 WTA Elite Trophy Zhuhai was US $2,280,935.

Stage	Singles		Doubles	
Stage	Prize money	Points	Prize money	Points
Champion	RR^{1} + $478,200	RR + 460	RR^{1} + $20,000	—
Runner-up	RR + $160,000	RR + 200	RR^{1} + $10,000	—
Semifinalist loss	RR + $17,000	RR	—	—
Round Robin win per match	$76,300	120	$5,000	—
Round Robin loss per match	—	40	—	—
Participation fee	$42,500	—	15,000	—
Alternates	$10,000	—	—	—

Undefeated champion: $673,300 ($42,500 participation, $152,600 RR, $478,200 SF/F)

- ^{1} RR means prize money or points won in the round robin.

== Qualified players ==
=== Singles ===
- Players in gold qualified.
- The player in dark gold was awarded a wildcard.
- Players in brown withdrew from consideration from playing the tournament.

Rank	Athlete	Grand Slam tournament				Premier Mandatory				Best Premier 5		Best other						Total points	Tours	Titles
Rank	Athlete	AUS	FRA	WIM	USO	INW	MIA	MAD	BEI	1	2	1	2	3	4	5	6	Total points	Tours	Titles
9	(United Kingdom) Johanna Konta	QF; 430	R128; 10	SF; 780	R128; 10	R32; 65	W 1000	R64; 10	R64; 10	QF; 190	A 0	W 470	SF; 185	F 180	SF; 110	R16; 105	R16; 55	3,610	19	2
10	(France) Kristina Mladenovic	R128; 10	QF; 430	R64; 70	R128; 10	SF; 390	R64; 10	F 650	R64; 10	R16; 105	R16; 30‡	W 470	F 305	F 180	QF; 100	QF; 60	R16; 55	2,885	22	1
11	(Russia) Svetlana Kuznetsova	R16; 240	R16; 240	QF; 430	R64; 70	F 650	R16; 120	SF; 390	R64; 10	QF; 190	R16; 105	QF; 100	QF; 100	QF; 100	R16; 55	R16; 55	R32; 1	2,856	16	0
12	(United States) CoCo Vandeweghe	SF; 780	R128; 10	QF; 430	SF; 780	R64; 10	R64; 10	QF; 215	R32; 65	R64; 1	R64; 1	F 305	QF; 100	R16; 55	R16; 55	R32; 1	R64; 1	2,819	16	0
13	(United States) Sloane Stephens	A 0	A 0	R128; 10	W 2000	A 0	A 0	A 0	R64; 10	SF; 350	SF; 350	R32; 1	R64; 1					2,722	7	1
14	(Russia) Anastasia Pavlyuchenkova	QF; 430	R64; 70	R128; 10	R128; 10	QF; 215	R32; 65	R64; 10	R32; 65	R16; 105	QF; 100‡	F 305	W 280	W 280	W 280	QF; 100	QF; 100	2,425	24	3
15	(Latvia) Anastasija Sevastova	R32; 130	R32; 130	R64; 70	QF; 430	R64; 10	R64; 10	SF; 390	R64; 10	SF; 350	R16; 105	W 280	QF; 100	QF; 100	QF; 60	QF; 60	R32; 60	2,295	23	1
16	(United States) Madison Keys	A 0	R64; 70	R64; 70	F 1300	R16; 120	R32; 65	R64; 10	A 0	R16; 105	R64; 1	W 470	R64; 1	R32; 1				2,213	13	1
17	(Russia) Elena Vesnina	R32; 130	R32; 130	R64; 70	R32; 130	W 1000	R64; 10	R64; 10	R16; 120	R16; 105	R16; 105	QF; 100	R32; 60	R32; 60	R16; 55	R16; 55	R16; 55	2,195	23	1
18	(Germany) Julia Görges	R64; 70	R128; 10	R128; 10	R16; 240	R32; 65	R32; 65	R64; 10	R32; 65	QF; 190	R16; 105	W 470	F 180	F 180	F 180	SF; 110	SF; 110	2,060	22	1
19	(Germany) Angelique Kerber	R16; 240	R128; 10	R16; 240	R128; 10	R16; 120	QF; 215	R16; 120	R32; 65	SF; 350	R16; 105	SF; 185	F 180	QF; 100	QF; 100	R16; 1	R16; 1	2,042	20	0
20	(Australia) Ashleigh Barty	R32; 130	R128; 10	R128; 10	R32; 130	Q3; 14†	R64; 35	Q2; 20†	R32; 10	F 585	R16; 135	F 305	W 298	R16; 135	QF; 78	QF; 60	R16; 55	2,031	17	1
21	(United States) Serena Williams	W 2000	A 0	A 0	A 0	A 0	A 0	A 0	A 0			R16; 30						2,030	2	1
22	(Slovakia) Magdaléna Rybáriková	SF; 18†	R64; 70	SF; 780	R32; 130	Q3; 18†	SF; 18†	W 115†	R32; 65	R32; 60	Q2; 20	F 180	W 140	W 140	SF; 110	W 80	R16; 55	1,999	18	4
23	(Czech Republic) Barbora Strýcová	R16; 240	R64; 70	R64; 70	R64; 70	R32; 65	R16; 120	R32; 65	QF; 215	R16; 105	R32; 60	W 280	SF; 185	SF; 110	SF; 110	QF; 100	QF; 100	1,965	24	1
24	(Russia) Daria Kasatkina	R128; 10	R32; 130	R64; 70	R16; 240	R64; 10	R64; 10	R64; 10	QF; 215	R16; 105	R32; 60	W 470	F 305	QF; 100	QF; 100	R32; 60	R16; 55	1,950	21	1
25	(Australia) Daria Gavrilova	R16; 240	R128; 10	R128; 10	R64; 70	R32; 65	R64; 10	R64; 10	R16; 120	QF; 220	R32; 60	W 470	F 180	F 180	QF; 100	R32; 60	QF; 60	1,865	22	1
26	(Slovakia) Dominika Cibulková	R32; 130	R64; 70	R32; 130	R64; 70	R16; 120	R16; 120	R32; 65	R64; 10	R16; 105	R16; 105	F 305	SF; 185	SF; 185	QF; 100	QF; 100	R32; 60	1,860	22	0
27	(China) Peng Shuai	R64; 70	R128; 10	R32; 130	R64; 70	R16; 150	R32; 65	R64; 10	R16; 120	R16; 105	F 95‡	W 280	F 180	W 140	SF; 110	SF; 110	QF; 100	1,745	25	2

† The player's ranking at the time did not qualify her to play this event. Accordingly, the player's next best result is counted in its place.

‡ The player was not a Top 20 player at the end of 2016 and therefore not required to count her two best Premier 5 results. Accordingly, the player's next best result is counted in its place.

=== Doubles ===
Country	Player	Country	Player	Rank^{1}
ROU	Raluca Olaru	UKR	Olga Savchuk	69
POL	Alicja Rosolska	GBR	Anna Smith	77
CHN	Lu Jingjing	CHN	Zhang Shuai	182
CHN	Duan Yingying	CHN	Han Xinyun	275

- ^{1} Rankings as of 23 October 2017

==== Other entrants ====
The following pairs received wildcards into the doubles draw:

- (China) Jiang Xinyu / (China) Tang Qianhui
- (China) Liang Chen / (China) Yang Zhaoxuan

== Champions ==
=== Singles ===
- (Germany) Julia Görges def. (United States) CoCo Vandeweghe, 7–5, 6–1.

=== Doubles ===
- (China) Duan Yingying / (China) Han Xinyun def. (China) Lu Jingjing / (China) Zhang Shuai, 6–2, 6–1.

== See also ==
- 2017 WTA Finals
- 2017 ATP World Tour Finals
- 2017 Next Generation ATP Finals
