= 2017 WTA Awards =

2017 Women's Tennis Association Awards

Details

Achievements (singles)

Awards
- Player of the year: (Spain) Garbiñe Muguruza
- Most improved player of the year: (Latvia) Jeļena Ostapenko
- Newcomer of the year: (United States) Catherine Bellis
- Comeback player of the year: (United States) Sloane Stephens

The 2017 WTA Awards are a series of awards given by the Women's Tennis Association to players who have achieved something remarkable during the 2017 WTA Tour.

== The awards ==
These awards are decided by either the media, the players, the association, or the fans. Nominees were announced by the WTA's Twitter account.

Note: award winners in bold

=== Player of the Year ===
- (Spain) **Garbiñe Muguruza**
- (Romania) Simona Halep
- (Latvia) Jeļena Ostapenko
- (Czech Republic) Karolína Plíšková
- (Ukraine) Elina Svitolina
- (United States) Venus Williams

=== Doubles Team of the Year ===
- **(Chinese Taipei) Chan Yung-jan & (Switzerland) Martina Hingis**
- (Russia) Ekaterina Makarova & (Russia) Elena Vesnina
- (United States) Bethanie Mattek-Sands & (Czech Republic) Lucie Šafářová

=== Most Improved Player of the Year ===
- (France) Caroline Garcia
- (France) Kristina Mladenovic
- (Latvia) **Jeļena Ostapenko**
- (Ukraine) Elina Svitolina
- (United States) CoCo Vandeweghe

=== Newcomer of the Year ===
- (United States) **Catherine Bellis**
- (Brazil) Beatriz Haddad Maia
- (Belgium) Elise Mertens
- (Czech Republic) Markéta Vondroušová

=== Comeback Player of the Year ===
- (United States) **Sloane Stephens**
- (Australia) Ashleigh Barty
- (United States) Madison Keys
- (Czech Republic) Petra Kvitová

=== Karen Krantzcke Sportsmanship Award ===
- (Czech Republic) **Petra Kvitová**

=== Peachy Kellmeyer Player Service Award ===
- (Czech Republic) **Lucie Šafářová**

=== Diamond Aces ===
- (Germany) **Angelique Kerber**

=== Fan Favourite Player ===
- (United States) Serena Williams
- (Russia) Elena Vesnina
- (Russia) Maria Sharapova
- (Spain) Garbiñe Muguruza
- (Romania) **Simona Halep**
- (Australia) Ashleigh Barty
- (United States) CoCo Vandeweghe
- (Czech Republic) Lucie Šafářová
- (Slovakia) Dominika Cibulková
- (France) Caroline Garcia
- (United Kingdom) Johanna Konta
- (Poland) Agnieszka Radwańska
- (France) Kristina Mladenovic
- (Czech Republic) Petra Kvitová
- (Denmark) Caroline Wozniacki
- (Ukraine) Elina Svitolina
- (Canada) Eugenie Bouchard
- (United States) Venus Williams
- (United States) Catherine Bellis
- (China) Peng Shuai
- (Czech Republic) Karolína Plíšková
- (Germany) Julia Görges
- (United States) Sloane Stephens
- (Germany) Angelique Kerber
- (Russia) Svetlana Kuznetsova
- (Latvia) Jeļena Ostapenko

=== Fan Favorite WTA Shot of the Year ===
- (Poland) Agnieszka Radwańska, 2017 Sydney International second round (27%)
- (Denmark) Caroline Wozniacki, 2017 Miami Open quarterfinals (8%)
- (Russia) Daria Kasatkina, 2017 Canadian Open first round (10%)
- (Poland) **Agnieszka Radwańska, 2017 Wuhan Open second round (55%)** ()

=== Fan Favorite WTA Match of the Year ===
- **(France) Caroline Garcia vs (Ukraine) Elina Svitolina, China Open quarterfinals (6–7, 7–5, 7–6)**()

=== Fan Favorite Grand Slam Match of the Year ===
- **(Russia) Maria Sharapova vs (Romania) Simona Halep, US Open first round (6–4, 4–6, 6–3)**()
