= 2017 Qatar Total Open – Singles =

Singles
- 2017 Qatar Total Open

Final
- Champion: (Czech Republic) Karolína Plíšková
- Runner-up: (Denmark) Caroline Wozniacki
- Score: 6–3, 6–4

Details
- Draw: 28 (4 Q / 2 WC )
- Seeds: 8

Events
Singles	Doubles
- Qatar Total Open

Karolína Plíšková defeated Caroline Wozniacki in the final, 6–3 6–4 to win the singles tennis title at the 2017 WTA Qatar Open.

Carla Suárez Navarro was the reigning champion, but withdrew before the tournament due to a right shoulder injury.

== Seeds ==
The top four seeds received a bye into the second round.

1. (Germany) Angelique Kerber (second round)
2. (Czech Republic) Karolína Plíšková (champion)
3. (Slovakia) Dominika Cibulková (semifinals)
4. (Poland) Agnieszka Radwańska (second round)
5. (Spain) Garbiñe Muguruza (second round)
6. (Russia) Elena Vesnina (second round)
7. (Switzerland) Timea Bacsinszky (first round, retired)
8. (Czech Republic) Barbora Strýcová (second round)

== Draw ==
Key

- Q = Qualifier
- WC = Wild card
- LL = Lucky loser
- Alt = Alternate
- ITF = ITF entry
- PR = Protected ranking
- SR = Special ranking
- SE = Special exempt
- JE = Junior exempt
- JR = Junior Accelerator Programme entrant
- CO = College Accelerator Programme entrant
- NG = Next Gen Accelerator Program entrant
- w/o = Walkover
- r = Retired
- d = Defaulted

=== Finals ===
Semifinals
(Puerto Rico) Monica Puig	1	2
(Denmark) Caroline Wozniacki	6	6
3	(Slovakia) Dominika Cibulková	4	6	3
2	(Czech Republic) Karolína Plíšková	6	4	6

Final
(Denmark) Caroline Wozniacki	3	4
2	(Czech Republic) Karolína Plíšková	6	6

=== Top half ===
First round
(Romania) I-C Begu	6	1	5
(Russia) D Kasatkina	3	6	7
(Germany) L Siegemund	0	1
(Puerto Rico) M Puig	6	6
(Kazakhstan) Y Putintseva	6	0
7	(Switzerland) T Bacsinszky	1	0^{r}
(Denmark) C Wozniacki	6	6
(Netherlands) K Bertens	2	3
(Italy) R Vinci	2	3
Q	(United States) L Davis	6	6
Q	(United States) C McHale	7	3	6^{7}
6	(Russia) E Vesnina	5	6	7^{9}

Second round
1	(Germany) A Kerber	4	6	4
(Russia) D Kasatkina	6	0	6
(Puerto Rico) M Puig	6	4	2
(Kazakhstan) Y Putintseva	2	6	1^{r}
4	(Poland) A Radwańska	5	3
(Denmark) C Wozniacki	7	6
Q	(United States) L Davis	7	6
6	(Russia) E Vesnina	5	2

Quarterfinals
(Russia) D Kasatkina	6	5	4
(Puerto Rico) M Puig	4	7	6
(Denmark) C Wozniacki	7	6
Q	(United States) L Davis	5	1

Semifinals
(Puerto Rico) M Puig	1	2
(Denmark) C Wozniacki	6	6

=== Bottom half ===
First round
8	(Czech Republic) B Strýcová	6	6
WC	(Oman) F Al-Nabhani	3	0
(Latvia) A Sevastova	5	4
(Australia) S Stosur	7	6
Q	(Serbia) J Janković	1	4
(Russia) A Pavlyuchenkova	6	6
5	(Spain) G Muguruza	6	6
WC	(Turkey) Ç Büyükakçay	3	2
(China) S Zhang	7^{7}	6
(Hungary) T Babos	6^{4}	3
Q	(United States) M Brengle	2	6	3
(France) C Garcia	6	4	6

Second round
8	(Czech Republic) B Strýcová	3	6	4
(Australia) S Stosur	6	3	6
(Russia) A Pavlyuchenkova	5	6	2
3	(Slovakia) D Cibulková	7	2	6
5	(Spain) G Muguruza	6^{3}	6	5
(China) S Zhang	7^{7}	3	7
(France) C Garcia	5	4
2	(Czech Republic) Ka Plíšková	7	6

Quarterfinals
(Australia) S Stosur	5	4
3	(Slovakia) D Cibulková	7	6
(China) S Zhang	2	0
2	(Czech Republic) Ka Plíšková	6	6

Semifinals
3	(Slovakia) D Cibulková	4	6	3
2	(Czech Republic) Ka Plíšková	6	4	6

== Qualifying ==
=== Seeds ===
1. (United States) Christina McHale (qualified)
2. (Serbia) Jelena Janković (qualified)
3. (United States) Lauren Davis (qualified)
4. (Czech Republic) Kristýna Plíšková (second round)
5. (China) Peng Shuai (first round)
6. (Sweden) Johanna Larsson (qualifying competition)
7. (Germany) Annika Beck (second round)
8. (Bulgaria) Tsvetana Pironkova (qualifying competition)

=== Qualifiers ===
1. (United States) Christina McHale
2. (Serbia) Jelena Janković
3. (United States) Lauren Davis
4. (United States) Madison Brengle

=== Draw ===
==== First qualifier ====
First round
1	(United States) Christina McHale	6	7^{7}
WC	(Tunisia) Ons Jabeur	4	6^{3}
(Ukraine) Kateryna Bondarenko	6	6
WC	(Qatar) Mubaraka Al-Naimi	2	0
(Ukraine) Kateryna Kozlova	3	3
(Russia) Ekaterina Alexandrova	6	6
(Spain) Sílvia Soler Espinosa	3	6	1
6	(Sweden) Johanna Larsson	6	4	6

Second round
1	(United States) Christina McHale	7	6
(Ukraine) Kateryna Bondarenko	5	1
(Russia) Ekaterina Alexandrova	2	6	2
6	(Sweden) Johanna Larsson	6	3	6

Qualifying competition
1	(United States) Christina McHale	7	6
6	(Sweden) Johanna Larsson	6^{4}	4

==== Second qualifier ====
First round
2/WC	(Serbia) Jelena Janković	7	4	6
(Japan) Nao Hibino	5	6	3
(Brazil) Paula Cristina Gonçalves	1	1
(Japan) Risa Ozaki	6	6
(Russia) Evgeniya Rodina	7	4	6
(France) Océane Dodin	5	6	1
(United States) Vania King	3	3
8	(Bulgaria) Tsvetana Pironkova	6	6

Second round
2/WC	(Serbia) Jelena Janković	6	6
(Japan) Risa Ozaki	4	3
(Russia) Evgeniya Rodina	5	3
8	(Bulgaria) Tsvetana Pironkova	7	6

Qualifying competition
2/WC	(Serbia) Jelena Janković	6	6^{6}	6
8	(Bulgaria) Tsvetana Pironkova	1	7^{8}	4

==== Third qualifier ====
First round
3	(United States) Lauren Davis	6	6
(United States) Julia Boserup	2	2
(Russia) Anastasia Pivovarova	4	2
(China) Wang Qiang	6	6
(Russia) Irina Khromacheva	3	2
(Italy) Camila Giorgi	6	6
(United Kingdom) Naomi Broady	6	5	2
7	(Germany) Annika Beck	4	7	6

Second round
3	(United States) Lauren Davis	6	6
(China) Wang Qiang	3	3
(Italy) Camila Giorgi	6	4	6
7	(Germany) Annika Beck	2	6	3

Qualifying competition
3	(United States) Lauren Davis	5	5
(Italy) Camila Giorgi	7	2^{r}

==== Fourth qualifier ====
First round
4	(Czech Republic) Kristýna Plíšková	1	6	6
WC	(Germany) Mona Barthel	6	3	2
(United States) Madison Brengle	6	6
(Montenegro) Danka Kovinić	1	1
(China) Zheng Saisai	6	0
(Japan) Kurumi Nara	2	0^{r}
(United States) Catherine Bellis	6	6
5	(China) Peng Shuai	3	3

Second round
4	(Czech Republic) Kristýna Plíšková	6	1	3
(United States) Madison Brengle	4	6	6
(China) Zheng Saisai	6	5	6
(United States) Catherine Bellis	2	7	2

Qualifying competition
(United States) Madison Brengle	6	6
(China) Zheng Saisai	2	1
