= 2017 Porsche Tennis Grand Prix – Doubles =

Doubles
- 2017 Porsche Tennis Grand Prix

Final
- Champions: (United States) Raquel Atawo (Latvia) Jeļena Ostapenko
- Runners-up: (United States) Abigail Spears (Slovenia) Katarina Srebotnik
- Score: 6–4, 6–4

Details
- Draw: 16
- Seeds: 4

Events
Singles	Doubles
- Porsche Tennis Grand Prix

Caroline Garcia and Kristina Mladenovic were the defending champions, but chose not to participate this year.

Raquel Atawo and Jeļena Ostapenko won the title, defeating Abigail Spears and Katarina Srebotnik in the final, 6–4, 6–4.

== Seeds ==
1. (United States) Abigail Spears / (Slovenia) Katarina Srebotnik (final)
2. (Slovenia) Andreja Klepač / (Spain) María José Martínez Sánchez (first round)
3. (United States) Raquel Atawo / (Latvia) Jeļena Ostapenko (champions)
4. (Germany) Anna-Lena Grönefeld / (Czech Republic) Květa Peschke (semifinals)

== Draw ==
Key

- Q = Qualifier
- WC = Wild card
- LL = Lucky loser
- Alt = Alternate
- ITF = ITF entry
- PR = Protected ranking
- SR = Special ranking
- SE = Special exempt
- JE = Junior exempt
- JR = Junior Accelerator Programme entrant
- CO = College Accelerator Programme entrant
- NG = Next Gen Accelerator Program entrant
- w/o = Walkover
- r = Retired
- d = Defaulted

=== Draw ===
First round
1	(United States) A Spears (Slovenia) K Srebotnik	6	6
(Russia) E Rodina (Latvia) A Sevastova	2	1
WC	(Germany) A Beck (Germany) A Zaja	3	5
(United States) A Muhammad (Germany) L Siegemund	6	7
4	(Germany) A-L Grönefeld (Czech Republic) K Peschke	7	6
(Chinese Taipei) C-j Chuang (China) C Liang	5	1
(Romania) R Olaru (Ukraine) O Savchuk	6	4	[10]
(Ukraine) L Kichenok (Ukraine) L Tsurenko	2	6	[12]
(Croatia) A Konjuh (United States) V Lepchenko	1	7	[4]
(United Kingdom) N Broady (United Kingdom) A Smith	6	5	[10]
(Switzerland) X Knoll (Netherlands) D Schuurs	2	2
3	(United States) R Atawo (Latvia) J Ostapenko	6	6
(Czech Republic) A Hlaváčková (Australia) S Stosur	7	6
(Croatia) D Jurak (Croatia) M Lučić-Baroni	5	1
(Romania) S Halep (Poland) A Rosolska	6	2	[10]
2	(Slovenia) A Klepač (Spain) MJ Martínez Sánchez	0	6	[8]

Quarterfinals
1	(United States) A Spears (Slovenia) K Srebotnik	6	7^{7}
(United States) A Muhammad (Germany) L Siegemund	1	6^{4}
4	(Germany) A-L Grönefeld (Czech Republic) K Peschke	w/o
(Ukraine) L Kichenok (Ukraine) L Tsurenko
(United Kingdom) N Broady (United Kingdom) A Smith	5	4
3	(United States) R Atawo (Latvia) J Ostapenko	7	6
(Czech Republic) A Hlaváčková (Australia) S Stosur	6	6
(Romania) S Halep (Poland) A Rosolska	4	4

Semifinals
1	(United States) A Spears (Slovenia) K Srebotnik	6	6
4	(Germany) A-L Grönefeld (Czech Republic) K Peschke	4	3
3	(United States) R Atawo (Latvia) J Ostapenko	7	2	[10]
(Czech Republic) A Hlaváčková (Australia) S Stosur	5	6	[8]

Final
1	(United States) A Spears (Slovenia) K Srebotnik	4	4
3	(United States) R Atawo (Latvia) J Ostapenko	6	6
