= 2017 Western & Southern Open – Women's doubles =

Women's doubles
- 2017 Western & Southern Open

Final
- Champions: (Chinese Taipei) Chan Yung-jan (Switzerland) Martina Hingis
- Runners-up: (Chinese Taipei) Hsieh Su-wei (Romania) Monica Niculescu
- Score: 4–6, 6–4, [10–7]

Details
- Seeds: 8

Events
Singles	men	women
Doubles	men	women
← 2016 ·	Western & Southern Open	· 2018 →

Sania Mirza and Barbora Strýcová were the defending champions, but chose not to participate together. Mirza played alongside Peng Shuai, but lost in the semifinals to Hsieh Su-wei and Monica Niculescu. Strýcová teamed up with Lucie Šafářová, but lost in the semifinals to Chan Yung-jan and Martina Hingis.

Chan and Hingis went on to win the title, defeating Hsieh and Niculescu in the final, 4–6, 6–4, [10–7].

As a result of Bethanie Mattek-Sands' absence due to injury, Šafářová attained the WTA no. 1 doubles ranking at the end of the tournament after reaching the semifinals with Strýcová.

== Seeds ==
All seeds received a bye into the second round.

1. (Russia) Ekaterina Makarova / (Russia) Elena Vesnina (withdrew)
2. (Chinese Taipei) Chan Yung-jan / (Switzerland) Martina Hingis (champions)
3. (Czech Republic) Lucie Šafářová / (Czech Republic) Barbora Strýcová (semifinals)
4. (India) Sania Mirza / (China) Peng Shuai (semifinals)
5. (Hungary) Tímea Babos / (Czech Republic) Andrea Hlaváčková (quarterfinals)
6. (Czech Republic) Lucie Hradecká / (Czech Republic) Kateřina Siniaková (first round)
7. (Australia) Ashleigh Barty / (Australia) Casey Dellacqua (quarterfinals)
8. (United States) Abigail Spears / (Slovenia) Katarina Srebotnik (first round)

== Draw ==
=== Key ===
- Q = Qualifier
- WC = Wild card
- LL = Lucky loser
- Alt = Alternate
- ITF = ITF entry
- PR = Protected ranking
- SR = Special ranking
- SE = Special exempt
- JE = Junior exempt
- JR = Junior Accelerator Programme entrant
- CO = College Accelerator Programme entrant
- NG = Next Gen Accelerator Program entrant
- w/o = Walkover
- r = Retired
- d = Defaulted

=== Finals ===
Semifinals
(Chinese Taipei) Hsieh Su-wei (Romania) Monica Niculescu	6	7^{8}
4	(India) Sania Mirza (China) Peng Shuai	4	6^{6}
3	(Czech Republic) Lucie Šafářová (Czech Republic) Barbora Strýcová	6^{5}	2
2	(Chinese Taipei) Chan Yung-jan (Switzerland) Martina Hingis	7^{7}	6

Final
(Chinese Taipei) Hsieh Su-wei (Romania) Monica Niculescu	6	4	[7]
2	(Chinese Taipei) Chan Yung-jan (Switzerland) Martina Hingis	4	6	[10]

=== Top half ===
First round
(Canada) G Dabrowski (Latvia) J Ostapenko	7	7^{7}
(Netherlands) K Bertens (Belgium) K Flipkens	5	6^{5}
(Chinese Taipei) S-w Hsieh (Romania) M Niculescu	6	6
(United Kingdom) J Konta (United States) C McHale	2	2
(France) K Mladenovic (Russia) A Pavlyuchenkova	7^{7}	7
6	(Czech Republic) L Hradecká (Czech Republic) K Siniaková	6^{4}	5
(United States) V Lepchenko (Slovakia) M Rybáriková	6^{2}	4
(Germany) J Görges (Ukraine) O Savchuk	7^{7}	6
(Japan) S Aoyama (Croatia) D Jurak	6	7
(United States) L Davis (United States) A Riske	2	5
(Romania) I-C Begu (Romania) R Olaru	3	7	[10]
8	(United States) A Spears (Slovenia) K Srebotnik	6	5	[6]

Second round
Alt	(Ukraine) L Kichenok (Ukraine) L Tsurenko	6	6
(Canada) G Dabrowski (Latvia) J Ostapenko	2	1
(Chinese Taipei) S-w Hsieh (Romania) M Niculescu	6^{4}	7	[10]
(France) K Mladenovic (Russia) A Pavlyuchenkova	7^{7}	5	[8]
4	(India) S Mirza (China) S Peng	7	6
(Germany) J Görges (Ukraine) O Savchuk	5	4
(Japan) S Aoyama (Croatia) D Jurak	6^{2}	6	[6]
(Romania) I-C Begu (Romania) R Olaru	7^{7}	1	[10]

Quarterfinals
Alt	(Ukraine) L Kichenok (Ukraine) L Tsurenko	2	5
(Chinese Taipei) S-w Hsieh (Romania) M Niculescu	6	7
4	(India) S Mirza (China) S Peng	6	6^{1}	[10]
(Romania) I-C Begu (Romania) R Olaru	3	7^{7}	[3]

Semifinals
(Chinese Taipei) S-w Hsieh (Romania) M Niculescu	6	7^{8}
4	(India) S Mirza (China) S Peng	4	6^{6}

=== Bottom half ===
First round
7	(Australia) A Barty (Australia) C Dellacqua	6	6
WC	(United States) A Glatch (United States) C McNally	2	4
(Australia) D Gavrilova (Russia) D Kasatkina	7^{7}	0	[10]
(Ukraine) N Kichenok (Australia) An Rodionova	6^{4}	6	[8]
(Latvia) A Sevastova (Croatia) D Vekić	6	3	[5]
(Russia) A Kudryavtseva (Poland) A Rosolska	3	6	[10]
5	(Hungary) T Babos (Czech Republic) A Hlaváčková	7	6
(Germany) A-L Grönefeld (Czech Republic) K Peschke	5	1
(Belgium) E Mertens (Netherlands) D Schuurs	2	2
(Slovenia) A Klepač (Spain) MJ Martínez Sánchez	6	6
(Chinese Taipei) C-j Chuang (Czech Republic) R Voráčová	6	4	[9]
(United States) R Atawo (United States) C Vandeweghe	4	6	[11]

Second round
7	(Australia) A Barty (Australia) C Dellacqua	6	6
(Australia) D Gavrilova (Russia) D Kasatkina	4	1
(Russia) A Kudryavtseva (Poland) A Rosolska	1	6^{3}
3	(Czech Republic) L Šafářová (Czech Republic) B Strýcová	6	7^{7}
5	(Hungary) T Babos (Czech Republic) A Hlaváčková	2	7^{7}	[10]
(Slovenia) A Klepač (Spain) MJ Martínez Sánchez	6	6^{4}	[7]
(United States) R Atawo (United States) C Vandeweghe	4	6	[7]
2	(Chinese Taipei) Y-j Chan (Switzerland) M Hingis	6	4	[10]

Quarterfinals
7	(Australia) A Barty (Australia) C Dellacqua	3	6^{4}
3	(Czech Republic) L Šafářová (Czech Republic) B Strýcová	6	7^{7}
5	(Hungary) T Babos (Czech Republic) A Hlaváčková	3	2
2	(Chinese Taipei) Y-j Chan (Switzerland) M Hingis	6	6

Semifinals
3	(Czech Republic) L Šafářová (Czech Republic) B Strýcová	6^{5}	2
2	(Chinese Taipei) Y-j Chan (Switzerland) M Hingis	7^{7}	6
