= 2017 Porsche Tennis Grand Prix – Singles =

Singles
- 2017 Porsche Tennis Grand Prix

Final
- Champion: (Germany) Laura Siegemund
- Runner-up: (France) Kristina Mladenovic
- Score: 6–1, 2–6, 7–6^{(7–5)}

Details
- Draw: 28
- Seeds: 8

Events
| Singles | Doubles |
- Porsche Tennis Grand Prix

Angelique Kerber was the two-time defending champion, but she lost in the second round to Kristina Mladenovic.

Laura Siegemund won the title, defeating Mladenovic in the final, 6–1, 2–6, 7–6^{(7–5)}.

As a result of Kerber's loss, Serena Williams regained the world No. 1 ranking, despite being on pregnancy leave. This tournament also marked the return of Maria Sharapova to the WTA Tour, after serving a 15-month suspension for doping offences.

== Seeds ==
The top four seeds receive a bye into the second round.

1. (Germany) Angelique Kerber (second round)
2. (Czech Republic) Karolína Plíšková (quarterfinals)
3. (Slovakia) Dominika Cibulková (withdrew due to a wrist injury)
4. (Romania) Simona Halep (semifinals)
5. (Spain) Garbiñe Muguruza (second round)
6. (United Kingdom) Johanna Konta (second round)
7. (Poland) Agnieszka Radwańska (first round)
8. (Russia) Svetlana Kuznetsova (second round)

== Draw ==
Key

- Q = Qualifier
- WC = Wild card
- LL = Lucky loser
- Alt = Alternate
- ITF = ITF entry
- PR = Protected ranking
- SR = Special ranking
- SE = Special exempt
- JE = Junior exempt
- JR = Junior Accelerator Programme entrant
- CO = College Accelerator Programme entrant
- NG = Next Gen Accelerator Program entrant
- w/o = Walkover
- r = Retired
- d = Defaulted

=== Finals ===
Semifinals
(France) Kristina Mladenovic | 3 | 7 | 6
WC | (Russia) Maria Sharapova | 6 | 5 | 4
4 | (Romania) Simona Halep | 4 | 5
WC | (Germany) Laura Siegemund | 6 | 7

Final
(France) Kristina Mladenovic | 1 | 6 | 6^{5}
WC | (Germany) Laura Siegemund | 6 | 2 | 7^{7}

=== Top half ===
First round
(France) K Mladenovic | 6 | 6
(Croatia) M Lučić-Baroni | 4 | 2
(Russia) E Vesnina | 7^{7} | 6
(Russia) D Kasatkina | 6^{2} | 2
(Spain) C Suárez Navarro | 6 | 6
Q | (Germany) T Korpatsch | 2 | 4
Q | (Estonia) A Kontaveit | 7^{7} | 6
(Croatia) A Konjuh | 6^{5} | 4
WC | (Russia) M Sharapova | 7 | 6
(Italy) R Vinci | 5 | 3
(Russia) E Makarova | 6 | 6
7 | (Poland) A Radwańska | 2 | 4

Second round
1 | (Germany) A Kerber | 2 | 5
(France) K Mladenovic | 6 | 7
(Russia) E Vesnina | 2 | 4
(Spain) C Suárez Navarro | 6 | 6
5 | (Spain) G Muguruza | 6 | 6^{1} | 1
Q | (Estonia) A Kontaveit | 2 | 7^{7} | 6
WC | (Russia) M Sharapova | 7 | 6
(Russia) E Makarova | 5 | 1

Quarterfinals
(France) K Mladenovic | 6 | 6
(Spain) C Suárez Navarro | 3 | 2
Q | (Estonia) A Kontaveit | 3 | 4
WC | (Russia) M Sharapova | 6 | 6

Semifinals
(France) K Mladenovic | 3 | 7 | 6
WC | (Russia) M Sharapova | 6 | 5 | 4

=== Bottom half ===
First round
6/WC | (United Kingdom) J Konta | 7^{7} | 3 | 6
Q | (Japan) N Osaka | 6^{5} | 6 | 1
(Latvia) A Sevastova | 6 | 4 | 6
(Australia) S Stosur | 1 | 6 | 3
LL | (United States) J Brady | 2 | 2
(Czech Republic) B Strýcová | 6 | 6
8 | (Russia) S Kuznetsova | 6 | 5 | 6
(Netherlands) K Bertens | 3 | 7 | 3
(China) S Zhang | 2 | 6^{4}
WC | (Germany) L Siegemund | 6 | 7^{7}
(United States) C Vandeweghe | 7^{7} | 7^{7}
Q | (Latvia) J Ostapenko | 6^{3} | 6^{3}

Second round
6/WC | (United Kingdom) J Konta | 3 | 5
(Latvia) A Sevastova | 6 | 7
(Czech Republic) B Strýcová | 2 | 3
4 | (Romania) S Halep | 6 | 6
8 | (Russia) S Kuznetsova | 4 | 3
WC | (Germany) L Siegemund | 6 | 6
(United States) C Vandeweghe | 6^{2} | 4
2 | (Czech Republic) Ka Plíšková | 7^{7} | 6

Quarterfinals
(Latvia) A Sevastova | 3 | 1
4 | (Romania) S Halep | 6 | 6
WC | (Germany) L Siegemund | 7^{7} | 5 | 6
2 | (Czech Republic) Ka Plíšková | 6^{3} | 7 | 3

Semifinals
4 | (Romania) S Halep | 4 | 5
WC | (Germany) L Siegemund | 6 | 7

== Qualifying ==
=== Seeds ===
1. (Japan) Naomi Osaka (qualified)
2. (Latvia) Jeļena Ostapenko (qualified)
3. (France) Océane Dodin (second round)
4. (Germany) Annika Beck (first round)
5. (Japan) Risa Ozaki (first round)
6. (United States) Varvara Lepchenko (first round)
7. (Estonia) Anett Kontaveit (qualified)
8. (United States) Jennifer Brady (qualifying competition, lucky loser)

=== Qualifiers ===
1. (Japan) Naomi Osaka
2. (Latvia) Jeļena Ostapenko
3. (Germany) Tamara Korpatsch
4. (Estonia) Anett Kontaveit

=== Lucky loser ===
1. (United States) Jennifer Brady

=== Draw ===
==== First qualifier ====
First round
1 | (Japan) Naomi Osaka | 4 | 6 | 6
(United States) Asia Muhammad | 6 | 4 | 2
WC | (Germany) Anna Zaja | 6 | 6
(Brazil) Beatriz Haddad Maia | 4 | 3
(United States) Sachia Vickery | 6 | 6
(Russia) Valeriya Solovyeva | 2 | 2
WC | (Germany) Katharina Hobgarski | 3 | 6 | 6
5 | (Japan) Risa Ozaki | 6 | 3 | 4

Second round
1 | (Japan) Naomi Osaka | 5 | 6 | 7^{10}
WC | (Germany) Anna Zaja | 7 | 3 | 6^{8}
(United States) Sachia Vickery | 6 | 6^{8} | 4
WC | (Germany) Katharina Hobgarski | 4 | 7^{10} | 6

Qualifying competition
1 | (Japan) Naomi Osaka | 7 | 6
WC | (Germany) Katharina Hobgarski | 5 | 2

==== Second qualifier ====
First round
2 | (Latvia) Jeļena Ostapenko | 6 | 7^{7}
WC | (Germany) Lena Rüffer | 2 | 6^{4}
(United Kingdom) Naomi Broady | 3 | 4
(Russia) Natalia Vikhlyantseva | 6 | 6
(Netherlands) Lesley Kerkhove | 7 | 6
WC | (Germany) Katharina Gerlach | 5 | 4
(France) Virginie Razzano | 4 | 1
8 | (United States) Jennifer Brady | 6 | 6

Second round
2 | (Latvia) Jeļena Ostapenko | 6 | 6
(Russia) Natalia Vikhlyantseva | 4 | 3
(Netherlands) Lesley Kerkhove | 5 | 2
8 | (United States) Jennifer Brady | 7 | 6

Qualifying competition
2 | (Latvia) Jeļena Ostapenko | 5 | 6 | 6
8 | (United States) Jennifer Brady | 7 | 1 | 3

==== Third qualifier ====
First round
3 | (France) Océane Dodin | 6 | 6
(Poland) Katarzyna Piter | 3 | 4
(Germany) Tamara Korpatsch | 6 | 6
(Romania) Ana Bogdan | 3 | 1
(Italy) Camila Giorgi | 6 | 3 | 3
PR | (Germany) Dinah Pfizenmaier | 3 | 6 | 6
(Russia) Evgeniya Rodina | 2 | 6 | 6
6 | (United States) Varvara Lepchenko | 6 | 1 | 3

Second round
3 | (France) Océane Dodin | 6 | 3 | 6^{3}
(Germany) Tamara Korpatsch | 2 | 6 | 7^{7}
PR | (Germany) Dinah Pfizenmaier | 2 | 1
(Russia) Evgeniya Rodina | 6 | 6

Qualifying competition
(Germany) Tamara Korpatsch | 6 | 4 | 6
(Russia) Evgeniya Rodina | 2 | 6 | 1

==== Fourth qualifier ====
First round
4 | (Germany) Annika Beck | 6^{4} | 4
(Czech Republic) Lucie Hradecká | 7^{7} | 6
(Bulgaria) Isabella Shinikova | 0 | 6 | 3
(Switzerland) Amra Sadiković | 6 | 4 | 6
(Germany) Antonia Lottner | 7 | 1 | 6
(Colombia) Mariana Duque Mariño | 5 | 6 | 4
(Ukraine) Kateryna Bondarenko | 5 | 3
7 | (Estonia) Anett Kontaveit | 7 | 6

Second round
(Czech Republic) Lucie Hradecká | 6 | 4 | 6
(Switzerland) Amra Sadiković | 3 | 6 | 3
(Germany) Antonia Lottner | 3 | 4
7 | (Estonia) Anett Kontaveit | 6 | 6

Qualifying competition
(Czech Republic) Lucie Hradecká | 3 | 7^{7} | 1
7 | (Estonia) Anett Kontaveit | 6 | 6^{0} | 6
