= 2017 Western & Southern Open – Men's singles =

Men's singles
- 2017 Western & Southern Open

Final
- Champion: (Bulgaria) Grigor Dimitrov
- Runner-up: (Australia) Nick Kyrgios
- Score: 6–3, 7–5

Details
- Draw: 64 (7 Q / 4 WC )
- Seeds: 16

Events
Singles	men	women
Doubles	men	women
- Western & Southern Open

Grigor Dimitrov defeated Nick Kyrgios in the final, 6–3, 7–5 to win the men's singles tennis title at the 2017 Cincinnati Masters. It was his first ATP Masters 1000 title, and he did not lose a set en route.

Marin Čilić was the reigning champion, but did not participate this year.

Given the withdrawals of Novak Djokovic, Andy Murray, and Roger Federer (all due to injury), Rafael Nadal was the only member of the Big Four to play. His loss in the quarterfinals to Kyrgios ended a streak of 42 consecutive Masters 1000 events where at least one of the four reached the final (also winning a combined 37 titles). Nonetheless, Nadal regained the world No. 1 singles ranking for the first time since July 2014. Nadal became the world No. 1 with only 7,645 ranking points, the fewest points for an ATP No. 1 since the establishment of a new ranking points distribution in 2009.

== Seeds ==
The top eight seeds receive a bye into the second round.

1. (Spain) Rafael Nadal (quarterfinals)
2. (Switzerland) ~~Roger Federer~~ (withdrew)
3. (Austria) Dominic Thiem (quarterfinals)
4. (Germany) Alexander Zverev (second round)
5. (Japan) ~~Kei Nishikori~~ (withdrew)
6. (Canada) ~~Milos Raonic~~ (withdrew)
7. (Bulgaria) Grigor Dimitrov (champion)
8. (France) Jo-Wilfried Tsonga (second round)

9. (Belgium) David Goffin (first round)
10. (Czech Republic) Tomáš Berdych (first round)
11. (Spain) Pablo Carreño Busta (third round)
12. (Spain) Roberto Bautista Agut (first round)
13. (United States) Jack Sock (first round)
14. (United States) John Isner (semifinals)
15. (United States) Sam Querrey (second round)
16. (Luxembourg) Gilles Müller (second round)

Click on the seed number of a player to go to their draw section.

== Draw ==
Key

- Q = Qualifier
- WC = Wild card
- LL = Lucky loser
- Alt = Alternate
- ITF = ITF entry
- PR = Protected ranking
- SR = Special ranking
- SE = Special exempt
- JE = Junior exempt
- JR = Junior Accelerator Programme entrant
- CO = College Accelerator Programme entrant
- NG = Next Gen Accelerator Program entrant
- w/o = Walkover
- r = Retired
- d = Defaulted

=== Finals ===
Quarterfinals
1	(Spain) Rafael Nadal	2	5
(Australia) Nick Kyrgios	6	7
3	(Austria) Dominic Thiem	3	3
(Spain) David Ferrer	6	6
WC	(United States) Jared Donaldson	6^{4}	5
14	(United States) John Isner	7^{7}	7
7	(Bulgaria) Grigor Dimitrov	6	6
(Japan) Yūichi Sugita	2	1

Semifinals
(Australia) Nick Kyrgios	7^{7}	7^{7}
(Spain) David Ferrer	6^{3}	6^{4}
14	(United States) John Isner	6^{4}	6^{10}
7	(Bulgaria) Grigor Dimitrov	7^{7}	7^{12}

Final
(Australia) Nick Kyrgios	3	5
7	(Bulgaria) Grigor Dimitrov	6	7

=== Top half ===
==== Section 1 ====
First round
(France) R Gasquet	6	6
Q	(Australia) J-P Smith	4	4
(Spain) A Ramos Viñolas	6	3	6
Q	(Russia) M Youzhny	2	6	3
(United States) R Harrison	4	7	6^{3}
16	(Luxembourg) G Müller	6	5	7^{7}
9	(Belgium) D Goffin	2	3
(Australia) N Kyrgios	6	6
(South Africa) K Anderson	4	6^{6}
Q	(Ukraine) A Dolgopolov	6	7^{8}
(Croatia) I Karlović	6	3	7
(Czech Republic) J Veselý	3	6	5

Second round
1	(Spain) R Nadal	6	6
(France) R Gasquet	3	4
(Spain) A Ramos Viñolas	5	6	6
16	(Luxembourg) G Müller	7	4	4
(Australia) N Kyrgios	6	7^{8}
Q	(Ukraine) A Dolgopolov	3	6^{6}
(Croatia) I Karlović	6	7^{11}
8	(France) J-W Tsonga	4	6^{9}

Third round
1	(Spain) R Nadal	7^{7}	6
(Spain) A Ramos Viñolas	6^{1}	2
(Australia) N Kyrgios	4	7^{8}	6
(Croatia) I Karlović	6	6^{6}	3

Quarterfinals
1	(Spain) R Nadal	2	5
(Australia) N Kyrgios	6	7

==== Section 2 ====
First round
(Italy) F Fognini	7^{7}	6
(Russia) D Medvedev	6^{5}	4
(Netherlands) R Haase	6	6^{8}	2
(France) A Mannarino	2	7^{10}	6
WC	(United States) S Kozlov	3	0
15	(United States) S Querrey	6	6
11	(Spain) P Carreño Busta	6	6
(Italy) P Lorenzi	3	3
(Germany) M Zverev	6	6
(Spain) F Verdasco	4	4
(United States) S Johnson	1	7	3
(Spain) D Ferrer	6	5	6

Second round
3	(Austria) D Thiem	6	6
(Italy) F Fognini	3	2
(France) A Mannarino	6	7^{7}
15	(United States) S Querrey	2	6^{4}
11	(Spain) P Carreño Busta	6	7^{7}
(Germany) M Zverev	3	6^{2}
(Spain) D Ferrer	6	6^{5}	6
LL	(Serbia) J Tipsarević	4	7^{7}	1

Third round
3	(Austria) D Thiem	7^{7}	7^{7}
(France) A Mannarino	6^{4}	6^{3}
11	(Spain) P Carreño Busta	4	4
(Spain) D Ferrer	6	6

Quarterfinals
3	(Austria) D Thiem	3	3
(Spain) D Ferrer	6	6

=== Bottom half ===
==== Section 3 ====
First round
(Georgia (country)) N Basilashvili	6	7^{7}
(Croatia) B Ćorić	3	6^{5}
Q	(United States) C Eubanks	7^{7}	1	4
LL	(India) R Ramanathan	6^{5}	6	6
WC	(United States) J Donaldson	7^{7}	6
12	(Spain) R Bautista Agut	6^{5}	3
14	(United States) J Isner	7^{7}	6
(Serbia) V Troicki	6^{3}	4
(United States) D Young	4	6^{4}
WC	(United States) T Paul	6	7^{7}
WC	(United States) F Tiafoe	6	7^{7}
Q	(Germany) M Marterer	3	6^{2}

Second round
LL	(United States) C Harrison	3	3
(Georgia (country)) N Basilashvili	6	6
LL	(India) R Ramanathan	4	6	4
WC	(United States) J Donaldson	6	2	6
14	(United States) J Isner	6	6
WC	(United States) T Paul	3	3
WC	(United States) F Tiafoe	4	6	6
4	(Germany) A Zverev	6	3	4

Third round
(Georgia (country)) N Basilashvili	4	6^{4}
WC	(United States) J Donaldson	6	7^{7}
14	(United States) J Isner	7^{7}	7
WC	(United States) F Tiafoe	6^{4}	5

Quarterfinals
WC	(United States) J Donaldson	6^{4}	5
14	(United States) J Isner	7^{7}	7

==== Section 4 ====
First round
(Spain) F López	7^{7}	6
(South Korea) H Chung	6^{5}	1
Q	(United States) M Krueger	6	6
(France) B Paire	2	1
(Argentina) JM del Potro	3	7^{7}	6
10	(Czech Republic) T Berdych	6	6^{1}	0
13	(United States) J Sock	5	4
(Japan) Y Sugita	7	6
(United Kingdom) K Edmund	3	6	3
Q	(Portugal) J Sousa	6	2	6
(Argentina) D Schwartzman	1	6	3
(Russia) K Khachanov	6	1	6

Second round
7	(Bulgaria) G Dimitrov	7^{7}	6
(Spain) F López	6^{5}	4
Q	(United States) M Krueger	4	4
(Argentina) JM del Potro	6	6
(Japan) Y Sugita	3	7^{7}	6
Q	(Portugal) J Sousa	6	6^{5}	1
(Russia) K Khachanov	6	6
LL	(Italy) T Fabbiano	2	2

Third round
7	(Bulgaria) G Dimitrov	6	7
(Argentina) JM del Potro	3	5
(Japan) Y Sugita	6^{0}	6	6
(Russia) K Khachanov	7^{7}	3	3

Quarterfinals
7	(Bulgaria) G Dimitrov	6	6
(Japan) Y Sugita	2	1

== Qualifying ==
=== Seeds ===
1. (Portugal) João Sousa (qualified)
2. (Russia) Andrey Rublev (first round)
3. (Serbia) Janko Tipsarević (qualifying competition, lucky loser)
4. (Serbia) Dušan Lajović (first round)
5. (Ukraine) Alexandr Dolgopolov (qualified)
6. (Canada) Vasek Pospisil (first round)
7. (Tunisia) Malek Jaziri (first round)
8. (Uzbekistan) Denis Istomin (first round)
9. (United States) Ernesto Escobedo (first round)
10. (France) Julien Benneteau (first round)
11. (Italy) Thomas Fabbiano (qualifying competition, lucky loser)
12. (Russia) Mikhail Youzhny (qualified)
13. (United States) Bjorn Fratangelo (first round)
14. (Germany) Maximilian Marterer (qualified)

=== Qualifiers ===
1. (Portugal) João Sousa
2. (Russia) Mikhail Youzhny
3. (United States) Christopher Eubanks
4. (Germany) Maximilian Marterer
5. (Ukraine) Alexandr Dolgopolov
6. (Australia) John-Patrick Smith
7. (United States) Mitchell Krueger

=== Lucky losers ===
1. (Serbia) Janko Tipsarević
2. (Italy) Thomas Fabbiano
3. (India) Ramkumar Ramanathan
4. (United States) Christian Harrison

=== Qualifying draw ===
==== First qualifier ====
First round
1	(Portugal) João Sousa	6	6
(United States) Tim Smyczek	2	3
Alt	(Croatia) Ante Pavić	7	6
9	(United States) Ernesto Escobedo	5	2

Qualifying competition
1	(Portugal) João Sousa	6	6
Alt	(Croatia) Ante Pavić	4	2

==== Second qualifier ====
First round
2	(Russia) Andrey Rublev	2	4
PR	(Latvia) Ernests Gulbis	6	6
(Moldova) Radu Albot	6	4	0
12	(Russia) Mikhail Youzhny	4	6	6

Qualifying competition
PR	(Latvia) Ernests Gulbis	6	1	4
12	(Russia) Mikhail Youzhny	4	6	6

==== Third qualifier ====
First round
3	(Serbia) Janko Tipsarević	5	6	7^{7}
WC	(United States) John McNally	7	1	6^{5}
WC	(United States) Christopher Eubanks	7^{7}	3	7^{9}
13	(United States) Bjorn Fratangelo	6^{5}	6	6^{7}

Qualifying competition
3	(Serbia) Janko Tipsarević	3	4
WC	(United States) Christopher Eubanks	6	6

==== Fourth qualifier ====
First round
4	(Serbia) Dušan Lajović	6^{1}	4
(India) Ramkumar Ramanathan	7^{7}	6
(India) Prajnesh Gunneswaran	2	6^{2}
14	(Germany) Maximilian Marterer	6	7^{7}

Qualifying competition
(India) Ramkumar Ramanathan	6^{6}	6^{2}
14	(Germany) Maximilian Marterer	7^{8}	7^{7}

==== Fifth qualifier ====
First round
5	(Ukraine) Alexandr Dolgopolov	6	4	7^{7}
WC	(United States) Reilly Opelka	4	6	6^{2}
WC	(United States) Mackenzie McDonald	6	6
8	(Uzbekistan) Denis Istomin	4	2

Qualifying competition
5	(Ukraine) Alexandr Dolgopolov	6	6
WC	(United States) Mackenzie McDonald	3	4

==== Sixth qualifier ====
First round
6	(Canada) Vasek Pospisil	4	4
(Australia) John-Patrick Smith	6	6
Alt	(United States) Christian Harrison	6	2	6
10	(France) Julien Benneteau	2	6	3

Qualifying competition
(Australia) John-Patrick Smith	2	6	6
Alt	(United States) Christian Harrison	6	3	3

==== Seventh qualifier ====
First round
7	(Tunisia) Malek Jaziri	6	4	2
(United States) Mitchell Krueger	2	6	6
Alt	(Croatia) Nikola Mektić	5	4
11	(Italy) Thomas Fabbiano	7	6

Qualifying competition
(United States) Mitchell Krueger	6	6
11	(Italy) Thomas Fabbiano	0	4
