= Mubaraka Al-Naimi =

Qatari tennis player

- Country (sports): Qatar
- Born: 13 April 2001 (age 24)
- Prize money: $35,590

Singles
- Career record: 0–4

Doubles
- Career record: 0–4
- Highest ranking: No. 1372 (19 February 2024)
- Last updated on: 12 February 2024.

Mubaraka Al-Naimi (born 13 April 2001) is a Qatari professional tennis player. She is currently the Qatari No. 1.

Al-Naimi made her WTA main draw debut at the 2017 Qatar Total Open in the doubles draw partnering Fatma Al-Nabhani.

In 2020, Al-Naimi won the Qatar Rail Tennis Open Tournament. From 2015–19, she played on the Junior ITF Women's Circuit.
