= 2017 Rogers Cup – Women's singles =

Women's singles
- 2017 Rogers Cup

Final
- Champion: (Ukraine) Elina Svitolina
- Runner-up: (Denmark) Caroline Wozniacki
- Score: 6–4, 6–0

Details
- Draw: 56 (12 Q / 3 WC )
- Seeds: 16

Events
Singles	men	women
Doubles	men	women
← 2016 ·	Rogers Cup	· 2018 →

Elina Svitolina defeated Caroline Wozniacki in the final, 6–4, 6–0 to win the women's singles tennis title at the 2017 Canadian Open. It was her third consecutive Premier 5 title, making her the first woman to win the first three Premier 5 tournaments in a season, as well as the first to win three consecutive Premier 5 tournaments since Wozniacki won Montreal and Tokyo in 2010 and Dubai in 2011. This was also Wozniacki's sixth consecutive loss in a final in 2017, making her the first to lose that many finals in a row in one season, as well as the first woman to lose six finals in a single season since Maria Sharapova in 2012.

Simona Halep was the defending champion, but lost in the semifinals to Svitolina.

== Seeds ==
The top eight seeds received a bye into the second round.

1. (Czech Republic) Karolína Plíšková (quarterfinals)
2. (Romania) Simona Halep (semifinals)
3. (Germany) Angelique Kerber (third round)
4. (Spain) Garbiñe Muguruza (quarterfinals)
5. (Ukraine) Elina Svitolina (champion)
6. (Denmark) Caroline Wozniacki (final)
7. (United Kingdom) Johanna Konta (second round)
8. (Russia) Svetlana Kuznetsova (second round)

9. (United States) Venus Williams (third round)
10. (Poland) Agnieszka Radwańska (third round)
11. (Slovakia) Dominika Cibulková (second round)
12. (Latvia) Jeļena Ostapenko (first round)
13. (France) Kristina Mladenovic (first round)
14. (Czech Republic) Petra Kvitová (second round)
15. (Latvia) Anastasija Sevastova (second round)
16. (Russia) Elena Vesnina (second round)

Click on the seed number of a player to go to their draw section.

== Draw ==
=== Key ===
- Q = Qualifier
- WC = Wild card
- LL = Lucky loser
- Alt = Alternate
- ITF = ITF entry
- PR = Protected ranking
- SR = Special ranking
- SE = Special exempt
- JE = Junior exempt
- JR = Junior Accelerator Programme entrant
- CO = College Accelerator Programme entrant
- NG = Next Gen Accelerator Program entrant
- w/o = Walkover
- r = Retired
- d = Defaulted

=== Finals ===
Quarterfinals
1	(Czech Republic) Karolína Plíšková	5	7^{7}	4
6	(Denmark) Caroline Wozniacki	7	6^{3}	6
PR	(United States) Sloane Stephens	6	1	7
(Czech Republic) Lucie Šafářová	2	6	5
5	(Ukraine) Elina Svitolina	4	6	6
4	(Spain) Garbiñe Muguruza	6	4	3
(France) Caroline Garcia	4	2
2	(Romania) Simona Halep	6	6

Semifinals
6	(Denmark) Caroline Wozniacki	6	6
PR	(United States) Sloane Stephens	2	3
5	(Ukraine) Elina Svitolina	6	6
2	(Romania) Simona Halep	1	1

Final
6	(Denmark) Caroline Wozniacki	4	0
5	(Ukraine) Elina Svitolina	6	6

=== Top half ===
==== Section 1 ====
First round
(Russia) A Pavlyuchenkova	6	6
(France) A Cornet	0	1
Q	(Japan) N Osaka	6	4
Q	(United Kingdom) H Watson	1	1^{r}
(United States) L Davis	1	6	3
15	(Latvia) A Sevastova	6	4	6
10	(Poland) A Radwańska	6	6
(United States) C Vandeweghe	3	2
(Hungary) T Babos	6	6
WC	(Canada) B Andreescu	4	1
Q	(United States) S Vickery	1	6^{3}
Q	(Russia) E Alexandrova	6	7^{7}

Second round
1	(Czech Republic) Ka Plíšková	6	6
(Russia) A Pavlyuchenkova	3	3
Q	(Japan) N Osaka	6	6
15	(Latvia) A Sevastova	3	4
10	(Poland) A Radwańska	6	6
(Hungary) T Babos	0	1
Q	(Russia) E Alexandrova	3	0
6	(Denmark) C Wozniacki	6	6

Third round
1	(Czech Republic) Ka Plíšková	6	6^{4}	1
Q	(Japan) N Osaka	2	7^{7}	0^{r}
10	(Poland) A Radwańska	3	1
6	(Denmark) C Wozniacki	6	6

Quarterfinals
1	(Czech Republic) Ka Plíšková	5	7^{7}	4
6	(Denmark) C Wozniacki	7	6^{3}	6

==== Section 2 ====
First round
Q	(Croatia) D Vekić	6	6
WC	(Canada) E Bouchard	3	4
(Kazakhstan) Y Putintseva	7^{7}	0	4
PR	(United States) S Stephens	6^{4}	6	6
(Spain) C Suárez Navarro	1	6^{5}
14	(Czech Republic) P Kvitová	6	7^{7}
11	(Slovakia) D Cibulková	7^{7}	6
(Ukraine) L Tsurenko	6^{3}	4
(Czech Republic) L Šafářová	6	6
WC	(Canada) F Abanda	4	4
(China) S Peng	1	3
(Russia) E Makarova	6	6

Second round
3	(Germany) A Kerber	6	7^{7}
Q	(Croatia) D Vekić	4	6^{5}
PR	(United States) S Stephens	7^{7}	3	6
14	(Czech Republic) P Kvitová	6^{4}	6	2
11	(Slovakia) D Cibulková	2	4
(Czech Republic) L Šafářová	6	6
(Russia) E Makarova	5	7^{7}	6
7	(United Kingdom) J Konta	7	6^{4}	3

Third round
3	(Germany) A Kerber	2	2
PR	(United States) S Stephens	6	6
(Czech Republic) L Šafářová	6	6^{3}	6
(Russia) E Makarova	3	7^{7}	2

Quarterfinals
PR	(United States) S Stephens	6	1	7
(Czech Republic) L Šafářová	2	6	5

=== Bottom half ===
==== Section 3 ====
First round
(Russia) D Kasatkina	7^{7}	7^{7}
(Italy) R Vinci	6^{3}	6^{1}
(Czech Republic) K Siniaková	4	6	6
Q	(Colombia) M Duque Mariño	6	0	4
Q	(Romania) I-C Begu	1	6	3
9	(United States) V Williams	6	3	6
16	(Russia) E Vesnina	6	6
(United States) A Riske	3	3
(France) O Dodin	0^{r}
Q	(Australia) A Barty	5
(Croatia) A Konjuh	2	0^{r}
Q	(Belgium) K Flipkens	6	0

Second round
5	(Ukraine) E Svitolina	7^{7}	6
(Russia) D Kasatkina	6^{4}	4
(Czech Republic) K Siniaková	5	5
9	(United States) V Williams	7	7
16	(Russia) E Vesnina	3	7	4
Q	(Australia) A Barty	6	5	6
Q	(Belgium) K Flipkens	5	2
4	(Spain) G Muguruza	7	6

Third round
5	(Ukraine) E Svitolina	6	6
9	(United States) V Williams	2	1
Q	(Australia) A Barty	0	6	2
4	(Spain) G Muguruza	6	3	6

Quarterfinals
5	(Ukraine) E Svitolina	4	6	6
4	(Spain) G Muguruza	6	4	3

==== Section 4 ====
First round
(Germany) J Görges	6	3	2
(United States) C Bellis	4	6	6
Q	(Romania) S Cîrstea	2	7^{7}	4
(France) C Garcia	6	6^{4}	6
Q	(United States) V Lepchenko	1	7^{7}	7^{7}
12	(Latvia) J Ostapenko	6	6^{2}	6^{5}
13	(France) K Mladenovic	2	3
(Czech Republic) B Strýcová	6	6
(Australia) D Gavrilova	6	6
Q	(Spain) L Arruabarrena	3	3
(Croatia) M Lučić-Baroni	5	0
LL	(Slovakia) M Rybáriková	7	6

Second round
8	(Russia) S Kuznetsova	4	5
(United States) C Bellis	6	7
(France) C Garcia	6	6
Q	(United States) V Lepchenko	1	4
(Czech Republic) B Strýcová	4	7^{7}	6
(Australia) D Gavrilova	6	6^{5}	3
LL	(Slovakia) M Rybáriková	3	4
2	(Romania) S Halep	6	6

Third round
(United States) C Bellis	4	2
(France) C Garcia	6	6
(Czech Republic) B Strýcová	1	0
2	(Romania) S Halep	6	6

Quarterfinals
(France) C Garcia	4	2
2	(Romania) S Halep	6	6

== Qualifying ==
=== Seeds ===
1. (Slovakia) Magdaléna Rybáriková (qualifying competition, lucky loser)
2. (Romania) Irina-Camelia Begu (qualified)
3. (Japan) Naomi Osaka (qualified)
4. (Germany) Mona Barthel (first round)
5. (Croatia) Donna Vekić (qualified)
6. (Sweden) Johanna Larsson (first round)
7. (Romania) Sorana Cîrstea (qualified)
8. (Australia) Ashleigh Barty (qualified)
9. (Romania) Monica Niculescu (withdrew due to change of schedule)
10. (United States) Christina McHale (qualifying competition)
11. (Germany) Tatjana Maria (qualifying competition)
12. (Spain) Lara Arruabarrena (qualified)
13. (Russia) Natalia Vikhlyantseva (first round)
14. (United States) Varvara Lepchenko (qualified)
15. (Japan) Nao Hibino (first round)
16. (United States) Madison Brengle (qualifying competition)
17. (United Kingdom) Heather Watson (qualified)
18. (Japan) Risa Ozaki (qualifying competition)
19. (United States) Jennifer Brady (first round)
20. (Japan) Misaki Doi (qualifying competition)
21. (Italy) Camila Giorgi (qualifying competition)
22. (Belgium) Kirsten Flipkens (qualified)
23. (Paraguay) Verónica Cepede Royg (first round)
24. (Poland) Magda Linette (first round)
25. (Russia) Ekaterina Alexandrova (qualified)

=== Qualifiers ===
1. (United States) Varvara Lepchenko
2. (Romania) Irina-Camelia Begu
3. (Japan) Naomi Osaka
4. (Colombia) Mariana Duque Mariño
5. (Croatia) Donna Vekić
6. (United States) Sachia Vickery
7. (Romania) Sorana Cîrstea
8. (Australia) Ashleigh Barty
9. (Russia) Ekaterina Alexandrova
10. (Belgium) Kirsten Flipkens
11. (United Kingdom) Heather Watson
12. (Spain) Lara Arruabarrena

=== Lucky loser ===
1. (Slovakia) Magdaléna Rybáriková

=== Qualifying draw ===
==== First qualifier ====
First round
1	(Slovakia) Magdaléna Rybáriková	6	5	7^{8}
(Japan) Kurumi Nara	2	7	6^{6}
WC	(Canada) Gabriela Dabrowski	3	3
14	(United States) Varvara Lepchenko	6	6

Qualifying competition
1	(Slovakia) Magdaléna Rybáriková	5	0
14	(United States) Varvara Lepchenko	7	6

==== Second qualifier ====
First round
2	(Romania) Irina-Camelia Begu	6	6
(Japan) Miyu Kato	3	4
(Australia) Lizette Cabrera	6	4	7^{7}
19	(United States) Jennifer Brady	3	6	6^{2}

Qualifying competition
2	(Romania) Irina-Camelia Begu	6	6
(Australia) Lizette Cabrera	4	2

==== Third qualifier ====
First round
3	(Japan) Naomi Osaka	6	6
(United States) Jamie Loeb	3	3
(Czech Republic) Barbora Krejčíková	4	7^{7}	6
24	(Poland) Magda Linette	6	6^{3}	4

Qualifying competition
3	(Japan) Naomi Osaka	1	7^{7}	6
(Czech Republic) Barbora Krejčíková	6	6^{4}	0

==== Fourth qualifier ====
First round
4	(Germany) Mona Barthel	6	4	4
(Colombia) Mariana Duque Mariño	1	6	6
(Japan) Eri Hozumi	6^{4}	6^{4}
20	(Japan) Misaki Doi	7^{7}	7^{7}

Qualifying competition
(Colombia) Mariana Duque Mariño	3	6	6
20	(Japan) Misaki Doi	6	3	4

==== Fifth qualifier ====
First round
5	(Croatia) Donna Vekić	5	6	6
WC	(Canada) Carson Branstine	7	2	3
(Romania) Patricia Maria Țig	6	6
13	(Russia) Natalia Vikhlyantseva	3	1

Qualifying competition
5	(Croatia) Donna Vekić	6	6
(Romania) Patricia Maria Țig	4	2

==== Sixth qualifier ====
First round
6	(Sweden) Johanna Larsson	7	2	4
(Belgium) Alison Van Uytvanck	5	6	6
(United States) Sachia Vickery	7	6
15	(Japan) Nao Hibino	5	0

Qualifying competition
(Belgium) Alison Van Uytvanck	3	4
(United States) Sachia Vickery	6	6

==== Seventh qualifier ====
First round
7	(Romania) Sorana Cîrstea	6	6
WC	(Canada) Aleksandra Wozniak	4	1
(United States) Julia Boserup	1	0
21	(Italy) Camila Giorgi	6	6

Qualifying competition
7	(Romania) Sorana Cîrstea	6	6
21	(Italy) Camila Giorgi	4	4

==== Eighth qualifier ====
First round
8	(Australia) Ashleigh Barty	6	6
WC	(Canada) Katherine Sebov	4	3
(United States) Asia Muhammad	3	3
16	(United States) Madison Brengle	6	6

Qualifying competition
8	(Australia) Ashleigh Barty	1	6	6
16	(United States) Madison Brengle	6	2	2

==== Ninth qualifier ====
First round
25	(Russia) Ekaterina Alexandrova	6	6
(Romania) Ana Bogdan	1	2
WC	(Canada) Carol Zhao	7^{7}	2	6
23	(Paraguay) Verónica Cepede Royg	6^{5}	6	1

Qualifying competition
25	(Russia) Ekaterina Alexandrova	6	6
WC	(Canada) Carol Zhao	2	3

==== Tenth qualifier ====
First round
10	(United States) Christina McHale	6	6
WC	(Canada) Isabelle Boulais	0	1
WC	(Canada) Layne Sleeth	2	2
22	(Belgium) Kirsten Flipkens	6	6

Qualifying competition
10	(United States) Christina McHale	1	7	3
22	(Belgium) Kirsten Flipkens	6	5	6

==== Eleventh qualifier ====
First round
11	(Germany) Tatjana Maria	6	7
(Croatia) Jana Fett	2	5
(Slovakia) Jana Čepelová	6	6^{0}	6^{6}
17	(United Kingdom) Heather Watson	1	7^{7}	7^{8}

Qualifying competition
11	(Germany) Tatjana Maria	3	6^{8}
17	(United Kingdom) Heather Watson	6	7^{10}

==== Twelfth qualifier ====
First round
12	(Spain) Lara Arruabarrena	6	6
(Australia) Arina Rodionova	4	2
WC	(Canada) Charlotte Robillard-Millette	3	3
18	(Japan) Risa Ozaki	6	6

Qualifying competition
12	(Spain) Lara Arruabarrena	7	6
18	(Japan) Risa Ozaki	5	4
