= 2017 Porsche Tennis Grand Prix =

- Date: 24–30 April
- Edition: 40th
- Category: Premier
- Draw: 28S / 16D
- Prize money: $710,900
- Surface: Clay (indoor)
- Location: Stuttgart, Germany
- Venue: Porsche-Arena

Champions

Singles
- (Germany) Laura Siegemund

Doubles
- (United States) Raquel Atawo / (Latvia) Jeļena Ostapenko
- Porsche Tennis Grand Prix

The 2017 Porsche Tennis Grand Prix was a women's tennis tournament played on indoor clay courts. It was the 40th edition of the Porsche Tennis Grand Prix, and part of the Premier tournaments of the 2017 WTA Tour. It took place at the Porsche Arena in Stuttgart, Germany, from 24 to 30 April 2017.

Besides the prize money, the singles champion won a Porsche 911 Carrera GTS Cabriolet sports car.

Maria Sharapova made her return to competitive tennis at the tournament, following her 15-month suspension for taking the banned substance meldonium at the 2016 Australian Open.

== Finals ==
=== Singles ===
- (Germany) Laura Siegemund defeated (France) Kristina Mladenovic, 6–1, 2–6, 7–6^{(7–5)}

=== Doubles ===
- (United States) Raquel Atawo / (Latvia) Jeļena Ostapenko defeated (United States) Abigail Spears / (Slovenia) Katarina Srebotnik, 6-4, 6–4

== Points and prize money ==
=== Point distribution ===
| Event | W | F | SF | QF | Round of 16 | Round of 32 | Q | Q3 | Q2 | Q1 |
| Singles | 470 | 305 | 185 | 100 | 55 | 1 | 25 | 18 | 13 | 1 |
| Doubles | 470 | 305 | 185 | 100 | 1 | —N/a | —N/a | —N/a | —N/a | —N/a |

=== Prize money ===
| Event | W | F | SF | QF | Round of 16 | Round of 32 | Q3 | Q2 | Q1 |
| Singles | €107,036 | €57,157 | €30,536 | €16,411 | €8,798 | €5,585 | €2,508 | €1,333 | €742 |
| Doubles * | €33,482 | €17,885 | €9,774 | €4,974 | €2,702 | —N/a | —N/a | —N/a | —N/a |

_{* per team}

== Singles main draw entrants ==
=== Seeds ===
| Country | | Rank^{1} | Seed |
|---|---|---|---|
| GER | Angelique Kerber | 1 | 1 |
| CZE | Karolína Plíšková | 3 | 2 |
| ~~SVK~~ | ~~Dominika Cibulková~~ | ~~4~~ | ~~3~~ |
| ROU | Simona Halep | 5 | 4 |
| ESP | Garbiñe Muguruza | 6 | 5 |
| GBR | Johanna Konta | 7 | 6 |
| POL | Agnieszka Radwańska | 8 | 7 |
| RUS | Svetlana Kuznetsova | 9 | 8 |

- ^{1} Rankings are as of April 17, 2017.

=== Other entrants ===
The following players received wildcards into the main draw:

- (United Kingdom) Johanna Konta
- (Russia) Maria Sharapova
- (Germany) Laura Siegemund

The following players received entry from the qualifying draw:

- (Japan) Naomi Osaka
- (Latvia) Jeļena Ostapenko
- (Germany) Tamara Korpatsch
- (Estonia) Anett Kontaveit

The following player received entry as a lucky loser:

- (United States) Jennifer Brady

=== Withdrawals ===
Before the tournament

- (Slovakia) Dominika Cibulková →replaced by (United States) Jennifer Brady
- (France) Caroline Garcia →replaced by (China) Zhang Shuai
- (United States) Madison Keys →replaced by (Russia) Daria Kasatkina

== Doubles main draw entrants ==
=== Seeds ===
| Country | Player | Country | Player | Rank^{1} | Seed |
|---|---|---|---|---|---|
| USA | Abigail Spears | SLO | Katarina Srebotnik | 42 | 1 |
| SLO | Andreja Klepač | ESP | María José Martínez Sánchez | 60 | 2 |
| USA | Raquel Atawo | LAT | Jeļena Ostapenko | 69 | 3 |
| GER | Anna-Lena Grönefeld | CZE | Květa Peschke | 69 | 4 |

- ^{1} Rankings are as of April 17, 2017.

=== Other entrants ===
The following pair received a wildcard into the main draw:

- (Germany) Annika Beck / (Germany) Anna Zaja
