= 2017 Rogers Cup =

- Date: August 7–13
- Edition: 128th (men) / 116th (women)
- Category: ATP World Tour Masters 1000 (men); WTA Premier 5 (women)
- Surface: Hard / outdoor
- Location: Montréal, Canada (men); Toronto, Canada (women)

Champions

Men's singles
- (Germany) Alexander Zverev

Women's singles
- (Ukraine) Elina Svitolina

Men's doubles
- (France) Pierre-Hugues Herbert / (France) Nicolas Mahut

Women's doubles
- (Russia) Ekaterina Makarova / (Russia) Elena Vesnina
- Canadian Open

The 2017 Rogers Cup presented by National Bank was a tennis tournament played on outdoor hard courts. It was the 128th edition (for the men) and the 125th (for the women) of the Canadian Open. The tournament was part of the ATP World Tour Masters 1000 of the 2017 ATP World Tour, and of the WTA Premier 5 tournaments of the 2017 WTA Tour, and is also a 2017 US Open Series event. The women's event (also called the Toronto Open) was held at the Aviva Centre in Toronto, from August 7 to August 13 and the men's event was held at the Uniprix Stadium in Montreal, from August 7 to August 13.

== Points and prize money ==
=== Point distribution ===
Event	W	F	SF	QF	Round of 16	Round of 32	Round of 64	Q	Q2	Q1
Men's singles	1000	600	360	180	90	45	10	25	16	0
Men's doubles	1000	600	360	180	90	0	—N/a	—N/a	—N/a	—N/a
Women's singles	900	585	350	190	105	60	1	30	20	1
Women's doubles	900	585	350	190	105	5	—N/a	—N/a	—N/a	—N/a

=== Prize money ===
Event	W	F	SF	QF	Round of 16	Round of 32	Round of 64	Q2	Q1
Men's singles	$894,585	$438,635	$220,760	$112,255	$58,295	$30,730	$16,595	$3,820	$1,950
Women's singles	$501,975	$243,920	$122,190	$58,185	$28,030	$14,360	$7,745	$3,150	$1,905
Men's doubles	$277,030	$135,630	$68,030	$34,920	$18,050	$9,520	—N/a	—N/a	—N/a
Women's doubles	$143,600	$72,534	$35,910	$18,075	$9,170	$4,530	—N/a	—N/a	—N/a

== ATP singles main-draw entrants ==
=== Seeds ===
The following are the seeded players. Seedings are based on ATP rankings as of July 31, 2017. Rankings and points before are as of August 7, 2017.

Because the tournament takes place two weeks later than in 2016, the points defended from last year was not superseded within a 52-week run, the results during the 52-week period were from 2016 Los Cabos Open.

Seed	Rank	Player	Points before	Points defending	Points won	Points after	Status
1	2	(Spain) Rafael Nadal	7,465	0	90	7,555	Third round lost to (Canada) Denis Shapovalov [WC]
2	3	(Switzerland) Roger Federer	6,545	0	600	7,145	Runner-up, lost to (Germany) Alexander Zverev [4]
3	7	(Austria) Dominic Thiem	4,065	(45)	10	4,030	Second round lost to (Argentina) Diego Schwartzman
4	8	(Germany) Alexander Zverev	3,560	(90)	1,000	4,470	Champion, defeated (Switzerland) Roger Federer [2]
5	9	(Japan) Kei Nishikori	3,320	(45)	10	3,285	Second round lost to (France) Gaël Monfils
6	10	(Canada) Milos Raonic	3,220	0	10	3,230	Second round lost to (France) Adrian Mannarino
7	11	(Bulgaria) Grigor Dimitrov	3,070	(90)	90	3,070	Third round lost to (Netherlands) Robin Haase
8	12	(France) Jo-Wilfried Tsonga	2,805	(45)^{†}	10	2,770	Second round lost to (United States) Sam Querrey
9	13	(Belgium) David Goffin	2,560	(45)	45	2,560	Second round lost to (South Korea) Chung Hyeon
~~10~~	~~14~~	~~(Czech Republic) Tomáš Berdych~~	2,480	(90)	0	2,390	Withdrew due to rib injury
11	15	(Spain) Pablo Carreño Busta	2,350	90	45	2,305	Second round lost to (South Africa) Kevin Anderson
12	16	(Spain) Roberto Bautista Agut	2,335	(90)^{†}	180	2,425	Quarterfinals lost to (Switzerland) Roger Federer [2]
13	18	(France) Lucas Pouille	2,255	(45)	10	2,220	First round lost to (United States) Jared Donaldson
14	19	(United States) John Isner	2,145	(45)	10	2,110	First round lost to (Argentina) Juan Martín del Potro
15	17	(United States) Jack Sock	2,335	(45)	45	2,335	Third round lost to (Spain) David Ferrer
16	24	(Australia) Nick Kyrgios	1,680	0	90	1,770	Third round lost to (Germany) Alexander Zverev [4]

† The player used an exemption to skip the tournament in 2016. Accordingly, points for his 18th best result are deducted instead.

=== Other entrants ===
The following players received wild cards into the main singles draw:

- (Canada) Peter Polansky
- (Canada) Vasek Pospisil
- (Canada) Brayden Schnur
- (Canada) Denis Shapovalov

The following players received entry from the singles qualifying draw:

- (Italy) Thomas Fabbiano
- (Slovakia) Norbert Gombos
- (France) Pierre-Hugues Herbert
- (France) Vincent Millot
- (United States) Reilly Opelka
- (Israel) Dudi Sela
- (United States) Tim Smyczek

The following players received entry as lucky losers:

- (United States) Ernesto Escobedo
- (Russia) Mikhail Youzhny

=== Withdrawals ===
Before the tournament

- (Czech Republic) Tomáš Berdych (rib) →replaced by (United States) Ernesto Escobedo
- (Croatia) Marin Čilić (adductor injury) →replaced by (Russia) Daniil Medvedev
- (Uruguay) Pablo Cuevas →replaced by (France) Adrian Mannarino
- (Serbia) Novak Djokovic (elbow injury) →replaced by (South Africa) Kevin Anderson
- (Italy) Fabio Fognini →replaced by (South Korea) Chung Hyeon
- (Croatia) Ivo Karlović →replaced by (United States) Frances Tiafoe
- (Slovakia) Martin Kližan →replaced by (United States) Donald Young
- (Luxembourg) Gilles Müller →replaced by (Russia) Mikhail Youzhny
- (United Kingdom) Andy Murray (hip injury) →replaced by (Japan) Yūichi Sugita
- (France) Gilles Simon →replaced by (Georgia (country)) Nikoloz Basilashvili
- (Spain) Fernando Verdasco →replaced by (United States) Jared Donaldson
- (Switzerland) Stan Wawrinka (knee injury) →replaced by (United Kingdom) Kyle Edmund

== ATP doubles main-draw entrants ==
=== Seeds ===
Country	Player	Country	Player	Rank^{1}	Seed
FIN	Henri Kontinen	AUS	John Peers	5	1
POL	Łukasz Kubot	BRA	Marcelo Melo	5	2
GBR	Jamie Murray	BRA	Bruno Soares	11	3
USA	Bob Bryan	USA	Mike Bryan	14	4
FRA	Pierre-Hugues Herbert	FRA	Nicolas Mahut	22	5
RSA	Raven Klaasen	USA	Rajeev Ram	27	6
IND	Rohan Bopanna	CRO	Ivan Dodig	31	7
AUT	Oliver Marach	CRO	Mate Pavić	34	8

- Rankings are as of July 31, 2017

=== Other entrants ===
The following pairs received wildcards into the doubles main draw:

- (Canada) Frank Dancevic / (Canada) Adil Shamasdin
- (Canada) Daniel Nestor / (Canada) Vasek Pospisil

The following pair received entry as alternates:

- (France) Gaël Monfils / (France) Benoît Paire

=== Withdrawals ===
Before the tournament

- (United States) Steve Johnson

During the tournament

- (Spain) David Ferrer

== WTA singles main-draw entrants ==
=== Seeds ===
Country	Player	Rank^{1}	Seed
CZE	Karolína Plíšková	1	1
ROU	Simona Halep	2	2
GER	Angelique Kerber	3	3
ESP	Garbiñe Muguruza	4	4
UKR	Elina Svitolina	5	5
DEN	Caroline Wozniacki	6	6
GBR	Johanna Konta	7	7
RUS	Svetlana Kuznetsova	8	8
USA	Venus Williams	9	9
POL	Agnieszka Radwańska	10	10
SVK	Dominika Cibulková	11	11
LAT	Jeļena Ostapenko	12	12
FRA	Kristina Mladenovic	13	13
CZE	Petra Kvitová	14	14
LAT	Anastasija Sevastova	16	15
RUS	Elena Vesnina	17	16

- ^{1} Rankings are as of July 31, 2017

=== Other entrants ===
The following players received wild cards into the main singles draw:

- (Canada) Françoise Abanda
- (Canada) Bianca Andreescu
- (Canada) Eugenie Bouchard

The following player received entry using a protected ranking:

- (United States) Sloane Stephens

The following players received entry from the singles qualifying draw:

- (Russia) Ekaterina Alexandrova
- (Spain) Lara Arruabarrena
- (Australia) Ashleigh Barty
- (Romania) Irina-Camelia Begu
- (Romania) Sorana Cîrstea
- (Colombia) Mariana Duque Mariño
- (Belgium) Kirsten Flipkens
- (United States) Varvara Lepchenko
- (Japan) Naomi Osaka
- (Croatia) Donna Vekić
- (United States) Sachia Vickery
- (United Kingdom) Heather Watson

The following player received entry as a lucky loser:

- (Slovakia) Magdaléna Rybáriková

=== Withdrawals ===
Before the tournament

- (United States) Madison Keys →replaced by (Slovakia) Magdaléna Rybáriková
- (Czech Republic) Kristýna Plíšková →replaced by (Germany) Julia Görges
- (Australia) Samantha Stosur →replaced by (United States) Alison Riske

=== Retirements ===
- (Japan) Naomi Osaka

== WTA doubles main-draw entrants ==
=== Seeds ===
Country	Player	Country	Player	Rank^{1}	Seed
RUS	Ekaterina Makarova	RUS	Elena Vesnina	6	1
TPE	Chan Yung-jan	SUI	Martina Hingis	11	2
CZE	Lucie Šafářová	CZE	Barbora Strýcová	12	3
IND	Sania Mirza	CHN	Peng Shuai	19	4
HUN	Tímea Babos	CZE	Andrea Hlaváčková	27	5
CZE	Lucie Hradecká	CZE	Kateřina Siniaková	31	6
AUS	Ashleigh Barty	AUS	Casey Dellacqua	32	7
GER	Anna-Lena Grönefeld	CZE	Květa Peschke	48	8

- Rankings are as of July 31, 2017

=== Other entrants ===
The following pairs received wildcards into the doubles main draw:

- (Canada) Bianca Andreescu / (Canada) Carson Branstine
- (Canada) Eugenie Bouchard / (Czech Republic) Karolína Plíšková
- (Canada) Charlotte Robillard-Millette / (Canada) Carol Zhao

The following pair received entry as alternates:

- (United States) Lauren Davis / (United States) Alison Riske

=== Withdrawals ===
Before the tournament

- (Croatia) Ana Konjuh

During the tournament

- (China) Peng Shuai

== Finals ==
=== Men's singles ===
- (Germany) Alexander Zverev defeated (Switzerland) Roger Federer, 6–3, 6–4

=== Women's singles ===
- (Ukraine) Elina Svitolina defeated (Denmark) Caroline Wozniacki, 6–4, 6–0

=== Men's doubles ===
- (France) Pierre-Hugues Herbert / (France) Nicolas Mahut defeated (India) Rohan Bopanna / (Croatia) Ivan Dodig, 6–4, 3–6, [10–6]

=== Women's doubles ===
- (Russia) Ekaterina Makarova / (Russia) Elena Vesnina defeated (Germany) Anna-Lena Grönefeld / (Czech Republic) Květa Peschke, 6–0, 6-4
