= 2017 Aegon Classic Birmingham =

- Date: 19–25 June
- Edition: 36th
- Category: WTA Premier
- Draw: 32S / 16D
- Prize money: $846,000
- Surface: Grass
- Location: Birmingham, United Kingdom
- Venue: Edgbaston Priory Club

Champions

Singles
- (Czech Republic) Petra Kvitová

Doubles
- (Australia) Ashleigh Barty / (Australia) Casey Dellacqua
← 2016 ·	Birmingham Classic	· 2018 →

The 2017 Aegon Classic Birmingham was a women's tennis tournament played on outdoor grass courts. It was the 36th edition of the event, and a Premier tournament on the 2017 WTA Tour. It took place at the Edgbaston Priory Club in Birmingham, United Kingdom from 19 June until 25 June 2017. Petra Kvitová won the singles title.

== Points and prize money ==
=== Point distribution ===
Event	W	F	SF	QF	Round of 16	Round of 32	Q	Q2	Q1
Singles	470	305	185	100	55	1	25 / 18	13	1
Doubles	470	305	185	100	1	—	—	—	—

=== Prize money ===
Event	W	F	SF	QF	Round of 16	Round of 32	Q	Q2	Q1
Singles	$146,200	$77,850	$41,555	$22,310	$11,930	$5,735	$3,400	$1,815	$1,005
Doubles	$45,620	$24,340	$13,310	$6,780	$3,675	—	—	—	—

== Singles main draw entrants ==
=== Seeds ===
Country	Player	Rank^{1}	Seed
~~GER~~	~~Angelique Kerber~~	~~1~~	~~1~~
UKR	Elina Svitolina	5	2
SVK	Dominika Cibulková	6	3
GBR	Johanna Konta	8	4
FRA	Kristina Mladenovic	13	5
ESP	Garbiñe Muguruza	15	6
CZE	Petra Kvitová	17	7
CZE	Barbora Strýcová	20	8
AUS	Daria Gavrilova	24	9

- ^{1} Rankings as of June 12, 2017.

=== Other entrants ===
The following players received wildcards into the main draw:

- (United Kingdom) Naomi Broady
- (Czech Republic) Petra Kvitová
- (United Kingdom) Heather Watson

The following players received entry from the qualifying draw:

- (Italy) Camila Giorgi
- (Chinese Taipei) Hsieh Su-wei
- (Russia) Elizaveta Kulichkova
- (Czech Republic) Markéta Vondroušová

The following player received entry as a lucky loser:

- (Czech Republic) Tereza Smitková

=== Withdrawals ===
Before the tournament

- (Romania) Simona Halep →replaced by (Russia) Natalia Vikhlyantseva
- (Russia) Daria Kasatkina →replaced by (United States) Christina McHale
- (Germany) Angelique Kerber →replaced by (Czech Republic) Tereza Smitková
- (United States) Madison Keys →replaced by (France) Alizé Cornet
- (Croatia) Mirjana Lučić-Baroni →replaced by (Croatia) Donna Vekić
- (Latvia) Jeļena Ostapenko →replaced by (Poland) Magda Linette
- (Czech Republic) Karolína Plíšková →replaced by (Japan) Naomi Osaka
- (Puerto Rico) Monica Puig →replaced by (China) Duan Yingying
- (Poland) Agnieszka Radwańska →replaced by (Japan) Nao Hibino
- (Russia) Elena Vesnina →replaced by (Australia) Ashleigh Barty (Note: Vesnina withdrew in Birmingham due to injury and was initially replaced by Latvian Jeļena Ostapenko. However, when Ostapenko chose to withdraw due to her victory at the French Open, she was now replaced by Australian Ashleigh Barty.)

=== Retirements ===
- (Italy) Camila Giorgi (right thigh injury)
- (Czech Republic) Lucie Šafářová (right thigh injury)
- (United States) Coco Vandeweghe (left foot injury)

== Doubles main draw entrants ==
=== Seeds ===
Country	Player	Country	Player	Rank^{1}	Seed
CZE	Lucie Šafářová	CZE	Barbora Strýcová	12	1
USA	Abigail Spears	SLO	Katarina Srebotnik	38	2
CAN	Gabriela Dabrowski	CHN	Xu Yifan	42	3
AUS	Ashleigh Barty	AUS	Casey Dellacqua	51	4

- ^{1} Rankings as of June 12, 2017.

=== Other entrants ===
The following pair received a wildcard into the doubles main draw:

- (United Kingdom) Naomi Broady / (United Kingdom) Heather Watson

=== Withdrawals ===
During the tournament

- (Czech Republic) Lucie Šafářová (right thigh injury)
- (United States) Abigail Spears (left leg injury)
- (United States) Coco Vandeweghe (left foot injury)

== Finals ==
=== Singles ===
- (Czech Republic) Petra Kvitová defeated (Australia) Ashleigh Barty, 4–6, 6–3, 6–2

=== Doubles ===
- (Australia) Ashleigh Barty / (Australia) Casey Dellacqua defeated (Chinese Taipei) Chan Hao-ching / (China) Zhang Shuai, 6–1, 2–6, [10–8]
