= 2017 Western & Southern Open =

- Date: August 14–20
- Edition: 116th (men) / 89th (women)
- Category: ATP World Tour Masters 1000 (men); WTA Premier 5 (women)
- Surface: Hard
- Location: Mason, Ohio, United States
- Venue: Lindner Family Tennis Center

Champions

Men's singles
- (Bulgaria) Grigor Dimitrov

Women's singles
- (Spain) Garbiñe Muguruza

Men's doubles
- (France) Pierre-Hugues Herbert / (France) Nicolas Mahut

Women's doubles
- (Chinese Taipei) Chan Yung-jan / (Switzerland) Martina Hingis
- Western & Southern Open

The 2017 Western & Southern Open was a men's and women's tennis tournament played on outdoor hard courts from August 14–20, 2017. It was a Masters 1000 tournament on the 2017 ATP World Tour and a WTA Premier 5 tournament on the 2017 WTA Tour. The tournament was one of two headline events in the 2017 US Open Series. The 2017 tournament was the 116th men's edition and the 89th women's edition of the Cincinnati Masters. The tournament was held annually at the Lindner Family Tennis Center in Mason, a northern suburb of Cincinnati, in the United States.

Marin Čilić and Karolína Plíšková were the defending champions in men's and women's singles titles. Čilić withdrew due to an adductor injury before the tournament began, while Plíšková lost in the semifinals to Garbiñe Muguruza.

== Points and prize money ==
=== Point distribution ===
| Event | W | F | SF | QF | Round of 16 | Round of 32 | Round of 64 | Q | Q2 | Q1 |
| Men's singles | 1000 | 600 | 360 | 180 | 90 | 45 | 10 | 25 | 16 | 0 |
| Men's doubles | 1000 | 600 | 360 | 180 | 90 | 0 | —N/a | —N/a | —N/a | —N/a |
| Women's singles | 900 | 585 | 350 | 190 | 105 | 60 | 1 | 30 | 20 | 1 |
| Women's doubles | 900 | 585 | 350 | 190 | 105 | 5 | —N/a | —N/a | —N/a | —N/a |

=== Prize money ===
| Event | W | F | SF | QF | Round of 16 | Round of 32 | Round of 64 | Q2 | Q1 |
| Men's singles | $954,225 | $467,880 | $235,480 | $119,740 | $62,180 | $32,780 | $17,700 | $4,080 | $2,075 |
| Women's singles | $522,450 | $260,970 | $128,330 | $60,105 | $29,100 | $14,965 | $7,850 | $ | $ |
| Men's doubles | $295,500 | $144,670 | $72,570 | $37,250 | $19,250 | $10,160 | —N/a | —N/a | —N/a |
| Women's doubles | $149,635 | $75,575 | $37,278 | $18,830 | $9,545 | $4,715 | —N/a | —N/a | —N/a |

== ATP singles main-draw entrants ==
=== Seeds ===
The following are the seeded players. Seedings are based on ATP rankings as of August 7, 2017. Rankings and points before are as of August 14, 2017.

| Seed | Rank | Player | Points before | Points defending | Points won | Points after | Status |
|---|---|---|---|---|---|---|---|
| 1 | 2 | (Spain) Rafael Nadal | 7,555 | 90 | 180 | 7,645 | Quarterfinals lost to (Australia) Nick Kyrgios |
| ~~2~~ | ~~3~~ | ~~(Switzerland) Roger Federer~~ | 7,145 | 0 | 0 | 7,145 | Withdrew due to back injury |
| 3 | 8 | (Austria) Dominic Thiem | 4,030 | 180 | 180 | 4,030 | Quarterfinals lost to (Spain) David Ferrer |
| 4 | 7 | (Germany) Alexander Zverev | 4,470 | 10 | 10 | 4,470 | Second round lost to (United States) Frances Tiafoe [WC] |
| ~~5~~ | ~~9~~ | ~~(Japan) Kei Nishikori~~ | 3,285 | 90 | 0 | 3,205 | Withdrew due to right wrist injury |
| ~~6~~ | ~~10~~ | ~~(Canada) Milos Raonic~~ | 3,230 | 360 | 0 | 2,870 | Withdrew due to left wrist injury |
| 7 | 11 | (Bulgaria) Grigor Dimitrov | 3,070 | 360 | 1,000 | 3,710 | Champion, defeated (Australia) Nick Kyrgios |
| 8 | 12 | (France) Jo-Wilfried Tsonga | 2,770 | 90 | 10 | 2,690 | Second round lost to (Croatia) Ivo Karlović |
| 9 | 13 | (Belgium) David Goffin | 2,560 | 45 | 10 | 2,525 | First round lost to (Australia) Nick Kyrgios |
| 10 | 15 | (Czech Republic) Tomáš Berdych | 2,390 | 90 | 10 | 2,310 | First round lost to (Argentina) Juan Martín del Potro |
| 11 | 17 | (Spain) Pablo Carreño Busta | 2,305 | 10 | 90 | 2,385 | Third round lost to (Spain) David Ferrer |
| 12 | 14 | (Spain) Roberto Bautista Agut | 2,425 | 10 | 10 | 2,425 | First round lost to (United States) Jared Donaldson [WC] |
| 13 | 16 | (United States) Jack Sock | 2,335 | 0 | 10 | 2,345 | First round lost to (Japan) Yūichi Sugita |
| 14 | 19 | (United States) John Isner | 2,110 | 10 | 360 | 2,460 | Semifinals lost to (Bulgaria) Grigor Dimitrov [7] |
| 15 | 20 | (United States) Sam Querrey | 2,060 | 10 | 45 | 2,095 | Second round lost to (France) Adrian Mannarino |
| 16 | 22 | (Luxembourg) Gilles Müller | 1,885 | 0 | 45 | 1,930 | Second round lost to (Spain) Albert Ramos Viñolas |

=== Other entrants ===
The following players received wild cards into the main singles draw:

- (United States) Jared Donaldson
- (United States) Stefan Kozlov
- (United States) Tommy Paul
- (United States) Frances Tiafoe

The following players received entry from the singles qualifying draw:

- (Ukraine) Alexandr Dolgopolov
- (United States) Christopher Eubanks
- (United States) Mitchell Krueger
- (Germany) Maximilian Marterer
- (Australia) John-Patrick Smith
- (Portugal) João Sousa
- (Russia) Mikhail Youzhny

The following players received entry as lucky losers:

- (Italy) Thomas Fabbiano
- (United States) Christian Harrison
- (India) Ramkumar Ramanathan
- (Serbia) Janko Tipsarević

=== Withdrawals ===
Before the tournament

- (Croatia) Marin Čilić →replaced by (South Korea) Chung Hyeon
- (Uruguay) Pablo Cuevas →replaced by (United Kingdom) Kyle Edmund
- (Serbia) Novak Djokovic (elbow injury) →replaced by (Croatia) Borna Ćorić
- (Switzerland) Roger Federer (back injury) →replaced by (Italy) Thomas Fabbiano
- (United Kingdom) Andy Murray (hip injury) →replaced by (Russia) Daniil Medvedev
- (France) Gaël Monfils →replaced by (India) Ramkumar Ramanathan
- (Japan) Kei Nishikori (right wrist injury) →replaced by (Serbia) Janko Tipsarević
- (France) Lucas Pouille →replaced by (Georgia (country)) Nikoloz Basilashvili
- (Canada) Milos Raonic (left wrist injury) →replaced by (United States) Christian Harrison
- (France) Gilles Simon →replaced by (Czech Republic) Jiří Veselý
- (Switzerland) Stan Wawrinka (knee injury) →replaced by (France) Benoît Paire

== ATP doubles main-draw entrants ==
=== Seeds ===
| Country | Player | Country | Player | Rank^{1} | Seed |
|---|---|---|---|---|---|
| FIN | Henri Kontinen | AUS | John Peers | 5 | 1 |
| POL | Łukasz Kubot | BRA | Marcelo Melo | 5 | 2 |
| GBR | Jamie Murray | BRA | Bruno Soares | 11 | 3 |
| USA | Bob Bryan | USA | Mike Bryan | 14 | 4 |
| FRA | Pierre-Hugues Herbert | FRA | Nicolas Mahut | 22 | 5 |
| RSA | Raven Klaasen | USA | Rajeev Ram | 27 | 6 |
| IND | Rohan Bopanna | CRO | Ivan Dodig | 31 | 7 |
| AUT | Oliver Marach | CRO | Mate Pavić | 34 | 8 |

- Rankings are as of August 7, 2017

=== Other entrants ===
The following pairs received wildcards into the doubles main draw:

- (United States) Jared Donaldson / (United States) Stefan Kozlov
- (United States) Jack Sock / (United States) Jackson Withrow

=== Withdrawals ===
During the tournament

- (Spain) Roberto Bautista Agut

== WTA singles main-draw entrants ==
=== Seeds ===
| Country | Player | Ranking | Seeds |
|---|---|---|---|
| CZE | Karolína Plíšková | 1 | 1 |
| ROU | Simona Halep | 2 | 2 |
| GER | Angelique Kerber | 3 | 3 |
| ESP | Garbiñe Muguruza | 4 | 4 |
| UKR | Elina Svitolina | 5 | 5 |
| DEN | Caroline Wozniacki | 6 | 6 |
| GBR | Johanna Konta | 7 | 7 |
| RUS | Svetlana Kuznetsova | 8 | 8 |
| USA | Venus Williams | 9 | 9 |
| POL | Agnieszka Radwańska | 10 | 10 |
| SVK | Dominika Cibulková | 11 | 11 |
| LAT | Jeļena Ostapenko | 12 | 12 |
| FRA | Kristina Mladenovic | 13 | 13 |
| CZE | Petra Kvitová | 14 | 14 |
| LAT | Anastasija Sevastova | 16 | 15 |
| USA | Madison Keys | 17 | 16 |

- Rankings are as of August 7, 2017

=== Other entrants ===
The following players received wild cards into the main singles draw:

- (France) Océane Dodin
- (Russia) ~~Maria Sharapova~~
- (United States) Sloane Stephens

The following players received entry from the singles qualifying draw:

- (Canada) Françoise Abanda
- (Australia) Ashleigh Barty
- (Paraguay) Verónica Cepede Royg
- (Italy) Camila Giorgi
- (Brazil) Beatriz Haddad Maia
- (Serbia) Aleksandra Krunić
- (United States) Varvara Lepchenko
- (Poland) Magda Linette
- (Puerto Rico) Monica Puig
- (Belarus) Aliaksandra Sasnovich
- (United States) Taylor Townsend
- (Croatia) Donna Vekić

The following player received entry as a lucky loser:

- (Russia) Natalia Vikhlyantseva

=== Withdrawals ===
Before the tournament

- (Russia) Maria Sharapova →replaced by (Russia) Natalia Vikhlyantseva
- (Australia) Samantha Stosur →replaced by (Germany) Julia Görges

== WTA doubles main-draw entrants ==
=== Seeds ===
| Country | Player | Country | Player | Rank^{1} | Seed |
|---|---|---|---|---|---|
| ~~RUS~~ | ~~Ekaterina Makarova~~ | ~~RUS~~ | ~~Elena Vesnina~~ | ~~7~~ | ~~1~~ |
| TPE | Chan Yung-jan | SUI | Martina Hingis | 11 | 2 |
| CZE | Lucie Šafářová | CZE | Barbora Strýcová | 12 | 3 |
| IND | Sania Mirza | CHN | Peng Shuai | 19 | 4 |
| HUN | Tímea Babos | CZE | Andrea Hlaváčková | 26 | 5 |
| CZE | Lucie Hradecká | CZE | Kateřina Siniaková | 30 | 6 |
| AUS | Ashleigh Barty | AUS | Casey Dellacqua | 30 | 7 |
| USA | Abigail Spears | SLO | Katarina Srebotnik | 45 | 8 |

- Rankings are as of August 7, 2017

=== Other entrants ===
The following pair received a wildcard into the doubles main draw:

- (United States) Alexa Glatch / (United States) Caty McNally

The following pair received entry as alternates:

- (Ukraine) Lyudmyla Kichenok / (Ukraine) Lesia Tsurenko

=== Withdrawals ===
Before the tournament

- (Russia) Ekaterina Makarova

== Champions ==
=== Men's singles ===
- (Bulgaria) Grigor Dimitrov def. (Australia) Nick Kyrgios, 6–3, 7–5

=== Women's singles ===
- (Spain) Garbiñe Muguruza def. (Romania) Simona Halep, 6–1, 6–0

=== Men's doubles ===
- (France) Pierre-Hugues Herbert / (France) Nicolas Mahut def. (United Kingdom) Jamie Murray / (Brazil) Bruno Soares, 7–6^{(8–6)}, 6–4

=== Women's doubles ===
- (Chinese Taipei) Chan Yung-jan / (Switzerland) Martina Hingis def. (Chinese Taipei) Hsieh Su-wei / (Romania) Monica Niculescu, 4–6, 6–4, [10–7]
