= 2017 Qatar Total Open =

- Date: 13–18 February
- Edition: 15th
- Category: WTA Premier
- Draw: 28S / 16D
- Prize money: $776,000
- Surface: Hard
- Location: Doha, Qatar
- Venue: Khalifa International Tennis and Squash Complex

Champions

Singles
- (Czech Republic) Karolína Plíšková

Doubles
- (United States) Abigail Spears / (Slovenia) Katarina Srebotnik
← 2016 ·	Qatar Open	· 2018 →

The 2017 Qatar Total Open was a professional women's tennis tournament played on hard courts. It was the 15th edition of the event and part of the WTA Premier series of the 2017 WTA Tour. It took place at the International Tennis and Squash complex in Doha, Qatar between 13 and 18 February 2017.

== Points and prize money ==
=== Point distribution ===
Event	W	F	SF	QF	Round of 16	Round of 32	Q	Q3	Q2	Q1
Singles	470	305	185	100	55	1	25	18	13	1
Doubles	470	305	185	100	1	—	—	—	—	—

=== Prize money ===
Event	W	F	SF	QF	Round of 16	Round of 32	Q	Q3	Q2	Q1
Singles	$132,740	$70,880	$36,850	$20,350	$10,915	$6,925	$3,110	$1,650	$920	
Doubles*	$41,520	$22,180	$12,120	$6,165	$3,350	—	—	—	—	—

_{*per team}

== Singles main-draw entrants ==
=== Seeds ===
Country	Player	Rank^{1}	Seed
GER	Angelique Kerber	2	1
CZE	Karolína Plíšková	3	2
SVK	Dominika Cibulková	5	3
POL	Agnieszka Radwańska	6	4
ESP	Garbiñe Muguruza	7	5
RUS	Elena Vesnina	15	6
SUI	Timea Bacsinszky	16	7
CZE	Barbora Strýcová	17	8

- ^{1} Rankings as of February 6, 2017.

=== Other entrants ===
The following players received wildcards into the singles main draw:

- (United Arab Emirates) Fatma Al-Nabhani
- (Turkey) Çağla Büyükakçay

The following players received entry from the qualifying draw:

- (United States) Madison Brengle
- (United States) Lauren Davis
- (Serbia) Jelena Janković
- (United States) Christina McHale

=== Withdrawals ===
Before the tournament

- (United Kingdom) Johanna Konta → replaced by Irina-Camelia Begu
- (Russia) Svetlana Kuznetsova → replaced by Laura Siegemund
- (Spain) Carla Suárez Navarro → replaced by Monica Puig

=== Retirements ===
- (Switzerland) Timea Bacsinszky
- (Kazakhstan) Yulia Putintseva

== Doubles main-draw entrants ==
=== Seeds ===
Country	Player	Country	Player	Rank^{1}	Seed
TPE	Chan Yung-jan	SUI	Martina Hingis	20	1
IND	Sania Mirza	CZE	Barbora Strýcová	21	2
CZE	Andrea Hlaváčková	CHN	Peng Shuai	26	3
USA	Abigail Spears	SLO	Katarina Srebotnik	46	4

- ^{1} Rankings as of February 6, 2017.

=== Other entrants ===
The following pairs received wildcards into the doubles main draw:

- (Oman) Fatma Al-Nabhani / (Qatar) Mubaraka Al-Naimi
- (Chinese Taipei) Chuang Chia-jung / (Serbia) Jelena Janković

The following pair received entry as alternates:

- (United States) Madison Brengle / (United Kingdom) Naomi Broady

=== Withdrawals ===
Before the tournament

- (Hungary) Tímea Babos
- (Switzerland) Timea Bacsinszky

== Champions ==
=== Singles ===
- (Czech Republic) Karolína Plíšková def. (Denmark) Caroline Wozniacki, 6–3, 6–4

=== Doubles ===
- (United States) Abigail Spears / (Slovenia) Katarina Srebotnik def. (Ukraine) Olga Savchuk / (Kazakhstan) Yaroslava Shvedova, 6–3, 7–6^{(9–7)}
