= 2017 Wuhan Open =

Women's tennis tournament

- Date: September 24–30
- Edition: 4th
- Category: WTA Premier 5
- Draw: 56S / 28D
- Prize money: $2,666,000
- Surface: Hard / outdoor
- Location: Wuhan, China
- Venue: Optics Valley Int'l Tennis Center

Champions

Singles
- (France) Caroline Garcia

Doubles
- (Chinese Taipei) Chan Yung-jan / (Switzerland) Martina Hingis
| ← 2016 · | Wuhan Open | · 2018 → |

The 2017 Wuhan Open (also known as the 2017 Dongfeng Motor Wuhan Open for sponsorship reasons) was a women's tennis tournament played on outdoor hard courts between September 24–30, 2017. It was the 4th edition of the Wuhan Open, and part of the WTA Premier 5 tournaments of the 2017 WTA Tour. The tournament was held at the Optics Valley International Tennis Center in Wuhan, China.

== Points and prize money ==
=== Point distribution ===
| Event | W | F | SF | QF | Round of 16 | Round of 32 | Round of 64 | Q | Q2 | Q1 |
| Singles | 900 | 585 | 350 | 190 | 105 | 60 | 1 | 30 | 20 | 1 |
| Doubles | 900 | 585 | 350 | 190 | 105 | 1 | — | — | — | — |

=== Prize money ===
| Event | W | F | SF | QF | Round of 16 | Round of 32 | Round of 64 | Q2 | Q1 |
| Singles | $471,700 | $235,520 | $117,770 | $54,230 | $26,900 | $13,790 | $7,090 | $3,955 | $2,040 |
| Doubles | $135,000 | $68,200 | $33,635 | $16,990 | $8,600 | $4,255 | — | — | — |

== Singles main-draw entrants ==
=== Seeds ===
| Country | Player | Ranking | Seeds |
|---|---|---|---|
| ESP | Garbiñe Muguruza | 1 | 1 |
| ROU | Simona Halep | 2 | 2 |
| CZE | Karolína Plíšková | 4 | 3 |
| DEN | Caroline Wozniacki | 6 | 4 |
| GBR | Johanna Konta | 7 | 5 |
| RUS | Svetlana Kuznetsova | 8 | 6 |
| SVK | Dominika Cibulková | 9 | 7 |
| LAT | Jeļena Ostapenko | 10 | 8 |
| POL | Agnieszka Radwańska | 11 | 9 |
| USA | Madison Keys | 12 | 10 |
| CZE | Petra Kvitová | 13 | 11 |
| GER | Angelique Kerber | 14 | 12 |
| FRA | Kristina Mladenovic | 15 | 13 |
| USA | Sloane Stephens | 17 | 14 |
| LAT | Anastasija Sevastova | 18 | 15 |
| RUS | Elena Vesnina | 19 | 16 |

- Rankings are as of September 18, 2017

=== Other entrants ===
The following players received wild cards into the singles main draw:

- (China) Duan Yingying
- (Switzerland) Jil Teichmann
- (China) Wang Yafan

The following players received entry using a protected ranking into the singles main draw:

- (United States) Sloane Stephens

The following players received entry from the singles qualifying draw:

- (Tunisia) Ons Jabeur
- (United States) Varvara Lepchenko
- (Poland) Magda Linette
- (United States) Christina McHale
- (Romania) Monica Niculescu
- (Germany) Andrea Petkovic
- (Puerto Rico) Monica Puig
- (Greece) Maria Sakkari

=== Withdrawals ===
Before the tournament

- (Switzerland) Timea Bacsinszky → replaced by (China) Wang Qiang
- (Croatia) Mirjana Lučić-Baroni → replaced by (Australia) Ashleigh Barty
- (Czech Republic) Lucie Šafářová → replaced by (Kazakhstan) Yulia Putintseva
- (United States) CoCo Vandeweghe → replaced by (Croatia) Donna Vekić

== Doubles main-draw entrants ==
=== Seeds ===
| Country | Player | Country | Player | Rank^{1} | Seed |
|---|---|---|---|---|---|
| TPE | Chan Yung-jan | SUI | Martina Hingis | 5 | 1 |
| RUS | Ekaterina Makarova | RUS | Elena Vesnina | 10 | 2 |
| IND | Sania Mirza | CHN | Peng Shuai | 17 | 3 |
| AUS | Ashleigh Barty | AUS | Casey Dellacqua | 28 | 4 |
| CAN | Gabriela Dabrowski | CHN | Xu Yifan | 38 | 5 |
| GER | Anna-Lena Grönefeld | CZE | Květa Peschke | 42 | 6 |
| POL | Alicja Rosolska | USA | Abigail Spears | 56 | 7 |
| ~~FRA~~ | ~~Kristina Mladenovic~~ | ~~RUS~~ | ~~Anastasia Pavlyuchenkova~~ | ~~58~~ | ~~8~~ |

- Rankings are as of September 18, 2017

=== Other entrants ===
The following pairs received wildcards into the doubles main draw:

- (China) Guo Shanshan / (China) Ye Qiuyu
- (China) Wang Qiang / (China) Wang Yafan

The following pair received entry as alternates:

- (Germany) Mona Barthel / (Germany) Carina Witthöft

=== Withdrawals ===
Before the tournament

- (Romania) Monica Niculescu
- (Latvia) Jeļena Ostapenko
- (Russia) Anastasia Pavlyuchenkova

During the tournament

- (Australia) Ashleigh Barty

=== Retirements ===
- (Russia) Ekaterina Makarova
- (China) Wang Qiang
- (Germany) Carina Witthöft

== Champions ==
=== Singles ===
- (France) Caroline Garcia def. (Australia) Ashleigh Barty, 6–7^{(3–7)}, 7–6^{(7–4)}, 6–2

=== Doubles ===
- (Chinese Taipei) Chan Yung-jan / (Switzerland) Martina Hingis def. (Japan) Shuko Aoyama / (China) Yang Zhaoxuan, 7–6^{(7–5)}, 3–6, [10–4]
