= 2015 Tianjin Open =

- Date: October 12–18
- Edition: 2nd
- Category: WTA International
- Draw: 32S / 16D
- Prize money: $50,000
- Surface: Hard
- Location: Tianjin, China

Champions

Singles
- (Poland) Agnieszka Radwańska

Doubles
- (China) Xu Yifan / (China) Zheng Saisai
- Tianjin Open

The 2015 Tianjin Open was a women's professional tennis tournament played on hardcourts. It was the second edition of the tournament and was part of the WTA International category of the 2015 WTA Tour. It took place in Tianjin, China between 12 October and 18 October 2015. Second-seeded Agnieszka Radwańska won the singles title.

== Finals ==
=== Singles ===
- (Poland) Agnieszka Radwańska defeated (Montenegro) Danka Kovinić 6–1, 6–2

=== Doubles ===
- (China) Xu Yifan / (China) Zheng Saisai defeated (Croatia) Darija Jurak / (United States) Nicole Melichar 6–2, 3–6, [10–8]

== Points and prize money ==
=== Point distribution ===
Event	W	F	SF	QF	Round of 16	Round of 32	Q	Q3	Q2	Q1
Singles	280	180	110	60	30	1	18	14	10	1
Doubles	280	180	110	60	1	—N/a	—N/a	—N/a	—N/a	—N/a

=== Prize money ===
Event	W	F	SF	QF	Round of 16	Round of 32^{1}	Q3	Q2	Q1
Singles	$111,163	$55,323	$29,730	$8,934	$4,928	$3,199	$1,852	$1,081	
Doubles *	$17,724	$9,222	$4,951	$2,623	$1,383	—N/a	—N/a	—N/a	—N/a

_{^{1} Qualifiers prize money is also the Round of 32 prize money}
_{* per team}

== Singles main-draw entrants ==
=== Seeds ===
Country	Player	Rank^{1}	Seed
ITA	Flavia Pennetta	7	1
POL	Agnieszka Radwańska	8	2
CZE	Karolína Plíšková	9	3
UKR	Elina Svitolina	18	4
FRA	Kristina Mladenovic	28	5
BRA	Teliana Pereira	52	6
USA	Alison Riske	60	7
CHN	Zheng Saisai	65	8

- ^{1} Rankings are as of October 5, 2015

=== Other entrants ===
The following players received wildcards into the singles main draw:

- (China) Duan Yingying
- (Italy) Flavia Pennetta
- (China) Zhang Yuxuan

The following players received entry from the qualifying draw:

- (Ukraine) Lyudmyla Kichenok
- (Ukraine) Nadiia Kichenok
- (Ukraine) Olga Savchuk
- (Czech Republic) Nicole Vaidišová

=== Withdrawals ===
Before the tournament

- (Switzerland) Belinda Bencic →replaced by (Russia) Alla Kudryavtseva
- (Romania) Alexandra Dulgheru →replaced by (Japan) Nao Hibino
- (New Zealand) Marina Erakovic →replaced by (Tunisia) Ons Jabeur
- (Slovenia) Polona Hercog →replaced by (Romania) Patricia Maria Țig
- (Romania) Monica Niculescu →replaced by (China) Liu Fangzhou

== Doubles main-draw entrants ==
=== Seeds ===
Country	Player	Country	Player	Rank^{1}	Seed
CHN	Han Xinyun	SUI	Martina Hingis	96	1
CHN	Xu Yifan	CHN	Zheng Saisai	104	2
UKR	Lyudmyla Kichenok	UKR	Nadiia Kichenok	115	3
UKR	Kateryna Bondarenko	UKR	Olga Savchuk	127	4

- ^{1} Rankings are as of October 5, 2015

=== Other entrants ===
The following pairs received a wildcard into the doubles main draw:

- (China) Xun Fangying / (China) Wang Yan
- (China) Kang Jiaqi / (China) Zhang Shuai

The following pair received entry as alternates:

- (Russia) Elizaveta Kulichkova / (Russia) Evgeniya Rodina

=== Withdrawals ===
Before the tournament

- (Romania) Patricia Maria Tig (left wrist injury)
