= 2014 Tianjin Open =

- Date: 6–12 October
- Edition: 1st
- Category: WTA International
- Draw: 32S / 16D
- Prize money: $250,000
- Surface: Hard
- Location: Tianjin, China

Champions

Singles
- (United States) Alison Riske

Doubles
- (Russia) Alla Kudryavtseva / (Australia) Anastasia Rodionova
- Tianjin Open

The 2014 Tianjin Open was a women's professional tennis tournament played on hard courts. It was the inaugural edition of the tournament, and was part of the WTA International category of the 2014 WTA Tour. It took place in Tianjin, China between 6 October and 12 October 2014. Sixth-seeded Alison Riske won the singles title.

== Finals ==
=== Singles ===
- (United States) Alison Riske defeated (Switzerland) Belinda Bencic, 6–3, 6–4

=== Doubles ===
- (Russia) Alla Kudryavtseva / (Australia) Anastasia Rodionova defeated (Romania) Sorana Cîrstea / (Slovenia) Andreja Klepač, 6–7^{(6–8)}, 6–2, [10–8]

== Points and prize money ==
=== Point distribution ===
Event	W	F	SF	QF	Round of 16	Round of 32	Q	Q3	Q2	Q1
Singles	280	180	110	60	30	1	18	14	10	1
Doubles	280	180	110	60	1	—N/a	—N/a	—N/a	—N/a	—N/a

=== Prize money ===
Event	W	F	SF	QF	Round of 16	Round of 32^{1}	Q3	Q2	Q1
Singles	$43,000	$21,400	$11,300	$5,900	$3,310	$1,925	$1,005	$730	$530
Doubles *	$12,300	$6,400	$3,435	$1,820	$960	—N/a	—N/a	—N/a	—N/a

_{^{1} Qualifiers prize money is also the Round of 32 prize money}
_{* per team}

== Singles main-draw entrants ==
=== Seeds ===
Country	Player	Rank^{1}	Seed
SRB	Jelena Janković	11	1
CHN	Peng Shuai	24	2
SUI	Belinda Bencic	34	3
USA	Varvara Lepchenko	35	4
CHN	Zhang Shuai	48	5
USA	Alison Riske	60	6
PUR	Monica Puig	64	7
CRO	Ajla Tomljanović	69	8

- ^{1} Rankings are as of September 29, 2014

=== Other entrants ===
The following players received wildcards into the singles main draw:

- (China) Liu Fangzhou
- (Italy) Francesca Schiavone
- (Hong Kong) Wu Ho-ching

The following players received entry from the qualifying draw:

- (Ukraine) Lyudmyla Kichenok
- (Ukraine) Nadiia Kichenok
- (Russia) Elizaveta Kulichkova
- (Israel) Shahar Pe'er

=== Withdrawals ===
Before the tournament

- (Slovakia) Daniela Hantuchová (left knee injury) → replaced by (Switzerland) Romina Oprandi
- (United Kingdom) Johanna Konta → replaced by (China) Duan Yingying
- (Kazakhstan) Yaroslava Shvedova → replaced by (Poland) Magda Linette
- (Ukraine) Lesia Tsurenko → replaced by (Australia) Anastasia Rodionova
- (Belgium) Yanina Wickmayer (allergic infection) → replaced by (Hong Kong) Zhang Ling
- (Canada) Aleksandra Wozniak → replaced by (Chinese Taipei) Hsieh Su-wei
- (Russia) Vera Zvonareva → replaced by (China) Zheng Saisai

During the tournament

- (Switzerland) Romina Oprandi (viral illness)

=== Retirements ===
- (China) Peng Shuai (exhaustion)

== Doubles main-draw entrants ==
=== Seeds ===
Country	Player	Country	Player	Rank^{1}	Seed
SUI	Martina Hingis	ITA	Flavia Pennetta	28	1
RUS	Alla Kudryavtseva	AUS	Anastasia Rodionova	38	2
USA	Alison Riske	CRO	Ajla Tomljanović	160	3
TPE	Chan Chin-wei	CHN	Xu Yifan	169	4

- ^{1} Rankings are as of September 29, 2014

=== Withdrawals ===
During the tournament

- (Switzerland) Romina Oprandi (viral illness)
