= 2016 Tianjin Open =

- Date: October 10–16
- Edition: 3rd
- Category: WTA International
- Draw: 32S / 16D
- Prize money: $500,000
- Surface: Hard
- Location: Tianjin, China

Champions

Singles
- (China) Peng Shuai

Doubles
- (United States) Christina McHale / (China) Peng Shuai
- Tianjin Open

The 2016 Tianjin Open was a women's professional tennis tournament played on hard courts. It was third edition of the tournament, and was part of the WTA International category of the 2016 WTA Tour. It took place in Tianjin, China between 10 October and 16 October 2016. Unseeded Peng Shuai, who entered the main draw on a wildcard, won the singles title.

== Finals ==
=== Singles ===
- (China) Peng Shuai defeated (United States) Alison Riske, 7–6^{(7–3)}, 6−2

=== Doubles ===
- (United States) Christina McHale / (China) Peng Shuai defeated (Poland) Magda Linette / (China) Xu Yifan, 7–6^{(10–8)}, 6−0

== Points and prize money ==
=== Point distribution ===
Event	W	F	SF	QF	Round of 16	Round of 32	Q	Q2	Q1
Singles	280	180	110	60	30	1	18	12	1
Doubles	280	180	110	60	1	—N/a	—N/a	—N/a	—N/a

=== Prize money ===
Event	W	F	SF	QF	Round of 16	Round of 32^{1}	Q2	Q1
Singles	$111,164	$55,324	$29,730	$8,898	$4,899	$3,026	$1,470	$865
Doubles *	$17,724	$9,222	$4,951	$2,623	$1,383	—N/a	—N/a	—N/a

_{^{1} Qualifiers prize money is also the Round of 32 prize money}
_{* per team}

== Singles main-draw entrants ==
=== Seeds ===
Country	Player	Rank^{1}	Seed
POL	Agnieszka Radwańska	3	1
RUS	Svetlana Kuznetsova	7	2
RUS	Elena Vesnina	20	3
HUN	Tímea Babos	26	4
PUR	Monica Puig	28	5
KAZ	Yulia Putintseva	33	6
CHN	Zhang Shuai	36	7
KAZ	Yaroslava Shvedova	39	8

- ^{1} Rankings are as of October 3, 2016

=== Other entrants ===
The following players received wildcards into the singles main draw:

- (China) Peng Shuai
- (China) Wang Yafan
- (China) Xu Yifan

The following players received entry from the qualifying draw:

- (Chinese Taipei) Chang Kai-chen
- (Czech Republic) Andrea Hlaváčková
- (Czech Republic) Lucie Hradecká
- (China) Liu Fangzhou
- (United States) Shelby Rogers
- (Serbia) Nina Stojanović

=== Withdrawals ===
Before the tournament

- (Switzerland) Timea Bacsinszky → replaced by (China) Han Xinyun
- (Romania) Irina-Camelia Begu → replaced by (Russia) Evgeniya Rodina
- (Chinese Taipei) Hsieh Su-wei → replaced by (China) Duan Yingying
- (Croatia) Mirjana Lučić-Baroni → replaced by (China) Zhang Kailin

During the tournament

- (Poland) Agnieszka Radwańska
- (China) Zhang Shuai

== Doubles main-draw entrants ==
=== Seeds ===
Country	Player	Country	Player	Rank^{1}	Seed
ESP	Arantxa Parra Santonja	AUS	Anastasia Rodionova	67	1
ESP	Lara Arruabarrena	GEO	Oksana Kalashnikova	114	2
ARG	María Irigoyen	GER	Tatjana Maria	114	3
USA	Christina McHale	CHN	Peng Shuai	116	4

- ^{1} Rankings are as of October 3, 2016

=== Other entrants ===
The following pairs received a wildcard into the doubles main draw:

- (China) Kang Jiaqi / (China) Liu Fangzhou
- (China) Gao Xinyu / (China) Zhang Ying
