= 2019 Tianjin Open =

- Date: October 7–13
- Edition: 6th
- Category: WTA International
- Draw: 32S / 16D
- Prize money: $500,000
- Surface: Hard
- Location: Tianjin, China
- Venue: Tuanbo International Tennis Centre

Champions

Singles
- (Sweden) Rebecca Peterson

Doubles
- (Japan) Shuko Aoyama / (Japan) Ena Shibahara
- Tianjin Open

The 2019 Tianjin Open was a women's professional tennis tournament played on hard courts. It was the sixth edition of the tournament, and was part of the WTA International category of the 2019 WTA Tour. It took place at the Tuanbo International Tennis Centre in Tianjin, China between 7 October and 13 October 2019. Unseeded Rebecca Peterson won the singles title.

== Finals ==
=== Singles ===
- (Sweden) Rebecca Peterson defeated (United Kingdom) Heather Watson, 6–4, 6–4

=== Doubles ===
- (Japan) Shuko Aoyama / (Japan) Ena Shibahara defeated (Japan) Nao Hibino / (Japan) Miyu Kato, 6–3, 7–5

== Points and prize money ==
=== Point distribution ===
Event	W	F	SF	QF	Round of 16	Round of 32	Q	Q3	Q2	Q1
Singles	280	180	110	60	30	1	18	14	10	1
Doubles	280	180	110	60	1	—N/a	—N/a	—N/a	—N/a	—N/a

=== Prize money ===
Event	W	F	SF	QF	Round of 16	Round of 32^{1}	Q3	Q2	Q1
Singles	$111,164	$55,324	$29,730	$8,898	$4,899	$3,026	$900	$750	$600
Doubles *	$17,724	$9,222	$4,950	$2,623	$1,383	—N/a	—N/a	—N/a	—N/a

_{^{1} Qualifiers prize money is also the Round of 32 prize money}
_{* per team}

== Singles main-draw entrants ==
=== Seeds ===
Country	Player	Rank^{1}	Seed
~~USA~~	~~Sofia Kenin~~	~~16~~	~~1~~
CHN	Wang Qiang	20	2
UKR	Dayana Yastremska	26	3
FRA	Caroline Garcia	31	4
~~CHN~~	~~Zhang Shuai~~	~~35~~	~~5~~
KAZ	Yulia Putintseva	37	6
CHN	Zheng Saisai	39	7
POL	Magda Linette	41	8

- ^{1} Rankings are as of September 30, 2019

=== Other entrants ===
The following players received wildcards into the singles main draw:

- (China) Duan Yingying
- (Australia) Samantha Stosur
- (China) Yang Zhaoxuan

The following player received entry into the main draw through a protected ranking:

- (Ukraine) Kateryna Bondarenko

The following players received entry from the qualifying draw:

- (Japan) Kurumi Nara
- (Australia) Arina Rodionova
- (China) Wang Xiyu
- (China) You Xiaodi

The following players received entry into the main draw as lucky losers:

- (China) Ma Shuyue
- (China) Wang Xinyu

=== Withdrawals ===
Before the tournament

- (United States) Amanda Anisimova → replaced by (Ukraine) Kateryna Bondarenko
- (Belarus) Victoria Azarenka → replaced by (United States) Jennifer Brady
- (Chinese Taipei) Hsieh Su-wei → replaced by (United Kingdom) Heather Watson
- (United States) Sofia Kenin → replaced by (China) Wang Xinyu
- (Belgium) Elise Mertens → replaced by (United States) Christina McHale
- (Spain) Garbiñe Muguruza → replaced by (Russia) Anastasia Potapova
- (Japan) Naomi Osaka → replaced by (Sweden) Rebecca Peterson
- (United States) Alison Riske → replaced by (China) Zhu Lin
- (Belarus) Aryna Sabalenka → replaced by (Australia) Astra Sharma
- (United States) Sloane Stephens → replaced by (United States) Kristie Ahn
- (Poland) Iga Świątek → replaced by (United States) Lauren Davis
- (China) Zhang Shuai → replaced by (China) Ma Shuyue

=== Retirements ===
- (Japan) Kurumi Nara (right thigh injury)
- (China) Wang Xinyu (low back injury)
- (China) Zheng Saisai (left abdominal muscle injury)

== Doubles main-draw entrants ==
=== Seeds ===
Country	Player	Country	Player	Rank^{1}	Seed
USA	Nicole Melichar	CHN	Xu Yifan	26	1
~~AUS~~	~~Samantha Stosur~~	~~CHN~~	~~Zhang Shuai~~	~~30~~	~~2~~
CRO	Darija Jurak	USA	Desirae Krawczyk	73	3
CHN	Duan Yingying	CHN	Peng Shuai	84	4

- ^{1} Rankings are as of September 30, 2019

=== Other entrants ===
The following pair received a wildcard into the doubles main draw:

- (Hong Kong) Ng Kwan-yau / (China) Zheng Saisai

The following pair received entry as alternates:

- (China) Xu Shilin / (China) You Xiaodi

=== Withdrawals ===
Before the tournament

- (China) Wang Xinyu (low back injury)
- (China) Zhang Shuai (right elbow injury)

During the tournament

- (Belgium) Yanina Wickmayer (right foot injury)
