= 2017 Tianjin Open =

- Date: October 9–15
- Edition: 4th
- Category: WTA International
- Draw: 32S / 16D
- Prize money: $500,000
- Surface: Hard
- Location: Tianjin, China
- Venue: Tuanbo International Tennis Centre

Champions

Singles
- (Russia) Maria Sharapova

Doubles
- (Romania) Irina-Camelia Begu / (Italy) Sara Errani
- Tianjin Open

The 2017 Tianjin Open was a women's professional tennis tournament played on hard courts. It was the 4th edition of the tournament, and was part of the WTA International category of the 2017 WTA Tour. It took place at the Tuanbo International Tennis Centre in Tianjin, China between 9 October and 15 October 2017. Unseeded Maria Sharapova, who entered the main draw on a wildcard, won the singles title.

== Finals ==
=== Singles ===
- (Russia) Maria Sharapova defeated (Belarus) Aryna Sabalenka, 7–5, 7–6 ^{(10–8)}

=== Doubles ===
- (Romania) Irina-Camelia Begu / (Italy) Sara Errani defeated (Slovenia) Dalila Jakupović / (Serbia) Nina Stojanović, 6–4, 6–3

== Points and prize money ==
=== Point distribution ===
Event	W	F	SF	QF	Round of 16	Round of 32	Q	Q2	Q1
Singles	280	180	110	60	30	1	18	12	1
Doubles	280	180	110	60	1	—N/a	—N/a	—N/a	—N/a

=== Prize money ===
Event	W	F	SF	QF	Round of 16	Round of 32^{1}	Q2	Q1
Singles	$111,164	$55,324	$29,730	$8,898	$4,899	$3,026	$1,470	$865
Doubles *	$17,724	$9,222	$4,951	$2,623	$1,383	—N/a	—N/a	—N/a

_{^{1} Qualifiers prize money is also the Round of 32 prize money}
_{* per team}

== Singles main-draw entrants ==
=== Seeds ===
Country	Player	Rank^{1}	Seed
~~FRA~~	~~Caroline Garcia~~	~~15~~	~~1~~
CZE	Petra Kvitová	18	2
CHN	Peng Shuai	25	3
CRO	Donna Vekić	46	4
KAZ	Yulia Putintseva	48	5
GRE	Maria Sakkari	50	6
UKR	Lesia Tsurenko	51	7
USA	Alison Riske	53	8
ROU	Irina-Camelia Begu	57	9

- ^{1} Rankings are as of October 2, 2017

=== Other entrants ===
The following players received wildcards into the singles main draw:

- (China) Liu Fangzhou
- (Russia) Maria Sharapova
- (China) Wang Xiyu

The following players received entry from the qualifying draw:

- (United States) Lauren Davis
- (Italy) Sara Errani
- (China) Guo Hanyu
- (China) Lu Jingjing
- (Australia) Arina Rodionova
- (Switzerland) Stefanie Vögele

The following player received entry as lucky loser:

- (China) Han Xinyun

=== Withdrawals ===
Before the tournament

- (Japan) Misaki Doi →replaced by (United States) Kristie Ahn
- (France) Caroline Garcia →replaced by (China) Han Xinyun
- (Germany) Sabine Lisicki →replaced by (China) Zhu Lin
- (Russia) Evgeniya Rodina →replaced by (Belarus) Aryna Sabalenka

== Doubles main-draw entrants ==
=== Seeds ===
Country	Player	Country	Player	Rank^{1}	Seed
UKR	Kateryna Bondarenko	RUS	Alla Kudryavtseva	164	1
JPN	Nao Hibino	MNE	Danka Kovinić	167	2
SLO	Dalila Jakupović	SRB	Nina Stojanović	169	3
CHN	Liang Chen	CHN	Lu Jingjing	210	4

- ^{1} Rankings are as of October 2, 2017
