= 2015 Tianjin Open – Singles =

Singles
- 2015 Tianjin Open

Final
- Champion: (Poland) Agnieszka Radwańska
- Runner-up: (Montenegro) Danka Kovinić
- Score: 6–1, 6–2

Details
- Draw: 32
- Seeds: 8

Events
Singles	Doubles
- Tianjin Open

Alison Riske was the defending champion, but lost in the second round to Tímea Babos.

Agnieszka Radwańska won the title, defeating Danka Kovinić in the final, 6–1, 6–2.

Nicole Vaidišová played her final WTA tournament here, losing as a qualifier in the first round.

== Seeds ==
1. (Italy) Flavia Pennetta (first round)
2. (Poland) Agnieszka Radwańska (champion)
3. (Czech Republic) Karolína Plíšková (semifinals)
4. (Ukraine) Elina Svitolina (first round)
5. (France) Kristina Mladenovic (quarterfinals)
6. (Brazil) Teliana Pereira (second round)
7. (United States) Alison Riske (second round)
8. (China) Zheng Saisai (first round)

== Draw ==
Key

- Q = Qualifier
- WC = Wild card
- LL = Lucky loser
- Alt = Alternate
- ITF = ITF entry
- PR = Protected ranking
- SR = Special ranking
- SE = Special exempt
- JE = Junior exempt
- JR = Junior Accelerator Programme entrant
- CO = College Accelerator Programme entrant
- NG = Next Gen Accelerator Program entrant
- w/o = Walkover
- r = Retired
- d = Defaulted

=== Finals ===
Semifinals
(Montenegro) Danka Kovinić	6	6^{2}	6
(Serbia) Bojana Jovanovski	4	7^{7}	2
3	(Czech Republic) Karolína Plíšková	3	1
2	(Poland) Agnieszka Radwańska	6	6

Final
(Montenegro) Danka Kovinić	1	2
2	(Poland) Agnieszka Radwańska	6	6

=== Top half ===
First round
1/WC	(Italy) F Pennetta	3	5
Q	(Ukraine) L Kichenok	6	7
Q	(Czech Republic) N Vaidišová	3	3
WC	(China) Y Duan	6	6
(Montenegro) D Kovinić	6	6
(Ukraine) K Bondarenko	4	1
(Japan) N Hibino	5	2
6	(Brazil) T Pereira	7	6
4	(Ukraine) E Svitolina	2	4
(Russia) E Vesnina	6	6
(Tunisia) O Jabeur	7^{7}	6^{4}	1
(Serbia) B Jovanovski	6^{1}	7^{7}	6
(Poland) U Radwańska	6	6
Q	(Ukraine) N Kichenok	4	0
(China) F Liu	0	1
5	(France) K Mladenovic	6	6

Second round
Q	(Ukraine) L Kichenok	7^{7}	2	4
WC	(China) Y Duan	6^{5}	6	6
(Montenegro) D Kovinić	6	5	6
6	(Brazil) T Pereira	2	7	1
(Russia) E Vesnina	3	1
(Serbia) B Jovanovski	6	6
(Poland) U Radwańska	4	4
5	(France) K Mladenovic	6	6

Quarterfinals
WC	(China) Y Duan	5	6	3
(Montenegro) D Kovinić	7	3	6
(Serbia) B Jovanovski	6	4	6
5	(France) K Mladenovic	4	6	3

Semifinals
(Montenegro) D Kovinić	6	6^{2}	6
(Serbia) B Jovanovski	4	7^{7}	2

=== Bottom half ===
First round
7	(United States) A Riske	6	6
(China) X Han	0	4
(Hungary) T Babos	6	6
(Russia) A Kudryavtseva	0	1
(Poland) M Linette	7^{7}	6
(Kazakhstan) Y Putintseva	6^{3}	1
(Slovakia) K Kučová	6	3	5
3	(Czech Republic) Ka Plíšková	3	6	7
8	(China) S Zheng	5	3
(Russia) E Rodina	7	6
(Russia) E Kulichkova	6	6
(Romania) PM Țig	4	3
(China) Q Wang	7	6
WC	(China) Yu Zhang	5	4
Q	(Ukraine) O Savchuk	1	0
2	(Poland) A Radwańska	6	6

Second round
7	(United States) A Riske	3	3
(Hungary) T Babos	6	6
(Poland) M Linette	2	1
3	(Czech Republic) Ka Plíšková	6	6
(Russia) E Rodina	2	5
(Russia) E Kulichkova	6	7
(China) Q Wang	1	1
2	(Poland) A Radwańska	6	6

Quarterfinals
(Hungary) T Babos	3	2
3	(Czech Republic) Ka Plíšková	6	6
(Russia) E Kulichkova	6^{3}	2
2	(Poland) A Radwańska	7^{7}	6

Semifinals
3	(Czech Republic) Ka Plíšková	3	1
2	(Poland) A Radwańska	6	6

== Qualifying ==
=== Seeds ===
1. (Czech Republic) Andrea Hlaváčková (first round)
2. (China) Yang Zhaoxuan (qualifying competition)
3. (China) Zhang Shuai (second round)
4. (Russia) Ekaterina Bychkova (second round)
5. (China) Xu Yifan (first round)
6. (Ukraine) Olga Savchuk (qualified)
7. (Japan) Hiroko Kuwata (qualifying competition)
8. (Uzbekistan) Sabina Sharipova (first round)

=== Qualifiers ===
1. (Ukraine) Olga Savchuk
2. (Ukraine) Lyudmyla Kichenok
3. (Czech Republic) Nicole Vaidišová
4. (Ukraine) Nadiia Kichenok

=== Draw ===
==== First qualifier ====
First round
1	(Czech Republic) Andrea Hlaváčková	3	2
(United States) Nicole Melichar	6	6
(Belarus) Lidziya Marozava	7^{7}	5	2
(Russia) Ksenia Lykina	6^{5}	7	6
(China) Zhao Di	7^{7}	4	6
(China) Xun Fangying	6^{2}	6	2
(Slovenia) Nastja Kolar	0	4
6	(Ukraine) Olga Savchuk	6	6

Second round
(United States) Nicole Melichar	6	0	6
(Russia) Ksenia Lykina	4	6	2
(China) Zhao Di	2	1
6	(Ukraine) Olga Savchuk	6	6

Qualifying competition
(United States) Nicole Melichar	5	6	1
6	(Ukraine) Olga Savchuk	7	4	6

==== Second qualifier ====
First round
2	(China) Yang Zhaoxuan	2	7^{9}	6
(China) Wang Yan	6	6^{7}	2
(China) Kang Jiaqi	6	6
(China) Yu Yuanyi	2	2
(Russia) Irina Khromacheva	6	6
(Uzbekistan) Akgul Amanmuradova	2	4
(Ukraine) Lyudmyla Kichenok	6	6
8	(Uzbekistan) Sabina Sharipova	2	2

Second round
2	(China) Yang Zhaoxuan	6	6
(China) Kang Jiaqi	2	0
(Russia) Irina Khromacheva	6	6^{1}	2
(Ukraine) Lyudmyla Kichenok	2	7^{7}	6

Qualifying competition
2	(China) Yang Zhaoxuan	3	2
(Ukraine) Lyudmyla Kichenok	6	6

==== Third qualifier ====
First round
3/WC	(China) Zhang Shuai	6	6
WC	(China) Zhang Ying	3	1
(Slovakia) Chantal Škamlová	6	2	0
(Czech Republic) Nicole Vaidišová	3	6	6
(Germany) Carolin Daniels	6	6
(Chinese Taipei) Hsu Ching-wen	0	2
(United Kingdom) Emily Webley-Smith	7	3	4
7	(Japan) Hiroko Kuwata	5	6	6

Second round
3/WC	(China) Zhang Shuai	4	1
(Czech Republic) Nicole Vaidišová	6	6
(Germany) Carolin Daniels	7	1	2
7	(Japan) Hiroko Kuwata	5	6	6

Qualifying competition
(Czech Republic) Nicole Vaidišová	6	5	6
7	(Japan) Hiroko Kuwata	1	7	4

==== Fourth qualifier ====
First round
4	(Russia) Ekaterina Bychkova	5	6	6
(Japan) Kyoka Okamura	7	1	3
(China) Lu Jingjing	6	6
(Canada) Gabriela Dabrowski	2	4
(Ukraine) Nadiia Kichenok	5	6	6
(China) Xu Shilin	7	4	4
(Japan) Makoto Ninomiya	1	6	6
5	(China) Xu Yifan	6	3	4

Second round
4	(Russia) Ekaterina Bychkova	3	6	3
(China) Lu Jingjing	6	3	6
(Ukraine) Nadiia Kichenok	6	6
(Japan) Makoto Ninomiya	4	4

Qualifying competition
(China) Lu Jingjing	2	2
(Ukraine) Nadiia Kichenok	6	6
