= 2015 Tianjin Open – Doubles =

Doubles
- 2015 Tianjin Open

Final
- Champions: (China) Xu Yifan (China) Zheng Saisai
- Runners-up: (Croatia) Darija Jurak (United States) Nicole Melichar
- Score: 6–2, 3–6, [10–8]

Details
- Draw: 16
- Seeds: 4

Events
Singles	Doubles
- Tianjin Open

Alla Kudryavtseva and Anastasia Rodionova were the defending champions, but chose not to participate.

Xu Yifan and Zheng Saisai won the title, defeating Darija Jurak and Nicole Melichar in the final, 6–2, 3–6, [10–8].

== Seeds ==
1. (China) Han Xinyun / (Switzerland) Martina Hingis (first round)
2. (China) Xu Yifan / (China) Zheng Saisai (champions)
3. (Ukraine) Lyudmyla Kichenok / (Ukraine) Nadiia Kichenok (semifinals)
4. (Ukraine) Kateryna Bondarenko / (Ukraine) Olga Savchuk (semifinals)

== Draw ==
Key

- Q = Qualifier
- WC = Wild card
- LL = Lucky loser
- Alt = Alternate
- ITF = ITF entry
- PR = Protected ranking
- SR = Special ranking
- SE = Special exempt
- JE = Junior exempt
- JR = Junior Accelerator Programme entrant
- CO = College Accelerator Programme entrant
- NG = Next Gen Accelerator Program entrant
- w/o = Walkover
- r = Retired
- d = Defaulted

First round
1	(China) X Han (Switzerland) M Hingis	5	6	[2]
(Croatia) D Jurak (United States) N Melichar	7	3	[10]
WC	(China) J Kang (China) S Zhang	6	4	[10]
(Slovenia) N Kolar (Slovakia) C Škamlová	3	6	[2]
3	(Ukraine) L Kichenok (Ukraine) N Kichenok	6	2	[10]
(Germany) C Daniels (Belarus) L Marozava	2	6	[3]
(Russia) I Khromacheva (Russia) K Lykina	1	7	[7]
(Hungary) T Babos (Poland) M Linette	6	5	[10]
(Japan) H Kuwata (Japan) M Ninomiya	6	3	[9]
(Canada) G Dabrowski (United States) A Riske	4	6	[11]
(China) S Xu (China) Z Yang	5	5
4	(Ukraine) K Bondarenko (Ukraine) O Savchuk	7	7
(Japan) N Hibino (United Kingdom) E Webley-Smith	3	6	[10]
WC	(China) Y Wang (China) F Xun	6	3	[7]
Alt	(Russia) E Kulichkova (Russia) E Rodina	4	3
2	(China) Y Xu (China) S Zheng	6	6

Quarterfinals
(Croatia) D Jurak (United States) N Melichar	6	6
WC	(China) J Kang (China) S Zhang	1	3
3	(Ukraine) L Kichenok (Ukraine) N Kichenok	6	7
(Hungary) T Babos (Poland) M Linette	2	5
(Canada) G Dabrowski (United States) A Riske	2	3
4	(Ukraine) K Bondarenko (Ukraine) O Savchuk	6	6
(Japan) N Hibino (United Kingdom) E Webley-Smith	1	4
2	(China) Y Xu (China) S Zheng	6	6

Semifinals
(Croatia) D Jurak (United States) N Melichar	6	7^{7}
3	(Ukraine) L Kichenok (Ukraine) N Kichenok	3	6^{5}
4	(Ukraine) K Bondarenko (Ukraine) O Savchuk	6	1	[7]
2	(China) Y Xu (China) S Zheng	3	6	[10]

Final
(Croatia) D Jurak (United States) N Melichar	2	6	[8]
2	(China) Y Xu (China) S Zheng	6	3	[10]
