= 2016 Tianjin Open – Singles =

Singles
- 2016 Tianjin Open

Final
- Champion: (China) Peng Shuai
- Runner-up: (United States) Alison Riske
- Score: 7–6^{(7-3)}, 6–2

Details
- Draw: 32
- Seeds: 8

Events
Singles	Doubles
- Tianjin Open

Agnieszka Radwańska was the defending champion, but withdrew before her quarterfinal match with a right thigh injury.

Peng Shuai, a Tianjin native, won her first WTA singles title, defeating Alison Riske in the final, 7–6^{(7–3)}, 6–2.

== Seeds ==
1. (Poland) Agnieszka Radwańska (quarterfinals, withdrew)
2. (Russia) Svetlana Kuznetsova (semifinals)
3. (Russia) Elena Vesnina (first round)
4. (Hungary) Tímea Babos (first round)
5. (Puerto Rico) Monica Puig (quarterfinals)
6. (Kazakhstan) Yulia Putintseva (first round)
7. (China) Zhang Shuai (first round, withdrew)
8. (Kazakhstan) Yaroslava Shvedova (first round)

== Draw ==
Key

- Q = Qualifier
- WC = Wild card
- LL = Lucky loser
- Alt = Alternate
- ITF = ITF entry
- PR = Protected ranking
- SR = Special ranking
- SE = Special exempt
- JE = Junior exempt
- JR = Junior Accelerator Programme entrant
- CO = College Accelerator Programme entrant
- NG = Next Gen Accelerator Program entrant
- w/o = Walkover
- r = Retired
- d = Defaulted

=== Finals ===
Semifinals
WC	(China) Peng Shuai	3	7	6
(Montenegro) Danka Kovinić	6	5	3
(United States) Alison Riske	6	5	6
2	(Russia) Svetlana Kuznetsova	4	7	4

Final
WC	(China) Peng Shuai	7^{7}	6
(United States) Alison Riske	6^{3}	2

=== Top half ===
First round
1	(Poland) A Radwańska	6	6
(Germany) T Maria	1	2
(Russia) E Rodina	6	5	6
(United States) C McHale	1	7	0
(United States) V King	1	2
Q	(Chinese Taipei) K-c Chang	6	6
WC	(China) S Peng	w/o
7	(China) S Zhang
3	(Russia) E Vesnina	5	6	6^{4}
Q	(United States) S Rogers	7	4	7^{7}
(China) Y Duan	4	3
(Montenegro) D Kovinić	6	6
Q	(China) F Liu	4	6	4
(Spain) L Arruabarrena	6	2	6
(Japan) K Nara	3	6^{5}
5	(Puerto Rico) M Puig	6	7^{7}

Second round
1	(Poland) A Radwańska	6	6
(Russia) E Rodina	1	1
Q	(Chinese Taipei) K-c Chang	3	2
WC	(China) S Peng	6	6
Q	(United States) S Rogers	6	1	2
(Montenegro) D Kovinić	2	6	6
(Spain) L Arruabarrena	4	2
5	(Puerto Rico) M Puig	6	6

Quarterfinals
1	(Poland) A Radwańska
WC	(China) S Peng	w/o
(Montenegro) D Kovinić	6	6
5	(Puerto Rico) M Puig	4	3

Semifinals
WC	(China) S Peng	3	7	6
(Montenegro) D Kovinić	6	5	3

=== Bottom half ===
First round
6	(Kazakhstan) Y Putintseva	6	3	4
WC	(China) Y Wang	3	6	6
(China) X Han	4	6	6
WC	(China) Y Xu	6	1	0
(Poland) M Linette	7^{8}	6
Q	(Serbia) N Stojanović	6^{6}	0
(United States) A Riske	2	6	6
4	(Hungary) T Babos	6	4	3
8	(Kazakhstan) Y Shvedova	4	2
(Japan) N Osaka	6	6
Q	(Czech Republic) A Hlaváčková	5	4
Q	(Czech Republic) L Hradecká	7	6
(Croatia) D Vekić	3	7	6
(China) K Zhang	6	5	3
(France) P Parmentier	1	3
2	(Russia) S Kuznetsova	6	6

Second round
WC	(China) Y Wang	5	3
(China) X Han	7	6
(Poland) M Linette	3	6^{2}
(United States) A Riske	6	7^{7}
(Japan) N Osaka	6	7^{7}
Q	(Czech Republic) L Hradecká	2	6^{4}
(Croatia) D Vekić	5	4
2	(Russia) S Kuznetsova	7	6

Quarterfinals
(China) X Han	3	3
(United States) A Riske	6	6
(Japan) N Osaka	6	4	6^{3}
2	(Russia) S Kuznetsova	2	6	7^{7}

Semifinals
(United States) A Riske	6	5	6
2	(Russia) S Kuznetsova	4	7	4

== Qualifying ==
=== Seeds ===
1. (United States) Shelby Rogers (qualified)
2. (China) Han Xinyun (moved to main draw)
3. (Turkey) İpek Soylu (first round)
4. (Uzbekistan) Sabina Sharipova (qualifying competition)
5. (China) Liu Fangzhou (qualified)
6. (Japan) Hiroko Kuwata (qualifying competition)
7. (Serbia) Nina Stojanović (qualified)
8. (Georgia (country)) Sofia Shapatava (qualifying competition)
9. (Czech Republic) Lucie Hradecká (qualified)
10. (China) Xu Shilin (first round)
11. (Japan) Akiko Omae (first round)
12. (Chinese Taipei) Chang Kai-chen (qualified)
13. (Poland) Katarzyna Piter (first round)

=== Qualifiers ===
1. (United States) Shelby Rogers
2. (Chinese Taipei) Chang Kai-chen
3. (Czech Republic) Andrea Hlaváčková
4. (Serbia) Nina Stojanović
5. (China) Liu Fangzhou
6. (Czech Republic) Lucie Hradecká

=== Draw ===
==== First qualifier ====
First round
1	(United States) Shelby Rogers	7^{7}	6
WC	(China) You Xiaodi	6^{5}	3
(United States) Jacqueline Cako	5	6	6
11	(Japan) Akiko Omae	7	2	3

Qualifying competition
1	(United States) Shelby Rogers	6	6
(United States) Jacqueline Cako	4	2

==== Second qualifier ====
First round
13	(Poland) Katarzyna Piter	3	3
(United States) Danielle Lao	6	6
WC	(China) Zhang Ying	2	0
12	(Chinese Taipei) Chang Kai-chen	6	6

Qualifying competition
(United States) Danielle Lao	4	6	4
12	(Chinese Taipei) Chang Kai-chen	6	1	6

==== Third qualifier ====
First round
3	(Turkey) İpek Soylu	4	4
(Czech Republic) Andrea Hlaváčková	6	6
(Thailand) Varatchaya Wongteanchai	6	6
10	(China) Xu Shilin	1	1

Qualifying competition
(Czech Republic) Andrea Hlaváčková	7	6
(Thailand) Varatchaya Wongteanchai	5	2

==== Fourth qualifier ====
First round
4	(Uzbekistan) Sabina Sharipova	2	7	6
Alt	(China) Wang Yan	6	5	1
WC	(China) Gao Xinyu	3	3
7	(Serbia) Nina Stojanović	6	6

Qualifying competition
4	(Uzbekistan) Sabina Sharipova	6	3	6^{2}
7	(Serbia) Nina Stojanović	1	6	7^{7}

==== Fifth qualifier ====
First round
5	(China) Liu Fangzhou	6	2	6
WC	(China) Kang Jiaqi	3	6	3
(China) Xun Fangying	6^{5}	5
8	(Georgia (country)) Sofia Shapatava	7^{7}	7

Qualifying competition
5	(China) Liu Fangzhou	6	6
8	(Georgia (country)) Sofia Shapatava	1	2

==== Sixth qualifier ====
First round
6	(Japan) Hiroko Kuwata	6	6
(Japan) Ayaka Okuno	1	2
(Ukraine) Olga Savchuk	3	2
9	(Czech Republic) Lucie Hradecká	6	6

Qualifying competition
6	(Japan) Hiroko Kuwata	3	0
9	(Czech Republic) Lucie Hradecká	6	6
