= 2014 Tianjin Open – Doubles =

Doubles
- 2014 Tianjin Open

Final
- Champions: (Russia) Alla Kudryavtseva (Australia) Anastasia Rodionova
- Runners-up: (Romania) Sorana Cîrstea (Slovenia) Andreja Klepač
- Score: 6–7^{(6–8)}, 6–2, [10–8]

Details
- Draw: 16
- Seeds: 4

Events
Singles	Doubles
- Tianjin Open

Alla Kudryavtseva and Anastasia Rodionova won the first edition of the tournament, defeating Sorana Cîrstea and Andreja Klepač in the final, 6–7^{(6–8)}, 6–2, [10–8].

== Seeds ==
1. (Switzerland) Martina Hingis / (Italy) Flavia Pennetta (quarterfinals)
2. (Russia) Alla Kudryavtseva / (Australia) Anastasia Rodionova (champions)
3. (United States) Alison Riske / (Croatia) Ajla Tomljanović (semifinals)
4. (Chinese Taipei) Chan Chin-wei / (China) Xu Yifan (semifinals)

== Draw ==
Key

- Q = Qualifier
- WC = Wild card
- LL = Lucky loser
- Alt = Alternate
- ITF = ITF entry
- PR = Protected ranking
- SR = Special ranking
- SE = Special exempt
- JE = Junior exempt
- JR = Junior Accelerator Programme entrant
- CO = College Accelerator Programme entrant
- NG = Next Gen Accelerator Program entrant
- w/o = Walkover
- r = Retired
- d = Defaulted

First round
1	(Switzerland) M Hingis (Italy) F Pennetta	6	6
(Poland) M Linette (Hong Kong) L Zhang	0	2
(Romania) S Cîrstea (Slovenia) A Klepač	6	6
(Turkey) Ç Büyükakçay (Montenegro) D Kovinić	2	2
3	(United States) A Riske (Croatia) A Tomljanović	6	6
(Chinese Taipei) W-h Hsu (China) L Zhu	2	3
(Chinese Taipei) C-j Chuang (Belarus) O Govortsova	6	6
(China) R Tian (China) Z Yang	4	3
(Chinese Taipei) S-y Hsieh (China) S Xu	1	6^{5}
(Ukraine) L Kichenok (Ukraine) N Kichenok	6	7^{7}
(Switzerland) B Bencic (Switzerland) R Oprandi
4	(Chinese Taipei) C-w Chan (China) Y Xu	w/o
(China) C Liang (China) S Zhang	6	3	[10]
(United States) V Lepchenko (China) S Zheng	1	6	[6]
(China) X Han (China) K Zhang	2	6^{2}
2	(Russia) A Kudryavtseva (Australia) An Rodionova	6	7^{7}

Quarterfinals
1	(Switzerland) M Hingis (Italy) F Pennetta	6	6^{1}	[6]
(Romania) S Cîrstea (Slovenia) A Klepač	3	7^{7}	[10]
3	(United States) A Riske (Croatia) A Tomljanović	6	6
(Chinese Taipei) C-j Chuang (Belarus) O Govortsova	4	1
(Ukraine) L Kichenok (Ukraine) N Kichenok	6	6^{2}	[5]
4	(Chinese Taipei) C-w Chan (China) Y Xu	3	7^{7}	[10]
(China) C Liang (China) S Zhang	2	2
2	(Russia) A Kudryavtseva (Australia) An Rodionova	6	6

Semifinals
(Romania) S Cîrstea (Slovenia) A Klepač	6	6
3	(United States) A Riske (Croatia) A Tomljanović	4	4
4	(Chinese Taipei) C-w Chan (China) Y Xu	4	6	[9]
2	(Russia) A Kudryavtseva (Australia) An Rodionova	6	4	[11]

Final
(Romania) S Cîrstea (Slovenia) A Klepač	7^{8}	2	[8]
2	(Russia) A Kudryavtseva (Australia) An Rodionova	6^{6}	6	[10]
