= 2017 Tianjin Open – Singles =

Singles
- 2017 Tianjin Open

Final
- Champion: (Russia) Maria Sharapova
- Runner-up: (Belarus) Aryna Sabalenka
- Score: 7–5, 7–6^{(10–8)}

Details
- Draw: 32
- Seeds: 8

Events
Singles	Doubles
- Tianjin Open

Maria Sharapova defeated Aryna Sabalenka in the final, 7–5, 7–6^{(10–8)} to win the singles tennis title at the 2017 Tianjin Open. It was Sharapova's first title since serving a suspension for a doping offense.

Peng Shuai was the defending champion, but lost in the semifinals to Sharapova.

== Seeds ==
1. (France) Caroline Garcia (withdrew)
2. (Czech Republic) Petra Kvitová (first round)
3. (China) Peng Shuai (semifinals)
4. (Croatia) Donna Vekić (first round)
5. (Kazakhstan) Yulia Putintseva (second round)
6. (Greece) Maria Sakkari (second round)
7. (Ukraine) Lesia Tsurenko (first round)
8. (United States) Alison Riske (first round)
9. (Romania) Irina-Camelia Begu (first round)

== Draw ==
Key

- Q = Qualifier
- WC = Wild card
- LL = Lucky loser
- Alt = Alternate
- ITF = ITF entry
- PR = Protected ranking
- SR = Special ranking
- SE = Special exempt
- JE = Junior exempt
- JR = Junior Accelerator Programme entrant
- CO = College Accelerator Programme entrant
- NG = Next Gen Accelerator Program entrant
- w/o = Walkover
- r = Retired
- d = Defaulted

=== Finals ===
Semifinals
WC	(Russia) Maria Sharapova	6	6
3	(China) Peng Shuai	3	1
Q	(Italy) Sara Errani	1	3
(Belarus) Aryna Sabalenka	6	6

Final
WC	(Russia) Maria Sharapova	7	7^{10}
(Belarus) Aryna Sabalenka	5	6^{8}

=== Top half ===
First round
9	(Romania) I-C Begu	4	2
WC	(Russia) M Sharapova	6	6
(Poland) M Linette	3	6	7
(Ukraine) K Bondarenko	6	3	5
Q	(Switzerland) S Vögele	6	6
(United States) K Ahn	3	3
Q	(United States) L Davis	6^{2}	6	2
5	(Kazakhstan) Y Putintseva	7^{7}	4	6
3	(China) S Peng	6	7^{7}
Q	(China) H Guo	2	6^{5}
WC	(China) X Wang	6	7^{10}
(Montenegro) D Kovinić	3	6^{8}
Q	(Australia) Ar Rodionova	2	7^{7}	4
(Spain) S Sorribes Tormo	6	6^{3}	6
(China) Y Wang	6	6
8	(United States) A Riske	3	3

Second round
WC	(Russia) M Sharapova	7	6
(Poland) M Linette	5	3
Q	(Switzerland) S Vögele	6	6
5	(Kazakhstan) Y Putintseva	2	3
3	(China) S Peng	6	6
WC	(China) X Wang	2	2
(Spain) S Sorribes Tormo	6	2	6
(China) Y Wang	4	6	3

Quarterfinals
WC	(Russia) M Sharapova	6	6
Q	(Switzerland) S Vögele	3	1
3	(China) S Peng	6	6
(Spain) S Sorribes Tormo	0	1

Semifinals
WC	(Russia) M Sharapova	6	6
3	(China) S Peng	3	1

=== Bottom half ===
First round
6	(Greece) M Sakkari	6	6
WC	(China) F Liu	2	1
(United States) C McHale	6	6
(Japan) N Hibino	3	3
Q	(Italy) S Errani	6	6
(Ukraine) K Kozlova	2	1
(Brazil) B Haddad Maia	6^{4}	6	6
4	(Croatia) D Vekić	7^{7}	4	2
7	(Ukraine) L Tsurenko	4	6^{2}
(China) Y Duan	6	7^{7}
(Belarus) A Sabalenka	6	6
LL	(China) X Han	3	3
(Chinese Taipei) S-w Hsieh	6	6
Q	(China) Jin Lu	2	2
(China) L Zhu	6	5	6
2	(Czech Republic) P Kvitová	4	7	4

Second round
6	(Greece) M Sakkari	0	4
(United States) C McHale	6	6
Q	(Italy) S Errani	6	4	6
(Brazil) B Haddad Maia	4	6	3
(China) Y Duan	3	3
(Belarus) A Sabalenka	6	6
(Chinese Taipei) S-w Hsieh	3	1
(China) L Zhu	6	6

Quarterfinals
(United States) C McHale	7	6^{2}	1
Q	(Italy) S Errani	5	7^{7}	6
(Belarus) A Sabalenka	6	6
(China) L Zhu	3	4

Semifinals
Q	(Italy) S Errani	1	3
(Belarus) A Sabalenka	6	6

== Qualifying ==
=== Seeds ===
1. (United States) Lauren Davis (qualified)
2. (Australia) Arina Rodionova (qualified)
3. (China) Han Xinyun (qualifying competition, lucky loser)
4. (China) Lu Jingjing (qualified)
5. (Serbia) Nina Stojanović (qualifying competition)
6. (Switzerland) Stefanie Vögele (qualified)
7. (China) Zhang Kailin (qualifying competition)
8. (China) Gao Xinyu (first round)
9. (Slovenia) Dalila Jakupović (first round)
10. (Japan) Hiroko Kuwata (qualifying competition)
11. (Canada) Gabriela Dabrowski (first round)
12. (Italy) Sara Errani (qualified)

=== Qualifiers ===
1. (United States) Lauren Davis
2. (Australia) Arina Rodionova
3. (Italy) Sara Errani
4. (China) Lu Jingjing
5. (China) Guo Hanyu
6. (Switzerland) Stefanie Vögele

=== Lucky loser ===
1. (China) Han Xinyun

=== Draw ===
==== First qualifier ====
First round
1	(United States) Lauren Davis	3	6	7^{7}
(Japan) Kyōka Okamura	6	3	6^{0}
(China) Sun Xuliu	4	6	6
8	(China) Gao Xinyu	6	4	4

Qualifying competition
1	(United States) Lauren Davis	6	6
(China) Sun Xuliu	2	2

==== Second qualifier ====
First round
2	(Australia) Arina Rodionova	6	6
WC	(China) Zheng Wushuang	2	3
(Russia) Alla Kudryavtseva	3	3
10	(Japan) Hiroko Kuwata	6	6

Qualifying competition
2	(Australia) Arina Rodionova	6	6
10	(Japan) Hiroko Kuwata	1	4

==== Third qualifier ====
First round
3	(China) Han Xinyun	6	4	6
WC	(China) Liu Yanni	0	6	0
(China) You Xiaodi	2	1
12	(Italy) Sara Errani	6	6

Qualifying competition
3	(China) Han Xinyun	3	2
12	(Italy) Sara Errani	6	6

==== Fourth qualifier ====
First round
4	(China) Lu Jingjing	4	6	6
(Australia) Olivia Tjandramulia	6	3	4
WC	(China) Zhang Yuxuan	6	6
11	(Canada) Gabriela Dabrowski	4	4

Qualifying competition
4	(China) Lu Jingjing	4	6	6
WC	(China) Zhang Yuxuan	6	3	3

==== Fifth qualifier ====
First round
5	(Serbia) Nina Stojanović	6	6
(China) Xu Shilin	4	3
(China) Guo Hanyu	2	7^{7}	6
9	(Slovenia) Dalila Jakupović	6	6^{4}	3

Qualifying competition
5	(Serbia) Nina Stojanović	1	6^{2}
(China) Guo Hanyu	6	7^{7}

==== Sixth qualifier ====
First round
6	(Switzerland) Stefanie Vögele	5	6	6
(China) Kang Jiaqi	7	1	1
(China) Xun Fangying	1	0
7	(China) Zhang Kailin	6	6

Qualifying competition
6	(Switzerland) Stefanie Vögele	6	6
7	(China) Zhang Kailin	0	3
