= 2016 Tianjin Open – Doubles =

Doubles
- 2016 Tianjin Open

Final
- Champions: (United States) Christina McHale (China) Peng Shuai
- Runners-up: (Poland) Magda Linette (China) Xu Yifan
- Score: 7–6^{(10–8)}, 6–0

Details
- Draw: 16
- Seeds: 4

Events
Singles	Doubles
- Tianjin Open

Xu Yifan and Zheng Saisai were the defending champions, but Zheng chose to play in Hong Kong instead.

Xu played alongside Magda Linette, but they lost in the final to Christina McHale and Peng Shuai, 6–7^{(8–10)}, 0–6.

== Seeds ==
1. (Spain) Arantxa Parra Santonja / (Australia) Anastasia Rodionova (first round)
2. (Spain) Lara Arruabarrena / (Georgia (country)) Oksana Kalashnikova (semifinals)
3. (Argentina) María Irigoyen / (Germany) Tatjana Maria (first round)
4. (United States) Christina McHale / (China) Peng Shuai (champions)

== Draw ==
Key

- Q = Qualifier
- WC = Wild card
- LL = Lucky loser
- Alt = Alternate
- ITF = ITF entry
- PR = Protected ranking
- SR = Special ranking
- SE = Special exempt
- JE = Junior exempt
- JR = Junior Accelerator Programme entrant
- CO = College Accelerator Programme entrant
- NG = Next Gen Accelerator Program entrant
- w/o = Walkover
- r = Retired
- d = Defaulted

First round
1	(Spain) A Parra Santonja (Australia) An Rodionova	2	7	[7]
(Ukraine) O Savchuk (China) Yaf Wang	6	5	[10]
(Poland) K Piter (Turkey) İ Soylu	6	6
(Georgia (country)) S Shapatava (Uzbekistan) S Sharipova	4	1
3	(Argentina) M Irigoyen (Germany) T Maria	3	3
(Poland) M Linette (China) Y Xu	6	6
(Japan) H Kuwata (Japan) A Okuno	6	3	[10]
WC	(China) J Kang (China) F Liu	0	6	[7]
(China) S Xu (China) X You	3	3
(Russia) E Rodina (China) Yan Wang	6	6
(United States) S Rogers (Thailand) V Wongteanchai	3	7^{7}	[8]
4	(United States) C McHale (China) S Peng	6	6^{5}	[10]
(China) X Han (China) K Zhang	6	1	[4]
WC	(China) X Gao (China) Y Zhang	1	6	[10]
(Japan) A Omae (Serbia) N Stojanović	0	7^{8}	[9]
2	(Spain) L Arruabarrena (Georgia (country)) O Kalashnikova	6	6^{6}	[11]

Quarterfinals
(Ukraine) O Savchuk (China) Yaf Wang	6	6
(Poland) K Piter (Turkey) İ Soylu	2	4
(Poland) M Linette (China) Y Xu	7	6
(Japan) H Kuwata (Japan) A Okuno	5	3
(Russia) E Rodina (China) Yan Wang	3	0
4	(United States) C McHale (China) S Peng	6	6
WC	(China) X Gao (China) Y Zhang	4	5
2	(Spain) L Arruabarrena (Georgia (country)) O Kalashnikova	6	7

Semifinals
(Ukraine) O Savchuk (China) Yaf Wang	5	7^{7}	[2]
(Poland) M Linette (China) Y Xu	7	6^{3}	[10]
4	(United States) C McHale (China) S Peng	6	3	[10]
2	(Spain) L Arruabarrena (Georgia (country)) O Kalashnikova	3	6	[5]

Final
(Poland) M Linette (China) Y Xu	6^{8}	0
4	(United States) C McHale (China) S Peng	7^{10}	6
