= 2017 Tianjin Open – Doubles =

Doubles
- 2017 Tianjin Open

Final
- Champions: (Romania) Irina-Camelia Begu (Italy) Sara Errani
- Runners-up: (Slovenia) Dalila Jakupović (Serbia) Nina Stojanović
- Score: 6–4, 6–3

Details
- Draw: 16
- Seeds: 4

Events
Singles	Doubles
- Tianjin Open

Christina McHale and Peng Shuai were the defending champions, but Peng chose not to participate this year. McHale played alongside Lauren Davis, but lost in the first round to Kateryna Bondarenko and Alla Kudryavtseva.

Irina-Camelia Begu and Sara Errani won the title, defeating Dalila Jakupović and Nina Stojanović in the final, 6–4, 6–3.

== Seeds ==
1. (Ukraine) Kateryna Bondarenko / (Russia) Alla Kudryavtseva (quarterfinals)
2. (Japan) Nao Hibino / (Montenegro) Danka Kovinić (quarterfinals, withdrew)
3. (Slovenia) Dalila Jakupović / (Serbia) Nina Stojanović (final)
4. (China) Liang Chen / (China) Lu Jingjing (quarterfinals)

== Draw ==
Key

- Q = Qualifier
- WC = Wild card
- LL = Lucky loser
- Alt = Alternate
- ITF = ITF entry
- PR = Protected ranking
- SR = Special ranking
- SE = Special exempt
- JE = Junior exempt
- JR = Junior Accelerator Programme entrant
- CO = College Accelerator Programme entrant
- NG = Next Gen Accelerator Program entrant
- w/o = Walkover
- r = Retired
- d = Defaulted

=== Draw ===
First round
1	(Ukraine) K Bondarenko (Russia) A Kudryavtseva	0	6	[10]
(United States) L Davis (United States) C McHale	6	2	[7]
(China) X Jiang (China) Q Tang	3	4
(Romania) I-C Begu (Italy) S Errani	6	6
4	(China) C Liang (China) Jin Lu	6	6
(Ukraine) K Kozlova (Australia) Ar Rodionova	3	3
(Belarus) A Sabalenka (China) Y Xu	6	4	[15]
(China) X Han (China) L Zhu	4	6	[13]
(China) F Xun (China) X You	6	6^{5}	[11]
(Chinese Taipei) C-j Chuang (China) Y Wang	3	7^{7}	[9]
(China) Y Duan (Poland) M Linette	2	4
3	(Slovenia) D Jakupović (Serbia) N Stojanović	6	6
(Japan) H Kuwata (India) P Thombare	3	6	[7]
(China) H Guo (China) Q Ye	6	2	[10]
(China) F Liu (Japan) K Okamura	6^{3}	3
2	(Japan) N Hibino (Montenegro) D Kovinić	7^{7}	6

Quarterfinals
1	(Ukraine) K Bondarenko (Russia) A Kudryavtseva	6^{4}	6	[6]
(Romania) I-C Begu (Italy) S Errani	7^{7}	2	[10]
4	(China) C Liang (China) Jin Lu	4	3
(Belarus) A Sabalenka (China) Y Xu	6	6
(China) F Xun (China) X You	3	6	[11]
3	(Slovenia) D Jakupović (Serbia) N Stojanović	6	1	[13]
(China) H Guo (China) Q Ye	w/o
2	(Japan) N Hibino (Montenegro) D Kovinić

Semifinals
(Romania) I-C Begu (Italy) S Errani	6	7^{7}
(Belarus) A Sabalenka (China) Y Xu	1	6^{4}
3	(Slovenia) D Jakupović (Serbia) N Stojanović	6	4	[10]
(China) H Guo (China) Q Ye	0	6	[4]

Final
(Romania) I-C Begu (Italy) S Errani	6	6
3	(Slovenia) D Jakupović (Serbia) N Stojanović	4	3
