= 2019 Tianjin Open – Doubles =

Doubles
- 2019 Tianjin Open

Final
- Champions: (Japan) Shuko Aoyama (Japan) Ena Shibahara
- Runners-up: (Japan) Nao Hibino (Japan) Miyu Kato
- Score: 6–3, 7–5

Details
- Draw: 16
- Seeds: 4

Events
Singles	Doubles
- Tianjin Open

Nicole Melichar and Květa Peschke were the defending champions, but Peschke chose not to participate. Nicole Melichar played alongside Xu Yifan, but they lost in the first round to Christina McHale and Yanina Wickmayer.

Shuko Aoyama and Ena Shibahara won the title, defeating Nao Hibino and Miyu Kato in the final, 6–3, 7–5. This was Shibahara's first WTA tour level doubles title.

== Seeds ==
1. (United States) Nicole Melichar / (China) Xu Yifan (first round)
2. (Australia) Samantha Stosur / (China) Zhang Shuai (withdrew)
3. (Croatia) Darija Jurak / (United States) Desirae Krawczyk (quarterfinals)
4. (China) Duan Yingying / (China) Peng Shuai (semifinals)

== Draw ==
Key

- Q = Qualifier
- WC = Wild card
- LL = Lucky loser
- Alt = Alternate
- ITF = ITF entry
- PR = Protected ranking
- SR = Special ranking
- SE = Special exempt
- JE = Junior exempt
- JR = Junior Accelerator Programme entrant
- CO = College Accelerator Programme entrant
- NG = Next Gen Accelerator Program entrant
- w/o = Walkover
- r = Retired
- d = Defaulted

=== Draw ===
First round
1	(United States) N Melichar (China) Y Xu	2	4
(United States) C McHale (Belgium) Y Wickmayer	6	6
(Japan) N Hibino (Japan) M Kato	6	6
PR	(Ukraine) K Bondarenko (Australia) Ar Rodionova	0	0
4	(China) Y Duan (China) S Peng	w/o
(China) Xin Wang (China) F Xun
(China) X Jiang (China) Q Tang	1	7^{7}	[6]
(Australia) M Adamczak (Australia) S Sanders	6	6^{2}	[10]
(United Kingdom) H Dart (United Kingdom) H Watson	6	4	[2]
(China) X Han (China) L Zhu	4	6	[10]
WC	(Hong Kong) K-y Ng (China) S Zheng	0	2
3	(Croatia) D Jurak (United States) D Krawczyk	6	6
(Georgia (country)) S Shapatava (United Kingdom) E Webley-Smith	2	2
(China) Y Wang (China) Z Yang	6	6
(Japan) S Aoyama (Japan) E Shibahara	6	4	[10]
Alt	(China) S Xu (China) X You	3	6	[7]

Quarterfinals
(United States) C McHale (Belgium) Y Wickmayer
(Japan) N Hibino (Japan) M Kato	w/o
4	(China) Y Duan (China) S Peng	6	6
(Australia) M Adamczak (Australia) S Sanders	4	1
(China) X Han (China) L Zhu	6	6
3	(Croatia) D Jurak (United States) D Krawczyk	0	4
(China) Y Wang (China) Z Yang	7	4	[12]
(Japan) S Aoyama (Japan) E Shibahara	5	6	[14]

Semifinals
(Japan) N Hibino (Japan) M Kato	6	1	[10]
4	(China) Y Duan (China) S Peng	4	6	[7]
(China) X Han (China) L Zhu	1	6	[5]
(Japan) S Aoyama (Japan) E Shibahara	6	4	[10]

Final
(Japan) N Hibino (Japan) M Kato	3	5
(Japan) S Aoyama (Japan) E Shibahara	6	7
