= 2014 Tianjin Open – Singles =

Singles
- 2014 Tianjin Open

Final
- Champion: (United States) Alison Riske
- Runner-up: (Switzerland) Belinda Bencic
- Score: 6–3, 6–4

Details
- Draw: 32
- Seeds: 8

Events
Singles	Doubles
- Tianjin Open

Alison Riske won the first edition of the tournament, defeating Belinda Bencic in the final, 6–3, 6–4.

== Seeds ==
1. (Serbia) Jelena Janković (second round)
2. (China) Peng Shuai (semifinals, retired due to a lower back injury)
3. (Switzerland) Belinda Bencic (final)
4. (United States) Varvara Lepchenko (quarterfinals)
5. (China) Zhang Shuai (second round)
6. (United States) Alison Riske (champion)
7. (Puerto Rico) Monica Puig (first round)
8. (Croatia) Ajla Tomljanović (quarterfinals)

== Draw ==
Key

- Q = Qualifier
- WC = Wild card
- LL = Lucky loser
- Alt = Alternate
- ITF = ITF entry
- PR = Protected ranking
- SR = Special ranking
- SE = Special exempt
- JE = Junior exempt
- JR = Junior Accelerator Programme entrant
- CO = College Accelerator Programme entrant
- NG = Next Gen Accelerator Program entrant
- w/o = Walkover
- r = Retired
- d = Defaulted

=== Finals ===
Semifinals
(China) Zheng Saisai	0	1
6	(United States) Alison Riske	6	6
3	(Switzerland) Belinda Bencic	3
2	(China) Peng Shuai	1^{r}

Final
6	(United States) Alison Riske	6	6
3	(Switzerland) Belinda Bencic	3	4

=== Top half ===
First round
1	(Serbia) J Janković	6	0	6
(Russia) A Kudryavtseva	2	6	0
(Hungary) T Babos	5	4
(China) S Zheng	7	6
(Romania) S Cîrstea	6	6
(Poland) M Linette	4	2
(Czech Republic) A Hlaváčková	7	6
7	(Puerto Rico) M Puig	5	1
4	(United States) V Lepchenko	6	6
Q	(Ukraine) L Kichenok	1	0
WC	(China) F Liu	6	6
(China) Q Wang	3	0
(Belarus) O Govortsova	7	6
WC	(Italy) F Schiavone	5	4
(Turkey) Ç Büyükakçay	2	5
6	(United States) A Riske	6	7

Second round
1	(Serbia) J Janković	3	3
(China) S Zheng	6	6
(Romania) S Cîrstea	6	6
(Czech Republic) A Hlaváčková	3	0
4	(United States) V Lepchenko	7^{7}	7
WC	(China) F Liu	6^{3}	5
(Belarus) O Govortsova	4	6^{3}
6	(United States) A Riske	6	7^{7}

Quarterfinals
(China) S Zheng	6	2	6
(Romania) S Cîrstea	4	6	1
4	(United States) V Lepchenko	6^{5}	3
6	(United States) A Riske	7^{7}	6

Semifinals
(China) S Zheng	0	1
6	(United States) A Riske	6	6

=== Bottom half ===
First round
5	(China) S Zhang	6	6
(Montenegro) D Kovinić	2	1
(Australia) An Rodionova	1	1
(Chinese Taipei) S-w Hsieh	6	6
WC	(Hong Kong) H-c Wu	0	0
(Switzerland) R Oprandi	6	6
(China) L Zhu	5	2
3	(Switzerland) B Bencic	7	6
8	(Croatia) A Tomljanović	5	6	6
Q	(Ukraine) N Kichenok	7	1	2
(China) Y Duan	6	6
(Hong Kong) L Zhang	3	1
(Spain) S Soler Espinosa	6^{6}	6	1
Q	(Russia) E Kulichkova	7^{8}	4	6
Q	(Israel) S Pe'er	5	6	2
2	(China) S Peng	7	4	6

Second round
5	(China) S Zhang	6	3	6^{5}
(Chinese Taipei) S-w Hsieh	3	6	7^{7}
(Switzerland) R Oprandi
3	(Switzerland) B Bencic	w/o
8	(Croatia) A Tomljanović	6	6
(China) Y Duan	4	4
Q	(Russia) E Kulichkova	1	2
2	(China) S Peng	6	6

Quarterfinals
(Chinese Taipei) S-w Hsieh	4	6	2
3	(Switzerland) B Bencic	6	4	6
8	(Croatia) A Tomljanović	6^{5}	6	5
2	(China) S Peng	7^{7}	2	7

Semifinals
3	(Switzerland) B Bencic	3
2	(China) S Peng	1^{r}

== Qualifying ==
=== Seeds ===
1. (Israel) Shahar Pe'er (qualified)
2. (Ukraine) Lyudmyla Kichenok (qualified)
3. (Ukraine) Nadiia Kichenok (qualified)
4. (Russia) Elizaveta Kulichkova (qualified)
5. (China) Zhang Kailin (second round)
6. (Russia) Marina Melnikova (first round)
7. (China) Xu Yifan (qualifying competition)
8. (China) Han Xinyun (qualifying competition)

=== Qualifiers ===
1. (Israel) Shahar Pe'er
2. (Ukraine) Lyudmyla Kichenok
3. (Ukraine) Nadiia Kichenok
4. (Russia) Elizaveta Kulichkova

=== Draw ===
==== First qualifier ====
First round
WC	(China) Kang Jiaqi	6	1	2
(China) Xu Shilin	4	6	6
WC	(Slovenia) Andreja Klepač	6	6
(Chinese Taipei) Chan Chin-wei	4	3
WC	(Japan) Naoko Eto	1	0
5	(China) Zhang Kailin	6	6

Second round
1/Alt	(Israel) Shahar Pe'er	6	6
(China) Xu Shilin	4	4
WC	(Slovenia) Andreja Klepač	6	6
5	(China) Zhang Kailin	3	3

Qualifying competition
1/Alt	(Israel) Shahar Pe'er	4	6	6
WC	(Slovenia) Andreja Klepač	6	4	2

==== Second qualifier ====
First round
WC	(China) Liang Chen	7^{9}	1	6
(Czech Republic) Barbora Štefková	6^{7}	6	4
Alt	(Chinese Taipei) Chuang Chia-jung	5	1
(China) Yang Zhaoxuan	7	6
(Russia) Anastasia Pivovarova	6^{7}	6	6
6	(Russia) Marina Melnikova	7^{9}	2	1

Second round
2/Alt	(Ukraine) Lyudmyla Kichenok	6	6
WC	(China) Liang Chen	2	2
(China) Yang Zhaoxuan	6^{0}	2
(Russia) Anastasia Pivovarova	7^{7}	6

Qualifying competition
2/Alt	(Ukraine) Lyudmyla Kichenok	6	4	7
(Russia) Anastasia Pivovarova	3	6	5

==== Third qualifier ====
First round
(China) Zhang Yuxuan	6	3	6
WC	(China) Li Yixuan	1	6	3
(Chinese Taipei) Hsu Wen-hsin	6	6
WC	(Chinese Taipei) Hsieh Shu-ying	1	3
(Hungary) Vanda Lukács	0	1
8	(China) Han Xinyun	6	6

Second round
3/Alt	(Ukraine) Nadiia Kichenok	6	6
(China) Zhang Yuxuan	3	2
(Chinese Taipei) Hsu Wen-hsin	4	3
8	(China) Han Xinyun	6	6

Qualifying competition
3/Alt	(Ukraine) Nadiia Kichenok	6	7^{7}
8	(China) Han Xinyun	3	6^{1}

==== Fourth qualifier ====
First round
WC	(China) Yu Yuanyi	2	3
(China) Tian Ran	6	6
Alt	(Spain) Arantxa Parra Santonja	6	6
(China) Hu Yueyue	2	0
(France) Fiona Ferro	3	4
7	(China) Xu Yifan	6	6

Second round
4	(Russia) Elizaveta Kulichkova	6	6
(China) Tian Ran	3	4
Alt	(Spain) Arantxa Parra Santonja	4	0
7	(China) Xu Yifan	6	6

Qualifying competition
4	(Russia) Elizaveta Kulichkova	6	6
7	(China) Xu Yifan	4	1
