= 2019 Tianjin Open – Singles =

Singles
- 2019 Tianjin Open

Final
- Champion: (Sweden) Rebecca Peterson
- Runner-up: (United Kingdom) Heather Watson
- Score: 6–4, 6–4

Details
- Draw: 32
- Seeds: 8

Events
Singles	Doubles
- Tianjin Open

Caroline Garcia was the defending champion, but lost in the second round to Wang Yafan.

Rebecca Peterson won the title, defeating Heather Watson in the final, 6–4, 6–4.

== Seeds ==
1. (United States) Sofia Kenin (withdrew)
2. (China) Wang Qiang (second round)
3. (Ukraine) Dayana Yastremska (quarterfinals)
4. (France) Caroline Garcia (second round)
5. (China) Zhang Shuai (withdrew)
6. (Kazakhstan) Yulia Putintseva (quarterfinals)
7. (China) Zheng Saisai (second round, retired)
8. (Poland) Magda Linette (quarterfinals)

== Draw ==
Key

- Q = Qualifier
- WC = Wild card
- LL = Lucky loser
- Alt = Alternate
- ITF = ITF entry
- PR = Protected ranking
- SR = Special ranking
- SE = Special exempt
- JE = Junior exempt
- JR = Junior Accelerator Programme entrant
- CO = College Accelerator Programme entrant
- NG = Next Gen Accelerator Program entrant
- w/o = Walkover
- r = Retired
- d = Defaulted

=== Finals ===
Semifinals
(Tunisia) Ons Jabeur	6	4	5
(Sweden) Rebecca Peterson	0	6	7
(Russia) Veronika Kudermetova	1	4
(United Kingdom) Heather Watson	6	6

Final
(Sweden) Rebecca Peterson	6	6
(United Kingdom) Heather Watson	4	4

=== Top half ===
First round
Q	(China) Xiy Wang	6	7^{7}
(United States) K Ahn	2	6^{2}
(Tunisia) O Jabeur	6	6
(United States) J Brady	4	2
WC	(Australia) S Stosur	7	2	6
WC	(China) Z Yang	5	6	2
(Australia) A Sharma	1	6	5
6	(Kazakhstan) Y Putintseva	6	1	7
4	(France) C Garcia	2	6	6
(Russia) A Potapova	6	2	2
(China) Y Wang	6	6
(United States) L Davis	0	4
(United States) V Williams	3	6	3
(Sweden) R Peterson	6	4	6
LL	(China) Xin Wang	6	6
LL	(China) S Ma	3	1

Second round
Q	(China) Xiy Wang	4	2
(Tunisia) O Jabeur	6	6
WC	(Australia) S Stosur	1	2
6	(Kazakhstan) Y Putintseva	6	6
4	(France) C Garcia	4	2
(China) Y Wang	6	6
(Sweden) R Peterson	7	3
LL	(China) Xin Wang	5	2^{r}

Quarterfinals
(Tunisia) O Jabeur	7^{7}	7^{7}
6	(Kazakhstan) Y Putintseva	6^{5}	6^{4}
(China) Y Wang	7^{7}	4	2
(Sweden) R Peterson	6^{5}	6	6

Semifinals
(Tunisia) O Jabeur	6	4	5
(Sweden) R Peterson	0	6	7

=== Bottom half ===
First round
7	(China) S Zheng	7^{7}	6
WC	(China) Y Duan	6^{4}	2
(Russia) V Kudermetova	6	6
(Australia) A Tomljanović	4	2
(China) S Peng	6	7^{7}
Q	(China) X You	2	6^{1}
(China) L Zhu	2	3
3	(Ukraine) D Yastremska	6	6
8	(Poland) M Linette	6	6
(United States) C McHale	3	1
Q	(Japan) K Nara	3	6	6
(United Kingdom) H Dart	6	1	3
(United Kingdom) H Watson	6	7^{7}
PR	(Ukraine) K Bondarenko	4	6^{3}
Q	(Australia) Ar Rodionova	3	4
2	(China) Q Wang	6	6

Second round
7	(China) S Zheng	0^{r}
(Russia) V Kudermetova	5
(China) S Peng	2	4
3	(Ukraine) D Yastremska	6	6
8	(Poland) M Linette	4
Q	(Japan) K Nara	0^{r}
(United Kingdom) H Watson	6	6
2	(China) Q Wang	3	0

Quarterfinals
(Russia) V Kudermetova	6	6
3	(Ukraine) D Yastremska	4	0
8	(Poland) M Linette	5	7^{7}	6^{6}
(United Kingdom) H Watson	7	6^{4}	7^{8}

Semifinals
(Russia) V Kudermetova	1	4
(United Kingdom) H Watson	6	6

== Qualifying ==
=== Seeds ===
1. (Japan) Nao Hibino (second round)
2. (China) Han Xinyun (withdrew)
3. (Belgium) Yanina Wickmayer (second round)
4. (China) Wang Xiyu (qualified)
5. (China) Wang Xinyu (qualifying competition, lucky loser)
6. (Japan) Kurumi Nara (qualified)
7. (Serbia) Natalija Kostić (second round)
8. (Chinese Taipei) Liang En-shuo (second round, retired)

=== Qualifiers ===
1. (Australia) Arina Rodionova
2. (Japan) Kurumi Nara
3. (China) You Xiaodi
4. (China) Wang Xiyu

=== Lucky losers ===
1. (China) Wang Xinyu
2. (China) Ma Shuyue

=== Draw ===
==== First qualifier ====
First round
1	(Japan) Nao Hibino	6	6
(China) Liu Fangzhou	2	3
(Japan) Haruka Kaji	6	1	2
(Australia) Arina Rodionova	3	6	6
(China) Guo Hanyu	2	5
(China) Zhang Yuxuan	6	7
(Japan) Ayano Shimizu	6	2	2
8	(Chinese Taipei) Liang En-shuo	3	6	6

Second round
1	(Japan) Nao Hibino	6	3	5
(Australia) Arina Rodionova	3	6	7
(China) Zhang Yuxuan	6	4
8	(Chinese Taipei) Liang En-shuo	2	2^{r}

Qualifying competition
(Australia) Arina Rodionova	6^{2}	6	6
(China) Zhang Yuxuan	7^{7}	1	4

==== Second qualifier ====
First round
Alt	(Croatia) Darija Jurak	3	0
(China) Ma Shuyue	6	6
WC	(China) Tang Qianhui	4	3
(China) Zheng Qinwen	6	6
(United States) Nicole Melichar	6	3	6
(Serbia) Jovana Jakšić	1	6	3
(China) Wang Meiling	0	2
6	(Japan) Kurumi Nara	6	6

Second round
(China) Ma Shuyue	1	6	7
(China) Zheng Qinwen	6	2	5
(United States) Nicole Melichar	4	4
6	(Japan) Kurumi Nara	6	6

Qualifying competition
(China) Ma Shuyue	6^{7}	3
6	(Japan) Kurumi Nara	7^{9}	6

==== Third qualifier ====
First round
3	(Belgium) Yanina Wickmayer	6	6
(Georgia (country)) Sofia Shapatava	1	1
(China) Xu Shilin	0	1
(China) You Xiaodi	6	6
(China) Xun Fangying	7^{7}	6
WC	(China) Jiang Xinyu	6^{3}	1
(China) Yuan Yue	3	6	3
7	(Serbia) Natalija Kostić	6	3	6

Second round
3	(Belgium) Yanina Wickmayer	6^{3}	4
(China) You Xiaodi	7^{7}	6
(China) Xun Fangying	7	6
7	(Serbia) Natalija Kostić	5	4

Qualifying competition
(China) You Xiaodi	6	7^{7}
(China) Xun Fangying	2	6^{5}

==== Fourth qualifier ====
First round
4	(China) Wang Xiyu	7^{7}	7
(China) Sun Ziyue	6^{5}	5
(United Kingdom) Emily Webley-Smith	4	6	3
(China) Yang Yidi	6	4	6
(China) Gao Xinyu	6	6
WC	(China) Bai Zhuoxuan	3	1
(Canada) Gabriela Dabrowski	2	4
5	(China) Wang Xinyu	6	6

Second round
4	(China) Wang Xiyu	6	6
(China) Yang Yidi	2	0
(China) Gao Xinyu	3	4
5	(China) Wang Xinyu	6	6

Qualifying competition
4	(China) Wang Xiyu	6	6
5	(China) Wang Xinyu	3	2
