= Ena Shibahara =

Japanese tennis player (born 1998)

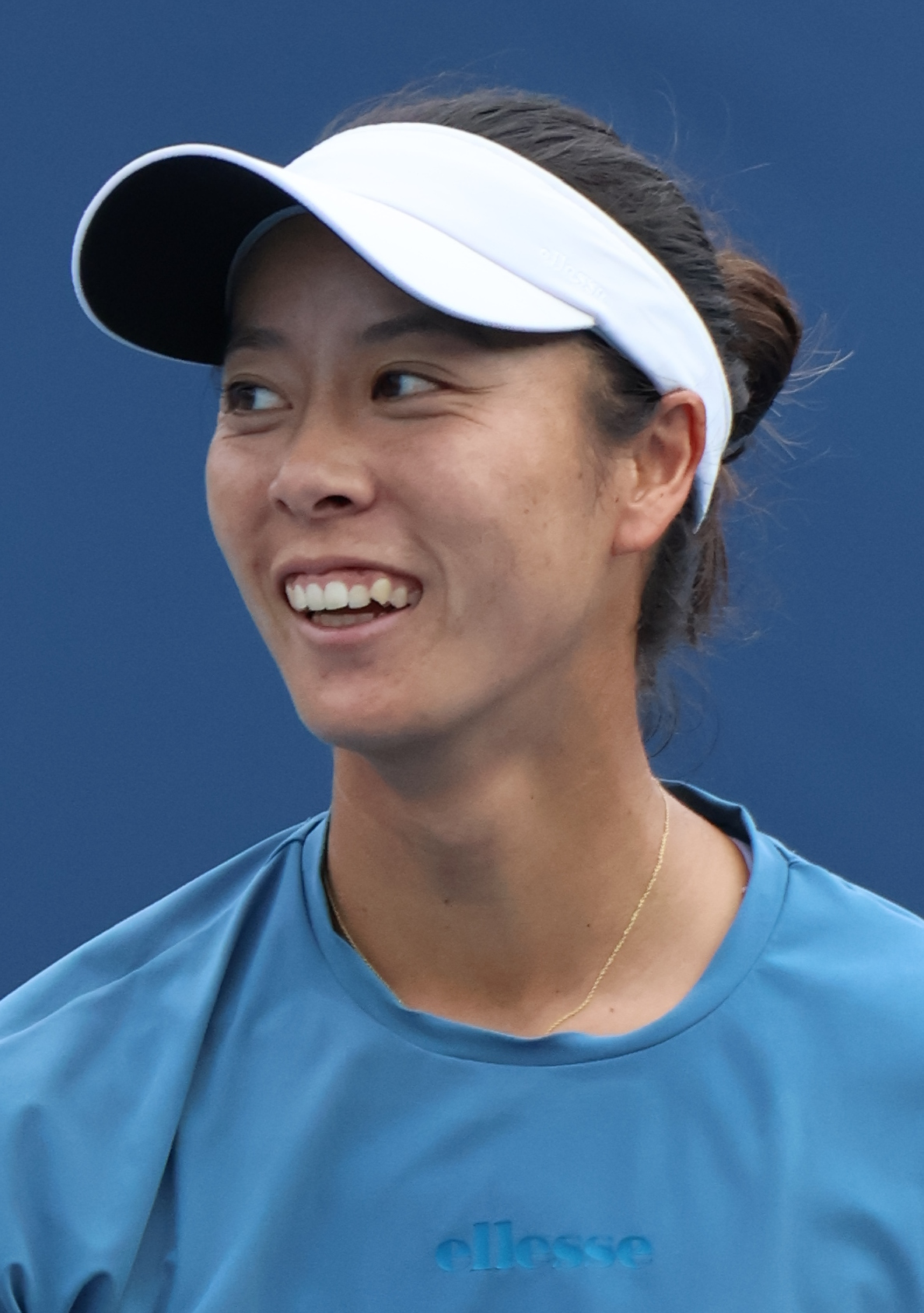
- Shibahara at the 2024 US Open
- Country (sports): United States (2014–2019); Japan (2019–current)
- Residence: Rancho Palos Verdes, California, US
- Born: February 12, 1998 (age 28) Mountain View, California
- Height: 1.70 m (5 ft 7 in)
- Turned pro: 2018
- Plays: Right-handed (two-handed backhand)
- College: UCLA
- Prize money: US$ 2,610,949

Singles
- Career record: 166–131
- Career titles: 1 ITF
- Highest ranking: No. 116 (14 July 2025)
- Current ranking: No. 580 (28 September 2026)

Grand Slam singles results
- Australian Open: Q1 (2025, 2026)
- French Open: Q2 (2025)
- Wimbledon: Q3 (2025)
- US Open: 2R (2024)

Doubles
- Career record: 235–136
- Career titles: 11
- Highest ranking: No. 4 (21 March 2022)
- Current ranking: No. 76 (28 September 2026)

Grand Slam doubles results
- Australian Open: F (2023)
- French Open: QF (2020)
- Wimbledon: SF (2021)
- US Open: 3R (2021, 2022)

Other doubles tournaments
- Tour Finals: SF (2021)
- Olympic Games: 2R (2024)

Mixed doubles
- Career titles: 1

Grand Slam mixed doubles results
- Australian Open: QF (2022)
- French Open: W (2022)
- Wimbledon: QF (2024)
- US Open: SF (2023)

Other mixed doubles tournaments
- Olympic Games: QF (2024)

Team competitions
- Fed Cup: 12–3
Medal record
Women's tennis
Representing Japan
Asian Games
Gold medal – first place	2026 Aichi–Nagoya	Mixed doubles
- Last updated on: 29 September 2026.

Ena Shibahara (柴原 瑛菜, Shibahara Ena; born 12 February 1998) is an American-born Japanese professional tennis player. She reached her career-high rankings of world No. 4 in doubles on 21 March 2022 and No. 116 in singles on 14 July 2025. She won her first major title at the 2022 French Open, alongside Wesley Koolhof in mixed doubles. Partnering with Shuko Aoyama, she reached the final at the 2023 Australian Open, in addition to the semifinals at the 2021 Wimbledon Championships, the 2022 and 2026 Australian Opens, and at the 2021 WTA Finals.

Shibahara has won eleven doubles titles on the WTA Tour, including two WTA 1000, the 2021 Miami Open and the 2023 Canadian Open.

She made her Billie Jean King Cup debut for Japan in 2020, and also participated in the 2020 Olympic Games in Tokyo. Until July 2019, Shibahara represented her country of birth, the United States.

== College ==
In 2016, she graduated from Palos Verdes Peninsula High School and attended UCLA before turning pro after her sophomore season.

== Professional ==
=== 2016: Major debut ===
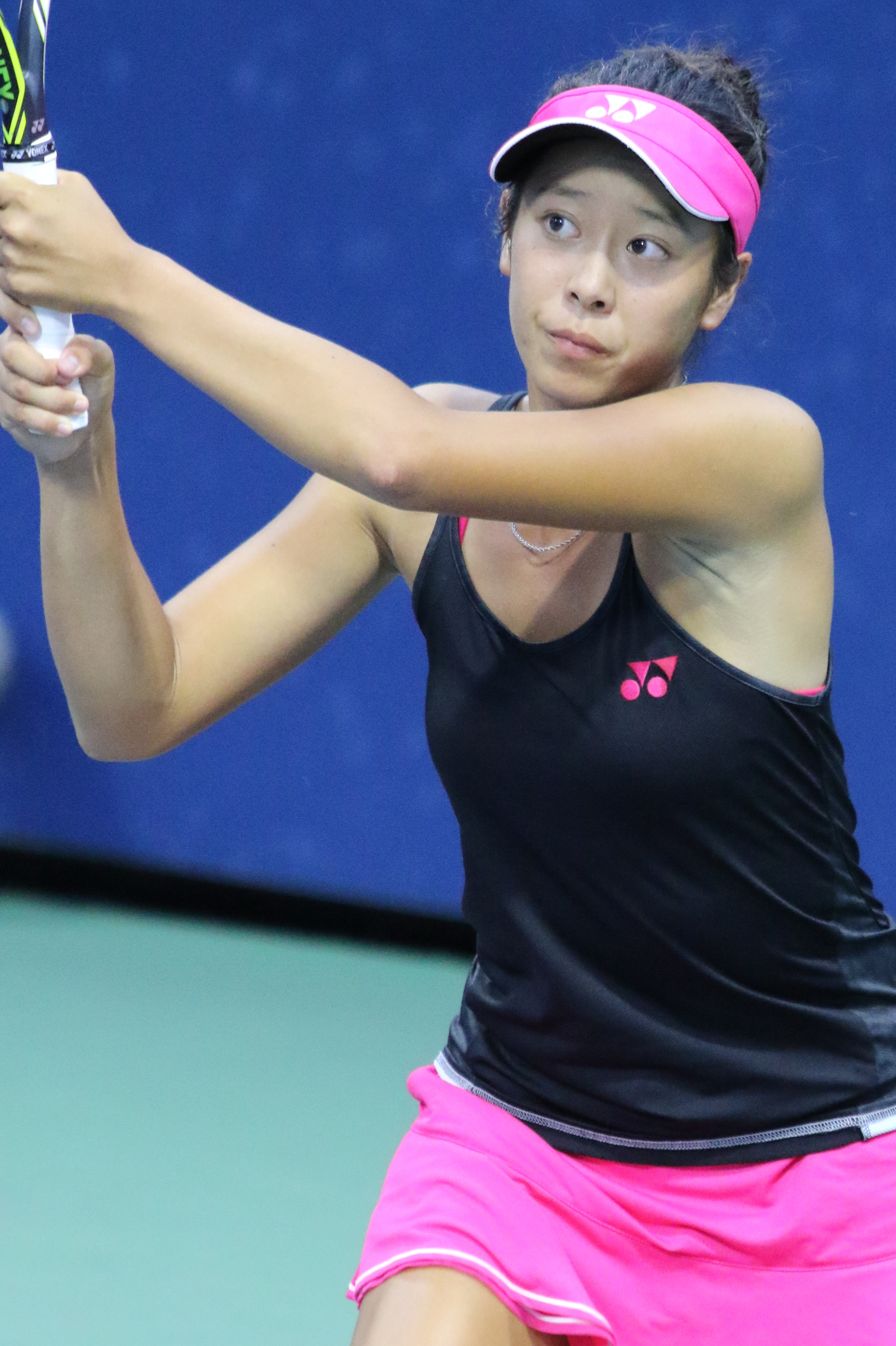
Shibahara at the 2016 US Open

Shibahara made her major main-draw debut at the US Open in the doubles event, partnering with Jada Hart as wildcard entrants, where they lost to seventh seeds Sania Mirza and Barbora Strýcová in the first round. Later in the tournament, Shibahara and Hart won the girls' doubles title.

=== 2019: Doubles focus, Aoyama partnership ===
Shibahara played her first five doubles tournaments of the year with Hayley Carter winning two titles and reaching another final. This raised her ranking from No. 205 to an entry into the top 100, with a doubles ranking of world No. 98 on May 20.

Shibahara then played tournaments with eight other partners, before playing her first tournament with Shuko Aoyama in August at the Silicon Valley Classic in San Jose, where they reached the final. Shibahara said, "Our chemistry was spot on from the beginning, where I would set her up from the baseline and she just moves all over the net".

Shibahara and Aoyama played five more tournaments together in 2019, winning their first two titles at the Tianjin Open (Shibahara's first WTA Tour-level title) and Kremlin Cup in Moscow. By the end of the year, Shibahara's WTA doubles ranking was world No. 31.

In singles, she started the year playing a mixture of ITF and WTA Challenger tournaments. Following a quarterfinal result at the 100k Vancouver Open, her singles ranking reached a career-high of world No. 416, on 19 August 2019.

=== 2020–2021: WTA 1000 title & WTA Finals semis ===
Shibahara reached the 2020 French Open quarterfinals, partnering Aoyama. Shibahara won her maiden WTA 1000 title at the 2021 Miami Open with Aoyama. The Japanese pair represented Japan at the 2020 Summer Olympics, where they lost in the first round to eventual silver medalists Belinda Bencic and Viktorija Golubic. Shinahara also reached the semifinals at Wimbledon and of the WTA Finals, seeded No. 2. She won four more titles, three being at the WTA 500 level, during 2021 with Aoyama. In singles, Shibahara also made her WTA Tour-level main draw debut in Cleveland as a lucky loser but lost to Bethanie Mattek-Sands.

=== 2022: French mixed title, doubles No. 4 ===
At the Australian Open, she reached the semifinals of a major for the second time in her career, partnering again with Shuko Aoyama. Later, she set a new career-high ranking of No. 4, on 21 March 2022, after making the Indian Wells Open final where she partnered with Asia Muhammad.

At the French Open, she won the first major title of her career in mixed doubles, partnering with Wesley Koolhof. She became the first Japanese player in 25 years to win the mixed doubles championship in Paris, since Rika Hiraki and Mahesh Bhupathi took home the title in 1997.

=== 2023: Australian doubles final, Canada doubles title ===
At the Australian Open, she reached the semifinals of a major for the third time in her career, partnering again with Shuko Aoyama. The pair defeated second-seeded pair of Coco Gauff and Jessica Pegula to reach their first Grand Slam tournament final. However, they were defeated in straight sets by defending champions, Krejčíková and Siniaková.

She won her ninth title at the Rosmalen Open and her first WTA 1000 title at the Canadian Open, partnering Aoyama.

She qualified for the singles main draw of the WTA 1000 Guadalajara Open but lost to Karolína Plíšková. In doubles, the pair Shibahara and Aoyama qualified for the WTA Finals for the second time with a seeding of No. 3 but lost in the round robin stage.

=== 2024–2026: US Open singles debut ===
After entering the main draw at the 2024 Prague Open as a lucky loser, Shibahara won her first WTA Tour singles match defeating Tamara Korpatsch, in three sets, her second career victory over a top 100 player. She also made her Grand Slam tournament singles debut at the 2024 US Open, after qualifying into the main draw. She recorded her first singles win at a major over Australian Daria Saville, before losing to world No. 1, Iga Świątek in the second round, in straight sets. She also qualified for the main draw at the WTA 500 Guadalajara Open for the second time and defeated another Australian and fellow qualifier, Kimberly Birrell, for her second WTA Tour win.

She won her 11th doubles title at the 2024 Japan Women's Open in Osaka, partnering Laura Siegemund. Shibahara and Siegemund ended runners-up at the Pan Pacific Open, losing to Shuko Aoyama and Eri Hozumi in the final.

At the 2025 ATX Open, Shibahara qualified for the main draw and reached her first singles tour-level quarterfinal defeating Kaja Juvan and again Kimberly Birrell. As a result, she returned to world No. 134 in the singles rankings on 3 March 2025. She also qualified for a consecutive year at the 2025 US Open in singles.

In doubles at the 2026 Australian Open she reached the semifinals with Vera Zvonareva.

== Performance timelines ==
Key
W	F	SF	QF	#R	RR	Q#	P#	DNQ	A	Z#	PO	G	S	B	NMS	NTI	P	NH

(W) winner; (F) finalist; (SF) semifinalist; (QF) quarterfinalist; (#R) rounds 4, 3, 2, 1; (RR) round-robin stage; (Q#) qualification round; (P#) preliminary round; (DNQ) did not qualify; (A) absent; (Z#) Davis/Fed Cup Zonal Group (with number indication) or (PO) play-off; (G) gold, (S) silver or (B) bronze Olympic/Paralympic medal; (NMS) not a Masters tournament; (NTI) not a Tier I tournament; (P) postponed; (NH) not held; (SR) strike rate (events won / competed); (W–L) win–loss record.
To avoid confusion and double counting, these charts are updated at the conclusion of a tournament or when the player's participation has ended.

Only main-draw results in WTA Tour, Grand Slam tournaments, Billie Jean King Cup and Olympic Games are included in win–loss records and career statistics.

=== Doubles ===
Current through the 2023 Indian Wells Open.

Tournament	2016	...	2019	2020	2021	2022	2023	2024	2025	2026	SR	W–L	Win%
Grand Slam tournaments
Australian Open	A		A	3R	QF	SF	F	3R	2R	SF	0 / 7	21–7	75%
French Open	A		A	QF	2R	3R	2R	3R	1R	A	0 / 6	9–6	60%
Wimbledon	A		A	NH	SF	3R	1R	3R	1R	A	0 / 5	8–5	62%
US Open	1R		1R	2R	3R	3R	1R	2R	2R	2R	0 / 9	8–9	47%
Win–loss	0–1		0–1	5–3	10–4	10–4	6–4	7–4	3–4	5–2	0 / 27	46–27	63%
National representation
Summer Olympics	A	NH			1R	NH					0 / 1	0–1	0%
Year-end championships
WTA Finals	DNQ			NH	SF	DNQ					0 / 1	2–2	50%
WTA 1000 tournaments
Dubai / Qatar Opens (Note: The first Premier 5 event of the year has switched back and forth between the Dubai Tennis Championships and the Qatar Ladies Open since 2009. Dubai was classified as a Premier 5 event from 2009 to 2011 before being succeeded by Doha for the 2012–2014 period. In 2015, Dubai regained its Premier 5 status while Doha was demoted to Premier status. The Premier 5 tournaments were reclassified as WTA 1000 tournaments in 2021.)	A		A	1R	2R	QF	A			A	0 / 3	1–3	25%
Indian Wells Open	A		A	NH	SF	F	SF	SF	1R	A	0 / 5	12–5	71%
Miami Open	A	A	A	NH	W	2R	1R	A	A	A	1 / 3	5–2	71%
Madrid Open	A	A	A	NH	1R	A	1R	A	A	A	0 / 2	0–2	0%
Italian Open	A		A	SF	SF	A	QF	A	A	A	0 / 3	7–3	70%
Canadian Open	A	A	A	NH	2R	2R	W	A	A	A	1 / 3	6–2	75%
Cincinnati Open	A	A	A	2R	QF	2R	1R	A	1R	A	0 / 5	2–5	29%
Guadalajara Open	NH					A	2R	A	A		0 / 1	0–1	0%
Wuhan Open	A		1R	NH				A	A		0 / 1	0–1	0%
China Open	A		SF	NH			1R	A	A		0 / 2	3–2	60%
Career statistics
Tournaments	1		12	11	21	17	17				Career total: 74		
Titles	0		2	1	5	0	2				Career total: 10		
Finals	0		4	1	5	1	4				Career total: 15		
Overall win–loss	0–1		22–10	17–10	39–17	30–16	29–24				10 / 74	137–78	64%
Win %	0%		69%	63%	70%	65%	55%				64%		
Year-end ranking	1061		31	23	5	22	14	41	115		$2,610,949		

=== Mixed doubles ===
Tournaments	2021	2022	2023	2024	SR	W–L	Win%
Australian Open	2R	QF	1R	2R	0 / 4	4–4	50%
French Open	A	W	1R	2R	1 / 3	6–2	75%
Wimbledon	2R	2R	2R	QF	0 / 4	5–4	56%
US Open	2R	QF	SF	A	0 / 3	6–3	67%
Win–loss	3–3	10–3	4–4	4–3	1 / 14	21–13	62%

== Grand Slam tournament finals ==
=== Women's doubles: 1 (runner-up) ===
Result	Year	Tournament	Surface	Partner	Opponents	Score
Loss	2023	Australian Open	Hard	(Japan) Shuko Aoyama	(Czech Republic) Barbora Krejčíková (Czech Republic) Kateřina Siniaková	4–6, 3–6

=== Mixed doubles: 1 (title) ===
Result	Year	Tournament	Surface	Partner	Opponents	Score
Win	2022	French Open	Clay	(Netherlands) Wesley Koolhof	(Norway) Ulrikke Eikeri (Belgium) Joran Vliegen	7–6^{(7–5)}, 6–2

== Other significant finals ==
=== WTA 1000 tournaments ===
==== Doubles: 3 (2 titles, 1 runner-up) ====
Result	Date	Tournament	Surface	Partner	Opponents	Score
Win	2021	Miami Open	Hard	(Japan) Shuko Aoyama	(United States) Hayley Carter (Brazil) Luisa Stefani	6–2, 7–5
Loss	2022	Indian Wells Open	Hard	(United States) Asia Muhammad	(China) Xu Yifan (China) Yang Zhaoxuan	5–7, 6–7^{(4–7)}
Win	2023	Canadian Open	Hard	(Japan) Shuko Aoyama	(United States) Desirae Krawczyk (Netherlands) Demi Schuurs	6–4, 4–6, [13–11]

== WTA Tour finals ==
=== Doubles: 19 (11 titles, 8 runner-ups) ===
Legend Grand Slam (0–1) WTA 1000 (2–1) WTA 500 (5–4) WTA 250 (4–2)	Finals by surface Hard (9–5) Clay (0–2) Grass (2–1)	Finals by setting Outdoor (9–8) Indoor (2–0)

Result	W–L	Date	Tournament	Tier	Surface	Partner	Opponents	Score
Loss	0–1	Apr 2019	Copa Colsanitas, Colombia	International (Note: The WTA International tournaments were reclassified as WTA 250 tournaments in 2021.)	Clay	(United States) Hayley Carter	(Australia) Zoe Hives (Australia) Astra Sharma	1–6, 2–6
Loss	0–2	Aug 2019	Silicon Valley Classic, US	Premier (Note: The WTA Premier tournaments were reclassified as WTA 500 tournaments in 2021.)	Hard	(Japan) Shuko Aoyama	(United States) Nicole Melichar (Czech Republic) Květa Peschke	4–6, 4–6
Win	1–2	Oct 2019	Tianjin Open, China	International	Hard	(Japan) Shuko Aoyama	(Japan) Nao Hibino (Japan) Miyu Kato	6–3, 7–5
Win	2–2	Oct 2019	Kremlin Cup, Russia	Premier	Hard (i)	(Japan) Shuko Aoyama	(Belgium) Kirsten Flipkens (United States) Bethanie Mattek-Sands	6–2, 6–1
Win	3–2	Feb 2020	St. Petersburg Trophy, Russia	Premier	Hard (i)	(Japan) Shuko Aoyama	(United States) Kaitlyn Christian (Chile) Alexa Guarachi	4–6, 6–0, [10–3]
Win	4–2	Jan 2021	Abu Dhabi Open, UAE	WTA 500	Hard	(Japan) Shuko Aoyama	(United States) Hayley Carter (Brazil) Luisa Stefani	7–6^{(5)}, 6–4
Win	5–2	Feb 2021	Yarra Valley Classic, Australia	WTA 500	Hard	(Japan) Shuko Aoyama	(Russia) Anna Kalinskaya (Slovakia) Viktória Kužmová	6–3, 6–4
Win	6–2	Apr 2021	Miami Open, US	WTA 1000	Hard	(Japan) Shuko Aoyama	(United States) Hayley Carter (Brazil) Luisa Stefani	6–2, 7–5
Win	7–2	Jun 2021	Eastbourne International, UK	WTA 500	Grass	(Japan) Shuko Aoyama	(United States) Nicole Melichar (Netherlands) Demi Schuurs	6–1, 6–4
Win	8–2	Aug 2021	Tennis in Cleveland, US	WTA 250	Hard	(Japan) Shuko Aoyama	(United States) Christina McHale (India) Sania Mirza	7–5, 6–3
Loss	8–3	Mar 2022	Indian Wells Open, US	WTA 1000	Hard	(United States) Asia Muhammad	(China) Xu Yifan (China) Yang Zhaoxuan	5–7, 6–7^{(4)}
Loss	8–4	Jan 2023	Australian Open, Australia	Grand Slam	Hard	(Japan) Shuko Aoyama	(Czech Republic) Barbora Krejčíková (Czech Republic) Kateřina Siniaková	4–6, 3–6
Loss	8–5	Apr 2023	Charleston Open, US	WTA 500	Clay	(Mexico) Giuliana Olmos	(United States) Danielle Collins (United States) Desirae Krawczyk	6–0, 4–6, [12–14]
Win	9–5	Jun 2023	Rosmalen Open, Netherlands	WTA 250	Grass	(Japan) Shuko Aoyama	(Slovakia) Viktória Hrunčáková (Slovakia) Tereza Mihalíková	6–3, 6–3
Win	10–5	Aug 2023	Canadian Open, Canada	WTA 1000	Hard	(Japan) Shuko Aoyama	(United States) Desirae Krawczyk (Netherlands) Demi Schuurs	6–4, 4–6, [13–11]
Loss	10–6	Oct 2023	Zhengzhou Open, China	WTA 500	Hard	(Japan) Shuko Aoyama	(Canada) Gabriela Dabrowski (New Zealand) Erin Routliffe	2–6, 4–6
Win	11–6	Oct 2024	Japan Women's Open	WTA 250	Hard	(Germany) Laura Siegemund	(Spain) Cristina Bucșa (Romania) Monica Niculescu	3–6, 6–2, [10–2]
Loss	11–7	Oct 2024	Pan Pacific Open, Japan	WTA 500	Hard	(Germany) Laura Siegemund	(Japan) Shuko Aoyama (Japan) Eri Hozumi	4–6, 6–7^{(4)}
Loss	11–8	Jun 2025	Nottingham Open, UK	WTA 250	Grass	(Kazakhstan) Anna Danilina	(Germany) Laura Siegemund (Brazil) Beatriz Haddad Maia	3–6, 2–6

== WTA 125 finals ==
=== Doubles: 4 (2 titles, 3 runner-ups) ===
Result	W–L	Date	Tournament	Surface	Partner	Opponents	Score
Win	1–0	Jan 2019	Newport Beach Challenger, US	Hard	(United States) Hayley Carter	(United States) Taylor Townsend (Belgium) Yanina Wickmayer	6–3, 7–6^{(1)}
Loss	1–1	Nov 2019	Houston Challenger, US	Hard	(Canada) Sharon Fichman	(Australia) Ellen Perez (Brazil) Luisa Stefani	6–1, 4–6, [5–10]
Loss	1–2	Mar 2025	Puerto Vallarta Open, Mexico	Hard	(Australia) Maya Joint	(United States) Hanna Chang (United States) Christina McHale	6–2, 2–6, [7–10]
Loss	1–3	Jan 2026	Canberra International, Australia	Hard	Vera Zvonareva	Maria Kozyreva; Iryna Shymanovich	7–6^{(11–9)}, 5–7, [8–10]
Win	2–3	Jul 2026	ENKA Ladies Open, Turkey	Hard	Vera Zvonareva	Tatiana Prozorova; Alexandra Shubladze	6–3, 3–6, [10–8]

== ITF Circuit finals ==
=== Singles: 7 (2 title, 5 runner-ups) ===
Legend W100 tournaments (0–2) W75 tournaments (0–3) W35 tournaments (2–0)	Finals by surface Hard (2–4) Clay (0–1)

Result	W–L	Date	Tournament	Tier	Surface	Opponent	Score
Win	1–0	Feb 2024	ITF Spring, United States	W35	Hard	(United States) Iva Jovic	6–2, 4–6, 6–3
Loss	1–1	Apr 2024	Tokyo Open, Japan	W100	Hard	(Australia) Maddison Inglis	4–6, 6–3, 2–6
Loss	1–2	Sep 2024	Rancho Santa Fe Open, United States	W75	Hard	(United States) Iva Jovic	3–6, 3–6
Loss	1–3	Apr 2025	Tokyo Open, Japan	W100	Hard	(Japan) Wakana Sonobe	4–6, 7–6^{(1)}, 3–6
Loss	1–4	May 2025	Prague Open, Czechia	W75	Clay	(United Kingdom) Francesca Jones	3–6, 4–6
Loss	1–5	Mar 2026	Indoor Championships, Japan	W75	Hard (i)	(Japan) Hayu Kinoshita	5–7, 1–6
Win	2–5	Oct 2026	ITF Wagga Wagga, Australia	W35	Hard	(Japan) Naho Sato	6–2, 6–3

=== Doubles: 10 (8 titles, 2 runner-ups) ===
Legend W100 tournaments (1–0) W60 tournaments (3–1) W25 tournaments (4–1)	Finals by surface Hard (7–1) Grass (0–1) Carpet (1–0)

Result	W–L	Date	Tournament	Tier	Surface	Partner	Opponents	Score
Loss	0–1	Oct 2015	ITF Makinohara, Japan	W25	Grass	(Japan) Yukina Saigo	(Japan) Kanae Hisami (Japan) Kotomi Takahata	4–6, 1–6
Win	1–1	Jun 2018	ITF Baton Rouge, US	W25	Hard	(United States) Hayley Carter	(Australia) Astra Sharma (Romania) Gabriela Talaba	6–3, 6–4
Win	2–1	Aug 2018	Lexington Challenger, US	W60	Hard	(United States) Hayley Carter	(United States) Sanaz Marand (Mexico) Victoria Rodríguez	6–3, 6–1
Win	3–1	Oct 2018	Stockton Challenger, US	W60	Hard	(United States) Hayley Carter	(United States) Quinn Gleason (Brazil) Luisa Stefani	7–5, 5–7, [10–7]
Win	4–1	Nov 2018	ITF Lawrence, US	W25	Hard (i)	(Montenegro) Vladica Babić	(Kazakhstan) Anna Danilina (Russia) Ksenia Laskutova	6–4, 6–2
Win	5–1	Nov 2018	ITF Norman, US	W25	Hard	(Montenegro) Vladica Babić	(Mexico) María Portillo Ramírez (United States) Sofia Sewing	6–2, 6–3
Win	6–1	Feb 2019	Rancho Santa Fe Open, US	W25	Hard	(United States) Hayley Carter	(United States) Francesca Di Lorenzo (United States) Caty McNally	7–5, 6–2
Win	7–1	May 2019	Kurume Cup, Japan	W60	Carpet	(Japan) Hiroko Kuwata	(Japan) Erina Hayashi (Japan) Moyuka Uchijima	0–6, 6–4, [10–5]
Loss	7–2	Feb 2023	Burnie International, Australia	W60	Hard	(Australia) Arina Rodionova	(Japan) Mai Hontama (Japan) Eri Hozumi	6–4, 3–6, [6–10]
Win	8–2	Apr 2025	Tokyo Open, Japan	W100	Hard	(China) Guo Hanyu	(Thailand) Mananchaya Sawangkaew (Thailand) Lanlana Tararudee	5–7, 7–6^{(1)}, [10–5]

== Junior Grand Slam tournament finals ==
=== Girls' doubles: 1 (title) ===
Result	Year	Tournament	Surface	Partner	Opponents	Score
Win	2016	US Open	Hard	(United States) Jada Hart	(United States) Kayla Day (United States) Caroline Dolehide	4–6, 6–2, [13–11]
