= Tianjin Open =

Tournament information
- Founded: 2014; 12 years ago
- Abolished: 2019; 7 years ago
- Location: Tianjin; China
- Venue: Tianjin International Tennis Center
- Category: International
- Surface: Hard - outdoors
- Draw: 32S / 32Q / 16D
- Prize money: US$500,000 (2019)
- Website: tianjinopen.com

Current champions (2019)
- Singles: (Sweden) Rebecca Peterson
- Doubles: (Japan) Shuko Aoyama (Japan) Ena Shibahara

The Tianjin Open was an International-level WTA tennis event held at the Tianjin International Tennis Center. The venue has a center court that seats 3,500 people, as well as 12 outdoor courts with lights, four indoor courts and a tennis club.

In 2019, there were nine WTA-level tournaments in mainland China: WTA Finals in Shenzhen, WTA Elite Trophy in Zhuhai, Premier-level stops in Beijing, Wuhan and Zhengzhou, and International-level stops in Shenzhen, Nanchang, Guangzhou and Tianjin.

== Results ==
=== Singles ===
Year	Champion	Runner-up	Score
2014	(United States) Alison Riske	(Switzerland) Belinda Bencic	6–3, 6–4
2015	(Poland) Agnieszka Radwańska	(Montenegro) Danka Kovinić	6–1, 6–2
2016	(China) Peng Shuai	(United States) Alison Riske	7–6^{(7–3)}, 6–2
2017	(Russia) Maria Sharapova	(Belarus) Aryna Sabalenka	7–5, 7–6^{(10–8)}
2018	(France) Caroline Garcia	(Czech Republic) Karolína Plíšková	7–6^{(9–7)}, 6–3
2019	(Sweden) Rebecca Peterson	(United Kingdom) Heather Watson	6–4, 6–4
2020–2021	cancelled due to the COVID-19 pandemic		

=== Doubles ===
Year	Champions	Runners-up	Score
2014	(Russia) Alla Kudryavtseva (Australia) Anastasia Rodionova	(Romania) Sorana Cîrstea (Slovenia) Andreja Klepač	6–7^{(6–8)}, 6–2, [10–8]
2015	(China) Xu Yifan (China) Zheng Saisai	(Croatia) Darija Jurak (United States) Nicole Melichar	6–2, 3–6, [10–8]
2016	(United States) Christina McHale (China) Peng Shuai	(Poland) Magda Linette (China) Xu Yifan	7–6^{(10–8)}, 6–0
2017	(Romania) Irina-Camelia Begu (Italy) Sara Errani	(Slovenia) Dalila Jakupović (Serbia) Nina Stojanović	6–4, 6–3
2018	(United States) Nicole Melichar (Czech Republic) Květa Peschke	(Australia) Monique Adamczak (Australia) Jessica Moore	6–4, 6–2
2019	(Japan) Shuko Aoyama (Japan) Ena Shibahara	(Japan) Nao Hibino (Japan) Miyu Kato	6–3, 7–5
2020-2021	cancelled due to the COVID-19 pandemic		

== See also ==
- List of tennis tournaments
