= Johanna Konta career statistics =

Career finals
Discipline	Type	Won	Lost	Total	WR (Note: Winning rate)
Singles	Grand Slam	–	–	–	–
Singles	Summer Olympics	–	–	–	–
Singles	WTA Finals (Note: Formerly known as: Virginia Slims Championships (until 1995); WTA Tour Championships (until 2014))	–	–	–	–
Singles	WTA Elite (Note: Elite tier: WTA Tournament of Champions (2009–14); WTA Elite Trophy (2015–present))	–	–	–	–
Singles	WTA 1000 (Note: Formerly known as: Category 4 & 5 & 6 (until 1990); Tier I (until 2009); WTA Premier Mandatory and 5 (until 2021))	1	2	3	0.33
Singles	WTA 500 (Note: Formerly known as: Category 3 (until 1990); Tier II (until 2009); WTA Premier (until 2021))	2	0	2	1.00
Singles	WTA 250 (Note: Formerly known as: Category 1 & 2 (until 1990); Tier III & IV & V (until 2009); WTA International (until 2021))	1	3	4	0.25
Singles	Total	4	5	9	0.44
Doubles	Grand Slam	–	–	–	–
Doubles	Summer Olympics	–	–	–	–
Doubles	WTA Finals	–	–	–	–
Doubles	WTA Elite	–	–	–	–
Doubles	WTA 1000	–	–	–	–
Doubles	WTA 500	–	–	–	–
Doubles	WTA 250	–	–	–	–
Doubles	Total	–	–	–	–
Total		4	5	9	0.44

Johanna Konta is a British former professional tennis player who was ranked as high as No. 4 in the world. She won four singles titles on the WTA Tour, as well as eleven singles and four doubles titles on the ITF Circuit in her career. Below is a list of her career achievements and titles won.

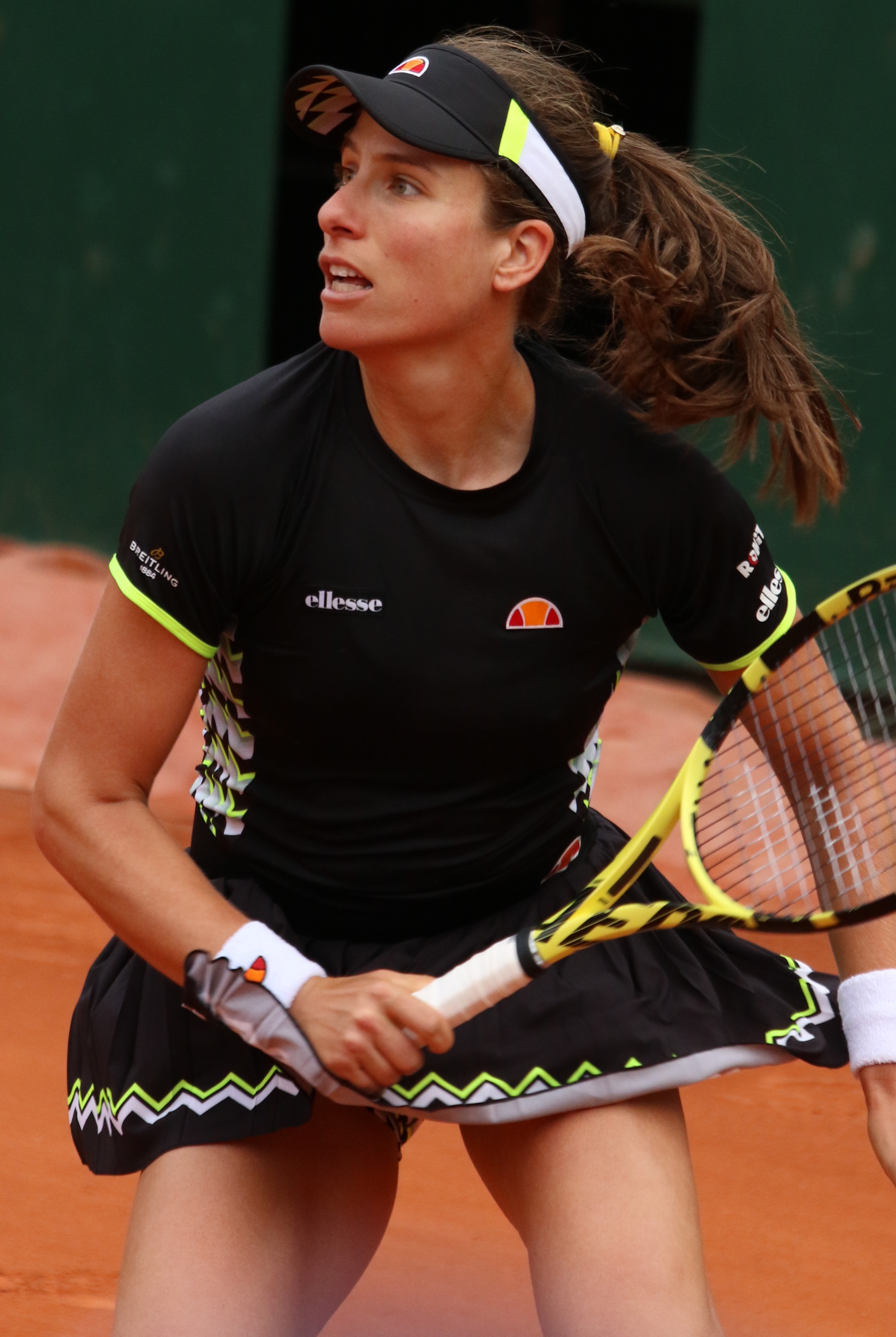
Konta at the 2019 French Open

== Performance timelines ==
Key
W	F	SF	QF	#R	RR	Q#	P#	DNQ	A	Z#	PO	G	S	B	NMS	NTI	P	NH

(W) winner; (F) finalist; (SF) semifinalist; (QF) quarterfinalist; (#R) rounds 4, 3, 2, 1; (RR) round-robin stage; (Q#) qualification round; (P#) preliminary round; (DNQ) did not qualify; (A) absent; (Z#) Davis/Fed Cup Zonal Group (with number indication) or (PO) play-off; (G) gold, (S) silver or (B) bronze Olympic/Paralympic medal; (NMS) not a Masters tournament; (NTI) not a Tier I tournament; (P) postponed; (NH) not held; (SR) strike rate (events won / competed); (W–L) win–loss record.
To avoid confusion and double counting, these charts are updated at the conclusion of a tournament or when the player's participation has ended.

Only main-draw results in WTA Tour, Grand Slam tournaments, Billie Jean King Cup (Fed Cup), Hopman Cup and Olympic Games are included in win–loss records.

=== Singles ===
Tournament	2011	2012	2013	2014	2015	2016	2017	2018	2019	2020	2021	SR	W–L	Win %
Grand Slam tournaments
Australian Open	A	A	Q2	Q2	Q1	SF	QF	2R	2R	1R	1R	0 / 6	11–6	69%
French Open	A	A	Q2	Q3	1R	1R	1R	1R	SF	1R	1R	0 / 7	5–7	42%
Wimbledon	A	1R	1R	1R	1R	2R	SF	2R	QF	NH	A	0 / 8	11–8	58%
US Open	A	2R	Q1	1R	4R	4R	1R	1R	QF	2R	A	0 / 8	12–8	60%
Win–loss	0–0	1–2	0–1	0–2	3–3	9–4	9–4	2–4	14–4	1–3	0–2	0 / 29	39–29	57%
Year-end championships
WTA Finals	DNQ					Alt	Alt/A	DNQ	Alt/A	NH	DNQ	0 / 0	0–0	–
WTA Elite Trophy	DNQ					SF	A	DNQ	A	NH	DNQ	0 / 1	2–1	67%
National representation
Summer Olympics	NH	A	NH			QF	NH				A	0 / 1	3–1	75%
Billie Jean King Cup	A	A	Z1	Z1	Z1	A	Z1	PO	PO	A	A	0 / 0	18–7	72%
WTA 1000 tournaments
Dubai / Qatar Open (Note: The first Premier 5 event of the year has switched back and forth between the Dubai Tennis Championships and the Qatar Total Open since 2009. Dubai was classified as a Premier 5 event from 2009 to 2011 before being succeeded by Doha for the 2012–2014 period. In 2015, Dubai regained its Premier 5 status while Doha was demoted to Premier status. The Premier 5 tournaments were reclassified as WTA 1000 tournaments in 2021.)	A	A	A	A	A	A	A	3R	A	A	A	0 / 1	2–1	67%
Indian Wells Open	A	A	A	Q2	Q2	4R	3R	2R	3R	NH	A	0 / 4	5–4	56%
Miami Open	A	A	A	A	A	QF	W	4R	2R	NH	3R	1 / 5	13–4	76%
Madrid Open	NH	A	A	A	A	1R	1R	2R	2R	NH	2R	0 / 5	3–5	38%
Italian Open	A	A	A	A	A	3R	3R	3R	F	3R	1R	0 / 6	11–6	65%
Canadian Open	A	A	A	A	A	QF	2R	3R	1R	NH	3R (Note: Withdraw during the tournament. Not counted as a loss.)	0 / 5	7–4	64%
Cincinnati Open	NT1	A	A	A	A	3R	QF	1R	1R	SF	1R	0 / 6	6–6	50%
Pan Pacific / Wuhan Open (Note: In 2014, the Toray Pan Pacific Open was downgraded to a Premier event and replaced by the Wuhan Open. The Premier 5 tournaments were reclassified as WTA 1000 tournaments in 2021.)	A	A	A	A	QF	QF	2R	1R	A	NH		0 / 4	6–4	60%
China Open	NT1	A	A	A	A	F	1R	1R	A	NH		0 / 3	5–3	63%
Win–loss	0–0	0–0	0–0	0–0	3–1	19–8	10–7	9–9	9–6	4–2	4–4	1 / 39	58–37	61%
Career statistics
	2011	2012	2013	2014	2015	2016	2017	2018	2019	2020	2021	Career		
Tournaments	1	3	5	8	8	24	19	24	15	9	10	Career total: 126		
Titles	0	0	0	0	0	1	2	0	0	0	1	Career total: 4		
Finals	0	0	0	0	0	2	3	1	2	0	1	Career total: 8		
Hard win–loss	0–1	2–2	2–1	0–4	7–3	38–14	21–9	17–15	14–8	7–7	4–5	3 / 75	112–69	62%
Clay win–loss	0–0	0–0	0–1	0–1	0–1	2–4	2–4	3–4	15–4	1–2	1–3	0 / 24	24–24	50%
Grass win–loss	0–0	0–1	1–3	2–3	6–4	6–4	13–3	6–4	7–3	0–0	5–0	1 / 27	46–25	65%
Overall win–loss	0–1	2–3	3–5	2–8	13–8	46–22	36–16	26–23	36–15	8–9	10–8	4 / 126	182–118	61%
Win (%)	0%	40%	38%	20%	62%	68%	69%	53%	71%	47%	56%	Career total: 61%		
Year-end ranking (Note: 2008: WTA ranking–668, 2009: WTA ranking–360, 2010: WTA ranking–248.)	305	153	112	150	47	10	9	39	12	14	111	$10,008,175		

=== Doubles ===
Tournament	2012	2013	2014	2015	2016	2017	2018	2019	2020	2021	SR	W–L	Win%
Australian Open	A	A	A	A	2R	A	A	A	A	A	0 / 1	1–1	50%
French Open	A	A	A	A	1R	A	1R	A	A	A	0 / 1	0–2	0%
Wimbledon	1R	1R	1R	2R	3R	A	A	A	NH	A	0 / 5	3–5	38%
US Open	A	A	A	A	A	A	A	A	A	A	0 / 0	0–0	–
Win–loss	0–1	0–1	0–1	1–1	3–3	0–0	0–1	0–0	0–0	0–0	0 / 8	4–8	33%
National representation
Summer Olympics	A	NH			2R	NH				A	0 / 1	1–1	50%
Billie Jean King Cup (Note: Formerly known as Fed Cup until 2020.)	A	Z1	Z1	Z1	A	Z1	PO	PO	A	A	0 / 0	2–3	40%
Career statistics
Year-end ranking	505	393	285	104	110	286	102	481	269	249			

== Significant finals ==
=== WTA 1000 ===
==== Singles: 3 (1 title, 2 runner-ups) ====
Result	Year	Tournament	Surface	Opponent	Score
Loss	2016	China Open	Hard	(Poland) Agnieszka Radwańska	4–6, 2–6
Win	2017	Miami Open	Hard	(Denmark) Caroline Wozniacki	6–4, 6–3
Loss	2019	Italian Open	Clay	(Czech Republic) Karolína Plíšková	3–6, 4–6

== WTA Tour finals ==
=== Singles: 9 (4 titles, 5 runner-ups) ===
Legend WTA 1000 (Premier 5 / Premier M) (1–2) WTA 500 (Premier) (2–0) WTA 250 (International) (1–3)	Finals by surface Hard (3–1) Clay (0–2) Grass (1–2)

Result	W–L	Date	Tournament	Tier	Surface	Opponent	Score
Win	1–0	Jul 2016	Stanford Classic, U.S.	Premier	Hard	(United States) Venus Williams	7–5, 5–7, 6–2
Loss	1–1	Oct 2016	China Open	Premier M	Hard	(Poland) Agnieszka Radwańska	4–6, 2–6
Win	2–1	Jan 2017	Sydney International, Australia	Premier	Hard	(Poland) Agnieszka Radwańska	6–4, 6–2
Win	3–1	Apr 2017	Miami Open, U.S.	Premier M	Hard	(Denmark) Caroline Wozniacki	6–4, 6–3
Loss	3–2	Jun 2017	Nottingham Open, UK	International	Grass	(Croatia) Donna Vekić	6–2, 6–7^{(3–7)}, 5–7
Loss	3–3	Jun 2018	Nottingham Open, UK	International	Grass	(Australia) Ashleigh Barty	3–6, 6–3, 4–6
Loss	3–4	May 2019	Morocco Open	International	Clay	(Greece) Maria Sakkari	6–2, 4–6, 1–6
Loss	3–5	May 2019	Italian Open	Premier 5	Clay	(Czech Republic) Karolína Plíšková	3–6, 4–6
Win	4–5	Jun 2021	Nottingham Open, UK	WTA 250	Grass	(China) Zhang Shuai	6–2, 6–1

== ITF Circuit finals ==
=== Singles: 14 (11 titles, 3 runner-ups) ===
Legend $100,000 tournaments $50,000 tournaments $25,000 tournaments $10,000 tournaments	Finals by surface Hard (8–2) Clay (3–1)

Result	W–L	Date	Tournament	Tier	Surface	Opponent	Score
Win	1–0	May 2008	ITF Mostar, Bosnia and Herzegovina	10,000	Clay	(Austria) Janina Toljan	6–3, 3–6, 6–4
Loss	1–1	Feb 2009	ITF Sutton, UK	25,000	Hard (i)	(United Kingdom) Katie O'Brien	6–3, 2–6, 4–6
Win	2–1	Jun 2009	ITF Waterloo, Canada	25,000	Clay	(Canada) Heidi El Tabakh	6–2, 3–6, 6–3
Win	3–1	May 2010	Merz Aesthetics Challenger, U.S.	50,000	Clay	(United States) Lindsay Lee-Waters	6–2, 5–7, 6–4
Win	4–1	Aug 2010	ITF Westende, Belgium	10,000	Hard	(Belgium) Nicky Van Dyck	6–1, 6–0
Win	5–1	Jul 2011	ITF Woking, UK	25,000	Hard	(United Kingdom) Laura Robson	6–4, 1–1 ret.
Win	6–1	Sep 2011	ITF Madrid, Spain	10,000	Hard	(United Kingdom) Lucy Brown	6–2, 6–1
Win	7–1	Feb 2012	ITF Rancho Mirage, U.S.	25,000	Hard	(Slovakia) Lenka Wienerová	6–0, 6–4
Loss	7–2	Jul 2012	Lexington Challenger, U.S.	50,000	Hard	(Israel) Julia Glushko	3–6, 0–6
Win	8–2	Jul 2013	ITF Winnipeg, Canada	25,000	Hard	(United Kingdom) Samantha Murray	6–3, 6–1
Win	9–2	Jul 2013	Vancouver Open, Canada	100,000	Hard	(Canada) Sharon Fichman	6–4, 6–2
Loss	9–3	Apr 2015	ITF Jackson, United States	25,000	Clay	(Ukraine) Anhelina Kalinina	3–6, 4–6
Win	10–3	Jul 2015	Challenger de Granby, Canada	50,000	Hard	(France) Stéphanie Foretz	6–2, 6–4
Win	11–3	Aug 2015	Vancouver Open, Canada (2)	100,000	Hard	(Belgium) Kirsten Flipkens	6–2, 6–4

=== Doubles: 7 (4 titles, 3 runner-ups) ===
Legend $100,000 tournaments $75,000 tournaments $50,000 tournaments $25,000 tournaments	Finals by surface Hard (2–2) Clay (2–1)

Result	W–L	Date	Tournament	Tier	Surface	Partner	Opponents	Score
Win	1–0	Mar 2011	ITF Irapuato, Mexico	25,000	Hard	(Hungary) Tímea Babos	(United States) Macall Harkins (Austria) Nicole Rottmann	6–3, 6–4
Loss	1–1	Sep 2011	GB Pro-Series Shrewsbury, UK	75,000	Hard (i)	(United Kingdom) Amanda Elliott	(Portugal) Maria João Koehler (Hungary) Katalin Marosi	6–7^{(3–7)}, 1–6
Loss	1–2	May 2014	Open Saint-Gaudens, France	50,000	Clay	(Canada) Sharon Fichman	(Paraguay) Verónica Cepede Royg (Argentina) María Irigoyen	5–7, 3–6
Loss	1–3	Feb 2015	ITF Surprise, U.S.	25,000	Hard	(United States) Maria Sanchez	(United States) Jacqueline Cako (United States) Kaitlyn Christian	4–6, 7–5, [7–10]
Win	2–3	Apr 2015	Hardee's Pro Classic, U.S.	50,000	Clay	(United States) Maria Sanchez	(Brazil) Paula Cristina Gonçalves (Czech Republic) Petra Krejsová	6–3, 6–4
Win	3–3	May 2015	Open de Cagnes-sur-Mer, France	100,000	Clay	(France) Laura Thorpe	(United Kingdom) Jocelyn Rae (United Kingdom) Anna Smith	1–6, 6–4, [10–5]
Win	4–3	Aug 2015	Vancouver Open, Canada	100,000	Hard	(United States) Maria Sanchez	(Romania) Raluca Olaru (United States) Anna Tatishvili	7–6^{(7–5)}, 6–4

== Fed Cup participation ==
=== Singles ===
Edition	Stage	Date	Location	Against	Surface	Opponent	W/L	Score
2013	WG2 P/O	20 Apr 2013	Buenos Aires, Argentina	Argentina	Clay	Paula Ormaechea	L	3–6, 2–6
2014	Z1 R/R	5 Feb 2014	Budapest, Hungary	Latvia	Hard (i)	Diāna Marcinkēviča	W	6–3, 4–6, 7–5
2014	Z1 R/R	5 Feb 2014	Budapest, Hungary	Romania	Hard (i)	Simona Halep	L	1–6, 4–6
2014	Z1 R/R	5 Feb 2014	Budapest, Hungary	Hungary	Hard (i)	Tímea Babos	L	6–4, 6–7^{(5–7)}, 4–6
2015	Z1 R/R	4 Feb 2015	Budapest, Hungary	Liechtenstein	Hard (i)	Kathinka von Deichmann	W	6–0, 6–0
2015	Z1 R/R	4 Feb 2015	Budapest, Hungary	Turkey	Hard (i)	İpek Soylu	L	3–6, 6–7^{(6–8)}
2015	Z1 R/R	4 Feb 2015	Budapest, Hungary	Ukraine	Hard (i)	Lesia Tsurenko	W	6–3, 6–2
2015	Z1 P/O	7 Feb 2015	Budapest, Hungary	Belarus	Hard (i)	Olga Govortsova	L	0–6, 1–6
2017	Z1 R/R	8 Feb 2017	Tallinn, Estonia	Portugal	Hard (i)	Michelle Larcher de Brito	W	6–2, 6–4
2017	Z1 R/R	8 Feb 2017	Tallinn, Estonia	Latvia	Hard (i)	Jeļena Ostapenko	W	6–2, 6–3
2017	Z1 R/R	8 Feb 2017	Tallinn, Estonia	Turkey	Hard (i)	Çağla Büyükakçay	W	5–7, 6–4, 6–3
2017	Z1 P/O	11 Feb 2017	Tallinn, Estonia	Croatia	Hard (i)	Ana Konjuh	L	4–6, 3–6
2017	WG2 P/O	22-23 Apr 2017	Constanța, Romania	Romania	Clay	Sorana Cîrstea	W	6–2, 6–3
2017	WG2 P/O	22-23 Apr 2017	Constanța, Romania	Romania	Clay	Simona Halep	L	1–6, 3–6
2018	Z1 R/R	7 Feb 2018	Tallinn, Estonia	Portugal	Hard (i)	Maria João Koehler	W	6–1, 6–0
2018	Z1 R/R	7 Feb 2018	Tallinn, Estonia	Estonia	Hard (i)	Anett Kontaveit	W	6–7, 6–4, 6–2
2018	Z1 P/O	10 Feb 2018	Tallinn, Estonia	Hungary	Hard (i)	Fanni Stollar	W	6–3, 6–1
2018	WG2 P/O	21–22 Apr 2018	Miki, Japan	Japan	Hard (i)	Kurumi Nara	W	6–4, 6–2
2018	WG2 P/O	21–22 Apr 2018	Miki, Japan	Japan	Hard (i)	Naomi Osaka	W	6–3, 6–3
2019	Z1 R/R	6 Feb 2019	Bath, United Kingdom	Slovenia	Hard (i)	Dalila Jakupovic	W	7–6, 6–2
2019	Z1 R/R	6 Feb 2019	Bath, United Kingdom	Greece	Hard (i)	Maria Sakkari	W	4–6, 6–2, 6–3
2019	Z1 R/R	6 Feb 2019	Bath, United Kingdom	Hungary	Hard (i)	Anna Bondar	W	6–2, 6–7, 7–6
2019	Z1 P/O	9 Feb 2019	Bath, United Kingdom	Serbia	Hard (i)	Aleksandra Krunić	W	7–6, 3–6, 6–2
2019	WG2 P/O	20–21 Apr 2019	London, United Kingdom	Kazakhstan	Hard (i)	Zarina Diyas	W	4–6, 6–3, 6–2
2019	WG2 P/O	20–21 Apr 2019	London, United Kingdom	Kazakhstan	Hard (i)	Yulia Putintseva	W	4–6, 6–2, 7–5

=== Doubles ===
Edition	Stage	Date	Location	Against	Surface	Partner	Opponents	W/L	Score
2013	Z1 R/R	7 Feb 2013	Eilat, Israel	Bosnia and Herzegovina	Hard	Laura Robson	Jasmina Kajtazovič; Jelena Simić	W	6–0, 6–0
2013	Z1 R/R	7 Feb 2013	Eilat, Israel	Hungary	Hard	Laura Robson	Réka-Luca Jani; Katalin Marosi	L	4–6, 6–2, 2–6
2014	Z1 R/R	8 Feb 2014	Budapest, Hungary	Hungary	Hard (i)	Tara Moore	Tímea Babos; Réka Luca Jani	L	7–5, 5–7, 3–6
2017	Z1 P/O	11 Feb 2017	Tallinn, Estonia	Croatia	Hard (i)	Heather Watson	Darija Jurak; Ana Konjuh	W	4–6, 6–4, 6–3
2018	WG2 P/O	21–22 Apr 2018	Miki, Japan	Japan	Hard (i)	Heather Watson	Miyu Kato; Makoto Ninomiya	L	6–3, 3–6, 3–6

== WTA Tour career earnings ==
Year	Grand Slam singles titles	WTA singles titles	Total singles titles	Earnings ($)	Money list rank
2014	0	0	0	156,297	144
2015	0	0	0	434,779	67
2016	0	1	1	2,363,882	11
2017	0	2	2	2,931,494	10
2018	0	0	0	1,046,093	36
2019	0	0	0	2,173,945	14
2020	0	0	0	373,321	58
2021	0	0	0	280,490	134
Career	0	3	3	10,008,175	57

== Career Grand Slam statistics ==
=== Grand Slam seedings ===
The tournaments won by Konta are in boldface, and advanced into finals by Konta are in italics.

Year	Australian Open	French Open	Wimbledon	US Open
2012	absent	absent	wildcard	qualifier
2013	did not qualify	did not qualify	wildcard	did not qualify
2014	did not qualify	did not qualify	unseeded	unseeded
2015	did not qualify	qualifier	unseeded	qualifier
2016	unseeded	20th	16th	13th
2017	9th	7th	6th	7th
2018	9th	22nd	22nd	unseeded
2019	unseeded	26th	19th	16th
2020	12th	9th	not held	9th
2021	13th	19th	absent	absent

=== Best Grand Slam tournament results details ===
Australian Open
2016 Australian Open (not seeded)
Round	Opponent	Rank	Score
1R	(United States) Venus Williams (8)	**10**	6–4, 6–2
2R	(China) Zheng Saisai	83	6–2, 6–3
3R	(Czech Republic) Denisa Allertová	66	6–2, 6–2
4R	(Russia) Ekaterina Makarova (21)	24	4–6, 6–4, 8–6
QF	(China) Zhang Shuai (Q)	133	6–4, 6–1
SF	(Germany) **Angelique Kerber** (7)	**6**	5–7, 2–6

French Open
2019 French Open (26th seed)
Round	Opponent	Rank	Score
1R	(Germany) Antonia Lottner (Q)	147	6–4, 6–4
2R	(United States) Lauren Davis (WC)	111	6–3, 1–6, 6–3
3R	(Slovakia) Viktória Kužmová	46	6–2, 6–1
4R	(Croatia) Donna Vekić (23)	24	6-2, 6-4
QF	(United States) Sloane Stephens (7)	**7**	6–1, 6–4
SF	(Czech Republic) Markéta Vondroušová	38	5–7, 6–7^{(2–7)}

Wimbledon Championships
2017 Wimbledon (6th Seed)
Round	Opponent	Rank	Score
1R	(Chinese Taipei) Hsieh Su-wei	113	6–2, 6–2
2R	(Croatia) Donna Vekić	58	7–6^{(7–4)}, 4–6, 10–8
3R	(Greece) Maria Sakkari	101	6–4, 6–1
4R	(France) Caroline Garcia (21)	22	7–6^{(7–3)}, 4–6, 6–4
QF	(Romania) Simona Halep (2)	**2**	6–7^{(2–7)}, 7–6^{(7–5)}, 6–4
SF	(United States) Venus Williams (10)	11	4–6, 2–6

US Open
2019 US Open (16th Seed)
Round	Opponent	Rank	Score
1R	(Russia) Daria Kasatkina	42	6–1, 4–6, 6–2
2R	(Russia) Margarita Gasparyan	61	6–1, 6–0
3R	(China) Zhang Shuai (33)	34	6–2, 6–3
4R	(Czech Republic) Karolína Plíšková (3)	**3**	6–7^{(1–7)}, 6–3, 7–5
QF	(Ukraine) Elina Svitolina (5)	**5**	4–6, 4–6

== Record against other players ==
=== No. 1 wins ===
No.	Player	Event	Surface	Round	Score	Result
1.	(Germany) Angelique Kerber	2017 Eastbourne International	Grass	QF	6–3, 6–4	SF

=== Top 10 wins ===
Season	2015	2016	2017	2018	2019	2020	2021	Total
Wins	3	7	4	0	7	0	1	22

#	Player	Rank	Tournament	Surface	Round	Score	JKR
2015
1.	(Russia) Ekaterina Makarova	8	Eastbourne International, UK	Grass	2R	6–2, 6–4	146
2.	(Spain) Garbiñe Muguruza	9	US Open	Hard	2R	7–6^{(7–4)}, 6–7^{(4–7)}, 6–2	97
3.	(Romania) Simona Halep	2	Wuhan Open, China	Hard	3R	6–3, 3–6, 7–5	63
2016
4.	(United States) Venus Williams	10	Australian Open	Hard	1R	6–4, 6–2	47
5.	(Italy) Roberta Vinci	7	Italian Open	Clay	2R	6–0, 6–4	23
6.	(United States) Venus Williams	7	Stanford Classic, U.S.	Hard	F	7–5, 5–7, 6–2	18
7.	(Russia) Svetlana Kuznetsova	10	Rio Summer Olympics	Hard	3R	3–6, 7–5, 7–5	47
8.	(Spain) Carla Suárez Navarro	8	Wuhan Open, China	Hard	3R	7–5, 7–6^{(8–6)}	13
9.	(Czech Republic) Karolína Plíšková	6	China Open	Hard	3R	6–1, 3–6, 7–6^{(7–2)}	14
10.	(United States) Madison Keys	9	China Open	Hard	SF	7–6^{(7–1)}, 4–6, 6–4	14
2017
11.	(Poland) Agnieszka Radwańska	3	Sydney International, Australia	Hard	F	6–4, 6–2	10
12.	(Romania) Simona Halep	4	Miami Open, U.S.	Hard	QF	3–6, 7–6^{(9–7)}, 6–2	11
13.	(Germany) Angelique Kerber	1	Eastbourne International, UK	Grass	QF	6–3, 6–4	7
14.	(Romania) Simona Halep	2	Wimbledon, UK	Grass	QF	6–7^{(2–7)}, 7–6^{(7–5)}, 6–4	7
2019
15.	(United States) Sloane Stephens	6	Brisbane International, Australia	Hard	1R	6–4, 6–3	37
16.	(United States) Sloane Stephens	8	Italian Open	Clay	2R	6–7^{(3–7)}, 6–4, 6–1	42
17.	(Netherlands) Kiki Bertens	4	Italian Open	Clay	SF	5–7, 7–5, 6–2	42
18.	(United States) Sloane Stephens	7	French Open	Clay	QF	6–1, 6–4	26
19.	(United States) Sloane Stephens	9	Wimbledon, UK	Grass	3R	3–6, 6–4, 6–1	18
20.	(Czech Republic) Petra Kvitová	6	Wimbledon, UK	Grass	4R	4–6, 6–2, 6–4	18
21.	(Czech Republic) Karolína Plíšková	3	US Open	Hard	4R	6–7^{(1–7)}, 6–3, 7–5	16
2021
22.	(Ukraine) Elina Svitolina	5	Canadian Open	Hard	2R	3–6, 6–3, 6–2	41
