= 2017 Aegon International Eastbourne – Men's singles =

Men's singles
- 2017 Aegon International Eastbourne

Final
- Champion: (Serbia) Novak Djokovic
- Runner-up: (France) Gaël Monfils
- Score: 6–3, 6–4

Details
- Draw: 28 (4 Q / 3 WC )
- Seeds: 8

Events
| Singles | men | women |
| Doubles | men | women |
- Aegon International Eastbourne

Feliciano López was the champion in 2014, when the men's event was last held, but withdrew before the tournament began.

Novak Djokovic won the title, defeating Gaël Monfils in the final, 6–3, 6–4. This tournament marked the first time since 2010 that Djokovic played a grass-court tournament before Wimbledon. It was also the only tournament that Djokovic won without his coach being Marián Vajda until the duo split in 2022.

== Seeds ==
The top four seeds receive a bye into the second round.

1. (Serbia) Novak Djokovic (champion)
2. (France) Gaël Monfils (final)
3. (United States) John Isner (quarterfinals)
4. (United States) Steve Johnson (quarterfinals)
5. (United States) Sam Querrey (first round)
6. (Germany) Mischa Zverev (second round)
7. (France) Richard Gasquet (semifinals)
8. (Argentina) Diego Schwartzman (first round)

== Draw ==
Key

- Q = Qualifier
- WC = Wild card
- LL = Lucky loser
- Alt = Alternate
- ITF = ITF entry
- PR = Protected ranking
- SR = Special ranking
- SE = Special exempt
- JE = Junior exempt
- JR = Junior Accelerator Programme entrant
- CO = College Accelerator Programme entrant
- NG = Next Gen Accelerator Program entrant
- w/o = Walkover
- r = Retired
- d = Defaulted

=== Finals ===
Semifinals
1/WC | (Serbia) Novak Djokovic | 6 | 6
(Russia) Daniil Medvedev | 4 | 4
7 | (France) Richard Gasquet | 2 | 7^{9} | 6^{4}
2/WC | (France) Gaël Monfils | 6 | 6^{7} | 7^{7}

Final
1/WC | (Serbia) Novak Djokovic | 6 | 6
2/WC | (France) Gaël Monfils | 3 | 4

=== Top half ===
First round
(Czech Republic) J Veselý | 3 | 4
Q | (Canada) V Pospisil | 6 | 6
(United States) D Young | 6 | 3 | 6
(United Kingdom) K Edmund | 4 | 6 | 3
(United States) J Donaldson | 7^{7} | 3 | 7
8 | (Argentina) D Schwartzman | 6^{5} | 6 | 5
Q | (Italy) T Fabbiano | 7^{7} | 6
Q | (Croatia) F Škugor | 6^{5} | 4
(France) N Mahut | 4 | 6^{4}
(Netherlands) R Haase | 6 | 7^{7}
(Russia) D Medvedev | 6 | 7
5 | (United States) S Querrey | 3 | 5

Second round
1/WC | (Serbia) N Djokovic | 6 | 6
Q | (Canada) V Pospisil | 4 | 3
(United States) D Young | 6 | 7
(United States) J Donaldson | 4 | 5
4 | (United States) S Johnson | 6 | 5 | 6
Q | (Italy) T Fabbiano | 3 | 7 | 4
(Netherlands) R Haase | 6 | 1 | 2
(Russia) D Medvedev | 4 | 6 | 6

Quarterfinals
1/WC | (Serbia) N Djokovic | 6 | 7^{11}
(United States) D Young | 2 | 6^{9}
4 | (United States) S Johnson | 3 | 6 | 3
(Russia) D Medvedev | 6 | 2 | 6

Semifinals
1/WC | (Serbia) N Djokovic | 6 | 6
(Russia) D Medvedev | 4 | 4

=== Bottom half ===
First round
7 | (France) R Gasquet | 5 | 7^{7} | 6
(United States) F Tiafoe | 7 | 6^{4} | 3
(Brazil) T Bellucci | 3 | 1
(South Africa) K Anderson | 6 | 6
(France) J Chardy | 4 | 7^{7} | 3
(Serbia) D Lajović | 6 | 6^{5} | 6
6 | (Germany) M Zverev | 6 | 7^{11}
(United States) R Harrison | 4 | 6^{9}
Q | (Slovakia) N Gombos | 6^{3} | 3
(Australia) B Tomic | 7^{7} | 6
WC | (United Kingdom) C Norrie | 6 | 7^{7}
(Argentina) H Zeballos | 4 | 6^{4}

Second round
7 | (France) R Gasquet | 6 | 6
(South Africa) K Anderson | 4 | 4
(Serbia) D Lajović | 6 | 6^{2} | 6^{4}
3 | (United States) J Isner | 3 | 7^{7} | 7^{7}
6 | (Germany) M Zverev | 3 | 2
(Australia) B Tomic | 6 | 6
WC | (United Kingdom) C Norrie | 3 | 2
2/WC | (France) G Monfils | 6 | 6

Quarterfinals
7 | (France) R Gasquet | 6 | 6
3 | (United States) J Isner | 3 | 2
(Australia) B Tomic | 6^{4} | 0
2/WC | (France) G Monfils | 7^{7} | 6

Semifinals
7 | (France) R Gasquet | 2 | 7^{9} | 6^{4}
2/WC | (France) G Monfils | 6 | 6^{7} | 7^{7}

== Qualifying ==
=== Seeds ===
1. (Canada) Vasek Pospisil (qualified)
2. (Russia) Andrey Kuznetsov (qualifying competition)
3. (Slovakia) Norbert Gombos (qualified)
4. (Italy) Thomas Fabbiano (qualified)
5. (Poland) Jerzy Janowicz (first round)
6. (Canada) Steven Diez (first round)
7. (Czech Republic) Marek Jaloviec (first round)
8. (Chinese Taipei) Chen Ti (qualifying competition)

=== Qualifiers ===
1. (Canada) Vasek Pospisil
2. (Croatia) Franko Škugor
3. (Slovakia) Norbert Gombos
4. (Italy) Thomas Fabbiano

=== Qualifying draw ===
==== First qualifier ====
First round
1 | (Canada) Vasek Pospisil | 6 | 6
WC | (United Kingdom) James Ward | 1 | 4
(Croatia) Ivan Dodig | 3 | 6 | 7
6 | (Canada) Steven Diez | 6 | 3 | 5

Qualifying competition
1 | (Canada) Vasek Pospisil | w/o
(Croatia) Ivan Dodig

==== Second qualifier ====
First round
2 | (Russia) Andrey Kuznetsov | 6 | 6
(Zimbabwe) Takanyi Garanganga | 0 | 3
(Croatia) Franko Škugor | 7^{7} | 7^{7}
5 | (Poland) Jerzy Janowicz | 6^{3} | 6^{5}

Qualifying competition
2 | (Russia) Andrey Kuznetsov | 6 | 4 | 4
(Croatia) Franko Škugor | 2 | 6 | 6

==== Third qualifier ====
First round
3 | (Slovakia) Norbert Gombos | 6 | 7^{7}
(Australia) Luke Saville | 4 | 6^{2}
WC | (United Kingdom) Luke Bambridge | 6 | 6
7 | (Czech Republic) Marek Jaloviec | 4 | 4

Qualifying competition
3 | (Slovakia) Norbert Gombos | 6 | 6
WC | (United Kingdom) Luke Bambridge | 2 | 2

==== Fourth qualifier ====
First round
4 | (Italy) Thomas Fabbiano | 6 | 6
Alt | (Argentina) Andrés Molteni | 1 | 1
(Czech Republic) Michal Konečný | 6 | 6^{4} | 5
8 | (Chinese Taipei) Chen Ti | 2 | 7^{7} | 7

Qualifying competition
4 | (Italy) Thomas Fabbiano | 6 | 6
8 | (Chinese Taipei) Chen Ti | 1 | 4
