= 2017 Aegon International Eastbourne – Men's doubles =

Men's doubles
- 2017 Aegon International Eastbourne

Final
- Champions: (United States) Bob Bryan (United States) Mike Bryan
- Runners-up: (India) Rohan Bopanna (Brazil) André Sá
- Score: 6–7^{(4–7)}, 6–4, [10–3]

Details
- Draw: 16
- Seeds: 4

Events
Singles	men	women
Doubles	men	women
← 2016 ·	Aegon International Eastbourne	· 2018 →

Treat Huey and Dominic Inglot were the champions in 2014, when the men's event was last held, but Huey chose not to participate this year. Inglot played alongside Robin Haase, but lost in the semifinals to Rohan Bopanna and André Sá.

Bob and Mike Bryan won the title, defeating Bopanna and Sá in the final, 6–7^{(4–7)}, 6–4, [10–3].

== Seeds ==
1. (United States) Bob Bryan / (United States) Mike Bryan (champions)
2. (Croatia) Ivan Dodig / (France) Édouard Roger-Vasselin (withdrew)
3. (United States) Ryan Harrison / (New Zealand) Michael Venus (first round)
4. (France) Fabrice Martin / (Canada) Daniel Nestor (first round)

== Draw ==
=== Key ===
- Q = Qualifier
- WC = Wild card
- LL = Lucky loser
- Alt = Alternate
- SE = Special exempt
- PR = Protected ranking
- ITF = ITF entry
- JE = Junior exempt
- w/o = Walkover
- r = Retired
- d = Defaulted
- SR = Special ranking

=== Draw ===
First round
1	(United States) B Bryan (United States) M Bryan	7	6
(United States) D Young (Serbia) N Zimonjić	5	3
WC	(United Kingdom) B Klein (United Kingdom) J Salisbury	6	3	[5]
(United Kingdom) K Skupski (United Kingdom) N Skupski	4	6	[10]
4	(France) F Martin (Canada) D Nestor	6^{5}	2
(Germany) A Begemann (Argentina) A Molteni	7^{7}	6
(Argentina) D Schwartzman (Czech Republic) J Veselý	6	3	[10]
WC	(United Kingdom) S Clayton (United Kingdom) J O'Mara	4	6	[7]
(Netherlands) R Haase (United Kingdom) D Inglot	6	6
(Chile) J Peralta (Argentina) H Zeballos	4	4
(India) J Nedunchezhiyan (Australia) M Reid	6	3	[10]
3	(United States) R Harrison (New Zealand) M Venus	3	6	[7]
(Austria) J Knowle (Austria) P Oswald	6	4	[7]
(Poland) M Matkowski (Belarus) M Mirnyi	4	6	[10]
(India) R Bopanna (Brazil) A Sá	6	6
Alt	(Italy) T Fabbiano (Australia) L Saville	3	4

Quarterfinals
1	(United States) B Bryan (United States) M Bryan	6	6
(United Kingdom) K Skupski (United Kingdom) N Skupski	3	3
(Germany) A Begemann (Argentina) A Molteni	6	7^{8}
(Argentina) D Schwartzman (Czech Republic) J Veselý	3	6^{6}
(Netherlands) R Haase (United Kingdom) D Inglot	7^{7}	6
(India) J Nedunchezhiyan (Australia) M Reid	6^{3}	1
(Poland) M Matkowski (Belarus) M Mirnyi	2	7^{7}	[3]
(India) R Bopanna (Brazil) A Sá	6	6^{2}	[10]

Semifinals
1	(United States) B Bryan (United States) M Bryan	7^{7}	6
(Germany) A Begemann (Argentina) A Molteni	6^{1}	4
(Netherlands) R Haase (United Kingdom) D Inglot	6^{4}	6	[9]
(India) R Bopanna (Brazil) A Sá	7^{7}	3	[11]

Final
1	(United States) B Bryan (United States) M Bryan	6^{4}	6	[10]
(India) R Bopanna (Brazil) A Sá	7^{7}	4	[3]
