= 2017 Aegon International Eastbourne – Women's doubles =

Women's doubles
- 2017 Aegon International Eastbourne

Final
- Champions: (Chinese Taipei) Chan Yung-jan (Switzerland) Martina Hingis
- Runners-up: (Australia) Ashleigh Barty (Australia) Casey Dellacqua
- Score: 6–3, 7–5

Details
- Draw: 16
- Seeds: 4

Events
Singles	men	women
Doubles	men	women
- Eastbourne International

Darija Jurak and Anastasia Rodionova were the defending champions, but lost in the first round to Ekaterina Makarova and Elena Vesnina.

Chan Yung-jan and Martina Hingis won the title, defeating Ashleigh Barty and Casey Dellacqua in the final, 6–3, 7–5.

== Seeds ==
1. (Russia) Ekaterina Makarova / (Russia) Elena Vesnina (quarterfinals, withdrew)
2. (Chinese Taipei) Chan Yung-jan / (Switzerland) Martina Hingis (champions)
3. (Hungary) Tímea Babos / (Czech Republic) Andrea Hlaváčková (semifinals)
4. (Czech Republic) Lucie Hradecká / (Czech Republic) Kateřina Siniaková (first round)

== Draw ==
Key

- Q = Qualifier
- WC = Wild card
- LL = Lucky loser
- Alt = Alternate
- ITF = ITF entry
- PR = Protected ranking
- SR = Special ranking
- SE = Special exempt
- JE = Junior exempt
- JR = Junior Accelerator Programme entrant
- CO = College Accelerator Programme entrant
- NG = Next Gen Accelerator Program entrant
- w/o = Walkover
- r = Retired
- d = Defaulted

=== Draw ===
First round
1	(Russia) E Makarova (Russia) E Vesnina	6	6
(Croatia) D Jurak (Australia) An Rodionova	1	0
(Australia) A Barty (Australia) C Dellacqua	6	6
(Canada) G Dabrowski (China) Y Xu	2	3
3	(Hungary) T Babos (Czech Republic) A Hlaváčková	6	4	[10]
(Chinese Taipei) H-c Chan (Romania) M Niculescu	3	6	[6]
(Latvia) J Ostapenko (Slovenia) K Srebotnik	w/o
(Belgium) K Flipkens (India) S Mirza
(Slovenia) A Klepač (Spain) MJ Martínez Sánchez	4	7	[7]
(Switzerland) T Bacsinszky (Russia) S Kuznetsova	6	5	[10]
WC	(United States) N Melichar (United Kingdom) A Smith	7^{7}	6
4	(Czech Republic) L Hradecká (Czech Republic) K Siniaková	6^{5}	2
(United States) R Atawo (Poland) A Rosolska	6^{4}	1
(Germany) A-L Grönefeld (Czech Republic) K Peschke	7^{7}	6
(United States) L Davis (United States) A Riske	1	2
2	(Chinese Taipei) Y-j Chan (Switzerland) M Hingis	6	6

Quarterfinals
1	(Russia) E Makarova (Russia) E Vesnina
(Australia) A Barty (Australia) C Dellacqua	w/o
3	(Hungary) T Babos (Czech Republic) A Hlaváčková	2	6	[10]
(Latvia) J Ostapenko (Slovenia) K Srebotnik	6	0	[5]
(Switzerland) T Bacsinszky (Russia) S Kuznetsova	2^{r}
WC	(United States) N Melichar (United Kingdom) A Smith	3
(Germany) A-L Grönefeld (Czech Republic) K Peschke	2	0
2	(Chinese Taipei) Y-j Chan (Switzerland) M Hingis	6	6

Semifinals
(Australia) A Barty (Australia) C Dellacqua	6	6
3	(Hungary) T Babos (Czech Republic) A Hlaváčková	2	3
WC	(United States) N Melichar (United Kingdom) A Smith	0	1
2	(Chinese Taipei) Y-j Chan (Switzerland) M Hingis	6	6

Final
(Australia) A Barty (Australia) C Dellacqua	3	5
2	(Chinese Taipei) Y-j Chan (Switzerland) M Hingis	6	7
