= 2017 Aegon International Eastbourne =

- Date: 26 June – 1 July
- Edition: 7th (men); 43rd (women)
- Category: ATP 250 (men); WTA Premier (women)
- Draw: 28S / 16D (men); 48S / 16D (women)
- Prize money: €635,660 (men) $753,900 (women)
- Surface: Grass
- Location: Eastbourne, United Kingdom
- Venue: Devonshire Park LTC

Champions

Men's singles
- (Serbia) Novak Djokovic

Women's singles
- (Czech Republic) Karolína Plíšková

Men's doubles
- (United States) Bob Bryan / (United States) Mike Bryan

Women's doubles
- (Chinese Taipei) Chan Yung-jan / (Switzerland) Martina Hingis
- Aegon International Eastbourne

The 2017 Aegon International Eastbourne was a combined men's and women's tennis tournament played on outdoor grass courts. It was the 43rd edition of the event for women and the seventh edition for men. The tournament was classified as a WTA Premier tournament on the WTA Tour and as an ATP World Tour 250 series on the ATP Tour. The event took place at the Devonshire Park Lawn Tennis Club in Eastbourne, United Kingdom from 26 June to 1 July 2017. Novak Djokovic and Karolína Plíšková won the singles titles.

== Finals ==
=== Men's singles ===
- (Serbia) Novak Djokovic defeated (France) Gaël Monfils, 6–3, 6–4

=== Women's singles ===
- (Czech Republic) Karolína Plíšková defeated (Denmark) Caroline Wozniacki, 6–4, 6–4

=== Men's doubles ===
- (United States) Bob Bryan / (United States) Mike Bryan defeated (India) Rohan Bopanna / (Brazil) André Sá, 6–7^{(4–7)}, 6–4, [10–3]

=== Women's doubles ===
- (Chinese Taipei) Chan Yung-jan / (Switzerland) Martina Hingis defeated (Australia) Ashleigh Barty / (Australia) Casey Dellacqua, 6–3, 7–5

== Points and prize money ==
=== Point distribution ===
Event	W	F	SF	QF	Round of 16	Round of 32	Round of 48	Q	Q2	Q1
Men's singles	250	150	90	45	20	0	—N/a	12	6	0
Men's doubles	250	150	90	45	0	—N/a	—N/a	—N/a	—N/a	—N/a
Women's singles	470	305	185	100	55	30	1	25	13	1
Women's doubles	470	305	185	100	1	—N/a	—N/a	—N/a	—N/a	—N/a

=== Prize money ===
Event	W	F	SF	QF	Round of 16	Round of 32	Round of 48	Q2	Q1
Men's singles	$	$	$	$	$	$	—N/a	$	$
Women's singles	$140,400	$74,726	$37,370	$18,940	$9,850	$5,155	$3,395	$	$
Men's doubles	$	$	$	$	$	—N/a	—N/a	—N/a	—N/a
Women's doubles	$	$	$	$	$	—N/a	—N/a	—N/a	—N/a

== ATP singles main-draw entrants ==
=== Seeds ===
Country	Player	Rank^{1}	Seed
SRB	Novak Djokovic	4	1
FRA	Gaël Monfils	16	2
USA	John Isner	21	3
USA	Steve Johnson	25	4
USA	Sam Querrey	28	5
GER	Mischa Zverev	29	6
FRA	Richard Gasquet	30	7
ARG	Diego Schwartzman	36	8

- ^{1} Rankings are as of 19 June 2017.

=== Other entrants ===
The following players received wildcards into the main draw:

- (Serbia) Novak Djokovic
- (France) Gaël Monfils
- (United Kingdom) Cameron Norrie

The following players received entry from the qualifying draw:

- (Italy) Thomas Fabbiano
- (Slovakia) Norbert Gombos
- (Canada) Vasek Pospisil
- (Croatia) Franko Škugor

=== Withdrawals ===
Before the tournament

- (United Kingdom) Aljaž Bedene →replaced by (United States) Frances Tiafoe
- (Uruguay) Pablo Cuevas →replaced by (Argentina) Horacio Zeballos
- (United Kingdom) Dan Evans →replaced by (Czech Republic) Jiří Veselý
- (Spain) Feliciano López →replaced by (Serbia) Dušan Lajović
- (Germany) Florian Mayer →replaced by (United States) Jared Donaldson
- (Luxembourg) Gilles Müller →replaced by (South Africa) Kevin Anderson

== ATP doubles main-draw entrants ==
=== Seeds ===
Country	Player	Country	Player	Rank^{1}	Seed
USA	Bob Bryan	USA	Mike Bryan	18	1
~~CRO~~	~~Ivan Dodig~~	~~FRA~~	~~Édouard Roger-Vasselin~~	~~27~~	~~2~~
USA	Ryan Harrison	NZL	Michael Venus	45	3
FRA	Fabrice Martin	CAN	Daniel Nestor	58	4

- ^{1} Rankings are as of 19 June 2017.

=== Other entrants ===
The following pairs received wildcards into the doubles main draw:

- (United Kingdom) Scott Clayton / (United Kingdom) Jonny O'Mara
- (United Kingdom) Brydan Klein / (United Kingdom) Joe Salisbury

The following pair received entry as alternates:

- (Italy) Thomas Fabbiano / (Australia) Luke Saville

=== Withdrawals ===
Before the tournament

- (Croatia) Ivan Dodig

== WTA singles main-draw entrants ==
=== Seeds ===
Country	Player	Rank^{1}	Seed
GER	Angelique Kerber	1	1
ROU	Simona Halep	2	2
CZE	Karolína Plíšková	3	3
SVK	Dominika Cibulková	6	4
GBR	Johanna Konta	7	5
DEN	Caroline Wozniacki	8	6
RUS	Svetlana Kuznetsova	9	7
POL	Agnieszka Radwańska	10	8
FRA	Kristina Mladenovic	12	9
LAT	Jeļena Ostapenko	13	10
ESP	Garbiñe Muguruza	14	11
RUS	Elena Vesnina	15	12
~~CZE~~	~~Petra Kvitová~~	~~16~~	~~13~~
RUS	Anastasia Pavlyuchenkova	17	14
SUI	Timea Bacsinszky	20	15
AUS	Daria Gavrilova	21	16

- ^{1} Rankings are as of 19 June 2017.

=== Other entrants ===
The following players received wildcards into the main draw:

- (United Kingdom) Naomi Broady
- (Romania) Simona Halep
- (Germany) Angelique Kerber
- (Czech Republic) Petra Kvitová
- (United Kingdom) Heather Watson

The following players received entry from the qualifying draw:

- (Spain) Lara Arruabarrena
- (Germany) Mona Barthel
- (China) Duan Yingying
- (Chinese Taipei) Hsieh Su-wei
- (United States) Varvara Lepchenko
- (Italy) Francesca Schiavone

The following players received entry as lucky losers:

- (Paraguay) Verónica Cepede Royg
- (Romania) Sorana Cîrstea
- (United States) Lauren Davis
- (Slovakia) Kristína Kučová
- (Japan) Risa Ozaki
- (Bulgaria) Tsvetana Pironkova

=== Withdrawals ===
Before the tournament

- (United States) Catherine Bellis →replaced by (United States) Lauren Davis
- (Netherlands) Kiki Bertens →replaced by (United States) Christina McHale
- (Germany) Julia Görges →replaced by (Slovakia) Kristína Kučová
- (Russia) Daria Kasatkina →replaced by (Paraguay) Verónica Cepede Royg
- (Czech Republic) Petra Kvitová →replaced by (Bulgaria) Tsvetana Pironkova
- (Puerto Rico) Monica Puig →replaced by (Belgium) Elise Mertens
- (Czech Republic) Lucie Šafářová →replaced by (Japan) Risa Ozaki
- (Australia) Samantha Stosur → replaced by (Canada) Eugenie Bouchard
- (United States) CoCo Vandeweghe →replaced by (Romania) Sorana Cîrstea

During the tournament

- (United Kingdom) Johanna Konta (spine injury)

=== Retirements ===
- (Croatia) Ana Konjuh
- (United States) Christina McHale
- (Kazakhstan) Yulia Putintseva

== WTA doubles main-draw entrants ==
=== Seeds ===
Country	Player	Country	Player	Rank^{1}	Seed
RUS	Ekaterina Makarova	RUS	Elena Vesnina	8	1
TPE	Chan Yung-jan	SUI	Martina Hingis	9	2
HUN	Tímea Babos	CZE	Andrea Hlaváčková	19	3
CZE	Lucie Hradecká	CZE	Kateřina Siniaková	31	4

- ^{1} Rankings are as of 19 June 2017.

=== Other entrants ===
The following pair received a wildcard into the doubles main draw:

- (United States) Nicole Melichar / (United Kingdom) Anna Smith

=== Withdrawals ===
Before the tournament

- (Belgium) Kirsten Flipkens

During the tournament

- (Russia) Ekaterina Makarova
