= 2017 Fed Cup Europe/Africa Zone Group I – Pool C =

Subsection of tennis competition

Pool C of the 2017 Fed Cup Europe/Africa Zone Group I was one of four pools in the Europe/Africa zone of the 2017 Fed Cup. Four teams competed in a round robin competition, with the top team and the bottom team proceeding to their respective sections of the play-offs: the top team played for advancement to the World Group II Play-offs, while the bottom team played to avoid relegation to Group II.

== Standings ==
		GBR	TUR	LAT	POR	RR; W–L	Set; W–L	Game; W–L	Standings
23	Great Britain		3–0	3–0	3–0	3–0	18–2 (90%)	119–49 (71%)	1
29	Turkey	0–3		1–2	2–1	1–2	9–15 (38%)	103–117 (47%)	3
49	Latvia	0–3	2–1		3–0	2–1	12–9 (57%)	94–97 (49%)	2
42	Portugal	0–3	1–2	0–3		0–3	4–17 (19%)	66–119 (36%)	4

Standings are determined by: 1. number of wins; 2. if two teams have the same number of wins, head-to-head record; 3. if three teams have the same number of wins, (a) number of matches won in the group, then (b) percentage of sets won in the group, then (c) percentage of games won in the group, then (d) Fed Cup rankings.

== Round-robin ==
=== Great Britain vs. Portugal ===
Great Britain
3
Tallink Tennis Centre, Tallinn, Estonia
8 February 2017
Hard (indoors)

Portugal
0

			1	2	3
1	(United Kingdom) (Portugal)	Heather Watson; Inês Murta	6; 1	6; 1
2	(United Kingdom) (Portugal)	Johanna Konta; Michelle Larcher de Brito	6; 2	6; 4
3	(United Kingdom) (Portugal)	Jocelyn Rae / Laura Robson; Michelle Larcher de Brito / Inês Murta	6; 2	6; 3

=== Turkey vs. Latvia ===
Turkey
1
Tallink Tennis Centre, Tallinn, Estonia
8 February 2017
Hard (indoors)

Latvia
2

			1	2	3
1	(Turkey) (Latvia)	İpek Soylu; Diāna Marcinkēviča	6; 2	3; 6	6; 2
2	(Turkey) (Latvia)	Çağla Büyükakçay; Jeļena Ostapenko	6^{4} 7^{7}	7; 5	3; 6
3	(Turkey) (Latvia)	Çağla Büyükakçay / İpek Soylu; Diāna Marcinkēviča / Jeļena Ostapenko	3; 6	4; 6

=== Great Britain vs. Latvia ===
Great Britain
3
Tallink Tennis Centre, Tallinn, Estonia
9 February 2017
Hard (indoors)

Latvia
0

			1	2	3
1	(United Kingdom) (Latvia)	Heather Watson; Diāna Marcinkēviča	6; 3	6; 0
2	(United Kingdom) (Latvia)	Johanna Konta; Jeļena Ostapenko	6; 2	6; 3
3	(United Kingdom) (Latvia)	Jocelyn Rae / Laura Robson; Diāna Marcinkēviča / Daniela Vismane	6; 0	6^{2} 7^{7}	6; 2

=== Turkey vs. Portugal ===
Turkey
2
Tallink Tennis Centre, Tallinn, Estonia
9 February 2017
Hard (indoors)

Portugal
1

			1	2	3
1	(Turkey) (Portugal)	İpek Soylu; Inês Murta	5; 7	6; 1	6; 1
2	(Turkey) (Portugal)	Çağla Büyükakçay; Michelle Larcher de Brito	1; 6	6; 3	4; 6
3	(Turkey) (Portugal)	Çağla Büyükakçay / İpek Soylu; Francisca Jorge / Michelle Larcher de Brito	6^{3} 7^{7}	6; 3	6; 2

=== Great Britain vs. Turkey ===
Great Britain
3
Tallink Tennis Centre, Tallinn, Estonia
10 February 2017
Hard (indoors)

Turkey
0

			1	2	3
1	(United Kingdom) (Turkey)	Heather Watson; İpek Soylu	6; 0	6; 1
2	(United Kingdom) (Turkey)	Johanna Konta; Çağla Büyükakçay	5; 7	6; 4	6; 3
3	(United Kingdom) (Turkey)	Jocelyn Rae / Laura Robson; Ayla Aksu / Pemra Özgen	6; 2	6; 2

=== Latvia vs. Portugal ===
Latvia
3
Tallink Tennis Centre, Tallinn, Estonia
10 February 2017
Hard (indoors)

Portugal
0

			1	2	3
1	(Latvia) (Portugal)	Diāna Marcinkēviča; Inês Murta	6; 1	6; 2
2	(Latvia) (Portugal)	Jeļena Ostapenko; Michelle Larcher de Brito	6; 4	6; 2
3	(Latvia) (Portugal)	Jeļena Ostapenko / Daniela Vismane; Francisca Jorge / Rita Vilaça	6; 2	7^{7} 6^{3}
