= Karolína Plíšková =

Czech tennis player (born 1992)

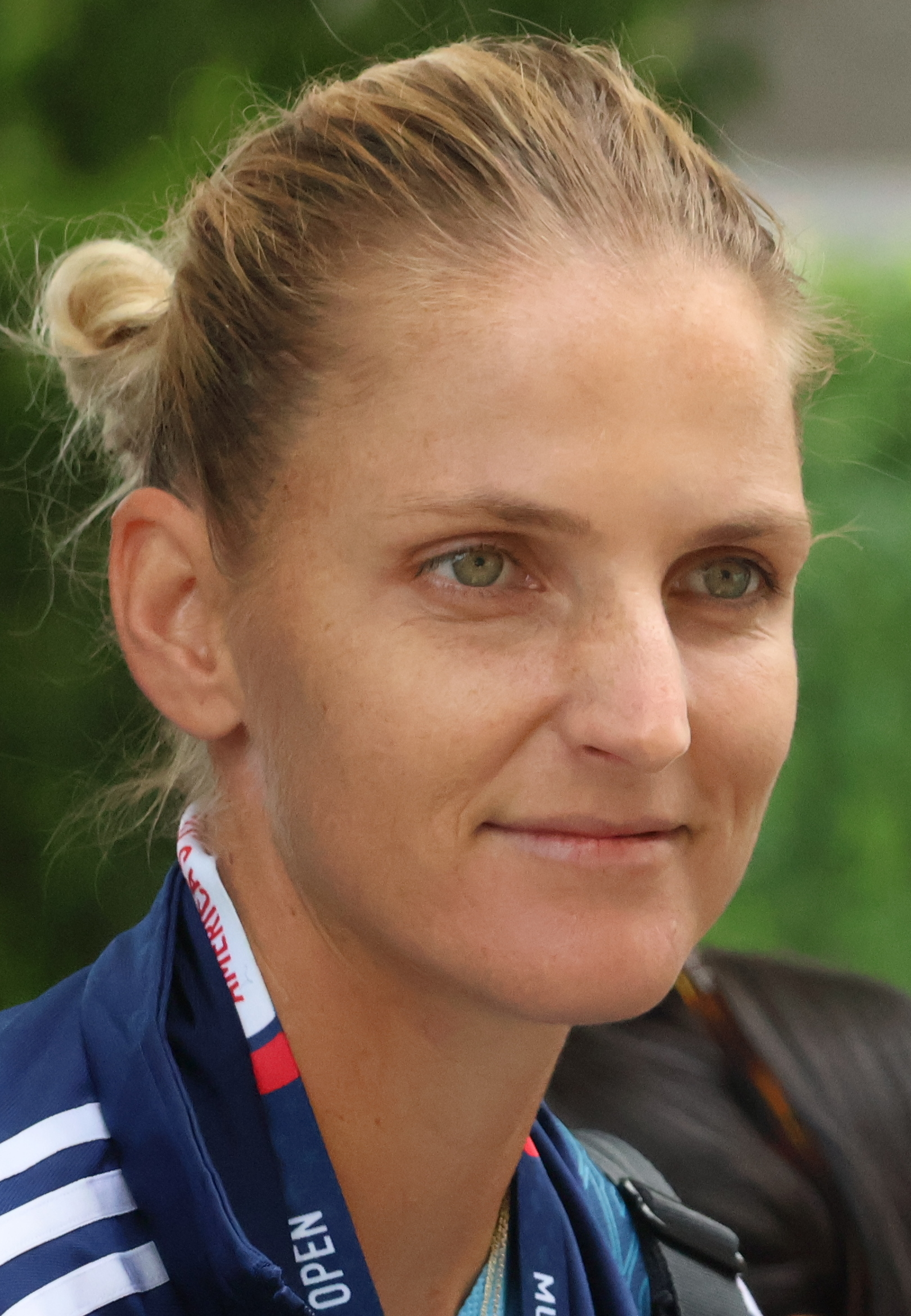
- Plíšková at the 2024 Washington Open
- Country (sports): Czech Republic
- Residence: Monte Carlo, Monaco
- Born: 21 March 1992 (age 34) Louny, Czechoslovakia
- Height: 1.86 m (6 ft 1 in)
- Turned pro: 2009
- Plays: Right-handed (two-handed backhand)
- Coach: Željko Krajan (2024–)
- Prize money: US$26,775,465 (15th all-time in earnings)
- Official website: karolina-pliskova.com

Singles
- Career record: 641–372
- Career titles: 17
- Highest ranking: No. 1 (17 July 2017)
- Current ranking: No. 74 (22 June 2026)

Grand Slam singles results
- Australian Open: SF (2019)
- French Open: SF (2017)
- Wimbledon: F (2021)
- US Open: F (2016)

Other tournaments
- Tour Finals: SF (2017, 2018, 2019)
- Olympic Games: 3R (2020)

Doubles
- Career record: 184–146
- Career titles: 5
- Highest ranking: No. 11 (31 October 2016)

Grand Slam doubles results
- Australian Open: SF (2016)
- French Open: QF (2021)
- Wimbledon: SF (2016)
- US Open: 3R (2016, 2023)

Grand Slam mixed doubles results
- Wimbledon: 2R (2014)

Team competitions
- Fed Cup: W (2015, 2016, 2018)
- Hopman Cup: RR (2016)
- Last updated on: 25 June 2026.

Karolína Plíšková (Czech pronunciation: [ˈkaroliːna ˈpliːʃkovaː]; born 21 March 1992) is a Czech professional tennis player. She has been ranked as the world No. 1 in women's singles by the WTA, achieved in July 2017, and No. 11 in doubles. Plíšková has won 17 singles and five doubles titles on the WTA Tour. She is a two-time major finalist at the 2016 US Open and the 2021 Wimbledon Championships.

As a junior, Plíšková won the 2010 Australian Open girls' singles title. Playing for the Czech Republic in Billie Jean King Cup competition, she has scored a win-loss record of 15–8 (as of September 2024). (Note: Karolína Plíšková at the Billie Jean King Cup (archived)) She is known for her powerful serve and forehand.

== Personal life ==
Plíšková was born in Louny, Czechoslovakia (now the Czech Republic) to Radek Plíšek and Martina Plíšková, and has an identical twin sister, Kristýna, who is two minutes older and is also a tennis player. She currently lives in Monte Carlo. In 2018, she married Michal Hrdlička and subsequently changed her name to Karolína Hrdličková (Czech pronunciation: [ˈkaroliːna ˈɦr̩dlitʃkovaː]).

== Career ==
=== 2010: Juniors ===
Karolína Plíšková won the Australian Open junior title, defeating Laura Robson in the girls' final. (Note: To obtain data from this reference, select the corresponding year on the WTA or ITF website.)

=== 2012: Major debut ===
Plíšková played her first senior Grand Slam tournament main draw at the 2012 French Open. To qualify, she defeated Dia Evtimova, Tamaryn Hendler and Laura Robson. She lost in the first round to world No. 8, Marion Bartoli, in straight sets.

=== 2013: First WTA Tour title ===
Plíšková started the year in Brisbane International. She however lost to Olga Puchkova in the first round in two sets. Then in her next tournament in Sydney she qualified, beating Alexandra Panova, Irina Falconi and Estrella Cabeza Candela. In the first round she lost to the third seed, Sara Errani.

Plíšková won her maiden WTA Tour title at the Malaysian Open. She defeated several seeded players to reach the final against Bethanie Mattek-Sands, defeating her in three sets.

At the Generali Ladies Linz in October, Plíšková won her first career title in doubles alongside sister Kristýna, becoming the first set of twins in history to win a doubles title together on the tour.

=== 2014: Breakthrough, two titles, top 25 debut ===
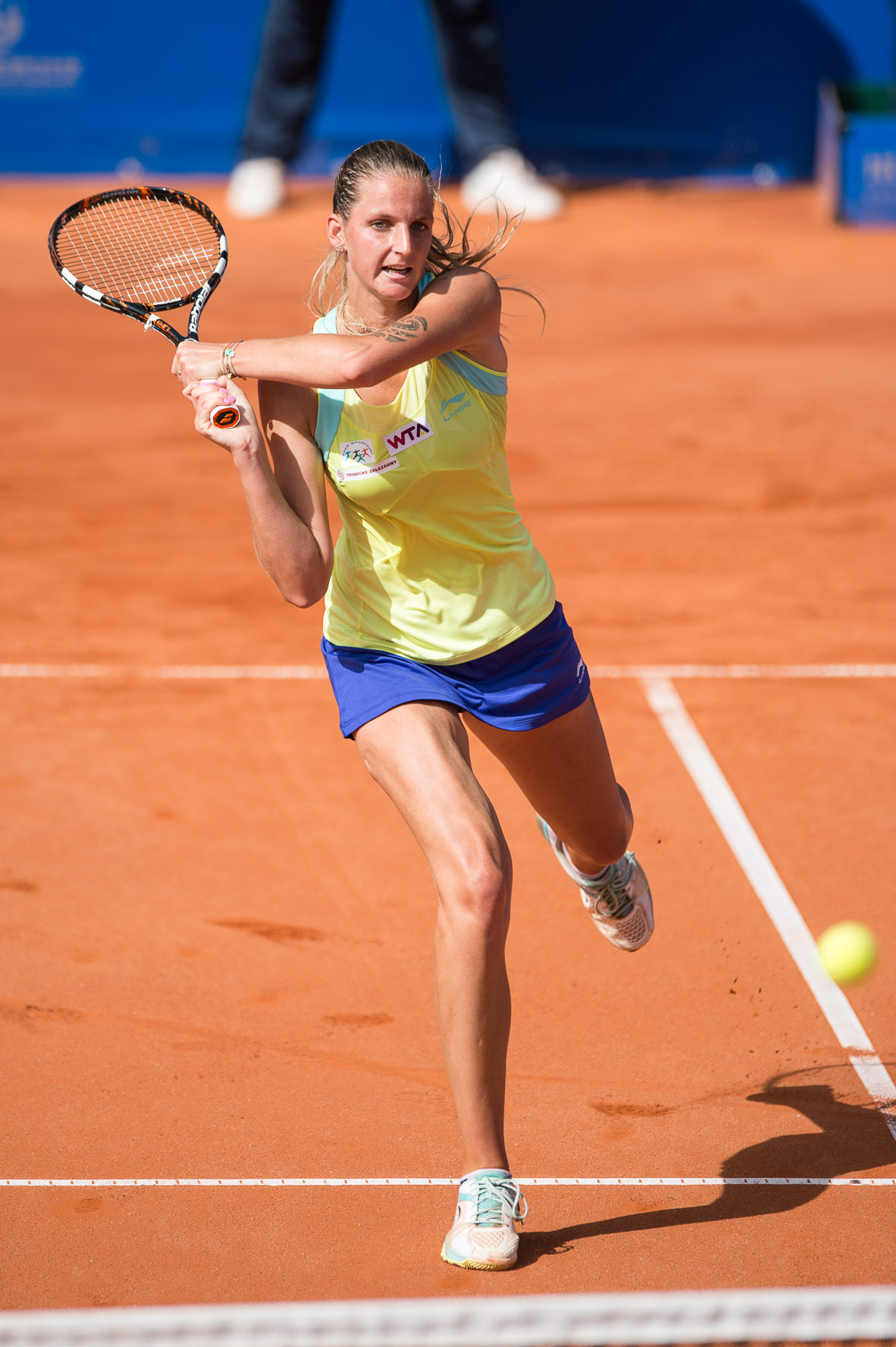
Plíšková at the 2014 Nürnberger Versicherungscup

2014 was a breakthrough year for Plíšková. After consecutive second-round finishes in Auckland and at the Australian Open, she reached her second career WTA tour final in Pattaya City, defeating top-50 players Bethanie Mattek-Sands and Sorana Cîrstea before losing to Ekaterina Makarova in the final. She then reached the third round of Indian Wells, the quarterfinals of the Monterrey Open and the semifinals in Kuala Lumpur between March and April. In May, she reached her third career final in Nuremberg, losing to second seed Eugenie Bouchard in three sets. She broke into the top-50 in July and defeated world No. 9, Ana Ivanovic, in the second round of the US Open. After playing in America, she reached two finals in two consecutive weeks – in Hong Kong, where she lost to Sabine Lisicki, and in Seoul, which she won, defeating Varvara Lepchenko in the final to take her second career title. In October, she won her third title and second of the year in Linz. As an alternate, Plíšková made a round-robin appearance at the season-closing Tournament of Champions, in lieu of top seed Ekaterina Makarova, losing her sole match against Flavia Pennetta.

After reaching five finals and winning two of them, and appearing to a broader public at the US Open with a big win over a former world No. 1, 2014 was a breakthrough year for Plíšková. She leapt from world No. 67 to No. 24.

=== 2015: Top 10 debut ===
Plíšková began her year at the Brisbane International where she defeated former world No. 1 and two-time Grand Slam champion, Victoria Azarenka, in the first round before losing in the second. She reached her first WTA Premier-level final at the Sydney International defeating Carla Suárez Navarro and Angelique Kerber, before losing to fellow Czech, Petra Kvitová, in two tie-breaking sets. As a consequence of this run, she broke into the world's top 20 for the first time in her career.

At the first major event of the year in Australia, Plíšková reached the third round, before losing to Ekaterina Makarova.

She made her debut for the Czech team in the first round of the 2015 Fed Cup World Group in February, winning both of her rubbers against Françoise Abanda and Gabriela Dabrowski of Canada to help the Czechs to a 4–0 win in Québec.

As the eighth seed, Plíšková reached semifinals at Antwerp, before losing to eventual runner-up Carla Suárez Navarro. She then played at the 2015 Dubai Championships and reached the final as the 17th seed, along the way beating No. 4 seed Ana Ivanovic, fellow Czech Lucie Šafářová, and the rising Spaniard Garbiñe Muguruza. She lost in the final against top seed Simona Halep.

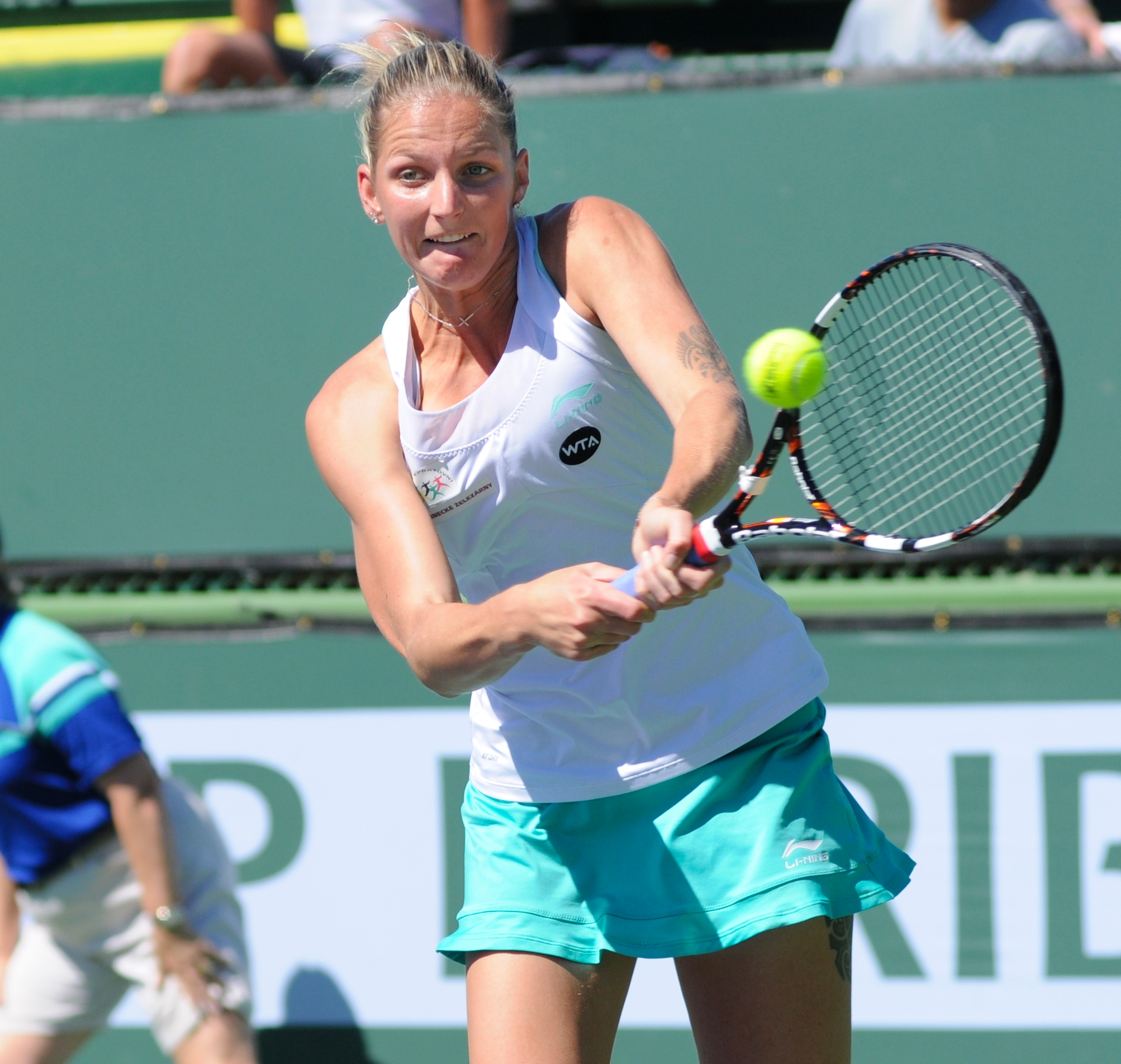
Plíšková at the 2015 Indian Wells Open

Plíšková then played in Indian Wells where she won a rematch with Muguruza in the third round, before losing again to Halep. In Miami, Plíšková reached the quarterfinals where she lost to Andrea Petkovic. She was the top seed in her home tournament in Prague and reached the final by defeating Annika Beck, Tsvetana Pironkova, Denisa Allertová and Yanina Wickmayer, going to a third set in three of her four matches. In the final, she defeated fellow Czech Lucie Hradecká in another three-set battle to claim her fourth career title.

At the Madrid Open she beat Sílvia Soler Espinosa in the first round, but lost to Caroline Garcia in the second. At the Italian Open she lost in the first round to Timea Bacsinszky in straight sets. She lost in the second round of French Open as 12th seed to unseeded Andreea Mitu in straight sets after beating Zhang Shuai in the first round.

She reached another final at Birmingham Classic losing to Angelique Kerber, in three sets. She lost to Agnieszka Radwańska at the Eastbourne International in the third round. At Wimbledon, Plíšková defeated Irina Falconi in three sets before losing to CoCo Vandeweghe in the second round.

She made another final at Stanford Classic, losing once again to Angelique Kerber. Plíšková lost in the first round at Canadian Open to Mirjana Lučić-Baroni and in the third round of the Western & Southern Open to Jelena Janković and reached the quarterfinals of the Connecticut Open, losing to Lesia Tsurenko. Seeded eighth at the US Open, Plíšková suffered a shocking loss to Anna Tatishvili in the first round.

She made another two quarterfinals at Pan Pacific Open and Wuhan Open, losing to Agnieszka Radwańska and Roberta Vinci, respectively, but lost in the first round of China Open to Sloane Stephens, in straight sets. Her next tournament was the Tianjin Open where she reached the semifinals, losing to Radwańska for the third time in 2015. She lost in the second round of the Kremlin Cup to Anastasija Sevastova.

She reached a tour-leading sixth final at the WTA Elite Trophy but lost to Venus Williams in straight sets. She ended the year ranked No. 11 in singles. Plíšková played as Czech No. 2 in the Fed Cup Finals, losing to Maria Sharapova on Saturday. The following day, she defeated Anastasia Pavlyuchenkova in singles and won the deciding doubles rubber with Barbora Strýcová, against Pavlyuchenkova and Elena Vesnina, to win her first Fed Cup title.

=== 2016: US Open final, top 5, rise in doubles ===
Plíšková began her season at the 2016 Hopman Cup, where she partnered with Jiří Veselý to represent the Czech Republic. She recorded singles wins over Jarmila Wolfe and Victoria Duval.

She reached quarterfinals in Sydney by defeating Ana Ivanovic and Anastasia Pavlyuchenkova, both in straight sets, but lost to world No. 2, Simona Halep, in straight sets. At the Australian Open, Plíšková defeated Kimberly Birrell and Julia Görges (both in straight sets) in the first two rounds. However, she again lost to Makarova, who defeated her at the same round at last year's Australian Open. After the tournament, she competed in Fed Cup and earned important wins over Simona Halep and Monica Niculescu in Czech Republic's tie against Romania.

Her next tournament was the Dubai Tennis Championships, where she was defending the previous year's points as a finalist; however, she fell to CoCo Vandeweghe, in straight sets. Struggles continued as she lost to Margarita Gasparyan in the first round of the Qatar Ladies Open.

After receiving a first-round bye in Indian Wells, Plíšková defeated Shelby Rogers and Ana Ivanovic, both in straight sets. She then defeated Johanna Konta in three sets and earned another straight sets win over rising star Daria Kasatkina, before losing in three sets to eventual champion Victoria Azarenka. Despite her good campaign in Indian Wells, Plíšková lost in the second round of the Miami Open to Tímea Babos after another first-round bye.

Plíšková opened her clay-court season at the Porsche Tennis Grand Prix. She defeated the 2015 French Open finalist Lucie Šafářová in the first round in three sets and Ana Ivanovic in straight sets. However, she would fall to the top seed Agnieszka Radwańska in the third round. She next competed at the Prague Open. She cruised by Stefanie Vögele, Kateřina Siniaková, and Camila Giorgi in the first three rounds. However, she would lose in straight sets to Lucie Šafářová in the semifinals. Plíšková lost in the second round of the Madrid Open to Madison Keys in straight sets and fell in the first round of the Italian Open to Daria Kasatkina. Her clay-court season would come to a disappointing end as she would lose to the 108th ranked player in the world, Shelby Rogers, in the first round of the French Open.

Plíšková won her first title of the year at the Nottingham Open. After a three set match with Anastasija Sevastova in the first round, she cruised to the final and beat Alison Riske for her first grass title. She then lost in the first round of the Birmingham Classic to Barbora Strýcová and reached the final of the Eastbourne International which she lost to Dominika Cibulková. At Wimbledon, Plíšková beat Yanina Wickmayer in three sets before losing to Misaki Doi in the second round.

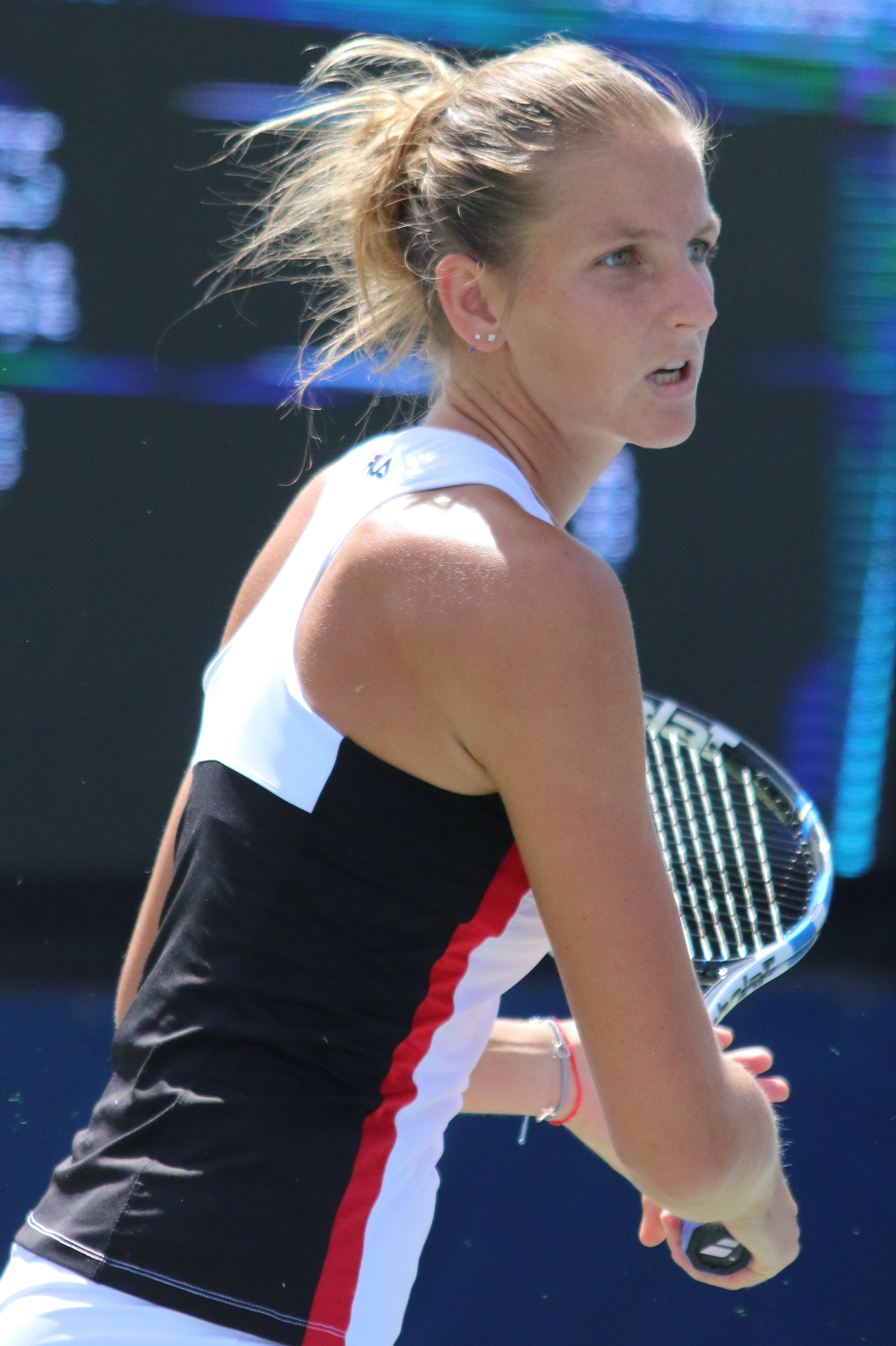
Plíšková at the 2016 US Open

Plíšková began her hardcourt season at the Rogers Cup, where she beat Kateryna Bondarenko and Sara Errani (who had to withdraw from the match) before losing in straight sets to eventual champion Simona Halep. She then pulled out of the Olympics. Plíšková won her maiden WTA Premier tournament at the Western & Southern Open, defeating Germany's Angelique Kerber in straight sets in the final. Her victory denied Kerber the opportunity to take over the world No. 1 ranking from Serena Williams and enabled Williams to tie Steffi Graf's record of 186 consecutive weeks at No. 1. At the US Open, Plíšková beat wildcard Sofia Kenin, qualifier Montserrat González and Anastasia Pavlyuchenkova en route to her first major round of 16, where she defeated sixth seed and two-time champion, Venus Williams, in three sets and ensured her first ever major quarterfinal where she faced Ana Konjuh. She beat the Croatian in straight sets and reached her first major semifinal, where she beat Serena Williams in straight sets to reach the final. In the final, she lost to incoming No. 1, Angelique Kerber, despite winning the second set and being 3–1 up in the final set.

Plíšková continued the season with playing in Asia and the first tournament was in Tokyo, however she lost in the first match to qualifier Aliaksandra Sasnovich. In the next tournament in Wuhan she had bye in the first round, and in the second round she defeated countrywoman Lucie Šafářová and then easily lost to Dominika Cibulková. Her run ended in the third round in Beijing. In the first round, she met Šafářová again and beat her in three sets and then won over Daria Kasatkina by winning 9–7 in tie-break third set. Then she lost to Johanna Konta in three sets.

Plíšková qualified for 2016 WTA Finals and was in the group with Agnieszka Radwańska, Garbiñe Muguruza and Svetlana Kuznetsova. The first match was against Muguruza, which Plíšková won and had to face Muguruza's matchpoints. In other matches the opponents were more successful and Plíšková ended the tournament in Singapore with one win and two losses. Plíšková played her final matches of 2016 in the Fed Cup Final in France. She beat Kristina Mladenovic in the first singles rubber, which saw the third set end in a score of 14–12. This was the longest rubber in a Fed Cup Final, in terms of games played. In the next singles rubber against Caroline Garcia, Plíšková lost in three sets. The tie was even after the four singles rubbers, setting up a decisive doubles contest in which Plíšková partnered with Barbora Strýcová to defeat the WTA No. 1 ranked doubles team of Mladenovic/Garcia. With this victory over France, Plíšková and her Czech teammates completed a Fed Cup hat trick. It was also the second consecutive year that Plíšková and Strýcová won a decisive doubles rubber in the final.

At the end of the season she changed coaches. Jiří Vaněk was substituted by David Kotyza, former coach of compatriot and two-time Wimbledon champion Petra Kvitová.

=== 2017: French Open semifinal, world No. 1 ===
In 2017, Plíšková started the season by playing in Brisbane, where she beat Yulia Putintseva and qualifier Asia Muhammad in two sets and then Roberta Vinci in three sets. She then defeated Elina Svitolina and Alizé Cornet (both in straight sets) and won her seventh title.

At the 2017 Australian Open, she defeated Sara Sorribes Tormo and Anna Blinkova and beat Jeļena Ostapenko in three sets despite being down 2–5 in the third. In the fourth round she defeated Daria Gavrilova and reached her second straight Grand Slam quarterfinal, where she was defeated by unseeded Mirjana Lučić-Baroni, in three sets. Her ranking increased to a career-high of No. 3 in the world.

In February, Plíšková played first round of Fed Cup against Spain in Ostrava. She defeated Lara Arruabarrena and Garbiñe Muguruza, both in straight sets. Her next tournament was Doha, where she had a bye in the first round. She played against Caroline Garcia in the second round and revenged the loss from the end of 2016 with a straight sets win. Then she played two matches in one day due to rain and won both of them. The quarterfinal against Zhang Shuai lasted overall about seven hours. However, she outlasted Shuai in two sets before edging No. 5 Dominika Cibulková in three sets, a match in which she hit a career-best 21 aces to beat the Slovak for the first time. In the final, she beat Caroline Wozniacki in straight sets to win her eighth WTA Tour title. Plíšková lost in the second round to Kristina Mladenovic in Dubai.

In the second round of the Indian Wells Open, she defeated Monica Puig in three sets in a match full of errors. Although Plíšková's performance was not so confident, she defeated Irina-Camelia Begu in two sets, Timea Bacsinszky, who retired at the end of the sixth game, and Garbiñe Muguruza in two tie-breaks. In the semifinal against Svetlana Kuznetsova, Plíšková fell in straight tie-breaks. She reached the semifinals of the Miami Open, recording straight-set victories against qualifier Madison Brengle, Yulia Putintseva, countrywoman Barbora Strýcová, and Mirjana Lučić-Baroni, before falling to Caroline Wozniacki in three sets.

Plíšková kicked off the clay-court season in Stuttgart, where she defeated CoCo Vandeweghe in straight sets, but then lost in the quarterfinals to eventual champion Laura Siegemund. She then lost in the first round of home tournament Prague to Camila Giorgi. She also reached her first quarterfinals in Rome. In the first round she beat Lauren Davis, then Timea Bacsinszky, before losing to eventual champion Elina Svitolina in straight sets which was also her first defeat to Svitolina in her career. At the 2017 French Open, she beat Zheng Saisai, Ekaterina Alexandrova, and Carina Witthöft before winning a close fourth-round match against Verónica Cepede Royg. She then defeated Caroline Garcia to set up a semifinal encounter with Simona Halep, which she lost in three sets. The defeat prevented her from claiming the world No. 1 ranking at the conclusion of the tournament.

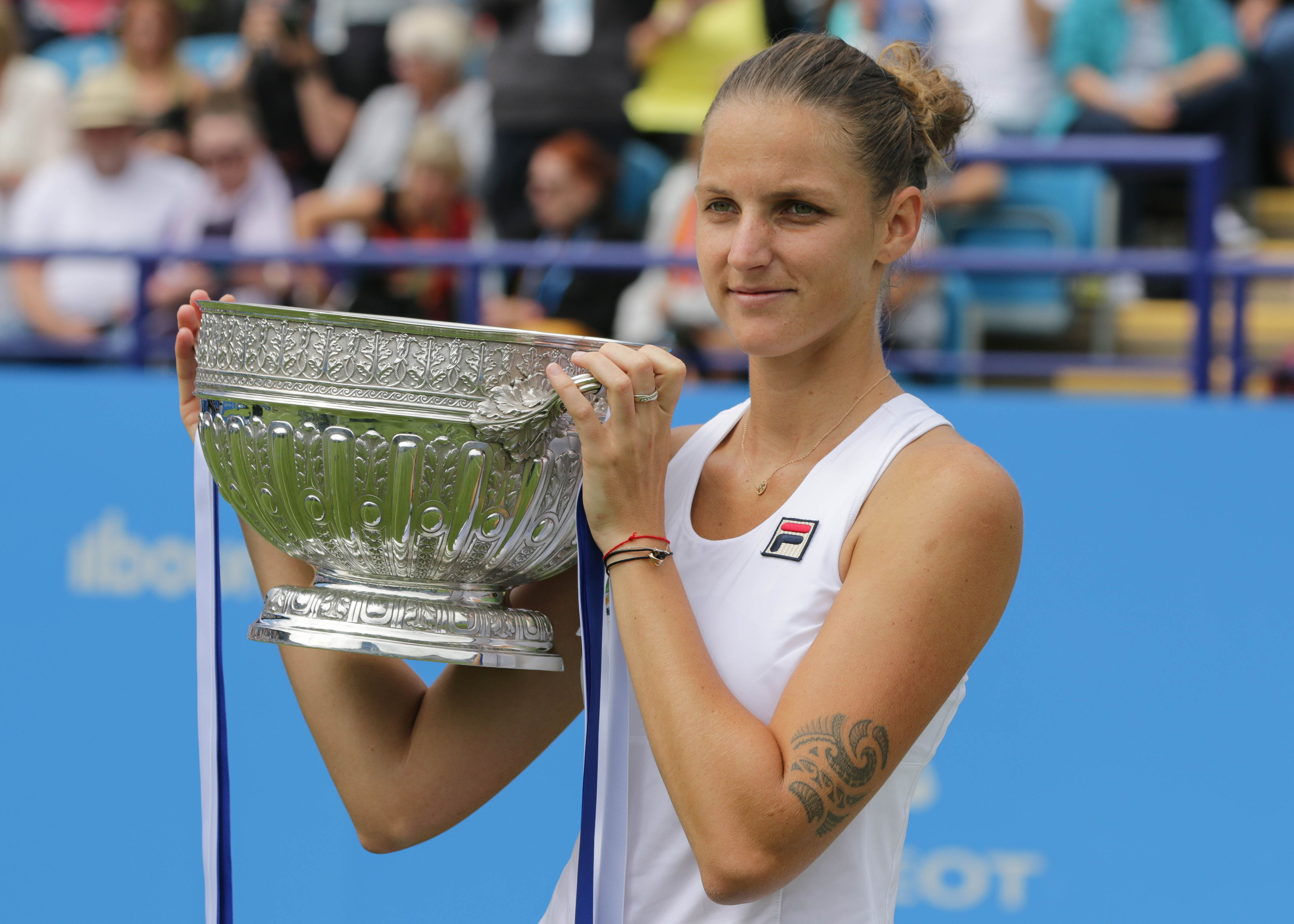
Plíšková after winning the 2017 Eastbourne International

For the 2017 grass-court season, Plíšková attended the Eastbourne International as the third seed at the end of June and won the tournament after defeating Caroline Wozniacki in the final in straight sets. At Wimbledon, Plíšková was again regarded as one of the pre-tournament favourites following her Eastbourne victory, but she suffered an unexpected second-round exit after losing in three-sets to world No. 87 Magdaléna Rybáriková, which made her the highest-ranked player to exit the draw at that point. However, on 17 July, after Simona Halep lost in the quarterfinals at Wimbledon, Plíšková reached the world No. 1 ranking for the first time in her career. She became the sixth player to reach the No. 1 position without having won a major and the first female player representing the Czech Republic to achieve the feat. Czechoslovak-born Martina Navratilova had also achieved a WTA world No. 1 ranking, but was already representing the United States when she first topped the rankings in 1978.

Plíšková attained solid results during the U.S. summer swing, reaching the quarterfinals and semifinals of the Canadian Open and the Western & Southern Open, respectively. Pliskova participated in the US Open, where she was the top seed for the first time in a major. Plíšková easily defeated Magda Linette in straight sets in the first round, and outlasted American Nicole Gibbs after dropping the first set. In the third round she made a comeback after being a set down and facing match point in the second set to defeat 27th seed Zhang Shuai. She defeated Jennifer Brady by dropping just one game and advanced to the quarterfinals. Plíšková lost to CoCo Vandeweghe in straight sets in the quarterfinals of the US Open.

At the Pan Pacific Open, she defeated Magda Linette before losing to Angelique Kerber. At the Wuhan Open, Plíšková reached the quarterfinal stage, before losing to Ashleigh Barty in three sets. At the China Open, she defeated Carla Suárez Navarro and Andrea Petkovic to reach the third round, where she lost to Sorana Cîrstea. At the WTA Finals, Plíšková defeated Venus Williams in straight sets, and then faced Garbiñe Muguruza whom she also defeated in straight sets. These victories ensured that she would reach the semifinals of the WTA Finals for the first time. She then lost to Caroline Wozniacki in straight sets.

=== 2018: Australian and US Open quarterfinals ===
In Brisbane, Plíšková lost in the semifinals to Elina Svitolina. At the Australian Open, she reached quarterfinals for the second time, having defeated Verónica Cepede Royg, Beatriz Haddad Maia, Lucie Šafářová and Barbora Strýcová. In the quarterfinals, she lost to Halep in straight sets. In Doha, she reached the third round, after receiving a first-round bye and defeating Alizé Cornet in second round in straight sets. In round three, she fell to American teenager Cici Bellis in straight sets, thus failing to defend her title. In Dubai, after receiving first round bye, she defeated Suárez Navarro in three sets in the second round. In the quarterfinals, she was defeated by Angelique Kerber in straight sets. In Indian Wells, Plisková reached the quarterfinals where she lost to eventual champion, Naomi Osaka. At the following tournament, the Miami Open, Plíšková was defeated by wildcard and former champion Victoria Azarenka in the quarterfinals.

Then Plíšková reached the quarterfinals in Dubai, Indian Wells and Miami. In April, she won the Stuttgart Open, defeating CoCo Vandeweghe in the final. She also reached the semifinals of Madrid, losing to Petra Kvitová.

Plíšková defeated the newly crowned US Open champion Naomi Osaka to take Pan Pacific Open, her 11th career title.

=== 2019: Grand Slam semifinal, second Premier-5 title ===
Plíšková opened her season at the Brisbane International, seeded fifth. She defeated Yulia Putintseva, Marie Bouzková, Ajla Tomljanović, Donna Vekić, and Lesia Tsurenko to win the title.

Plíšková was seeded seventh at the 2019 Australian Open. She defeated qualifier Karolína Muchová, Madison Brengle, 27th seed Camila Giorgi, and 18th seed Garbiñe Muguruza to reach her third consecutive quarterfinal at the tournament. There, she faced 16th seed Serena Williams, who had defeated top seed Simona Halep in the previous round. After going up a set and a break, Plíšková lost ground to Serena and found herself facing match point at five games to one in the third set. However, she pulled off a stunning comeback, winning six consecutive games and saving three additional match points at 5–4 to win the set 7–5. She thus advanced to her first Australian Open semifinal, which she lost the next day to fourth seed Naomi Osaka, in three sets.

Plíšková managed to carry her momentum through the early hardcourt season, making the quarterfinals in both Dubai and Indian Wells. She then managed to reach her first career Premier Mandatory final at the Miami Open, after defeating Simona Halep in the semifinals. However, she was defeated in the final by Ash Barty in straight sets.

Plíšková got off to a disappointing start to the clay-court season, losing to former world No. 1, Victoria Azarenka, in her opening match in Stuttgart and Ukrainian qualifier Kateryna Kozlova in the second round in Madrid. She rebounded, however, to win the biggest clay-court title of her career, and her second career Premier-5 title, at the Italian Open, avenging her previous defeat against Victoria Azarenka by defeating her in the quarterfinals, before beating Maria Sakkari in the semifinals and Johanna Konta in the final. Plíšková rose back up to No. 2 in the rankings following her victory. At the French Open, she was seeded second and had an opportunity to take over the world No. 1 ranking from Osaka if she reached the final. However, despite being labeled a heavy favorite, she was upset in the third round by the 31st seed Petra Martić.

At the Birmingham Classic in June, she and her sister Kristýna became the first identical twins in WTA history to play each other in a main-draw match. Karolina lost to her sister, who was ranked 112th.

Plíšková's final grass-court warmup tournament before Wimbledon was at the Eastbourne International, where she defeated Margarita Gasparyan, Elise Mertens, Ekaterina Alexandrova, Kiki Bertens and Angelique Kerber all in straight sets to pick up her 14th career title and her second at Eastbourne. She reached the last 16 at Wimbledon, but was upset by the unseeded Karolína Muchová, with the match going to 13–11 in the final set.

=== 2020: Mixed results ===
At Brisbane, Plíšková defeated Ajla Tomljanović, Alison Riske, Naomi Osaka, and Madison Keys to successfully defend her title, and set a record for the most Brisbane International titles. At the Australian Open, she defeated Kristina Mladenovic and Laura Siegemund, before falling to Anastasia Pavlyuchenkova in the third round. At Dubai, Plíšková defeated Kristina Mladenovic, losing just three games, before losing in the quarterfinals to eventual finalist Elena Rybakina. She next competed at Doha, where she defeated Bernarda Pera before losing to Ons Jabeur. Before the suspension of the WTA Tour due to the COVID-19 pandemic, Plíšková was ranked No. 3 in the world.

Her first tournament following the suspension was the Western & Southern Open where, as the top seed, she lost to Veronika Kudermetova in the second round. At the US Open, she defeated Anhelina Kalinina, before losing to Caroline Garcia in the second round.

She reached the final at Rome, where she was the defending champion, defeating Barbora Strýcová, Anna Blinkova, Elise Mertens, and Markéta Vondroušová, before retiring in the final against Simona Halep. At the French Open, she defeated Mayar Sherif in the first round, before losing to former champion Jeļena Ostapenko in the second round. Plíšková's final event of the year was at her home tournament of Ostrava, where, in receipt of a second round bye, she lost to Kudermetova for the second time in the year. Plíšková ended the year ranked No. 6 in the world.

=== 2021: Wimbledon final, fifth consecutive WTA Finals, back to top 3 ===
Plíšková's first tournament of the year was at Abu Dhabi. She defeated lucky loser Despina Papamichail in the first round. In the second round, Plíšková was defeated by qualifier and world No. 292, Anastasia Gasanova, in straight sets, despite this being Gasanova's first appearance in a WTA Tour main draw. This was Plíšková's worst defeat by ranking since 2013.

At the Australian Open warmup tournament, Plíšková received a first-round bye and defeated Elisabetta Cocciaretto in straight sets. In the third round, she was defeated by Danielle Collins, 7–6, 7–6. At the Australian Open, she defeated Jasmine Paolini in the first round, before avenging defeat against Collins in the second round, to the loss of just nine games across both matches. In the third round, she faced Karolína Muchová for the first time since her shock defeat at Wimbledon in 2019. Muchová won the first set 7–5, and then Plíšková raced to a 5–0 lead in the second. Plíšková then lost seven games in a row, being defeated by Muchová in straight sets. This extended Plíšková's streak in losing at Grand Slam tournaments before the quarterfinals to seven consecutive slams.

At Doha, Plíšková defeated Ons Jabeur in three sets in the second round, before losing to Jessica Pegula. At Dubai, she defeated Anastasija Sevastova, before losing again to Pegula. At Miami, where she was a defending finalist, she defeated Zheng Saisai, before losing for the third time to Pegula in the third round. As a result of her early loss, Plíšková's ranking fell to No. 9 in the world, her lowest ranking since August 2018.

At the Italian Open, Plíšková saved match points against Jeļena Ostapenko in the quarterfinals to ultimately reach her third straight Italian Open final. She lost in the final to reigning French Open champion Iga Świątek, 0–6, 0–6, in the most lopsided defeat in a tournament final of her career and the shortest completed final since Istanbul 2009. It was also the first double bagel to decide the Rome title, and the most one-sided Italian Open final since 1983.

At the 2021 French Open, Plíšková partnered with twin sister Kristýna and reached the quarterfinals of a Grand Slam in doubles for the first time in their careers when playing together. She had less success in singles after she was upset by Sloane Stephens in the second round.

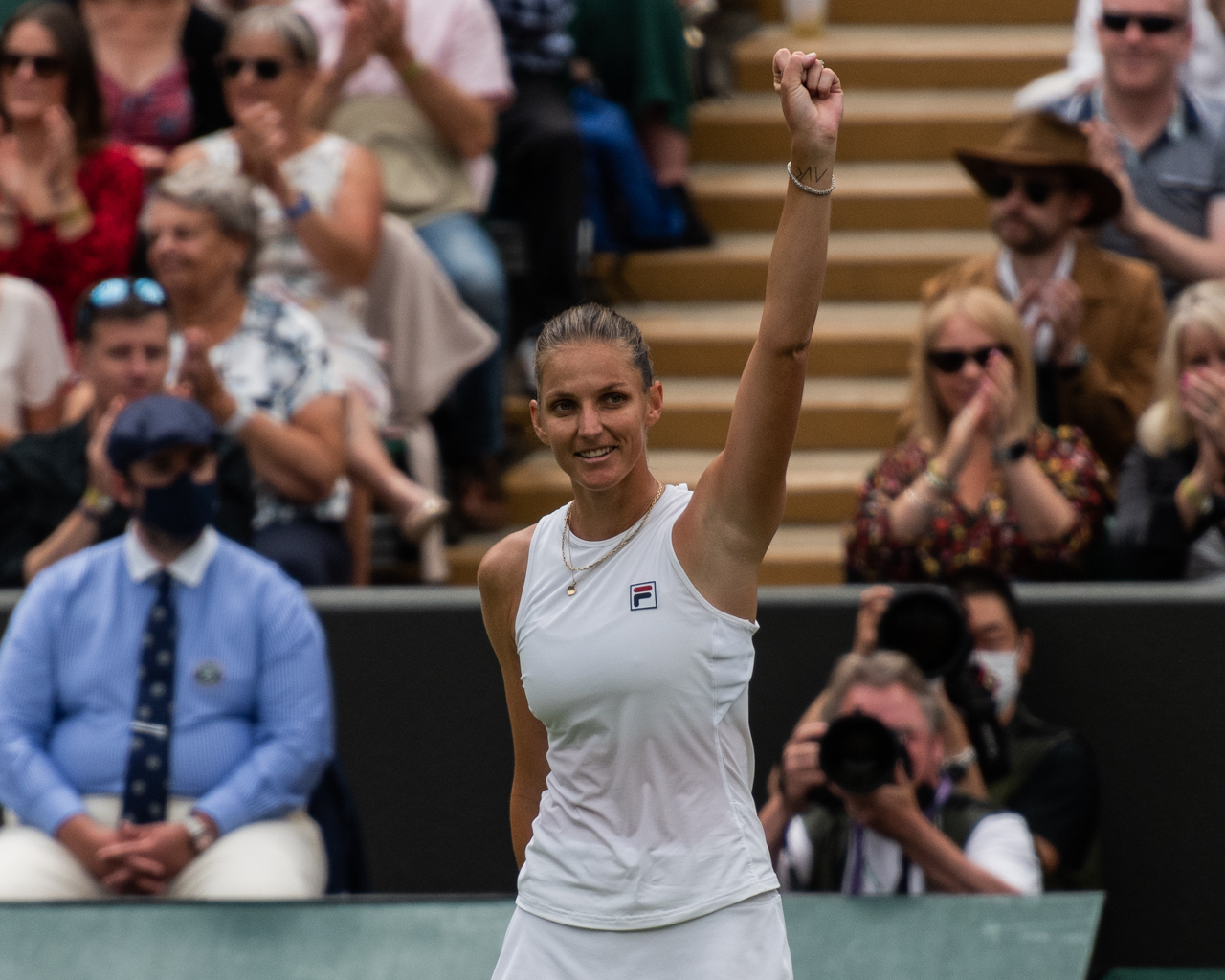
Plíšková at the 2021 Wimbledon Championships

Her struggles continued into the year's grass season. She headed to the Eastbourne International tournament as the defending champion, but crashed out in the first round to Camila Giorgi, in straight sets. As a result, she left the top 10 in the WTA rankings for the first time since August 2016. However, Plíšková's fortunes turned around at the 2021 Wimbledon Championships. She reached the quarterfinals and semifinals for the first time at this major, defeating wildcard Ludmilla Samsonova and Viktorija Golubic respectively. With her quarterfinal victory, Plíšková had reached the semifinal stage or better of all four Grand Slam events and became the sixth active female player to have reached all the majors semifinals after Serena and Venus Williams, Victoria Azarenka, Simona Halep, and Kim Clijsters. She went on to reach her first Wimbledon final and second ever Grand Slam final since the 2016 US Open after defeating second seed Aryna Sabalenka in three sets. She was later defeated by Ashleigh Barty in the final, 6–3, 6–7, 6–3, but by finishing runner-up, she returned to the top 10.

In late July, Plíšková made her first Olympics appearance at the 2020 Summer Olympics and was the fifth seed going into the singles tournament. She eased past Alizé Cornet in straight sets and Carla Suárez Navarro in three sets, but lost to Camila Giorgi in the third round in straight sets.

For the beginning of the US Open Series, Plíšková attended the Canadian Open as the fourth seed. After defeating Donna Vekić and Amanda Anisimova, she landed Sara Sorribes Tormo in the quarterfinal, whom she beat in straight sets. For the semifinal, Plíšková faced a rematch with top seed Aryna Sabalenka, whom she had already beaten in the Wimbledon semifinal just two months prior; this time, she beat Sabalenka in straight sets after breaking early in the match and just losing the lead once in the second set, before breaking back to seal the win. This victory meant Plíšková had reached her seventh WTA 1000 final and first final at this tournament. She faced Camila Giorgi in the final, their third match against each other for the year, and lost once more in straight sets. By reaching the final, Plíšková reentered the top 5 of the WTA singles rankings at world No. 4 on 16 August 2021.

Plíšková's next tournament was the Cincinnati Open, where she entered as the fifth seed and received a first-round bye. In the second round, she defeated Yulia Putintseva in straight sets, before facing Jessica Pegula for the fifth time in the year. For the first time, Plíškova defeated Pegula, doing so in straight sets; in the process, she came back from a 1–4 deficit in the first set, and a 0–5 deficit in the second set, saving two set points in the process. After defeating Spaniard Paula Badosa in the quarterfinals following Badosa's retirement in the second set, she was defeated by Swiss wildcard Jil Teichmann in straight sets in the semifinals.

She reached world No. 3 on 13 September 2021, following the US Open where she reached the quarterfinals, losing to Maria Sakkari. The following week, due to wrist injury Plíšková had to withdraw from the Ostrava Open. At Indian Wells, she was upset by lucky loser Beatriz Haddad Maia in the third round. Plíšková qualified for the WTA Finals for the fifth straight time. During the round robin stage, she defeated Garbiñe Muguruza and Barbora Krejčíková, each in three sets, but lost to Anett Kontaveit in straight sets. Although she posted a 2–1 record, she finished third in the group due to the tiebreaker rule that considers the ratio of sets won to lost, therefore failing to qualify for the semifinals.

=== 2022: Hiatus after injury, Major quarterfinal, out of top 30 ===
Plíšková was forced to withdraw from all events held during the Australian swing, after sustaining a hand injury during training. This marked the first time that Plíšková did not appear in a major main draw since the 2012 US Open, when she failed to qualify.

Plíšková lost her first two matches of the season, at Indian Wells to Danka Kovinić and at Miami to Anna Kalinskaya, before winning her first match at Charleston to Katarina Zavatska; she would lose her second-round match to Ekaterina Alexandrova. Defeating compatriot Petra Kvitová at Stuttgart, she would lose her next two matches, to Liudmila Samsonova, and to Marie Bouzková at Madrid. Pliskova then returned to Rome where she had been in the final for three consecutive years. She lost in the first round to Jil Teichmann. At the French open, she lost to French wildcard ranked 227th Léolia Jeanjean, in the second round.

In Berlin, she defeated Kaia Kanepi and Bianca Andreescu before losing to Coco Gauff in the quarterfinals. Then, she was defeated by Katie Boulter in Eastbourne second round. At Wimbledon, she lost to Boulter again in the second round.

Plíšková started the 2022 North American hardcourt swing in San Jose. She finally defeated Boulter in the first round, before falling to Amanda Anisimova in the second round. Plíšková regained her form at Toronto. She reached the semifinals cruising by Krejčíková, Anisimova, Maria Sakkari and Zheng Qinwen where she lost to Haddad Maia, in straight sets. This was followed by a second round exit to Elise Mertens in Cincinnati.

Seeded 22nd at the US Open, she reached the fourth round defeating Magda Linette, Marie Bouzková and Belinda Bencic. She reached the quarterfinals, defeating Victoria Azarenka, where she hit 53 winners and 36 errors compared to Azarenka's 46 winners and 39 errors, before losing to Aryna Sabalenka.

In Tokyo, she lost in the second round to Petra Martić, in straight sets.

She finished the year ranked at world No. 32 her lowest year-end ranking since 2013.

=== 2023: Fourth Australian Open quarterfinal ===
At the Australian Open, Plíšková reached her fourth quarterfinal defeating Zhang Shuai.

At the French Open seeded 16th she was defeated by Sloane Stephens in the first round.

At Wimbledon, she also fell in the first round to qualifier and major debutante Natalija Stevanović.

She finished the year ranked at world No. 37, her lowest year-end ranking in 10 years.

=== 2024-2025: First title in four years, hiatus ===
Plíšková's first tournament of the season was the Brisbane International, where she defeated Naomi Osaka in the second round in a three-set match, but lost to Jeļena Ostapenko in the third round in another three-set match. She then participated in the Adelaide International, in which she was defeated by Kateřina Siniaková in the first round in straight sets. At the Australian Open she was defeated by third seed Elena Rybakina in the first round in straight sets.

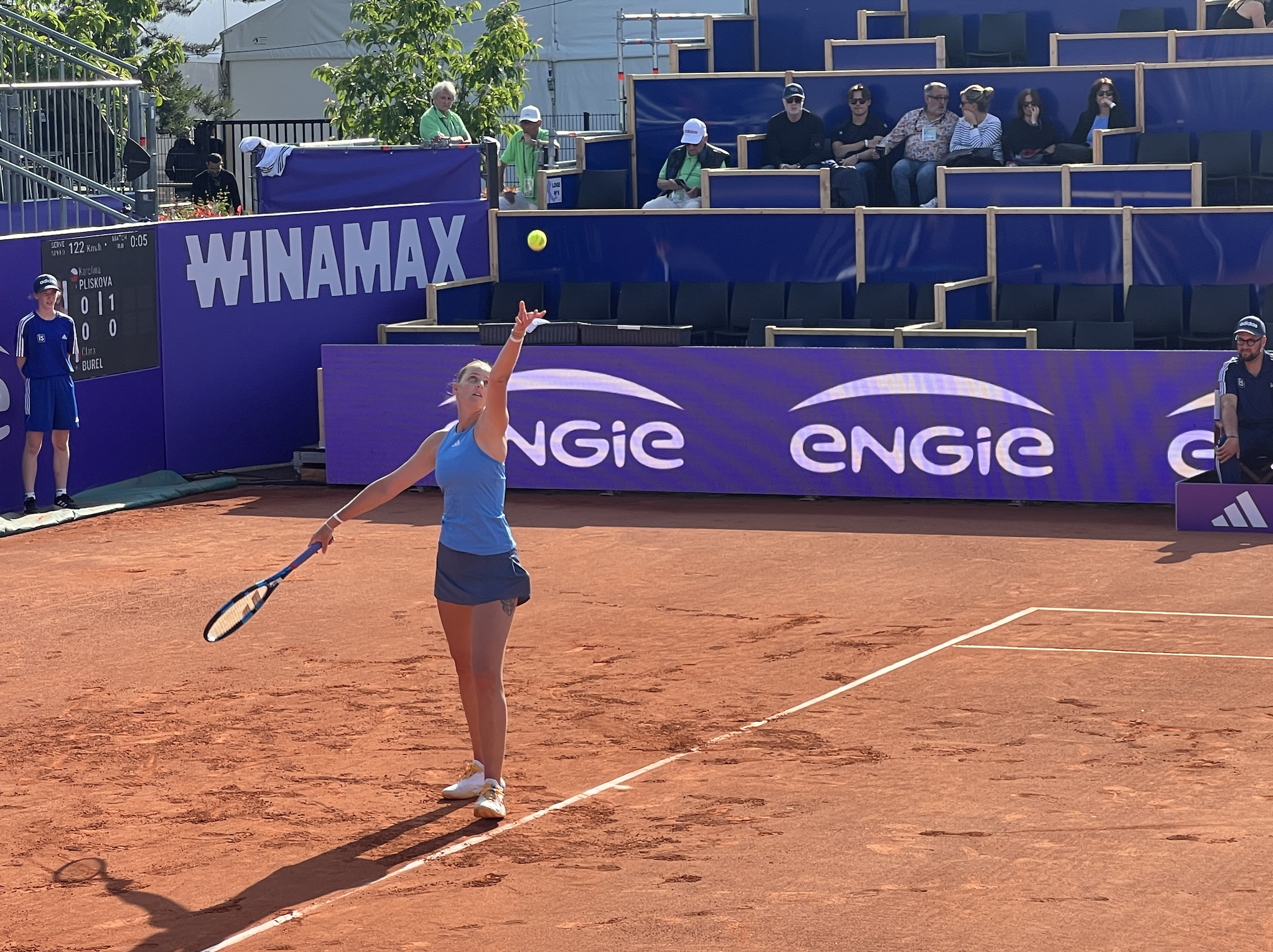
Plíšková on serve in Strasbourg in 2024.

In February, still on hard courts but in Europe, Plíškova participated in the Transylvania Open where she won the title, her first in four years, over local player Ana Bogdan without the loss of a single set during the tournament. The following week at the Qatar Ladies Open, she reached her first quarterfinal at a WTA 1000 level since the 2022 Canadian Open, with a win over compatriot Linda Nosková. As a result, as she returned to the top 50 in the rankings. Next she defeated again Naomi Osaka to reach the semifinals, this time in straight sets. As a result, prior to the start of the Dubai Championships, she returned to the top 40 at No. 36 on 19 February 2024.

Following a great beginning of the season, she received a wildcard for the Indian Wells Open, but was defeated in the first round by Anna Blinkova.

Unseeded at the US Open, she recorded her first major win of the season against Mayar Sherif, before retiring due to an injury to her left foot after playing just three points of her second round encounter with fifth seed Jasmine Paolini. The injury ended up keeping her off the tour for the remainder of the year, as well as for the entirety of the 2025 season.

=== 2026: WTA 1000 quarterfinal, back to top 75 ===
Plíšková came back to the tour at the Australian Open. Her first round match against Sloane Stephens, which she won, marked the first major main draw match since the establishment of the current WTA Tour format in 1990 to be contested by two players ranked outside the top 1,000. She then defeated Janice Tjen before losing to ninth seed and defending champion Madison Keys in the third round.

In February at the Qatar Open, she defeated lucky loser Solana Sierra and then advanced when third seed Amanda Anisimova retired in the deciding set of their second round match due to illness. Plíšková herself was then forced to retire because of a knee injury while trailing in the first set of her third round contest against 14th seed Karolína Muchová.

At the Linz Open in April, Plíšková defeated qualifier Aliaksandra Sasnovich and second seed and defending champion Ekaterina Alexandrova to reach her first WTA Tour quarterfinal in two years. She lost to qualifier Donna Vekić in the last eight. Later that month at the Madrid Open, she recorded wins over qualifier Sinja Kraus, Maria Sakkari, 19th seed Elise Mertens and Solana Sierra to make it into her first WTA 1000 quarterfinal since the 2024 Qatar Open, at which point her run was ended by lucky loser Anastasia Potapova in three sets. Continuing her good form, Plíšková reached the fourth round at the next WTA 1000 event, the Italian Open, where she lost to second seed Elena Rybakina.

== Playing style ==
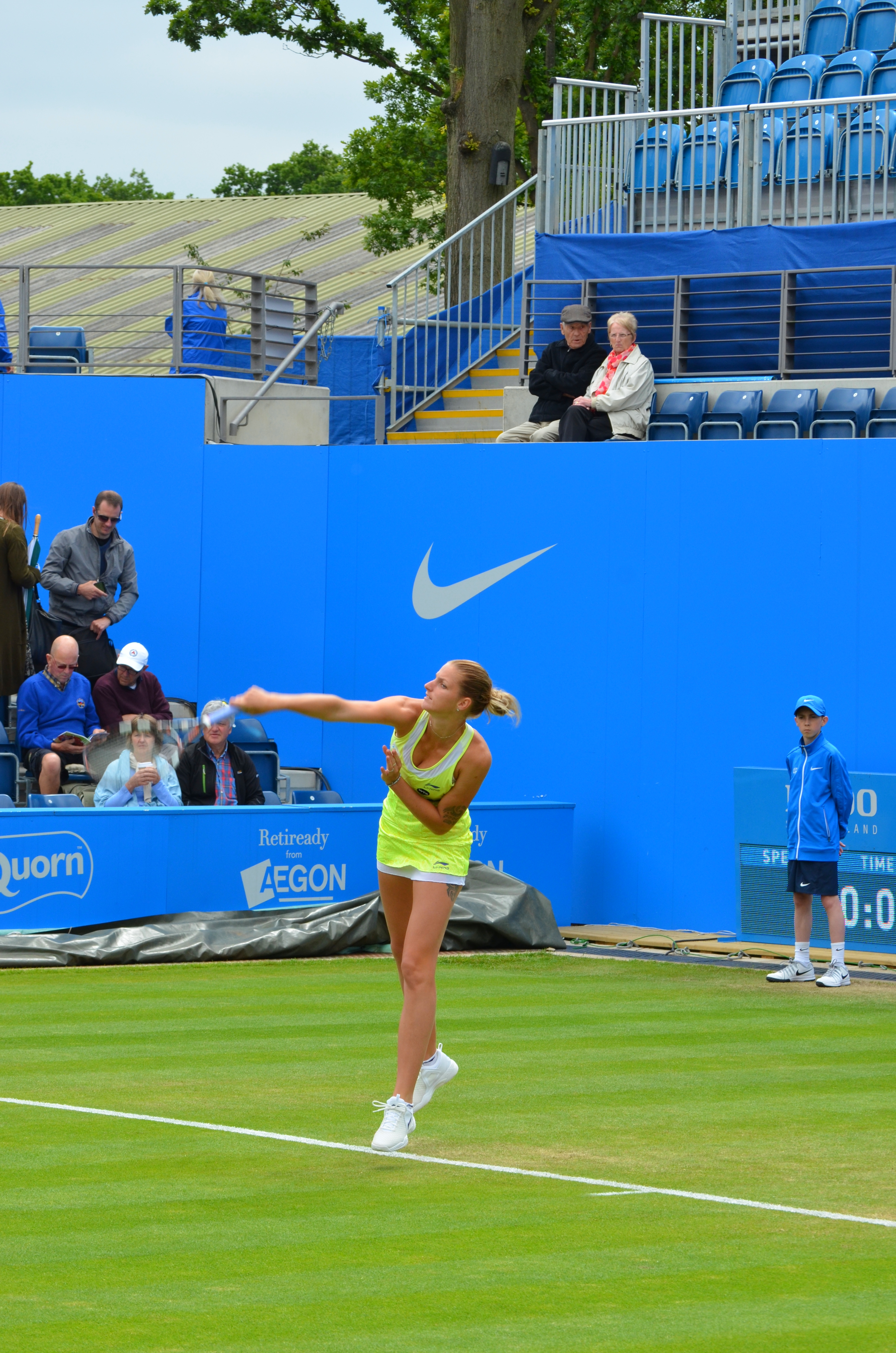
Plíšková serving

Plíšková utilizes an extremely aggressive style, highlighted by her powerful, accurate serve, forceful groundstrokes, and aggressive net play, to extract errors from opponents or win points outright. Her greatest strength is her serve, which is known for its pace, power, and precision. She typically generates high first-serve percentages, and is able to serve numerous aces. Her first serve speed averages 109 mph (175 km/h), and peaks at 119 mph (192 km/h); the fast speed of her first serve combined with its accurate placement and disguise make her first serve effective. Between 2013 and 2019, Plíšková ranked within the top 10 of the WTA ace count, and served the most aces of any player in 2015, 2016, 2017, and 2019; in 2016, she served 530 aces, the most of any player in a single year in WTA history. She double faults infrequently, although she tends to take risks on her second serve when nervous, causing double faults to accumulate. Her groundstrokes are powerful, allowing her to hit winners from any position on the court. Her strongest groundstroke is her forehand, which she hits flat, with significant pace and power; this shot is responsible for most of the winners she hits on the court. She can generate extreme angles with both her forehand and her backhand, allowing her to hit winners at will. She also shows accuracy and power on mid-court shots, sometimes following them up to the net, where she can hit the most challenging volleys with ease due to her doubles experience. Although she mainly plays from the baseline until she creates the opportunity to approach the net and hit low-risk volley winners, Plíšková will occasionally utilise the serve-and-volley tactic to surprise her opponents. This tactic is highly effective – in the 2016 US Open final, she won 80% of her serve-and-volley points. Despite her considerable strengths, Plíšková's game is hampered by her poor movement, and lacklustre footwork. Although her movement has improved significantly since turning professional, it is still the weakest area of her game, allowing opponents to hit low-risk winners, due to the fact that she cannot reach the winning shot fast enough. Due to her poor movement, she struggles against defensive players who counterpunch, and aim to move her around the baseline – she possesses losing head-to-head records against many elite defensive players, including Simona Halep, Agnieszka Radwańska, Angelique Kerber, Caroline Wozniacki, Elina Svitolina, Ashleigh Barty, and Sloane Stephens. Plíšková's game is remarkably malleable, and is suited to all surfaces; she has won titles on hard, clay, and grass courts, although her quick and aggressive style of play is especially suited to hard courts.

== Coaches ==
Plíšková has had several coaches throughout her career; Jiří Vaněk (2014–16), David Kotyza (2017), and Tomáš Krupa (2017–18). After parting with Krupa, she united with Rennae Stubbs for the 2018 US Open, although the partnership ended at the end of the year, so that Stubbs could return to her career as a TV tennis commentator. She was coached by Conchita Martínez throughout the 2019 season; their partnership ended that year when Martínez began to coach Garbiñe Muguruza. In 2019, Plíšková announced that she would be coached by ATP coach Daniel Vallverdú for the 2020 season. Due to a string of poor results, their partnership ended at the end of 2020.

She then announced that she would be coached by former WTA doubles player Olga Savchuk. This partnership has produced success at the highest level and is continued through the US Open 2022. Also from November 2020 to July 2022, she was coached by Sascha Bajin. She reached the 2021 Wimbledon Championships final under his tutelage. The two reunited in December 2022 for the 2023 season. They split for a second time in July 2023.

== Career statistics ==
=== Grand Slam tournament performance timeline ===
Key
W	F	SF	QF	#R	RR	Q#	DNQ	A	NH

(W) winner; (F) finalist; (SF) semifinalist; (QF) quarterfinalist; (#R) rounds 4, 3, 2, 1; (RR) round-robin stage; (Q#) qualification round; (DNQ) did not qualify; (A) absent; (NH) not held; (SR) strike rate (events won / competed); (W–L) win–loss record.
To avoid confusion and double counting, these charts are updated at the conclusion of a tournament or when the player's participation has ended.

Current through 2026 US Open.

Tournament	2010	2011	2012	2013	2014	2015	2016	2017	2018	2019	2020	2021	2022	2023	2024	2025	2026	SR	W–L	Win %
Australian Open	A	Q1	Q1	1R	2R	3R	3R	QF	QF	SF	3R	3R	A	QF	1R	A	3R	0 / 12	28–12	70%
French Open	A	Q2	1R	1R	2R	2R	1R	SF	3R	3R	2R	2R	2R	1R	1R	A	Q2	0 / 13	14–13	54%
Wimbledon	Q1	A	1R	2R	2R	2R	2R	2R	4R	4R	NH	F	2R	1R	1R	A	2R	0 / 13	19–13	62%
US Open	Q1	Q1	Q2	1R	3R	1R	F	QF	QF	4R	2R	QF	QF	2R	2R	A	2R	0 / 12	31–13	70%
Win–loss	0–0	0–0	0–2	1–4	5–4	4–4	9–4	14–4	13–4	13–4	4–3	13–4	6–3	5–4	1–4	0–0	4–3	0 / 50	92–51	64%

=== Grand Slam tournament finals ===
==== Singles: 2 (2 runner-ups) ====
Result	Year	Championship	Surface	Opponent	Score
Loss	2016	US Open	Hard	(Germany) Angelique Kerber	3–6, 6–4, 4–6
Loss	2021	Wimbledon	Grass	(Australia) Ashleigh Barty	3–6, 7–6^{(7–4)}, 3–6

== Notes ==
Sporting positions
Preceded by Angelique Kerber	World No. 1; 17 July 2017 – 10 September 2017	Succeeded by Garbiñe Muguruza
Preceded by (United States) Serena Williams	US Open Series Champion; 2015	Succeeded by (Poland) Agnieszka Radwańska
