= 2017 Aegon International Eastbourne – Women's singles =

Women's singles
- 2017 Aegon International Eastbourne

Final
- Champion: (Czech Republic) Karolína Plíšková
- Runner-up: (Denmark) Caroline Wozniacki
- Score: 6–4, 6–4

Events
Singles	men	women
Doubles	men	women
← 2016 ·	Aegon International Eastbourne	· 2018 →

Dominika Cibulková was the defending champion, but lost in the second round to Heather Watson.

Karolína Plíšková won the title, defeating Caroline Wozniacki in the final, 6–4, 6–4.

Angelique Kerber retained the WTA no. 1 singles ranking after Simona Halep lost in the quarterfinals.

== Seeds ==
All seeds received a bye into the second round.

1. (Germany) Angelique Kerber (quarterfinals)
2. (Romania) Simona Halep (quarterfinals)
3. (Czech Republic) Karolína Plíšková (champion)
4. (Slovakia) Dominika Cibulková (second round)
5. (United Kingdom) Johanna Konta (semifinals, withdrew due to spine injury)
6. (Denmark) Caroline Wozniacki (final)
7. (Russia) Svetlana Kuznetsova (quarterfinals)
8. (Poland) Agnieszka Radwańska (second round)

9. (France) Kristina Mladenovic (third round)
10. (Latvia) Jeļena Ostapenko (third round)
11. (Spain) Garbiñe Muguruza (second round)
12. (Russia) Elena Vesnina (third round)
13. (Czech Republic) Petra Kvitová (withdrew due to abdominal strain)
14. (Russia) Anastasia Pavlyuchenkova (third round)
15. (Switzerland) Timea Bacsinszky (second round)
16. (Australia) Daria Gavrilova (second round)

Click on the seed number of a player to go to their draw section.

== Draw ==
=== Key ===
- Q = Qualifier
- WC = Wild card
- LL = Lucky loser
- Alt = Alternate
- ITF = ITF entry
- PR = Protected ranking
- SR = Special ranking
- SE = Special exempt
- JE = Junior exempt
- JR = Junior Accelerator Programme entrant
- CO = College Accelerator Programme entrant
- NG = Next Gen Accelerator Program entrant
- w/o = Walkover
- r = Retired
- d = Defaulted

=== Finals ===
Quarterfinals
1/WC	(Germany) Angelique Kerber	3	4
5	(United Kingdom) Johanna Konta	6	6
3	(Czech Republic) Karolína Plíšková	6^{7}	6	6
7	(Russia) Svetlana Kuznetsova	7^{9}	2	4
(Czech Republic) Barbora Strýcová	1	6	4
WC	(United Kingdom) Heather Watson	6	1	6
6	(Denmark) Caroline Wozniacki	5	6	6
2/WC	(Romania) Simona Halep	7	4	1

Semifinals
5	(United Kingdom) Johanna Konta
3	(Czech Republic) Karolína Plíšková	w/o
WC	(United Kingdom) Heather Watson	2	6	5
6	(Denmark) Caroline Wozniacki	6	3	7

Final
3	(Czech Republic) Karolína Plíšková	6	6
6	(Denmark) Caroline Wozniacki	4	4

=== Top half ===
==== Section 1 ====
First round
WC	(United Kingdom) N Broady	2	7^{9}	1
(Czech Republic) Kr Plíšková	6	6^{7}	6
(Kazakhstan) Y Putintseva	4	7^{7}	1^{r}
Q	(Spain) L Arruabarrena	6	6^{2}	2
(Spain) C Suárez Navarro	6	6
(Russia) E Makarova	3	1
LL	(Romania) S Cîrstea	6	6
(Czech Republic) K Siniaková	3	2

Second round
1/WC	(Germany) A Kerber	4	6	7
(Czech Republic) Kr Plíšková	6	1	5
Q	(Spain) L Arruabarrena	2	6	6
16	(Australia) D Gavrilova	6	2	3
10	(Latvia) J Ostapenko	6	0	6
(Spain) C Suárez Navarro	3	6	4
LL	(Romania) S Cîrstea	2	2
5	(United Kingdom) J Konta	6	6

Third round
1/WC	(Germany) A Kerber	6	6
Q	(Spain) L Arruabarrena	2	1
10	(Latvia) J Ostapenko	5	6	4
5	(United Kingdom) J Konta	7	3	6

Quarterfinals
1/WC	(Germany) A Kerber	3	4
5	(United Kingdom) J Konta	6	6

==== Section 2 ====
First round
(United States) A Riske	6	7
(France) A Cornet	4	5
Q	(Italy) F Schiavone	3	4
(China) S Peng	6	6
(China) S Zhang	6	6
Q	(United States) V Lepchenko	2	1
(Croatia) A Konjuh	4	0^{r}
Q	(Germany) M Barthel	6	1

Second round
3	(Czech Republic) Ka Plíšková	6	6
(United States) A Riske	4	3
(China) S Peng	7^{9}	2	6
15	(Switzerland) T Bacsinszky	6^{7}	6	4
9	(France) K Mladenovic	6	6
(China) S Zhang	0	4
Q	(Germany) M Barthel	6	5	2
7	(Russia) S Kuznetsova	4	7	6

Third round
3	(Czech Republic) Ka Plíšková	7^{7}	6
(China) S Peng	6^{3}	4
9	(France) K Mladenovic	4	6	3
7	(Russia) S Kuznetsova	6	2	6

Quarterfinals
3	(Czech Republic) Ka Plíšková	6^{7}	6	6
7	(Russia) S Kuznetsova	7^{9}	2	4

=== Bottom half ===
==== Section 3 ====
First round
LL	(Slovakia) K Kučová	4	2
LL	(United States) L Davis	6	6
(Canada) E Bouchard	3	6	2
(Czech Republic) B Strýcová	6	3	6
(Hungary) T Babos	1	1
(Belgium) E Mertens	6	6
(Ukraine) L Tsurenko	3	6	4
WC	(United Kingdom) H Watson	6	4	6

Second round
8	(Poland) A Radwańska	6^{1}	1
LL	(United States) L Davis	7^{7}	6
(Czech Republic) B Strýcová	6	6
11	(Spain) G Muguruza	1	0
14	(Russia) A Pavlyuchenkova	3	6	6
(Belgium) E Mertens	6	4	1
WC	(United Kingdom) H Watson	7	6
4	(Slovakia) D Cibulková	5	4

Third round
LL	(United States) L Davis	5	2
(Czech Republic) B Strýcová	7	6
14	(Russia) A Pavlyuchenkova	4	3
WC	(United Kingdom) H Watson	6	6

Quarterfinals
(Czech Republic) B Strýcová	1	6	4
WC	(United Kingdom) H Watson	6	1	6

==== Section 4 ====
First round
(Japan) N Osaka	6	6
LL	(Japan) R Ozaki	0	1
Q	(Chinese Taipei) S-w Hsieh	6	3	3
LL	(Paraguay) V Cepede Royg	4	6	6
(Croatia) M Lučić-Baroni	4	7	5
(Romania) M Niculescu	6	5	7
(United States) C McHale	3	0^{r}
Q	(China) Y Duan	6	4

Second round
6	(Denmark) C Wozniacki	6	7^{7}
(Japan) N Osaka	2	6^{5}
LL	(Paraguay) V Cepede Royg	3	3
12	(Russia) E Vesnina	6	6
LL	(Bulgaria) T Pironkova	6	6
(Romania) M Niculescu	0	4
Q	(China) Y Duan	6	3	2
2/WC	(Romania) S Halep	3	6	6

Third round
6	(Denmark) C Wozniacki	6	6
12	(Russia) E Vesnina	1	2
LL	(Bulgaria) T Pironkova	7^{8}	6^{4}	5
2/WC	(Romania) S Halep	6^{6}	7^{7}	7

Quarterfinals
6	(Denmark) C Wozniacki	5	6	6
2/WC	(Romania) S Halep	7	4	1

== Qualifying ==
=== Seeds ===
1. (United States) Lauren Davis (qualifying competition, lucky loser)
2. (Germany) Mona Barthel (qualified)
3. (Spain) Lara Arruabarrena (qualified)
4. (Romania) Sorana Cîrstea (qualifying competition, lucky loser)
5. (China) Duan Yingying (qualified)
6. (United States) Varvara Lepchenko (qualified)
7. (Italy) Sara Errani (first round)
8. (Italy) Francesca Schiavone (qualified)
9. (Japan) Risa Ozaki (qualifying competition, lucky loser)
10. (Czech Republic) Markéta Vondroušová (first round)
11. (Luxembourg) Mandy Minella (first round, retired)
12. (Belgium) Kirsten Flipkens (first round)

=== Qualifiers ===
1. (Italy) Francesca Schiavone
2. (Germany) Mona Barthel
3. (Spain) Lara Arruabarrena
4. (Chinese Taipei) Hsieh Su-wei
5. (China) Duan Yingying
6. (United States) Varvara Lepchenko

=== Lucky losers ===
1. (Romania) Sorana Cîrstea
2. (Japan) Risa Ozaki
3. (Paraguay) Verónica Cepede Royg
4. (Slovakia) Kristína Kučová
5. (United States) Lauren Davis
6. (Bulgaria) Tsvetana Pironkova

=== Draw ===
==== First qualifier ====
First round
1	(United States) Lauren Davis	6	6
WC	(United Kingdom) Gabriella Taylor	0	2
WC	(United Kingdom) Harriet Dart	2	2
8	(Italy) Francesca Schiavone	6	6

Qualifying competition
1	(United States) Lauren Davis	3	6	1
8	(Italy) Francesca Schiavone	6	0	6

==== Second qualifier ====
First round
2	(Germany) Mona Barthel	3	7^{8}	7
(Brazil) Beatriz Haddad Maia	6	6^{6}	5
(Slovakia) Kristína Kučová	7^{7}	6^{5}	2
11	(Luxembourg) Mandy Minella	6^{3}	7^{7}	0^{r}

Qualifying competition
2	(Germany) Mona Barthel	6	7
(Slovakia) Kristína Kučová	2	5

==== Third qualifier ====
First round
3	(Spain) Lara Arruabarrena	5	6	7^{7}
(Netherlands) Richèl Hogenkamp	7	1	6^{2}
(Bulgaria) Tsvetana Pironkova	6	6
10	(Czech Republic) Markéta Vondroušová	2	2

Qualifying competition
3	(Spain) Lara Arruabarrena	3	6	6
(Bulgaria) Tsvetana Pironkova	6	2	2

==== Fourth qualifier ====
First round
4	(Romania) Sorana Cîrstea	6	6
(China) Liu Fangzhou	1	2
(Chinese Taipei) Hsieh Su-wei	5	7^{8}	7
12	(Belgium) Kirsten Flipkens	7	6^{6}	5

Qualifying competition
4	(Romania) Sorana Cîrstea	6^{3}	1
(Chinese Taipei) Hsieh Su-wei	7^{7}	6

==== Fifth qualifier ====
First round
5	(China) Duan Yingying	6^{4}	6	7^{7}
WC	(United Kingdom) Katy Dunne	7^{7}	4	6^{3}
(Paraguay) Verónica Cepede Royg	6	6
7	(Italy) Sara Errani	1	2

Qualifying competition
5	(China) Duan Yingying	7^{7}	6
(Paraguay) Verónica Cepede Royg	6^{5}	2

==== Sixth qualifier ====
First round
6	(United States) Varvara Lepchenko	6	7^{7}
WC	(United Kingdom) Katie Swan	1	6^{3}
Alt	(United States) Jacqueline Cako	5	0
9	(Japan) Risa Ozaki	7	6

Qualifying competition
6	(United States) Varvara Lepchenko	6	6
9	(Japan) Risa Ozaki	4	4
