= 2019 Kremlin Cup – Men's singles =

Men's singles
- 2019 Kremlin Cup

Final
- Champion: (Russia) Andrey Rublev
- Runner-up: (France) Adrian Mannarino
- Score: 6–4, 6–0

Details
- Draw: 28 (4 Q / 3 WC )
- Seeds: 8

Events
| Singles | men | women |
| Doubles | men | women |
| ← 2018 · | Kremlin Cup | · 2021 → |

Karen Khachanov was the defending champion, but lost in the quarterfinals to Andreas Seppi.

Andrey Rublev won the title, defeating Adrian Mannarino in the final, 6–4, 6–0.

== Seeds ==
The top four seeds received a bye into the second round.

1. (Russia) Daniil Medvedev (withdrew)
2. (Russia) Karen Khachanov (quarterfinals)
3. (Croatia) Marin Čilić (semifinals)
4. (Serbia) Dušan Lajović (quarterfinals)
5. (Chile) Cristian Garín (first round)
6. (Russia) Andrey Rublev (champion)
7. (France) Adrian Mannarino (final)
8. (Serbia) Miomir Kecmanović (second round)

== Draw ==
Key

- Q = Qualifier
- WC = Wild card
- LL = Lucky loser
- Alt = Alternate
- ITF = ITF entry
- PR = Protected ranking
- SR = Special ranking
- SE = Special exempt
- JE = Junior exempt
- JR = Junior Accelerator Programme entrant
- CO = College Accelerator Programme entrant
- NG = Next Gen Accelerator Program entrant
- w/o = Walkover
- r = Retired
- d = Defaulted

=== Finals ===
Semifinals
6 | (Russia) Andrey Rublev | 7 | 6
3 | (Croatia) Marin Čilić | 5 | 4
7 | (France) Adrian Mannarino | 6 | 6
(Italy) Andreas Seppi | 3 | 4

Final
6 | (Russia) Andrey Rublev | 6 | 6
7 | (France) Adrian Mannarino | 4 | 0

=== Top half ===
First round
WC | (Russia) A Kachmazov | 1 | 6 | 1
WC | (Russia) A Avidzba | 6 | 4 | 6
Q | (Belarus) E Gerasimov | 6 | 6
(Italy) T Fabbiano | 3 | 4
(Kazakhstan) A Bublik | 1 | 6 | 4
6 | (Russia) A Rublev | 6 | 3 | 6
(Croatia) I Karlović | 6 | 6^{5} | 7^{8}
(Slovenia) A Bedene | 4 | 7^{7} | 6^{6}
(France) J Chardy | 6 | 6
(Chile) N Jarry | 4 | 2
Q | (Russia) A Dubrivnyy | 1 | 5
8 | (Serbia) M Kecmanović | 6 | 7

Second round
LL | (Serbia) N Milojević | 7 | 6
WC | (Russia) A Avidzba | 5 | 0
Q | (Belarus) E Gerasimov | 6^{3} | 7^{8} | 2
6 | (Russia) A Rublev | 7^{7} | 6^{6} | 6
3 | (Croatia) M Čilić | 6 | 7^{7}
(Croatia) I Karlović | 1 | 6^{5}
(France) J Chardy | 6 | 6
8 | (Serbia) M Kecmanović | 3 | 4

Quarterfinals
LL | (Serbia) N Milojević | 2 | 3
6 | (Russia) A Rublev | 6 | 6
3 | (Croatia) M Čilić | 6 | 4 | 7^{7}
(France) J Chardy | 4 | 6 | 6^{2}

Semifinals
6 | (Russia) A Rublev | 7 | 6
3 | (Croatia) M Čilić | 5 | 4

=== Bottom half ===
First round
7 | (France) A Mannarino | 7^{7} | 6
Q | (Bosnia and Herzegovina) D Džumhur | 6^{2} | 0
WC | (Russia) E Donskoy | 4 | 3
(Kazakhstan) M Kukushkin | 6 | 6
Q | (Czech Republic) L Rosol | 6^{4} | 7^{9} | 6
(Argentina) JI Londero | 7^{7} | 6^{7} | 3
5 | (Chile) C Garín | 6 | 6^{2} | 6^{4}
(Italy) A Seppi | 3 | 7^{7} | 7^{7}
(Spain) R Carballés Baena | 6 | 4 | 6
(Lithuania) R Berankis | 2 | 6 | 3
(Germany) P Kohlschreiber | 6 | 7^{7}
(France) P-H Herbert | 3 | 6^{3}

Second round
7 | (France) A Mannarino | 7^{7} | 6
(Kazakhstan) M Kukushkin | 6^{4} | 2
Q | (Czech Republic) L Rosol | 4 | 7^{8} | 3
4 | (Serbia) D Lajović | 6 | 6^{6} | 6
(Italy) A Seppi | 5 | 6 | 6
(Spain) R Carballés Baena | 7 | 1 | 3
(Germany) P Kohlschreiber | 6 | 3 | 6^{7}
2 | (Russia) K Khachanov | 3 | 6 | 7^{9}

Quarterfinals
7 | (France) A Mannarino | 7^{7} | 6
4 | (Serbia) D Lajović | 6^{3} | 1
(Italy) A Seppi | 3 | 6 | 6
2 | (Russia) K Khachanov | 6 | 3 | 3

Semifinals
7 | (France) A Mannarino | 6 | 6
(Italy) A Seppi | 3 | 4

== Qualifying ==
=== Seeds ===
1. (Belarus) Egor Gerasimov (qualified)
2. (Bosnia and Herzegovina) Damir Džumhur (qualified)
3. (Belarus) Ilya Ivashka (first round)
4. (Czech Republic) Lukáš Rosol (qualified)
5. (Serbia) Nikola Milojević (qualifying competition, Lucky loser)
6. (Austria) Sebastian Ofner (qualifying competition)
7. (Germany) Rudolf Molleker (qualifying competition)
8. (Slovakia) Filip Horanský (qualifying competition)

=== Qualifiers ===
1. (Belarus) Egor Gerasimov
2. (Bosnia and Herzegovina) Damir Džumhur
3. (Russia) Artem Dubrivnyy
4. (Czech Republic) Lukáš Rosol

=== Lucky loser ===
1. (Serbia) Nikola Milojević

=== Qualifying draw ===
==== First qualifier ====
First round
1 | (Belarus) Egor Gerasimov | 6 | 6
(France) Elliot Benchetrit | 0 | 3
(France) Maxime Janvier | 6 | 1 | 3
7 | (Germany) Rudolf Molleker | 4 | 6 | 6

Qualifying competition
1 | (Belarus) Egor Gerasimov | 6 | 4 | 6
7 | (Germany) Rudolf Molleker | 3 | 6 | 3

==== Second qualifier ====
First round
2 | (Bosnia and Herzegovina) Damir Džumhur | 6 | 6
(Russia) Alexey Vatutin | 4 | 3
(Bosnia and Herzegovina) Mirza Bašić | 6^{3} | 6 | 3
6 | (Austria) Sebastian Ofner | 7^{7} | 3 | 6

Qualifying competition
2 | (Bosnia and Herzegovina) Damir Džumhur | 6 | 6
6 | (Austria) Sebastian Ofner | 2 | 2

==== Third qualifier ====
First round
3 | (Belarus) Ilya Ivashka | 7 | 2 | 2
WC | (Russia) Artem Dubrivnyy | 5 | 6 | 6
WC | (Russia) Evgeny Karlovskiy | 6 | 3 | 0
8 | (Slovakia) Filip Horanský | 4 | 6 | 6

Qualifying competition
WC | (Russia) Artem Dubrivnyy | 6 | 7
8 | (Slovakia) Filip Horanský | 4 | 5

==== Fourth qualifier ====
First round
4 | (Czech Republic) Lukáš Rosol | 6 | 6
(Russia) Roman Safiullin | 3 | 4
(Italy) Roberto Marcora | 3 | 3
5 | (Serbia) Nikola Milojević | 6 | 6

Qualifying competition
4 | (Czech Republic) Lukáš Rosol | 7 | 6^{6} | 6
5 | (Serbia) Nikola Milojević | 5 | 7^{8} | 3
