= 2019 Kremlin Cup – Women's singles =

Women's singles
- 2019 Kremlin Cup

Final
- Champion: (Switzerland) Belinda Bencic
- Runner-up: (Russia) Anastasia Pavlyuchenkova
- Score: 3–6, 6–1, 6–1

Events
Singles	men	women
Doubles	men	women
- Kremlin Cup

Daria Kasatkina was the defending champion, but lost in the first round to Dayana Yastremska.

Belinda Bencic won the title, defeating Anastasia Pavlyuchenkova in the final, 3–6, 6–1, 6–1. By defeating Kristina Mladenovic in the semifinals, Bencic qualified and earned the final berth for the 2019 WTA Finals, overtaking both Kiki Bertens and Serena Williams in the WTA race.

== Seeds ==
The top four seeds received a bye into the second round.

1. (Ukraine) Elina Svitolina (second round)
2. (Netherlands) Kiki Bertens (quarterfinals)
3. (Switzerland) Belinda Bencic (champion)
4. (Croatia) Donna Vekić (second round)
5. (Ukraine) Dayana Yastremska (second round)
6. (Latvia) Anastasija Sevastova (second round)
7. (Greece) Maria Sakkari (first round)
8. (Russia) Ekaterina Alexandrova (quarterfinals)

== Draw ==
Key

- Q = Qualifier
- WC = Wild card
- LL = Lucky loser
- Alt = Alternate
- ITF = ITF entry
- PR = Protected ranking
- SR = Special ranking
- SE = Special exempt
- JE = Junior exempt
- JR = Junior Accelerator Programme entrant
- CO = College Accelerator Programme entrant
- NG = Next Gen Accelerator Program entrant
- w/o = Walkover
- r = Retired
- d = Defaulted

=== Finals ===
Semifinals
(Russia) Anastasia Pavlyuchenkova	6	6^{6}	6
(Czech Republic) Karolína Muchová	4	7^{8}	1
3/WC	(Switzerland) Belinda Bencic	6	6
(France) Kristina Mladenovic	3	4

Final
(Russia) Anastasia Pavlyuchenkova	6	1	1
3/WC	(Switzerland) Belinda Bencic	3	6	6

=== Top half ===
First round
(Tunisia) O Jabeur	3	3
(Russia) V Kudermetova	6	6
Q	(Russia) V Gracheva	6	6
(Australia) A Tomljanović	3	2
(Russia) A Pavlyuchenkova	5	6	6
7	(Greece) M Sakkari	7	1	3
(Russia) S Kuznetsova	2	3
(Czech Republic) K Muchová	6	6
(Russia) A Potapova	0	6	4
WC	(Russia) A Kalinskaya	6	3	6
Q	(Slovakia) J Čepelová	1	4
8	(Russia) E Alexandrova	6	6

Second round
1	(Ukraine) E Svitolina	2	6	5
(Russia) V Kudermetova	6	1	7
Q	(Russia) V Gracheva	7	4	2
(Russia) A Pavlyuchenkova	5	6	6
4	(Croatia) D Vekić	4	2
(Czech Republic) K Muchová	6	6
WC	(Russia) A Kalinskaya	1	1
8	(Russia) E Alexandrova	6	6

Quarterfinals
(Russia) V Kudermetova	6^{5}	5
(Russia) A Pavlyuchenkova	7^{7}	7
(Czech Republic) K Muchová	6	6
8	(Russia) E Alexandrova	3	4

Semifinals
(Russia) A Pavlyuchenkova	6	6^{6}	6
(Czech Republic) K Muchová	4	7^{8}	1

=== Bottom half ===
First round
5	(Ukraine) D Yastremska	6	6
(Russia) D Kasatkina	1	4
Q	(Belgium) K Flipkens	6	6
(Russia) N Vikhlyantseva	3	2
(Slovenia) P Hercog	6	6
(Czech Republic) K Siniaková	4	2
6	(Latvia) A Sevastova	6	7
(Belarus) A Sasnovich	1	5
(France) K Mladenovic	6	3	6
(Kazakhstan) Y Putintseva	4	6	2
(Hungary) T Babos	1	3
Q	(Estonia) K Kanepi	6	6

Second round
5	(Ukraine) D Yastremska	3	6	3
Q	(Belgium) K Flipkens	6	3	6
(Slovenia) P Hercog	6	3	4
3/WC	(Switzerland) B Bencic	1	6	6
6	(Latvia) A Sevastova	5	6	3
(France) K Mladenovic	7	3	6
Q	(Estonia) K Kanepi	6	3	5
2	(Netherlands) K Bertens	4	6	7

Quarterfinals
Q	(Belgium) K Flipkens	6^{8}	1
3/WC	(Switzerland) B Bencic	7^{10}	6
(France) K Mladenovic	6	2	6
2	(Netherlands) K Bertens	4	6	1

Semifinals
3/WC	(Switzerland) B Bencic	6	6
(France) K Mladenovic	3	4

== Qualifying ==
=== Seeds ===
1. (Estonia) Kaia Kanepi (qualified)
2. (Russia) Vitalia Diatchenko (first round)
3. (Italy) Jasmine Paolini (first round)
4. (Belgium) Kirsten Flipkens (qualified)
5. (Russia) Varvara Gracheva (qualified)
6. (Czech Republic) Tereza Martincová (qualifying competition)
7. (Romania) Ana Bogdan (first round)
8. (Russia) Varvara Flink (second round)

=== Qualifiers ===
1. (Estonia) Kaia Kanepi
2. (Slovakia) Jana Čepelová
3. (Russia) Varvara Gracheva
4. (Belgium) Kirsten Flipkens

=== Draw ===
==== First qualifier ====
First round
1	(Estonia) Kaia Kanepi	6	6
WC	(Russia) Vlada Koval	0	0
(Russia) Valentina Ivakhnenko	3	6	4
(Ukraine) Anhelina Kalinina	6	4	6
(Croatia) Jana Fett	6	6
(Croatia) Darija Jurak	4	2
(Belarus) Olga Govortsova	2	3
6	(Czech Republic) Tereza Martincová	6	6

Second round
1	(Estonia) Kaia Kanepi	4
(Ukraine) Anhelina Kalinina	1^{r}
(Croatia) Jana Fett	2	2
6	(Czech Republic) Tereza Martincová	6	6

Qualifying competition
1	(Estonia) Kaia Kanepi	6	6
6	(Czech Republic) Tereza Martincová	2	3

==== Second qualifier ====
First round
2	(Russia) Vitalia Diatchenko	1	2
(Bulgaria) Isabella Shinikova	6	6
(Serbia) Olga Danilović	3	6	6
(Russia) Sofya Lansere	6	4	0
(Ukraine) Nadiia Kichenok	4	4
WC	(Russia) Anastasia Zakharova	6	6
(Slovakia) Jana Čepelová	1	6	6
7	(Romania) Ana Bogdan	6	4	3

Second round
(Bulgaria) Isabella Shinikova	6	2	6
(Serbia) Olga Danilović	4	6	2
WC	(Russia) Anastasia Zakharova	4	3
(Slovakia) Jana Čepelová	6	6

Qualifying competition
(Bulgaria) Isabella Shinikova	5	4
(Slovakia) Jana Čepelová	7	6

==== Third qualifier ====
First round
3	(Italy) Jasmine Paolini	2	4
(Italy) Giulia Gatto-Monticone	6	6
(Bulgaria) Elitsa Kostova	3	4
(Greece) Valentini Grammatikopoulou	6	6
WC	(Russia) Polina Kudermetova	7	6
WC	(Russia) Oksana Selekhmeteva	5	2
(Turkey) Başak Eraydın	0	6	3
5	(Russia) Varvara Gracheva	6	2	6

Second round
(Italy) Giulia Gatto-Monticone	6	5	7^{7}
(Greece) Valentini Grammatikopoulou	3	7	6^{4}
WC	(Russia) Polina Kudermetova	4	2
5	(Russia) Varvara Gracheva	6	6

Qualifying competition
(Italy) Giulia Gatto-Monticone	1	3
5	(Russia) Varvara Gracheva	6	6

==== Fourth qualifier ====
First round
4	(Belgium) Kirsten Flipkens	6	6
(Russia) Anastasia Gasanova	1	2
(Russia) Kamilla Rakhimova	4	6	2
(Russia) Liudmila Samsonova	6	3	6
(Canada) Gabriela Dabrowski	7	6
(Romania) Jaqueline Cristian	5	0
(United States) Bethanie Mattek-Sands	2	3
8	(Russia) Varvara Flink	6	6

Second round
4	(Belgium) Kirsten Flipkens	7	6
(Russia) Liudmila Samsonova	5	4
(Canada) Gabriela Dabrowski	6	6
8	(Russia) Varvara Flink	3	4

Qualifying competition
4	(Belgium) Kirsten Flipkens	6	6
(Canada) Gabriela Dabrowski	1	4
