= 2019 Kremlin Cup – Men's doubles =

Men's doubles tennis tournament

Men's doubles
- 2019 Kremlin Cup

Final
- Champions: (Brazil) Marcelo Demoliner (Netherlands) Matwé Middelkoop
- Runners-up: (Italy) Simone Bolelli (Argentina) Andrés Molteni
- Score: 6–1, 6–2

Details
- Draw: 16
- Seeds: 4

Events
Singles	men	women
Doubles	men	women
← 2018 ·	Kremlin Cup	· 2021 →

Austin Krajicek and Rajeev Ram were the defending champions, but chose to compete in Stockholm and Antwerp, respectively, instead.

Marcelo Demoliner and Matwé Middelkoop won the title, defeating Simone Bolelli and Andrés Molteni in the final, 6–1, 6–2.

== Seeds ==
1. (Croatia) Nikola Mektić / (Croatia) Franko Škugor (first round)
2. (United Kingdom) Jamie Murray / (United Kingdom) Neal Skupski (first round)
3. (New Zealand) Marcus Daniell / (Austria) Philipp Oswald (semifinals)
4. (Brazil) Marcelo Demoliner / (Netherlands) Matwé Middelkoop (champions)

== Draw ==
=== Key ===
- Q = Qualifier
- WC = Wild card
- LL = Lucky loser
- Alt = Alternate
- SE = Special exempt
- PR = Protected ranking
- ITF = ITF entry
- JE = Junior exempt
- w/o = Walkover
- r = Retired
- d = Defaulted
- SR = Special ranking

=== Draw ===
First round
1	(Croatia) N Mektić (Croatia) F Škugor	2	6	[8]
(Italy) T Fabbiano (Italy) A Seppi	6	2	[10]
(Slovenia) A Bedene (Chile) N Jarry	2	7^{7}	[10]
WC	(Russia) E Donskoy (Russia) A Rublev	6	6^{5}	[5]
4	(Brazil) M Demoliner (Netherlands) M Middelkoop	6	6
(Chile) C Garín (Australia) J-P Smith	4	4
(Monaco) R Arneodo (Monaco) H Nys	6	6
(Lithuania) R Berankis (Argentina) JI Londero	3	2
PR	(Serbia) M Kecmanović (Serbia) N Zimonjić	2	2
(Kazakhstan) A Bublik (Kazakhstan) M Kukushkin	6	6
(Serbia) N Čačić (Serbia) D Lajović	6	4	[6]
3	(New Zealand) M Daniell (Austria) P Oswald	3	6	[10]
WC	(Russia) S Danilov (Russia) R Safiullin	5	1
(Italy) S Bolelli (Argentina) A Molteni	7	6
(Czech Republic) R Jebavý (Slovakia) I Zelenay	6	3	[10]
2	(United Kingdom) J Murray (United Kingdom) N Skupski	4	6	[4]

Quarterfinals
(Italy) T Fabbiano (Italy) A Seppi	6	6
(Slovenia) A Bedene (Chile) N Jarry	4	3
4	(Brazil) M Demoliner (Netherlands) M Middelkoop	6	7^{7}
(Monaco) R Arneodo (Monaco) H Nys	3	6^{1}
(Kazakhstan) A Bublik (Kazakhstan) M Kukushkin	5	0
3	(New Zealand) M Daniell (Austria) P Oswald	7	6
(Italy) S Bolelli (Argentina) A Molteni	6^{4}	7^{7}	[10]
(Czech Republic) R Jebavý (Slovakia) I Zelenay	7^{7}	6^{5}	[4]

Semifinals
(Italy) T Fabbiano (Italy) A Seppi	3	5
4	(Brazil) M Demoliner (Netherlands) M Middelkoop	6	7
3	(New Zealand) M Daniell (Austria) P Oswald	4	4
(Italy) S Bolelli (Argentina) A Molteni	6	6

Final
4	(Brazil) M Demoliner (Netherlands) M Middelkoop	6	6
(Italy) S Bolelli (Argentina) A Molteni	1	2
