= 2019 J&T Banka Prague Open – Singles =

Singles
- 2019 J&T Banka Prague Open

Final
- Champion: (Switzerland) Jil Teichmann
- Runner-up: (Czech Republic) Karolína Muchová
- Score: 7–6^{(7–5)}, 3–6, 6–4

Details
- Draw: 32
- Seeds: 8

Events
Singles	Doubles
- J&T Banka Prague Open

Petra Kvitová was the defending champion, but chose not to participate this year.

Jil Teichmann won her first career WTA title, defeating Karolína Muchová in the final 7–6^{(7–5)}, 3–6, 6–4.

== Seeds ==
1. (Czech Republic) Karolína Plíšková (withdrew)
2. (Latvia) Anastasija Sevastova (first round)
3. (China) Wang Qiang (quarterfinals)
4. (Romania) Mihaela Buzărnescu (first round)
5. (United States) Danielle Collins (first round)
6. (Czech Republic) Kateřina Siniaková (quarterfinals)
7. (Slovakia) Viktória Kužmová (first round)
8. (Czech Republic) Markéta Vondroušová (withdrew)
9. (Czech Republic) Barbora Strýcová (semifinals)

== Draw ==
Key

- Q = Qualifier
- WC = Wild card
- LL = Lucky loser
- Alt = Alternate
- ITF = ITF entry
- PR = Protected ranking
- SR = Special ranking
- SE = Special exempt
- JE = Junior exempt
- JR = Junior Accelerator Programme entrant
- CO = College Accelerator Programme entrant
- NG = Next Gen Accelerator Program entrant
- w/o = Walkover
- r = Retired
- d = Defaulted

=== Finals ===
Semifinals
9	(Czech Republic) Barbora Strýcová	3	0
Q	(Switzerland) Jil Teichmann	6	6
(United States) Bernarda Pera	2	5
WC	(Czech Republic) Karolína Muchová	6	7

Final
Q	(Switzerland) Jil Teichmann	7^{7}	3	6
WC	(Czech Republic) Karolína Muchová	6^{5}	6	4

=== Top half ===
First round
9	(Czech Republic) B Strýcová	6	6
(Germany) M Barthel	4	2
(United States) J Pegula	6	6^{7}	6
(Germany) A Petkovic	4	7^{9}	3
(Switzerland) S Vögele	1	2
WC	(Slovakia) J Čepelová	6	6
(Slovenia) D Jakupović	0	2
6	(Czech Republic) K Siniaková	6	6
4	(Romania) M Buzărnescu	4	2
WC	(Russia) S Kuznetsova	6	6
Q	(Switzerland) J Teichmann	6	6
(Russia) E Alexandrova	3	4
LL	(Germany) T Korpatsch	6	6
(Serbia) A Krunić	3	2
(Slovakia) AK Schmiedlová	6	6
7	(Slovakia) V Kužmová	3	3

Second round
9	(Czech Republic) B Strýcová	7	6
(United States) J Pegula	5	2
WC	(Slovakia) J Čepelová	1	3
6	(Czech Republic) K Siniaková	6	6
WC	(Russia) S Kuznetsova	6	3	2
Q	(Switzerland) J Teichmann	2	6	6
LL	(Germany) T Korpatsch	4	6	6
(Slovakia) AK Schmiedlová	6	3	0

Quarterfinals
9	(Czech Republic) B Strýcová	6	6
6	(Czech Republic) K Siniaková	1	2
Q	(Switzerland) J Teichmann	6	6
LL	(Germany) T Korpatsch	2	1

Semifinals
9	(Czech Republic) B Strýcová	3	0
Q	(Switzerland) J Teichmann	6	6

=== Bottom half ===
First round
LL	(Czech Republic) M Bouzková	1	4
Q	(Germany) A Lottner	6	6
(United States) B Pera	6	6
Q	(Austria) B Haas	4	2
(Luxembourg) M Minella	6	6
LL	(Italy) J Paolini	3	1
(Russia) M Gasparyan	3	6	2
3	(China) Q Wang	6	3	6
5	(United States) D Collins	7	3	0
(United States) J Brady	5	6	6
WC	(Czech Republic) K Muchová	4	6	6
Q	(Poland) I Świątek	6	1	4
(Czech Republic) Kr Plíšková	3	4
(Russia) N Vikhlyantseva	6	6
(Russia) A Potapova	2	6	6
2	(Latvia) A Sevastova	6	3	2

Second round
Q	(Germany) A Lottner	2	4
(United States) B Pera	6	6
(Luxembourg) M Minella	1	6	4
3	(China) Q Wang	6	4	6
(United States) J Brady	4	6	6^{2}
WC	(Czech Republic) K Muchová	6	3	7^{7}
(Russia) N Vikhlyantseva	6	2	7
(Russia) A Potapova	4	6	5

Quarterfinals
(United States) B Pera	6	6^{5}	6
3	(China) Q Wang	0	7^{7}	3
WC	(Czech Republic) K Muchová	6	6
(Russia) N Vikhlyantseva	3	4

Semifinals
(United States) B Pera	2	5
WC	(Czech Republic) K Muchová	6	7

== Qualifying ==
=== Seeds ===
1. (Poland) Iga Świątek (qualified)
2. (Czech Republic) Marie Bouzková (qualifying competition, lucky loser)
3. (Czech Republic) Tereza Smitková (second round)
4. (Brazil) Beatriz Haddad Maia (second round)
5. (United States) Christina McHale (first round)
6. (Australia) Priscilla Hon (first round)
7. (Spain) Aliona Bolsova (second round)
8. (Russia) Varvara Flink (second round)

=== Qualifiers ===
1. (Poland) Iga Świątek
2. (Austria) Barbara Haas
3. (Germany) Antonia Lottner
4. (Switzerland) Jil Teichmann

=== Lucky losers ===
1. (Germany) Tamara Korpatsch
2. (Czech Republic) Marie Bouzková
3. (Italy) Jasmine Paolini

=== Draw ===
==== First qualifier ====
First round
1	(Poland) Iga Świątek	6	6
(Italy) Anastasia Grymalska	2	0
WC	(Slovakia) Katarína Kužmová	1	3
(Georgia (country)) Ekaterine Gorgodze	6	6
(Mexico) Giuliana Olmos	0	2
(Italy) Giulia Gatto-Monticone	6	6
(Germany) Tamara Korpatsch	6	6
6	(Australia) Priscilla Hon	4	2

Second round
1	(Poland) Iga Świątek	6	6
(Georgia (country)) Ekaterine Gorgodze	3	3
(Italy) Giulia Gatto-Monticone	1	0
(Germany) Tamara Korpatsch	6	6

Qualifying competition
1	(Poland) Iga Świątek	6	3	6
(Germany) Tamara Korpatsch	3	6	3

==== Second qualifier ====
First round
2	(Czech Republic) Marie Bouzková	6	6
(Slovakia) Tereza Mihalíková	3	2
(Czech Republic) Tereza Martincová	6	6^{4}	1
(Cyprus) Raluca Șerban	3	7^{7}	6
(Austria) Barbara Haas	7	6
(Slovakia) Rebecca Šramková	5	4
WC	(Czech Republic) Diana Šumová	4	2
7	(Spain) Aliona Bolsova	6	6

Second round
2	(Czech Republic) Marie Bouzková	6	6
(Cyprus) Raluca Șerban	1	2
(Austria) Barbara Haas	6	5	6
7	(Spain) Aliona Bolsova	1	7	2

Qualifying competition
2	(Czech Republic) Marie Bouzková	6^{6}	1
(Austria) Barbara Haas	7^{8}	6

==== Third qualifier ====
First round
3	(Czech Republic) Tereza Smitková	7^{7}	4	6
(Czech Republic) Anastasia Zarycká	6^{4}	6	2
WC	(Czech Republic) Johana Marková	3	1
(Italy) Jasmine Paolini	6	6
(Russia) Yana Sizikova	2	1
(Germany) Antonia Lottner	6	6
(Russia) Anna Kalinskaya	6	6
5	(United States) Christina McHale	2	2

Second round
3	(Czech Republic) Tereza Smitková	1	7^{7}	3
(Italy) Jasmine Paolini	6	6^{4}	6
(Germany) Antonia Lottner	7^{7}	6
(Russia) Anna Kalinskaya	6^{2}	4

Qualifying competition
(Italy) Jasmine Paolini	4	4
(Germany) Antonia Lottner	6	6

==== Fourth qualifier ====
First round
4	(Brazil) Beatriz Haddad Maia	6	6
(Czech Republic) Barbora Štefková	4	2
(Switzerland) Jil Teichmann	6	7^{7}
(Bulgaria) Viktoriya Tomova	2	6^{2}
(Czech Republic) Denisa Allertová	6	6
(Argentina) Paula Ormaechea	3	2
(Italy) Martina Di Giuseppe	4	4
8	(Russia) Varvara Flink	6	6

Second round
4	(Brazil) Beatriz Haddad Maia	2	2
(Switzerland) Jil Teichmann	6	6
(Czech Republic) Denisa Allertová	6	7
8	(Russia) Varvara Flink	4	5

Qualifying competition
(Switzerland) Jil Teichmann	6	6
(Czech Republic) Denisa Allertová	4	2
