= 2018 Kremlin Cup – Women's singles =

Tennis tournament

Women's singles
- 2018 Kremlin Cup

Final
- Champion: (Russia) Daria Kasatkina
- Runner-up: (Tunisia) Ons Jabeur
- Score: 2–6, 7–6^{(7–3)}, 6–4

Events
Singles	men	women
Doubles	men	women
- Kremlin Cup

Julia Görges was the defending champion, but chose to compete in Luxembourg instead.

Daria Kasatkina won the title, defeating Ons Jabeur in the final, 2–6, 7–6^{(7–3)}, 6–4.

Jabeur became the first player representing Tunisia to reach a WTA final. With her win over Jabeur, Kasatkina broke inside the top 10 world ranking for the first time in her career, and qualified for the 2018 WTA Finals as the first alternate, replacing Aryna Sabalenka.

== Seeds ==
The top four seeds received a bye into the second round.

1. (Romania) Simona Halep (withdrew)
2. (Czech Republic) Karolína Plíšková (second round)
3. (United States) Sloane Stephens (second round)
4. (Netherlands) Kiki Bertens (second round)
5. (Latvia) Anastasija Sevastova (semifinals)
6. (Russia) Daria Kasatkina (champion)
7. (Belgium) Elise Mertens (first round)
8. (Estonia) Anett Kontaveit (quarterfinals)

== Draw ==
Key

- Q = Qualifier
- WC = Wild card
- LL = Lucky loser
- Alt = Alternate
- ITF = ITF entry
- PR = Protected ranking
- SR = Special ranking
- SE = Special exempt
- JE = Junior exempt
- JR = Junior Accelerator Programme entrant
- CO = College Accelerator Programme entrant
- NG = Next Gen Accelerator Program entrant
- w/o = Walkover
- r = Retired
- d = Defaulted

=== Finals ===
Semifinals
6	(Russia) Daria Kasatkina	6	6
(United Kingdom) Johanna Konta	4	3
Q	(Tunisia) Ons Jabeur	6	3	6
5	(Latvia) Anastasija Sevastova	3	6	3

Final
6	(Russia) Daria Kasatkina	2	7^{7}	6
Q	(Tunisia) Ons Jabeur	6	6^{3}	4

=== Top half ===
First round
(Russia) A Pavlyuchenkova	7	6
(Australia) A Tomljanović	5	4
(France) A Cornet	5	6	7
Q	(Russia) N Vikhlyantseva	7	2	5
(Ukraine) L Tsurenko	4	6^{1}
6	(Russia) D Kasatkina	6	7^{7}
(Belarus) A Sasnovich	6	6
(Romania) M Buzărnescu	3	4
(Australia) D Gavrilova	7^{7}	7
LL	(Russia) V Diatchenko	6^{5}	5
(United Kingdom) J Konta	6	7
7	(Belgium) E Mertens	3	5

Second round
LL	(Greece) V Grammatikopoulou	5	0
(Russia) A Pavlyuchenkova	7	6
(France) A Cornet	6	5	4
6	(Russia) D Kasatkina	3	7	6
4	(Netherlands) K Bertens	3	6	3
(Belarus) A Sasnovich	6	4	6
(Australia) D Gavrilova	4	6	3
(United Kingdom) J Konta	6	3	6

Quarterfinals
(Russia) A Pavlyuchenkova	4	3
6	(Russia) D Kasatkina	6	6
(Belarus) A Sasnovich	2	6	6^{2}
(United Kingdom) J Konta	6	2	7^{7}

Semifinals
6	(Russia) D Kasatkina	6	6
(United Kingdom) J Konta	4	3

=== Bottom half ===
First round
8	(Estonia) A Kontaveit	2	6	7
WC	(Russia) A Potapova	6	3	5
(France) K Mladenovic	6	6
WC	(Russia) A Kalinskaya	1	3
(Russia) E Makarova	1	2
Q	(Tunisia) O Jabeur	6	6
5	(Latvia) A Sevastova	4	7	6
(Slovakia) M Rybáriková	6	5	3
(Kazakhstan) Y Putintseva	6	6
(Romania) I-C Begu	2	0
Q	(Russia) I Khromacheva	3	3
Q	(Russia) V Zvonareva	6	6

Second round
8	(Estonia) A Kontaveit	6	7^{7}
(France) K Mladenovic	2	6^{3}
Q	(Tunisia) O Jabeur	6	6
3/WC	(United States) S Stephens	3	2
5	(Latvia) A Sevastova	7	4	6
(Kazakhstan) Y Putintseva	5	6	4
Q	(Russia) V Zvonareva	6	6
2	(Czech Republic) Ka Plíšková	1	2

Quarterfinals
8	(Estonia) A Kontaveit	5	1
Q	(Tunisia) O Jabeur	7	6
5	(Latvia) A Sevastova	4	7	6
Q	(Russia) V Zvonareva	6	5	3

Semifinals
Q	(Tunisia) O Jabeur	6	3	6
5	(Latvia) A Sevastova	3	6	3

== Qualifying ==
=== Seeds ===
1. (Romania) Irina-Camelia Begu (moved to main draw)
2. (Romania) Ana Bogdan (second round)
3. (Russia) Evgeniya Rodina (first round)
4. (Tunisia) Ons Jabeur (qualified)
5. (Russia) Natalia Vikhlyantseva (qualified)
6. (Russia) Vitalia Diatchenko (qualifying competition, lucky loser)
7. (Germany) Laura Siegemund (second round)
8. (Spain) Georgina García Pérez (second round)

=== Qualifiers ===
1. (Russia) Vera Zvonareva
2. (Russia) Natalia Vikhlyantseva
3. (Russia) Irina Khromacheva
4. (Tunisia) Ons Jabeur

=== Lucky losers ===
1. (Russia) Vitalia Diatchenko
2. (Greece) Valentini Grammatikopoulou

=== Draw ===
==== First qualifier ====
First round
Alt	(Romania) Alexandra Cadanțu	6	1	2
(Russia) Vera Zvonareva	4	6	6
(Russia) Olga Doroshina	6^{3}	7^{8}	3
WC	(Russia) Sofya Lansere	7^{7}	6^{6}	6
(Serbia) Nina Stojanović	5	1
(Serbia) Ivana Jorović	7	6
WC	(Uzbekistan) Nigina Abduraimova	6^{2}	6	3
7	(Germany) Laura Siegemund	7^{7}	3	6

Second round
(Russia) Vera Zvonareva	6	6
WC	(Russia) Sofya Lansere	3	0
(Serbia) Ivana Jorović	6	6
7	(Germany) Laura Siegemund	2	4

Qualifying competition
(Russia) Vera Zvonareva	6	6
(Serbia) Ivana Jorović	4	4

==== Second qualifier ====
First round
2	(Romania) Ana Bogdan	6	3	7
(Italy) Deborah Chiesa	3	6	5
(Spain) Sílvia Soler Espinosa	4	7^{7}	6
(Germany) Anna Zaja	6	6^{5}	2
WC	(Russia) Vlada Koval	3	7	7^{7}
(Germany) Sabine Lisicki	6	5	6^{4}
WC	(Russia) Polina Monova	1	6^{3}
5	(Russia) Natalia Vikhlyantseva	6	7^{7}

Second round
2	(Romania) Ana Bogdan	6	3	3
(Spain) Sílvia Soler Espinosa	2	6	6
WC	(Russia) Vlada Koval	6^{3}	3
5	(Russia) Natalia Vikhlyantseva	7^{7}	6

Qualifying competition
(Spain) Sílvia Soler Espinosa	3	3
5	(Russia) Natalia Vikhlyantseva	6	6

==== Third qualifier ====
First round
3	(Russia) Evgeniya Rodina	3	4
(Russia) Sofya Zhuk	6	6
(Russia) Irina Khromacheva	7^{7}	6
(Georgia (country)) Ekaterine Gorgodze	6^{2}	3
(Israel) Deniz Khazaniuk	7^{14}	4	0^{r}
(Uzbekistan) Sabina Sharipova	6^{12}	6	3
(Kazakhstan) Elena Rybakina	5	2
6	(Russia) Vitalia Diatchenko	7	6

Second round
(Russia) Sofya Zhuk	2	0
(Russia) Irina Khromacheva	6	6
(Uzbekistan) Sabina Sharipova	6	3	1
6	(Russia) Vitalia Diatchenko	4	6	6

Qualifying competition
(Russia) Irina Khromacheva	6	7^{8}
6	(Russia) Vitalia Diatchenko	2	6^{6}

==== Fourth qualifier ====
First round
4	(Tunisia) Ons Jabeur	1	6	6
(Hungary) Fanny Stollár	6	4	3
(Russia) Valentyna Ivakhnenko	1	3
(United Kingdom) Harriet Dart	6	6
(Greece) Valentini Grammatikopoulou	6^{7}	6	6
(Russia) Alexandra Panova	7^{9}	4	4
(Russia) Varvara Flink	7	4	2
8	(Spain) Georgina García Pérez	5	6	6

Second round
4	(Tunisia) Ons Jabeur	1	6	7^{7}
(United Kingdom) Harriet Dart	6	3	6^{1}
(Greece) Valentini Grammatikopoulou	6	6
8	(Spain) Georgina García Pérez	1	2

Qualifying competition
4	(Tunisia) Ons Jabeur	7	6
(Greece) Valentini Grammatikopoulou	5	1
