= 2019 Kremlin Cup =

- Date: 14–20 October
- Edition: 30th (men) / 24th (women)
- Category: ATP Tour 250 (men); WTA Premier (women)
- Prize money: ATP $922,520; WTA $1,032,000
- Surface: Indoor hard
- Location: Moscow, Russia
- Venue: Ice Palace Krylatskoye

Champions

Men's singles
- (Russia) Andrey Rublev

Women's singles
- (Switzerland) Belinda Bencic

Men's doubles
- (Brazil) Marcelo Demoliner / (Netherlands) Matwé Middelkoop

Women's doubles
- (Japan) Shuko Aoyama / (Japan) Ena Shibahara
- Kremlin Cup

The 2019 Kremlin Cup (also known as the 2019 VTB Kremlin Cup for sponsorship reasons) was a professional tennis tournament played on indoor hard courts. It was the 30th edition of the Kremlin Cup for the men and the 24th edition for the women. The tournament was part of the ATP Tour 250 series of the 2019 ATP Tour, and of the Premier Series of the 2019 WTA Tour. It took place at the Ice Palace Krylatskoye in Moscow, Russia, from 14 October through 20 October 2019.

== Points and prize money ==
=== Point distribution ===
Event	W	F	SF	QF	Round of 16	Round of 32	Q	Q3	Q2	Q1
Men's singles	250	150	90	45	20	0	12	—N/a	6	0
Men's doubles	250	150	90	45	0	—N/a	—N/a	—N/a	—N/a	—N/a
Women's singles	470	305	185	100	55	1	25	18	13	1
Women's doubles	470	305	185	100	1	—N/a	—N/a	—N/a	—N/a	—N/a

=== Prize money ===
Event	W	F	SF	QF	Round of 16	Round of 32	Q	Q3	Q2	Q1
Men's singles	$144,830	$78,310	$43,250	$24,575	$14,130	$8,465	$0	—N/a	$4,095	$2,045
Men's doubles *	$47,520	$24,350	$13,200	$7,550	$4,420	—N/a	—N/a	—N/a	—N/a	—N/a
Women's singles	$180,520	$96,400	$51,490	$27,680	$14,840	$9,420	$0	$4,230	$2,250	$1,125
Women's doubles *	$56,465	$30,165	$16,485	$8,390	$4,555	—N/a	—N/a	—N/a	—N/a	—N/a

_{*per team}

== ATP singles main-draw entrants ==
=== Seeds ===
Country	Player	Rank^{1}	Seed
~~RUS~~	~~Daniil Medvedev~~	~~4~~	~~1~~
RUS	Karen Khachanov	9	2
CRO	Marin Čilić	25	3
SRB	Dušan Lajović	31	4
CHI	Cristian Garín	32	5
RUS	Andrey Rublev	33	6
FRA	Adrian Mannarino	44	7
SRB	Miomir Kecmanović	50	8

- Rankings are as of October 7, 2019

=== Other entrants ===
The following players received wildcards into the singles main draw:

- (Russia) Alen Avidzba
- (Russia) Evgeny Donskoy
- (Russia) Alibek Kachmazov

The following players received entry from the qualifying draw:

- (Russia) Artem Dubrivnyy
- (Bosnia and Herzegovina) Damir Džumhur
- (Belarus) Egor Gerasimov
- (Czech Republic) Lukáš Rosol

The following player received entry as a lucky loser:

- (Serbia) Nikola Milojević

=== Withdrawals ===
Before the tournament

- (Russia) Daniil Medvedev

== ATP doubles main-draw entrants ==
=== Seeds ===
Country	Player	Country	Player	Rank^{1}	Seed
CRO	Nikola Mektić	CRO	Franko Škugor	39	1
GBR	Jamie Murray	GBR	Neal Skupski	41	2
NZL	Marcus Daniell	AUT	Philipp Oswald	93	3
BRA	Marcelo Demoliner	NED	Matwé Middelkoop	114	4

- ^{1} Rankings are as of October 7, 2019

=== Other entrants ===
The following pairs received wildcards into the doubles main draw:

- (Russia) Savriyan Danilov / (Russia) Roman Safiullin
- (Russia) Evgeny Donskoy / (Russia) Andrey Rublev

== WTA singles main-draw entrants ==
=== Seeds ===
Country	Player	Rank^{1}	Seed
UKR	Elina Svitolina	4	1
NED	Kiki Bertens	8	2
SUI	Belinda Bencic	10	3
CRO	Donna Vekić	21	4
UKR	Dayana Yastremska	23	5
LAT	Anastasija Sevastova	25	6
GRE	Maria Sakkari	30	7
RUS	Ekaterina Alexandrova	35	8

- Rankings are as of October 7, 2019

=== Other entrants ===
The following players received wildcards into the singles main draw:

- (Switzerland) Belinda Bencic
- (Russia) Anna Kalinskaya

The following players received entry from the qualifying draw:

- (Slovakia) Jana Čepelová
- (Belgium) Kirsten Flipkens
- (Russia) Varvara Gracheva
- (Estonia) Kaia Kanepi

=== Withdrawals ===
Before the tournament

- (Romania) Simona Halep → replaced by (Tunisia) Ons Jabeur
- (United Kingdom) Johanna Konta → replaced by (Russia) Svetlana Kuznetsova
- (Estonia) Anett Kontaveit → replaced by (Russia) Anastasia Potapova
- (Czech Republic) Petra Kvitová → replaced by (Slovenia) Polona Hercog
- (Spain) Garbiñe Muguruza → replaced by (France) Kristina Mladenovic
- (Czech Republic) Markéta Vondroušová → replaced by (Russia) Veronika Kudermetova

== WTA doubles main-draw entrants ==
=== Seeds ===
Country	Player	Country	Player	Rank^{1}	Seed
HUN	Tímea Babos	FRA	Kristina Mladenovic	4	1
CAN	Gabriela Dabrowski	CZE	Kateřina Siniaková	16	2
BEL	Kirsten Flipkens	USA	Bethanie Mattek-Sands	50	3
CRO	Darija Jurak	POL	Alicja Rosolska	67	4

- ^{1} Rankings are as of October 7, 2019

=== Other entrants ===
The following pair received a wildcard into the doubles main draw:

- (Russia) Alina Charaeva / (Russia) Sofya Lansere

== Champions ==
=== Men's singles ===
- (Russia) Andrey Rublev def (France) Adrian Mannarino, 6–4, 6–0

=== Women's singles ===
- (Switzerland) Belinda Bencic def. (Russia) Anastasia Pavlyuchenkova, 3–6, 6–1, 6–1

=== Men's doubles ===
- (Brazil) Marcelo Demoliner / (Netherlands) Matwé Middelkoop def. (Italy) Simone Bolelli / (Argentina) Andrés Molteni, 6–1, 6–2

=== Women's doubles ===
- (Japan) Shuko Aoyama / (Japan) Ena Shibahara def. (Belgium) Kirsten Flipkens / (United States) Bethanie Mattek-Sands, 6–2, 6–1
