= 2019 J&T Banka Prague Open – Doubles =

Doubles
- 2019 J&T Banka Prague Open

Final
- Champions: (Russia) Anna Kalinskaya (Slovakia) Viktória Kužmová
- Runners-up: (United States) Nicole Melichar (Czech Republic) Květa Peschke
- Score: 4–6, 7–5, [10–7]

Details
- Draw: 16
- Seeds: 4

Events
Singles	Doubles
- J&T Banka Prague Open

Anna Kalinskaya and Viktória Kužmová won the title, defeating defending champions Nicole Melichar and Květa Peschke in the final, 4–6, 7–5, [10–7].

== Seeds ==
1. (United States) Nicole Melichar / (Czech Republic) Květa Peschke (final)
2. (Japan) Shuko Aoyama / (United States) Abigail Spears (quarterfinals)
3. (Czech Republic) Barbora Strýcová / (Czech Republic) Markéta Vondroušová (withdrew)
4. (United States) Desirae Krawczyk / (Mexico) Giuliana Olmos (first round)

== Draw ==
Key

- Q = Qualifier
- WC = Wild card
- LL = Lucky loser
- Alt = Alternate
- ITF = ITF entry
- PR = Protected ranking
- SR = Special ranking
- SE = Special exempt
- JE = Junior exempt
- JR = Junior Accelerator Programme entrant
- CO = College Accelerator Programme entrant
- NG = Next Gen Accelerator Program entrant
- w/o = Walkover
- r = Retired
- d = Defaulted

=== Draw ===
First round
1	(United States) N Melichar (Czech Republic) K Peschke	4	6	[10]
(Switzerland) X Knoll (Serbia) A Krunić	6	3	[5]
(Sweden) C Lister (Czech Republic) R Voráčová	1	5
(Brazil) B Haddad Maia (Brazil) L Stefani	6	7
4	(United States) D Krawczyk (Mexico) G Olmos	4	6^{9}
WC	(Czech Republic) D Allertová (Czech Republic) T Smitková	6	7^{11}
(Czech Republic) L Šafářová (Czech Republic) B Štefková	4	6	[11]
(Japan) M Ninomiya (Russia) Y Sizikova	6	4	[13]
(Russia) A Kalinskaya (Slovakia) V Kužmová	7	6^{6}	[13]
(Poland) A Rosolska (Poland) I Świątek	5	7^{8}	[11]
(Japan) M Kato (Australia) S Sanders	6	3	[10]
Alt	(Russia) A Fomina (Georgia (country)) E Gorgodze	3	6	[6]
(Australia) P Hon (Switzerland) J Teichmann
(Slovenia) D Jakupović (Poland) P Kania	w/o
WC	(Czech Republic) M Bouzková (Netherlands) E Wacanno	2	1
2	(Japan) S Aoyama (United States) A Spears	6	6

Quarterfinals
1	(United States) N Melichar (Czech Republic) K Peschke	5	6	[10]
(Brazil) B Haddad Maia (Brazil) L Stefani	7	4	[5]
WC	(Czech Republic) D Allertová (Czech Republic) T Smitková	6	6
(Japan) M Ninomiya (Russia) Y Sizikova	2	4
(Russia) A Kalinskaya (Slovakia) V Kužmová	6	1	[10]
(Japan) M Kato (Australia) S Sanders	4	6	[5]
(Slovenia) D Jakupović (Poland) P Kania	0	7^{7}	[10]
2	(Japan) S Aoyama (United States) A Spears	6	6^{5}	[7]

Semifinals
1	(United States) N Melichar (Czech Republic) K Peschke	6	1	[10]
WC	(Czech Republic) D Allertová (Czech Republic) T Smitková	4	6	[8]
(Russia) A Kalinskaya (Slovakia) V Kužmová	3	7^{9}	[10]
(Slovenia) D Jakupović (Poland) P Kania	6	6^{7}	[1]

Final
1	(United States) N Melichar (Czech Republic) K Peschke	6	5	[7]
(Russia) A Kalinskaya (Slovakia) V Kužmová	4	7	[10]
