= 2019 J&T Banka Prague Open =

- Date: 29 April – 4 May
- Edition: 10th
- Category: WTA International
- Draw: 32S / 16D
- Prize money: $250,000
- Surface: Clay
- Location: Prague, Czech Republic
- Venue: TK Sparta Prague

Champions

Singles
- (Switzerland) Jil Teichmann

Doubles
- (Russia) Anna Kalinskaya / (Slovakia) Viktória Kužmová
- J&T Banka Prague Open

The 2019 J&T Banka Prague Open was a professional tennis tournament played on outdoor clay courts. It was the 10th edition of the tournament, and part of the International category of the 2019 WTA Tour. It took place at the TK Sparta Prague in Prague, Czech Republic, from 29 April to 4 May 2019. Unseeded Jil Teichmann, who qualified for the main draw, won the singles title.

== Finals ==
=== Singles ===
(Switzerland) Jil Teichmann defeated (Czech Republic) Karolína Muchová 7–6^{(7–5)}, 3–6, 6–4

- It was Teichmann's first singles title of her career.

=== Doubles ===
(Russia) Anna Kalinskaya / (Slovakia) Viktória Kužmová defeated (United States) Nicole Melichar / (Czech Republic) Květa Peschke, 4–6, 7–5, [10–7]

== Points and prize money ==
Event	W	F	SF	QF	Round of 16	Round of 32	Q	Q3	Q2	Q1
Singles	280	180	110	60	30	1	18	14	10	1
Doubles	280	180	110	60	1	—N/a	—N/a	—N/a	—N/a	—N/a

=== Prize money ===
Event	W	F	SF	QF	Round of 16	Round of 32	Q3	Q2	Q1
Singles	$43,000	$21,400	$11,300	$5,900	$3,310	$1,925	$1,005	$730	$530
Doubles	$12,300	$6,400	$3,435	$1,820	$960	—N/a	—N/a	—N/a	—N/a

== Singles main draw entrants ==
=== Seeds ===
Country	Player	Rank^{1}	Seed
~~CZE~~	~~Karolína Plíšková~~	~~4~~	~~1~~
LAT	Anastasija Sevastova	13	2
CHN	Wang Qiang	16	3
ROU	Mihaela Buzărnescu	30	4
USA	Danielle Collins	32	5
CZE	Kateřina Siniaková	41	6
SVK	Viktória Kužmová	44	7
~~CZE~~	~~Markéta Vondroušová~~	~~46~~	~~8~~
CZE	Barbora Strýcová	47	9

- Rankings are as of April 22, 2019.

=== Other entrants ===
The following players received wildcards into the singles main draw:

- (Slovakia) Jana Čepelová
- (Russia) Svetlana Kuznetsova
- (Czech Republic) Karolína Muchová

The following players received entry from the qualifying draw:

- (Austria) Barbara Haas
- (Germany) Antonia Lottner
- (Poland) Iga Świątek
- (Switzerland) Jil Teichmann

The following players received entry as lucky losers:

- (Czech Republic) Marie Bouzková
- (Germany) Tamara Korpatsch
- (Italy) Jasmine Paolini

=== Withdrawals ===
Before the tournament

- (Switzerland) Belinda Bencic → replaced by (Switzerland) Stefanie Vögele
- (Italy) Camila Giorgi → replaced by (Czech Republic) Marie Bouzková
- (Belarus) Vera Lapko → replaced by (Luxembourg) Mandy Minella
- (Czech Republic) Karolína Plíšková → replaced by (Italy) Jasmine Paolini
- (Russia) Evgeniya Rodina → replaced by (United States) Jessica Pegula
- (Czech Republic) Markéta Vondroušová → replaced by (Germany) Tamara Korpatsch

== Doubles main draw entrants ==
=== Seeds ===
Country	Player	Country	Player	Rank^{1}	Seed
USA	Nicole Melichar	CZE	Květa Peschke	25	1
JPN	Shuko Aoyama	USA	Abigail Spears	74	2
~~CZE~~	~~Barbora Strýcová~~	~~CZE~~	~~Markéta Vondroušová~~	~~101~~	~~3~~
USA	Desirae Krawczyk	MEX	Giuliana Olmos	123	4

- ^{1} Rankings as of April 22, 2019.

=== Other entrants ===
The following pairs received wildcards into the doubles main draw:

- (Czech Republic) Denisa Allertová / (Czech Republic) Tereza Smitková
- (Czech Republic) Marie Bouzková / (Netherlands) Eva Wacanno

The following pair received entry as alternates:

- (Russia) Alena Fomina / (Georgia (country)) Ekaterine Gorgodze

=== Withdrawals ===
Before the tournament

- (Switzerland) Jil Teichmann (leg injury)
- (Czech Republic) Markéta Vondroušová (viral illness)
