= 2018 Kremlin Cup – Men's doubles =

Men's doubles
- 2018 Kremlin Cup

Final
- Champions: (United States) Austin Krajicek (United States) Rajeev Ram
- Runners-up: (Belarus) Max Mirnyi (Austria) Philipp Oswald
- Score: 7–6^{(7–4)}, 6–4

Details
- Draw: 16
- Seeds: 4

Events
Singles	men	women
Doubles	men	women
← 2017 ·	Kremlin Cup	· 2019 →

Max Mirnyi and Philipp Oswald were the defending champions, but lost in the final to Austin Krajicek and Rajeev Ram, 6–7^{(4–7)}, 4–6.

== Seeds ==
1. (Chile) Julio Peralta / (Argentina) Horacio Zeballos (quarterfinals)
2. (United States) Austin Krajicek / (United States) Rajeev Ram (champions)
3. (Belarus) Max Mirnyi / (Austria) Philipp Oswald (final)
4. (Poland) Marcin Matkowski / (United States) Nicholas Monroe (first round)

== Draw ==
=== Key ===
- Q = Qualifier
- WC = Wild card
- LL = Lucky loser
- Alt = Alternate
- SE = Special exempt
- PR = Protected ranking
- ITF = ITF entry
- JE = Junior exempt
- w/o = Walkover
- r = Retired
- d = Defaulted
- SR = Special ranking

=== Draw ===
First round
1	(Chile) J Peralta (Argentina) H Zeballos	6	6
WC	(Russia) E Donskoy (Russia) I Gakhov	3	4
(Tunisia) M Jaziri (Australia) N Kyrgios	6	6
(Bosnia and Herzegovina) M Bašić (Bosnia and Herzegovina) D Džumhur	1	3
3	(Belarus) M Mirnyi (Austria) P Oswald	6	6
(France) H Nys (France) B Paire	3	2
PR	(Croatia) N Mektić (Austria) J Melzer	6	6
(Ukraine) D Molchanov (Slovakia) I Zelenay	2	2
(France) J Eysseric (France) A Mannarino	4	6	[7]
(Germany) A Mies (Chile) H Podlipnik Castillo	6	3	[10]
(Russia) K Khachanov (Russia) A Rublev	6	7
4	(Poland) M Matkowski (United States) N Monroe	4	5
(Italy) D Bracciali (Italy) A Seppi	6	1	[9]
WC	(Russia) E Karlovskiy (Russia) D Medvedev	3	6	[11]
(Czech Republic) R Jebavý (Slovakia) M Kližan	4	3
2	(United States) A Krajicek (United States) R Ram	6	6

Quarterfinals
1	(Chile) J Peralta (Argentina) H Zeballos	4	2
(Tunisia) M Jaziri (Australia) N Kyrgios	6	6
3	(Belarus) M Mirnyi (Austria) P Oswald	4	7	[13]
PR	(Croatia) N Mektić (Austria) J Melzer	6	5	[11]
(Germany) A Mies (Chile) H Podlipnik Castillo	w/o
(Russia) K Khachanov (Russia) A Rublev
WC	(Russia) E Karlovskiy (Russia) D Medvedev	3	2
2	(United States) A Krajicek (United States) R Ram	6	6

Semifinals
(Tunisia) M Jaziri (Australia) N Kyrgios
3	(Belarus) M Mirnyi (Austria) P Oswald	w/o
(Germany) A Mies (Chile) H Podlipnik Castillo	4	3
2	(United States) A Krajicek (United States) R Ram	6	6

Final
3	(Belarus) M Mirnyi (Austria) P Oswald	6^{4}	4
2	(United States) A Krajicek (United States) R Ram	7^{7}	6
