= 2018 Kremlin Cup – Women's doubles =

Women's doubles
- 2018 Kremlin Cup

Final
- Champions: (Russia) Alexandra Panova (Germany) Laura Siegemund
- Runners-up: (Croatia) Darija Jurak (Romania) Raluca Olaru
- Score: 6–2, 7–6^{(7–2)}

Events
| Singles | men | women |
| Doubles | men | women |
| ← 2017 · | Kremlin Cup | · 2019 → |

Tímea Babos and Andrea Sestini Hlaváčková were the defending champions, but both players chose not to participate. Since Babos was losing her defending championship points, Barbora Krejčíková and Kateřina Siniaková jointly attained the WTA number 1 doubles ranking at the conclusion of the tournament.

Alexandra Panova and Laura Siegemund won the title, defeating Darija Jurak and Raluca Olaru in the final, 6–2, 7–6^{(7–2)}.

== Seeds ==
1. (Romania) Irina-Camelia Begu / (Romania) Mihaela Buzărnescu (first round)
2. (United States) Raquel Atawo / (Germany) Anna-Lena Grönefeld (first round)
3. (Poland) Alicja Rosolska / (United States) Abigail Spears (first round)
4. (Georgia (country)) Oksana Kalashnikova / (Netherlands) Demi Schuurs (first round)

== Draw ==
=== Key ===
- Q = Qualifier
- WC = Wild card
- LL = Lucky loser
- Alt = Alternate
- SE = Special exempt
- PR = Protected ranking
- ITF = ITF entry
- JE = Junior exempt
- w/o = Walkover
- r = Retired
- d = Defaulted
- SR = Special ranking

=== Draw ===
First round
1 | (Romania) I-C Begu (Romania) M Buzărnescu | 2 | 1
Alt | (Russia) O Doroshina (Russia) P Monova | 6 | 6
(Russia) A Panova (Germany) L Siegemund | 4 | 7^{8} | [10]
(Russia) A Pavlyuchenkova (Russia) V Zvonareva | 6 | 6^{6} | [8]
4 | (Georgia (country)) O Kalashnikova (Netherlands) D Schuurs | 4 | 4
(United Kingdom) H Dart (Russia) A Potapova | 6 | 6
(Russia) I Khromacheva (Serbia) N Stojanović | 3 | 0
(France) K Mladenovic (Kazakhstan) G Voskoboeva | 6 | 6
(Australia) M Adamczak (Belarus) L Marozava | 2 | 5
(Russia) E Rodina (Australia) A Tomljanović | 6 | 7
WC | (Uzbekistan) N Abduraimova (Russia) A Kalinskaya | 7^{7} | 6
3 | (Poland) A Rosolska (United States) A Spears | 6^{3} | 3
(Croatia) D Jurak (Romania) R Olaru | 6 | 6
(United States) K Christian (United States) S Santamaria | 3 | 1
(Ukraine) N Kichenok (Australia) An Rodionova | 7^{7} | 3 | [10]
2 | (United States) R Atawo (Germany) A-L Grönefeld | 6^{3} | 6 | [8]

Quarterfinals
Alt | (Russia) O Doroshina (Russia) P Monova | 4 | 6 | [7]
(Russia) A Panova (Germany) L Siegemund | 6 | 3 | [10]
(United Kingdom) H Dart (Russia) A Potapova | 3 | 1
(France) K Mladenovic (Kazakhstan) G Voskoboeva | 6 | 6
(Russia) E Rodina (Australia) A Tomljanović | 6 | 1 | [6]
WC | (Uzbekistan) N Abduraimova (Russia) A Kalinskaya | 4 | 6 | [10]
(Croatia) D Jurak (Romania) R Olaru | 6 | 4 | [10]
(Ukraine) N Kichenok (Australia) An Rodionova | 4 | 6 | [8]

Semifinals
(Russia) A Panova (Germany) L Siegemund | 2 | 6 | [10]
(France) K Mladenovic (Kazakhstan) G Voskoboeva | 6 | 3 | [5]
WC | (Uzbekistan) N Abduraimova (Russia) A Kalinskaya | 3 | 4
(Croatia) D Jurak (Romania) R Olaru | 6 | 6

Final
(Russia) A Panova (Germany) L Siegemund | 6 | 7^{7}
(Croatia) D Jurak (Romania) R Olaru | 2 | 6^{2}
