= 2019 Kremlin Cup – Women's doubles =

Women's doubles
- 2019 Kremlin Cup

Final
- Champions: (Japan) Shuko Aoyama (Japan) Ena Shibahara
- Runners-up: (Belgium) Kirsten Flipkens (United States) Bethanie Mattek-Sands
- Score: 6–2, 6–1

Events
Singles	men	women
Doubles	men	women
← 2018 ·	Kremlin Cup	· 2021 →

Alexandra Panova and Laura Siegemund were the defending champions, but they chose not to defend their title.

Shuko Aoyama and Ena Shibahara won the title, defeating Kirsten Flipkens and Bethanie Mattek-Sands in the final, 6–2, 6–1.

== Seeds ==
1. (Hungary) Tímea Babos / (France) Kristina Mladenovic (semifinals)
2. (Canada) Gabriela Dabrowski / (Czech Republic) Kateřina Siniaková (semifinals)
3. (Belgium) Kirsten Flipkens / (United States) Bethanie Mattek-Sands (final)
4. (Croatia) Darija Jurak / (Poland) Alicja Rosolska (quarterfinals)

== Draw ==
=== Key ===
- Q = Qualifier
- WC = Wild card
- LL = Lucky loser
- Alt = Alternate
- SE = Special exempt
- PR = Protected ranking
- ITF = ITF entry
- JE = Junior exempt
- w/o = Walkover
- r = Retired
- d = Defaulted
- SR = Special ranking

=== Draw ===
First round
1	(Hungary) T Babos (France) K Mladenovic	7	6
(Germany) V Heisen (Chinese Taipei) Y-c Hsieh	5	1
(Ukraine) N Kichenok (Romania) R Olaru	6	7
(Russia) V Diatchenko (Ukraine) L Kichenok	2	5
3	(Belgium) K Flipkens (United States) B Mattek-Sands	6^{5}	6	[10]
(Serbia) O Danilović (Australia) A Tomljanović	7^{7}	0	[6]
(Russia) V Kudermetova (Slovenia) K Srebotnik	7^{7}	6
(Russia) E Alexandrova (Belarus) A Sasnovich	6^{4}	3
(Japan) S Aoyama (Japan) E Shibahara	6	6
WC	(Russia) A Charaeva (Russia) S Lansere	1	3
(Georgia (country)) O Kalashnikova (Russia) N Vikhlyantseva	4	3
4	(Croatia) D Jurak (Poland) A Rosolska	6	6
(Russia) A Kalinskaya (Kazakhstan) Y Putintseva	6	6
(Germany) N Geuer (France) E Lechemia	1	3
(Russia) N Dzalamidze (Belarus) L Marozava	6	3	[6]
2	(Canada) G Dabrowski (Czech Republic) K Siniaková	3	6	[10]

Quarterfinals
1	(Hungary) T Babos (France) K Mladenovic	6	7^{10}
(Ukraine) N Kichenok (Romania) R Olaru	3	6^{8}
3	(Belgium) K Flipkens (United States) B Mattek-Sands	6	6
(Russia) V Kudermetova (Slovenia) K Srebotnik	1	2
(Japan) S Aoyama (Japan) E Shibahara	6	6^{4}	[10]
4	(Croatia) D Jurak (Poland) A Rosolska	2	7^{7}	[5]
(Russia) A Kalinskaya (Kazakhstan) Y Putintseva	3	1
2	(Canada) G Dabrowski (Czech Republic) K Siniaková	6	6

Semifinals
1	(Hungary) T Babos (France) K Mladenovic	4	5
3	(Belgium) K Flipkens (United States) B Mattek-Sands	6	7
(Japan) S Aoyama (Japan) E Shibahara	7	6
2	(Canada) G Dabrowski (Czech Republic) K Siniaková	5	1

Final
3	(Belgium) K Flipkens (United States) B Mattek-Sands	2	1
(Japan) S Aoyama (Japan) E Shibahara	6	6
