= 2018 Kremlin Cup – Men's singles =

Men's singles
- 2018 Kremlin Cup

Final
- Champion: (Russia) Karen Khachanov
- Runner-up: (France) Adrian Mannarino
- Score: 6–2, 6–2

Details
- Draw: 28 (4 Q / 3 WC )
- Seeds: 8

Events
| Singles | men | women |
| Doubles | men | women |
| ← 2017 · | Kremlin Cup | · 2019 → |

Damir Džumhur was the defending champion, but lost to Egor Gerasimov in the first round.

Karen Khachanov won the title, defeating Adrian Mannarino in the final, 6–2, 6–2.

== Seeds ==
The top four seeds received a bye into the second round.

1. (Italy) Marco Cecchinato (second round)
2. (Russia) Daniil Medvedev (semifinals)
3. (Russia) Karen Khachanov (champion)
4. (Serbia) Filip Krajinović (quarterfinals)
5. (Australia) Nick Kyrgios (second round, withdrew due to elbow injury)
6. (Bosnia and Herzegovina) Damir Džumhur (first round)
7. (France) Jérémy Chardy (withdrew)
8. (Slovakia) Martin Kližan (first round)

== Draw ==
=== Key ===
- Q = Qualifier
- WC = Wild card
- LL = Lucky loser
- Alt = Alternate
- SE = Special exempt
- PR = Protected ranking
- ITF = ITF entry
- JE = Junior exempt
- w/o = Walkover
- r = Retired
- d = Defaulted
- SR = Special ranking

=== Finals ===
Semifinals
(France) Adrian Mannarino | 7 | 7
(Italy) Andreas Seppi | 5 | 5
3/WC | (Russia) Karen Khachanov | 6 | 6^{5} | 6
2 | (Russia) Daniil Medvedev | 1 | 7^{7} | 3

Final
(France) Adrian Mannarino | 2 | 2
3/WC | (Russia) Karen Khachanov | 6 | 6

=== Top half ===
First round
(France) A Mannarino | 3 | 6 | 7^{7}
WC | (Russia) E Karlovskiy | 6 | 4 | 6^{4}
(France) B Paire | 7^{8} | 2 | 6
(Germany) M Zverev | 6^{6} | 6 | 1
Q | (Belarus) E Gerasimov | 6 | 6^{5} | 6
6 | (Bosnia and Herzegovina) D Džumhur | 1 | 7^{7} | 2
(Russia) E Donskoy | 6 | 7^{12}
(Kazakhstan) M Kukushkin | 4 | 6^{10}
(France) P-H Herbert | 6 | 6
Q | (Kazakhstan) A Bublik | 3 | 4
(Italy) A Seppi | 6 | 7^{8}
8 | (Slovakia) M Kližan | 1 | 6^{6}

Second round
1 | (Italy) M Cecchinato | 2 | 3
(France) A Mannarino | 6 | 6
(France) B Paire | 4 | 4
Q | (Belarus) E Gerasimov | 6 | 6
4 | (Serbia) F Krajinović | 7 | 6
(Russia) E Donskoy | 5 | 4
(France) P-H Herbert | 6^{6} | 6^{5}
(Italy) A Seppi | 7^{8} | 7^{7}

Quarterfinals
(France) A Mannarino | 7^{7} | 6
Q | (Belarus) E Gerasimov | 6^{3} | 3
4 | (Serbia) F Krajinović | 4 | 6^{2}
(Italy) A Seppi | 6 | 7^{7}

Semifinals
(France) A Mannarino | 7 | 7
(Italy) A Seppi | 5 | 5

=== Bottom half ===
First round
5/WC | (Australia) N Kyrgios | 6 | 4 | 6
(Russia) A Rublev | 3 | 6 | 4
(Tunisia) M Jaziri | 6^{4} | 2
(Bosnia and Herzegovina) M Bašić | 7^{7} | 6
Q | (Czech Republic) L Rosol | 6 | 4 | 6
(Italy) M Berrettini | 3 | 6 | 4
LL | (Lithuania) R Berankis | 6 | 5
(Uzbekistan) D Istomin | 4 | 4^{r}
(Serbia) L Đere | 7 | 4 | 6^{2}
(Slovenia) A Bedene | 5 | 6 | 7^{7}
(Serbia) D Lajović | 6 | 2 | 6
Q | (Slovakia) F Horanský | 4 | 6 | 3

Second round
5/WC | (Australia) N Kyrgios
(Bosnia and Herzegovina) M Bašić | w/o
Q | (Czech Republic) L Rosol | 4 | 5
3/WC | (Russia) K Khachanov | 6 | 7
LL | (Lithuania) R Berankis | 3 | 7^{7} | 7^{7}
(Slovenia) A Bedene | 6 | 6^{3} | 6^{5}
(Serbia) D Lajović | 2 | 1
2 | (Russia) D Medvedev | 6 | 6

Quarterfinals
(Bosnia and Herzegovina) M Bašić | 2 | 6^{5}
3/WC | (Russia) K Khachanov | 6 | 7^{7}
LL | (Lithuania) R Berankis | 2 | 6 | 4
2 | (Russia) D Medvedev | 6 | 1 | 6

Semifinals
3/WC | (Russia) K Khachanov | 6 | 6^{5} | 6
2 | (Russia) D Medvedev | 1 | 7^{7} | 3

== Qualifying ==
=== Seeds ===
1. (Lithuania) Ričardas Berankis (qualifying competition, lucky loser)
2. (Czech Republic) Lukáš Rosol (qualified)
3. (Serbia) Nikola Milojević (first round)
4. (Russia) Alexey Vatutin (first round)
5. (Germany) Daniel Brands (first round)
6. (Belarus) Uladzimir Ignatik (first round)
7. (Germany) Rudolf Molleker (first round)
8. (Croatia) Viktor Galović (first round)

=== Qualifiers ===
1. (Kazakhstan) Alexander Bublik
2. (Czech Republic) Lukáš Rosol
3. (Slovakia) Filip Horanský
4. (Belarus) Egor Gerasimov

=== Lucky loser ===
1. (Lithuania) Ričardas Berankis

=== Qualifying draw ===
==== First qualifier ====
First round
1 | (Lithuania) Ričardas Berankis | 6 | 4 | 7
(Slovenia) Blaž Kavčič | 4 | 6 | 5
(Kazakhstan) Alexander Bublik | 6 | 6
7 | (Germany) Rudolf Molleker | 2 | 2

Qualifying competition
1 | (Lithuania) Ričardas Berankis | 4 | 6^{5}
(Kazakhstan) Alexander Bublik | 6 | 7^{7}

==== Second qualifier ====
First round
2 | (Czech Republic) Lukáš Rosol | 6 | 6
WC | (Russia) Ivan Gakhov | 3 | 3
(Austria) Jurij Rodionov | 2 | 6 | 6
6 | (Belarus) Uladzimir Ignatik | 6 | 4 | 2

Qualifying competition
2 | (Czech Republic) Lukáš Rosol | 6 | 2
(Austria) Jurij Rodionov | 2 | 0^{r}

==== Third qualifier ====
First round
3 | (Serbia) Nikola Milojević | 4 | 3
(Italy) Stefano Napolitano | 6 | 6
(Slovakia) Filip Horanský | 6^{8} | 6 | 6
8 | (Croatia) Viktor Galović | 7^{10} | 4 | 2

Qualifying competition
(Italy) Stefano Napolitano | 4 | 3
(Slovakia) Filip Horanský | 6 | 6

==== Fourth qualifier ====
First round
4 | (Russia) Alexey Vatutin | 5 | 2
PR | (Belarus) Egor Gerasimov | 7 | 6
WC | (Russia) Teymuraz Gabashvili | 4 | 7^{7} | 6
5 | (Germany) Daniel Brands | 6 | 6^{3} | 3

Qualifying competition
PR | (Belarus) Egor Gerasimov | 7^{7} | 6
WC | (Russia) Teymuraz Gabashvili | 6^{5} | 0
