= 2018 Kremlin Cup =

- Date: 15–21 October
- Edition: 29th (men) / 23rd (women)
- Surface: Hard
- Location: Moscow, Russia
- Venue: Olympic Stadium

Champions

Men's singles
- (Russia) Karen Khachanov

Women's singles
- (Russia) Daria Kasatkina

Men's doubles
- (United States) Austin Krajicek / (United States) Rajeev Ram

Women's doubles
- (Russia) Alexandra Panova / (Germany) Laura Siegemund
- Kremlin Cup

The 2018 Kremlin Cup (also known as the 2018 VTB Kremlin Cup for sponsorship reasons) was a tennis tournament played on indoor hard courts. It was the 29th edition of the Kremlin Cup for the men and the 23rd edition for the women. The tournament was part of the ATP World Tour 250 Series of the 2018 ATP World Tour, and of the Premier Series of the 2018 WTA Tour. It was the last tournament for now to be held at the Olympic Stadium in Moscow, Russia, from 15 October through 21 October 2018.

== ATP singles main-draw entrants ==
=== Seeds ===
| Country | Player | Rank^{1} | Seed |
|---|---|---|---|
| ITA | Marco Cecchinato | 21 | 1 |
| RUS | Daniil Medvedev | 22 | 2 |
| RUS | Karen Khachanov | 27 | 3 |
| SRB | Filip Krajinović | 35 | 4 |
| AUS | Nick Kyrgios | 38 | 5 |
| BIH | Damir Džumhur | 39 | 6 |
| ~~FRA~~ | ~~Jérémy Chardy~~ | ~~41~~ | ~~7~~ |
| SVK | Martin Kližan | 45 | 8 |

- Rankings are as of October 8, 2018

=== Other entrants ===
The following players received wildcards into the singles main draw:

- (Russia) Karen Khachanov
- (Australia) Nick Kyrgios
- (Russia) Evgeny Karlovskiy

The following players received entry from the qualifying draw:

- (Kazakhstan) Alexander Bublik
- (Belarus) Egor Gerasimov
- (Slovakia) Filip Horanský
- (Czech Republic) Lukáš Rosol

The following player received entry as a lucky loser:

- (Lithuania) Ričardas Berankis

=== Withdrawals ===
Before the tournament

- (France) Jérémy Chardy → replaced by (Lithuania) Ričardas Berankis
- (Uruguay) Pablo Cuevas → replaced by (Serbia) Laslo Đere
- (Portugal) João Sousa → replaced by (Russia) Evgeny Donskoy

During the tournament

- (Australia) Nick Kyrgios

=== Retirements ===
- (Uzbekistan) Denis Istomin

== ATP doubles main-draw entrants ==
=== Seeds ===
| Country | Player | Country | Player | Rank^{1} | Seed |
|---|---|---|---|---|---|
| CHI | Julio Peralta | ARG | Horacio Zeballos | 71 | 1 |
| USA | Austin Krajicek | USA | Rajeev Ram | 93 | 2 |
| BLR | Max Mirnyi | AUT | Philipp Oswald | 100 | 3 |
| POL | Marcin Matkowski | USA | Nicholas Monroe | 133 | 4 |

- ^{1} Rankings are as of October 8, 2018

=== Other entrants ===
The following pairs received wildcards into the doubles main draw:

- (Russia) Evgeny Donskoy / (Russia) Ivan Gakhov
- (Russia) Evgeny Karlovskiy / (Russia) Daniil Medvedev

=== Withdrawals ===
During the tournament

- (Russia) Karen Khachanov
- (Australia) Nick Kyrgios

== WTA singles main-draw entrants ==
=== Seeds ===
| Country | Player | Rank^{1} | Seed |
|---|---|---|---|
| ~~ROU~~ | ~~Simona Halep~~ | ~~1~~ | ~~1~~ |
| CZE | Karolína Plíšková | 6 | 2 |
| USA | Sloane Stephens | 8 | 3 |
| NED | Kiki Bertens | 10 | 4 |
| LAT | Anastasija Sevastova | 12 | 5 |
| RUS | Daria Kasatkina | 14 | 6 |
| BEL | Elise Mertens | 15 | 7 |
| EST | Anett Kontaveit | 21 | 8 |

- Rankings are as of October 8, 2018

=== Other entrants ===
The following players received wildcards into the singles main draw:

- ~~(Romania) Simona Halep~~
- (Russia) Anna Kalinskaya
- (Russia) Anastasia Potapova
- (United States) Sloane Stephens

The following players received entry from the qualifying draw:

- (Tunisia) Ons Jabeur
- (Russia) Irina Khromacheva
- (Russia) Natalia Vikhlyantseva
- (Russia) Vera Zvonareva

The following players received entry as lucky losers:

- (Russia) Vitalia Diatchenko
- (Greece) Valentini Grammatikopoulou

=== Withdrawals ===
Before the tournament

- (Slovakia) Dominika Cibulková → replaced by (Australia) Ajla Tomljanović
- (United States) Danielle Collins → replaced by (Russia) Ekaterina Makarova
- (Romania) Simona Halep → replaced by (Greece) Valentini Grammatikopoulou
- (Estonia) Kaia Kanepi → replaced by (Kazakhstan) Yulia Putintseva
- (Belarus) Aryna Sabalenka → replaced by (Russia) Vitalia Diatchenko
- (Czech Republic) Barbora Strýcová → replaced by (Romania) Irina-Camelia Begu

== WTA doubles main-draw entrants ==
=== Seeds ===
| Country | Player | Country | Player | Rank^{1} | Seed |
|---|---|---|---|---|---|
| ROU | Irina-Camelia Begu | ROU | Mihaela Buzărnescu | 50 | 1 |
| USA | Raquel Atawo | GER | Anna-Lena Grönefeld | 59 | 2 |
| POL | Alicja Rosolska | USA | Abigail Spears | 60 | 3 |
| GEO | Oksana Kalashnikova | NED | Demi Schuurs | 79 | 4 |

- ^{1} Rankings are as of October 8, 2018

=== Other entrants ===
The following pair received a wildcard into the doubles main draw:

- (Uzbekistan) Nigina Abduraimova / (Russia) Anna Kalinskaya

The following pair received entry as alternates:

- (Russia) Olga Doroshina / (Russia) Polina Monova

=== Withdrawals ===
Before the tournament

- (Romania) Ana Bogdan

== Champions ==
=== Men's singles ===
- (Russia) Karen Khachanov def. (France) Adrian Mannarino, 6–2, 6–2

=== Women's singles ===
- (Russia) Daria Kasatkina def. (Tunisia) Ons Jabeur, 2–6, 7–6^{(7–3)}, 6–4

=== Men's doubles ===
- (United States) Austin Krajicek / (United States) Rajeev Ram def. (Belarus) Max Mirnyi / (Austria) Philipp Oswald, 7–6^{(7–4)}, 6–4

=== Women's doubles ===
- (Russia) Alexandra Panova / (Germany) Laura Siegemund def. (Croatia) Darija Jurak / (Romania) Raluca Olaru, 6–2, 7–6^{(7–2)}
