= Artem Dubrivnyy =

Russian tennis player

Artem Dubrivnyy Артем Дубривный
- Full name: Artem Olegovich Dubrivnyy
- Country (sports): Russia
- Born: 31 January 1999 (age 26) Taganrog, Russia
- Height: 1.83 m (6 ft 0 in)
- Plays: Right-handed (two-handed backhand)
- Prize money: $69,712

Singles
- Career record: 0–0 (at ATP Tour level, Grand Slam level, and in Davis Cup)
- Career titles: 4 ITF
- Highest ranking: No. 395 (18 November 2019)

Doubles
- Career record: 0–0 (at ATP Tour level, Grand Slam level, and in Davis Cup)
- Career titles: 2 ITF
- Highest ranking: No. 350 (2 March 2020)

Artem Olegovich Dubrivnyy (Russian: Артём Олегович Дубривный; born 31 January 1999) is a Russian tennis player.

Dubrivnyy has a career high ATP singles ranking of No. 395 achieved on 18 November 2019 and a career high ATP doubles ranking of No. 350 achieved on 2 March 2020.

Dubrivnyy made his ATP main draw debut at the 2019 Kremlin Cup after qualifying for the singles main draw, defeating Ilya Ivashka and Filip Horanský.
