= Alen Avidzba =

Russian tennis player

Alen Avidzba Ален Авидзба
- Full name: Alen Akhrovich Avidzba
- Country (sports): Russia
- Born: 24 February 2000 (age 25) Sochi, Russia
- Height: 1.88 m (6 ft 2 in)
- Plays: Right-handed (two-handed backhand)
- Prize money: $66,760

Singles
- Career record: 1–1 (at ATP Tour level, Grand Slam level, and in Davis Cup)
- Career titles: 2 ITF
- Highest ranking: No. 380 (29 April 2019)

Doubles
- Career record: 0–0 (at ATP Tour level, Grand Slam level, and in Davis Cup)
- Career titles: 2 ITF
- Highest ranking: No. 960 (17 May 2021)

Alen Akhrovich Avidzba (Russian: Ален Ахрович Авидзба; born 24 February 2000) is a Russian tennis player.

== Career ==
Avidzba has a career high ATP singles ranking of No. 380 achieved on 29 April 2019 and a career high ATP doubles ranking of No. 960 achieved on 17 May 2021.

Avidzba made his ATP main draw debut at the 2019 Kremlin Cup after receiving a wildcard for the singles main draw.
