= Savriyan Danilov =

Russian tennis player

Savriyan Danilov Савриян Данилов
- Full name: Savriyan Alexeyevich Danilov
- Country (sports): Russia
- Residence: Moscow, Russia
- Born: 3 June 2000 (age 25) Moscow, Russia
- Height: 1.88 m (6 ft 2 in)
- Plays: Right-handed (two-handed backhand)
- Prize money: $46,864

Singles
- Career record: 0–0 (at ATP Tour level, Grand Slam level, and in Davis Cup)
- Career titles: 1 ITF
- Highest ranking: No. 556 (25 November 2019)
- Current ranking: No. 889 (15 December 2025)

Doubles
- Career record: 0–0 (at ATP Tour level, Grand Slam level, and in Davis Cup)
- Career titles: 0 ITF
- Highest ranking: No. 658 (11 November 2019)
- Current ranking: No. 1,318 (15 December 2025)
- Last updated on: 15 December 2025.

Savriyan Alexeyevich Danilov (Russian: Савриян Алексеевич Данилов; born 3 June 2000) is a Russian tennis player.

Danilov has a career high ATP singles ranking of No. 556 achieved on 25 November 2019 and a career high ATP doubles ranking of No. 658 achieved on 11 November 2019.

Danilov made his ATP main draw debut at the 2019 Kremlin Cup after receiving a wildcard for the doubles main draw partnering Roman Safiullin.

Danilov currently attends the University of San Diego.
