= Anna Kalinskaya =

Russian tennis player (born 1998)

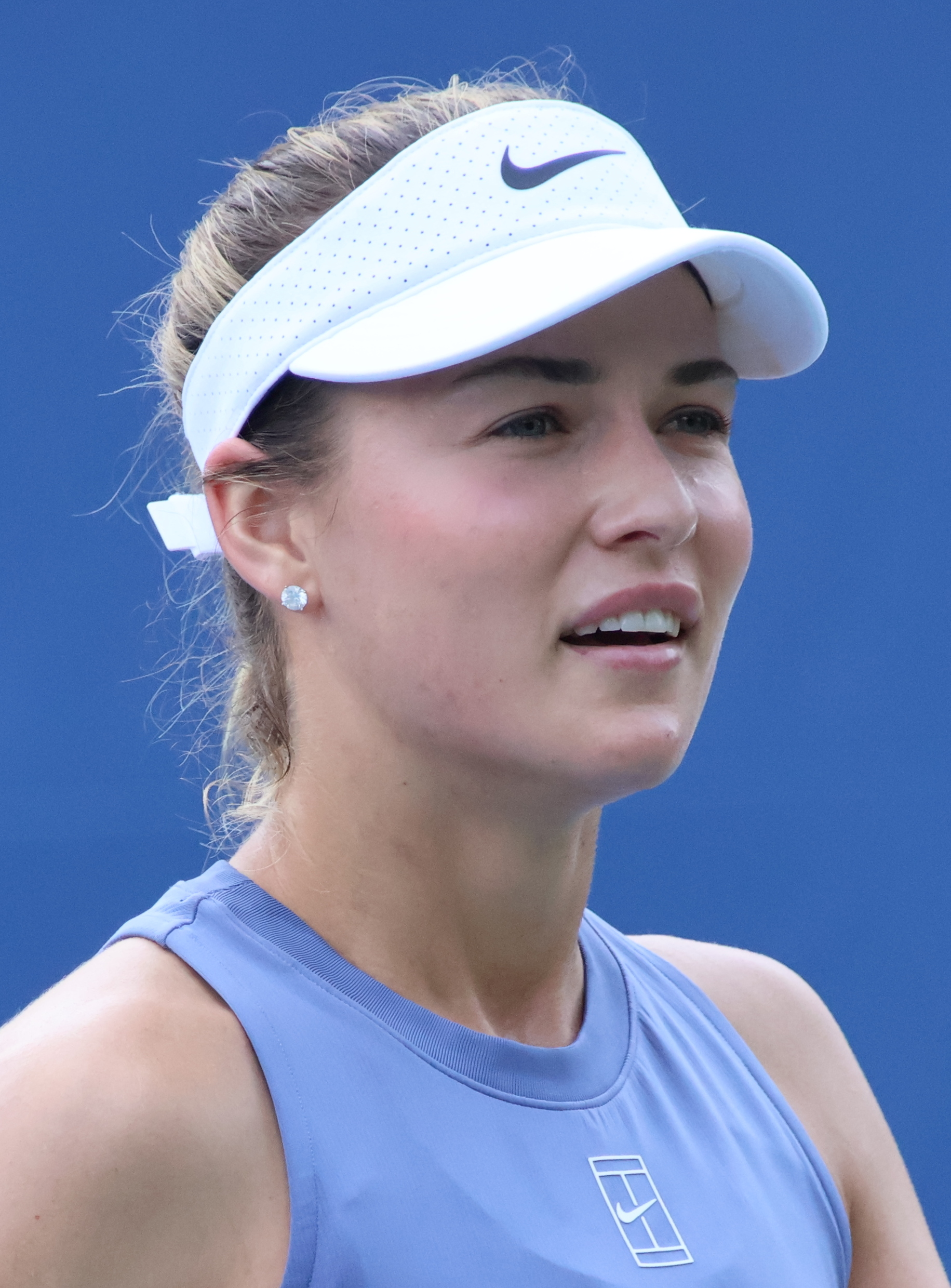
- Kalinskaya at the 2025 Washington Open
- Full name: Anna Nikolayevna Kalinskaya
- Native name: Анна Николаевна Калинская
- Country (sports): Russia
- Born: 2 December 1998 (age 27) Moscow, Russia
- Height: 1.75 m (5 ft 9 in)
- Turned pro: 2016
- Plays: Right-handed (two-handed backhand)
- Coach: Patricia Tarabini
- Prize money: US$ 7,948,830

Singles
- Career record: 350–218
- Career titles: 1 WTA 125
- Highest ranking: No. 11 (28 October 2024)
- Current ranking: No. 23 (19 October 2026)

Grand Slam singles results
- Australian Open: QF (2024)
- French Open: QF (2026)
- Wimbledon: 4R (2024)
- US Open: 4R (2026)

Doubles
- Career record: 147–81
- Career titles: 4
- Highest ranking: No. 37 (11 August 2025)
- Current ranking: No. 509 (19 October 2026)

Grand Slam doubles results
- Australian Open: QF (2023)
- French Open: 2R (2022, 2024)
- Wimbledon: QF (2025)
- US Open: 3R (2019)

Team competitions
- Fed Cup: 2–2
- Last updated on: 21 October 2026.

Anna Nikolayevna Kalinskaya (Note: Russian: Анна Николаевна Калинская, IPA: [ˈanːə kɐˈlʲinskəjə]) (born 2 December 1998) is a Russian professional tennis player. She reached career-high rankings of world No. 11 in singles on 28 October 2024, and No. 37 in doubles on 11 August 2025. On the WTA Tour, she has won four doubles titles. She also has won one singles title on the WTA Challenger Tour, and seven singles and nine doubles titles on the ITF World Tennis Tour. Her best singles performance at a major event is reaching the quarterfinals at the 2024 Australian Open and 2026 French Open.

She began her career at age 17 by winning the girls' doubles title at the 2016 Australian Open, alongside Tereza Mihalíková. Previously, she made the final at the 2015 French Open in the girls' singles event. She also made the final of the 2015 US Open in the doubles event, with compatriot Anastasia Potapova.

In 2025, she won her biggest doubles title with Sorana Cîrstea at the WTA 1000 Madrid Open.

== Early life ==
Anna Kalinskaya was born in Moscow to father Nikolay and mother Elena, both former professional badminton players. Her brother, Nikolay Kalinsky, is a footballer.

Her mother and grandmother are from Dnipro, Ukraine, where she would visit during the summer and attend tennis academies for fun. At the age of 14, she moved to the United States to pursue tennis. She also attended the Mouratoglou Tennis Academy in France before moving back to Moscow to be closer to family. She currently trains in Miami.

== Juniors ==
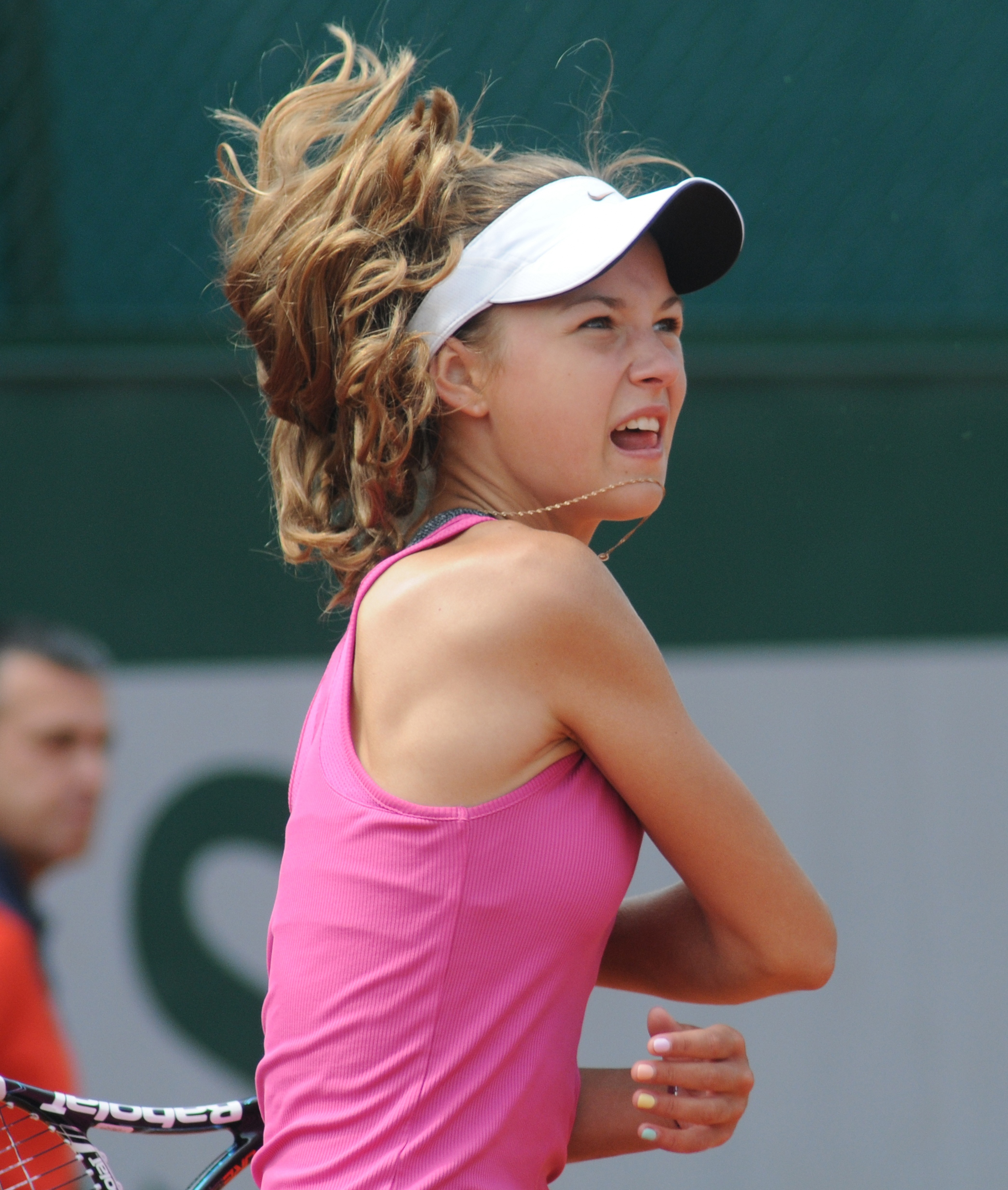
Kalinskaya as a junior at the 2014 French Open.

Kalinskaya's highest combined junior ranking was No. 3. (Note: To obtain data from this reference, select the corresponding year on the WTA or ITF website.) She won a total of sixteen titles, eight in singles events and eight in doubles. Her most significant title was in doubles at the 2016 Australian Open. In addition, she reached the finals of both the 2015 French Open in singles and the 2015 US Open in doubles.

=== Singles ===
In 2012, she won the Grade-5 Green Cup at her first singles event on the ITF Junior Circuit. In 2013, Kalinskaya reached the quarterfinals of the Grade-2 tournament in Šiauliai, Lithuania, and the semifinals of the Grade-2 tournament in Kazan, Russia. She won her second singles title at the Grade-3 tournament in Almaty, Kazakhstan, and her third singles title at the Grade-4 event in Riga, Latvia. She advanced to the finals of the Grade-4 Tallinn tournament in Estonia, but finished as the runner-up. By the end of the year, she had won the title at the Grade- 3 Larnaca tournament in Cyprus, and she finished as runner-up at the Grade-3 tournament in Nonthaburi, Thailand.

In the 2014 season she won the Grade-2 Bratislava tournament, defeating Slovak Viktória Kužmová, who later became her doubles partner in senior events. With Kužmová, she won her first doubles title in 2019. In March, she won the Grade-2 Šiauliai tournament, followed by reaching the final of the Grade-2 Kazan event. At the 2014 French Open, she made her Grand Slam tournament debut but was eliminated in the first round. She reached the semifinals of the Grade-2 Moscow tournament and the final of the Grade-1 Berlin tournament. She had better results in late August, by winning her first Grade-1 title in College Park, Maryland. Despite the early loss at her major debut, Kalinskaya redeemed herself with the quarterfinal of the US Open. In late October, she reached the quarterfinals of the Osaka Mayor's Cup.

In March 2015, she began her season with two Grade-1 quarterfinals appearances in Kazan and Beaulieu-sur-Mer, on the French Riviera. She debuted at the Grade-A Trofeo Bonfiglio in Milan, Italy, but lost in the second round to Canadian Katherine Sebov. Kalinskaya hit her peak at her French Open debut as she advanced to the final. She lost to Paula Badosa in straight sets. In late August 2015 she won the title at the Grade-1 in College Park, Maryland, where she also was defending champion. During that year she was eliminated in the first rounds of the Wimbledon and the US Open. Kalinskaya played only two tournaments in 2016. Her first was the Grade-1 Traralgon tournament in Australia, where she lost to Vera Lapko in the final. She finished her singles junior career with a quarterfinal at the 2016 Australian Open, losing again to Lapko.

=== Doubles ===
Kalinskaya was successful in doubles events. Her first final was in March 2013 at the Grade-2 Šiauliai tournament. The following week she advanced to another final, but still without a title. In September 2013, she won her first title at the Grade-3 Larnaca tournament, alongside Russian player Gyulnara Nazarova.

Her 2014 season started by taking the title at the Grade-2 Bratislava tournament. The following week she went even further, winning her first Grade-1 Přerov tournament in the Czech Republic. A month later, she took her third title of the year at the Grade-2 Šiauliai tournament. She won all three titles alongside fellow Russian Evgeniya Levashova. In late May, she reached the final of the Grade-1 Charleroi tournament in Belgium. At the 2014 French Open, she made her doubles major main-draw debut but lost in the first round. In late June, she won the Grade-2 Moscow tournament. She also won another title in August at the Grade-1 College Park tournament. At the US Open, she lost in the second round. Later, she made her doubles debut at the Osaka Mayor's Cup, advancing to the semifinals.

During the first half of 2015, Kalinskaya struggled. However, things improved in August when she defended her next title at the Grade-1 College Park tournament. Her next stop was the US Open where she reached her first doubles final at a Grand Slam event. Alongside Anastasia Potapova, she lost to Kužmová and Aleksandra Pospelova. She finished her doubles junior career by taking the title at the 2016 Australian Open, winning with Slovak player Tereza Mihalíková.

== Career ==
=== 2014–2015: Professional debut ===
==== Singles ====
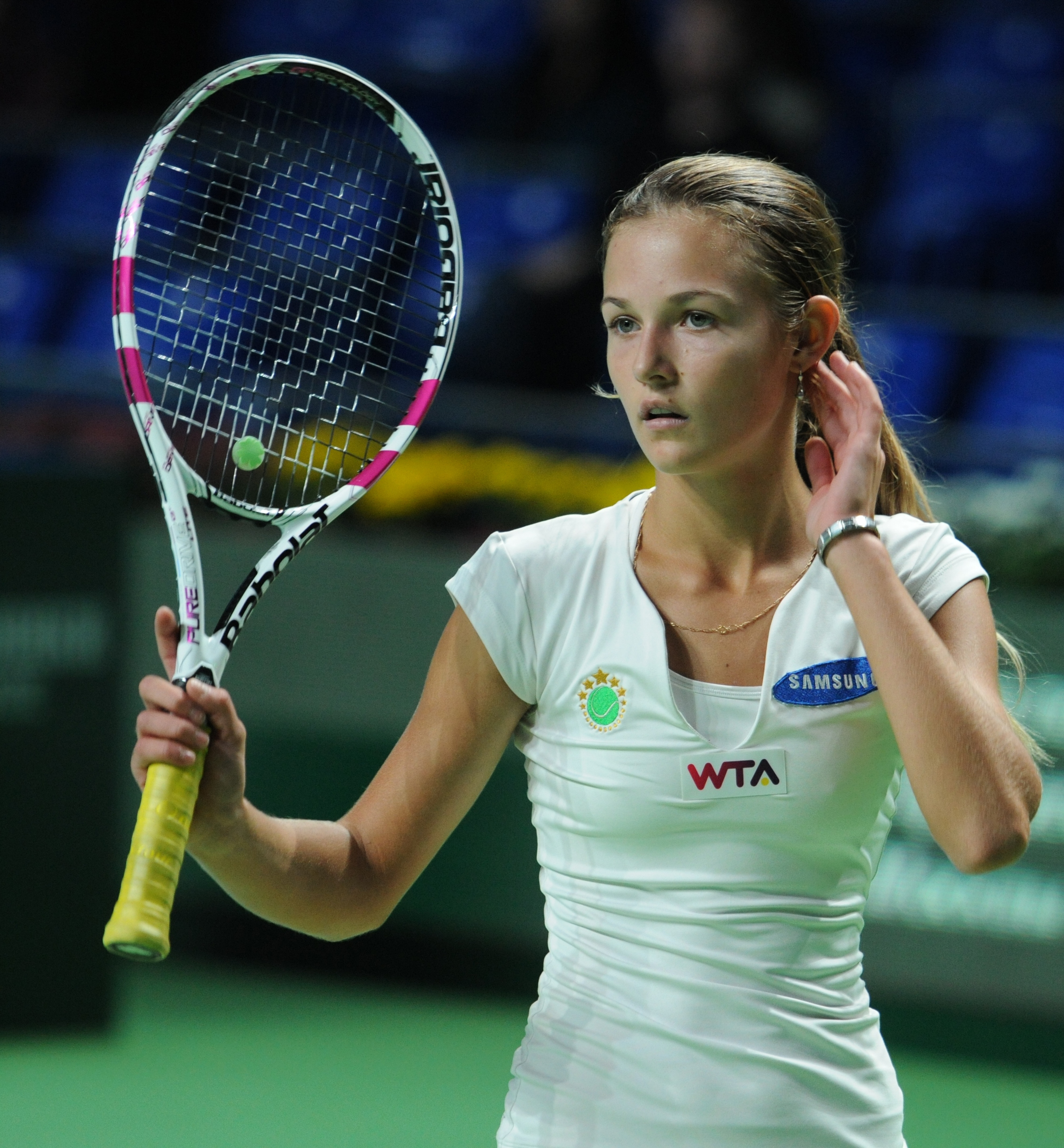
Kalinskaya at the 2014 Kremlin Cup, where she made her first attempts on the WTA Tour

Kalinskaya made her WTA Tour debut at the Premier-level 2014 Kremlin Cup at age 15. After receiving a qualifying wildcard, she lost to her compatriot and wildcard entrant Polina Monova. In January 2015, she began playing on the ITF Women's Circuit. After her first two 25k tournaments in the United States, she progressed to tournaments in Turkey. At Antalya, she recorded her first win as a senior, defeating Turkish player Cempre Anil. She continued in the same city the following week, reaching her first final, but losing there to Chinese player Lu Jiajing. That year, she made her debut in the WTA rankings as world No. 1,201.

After two 25k tournaments in Moscow, Kalinskaya attempted another WTA Tour debut at the Kremlin Cup where she received a qualifying wildcard. She lost in the final stage to eventual semifinalist Daria Kasatkina. By the end of the year, she played two 10k tournaments in Port El Kantaoui, Tunisia. She reached the semifinals in the first and made it to the finals of the second, where she was forced to give a walkover to Bosnian player Ema Burgić. The result pushed her into the top 600.

==== Doubles ====
She started well in doubles, winning the 25k Sunrise, Florida tournament. This result put her on the WTA rankings in doubles, making the top 700. She competed in four more ITF tournaments without much success.

=== 2016: Success on the ITF Women's Circuit ===
==== Singles ====
In early February 2016, Kalinskaya had another chance to debut at the WTA Tour. Having handed a wildcard, she played in the qualifying of the Premier-level St. Petersburg Ladies' Trophy but lost to Kateřina Siniaková. In late March, she reached the final of a 10k event in Manama, Bahrain where she lost to Mihalíková. A month later, she triumphed in Kazakhstan at a 10k event, winning every match in straight sets. In June, she succeeded in Belarus where she first won the 25k Minsk tournament. She followed that up with a final in the same city, but she was forced to retire during the second set.

Her third title of the year came in July at a 25k event in Aschaffenburg in Bavaria, Germany where she bested Dalila Jakupović in a three-set match. In August, Kalinskaya won her fourth title of the year at the 25k Kharkiv tournament and entered the top 200 in September. At the Kremlin Cup, she made her WTA Tour debut, after receiving a wildcard for the third year in a row, and lost in the first round to Kristina Mladenovic. She finished the year with the 25k Minsk final, but let her opponent win without playing. As a result, she started a new phase, gradually transitioning to the main tour. Since her top 200 debut in September 2016, she spent the rest of the year there.

==== Doubles ====
Kalinskaya started her doubles season in Bahrain by winning the title in Manama in April. A month later, she won the 100k Trnava tournament in Slovakia, her first significant title in both events. During the summer, she won two 25k events in Minsk, Belarus and Darmstadt, Germany, respectively. At the Kremlin Cup, she made her WTA Tour doubles debut and recorded her first win. In November, she won another 25k title in Minsk. As a result, she made her debut in the top 150.

=== 2017: Transition to WTA Tour, Fed Cup debut ===
==== Singles ====
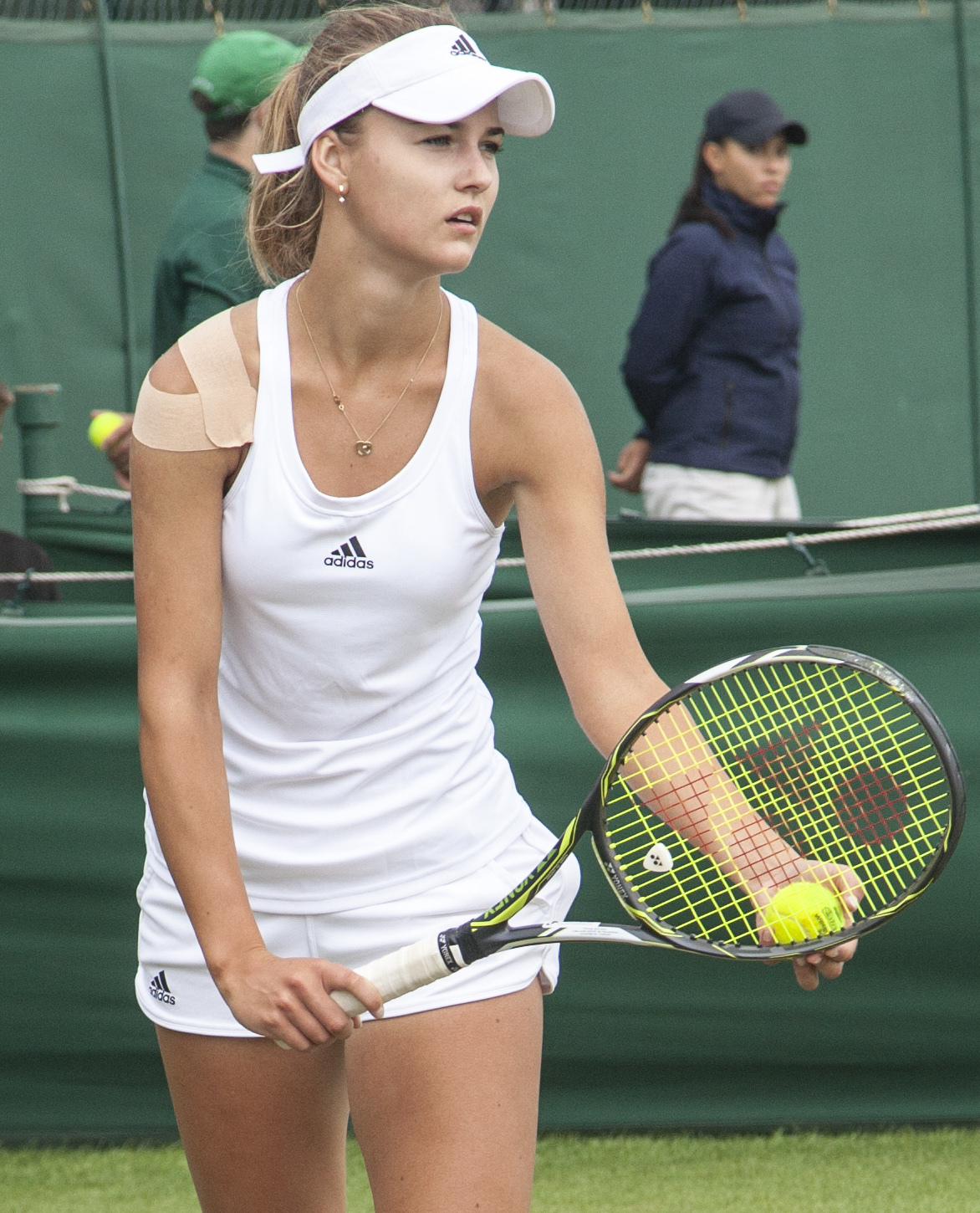
Kalinskaya at the 2017 Wimbledon Championships.

Kalinskaya started the year as a top 200 player, making her major debut in qualifying at the Australian Open. Her first opponent was Swiss top seed Stefanie Vögele, to whom she lost in a three-set match. She was handed a wildcard into the main draw of the St. Petersburg Trophy, and was beaten by Australian Daria Gavrilova in the first round. In early March, at the Malaysian Open, she recorded her first main-draw win defeating French top-30 player Caroline Garcia in straight sets. Still finding her way to the top 100, she had to play ITF events as well, so in China at two 60k tournaments: first destination was Zhuhai where she was eliminated in the first round by former top-10 player Patty Schnyder, before she headed to Shenzhen where she reached semifinals, but lost to compatriot Ekaterina Alexandrova.

From April to September 2017, Kalinskaya played in Europe at ITF tournaments in France and Germany. On the WTA Tour, she reached two second rounds, one at the Istanbul Cup in late April, and the other at the Swiss Open in July. In addition, she lost in the first qualifying round of both the French Open and Wimbledon.

After being knocked out in the first round of the US Open qualifying, she traveled to Georgia where she finished runner-up in the 25k Batumi Ladies Open. However, she struggled again, after reaching second round of the 100k Neva Cup in St. Petersburg, losing in the qualifying round of the Tashkent Open and the first round of the 25k Óbidos event in Portugal. Despite early loss in Óbidos, Kalinskaya remained and won again the following week, defeating Magdalena Fręch in the final. The third was promising as well, but she lost to British player Katie Swan. Without any oscillations in her WTA ranking, Kalinskaya spent the year inside the top 200. On September 9, she reached her then-career high of No. 14.

==== Doubles ====
Her doubles performances during the year were primarily on the ITF Circuit. In the first two months she reached two semifinals, first at the 60k Open Andrézieux-Bouthéon in France in January, and then at the 25k AK Ladies Open in Germany in February. In the meantime, she played in the quarterfinals at St. Petersburg, and made her debut at the Fed Cup in doubles. In July, she had advanced to her first tour semifinal, after winning two matches alongside Russian player Evgeniya Rodina. Two weeks later, she won the 25k+H Bad Saulgau tournament in Germany with Turkish player İpek Soylu. On 16 October 2017, she achieved a new career-high ranking, No. 114 in the world.

=== 2018: Major debut ===
==== Singles ====
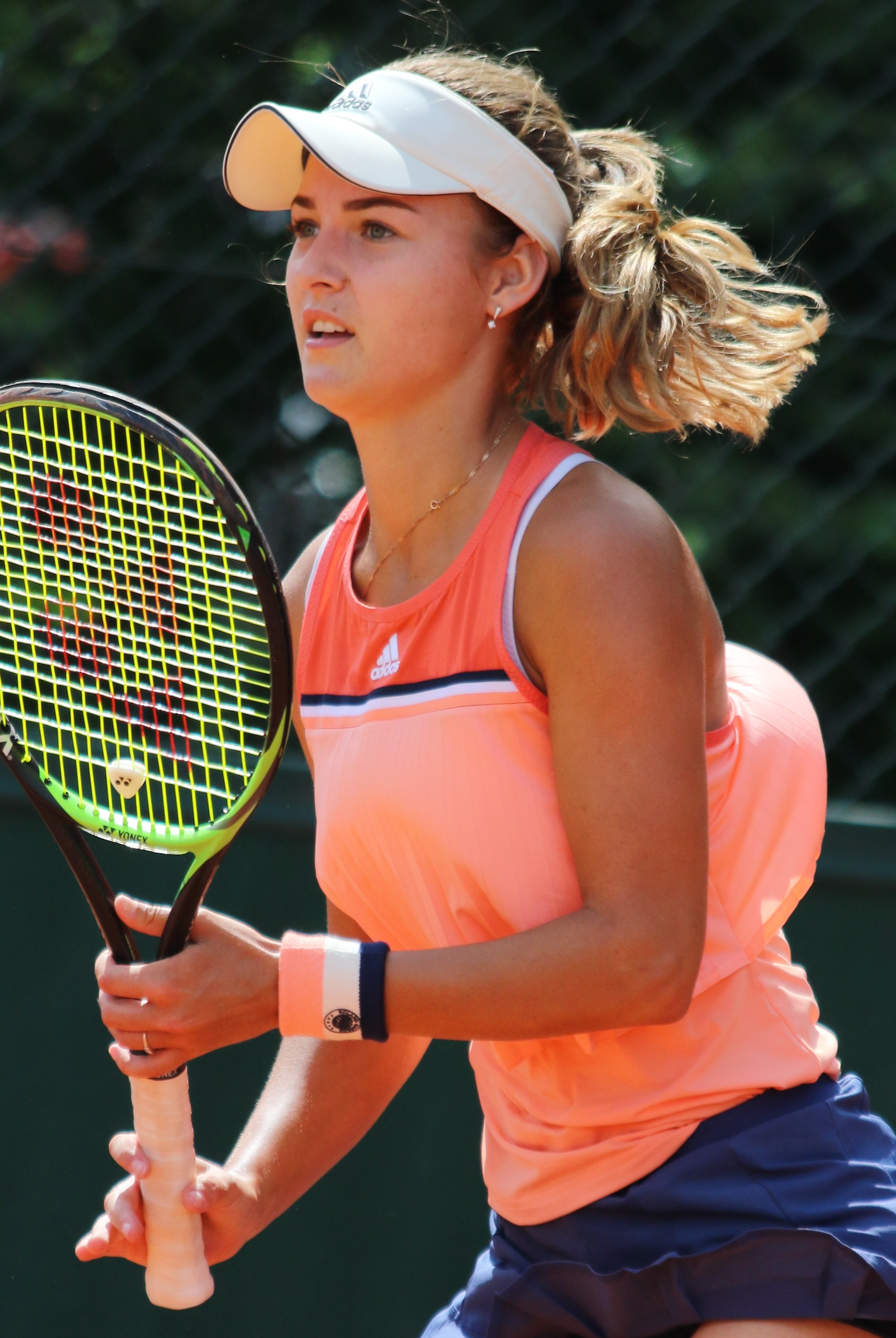
Kalinskaya at 2018 French Open

Given her ranking, Kalinskaya often switched between ITF Circuit and WTA Tour during the year. She began in Australia, where her first tournament was the 25k Playford International, but she lost in the first round to French player Jessika Ponchet. Then she shifted to Melbourne to play at the Australian Open qualifying. She reached the main draw for the first time in her career. Her first opponent in the main draw was Italian player Camila Giorgi, but Kalinskaya lost in two sets. During February, she failed to qualify in two tournaments, the (St. Petersburg Trophy, and the Hungarian Ladies Open). However, she made her singles debut in the Fed Cup. In Bratislava, she lost in three sets to Slovak player Magdaléna Rybáriková. For Kalinskaya, March brought good performances on the ITF Circuit. In China, she first played at the 60k Zhuhai event, and reached the semifinals. She followed this with a final appearance at the 60k Shenzhen Open. Her last tournament in March was in France at the 60k Croissy-Beaubourg event, where she reached the semifinals.

During the next five months, still in France, she reached the semifinals of the 100k Contrexéville Open in the middle of July. Then she failed to qualify in both the French Open, and the Wimbledon.

She made the main draw of the US Open for the first time in her career. In the first round, she was defeated by world No. 9, German player Julia Görges, in three sets. She continued to struggle with losses to Serbian Olga Danilović in the first round of the Tashkent Open, and to Russian Natalia Vikhlyantseva at the Linz Open qualifying round. Next, she made another appearance at the Kremlin Cup as a wildcard, but was ousted by Mladenovic in a repeat of their 2016 encounter. Despite not reaching any new career-highest singles rankings, she spent all year in the top 200.

==== Doubles ====
After a few early losses during the first two months, she won the title at the 60k Pingshan Open alongside Slovak player Viktória Kužmová. Two weeks later she won another 60k title, this time in Croissy-Beaubourg, again with Kužmová. A month later, she reached the semifinals of the Istanbul Cup where she played with compatriot Natela Dzalamidze. At the French Open, she notched her major debut in doubles, but lost in the first round with fellow Russian Ekaterina Makarova. In Wimbledon, she lost in the second qualifying round. She finished the year by making the semifinals of the Kremlin Cup. On 28 May 2018, she reached a new career-high of 106.

=== 2019: WTA Tour semifinal, first top-10 win, top 100 debut ===
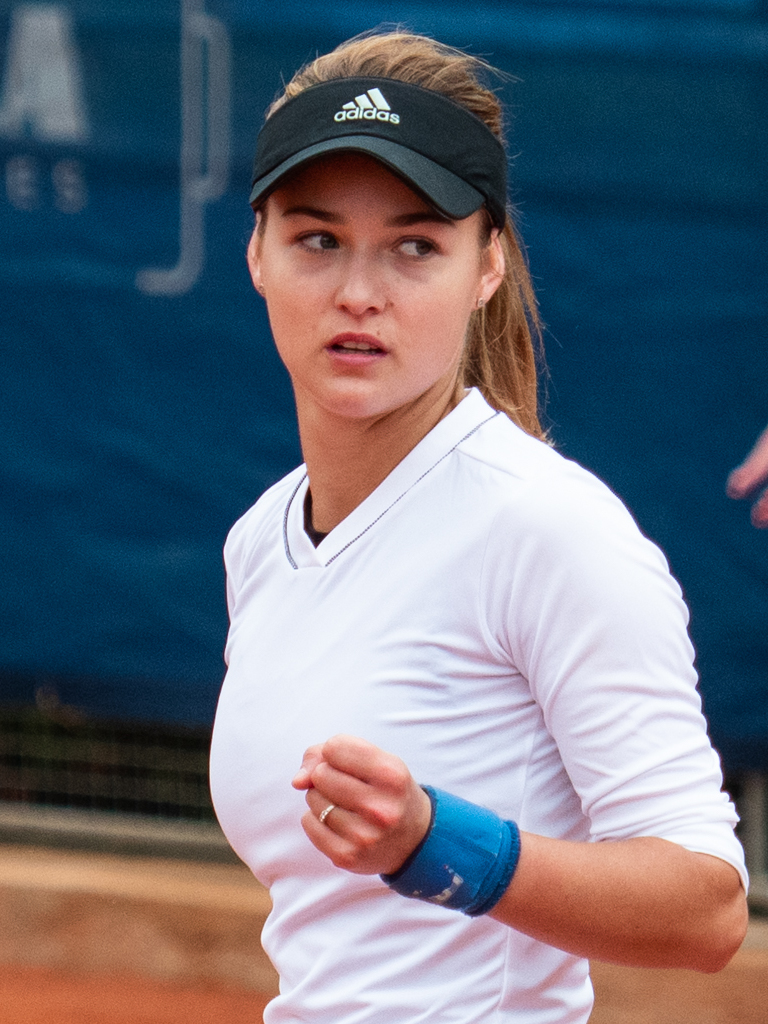
Kalinskaya at the 2019 Prague Open.

==== Singles ====
Kalinskaya started the year with a triumph at the W25 Playford International, defeating Elena Rybakina in the final. Her victories continued with three more, first qualifying for the Australian Open. In the main draw, she was defeated by world No. 11, Aryna Sabalenka, in the first round. She struggled to reach main draws at many tournaments, including the Premier-level St. Petersburg Trophy, Qatar Ladies Open and Stuttgart Open. In the middle of May, she won the W60 Open Saint-Gaudens, defeating Romanian player Ana Bogdan in the final. While still in France, Kalinskaya tried to enter the main draw of the French Open, the only major where she still had not succeeded. However, for the third year in a row she failed to qualify.

As a warm-up for the grass-court season, Kalinskya played in England at the W100 Surbiton Trophy. After defeating Serbian Ivana Jorović in the first round, she lost to Rybáriková in a three-set match. Right after that she traveled to the Netherlands to play at the Rosmalen Open. Despite losing in the first round, this was her first tour main-draw performance of the year. Preparing for Wimbledon, she played at the Birmingham Classic, but was stopped in the final qualifying stage. She hired the Argentinian Patricia Tarabini to be her coach. Still looking for her first major match win, she was qualified in Wimbledon after three straight-sets wins, before losing to Magda Linette in the first round.

In August, Kalinskaya showed an impressive North American hardcourt swing, reaching the semifinals of a WTA Tour event for the first time in her career at the Washington Open. She survived the qualifying rounds, before making a huge comeback against reigning Puerto Rican Olympic champion Monica Puig, and stunning Mladenovic for her first win over the Frenchwoman in three attempts. Her run was stopped by eventual champion Jessica Pegula in the semifinals. At the US Open, Kalinskaya qualified again. In the first round, she stunned then-world No. 10, Sloane Stephens, in her Arthur Ashe Stadium debut, winning in straight sets. However, she was unable to repeat her win, as she was defeated by American wildcard Kristie Ahn in her next match.

Another tour quarterfinal soon followed in late September at the Tashkent Open, where she beat German player Tatjana Maria en route. Despite losing her quarterfinal match against Katarina Zavatska, she immediately secured her top 100 debut. Two weeks later, she played at the Kremlin Cup with which she closed her season. In the first round, she defeated Anastasia Potapova but then lost to Ekaterina Alexandrova.

==== Doubles ====
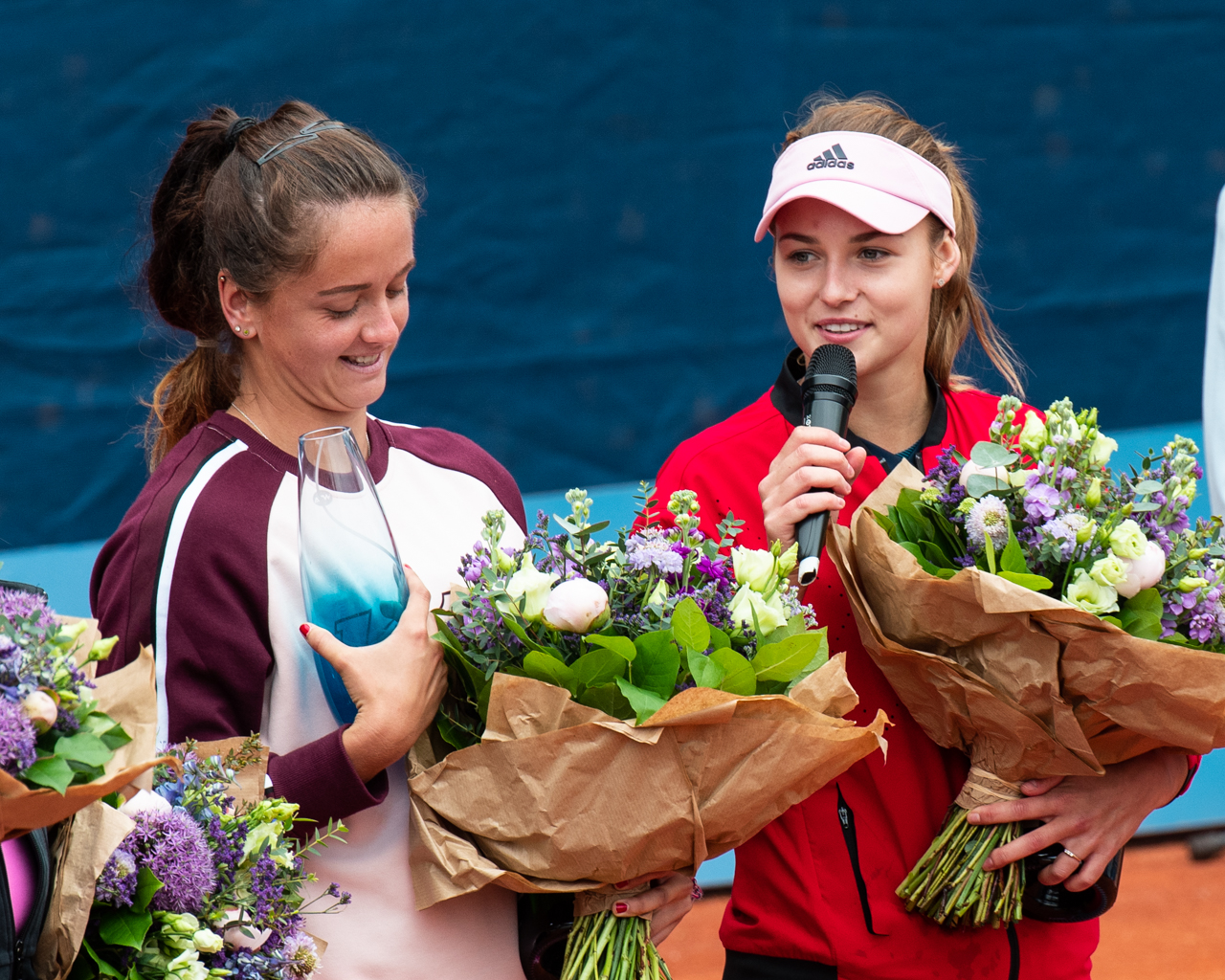
Kalinskaya alongside Kužmová (left) at the speech ceremony, after winning the 2019 Prague Open.

Kalinskaya started off well in her doubles events from start. On her first event, the St. Petersburg Ladies' Trophy, she made it to the final alongside Kužmová. In late April, they played at the Prague Open and triumphed. They took the title, after defeating two top-15 players, Květa Peschke and Nicole Melichar. It was the first career title for Kalinskaya. Two weeks later, she competed at the 60k Open Saint-Gaudens, and finished runner-up alongside Russian Sofya Lansere. Her American journey started well as she reached semifinals of the Washington Open alongside Miyu Kato. Her next stop was the US Open, where she reached the third round. Partnering with Yulia Putintseva, she lost to top seeds Tímea Babos and Mladenovic. It was the first time that Kalinskaya reached a third round in either of two events. Just as in singles, this was the first season that she made it inside the top 100 in doubles, reaching No. 72 in late September.

=== 2020: Pandemic-affected season ===
Because of the lack of tournaments due to the COVID-19 pandemic, Kalinskaya did not play as often. Her season began with the Australian Open, where she qualified for the main draw after saving match points to beat China's Wang Xinyu in the final qualifying round. In the first round of the main draw, she faced unseeded Chinese player Zheng Saisai, but she did not prevail. Before the pandemic forced the cancellation of the tennis season in March, Kalinskaya lost in the first round of the Mexican Open, followed by another first-round loss, this time at the WTA 125 Indian Wells Challenger.

When she resumed the tour in August, she qualified for the main draw of the Lexington Challenger defeating two American players. Then in the main draw she lost to Swiss player Jil Teichmann. She qualified anew at the following Premier 5 Cincinnati Open. This was her first time in the main draw of a Premier 5/Mandatory tournament, but she fell in the first round to Czech player Marie Bouzková, in straight sets. At the US Open, Kalinskaya beat Serbian Nina Stojanović to reach the second round for the second consecutive year, but lost to Czech 20th seed Karolína Muchová. She tried to qualify for another Premier 5 tournament, the Italian Open, but lost in the final qualifying stage. In late September she finished the season with a main-draw, first-round loss at the postponed French Open. Despite the losses, she completed at least one main-draw performance at all four majors. Kalinskaya sank to No. 117 in August, her lowest of the season.

=== 2021: Struggles followed by resurgence ===
==== Singles ====
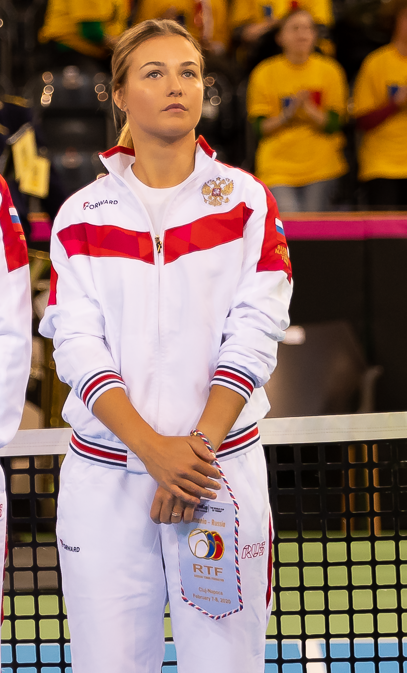
Kalinskaya at the 2020–21 Billie Jean King Cup against Romania.

She struggled in her first three tournaments. Her season began with the Premier Gippsland Trophy as part of the Australian Open warm-up, but she was eliminated in the first round by Katie Boulter. Due to her low ranking, she was forced to play to qualify in the Australian Open. She started well, winning her first match, but was unable to qualify for the main draw when she lost to French player Clara Burel in three sets. The Abierto Zapopan in Guadalajara was her third tournament, and she lost to Canadian Leylah Fernandez.

Following these weak performances, she began a resurgence at the Monterrey Open, reaching the quarterfinals as a qualifier after beating second seed Nadia Podoroska of Argentina in the first round. Her run continued the following week as a wildcard at the Miami Open, where she reached the third round of a WTA 1000 tournament for the first time in her career, and lost to 12th seed Garbiñe Muguruza, despite leading 3-0 in the deciding set. Her struggles continued with a first-round loss at the Copa Colsanitas, while also failing to reach the main draw of the Madrid Open. However, in late May she defeated former top-10 Kristina Mladenovic in the first round of the Serbia Open. After being eliminated in the first round of qualifying at the French Open, she managed to qualify at the Wimbledon. Kalinskaya qualified for the main draw for the second time in succession, after beating Australian Priscilla Hon from 0-3 down in the decider. In the main draw she lost to Colombian qualifier Camila Osorio. At the US Open, she lost in the second qualifying round to Greek player Valentini Grammatikopoulou. Thus she ended her three-in-a-row streak in the main draw.

After falling to No. 151 in the singles rankings in October, Kalinskaya returned with a fourth-round appearance at the Indian Wells Open as a qualifier, scoring her third top-50 win of the year over Sara Sorribes Tormo of Spain in the process. In the fourth round, she lost to Ons Jabeur. The following week she qualified for the main draw at the Kremlin Cup, but was forced to retire in the second round against Greek player Maria Sakkari due to an injury. She ended her season with a quarterfinal appearance at the Courmayeur Ladies Open, beating sixth seed Alison Riske.

==== Doubles ====
The Yarra Valley Classic was her first doubles event of the year, and she made it into the final alongside Kužmová, before losing to the Japanese duo of Ena Shibahara and Shuko Aoyama. Things also improved at the Australian Open, when she reached her first third round there, and her second at any Grand Slam tournament. At the French Open, she was eliminated in the first round but went one step further at Wimbledon. Despite losing in the first round of the US Open, this was the first season she played all four majors. In the second half of September she won her second WTA Tour doubles title at the Slovenia Open, alongside Mihalíková. On 22 February 2021, she reached a career-high doubles ranking of 69.

=== 2022: New career-high rankings, second top 10 win ===
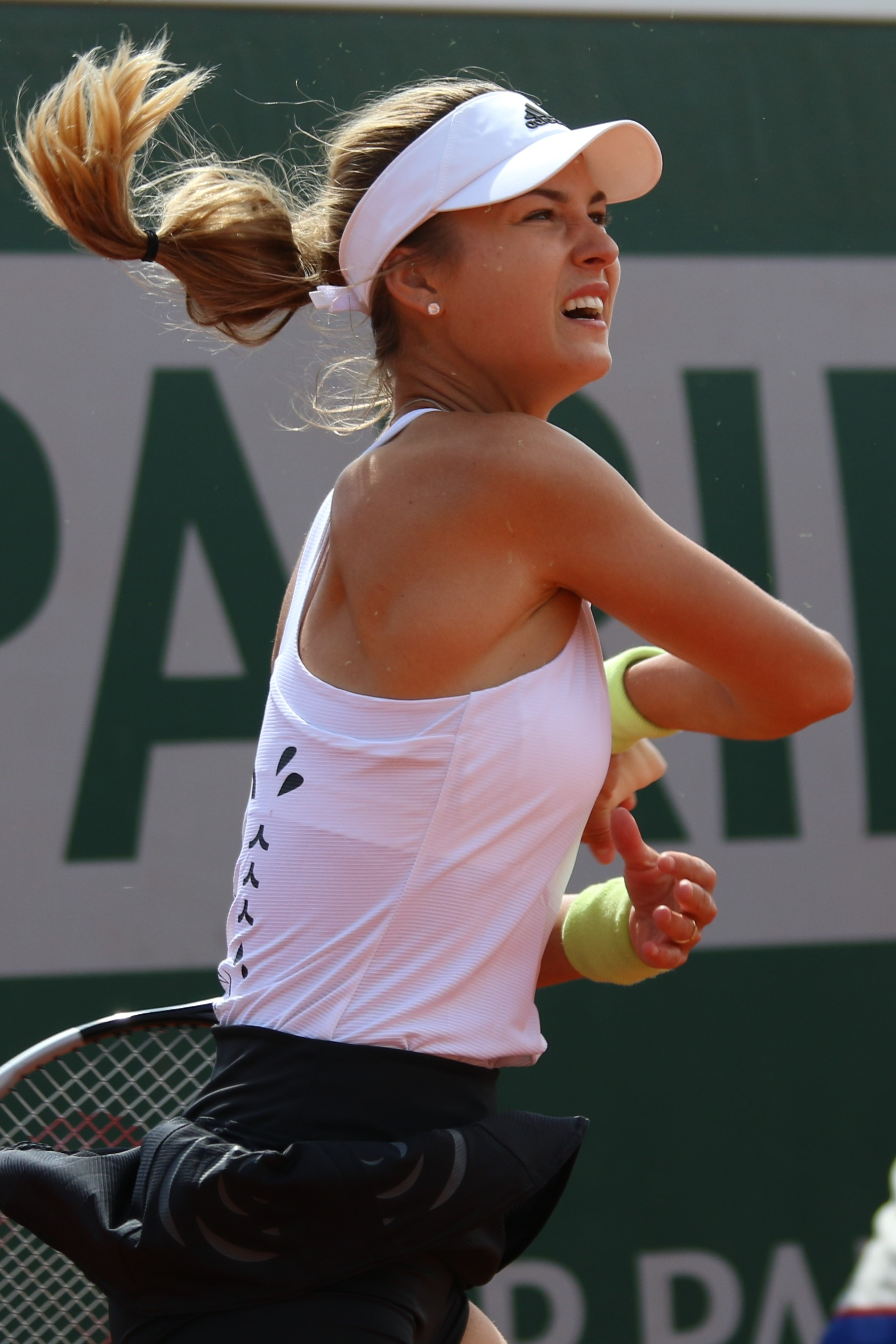
Kalinskaya at the 2022 French Open

==== Singles ====
Kalinskaya started her season by qualifying for the Melbourne Summer Set. In the main draw, she was forced to retire during the second set against her compatriot Daria Kasatkina. As a leading seed at the Australian Open qualifying, she lost in straight sets to Andrea Lázaro García. She continued to struggle at the St. Petersburg Ladies' Trophy where she lost in the final qualifying stage.

At the next three tournaments, Kalinskaya made progress. Ranked at No. 100, she defeated three better-ranked players at the Abierto Zapopan in Guadalajara, Mexico, and reached the semifinals. In the semifinal match against Stephens, she won the first set against the eventual champion, but retired after the second set when her opponent made a turnover. The second good result came at the Indian Wells Open, where she won two qualifying matches and achieved main-draw wins against two French players, Harmony Tan and Alizé Cornet. Despite winning the first set against Romanian Sorana Cîrstea in the third round, she lost another two sets, winning only one game. The same situation happened again at the Miami Open, where she reached the third round after qualifying, but this time she did a walkover before the third-round match against Lucia Bronzetti. Previously, in the second round, she defeated the world's No. 6, Karolína Plíšková, to notch her second top-10 win.

Her first Grand Slam tournament main-draw appearance of the year was at the French Open. Being in the top 100, she secured an automatic place in the main draw, but lost to American Madison Keys. Grass-court season started for her with two second rounds, the (Rosmalen Open, and the German Open). Swiss player Belinda Bencic eliminated her at both. After the Russian invasion of Ukraine, she was suspended for playing at Wimbledon because of the Russian players ban. On 18 July 2022, she reached a career-high singles ranking of No. 70, after losing in the second round of the Ladies Open Lusanne. She lost to Danilović, after having a match point.

Following a second round showing at the US Open, she reached a new career-high ranking of No. 51 on 12 September 2022. At the WTA 1000 Guadalajara Open, she defeated ninth seed Barbora Krejčíková, marking her third top-20 win of the season, She overcame Elise Mertens, and seventh seed Daria Kasatkina, her fourth top-20 win, to reach the quarterfinals for the first time at this level.

==== Doubles ====
The season started well for Kalinskaya when she won the title at St. Petersburg, together with Caty McNally. On 11 July 2022, she reached a new career-high doubles ranking of No. 65. Again with McNally in August, she lost the final of the Washington Open.

=== 2023: Out of top 100, first WTA 125 title ===
In November, ranked No. 115, Kalinskaya won her first Challenger title in the Greater Midland Tennis Center, defeating Croatian player Jana Fett in the final, in straight sets. During her journey to the championship match, Kalinskaya achieved wins over several competitors, Heather Watson and Tatiana Prozorova won both in straight sets, triumphed in a tight match against American Hailey Baptiste ending in 7–6, 4–6, 7–6, saving three match points, and the third-seeded Alycia Parks.

=== 2024: WTA 1000 final & top 15 ===
At the Australian Open, Kalinskaya defeated Katie Volynets, Arantxa Rus and Sloane Stephens to reach the fourth round, having never previously been past the second round of a major. Next, she defeated 26th seed Jasmine Paolini in straight sets to reach the quarterfinals. She lost to 12th seed and eventual runner-up, Zheng Qinwen, in three sets. As a result, she reached the top 50 in the rankings.

At the WTA 1000 Dubai Open, as a qualifier, she defeated Storm Hunter and lucky loser Cristina Bucșa. Next, she defeated three former Grand Slam champions: Jeļena Ostapenko, her fifth top-10 win in three sets, Coco Gauff, her first top-5 win in straight sets, and then upset world No. 1, Iga Świątek, by winning in straight sets in the semifinals. Kalinskaya became only the second qualifier to reach a WTA 1000 final since Caroline Garcia at the 2022 Cincinnati Open. She lost to fellow first-time WTA 1000 finalist Jasmine Paolini in the final, in three sets. As a result, she moved into the top 25 in the rankings on 26 February 2024, at world No. 24.

At the Miami Open, Kalinskaya reached the fourth round defeating Wang Xiyu and then world No. 10, Jelena Ostapenko, her fifth win over a top 10 player (out of five matches vs the top 10 played this season) in a span of only three months since the beginning of the season, becoming only the fourth player this century to achieve this feat while outside of the top 20. She withdrew from the tournament due to injury before her match with eighth seed Maria Sakkari.

Moving on to the clay-court swing, Kalinskaya defeated qualifier Clara Tauson at the Italian Open, before going out in the second round to 16th seed Elina Svitolina. It was a similar story at the French Open, where as 23rd seed she got past home favourite Clara Burel in her opening match but then lost to Bianca Andreescu.

After reaching the final at the Berlin Ladies Open with wins over two Belarusians, second seed and world No. 3, Aryna Sabalenka (by retirement for the first time in her career), and Victoria Azarenka, on the same day, she entered the top 20 in the rankings on 24 June 2024, despite losing the championship match to Jessica Pegula.

At Wimbledon, Kalinskaya had her best ever run at the grass court major, recording wins over Panna Udvardy, Marie Bouzková, and Liudmila Samsonova, before going out in the fourth round when an injury forced her to retire while trailing against fourth seed Elena Rybakina.

At the WTA 1000 Canadian Open, she overcame qualifier Louisa Chirico and Lesia Tsurenko to reach the third round where she retired with an injury, after losing the first set to Amanda Anisimova. A win over Kateřina Siniaková saw Kalinskaya set up a second round meeting with Paula Badosa at the Cincinnati Open, which she lost in straight sets.

Seeded 15th at the US Open, she defeated Lauren Davis and Anna Bondár, before losing to 22nd seed Beatriz Haddad Maia in the third round.

At her next tournament, the WTA 1000 China Open, she was seeded tenth and defeated qualifier Hailey Baptiste in a deciding set tie-break and then benefited from the retirement of Peyton Stearns to reach the round-of-16 where she lost to qualifier Yuliia Starodubtseva in straight sets.

Having reached the second round at the Wuhan Open with a win over Anna Bondár, before losing to Ekaterina Alexandrova Kalinskaya played her final tournament of the 2024 Asian swing at the Ningbo Open. There she defeated lucky loser Priscilla Hon and Yuan Yue to make it through to her fourth WTA Tour quarterfinal of the season. Despite losing in the last eight to Karolína Muchová, Kalinskaya reached a new career-high of world No. 11 on 28 October.

=== 2025: First WTA 1000 doubles title, Washington final ===
Partnering Priscilla Hon, Kalinskaya was runner-up in the doubles at the Brisbane International, losing to Mirra Andreeva and Diana Shnaider in the final. The following week, at the Adelaide International, she retired due to injury while trailing in her first round match against seventh seed Belinda Bencic. Kalinskaya subsequently withdrew from the Australian Open, just minutes before her first-round match against Kimberly Birrell was due to start.

Kalinskaya returned to action as top seed in the Singapore Open, where she recorded wins over Caroline Dolehide, Simona Waltert and Mananchaya Sawangkaew to reach the semifinals. Having lost the first set of her semifinal match against Ann Li in a tiebreak, she retired due to a thigh injury.

In April at the Charleston Open, Kalinskaya defeated qualifier Caty McNally and second seed Madison Keys to reach the quarterfinals, where she lost to Sofia Kenin.

Partnering with Sorana Cîrstea, Kalinskaya won her first WTA 1000 doubles title at the Madrid Open, defeating Veronika Kudermetova and Elise Mertens in the final.

At the Strasbourg Open, wins over qualifier Caroline Dolehide and top seed Jessica Pegula saw her make it through to the quarterfinals, at which point she withdrew due to injury handing her last eight opponent, Danielle Collins, a walkover. Seeded 30th at the French Open, Kalinskaya lost to Marie Bouzková in the first round.

In July, Kalinskaya lost in the second round at Wimbledon to 23rd seed Clara Tauson. Her next event was the Washington Open, where she defeated qualifier Kamilla Rakhimova, eighth seed Magda Linette, fourth seed Clara Tauson and Emma Raducanu to reach the final, which she lost to Leylah Fernandez. The following week at the Canadian Open, Kalinskaya recorded three-set wins over Ann Li and 19th seed Elise Martens to make it through to the third round, at which point she lost to 10th seed Elina Svitolina.

Seeded 28th at the Cincinnati Open, she received a bye in the first round and then defeated Peyton Stearns, fifth seed Amanda Anisimova and 12th seed Ekaterina Alexandrova to reach the quarterfinals. Kalinskaya lost in the last eight to third seed Iga Świątek. Later that month at the US Open, she reached the third round but lost to Świątek again.

In October at the Pan Pacific Open, Kalinskaya defeated lucky loser Suzan Lamens and seventh seed Diana Shnaider to make it into the quarterfinals, at which point her run ended when she retired due to a back injury having lost the opening seven games against sixth seed Linda Nosková. The following week at the Hong Kong Open, wins over Kamilla Rakhimova and Zhang Shuai saw Kalinskaya reach the quarterfinals but at that stage she again retired due to injury while trailing by a set and a break of serve against third seed Victoria Mboko.

=== 2026: French Open quarterfinal ===
In February at the Qatar Ladies Open, Kalinskaya defeated Jéssica Bouzas Maneiro, 12th seed Emma Navarro and seventh seed Elina Svitolina to reach the quarterfinals, at which point she lost to 14th seed Karolína Muchová.

Seeded eighth at the Charleston Open, she received a bye in the first round and then recorded wins over qualifier Viktoriya Tomova and Paula Badosa to make it into the quarterfinals, where she lost to fourth seed Iva Jovic.

At the French Open, Kalinskaya reached the quarterfinals at this major for the first time with a fourth round win over Anastasia Potapova in a deciding third set super-tiebreak. She lost in the last eight to qualifier Maja Chwalińska in straight sets.

Seeded fifth at the Washington Open, she defeated qualifier Daria Kasatkina and Janice Tjen to make it through to the quarterfinals, at which point her run was ended by top seed Jessica Pegula. At the US Open, Kalinskaya overcame ninth seed Elina Svitolina en route to the fourth round, where she lost to 26th Emma Navarro.

== National representation ==
=== Billie Jean King Cup ===
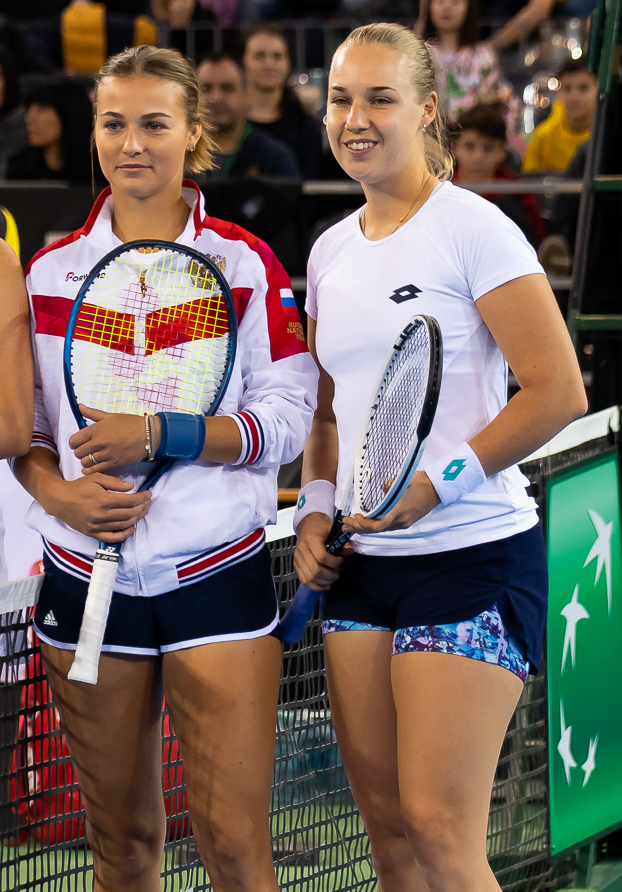
Kalinskaya during the 2020-21 Billie Jean King Cup alongside her doubles partner Anna Blinkova (right) when Russia won the edition.

She received her first Fed Cup nomination for the Russia Fed Cup team in the 2017 Fed Cup World Group II, but was only selected for the dead doubles rubber, which she won with Anna Blinkova.

She made her Fed Cup live rubber debut at the 2018 Fed Cup World Group II, losing to Magdaléna Rybáriková.

Kalinskaya again represented Russia at the 2020 Billie Jean King Cup, helping her country get to the finals by winning the decisive doubles rubber with partner Anna Blinkova.

== Personal life ==
Kalinskaya briefly dated Nick Kyrgios in 2020. She also dated fellow tennis player Jannik Sinner. She has a dog, Bella, an English cream dachshund, who often travels to tournaments with her.

== Career statistics ==
=== Grand Slam tournament performance timeline ===
Key
W	F	SF	QF	#R	RR	Q#	DNQ	A	NH

(W) winner; (F) finalist; (SF) semifinalist; (QF) quarterfinalist; (#R) rounds 4, 3, 2, 1; (RR) round-robin stage; (Q#) qualification round; (DNQ) did not qualify; (A) absent; (NH) not held; (SR) strike rate (events won / competed); (W–L) win–loss record.
To avoid confusion and double counting, these charts are updated at the conclusion of a tournament or when the player's participation has ended.

Only main-draw results in WTA Tour, Grand Slam tournaments, Fed Cup/Billie Jean King Cup, Hopman Cup, United Cup and Olympic Games are included in win–loss records.

==== Singles ====
Current through the 2026 US Open.

Tournament	2016	2017	2018	2019	2020	2021	2022	2023	2024	2025	2026	SR	W–L	Win %
Australian Open	A	Q1	1R	1R	1R	Q2	Q1	1R	QF	A	3R	0 / 6	6–6	50%
French Open	A	Q1	Q3	Q1	1R	Q1	1R	A	2R	1R	QF	0 / 5	5–5	50%
Wimbledon	A	Q1	Q3	1R	NH	1R	A (Note: Suspended due to the ban of Russian and Belarusian athletes in light of the Russian invasion of Ukraine)	A	4R	2R	3R	0 / 5	6–5	55%
US Open	A	Q1	1R	2R	2R	Q2	2R	2R	3R	3R	4R	0 / 8	11–8	58%
Win–Loss	0–0	0–0	0–2	1–3	1–3	0–1	1–2	1–2	10–4	3–3	11–4	0 / 24	28–24	54%

==== Doubles ====
Current through the 2026 WTA Tour.

Tournament	2016	2017	2018	2019	2020	2021	2022	2023	2024	2025	2026	SR	W–L	Win %
Australian Open	A	A	A	A	1R	3R	A	QF	3R	A	1R	0 / 5	7–5	58%
French Open	A	A	1R	A	1R	1R	2R	A	2R	A	A	0 / 5	2–5	29%
Wimbledon	A	A	Q2	A	NH	2R (Note: Withdrew during the tournament. Not counted as a loss.)	A	A	A	QF	A	0 / 2	4–1	80%
US Open	A	A	A	3R	A	1R	1R	1R	2R	1R	A	0 / 6	3–6	33%
Win–Loss	0–0	0–0	0–1	2–1	0–2	3–3	1–2	3–2	4–3	3–2	0–1	0 / 18	16–17	48%

=== WTA 1000 tournaments ===
==== Singles: 1 (runner-up) ====
Result	Year	Tournament	Surface	Opponent	Score
Loss	2024	Dubai Championships	Hard	(Italy) Jasmine Paolini	6–4, 5–7, 5–7

==== Doubles: 1 (title) ====
Result	Year	Tournament	Surface	Partner	Opponents	Score
Win	2025	Madrid Open	Clay	(Romania) Sorana Cîrstea	(Russia) Veronika Kudermetova (Belgium) Elise Mertens	6–7^{(10–12)}, 6–2, [12–10]
