= Simona Halep career statistics =

Career finals
Discipline	Type	Won	Lost	Total	WR
Singles	Grand Slam	2	3	5	0.4
Singles	WTA Finals (Note: Formerly known as WTA Tour Championships until 2014.)	0	1	1	0.00
Singles	WTA 1000	9	9	18	0.50
Singles	WTA Tour	13	5	18	0.72
Singles	Olympics	–	–	–	–
Singles	Total	24	18	42	0.57
Doubles	Grand Slam	–	–	–	–
Doubles	WTA Finals	–	–	–	–
Doubles	WTA 1000	0	1	1	0.00
Doubles	WTA Tour	1	0	1	1.00
Doubles	Olympics	–	–	–	–
Doubles	Total	1	1	2	0.50

This is a list of the main career statistics of professional Romanian tennis player Simona Halep.

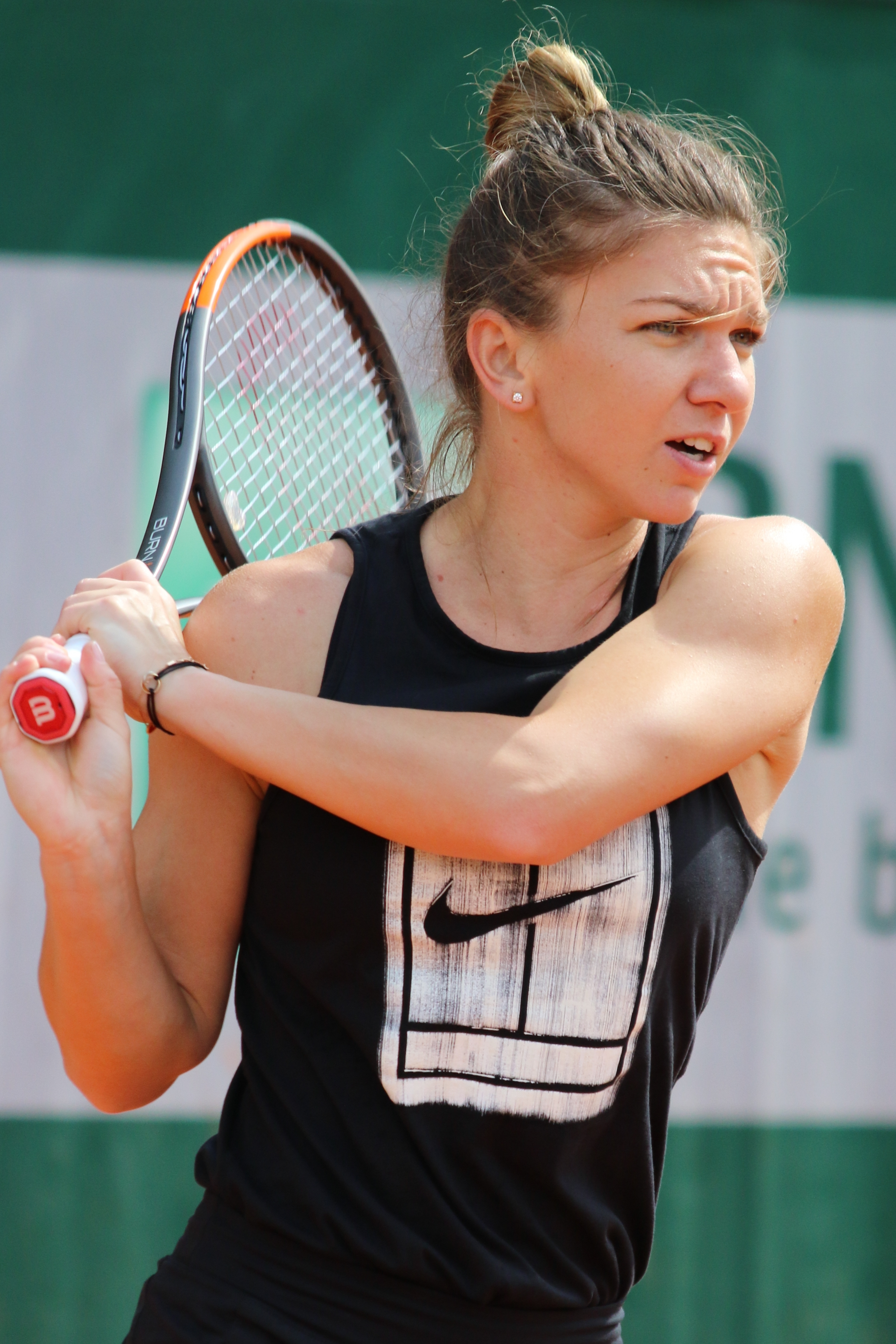
Halep at the 2018 French Open

== Performance timelines ==
Key
W	F	SF	QF	#R	RR	Q#	P#	DNQ	A	Z#	PO	G	S	B	NMS	NTI	P	NH

(W) winner; (F) finalist; (SF) semifinalist; (QF) quarterfinalist; (#R) rounds 4, 3, 2, 1; (RR) round-robin stage; (Q#) qualification round; (P#) preliminary round; (DNQ) did not qualify; (A) absent; (Z#) Davis/Fed Cup Zonal Group (with number indication) or (PO) play-off; (G) gold, (S) silver or (B) bronze Olympic/Paralympic medal; (NMS) not a Masters tournament; (NTI) not a Tier I tournament; (P) postponed; (NH) not held; (SR) strike rate (events won / competed); (W–L) win–loss record.
To avoid confusion and double counting, these charts are updated at the conclusion of a tournament or when the player's participation has ended.

Only main-draw results in WTA Tour, Grand Slam tournaments, Fed Cup/Billie Jean King Cup and Olympic Games are included in win–loss records.

=== Singles ===
Tournament	2010	2011	2012	2013	2014	2015	2016	2017	2018	2019	2020	2021	2022	2023	2024	2025	SR	W–L	Win %
Grand Slam tournaments
Australian Open	Q1	3R	1R	1R	QF	QF	1R	1R	F	4R	SF	QF	4R	A	A	A	0 / 12	31–12	72%
French Open	1R	2R	1R	1R	F	2R	4R	F	W	QF	4R	A	2R	A	A	A	1 / 12	32–11	74%
Wimbledon	Q2	2R	1R	2R	SF	1R	QF	QF	3R	W	NH	A	SF	A	A	A	1 / 10	29–9	76%
US Open	1R	2R	2R	4R	3R	SF	QF	1R	1R	2R	A	4R	1R	A	A	A	0 / 12	20–12	63%
Win–loss	0–2	5–4	1–4	4–4	17–4	10–4	11–4	10–4	15–3	15–3	8–2	7–2	9–4	0–0	0–0	0–0	2 / 46	112–44	72%
Year-end championships
WTA Finals	DNQ				F	RR	RR	RR	A	RR	NH	DNQ	A	DNQ			0 / 5	7–10	41%
WTA Elite Trophy (Note: WTA Tournament of Champions was held from 2009 to 2014, when WTA Elite Trophy replaced it.)	DNQ			W	DNQ						NH			DNQ	NH		1 / 1	5–0	100%
National representation
Summer Olympics	NH		1R	NH			A	NH				A	NH		A	NH	0 / 1	0–1	0%
Billie Jean King Cup (Note: Formerly known as Fed Cup until 2020.)	PO	A	PO	A	WG2	PO	QF	PO	PO	SF	A (Note: Edition is split into the two years due to COVID-19.)		A	A	A	A	0 / 8	20–5	80%
WTA 1000
Dubai / Qatar Open (Note: The first Premier 5 event of the year has switched back and forth between the Dubai Championships and the Qatar Total Open since 2009. Dubai was classified as a Premier 5 event from 2009 to 2011 before being succeeded by Doha for the 2012–2014 period. The two tournaments have since alternated status every year. The Premier 5 tournaments were reclassified as WTA 1000 tournaments in 2021. In 2024 and 2025, both tournaments were WTA 1000 events.)	A	A	3R	2R	W	W	2R	A	SF (Note: The withdrawal of Halep before her semifinal match against Garbiñe Muguruza does not count as a loss.)	QF	A	A	1R	A	A	A	2 / 8	18–5	78%
Indian Wells Open	A	2R	3R	2R	SF	W	QF	3R	SF	4R	NH	3R	SF	A	A	A	1 / 11	28–10	74%
Miami Open	A	2R	3R	3R	A	SF	QF	QF	3R	SF	NH	3R (Note: Withdraw during the tournament. Not counted as a loss.)	A	A	1R	A	0 / 10	21–9	70%
Madrid Open	Q1	1R	1R	1R	F	1R	W	W	QF	F	NH	3R	QF	A	A	A	2 / 11	30–9	77%
Italian Open	A	Q1	1R	SF	3R (Note: The withdrawal of Halep before her third-round match against Carla Suárez Navarro does not count as a loss.)	SF	2R	F	F	2R	W	2R	2R	A	A	A	1 / 11	21–9	70%
Canadian Open	Q3	2R	2R	A	A	F	W	SF	W	QF	NH	2R	W	A	A	A	3 / 9	27–6	82%
Cincinnati Open	Q2	A	1R	QF	QF	F	SF	F	F	3R	A	2R	2R	A	A	A	0 / 10	23–8	74%
Pan Pac. / Wuhan Open (Note: In 2014, the Pan Pacific Open was downgraded to a Premier event and replaced by the Wuhan Open. The Premier 5 tournaments were reclassified as WTA 1000 tournaments in 2021.)	Q2	A	2R	3R	2R	3R	SF	2R	2R	3R	NH				A	A	0 / 8	8–8	50%
China Open	A	A	1R	1R	QF (Note: The withdrawal of Halep before her quarterfinal match against Ana Ivanovic does not count as loss.)	1R	3R	F	1R	2R	NH			A	A	A	0 / 8	10–7	59%
Career statistics
	2010	2011	2012	2013	2014	2015	2016	2017	2018	2019	2020	2021	2022	2023	2024	2025	SR	W–L	Win %
Tournaments	9	22	24	23	19	18	18	18	15	17	6	13	15	0	2	1	Career total: 220		
Titles	0	0	0	6	2	3	3	1	3	1	3	0	2	0	0	0	Career total: 24		
Finals	1	1	1	6	5	5	3	5	6	3	3	1	2	0	0	0	Career total: 42		
Hard win–loss	0–3	10–12	14–15	28–11	23–11	41–11	26–13	21–12	28–7	23–13	10–2	20–7	23–6	0–0	0–2	0–1	13 / 139	267–126	68%
Clay win–loss	7–6	5–8	9–6	16–5	17–3	6–4	15–4	18–3	16–3	11–3	13–1	4–3	5–3	0–0	0–0	0–0	9 / 61	142–52	73%
Grass win–loss	0–0	1–2	0–3	6–1	6–2	2–2	4–1	6–2	2–1	9–1	0–0	0–0	11–2	0–0	0–0	0–0	2 / 20	47–17	73%
Overall win–loss	7–9	16–22	23–24	50–17	46–16	49–17	45–18	45–17	46–11	43–17	23–3	24–10	39–11	0–0	0–2	0–1	24 / 220	456–195	70%
Win (%)	44%	42%	49%	75%	74%	74%	71%	73%	81%	72%	88%	71%	78%	–	0%	0%	Career total: 70%		
Year-end ranking (Note: 2008: WTA ranking–352, 2009: WTA ranking–210.)	81	53	47	11	3	2	4	1	1	4	2	20	10	–	882	–	$40,236,618		

=== Doubles ===
Tournament	2011	2012	2013	2014	2015	2016	2017	2018	2019	2020	2021	2022	2023	SR	W–L	Win %
Grand Slam tournaments
Australian Open	1R	1R	1R	1R	A	A	A	A	A	A	1R	1R	A	0 / 6	0–6	0%
French Open	1R	2R	1R	A	A	A	A	A	A	A	A	A	A	0 / 3	1–2	33%
Wimbledon	1R	1R	1R	A	1R	A	A	A	A	NH	A	A	A	0 / 4	0–4	0%
US Open	2R	1R	1R	A	A	A	A	A	A	A	A	A	A	0 / 3	1–3	25%
Win–loss	1–4	1–3	0–4	0–1	0–1	0–0	0–0	0–0	0–0	0–0	0–1	0–1	0–0	0 / 16	2–15	12%
National representation
Summer Olympics	NH	1R	NH			A	NH				A	NH		0 / 1	0–1	0%
WTA 1000
Dubai / Qatar Open	A	A	1R	A	A	1R	A	A	A	A	A	A	A	0 / 2	0–2	0%
Indian Wells Open	A	A	A	A	A	A	A	A	1R	A	NH	2R	A	0 / 2	1–2	33%
Miami Open	A	A	A	A	1R	A	A	2R	2R	NH	2R	A	A	0 / 3	3–3	50%
Madrid Open	1R	A	A	A	A	A	SF	1R	2R	NH	A	A	A	0 / 4	4–4	50%
Italian Open	A	A	A	A	2R	A	A	A	A	2R	A	A	A	0 / 2	2–2	50%
Canadian Open	A	A	A	A	1R	F	A	1R	1R	NH	A	A	A	0 / 4	4–4	50%
Pan Pac. / Wuhan Open	A	A	A	A	A	1R	A	A	2R	NH				0 / 2	1–1	50%
China Open	A	A	A	2R	A	A	A	A	A	NH			A	0 / 1	1–1	50%
Career statistics
Tournaments	7	8	7	3	6	3	3	5	5	4	3	2	0	Career total: 56		
Titles	0	0	0	0	0	0	0	1	0	0	0	0	0	Career total: 1		
Finals	0	0	0	0	0	1	0	1	0	0	0	0	0	Career total: 2		
Overall win–loss	3–7	5–7	1–7	1–2	2–5	4–3	4–3	5–4	5–5	1–4	3–2	0–2	0–0	1 / 56	34–51	40%
Win (%)	30%	42%	13%	33%	29%	57%	57%	56%	50%	20%	60%	0%	–	Career total: 40%		
Year-end ranking	197	221	484	497	301	125	148	165	146	133	292	1250	–			

=== Grand Slam tournament finals ===
==== Singles: 5 (2 titles, 3 runner-ups) ====
Result	Year	Championship	Surface	Opponent	Score
Loss	2014	French Open	Clay	(Russia) Maria Sharapova	4–6, 7–6^{(7–5)}, 4–6
Loss	2017	French Open	Clay	(Latvia) Jeļena Ostapenko	6–4, 4–6, 3–6
Loss	2018	Australian Open	Hard	(Denmark) Caroline Wozniacki	6–7^{(2–7)}, 6–3, 4–6
Win	2018	French Open	Clay	(United States) Sloane Stephens	3–6, 6–4, 6–1
Win	2019	Wimbledon	Grass	(United States) Serena Williams	6–2, 6–2

== Other significant finals ==
=== Year-end championships finals ===
==== Singles: 1 (runner-up) ====
Result	Year	Tournament	Surface	Opponent	Score
Loss	2014	WTA Finals, Singapore	Hard (i)	(United States) Serena Williams	3–6, 0–6

=== WTA 1000 finals ===
==== Singles: 18 (9 titles, 9 runner-ups) ====
Result	Year	Tournament	Surface	Opponent	Score
Win	2014	Qatar Ladies Open	Hard	(Germany) Angelique Kerber	6–2, 6–3
Loss	2014	Madrid Open	Clay	(Russia) Maria Sharapova	6–1, 2–6, 3–6
Win	2015	Dubai Championships	Hard	(Czech Republic) Karolína Plíšková	6–4, 7–6^{(7–4)}
Win	2015	Indian Wells Open	Hard	(Serbia) Jelena Janković	2–6, 7–5, 6–4
Loss	2015	Canadian Open	Hard	(Switzerland) Belinda Bencic	6–7^{(5–7)}, 7–6^{(7–4)}, 0–3 (ret.)
Loss	2015	Cincinnati Open	Hard	(United States) Serena Williams	3–6, 6–7^{(5–7)}
Win	2016	Madrid Open	Clay	(Slovakia) Dominika Cibulková	6–2, 6–4
Win	2016	Canadian Open	Hard	(United States) Madison Keys	7–6^{(7–2)}, 6–3
Win	2017	Madrid Open (2)	Clay	(France) Kristina Mladenovic	7–5, 6–7^{(5–7)}, 6–2
Loss	2017	Italian Open	Clay	(Ukraine) Elina Svitolina	6–4, 5–7, 1–6
Loss	2017	Cincinnati Open	Hard	(Spain) Garbiñe Muguruza	1–6, 0–6
Loss	2017	China Open	Hard	(France) Caroline Garcia	4–6, 6–7^{(3–7)}
Loss	2018	Italian Open	Clay	(Ukraine) Elina Svitolina	0–6, 4–6
Win	2018	Canadian Open (2)	Hard	(United States) Sloane Stephens	7–6^{(8–6)}, 3–6, 6–4
Loss	2018	Cincinnati Open	Hard	(Netherlands) Kiki Bertens	6–2, 6–7^{(6–8)}, 2–6
Loss	2019	Madrid Open	Clay	(Netherlands) Kiki Bertens	4–6, 4–6
Win	2020	Italian Open	Clay	(Czech Republic) Karolína Plíšková	6–0, 2–1 (ret.)
Win	2022	Canadian Open (3)	Hard	(Brazil) Beatriz Haddad Maia	6–3, 2–6, 6–3

==== Doubles: 1 (runner-up) ====
Result	Year	Tournament	Surface	Partner	Opponents	Score
Loss	2016	Canadian Open	Hard	(Romania) Monica Niculescu	(Russia) Ekaterina Makarova (Russia) Elena Vesnina	3–6, 6–7^{(5–7)}

== WTA Tour finals ==
=== Singles: 42 (24 titles, 18 runner-ups) ===
Legend Grand Slam (2–3) WTA Finals (0–1) WTA Finals (1–0) WTA 1000 (9–9) WTA 500 (3–2) WTA 250 (9–3)	Finals by surface Hard (13–9) Grass (2–0) Clay (9–9)

Result	W–L	Date	Tournament	Tier	Surface	Opponent	Score
Loss	0–1	May 2010	Morocco Open, Morocco	International (Note: The WTA International tournaments were reclassified as WTA 250 tournaments in 2021.)	Clay	(Czech Republic) Iveta Benešová	4–6, 2–6
Loss	0–2	Apr 2011	Morocco Open, Morocco	International	Clay	(Italy) Alberta Brianti	4–6, 3–6
Loss	0–3	May 2012	Brussels Open, Belgium	Premier (Note: The WTA Premier tournaments were reclassified as WTA 500 tournaments in 2021.)	Clay	(Poland) Agnieszka Radwańska	5–7, 0–6
Win	1–3	Jun 2013	Nuremberg Cup, Germany	International	Clay	(Germany) Andrea Petkovic	6–3, 6–3
Win	2–3	Jun 2013	Rosmalen Open, Netherlands	International	Grass	(Belgium) Kirsten Flipkens	6–4, 6–2
Win	3–3	Jul 2013	Budapest Grand Prix, Hungary	International	Clay	(Austria) Yvonne Meusburger	6–3, 6–7^{(7–9)}, 6–1
Win	4–3	Aug 2013	Connecticut Open, United States	Premier	Hard	(Czech Republic) Petra Kvitová	6–2, 6–2
Win	5–3	Oct 2013	Kremlin Cup, Russia	Premier	Hard (i)	(Australia) Samantha Stosur	7–6^{(7–1)}, 6–2
Win	6–3	Nov 2013	WTA Tournament of Champions, Bulgaria	Elite	Hard (i)	(Australia) Samantha Stosur	2–6, 6–2, 6–2
Win	7–3	Feb 2014	Qatar Open, Qatar	Premier 5 (Note: The WTA Premier 5 & Mandatory tournaments were reclassified as WTA 1000 tournaments in 2021.)	Hard	(Germany) Angelique Kerber	6–2, 6–3
Loss	7–4	May 2014	Madrid Open, Spain	Premier M	Clay	(Russia) Maria Sharapova	6–1, 2–6, 3–6
Loss	7–5	Jun 2014	French Open, France	Grand Slam	Clay	(Russia) Maria Sharapova	4–6, 7–6^{(7–5)}, 4–6
Win	8–5	Jul 2014	Bucharest Open, Romania	International	Clay	(Italy) Roberta Vinci	6–1, 6–3
Loss	8–6	Oct 2014	WTA Finals, Singapore	WTA Finals	Hard (i)	(United States) Serena Williams	3–6, 0–6
Win	9–6	Jan 2015	Shenzhen Open, China	International	Hard	(Switzerland) Timea Bacsinszky	6–2, 6–2
Win	10–6	Feb 2015	Dubai Championships, UAE	Premier 5	Hard	(Czech Republic) Karolína Plíšková	6–4, 7–6^{(7–4)}
Win	11–6	Mar 2015	Indian Wells Open, United States	Premier M	Hard	(Serbia) Jelena Janković	2–6, 7–5, 6–4
Loss	11–7	Aug 2015	Canadian Open, Canada	Premier 5	Hard	(Switzerland) Belinda Bencic	6–7^{(5–7)}, 7–6^{(7–4)}, 0–3 ret.
Loss	11–8	Aug 2015	Cincinnati Open, United States	Premier 5	Hard	(United States) Serena Williams	3–6, 6–7^{(5–7)}
Win	12–8	May 2016	Madrid Open, Spain	Premier M	Clay	(Slovakia) Dominika Cibulková	6–2, 6–4
Win	13–8	Jul 2016	Bucharest Open, Romania (2)	International	Clay	(Latvia) Anastasija Sevastova	6–0, 6–0
Win	14–8	Jul 2016	Canadian Open, Canada	Premier 5	Hard	(United States) Madison Keys	7–6^{(7–2)}, 6–3
Win	15–8	May 2017	Madrid Open, Spain (2)	Premier M	Clay	(France) Kristina Mladenovic	7–5, 6–7^{(5–7)}, 6–2
Loss	15–9	May 2017	Italian Open, Italy	Premier 5	Clay	(Ukraine) Elina Svitolina	6–4, 5–7, 1–6
Loss	15–10	Jun 2017	French Open, France	Grand Slam	Clay	(Latvia) Jeļena Ostapenko	6–4, 4–6, 3–6
Loss	15–11	Aug 2017	Cincinnati Open, United States	Premier 5	Hard	(Spain) Garbiñe Muguruza	1–6, 0–6
Loss	15–12	Oct 2017	China Open, China	Premier M	Hard	(France) Caroline Garcia	4–6, 6–7^{(3–7)}
Win	16–12	Jan 2018	Shenzhen Open, China (2)	International	Hard	(Czech Republic) Kateřina Siniaková	6–1, 2–6, 6–0
Loss	16–13	Jan 2018	Australian Open, Australia	Grand Slam	Hard	(Denmark) Caroline Wozniacki	6–7^{(2–7)}, 6–3, 4–6
Loss	16–14	May 2018	Italian Open, Italy	Premier 5	Clay	(Ukraine) Elina Svitolina	0–6, 4–6
Win	17–14	Jun 2018	French Open, France	Grand Slam	Clay	(United States) Sloane Stephens	3–6, 6–4, 6–1
Win	18–14	Aug 2018	Canadian Open, Canada (2)	Premier 5	Hard	(United States) Sloane Stephens	7–6^{(8–6)}, 3–6, 6–4
Loss	18–15	Aug 2018	Cincinnati Open, United States	Premier 5	Hard	(Netherlands) Kiki Bertens	6–2, 6–7^{(6–8)}, 2–6
Loss	18–16	Feb 2019	Qatar Open, Qatar	Premier	Hard	(Belgium) Elise Mertens	6–3, 4–6, 3–6
Loss	18–17	May 2019	Madrid Open, Spain	Premier M	Clay	(Netherlands) Kiki Bertens	4–6, 4–6
Win	19–17	Jul 2019	Wimbledon, United Kingdom	Grand Slam	Grass	(United States) Serena Williams	6–2, 6–2
Win	20–17	Feb 2020	Dubai Championships, UAE (2)	Premier	Hard	(Kazakhstan) Elena Rybakina	3–6, 6–3, 7–6^{(7–5)}
Win	21–17	Aug 2020	Prague Open, Czech Republic	International	Clay	(Belgium) Elise Mertens	6–2, 7–5
Win	22–17	Sep 2020	Italian Open, Italy	Premier 5	Clay	(Czech Republic) Karolína Plíšková	6–0, 2–1 ret.
Loss	22–18	Oct 2021	Transylvania Open, Romania	WTA 250	Hard (i)	(Estonia) Anett Kontaveit	2–6, 3–6
Win	23–18	Jan 2022	Melbourne Summer Set, Australia	WTA 250	Hard	(Russia) Veronika Kudermetova	6–2, 6–3
Win	24–18	Aug 2022	Canadian Open, Canada (3)	WTA 1000	Hard	(Brazil) Beatriz Haddad Maia	6–3, 2–6, 6–3

=== Doubles: 2 (1 title, 1 runner-up) ===
Legend Grand Slam WTA 1000 (0–1) WTA 500 (0–0) WTA 250 (1–0)	Finals by surface Hard (1–1) Grass (0–0) Clay (0–0)

Result	W–L	Date	Tournament	Tier	Surface	Partner	Opponents	Score
Loss	0–1	Jul 2016	Canadian Open, Canada	Premier 5	Hard	(Romania) Monica Niculescu	(Russia) Elena Vesnina; (Russia) Ekaterina Makarova	3–6, 6–7^{(5–7)}
Win	1–1	Jan 2018	Shenzhen Open, China	International	Hard	(Romania) Irina-Camelia Begu	(Czech Republic) Kateřina Siniaková; (Czech Republic) Barbora Krejčíková	1–6, 6–1, [10–8]

== ITF Circuit finals ==
=== Singles: 8 (6 titles, 2 runner-ups) ===
Legend $100,000 tournaments (0–1) $50,000 tournaments (0–1) $25,000 tournaments (2–0) $10,000 tournaments (4–0)	Finals by surface Hard (0–1) Clay (6–1)

Result	W–L	Date	Tournament	Tier	Surface	Opponent	Score
Win	1–0	May 2007	ITF Bucharest, Romania	10,000	Clay	(Romania) Cristina Mitu	7–6^{(7–5)}, 6–0
Win	2–0	May 2007	ITF Bucharest, Romania	10,000	Clay	(Austria) Patricia Mayr	6–3, 3–6, 6–2
Win	3–0	May 2008	ITF Bucharest, Romania	10,000	Clay	(Romania) Elena Bogdan	6–1, 6–3
Win	4–0	May 2008	ITF Bucharest, Romania	10,000	Clay	(France) Stéphanie Vongsouthi	7–6^{(7–4)}, 6–3
Win	5–0	Jun 2008	ITF Kristinehamn, Sweden	25,000	Clay	(Germany) Anne Schäfer	6–3, 6–2
Loss	5–1	May 2009	ITF Makarska, Croatia	50,000	Clay	(Germany) Tatjana Malek	1–6, 6–4, 4–6
Win	6–1	Sep 2009	ITF Maribor, Slovenia	25,000	Clay	(Hungary) Katalin Marosi	6–4, 6–2
Loss	6–2	Oct 2010	ITF Torhout, Belgium	100,000	Hard	(Belgium) Yanina Wickmayer	3–6, 2–6

=== Doubles: 4 (4 titles) ===
Legend $10,000 tournaments (4–0)	Finals by surface Clay (4–0)

Result	W–L	Date	Tournament	Tier	Surface	Partner	Opponents	Score
Win	1–0	May 2007	ITF Bucharest, Romania	10,000	Clay	(Romania) Ionela-Andreea Iova	(Romania) Laura-Ioana Andrei; (Romania) Ioana Gaspar	6–4, 2–6, 6–3
Win	2–0	May 2007	ITF Bucharest, Romania	10,000	Clay	(Romania) Irina-Camelia Begu	(Romania) Laura-Ioana Andrei; (Romania) Ioana Gaspar	6–4, 6–2
Win	3–0	May 2008	ITF Bucharest, Romania	10,000	Clay	(Romania) Ionela-Andreea Iova	(Ukraine) Oksana Khomyk (New Zealand) Shona Lee	6–3, 6–1
Win	4–0	May 2009	ITF Bucharest, Romania	10,000	Clay	(Romania) Irina-Camelia Begu	(Germany) Julia Görges; (Austria) Sandra Klemenschits	2–6, 6–1, [12–10]

== WTA Tour career earnings ==
Current after the 2022 US Open.

Year	Grand Slam singles titles	WTA singles titles	Total singles titles	Earnings ($)	Money list rank
2009	0	0	0	29,816	n/a
2010	0	0	0	124,957	n/a
2011	0	0	0	282,858	66
2012	0	0	0	374,695	58
2013	0	6	6	1,222,446	18
2014	0	2	2	4,519,763	4
2015	0	3	3	4,568,127	2
2016	0	3	3	4,333,253	3
2017	0	1	1	5,275,227	3
2018	1	2	3	7,409,564	1
2019	1	0	1	6,962,442	2
2020	0	3	3	1,937,890	6
2021	0	0	0	904,330	35
2022	0	2	2	2,253,197	7
Career	2	22	24	40,203,437	3

== Career Grand Slam statistics ==
=== Seedings ===
The tournaments won by Halep are in boldface, and advanced into finals by Halep are in italics.

Legend seeded No. 1 (**1** / 6) seeded No. 2 (0 / 6) seeded No. 3 (0 / 6) seeded No. 4–10 (**1** / 9) seeded No. 11–32 (0 / 6) unseeded (0 / 13)	Longest streak 5 2 3 4 4 12

Year	Australian Open	French Open	Wimbledon	US Open
2009	did not play	did not qualify	did not play	did not play
2010	did not qualify	qualifier	did not qualify	not seeded
2011	not seeded	not seeded	not seeded	not seeded
2012	not seeded	not seeded	not seeded	not seeded
2013	not seeded	not seeded	not seeded	21st
2014	11th	4th (1)	3rd	2nd
2015	3rd	3rd	3rd	2nd
2016	2nd	6th	5th	5th
2017	4th	3rd (2)	2nd	2nd
2018	1st (3)	**1st (1)**	1st	1st
2019	1st	3rd	**7th (2)**	4th
2020	4th	1st	cancelled	did not play
2021	2nd	did not play	did not play	12th
2022	14th	19th	16th	7th

=== Best Grand Slam tournament results details ===
Grand Slam winners are in boldface, and runner–ups are in italics.

Australian Open
2018 Australian Open (1st seed)
Round	Opponent	Rank	Score
1R	(Australia) Destanee Aiava (WC)	193	7–6^{(7–5)}, 6–1
2R	(Canada) Eugenie Bouchard	112	6–2, 6–2
3R	(United States) Lauren Davis	76	4–6, 6–4, 15–13
4R	(Japan) Naomi Osaka	72	6–3, 6–2
QF	(Czech Republic) Karolína Plíšková (6)	6	6–3, 6–2
SF	(Germany) Angelique Kerber (21)	16	6–3, 4–6, 9–7
F	(Denmark) **Caroline Wozniacki** **(2)**	2	6–7^{(2–7)}, 6–3, 4–6

Wimbledon Championships
2019 Wimbledon (7th seed)
Round	Opponent	Rank	Score
1R	(Belarus) Aliaksandra Sasnovich	36	6–4, 7–5
2R	(Romania) Mihaela Buzărnescu	53	6–3, 4–6, 6–2
3R	(Belarus) Victoria Azarenka	40	6–3, 6–1
4R	(United States) Coco Gauff (Q)	313	6–3, 6–3
QF	(China) Zhang Shuai	50	7–6^{(7–4)}, 6–1
SF	(Ukraine) Elina Svitolina (8)	8	6–1, 6–3
**W**	(United States) Serena Williams (11)	10	6–2, 6–2

French Open
2018 French Open (1st seed)
Round	Opponent	Rank	Score
1R	(United States) Alison Riske	83	2–6, 6–1, 6–1
2R	(United States) Taylor Townsend (WC)	72	6–3, 6–1
3R	(Germany) Andrea Petkovic	107	7–5, 6–0
4R	(Belgium) Elise Mertens (16)	16	6–2, 6–1
QF	(Germany) Angelique Kerber (12)	12	6–7^{(2–7)}, 6–3, 6–2
SF	(Spain) Garbiñe Muguruza (3)	3	6–1, 6–4
**W**	(United States) Sloane Stephens (10)	10	3–6, 6–4, 6–1

US Open
2015 US Open (2nd seed)
Round	Opponent	Rank	Score
1R	(New Zealand) Marina Erakovic	99	6–2, 3–0 ret.
2R	(Ukraine) Kateryna Bondarenko (Q)	104	6–3, 6–4
3R	(United States) Shelby Rogers (Q)	154	6–2, 6–3
4R	(Germany) Sabine Lisicki (24)	24	6–7^{(6–8)}, 7–5, 6–2
QF	(Belarus) Victoria Azarenka (20)	20	6–3, 4–6, 6–4
SF	(Italy) **Flavia Pennetta** (26)	26	1–6, 3–6

== Record against other players ==
=== No. 1 wins ===
No.	Player	Event	Surface	Rd	Score	Result
1.	(United States) Serena Williams	2014 WTA Finals, Singapore	Hard	RR	6–0, 6–2	F

=== Top 10 wins ===
Season	2011	2012	2013	2014	2015	2016	2017	2018	2019	2020	2021	2022	2023	2024	Total
Wins	1	0	4	8	3	6	6	6	6	1	0	4	0	0	45

#	Player	Rank	Event	Surface	Rd	Score	SHR
2011
1.	(China) Li Na	No. 6	US Open, United States	Hard	1R	6–2, 7–5	No. 40
2013
2.	(Poland) Agnieszka Radwańska	No. 4	Italian Open, Italy	Clay	2R	6–7^{(2–7)}, 6–1, 6–2	No. 64
3.	(France) Marion Bartoli	No. 7	Cincinnati Open, U.S.	Hard	2R	3–6, 6–4, 6–1	No. 25
4.	(Denmark) Caroline Wozniacki	No. 8	Connecticut Open, U.S.	Hard	SF	6–2, 7–5	No. 25
5.	(Czech Republic) Petra Kvitová	No. 9	Connecticut Open, U.S.	Hard	F	6–2, 6–2	No. 25
2014
6.	(Serbia) Jelena Janković	No. 8	Australian Open, Australia	Hard	4R	6–4, 2–6, 6–0	No. 11
7.	(Italy) Sara Errani	No. 7	Qatar Open, Qatar	Hard	QF	6–2, 6–0	No. 10
8.	(Poland) Agnieszka Radwańska	No. 4	Qatar Open, Qatar	Hard	SF	7–5, 6–2	No. 10
9.	(Germany) Angelique Kerber	No. 9	Qatar Open, Qatar	Hard	F	6–2, 6–3	No. 10
10.	(Czech Republic) Petra Kvitová	No. 6	Madrid Open, Spain	Clay	SF	6–7^{(4–7)}, 6–3, 6–2	No. 5
11.	(Canada) Eugenie Bouchard	No. 5	WTA Finals, Singapore	Hard (i)	RR	6–2, 6–3	No. 4
12.	(United States) Serena Williams	No. 1	WTA Finals, Singapore	Hard (i)	RR	6–0, 6–2	No. 4
13.	(Poland) Agnieszka Radwańska	No. 6	WTA Finals, Singapore	Hard (i)	SF	6–2, 6–2	No. 4
2015
14.	(Russia) Ekaterina Makarova	No. 9	Dubai Championships, UAE	Hard	QF	6–3, 1–6, 7–5	No. 3
15.	(Denmark) Caroline Wozniacki	No. 5	Dubai Championships, UAE	Hard	SF	2–6, 6–1, 6–1	No. 3
16.	(Italy) Flavia Pennetta	No. 8	WTA Finals, Singapore	Hard (i)	RR	6–0, 6–3	No. 2
2016
17.	(Czech Republic) Petra Kvitová	No. 9	Fed Cup, Romania	Hard (i)	QF	6–4, 3–6, 6–3	No. 3
18.	(United States) Madison Keys	No. 9	Wimbledon, UK	Grass	4R	6–7^{(5–7)}, 6–4, 6–3	No. 5
19.	(Germany) Angelique Kerber	No. 2	Canadian Open, Canada	Hard	SF	6–0, 3–6, 6–2	No. 5
20.	(Poland) Agnieszka Radwańska	No. 5	Cincinnati Open, US	Hard	QF	7–5, 6–1	No. 4
21.	(United States) Madison Keys	No. 9	Wuhan Open, China	Hard	QF	6–4, 6–2	No. 5
22.	(United States) Madison Keys	No. 7	WTA Finals, Singapore	Hard (i)	RR	6–2, 6–4	No. 4
2017
23.	(United Kingdom) Johanna Konta	No. 7	Fed Cup, Romania	Clay	WG2 P-O	6–1, 6–3	No. 4
24.	(Ukraine) Elina Svitolina	No. 6	French Open, France	Clay	QF	3–6, 7–6^{(8–6)}, 6–0	No. 4
25.	(Czech Republic) Karolína Plíšková	No. 3	French Open, France	Clay	SF	6–4, 3–6, 6–3	No. 4
26.	(United Kingdom) Johanna Konta	No. 7	Cincinnati Open, US	Hard	QF	6–4, 7–6^{(7–1)}	No. 2
27.	(Latvia) Jeļena Ostapenko	No. 8	China Open, China	Hard	SF	6–2, 6–4	No. 2
28.	(France) Caroline Garcia	No. 8	WTA Finals, Singapore	Hard (i)	RR	6–4, 6–2	No. 1
2018
29.	(Czech Republic) Karolína Plíšková	No. 6	Australian Open, Australia	Hard	QF	6–3, 6–2	No. 1
30.	(France) Caroline Garcia	No. 7	Italian Open, Italy	Clay	QF	6–2, 6–3	No. 1
31.	(Spain) Garbiñe Muguruza	No. 3	French Open, France	Clay	SF	6–1, 6–4	No. 1
32.	(United States) Sloane Stephens	No. 10	French Open, France	Clay	F	3–6, 6–4, 6–1	No. 1
33.	(France) Caroline Garcia	No. 6	Canadian Open, Canada	Hard	QF	7–5, 6–1	No. 1
34.	(United States) Sloane Stephens	No. 3	Canadian Open, Canada	Hard	F	7–6^{(8–6)}, 3–6, 6–4	No. 1
2019
35.	(Czech Republic) Karolína Plíšková	No. 5	Fed Cup, Czech Republic	Hard (i)	QF	6–4, 5–7, 6–4	No. 3
36.	(Ukraine) Elina Svitolina	No. 7	Qatar Open, Qatar	Hard	SF	6–3, 3–6, 6–4	No. 3
37.	(Australia) Ashleigh Barty	No. 9	Madrid Open, Spain	Clay	QF	7–5, 7–5	No. 3
38.	(Ukraine) Elina Svitolina	No. 8	Wimbledon, UK	Grass	SF	6–1, 6–3	No. 7
39.	(United States) Serena Williams	No. 10	Wimbledon, UK	Grass	F	6–2, 6–2	No. 7
40.	(Canada) Bianca Andreescu	No. 4	WTA Finals, China	Hard (i)	RR	3–6, 7–6^{(8–6)}, 6–3	No. 5
2020
41.	(Czech Republic) Karolína Plíšková	No. 4	Italian Open, Italy	Clay	F	6–0, 2–1 ret.	No. 2
2022
42.	(Tunisia) Ons Jabeur	No. 10	Dubai Championships, UAE	Hard	QF	6–4, 6–3	No. 23
43.	(Spain) Paula Badosa	No. 2	Madrid Open, Spain	Clay	2R	6–3, 6–1	No. 21
44.	(Spain) Paula Badosa	No. 4	Wimbledon, UK	Grass	4R	6–1, 6–2	No. 18
45.	(United States) Jessica Pegula	No. 7	Canadian Open, Canada	Hard	SF	2–6, 6–3, 6–4	No. 15

=== Double bagel matches (6–0, 6–0) ===
No.	Result	Year	Tournament	Tier	Surface	Opponent	Rank	Round	SHR
1.	Win	2008	ITF Kristinehamn, Sweden	25,000	Clay	(Sweden) Hilda Melander	n/a	Q2	No. 493
2.	Win	2009	ITF Makarska, Croatia	50,000	Clay	(Germany) Anne Schäfer	171	QF	No. 317
3.	Win	2012	Dubai Open, UAE	WTA Premier	Hard	(Russia) Alla Kudryavtseva	98	Q1	No. 53
4.	Win	2016	Bucharest Open, Romania	WTA International	Clay	(Latvia) Anastasija Sevastova	66	F	No. 5
5.	Win	2019	Madrid Open, Spain	WTA Premier Mandatory	Clay	(Slovakia) Viktória Kužmová	46	3R	No. 3

== Longest winning streaks ==
=== 17 match win streak (2020) ===
#	Tournament	Category	Start date	Surface	Rd	Opponent	Rank	Score
–	Australian Open	Grand Slam	30 January	Hard	SF	(Spain) Garbiñe Muguruza	No. 32	6–7^{(8–10)}, 5–7
1	Dubai Championships	Premier	17 February	Hard	2R	(Tunisia) Ons Jabeur (WC)	No. 45	1–6, 6–2, 7–6^{(9–7)}
2	Dubai Championships	Premier	17 February	Hard	QF	(Belarus) Aryna Sabalenka (7)	No. 13	3–6, 6–2, 6–2
3	Dubai Championships	Premier	17 February	Hard	SF	(United States) Jennifer Brady (Q)	No. 52	6–2, 6–0
4	Dubai Championships	Premier	17 February	Hard	F	(Kazakhstan) Elena Rybakina (SE)	No. 19	3–6, 6–3, 7–6^{(7–5)}
5	Prague Open	International	10 August	Clay	1R	(Slovenia) Polona Hercog	No. 45	6–1, 1–6, 7–6^{(7–3)}
6	Prague Open	International	10 August	Clay	2R	(Czech Republic) Barbora Krejčíková (WC)	No. 118	3–6, 7–5, 6–2
7	Prague Open	International	10 August	Clay	QF	(Poland) Magdalena Fręch (LL)	No. 174	6–2, 6–0
8	Prague Open	International	10 August	Clay	SF	(Romania) Irina-Camelia Begu	No. 82	7–6^{(7–2)}, 6–3
9	Prague Open	International	10 August	Clay	F	(Belgium) Elise Mertens (3)	No. 23	6–2, 7–5
10	Italian Open	Premier 5	14 September	Clay	2R	(Italy) Jasmine Paolini (WC)	No. 99	6–3, 6–4
11	Italian Open	Premier 5	14 September	Clay	3R	(Ukraine) Dayana Yastremska	No. 29	7–5, 6–4
12	Italian Open	Premier 5	14 September	Clay	QF	(Kazakhstan) Yulia Putintseva	No. 30	6–2, 2–0, ret.
13	Italian Open	Premier 5	14 September	Clay	SF	(Spain) Garbiñe Muguruza (9)	No. 17	6–3, 4–6, 6–4
14	Italian Open	Premier 5	14 September	Clay	F	(Czech Republic) Karolína Plíšková (2)	No. 4	6–0, 2–1, ret.
15	French Open	Grand Slam	27 September	Clay	1R	(Spain) Sara Sorribes Tormo	No. 70	6–4, 6–0
16	French Open	Grand Slam	27 September	Clay	2R	(Romania) Irina-Camelia Begu	No. 72	6–3, 6–4
17	French Open	Grand Slam	27 September	Clay	3R	(United States) Amanda Anisimova (25)	No. 29	6–0, 6–1
–	French Open	Grand Slam	27 September	Clay	4R	(Poland) Iga Świątek	No. 53	1–6, 2–6

== See also ==
- 2018 Simona Halep tennis season
- 2019 Simona Halep tennis season
- 2020 Simona Halep tennis season
