= 2020 Simona Halep tennis season =

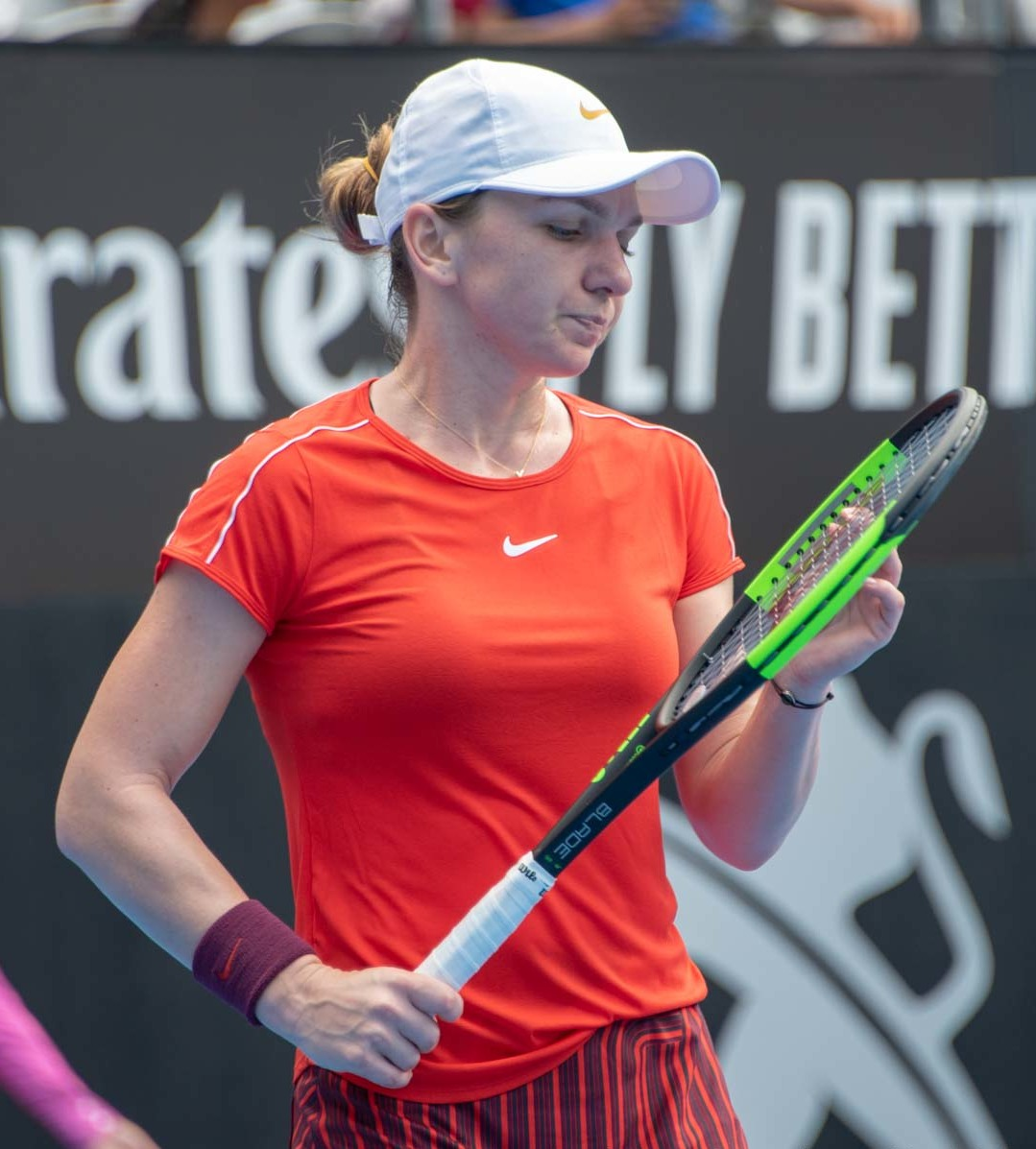
- Simona Halep at the 2019 Sydney International
- Full name: Simona Halep
- Country: Romania
- Calendar prize money: $1.94 million

Singles
- Season record: 23–3
- Calendar titles: 3
- Current ranking: No. 2
- Year-end ranking: 2
- Ranking change from previous year: ▲2

Grand Slam & significant results
- Australian Open: SF
- French Open: 4R
- Wimbledon: NH
- US Open: A
- Other tournaments

Doubles
- Calendar titles: 0
- Ranking change from previous year: Steady

Grand Slam doubles results
- Australian Open: A
- French Open: A
- Wimbledon: A
- US Open: A

Grand Slam mixed doubles results
- Australian Open: A
- French Open: A
- Wimbledon: A
- US Open: A
- Last updated on: 16 March 2023.

The 2020 Simona Halep tennis season officially began on 5 January 2020 at the Adelaide International. Simona Halep entered the season as the No.4 ranked player in the world and finished the year ranked as the No. 2 ranked player in the world and with the most titles alongside Aryna Sabalenka during the season, winning a total of 3 WTA titles. Throughout the season, she achieved a new personal record with a 17-match winning streak, commencing from the Dubai Championships, surpassing her previous performance of 15 consecutive victories dating back to early 2015. By the end of the 2020 season, she registered 23 wins and three losses.

== Singles matches ==
Tournament	Match	Round	Opponent	Rank	Result	Score
Adelaide International; Adelaide, Australia; WTA Premier; Hard, outdoor 13–18 January 2020	–	1R	Bye			
Adelaide International; Adelaide, Australia; WTA Premier; Hard, outdoor 13–18 January 2020	1	2R	(Australia) Ajla Tomljanović	52	Win	6–4, 7–5
Adelaide International; Adelaide, Australia; WTA Premier; Hard, outdoor 13–18 January 2020	2	QF	(Belarus) Aryna Sabalenka	13	Loss	4–6, 2–6
Australian Open; Melbourne, Australia; Grand Slam; Hard, outdoor 20 January – 2 February 2020
Australian Open; Melbourne, Australia; Grand Slam; Hard, outdoor 20 January – 2 February 2020	3	1R	(United States) Jennifer Brady	193	Win	7–6^{(7–5)}, 6–1
Australian Open; Melbourne, Australia; Grand Slam; Hard, outdoor 20 January – 2 February 2020	4	2R	(United Kingdom) Harriet Dart (Q)	112	Win	6–2, 6–4
Australian Open; Melbourne, Australia; Grand Slam; Hard, outdoor 20 January – 2 February 2020	5	3R	(Kazakhstan) Yulia Putintseva	76	Win	6–1, 6–4
Australian Open; Melbourne, Australia; Grand Slam; Hard, outdoor 20 January – 2 February 2020	6	4R	(Belgium) Elise Mertens (16)	16	Win	6–4, 6–4
Australian Open; Melbourne, Australia; Grand Slam; Hard, outdoor 20 January – 2 February 2020	7	QF	(Estonia) Anett Kontaveit (28)	28	Win	6–1, 6–1
Australian Open; Melbourne, Australia; Grand Slam; Hard, outdoor 20 January – 2 February 2020	8	SF	(Spain) Garbiñe Muguruza	32	Loss	6–7^{(8-10)}, 5–7
Dubai Tennis Championships; Dubai, United Arab Emirates; WTA Premier; Hard, outdoor 17–22 February 2020	–	1R	Bye			
Dubai Tennis Championships; Dubai, United Arab Emirates; WTA Premier; Hard, outdoor 17–22 February 2020	9	2R	(Tunisia) Ons Jabeur (WC)	45	Win	1–6, 6–2, 7–6^{(9-7)}
Dubai Tennis Championships; Dubai, United Arab Emirates; WTA Premier; Hard, outdoor 17–22 February 2020	10	QF	(Belarus) Aryna Sabalenka (7)	13	Win	3–6, 6–2, 6–2
Dubai Tennis Championships; Dubai, United Arab Emirates; WTA Premier; Hard, outdoor 17–22 February 2020	11	SF	(United States) Jennifer Brady (Q)	52	Win	6–2, 6–0
Dubai Tennis Championships; Dubai, United Arab Emirates; WTA Premier; Hard, outdoor 17–22 February 2020	12	W	(Kazakhstan) Elena Rybakina (SE)	19	Win (1)	3–6, 6–3, 7–6^{(7-5)}
Prague Open; Prague, Czech Republic; WTA International; Clay, outdoor 10–16 August 2020
Prague Open; Prague, Czech Republic; WTA International; Clay, outdoor 10–16 August 2020	13	1R	(Slovenia) Polona Hercog	46	Win	6–1, 1–6, 7–6^{(7-4)}
Prague Open; Prague, Czech Republic; WTA International; Clay, outdoor 10–16 August 2020	14	2R	(Czech Republic) Barbora Krejčíková (WC)	118	Win	3−6, 7–5, 6–2
Prague Open; Prague, Czech Republic; WTA International; Clay, outdoor 10–16 August 2020	15	QF	(Poland) Magdalena Fręch (LL)	174	Win	6–2, 6–0
Prague Open; Prague, Czech Republic; WTA International; Clay, outdoor 10–16 August 2020	16	SF	(Romania) Irina-Camelia Begu	82	Win	7–6^{(7-2)}, 6–3
Prague Open; Prague, Czech Republic; WTA International; Clay, outdoor 10–16 August 2020	17	W	(Belgium) Elise Mertens (3)	23	Win (2)	6–2, 7–5
Italian Open; Rome, Italy; WTA Premier 5 Clay, outdoor 14 – 21 September 2020
Italian Open; Rome, Italy; WTA Premier 5 Clay, outdoor 14 – 21 September 2020	–	1R	Bye			
Italian Open; Rome, Italy; WTA Premier 5 Clay, outdoor 14 – 21 September 2020	18	2R	(Italy) Jasmine Paolini (WC)	99	Win	6–3, 6–4
Italian Open; Rome, Italy; WTA Premier 5 Clay, outdoor 14 – 21 September 2020	19	3R	(Ukraine) Dayana Yastremska	29	Win	7–5, 6–4
Italian Open; Rome, Italy; WTA Premier 5 Clay, outdoor 14 – 21 September 2020	20	QF	(Kazakhstan) Yulia Putintseva	30	Win	6–2, 2-0 ret.
Italian Open; Rome, Italy; WTA Premier 5 Clay, outdoor 14 – 21 September 2020	21	SF	(Spain) Garbiñe Muguruza (9)	17	Win	6–3, 4–6, 6–4
Italian Open; Rome, Italy; WTA Premier 5 Clay, outdoor 14 – 21 September 2020	22	W	(Czech Republic) Karolína Plíšková (2)	4	Win (3)	6–0, 2–1 ret.
French Open; Paris, France; Grand Slam; Clay, outdoor 27 September – 11 October 2020	23	1R	(Spain) Sara Sorribes Tormo	70	Win	6–4, 6–0
French Open; Paris, France; Grand Slam; Clay, outdoor 27 September – 11 October 2020	24	2R	(Romania) Irina-Camelia Begu	73	Win	6–3, 6–4
French Open; Paris, France; Grand Slam; Clay, outdoor 27 September – 11 October 2020	25	3R	(United States) Amanda Anisimova (25)	29	Win	6–0, 6–1
French Open; Paris, France; Grand Slam; Clay, outdoor 27 September – 11 October 2020	26	4R	(Poland) Iga Świątek	54	Loss	1–6, 2–6

== Tournament schedule ==
=== Singles schedule ===
Halep's 2020 singles schedule was cut short due to the COVID-19 pandemic, participating in only six tournaments: 2 Grand Slams and 4 WTA-tour level tournaments. Nevertheless, she clinched titles in half of these tournaments.

Date	Championship	Location	Category	Surface	2019 result	2019 points	2020 points	Outcome
13 January – 18 January	Adelaide International	Adelaide	Premier	Hard	NH	0	100	Quarterfinals lost to (Belarus) Aryna Sabalenka; 4–6, 2–6
20 January – 1 February	Australian Open	Melbourne	Grand Slam	Hard	4R	240	780	Semifinals lost to (Spain) Garbiñe Muguruza; 6–7^{(8–10)}, 5–7
17 February – 22 February	Dubai Tennis Championships	Dubai	Premier (Note: Dubai Tennis Championships was a Premier 5 tournament in 2019.)	Hard	QF	190	470	Winner defeated (Kazakhstan) Elena Rybakina; 3−6, 6−3, 7–6^{(7–5)}
23 February – 29 February	Qatar Open	Doha	Premier 5 (Note: Qatar Total Open was a Premier tournament in 2019.)	Hard	F	305	0	Withdrew due to fatigue
9 March – 22 March	BNP Paribas Open	Indian Wells	Premier Mandatory	Hard	4R	120	0	Withdrew due to right foot injury, tournament cancellation
10 August – 16 August	Prague Open	Prague	International	Clay	DNP	0	280	Winner defeated (Belgium) Elise Mertens; 6−2, 7−5
14 September – 21 September	Italian Open	Rome	Premier 5	Clay	2R	1	900	Winner defeated (Czech Republic) Karolína Plíšková; 6–0, 2–1 ret.
27 September – 10 October	French Open	Paris	Grand Slam	Clay	QF	430	240	Fourth round lost to (Poland) Iga Świątek; 1–6, 2–6
Road to the WTA Finals points						4962	2770	▼2192 difference
Total year-end points						5461	7255	▲1794 difference

== Yearly records ==
=== Finals ===
Singles: 3 (3 titles)

Legend Grand Slam tournaments (0–0) WTA Tour Championships (0–0) Premier Mandatory & Premier 5 (1–0) Premier (1–0) International (1–0)	Finals by surface Hard (1–0) Clay (2–0) Grass (0–0)	Titles by setting Outdoors (3–0) Indoors (0–0)

Result	W–L	Date	Tournament	Tier	Surface	Opponent	Score
Win	1–0	Feb 2020	Dubai Tennis Championships, UAE	Premier	Hard	(Kazakhstan) Elena Rybakina	3−6, 6−3, 7–6^{(7–5)}
Win	2–0	Aug 2020	Prague Open, Czech Republic	International	Clay	(Belgium) Elise Mertens	6–2, 7–5
Win	3–0	Sep 2020	Italian Open, Italy	Premier 5	Clay	(Czech Republic) Karolína Plíšková	6–0, 2–1 ret.

=== Top 10 wins ===
#	Player	Rank	Tournament	Surface	Round	Score	SHR
1.	(Czech Republic) Karolína Plíšková	4	Italian Open, Rome, Italy	Clay	Final	6–0, 2–1 ret.	**2**

=== Head-to-head matchups ===
Surface	Win–loss	Win%
**Hard**	10–2	83.33%
**Clay**	13–1	92.86%
**Grass**	0–0	–
Overall	23–3	88.46%

Players are ordered by letter. (Bold denotes a top 10 player at the time of the most recent match during 2020, Italic denotes top 50.)

- (Belgium) Elise Mertens 2–0
- (Romania) Irina-Camelia Begu 2–0
- (United States) Jennifer Brady 2–0
- (Kazakhstan) Yulia Putintseva 2–0
- (Australia) Ajla Tomljanović 1–0
- (United States) Amanda Anisimova 1–0
- (Estonia) Anett Kontaveit 1–0
- (Czech Republic) Barbora Krejčíková 1–0
- (Ukraine) Dayana Yastremska 1–0
- (Kazakhstan) Elena Rybakina 1–0
- (United Kingdom) Harriet Dart 1-0
- (Italy) Jasmine Paolini 1–0
- (Czech Republic) **Karolína Plíšková** 1–0
- (Poland) Magdalena Fręch 1–0
- (Tunisia) Ons Jabeur 1–0
- (Slovenia) Polona Hercog 1–0
- (Spain) Sara Sorribes Tormo 1–0
- (Belarus) Aryna Sabalenka 1–1
- (Spain) Garbiñe Muguruza 1–1
- (Poland) Iga Świątek 0–1
