= 2013 Kremlin Cup – Women's doubles =

Women's doubles
- 2013 Kremlin Cup

Final
- Champions: (Russia) Svetlana Kuznetsova (Australia) Samantha Stosur
- Runners-up: (Russia) Alla Kudryavtseva (Australia) Anastasia Rodionova
- Score: 6–1, 1–6, [10–8]

Details
- Seeds: 4

Events
Singles	men	women
Doubles	men	women
← 2012 ·	Kremlin Cup	· 2014 →

Ekaterina Makarova and Elena Vesnina were the defending champions, but Makarova withdrew due to injury. Vesnina partnered up with Daniela Hantuchová, but they retired in the quarterfinals due to Hantuchová's injury.
Svetlana Kuznetsova and Samantha Stosur won the title, defeating Alla Kudryavtseva and Anastasia Rodionova in the final, 6–1, 1–6, [10–8].

== Seeds ==
1. (Slovakia) Daniela Hantuchová / (Russia) Elena Vesnina (quarterfinals, retired)
2. (Russia) Alla Kudryavtseva / (Australia) Anastasia Rodionova (final)
3. (Russia) Vera Dushevina / (Spain) Arantxa Parra Santonja (quarterfinals)
4. (United States) Liezel Huber / (Poland) Alicja Rosolska (semifinals)

== Draw ==
=== Key ===
- Q = Qualifier
- WC = Wild card
- LL = Lucky loser
- Alt = Alternate
- SE = Special exempt
- PR = Protected ranking
- ITF = ITF entry
- JE = Junior exempt
- w/o = Walkover
- r = Retired
- d = Defaulted
- SR = Special ranking

=== Draw ===
First round
1	(Slovakia) D Hantuchová (Russia) E Vesnina	7	6
(Ukraine) Y Beygelzimer (Serbia) V Dolonc	5	3
WC	(Russia) A Bukhanko (Russia) M Gasparyan	3	6	[5]
(Slovakia) J Husárová (Czech Republic) K Zakopalová	6	3	[10]
3	(Russia) V Dushevina (Spain) A Parra Santonja	6	6
(France) C Garcia (United States) M Moulton-Levy	3	0
(Russia) S Kuznetsova (Australia) S Stosur	6	7
(Italy) ME Camerin (Poland) P Kania	4	5
(Romania) R Olaru (Ukraine) O Savchuk	7^{7}	3	[10]
(United States) V King (United States) V Lepchenko	6^{5}	6	[6]
(Ukraine) I Buryachok (Georgia (country)) O Kalashnikova	2	6^{5}
4	(United States) L Huber (Poland) A Rosolska	6	7^{7}
(Russia) A Pavlyuchenkova (Kazakhstan) Y Shvedova	7^{7}	6
(Russia) A Kleybanova (Kazakhstan) G Voskoboeva	6^{1}	4
(Russia) A Panova (Russia) V Solovyeva	2	3
2	(Russia) A Kudryavtseva (Australia) A Rodionova	6	6

Quarterfinals
1	(Slovakia) D Hantuchová (Russia) E Vesnina	5	0^{r}
(Slovakia) J Husárová (Czech Republic) K Zakopalová	7	0
3	(Russia) V Dushevina (Spain) A Parra Santonja	3	2
(Russia) S Kuznetsova (Australia) S Stosur	6	6
(Romania) R Olaru (Ukraine) O Savchuk	5	1
4	(United States) L Huber (Poland) A Rosolska	7	6
(Russia) A Pavlyuchenkova (Kazakhstan) Y Shvedova	3	5
2	(Russia) A Kudryavtseva (Australia) A Rodionova	6	7

Semifinals
(Slovakia) J Husárová (Czech Republic) K Zakopalová	3	2
(Russia) S Kuznetsova (Australia) S Stosur	6	6
4	(United States) L Huber (Poland) A Rosolska	5	2
2	(Russia) A Kudryavtseva (Australia) A Rodionova	7	6

Final
(Russia) S Kuznetsova (Australia) S Stosur	6	1	[10]
2	(Russia) A Kudryavtseva (Australia) A Rodionova	1	6	[8]
