= 2013 Kremlin Cup – Men's singles =

Men's singles
- 2013 Kremlin Cup

Final
- Champion: (France) Richard Gasquet
- Runner-up: (Kazakhstan) Mikhail Kukushkin
- Score: 4–6, 6–4, 6–4

Details
- Draw: 28 (4 Q / 3 WC )
- Seeds: 8

Events
Singles	men	women
Doubles	men	women
- Kremlin Cup

Andreas Seppi was the defending champion, but lost in the semifinals to Mikhail Kukushkin.
Richard Gasquet won the title, defeating Kukushkin in the final, 4–6, 6–4, 6–4.

== Seeds ==
The first four seeds received a bye into the second round.

1. (France) Richard Gasquet (champion)
2. (Italy) Andreas Seppi (semifinals)
3. (Serbia) Janko Tipsarević (second round)
4. (Ukraine) Alexandr Dolgopolov (second round)
5. (Uzbekistan) Denis Istomin (second round)
6. (Argentina) Horacio Zeballos (second round)
7. (Portugal) João Sousa (first round)
8. (France) Adrian Mannarino (first round)

== Draw ==
Key

- Q = Qualifier
- WC = Wild card
- LL = Lucky loser
- Alt = Alternate
- ITF = ITF entry
- PR = Protected ranking
- SR = Special ranking
- SE = Special exempt
- JE = Junior exempt
- JR = Junior Accelerator Programme entrant
- CO = College Accelerator Programme entrant
- NG = Next Gen Accelerator Program entrant
- w/o = Walkover
- r = Retired
- d = Defaulted

=== Finals ===
Semifinals
1	(France) Richard Gasquet	6	7
(Croatia) Ivo Karlović	4	5
Q	(Kazakhstan) Mikhail Kukushkin	6	1	6
2	(Italy) Andreas Seppi	1	6	4

Final
1	(France) Richard Gasquet	4	6	6
Q	(Kazakhstan) Mikhail Kukushkin	6	4	4

=== Top half ===
First round
(Cyprus) M Baghdatis	3	6	4
(Russia) E Donskoy	6	3	6
(Israel) D Sela	6	6
Q	(Russia) A Karatsev	4	3
WC	(Russia) T Gabashvili	3	6	6
8	(France) A Mannarino	6	4	4
WC	(Russia) K Khachanov	6	3	6
(Spain) A Ramos	2	6	4
(Croatia) I Karlović	6	6
(United States) D Kudla	2	3
WC	(Russia) A Kuznetsov	0	6	1
5	(Uzbekistan) D Istomin	6	2	6

Second round
1	(France) R Gasquet	6	3	6
(Russia) E Donskoy	3	6	1
(Israel) D Sela	1	7^{9}	1
WC	(Russia) T Gabashvili	6	6^{7}	6
3	(Serbia) J Tipsarević	4	4
WC	(Russia) K Khachanov	6	6
(Croatia) I Karlović	6	6^{10}	7^{8}
5	(Uzbekistan) D Istomin	3	7^{12}	6^{6}

Quarterfinals
1	(France) R Gasquet	6	6
WC	(Russia) T Gabashvili	3	2
WC	(Russia) K Khachanov	4	0
(Croatia) I Karlović	6	6

Semifinals
1	(France) R Gasquet	6	7
(Croatia) I Karlović	4	5

=== Bottom half ===
First round
6	(Argentina) H Zeballos	1	6	6
(Lithuania) R Berankis	6	3	4
Q	(Ukraine) O Nedovyesov	2	5
Q	(Kazakhstan) A Golubev	6	7
(Russia) A Bogomolov Jr.	4	1
Q	(Kazakhstan) M Kukushkin	6	6
7	(Portugal) J Sousa	4	3
(Ukraine) S Stakhovsky	6	6
(Czech Republic) J Veselý	3	7^{7}	3
(France) É Roger-Vasselin	6	6^{3}	6
(Italy) F Volandri	6	5	1^{r}
(Italy) P Lorenzi	3	7	4

Second round
6	(Argentina) H Zeballos	3	4
Q	(Kazakhstan) A Golubev	6	6
Q	(Kazakhstan) M Kukushkin	6	6
4	(Ukraine) A Dolgopolov	4	4
(Ukraine) S Stakhovsky	5	5
(France) É Roger-Vasselin	7	7
(Italy) P Lorenzi	3	2
2	(Italy) A Seppi	6	6

Quarterfinals
Q	(Kazakhstan) A Golubev	4	6^{4}
Q	(Kazakhstan) M Kukushkin	6	7^{7}
(France) É Roger-Vasselin	2^{r}
2	(Italy) A Seppi	5

Semifinals
Q	(Kazakhstan) M Kukushkin	6	1	6
2	(Italy) A Seppi	1	6	4

== Qualifying ==
=== Seeds ===
1. (Kazakhstan) Mikhail Kukushkin (qualified)
2. (Ukraine) Oleksandr Nedovyesov (qualified)
3. (Kazakhstan) Andrey Golubev (qualified)
4. (Serbia) Dušan Lajović (second round)
5. (Russia) Konstantin Kravchuk (qualifying competition)
6. (Czech Republic) Jan Mertl (qualifying competition)
7. (Moldova) Radu Albot (first round)
8. (Belarus) Uladzimir Ignatik (first round)

=== Qualifiers ===
1. (Kazakhstan) Mikhail Kukushkin
2. (Ukraine) Oleksandr Nedovyesov
3. (Kazakhstan) Andrey Golubev
4. (Russia) Aslan Karatsev

=== Qualifying draw ===
==== First qualifier ====
First round
1	(Kazakhstan) Mikhail Kukushkin	6	6
(Uzbekistan) Vaja Uzakov	0	1
(Russia) Stepan Khotulev	4	6	0
(Russia) Mikhail Biryukov	6	1	6
(United Kingdom) Neal Skupski	6	4	3
(Czech Republic) Roman Jebavý	1	6	6
WC	(Russia) Ilya Vasilyev	3	2
5	(Russia) Konstantin Kravchuk	6	6

Second round
1	(Kazakhstan) Mikhail Kukushkin	7^{7}	7
(Russia) Mikhail Biryukov	6^{5}	5
(Czech Republic) Roman Jebavý	5	6	2
5	(Russia) Konstantin Kravchuk	7	3	6

Qualifying competition
1	(Kazakhstan) Mikhail Kukushkin	6	6
5	(Russia) Konstantin Kravchuk	1	3

==== Second qualifier ====
First round
2	(Ukraine) Oleksandr Nedovyesov	6	6
(Russia) Sergey Strelkov	1	3
(Belarus) Dzmitry Zhyrmont	6	6^{5}	5
(Russia) Richard Muzaev	4	7^{7}	7
(Russia) Andrey Rublev	2	3
(Belarus) Egor Gerasimov	6	6
(Russia) Alexander Lobkov	4	6	6
7	(Moldova) Radu Albot	6	1	1

Second round
2	(Ukraine) Oleksandr Nedovyesov	6	6
(Russia) Richard Muzaev	4	3
(Belarus) Egor Gerasimov	6	2	7
(Russia) Alexander Lobkov	4	6	5

Qualifying competition
2	(Ukraine) Oleksandr Nedovyesov	6	5	7^{7}
(Belarus) Egor Gerasimov	4	7	6^{5}

==== Third qualifier ====
First round
3	(Kazakhstan) Andrey Golubev	6	6
(Russia) Anton Zaitsev	2	1
WC	(Russia) Vladimir Polyakov	3	1
(Russia) Denis Matsukevich	6	6
(Russia) Valery Rudnev	6	4	2
(Russia) Alexander Rumyantsev	0	6	6
(Russia) Alexey Vatutin	0	4
6	(Czech Republic) Jan Mertl	6	6

Second round
3	(Kazakhstan) Andrey Golubev	6	6
(Russia) Denis Matsukevich	0	1
(Russia) Alexander Rumyantsev	6	2	4
6	(Czech Republic) Jan Mertl	2	6	6

Qualifying competition
3	(Kazakhstan) Andrey Golubev	6	6
6	(Czech Republic) Jan Mertl	3	2

==== Fourth qualifier ====
First round
4	(Serbia) Dušan Lajović	6	6
(Croatia) Franko Škugor	4	2
(Russia) Victor Baluda	6	6
WC	(Russia) Daniil Medvedev	4	0
(Slovakia) Michal Mertiňák	6	6
WC	(Russia) Boris Pokotilov	4	2
(Russia) Aslan Karatsev	6	7^{7}
8	(Belarus) Uladzimir Ignatik	2	6^{4}

Second round
4	(Serbia) Dušan Lajović	6	6^{2}	3
(Russia) Victor Baluda	2	7^{7}	6
(Slovakia) Michal Mertiňák	3	4
(Russia) Aslan Karatsev	6	6

Qualifying competition
(Russia) Victor Baluda	6	6^{1}	2
(Russia) Aslan Karatsev	0	7^{7}	6
