= 2012 Kremlin Cup – Men's singles =

Men's singles
- 2012 Kremlin Cup

Final
- Champion: (Italy) Andreas Seppi
- Runner-up: (Brazil) Thomaz Bellucci
- Score: 3–6, 7–6^{(7–3)}, 6–3

Details
- Draw: 28 (4 Q / 3 WC )
- Seeds: 8

Events
Singles	men	women
Doubles	men	women
- Kremlin Cup

Janko Tipsarević was the defending champion, but decided to participate at 2012 Erste Bank Open instead.
Andreas Seppi won the final over Brazilian Thomaz Bellucci with the score 3–6, 7–6^{(7–3)}, 6–3.

== Seeds ==
The first four seeds received a bye into the second round.

1. (Ukraine) Alexandr Dolgopolov (second round)
2. (Italy) Andreas Seppi (champion)
3. (Serbia) Viktor Troicki (second round)
4. (Brazil) Thomaz Bellucci (final)
5. (Russia) Nikolay Davydenko (first round)
6. (Uzbekistan) Denis Istomin (second round)
7. (Argentina) Carlos Berlocq (second round)
8. (Japan) Tatsuma Ito (quarterfinals)

== Draw ==
Key

- Q = Qualifier
- WC = Wild card
- LL = Lucky loser
- Alt = Alternate
- ITF = ITF entry
- PR = Protected ranking
- SR = Special ranking
- SE = Special exempt
- JE = Junior exempt
- JR = Junior Accelerator Programme entrant
- CO = College Accelerator Programme entrant
- NG = Next Gen Accelerator Program entrant
- w/o = Walkover
- r = Retired
- d = Defaulted

=== Finals ===
Semifinals
(Croatia) Ivo Karlović	7^{7}	4	4
4	(Brazil) Thomaz Bellucci	6^{5}	6	6
(Tunisia) Malek Jaziri	3	1
2	(Italy) Andreas Seppi	6	6

Final
4	(Brazil) Thomaz Bellucci	6	6^{3}	3
2	(Italy) Andreas Seppi	3	7^{7}	6

=== Top half ===
First round
Q	(France) É Roger-Vasselin	6	4	6
WC	(Russia) E Donskoy	4	6	3
(Italy) S Bolelli	4	6^{4}
(Croatia) I Karlović	6	7^{7}
(Russia) A Bogomolov Jr.	7	6
5	(Russia) N Davydenko	5	4
WC	(Russia) T Gabashvili	4	4
(Italy) F Cipolla	6	6
(Poland) J Janowicz	7^{8}	6
(Germany) B Becker	6^{6}	3
WC	(Russia) A Kuznetsov	6	4	3
7	(Argentina) C Berlocq	1	6	6

Second round
1	(Ukraine) A Dolgopolov	3	7	6^{6}
Q	(France) É Roger-Vasselin	6	5	7^{8}
(Croatia) I Karlović	7^{13}	6
(Russia) A Bogomolov Jr.	6^{11}	4
4	(Brazil) T Bellucci	6	6
(Italy) F Cipolla	4	1
(Poland) J Janowicz	6	6
7	(Argentina) C Berlocq	3	4

Quarterfinals
Q	(France) É Roger-Vasselin	6^{4}	3
(Croatia) I Karlović	7^{7}	6
4	(Brazil) T Bellucci	6	7^{7}
(Poland) J Janowicz	4	6^{3}

Semifinals
(Croatia) I Karlović	7^{7}	4	4
4	(Brazil) T Bellucci	6^{5}	6	6

=== Bottom half ===
First round
6	(Uzbekistan) D Istomin	5	7	6
(Germany) B Phau	7	5	1
(Spain) D Gimeno-Traver	6^{9}	6^{2}
(Czech Republic) L Rosol	7^{11}	7^{7}
(United States) R Ram	3	1
(Tunisia) M Jaziri	6	6
8	(Japan) T Ito	6	1	6
(Spain) R Bautista-Agut	3	6	2
Q	(Russia) K Kravchuk	6	6
Q	(Kazakhstan) E Korolev	4	3
Q	(Germany) M Berrer	6^{7}	3
(Netherlands) I Sijsling	7^{9}	6

Second round
6	(Uzbekistan) D Istomin	6	4	3
(Czech Republic) L Rosol	4	6	6
(Tunisia) M Jaziri	6	3	6
3	(Serbia) V Troicki	1	6	2
8	(Japan) T Ito	7^{9}	2	6
Q	(Russia) K Kravchuk	6^{7}	6	3
(Netherlands) I Sijsling	5	2
2	(Italy) A Seppi	7	6

Quarterfinals
(Czech Republic) L Rosol	6^{5}	3
(Tunisia) M Jaziri	7^{7}	6
8	(Japan) T Ito	2	1
2	(Italy) A Seppi	6	6

Semifinals
(Tunisia) M Jaziri	3	1
2	(Italy) A Seppi	6	6

== Qualifying ==
=== Seeds ===
1. (Romania) Victor Hănescu (second round)
2. (Israel) Dudi Sela (qualifying competition)
3. (France) Édouard Roger-Vasselin (qualified)
4. (Germany) Michael Berrer (qualified)
5. (Serbia) Dušan Lajović (second round)
6. (Russia) Igor Kunitsyn (second round)
7. (Ukraine) Ivan Sergeyev (second round)
8. (Kazakhstan) Andrey Golubev (qualifying competition)

=== Qualifiers ===
1. (Kazakhstan) Evgeny Korolev
2. (Russia) Konstantin Kravchuk
3. (France) Édouard Roger-Vasselin
4. (Germany) Michael Berrer

=== Draw ===
==== First qualifier ====
First round
1	(Romania) Victor Hănescu	6	6
WC	(Russia) Alexander Vasilenko	3	1
(Romania) Petru-Alexandru Luncanu	3	2
(Kazakhstan) Evgeny Korolev	6	6
WC	(Russia) Evgeny Elistratov	6	3	2
WC	(Russia) Richard Muzaev	3	6	6
(Belarus) Sergey Betov	5	3
6	(Russia) Igor Kunitsyn	7	6

Second round
1	(Romania) Victor Hănescu	4	1
(Kazakhstan) Evgeny Korolev	6	6
WC	(Russia) Richard Muzaev	6	3	6
6	(Russia) Igor Kunitsyn	3	6	3

Qualifying competition
(Kazakhstan) Evgeny Korolev	6	6
WC	(Russia) Richard Muzaev	0	1

==== Second qualifier ====
First round
2	(Israel) Dudi Sela	6	6
(Russia) Andrey Kumantsov	3	0
(Russia) Mikhail Fufygin	6^{2}	2
(Ukraine) Oleksandr Nedovyesov	7^{7}	6
(Moldova) Maxim Dubarenco	7	6^{5}	4
(Russia) Konstantin Kravchuk	5	7^{7}	6
(Ukraine) Stanislav Poplavskyy	4	6^{0}
7	(Ukraine) Ivan Sergeyev	6	7^{7}

Second round
2	(Israel) Dudi Sela	4
(Ukraine) Oleksandr Nedovyesov	0^{r}
(Russia) Konstantin Kravchuk	7^{8}	6
7	(Ukraine) Ivan Sergeyev	6^{6}	4

Qualifying competition
2	(Israel) Dudi Sela	3	7	3
(Russia) Konstantin Kravchuk	6	5	6

==== Third qualifier ====
First round
3	(France) Édouard Roger-Vasselin	6	6
(Russia) Alexander Lobkov	4	4
(Ukraine) Artem Smirnov	3	3
(Belarus) Dzmitry Zhyrmont	6	6
(Russia) Mikhail Biryukov	6^{2}	6	2
(Poland) Michał Przysiężny	7^{7}	4	6
WC	(Russia) Aslan Karatsev	6^{3}	6	5
5	(Serbia) Dušan Lajović	7^{7}	3	7

Second round
3	(France) Édouard Roger-Vasselin	6	6
(Belarus) Dzmitry Zhyrmont	2	1
(Poland) Michał Przysiężny	6	6
5	(Serbia) Dušan Lajović	4	3

Qualifying competition
3	(France) Édouard Roger-Vasselin	6	6
(Poland) Michał Przysiężny	2	4

==== Fourth qualifier ====
First round
4	(Germany) Michael Berrer	6	6
(Russia) Alexander Kudryavtsev	0	3
(Georgia (country)) Nikoloz Basilashvili	6	1	7
(Moldova) Radu Albot	3	6	5
(Russia) Denis Matsukevitch	6	1	5
(Netherlands) Matwé Middelkoop	3	6	7
(Spain) Adrián Menéndez	5	4
8	(Kazakhstan) Andrey Golubev	7	6

Second round
4	(Germany) Michael Berrer	6	6
(Georgia (country)) Nikoloz Basilashvili	1	3
(Netherlands) Matwé Middelkoop	3	2
8	(Kazakhstan) Andrey Golubev	6	6

Qualifying competition
4	(Germany) Michael Berrer	4	6	6
8	(Kazakhstan) Andrey Golubev	6	4	3
