= 2012 Kremlin Cup =

- Date: 13–21 October
- Edition: 23rd (men) / 17th (women)
- Surface: Hard / indoor
- Location: Moscow, Russia
- Venue: Olympic Stadium

Champions

Men's singles
- (Italy) Andreas Seppi

Women's singles
- (Denmark) Caroline Wozniacki

Men's doubles
- (Czech Republic) František Čermák / (Slovakia) Michal Mertiňák

Women's doubles
- (Russia) Ekaterina Makarova / (Russia) Elena Vesnina
← 2011 ·	Kremlin Cup	· 2013 →

The 2012 Kremlin Cup was a tennis tournament played on indoor hard courts. It was the 23rd edition of the Kremlin Cup for the men (17th edition for the women) and was part of the ATP World Tour 250 Series of the 2012 ATP World Tour, and of the Premier Series of the 2012 WTA Tour. It was held at the Olympic Stadium in Moscow, Russia, from 13 October through 21 October 2012. Andreas Seppi and Caroline Wozniacki won the singles title.

== ATP singles main-draw entrants ==
=== Seeds ===
Country	Player	Rank^{1}	Seed
UKR	Alexandr Dolgopolov	20	1
ITA	Andreas Seppi	26	2
SRB	Viktor Troicki	32	3
BRA	Thomaz Bellucci	39	4
RUS	Nikolay Davydenko	42	5
UZB	Denis Istomin	44	6
ARG	Carlos Berlocq	49	7
JPN	Tatsuma Ito	65	8

- Seeds are based on the rankings of October 8, 2012

=== Other entrants ===
The following players received wildcards into the singles main draw:

- (Russia) Evgeny Donskoy
- (Russia) Teymuraz Gabashvili
- (Russia) Andrey Kuznetsov

The following players received entry from the qualifying draw:

- (Kazakhstan) Evgeny Korolev
- (Russia) Konstantin Kravchuk
- (France) Édouard Roger-Vasselin
- (Germany) Michael Berrer

=== Withdrawals ===
- (Germany) Tobias Kamke
- (Kazakhstan) Mikhail Kukushkin
- (Chinese Taipei) Lu Yen-hsun

== ATP doubles main-draw entrants ==
=== Seeds ===
Country	Player	Country	Player	Rank^{1}	Seed
CZE	František Čermák	SVK	Michal Mertiňák	82	1
RUS	Mikhail Elgin	UZB	Denis Istomin	117	2
ARG	Carlos Berlocq	RUS	Alex Bogomolov Jr.	156	3
AUS	Rameez Junaid	USA	Scott Lipsky	158	4

- Rankings are as of October 8, 2012

=== Other entrants ===
The following pairs received wildcards into the doubles main draw:

- (Russia) Evgeny Donskoy / (Russia) Igor Kunitsyn
- (Russia) Teymuraz Gabashvili / (Russia) Andrey Kuznetsov

== WTA singles main-draw entrants ==
=== Seeds ===
Country	Player	Rank^{1}	Seed
AUS	Samantha Stosur	9	1
FRA	Marion Bartoli	10	2
DEN	Caroline Wozniacki	11	3
SRB	Ana Ivanovic	12	4
SVK	Dominika Cibulková	13	5
RUS	Nadia Petrova	14	6
RUS	Maria Kirilenko	16	7
CZE	Lucie Šafářová	18	8

- Seeds are based on the rankings of October 8, 2012

=== Other entrants ===
The following players received wildcards into the singles main draw:

- (Russia) Margarita Gasparyan
- (Russia) Elena Vesnina
- (Denmark) Caroline Wozniacki

The following players received entry from the qualifying draw:

- (Serbia) Vesna Dolonc
- (Australia) Anastasia Rodionova
- (Russia) Valeria Solovieva
- (Ukraine) Elina Svitolina

=== Withdrawals ===
- (New Zealand) Marina Erakovic
- (Italy) Sara Errani (left thigh injury)
- (Estonia) Kaia Kanepi
- (Canada) Aleksandra Wozniak

== WTA doubles main-draw entrants ==
=== Seeds ===
Country	Player	Country	Player	Rank^{1}	Seed
RUS	Ekaterina Makarova	RUS	Elena Vesnina	18	1
RUS	Maria Kirilenko	RUS	Nadia Petrova	18	2
ESP	Nuria Llagostera Vives	IND	Sania Mirza	22	3
KAZ	Yaroslava Shvedova	SLO	Katarina Srebotnik	31	4

- ^{1} Rankings are as of October 8, 2012

=== Other entrants ===
The following pair received wildcard into the doubles main draw:

- (Russia) Anastasia Frolova / (Russia) Margarita Gasparyan

== Finals ==
=== Men's singles ===
- (Italy) Andreas Seppi defeated (Brazil) Thomaz Bellucci, 3–6, 7–6^{(7–3)}, 6–3

=== Women's singles ===
- (Denmark) Caroline Wozniacki defeated (Australia) Samantha Stosur, 6–2, 4–6, 7–5

=== Men's doubles ===
- (Czech Republic) František Čermák / (Slovakia) Michal Mertiňák defeated (Italy) Simone Bolelli / (Italy) Daniele Bracciali, 7–5, 6–3

=== Women's doubles ===
- (Russia) Ekaterina Makarova / (Russia) Elena Vesnina defeated (Russia) Maria Kirilenko / (Russia) Nadia Petrova, 6–3, 1–6, [10–8]
