= 2020 Prague Open =

- Date: 10–16 August
- Edition: 11th
- Draw: 32S / 16D
- Surface: Clay / outdoor
- Location: Prague, Czech Republic
- Venue: TK Sparta Prague

Champions

Singles
- (Romania) Simona Halep

Doubles
- (Czech Republic) Lucie Hradecká / (Czech Republic) Kristýna Plíšková
- WTA Prague Open

The 2020 Prague Open (branded as the 2020 J&T Banka Prague Open for sponsorship reasons) was a professional women's tennis tournament that was played on outdoor clay courts at the TK Sparta Prague in Prague, Czech Republic. It was a WTA International-class tournament on the 2020 WTA Tour.

The tournament was played from 10 to 16 August 2020, delayed from its usual late-April scheduling due to the COVID-19 pandemic. The tournament was held simultaneously with a second, U.S.-based event, the Top Seed Open in Kentucky, in order to provide additional options for players leading into the 2020 Western & Southern Open in New York City.

== Finals ==
=== Singles ===
(Romania) Simona Halep defeated (Belgium) Elise Mertens, 6–2, 7–5

- It was Halep's 2nd singles title of the year and the 21st of her career.

=== Doubles ===
(Czech Republic) Lucie Hradecká / (Czech Republic) Kristýna Plíšková defeated (Romania) Monica Niculescu / (Romania) Raluca Olaru, 6–2, 6–2

== Points and prize money ==
=== Point distribution ===
| Event | W | F | SF | QF | Round of 16 | Round of 32 | Q | Q3 | Q2 | Q1 |
| Singles | 280 | 180 | 110 | 60 | 30 | 1 | 18 | 14 | 10 | 1 |
| Doubles | 280 | 180 | 110 | 60 | 1 | —N/a | —N/a | —N/a | —N/a | —N/a |

=== Prize money ===
| Event | W | F | SF | QF | Round of 16 | Round of 32 | Q3 | Q2 | Q1 |
| Singles | $25,000 | $14,000 | $8,035 | $5,000 | $3,150 | $2,300 | $1,080 | $940 | $800 |
| Doubles* | $9,000 | $5,000 | $3,230 | $1,980 | $1,520 | —N/a | —N/a | —N/a | —N/a |

_{*per team}

== Singles main draw entrants ==
=== Seeds ===
| Country | Player | Rank^{1} | Seed |
|---|---|---|---|
| ROU | Simona Halep | 2 | 1 |
| CRO | Petra Martić | 15 | 2 |
| BEL | Elise Mertens | 23 | 3 |
| ~~UKR~~ | ~~Dayana Yastremska~~ | ~~25~~ | ~~4~~ |
| RUS | Ekaterina Alexandrova | 27 | 5 |
| RUS | Anastasia Pavlyuchenkova | 30 | 6 |
| CZE | Barbora Strýcová | 31 | 7 |
| RUS | Veronika Kudermetova | 40 | 8 |
| LAT | Anastasija Sevastova | 43 | 9 |

- Rankings are as of March 16, 2020

=== Other entrants ===
The following players received wildcards into the singles main draw:

- (Canada) Eugenie Bouchard
- (Czech Republic) Linda Fruhvirtová
- (Czech Republic) Barbora Krejčíková

The following players received entry from the qualifying draw:

- (Ukraine) Marta Kostyuk
- (Romania) Elena-Gabriela Ruse
- (Egypt) Mayar Sherif
- (Ukraine) Lesia Tsurenko

The following players received entry as a lucky loser:

- (Poland) Magdalena Fręch
- (Switzerland) Leonie Küng
- (Australia) Storm Sanders

=== Withdrawals ===
Before the tournament

- (Switzerland) Belinda Bencic → replaced by (Italy) Camila Giorgi
- (France) Fiona Ferro → replaced by (Switzerland) Leonie Küng
- (Estonia) Anett Kontaveit → replaced by (Germany) Laura Siegemund
- (France) Kristina Mladenovic → replaced by (Slovenia) Tamara Zidanšek
- (Czech Republic) Karolína Muchová → replaced by (Romania) Ana Bogdan
- (Latvia) Jeļena Ostapenko → replaced by (Italy) Jasmine Paolini
- (Kazakhstan) Elena Rybakina → replaced by (Spain) Sara Sorribes Tormo
- (Greece) Maria Sakkari → replaced by (Netherlands) Arantxa Rus
- (Poland) Iga Świątek → replaced by (Australia) Storm Sanders
- (Belgium) Alison Van Uytvanck → replaced by (Czech Republic) Kristýna Plíšková
- (Croatia) Donna Vekić → replaced by (Romania) Patricia Maria Țig
- (Czech Republic) Markéta Vondroušová → replaced by (Romania) Irina-Camelia Begu
- (Ukraine) Dayana Yastremska → replaced by (Poland) Magdalena Fręch

During the tournament

- (Ukraine) Lesia Tsurenko

== Doubles main draw entrants ==
=== Seeds ===
| Country | Player | Country | Player | Rank^{1} | Seed |
|---|---|---|---|---|---|
| CZE | Barbora Krejčíková | CZE | Kateřina Siniaková | 17 | 1 |
| CZE | Lucie Hradecká | CZE | Kristýna Plíšková | 91 | 2 |
| AUS | Ellen Perez | AUS | Storm Sanders | 116 | 3 |
| ROU | Monica Niculescu | ROU | Raluca Olaru | 116 | 4 |

- ^{1} Rankings are as of March 16, 2020

=== Other entrants ===
The following pairs received wildcards into the doubles main draw:

- (Czech Republic) Linda Fruhvirtová / (Czech Republic) Darja Viďmanová
- (Czech Republic) Miriam Kolodziejová / (Czech Republic) Jesika Malečková

=== Withdrawals ===
During the tournament

- (Romania) Patricia Maria Țig
