= 2020 Prague Open – Doubles =

Doubles
- 2020 Prague Open

Final
- Champions: (Czech Republic) Lucie Hradecká (Czech Republic) Kristýna Plíšková
- Runners-up: (Romania) Monica Niculescu (Romania) Raluca Olaru
- Score: 6–2, 6–2

Details
- Draw: 16
- Seeds: 4

Events
Singles	Doubles
- WTA Prague Open

Anna Kalinskaya and Viktória Kužmová were the defending champions, but chose not to participate.

Lucie Hradecká and Kristýna Plíšková won the title, defeating Monica Niculescu and Raluca Olaru in the final, 6–2, 6–2.

== Seeds ==
1. (Czech Republic) Barbora Krejčíková / (Czech Republic) Kateřina Siniaková (semifinals)
2. (Czech Republic) Lucie Hradecká / (Czech Republic) Kristýna Plíšková (champions)
3. (Australia) Ellen Perez / (Australia) Storm Sanders (first round)
4. (Romania) Monica Niculescu / (Romania) Raluca Olaru (final)

== Draw ==
Key

- Q = Qualifier
- WC = Wild card
- LL = Lucky loser
- Alt = Alternate
- ITF = ITF entry
- PR = Protected ranking
- SR = Special ranking
- SE = Special exempt
- JE = Junior exempt
- JR = Junior Accelerator Programme entrant
- CO = College Accelerator Programme entrant
- NG = Next Gen Accelerator Program entrant
- w/o = Walkover
- r = Retired
- d = Defaulted

=== Draw ===
First round
1	(Czech Republic) B Krejčíková (Czech Republic) K Siniaková	6	3	[10]
(Germany) A-L Friedsam (Romania) LI Paar	4	6	[4]
(Romania) S Halep (Czech Republic) B Strýcová	3	6	[8]
(Russia) V Kudermetova (Russia) A Pavlyuchenkova	6	3	[10]
4	(Romania) M Niculescu (Romania) R Olaru	1	6	[12]
(Norway) U Eikeri (France) E Lechemia	6	3	[10]
(Belarus) L Marozava (Russia) Y Sizikova	w/o
(Romania) A Bogdan (Romania) PM Țig
WC	(Czech Republic) M Kolodziejová (Czech Republic) J Malečková	1	6	[4]
(Netherlands) R van der Hoek (Belgium) Y Wickmayer	6	1	[10]
(Netherlands) A Rus (Slovenia) T Zidanšek	6	6
3	(Australia) E Perez (Australia) S Sanders	3	2
WC	(Czech Republic) L Fruhvirtová (Czech Republic) D Viďmanová	5	2
(Sweden) C Lister (Czech Republic) R Voráčová	7	6
(Germany) T Morderger (Germany) Y Morderger	1	3
2	(Czech Republic) L Hradecká (Czech Republic) Kr Plíšková	6	6

Quarterfinals
1	(Czech Republic) B Krejčíková (Czech Republic) K Siniaková	6	7^{7}
(Russia) V Kudermetova (Russia) A Pavlyuchenkova	1	6^{1}
4	(Romania) M Niculescu (Romania) R Olaru	6	6
(Belarus) L Marozava (Russia) Y Sizikova	2	1
(Netherlands) R van der Hoek (Belgium) Y Wickmayer	4	2
(Netherlands) A Rus (Slovenia) T Zidanšek	6	6
(Sweden) C Lister (Czech Republic) R Voráčová	3	4
2	(Czech Republic) L Hradecká (Czech Republic) Kr Plíšková	6	6

Semifinals
1	(Czech Republic) B Krejčíková (Czech Republic) K Siniaková	6^{4}	7	[5]
4	(Romania) M Niculescu (Romania) R Olaru	7^{7}	5	[10]
(Netherlands) A Rus (Slovenia) T Zidanšek	3	6	[4]
2	(Czech Republic) L Hradecká (Czech Republic) Kr Plíšková	6	3	[10]

Final
4	(Romania) M Niculescu (Romania) R Olaru	2	2
2	(Czech Republic) L Hradecká (Czech Republic) Kr Plíšková	6	6
