= 2013 Kremlin Cup =

- Date: 12–20 October
- Edition: 24th (men) / 18th (women)
- Surface: Hard / indoor
- Location: Moscow, Russia
- Venue: Olympic Stadium

Champions

Men's singles
- (France) Richard Gasquet

Women's singles
- (Romania) Simona Halep

Men's doubles
- (Russia) Mikhail Elgin / (Uzbekistan) Denis Istomin

Women's doubles
- (Russia) Svetlana Kuznetsova / (Australia) Samantha Stosur
| ← 2012 · | Kremlin Cup | · 2014 → |

The 2013 Kremlin Cup was a tennis tournament played on indoor hard courts. It was the 24th edition of the Kremlin Cup for the men (18th edition for the women) and part of the ATP World Tour 250 Series of the 2013 ATP World Tour, and of the Premier Series of the 2013 WTA Tour. It was held at the Olympic Stadium in Moscow, Russia, from 12 October through 20 October 2013. Richard Gasquet and Simona Halep won the singles titles.

== Points and prize money ==
=== Point distribution ===
| Event | W | F | SF | QF | Round of 16 | Round of 32 | Q | Q3 | Q2 | Q1 |
| Men's singles | 250 | 150 | 90 | 45 | 20 | 0 | 12 | 6 | 0 | 0 |
| Men's doubles | 250 | 150 | 90 | 45 | 0 | — | — | — | — | — |
| Women's singles | 470 | 320 | 200 | 120 | 60 | 1 | 20 | 12 | 8 | 1 |
| Women's doubles | 470 | 320 | 200 | 120 | 1 | — | — | — | — | — |

=== Prize money ===
| Event | W | F | SF | QF | Round of 16 | Round of 32 | Q3 | Q2 | Q1 |
| Men's singles | $134,800 | $71,000 | $38,460 | $21,910 | $12,910 | $7,650 | $1,235 | $590 | — |
| Men's doubles * | $40,960 | $21,530 | $11,670 | $6,670 | $3,910 | — | — | — | — |
| Women's singles | $132,470 | $70,728 | $37,780 | $20,303 | $10,886 | $6,912 | $3,099 | $1,647 | $922 |
| Women's doubles * | $41,468 | $22,116 | $12,090 | $6,162 | $3,342 | — | — | — | — |

_{* per team}

== ATP singles main-draw entrants ==
=== Seeds ===
| Country | Player | Rank^{1} | Seed |
|---|---|---|---|
| FRA | Richard Gasquet | 10 | 1 |
| ITA | Andreas Seppi | 22 | 2 |
| SRB | Janko Tipsarević | 24 | 3 |
| UKR | Alexandr Dolgopolov | 34 | 4 |
| UZB | Denis Istomin | 47 | 5 |
| ARG | Horacio Zeballos | 48 | 6 |
| POR | João Sousa | 49 | 7 |
| FRA | Adrian Mannarino | 59 | 8 |

- Rankings are as of October 7, 2013

=== Other entrants ===
The following players received wildcards into the singles main draw:

- (Russia) Teymuraz Gabashvili
- (Russia) Karen Khachanov
- (Russia) Andrey Kuznetsov

The following players received entry from the qualifying draw:

- (Kazakhstan) Andrey Golubev
- (Russia) Aslan Karatsev
- (Kazakhstan) Mikhail Kukushkin
- (Ukraine) Oleksandr Nedovyesov

=== Withdrawals ===
Before the tournament

- (Russia) Nikolay Davydenko (wrist injury)
- (Slovakia) Martin Kližan
- (Chinese Taipei) Lu Yen-hsun
- (Switzerland) Stanislas Wawrinka

=== Retirements ===
- (France) Édouard Roger-Vasselin
- (Italy) Filippo Volandri (right thigh strain)

== ATP doubles main-draw entrants ==
=== Seeds ===
| Country | Player | Country | Player | Rank^{1} | Seed |
|---|---|---|---|---|---|
| BLR | Max Mirnyi | ROU | Horia Tecău | 50 | 1 |
| CZE | František Čermák | SVK | Filip Polášek | 110 | 2 |
| POL | Tomasz Bednarek | ITA | Daniele Bracciali | 112 | 3 |
| SVK | Michal Mertiňák | BRA | André Sá | 134 | 4 |

- ^{1} Rankings are as of October 7, 2013

=== Other entrants ===
The following pairs received wildcards into the doubles main draw:

- (Russia) Victor Baluda / (Russia) Konstantin Kravchuk
- (Russia) Aslan Karatsev / (Russia) Andrey Kuznetsov

The following pair received entry as alternates:

- (Kazakhstan) Andrey Golubev / (Argentina) Horacio Zeballos

=== Withdrawals ===
Before the tournament

- (Spain) Albert Ramos (food poisoning)

== WTA singles main-draw entrants ==
=== Seeds ===
| Country | Player | Rank^{1} | Seed |
|---|---|---|---|
| ~~GER~~ | ~~Angelique Kerber~~ | ~~10~~ | ~~1~~ |
| ITA | Roberta Vinci | 11 | 2 |
| RUS | Maria Kirilenko | 15 | 3 |
| SRB | Ana Ivanovic | 16 | 4 |
| ROU | Simona Halep | 17 | 5 |
| ESP | Carla Suárez Navarro | 18 | 6 |
| AUS | Samantha Stosur | 20 | 7 |
| RUS | Svetlana Kuznetsova | 22 | 8 |
| SVK | Dominika Cibulková | 23 | 9 |

- Rankings are as of October 7, 2013

=== Other entrants ===
The following players received wildcards into the singles main draw:

- (Russia) Alisa Kleybanova
- (Russia) Ksenia Pervak

The following players received entry from the qualifying draw:

- (Sweden) Sofia Arvidsson
- (Serbia) Vesna Dolonc
- (Montenegro) Danka Kovinić
- (Spain) Arantxa Parra Santonja

The following player received entry as a lucky loser:

- (Russia) Vera Dushevina

=== Withdrawals ===
Before the tournament

- (Italy) Sara Errani (low back injury)
- (Serbia) Jelena Janković (back injury)
- (Germany) Angelique Kerber (abdominal strain)
- (Czech Republic) Petra Kvitová (back injury)
- (Russia) Ekaterina Makarova (right wrist injury)
- (Poland) Urszula Radwańska

=== Retirements ===
- (Slovakia) Magdaléna Rybáriková (upper respiratory infection)

== WTA doubles main-draw entrants ==
=== Seeds ===
| Country | Player | Country | Player | Rank^{1} | Seed |
|---|---|---|---|---|---|
| SVK | Daniela Hantuchová | RUS | Elena Vesnina | 54 | 1 |
| RUS | Alla Kudryavtseva | AUS | Anastasia Rodionova | 68 | 2 |
| RUS | Vera Dushevina | ESP | Arantxa Parra Santonja | 72 | 3 |
| USA | Liezel Huber | POL | Alicja Rosolska | 77 | 4 |

- ^{1} Rankings are as of October 7, 2013

=== Other entrants ===
The following pair received wildcard into the doubles main draw:

- (Russia) Anastasia Bukhanko / (Russia) Margarita Gasparyan

=== Retirements ===
- (Slovakia) Daniela Hantuchová (right foot injury)

== Finals ==
=== Men's singles ===
- (France) Richard Gasquet defeated (Kazakhstan) Mikhail Kukushkin, 4–6, 6–4, 6–4

=== Women's singles ===
- (Romania) Simona Halep defeated (Australia) Samantha Stosur, 7–6^{(7–1)}, 6–2

=== Men's doubles ===
- (Russia) Mikhail Elgin / (Uzbekistan) Denis Istomin defeated (United Kingdom) Ken Skupski / (United Kingdom) Neal Skupski, 6–2, 1–6, [14–12]

=== Women's doubles ===
- (Russia) Svetlana Kuznetsova / (Australia) Samantha Stosur defeated (Russia) Alla Kudryavtseva / (Australia) Anastasia Rodionova, 6–1, 1–6, [10–8]
