= 2012 Kremlin Cup – Women's singles =

Women's singles
- 2012 Kremlin Cup

Final
- Champion: (Denmark) Caroline Wozniacki
- Runner-up: (Australia) Samantha Stosur
- Score: 6–2, 4–6, 7–5

Details
- Seeds: 8

Events
Singles	men	women
Doubles	men	women
- Kremlin Cup

Dominika Cibulková was the defending champion, but she was defeated in the quarterfinals by Caroline Wozniacki.

Wozniacki went on to win the title, defeating Samantha Stosur in the final 6–2, 4–6, 7–5.

== Seeds ==
The top four seeds received a bye into the second round.

1. (Australia) Samantha Stosur (final)
2. (France) Marion Bartoli (second round)
3. (Denmark) Caroline Wozniacki (champion)
4. (Serbia) Ana Ivanovic (semifinals)
5. (Slovakia) Dominika Cibulková (quarterfinals)
6. (Russia) Nadia Petrova (first round)
7. (Russia) Maria Kirilenko (quarterfinals)
8. (Czech Republic) Lucie Šafářová (second round)

== Draw ==
Key

- Q = Qualifier
- WC = Wild card
- LL = Lucky loser
- Alt = Alternate
- ITF = ITF entry
- PR = Protected ranking
- SR = Special ranking
- SE = Special exempt
- JE = Junior exempt
- JR = Junior Accelerator Programme entrant
- CO = College Accelerator Programme entrant
- NG = Next Gen Accelerator Program entrant
- w/o = Walkover
- r = Retired
- d = Defaulted

=== Finals ===
Semifinals
1	(Australia) Samantha Stosur	2	6	6
4	(Serbia) Ana Ivanovic	6	3	2
3/WC	(Denmark) Caroline Wozniacki	6	6^{4}	6
(Sweden) Sofia Arvidsson	3	7^{7}	4

Final
1	(Australia) Samantha Stosur	2	6	5
3/WC	(Denmark) Caroline Wozniacki	6	4	7

=== Top half ===
First round
Q	(Australia) A Rodionova	4	3
(France) A Cornet	6	6
(Czech Republic) K Zakopalová	6	6
(Romania) A Cadanțu	3	3
WC	(Russia) M Gasparyan	3	6	2
8	(Czech Republic) L Šafářová	6	4	6
Q	(Russia) V Solovieva	6	6
Q	(Ukraine) E Svitolina	4	2
(Kazakhstan) G Voskoboeva	6	1	4
Q	(Serbia) V Dolonc	1	6	6
(Romania) S Halep	3	7	7
6	(Russia) N Petrova	6	5	5

Second round
1	(Australia) S Stosur	7^{8}	7
(France) A Cornet	6^{6}	5
(Czech Republic) K Zakopalová	6	6
8	(Czech Republic) L Šafářová	4	4
4	(Serbia) A Ivanovic	6	6
Q	(Russia) V Solovieva	1	4
Q	(Serbia) V Dolonc	6	6
(Romania) S Halep	1	0

Quarterfinals
1	(Australia) S Stosur	6	6
(Czech Republic) K Zakopalová	1	3
4	(Serbia) A Ivanovic	6	6
Q	(Serbia) V Dolonc	4	1

Semifinals
1	(Australia) S Stosur	2	6	6
4	(Serbia) A Ivanovic	6	3	2

=== Bottom half ===
First round
5	(Slovakia) D Cibulková	2	6	6
(Russia) E Makarova	6	4	2
(Bulgaria) T Pironkova	6	7^{7}
(United States) V Lepchenko	0	6^{3}
(Italy) F Schiavone	3	1
(Poland) U Radwańska	6	6
7	(Russia) M Kirilenko	7	6
WC	(Russia) E Vesnina	5	1
(Kazakhstan) Y Shvedova	6	6
(Russia) A Pavlyuchenkova	2	2
(Serbia) B Jovanovski	2	4
(Sweden) S Arvidsson	6	6

Second round
5	(Slovakia) D Cibulková	6	6
(Bulgaria) T Pironkova	2	3
(Poland) U Radwańska	1	3
3/WC	(Denmark) C Wozniacki	6	6
7	(Russia) M Kirilenko	7	6
(Kazakhstan) Y Shvedova	5	4
(Sweden) S Arvidsson	6	6
2	(France) M Bartoli	3	0

Quarterfinals
5	(Slovakia) D Cibulková	2	7^{7}	1
3/WC	(Denmark) C Wozniacki	6	6^{1}	6
7	(Russia) M Kirilenko	3	3
(Sweden) S Arvidsson	6	6

Semifinals
3/WC	(Denmark) C Wozniacki	6	6^{4}	6
(Sweden) S Arvidsson	3	7^{7}	4

== Qualifying ==
=== Seeds ===
1. (Kazakhstan) Sesil Karatantcheva (first round)
2. (Russia) Olga Puchkova (qualifying competition, retired)
3. (Ukraine) Lesia Tsurenko (first round)
4. (Slovakia) Jana Čepelová (second round)
5. (Spain) María-Teresa Torró-Flor (qualifying competition)
6. (Czech Republic) Kristýna Plíšková (qualifying competition)
7. (Czech Republic) Karolína Plíšková (second round)
8. (Australia) Anastasia Rodionova (qualified)

=== Qualifiers ===
1. (Russia) Valeria Solovieva
2. (Australia) Anastasia Rodionova
3. (Serbia) Vesna Dolonc
4. (Ukraine) Elina Svitolina

=== Draw ===
==== First qualifier ====
First round
1	(Kazakhstan) Sesil Karatantcheva	2	3
(Russia) Valeria Solovieva	6	6
WC	(Russia) Elizaveta Kulichkova	4	6	4
(Ukraine) Irina Buryachok	6	1	6
WC	(Estonia) Anett Kontaveit	2	2
(Ukraine) Nadiya Kichenok	6	6
(Ukraine) Lyudmyla Kichenok	2	3
6	(Czech Republic) Kristýna Plíšková	6	6

Second round
(Russia) Valeria Solovieva	6	6
(Ukraine) Irina Buryachok	4	2
(Ukraine) Nadiya Kichenok	4	6	2
6	(Czech Republic) Kristýna Plíšková	6	1	6

Qualifying competition
(Russia) Valeria Solovieva	6	3	7^{7}
6	(Czech Republic) Kristýna Plíšková	4	6	6^{3}

==== Second qualifier ====
First round
2	(Russia) Olga Puchkova	6	6
WC	(Latvia) Jeļena Ostapenko	4	1
(Russia) Daria Gavrilova	6	3	6
(Ukraine) Kateryna Kozlova	2	6	4
(Russia) Ekaterina Bychkova	6	6
(Kyrgyzstan) Ksenia Palkina	2	3
(Georgia (country)) Sofia Shapatava	3	2
8	(Australia) Anastasia Rodionova	6	6

Second round
2	(Russia) Olga Puchkova	7	2	6
(Russia) Daria Gavrilova	5	6	4
(Russia) Ekaterina Bychkova	4	7^{7}	4
8	(Australia) Anastasia Rodionova	6	6^{5}	6

Qualifying competition
2	(Russia) Olga Puchkova	0	0^{r}
8	(Australia) Anastasia Rodionova	6	3

==== Third qualifier ====
First round
3	(Ukraine) Lesia Tsurenko	7	4	4
(Serbia) Vesna Dolonc	5	6	6
(Belarus) Polina Pekhova	6	0
(Belarus) Darya Kustova	4	1^{r}
(Russia) Marta Sirotkina	4	2
(Germany) Kathrin Wörle	6	6
WC	(Russia) Mayya Katsitadze	4	2
5	(Spain) María-Teresa Torró-Flor	6	6

Second round
(Serbia) Vesna Dolonc	6	6
(Belarus) Polina Pekhova	2	1
(Germany) Kathrin Wörle	3	3
5	(Spain) María-Teresa Torró-Flor	6	6

Qualifying competition
(Serbia) Vesna Dolonc	2	6	6
5	(Spain) María-Teresa Torró-Flor	6	4	2

==== Fourth qualifier ====
First round
4	(Slovakia) Jana Čepelová	6	4	6
(United States) Jill Craybas	4	6	2
(Bulgaria) Dia Evtimova	0^{r}
(Ukraine) Elina Svitolina	5
(Ukraine) Olga Savchuk	2	2
(Italy) Maria Elena Camerin	6	6
(Argentina) Paula Ormaechea	6	3	1
7	(Czech Republic) Karolína Plíšková	0	6	6

Second round
4	(Slovakia) Jana Čepelová	4	6	3
(Ukraine) Elina Svitolina	6	3	6
(Italy) Maria Elena Camerin	6	3	6
7	(Czech Republic) Karolína Plíšková	4	6	2

Qualifying competition
(Ukraine) Elina Svitolina	7^{7}	3	6
(Italy) Maria Elena Camerin	6^{5}	6	4
