= 2013 Kremlin Cup – Men's doubles =

Men's doubles
- 2013 Kremlin Cup

Final
- Champions: (Russia) Mikhail Elgin (Uzbekistan) Denis Istomin
- Runners-up: (United Kingdom) Ken Skupski (United Kingdom) Neal Skupski
- Score: 6–2, 1–6, [14–12]

Details
- Draw: 16
- Seeds: 4

Events
Singles	men	women
Doubles	men	women
← 2012 ·	Kremlin Cup	· 2014 →

František Čermák and Michal Mertiňák were the defending champion, but they decided not to participate together. Čermák played alongside Filip Polášek, but lost in the first round to Rameez Junaid and Philipp Marx. Mertiňák teamed up with André Sá, but lost in the quarterfinals to Victor Baluda and Konstantin Kravchuk.
Mikhail Elgin and Denis Istomin won the title, defeating Ken Skupski and Neal Skupski in the final, 6–2, 1–6, [14–12].

== Seeds ==
1. (Belarus) Max Mirnyi / (Romania) Horia Tecău (quarterfinals)
2. (Czech Republic) František Čermák / (Slovakia) Filip Polášek (first round)
3. (Poland) Tomasz Bednarek / (Italy) Daniele Bracciali (first round)
4. (Slovakia) Michal Mertiňák / (Brazil) André Sá (quarterfinals)

== Draw ==
=== Key ===
- Q = Qualifier
- WC = Wild card
- LL = Lucky loser
- Alt = Alternate
- SE = Special exempt
- PR = Protected ranking
- ITF = ITF entry
- JE = Junior exempt
- w/o = Walkover
- r = Retired
- d = Defaulted
- SR = Special ranking

=== Draw ===
First round
1	(Belarus) M Mirnyi (Romania) H Tecău	7^{7}	6
(Italy) P Lorenzi (Italy) A Seppi	6^{5}	2
Alt	(Kazakhstan) A Golubev (Argentina) H Zeballos	4	3
(United Kingdom) K Skupski (United Kingdom) N Skupski	6	6
4	(Slovakia) M Mertiňák (Brazil) A Sá	7^{7}	6^{2}	[10]
(Croatia) M Draganja (Croatia) F Škugor	6^{5}	7^{7}	[6]
WC	(Russia) V Baluda (Russia) K Kravchuk	7	6
WC	(Russia) A Karatsev (Russia) A Kuznetsov	5	1
(Russia) A Bogomolov Jr. (Israel) D Sela	6	3	[10]
(India) P Raja (India) D Sharan	4	6	[5]
(Russia) M Elgin (Uzbekistan) D Istomin	6	6
3	(Poland) T Bednarek (Italy) D Bracciali	3	3
(Croatia) I Karlović (Germany) F Moser	4	6	[10]
(Ukraine) A Dolgopolov (Ukraine) S Stakhovsky	6	3	[8]
(Australia) R Junaid (Germany) P Marx	6	6^{7}	[10]
2	(Czech Republic) F Čermák (Slovakia) F Polášek	2	7^{9}	[2]

Quarterfinals
1	(Belarus) M Mirnyi (Romania) H Tecău	6^{7}	1
(United Kingdom) K Skupski (United Kingdom) N Skupski	7^{9}	6
4	(Slovakia) M Mertiňák (Brazil) A Sá	1	6	[6]
WC	(Russia) V Baluda (Russia) K Kravchuk	6	4	[10]
(Russia) A Bogomolov Jr. (Israel) D Sela	5	2
(Russia) M Elgin (Uzbekistan) D Istomin	7	6
(Croatia) I Karlović (Germany) F Moser	5	4
(Australia) R Junaid (Germany) P Marx	7	6

Semifinals
(United Kingdom) K Skupski (United Kingdom) N Skupski	6	5	[10]
WC	(Russia) V Baluda (Russia) K Kravchuk	3	7	[7]
(Russia) M Elgin (Uzbekistan) D Istomin	7	3	[10]
(Australia) R Junaid (Germany) P Marx	5	6	[5]

Final
(United Kingdom) K Skupski (United Kingdom) N Skupski	2	6	[12]
(Russia) M Elgin (Uzbekistan) D Istomin	6	1	[14]
