= 2012 Kremlin Cup – Men's doubles =

Men's doubles
- 2012 Kremlin Cup

Final
- Champions: (Czech Republic) František Čermák (Slovakia) Michal Mertiňák
- Runners-up: (Italy) Simone Bolelli (Italy) Daniele Bracciali
- Score: 7–5, 6–3

Details
- Draw: 16
- Seeds: 4

Events
Singles	men	women
Doubles	men	women
← 2011 ·	Kremlin Cup	· 2013 →

František Čermák and Filip Polášek were the defending champions but Polášek decided not to participate.
Čermák plays alongside Michal Mertiňák and won the title, defeating Simone Bolelli and Daniele Bracciali 7–5, 6–3 in the final.

== Seeds ==
1. (Czech Republic) František Čermák / (Slovakia) Michal Mertiňák (champions)
2. (Russia) Mikhail Elgin / (Uzbekistan) Denis Istomin (first round)
3. (Argentina) Carlos Berlocq / (Russia) Alex Bogomolov Jr. (semifinals)
4. (Australia) Rameez Junaid / (United States) Rajeev Ram (first round)

== Draw ==
=== Key ===
- Q = Qualifier
- WC = Wild card
- LL = Lucky loser
- Alt = Alternate
- SE = Special exempt
- PR = Protected ranking
- ITF = ITF entry
- JE = Junior exempt
- w/o = Walkover
- r = Retired
- d = Defaulted
- SR = Special ranking

=== Draw ===
First round
1	(Czech Republic) F Čermák (Slovakia) M Mertiňák	6	6
WC	(Russia) T Gabashvili (Russia) A Kuznetsov	3	1
(Croatia) I Karlović (Germany) F Moser	6	6^{4}	[10]
(United States) J Cerretani (Romania) V Hănescu	4	7^{7}	[8]
4	(Australia) R Junaid (United States) R Ram	6^{9}	3
WC	(Russia) E Donskoy (Russia) I Kunitsyn	7^{11}	6
(Germany) B Becker (Germany) B Phau	6^{6}	5
(Spain) R Bautista-Agut (Netherlands) I Sijsling	7^{8}	7
(Brazil) T Bellucci (Japan) T Ito	7^{7}	6
(Spain) D Gimeno-Traver (Czech Republic) L Rosol	6^{5}	3
(Czech Republic) L Dlouhý (Ukraine) A Dolgopolov	7^{7}	3	[5]
3	(Argentina) C Berlocq (Russia) A Bogomolov Jr.	6^{2}	6	[10]
(Italy) F Cipolla (Italy) A Seppi	6	6
(Tunisia) M Jaziri (France) É Roger-Vasselin	4	3
(Italy) S Bolelli (Italy) D Bracciali	7^{7}	6
2	(Russia) M Elgin (Uzbekistan) D Istomin	6^{5}	4

Quarterfinals
1	(Czech Republic) F Čermák (Slovakia) M Mertiňák	6^{5}	6	[13]
(Croatia) I Karlović (Germany) F Moser	7^{7}	3	[11]
WC	(Russia) E Donskoy (Russia) I Kunitsyn	6	3	[10]
(Spain) R Bautista-Agut (Netherlands) I Sijsling	3	6	[6]
(Brazil) T Bellucci (Japan) T Ito	2	5
3	(Argentina) C Berlocq (Russia) A Bogomolov Jr.	6	7
(Italy) F Cipolla (Italy) A Seppi	6^{4}	6	[4]
(Italy) S Bolelli (Italy) D Bracciali	7^{7}	4	[10]

Semifinals
1	(Czech Republic) F Čermák (Slovakia) M Mertiňák	6	6
WC	(Russia) E Donskoy (Russia) I Kunitsyn	3	4
3	(Argentina) C Berlocq (Russia) A Bogomolov Jr.	1	4
(Italy) S Bolelli (Italy) D Bracciali	6	6

Final
1	(Czech Republic) F Čermák (Slovakia) M Mertiňák	7	6
(Italy) S Bolelli (Italy) D Bracciali	5	3
