= 2012 Kremlin Cup – Women's doubles =

Women's doubles
- 2012 Kremlin Cup

Final
- Champions: (Russia) Ekaterina Makarova (Russia) Elena Vesnina
- Runners-up: (Russia) Maria Kirilenko (Russia) Nadia Petrova
- Score: 6–3, 1–6, [10–8]

Details
- Seeds: 4

Events
Singles	men	women
Doubles	men	women
← 2011 ·	Kremlin Cup	· 2013 →

Vania King and Yaroslava Shvedova were the defending champions, but King decided not to participate. Shvedova played alongside Katarina Srebotnik, but they lost in the semifinals to Ekaterina Makarova and Elena Vesnina.
Makarova and Vesnina won the final 6–3, 1–6, [10–8] against Maria Kirilenko and Nadia Petrova.

== Seeds ==
1. (Russia) Ekaterina Makarova / (Russia) Elena Vesnina (champions)
2. (Russia) Maria Kirilenko / (Russia) Nadia Petrova (final)
3. (Spain) Nuria Llagostera Vives / (India) Sania Mirza (quarterfinals)
4. (Kazakhstan) Yaroslava Shvedova / (Slovenia) Katarina Srebotnik (semifinals)

== Draw ==
=== Key ===
- Q = Qualifier
- WC = Wild card
- LL = Lucky loser
- Alt = Alternate
- SE = Special exempt
- PR = Protected ranking
- ITF = ITF entry
- JE = Junior exempt
- w/o = Walkover
- r = Retired
- d = Defaulted
- SR = Special ranking

=== Draw ===
First round
1	(Russia) E Makarova (Russia) E Vesnina	6	6
(South Africa) N Grandin (Czech Republic) V Uhlířová	0	4
WC	(Russia) A Frolova (Russia) M Gasparyan	1	0
(Australia) A Rodionova (Kazakhstan) G Voskoboeva	6	6
4	(Kazakhstan) Y Shvedova (Slovenia) K Srebotnik	7	2	[10]
(Russia) A Pavlyuchenkova (Czech Republic) L Šafářová	5	6	[5]
(United States) J Craybas (Czech Republic) E Hrdinová	3	4
(Croatia) D Jurak (Hungary) K Marosi	6	6
(United States) R Kops-Jones (United States) A Spears	6	1	[11]
(Germany) A-L Grönefeld (Czech Republic) K Peschke	3	6	[9]
(Belarus) D Kustova (Ukraine) O Savchuk	3	7	[6]
3	(Spain) N Llagostera Vives (India) S Mirza	6	5	[10]
(United States) L Lee-Waters (United States) M Moulton-Levy	7^{9}	6^{5}	[10]
(France) A Cornet (Poland) A Rosolska	6^{7}	7^{7}	[5]
(Czech Republic) Ka Plíšková (Czech Republic) Kr Plíšková	4	6	[9]
2	(Russia) M Kirilenko (Russia) N Petrova	6	4	[11]

Quarterfinals
1	(Russia) E Makarova (Russia) E Vesnina	6	6
(Australia) A Rodionova (Kazakhstan) G Voskoboeva	4	4
4	(Kazakhstan) Y Shvedova (Slovenia) K Srebotnik	6	7
(Croatia) D Jurak (Hungary) K Marosi	3	5
(United States) R Kops-Jones (United States) A Spears	7	6
3	(Spain) N Llagostera Vives (India) S Mirza	5	4
(United States) L Lee-Waters (United States) M Moulton-Levy	1	6	[7]
2	(Russia) M Kirilenko (Russia) N Petrova	6	3	[10]

Semifinals
1	(Russia) E Makarova (Russia) E Vesnina	6	6
4	(Kazakhstan) Y Shvedova (Slovenia) K Srebotnik	3	4
(United States) R Kops-Jones (United States) A Spears	5	4
2	(Russia) M Kirilenko (Russia) N Petrova	7	6

Final
1	(Russia) E Makarova (Russia) E Vesnina	6	1	[10]
2	(Russia) M Kirilenko (Russia) N Petrova	3	6	[8]
