= 2013 Kremlin Cup – Women's singles =

Women's singles
- 2013 Kremlin Cup

Final
- Champion: (Romania) Simona Halep
- Runner-up: (Australia) Samantha Stosur
- Score: 7–6^{(7–1)}, 6–2

Details
- Seeds: 8

Events
Singles	men	women
Doubles	men	women
- Kremlin Cup

Caroline Wozniacki was the defending champion, but she chose to participate in Luxembourg instead.

Simona Halep won the title, defeating Samantha Stosur in the final, 7–6^{(7–1)}, 6–2.

== Seeds ==
The first four seeds received a bye into the second round.

1. (Germany) Angelique Kerber (withdrew because of an abdominal strain)
2. (Italy) Roberta Vinci (quarterfinals)
3. (Russia) Maria Kirilenko (second round)
4. (Serbia) Ana Ivanovic (quarterfinals)
5. (Romania) Simona Halep (champion)
6. (Spain) Carla Suárez Navarro (second round)
7. (Australia) Samantha Stosur (final)
8. (Russia) Svetlana Kuznetsova (semifinals)
9. (Slovakia) Dominika Cibulková (first round)

== Draw ==
Key

- Q = Qualifier
- WC = Wild card
- LL = Lucky loser
- Alt = Alternate
- ITF = ITF entry
- PR = Protected ranking
- SR = Special ranking
- SE = Special exempt
- JE = Junior exempt
- JR = Junior Accelerator Programme entrant
- CO = College Accelerator Programme entrant
- NG = Next Gen Accelerator Program entrant
- w/o = Walkover
- r = Retired
- d = Defaulted

=== Finals ===
Semifinals
(Russia) Anastasia Pavlyuchenkova	2	1
5	(Romania) Simona Halep	6	6
7	(Australia) Samantha Stosur	6	6
8	(Russia) Svetlana Kuznetsova	2	4

Final
5	(Romania) Simona Halep	7^{7}	6
7	(Australia) Samantha Stosur	6^{1}	2

=== Top half ===
First round
(Russia) A Pavlyuchenkova	6	6
(France) C Garcia	0	3
Q	(Spain) A Parra Santonja	1	2
(Slovakia) D Hantuchová	6	6
Q	(Serbia) V Dolonc	3	7	6
9	(Slovakia) D Cibulková	6	5	3
(Slovakia) M Rybáriková	7	6
WC	(Russia) K Pervak	5	2
(United States) V Lepchenko	7^{8}	4	4
WC	(Russia) A Kleybanova	6^{6}	6	6
LL	(Russia) V Dushevina	4	3
6	(Spain) C Suárez Navarro	6	6

Second round
3	(Russia) M Kirilenko	3	3
(Russia) A Pavlyuchenkova	6	6
(Slovakia) D Hantuchová	3	6	6
Q	(Serbia) V Dolonc	6	4	4
5	(Romania) S Halep	6	0
(Slovakia) M Rybáriková	2	0^{r}
WC	(Russia) A Kleybanova	7^{7}	6
6	(Spain) C Suárez Navarro	6^{2}	4

Quarterfinals
(Russia) A Pavlyuchenkova	6	6
(Slovakia) D Hantuchová	0	4
5	(Romania) S Halep	6	6
WC	(Russia) A Kleybanova	1	1

Semifinals
(Russia) A Pavlyuchenkova	2	1
5	(Romania) S Halep	6	6

=== Bottom half ===
First round
7	(Australia) S Stosur	6	6
(Estonia) K Kanepi	3	1
(Ukraine) E Svitolina	5	3
(France) A Cornet	7	6
Q	(Montenegro) D Kovinić	4	3
(Czech Republic) K Zakopalová	6	6
8	(Russia) S Kuznetsova	7	6
(Ukraine) L Tsurenko	5	2
Q	(Sweden) S Arvidsson	0	6	6
(Kazakhstan) G Voskoboeva	6	1	3
(Russia) E Vesnina	6	6
(Kazakhstan) Y Shvedova	1	2

Second round
7	(Australia) S Stosur	6	6
(France) A Cornet	4	1
(Czech Republic) K Zakopalová	3	1
4	(Serbia) A Ivanovic	6	6
8	(Russia) S Kuznetsova	6	7
Q	(Sweden) S Arvidsson	2	5
(Russia) E Vesnina	6	1	4
2	(Italy) R Vinci	2	6	6

Quarterfinals
7	(Australia) S Stosur	7	6
4	(Serbia) A Ivanovic	5	4
8	(Russia) S Kuznetsova	6	6
2	(Italy) R Vinci	2	3

Semifinals
7	(Australia) S Stosur	6	6
8	(Russia) S Kuznetsova	2	4

== Qualifying ==
=== Seeds ===
1. (Serbia) Vesna Dolonc (qualified)
2. (United States) Vania King (second round)
3. (Sweden) Sofia Arvidsson (qualified)
4. (Spain) Estrella Cabeza Candela (first round)
5. (Russia) Vera Dushevina (qualifying competition, lucky loser)
6. (Russia) Olga Puchkova (first round)
7. (Russia) Daria Gavrilova (first round)
8. (Russia) Alexandra Panova (qualifying competition)

=== Qualifiers ===
1. (Serbia) Vesna Dolonc
2. (Spain) Arantxa Parra Santonja
3. (Sweden) Sofia Arvidsson
4. (Montenegro) Danka Kovinić

=== Lucky losers ===
1. (Russia) Vera Dushevina

=== Qualifying draw ===
==== First qualifier ====
First round
1	(Serbia) Vesna Dolonc	6	6
(Slovakia) Michaela Hončová	1	3
(Russia) Valeria Solovyeva	5	2
WC	(Russia) Evgeniya Rodina	7	6
(Australia) Anastasia Rodionova	6	1	2
(Italy) Maria Elena Camerin	4	6	6
(Russia) Ekaterina Bychkova	6	2	1
8	(Russia) Alexandra Panova	4	6	6

Second round
1	(Serbia) Vesna Dolonc	6	7^{7}
WC	(Russia) Evgeniya Rodina	0	6^{2}
(Italy) Maria Elena Camerin	0	6^{2}
8	(Russia) Alexandra Panova	6	7^{7}

Qualifying competition
1	(Serbia) Vesna Dolonc	5	7	6
8	(Russia) Alexandra Panova	7	5	4

==== Second qualifier ====
First round
2	(United States) Vania King	6	6
(Belarus) Ilona Kremen	4	1
(Russia) Valeria Savinykh	4	6	6^{8}
(Spain) Arantxa Parra Santonja	6	1	7^{10}
WC	(Russia) Daria Kasatkina	1	5
(Poland) Paula Kania	6	7
(Ukraine) Valentyna Ivakhnenko	6	6
7	(Russia) Daria Gavrilova	3	3

Second round
2	(United States) Vania King	3	6^{4}
(Spain) Arantxa Parra Santonja	6	7^{7}
(Poland) Paula Kania	4	6^{2}
(Ukraine) Valentyna Ivakhnenko	6	7^{7}

Qualifying competition
(Spain) Arantxa Parra Santonja	6	6
(Ukraine) Valentyna Ivakhnenko	2	2

==== Third qualifier ====
First round
3	(Sweden) Sofia Arvidsson	6	6
WC	(Russia) Elizaveta Kulichkova	3	1
(Russia) Irina Khromacheva	3	2
(Ukraine) Anastasiya Vasylyeva	6	6
(Ukraine) Yuliya Beygelzimer	6	6
(Ukraine) Kateryna Kozlova	2	1
(Uzbekistan) Nigina Abduraimova	2	1
5	(Russia) Vera Dushevina	6	6

Second round
3	(Sweden) Sofia Arvidsson	6	6
(Ukraine) Anastasiya Vasylyeva	0	1
(Ukraine) Yuliya Beygelzimer	0	1
5	(Russia) Vera Dushevina	6	6

Qualifying competition
3	(Sweden) Sofia Arvidsson	6	4	6
5	(Russia) Vera Dushevina	3	6	3

==== Fourth qualifier ====
First round
4	(Spain) Estrella Cabeza Candela	2	0
(Montenegro) Danka Kovinić	6	6
(Ukraine) Olga Savchuk	2	1
WC	(Russia) Margarita Gasparyan	6	6
(Croatia) Tereza Mrdeža	6	6
(Switzerland) Amra Sadiković	3	4
(Russia) Alla Kudryavtseva	2	6	6
6	(Russia) Olga Puchkova	6	3	2

Second round
(Montenegro) Danka Kovinić	6	6
WC	(Russia) Margarita Gasparyan	3	4
(Croatia) Tereza Mrdeža	7^{7}	4	6
(Russia) Alla Kudryavtseva	6^{5}	6	3

Qualifying competition
(Montenegro) Danka Kovinić	6	3	6
(Croatia) Tereza Mrdeža	4	6	2
