= Anastasia Bukhanko =

Russian tennis player

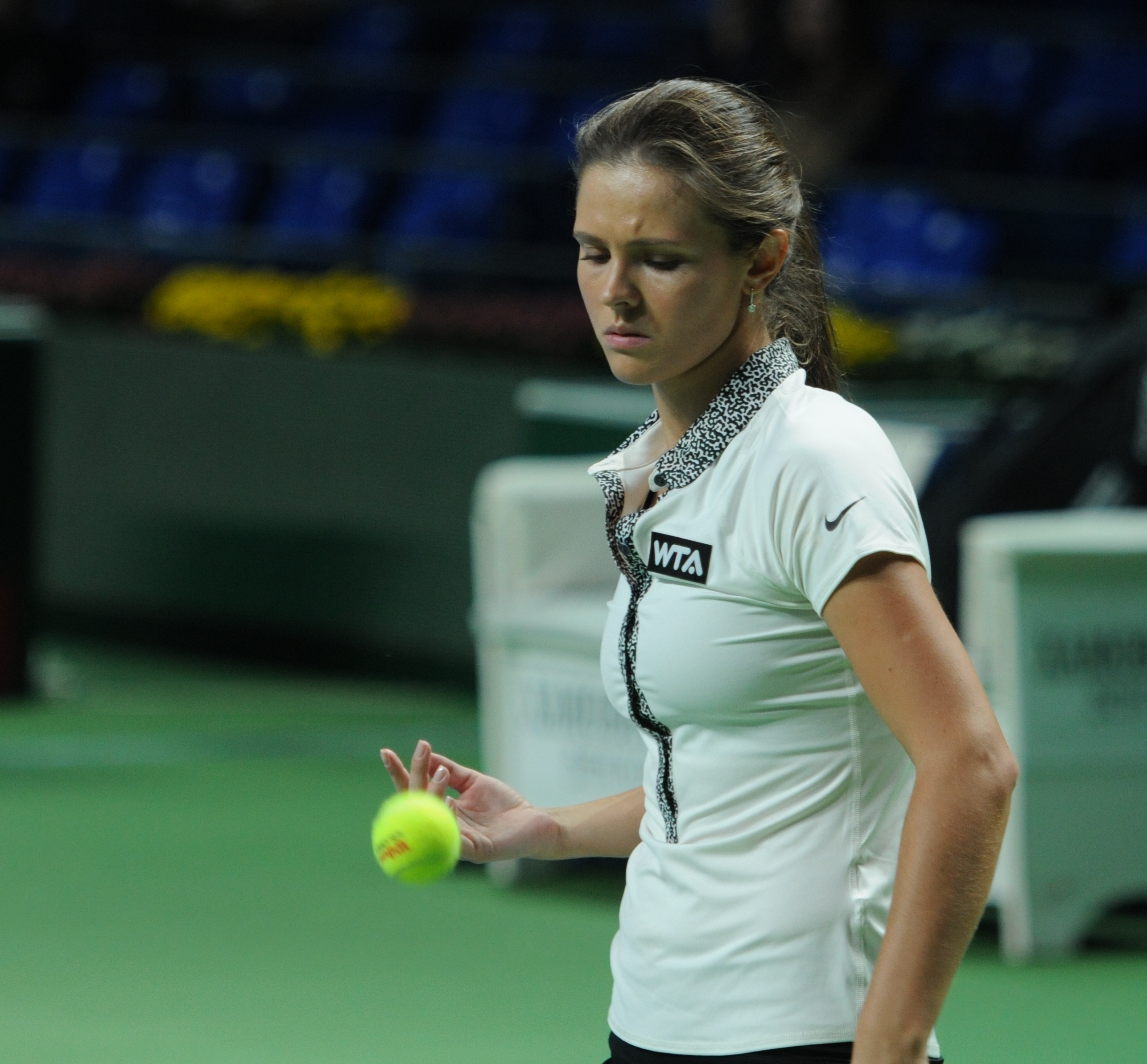
- Full name: Anastasia Vladimirovna Bukhanko
- Native name: Анастасия Буханко
- Country (sports): Russia
- Born: 6 June 1990 (age 34); Russia
- Plays: Left-handed
- Prize money: $14,716

Singles
- Career record: 1–41
- Career titles: 0
- Highest ranking: No. 1096 (6 April 2015)

Doubles
- Career record: 9–37
- Career titles: 0
- Highest ranking: No. 805 (21 March 2016)
- Last updated on: 1 February 2017.

Anastasia Vladimirovna Bukhanko (Russian: Анастасия Владимировна Буханко; born 6 June 1990) is a Russian tennis player.

Bukhanko has a career high WTA singles ranking of 1096 achieved on 6 April 2015 and a doubles ranking of 805 achieved on 21 March 2016.

Bukhanko made her WTA main draw debut at the 2013 Kremlin Cup in the doubles draw partnering Margarita Gasparyan.
