= 2020 Prague Open – Singles =

Singles
- 2020 Prague Open

Final
- Champion: (Romania) Simona Halep
- Runner-up: (Belgium) Elise Mertens
- Score: 6–2, 7–5

Details
- Draw: 32
- Seeds: 8

Events
Singles	Doubles
- WTA Prague Open

Jil Teichmann was the defending champion, but chose to participate in Lexington instead.

Simona Halep won the title, defeating Elise Mertens in the final, 6–2, 7–5. Halep subsequently jumped into the Vltava.

== Seeds ==
1. (Romania) Simona Halep (champion)
2. (Croatia) Petra Martić (second round)
3. (Belgium) Elise Mertens (final)
4. (Ukraine) ~~Dayana Yastremska~~ (withdrew)
5. (Russia) Ekaterina Alexandrova (first round)
6. (Russia) Anastasia Pavlyuchenkova (first round)
7. (Czech Republic) Barbora Strýcová (first round)
8. (Russia) Veronika Kudermetova (first round)
9. (Latvia) Anastasija Sevastova (first round)

== Draw ==
Key

- Q = Qualifier
- WC = Wild card
- LL = Lucky loser
- Alt = Alternate
- ITF = ITF entry
- PR = Protected ranking
- SR = Special ranking
- SE = Special exempt
- JE = Junior exempt
- JR = Junior Accelerator Programme entrant
- CO = College Accelerator Programme entrant
- NG = Next Gen Accelerator Program entrant
- w/o = Walkover
- r = Retired
- d = Defaulted

=== Finals ===
Semifinals
1	(Romania) Simona Halep	7^{7}	6
(Romania) Irina-Camelia Begu	6^{2}	3
3	(Belgium) Elise Mertens	7	7^{7}
(Czech Republic) Kristýna Plíšková	5	6^{4}

Final
1	(Romania) Simona Halep	6	7
3	(Belgium) Elise Mertens	2	5

=== Top half ===
First round
1	(Romania) S Halep	6	1	7^{7}
(Slovenia) P Hercog	1	6	6^{3}
(Romania) PM Țig	4	3
WC	(Czech Republic) B Krejčíková	6	6
LL	(Poland) M Fręch	7^{10}	6
Q	(Romania) E-G Ruse	6^{8}	3
(Netherlands) A Rus	7	6
6	(Russia) A Pavlyuchenkova	5	2
9	(Latvia) A Sevastova	2	2
(Romania) I-C Begu	6	6
(Spain) A Bolsova	4	3
LL	(Switzerland) L Küng	6	6
(Germany) L Siegemund	4	6	6
Q	(Egypt) M Sherif	6	0	1
(Spain) S Sorribes Tormo	7^{7}	6
7	(Czech Republic) B Strýcová	6^{3}	1

Second round
1	(Romania) S Halep	3	7	6
WC	(Czech Republic) B Krejčíková	6	5	2
LL	(Poland) M Fręch	6	2	6
(Netherlands) A Rus	3	6	4
(Romania) I-C Begu	6^{3}	7	7^{9}
LL	(Switzerland) L Küng	7^{7}	5	6^{7}
(Germany) L Siegemund	2	3
(Spain) S Sorribes Tormo	6	6

Quarterfinals
1	(Romania) S Halep	6	6
LL	(Poland) M Fręch	2	0
(Romania) I-C Begu	6	4	6
(Spain) S Sorribes Tormo	2	6	2

Semifinals
1	(Romania) S Halep	7^{7}	6
(Romania) I-C Begu	6^{2}	3

=== Bottom half ===
First round
8	(Russia) V Kudermetova	0	3
WC	(Canada) E Bouchard	6	6
(Slovenia) T Zidanšek	6	3	6
(Czech Republic) K Siniaková	3	6	0
(Italy) C Giorgi	4	6	7^{7}
Q	(Ukraine) M Kostyuk	6	2	6^{4}
(Italy) J Paolini	5	6	3
3	(Belgium) E Mertens	7	4	6
5	(Russia) E Alexandrova	2	4
Q	(Ukraine) L Tsurenko	6	6
(Romania) A Bogdan	6	6
LL	(Australia) S Sanders	1	1
(Czech Republic) Kr Plíšková	6	7
WC	(Czech Republic) L Fruhvirtová	2	5
(Russia) V Gracheva	6^{2}	3
2	(Croatia) P Martić	7^{7}	6

Second round
WC	(Canada) E Bouchard	7^{7}	6^{2}	6
(Slovenia) T Zidanšek	6^{2}	7^{7}	2
(Italy) C Giorgi	4	2
3	(Belgium) E Mertens	6	6
Q	(Ukraine) L Tsurenko
(Romania) A Bogdan	w/o
(Czech Republic) Kr Plíšková	6	7
2	(Croatia) P Martić	1	5

Quarterfinals
WC	(Canada) E Bouchard	4	6	4
3	(Belgium) E Mertens	6	1	6
(Romania) A Bogdan	5^{r}
(Czech Republic) Kr Plíšková	2

Semifinals
3	(Belgium) E Mertens	7	7^{7}
(Czech Republic) Kr Plíšková	5	6^{4}

== Qualifying ==
=== Seeds ===
1. ~~(Spain) Aliona Bolsova~~ (moved to main draw)
2. (Germany) Anna-Lena Friedsam (first round)
3. (Germany) Tamara Korpatsch (qualifying competition)
4. (France) Océane Dodin (first round)
5. (Russia) Liudmila Samsonova (first round)
6. (Belarus) Aliaksandra Sasnovich (second round)
7. (Slovenia) Kaja Juvan (second round)
8. (Belgium) Ysaline Bonaventure (first round)

=== Qualifiers ===
1. (Egypt) Mayar Sherif
2. (Ukraine) Marta Kostyuk
3. (Romania) Elena-Gabriela Ruse
4. (Ukraine) Lesia Tsurenko

=== Lucky losers ===
1. (Australia) Storm Sanders
2. (Poland) Magdalena Fręch
3. (Switzerland) Leonie Küng

=== Draw ===
==== First qualifier ====
First round
Alt	(Germany) Vivian Heisen	1	5
(Norway) Ulrikke Eikeri	6	7
(Egypt) Mayar Sherif	6	6
(Italy) Giulia Gatto-Monticone	3	2
(Romania) Laura Ioana Paar	6	6
WC	(Czech Republic) Linda Nosková	2	0
(Switzerland) Leonie Küng	6	6
5	(Russia) Liudmila Samsonova	2	2

Second round
(Norway) Ulrikke Eikeri	2	1
(Egypt) Mayar Sherif	6	6
(Romania) Laura Ioana Paar	7	3	1
(Switzerland) Leonie Küng	5	6	6

Qualifying competition
(Egypt) Mayar Sherif	4	6	6
(Switzerland) Leonie Küng	6	4	1

==== Second qualifier ====
First round
2	(Germany) Anna-Lena Friedsam	2	4
(Ukraine) Marta Kostyuk	6	6
WC	(Czech Republic) Nikola Bartůňková	2	2
(Czech Republic) Tereza Martincová	6	6
(Spain) Lara Arruabarrena	4	6	4
(Czech Republic) Jesika Malečková	6	2	6
(Australia) Storm Sanders	6	6
8	(Belgium) Ysaline Bonaventure	3	3

Second round
(Ukraine) Marta Kostyuk	6	2	6
(Czech Republic) Tereza Martincová	1	6	2
(Czech Republic) Jesika Malečková	6^{3}	4
(Australia) Storm Sanders	7^{7}	6

Qualifying competition
(Ukraine) Marta Kostyuk	6	6
(Australia) Storm Sanders	0	0

==== Third qualifier ====
First round
3	(Germany) Tamara Korpatsch	6	7^{8}
(Romania) Jaqueline Cristian	1	6^{6}
(Belgium) Yanina Wickmayer	3	0
(Argentina) Nadia Podoroska	6	6
(Netherlands) Indy de Vroome	4	3
(Romania) Elena-Gabriela Ruse	6	6
WC	(Czech Republic) Lucie Havlíčková	2	3
6	(Belarus) Aliaksandra Sasnovich	6	6

Second round
3	(Germany) Tamara Korpatsch	6	7^{7}
(Argentina) Nadia Podoroska	3	6^{5}
(Romania) Elena-Gabriela Ruse	6^{4}	6	7^{7}
6	(Belarus) Aliaksandra Sasnovich	7^{7}	4	6^{3}

Qualifying competition
3	(Germany) Tamara Korpatsch	6^{5}	6	4
(Romania) Elena-Gabriela Ruse	7^{7}	0	6

==== Fourth qualifier ====
First round
4	(France) Océane Dodin	3	2
(Ukraine) Lesia Tsurenko	6	6
(Australia) Ellen Perez	3	4
WC	(Czech Republic) Barbora Palicová	6	6
(Romania) Irina Bara	6	3	1
(Poland) Magdalena Fręch	2	6	6
(Russia) Anastasiya Komardina	5	2
7	(Slovenia) Kaja Juvan	7	6

Second round
(Ukraine) Lesia Tsurenko	2	6	6
WC	(Czech Republic) Barbora Palicová	6	4	1
(Poland) Magdalena Fręch	3	6	6
7	(Slovenia) Kaja Juvan	6	3	4

Qualifying competition
(Ukraine) Lesia Tsurenko	7^{9}	7^{7}
(Poland) Magdalena Fręch	6^{7}	6^{2}
