= 2014 Kremlin Cup =

- Date: 13–19 October
- Edition: 25th (men) / 19th (women)
- Surface: Hard
- Location: Moscow, Russia
- Venue: Olympic Stadium

Champions

Men's singles
- (Croatia) Marin Čilić

Women's singles
- (Russia) Anastasia Pavlyuchenkova

Men's doubles
- (Czech Republic) František Čermák / (Czech Republic) Jiří Veselý

Women's doubles
- (Switzerland) Martina Hingis / (Italy) Flavia Pennetta
← 2013 ·	Kremlin Cup	· 2015 →

The 2014 Kremlin Cup was a tennis tournament played on indoor hard courts. It was the 25th edition of the Kremlin Cup for the men (19th edition for the women) and part of the ATP World Tour 250 Series of the 2014 ATP World Tour, and of the Premier Series of the 2014 WTA Tour. It was held at the Olympic Stadium in Moscow, Russia, from 13 October through 19 October 2014.

== Points and prize money ==
=== Point distribution ===
Event	W	F	SF	QF	Round of 16	Round of 32	Q	Q3	Q2	Q1
Singles	470	305	185	100	55	1	25	18	13	1
Doubles	470	305	185	100	1	—	—	—	—	—

=== Prize money ===
Event	W	F	SF	QF	Round of 16	Round of 32	Q3	Q2	Q1
Singles	$120,000	$64,000	$34,865	$18,220	$9,700	$5,385	$2,210	$1,010	$635
Doubles	$38,000	$20,000	$11,000	$5,600	$3,035	—	—	—	—

== ATP singles main-draw entrants ==
=== Seeds ===
Country	Player	Rank^{1}	Seed
CAN	Milos Raonic	8	1
CRO	Marin Čilić	9	2
LAT	Ernests Gulbis	13	3
ITA	Fabio Fognini	17	4
ESP	Roberto Bautista Agut	18	5
ESP	Tommy Robredo	20	6
RUS	Mikhail Youzhny	35	7
ITA	Andreas Seppi	50	8

- Rankings are as of October 6, 2014

=== Other entrants ===
The following players received wildcards into the singles main draw:

- (Russia) Evgeny Donskoy
- (Russia) Karen Khachanov
- (Russia) Andrey Rublev

The following players received entry from the qualifying draw:

- (Russia) Victor Baluda
- (Lithuania) Ričardas Berankis
- (Russia) Aslan Karatsev
- (Serbia) Peđa Krstin

=== Withdrawals ===
Before the tournament

- (Uruguay) Pablo Cuevas → replaced by (Tunisia) Malek Jaziri
- (France) Richard Gasquet → replaced by (Spain) Pere Riba
- (Argentina) Máximo González → replaced by (Argentina) Juan Mónaco
- (Uzbekistan) Denis Istomin → replaced by (Spain) Daniel Gimeno Traver
- (Russia) Dmitry Tursunov → replaced by (Russia) Andrey Kuznetsov

== ATP doubles main-draw entrants ==
=== Seeds ===
Country	Player	Country	Player	Rank^{1}	Seed
CRO	Ivan Dodig	BRA	Marcelo Melo	11	1
AUS	Sam Groth	AUS	Chris Guccione	77	2
GBR	Colin Fleming	GBR	Jonathan Marray	147	3
ITA	Daniele Bracciali	ITA	Potito Starace	148	4

- ^{1} Rankings are as of October 6, 2014

=== Other entrants ===
The following pairs received wildcards into the doubles main draw:

- (Russia) Evgeny Donskoy / (Russia) Andrey Rublev
- (Russia) Konstantin Kravchuk / (Russia) Andrey Kuznetsov

== WTA singles main-draw entrants ==
=== Seeds ===
Country	Player	Rank^{1}	Seed
SVK	Dominika Cibulková	12	1
RUS	Ekaterina Makarova	13	2
ITA	Flavia Pennetta	15	3
CZE	Lucie Šafářová	17	4
RUS	Svetlana Kuznetsova	26	5
RUS	Anastasia Pavlyuchenkova	29	6
CZE	Karolína Plíšková	30	7
FRA	Caroline Garcia	34	8

- Rankings are as of October 6, 2014

=== Other entrants ===
The following players received wildcards into the singles main draw:

- (Russia) Darya Kasatkina
- (Serbia) Aleksandra Krunić

The following players received entry from the qualifying draw:

- (Russia) Vitalia Diatchenko
- (Ukraine) Kateryna Kozlova
- (Czech Republic) Kateřina Siniaková
- (Ukraine) Lesia Tsurenko

=== Withdrawals ===
Before the tournament

- (Italy) Sara Errani (bronchitis) → replaced by (Croatia) Ana Konjuh
- (Serbia) Ana Ivanovic (hip injury) → replaced by (Romania) Irina-Camelia Begu
- (Serbia) Jelena Janković (back injury) → replaced by (France) Kristina Mladenovic
- (Serbia) Bojana Jovanovski → replaced by (Bulgaria) Tsvetana Pironkova
- (Germany) Angelique Kerber → replaced by (Croatia) Donna Vekić
- (Czech Republic) Petra Kvitová → replaced by (Croatia) Ajla Tomljanović
- (Slovakia) Magdaléna Rybáriková (left hip strain) → replaced by (Belarus) Olga Govortsova
- (Spain) Carla Suárez Navarro (right elbow injury) → replaced by (Russia) Elena Vesnina
- (Denmark) Caroline Wozniacki → replaced by (Montenegro) Danka Kovinić

=== Retirements ===
- (Belarus) Olga Govortsova (left knee injury)
- (Czech Republic) Klára Koukalová (viral illness)

== WTA doubles main-draw entrants ==
=== Seeds ===
Country	Player	Country	Player	Rank^{1}	Seed
RUS	Ekaterina Makarova	RUS	Elena Vesnina	11	1
ITA	Flavia Pennetta	SUI	Martina Hingis	31	2
RUS	Anastasia Pavlyuchenkova	CZE	Lucie Šafářová	57	3
FRA	Caroline Garcia	ESP	Arantxa Parra Santonja	67	4

- ^{1} Rankings are as of October 6, 2014

=== Other entrants ===
The following pair received a wildcard into the doubles main draw:

- (Russia) Veronika Kudermetova / (Russia) Evgeniya Rodina

== Champions ==
=== Men's singles ===
- (Croatia) Marin Čilić def. (Spain) Roberto Bautista Agut, 6–4, 6–4

=== Women's singles ===
- (Russia) Anastasia Pavlyuchenkova def. (Romania) Irina-Camelia Begu, 6–4, 5–7, 6–1

=== Men's doubles ===
- (Czech Republic) František Čermák / (Czech Republic) Jiří Veselý def. (Australia) Sam Groth / (Australia) Chris Guccione, 7–6^{(7–2)}, 7–5

=== Women's doubles ===
- (Switzerland) Martina Hingis / (Italy) Flavia Pennetta def. (France) Caroline Garcia / (Spain) Arantxa Parra Santonja, 6–3, 7–5
