= 2014 Kremlin Cup – Women's doubles =

Women's doubles
- 2014 Kremlin Cup

Final
- Champions: (Switzerland) Martina Hingis (Italy) Flavia Pennetta
- Runners-up: (France) Caroline Garcia (Spain) Arantxa Parra Santonja
- Score: 6–3, 7–5

Details
- Seeds: 4

Events
Singles	men	women
Doubles	men	women
← 2013 ·	Kremlin Cup	· 2015 →

Svetlana Kuznetsova and Samantha Stosur were the defending champions, but chose not to participate this year.
Martina Hingis and Flavia Pennetta won the title, defeating Caroline Garcia and Arantxa Parra Santonja in the final, 6–3, 7–5.

== Seeds ==
1. (Russia) Ekaterina Makarova / (Russia) Elena Vesnina (first round)
2. (Switzerland) Martina Hingis / (Italy) Flavia Pennetta (champions)
3. (Russia) Anastasia Pavlyuchenkova / (Czech Republic) Lucie Šafářová (first round)
4. (France) Caroline Garcia / (Spain) Arantxa Parra Santonja (final)

== Draw ==
=== Key ===
- Q = Qualifier
- WC = Wild card
- LL = Lucky loser
- Alt = Alternate
- SE = Special exempt
- PR = Protected ranking
- ITF = ITF entry
- JE = Junior exempt
- w/o = Walkover
- r = Retired
- d = Defaulted
- SR = Special ranking

=== Draw ===
First round
1	(Russia) E Makarova (Russia) E Vesnina	2	6	[8]
(Serbia) A Krunić (Czech Republic) K Siniaková	6	2	[10]
(Ukraine) L Kichenok (Ukraine) O Savchuk	6	7^{7}
(United States) B Mattek-Sands (Croatia) A Tomljanović	2	6^{5}
4	(France) C Garcia (Spain) A Parra Santonja	7^{7}	2	[10]
(Poland) P Kania (Russia) V Solovyeva	6^{1}	6	[5]
(Russia) V Diatchenko (Georgia (country)) O Kalashnikova	6	3	[8]
(Romania) R Olaru (Israel) S Pe'er	3	6	[10]
(Croatia) D Jurak (United States) M Moulton-Levy	4	3
WC	(Russia) V Kudermetova (Russia) E Rodina	6	6
(Russia) M Gasparyan (Russia) A Panova	6	6^{5}	[11]
3	(Russia) A Pavlyuchenkova (Czech Republic) L Šafářová	4	7^{7}	[9]
(Poland) K Jans-Ignacik (France) K Mladenovic	6^{3}	6	[6]
(Romania) I-C Begu (Australia) Ar Rodionova	7^{7}	0	[10]
(Canada) G Dabrowski (Poland) A Rosolska	7	1	[4]
2	(Switzerland) M Hingis (Italy) F Pennetta	5	6	[10]

Quarterfinals
(Serbia) A Krunić (Czech Republic) K Siniaková	2	7^{7}	[9]
(Ukraine) L Kichenok (Ukraine) O Savchuk	6	6^{4}	[11]
4	(France) C Garcia (Spain) A Parra Santonja	6	6
(Romania) R Olaru (Israel) S Pe'er	1	3
WC	(Russia) V Kudermetova (Russia) E Rodina	3	3
(Russia) M Gasparyan (Russia) A Panova	6	6
(Romania) I-C Begu (Australia) Ar Rodionova	2	5
2	(Switzerland) M Hingis (Italy) F Pennetta	6	7

Semifinals
(Ukraine) L Kichenok (Ukraine) O Savchuk	2	7^{7}	[10]
4	(France) C Garcia (Spain) A Parra Santonja	6	6^{5}	[12]
(Russia) M Gasparyan (Russia) A Panova	3	2
2	(Switzerland) M Hingis (Italy) F Pennetta	6	6

Final
4	(France) C Garcia (Spain) A Parra Santonja	3	5
2	(Switzerland) M Hingis (Italy) F Pennetta	6	7
