= 2016 Kremlin Cup – Men's doubles =

Men's doubles
- 2016 Kremlin Cup

Final
- Champion: (Colombia) Juan Sebastián Cabal (Colombia) Robert Farah
- Runner-up: (Austria) Julian Knowle (Austria) Jürgen Melzer
- Score: 7–5, 4–6, [10–5]

Details
- Draw: 16
- Seeds: 4

Events
Singles	men	women
Doubles	men	women
← 2015 ·	Kremlin Cup	· 2017 →

Dmitry Tursunov and Andrey Rublev were the defending champions, but Tursunov chose not to participate this year. Rublev played alongside Daniil Medvedev, but lost in the semifinals to Julian Knowle and Jürgen Melzer.

Juan Sebastián Cabal and Robert Farah won the title, defeating Knowle and Melzer in the final, 7–5, 4–6, [10–5].

== Seeds ==
1. (Spain) Pablo Carreño Busta / (Spain) Marcel Granollers (quarterfinals, withdrew)
2. (Colombia) Juan Sebastian Cabal / (Colombia) Robert Farah (champions)
3. (Argentina) Guillermo Durán / (Poland) Mariusz Fyrstenberg (first round)
4. (Netherlands) Wesley Koolhof / (Netherlands) Matwé Middelkoop (first round)

== Draw ==
=== Key ===
- Q = Qualifier
- WC = Wild card
- LL = Lucky loser
- Alt = Alternate
- SE = Special exempt
- PR = Protected ranking
- ITF = ITF entry
- JE = Junior exempt
- w/o = Walkover
- r = Retired
- d = Defaulted
- SR = Special ranking

=== Draw ===
First round
1	(Spain) P Carreño Busta (Spain) M Granollers	6	4	[10]
(India) P Raja (India) D Sharan	4	6	[2]
WC	(Russia) D Medvedev (Russia) A Rublev	6	6
WC	(Russia) E Donskoy (Russia) T Gabashvili	2	4
3	(Argentina) G Durán (Poland) M Fyrstenberg	6	2	[8]
PR	(Austria) J Knowle (Austria) J Melzer	3	6	[10]
(Kazakhstan) M Kukushkin (France) S Robert	6	6
(Italy) P Lorenzi (Argentina) G Pella	4	4
(Argentina) A Molteni (Chile) H Podlipnik	4	6^{2}
(Belarus) A Bury (Austria) G Melzer	6	7^{7}
(Russia) K Kravchuk (Russia) A Kuznetsov	7	3	[10]
4	(Netherlands) W Koolhof (Netherlands) M Middelkoop	5	6	[6]
PR	(Germany) A Begemann (India) L Paes	5	4
(Croatia) N Mektić (Croatia) A Šančić	7	6
PR	(Lithuania) R Berankis (Serbia) J Tipsarević	6^{5}	0
2	(Colombia) JS Cabal (Colombia) R Farah	7^{7}	6

Quarterfinals
1	(Spain) P Carreño Busta (Spain) M Granollers
WC	(Russia) D Medvedev (Russia) A Rublev	w/o
PR	(Austria) J Knowle (Austria) J Melzer	6	5	[11]
(Kazakhstan) M Kukushkin (France) S Robert	1	7	[9]
(Belarus) A Bury (Austria) G Melzer	5	6	[6]
(Russia) K Kravchuk (Russia) A Kuznetsov	7	4	[10]
(Croatia) N Mektić (Croatia) A Šančić	6^{2}	6	[4]
2	(Colombia) JS Cabal (Colombia) R Farah	7^{7}	4	[10]

Semifinals
WC	(Russia) D Medvedev (Russia) A Rublev	6^{3}	6	[2]
PR	(Austria) J Knowle (Austria) J Melzer	7^{7}	3	[10]
(Russia) K Kravchuk (Russia) A Kuznetsov	6	2	[4]
2	(Colombia) JS Cabal (Colombia) R Farah	3	6	[10]

Final
PR	(Austria) J Knowle (Austria) J Melzer	5	6	[5]
2	(Colombia) JS Cabal (Colombia) R Farah	7	4	[10]
