= 2017 Kremlin Cup =

- Date: 16–22 October
- Edition: 28th (men) / 22nd (women)
- Surface: Hard
- Location: Moscow, Russia
- Venue: Olympic Stadium

Champions

Men's singles
- (Bosnia and Herzegovina) Damir Džumhur

Women's singles
- (Germany) Julia Görges

Men's doubles
- (Belarus) Max Mirnyi / (Austria) Philipp Oswald

Women's doubles
- (Hungary) Tímea Babos / (Czech Republic) Andrea Hlaváčková
- Kremlin Cup

The 2017 Kremlin Cup (also known as the 2017 VTB Kremlin Cup for sponsorship reasons) was a tennis tournament played on indoor hard courts. It was the 28th edition of the Kremlin Cup for the men and the 22nd edition for the women. The tournament was part of the ATP World Tour 250 Series of the 2017 ATP World Tour, and of the Premier Series of the 2017 WTA Tour. It was held at the Olympic Stadium in Moscow, Russia, from 16 October through 22 October 2017.

== ATP singles main-draw entrants ==
=== Seeds ===
Country	Player	Rank^{1}	Seed
ESP	Pablo Carreño Busta	11	1
ESP	Albert Ramos Viñolas	25	2
FRA	Adrian Mannarino	29	3
GER	Philipp Kohlschreiber	33	4
RUS	Andrey Rublev	35	5
BIH	Damir Džumhur	37	6
ITA	Paolo Lorenzi	39	7
~~RUS~~	~~Karen Khachanov~~	~~40~~	~~8~~

- Rankings are as of October 9, 2017

=== Other entrants ===
The following players received wildcards into the singles main draw:

- (Russia) Teymuraz Gabashvili
- (Russia) Konstantin Kravchuk
- (Russia) Roman Safiullin

The following players received entry using a protected ranking into the singles main draw:

- (Lithuania) Ričardas Berankis

The following players received entry from the qualifying draw:

- (Bosnia and Herzegovina) Mirza Bašić
- (India) Yuki Bhambri
- (Serbia) Filip Krajinović
- (Czech Republic) Lukáš Rosol

The following player received entry as a lucky loser:

- (Kazakhstan) Alexander Bublik

=== Withdrawals ===
Before the tournament

- (Brazil) Thomaz Bellucci →replaced by (Slovenia) Blaž Kavčič
- (Russia) Karen Khachanov →replaced by (Kazakhstan) Alexander Bublik
- (Spain) Feliciano López →replaced by (Russia) Evgeny Donskoy
- (Serbia) Janko Tipsarević →replaced by (Serbia) Dušan Lajović

=== Retirements ===
- (Slovenia) Blaž Kavčič
- (Czech Republic) Jiří Veselý

== ATP doubles main-draw entrants ==
=== Seeds ===
Country	Player	Country	Player	Rank^{1}	Seed
BLR	Max Mirnyi	AUT	Philipp Oswald	117	1
CHI	Hans Podlipnik Castillo	BLR	Andrei Vasilevski	135	2
COL	Juan Sebastián Cabal	UKR	Denys Molchanov	149	3
USA	James Cerretani	AUS	Marc Polmans	161	4

- ^{1} Rankings are as of October 9, 2017

=== Other entrants ===
The following pairs received wildcards into the doubles main draw:

- (Russia) Aslan Karatsev / (Russia) Richard Muzaev
- (Russia) Konstantin Kravchuk / (Russia) Andrey Rublev

=== Withdrawals ===
During the tournament

- (Czech Republic) Jiří Veselý

== WTA singles main-draw entrants ==
=== Seeds ===
Country	Player	Rank^{1}	Seed
FRA	Kristina Mladenovic	13	1
USA	CoCo Vandeweghe	15	2
RUS	Elena Vesnina	19	3
LAT	Anastasija Sevastova	20	4
RUS	Anastasia Pavlyuchenkova	21	5
AUS	Daria Gavrilova	22	6
GER	Julia Görges	27	7
SVK	Magdaléna Rybáriková	28	8

- Rankings are as of October 9, 2017

=== Other entrants ===
The following players received wildcards into the singles main draw:

- (Russia) Olesya Pervushina
- (Russia) Maria Sharapova

The following players received entry from the qualifying draw:

- (Estonia) Kaia Kanepi
- (Belarus) Vera Lapko
- (Russia) Polina Monova
- (Russia) Elena Rybakina

=== Withdrawals ===
Before the tournament

- (Slovakia) Dominika Cibulková →replaced by (Croatia) Donna Vekić
- (United Kingdom) Johanna Konta →replaced by (Hungary) Tímea Babos
- (Russia) Svetlana Kuznetsova →replaced by (Belgium) Maryna Zanevska
- (Latvia) Jeļena Ostapenko →replaced by (Romania) Irina-Camelia Begu
- (Spain) Carla Suárez Navarro →replaced by (Russia) Natalia Vikhlyantseva

=== Retirements ===
- (Australia) Daria Gavrilova
- (Slovakia) Magdaléna Rybáriková

== WTA doubles main-draw entrants ==
=== Seeds ===
Country	Player	Country	Player	Rank^{1}	Seed
HUN	Tímea Babos	CZE	Andrea Hlaváčková	21	1
UKR	Olga Savchuk	SLO	Katarina Srebotnik	67	2
CZE	Barbora Krejčíková	CZE	Kateřina Siniaková	70	3
ROU	Irina-Camelia Begu	ROU	Raluca Olaru	84	4

- ^{1} Rankings are as of October 9, 2017

=== Other entrants ===
The following pair received a wildcard into the doubles main draw:

- (Russia) Anna Blinkova / (Russia) Elena Rybakina

== Champions ==
=== Men's singles ===
- (Bosnia and Herzegovina) Damir Džumhur def. (Lithuania) Ričardas Berankis, 6–2, 1–6, 6–4

=== Women's singles ===
- (Germany) Julia Görges def. (Russia) Daria Kasatkina, 6–1, 6–2

=== Men's doubles ===
- (Belarus) Max Mirnyi / (Austria) Philipp Oswald def. (Bosnia and Herzegovina) Damir Džumhur / (Croatia) Antonio Šančić, 6–3, 7–5

=== Women's doubles ===
- (Hungary) Tímea Babos / (Czech Republic) Andrea Hlaváčková def. (United States) Nicole Melichar / (United Kingdom) Anna Smith, 6–2, 3–6, [10–3]
