= 2016 Kremlin Cup – Women's doubles =

Women's doubles
- 2016 Kremlin Cup

Final
- Champions: (Czech Republic) Andrea Hlaváčková (Czech Republic) Lucie Hradecká
- Runners-up: (Australia) Daria Gavrilova (Russia) Daria Kasatkina
- Score: 4–6, 6–0, [10–7]

Details
- Seeds: 4

Events
Singles	men	women
Doubles	men	women
← 2015 ·	Kremlin Cup	· 2017 →

Daria Kasatkina and Elena Vesnina were the defending champions, but chose not to participate together this year. Vesnina played with Ekaterina Makarova, but lost to Daria Gavrilova and Kasatkina in the first round.

Andrea Hlaváčková and Lucie Hradecká won the title, defeating Gavrilova and Kasatkina in the final, 4–6, 6–0, [10–7].

== Seeds ==
1. (Russia) Ekaterina Makarova / (Russia) Elena Vesnina (first round)
2. (Czech Republic) Andrea Hlaváčková / (Czech Republic) Lucie Hradecká (champions)
3. (Czech Republic) Kateřina Siniaková / (Slovenia) Katarina Srebotnik (semifinals)
4. (Australia) Anastasia Rodionova / (Ukraine) Olga Savchuk (first round)

== Draw ==
=== Key ===
- Q = Qualifier
- WC = Wild card
- LL = Lucky loser
- Alt = Alternate
- SE = Special exempt
- PR = Protected ranking
- ITF = ITF entry
- JE = Junior exempt
- w/o = Walkover
- r = Retired
- d = Defaulted
- SR = Special ranking

First round
1	(Russia) E Makarova (Russia) E Vesnina	3	6	[6]
(Australia) D Gavrilova (Russia) D Kasatkina	6	4	[10]
(Ukraine) L Kichenok (Ukraine) N Kichenok	6	6
(Romania) R Olaru (Spain) A Parra Santonja	2	4
4	(Australia) An Rodionova (Ukraine) O Savchuk	6^{4}	4
(Hungary) T Babos (Russia) A Pavlyuchenkova	7^{7}	6
(Paraguay) V Cepede Royg (Argentina) M Irigoyen	2	6^{5}
(Poland) P Kania (Montenegro) D Kovinić	6	7^{7}
WC	(Russia) A Kalinskaya (Russia) O Pervushina	4	6	[10]
(Belarus) L Marozava (Russia) M Melnikova	6	2	[2]
(Switzerland) B Bencic (France) K Mladenovic	2	3
3	(Czech Republic) K Siniaková (Slovenia) K Srebotnik	6	6
WC	(Russia) N Dzalamidze (Russia) V Kudermetova	6	7^{7}
(Georgia (country)) O Kalashnikova (Latvia) J Ostapenko	1	6^{4}
(Russia) V Ivakhnenko (Poland) A Rosolska	0	6	[6]
2	(Czech Republic) A Hlaváčková (Czech Republic) L Hradecká	6	4	[10]

Quarterfinals
(Australia) D Gavrilova (Russia) D Kasatkina	6	6
(Ukraine) L Kichenok (Ukraine) N Kichenok	2	2
(Hungary) T Babos (Russia) A Pavlyuchenkova	4	4
(Poland) P Kania (Montenegro) D Kovinić	6	6
WC	(Russia) A Kalinskaya (Russia) O Pervushina	2	5
3	(Czech Republic) K Siniaková (Slovenia) K Srebotnik	6	7
WC	(Russia) N Dzalamidze (Russia) V Kudermetova	2	4
2	(Czech Republic) A Hlaváčková (Czech Republic) L Hradecká	6	6

Semifinals
(Australia) D Gavrilova (Russia) D Kasatkina	6	6
(Poland) P Kania (Montenegro) D Kovinić	2	4
3	(Czech Republic) K Siniaková (Slovenia) K Srebotnik	2	7^{7}	[11]
2	(Czech Republic) A Hlaváčková (Czech Republic) L Hradecká	6	6^{5}	[13]

Final
(Australia) D Gavrilova (Russia) D Kasatkina	6	0	[7]
2	(Czech Republic) A Hlaváčková (Czech Republic) L Hradecká	4	6	[10]
