= 2016 Kremlin Cup =

- Date: 17–23 October
- Edition: 27th (men) / 21st (women)
- Surface: Hard
- Location: Moscow, Russia
- Venue: Olympic Stadium

Champions

Men's singles
- (Spain) Pablo Carreño Busta

Women's singles
- (Russia) Svetlana Kuznetsova

Men's doubles
- (Colombia) Juan Sebastián Cabal / (Colombia) Robert Farah

Women's doubles
- (Czech Republic) Andrea Hlaváčková / (Czech Republic) Lucie Hradecká
- Kremlin Cup

The 2016 Kremlin Cup (also known as the 2016 VTB Kremlin Cup for sponsorship reasons) was a tennis tournament played on indoor hard courts. It was the 27th edition of the Kremlin Cup for the men and the 21st edition for the women. The tournament was part of the ATP World Tour 250 Series of the 2016 ATP World Tour, and of the Premier series of the 2016 WTA Tour. It was held at the Olympic Stadium in Moscow, Russia, from 17 October through 23 October 2016.

On 15 October, a record high of 4800 people visited the qualifying rounds; according to Tarpishchev, in no other tennis tournament was that number so high.

== ATP singles main-draw entrants ==
=== Seeds ===
Country	Player	Rank^{1}	Seed
ESP	Roberto Bautista Agut	19	1
ESP	Albert Ramos Viñolas	27	2
GER	Philipp Kohlschreiber	30	3
SRB	Viktor Troicki	31	4
SVK	~~Martin Kližan~~	~~33~~	~~5~~
ESP	Pablo Carreño Busta	35	6
ITA	Paolo Lorenzi	37	7
RUS	Andrey Kuznetsov	42	8
ESP	Marcel Granollers	43	9

- Rankings are as of October 10, 2016

=== Other entrants ===
The following players received wildcards into the singles main draw:

- (Turkey) Cem İlkel
- (Russia) Karen Khachanov
- (Russia) Konstantin Kravchuk

The following players received entry from the qualifying draw:

- (Russia) Alexander Bublik
- (Russia) Aslan Karatsev
- (Russia) Daniil Medvedev
- (Austria) Jürgen Melzer

The following player received entry as a lucky loser:

- (Italy) Federico Gaio

=== Withdrawals ===
Before the tournament

- (Australia) Bernard Tomic →replaced by (Russia) Evgeny Donskoy
- (Czech Republic) Jiří Veselý →replaced by (Czech Republic) Lukáš Rosol
- (Slovakia) Martin Kližan →replaced by (Italy) Federico Gaio

=== Retirements ===
- (Spain) Marcel Granollers
- (Russia) Aslan Karatsev
- (Kazakhstan) Mikhail Kukushkin

== ATP doubles main-draw entrants ==
=== Seeds ===
Country	Player	Country	Player	Rank^{1}	Seed
ESP	Pablo Carreño Busta	ESP	Marcel Granollers	52	1
COL	Juan Sebastián Cabal	COL	Robert Farah	60	2
ARG	Guillermo Durán	POL	Mariusz Fyrstenberg	119	3
NED	Wesley Koolhof	NED	Matwé Middelkoop	119	4

- ^{1} Rankings are as of October 10, 2016

=== Other entrants ===
The following pairs received wildcards into the doubles main draw:

- (Russia) Evgeny Donskoy / (Russia) Teymuraz Gabashvili
- (Russia) Daniil Medvedev / (Russia) Andrey Rublev

=== Withdrawals ===
During the tournament

- (Spain) Marcel Granollers

== WTA singles main-draw entrants ==
=== Seeds ===
Country	Player	Rank^{1}	Seed
RUS	Svetlana Kuznetsova	8	1
~~SVK~~	~~Dominika Cibulková~~	~~10~~	~~2~~
ESP	Carla Suárez Navarro	12	3
UKR	Elina Svitolina	15	4
RUS	Elena Vesnina	19	5
CZE	Barbora Strýcová	20	6
RUS	Anastasia Pavlyuchenkova	21	7
RUS	Daria Kasatkina	24	8
HUN	Tímea Babos	26	9

- Rankings are as of October 10, 2016

=== Other entrants ===
The following players received wildcards into the singles main draw:

- (Russia) Anna Kalinskaya
- (Russia) Svetlana Kuznetsova

The following players received entry from the qualifying draw:

- (Russia) Anna Blinkova
- (United States) Nicole Gibbs
- (Czech Republic) Kateřina Siniaková
- (Ukraine) Lesia Tsurenko

The following player entered as a lucky loser:

- (Croatia) Ana Konjuh

=== Withdrawals ===
Before the tournament

- (Italy) Sara Errani →replaced by (Latvia) Anastasija Sevastova
- (Czech Republic) Karolína Plíšková →replaced by (United States) Shelby Rogers
- (Puerto Rico) Monica Puig →replaced by (Montenegro) Danka Kovinić
- (Slovakia) Dominika Cibulková →replaced by (Croatia) Ana Konjuh

During the tournament

- (Russia) Anna Blinkova

=== Retirements ===
- (Spain) Carla Suárez Navarro

== WTA doubles main-draw entrants ==
=== Seeds ===
Country	Player	Country	Player	Rank^{1}	Seed
RUS	Ekaterina Makarova	RUS	Elena Vesnina	15	1
CZE	Andrea Hlaváčková	CZE	Lucie Hradecká	25	2
CZE	Kateřina Siniaková	SLO	Katarina Srebotnik	60	3
AUS	Anastasia Rodionova	UKR	Olga Savchuk	100	4

- ^{1} Rankings are as of October 10, 2016

=== Other entrants ===
The following pairs received wildcards into the doubles main draw:

- (Russia) Anna Kalinskaya / (Russia) Olesya Pervushina
- (Russia) Natela Dzalamidze / (Russia) Veronika Kudermetova

== Champions ==
=== Men's singles ===
- (Spain) Pablo Carreño Busta def. (Italy) Fabio Fognini, 4–6, 6–3, 6–2

=== Women's singles ===
- (Russia) Svetlana Kuznetsova def. (Australia) Daria Gavrilova, 6–2, 6–1

=== Men's doubles ===
- (Colombia) Juan Sebastián Cabal / (Colombia) Robert Farah def. (Austria) Julian Knowle / (Austria) Jürgen Melzer, 7–5, 4–6, [10–5]

=== Women's doubles ===
- (Czech Republic) Andrea Hlaváčková / (Czech Republic) Lucie Hradecká def. (Australia) Daria Gavrilova / (Russia) Daria Kasatkina, 4–6, 6–0, [10–7]
