= 2014 Kremlin Cup – Men's singles =

Men's singles
- 2014 Kremlin Cup

Final
- Champion: (Croatia) Marin Čilić
- Runner-up: (Spain) Roberto Bautista Agut
- Score: 6–4, 6–4

Details
- Draw: 28 (4 Q / 3 WC )
- Seeds: 8

Events
Singles	men	women
Doubles	men	women
← 2013 ·	Kremlin Cup	· 2015 →

Richard Gasquet was the defending champion, but withdrew before the tournament began.
Marin Čilić won the title, defeating Roberto Bautista Agut in the final, 6–4, 6–4.

== Seeds ==
The first four seeds received a bye into the second round.

1. (Canada) Milos Raonic (second round)
2. (Croatia) Marin Čilić (champion)
3. (Latvia) Ernests Gulbis (semifinals)
4. (Italy) Fabio Fognini (second round)
5. (Spain) Roberto Bautista Agut (final)
6. (Spain) Tommy Robredo (quarterfinals)
7. (Russia) Mikhail Youzhny (quarterfinals)
8. (Italy) Andreas Seppi (quarterfinals)

== Draw ==
=== Key ===
- Q = Qualifier
- WC = Wild card
- LL = Lucky loser
- Alt = Alternate
- SE = Special exempt
- PR = Protected ranking
- ITF = ITF entry
- JE = Junior exempt
- w/o = Walkover
- r = Retired
- d = Defaulted
- SR = Special ranking

=== Finals ===
Semifinals
5	(Spain) Roberto Bautista Agut	6	6
3	(Latvia) Ernests Gulbis	4	4
(Kazakhstan) Mikhail Kukushkin	6	3	2
2	(Croatia) Marin Čilić	4	6	6

Final
5	(Spain) Roberto Bautista Agut	4	4
2	(Croatia) Marin Čilić	6	6

=== Top half ===
First round
Q	(Lithuania) R Berankis	6	6
Q	(Russia) A Karatsev	3	4
(Australia) S Groth	7^{7}	7
WC	(Russia) A Rublev	6^{4}	5
(Russia) A Kuznetsov	3	4
5	(Spain) R Bautista Agut	6	6
(Czech Republic) J Veselý	5	3
(Spain) D Gimeno Traver	7	6
(Croatia) I Dodig	6	6
(Spain) P Riba	4	2
(Serbia) D Lajović	5	4
8	(Italy) A Seppi	7	6

Second round
1	(Canada) M Raonic	3	6	3
Q	(Lithuania) R Berankis	6	4	6
(Australia) S Groth	6^{5}	6^{4}
5	(Spain) R Bautista Agut	7^{7}	7^{7}
3	(Latvia) E Gulbis	6	7^{7}
(Spain) D Gimeno Traver	3	6^{3}
(Croatia) I Dodig	5	6^{3}
8	(Italy) A Seppi	7	7^{7}

Quarterfinals
Q	(Lithuania) R Berankis	5	3
5	(Spain) R Bautista Agut	7	6
3	(Latvia) E Gulbis	7^{8}	4	7^{7}
8	(Italy) A Seppi	6^{6}	6	6^{3}

Semifinals
5	(Spain) R Bautista Agut	6	6
3	(Latvia) E Gulbis	4	4

=== Bottom half ===
First round
7	(Russia) M Youzhny	6	6
Q	(Russia) V Baluda	3	4
(Italy) P Lorenzi	3	7	3
(Argentina) J Mónaco	6	5	6
(Kazakhstan) M Kukushkin	6^{3}	6	6
WC	(Russia) K Khachanov	7^{7}	0	2
6	(Spain) T Robredo	7^{8}	6
Q	(Serbia) P Krstin	6^{6}	4
(Tunisia) M Jaziri	4	2
(Serbia) F Krajinović	6	6
(Israel) D Sela	4	0
WC	(Russia) E Donskoy	6	6

Second round
7	(Russia) M Youzhny	6	7^{8}
(Argentina) J Mónaco	3	6^{6}
(Kazakhstan) M Kukushkin	6	6
4	(Italy) F Fognini	4	2
6	(Spain) T Robredo	6	6
(Serbia) F Krajinović	3	4
WC	(Russia) E Donskoy	3	6	3
2	(Croatia) M Čilić	6	3	6

Quarterfinals
7	(Russia) M Youzhny	6	6^{5}	0
(Kazakhstan) M Kukushkin	1	7^{7}	6
6	(Spain) T Robredo	3	3
2	(Croatia) M Čilić	6	6

Semifinals
(Kazakhstan) M Kukushkin	6	3	2
2	(Croatia) M Čilić	4	6	6

== Qualifying ==
=== Seeds ===
1. (Bosnia and Herzegovina) Damir Džumhur (second round)
2. (Lithuania) Ričardas Berankis (qualified)
3. (Croatia) Ante Pavić (first round)
4. (France) Lucas Pouille (qualifying competition)
5. (Ukraine) Illya Marchenko (second round)
6. (Ukraine) Denys Molchanov (first round)
7. (Moldova) Radu Albot (second round)
8. (Georgia (country)) Nikoloz Basilashvili (first round)

=== Qualifiers ===
1. (Russia) Victor Baluda
2. (Lithuania) Ričardas Berankis
3. (Serbia) Peđa Krstin
4. (Russia) Aslan Karatsev

=== Qualifying draw ===
==== First qualifier ====
First round
1	(Bosnia and Herzegovina) Damir Džumhur	6^{8}	6	6
WC	(Russia) Alexander Bublik	7^{10}	3	2
(Spain) Íñigo Cervantes	4	2
(Russia) Victor Baluda	6	6
(Russia) Aleksandr Lobkov	0^{r}
(Russia) Denis Matsukevich	1
(Italy) Simone Vagnozzi	4	6	6
6	(Ukraine) Denys Molchanov	6	2	2

Second round
1	(Bosnia and Herzegovina) Damir Džumhur	4	6	3
(Russia) Victor Baluda	6	1	6
(Russia) Denis Matsukevich	6	6
(Italy) Simone Vagnozzi	4	4

Qualifying competition
(Russia) Victor Baluda	3	6	6
(Russia) Denis Matsukevich	6	4	1

==== Second qualifier ====
First round
2	(Lithuania) Ričardas Berankis	6	7
(Russia) Anton Zaitcev	2	5
(Russia) Philipp Davydenko	6	1	6
(Russia) Aleksandr Vasilenko	3	6	4
(Russia) Alexey Vatutin	5	2
(Russia) Konstantin Kravchuk	7	6
(Poland) Błażej Koniusz	4	2
5	(Ukraine) Illya Marchenko	6	6

Second round
2	(Lithuania) Ričardas Berankis	4	7	6
(Russia) Philipp Davydenko	6	5	4
(Russia) Konstantin Kravchuk	6	6
5	(Ukraine) Illya Marchenko	2	3

Qualifying competition
2	(Lithuania) Ričardas Berankis	6	6
(Russia) Konstantin Kravchuk	4	1

==== Third qualifier ====
First round
3	(Croatia) Ante Pavić	2	6^{4}
(Serbia) Peđa Krstin	6	7^{7}
(Serbia) Nikola Ćaćić	5	5
(Belarus) Egor Gerasimov	7	7
(Belarus) Yaraslav Shyla	7^{7}	6
WC	(Russia) Vladimir Polyakov	6^{3}	1
(Kazakhstan) Evgeny Korolev	1	1
7	(Moldova) Radu Albot	6	6

Second round
(Serbia) Peđa Krstin	6	6
(Belarus) Egor Gerasimov	4	3
(Belarus) Yaraslav Shyla	6	6
7	(Moldova) Radu Albot	4	4

Qualifying competition
(Serbia) Peđa Krstin	4	7^{7}	6
(Belarus) Yaraslav Shyla	6	6^{3}	4

==== Fourth qualifier ====
First round
4	(France) Lucas Pouille	6	6
(Ukraine) Vadim Alekseenko	1	1
(Russia) Richard Muzaev	7	3	4
WC	(Russia) Evgeny Karlovskiy	6^{5}	6	6
(Russia) Mikhail Ledovskikh	3	6^{6}
WC	(Russia) Daniil Medvedev	6	7^{8}
(Russia) Aslan Karatsev	6	7
8	(Georgia (country)) Nikoloz Basilashvili	1	5

Second round
4	(France) Lucas Pouille	2	6	6
WC	(Russia) Evgeny Karlovskiy	6	4	2
WC	(Russia) Daniil Medvedev	2	7^{7}	2
(Russia) Aslan Karatsev	6	6^{3}	6

Qualifying competition
4	(France) Lucas Pouille	6^{3}	6^{5}
(Russia) Aslan Karatsev	7^{7}	7^{7}
