= 2014 Kremlin Cup – Women's singles =

Women's singles
- 2014 Kremlin Cup

Final
- Champion: (Russia) Anastasia Pavlyuchenkova
- Runner-up: (Romania) Irina-Camelia Begu
- Score: 6–4, 5–7, 6–1

Details
- Seeds: 8

Events
Singles	men	women
Doubles	men	women
- Kremlin Cup

Simona Halep was the defending champion, but she chose not to participate in 2014.

Anastasia Pavlyuchenkova won the title, defeating Irina-Camelia Begu in the final, 6–4, 5–7, 6–1.

== Seeds ==
The first four seeds received a bye into the second round.

1. (Slovakia) Dominika Cibulková (second round)
2. (Russia) Ekaterina Makarova (second round)
3. (Italy) Flavia Pennetta (second round)
4. (Czech Republic) Lucie Šafářová (semifinals)
5. (Russia) Svetlana Kuznetsova (quarterfinals)
6. (Russia) Anastasia Pavlyuchenkova (champion)
7. (Czech Republic) Karolína Plíšková (first round)
8. (France) Caroline Garcia (first round)

== Draw ==
Key

- Q = Qualifier
- WC = Wild card
- LL = Lucky loser
- Alt = Alternate
- ITF = ITF entry
- PR = Protected ranking
- SR = Special ranking
- SE = Special exempt
- JE = Junior exempt
- JR = Junior Accelerator Programme entrant
- CO = College Accelerator Programme entrant
- NG = Next Gen Accelerator Program entrant
- w/o = Walkover
- r = Retired
- d = Defaulted

=== Finals ===
Semifinals
6	(Russia) Anastasia Pavlyuchenkova	6	6
Q	(Czech Republic) Kateřina Siniaková	2	2
4	(Czech Republic) Lucie Šafářová	6^{5}	6	3
(Romania) Irina-Camelia Begu	7^{7}	1	6

Final
6	(Russia) Anastasia Pavlyuchenkova	6	5	6
(Romania) Irina-Camelia Begu	4	7	1

=== Top half ===
First round
(Belarus) O Govortsova	2	1^{r}
Q	(Russia) V Diatchenko	6	2
(United States) A Riske	6	6
WC	(Russia) D Kasatkina	1	2
(Croatia) A Konjuh	3	4
6	(Russia) A Pavlyuchenkova	6	6
Q	(Ukraine) L Tsurenko	0	3
(Italy) C Giorgi	6	6
(Russia) E Vesnina	2	2
Q	(Czech Republic) K Siniaková	6	6
(France) K Mladenovic	6	7
7	(Czech Republic) Ka Plíšková	3	5

Second round
1	(Slovakia) D Cibulková	6	2	2
Q	(Russia) V Diatchenko	4	6	6
(United States) A Riske	2	2
6	(Russia) A Pavlyuchenkova	6	6
3	(Italy) F Pennetta	6^{4}	4
(Italy) C Giorgi	7^{7}	6
Q	(Czech Republic) K Siniaková	6	6
(France) K Mladenovic	1	1

Quarterfinals
Q	(Russia) V Diatchenko	1	6	3
6	(Russia) A Pavlyuchenkova	6	3	6
(Italy) C Giorgi	6^{3}	6	5
Q	(Czech Republic) K Siniaková	7^{7}	4	7

Semifinals
6	(Russia) A Pavlyuchenkova	6	6
Q	(Czech Republic) K Siniaková	2	2

=== Bottom half ===
First round
5	(Russia) S Kuznetsova	6	0
(Czech Republic) K Koukalová	1	0^{r}
Q	(Ukraine) K Kozlova	6	6
(Belarus) A Sasnovich	3	2
(Russia) A Panova	4	6	3
(Croatia) A Tomljanović	6	4	6
8	(France) C Garcia	4	2
WC	(Serbia) A Krunić	6	6
(Bulgaria) T Pironkova	6	6
(Montenegro) D Kovinić	2	2
(Croatia) D Vekić	6^{5}	6	3
(Romania) I-C Begu	7^{7}	1	6

Second round
5	(Russia) S Kuznetsova	3	6	6
Q	(Ukraine) K Kozlova	6	3	3
(Croatia) A Tomljanović	6^{4}	2
4	(Czech Republic) L Šafářová	7^{7}	6
WC	(Serbia) A Krunić	2	3
(Bulgaria) T Pironkova	6	6
(Romania) I-C Begu	6	6
2	(Russia) E Makarova	4	4

Quarterfinals
5	(Russia) S Kuznetsova	4	5
4	(Czech Republic) L Šafářová	6	7
(Bulgaria) T Pironkova	6	3	2
(Romania) I-C Begu	1	6	6

Semifinals
4	(Czech Republic) L Šafářová	6^{5}	6	3
(Romania) I-C Begu	7^{7}	1	6

== Qualifying ==
=== Seeds ===
1. (Ukraine) Lesia Tsurenko (qualified)
2. (Czech Republic) Kateřina Siniaková (qualified)
3. (Israel) Shahar Pe'er (qualifying competition)
4. (Russia) Vitalia Diatchenko (qualified)
5. (Turkey) Çağla Büyükakçay (qualifying competition)
6. (Russia) Evgeniya Rodina (qualifying competition)
7. (Poland) Paula Kania (qualifying competition)
8. (Ukraine) Kateryna Kozlova (qualified)

=== Qualifiers ===
1. (Ukraine) Lesia Tsurenko
2. (Czech Republic) Kateřina Siniaková
3. (Ukraine) Kateryna Kozlova
4. (Russia) Vitalia Diatchenko

=== Qualifying draw ===
==== First qualifier ====
First round
1	(Ukraine) Lesia Tsurenko	6	6
(Uzbekistan) Akgul Amanmuradova	4	4
WC	(Russia) Ekaterina Yashina	2	2
(United States) Bethanie Mattek-Sands	6	6
WC	(Russia) Polina Monova	6	7^{7}
WC	(Russia) Anna Kalinskaya	3	6^{3}
WC	(Russia) Aleksandra Pospelova	1	4
7	(Poland) Paula Kania	6	6

Second round
1	(Ukraine) Lesia Tsurenko	6	6
(United States) Bethanie Mattek-Sands	1	3
WC	(Russia) Polina Monova	3	6^{2}
7	(Poland) Paula Kania	6	7^{7}

Qualifying competition
1	(Ukraine) Lesia Tsurenko	4	6	7
7	(Poland) Paula Kania	6	4	5

==== Second qualifier ====
First round
2	(Czech Republic) Kateřina Siniaková	6	6
(Australia) Arina Rodionova	4	1
(Russia) Margarita Gasparyan	3	6	6
(Spain) Arantxa Parra Santonja	6	0	0
(Russia) Natela Dzalamidze	5	6^{5}
(Russia) Veronika Kudermetova	7	7^{7}
(Ukraine) Anastasiya Vasylyeva	3	2
5	(Turkey) Çağla Büyükakçay	6	6

Second round
2	(Czech Republic) Kateřina Siniaková	2	6	6
(Russia) Margarita Gasparyan	6	3	1
(Russia) Veronika Kudermetova	4	4
5	(Turkey) Çağla Büyükakçay	6	6

Qualifying competition
2	(Czech Republic) Kateřina Siniaková	6	6
5	(Turkey) Çağla Büyükakçay	3	1

==== Third qualifier ====
First round
3	(Israel) Shahar Pe'er	6	6
(Ukraine) Olga Savchuk	3	4
(Ukraine) Lyudmyla Kichenok	3	1^{r}
(Canada) Gabriela Dabrowski	6	2
(Ukraine) Olga Ianchuk	2	3
(Russia) Marta Sirotkina	6	6
(Russia) Valeria Solovyeva	2	6	3
8	(Ukraine) Kateryna Kozlova	6	2	6

Second round
3	(Israel) Shahar Pe'er	6	6
(Canada) Gabriela Dabrowski	4	3
(Russia) Marta Sirotkina	0	4
8	(Ukraine) Kateryna Kozlova	6	6

Qualifying competition
3	(Israel) Shahar Pe'er	4	3
8	(Ukraine) Kateryna Kozlova	6	6

==== Fourth qualifier ====
First round
4	(Russia) Vitalia Diatchenko	7	6
(Ukraine) Anhelina Kalinina	5	1
(Russia) Ekaterina Bychkova	6	6
WC	(Russia) Anastasia Bukhanko	2	0
(Uzbekistan) Nigina Abduraimova	3	6^{0}
(Russia) Marina Melnikova	6	7^{7}
(Sweden) Sofia Arvidsson	5	2
6	(Russia) Evgeniya Rodina	7	6

Second round
4	(Russia) Vitalia Diatchenko	7	6
(Russia) Ekaterina Bychkova	5	4
(Russia) Marina Melnikova	1	1
6	(Russia) Evgeniya Rodina	6	6

Qualifying competition
4	(Russia) Vitalia Diatchenko	7^{8}	6
6	(Russia) Evgeniya Rodina	6^{6}	1
