= 2015 Kremlin Cup – Women's singles =

Women's singles
- 2015 Kremlin Cup

Final
- Champion: (Russia) Svetlana Kuznetsova
- Runner-up: (Russia) Anastasia Pavlyuchenkova
- Score: 6–2, 6–1

Details
- Seeds: 8

Events
Singles	men	women
Doubles	men	women
- Kremlin Cup

Anastasia Pavlyuchenkova was the defending champion, but lost to Svetlana Kuznetsova in the final, 2–6, 1–6.

== Seeds ==
The top four seeds received a bye into the second round.

1. (Poland) Agnieszka Radwańska (withdrew)
2. (Czech Republic) Lucie Šafářová (second round)
3. (Italy) Flavia Pennetta (quarterfinals, withdrew)
4. (Germany) Angelique Kerber (withdrew)
5. (Spain) Carla Suárez Navarro (quarterfinals)
6. (Czech Republic) Karolína Plíšková (second round)
7. (Romania) Irina-Camelia Begu (second round)
8. (Slovakia) Anna Karolína Schmiedlová (second round)
9. (France) Kristina Mladenovic (second round)

== Draw ==
Key

- Q = Qualifier
- WC = Wild card
- LL = Lucky loser
- Alt = Alternate
- ITF = ITF entry
- PR = Protected ranking
- SR = Special ranking
- SE = Special exempt
- JE = Junior exempt
- JR = Junior Accelerator Programme entrant
- CO = College Accelerator Programme entrant
- NG = Next Gen Accelerator Program entrant
- w/o = Walkover
- r = Retired
- d = Defaulted

=== Finals ===
Semifinals
(Ukraine) Lesia Tsurenko	2	4
(Russia) Svetlana Kuznetsova	6	6
Q	(Russia) Daria Kasatkina	6	2	4
(Russia) Anastasia Pavlyuchenkova	2	6	6

Final
(Russia) Svetlana Kuznetsova	6	6
(Russia) Anastasia Pavlyuchenkova	2	1

=== Top half ===
First round
(Russia) D Gavrilova	3	6	7
(France) A Cornet	6	3	5
(Serbia) A Krunić	3	1
(Ukraine) L Tsurenko	6	6
Q	(Belarus) A Sasnovich	4	3
8	(Slovakia) AK Schmiedlová	6	6
(Russia) S Kuznetsova	6	6
(Czech Republic) K Siniaková	0	3
(Belarus) O Govortsova	6^{2}	4
Q	(Latvia) A Sevastova	7^{7}	6
(Romania) A Dulgheru	4	7	6^{7}
6/WC	(Czech Republic) Ka Plíšková	6	5	7^{9}

Second round
3/WC	(Italy) F Pennetta	6	6
(Russia) D Gavrilova	2	4
(Ukraine) L Tsurenko	7^{7}	4	6
8	(Slovakia) AK Schmiedlová	6^{5}	6	3
Q	(Czech Republic) K Koukalová	4	2
(Russia) S Kuznetsova	6	6
Q	(Latvia) A Sevastova	6	7^{12}
6/WC	(Czech Republic) Ka Plíšková	3	6^{10}

Quarterfinals
3/WC	(Italy) F Pennetta
(Ukraine) L Tsurenko	w/o
(Russia) S Kuznetsova	5	6	6
Q	(Latvia) A Sevastova	7	1	3

Semifinals
(Ukraine) L Tsurenko	2	4
(Russia) S Kuznetsova	6	6

=== Bottom half ===
First round
7	(Romania) I-C Begu	1	7^{7}	6
(Bulgaria) T Pironkova	6	6^{2}	2
LL	(Poland) P Kania	5	6	3
Q	(Russia) D Kasatkina	7	2	6
(Slovakia) D Cibulková	7	6
WC	(Russia) E Vesnina	5	1
9	(France) K Mladenovic	7^{7}	6
LL	(Romania) A Bogdan	6^{4}	3
(United States) V Lepchenko	5	6^{4}
(Russia) M Gasparyan	7	7^{7}
(Romania) M Niculescu	5	6	4
(Russia) A Pavlyuchenkova	7	0	6

Second round
7	(Romania) I-C Begu	3	6	3
Q	(Russia) D Kasatkina	6	3	6
(Slovakia) D Cibulková	4	5
5	(Spain) C Suárez Navarro	6	7
9	(France) K Mladenovic	2	3
(Russia) M Gasparyan	6	6
(Russia) A Pavlyuchenkova	6	6^{2}	6
2	(Czech Republic) L Šafářová	1	7^{7}	3

Quarterfinals
Q	(Russia) D Kasatkina	6	6
5	(Spain) C Suárez Navarro	1	2
(Russia) M Gasparyan	1	3
(Russia) A Pavlyuchenkova	6	6

Semifinals
Q	(Russia) D Kasatkina	6	2	4
(Russia) A Pavlyuchenkova	2	6	6

== Qualifying ==
=== Seeds ===
1. (Latvia) Jeļena Ostapenko (second round, retired)
2. (Russia) Evgeniya Rodina (first round, retired)
3. (Belarus) Aliaksandra Sasnovich (qualified)
4. (Russia) Daria Kasatkina (qualified)
5. (Czech Republic) Klára Koukalová (qualified)
6. (Croatia) Donna Vekić (first round)
7. (Romania) Patricia Maria Țig (first round)
8. (Estonia) Kaia Kanepi (first round)

=== Qualifiers ===
1. (Latvia) Anastasija Sevastova
2. (Czech Republic) Klára Koukalová
3. (Belarus) Aliaksandra Sasnovich
4. (Russia) Daria Kasatkina

=== Lucky losers ===
1. (Poland) Paula Kania
2. (Romania) Ana Bogdan

=== Draw ===
==== First qualifier ====
First round
1	(Latvia) Jeļena Ostapenko	7^{7}	6
(Russia) Alexandra Panova	6^{4}	1
(Latvia) Anastasija Sevastova	7	1	6
(Japan) Risa Ozaki	5	6	0
Alt	(Russia) Natalia Vikhlyantseva	6	6
(Spain) Paula Badosa Gibert	3	1
(Canada) Gabriela Dabrowski	6	6
6	(Croatia) Donna Vekić	2	4

Second round
1	(Latvia) Jeļena Ostapenko	3	1^{r}
(Latvia) Anastasija Sevastova	6	3
Alt	(Russia) Natalia Vikhlyantseva	3	6	1
(Canada) Gabriela Dabrowski	6	3	6

Qualifying competition
(Latvia) Anastasija Sevastova	6	5	6
(Canada) Gabriela Dabrowski	4	7	2

==== Second qualifier ====
First round
2	(Russia) Evgeniya Rodina	2	0^{r}
(Russia) Vera Dushevina	6	4
(Russia) Marina Melnikova	1	4
(Ukraine) Olga Savchuk	6	6
(Turkey) İpek Soylu	7^{7}	7^{7}
(Ukraine) Anhelina Kalinina	6^{5}	6^{4}
WC	(Russia) Aleksandra Pospelova	3	6	0
5	(Czech Republic) Klára Koukalová	6	3	6

Second round
(Russia) Vera Dushevina	6	7^{7}
(Ukraine) Olga Savchuk	2	6^{2}
(Turkey) İpek Soylu	6^{2}	2
5	(Czech Republic) Klára Koukalová	7^{7}	6

Qualifying competition
(Russia) Vera Dushevina	4	6^{4}
5	(Czech Republic) Klára Koukalová	6	7^{7}

==== Third qualifier ====
First round
3	(Belarus) Aliaksandra Sasnovich	6	6
(Croatia) Petra Martić	2	2
(Uzbekistan) Nigina Abduraimova	6	6
(Argentina) María Irigoyen	3	2
WC	(Russia) Anna Blinkova	6	6
WC	(Russia) Olesya Pervushina	4	2
(Romania) Ana Bogdan	6	6
7	(Romania) Patricia Maria Țig	4	1

Second round
3	(Belarus) Aliaksandra Sasnovich	6^{5}	6	6
(Uzbekistan) Nigina Abduraimova	7^{7}	1	4
WC	(Russia) Anna Blinkova	5	4
(Romania) Ana Bogdan	7	6

Qualifying competition
3	(Belarus) Aliaksandra Sasnovich	6	7^{7}
(Romania) Ana Bogdan	3	6^{4}

==== Fourth qualifier ====
First round
4	(Russia) Daria Kasatkina	6	6
(Ukraine) Kateryna Kozlova	2	4
(Ukraine) Yuliya Beygelzimer	6	2	5
WC	(Russia) Anna Kalinskaya	1	6	7
(Ukraine) Maryna Zanevska	7	6
(Spain) Laura Pous Tió	5	4
(Poland) Paula Kania	1	7^{7}	6
8	(Estonia) Kaia Kanepi	6	6^{4}	3

Second round
4	(Russia) Daria Kasatkina	6	6
WC	(Russia) Anna Kalinskaya	4	3
(Ukraine) Maryna Zanevska	4	4
(Poland) Paula Kania	6	6

Qualifying competition
4	(Russia) Daria Kasatkina	6	6
(Poland) Paula Kania	2	1
