= 2015 Kremlin Cup – Men's doubles =

Men's doubles
- 2015 Kremlin Cup

Final
- Champions: (Russia) Andrey Rublev (Russia) Dmitry Tursunov
- Runners-up: (Moldova) Radu Albot (Czech Republic) František Čermák
- Score: 2–6, 6–1, [10–6]

Details
- Draw: 16
- Seeds: 4

Events
Singles	men	women
Doubles	men	women
← 2014 ·	Kremlin Cup	· 2016 →

Andrey Rublev and Dmitry Tursunov defeated the defending champion František Čermák and his partner Radu Albot in the final, 2–6, 6–1, [10–6] to win the men's doubles tennis title at the 2015 Kremlin Cup.

Čermák and Jiří Veselý were the reigning champions, but Veselý chose not to participate.

This tournament marked the first ATP Tour appearance of future singles world No. 1 and US Open champion Daniil Medvedev; partnering Aslan Karatsev, he lost in the quarterfinals to Čermák and Albot.

== Seeds ==
1. (Austria) Philipp Oswald / (Canada) Adil Shamasdin (first round)
2. (Belarus) Sergey Betov / (Russia) Mikhail Elgin (quarterfinals)
3. (Belarus) Aliaksandr Bury / (Uzbekistan) Denis Istomin (first round)
4. (Australia) Rameez Junaid / (Slovakia) Igor Zelenay (semifinals)

== Draw ==
=== Key ===
- Q = Qualifier
- WC = Wild card
- LL = Lucky loser
- Alt = Alternate
- SE = Special exempt
- PR = Protected ranking
- ITF = ITF entry
- JE = Junior exempt
- w/o = Walkover
- r = Retired
- d = Defaulted
- SR = Special ranking

=== Draw ===
First round
1	(Austria) P Oswald (Canada) A Shamasdin	6^{4}	7^{8}	[8]
(Lithuania) R Berankis (Russia) T Gabashvili	7^{7}	6^{6}	[10]
(Germany) G Kretschmer (Germany) A Satschko	w/o
(Spain) P Riba (Portugal) J Sousa
3	(Belarus) A Bury (Uzbekistan) D Istomin	6	6^{2}	[1]
(Russia) A Karatsev (Russia) D Medvedev	3	7^{7}	[10]
(Moldova) R Albot (Czech Republic) F Čermák	7	3	[10]
(United Kingdom) A Bedene (Spain) D Gimeno-Traver	5	6	[3]
PR	(Poland) T Bednarek (France) F Martin	6	6
WC	(Russia) R Muzaev (Russia) A Zaitcev	3	3
(Russia) E Donskoy (Russia) K Kravchuk	4	2
4	(Australia) R Junaid (Slovakia) I Zelenay	6	6
WC	(Russia) A Rublev (Russia) D Tursunov	w/o
(Kazakhstan) M Kukushkin (Russia) A Kuznetsov
(Russia) P Davydenko (Russia) A Vatutin	2	3
2	(Belarus) S Betov (Russia) M Elgin	6	6

Quarterfinals
(Lithuania) R Berankis (Russia) T Gabashvili	6	1	[10]
(Germany) G Kretschmer (Germany) A Satschko	2	6	[5]
(Russia) A Karatsev (Russia) D Medvedev	2	3
(Moldova) R Albot (Czech Republic) F Čermák	6	6
PR	(Poland) T Bednarek (France) F Martin	6^{6}	3
4	(Australia) R Junaid (Slovakia) I Zelenay	7^{8}	6
WC	(Russia) A Rublev (Russia) D Tursunov	2	6	[10]
2	(Belarus) S Betov (Russia) M Elgin	6	3	[3]

Semifinals
(Lithuania) R Berankis (Russia) T Gabashvili	6^{4}	3
(Moldova) R Albot (Czech Republic) F Čermák	7^{7}	6
4	(Australia) R Junaid (Slovakia) I Zelenay	5	6	[7]
WC	(Russia) A Rublev (Russia) D Tursunov	7	1	[10]

Final
(Moldova) R Albot (Czech Republic) F Čermák	6	1	[6]
WC	(Russia) A Rublev (Russia) D Tursunov	2	6	[10]
