= 2017 Kremlin Cup – Men's singles =

Men's singles
- 2017 Kremlin Cup

Final
- Champion: (Bosnia and Herzegovina) Damir Džumhur
- Runner-up: (Lithuania) Ričardas Berankis
- Score: 6–2, 1–6, 6–4

Details
- Draw: 28 (4 Q / 3 WC )
- Seeds: 8

Events
Singles	men	women
Doubles	men	women
← 2016 ·	Kremlin Cup	· 2018 →

Pablo Carreño Busta was the defending champion, but lost to Daniil Medvedev in the second round.

Damir Džumhur won the title, defeating Ričardas Berankis in the final, 6–2, 1–6, 6–4.

== Seeds ==
The top four seeds received a bye into the second round.

1. (Spain) Pablo Carreño Busta (second round)
2. (Spain) Albert Ramos Viñolas (second round)
3. (France) Adrian Mannarino (semifinals)
4. (Germany) Philipp Kohlschreiber (second round)
5. (Russia) Andrey Rublev (first round)
6. (Bosnia and Herzegovina) Damir Džumhur (champion)
7. (Italy) Paolo Lorenzi (first round)
8. (Russia) Karen Khachanov (withdrew)

== Draw ==
=== Key ===
- Q = Qualifier
- WC = Wild card
- LL = Lucky loser
- Alt = Alternate
- SE = Special exempt
- PR = Protected ranking
- ITF = ITF entry
- JE = Junior exempt
- w/o = Walkover
- r = Retired
- d = Defaulted
- SR = Special ranking

=== Finals ===
Semifinals
Q	(Bosnia and Herzegovina) Mirza Bašić	0	6^{9}
6	(Bosnia and Herzegovina) Damir Džumhur	6	7^{11}
3	(France) Adrian Mannarino	6	4	1
PR	(Lithuania) Ričardas Berankis	3	6	6

Final
6	(Bosnia and Herzegovina) Damir Džumhur	6	1	6
PR	(Lithuania) Ričardas Berankis	2	6	4

=== Top half ===
First round
(Russia) A Kuznetsov	4	6	6^{6}
(Russia) D Medvedev	6	2	7^{8}
Q	(Bosnia and Herzegovina) M Bašić	3	6	5
(Slovenia) B Kavčič	6	3	1^{r}
(Serbia) L Đere	4	7^{11}	6
7	(Italy) P Lorenzi	6	6^{9}	4
(Czech Republic) J Veselý	3	1^{r}
(Italy) A Seppi	6	4
Q	(India) Y Bhambri	6	6
WC	(Russia) R Safiullin	2	4
(Italy) T Fabbiano	3	6	2
6	(Bosnia and Herzegovina) D Džumhur	6	0	6

Second round
1	(Spain) P Carreño Busta	3	3
(Russia) D Medvedev	6	6
Q	(Bosnia and Herzegovina) M Bašić	6	6
(Serbia) L Đere	1	1
4	(Germany) P Kohlschreiber	7^{7}	6^{1}	3
(Italy) A Seppi	6^{4}	7^{7}	6
Q	(India) Y Bhambri	6	5	4
6	(Bosnia and Herzegovina) D Džumhur	4	7	6

Quarterfinals
(Russia) D Medvedev	6	4	1
Q	(Bosnia and Herzegovina) M Bašić	3	6	6
(Italy) A Seppi	6	2	4
6	(Bosnia and Herzegovina) D Džumhur	4	6	6

Semifinals
Q	(Bosnia and Herzegovina) M Bašić	0	6^{9}
6	(Bosnia and Herzegovina) D Džumhur	6	7^{11}

=== Bottom half ===
First round
(Croatia) B Ćorić	3	2
(Israel) D Sela	6	6
(Russia) E Donskoy	3	5
(Brazil) R Dutra Silva	6	7
Q	(Czech Republic) L Rosol	4	6	7^{7}
WC	(Russia) K Kravchuk	6	3	6^{3}
5	(Russia) A Rublev	5	6^{6}
Q	(Serbia) F Krajinović	7	7^{8}
(Serbia) D Lajović	3	6^{2}
PR	(Lithuania) R Berankis	6	7^{7}
LL	(Kazakhstan) A Bublik	6	6
WC	(Russia) T Gabashvili	3	4

Second round
(Israel) D Sela	7	6
(Brazil) R Dutra Silva	5	1
Q	(Czech Republic) L Rosol	3	6^{4}
3	(France) A Mannarino	6	7^{7}
Q	(Serbia) F Krajinović	6	5	4
PR	(Lithuania) R Berankis	3	7	6
LL	(Kazakhstan) A Bublik	4	7	6
2	(Spain) A Ramos Viñolas	6	5	2

Quarterfinals
(Israel) D Sela	7^{8}	1	2
3	(France) A Mannarino	6^{6}	6	6
PR	(Lithuania) R Berankis	7	6
LL	(Kazakhstan) A Bublik	5	1

Semifinals
3	(France) A Mannarino	6	4	1
PR	(Lithuania) R Berankis	3	6	6

== Qualifying ==
=== Seeds ===
1. (Serbia) Filip Krajinović (qualified)
2. (Kazakhstan) Mikhail Kukushkin (qualifying competition)
3. (Kazakhstan) Alexander Bublik (qualifying competition, lucky loser)
4. (India) Yuki Bhambri (qualified)
5. (Russia) Alexey Vatutin (qualifying competition)
6. (Czech Republic) Lukáš Rosol (qualified)
7. (Bosnia and Herzegovina) Mirza Bašić (qualified)
8. (Belarus) Uladzimir Ignatik (qualifying competition)

=== Qualifiers ===
1. (Serbia) Filip Krajinović
2. (Bosnia and Herzegovina) Mirza Bašić
3. (Czech Republic) Lukáš Rosol
4. (India) Yuki Bhambri

=== Lucky loser ===
1. (Kazakhstan) Alexander Bublik

=== Qualifying draw ===
==== First qualifier ====
First round
1	(Serbia) Filip Krajinović	7^{7}	6
(Australia) Marc Polmans	6^{2}	3
(Czech Republic) Václav Šafránek	4	5
8	(Belarus) Uladzimir Ignatik	6	7

Qualifying competition
1	(Serbia) Filip Krajinović	6^{10}	7	6
8	(Belarus) Uladzimir Ignatik	7^{12}	5	3

==== Second qualifier ====
First round
2	(Kazakhstan) Mikhail Kukushkin	4	6	7^{7}
(Uzbekistan) Sanjar Fayziev	6	1	6^{2}
Alt	(Russia) Ivan Gakhov	4	3
7	(Bosnia and Herzegovina) Mirza Bašić	6	6

Qualifying competition
2	(Kazakhstan) Mikhail Kukushkin	6^{4}	3
7	(Bosnia and Herzegovina) Mirza Bašić	7^{7}	6

==== Third qualifier ====
First round
3	(Kazakhstan) Alexander Bublik	6	6
(South Africa) Lloyd Harris	3	4
WC	(Russia) Artem Dubrivnyy	4	4
6	(Czech Republic) Lukáš Rosol	6	6

Qualifying competition
3	(Kazakhstan) Alexander Bublik	4	5
6	(Czech Republic) Lukáš Rosol	6	7

==== Fourth qualifier ====
First round
4	(India) Yuki Bhambri	6	6
(Serbia) Danilo Petrović	4	4
WC	(Russia) Denis Matsukevich	6	4	2
5	(Russia) Alexey Vatutin	2	6	6

Qualifying competition
4	(India) Yuki Bhambri	7	6
5	(Russia) Alexey Vatutin	5	4
