= 2016 Kremlin Cup – Women's singles =

Women's singles
- 2016 Kremlin Cup

Final
- Champion: (Russia) Svetlana Kuznetsova
- Runner-up: (Australia) Daria Gavrilova
- Score: 6–2, 6–1

Details
- Seeds: 8

Events
Singles	men	women
Doubles	men	women
- Kremlin Cup

Svetlana Kuznetsova was the defending champion and successfully defended her title, defeating Daria Gavrilova in the final, 6–2, 6–1.

By claiming the title, Kuznetsova became the final qualifier for the 2016 WTA Finals, overtaking Johanna Konta on the race list.

== Seeds ==
The top four seeds received a bye into the second round.

1. (Russia) Svetlana Kuznetsova (champion)
2. (Slovakia) Dominika Cibulková (withdrew)
3. (Spain) Carla Suárez Navarro (second round, retired)
4. (Ukraine) Elina Svitolina (semifinals)
5. (Russia) Elena Vesnina (second round)
6. (Czech Republic) Barbora Strýcová (first round)
7. (Russia) Anastasia Pavlyuchenkova (quarterfinals)
8. (Russia) Daria Kasatkina (quarterfinals)
9. (Hungary) Tímea Babos (quarterfinals)

== Draw ==
Key

- Q = Qualifier
- WC = Wild card
- LL = Lucky loser
- Alt = Alternate
- ITF = ITF entry
- PR = Protected ranking
- SR = Special ranking
- SE = Special exempt
- JE = Junior exempt
- JR = Junior Accelerator Programme entrant
- CO = College Accelerator Programme entrant
- NG = Next Gen Accelerator Program entrant
- w/o = Walkover
- r = Retired
- d = Defaulted

=== Finals ===
Semifinals
1/WC	(Russia) Svetlana Kuznetsova	6	6^{2}	6
4	(Ukraine) Elina Svitolina	1	7^{7}	4
(Germany) Julia Görges	5	1
(Australia) Daria Gavrilova	7	6

Final
1/WC	(Russia) Svetlana Kuznetsova	6	6
(Australia) Daria Gavrilova	2	1

=== Top half ===
First round
(France) A Cornet	7^{8}	6
(United States) S Rogers	6^{6}	3
(France) K Mladenovic	6	6
WC	(Russia) A Kalinskaya	4	2
(Romania) I-C Begu	2	7^{7}	5
9	(Hungary) T Babos	6	6^{2}	7
Q	(Ukraine) L Tsurenko	3	0^{r}
(Kazakhstan) Y Putintseva	6	0
(Latvia) A Sevastova	6	1	6^{10}
Q	(Russia) A Blinkova	4	6	7^{12}
LL	(Croatia) A Konjuh	6	1	6
6	(Czech Republic) B Strýcová	4	6	2

Second round
1/WC	(Russia) S Kuznetsova	6	7
(France) A Cornet	4	5
(France) K Mladenovic	1	4
9	(Hungary) T Babos	6	6
4	(Ukraine) E Svitolina	6	6
(Kazakhstan) Y Putintseva	2	2
Q	(Russia) A Blinkova
LL	(Croatia) A Konjuh	w/o

Quarterfinals
1/WC	(Russia) S Kuznetsova	7	6^{2}	6
9	(Hungary) T Babos	5	7^{7}	2
4	(Ukraine) E Svitolina	6	6
LL	(Croatia) A Konjuh	1	1

Semifinals
1/WC	(Russia) S Kuznetsova	6	6^{2}	6
4	(Ukraine) E Svitolina	1	7^{7}	4

=== Bottom half ===
First round
8	(Russia) D Kasatkina	6	6
(Switzerland) B Bencic	4	1
(Russia) E Makarova	7	6
Q	(United States) N Gibbs	5	1
(Montenegro) D Kovinić	6^{3}	3
(Germany) J Görges	7^{7}	6
7	(Russia) A Pavlyuchenkova	7^{7}	5	7
Q	(Czech Republic) K Siniaková	6^{2}	7	5
(Latvia) J Ostapenko	3	3
(Serbia) J Janković	6	6
(Czech Republic) L Šafářová	2	2
(Australia) D Gavrilova	6	6

Second round
8	(Russia) D Kasatkina	6	6
(Russia) E Makarova	4	1
(Germany) J Görges	7	6
5	(Russia) E Vesnina	5	0
7	(Russia) A Pavlyuchenkova	6	6
(Serbia) J Janković	1	4
(Australia) D Gavrilova	6	3
3	(Spain) C Suárez Navarro	4	0^{r}

Quarterfinals
8	(Russia) D Kasatkina	5	1
(Germany) J Görges	7	6
7	(Russia) A Pavlyuchenkova	5	6	3
(Australia) D Gavrilova	7	4	6

Semifinals
(Germany) J Görges	5	1
(Australia) D Gavrilova	7	6

== Qualifying ==
=== Seeds ===
1. (Ukraine) Lesia Tsurenko (qualified)
2. (Czech Republic) Kateřina Siniaková (qualified)
3. (Croatia) Ana Konjuh (qualifying competition, lucky loser)
4. (Turkey) Çağla Büyükakçay (second round)
5. (United States) Nicole Gibbs (qualified)
6. (Italy) Camila Giorgi (second round)
7. (Russia) Irina Khromacheva (qualifying competition)
8. (Russia) Evgeniya Rodina (second round)

=== Qualifiers ===
1. (Ukraine) Lesia Tsurenko
2. (Czech Republic) Kateřina Siniaková
3. (United States) Nicole Gibbs
4. (Russia) Anna Blinkova

=== Lucky losers ===
1. (Croatia) Ana Konjuh

=== Draw ===
==== First qualifier ====
First round
1	(Ukraine) Lesia Tsurenko	3	6	6
(Uzbekistan) Nigina Abduraimova	6	2	2
(Russia) Elizaveta Kulichkova	6	6
(Belarus) Aryna Sabalenka	4	1
(Paraguay) Verónica Cepede Royg	7	6
(Czech Republic) Lucie Hradecká	5	1
(Russia) Victoria Kamenskaya	1	0
7	(Russia) Irina Khromacheva	6	6

Second round
1	(Ukraine) Lesia Tsurenko	7^{7}	6
(Russia) Elizaveta Kulichkova	6^{4}	3
(Paraguay) Verónica Cepede Royg	7	0	2
7	(Russia) Irina Khromacheva	5	6	6

Qualifying competition
1	(Ukraine) Lesia Tsurenko	6	6
7	(Russia) Irina Khromacheva	1	2

==== Second qualifier ====
First round
2	(Czech Republic) Kateřina Siniaková	1	6	6
(Russia) Marina Melnikova	6	4	2
(Russia) Polina Leykina	6	6
(Russia) Veronika Kudermetova	0	2
(Bulgaria) Viktoriya Tomova	6	6
WC	(Russia) Amina Anshba	4	1
(Belarus) Olga Govortsova	1	2
8	(Russia) Evgeniya Rodina	6	6

Second round
2	(Czech Republic) Kateřina Siniaková	6	6
(Russia) Polina Leykina	4	2
(Bulgaria) Viktoriya Tomova	6	6
8	(Russia) Evgeniya Rodina	4	0

Qualifying competition
2	(Czech Republic) Kateřina Siniaková	6	6
(Bulgaria) Viktoriya Tomova	4	2

==== Third qualifier ====
First round
3	(Croatia) Ana Konjuh	6	6
(Russia) Ekaterina Alexandrova	1	4
(Czech Republic) Tereza Martincová	6	6
(Russia) Anastasia Pivovarova	3	2
(Poland) Paula Kania	7^{7}	5	6
WC	(Russia) Anastasia Gasanova	6^{3}	7	1
(Russia) Natalia Vikhlyantseva	4	6	3
5	(United States) Nicole Gibbs	6	4	6

Second round
3	(Croatia) Ana Konjuh	4
(Czech Republic) Tereza Martincová	0^{r}
(Poland) Paula Kania	4	1
5	(United States) Nicole Gibbs	6	6

Qualifying competition
3	(Croatia) Ana Konjuh	5	7	6^{1}
5	(United States) Nicole Gibbs	7	5	7^{7}

==== Fourth qualifier ====
First round
4	(Turkey) Çağla Büyükakçay	1	7^{7}	6
(Russia) Valeriya Solovyeva	6	6^{2}	1
WC	(Russia) Anna Blinkova	6	6
(Bulgaria) Elitsa Kostova	0	4
WC	(Russia) Olesya Pervushina	2	5
(Argentina) Nadia Podoroska	6	7
(Belarus) Aliaksandra Sasnovich	6	0	3
6	(Italy) Camila Giorgi	4	6	6

Second round
4	(Turkey) Çağla Büyükakçay	2	3
WC	(Russia) Anna Blinkova	6	6
(Argentina) Nadia Podoroska	0	6	6
6	(Italy) Camila Giorgi	6	4	4

Qualifying competition
WC	(Russia) Anna Blinkova	6	6
(Argentina) Nadia Podoroska	2	1
