= 2014 Kremlin Cup – Men's doubles =

Men's doubles
- 2014 Kremlin Cup

Final
- Champions: (Czech Republic) František Čermák (Czech Republic) Jiří Veselý
- Runners-up: (Australia) Sam Groth (Australia) Chris Guccione
- Score: 7–6^{(7–2)}, 7–5

Details
- Draw: 16
- Seeds: 4

Events
Singles	men	women
Doubles	men	women
← 2013 ·	Kremlin Cup	· 2015 →

Mikhail Elgin and Denis Istomin were the defending champions, but Istomin chose not to participate this year. Elgin played alongside Sergey Betov and lost in the first round to Sam Groth and Chris Guccione.
František Čermák and Jiří Veselý won the title, defeating Sam Groth and Chris Guccione in the final, 7–6^{(7–2)}, 7–5.

== Seeds ==
1. (Croatia) Ivan Dodig / (Brazil) Marcelo Melo (first round)
2. (Australia) Sam Groth / (Australia) Chris Guccione (final)
3. (United Kingdom) Colin Fleming / (United Kingdom) Jonathan Marray (first round)
4. (Italy) Daniele Bracciali / (Italy) Potito Starace (quarterfinals)

== Draw ==
=== Key ===
- Q = Qualifier
- WC = Wild card
- LL = Lucky loser
- Alt = Alternate
- SE = Special exempt
- PR = Protected ranking
- ITF = ITF entry
- JE = Junior exempt
- w/o = Walkover
- r = Retired
- d = Defaulted
- SR = Special ranking

=== Draw ===
First round
1	(Croatia) I Dodig (Brazil) M Melo	4	6	[8]
(Italy) P Lorenzi (Italy) A Seppi	6	0	[10]
(Czech Republic) F Čermák (Czech Republic) J Veselý	4	6	[13]
(Poland) T Bednarek (Australia) R Junaid	6	3	[11]
4	(Italy) D Bracciali (Italy) P Starace	7^{7}	3	[10]
(Germany) A Satschko (Canada) A Shamasdin	6^{2}	6	[5]
WC	(Russia) K Kravchuk (Russia) A Kuznetsov	6	6
(United Kingdom) K Skupski (United Kingdom) N Skupski	3	4
(United States) J Cerretani (Italy) F Fognini	6	2	[10]
(Moldova) R Albot (Kazakhstan) M Kukushkin	0	6	[7]
WC	(Russia) E Donskoy (Russia) A Rublev	6	4	[10]
3	(United Kingdom) C Fleming (United Kingdom) J Marray	4	6	[7]
(Belarus) A Bury (Tunisia) M Jaziri	6	3	[6]
(Serbia) D Lajović (Croatia) F Škugor	3	6	[10]
(Belarus) S Betov (Russia) M Elgin	3	4
2	(Australia) S Groth (Australia) C Guccione	6	6

Quarterfinals
(Italy) P Lorenzi (Italy) A Seppi	4	4
(Czech Republic) F Čermák (Czech Republic) J Veselý	6	6
4	(Italy) D Bracciali (Italy) P Starace	0	4
WC	(Russia) K Kravchuk (Russia) A Kuznetsov	6	6
(United States) J Cerretani (Italy) F Fognini	5	6	[6]
WC	(Russia) E Donskoy (Russia) A Rublev	7	4	[10]
(Serbia) D Lajović (Croatia) F Škugor	6	1	[7]
2	(Australia) S Groth (Australia) C Guccione	4	6	[10]

Semifinals
(Czech Republic) F Čermák (Czech Republic) J Veselý	6	6
WC	(Russia) K Kravchuk (Russia) A Kuznetsov	3	4
WC	(Russia) E Donskoy (Russia) A Rublev	5	2
2	(Australia) S Groth (Australia) C Guccione	7	6

Final
(Czech Republic) F Čermák (Czech Republic) J Veselý	7^{7}	7
2	(Australia) S Groth (Australia) C Guccione	6^{2}	5
