= 2015 Kremlin Cup =

- Date: 19–25 October
- Edition: 26th (men) / 20th (women)
- Surface: Hard
- Location: Moscow, Russia
- Venue: Olympic Stadium

Champions

Men's singles
- (Croatia) Marin Čilić

Women's singles
- (Russia) Svetlana Kuznetsova

Men's doubles
- (Russia) Andrey Rublev / (Russia) Dmitry Tursunov

Women's doubles
- (Russia) Daria Kasatkina / (Russia) Elena Vesnina
- Kremlin Cup

The 2015 Kremlin Cup was a tennis tournament played on indoor hard courts. It was the 26th edition of the Kremlin Cup for the men and the 20th edition for the women. The tournament was part of the ATP World Tour 250 Series of the 2015 ATP World Tour, and of the Premier Series of the 2015 WTA Tour. It was held at the Olympic Stadium in Moscow, Russia, from 19 October through 25 October 2015.

== Points and prize money ==
=== Point distribution ===
Event	W	F	SF	QF	Round of 16	Round of 32	Q	Q3	Q2	Q1
Singles	470	305	185	100	55	1	25	18	13	1
Doubles	470	305	185	100	1	—N/a	—N/a	—N/a	—N/a	—N/a

=== Prize money ===
Event	W	F	SF	QF	Round of 16	Round of 32	Q3	Q2	Q1
Singles	$131,230	$70,080	$37,430	$20,120	$10,790	$6,846	$3,075	$1,636	$910
Doubles	$41,050	$21,930	$11,985	$6,100	$3,310	—N/a	—N/a	—N/a	—N/a

== ATP singles main-draw entrants ==
=== Seeds ===
Country	Player	Rank^{1}	Seed
CRO	Marin Čilić	12	1
ESP	Roberto Bautista Agut	23	2
SRB	Viktor Troicki	24	3
GER	Philipp Kohlschreiber	31	4
URU	Pablo Cuevas	35	5
CRO	Borna Ćorić	40	6
POR	João Sousa	45	7
KAZ	Mikhail Kukushkin	50	8

- Rankings are as of October 12, 2015

=== Other entrants ===
The following players received wildcards into the singles main draw:

- (Russia) Evgeny Donskoy
- (Turkey) Cem İlkel
- (Russia) Andrey Rublev

The following players received entry from the qualifying draw:

- (Japan) Tatsuma Ito
- (Russia) Aslan Karatsev
- (Serbia) Dušan Lajović
- (Spain) Pere Riba

=== Withdrawals ===
Before the tournament

- (Spain) Pablo Andújar →replaced by (Russia) Mikhail Youzhny
- (Spain) Marcel Granollers →replaced by (Russia) Andrey Kuznetsov

=== Retirements ===
- (Italy) Simone Bolelli (leg injury)
- (Spain) Pere Riba (leg injury)

== ATP doubles main-draw entrants ==
=== Seeds ===
Country	Player	Country	Player	Rank^{1}	Seed
AUT	Philipp Oswald	CAN	Adil Shamasdin	116	1
BLR	Sergey Betov	RUS	Mikhail Elgin	142	2
BLR	Aliaksandr Bury	UZB	Denis Istomin	156	3
AUS	Rameez Junaid	SVK	Igor Zelenay	161	4

- ^{1} Rankings are as of October 12, 2015

=== Other entrants ===
The following pairs received wildcards into the doubles main draw:

- (Russia) Richard Muzaev / (Russia) Anton Zaitcev
- (Russia) Andrey Rublev / (Russia) Dmitry Tursunov

=== Withdrawals ===
Before the tournament

- (Spain) Pere Riba (leg injury)

== WTA singles main-draw entrants ==
=== Seeds ===
Country	Player	Rank^{1}	Seed
~~POL~~	~~Agnieszka Radwańska~~	~~6~~	~~1~~
CZE	Lucie Šafářová	7	2
ITA	Flavia Pennetta	8	3
~~GER~~	~~Angelique Kerber~~	~~9~~	~~4~~
ESP	Carla Suárez Navarro	13	5
CZE	Karolína Plíšková	15	6
ROU	Irina-Camelia Begu	25	7
SVK	Anna Karolína Schmiedlová	26	8
FRA	Kristina Mladenovic	27	9

- Rankings are as of October 12, 2015

=== Other entrants ===
The following players received wildcards into the singles main draw:

- (Italy) Flavia Pennetta
- (Czech Republic) Karolína Plíšková
- (Russia) Elena Vesnina

The following players received entry from the qualifying draw:

- (Russia) Daria Kasatkina
- (Czech Republic) Klára Koukalová
- (Belarus) Aliaksandra Sasnovich
- (Latvia) Anastasija Sevastova

The following players received entry as lucky losers:

- (Romania) Ana Bogdan
- (Poland) Paula Kania

=== Withdrawals ===
Before the tournament

- (Germany) Angelique Kerber (back injury)→replaced by (Romania) Ana Bogdan
- (Czech Republic) Petra Kvitová →replaced by (Czech Republic) Kateřina Siniaková
- (Italy) Karin Knapp →replaced by (Belarus) Olga Govortsova
- (Russia) Ekaterina Makarova →replaced by (Serbia) Aleksandra Krunić
- (Poland) Agnieszka Radwańska (right shoulder injury) →replaced by (Poland) Paula Kania

During the tournament

- (Italy) Flavia Pennetta (right foot injury)

== WTA doubles main-draw entrants ==
=== Seeds ===
Country	Player	Country	Player	Rank^{1}	Seed
GER	Anna-Lena Grönefeld	POL	Alicja Rosolska	70	1
ROU	Irina-Camelia Begu	ROU	Monica Niculescu	77	2
SLO	Andreja Klepač	CZE	Kateřina Siniaková	86	3
UKR	Lyudmyla Kichenok	UKR	Olga Savchuk	102	4

- ^{1} Rankings are as of October 12, 2015

=== Other entrants ===
The following pairs received wildcards into the doubles main draw:

- (Russia) Anastasia Bukhanko / (Croatia) Iva Majoli
- (Russia) Daria Kasatkina / (Russia) Elena Vesnina

== Champions ==
=== Men's singles ===
- (Croatia) Marin Čilić def. (Spain) Roberto Bautista Agut, 6–4, 6–4

=== Women's singles ===
- (Russia) Svetlana Kuznetsova def. (Russia) Anastasia Pavlyuchenkova 6–2, 6–1

=== Men's doubles ===
- (Russia) Andrey Rublev / (Russia) Dmitry Tursunov def. (Moldova) Radu Albot / (Czech Republic) František Čermák, 2–6, 6–1, [10–6]

=== Women's doubles ===
- (Russia) Daria Kasatkina / (Russia) Elena Vesnina def. (Romania) Irina-Camelia Begu / (Romania) Monica Niculescu 6–3, 6–7^{(7–9)}, [10–5]
