= 2017 Kremlin Cup – Women's singles =

Women's singles
- 2017 Kremlin Cup

Final
- Champion: (Germany) Julia Görges
- Runner-up: (Russia) Daria Kasatkina
- Score: 6–1, 6–2

Details
- Seeds: 8

Events
Singles	men	women
Doubles	men	women
- Kremlin Cup

Svetlana Kuznetsova was the two-time defending champion, but withdrew before the tournament began.

Julia Görges won her first title since 2011, defeating Daria Kasatkina in the final 6–1, 6–2.

== Seeds ==
The top four seeds received a bye into the second round.

1. (France) Kristina Mladenovic (second round)
2. (United States) CoCo Vandeweghe (second round)
3. (Russia) Elena Vesnina (second round)
4. (Latvia) Anastasija Sevastova (second round)
5. (Russia) Anastasia Pavlyuchenkova (first round)
6. (Australia) Daria Gavrilova (second round, retired)
7. (Germany) Julia Görges (champion)
8. (Slovakia) Magdaléna Rybáriková (second round, retired)

== Draw ==
Key

- Q = Qualifier
- WC = Wild card
- LL = Lucky loser
- Alt = Alternate
- ITF = ITF entry
- PR = Protected ranking
- SR = Special ranking
- SE = Special exempt
- JE = Junior exempt
- JR = Junior Accelerator Programme entrant
- CO = College Accelerator Programme entrant
- NG = Next Gen Accelerator Program entrant
- w/o = Walkover
- r = Retired
- d = Defaulted

=== Finals ===
Semifinals
(Russia) Daria Kasatkina	6	6
(Romania) Irina-Camelia Begu	2	3
(Russia) Natalia Vikhlyantseva	2	6	5
7	(Germany) Julia Görges	6	2	7

Final
(Russia) Daria Kasatkina	1	2
7	(Germany) Julia Görges	6	6

=== Top half ===
First round
(Belarus) A Sasnovich	1	7^{7}	6
(Hungary) T Babos	6	6^{3}	4
(Croatia) D Vekić	0	2
(Czech Republic) K Siniaková	6	6
(Russia) D Kasatkina	7^{7}	6
5	(Russia) A Pavlyuchenkova	6^{2}	1
Q	(Russia) E Rybakina	1	6	3
(Romania) I-C Begu	6	3	6
Q	(Belarus) V Lapko	6	6
(Belgium) M Zanevska	2	3
(Czech Republic) Kr Plíšková	4	7^{7}	1
6	(Australia) D Gavrilova	6	6^{5}	6

Second round
1	(France) K Mladenovic	2	6	2
(Belarus) A Sasnovich	6	2	6
(Czech Republic) K Siniaková	2	3
(Russia) D Kasatkina	6	6
4	(Latvia) A Sevastova	4	3
(Romania) I-C Begu	6	6
Q	(Belarus) V Lapko	6	3
6	(Australia) D Gavrilova	3	1^{r}

Quarterfinals
(Belarus) A Sasnovich	4	3
(Russia) D Kasatkina	6	6
(Romania) I-C Begu	6	4	7
Q	(Belarus) V Lapko	3	6	5

Semifinals
(Russia) D Kasatkina	6	6
(Romania) I-C Begu	2	3

=== Bottom half ===
First round
8	(Slovakia) M Rybáriková	7^{7}	6
WC	(Russia) M Sharapova	6^{3}	4
(Russia) E Makarova	3	3
(France) A Cornet	6	6
(Russia) N Vikhlyantseva	6	6
Q	(Estonia) K Kanepi	3	2
7	(Germany) J Görges	6	6
Q	(Russia) P Monova	0	3
WC	(Russia) O Pervushina	5	1
(Kazakhstan) Y Putintseva	7	6
(Ukraine) L Tsurenko	7^{7}	6
(United States) C McHale	6^{4}	3

Second round
8	(Slovakia) M Rybáriková	1	0^{r}
(France) A Cornet	6	0
(Russia) N Vikhlyantseva	7^{7}	6
3	(Russia) E Vesnina	6^{3}	4
7	(Germany) J Görges	6	6
(Kazakhstan) Y Putintseva	3	3
(Ukraine) L Tsurenko	7	1	6
2	(United States) C Vandeweghe	5	6	2

Quarterfinals
(France) A Cornet	6	5	3
(Russia) N Vikhlyantseva	4	7	6
7	(Germany) J Görges	6	6
(Ukraine) L Tsurenko	3	4

Semifinals
(Russia) N Vikhlyantseva	2	6	5
7	(Germany) J Görges	6	2	7

== Qualifying ==
=== Seeds ===
1. (Estonia) Kaia Kanepi (qualified)
2. (Australia) Arina Rodionova (qualifying competition)
3. (Belgium) Maryna Zanevska (moved to main draw)
4. (Czech Republic) Barbora Krejčíková (first round)
5. (Russia) Anna Blinkova (second round)
6. (United States) Bernarda Pera (second round)
7. (Czech Republic) Tereza Martincová (second round)
8. (Bulgaria) Viktoriya Tomova (second round)
9. (Ukraine) Anhelina Kalinina (second round)

=== Qualifiers ===
1. (Estonia) Kaia Kanepi
2. (Belarus) Vera Lapko
3. (Russia) Elena Rybakina
4. (Russia) Polina Monova

=== Draw ===
==== First qualifier ====
First round
1	(Estonia) Kaia Kanepi	6	6
(Ukraine) Olga Ianchuk	2	1
(Turkey) Başak Eraydın	6	3	3
(Serbia) Ivana Jorović	3	6	6
WC	(Russia) Alisa Kleybanova	6	6
(Russia) Vitalia Diatchenko	2	3
(Russia) Polina Leykina	6	2	5
6	(United States) Bernarda Pera	4	6	7

Second round
1	(Estonia) Kaia Kanepi	6	6
(Serbia) Ivana Jorović	2	0
WC	(Russia) Alisa Kleybanova	6	6
6	(United States) Bernarda Pera	4	2

Qualifying competition
1	(Estonia) Kaia Kanepi	6	2	7^{7}
WC	(Russia) Alisa Kleybanova	2	6	6^{3}

==== Second qualifier ====
First round
2	(Australia) Arina Rodionova	6	6
(Russia) Anastasia Potapova	3	1
(Ukraine) Dayana Yastremska	6	2	4
Alt	(Ukraine) Olga Savchuk	3	6	6
(Belarus) Vera Lapko	6	6
(Russia) Anastasia Frolova	0	0
(Uzbekistan) Sabina Sharipova	2	3
8	(Bulgaria) Viktoriya Tomova	6	6

Second round
2	(Australia) Arina Rodionova	6	6
Alt	(Ukraine) Olga Savchuk	2	4
(Belarus) Vera Lapko	6	6
8	(Bulgaria) Viktoriya Tomova	1	2

Qualifying competition
2	(Australia) Arina Rodionova	4	3
(Belarus) Vera Lapko	6	6

==== Third qualifier ====
First round
9	(Ukraine) Anhelina Kalinina	6	6
WC	(Russia) Sofya Lansere	1	4
(Russia) Ksenia Lykina	6	5	1
(Russia) Alla Kudryavtseva	3	7	6
WC	(Russia) Elena Rybakina	6	6
(Czech Republic) Petra Krejsová	1	4
(Slovakia) Chantal Škamlová	1	3
7	(Czech Republic) Tereza Martincová	6	6

Second round
9	(Ukraine) Anhelina Kalinina	6	2	4
(Russia) Alla Kudryavtseva	3	6	6
WC	(Russia) Elena Rybakina	4	7^{7}	6
7	(Czech Republic) Tereza Martincová	6	6^{4}	4

Qualifying competition
(Russia) Alla Kudryavtseva	2	3
WC	(Russia) Elena Rybakina	6	6

==== Fourth qualifier ====
First round
4	(Czech Republic) Barbora Krejčíková	7	4	3
(Russia) Polina Monova	5	6	6
WC	(Russia) Margarita Gasparyan	6	5	5
(Greece) Valentini Grammatikopoulou	4	7	7
(Russia) Viktoria Kamenskaya	6	6
(Russia) Anna Morgina	3	2
(Romania) Irina Bara	3	2
5	(Russia) Anna Blinkova	6	6

Second round
(Russia) Polina Monova	7^{7}	6
(Greece) Valentini Grammatikopoulou	6^{0}	4
(Russia) Viktoria Kamenskaya	6	6
5	(Russia) Anna Blinkova	1	4

Qualifying competition
(Russia) Polina Monova	6	6
(Russia) Viktoria Kamenskaya	4	4
