= 2015 Kremlin Cup – Men's singles =

Men's singles
- 2015 Kremlin Cup

Final
- Champion: (Croatia) Marin Čilić
- Runner-up: (Spain) Roberto Bautista Agut
- Score: 6–4, 6–4

Details
- Draw: 28 (4 Q / 3 WC )
- Seeds: 8

Events
Singles	men	women
Doubles	men	women
← 2014 ·	Kremlin Cup	· 2016 →

Defending champion Marin Čilić defeated Roberto Bautista Agut in the final, 6–4, 6–4 to win the men's singles tennis title at the 2015 Kremlin Cup.

== Seeds ==
The top four seeds received a bye into the second round.

1. (Croatia) Marin Čilić (champion)
2. (Spain) Roberto Bautista Agut (final)
3. (Serbia) Viktor Troicki (second round)
4. (Germany) Philipp Kohlschreiber (semifinals)
5. (Uruguay) Pablo Cuevas (second round)
6. (Croatia) Borna Ćorić (first round)
7. (Portugal) João Sousa (first round)
8. (Kazakhstan) Mikhail Kukushkin (second round)

== Draw ==
=== Key ===
- Q = Qualifier
- WC = Wild card
- LL = Lucky loser
- Alt = Alternate
- SE = Special exempt
- PR = Protected ranking
- ITF = ITF entry
- JE = Junior exempt
- w/o = Walkover
- r = Retired
- d = Defaulted
- SR = Special ranking

=== Finals ===
Semifinals
1	(Croatia) Marin Čilić	6	6
WC	(Russia) Evgeny Donskoy	3	1
4	(Germany) Philipp Kohlschreiber	4	4
2	(Spain) Roberto Bautista Agut	6	6

Final
1	(Croatia) Marin Čilić	6	6
2	(Spain) Roberto Bautista Agut	4	4

=== Top half ===
First round
(United Kingdom) A Bedene	3	3
(Uzbekistan) D Istomin	6	6
(Moldova) R Albot	4	2
(Russia) A Kuznetsov	6	6
WC	(Russia) A Rublev	2	4
8	(Kazakhstan) M Kukushkin	6	6
(Russia) T Gabashvili	6	6
WC	(Turkey) C İlkel	2	1
(Tunisia) M Jaziri	4	4
(Lithuania) R Berankis	6	6
WC	(Russia) E Donskoy	6	6
6	(Croatia) B Ćorić	4	4

Second round
1	(Croatia) M Čilić	7^{7}	3	6
(Uzbekistan) D Istomin	6^{3}	6	3
(Russia) A Kuznetsov	6	7
8	(Kazakhstan) M Kukushkin	1	5
3	(Serbia) V Troicki	2	3
(Russia) T Gabashvili	6	6
(Lithuania) R Berankis	4	5
WC	(Russia) E Donskoy	6	7

Quarterfinals
1	(Croatia) M Čilić	6	6
(Russia) A Kuznetsov	2	1
(Russia) T Gabashvili	3	2
WC	(Russia) E Donskoy	6	6

Semifinals
1	(Croatia) M Čilić	6	6
WC	(Russia) E Donskoy	3	1

=== Bottom half ===
First round
5	(Uruguay) P Cuevas	6	0
Q	(Spain) P Riba	1	0^{r}
Q	(Serbia) D Lajović	4	5
(Netherlands) R Haase	6	7
(Russia) M Youzhny	4	4
Q	(Russia) A Karatsev	6	6
7	(Portugal) J Sousa	6^{2}	6	5
(Spain) D Gimeno Traver	7^{7}	4	7
(Italy) S Bolelli	5	1^{r}
(France) L Pouille	7	4
(Turkey) M İlhan	6	6
Q	(Japan) T Ito	3	4

Second round
5	(Uruguay) P Cuevas	2	7	1
(Netherlands) R Haase	6	5	6
Q	(Russia) A Karatsev	6^{3}	6	4
4	(Germany) P Kohlschreiber	7^{7}	2	6
(Spain) D Gimeno Traver	1	6^{5}
(France) L Pouille	6	7^{7}
(Turkey) M İlhan	2	5
2	(Spain) R Bautista Agut	6	7

Quarterfinals
(Netherlands) R Haase	2	4
4	(Germany) P Kohlschreiber	6	6
(France) L Pouille	4	2
2	(Spain) R Bautista Agut	6	6

Semifinals
4	(Germany) P Kohlschreiber	4	4
2	(Spain) R Bautista Agut	6	6

== Qualifying ==
=== Seeds ===
1. (Serbia) Dušan Lajović (qualified)
2. (Japan) Tatsuma Ito (qualified)
3. (Russia) Konstantin Kravchuk (qualifying competition)
4. (Russia) Aslan Karatsev (qualified)
5. (Germany) Tobias Kamke (qualifying competition)
6. (Spain) Pere Riba (qualified)
7. (Bosnia and Herzegovina) Aldin Šetkić (second round)
8. (Serbia) Peđa Krstin (second round)

=== Qualifiers ===
1. (Serbia) Dušan Lajović
2. (Japan) Tatsuma Ito
3. (Spain) Pere Riba
4. (Russia) Aslan Karatsev

=== Qualifying draw ===
==== First qualifier ====
First round
1	(Serbia) Dušan Lajović	6	6
(Russia) Alexander Perfilov	3	0
WC	(Russia) Dmitry Tursunov	7	6^{4}	7^{9}
(Russia) Daniil Medvedev	5	7^{7}	6^{7}
(Russia) Philipp Davydenko	6	6
(Russia) Valery Rudnev	3	2
(Russia) Alexandr Igoshin	0	2
5	(Germany) Tobias Kamke	6	6

Second round
1	(Serbia) Dušan Lajović	6	6
WC	(Russia) Dmitry Tursunov	3	4
(Russia) Philipp Davydenko	1	0
5	(Germany) Tobias Kamke	6	6

Qualifying competition
1	(Serbia) Dušan Lajović	7	6
5	(Germany) Tobias Kamke	5	3

==== Second qualifier ====
First round
2	(Japan) Tatsuma Ito	6	3
(Estonia) Vladimir Ivanov	1	1^{r}
(Italy) Stefano Napolitano	6^{5}	7	4
(Russia) Richard Muzaev	7^{7}	5	6
(Russia) Alexander Vasilenko	6	7^{7}
(Canada) Pavel Krainik	4	6^{4}
(Russia) Dmitry Surchenko	0	2
8	(Serbia) Peđa Krstin	6	6

Second round
2	(Japan) Tatsuma Ito	1	6	6
(Russia) Richard Muzaev	6	2	1
(Russia) Alexander Vasilenko	6	6
8	(Serbia) Peđa Krstin	3	2

Qualifying competition
2	(Japan) Tatsuma Ito	6	7^{7}
(Russia) Alexander Vasilenko	1	6^{4}

==== Third qualifier ====
First round
3	(Russia) Konstantin Kravchuk	6	6
WC	(Russia) Ivan Denisov	1	1
(Russia) Evgeny Karlovskiy	4	6	4
(Romania) Petru-Alexandru Luncanu	6	4	6
PR	(Russia) Alexander Lobkov	2	2
(Russia) Alexey Vatutin	6	6
(Russia) Mikhail Ledovskikh	3	2
6	(Spain) Pere Riba	6	6

Second round
3	(Russia) Konstantin Kravchuk	6	6
(Romania) Petru-Alexandru Luncanu	2	2
(Russia) Alexey Vatutin	2	2
6	(Spain) Pere Riba	6	6

Qualifying competition
3	(Russia) Konstantin Kravchuk	3	4
6	(Spain) Pere Riba	6	6

==== Fourth qualifier ====
First round
4	(Russia) Aslan Karatsev	6	6
WC	(Russia) Vladimir Polyakov	3	1
WC	(Russia) Ilya Vasilyev	2	5
(Russia) Fedor Chervyakov	6	7
(Belarus) Sergey Betov	2	2
(Russia) Mikhail Elgin	6	6
(Russia) Anton Zaitcev	4	3
7	(Bosnia and Herzegovina) Aldin Šetkić	6	6

Second round
4	(Russia) Aslan Karatsev	7	6
(Russia) Fedor Chervyakov	5	2
(Russia) Mikhail Elgin	7^{7}	6
7	(Bosnia and Herzegovina) Aldin Šetkić	6^{3}	3

Qualifying competition
4	(Russia) Aslan Karatsev	6	6
(Russia) Mikhail Elgin	4	3
