= 2016 Kremlin Cup – Men's singles =

Men's singles
- 2016 Kremlin Cup

Final
- Champion: (Spain) Pablo Carreño Busta
- Runner-up: (Italy) Fabio Fognini
- Score: 4–6, 6–3, 6–2

Details
- Draw: 28 (4 Q / 3 WC )
- Seeds: 8

Events
Singles	men	women
Doubles	men	women
← 2015 ·	Kremlin Cup	· 2017 →

Marin Čilić was the two-time defending champion, but chose not to participate this year.

Pablo Carreño Busta won the title, defeating Fabio Fognini in the final, 4–6, 6–3, 6–2.

== Seeds ==
The top four seeds receive a bye into the second round.

1. (Spain) Roberto Bautista Agut (second round)
2. (Spain) Albert Ramos Viñolas (quarterfinals)
3. (Germany) Philipp Kohlschreiber (semifinals)
4. (Serbia) Viktor Troicki (second round)
5. (Slovakia) Martin Kližan (withdrew due to illness)
6. (Spain) Pablo Carreño Busta (champion)
7. (Italy) Paolo Lorenzi (second round)
8. (Russia) Andrey Kuznetsov (second round)
9. (Spain) Marcel Granollers (first round, retired)

== Draw ==
=== Key ===
- Q = Qualifier
- WC = Wild card
- LL = Lucky loser
- Alt = Alternate
- SE = Special exempt
- PR = Protected ranking
- ITF = ITF entry
- JE = Junior exempt
- w/o = Walkover
- r = Retired
- d = Defaulted
- SR = Special ranking

=== Finals ===
Semifinals
6	(Spain) Pablo Carreño Busta	6	7^{7}
(France) Stéphane Robert	3	6^{2}
3	(Germany) Philipp Kohlschreiber	1	6^{2}
(Italy) Fabio Fognini	6	7^{7}

Final
6	(Spain) Pablo Carreño Busta	4	6	6
(Italy) Fabio Fognini	6	3	2

=== Top half ===
First round
Q	(Russia) A Bublik	1	6	6
WC	(Russia) K Kravchuk	6	3	3
WC	(Russia) K Khachanov	6	6^{5}	4
(Bosnia and Herzegovina) D Džumhur	3	7^{7}	6
Q	(Austria) J Melzer	6	3	6^{2}
6	(Spain) P Carreño Busta	3	6	7^{7}
Q	(Russia) D Medvedev	6	4
(Kazakhstan) M Kukushkin	4	0^{r}
(Czech Republic) L Rosol	7	6
(Austria) G Melzer	5	2
(France) S Robert	5
9	(Spain) M Granollers	2^{r}

Second round
1	(Spain) R Bautista Agut	2	5
Q	(Russia) A Bublik	6	7
(Bosnia and Herzegovina) D Džumhur	3	1^{r}
6	(Spain) P Carreño Busta	6	2
4	(Serbia) V Troicki	6	3	1
Q	(Russia) D Medvedev	3	6	6
(Czech Republic) L Rosol	5	1
(France) S Robert	7	6

Quarterfinals
Q	(Russia) A Bublik	4	6	6^{1}
6	(Spain) P Carreño Busta	6	2	7^{7}
Q	(Russia) D Medvedev	5	6	4
(France) S Robert	7	0	6

Semifinals
6	(Spain) P Carreño Busta	6	7^{7}
(France) S Robert	3	6^{2}

=== Bottom half ===
First round
8	(Russia) A Kuznetsov	6	5	6
(Argentina) G Pella	3	7	2
WC	(Turkey) C İlkel	5	1
(Brazil) T Bellucci	7	6
(Serbia) D Lajović	7^{7}	6
PR	(Serbia) J Tipsarević	6^{4}	4
7	(Italy) P Lorenzi	6	6
LL	(Italy) F Gaio	4	4
(Lithuania) R Berankis	1	2
(Italy) F Fognini	6	6
Q	(Russia) A Karatsev	3	1^{r}
(Russia) E Donskoy	6	5

Second round
8	(Russia) A Kuznetsov	3	6	3
(Brazil) T Bellucci	6	3	6
(Serbia) D Lajović	5	6	3
3	(Germany) P Kohlschreiber	7	3	6
7	(Italy) P Lorenzi	5	6	1
(Italy) F Fognini	7	4	6
(Russia) E Donskoy	4	7^{7}	4
2	(Spain) A Ramos Viñolas	6	6^{4}	6

Quarterfinals
(Brazil) T Bellucci	4	2
3	(Germany) P Kohlschreiber	6	6
(Italy) F Fognini	6	6
2	(Spain) A Ramos Viñolas	2	2

Semifinals
3	(Germany) P Kohlschreiber	1	6^{2}
(Italy) F Fognini	6	7^{7}

== Qualifying ==
=== Seeds ===
1. (Russia) Teymuraz Gabashvili (first round)
2. (Russia) Daniil Medvedev (qualified)
3. (Czech Republic) Jan Šátral (first round)
4. (Russia) Andrey Rublev (first round)
5. (Belarus) Ilya Ivashka (first round, retired)
6. (Bosnia and Herzegovina) Mirza Bašić (qualifying competition)
7. (Italy) Federico Gaio (qualifying competition, lucky loser)
8. (Croatia) Franko Škugor (first round)

=== Qualifiers ===
1. (Austria) Jürgen Melzer
2. (Russia) Daniil Medvedev
3. (Russia) Aslan Karatsev
4. (Russia) Alexander Bublik

=== Lucky losers ===
1. (Italy) Federico Gaio

=== Qualifying draw ===
==== First qualifier ====
First round
1	(Russia) Teymuraz Gabashvili	0	3
PR	(Austria) Jürgen Melzer	6	6
(Belarus) Dzmitry Zhyrmont	6^{4}	3
7	(Italy) Federico Gaio	7^{7}	6

Qualifying competition
PR	(Austria) Jürgen Melzer	6	6
7	(Italy) Federico Gaio	1	4

==== Second qualifier ====
First round
2	(Russia) Daniil Medvedev	6	6
(Turkey) Marsel İlhan	1	4
(Croatia) Nikola Mektić	7^{7}	6^{5}	2
6	(Bosnia and Herzegovina) Mirza Bašić	6^{3}	7^{7}	6

Qualifying competition
2	(Russia) Daniil Medvedev	6	6
6	(Bosnia and Herzegovina) Mirza Bašić	2	0

==== Third qualifier ====
First round
3	(Czech Republic) Jan Šátral	6^{3}	6	4
WC	(Russia) Evgenii Tiurnev	7^{7}	4	6
(Russia) Aslan Karatsev	2
5	(Belarus) Ilya Ivashka	1^{r}

Qualifying competition
WC	(Russia) Evgenii Tiurnev	4	4
(Russia) Aslan Karatsev	6	6

==== Fourth qualifier ====
First round
4	(Russia) Andrey Rublev	4	6^{10}
WC	(Russia) Alexander Bublik	6	7^{12}
(Belarus) Egor Gerasimov	6	2	6
8	(Croatia) Franko Škugor	2	6	3

Qualifying competition
WC	(Russia) Alexander Bublik	7^{9}	4	6
(Belarus) Egor Gerasimov	6^{7}	6	2
