= 2017 Kremlin Cup – Women's doubles =

Women's doubles
- 2017 Kremlin Cup

Final
- Champions: (Hungary) Tímea Babos (Czech Republic) Andrea Hlaváčková
- Runners-up: (United States) Nicole Melichar (United Kingdom) Anna Smith
- Score: 6–2, 3–6, [10–3]

Details
- Seeds: 4

Events
Singles	men	women
Doubles	men	women
← 2016 ·	Kremlin Cup	· 2018 →

Andrea Hlaváčková and Lucie Hradecká were the defending champions, but Hradecká could not participate this year due to injury. Hlaváčková played alongside Tímea Babos and successfully defended the title, defeating Nicole Melichar and Anna Smith in the final, 6–2, 3–6, [10–3].

== Seeds ==
1. (Hungary) Tímea Babos / (Czech Republic) Andrea Hlaváčková (champions)
2. (Ukraine) Olga Savchuk / (Slovenia) Katarina Srebotnik (quarterfinals)
3. (Czech Republic) Barbora Krejčíková / (Czech Republic) Kateřina Siniaková (semifinals)
4. (Romania) Irina-Camelia Begu / (Romania) Raluca Olaru (first round)

== Draw ==
=== Key ===
- Q = Qualifier
- WC = Wild card
- LL = Lucky loser
- Alt = Alternate
- SE = Special exempt
- PR = Protected ranking
- ITF = ITF entry
- JE = Junior exempt
- w/o = Walkover
- r = Retired
- d = Defaulted
- SR = Special ranking

=== Draw ===
First round
1	(Hungary) T Babos (Czech Republic) A Hlaváčková	6^{7}	7^{7}	[10]
(France) A Cornet (France) K Mladenovic	7^{9}	6^{5}	[8]
(Belarus) V Lapko (Russia) A Potapova	6	6
(Russia) A Kudryavtseva (Poland) A Rosolska	2	4
3	(Czech Republic) B Krejčíková (Czech Republic) K Siniaková	6	6
(Kazakhstan) Y Putintseva (Belgium) M Zanevska	1	0
(Australia) M Adamczak (Czech Republic) R Voráčová	1	6	[10]
(United States) B Pera (United States) C Vandeweghe	6	1	[5]
(Russia) K Lykina (Russia) P Monova	6	7^{7}
WC	(Russia) A Blinkova (Russia) E Rybakina	2	6^{5}
(United States) N Melichar (United Kingdom) A Smith	3	6	[10]
4	(Romania) I-C Begu (Romania) R Olaru	6	4	[6]
(Ukraine) N Kichenok (Australia) An Rodionova	6	6
(Romania) I Bara (Slovakia) C Škamlová	4	4
(Ukraine) L Kichenok (Australia) Ar Rodionova	2	6	[7]
2	(Ukraine) O Savchuk (Slovenia) K Srebotnik	6	3	[10]

Quarterfinals
1	(Hungary) T Babos (Czech Republic) A Hlaváčková	7	6
(Belarus) V Lapko (Russia) A Potapova	5	2
3	(Czech Republic) B Krejčíková (Czech Republic) K Siniaková	6	6
(Australia) M Adamczak (Czech Republic) R Voráčová	4	4
(Russia) K Lykina (Russia) P Monova	4	1
(United States) N Melichar (United Kingdom) A Smith	6	6
(Ukraine) N Kichenok (Australia) An Rodionova	6	2	[12]
2	(Ukraine) O Savchuk (Slovenia) K Srebotnik	3	6	[10]

Semifinals
1	(Hungary) T Babos (Czech Republic) A Hlaváčková	4	6	[10]
3	(Czech Republic) B Krejčíková (Czech Republic) K Siniaková	6	1	[8]
(United States) N Melichar (United Kingdom) A Smith	6	6
(Ukraine) N Kichenok (Australia) An Rodionova	4	1

Final
1	(Hungary) T Babos (Czech Republic) A Hlaváčková	6	3	[10]
(United States) N Melichar (United Kingdom) A Smith	2	6	[3]
