= 2017 Kremlin Cup – Men's doubles =

Men's doubles
- 2017 Kremlin Cup

Final
- Champions: (Belarus) Max Mirnyi (Austria) Philipp Oswald
- Runners-up: (Bosnia and Herzegovina) Damir Džumhur (Croatia) Antonio Šančić
- Score: 6–3, 7–5

Details
- Draw: 16
- Seeds: 4

Events
| Singles | men | women |
| Doubles | men | women |
- Kremlin Cup

Juan Sebastián Cabal and Robert Farah were the defending champions but Farah chose not to participate this year. Cabal played alongside Denys Molchanov, but lost in the semifinals to Max Mirnyi and Philipp Oswald.

Mirnyi and Oswald went on to win the title, defeating Damir Džumhur and Antonio Šančić in the final, 6–3, 7–5.

== Seeds ==
1. (Belarus) Max Mirnyi / (Austria) Philipp Oswald (champions)
2. (Chile) Hans Podlipnik-Castillo / (Belarus) Andrei Vasilevski (quarterfinals)
3. (Colombia) Juan Sebastián Cabal / (Ukraine) Denys Molchanov (semifinals)
4. (United States) James Cerretani / (Australia) Marc Polmans (first round)

== Draw ==
Key

- Q = Qualifier
- WC = Wild card
- LL = Lucky loser
- Alt = Alternate
- ITF = ITF entry
- PR = Protected ranking
- SR = Special ranking
- SE = Special exempt
- JE = Junior exempt
- JR = Junior Accelerator Programme entrant
- CO = College Accelerator Programme entrant
- NG = Next Gen Accelerator Program entrant
- w/o = Walkover
- r = Retired
- d = Defaulted

=== Draw ===
First round
1 | (Belarus) M Mirnyi (Austria) P Oswald | 6 | 6
(Serbia) F Krajinović (Serbia) D Lajović | 1 | 2
(Italy) T Fabbiano (Israel) D Sela | 1 | 6^{5}
(Czech Republic) J Veselý (Slovakia) I Zelenay | 6 | 7^{7}
3 | (Colombia) JS Cabal (Ukraine) D Molchanov | 7^{7} | 6
WC | (Russia) A Karatsev (Russia) R Muzaev | 6^{4} | 1
(Russia) M Elgin (Russia) D Medvedev | 6 | 6
(Kazakhstan) A Bublik (Kazakhstan) M Kukushkin | 2 | 4
(Russia) E Donskoy (Russia) A Kuznetsov | 6 | 6
WC | (Russia) K Kravchuk (Russia) A Rublev | 4 | 3
(Brazil) R Dutra Silva (Italy) P Lorenzi | 6 | 6
4 | (United States) J Cerretani (Australia) M Polmans | 2 | 4
(Thailand) Sa Ratiwatana (Thailand) So Ratiwatana | 6^{5} | 6^{5}
(Bosnia and Herzegovina) D Džumhur (Croatia) A Šančić | 7^{7} | 7^{7}
PR | (Lithuania) R Berankis (Italy) A Seppi | 2 | 4
2 | (Chile) H Podlipnik-Castillo (Belarus) A Vasilevski | 6 | 6

Quarterfinals
1 | (Belarus) M Mirnyi (Austria) P Oswald | w/o
(Czech Republic) J Veselý (Slovakia) I Zelenay
3 | (Colombia) JS Cabal (Ukraine) D Molchanov | 6 | 6
(Russia) M Elgin (Russia) D Medvedev | 4 | 1
(Russia) E Donskoy (Russia) A Kuznetsov | 6 | 6
(Brazil) R Dutra Silva (Italy) P Lorenzi | 4 | 1
(Bosnia and Herzegovina) D Džumhur (Croatia) A Šančić | 6 | 7^{7}
2 | (Chile) H Podlipnik-Castillo (Belarus) A Vasilevski | 4 | 6^{4}

Semifinals
1 | (Belarus) M Mirnyi (Austria) P Oswald | 7^{7} | 6
3 | (Colombia) JS Cabal (Ukraine) D Molchanov | 6^{5} | 4
(Russia) E Donskoy (Russia) A Kuznetsov | 6^{6} | 4
(Bosnia and Herzegovina) D Džumhur (Croatia) A Šančić | 7^{8} | 6

Final
1 | (Belarus) M Mirnyi (Austria) P Oswald | 6 | 7
(Bosnia and Herzegovina) D Džumhur (Croatia) A Šančić | 3 | 5
