= 2015 Kremlin Cup – Women's doubles =

Women's doubles
- 2015 Kremlin Cup

Final
- Champions: (Russia) Daria Kasatkina (Russia) Elena Vesnina
- Runners-up: (Romania) Irina-Camelia Begu (Romania) Monica Niculescu
- Score: 6–3, 6–7^{(7–9)}, [10–5]

Details
- Seeds: 4

Events
Singles	men	women
Doubles	men	women
- Kremlin Cup

Martina Hingis and Flavia Pennetta were the defending champions, but chose not to participate this year.

Daria Kasatkina and Elena Vesnina won the title, beating Irina-Camelia Begu and Monica Niculescu 6–3, 6–7^{(7–9)}, [10–5] in the final.

== Seeds ==
1. (Germany) Anna-Lena Grönefeld / (Poland) Alicja Rosolska (first round)
2. (Romania) Irina-Camelia Begu / (Romania) Monica Niculescu (final)
3. (Slovenia) Andreja Klepač / (Czech Republic) Kateřina Siniaková (semifinals)
4. (Ukraine) Lyudmyla Kichenok / (Ukraine) Olga Savchuk (first round)

== Draw ==
Key

- Q = Qualifier
- WC = Wild card
- LL = Lucky loser
- Alt = Alternate
- ITF = ITF entry
- PR = Protected ranking
- SR = Special ranking
- SE = Special exempt
- JE = Junior exempt
- JR = Junior Accelerator Programme entrant
- CO = College Accelerator Programme entrant
- NG = Next Gen Accelerator Program entrant
- w/o = Walkover
- r = Retired
- d = Defaulted

First round
1	(Germany) A-L Grönefeld (Poland) A Rosolska	6^{3}	4
WC	(Russia) D Kasatkina (Russia) E Vesnina	7^{7}	6
(Latvia) J Ostapenko (Russia) E Rodina	6	6
(Ukraine) N Kichenok (Montenegro) D Kovinić	4	3
4	(Ukraine) L Kichenok (Ukraine) O Savchuk	6	1	[8]
(Croatia) D Jurak (United States) N Melichar	3	6	[10]
(Canada) G Dabrowski (Romania) R Olaru	6	6
WC	(Russia) A Bukhanko (Croatia) I Majoli	1	4
(Russia) M Gasparyan (Russia) A Panova	2	7^{8}	[7]
(Serbia) A Krunić (Croatia) P Martić	6	6^{6}	[10]
(Argentina) M Irigoyen (Poland) P Kania	2	6	[8]
3	(Slovenia) A Klepač (Czech Republic) K Siniaková	6	4	[10]
(Russia) V Solovyeva (Ukraine) M Zanevska	6	5	[5]
(Russia) V Dushevina (Australia) An Rodionova	4	7	[10]
(France) A Cornet (Russia) D Gavrilova	3	6^{2}
2	(Romania) I-C Begu (Romania) M Niculescu	6	7^{7}

Quarterfinals
WC	(Russia) D Kasatkina (Russia) E Vesnina	6	6
(Latvia) J Ostapenko (Russia) E Rodina	4	4
(Croatia) D Jurak (United States) N Melichar	7^{7}	6
(Canada) G Dabrowski (Romania) R Olaru	6^{5}	3
(Serbia) A Krunić (Croatia) P Martić	5	4
3	(Slovenia) A Klepač (Czech Republic) K Siniaková	7	6
(Russia) V Dushevina (Australia) An Rodionova	0	2
2	(Romania) I-C Begu (Romania) M Niculescu	6	6

Semifinals
WC	(Russia) D Kasatkina (Russia) E Vesnina	6	6
(Croatia) D Jurak (United States) N Melichar	3	4
3	(Slovenia) A Klepač (Czech Republic) K Siniaková	4	0
2	(Romania) I-C Begu (Romania) M Niculescu	6	6

Final
WC	(Russia) D Kasatkina (Russia) E Vesnina	6	6^{7}	[10]
2	(Romania) I-C Begu (Romania) M Niculescu	3	7^{9}	[5]
