= Kremlin Cup =

Tennis tournament

Coordinates: 55.781°N 37.626°E

Defunct tennis tournament
- Founded: 1990; 35 years ago
- Editions: 31 (2021); suspended since 2022
- Location: Moscow; Russia
- Venue: Olympic Stadium (1990–2018); Ice Palace Krylatskoye (2019); Irina Viner-Usmanova Gymnastics Palace and Luzhniki Palace of Sports (since 2021)
- Surface: Carpet – indoors (1990–2006); Hard (indoor) (since 2007)
- Website: kremlincup.ru

Current champions (2021)
- Men's singles: (Russia) Aslan Karatsev
- Women's singles: (Estonia) Anett Kontaveit
- Men's doubles: (Finland) Harri Heliövaara (Netherlands) Matwé Middelkoop
- Women's doubles: (Latvia) Jeļena Ostapenko (Czech Republic) Kateřina Siniaková
ATP Tour
- Category: ATP World Series / ATP International Series / ATP 250 series (1990–2021)
- Draw: 28S / 16Q / 16D
- Prize money: US$697,125 (2021)
WTA Tour
- Category: WTA Tier I (1997–2008); WTA Premier (2009–2021)
- Draw: 28S / 32Q / 16D
- Prize money: US$565,530 (2021)

The Kremlin Cup (Russian: Кубок Кремля, romanized: Kubok Kremlya) is a professional tennis tournament played on indoor hard courts, which has been suspended indefinitely since 2022. It was part of the ATP Tour 250 series of the ATP Tour and was a Premier Tournament on the WTA Tour. It was held annually at the Olympic Stadium in Moscow, Russia from 1990 to 2018. In 2019, the Olympic Stadium underwent a reconstruction lasting two years. The 2019 edition of the tournament was held at the Ice Palace Krylatskoye. In 2021, the Kremlin Cup was played at the Irina Viner-Usmanova Gymnastics Palace and the Luzhniki Palace of Sports.

Until 2007, it was held on a carpet surface. It was then held on RuKortHard surface until 2015. Since 2016 the tournament has been held on TPSurface.

In light of the 2022 Russian invasion of Ukraine, the Association of Tennis Professionals (ATP) and the Women's Tennis Association (WTA) suspended the tournament indefinitely.

== Past finals ==
=== Singles ===
==== Men ====
Year	Champions	Runners-up	Score
1990	(Soviet Union) Andrei Cherkasov	(United States) Tim Mayotte	6–2, 6–1
1991	(Soviet Union) Andrei Cherkasov (2)	(Switzerland) Jakob Hlasek	7–6^{(7–2)}, 3–6, 7–6^{(7–5)}
1992	(Switzerland) Marc Rosset	(Germany) Carl-Uwe Steeb	6–2, 6–2
1993	(Switzerland) Marc Rosset (2)	(Germany) Patrik Kühnen	6–4, 6–3
1994	(Russia) Alexander Volkov	(United States) Chuck Adams	6–2, 6–4
1995	(Germany) Carl-Uwe Steeb	(Czech Republic) Daniel Vacek	7–6^{(7–5)}, 3–6, 7–6^{(8–6)}
1996	(Croatia) Goran Ivanišević	(Russia) Yevgeny Kafelnikov	3–6, 6–1, 6–3
1997	(Russia) Yevgeny Kafelnikov	(Czech Republic) Petr Korda	7–6^{(7–2)}, 6–4
1998	(Russia) Yevgeny Kafelnikov (2)	(Croatia) Goran Ivanišević	7–6^{(7–2)}, 7–6^{(7–5)}
1999	(Russia) Yevgeny Kafelnikov (3)	(Zimbabwe) Byron Black	7–6^{(7–2)}, 6–4
2000	(Russia) Yevgeny Kafelnikov (4)	(Germany) David Prinosil	6–2, 7–5
2001	(Russia) Yevgeny Kafelnikov (5)	(Germany) Nicolas Kiefer	6–4, 7–5
2002	(France) Paul-Henri Mathieu	(Netherlands) Sjeng Schalken	4–6, 6–2, 6–0
2003	(United States) Taylor Dent	(Armenia) Sargis Sargsian	7–6^{(7–5)}, 6–4
2004	(Russia) Nikolay Davydenko	(United Kingdom) Greg Rusedski	3–6, 6–3, 7–5
2005	(Russia) Igor Andreev	(Germany) Nicolas Kiefer	5–7, 7–6^{(7–3)}, 6–2
2006	(Russia) Nikolay Davydenko (2)	(Russia) Marat Safin	6–4, 5–7, 6–4
2007	(Russia) Nikolay Davydenko (3)	(France) Paul-Henri Mathieu	7–5, 7–6^{(11–9)}
2008	(Russia) Igor Kunitsyn	(Russia) Marat Safin	7–6^{(8–6)}, 6–7^{(4–7)}, 6–3
2009	(Russia) Mikhail Youzhny	(Serbia) Janko Tipsarević	6–7^{(5–7)}, 6–0, 6–4
2010	(Serbia) Viktor Troicki	(Cyprus) Marcos Baghdatis	3–6, 6–4, 6–3
2011	(Serbia) Janko Tipsarević	(Serbia) Viktor Troicki	6–4, 6–2
2012	(Italy) Andreas Seppi	(Brazil) Thomaz Bellucci	3–6, 7–6^{(7–3)}, 6–3
2013	(France) Richard Gasquet	(Kazakhstan) Mikhail Kukushkin	4–6, 6–4, 6–4
2014	(Croatia) Marin Čilić	(Spain) Roberto Bautista Agut	6–4, 6–4
2015	(Croatia) Marin Čilić (2)	(Spain) Roberto Bautista Agut	6–4, 6–4
2016	(Spain) Pablo Carreño Busta	(Italy) Fabio Fognini	4–6, 6–3, 6–2
2017	(Bosnia and Herzegovina) Damir Džumhur	(Lithuania) Ričardas Berankis	6–2, 1–6, 6–4
2018	(Russia) Karen Khachanov	(France) Adrian Mannarino	6–2, 6–2
2019	(Russia) Andrey Rublev	(France) Adrian Mannarino	6–4, 6–0
2020	Not held due to COVID-19 pandemic		
2021	(Russia) Aslan Karatsev	(Croatia) Marin Čilić	6–2, 6–4
2022– 2025	Not held due to the Russian invasion of Ukraine		

==== Women ====
Year	Champion	Runner-up	Score
1996	(Spain) Conchita Martínez	(Austria) Barbara Paulus	6–1, 4–6, 6–4
↓ Tier I tournament ↓
1997	(Czech Republic) Jana Novotná	(Empire of Japan) Ai Sugiyama	6–3, 6–4
1998	(France) Mary Pierce	(United States) Monica Seles	7–6^{(7–2)}, 6–3
1999	(France) Nathalie Tauziat	(Austria) Barbara Schett	2–6, 6–4, 6–1
2000	(Switzerland) Martina Hingis	(Russia) Anna Kournikova	6–3, 6–1
2001	(Federal Republic of Yugoslavia) Jelena Dokić	(Russia) Elena Dementieva	6–3, 6–3
2002	(Bulgaria) Magdalena Maleeva	(United States) Lindsay Davenport	5–7, 6–3, 7–6^{(7–4)}
2003	(Russia) Anastasia Myskina	(France) Amélie Mauresmo	6–2, 6–4
2004	(Russia) Anastasia Myskina (2)	(Russia) Elena Dementieva	7–5, 6–0
2005	(France) Mary Pierce (2)	(Italy) Francesca Schiavone	6–4, 6–3
2006	(Russia) Anna Chakvetadze	(Russia) Nadia Petrova	6–4, 6–4
2007	(Russia) Elena Dementieva	(United States) Serena Williams	5–7, 6–1, 6–1
2008	(Serbia) Jelena Janković	(Russia) Vera Zvonareva	6–2, 6–4
↓ Premier tournament ↓
2009	(Italy) Francesca Schiavone	(Belarus) Olga Govortsova	6–3, 6–0
2010	(Belarus) Victoria Azarenka	(Russia) Maria Kirilenko	6–3, 6–4
2011	(Slovakia) Dominika Cibulková	(Estonia) Kaia Kanepi	3–6, 7–6^{(7–1)}, 7–5
2012	(Denmark) Caroline Wozniacki	(Australia) Samantha Stosur	6–2, 4–6, 7–5
2013	(Romania) Simona Halep	(Australia) Samantha Stosur	7–6^{(7–1)}, 6–2
2014	(Russia) Anastasia Pavlyuchenkova	(Romania) Irina-Camelia Begu	6–4, 5–7, 6–1
2015	(Russia) Svetlana Kuznetsova	(Russia) Anastasia Pavlyuchenkova	6–2, 6–1
2016	(Russia) Svetlana Kuznetsova (2)	(Australia) Daria Gavrilova	6–2, 6–1
2017	(Germany) Julia Görges	(Russia) Daria Kasatkina	6–1, 6–2
2018	(Russia) Daria Kasatkina	(Tunisia) Ons Jabeur	2–6, 7–6^{(7–3)}, 6–4
2019	(Switzerland) Belinda Bencic	(Russia) Anastasia Pavlyuchenkova	3–6, 6–1, 6–1
2020	Not held due to COVID-19 pandemic		
2021	(Estonia) Anett Kontaveit	(Russia) Ekaterina Alexandrova	4–6, 6–4, 7–5
2022– 2025	Not held due to the Russian invasion of Ukraine		

=== Doubles ===
==== Men ====
Year	Champions	Runners-up	Score
1990	(Netherlands) Hendrik Jan Davids (Netherlands) Paul Haarhuis	(Australia) John Fitzgerald (Sweden) Anders Järryd	6–4, 7–6
1991	(Germany) Eric Jelen (Germany) Carl-Uwe Steeb	(Soviet Union) Andrei Cherkasov (Soviet Union) Alexander Volkov	6–4, 7–6
1992	(South Africa) Marius Barnard (South Africa) John-Laffnie de Jager	(South Africa) David Adams (Russia) Andrei Olhovskiy	6–4, 3–6, 7–6
1993	(Netherlands) Jacco Eltingh (Netherlands) Paul Haarhuis (2)	(Sweden) Jan Apell (Sweden) Jonas Björkman	6–1, retired
1994	(Netherlands) Jacco Eltingh (2) (Netherlands) Paul Haarhuis (3)	(South Africa) David Adams (Russia) Andrei Olhovskiy	walkover
1995	(Zimbabwe) Byron Black (United States) Jared Palmer	(United States) Tommy Ho (New Zealand) Brett Steven	6–4, 3–6, 6–3
1996	(United States) Rick Leach (Russia) Andrei Olhovskiy	(Czech Republic) Jiří Novák (Czech Republic) David Rikl	4–6, 6–1, 6–2
1997	(Czech Republic) Martin Damm (Czech Republic) Cyril Suk	(South Africa) David Adams (France) Fabrice Santoro	6–4, 6–3
1998	(United States) Jared Palmer (2) (United States) Jeff Tarango	(Russia) Yevgeny Kafelnikov (Czech Republic) Daniel Vacek	6–4, 6–7, 6–2
1999	(United States) Justin Gimelstob (Czech Republic) Daniel Vacek	(Ukraine) Andrei Medvedev (Russia) Marat Safin	6–2, 6–1
2000	(Sweden) Jonas Björkman (Germany) David Prinosil	(Czech Republic) Jiří Novák (Czech Republic) David Rikl	6–2, 6–3
2001	(Belarus) Max Mirnyi (Australia) Sandon Stolle	(India) Mahesh Bhupathi (United States) Jeff Tarango	6–3, 6–0
2002	(Switzerland) Roger Federer (Belarus) Max Mirnyi (2)	(Australia) Joshua Eagle (Australia) Sandon Stolle	6–4, 7–6^{(7–0)}
2003	(India) Mahesh Bhupathi (Belarus) Max Mirnyi (3)	(Zimbabwe) Wayne Black (Zimbabwe) Kevin Ullyett	6–3, 7–5
2004	(Russia) Igor Andreev (Russia) Nikolay Davydenko	(India) Mahesh Bhupathi (Sweden) Jonas Björkman	3–6, 6–3, 6–4
2005	(Belarus) Max Mirnyi (4) (Russia) Mikhail Youzhny	(Russia) Igor Andreev (Russia) Nikolay Davydenko	6–1, 6–1
2006	(France) Fabrice Santoro (Serbia) Nenad Zimonjić	(Czech Republic) František Čermák (Czech Republic) Jaroslav Levinský	6–1, 7–5
2007	(Russia) Marat Safin (Russia) Dmitry Tursunov	(Czech Republic) Tomáš Cibulec (Croatia) Lovro Zovko	6–4, 6–2
2008	(Ukraine) Sergiy Stakhovsky (Italy) Potito Starace	(Australia) Stephen Huss (United Kingdom) Ross Hutchins	7–6^{(7–4)}, 2–6, [10–6]
2009	(Uruguay) Pablo Cuevas (Spain) Marcel Granollers	(Czech Republic) František Čermák (Slovakia) Michal Mertiňák	4–6, 7–5, [10–8]
2010	(Russia) Igor Kunitsyn (Russia) Dmitry Tursunov (2)	(Serbia) Janko Tipsarević (Serbia) Viktor Troicki	7–6^{(10–8)}, 6–3
2011	(Czech Republic) František Čermák (Slovakia) Filip Polášek	(Argentina) Carlos Berlocq (Spain) David Marrero	6–3, 6–1
2012	(Czech Republic) František Čermák (2) (Slovakia) Michal Mertiňák	(Italy) Simone Bolelli (Italy) Daniele Bracciali	7–5, 6–3
2013	(Russia) Mikhail Elgin (Uzbekistan) Denis Istomin	(United Kingdom) Ken Skupski (United Kingdom) Neal Skupski	6–2, 1–6, [14–12]
2014	(Czech Republic) František Čermák (3) (Czech Republic) Jiří Veselý	(Australia) Sam Groth (Australia) Chris Guccione	7–6^{(7–2)}, 7–5
2015	(Russia) Andrey Rublev (Russia) Dmitry Tursunov (3)	(Moldova) Radu Albot (Czech Republic) František Čermák	2–6, 6–1, [10–6]
2016	(Colombia) Juan Sebastián Cabal (Colombia) Robert Farah	(Austria) Julian Knowle (Austria) Jürgen Melzer	7–5, 4–6, [10–5]
2017	(Belarus) Max Mirnyi (5) (Austria) Philipp Oswald	(Bosnia and Herzegovina) Damir Džumhur (Croatia) Antonio Šančić	6–3, 7–5
2018	(United States) Austin Krajicek (United States) Rajeev Ram	(Belarus) Max Mirnyi (Austria) Philipp Oswald	7–6^{(7–4)}, 6–4
2019	(Brazil) Marcelo Demoliner (Netherlands) Matwé Middelkoop	(Italy) Simone Bolelli (Argentina) Andrés Molteni	6–1, 6–2
2020	Not held due to COVID-19 pandemic		
2021	(Finland) Harri Heliövaara (Netherlands) Matwé Middelkoop (2)	(Bosnia and Herzegovina) Tomislav Brkić (Serbia) Nikola Ćaćić	7–5, 4–6, [11–9]
2022– 2025	Not held due to the Russian invasion of Ukraine		

==== Women ====
Year	Champions	Runners-up	Score
1996	(Ukraine) Natalia Medvedeva (Latvia) Larisa Savchenko	(Italy) Silvia Farina Elia (Austria) Barbara Schett	7–6^{(7–5)}, 4–6, 6–1
↓ Tier I tournament ↓
1997	(Spain) Arantxa Sánchez (Belarus) Natalia Zvereva	(Indonesia) Yayuk Basuki (Netherlands) Caroline Vis	5–3 defaulted
1998	(France) Mary Pierce (Belarus) Natalia Zvereva (2)	(United States) Lisa Raymond (Australia) Rennae Stubbs	6–3, 6–4
1999	(United States) Lisa Raymond (Australia) Rennae Stubbs	(France) Julie Halard-Decugis (Germany) Anke Huber	6–1, 6–0
2000	(France) Julie Halard-Decugis (Japan) Ai Sugiyama	(Switzerland) Martina Hingis (Russia) Anna Kournikova	4–6, 6–4, 7–6^{(7–5)}
2001	(Switzerland) Martina Hingis (Russia) Anna Kournikova	(Russia) Elena Dementieva (Russia) Lina Krasnoroutskaya	7–6^{(7–1)}, 6–3
2002	(Russia) Elena Dementieva (Slovakia) Janette Husárová	(Serbia and Montenegro) Jelena Dokić (Russia) Nadia Petrova	2–6, 6–3, 7–6^{(9–7)}
2003	(Russia) Nadia Petrova (United States) Meghann Shaughnessy	(Russia) Anastasia Myskina (Russia) Vera Zvonareva	6–3, 6–4
2004	(Russia) Anastasia Myskina (Russia) Vera Zvonareva	(Spain) Virginia Ruano (Argentina) Paola Suárez	6–3, 4–6, 6–2
2005	(United States) Lisa Raymond (2) (Australia) Samantha Stosur	(Zimbabwe) Cara Black (Australia) Rennae Stubbs	6–2, 6–4
2006	(Czech Republic) Květa Peschke (Italy) Francesca Schiavone	(Czech Republic) Iveta Benešová (Russia) Galina Voskoboeva	6–4, 6–7^{(4–7)}, 6–1
2007	(Zimbabwe) Cara Black (United States) Liezel Huber	(Belarus) Victoria Azarenka (Belarus) Tatiana Poutchek	4–6, 6–1, [10–7]
2008	(Russia) Nadia Petrova (2) (Slovenia) Katarina Srebotnik	(Zimbabwe) Cara Black (United States) Liezel Huber	6–4, 6–4
↓ Premier tournament ↓
2009	(Russia) Maria Kirilenko (Russia) Nadia Petrova (3)	(Russia) Maria Kondratieva (Czech Republic) Klára Zakopalová	6–2, 6–2
2010	(Argentina) Gisela Dulko (Italy) Flavia Pennetta	(Italy) Sara Errani (Spain) María José Martínez Sánchez	6–3, 2–6, [10–6]
2011	(United States) Vania King (Kazakhstan) Yaroslava Shvedova	(Australia) Anastasia Rodionova (Kazakhstan) Galina Voskoboeva	7–6^{(7–3)}, 6–3
2012	(Russia) Ekaterina Makarova (Russia) Elena Vesnina	(Russia) Maria Kirilenko (Russia) Nadia Petrova	6–3, 1–6, [10–8]
2013	(Russia) Svetlana Kuznetsova (Australia) Samantha Stosur (2)	(Russia) Alla Kudryavtseva (Australia) Anastasia Rodionova	6–1, 1–6, [10–8]
2014	(Switzerland) Martina Hingis (2) (Italy) Flavia Pennetta (2)	(France) Caroline Garcia (Spain) Arantxa Parra Santonja	6–3, 7–5
2015	(Russia) Daria Kasatkina (Russia) Elena Vesnina (2)	(Romania) Irina-Camelia Begu (Romania) Monica Niculescu	6–3, 6–7^{(7–9)}, [10–5]
2016	(Czech Republic) Andrea Hlaváčková (Czech Republic) Lucie Hradecká	(Australia) Daria Gavrilova (Russia) Daria Kasatkina	4–6, 6–0, [10–7]
2017	(Hungary) Tímea Babos (Czech Republic) Andrea Hlaváčková (2)	(United States) Nicole Melichar (United Kingdom) Anna Smith	6–2, 3–6, [10–3]
2018	(Russia) Alexandra Panova (Germany) Laura Siegemund	(Croatia) Darija Jurak (Romania) Raluca Olaru	6–2, 7–6^{(7–2)}
2019	(Japan) Shuko Aoyama (Japan) Ena Shibahara	(Belgium) Kirsten Flipkens (United States) Bethanie Mattek-Sands	6–2, 6–1
2020	Not held due to COVID-19 pandemic		
2021	(Latvia) Jeļena Ostapenko (Czech Republic) Kateřina Siniaková	(Ukraine) Nadiia Kichenok (Romania) Raluca Olaru	6–2, 4–6, [10–8]
2022– 2025	Not held due to the Russian invasion of Ukraine		

Awards and achievements
Preceded by Dubai	Favorite WTA Tier I - II Tournament; 2003	Succeeded by Miami
