= 2011 Kremlin Cup – Women's singles qualifying =

This article displays the qualifying draw of the 2011 Kremlin Cup.

== Players ==
=== Seeds ===
1. (Kazakhstan) Galina Voskoboeva (qualified)
2. (Poland) Urszula Radwańska (second round)
3. (France) Stéphanie Foretz Gacon (first round)
4. (France) Alizé Cornet (qualified)
5. (Czech Republic) Eva Birnerová (second round)
6. (Australia) Anastasia Rodionova (second round)
7. (Spain) Arantxa Parra Santonja (qualifying competition, lucky loser)
8. (Russia) Anastasia Pivovarova (first round)

=== Qualifiers ===
1. (Kazakhstan) Galina Voskoboeva
2. (Ukraine) Olga Savchuk
3. (Russia) Ekaterina Ivanova
4. (France) Alizé Cornet

=== Lucky loser ===
1. (Spain) Arantxa Parra Santonja

== Qualifying draw ==
=== First qualifier ===
First round
1	(Kazakhstan) Galina Voskoboeva	6	6
(Spain) Nuria Llagostera Vives	0	1
(Romania) Mădălina Gojnea	6	6
WC	(Russia) Anastasia Frolova	2	2
(Belarus) Olga Govortsova	6	6
(Belarus) Polina Pekhova	1	4
(Ukraine) Mariya Koryttseva	3	5
5	(Czech Republic) Eva Birnerová	6	7

Second round
1	(Kazakhstan) Galina Voskoboeva	6	6
(Romania) Mădălina Gojnea	2	3
(Belarus) Olga Govortsova	2	6	6
5	(Czech Republic) Eva Birnerová	6	4	3

Qualifying competition
1	(Kazakhstan) Galina Voskoboeva	6	6
(Belarus) Olga Govortsova	3	4

=== Second qualifier ===
First round
2	(Poland) Urszula Radwańska	6	6
WC	(Russia) Marina Melnikova	0	4
(Russia) Marta Sirotkina	1	2
(Ukraine) Olga Savchuk	6	6
(Ukraine) Veronika Kapshay	2	1
(Germany) Scarlett Werner	6	6
WC	(Russia) Margarita Gasparyan	7^{7}	5	6^{4}
7	(Spain) Arantxa Parra Santonja	6^{3}	7	7^{7}

Second round
2	(Poland) Urszula Radwańska	3	4
(Ukraine) Olga Savchuk	6	6
(Germany) Scarlett Werner	6	1	0
7	(Spain) Arantxa Parra Santonja	2	6	6

Qualifying competition
(Ukraine) Olga Savchuk	6	6
7	(Spain) Arantxa Parra Santonja	2	2

=== Third qualifier ===
First round
3	(France) Stéphanie Foretz Gacon	5	3
(Ukraine) Lesia Tsurenko	7	6
(Russia) Yana Buchina	4	6	1
(Russia) Daria Gavrilova	6	4	6
(Georgia (country)) Sofia Shapatava	3	4
(Russia) Ekaterina Ivanova	6	6
(Turkey) Çağla Büyükakçay	7^{7}	1	1
6	(Australia) Anastasia Rodionova	6^{4}	6	6

Second round
(Ukraine) Lesia Tsurenko	7	6
(Russia) Daria Gavrilova	5	4
(Russia) Ekaterina Ivanova	6	3	6
6	(Australia) Anastasia Rodionova	3	6	3

Qualifying competition
(Ukraine) Lesia Tsurenko	0	6	2
(Russia) Ekaterina Ivanova	6	3	6

=== Fourth qualifier ===
First round
4	(France) Alizé Cornet	6	6
(Ukraine) Valentyna Ivakhnenko	2	4
WC	(Russia) Eugeniya Pashkova	6	0	0
(Slovakia) Lenka Wienerová	2	6	6
(Russia) Ekaterina Bychkova	6	6
(Russia) Valeria Solovieva	4	4
(Russia) Vitalia Diatchenko	6	6
8	(Russia) Anastasia Pivovarova	4	2

Second round
4	(France) Alizé Cornet	6	6
(Slovakia) Lenka Wienerová	1	2
(Russia) Ekaterina Bychkova	4	2
(Russia) Vitalia Diatchenko	6	6

Qualifying competition
4	(France) Alizé Cornet	6	2	6
(Russia) Vitalia Diatchenko	3	6	2
