= 2009 Kremlin Cup =

- Date: 17–25 October
- Edition: 20th (men) / 14th (women)
- Surface: Hard / indoor
- Location: Moscow, Russia
- Venue: Olympic Stadium

Champions

Men's singles
- (Russia) Mikhail Youzhny

Women's singles
- (Italy) Francesca Schiavone

Men's doubles
- (Uruguay) Pablo Cuevas / (Spain) Marcel Granollers

Women's doubles
- (Russia) Maria Kirilenko / (Russia) Nadia Petrova
← 2008 ·	Kremlin Cup	· 2010 →

The 2009 Kremlin Cup was a tennis tournament played on indoor hard courts. It was the 19th edition of the Kremlin Cup, and was part of the ATP World Tour 250 Series of the 2009 ATP World Tour, and of the Premier Series of the 2009 WTA Tour. It was held at the Olympic Stadium in Moscow, Russia, from 17 October through 25 October 2009.

== Finals ==
=== Men's singles ===
(Russia) Mikhail Youzhny defeated (Serbia) Janko Tipsarević, 6–7^{(5–7)}, 6–0, 6–4

- It was Youzhny's 1st title of the year, and the 5th of his career.

=== Women's singles ===
(Italy) Francesca Schiavone defeated (Belarus) Olga Govortsova, 6–3, 6–0

- It was Schiavone's 1st title of the year, and the 2nd of her career.

=== Men's doubles ===
(Uruguay) Pablo Cuevas / (Spain) Marcel Granollers defeated (Czech Republic) František Čermák / (Slovakia) Michal Mertiňák, 4–6, 7–5, [10–8]

- It was Cuevas's 2nd title of the year and the 3rd of his career. It was Granollers's 3rd title of the year and the 3rd of his career.

=== Women's doubles ===
(Russia) Maria Kirilenko / (Russia) Nadia Petrova defeated (Russia) Maria Kondratieva / (Czech Republic) Klára Zakopalová, 6–2, 6–2

- It was Kirilenko's 1st title of the year and the 6th of her career. It was Petrova's 3rd title of the year and the 18th of her career.

== ATP entrants ==
=== Seeds ===
Country	Player	Rank^{1}	Seed
RUS	Nikolay Davydenko	8	1
ROU	Victor Hănescu	27	2
RUS	Mikhail Youzhny	32	3
RUS	Igor Andreev	40	4
URU	Pablo Cuevas	45	5
SRB	Janko Tipsarević	46	6
FRA	Fabrice Santoro	49	7
ARG	Martín Vassallo Argüello	52	8

- seeds are based on the rankings of October 12, 2009

=== Other entrants ===
The following players received wildcards into the singles main draw:

- (Russia) Mikhail Biryukov
- (Russia) Evgeny Donskoy
- (Russia) Andrey Kuznetsov

The following players received entry from the qualifying draw:

- (Germany) Nicolas Kiefer
- (Kazakhstan) Mikhail Kukushkin
- (Ukraine) Illya Marchenko
- (Ukraine) Sergiy Stakhovsky

== WTA entrants ==
=== Seeds ===
Country	Player	Rank^{1}	Seed
RUS	Vera Zvonareva	7	1
SRB	Jelena Janković	9	2
POL	Agnieszka Radwańska	10	3
ITA	Flavia Pennetta	11	4
RUS	Nadia Petrova	17	5
RUS	Elena Vesnina	22	6
SVK	Dominika Cibulková	25	7
ITA	Francesca Schiavone	26	8

- seeds are based on the rankings of October 12, 2009

=== Other entrants ===
The following players received wildcards into the singles main draw:

- (Russia) Yana Buchina
- (Russia) Ksenia Pervak

The following players received entry from the qualifying draw:

- (Spain) Nuria Llagostera Vives
- (Bulgaria) Tsvetana Pironkova
- (Russia) Evgeniya Rodina
- (Kazakhstan) Galina Voskoboeva
