= 2010 Kremlin Cup =

- Date: 18–24 October
- Edition: 21st (men) / 15th (women)
- Category: ATP World Tour 250 Series (men); Premier Series (women)
- Surface: Hard / indoor
- Location: Moscow, Russia
- Venue: Olympic Stadium

Champions

Men's singles
- (Serbia) Viktor Troicki

Women's singles
- (Belarus) Victoria Azarenka

Men's doubles
- (Russia) Igor Kunitsyn / (Russia) Dmitry Tursunov

Women's doubles
- (Argentina) Gisela Dulko / (Italy) Flavia Pennetta
← 2009 ·	Kremlin Cup	· 2011 →

The 2010 Kremlin Cup was a tennis tournament played on indoor hard courts. It was the 21st edition of the Kremlin Cup for the men (15th edition for the women) and was part of the ATP World Tour 250 Series of the 2010 ATP World Tour, and of the Premier Series of the 2010 WTA Tour. It was held at the Olympic Stadium in Moscow, Russia, from 18 October through 24 October 2010. Viktor Troicki and Victoria Azarenka won the singles title.

== Finals ==
=== Men's singles ===
(Serbia) Viktor Troicki defeated (Cyprus) Marcos Baghdatis, 3–6, 6–4, 6–3

- It was Troicki's first career title.

=== Women's singles ===
(Belarus) Victoria Azarenka defeated (Russia) Maria Kirilenko, 6–3, 6–4

- It was Azarenka's second title of the year, and the fifth of her career.

=== Men's doubles ===
(Russia) Igor Kunitsyn / (Russia) Dmitry Tursunov defeated (Serbia) Janko Tipsarević / (Serbia) Viktor Troicki, 7–6^{(10–8)}, 6–3

=== Women's doubles ===
(Argentina) Gisela Dulko / (Italy) Flavia Pennetta defeated (Italy) Sara Errani / (Spain) María José Martínez Sánchez, 6–3, 2–6, [10–6]

== ATP entrants ==
=== Seeds ===
Country	Player	Rank^{1}	Seed
RUS	Nikolay Davydenko	6	1
RUS	Mikhail Youzhny	8	2
FRA	Jo-Wilfried Tsonga	13	3
CYP	Marcos Baghdatis	18	4
CZE	Radek Štěpánek	30	5
KAZ	Andrey Golubev	33	6
UKR	Sergiy Stakhovsky	34	7
SRB	Janko Tipsarević	37	8

- Seeds are based on the rankings of October 11, 2010

=== Other entrants ===
The following players received wildcards into the singles main draw:

- (Russia) Igor Andreev
- (Russia) Teymuraz Gabashvili
- (Russia) Dmitry Tursunov

The following players received entry from the qualifying draw:

- (Russia) Ilya Belyaev
- (Romania) Victor Crivoi
- (Russia) Igor Kunitsyn
- (Russia) Andrey Kuznetsov

The following player received entry as a Lucky loser into the singles main draw:

- (France) Paul-Henri Mathieu

== WTA entrants ==
=== Seeds ===
Country	Player	Rank^{1}	Seed
SRB	Jelena Janković	7	1
BLR	Victoria Azarenka	10	2
CHN	Li Na	11	3
RUS	Anastasia Pavlyuchenkova	21	4
ITA	Flavia Pennetta	23	5
RUS	Maria Kirilenko	24	6
RUS	Alisa Kleybanova	26	7
ESP	María José Martínez Sánchez	27	8

- Seeds are based on the rankings of October 11, 2010

=== Other entrants ===
The following players received wildcards into the singles main draw:

- (Russia) Daria Gavrilova
- (Russia) Alla Kudryavtseva
- (China) Li Na

The following players received entry from the qualifying draw:

- (Kazakhstan) Zarina Diyas
- (Ukraine) Mariya Koryttseva
- (Russia) Ksenia Pervak
- (Ukraine) Olga Savchuk
