= 2009 Kremlin Cup – Women's singles =

Women's singles
- 2009 Kremlin Cup

Final
- Champion: (Italy) Francesca Schiavone
- Runner-up: (Belarus) Olga Govortsova
- Score: 6–3, 6–0

Details
- Draw: 32
- Seeds: 8

Events
Singles	men	women
Doubles	men	women
- Kremlin Cup

Jelena Janković was the defending champion, but she lost in the quarterfinals to Alisa Kleybanova.

Francesca Schiavone won the title, defeating Olga Govortsova in the final 6–3, 6–0.

== Seeds ==
1. (Russia) Vera Zvonareva (second round)
2. (Serbia) Jelena Janković (quarterfinals)
3. (Poland) Agnieszka Radwańska (first round)
4. (Italy) Flavia Pennetta (first round, retired due to a left knee injury)
5. (Russia) Nadia Petrova (second round)
6. (Russia) Elena Vesnina (first round)
7. (Slovakia) Dominika Cibulková (first round)
8. (Italy) Francesca Schiavone (champion)

== Draw ==
Key

- Q = Qualifier
- WC = Wild card
- LL = Lucky loser
- Alt = Alternate
- ITF = ITF entry
- PR = Protected ranking
- SR = Special ranking
- SE = Special exempt
- JE = Junior exempt
- JR = Junior Accelerator Programme entrant
- CO = College Accelerator Programme entrant
- NG = Next Gen Accelerator Program entrant
- w/o = Walkover
- r = Retired
- d = Defaulted

=== Finals ===
Semifinals
(Ukraine) Alona Bondarenko	4	0
8	(Italy) Francesca Schiavone	6	6
(Belarus) Olga Govortsova	6	6
(Russia) Alisa Kleybanova	2	1

Final
8	(Italy) Francesca Schiavone	6	6
(Belarus) Olga Govortsova	3	0

=== Top half ===
First round
1	(Russia) V Zvonareva	6	6
(Romania) IR Olaru	2	2
(Russia) A Pavlyuchenkova	3	6	4
Q	(Bulgaria) T Pironkova	6	2	6
(Russia) A Chakvetadze	4	3
(Ukraine) A Bondarenko	6	6
WC	(Russia) Y Buchina	2	0
5	(Russia) N Petrova	6	6
3	(Poland) A Radwańska	3	3
(Russia) M Kirilenko	6	6
(Canada) A Wozniak	6	0
(Italy) S Errani	1	0^{r}
(Romania) M Niculescu	3
(Romania) S Cîrstea	0^{r}
Q	(Spain) N Llagostera Vives	7^{7}	4	3
8	(Italy) F Schiavone	6^{2}	6	6

Second round
1	(Russia) V Zvonareva	0	2
Q	(Bulgaria) T Pironkova	6	6
(Ukraine) A Bondarenko	7^{7}	6
5	(Russia) N Petrova	6^{3}	3
(Russia) M Kirilenko	6	6
(Canada) A Wozniak	4	3
(Romania) M Niculescu	2	5
8	(Italy) F Schiavone	6	7

Quarterfinals
Q	(Bulgaria) T Pironkova	3	3
(Ukraine) A Bondarenko	6	6
(Russia) M Kirilenko	3	2
8	(Italy) F Schiavone	6	6

Semifinals
(Ukraine) A Bondarenko	4	0
8	(Italy) F Schiavone	6	6

=== Bottom half ===
First round
7	(Slovakia) D Cibulková	2	2
(Spain) MJ Martínez Sánchez	6	6
(Belarus) O Govortsova	6	4	6
WC	(Russia) K Pervak	3	6	0
(Russia) V Dushevina	3	6	6
Q	(Kazakhstan) G Voskoboeva	6	2	1
(Hungary) Á Szávay	4	3
4	(Italy) F Pennetta	6	0^{r}
6	(Russia) E Vesnina	1	6	2
Q	(Russia) E Rodina	6	3	6
(Russia) A Kleybanova	6	6
(Slovakia) M Rybáriková	1	2
(Russia) E Makarova	2	2
(Czech Republic) L Šafářová	6	6
(Kazakhstan) Y Shvedova	4	7	1
2	(Serbia) J Janković	6	5	6

Second round
(Spain) MJ Martínez Sánchez	1	4
(Belarus) O Govortsova	6	6
(Russia) V Dushevina	3	6	6
(Hungary) Á Szávay	6	4	3
Q	(Russia) E Rodina	1	2
(Russia) A Kleybanova	6	6
(Czech Republic) L Šafářová	6^{5}	3
2	(Serbia) J Janković	7^{7}	6

Quarterfinals
(Belarus) O Govortsova	6	6
(Russia) V Dushevina	3	0
(Russia) A Kleybanova	6	6
2	(Serbia) J Janković	4	3

Semifinals
(Belarus) O Govortsova	6	6
(Russia) A Kleybanova	2	1
