= 2009 Kremlin Cup – Women's doubles =

Women's doubles
- 2009 Kremlin Cup

Final
- Champions: (Russia) Maria Kirilenko (Russia) Nadia Petrova
- Runners-up: (Russia) Maria Kondratieva (Czech Republic) Klára Zakopalová
- Score: 6–2, 6–2

Details
- Seeds: 4

Events
Singles	men	women
Doubles	men	women
← 2008 ·	Kremlin Cup	· 2010 →

Nadia Petrova and Katarina Srebotnik were the defending champions, but Srebotnik chose to participate at the BGL Luxembourg Open instead.
Petrova partnered up with Maria Kirilenko, and they won in the final 6–2, 6–2 against Maria Kondratieva and Klára Zakopalová.

== Seeds ==
1. (Spain) Nuria Llagostera Vives / (Spain) María José Martínez Sánchez (quarterfinals, withdrew)
2. (Russia) Alisa Kleybanova / (Russia) Ekaterina Makarova (quarterfinals)
3. (Russia) Maria Kirilenko / (Russia) Nadia Petrova (champions)
4. (Uzbekistan) Akgul Amanmuradova / (Romania) Monica Niculescu (semifinals)

== Draw ==
=== Key ===
- Q = Qualifier
- WC = Wild card
- LL = Lucky loser
- Alt = Alternate
- SE = Special exempt
- PR = Protected ranking
- ITF = ITF entry
- JE = Junior exempt
- w/o = Walkover
- r = Retired
- d = Defaulted
- SR = Special ranking

First round
1	(Spain) N Llagostera Vives (Spain) MJ Martínez Sánchez	1	6	[10]
(Belarus) O Govortsova (Russia) A Kudryavtseva	6	4	8
(Russia) M Kondratieva (Czech Republic) K Zakopalová	6	4	[11]
(Russia) V Diatchenko (Belarus) E Dzehalevich	4	6	[9]
4	(Uzbekistan) A Amanmuradova (Romania) M Niculescu	6	6
(Romania) IR Olaru (Kyrgyzstan) K Palkina	0	1
(United States) A Glatch (Russia) A Jidkova	1	0
(Ukraine) M Koryttseva (Belarus) T Poutchek	6	6
(Russia) Ar Rodionova (Ukraine) O Savchuk	6	3	[12]
(Czech Republic) L Šafářová (Hungary) Á Szávay	2	6	[10]
(Russia) V Dushevina (Russia) An Rodionova	1	4
3	(Russia) M Kirilenko (Russia) N Petrova	6	6
(Ukraine) A Bondarenko (Kazakhstan) G Voskoboeva	6	6
WC	(Russia) A Chakvetadze (Russia) A Pavlyuchenkova	3	2
(Turkey) İ Şenoğlu (Kazakhstan) Y Shvedova	4	4
2	(Russia) A Kleybanova (Russia) E Makarova	6	6

Quarterfinals
1	(Spain) N Llagostera Vives (Spain) MJ Martínez Sánchez
(Russia) M Kondratieva (Czech Republic) K Zakopalová	w/o
4	(Uzbekistan) A Amanmuradova (Romania) M Niculescu	6	7
(Ukraine) M Koryttseva (Belarus) T Poutchek	0	6^{4}
(Russia) Ar Rodionova (Ukraine) O Savchuk	6	5	[9]
3	(Russia) M Kirilenko (Russia) N Petrova	1	7	[11]
(Ukraine) A Bondarenko (Kazakhstan) G Voskoboeva	3	6	[10]
2	(Russia) A Kleybanova (Russia) E Makarova	6	2	[6]

Semifinals
(Russia) M Kondratieva (Czech Republic) K Zakopalová	3	6	[11]
4	(Uzbekistan) A Amanmuradova (Romania) M Niculescu	6	2	[9]
3	(Russia) M Kirilenko (Russia) N Petrova	6	6
(Ukraine) A Bondarenko (Kazakhstan) G Voskoboeva	0	0

Final
(Russia) M Kondratieva (Czech Republic) K Zakopalová	2	2
3	(Russia) M Kirilenko (Russia) N Petrova	6	6
