= 2011 Kremlin Cup – Women's doubles =

Women's doubles
- 2011 Kremlin Cup

Final
- Champions: (United States) Vania King (Kazakhstan) Yaroslava Shvedova
- Runners-up: (Australia) Anastasia Rodionova (Kazakhstan) Galina Voskoboeva
- Score: 7–6^{(7–3)}, 6–3

Details
- Seeds: 4

Events
Singles	men	women
Doubles	men	women
← 2010 ·	Kremlin Cup	· 2012 →

Gisela Dulko and Flavia Pennetta were the defending champions but decided not to participate.
Vania King and Yaroslava Shvedova won the title, defeating Anastasia Rodionova and Galina Voskoboeva in the finals.

== Seeds ==
1. (Czech Republic) Květa Peschke / (Slovenia) Katarina Srebotnik (quarterfinals)
2. (United States) Vania King / (Kazakhstan) Yaroslava Shvedova (champions)
3. (South Africa) Natalie Grandin / (Czech Republic) Vladimíra Uhlířová (semifinals)
4. (Australia) Anastasia Rodionova / (Kazakhstan) Galina Voskoboeva (final)

== Draw ==
=== Key ===
- Q = Qualifier
- WC = Wild card
- LL = Lucky loser
- Alt = Alternate
- SE = Special exempt
- PR = Protected ranking
- ITF = ITF entry
- JE = Junior exempt
- w/o = Walkover
- r = Retired
- d = Defaulted
- SR = Special ranking

=== Draw ===
First round
1	(Czech Republic) K Peschke (Slovenia) K Srebotnik	4	6	[10]
(Spain) N Llagostera Vives (Spain) A Parra Santonja	6	0	[4]
WC	(Russia) M Gasparyan (Russia) D Gavrilova	4	6	[5]
(Poland) U Radwańska (Russia) E Rodina	6	2	[10]
4	(Australia) A Rodionova (Kazakhstan) G Voskoboeva	6	6
(Ukraine) A Bondarenko (Ukraine) O Savchuk	0	4
(France) S Lefèvre (United States) M Moulton-Levy	0	4
(France) A Cornet (Poland) A Rosolska	6	6
(Slovenia) P Hercog (Russia) K Pervak	6	6
(Russia) V Dushevina (Ukraine) M Koryttseva	1	3
(Czech Republic) E Birnerová (Czech Republic) K Zakopalová	3	3
3	(South Africa) N Grandin (Czech Republic) V Uhlířová	6	6
(Belarus) O Govortsova (Russia) A Kudryavtseva	6	4	[5]
(Russia) V Diatchenko (Russia) E Vesnina	3	6	[10]
(Russia) M Kondratieva (Croatia) P Martić	2	2
2	(United States) V King (Kazakhstan) Y Shvedova	6	6

Quarterfinals
1	(Czech Republic) K Peschke (Slovenia) K Srebotnik	4	3
(Poland) U Radwańska (Russia) E Rodina	6	6
4	(Australia) A Rodionova (Kazakhstan) G Voskoboeva	5	6	[12]
(France) A Cornet (Poland) A Rosolska	7	3	[10]
(Slovenia) P Hercog (Russia) K Pervak	6	3	[11]
3	(South Africa) N Grandin (Czech Republic) V Uhlířová	4	6	[13]
(Russia) V Diatchenko (Russia) E Vesnina	6	4	r
2	(United States) V King (Kazakhstan) Y Shvedova	4	2

Semifinals
(Poland) U Radwańska (Russia) E Rodina	0	4
4	(Australia) A Rodionova (Kazakhstan) G Voskoboeva	6	6
3	(South Africa) N Grandin (Czech Republic) V Uhlířová	4	6	[8]
2	(United States) V King (Kazakhstan) Y Shvedova	6	2	[10]

Final
4	(Australia) A Rodionova (Kazakhstan) G Voskoboeva	6^{3}	3
2	(United States) V King (Kazakhstan) Y Shvedova	7^{7}	6
