= 2009 Kremlin Cup – Men's doubles =

Men's doubles
- 2009 Kremlin Cup

Final
- Champions: (Uruguay) Pablo Cuevas (Spain) Marcel Granollers
- Runners-up: (Czech Republic) František Čermák (Slovakia) Michal Mertiňák
- Score: 4–6, 7–5, [10–8]

Details
- Draw: 16
- Seeds: 4

Events
Singles	men	women
Doubles	men	women
← 2008 ·	Kremlin Cup	· 2010 →

Sergiy Stakhovsky and Potito Starace were the defending champions, but they chose not to participate this year.
Pablo Cuevas and Marcel Granollers won in the final 4–6, 7–5, [10–8] against František Čermák and Michal Mertiňák.

== Seeds ==
1. (Czech Republic) František Čermák / (Slovakia) Michal Mertiňák (final)
2. (United States) Eric Butorac / (United States) Rajeev Ram (semifinals)
3. (Uruguay) Pablo Cuevas / (Spain) Marcel Granollers (champions)
4. (United Kingdom) Ross Hutchins / (Romania) Horia Tecău (first round)

== Draw ==
=== Key ===
- Q = Qualifier
- WC = Wild card
- LL = Lucky loser
- Alt = Alternate
- SE = Special exempt
- PR = Protected ranking
- ITF = ITF entry
- JE = Junior exempt
- w/o = Walkover
- r = Retired
- d = Defaulted
- SR = Special ranking

First round
1	(Czech Republic) F Čermák (Slovakia) M Mertiňák	7^{8}	7
(France) F Santoro (Russia) M Youzhny	6^{6}	5
WC	(Russia) T Gabashvili (Russia) A Manegin	6	2	[3]
(Russia) I Andreev (Austria) D Köllerer	4	6	[10]
4	(United Kingdom) R Hutchins (Romania) H Tecău	6^{4}	6	[8]
(Kazakhstan) A Golubev (Russia) E Korolev	7^{7}	2	[10]
(United States) J Cerretani (Romania) V Hănescu	6^{6}	2
(India) R Bopanna (Serbia) J Tipsarević	7^{8}	6
(Slovakia) K Beck (Slovakia) F Polášek	1	6	[10]
(United States) S Lipsky (Netherlands) R Wassen	6	4	[6]
(Czech Republic) L Friedl (Czech Republic) J Levinský	3	6	[6]
3	(Uruguay) P Cuevas (Spain) M Granollers	6	3	[10]
WC	(Russia) I Belyaev (Russia) P Davydenko	1	3
(Argentina) M Vassallo Argüello (Argentina) H Zeballos	6	6
(Russia) I Kunitsyn (Russia) M Safin	2	4
2	(United States) E Butorac (United States) R Ram	6	6

Quarterfinals
1	(Czech Republic) F Čermák (Slovakia) M Mertiňák	6	6
(Russia) I Andreev (Austria) D Köllerer	0	3
(Kazakhstan) A Golubev (Russia) E Korolev	6^{1}	5
(India) R Bopanna (Serbia) J Tipsarević	7^{7}	7
(Slovakia) K Beck (Slovakia) F Polášek	4	2
3	(Uruguay) P Cuevas (Spain) M Granollers	6	6
(Argentina) M Vassallo Argüello (Argentina) H Zeballos	4	5
2	(United States) E Butorac (United States) R Ram	6	7

Semifinals
1	(Czech Republic) F Čermák (Slovakia) M Mertiňák	6^{5}	7^{7}	[10]
(India) R Bopanna (Serbia) J Tipsarević	7^{7}	6^{5}	[6]
3	(Uruguay) P Cuevas (Spain) M Granollers	6	6
2	(United States) E Butorac (United States) R Ram	4	3

Finals
1	(Czech Republic) F Čermák (Slovakia) M Mertiňák	6	5	[8]
3	(Uruguay) P Cuevas (Spain) M Granollers	4	7	[10]
