= 2010 Kremlin Cup – Women's singles =

Women's singles
- 2010 Kremlin Cup

Final
- Champion: (Belarus) Victoria Azarenka
- Runner-up: (Russia) Maria Kirilenko
- Score: 6–3, 6–4

Details
- Draw: 30
- Seeds: 8

Events
Singles	men	women
Doubles	men	women
- Kremlin Cup

Francesca Schiavone was the defending champion, but chose not to participate this year.

Victoria Azarenka won the title, defeating Maria Kirilenko in the final 6–3, 6–4.

== Seeds ==
The top two seeds receive a bye into the second round.

1. (Serbia) Jelena Janković (second round)
2. (Belarus) Victoria Azarenka (champion)
3. (China) Li Na (first round)
4. (Russia) Anastasia Pavlyuchenkova (first round)
5. (Italy) Flavia Pennetta (first round)
6. (Russia) Maria Kirilenko (final)
7. (Russia) Alisa Kleybanova (quarterfinals)
8. (Spain) María José Martínez Sánchez (semifinals)

== Main draw ==
Key

- Q = Qualifier
- WC = Wild card
- LL = Lucky loser
- Alt = Alternate
- ITF = ITF entry
- PR = Protected ranking
- SR = Special ranking
- SE = Special exempt
- JE = Junior exempt
- JR = Junior Accelerator Programme entrant
- CO = College Accelerator Programme entrant
- NG = Next Gen Accelerator Program entrant
- w/o = Walkover
- r = Retired
- d = Defaulted

=== Finals ===
Semifinals
6	(Russia) Maria Kirilenko	6	6
(Russia) Vera Dushevina	1	1
8	(Spain) María José Martínez Sánchez	3	3
2	(Belarus) Victoria Azarenka	6	6

Final
6	(Russia) Maria Kirilenko	3	4
2	(Belarus) Victoria Azarenka	6	6

=== Top half ===
First round
Q	(Kazakhstan) Z Diyas	6	6^{1}	7^{7}
(Argentina) G Dulko	3	7^{7}	6^{5}
(Ukraine) K Bondarenko	6	6^{7}	6
(Czech Republic) P Kvitová	3	7^{9}	1
(Romania) A Dulgheru	2	2
6	(Russia) M Kirilenko	6	6
3/WC	(China) N Li	4	2
(Russia) A Chakvetadze	6	6
(Czech Republic) K Zakopalová	6	3	5
Q	(Ukraine) M Koryttseva	3	6	7
(Russia) V Dushevina	7	6
(Russia) E Makarova	5	0
(Russia) E Vesnina	6	2	6
5	(Italy) F Pennetta	4	6	2

Second round
1	(Serbia) J Janković	1	2
Q	(Kazakhstan) Z Diyas	6	6
(Ukraine) K Bondarenko	0	0
6	(Russia) M Kirilenko	6	6
(Russia) A Chakvetadze	6	6
Q	(Ukraine) M Koryttseva	1	2
(Russia) V Dushevina	6	6
(Russia) E Vesnina	4	2

Quarterfinals
Q	(Kazakhstan) Z Diyas	1	2
6	(Russia) M Kirilenko	6	6
(Russia) A Chakvetadze	3	6^{7}
(Russia) V Dushevina	6	7^{9}

Semifinals
6	(Russia) M Kirilenko	6	6
(Russia) V Dushevina	1	1

=== Bottom half ===
First round
8	(Spain) MJ Martínez Sánchez	6	5	6
WC	(Russia) A Kudryavtseva	1	7	1
WC	(Russia) D Gavrilova	5	1
(Ukraine) A Bondarenko	7	6
Q	(Russia) K Pervak	1	6	2
(Bulgaria) T Pironkova	6	3	6
(Slovakia) D Cibulková	7^{7}	2	6
4	(Russia) A Pavlyuchenkova	6^{5}	6	0
7	(Russia) A Kleybanova	6	6^{4}	7^{7}
(Czech Republic) L Šafářová	2	7^{7}	6^{1}
(Italy) S Errani	6	6
Q	(Ukraine) O Savchuk	3	4
(Belarus) O Govortsova	6	5	0
(Germany) A Petkovic	0	7	6

Second round
8	(Spain) MJ Martínez Sánchez	6	1	6
(Ukraine) A Bondarenko	4	6	1
(Bulgaria) T Pironkova	4	1
(Slovakia) D Cibulková	6	6
7	(Russia) A Kleybanova	7^{7}	6
(Italy) S Errani	6^{0}	4
(Germany) A Petkovic	4	6	1
2	(Belarus) V Azarenka	6	2	6

Quarterfinals
8	(Spain) MJ Martínez Sánchez	6	6
(Slovakia) D Cibulková	2	3
7	(Russia) A Kleybanova	1	3
2	(Belarus) V Azarenka	6	6

Semifinals
8	(Spain) MJ Martínez Sánchez	3	3
2	(Belarus) V Azarenka	6	6
