= 2010 Kremlin Cup – Men's singles =

Men's singles
- 2010 Kremlin Cup

Final
- Champion: (Serbia) Viktor Troicki
- Runner-up: (Cyprus) Marcos Baghdatis
- Score: 3–6, 6–4, 6–3

Details
- Draw: 28 (4 Q / 3 WC )
- Seeds: 8

Events
| Singles | men | women |
| Doubles | men | women |
| ← 2009 · | Kremlin Cup | · 2011 → |

Viktor Troicki defeated Marcos Baghdatis 3–6, 6–4, 6–3 in the final to win his first ATP singles title.

Mikhail Youzhny was the defending champion, but withdrew due to a viral infection.

== Seeds ==
The top four seeds received a bye into the second round.

1. (Russia) Nikolay Davydenko (second round)
2. (Russia) Mikhail Youzhny (withdrew due to a viral infection)
3. (France) Jo-Wilfried Tsonga (second round)
4. (Cyprus) Marcos Baghdatis (final)
5. (Czech Republic) Radek Štěpánek (quarterfinals)
6. (Kazakhstan) Andrey Golubev (second round)
7. (Ukraine) Sergiy Stakhovsky (second round)
8. (Serbia) Janko Tipsarević (first round)

== Draw ==
=== Key ===
- Q = Qualifier
- WC = Wild card
- LL = Lucky loser
- Alt = Alternate
- SE = Special exempt
- PR = Protected ranking
- ITF = ITF entry
- JE = Junior exempt
- w/o = Walkover
- r = Retired
- d = Defaulted
- SR = Special ranking

=== Finals ===
Semifinals
(Uruguay) Pablo Cuevas | 3 | 3
(Serbia) Viktor Troicki | 6 | 6
4 | (Cyprus) Marcos Baghdatis | 6 | 6^{5} | 7^{7}
(Uzbekistan) Denis Istomin | 4 | 7^{7} | 6^{2}

Final
(Serbia) Viktor Troicki | 3 | 6 | 6
4 | (Cyprus) Marcos Baghdatis | 6 | 4 | 3

=== Top half ===
First round
(Uruguay) P Cuevas | 6 | 7^{9}
(Germany) D Brands | 2 | 6^{7}
(France) J Chardy | 2 | 4
(Kazakhstan) M Kukushkin | 6 | 6
(Romania) V Hănescu | 6^{3} | 3
5 | (Czech Republic) R Štěpánek | 7^{7} | 6
WC | (Russia) D Tursunov | 7 | 4 | 3
(Serbia) V Troicki | 5 | 6 | 6
Q | (Russia) A Kuznetsov | 6^{4} | 3
Q | (Romania) V Crivoi | 7^{7} | 6
(Argentina) H Zeballos | 4 | 6 | 6
8 | (Serbia) J Tipsarević | 6 | 4 | 3

Second round
1 | (Russia) N Davydenko | 6^{6} | 6^{5}
(Uruguay) P Cuevas | 7^{8} | 7^{7}
(Kazakhstan) M Kukushkin | 3 | 2
5 | (Czech Republic) R Štěpánek | 6 | 6
3 | (France) J-W Tsonga | 6 | 3 | 5
(Serbia) V Troicki | 3 | 6 | 7
Q | (Romania) V Crivoi | 5 | 6^{1}
(Argentina) H Zeballos | 7 | 7^{7}

Quarterfinals
(Uruguay) P Cuevas | 6 | 7^{7}
5 | (Czech Republic) R Štěpánek | 4 | 6^{3}
(Serbia) V Troicki | 6 | 6
(Argentina) H Zeballos | 2 | 1

Semifinals
(Uruguay) P Cuevas | 3 | 3
(Serbia) V Troicki | 6 | 6

=== Bottom half ===
First round
7 | (Ukraine) S Stakhovsky | 6 | 3 | 7
(United States) M Russell | 4 | 6 | 5
(Ukraine) A Dolgopolov | 6 | 6
Q | (Russia) I Belyaev | 2 | 4
(Italy) P Starace | 3 | 7 | 6
WC | (Russia) T Gabashvili | 6 | 5 | 1
6 | (Kazakhstan) A Golubev | 6 | 6
PR | (Argentina) M González | 3 | 2
Q | (Russia) I Kunitsyn | 6 | 7^{7}
WC | (Russia) I Andreev | 4 | 6^{5}
(Ukraine) I Marchenko | 7^{7} | 2 | 2
(Uzbekistan) D Istomin | 6^{4} | 6 | 6

Second round
7 | (Ukraine) S Stakhovsky | 2 | 6^{4}
(Ukraine) A Dolgopolov | 6 | 7^{7}
(Italy) P Starace | 4 | 3
4 | (Cyprus) M Baghdatis | 6 | 6
6 | (Kazakhstan) A Golubev | 4 | 5
Q | (Russia) I Kunitsyn | 6 | 7
(Uzbekistan) D Istomin | 1 | 7 | 6
LL | (France) P-H Mathieu | 6 | 5 | 3

Quarterfinals
(Ukraine) A Dolgopolov | 2 | 6^{7}
4 | (Cyprus) M Baghdatis | 6 | 7^{9}
Q | (Russia) I Kunitsyn | 2 | 4
(Uzbekistan) D Istomin | 6 | 6

Semifinals
4 | (Cyprus) M Baghdatis | 6 | 6^{5} | 7^{7}
(Uzbekistan) D Istomin | 4 | 7^{7} | 6^{2}
