= 2011 Kremlin Cup – Men's singles =

Men's singles
- 2011 Kremlin Cup

Final
- Champion: (Serbia) Janko Tipsarević
- Runner-up: (Serbia) Viktor Troicki
- Score: 6–4, 6–2

Details
- Draw: 28 (4 Q / 3 WC )
- Seeds: 8

Events
Singles	men	women
Doubles	men	women
← 2010 ·	Kremlin Cup	· 2012 →

Viktor Troicki was the defending champion, but his compatriot Janko Tipsarević defeated him in the first all-Serbian final in tennis history 6–4, 6–2.

== Seeds ==
The top four seeds receive a bye into the second round.

1. (Serbia) Janko Tipsarević (champion)
2. (Serbia) Viktor Troicki (final)
3. (Ukraine) Alexandr Dolgopolov (second round)
4. (Russia) Nikolay Davydenko (semifinals)
5. (United States) Alex Bogomolov Jr. (quarterfinals)
6. (Russia) Dmitry Tursunov (quarterfinals)
7. (Luxembourg) Gilles Müller (second round)
8. (Italy) Andreas Seppi (second round)

== Main draw ==
=== Key ===
- Q = Qualifier
- WC = Wild card
- LL = Lucky loser
- Alt = Alternate
- SE = Special exempt
- PR = Protected ranking
- ITF = ITF entry
- JE = Junior exempt
- w/o = Walkover
- r = Retired
- d = Defaulted
- SR = Special ranking

=== Finals ===
Semifinals
1	(Serbia) Janko Tipsarević	6	7
4	(Russia) Nikolay Davydenko	2	5
Q	(France) Jérémy Chardy	4	4
2	(Serbia) Viktor Troicki	6	6

Final
1	(Serbia) Janko Tipsarević	6	6
2	(Serbia) Viktor Troicki	4	2

=== Top half ===
First round
WC	(Russia) A Kuznetsov	5	6	3
(Russia) I Kunitsyn	7	4	6
(France) J Benneteau	6	6
WC	(Russia) E Donskoy	4	3
(Spain) A Ramos	6^{5}	4
6	(Russia) D Tursunov	7^{7}	6
(Slovakia) K Beck	2	4
WC	(Russia) T Gabashvili	6	6
(Ukraine) S Stakhovsky	2	4
Q	(Germany) M Berrer	6	6
(Russia) I Andreev	6	3	6^{4}
8	(Italy) A Seppi	2	6	7^{7}

Second round
1	(Serbia) J Tipsarević	6^{5}	6	6
(Russia) I Kunitsyn	7^{7}	1	0
(France) J Benneteau	3	6^{1}
6	(Russia) D Tursunov	6	7^{7}
4	(Russia) N Davydenko	7	6
WC	(Russia) T Gabashvili	5	2
Q	(Germany) M Berrer	4	6	6
8	(Italy) A Seppi	6	3	2

Quarterfinals
1	(Serbia) J Tipsarević	6	6
6	(Russia) D Tursunov	4	2
4	(Russia) N Davydenko	6	6
Q	(Germany) M Berrer	3	2

Semifinals
1	(Serbia) J Tipsarević	6	7
4	(Russia) N Davydenko	2	5

=== Bottom half ===
First round
7	(Luxembourg) G Müller	7^{7}	6
Q	(Russia) K Kravchuk	6^{5}	4
(Germany) P Kohlschreiber	7	6
(Argentina) C Berlocq	5	3
Q	(France) J Chardy	6	6^{5}	7^{7}
(Italy) P Starace	3	7^{7}	6^{2}
5	(United States) A Bogomolov Jr.	3	6	6
Q	(Serbia) D Lajović	6	3	4
(Kazakhstan) M Kukushkin	7^{7}	7
(Czech Republic) L Rosol	6^{5}	5
(Austria) A Haider-Maurer	2	7^{7}	3
(Spain) P Riba	6	6^{1}	6

Second round
7	(Luxembourg) G Müller	6^{4}	3
(Germany) P Kohlschreiber	7^{7}	6
Q	(France) J Chardy	6	7^{8}
3	(Ukraine) A Dolgopolov	3	6^{6}
5	(United States) A Bogomolov Jr.	6	3	6
(Kazakhstan) M Kukushkin	4	6	4
(Spain) P Riba	4	4
2	(Serbia) V Troicki	6	6

Quarterfinals
(Germany) P Kohlschreiber	4	3
Q	(France) J Chardy	6	6
5	(United States) A Bogomolov Jr.	6^{6}	7^{7}	6^{1}
2	(Serbia) V Troicki	7^{8}	6^{1}	7^{7}

Semifinals
Q	(France) J Chardy	4	4
2	(Serbia) V Troicki	6	6
