= 2011 Kremlin Cup – Women's singles =

Women's singles
- 2011 Kremlin Cup

Final
- Champion: (Slovakia) Dominika Cibulková
- Runner-up: (Estonia) Kaia Kanepi
- Score: 3–6, 7–6^{(7–1)}, 7–5

Details
- Seeds: 8

Events
Singles	men	women
Doubles	men	women
- Kremlin Cup

Victoria Azarenka was the defending champion, but chose to compete at the BGL Luxembourg Open instead.

Dominika Cibulková won her first WTA tour title, defeating Kaia Kanepi in the final 3–6, 7–6^{(7–1)}, 7–5.

== Seeds ==
The top four seeds receive a bye into the second round.

1. (Russia) Vera Zvonareva (quarterfinals)
2. (Poland) Agnieszka Radwańska (second round)
3. (France) Marion Bartoli (quarterfinals, withdrew due to viral illness)
4. (Italy) Francesca Schiavone (second round)
5. (Serbia) Jelena Janković (first round)
6. (Russia) Svetlana Kuznetsova (quarterfinals)
7. (Italy) Roberta Vinci (first round)
8. (Slovakia) Dominika Cibulková (champion)

== Main draw ==
Key

- Q = Qualifier
- WC = Wild card
- LL = Lucky loser
- Alt = Alternate
- ITF = ITF entry
- PR = Protected ranking
- SR = Special ranking
- SE = Special exempt
- JE = Junior exempt
- JR = Junior Accelerator Programme entrant
- CO = College Accelerator Programme entrant
- NG = Next Gen Accelerator Program entrant
- w/o = Walkover
- r = Retired
- d = Defaulted

=== Finals ===
Semifinals
8	(Slovakia) Dominika Cibulková	6	6
(Russia) Elena Vesnina	0	2
(Estonia) Kaia Kanepi	6^{4}	6	6
(Czech Republic) Lucie Šafářová	7^{7}	4	3

Final
8	(Slovakia) Dominika Cibulková	3	7^{7}	7
(Estonia) Kaia Kanepi	6	6^{1}	5

=== Top half ===
First round
(Serbia) B Jovanovski	6	6
PR	(Ukraine) A Bondarenko	3	0
Q	(Ukraine) O Savchuk	3	1
(Czech Republic) K Zakopalová	6	6
(Slovenia) P Hercog	3	6^{3}
8	(Slovakia) D Cibulková	6	7^{7}
(Russia) K Pervak	7	6
Q	(Kazakhstan) G Voskoboeva	5	4
(Russia) E Vesnina	6	6
WC	(Russia) A Kudryavtseva	0	1
Q	(Russia) E Ivanova	6	1	6
5	(Serbia) J Janković	4	6	4

Second round
1	(Russia) V Zvonareva	6	6
(Serbia) B Jovanovski	1	1
(Czech Republic) K Zakopalová	6^{5}	2
8	(Slovakia) D Cibulková	7^{7}	6
3	(France) M Bartoli	6	6
(Russia) K Pervak	1	1
(Russia) E Vesnina	6	6
Q	(Russia) E Ivanova	3	4

Quarterfinals
1	(Russia) V Zvonareva	6	4	4
8	(Slovakia) D Cibulková	4	6	6
3	(France) M Bartoli
(Russia) E Vesnina	w/o

Semifinals
8	(Slovakia) D Cibulková	6	6
(Russia) E Vesnina	0	2

=== Bottom half ===
First round
6	(Russia) S Kuznetsova	6	6
Q	(France) A Cornet	3	3
(Croatia) P Martić	1	0^{r}
(Bulgaria) T Pironkova	6	0
(Italy) S Errani	0	5
(Estonia) K Kanepi	6	7
7	(Italy) R Vinci	6^{4}	4
(Russia) V Dushevina	7^{7}	6
(Russia) N Petrova	6	7^{7}
WC	(Russia) E Rodina	4	6^{3}
(Czech Republic) L Šafářová	6^{7}	6	6
LL	(Spain) A Parra Santonja	7^{9}	4	3

Second round
6	(Russia) S Kuznetsova	7	7
(Bulgaria) T Pironkova	5	5
(Estonia) K Kanepi	6	5	7^{9}
4/WC	(Italy) F Schiavone	4	7	6^{7}
(Russia) V Dushevina	6	7^{7}
(Russia) N Petrova	2	6^{3}
(Czech Republic) L Šafářová	6	4	6
2	(Poland) A Radwańska	4	6	4

Quarterfinals
6	(Russia) S Kuznetsova	1	2
(Estonia) K Kanepi	6	6
(Russia) V Dushevina	4	4
(Czech Republic) L Šafářová	6	6

Semifinals
(Estonia) K Kanepi	6^{4}	6	6
(Czech Republic) L Šafářová	7^{7}	4	3
