= 2010 Kremlin Cup – Women's doubles =

Women's doubles
- 2010 Kremlin Cup

Final
- Champions: (Argentina) Gisela Dulko (Italy) Flavia Pennetta
- Runners-up: (Italy) Sara Errani (Spain) María José Martínez Sánchez
- Score: 6–3, 2–6, [10–6]

Details
- Seeds: 4

Events
Singles	men	women
Doubles	men	women
← 2009 ·	Kremlin Cup	· 2011 →

Maria Kirilenko and Nadia Petrova were the defending champions, but only Kirilenko tried to defend her title.
She partnered with Victoria Azarenka but they lost in semifinals against Gisela Dulko and Flavia Pennetta.
Dulko and Pennetta eventually won in the final against Sara Errani and María José Martínez Sánchez, 6–3, 2–6, [10–6].

== Seeds ==
1. (Argentina) Gisela Dulko / (Italy) Flavia Pennetta (champions)
2. (United States) Liezel Huber / (Russia) Elena Vesnina (first round)
3. (Italy) Sara Errani / (Spain) María José Martínez Sánchez (final)
4. (Belarus) Victoria Azarenka / (Russia) Maria Kirilenko (semifinals)

== Draw ==
=== Key ===
- Q = Qualifier
- WC = Wild card
- LL = Lucky loser
- Alt = Alternate
- SE = Special exempt
- PR = Protected ranking
- ITF = ITF entry
- JE = Junior exempt
- w/o = Walkover
- r = Retired
- d = Defaulted
- SR = Special ranking

=== Draw ===
First round
1	(Argentina) G Dulko (Italy) F Pennetta	6	6
(Russia) M Kondratieva (Czech Republic) K Zakopalová	2	3
(Romania) A Dulgheru (Romania) M Niculescu	6	6
(Ukraine) O Savchuk (Czech Republic) V Uhlířová	3	2
4	(Belarus) V Azarenka (Russia) M Kirilenko	6	6
(Russia) A Kleybanova (Russia) E Makarova	2	4
(Russia) V Dushevina (Russia) A Pavlyuchenkova	5	7	[10]
(Ukraine) M Koryttseva (Russia) A Panova	7	6^{5}	[7]
(Russia) V Diatchenko (Belarus) T Poutchek	7	5	[10]
WC	(Russia) A Chakvetadze (Russia) K Pervak	5	7	[7]
(Poland) K Jans (Poland) A Rosolska	1	3
3	(Italy) S Errani (Spain) MJ Martínez Sánchez	6	6
(Uzbekistan) A Amanmuradova (Belarus) D Kustova	6	3	[10]
(Ukraine) A Bondarenko (Ukraine) K Bondarenko	4	6	[4]
(Belarus) O Govortsova (Russia) A Kudryavtseva	6^{2}	6	[12]
2	(United States) L Huber (Russia) E Vesnina	7	4	[10]

Quarterfinals
1	(Argentina) G Dulko (Italy) F Pennetta	6	6
(Romania) A Dulgheru (Romania) M Niculescu	1	1
4	(Belarus) V Azarenka (Russia) M Kirilenko	6	6
(Russia) V Dushevina (Russia) A Pavlyuchenkova	2	4
(Russia) V Diatchenko (Belarus) T Poutchek	1	5
3	(Italy) S Errani (Spain) MJ Martínez Sánchez	6	7
(Uzbekistan) A Amanmuradova (Belarus) D Kustova	6	6
(Belarus) O Govortsova (Russia) A Kudryavtseva	2	3

Semifinals
1	(Argentina) G Dulko (Italy) F Pennetta	7	6
4	(Belarus) V Azarenka (Russia) M Kirilenko	6^{3}	4
3	(Italy) S Errani (Spain) MJ Martínez Sánchez	6	6
(Uzbekistan) A Amanmuradova (Belarus) D Kustova	2	1

Finals
1	(Argentina) G Dulko (Italy) F Pennetta	6	2	[10]
3	(Italy) S Errani (Spain) MJ Martínez Sánchez	3	6	[6]
