= 2011 Kremlin Cup – Men's doubles =

Men's doubles
- 2011 Kremlin Cup

Final
- Champions: (Czech Republic) František Čermák (Slovakia) Filip Polášek
- Runners-up: (Argentina) Carlos Berlocq (Spain) David Marrero
- Score: 6–3, 6–1

Details
- Draw: 16
- Seeds: 4

Events
| Singles | men | women |
| Doubles | men | women |
| ← 2010 · | Kremlin Cup | · 2012 → |

Igor Kunitsyn and Dmitry Tursunov are the defending champions, but eventually they lost in the first round to Alex Bogomolov Jr. and Mikhail Kukushkin.
František Čermák and Filip Polášek won the title, defeating Carlos Berlocq and David Marrero 6–3, 6–1 in the final.

== Seeds ==
1. (Czech Republic) František Čermák / (Slovakia) Filip Polášek (champions)
2. (Italy) Daniele Bracciali / (Italy) Potito Starace (first round)
3. (United Kingdom) Colin Fleming / (United Kingdom) Ross Hutchins (first round)
4. (Czech Republic) Lukáš Dlouhý / (Ukraine) Alexandr Dolgopolov (first round)

== Draw ==
=== Key ===
- Q = Qualifier
- WC = Wild card
- LL = Lucky loser
- Alt = Alternate
- ITF = ITF entry
- PR = Protected ranking
- SR = Special ranking
- SE = Special exempt
- JE = Junior exempt
- JR = Junior Accelerator Programme entrant
- CO = College Accelerator Programme entrant
- NG = Next Gen Accelerator Program entrant
- w/o = Walkover
- r = Retired
- d = Defaulted

=== Draw ===
First round
1 | (Czech Republic) F Čermák (Slovakia) F Polášek | 7 | 4 | [10]
(Ukraine) S Stakhovsky (Russia) M Youzhny | 5 | 6 | [7]
(United States) J Cerretani (Germany) P Marx | 6 | 6
(Slovakia) K Beck (Slovakia) M Mertiňák | 4 | 2
3 | (United Kingdom) C Fleming (United Kingdom) R Hutchins | 4 | 4
WC | (Russia) E Donskoy (Russia) T Gabashvili | 6 | 6
WC | (Russia) V Baluda (Russia) A Kuznetsov | 7 | 6^{3} | [5]
(Philippines) TC Huey (Canada) A Shamasdin | 5 | 7^{7} | [10]
(France) J Benneteau (United Kingdom) J Murray | 6 | 7^{7}
(Italy) A Seppi (Slovakia) I Zelenay | 4 | 6^{3}
(Argentina) C Berlocq (Spain) D Marrero | 7 | 7^{7}
4 | (Czech Republic) L Dlouhý (Ukraine) A Dolgopolov | 5 | 6^{4}
(United States) A Bogomolov Jr. (Kazakhstan) M Kukushkin | 7 | 3 | [10]
(Russia) I Kunitsyn (Russia) D Tursunov | 5 | 6 | [8]
(Russia) M Elgin (Uzbekistan) D Istomin | 7 | 6
2 | (Italy) D Bracciali (Italy) P Starace | 5 | 3

Quarterfinals
1 | (Czech Republic) F Čermák (Slovakia) F Polášek | 2 | 6 | [11]
(United States) J Cerretani (Germany) P Marx | 6 | 3 | [9]
WC | (Russia) E Donskoy (Russia) T Gabashvili | 7^{7} | 4 | [10]
(Philippines) TC Huey (Canada) A Shamasdin | 6^{3} | 6 | [4]
(France) J Benneteau (United Kingdom) J Murray | 5 | 3
(Argentina) C Berlocq (Spain) D Marrero | 7 | 6
(United States) A Bogomolov Jr. (Kazakhstan) M Kukushkin | 6 | 6
(Russia) M Elgin (Uzbekistan) D Istomin | 3 | 1

Semifinals
1 | (Czech Republic) F Čermák (Slovakia) F Polášek | 6 | 6
WC | (Russia) E Donskoy (Russia) T Gabashvili | 1 | 1
(Argentina) C Berlocq (Spain) D Marrero | 6 | 6
(United States) A Bogomolov Jr. (Kazakhstan) M Kukushkin | 2 | 4

Final
1 | (Czech Republic) F Čermák (Slovakia) F Polášek | 6 | 6
(Argentina) C Berlocq (Spain) D Marrero | 3 | 1
