= 2010 Kremlin Cup – Men's doubles =

Men's doubles
- 2010 Kremlin Cup

Final
- Champions: (Russia) Igor Kunitsyn (Russia) Dmitry Tursunov
- Runners-up: (Serbia) Janko Tipsarević (Serbia) Viktor Troicki
- Score: 7–6^{(10–8)}, 6–3

Details
- Draw: 16
- Seeds: 4

Events
| Singles | men | women |
| Doubles | men | women |
| ← 2009 · | Kremlin Cup | · 2011 → |

Pablo Cuevas and Marcel Granollers were the defending champions; however, Granollers chose to not compete.
Cuevas partnered up with Michael Russell, but they were eliminated by Jérémy Chardy and Lukáš Dlouhý in the quarterfinal.
Igor Kunitsyn and Dmitry Tursunov, which received wildcards into the doubles draw, won this event. They defeated Janko Tipsarević and Viktor Troicki 7–6^{(10–8)}, 6–3 in the final.

== Seeds ==
1. (India) Rohan Bopanna / (Pakistan) Aisam-ul-Haq Qureshi (quarterfinals)
2. (France) Jérémy Chardy / (Czech Republic) Lukáš Dlouhý (semifinals)
3. (Slovakia) Filip Polášek / (Slovakia) Igor Zelenay (first round)
4. (United Kingdom) Colin Fleming / (United Kingdom) Ken Skupski (first round)

== Draw ==
=== Key ===
- Q = Qualifier
- WC = Wild card
- LL = Lucky loser
- Alt = Alternate
- SE = Special exempt
- PR = Protected ranking
- ITF = ITF entry
- JE = Junior exempt
- w/o = Walkover
- r = Retired
- d = Defaulted
- SR = Special ranking

=== Draw ===
First round
1 | (India) R Bopanna (Pakistan) A-u-H Qureshi | 6 | 3 | [10]
(Czech Republic) L Friedl (Romania) V Hănescu | 1 | 6 | [8]
(Serbia) D Vemić (Croatia) L Zovko | 6^{5} | 5
(Serbia) J Tipsarević (Serbia) V Troicki | 7^{7} | 7
4 | (United Kingdom) C Fleming (United Kingdom) K Skupski | 6^{4} | 7 | [8]
(Australia) S Huss (United Kingdom) R Hutchins | 7^{7} | 5 | [10]
(Argentina) M González (Argentina) H Zeballos | 5 | 6 | [10]
(Ukraine) S Stakhovsky (Russia) M Youzhny | 7 | 4 | [8]
WC | (Russia) T Gabashvili (Russia) A Kuznetsov | 6 | 6
(Kazakhstan) A Golubev (Uzbekistan) D Istomin | 2 | 3
WC | (Russia) I Kunitsyn (Russia) D Tursunov | 6 | 6
3 | (Slovakia) F Polášek (Slovakia) I Zelenay | 4 | 3
(Italy) D Bracciali (Italy) P Starace | 6^{5} | 7^{9} | [8]
(Uruguay) P Cuevas (United States) M Russell | 7^{7} | 6^{7} | [10]
(United States) R Ram (Czech Republic) R Štěpánek | 3 | 5
2 | (France) J Chardy (Czech Republic) L Dlouhý | 6 | 7

Quarterfinals
1 | (India) R Bopanna (Pakistan) A-u-H Qureshi | 4 | 5
(Serbia) J Tipsarević (Serbia) V Troicki | 6 | 7
(Australia) S Huss (United Kingdom) R Hutchins | 5 | 3
(Argentina) M González (Argentina) H Zeballos | 7 | 6
WC | (Russia) T Gabashvili (Russia) A Kuznetsov | 5 | 3
WC | (Russia) I Kunitsyn (Russia) D Tursunov | 7 | 6
(Uruguay) P Cuevas (United States) M Russell | 3 | 2
2 | (France) J Chardy (Czech Republic) L Dlouhý | 6 | 6

Semifinals
(Serbia) J Tipsarević (Serbia) V Troicki | 4 | 6 | [10]
(Argentina) M González (Argentina) H Zeballos | 6 | 3 | [7]
WC | (Russia) I Kunitsyn (Russia) D Tursunov | 6 | 7^{7}
2 | (France) J Chardy (Czech Republic) L Dlouhý | 4 | 6^{4}

Final
(Serbia) J Tipsarević (Serbia) V Troicki | 6^{8} | 3
WC | (Russia) I Kunitsyn (Russia) D Tursunov | 7^{10} | 6
