= 2009 Kremlin Cup – Men's singles =

Men's singles
- 2009 Kremlin Cup

Final
- Champion: (Russia) Mikhail Youzhny
- Runner-up: (Serbia) Janko Tipsarević
- Score: 6–7^{(5–7)}, 6–0, 6–4

Details
- Draw: 32 (4 Q / 3 WC )
- Seeds: 8

Events
Singles	men	women
Doubles	men	women
← 2008 ·	Kremlin Cup	· 2010 →

Igor Kunitsyn was the defending champion, but lost to Evgeny Korolev in the first round.
Mikhail Youzhny won in the final 6–7^{(5–7)}, 6–0, 6–4 against Janko Tipsarević.

== Seeds ==
1. (Russia) Nikolay Davydenko (first round)
2. (Romania) Victor Hănescu (first round)
3. (Russia) Mikhail Youzhny (champion)
4. (Russia) Igor Andreev (first round)
5. (Uruguay) Pablo Cuevas (quarterfinals)
6. (Serbia) Janko Tipsarević (final)
7. (France) Fabrice Santoro (second round)
8. (Argentina) Martín Vassallo Argüello (first round)

== Draw ==
=== Key ===
- Q = Qualifier
- WC = Wild card
- LL = Lucky loser
- Alt = Alternate
- ITF = ITF entry
- PR = Protected ranking
- SR = Special ranking
- SE = Special exempt
- JE = Junior exempt
- JR = Junior Accelerator Programme entrant
- CO = College Accelerator Programme entrant
- NG = Next Gen Accelerator Program entrant
- w/o = Walkover
- r = Retired
- d = Defaulted

=== Finals ===
Semifinals
Q	(Ukraine) Illya Marchenko	1	4
6	(Serbia) Janko Tipsarević	6	6
3	(Russia) Mikhail Youzhny	6	6
Q	(Kazakhstan) Mikhail Kukushkin	2	1

Final
6	(Serbia) Janko Tipsarević	7	0	4
3	(Russia) Mikhail Youzhny	6^{5}	6	6

=== Top half ===
First round
1	(Russia) N Davydenko	6	4	2
(Russia) M Safin	4	6	6
(Russia) E Korolev	7^{8}	6
(Russia) I Kunitsyn	6^{6}	3
Q	(Ukraine) I Marchenko	1	6	4
(Uzbekistan) D Istomin	6	4	1^{r}
(Kazakhstan) A Golubev	7	6
8	(Argentina) M Vassallo Argüello	5	3
4	(Russia) I Andreev	3	7^{11}	6^{1}
(United States) R Ginepri	6	6^{9}	7^{7}
Q	(Germany) N Kiefer	4	0^{r}
(Spain) M Granollers	6	1
(France) M Gicquel	5	r
(Belgium) C Rochus	7
(Austria) D Köllerer	4	3
6	(Serbia) J Tipsarević	6	6

Second round
(Russia) M Safin	4	6^{4}
(Russia) E Korolev	6	7^{7}
Q	(Ukraine) I Marchenko	6	1	6
(Kazakhstan) A Golubev	1	6	4
(United States) R Ginepri	7^{7}	6
(Spain) M Granollers	6^{5}	0
(Belgium) C Rochus	4	1^{r}
6	(Serbia) J Tipsarević	6	2

Quarterfinals
(Russia) E Korolev	6	2	3
Q	(Ukraine) I Marchenko	0	6	6
(United States) R Ginepri	3	3
6	(Serbia) J Tipsarević	6	6

Semifinals
Q	(Ukraine) I Marchenko	1	4
6	(Serbia) J Tipsarević	6	6

=== Bottom half ===
First round
7	(France) F Santoro	4	6	6
WC	(Russia) A Kuznetsov	6	2	2
WC	(Russia) M Biryukov	0	2
Q	(Ukraine) S Stakhovsky	6	6
(Italy) P Starace	6	6
WC	(Russia) E Donskoy	3	3
(Argentina) H Zeballos	1	6^{5}
3	(Russia) M Youzhny	6	7^{7}
5	(Uruguay) P Cuevas	6	6
(Chinese Taipei) Y-h Lu	4	2
(Slovakia) K Beck	6	4	4
(Russia) T Gabashvili	3	6	6
Q	(Kazakhstan) M Kukushkin	6	5	6
(Italy) F Fognini	4	7	4
(United States) W Odesnik	5	7	6
2	(Romania) V Hănescu	7	5	4

Second round
7	(France) F Santoro	5	1
Q	(Ukraine) S Stakhovsky	7	6
(Italy) P Starace	1	1
3	(Russia) M Youzhny	6	6
5	(Uruguay) P Cuevas	3	6	6
(Russia) T Gabashvili	6	1	4
Q	(Kazakhstan) M Kukushkin	6	6
(United States) W Odesnik	3	4

Quarterfinals
Q	(Ukraine) S Stakhovsky	3	3
3	(Russia) M Youzhny	6	6
5	(Uruguay) P Cuevas	6	1	4
Q	(Kazakhstan) M Kukushkin	4	6	6

Semifinals
3	(Russia) M Youzhny	6	6
Q	(Kazakhstan) M Kukushkin	2	1
