= Tsvetana Pironkova =

Bulgarian tennis player (born 1987)

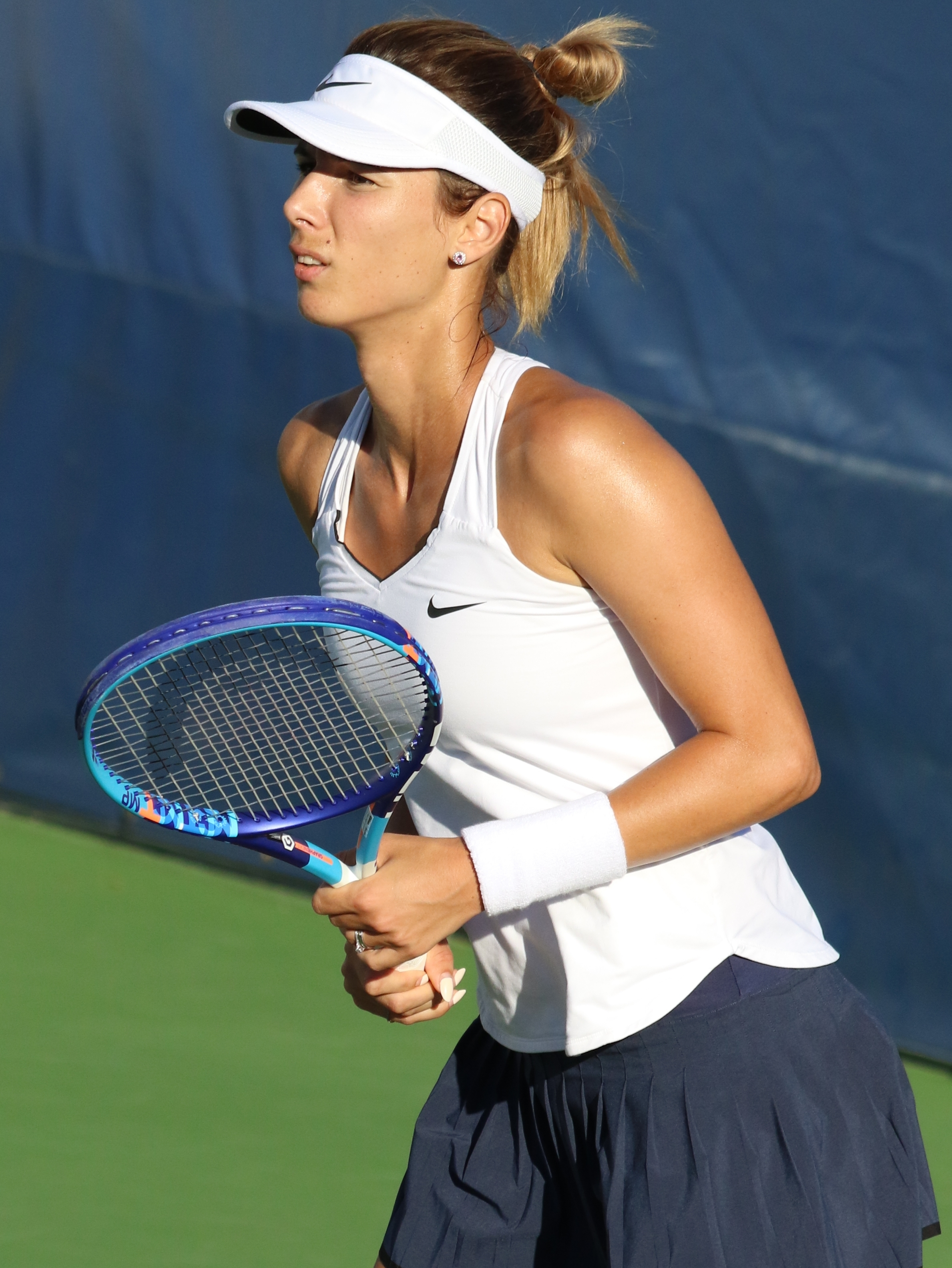
- Pironkova at the 2016 US Open
- Full name: Tsvetana Kirilova Pironkova
- Native name: Цветана Пиронкова
- Country (sports): Bulgaria
- Residence: Plovdiv, Bulgaria
- Born: 13 September 1987 (age 38) Plovdiv, People's Republic of Bulgaria
- Height: 1.80 m (5 ft 11 in)
- Turned pro: 2002
- Plays: Right (two-handed backhand)
- Prize money: $5,321,439
- Official website: tsvetanapironkova.com

Singles
- Career record: 413–321
- Career titles: 1
- Highest ranking: No. 31 (13 September 2010)

Grand Slam singles results
- Australian Open: 2R (2006, 2008, 2009, 2010, 2011, 2012, 2014, 2015)
- French Open: QF (2016)
- Wimbledon: SF (2010)
- US Open: QF (2020)

Other tournaments
- Olympic Games: 2R (2008, 2012)

Doubles
- Career record: 13–31
- Career titles: 0
- Highest ranking: No. 141 (23 March 2009)

Grand Slam doubles results
- Australian Open: 2R (2007, 2009)
- French Open: 2R (2006, 2008)
- Wimbledon: 2R (2011, 2013)
- US Open: 2R (2008)

Team competitions
- Fed Cup: 29–27 (singles 22–17)
- Hopman Cup: RR (2012)

Tsvetana Kirilova Pironkova (Bulgarian: Цветана Кирилова Пиронкова [tsvɛˈtanɐ piroŋˈkɔvɐ]; born 13 September 1987) is a Bulgarian former tennis player. Considered to be one of the best grass court players of her generation, she has been noted for her "cerebral" skills on the surface, reaching the semifinals at the Wimbledon Championships. Pironkova also found success playing on the quick hardcourts throughout her career, winning a title in Sydney and reaching the quarterfinals of the US Open.

Pironkova started playing tennis at the age of four on being introduced to the sport by her father. She made her WTA Tour debut at the İstanbul Cup in 2005, and achieved moderate success early in her career. That changed in 2010, when she entered Wimbledon with a 1–4 career record at the event, and went on reach the semifinals of the tournament, becoming first Bulgarian tennis player in history to reach the semifinal stage of a major in singles. She garnered wide recognition for her performance, and after her semifinal finish reached her highest singles ranking at No. 31 in September 2010. Pironkova followed it up with a quarterfinal run at the event the following year.

Pironkova won her first title on WTA Tour at the 2014 Sydney International, defeating three top-10 ranked players in a row. She defeated then world No. 2, Agnieszka Radwańska, in the fourth round of the 2016 French Open, reaching her first quarterfinal at a Grand Slam tournament other than Wimbledon. Following an injury in 2017, Pironkova announced a sabbatical from the sport - which was later extended to accommodate her maternity leave. Playing at her first professional tournament in over three years, she made a successful return at the 2020 US Open; she made it all the way to the quarterfinals, her first at a Grand Slam championship since 2016. Her performances in 2020 earned her the Bulgarian Sportsperson of the Year Award and a nomination for the WTA Comeback Player of the Year.

Pironkova has a total of twelve wins over top-10 ranked players and, at a point of time, held one of the longest streak of consecutive Grand Slam appearances at 47. Ahead of the 2017 Wimbledon Championships, she launched her own women's clothing and lifestyle brand, Pironetic.

== Personal life ==
Pironkova was born 1987 to athlete parents; her father Kiril Enchev Pironkov is a former canoeing champion, and her mother Radosveta Chinkova Nikolova is a former swimmer. She has one brother, Encho, and one sister, Elisaveta. Pironkova is the granddaughter of a prominent Bulgarian contemporary artist, Encho Pironkov. She started playing tennis at the age of four, when her father introduced her to the game. When she decided to play professionally, he became her coach.

Pironkova married her long-time boyfriend Mihail Mirchev, a former Bulgarian football player, in July 2016. In April 2018, she gave birth to a baby boy named Alexander. The couple had their second child, another boy, in July 2022.

== Career ==
=== First professional steps ===
Pironkova won the 2001 Atlantic Cup International Junior Tournament held in Bulgaria, and her career-high in juniors was world No. 227 in March 2002. After playing at a junior level and winning the Atlantic Cup, she made her senior international debut in 2002 at ITF tournaments. Early in her career, she won six singles titles on the ITF Circuit. Pironkova played her first professional match 2002 at a tournament in Bucharest at the age of 14. She won three matches in the qualifying draw, before reaching the final in the main draw, where she lost to Monica Niculescu. In September 2002, Pironkova played in Volos, Greece, where she lost only one set playing through the qualifying and main draw. She defeated Tina Schmassmann of Switzerland to win her first ITF event. In 2003, Pironkova won three singles titles, one in Orestiada and two in Istanbul.

At the age of 17, she played her first WTA Tour tournament, the Tier-III event in Istanbul. After winning two qualifying matches, she won three matches in the main draw, before losing in the semifinals to Venus Williams. Pironkova garnered widespread media attention by defeating Venus again in the first round of the 2006 Australian Open. She was ranked 94th in the world. However, in the next round, she lost to Laura Granville. In the first round of 2006 Wimbledon Championships, Pironkova came from a set down to defeat then-top-20 player Anna-Lena Grönefeld. However, in the second round, she lost to Agnieszka Radwańska in straight sets. On 16 November 2006, Pironkova reached a career-high singles ranking of 62.

=== 2007–2009: Top-50 debut ===
In 2007, Pironkova lost in the first rounds of the Australian Open, French Open, and Wimbledon. She played in qualifying rounds for the US Open and beat Zuzana Ondrášková, Marta Domachowska, and Stéphanie Dubois to reach the main draw, and drew Olga Puchkova in the first round, and won that match to set up a clash with world No. 1, Justine Henin, in the second round. Pironkova lost to Henin in straight sets. After the US Open in September, Pironkova played in one of the biggest Challenger events of the year in Bordeaux, winning the tournament with straight-set victories over Mathilde Johansson, Tatjana Malek and Alizé Cornet.

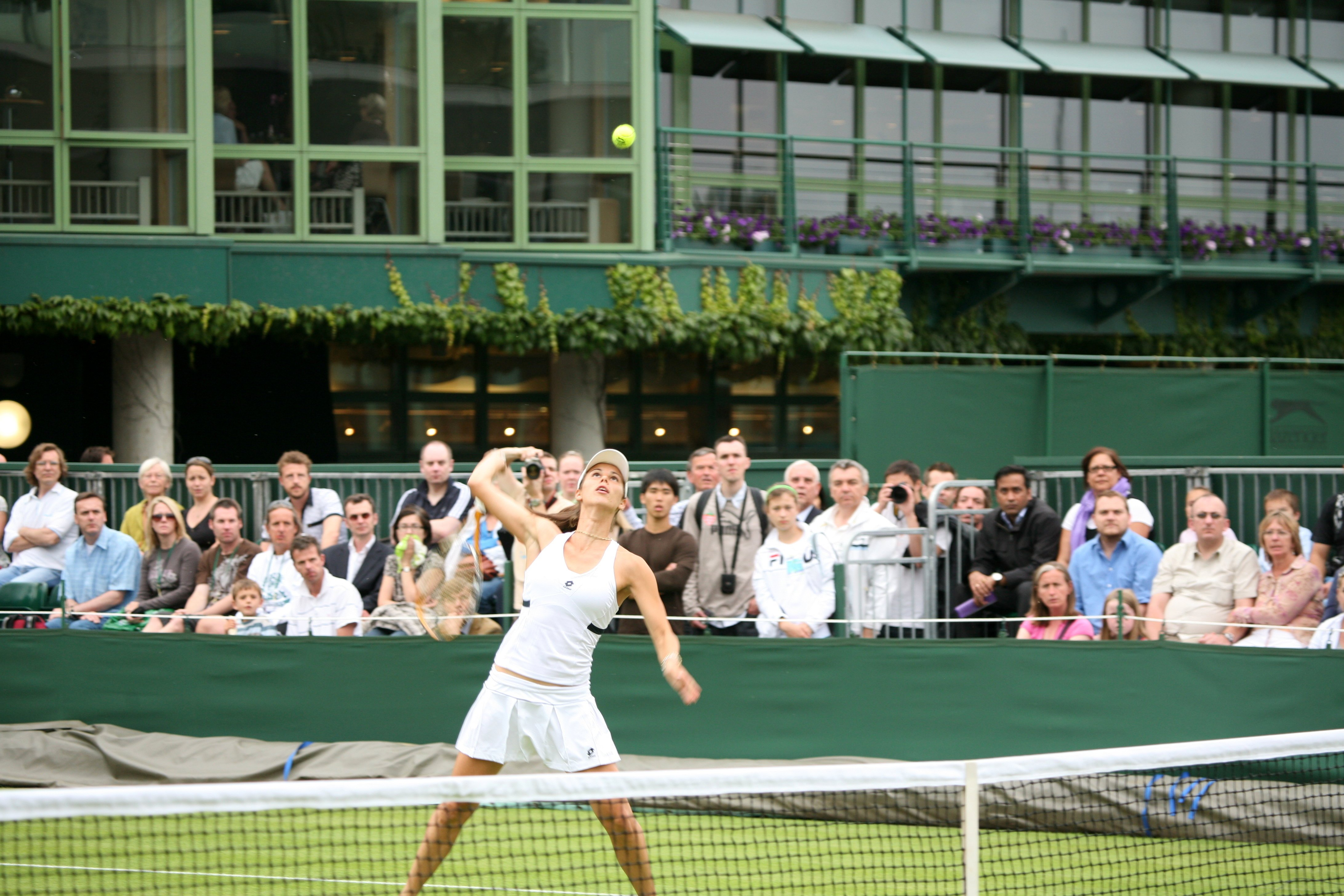
Pironkova at the 2009 Wimbledon Championships

Pironkova made a solid start to 2008, winning two qualifying matches at the Tier-II event in Sydney before bowing out in three sets to Dominika Cibulková. She reached the second round of the Australian Open, losing to second-seeded Svetlana Kuznetsova in straight sets. Pironkova caused another upset at the Italian Open, when as a qualifier, she beat top seed and world No. 3, Ana Ivanovic, in the second round for the biggest victory of her career at that time. Pironkova advanced to the quarterfinals, her first ever at a Tier-I event, when Victoria Azarenka retired during their third-round match with Pironkova leading, but, was defeated in three sets by Anna Chakvetadze. In September, Pironkova reached the final of an ITF event in Sofia, where she lost to Nuria Llagostera Vives. Pironkova ended the year ranked No. 46 in the world, marking her first ever top-50 season.

She kicked off her 2009 season playing at Brisbane where she lost in second round to Sara Errani, she made the quarterfinals at the Hobart International before she lost to Virginie Razzano. En route, she defeated then world No. 15, Patty Schnyder. It was the fifth top-20 win in her career.

At the Australian Open, Pironkova defeated Karolina Šprem in the first round before losing to 16th seeded Marion Bartoli. Playing at the Dubai Open, Pironkova reached the second round of the tournament losing to 12th seed Cibulková. Seeded No. 8 at the first Andalucia Tennis Experience, Pironkova lost in the first round to Roberta Vinci.

Pironkova won four matches at Stuttgart (three in qualifying) but lost to Agnieszka Radwańska in the round of 16. She also lost in the first rounds of the French Open and Wimbledon, both times to Jill Craybas in straight sets. Pironkova played her last tournament of the season at Kremlin Cup where she came up with better performance reaching the quarterfinals defeating top seeded Vera Zvonareva in round of 16 before losing out to Alona Bondarenko. She also reached two ITF quarterfinals at Sofia and Athens.

=== 2010: First major semifinal ===
Pironkova bowed out of the Australian Open with a straight sets second-round loss to the world No. 28, Shahar Pe'er, after having beaten Galina Voskoboeva in the opening match.

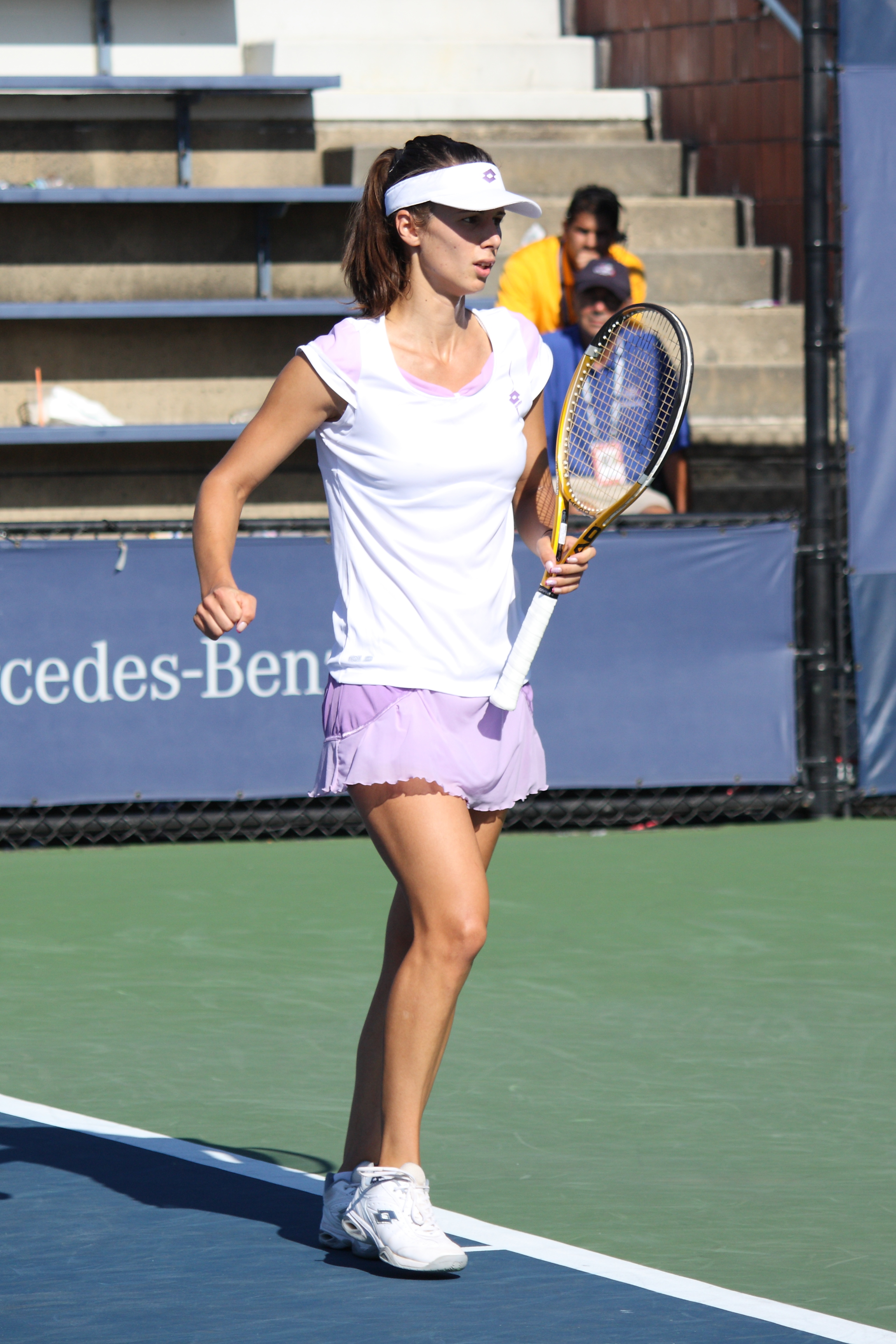
Pironkova at the 2010 US Open

She made her first ITF Circuit appearance of the year in the Fort Walton Beach tournament, where she reached the semifinals. In Warsaw she reached her first quarterfinal of the year after defeating Elena Dementieva. She then lost to the defending and eventual champion Alexandra Dulgheru. At the French Open, Pironkova lost to four-time tournament champion Justine Henin, in the first round.

Entering Wimbledon with a 1–4 career record at the event, Pironkova went beyond the second round of a Grand Slam tournament for the first time and become the first Bulgarian to reach a semifinal of a major tournament. Manuela Maleeva at the US Open in 1992 and 1993 represented Switzerland. Pironkova beat five-time champion Venus Williams before she lost her first Grand Slam semifinal to Vera Zvonareva, in three sets.

En route to her maiden semifinal appearance, Pironkova beat three Russian players Anna Lapushchenkova, Vera Dushevina, and Regina Kulikova, all in straight sets in the first three rounds and then upstaged Frenchwoman and 11th seed Marion Bartoli in the fourth round before taking out Williams.

Pironkova reached the second round in Palermo, beating Italian Anna Floris, before losing to Jill Craybas. In July, she scored a straight-set victory over Tatjana Malek in Istanbul. However, she then recorded three consecutive losses, two of which were to Anastasia Rodionova and one to Anna Lapushchenkova.

At the US Open, Pironkova lost in the second round to qualifier Mandy Minella. At the Pan Pacific Open, she beat Japanese qualifier Ayumi Morita, before losing to qualifier Roberta Vinci in the second round. In her last tournament of the year, the Kremlin Cup, Pironkova lost in the second round to Dominika Cibulková, and ended the year ranked No. 35 in the world.

=== 2011: Wimbledon quarterfinal ===
In the Australian Open, Pironkova fell in the second round to Monica Niculescu, having beaten Pauline Parmentier in the first round. She also fell in the second round at the Indian Wells Open to 16th seed Svetlana Kuznetsova in a tight three setter. She was seeded 32nd at the French Open and beat Casey Dellacqua in the first round, but yet again failed to cross the second-round hurdle as she lost to Gisela Dulko in straight sets.

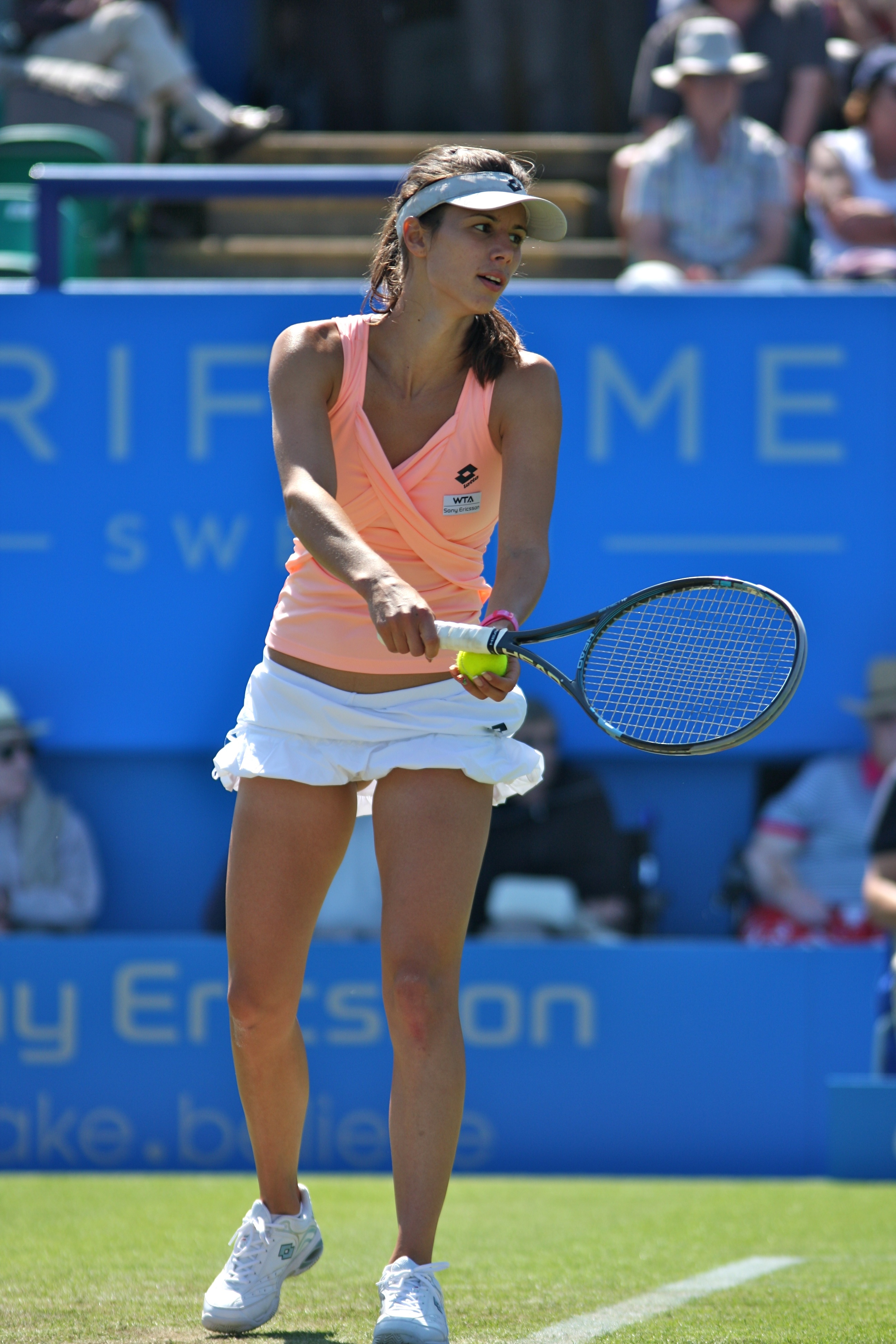
Pironkova at the 2011 Eastbourne International

At Wimbledon, Pironkova as the 32nd seed defeated in the third round world No. 3, Vera Zvonareva in straight sets, and went on to defeat former champion Venus Williams for the second year straight at Wimbledon, but then lost in the quarterfinals to eventual champion, Petra Kvitová.

In July, Pironkova competed in the Internazionali di Palermo, where she defeated Anna Tatishvili in the first round and Sorana Cîrstea in the second, before losing to Flavia Pennetta.

At the US Open, she defeated Virginie Razzano in the first round, but lost to world No. 13, Peng Shuai, in the second. She teamed with Chanelle Scheepers in the doubles tournament, but they were defeated by Arantxa Parra Santonja and Nuria Llagostera Vives.

At the Pan Pacific Open, Pironkova beat Gisela Dulko in the first round, but then lost to Vera Zvonareva in the second. At the Kremlin Cup, she beat Petra Martić, after her opponent retired due to injury. She then lost to Svetlana Kuznetsova in the second round and ended the year at No. 46.

=== 2012–2013: US Open and Wimbledon fourth rounds ===
Pironkova began 2012 representing Bulgaria at the Hopman Cup losing to Petra Kvitová. Pironkova and her partner Grigor Dimitrov defeated Tomáš Berdych and Kvitová in doubles. Despite their win, the team of Bulgaria lost to the Czech Republic (1–2), after Pironkova and Dimitrov lost their singles matches. Afterward, their team was victorious against Denmark 2–1. They scored a victory over the United States, but finished second in Group A and didn't qualify for the final.

At the Australian Open, Pironkova defeated Sania Mirza in the first round, before losing to Galina Voskoboeva in the second. She again represented Bulgaria in the Fed Cup, alongside Elitsa Kostova, Dia Evtimova, and Isabella Shinikova. They scored their first victory, beating Estonia (3–0). Later, the team lost to Austria, then lost again to Portugal and finished in seventh place in the group.

Pironkova competed in the Qatar Open, recording a victory over Angelique Kerber in the second round, but losing to Marion Bartoli in the third. She reached the second round of the Sony Ericsson Open, losing to Roberta Vinci. At the Brussels Open, Pironkova reached the quarterfinals, falling to Kaia Kanepi. She then reached the second round of the French Open, losing to former champion Francesca Schiavone.

At the Eastbourne International, Pironkova reached her second quarterfinal of the season, after defeating top-seeded Agnieszka Radwańska and qualifier Stéphanie Dubois, losing to eventual champion Tamira Paszek. At Wimbledon, Pironkova lost a second-round match to Maria Sharapova, in three sets. She reached the quarterfinals of the Swedish Open, losing to Polona Hercog.

At the US Open, Pironkova reached the third round of a Grand Slam besides Wimbledon for the first time. She defeated Camila Giorgi in the first round, Ayumi Morita in the second, and Sílvia Soler Espinosa in the third. In the fourth round, with a first US Open quarterfinal in sight, she was upset by former world No. 1, Ana Ivanovic. Her last tournament of the year was the Tournament of Champions, where she entered with a wildcard. She lost to Caroline Wozniacki in the semifinals.

Pironkova reached the quarterfinals of the 2013 Hobart International, where she lost to the defending champion Mona Barthel. She had beaten Irina-Camelia Begu and third seed Klára Koukalová in the round of 16. She was eliminated in the first round of the Australian Open by Romina Oprandi.

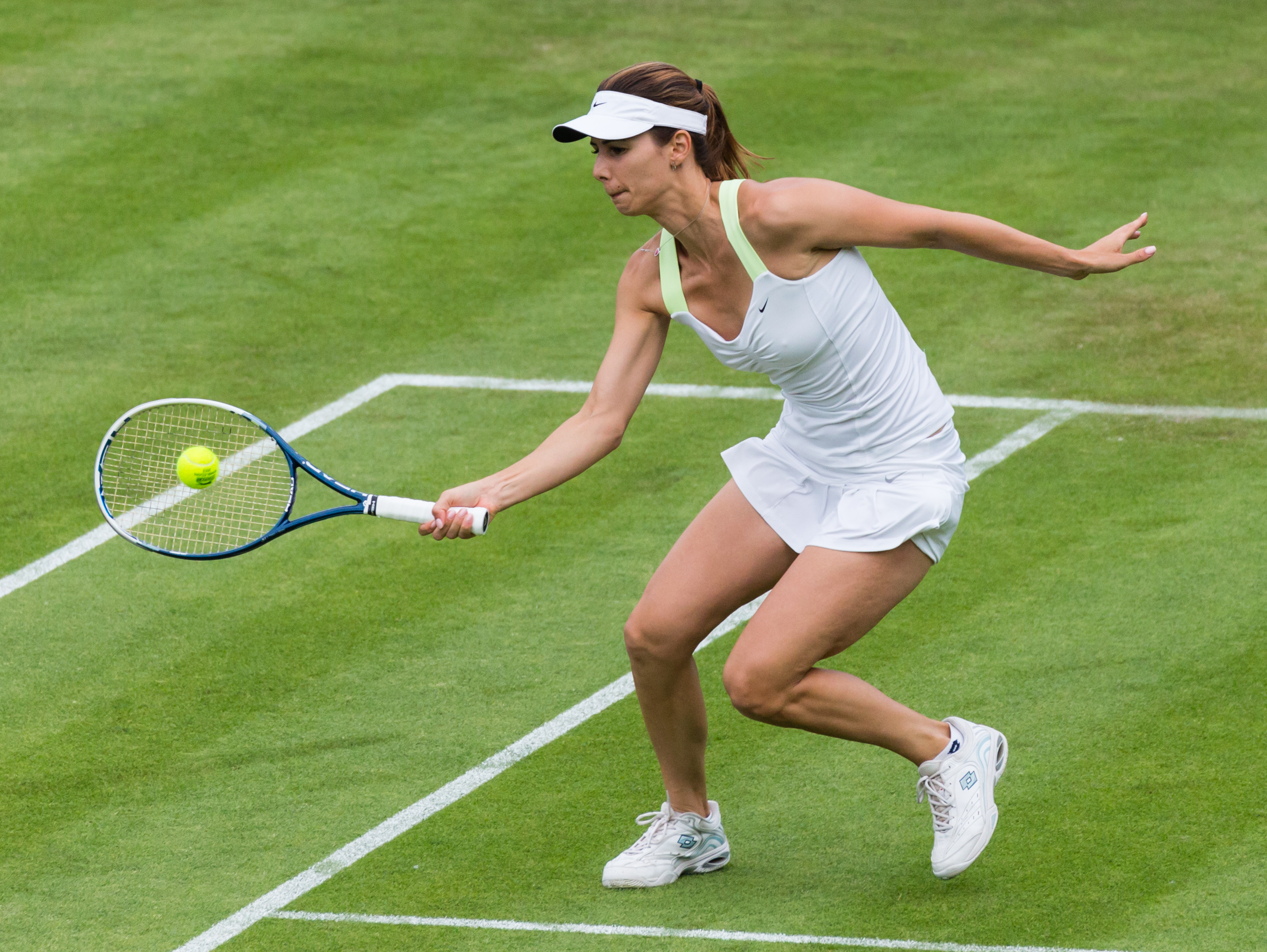
Pironkova at the 2013 Wimbledon Championships

In February, Pironkova took part in the Fed Cup tie vs. the Netherlands, defeating Arantxa Rus in straight sets, helping Bulgaria win the tie. She later helped Bulgaria win the tie against Luxembourg with a victory over veteran Anne Kremer. On 9 February, she played in the tie against Slovenia, and beat Tjasa Srimpf, who retired after losing the first game of the match, which advanced Bulgaria to the promotion playoffs. In the playoff tie against Great Britain on 10 February, Pironkova lost against Heather Watson in three sets, meaning that Bulgaria lost the tie and remained in the Fed Cup Europe/Africa Group I.

Following a string of first-round losses, Pironkova beat Karolína Plíšková in Marrakesh, but then lost in three sets to Lourdes Domínguez Lino, who went on to reach the final. She then lost a series of first-round matches throughout the remainder of the clay-court season, culminating with an early exit at the French Open.

On her preferred surface of grass, Pironkova snapped her losing streak at the Birmingham Classic, defeating Lauren Davis in the opening round. She dropped her second-round match to Sorana Cîrstea. She went on to play in 's-Hertogenbosch, where she beat Kristina Mladenovic and Irina-Camelia Begu, marking the first time since January that she reached the quarterfinals of a WTA event. She then lost to Carla Suárez Navarro in three sets.

At Wimbledon, she won against 21st seed Anastasia Pavlyuchenkova in the opening match and then went on to beat Barbora Strýcová and Petra Martić in the next two rounds. She came close to causing another huge upset at the tournament when she was up a set against fourth seed Agnieszka Radwańska, but eventually lost in three sets to the former finalist.

=== 2014: First WTA Tour title ===
Pironkova started the 2014 season ranked outside the top 100, at No. 107. She made it through the qualifying draw at the Sydney International. In the main draw, she defeated world No. 7, Sara Errani, in the quarterfinals and world No. 6, Petra Kvitová, in the semifinals, both in straight sets. She then defeated ninth ranked Angelique Kerber to win her first WTA Tour title. Pironkova was the first qualifier to win a Premier event in three and a half years, moved up 50 places in the world rankings, and was the first Bulgarian to win a WTA event in over ten years (after Magdalena Maleeva at the 2003 Birmingham Classic). Pironkova's run in Australia ended at the Australian Open with a second-round straight-set loss to Samantha Stosur, managing to win just two games. After the Australian Open, she reached a ranking of No. 52.

In February, Pironkova played in Doha, where she made it through the qualifying rounds. She beat veteran world No. 14, Roberta Vinci, in the first round, losing just six games. However, Pironkova's good run ended in the second round, where she lost to youngster No. 55, Annika Beck, after winning the first set on a tie-break. She then played in Dubai. In the first round of qualifying, she beat world No. 487, Vitalia Diatchenko, in a long and hard match (over 2 and a half hours), losing the first set on a tiebreak, saving a match point in the 10th game of the second set, then winning the second set again on a tiebreak, and was leading in the third set when her opponent retired. However, in what was her second loss against the Canadian out of two matches, she lost in the second qualifying round to youngster, No. 19, Eugenie Bouchard.

In March, Pironkova played at the Indian Wells hardcourt event, where she started in the main draw. She lost in straight sets to No. 38, Madison Keys, in the first round. She then played in Miami, where she beat Galina Voskoboeva and 25th seed Sorana Cîrstea without losing a set, but then lost in the third round to fifth seed Angelique Kerber, who went on to reach the quarterfinals. Pironkova moved five places up the rankings after Miami, to No. 42.

In April, she played at the indoor hardcourt event in Katowice, where she was seeded eighth. In the first round, Pironkova beat Andrea Hlaváčková, after losing the first set. In round two, in what was her fifth loss against the Israeli out of eight matches, she lost to world No. 90, Shahar Pe'er, whom she also lost to in this same event in 2013. Pironkova then played in the qualifying for the indoor clay court event in Stuttgart, where she was the top-ranked player at No. 40. In the first round of qualifying, she beat local teenager Tayisiya Morderger, but then lost to No. 221, Gioia Barbieri, in the second qualifying round.

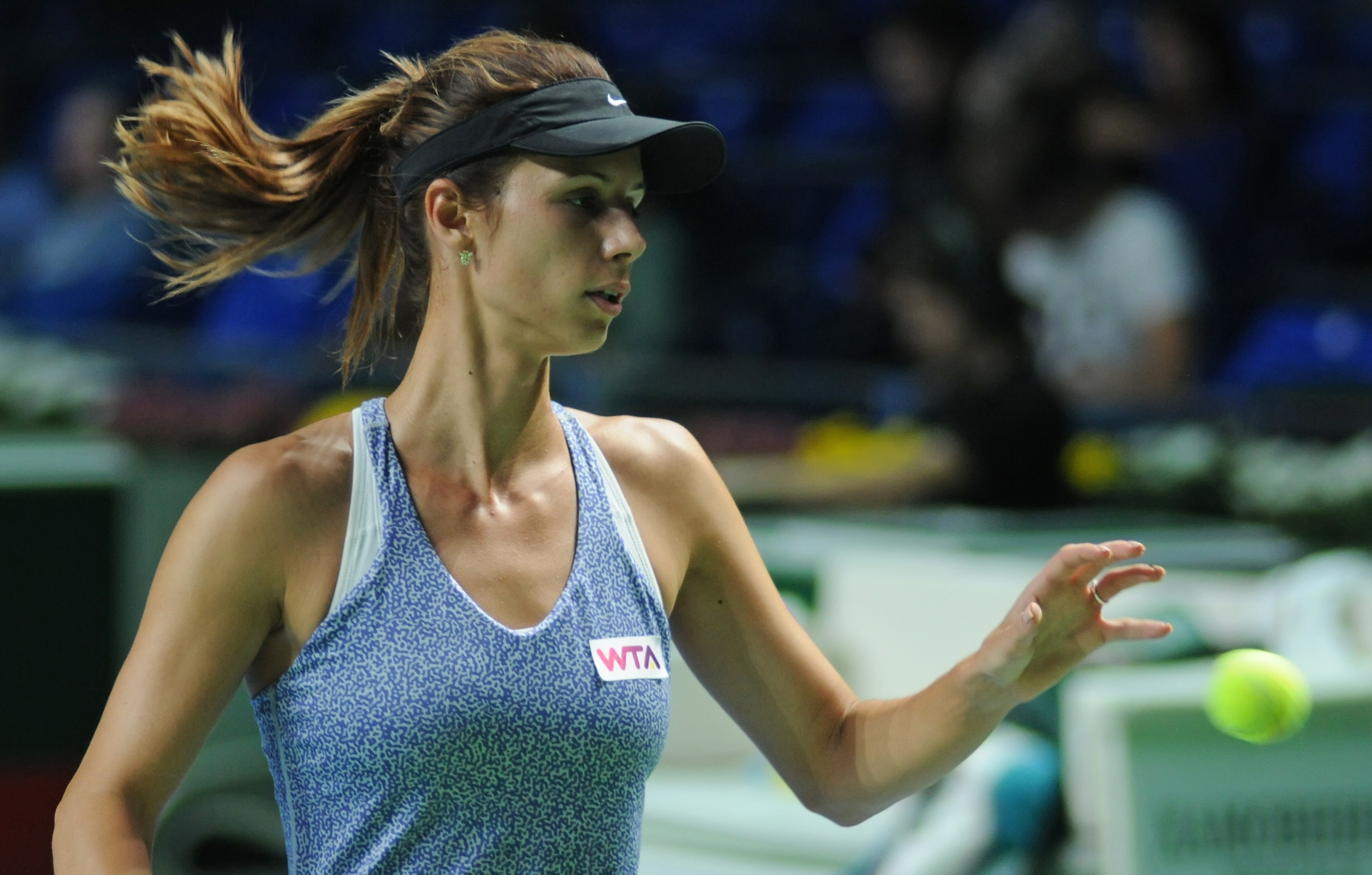
Pironkova at the Kremlin Cup 2014

In Madrid, where she started in the main draw and lost to wildcard No. 145, Lara Arruabarrena, in round one. Pironkova then played in Rome, where she lost to qualifier Petra Cetkovská in round one, despite easily winning the first set.

She then played at Roland Garros. In round one, she beat No. 49 Annika Beck (after losing the first on a tie-break), whom she had never beaten before. Pironkova then faced a major test in round two, in what was her fifth loss out of five matches, despite being a break up in the first set, to seventh seed Maria Sharapova, who went on to win the tournament.

Pironkova's first tournament for the grass-court season was the Eastbourne International, where in round one she lost to local wildcard, No. 70 Heather Watson, who went on to reach the semifinals. Pironkova then played Wimbledon, where she faced No. 57, Varvara Lepchenko, in the first round and lost in a match that was played over two days.

In July, she played at the Istanbul hardcourt event, where she was unseeded. In what was the second match between the two and second loss for Pironkova, she lost to No. 72 Stefanie Vögele in the first round. Pironkova played in Cincinnati, where she lost in the first round to Carla Suárez Navarro. In New Haven, she fell in the qualifying draw.

At the US Open, she reached the second round, where in what was her sixth loss to the Serb out of six matches, she lost to ninth seed Jelena Janković. In September, Pironkova played in Wuhan, where she lost in the qualifying draw. Her second tournament in September was the China Open, where she lost in the second round to world No. 1, Serena Williams. Next, she reached the quarterfinals in Linz, before losing to Karin Knapp. She reached her second quarterfinal of the month in Moscow, where she fell to eventual finalist Irina-Camelia Begu. Pironkova was awarded a wildcard for the final tournament of the year, the Tournament of Champions. She lost all her matches in the round-robin stage and finished fourth in her group.

=== 2015–2016: Roland Garros quarterfinal ===
Pironkova started the year ranked No. 50 and began the season at the Brisbane International where she lost her first-round match to seventh seed Suárez Navarro. Then she returned to Sydney as the defending champion and once again had to go through qualifying, as she was not given a wildcard entry. At the time, Pironkova was ranked No. 67 and lost the points from her title. She beat eighth seed Flavia Pennetta in the first round in straight sets, then overcoming unseeded Madison Keys and Záhlavová-Strýcová both in straight sets, but then lost in the semifinals to second seed and eventual champion Petra Kvitová in a repeat of the 2014 semifinals. With this defeat, she ended her 14-match winning streak at the tournament.

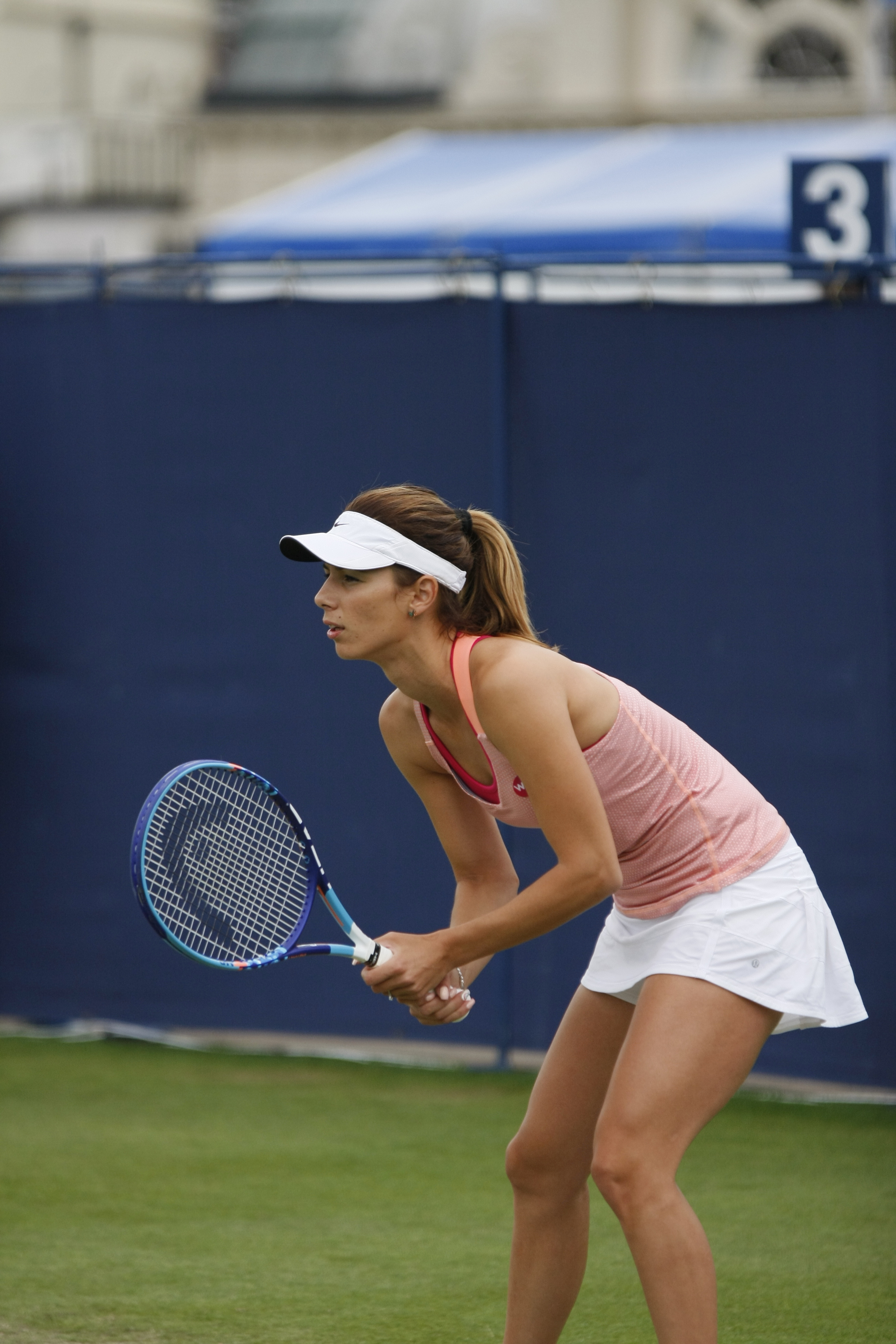
Pironkova at the 2015 Eastbourne International

At the Australian Open, she beat Heather Watson in the first round, but then in what was her eighth loss against the Slovak out of nine matches, lost to 11th seed Dominika Cibulková in the second, again in straight sets. Pironkova reached the third round of the Dubai Championships, where she beat Klára Koukalová and Peng Shuai, before losing to top seed world No. 2, Simona Halep, in straight sets. At Indian Wells, she lost in the first round, reached the second round in Miami, losing to 15th seed Flavia Pennetta in three tight sets. She reached second rounds in both Prague and Madrid, losing to top seeds Karolína Plíšková and Lucie Šafářová, respectively. She suffered a first-round defeat in Rome.

At the French Open, Pironkova reached the third round, where she upset 25th seed Barbora Strýcová and then took out another Czech player Denisa Allertová, both in straight sets, before losing to Sloane Stephens. The third-round appearance at the Roland Garros was her best to date.

Pironkova started her grass-court season at the Birmingham Classic, where in the first round she beat Brit Katie Stan, but came short against German fourth seed Angelique Kerber, losing in three sets. She then reached her second Premier-level event quarterfinal in 2015 at the Eastbourne International, where she beat Marina Erakovic in the first round, 16th seed Samantha Stosur, and former major finalist Dominika Cibulková, before being beaten by eventual finalist Agnieszka Radwańska. At Wimbledon, she lost to 30th seed and Eastbourne winner, Belinda Bencic, in three sets.

She then entered the İstanbul Cup as the eighth seed and reached her third quarterfinal of the year. She beat Margarita Gasparyan and Kurumi Nara, both in three sets, but lost to Urszula Radwańska in three sets in a tie-break in the final set.

Pironkova started the 2016 season with a loss to Samantha Crawford in Brisbane qualifying. She played the Sydney International, where she received a wildcard to the main draw and reached the second round, beating Lesia Tsurenko before losing to No. 8 seed, Belinda Bencic. At the Australian Open, she lost in the first round to Yaroslava Shvedova. Her next tournament was the Dubai Championships, where she entered the main draw after beating Kristýna Plíšková, Kateryna Bondarenko and Anna-Lena Friedsam in the qualifying. She lost to eventual finalist Barbora Strýcová in the first round.

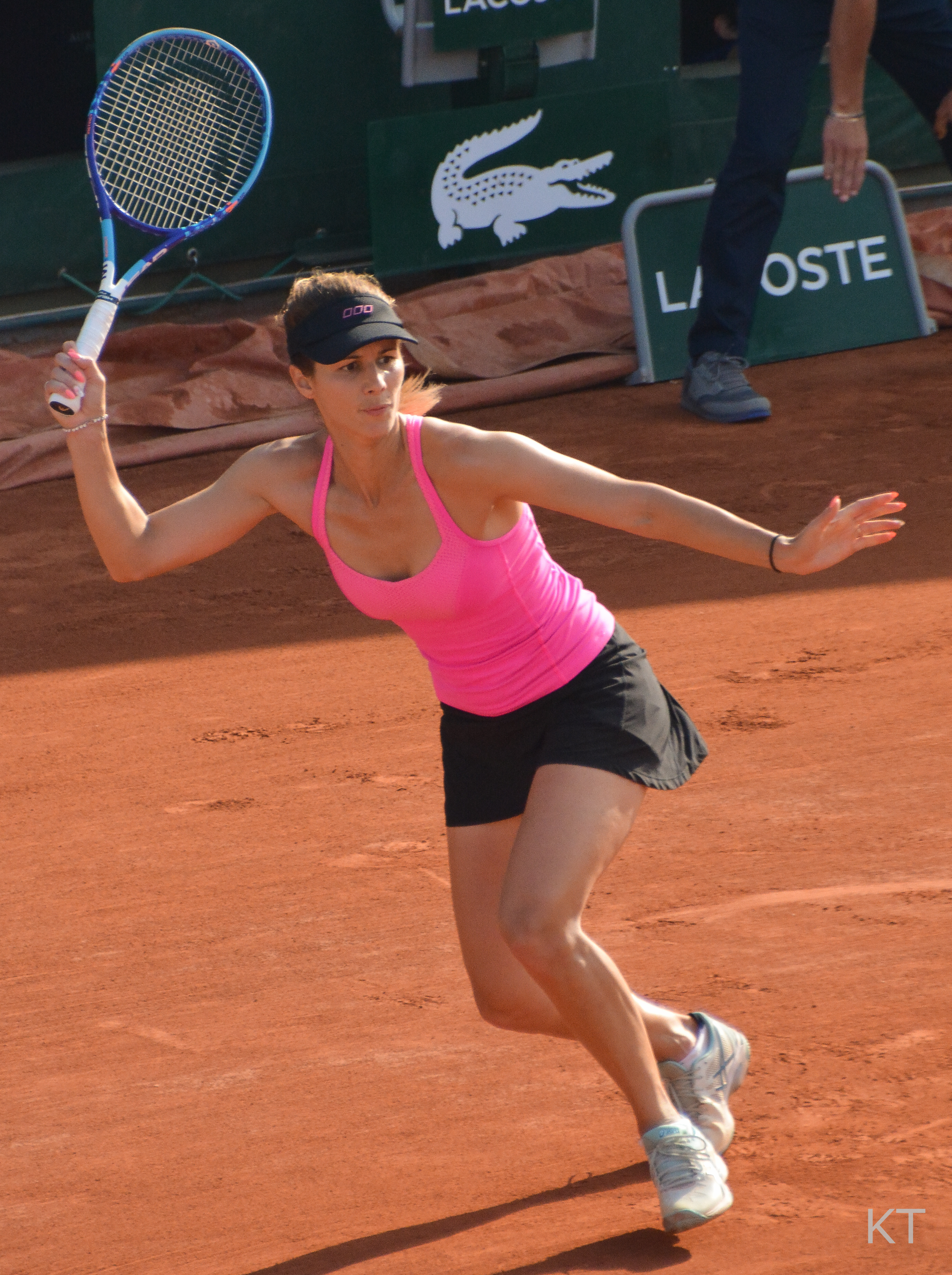
Pironkova reached the quarterfinals at the 2016 French Open, her best performance at the tournament

At Roland Garros, the 102nd ranked Pironkova upset 16th seed Sara Errani in the first round and 19th seed Sloane Stephens in the third round, both in straight sets. In the fourth round against world No. 2, Agnieszka Radwańska, after Pironkova was a set and three games down, the match was cancelled due to rain and resumed after two days. The Bulgarian took advantage of the situation, dominating the rest of the match after the pause by winning 12 out of 15 games, thus eventually reaching the quarterfinals and becoming the first Bulgarian since Sesil Karatantcheva in 2005 to reach this stage of the tournament. Pironkova's run at Roland Garros ended with a loss to Samantha Stosur.

In June, her good performance continued on grass court. She passed the qualifying event of Birmingham, and then, in the second round, the Bulgarian beat No. 26, Irina-Camelia Begu to reach the quarterfinals, where she was eliminated by Barbora Strýcová. Pironkova then exited the Wimbledon Championships in the first round, losing to seventh seed Belinda Bencic in two tight sets.

In August, she participated in the Summer Olympics. She lost in the opening round to Laura Siegemund, and next played the Cincinnati Open making her way to the second qualifying round by beating Kateryna Kozlova. She then lost to Annika Beck, but was allowed into the main draw as a lucky loser. She faced Daria Kasatkina overcoming her in straight sets. In the next round she lost to world No. 8, Roberta Vinci. Towards the end of the month, she lost in the first round of qualifying in New Haven in straight sets.

Pironkova reached the second round of the US Open but was beaten by Johanna Konta in three sets. She then lost in the first round of both tournaments that she played in after the US Open, and finished the year ranked 64th.

=== 2017–2019: Decline in ranking, shoulder injury, pregnancy hiatus ===
Her 2017 campaign began with a second-round appearance at the Shenzhen Open, where lost to the eighth seed and eventual finalist, Alison Riske, having beaten Galina Voskoboeva in her opening match. She next played in the qualifying rounds at the Sydney International. She defeated Patricia Maria Tig in the first round, only to retire in her next match against Maria Sakkari. Pironkova entered the Australian Open as the 64th ranked player, and lost in three sets against the third seeded Agnieszka Radwańska as her first round opponent. The tournament marked Pironkova's 45th consecutive Grand Slam appearance, the second longest active streak on the WTA Tour only behind Jelena Janković's 51. Pironkova's next tournament was the Qatar Ladies Open where she competed in the qualifying competition. She breezed through the first two rounds with straight set wins over Vania King and Evgeniya Rodina. However, in the final round of qualifying, she lost to former world No. 1, Jelena Janković, in three hard-fought sets.

After having lost six consecutive first-round matches, which included defeats in round of 128 at the Indian Wells Open and Miami Open and two losses in the qualifying rounds at the Italian Open and Madrid Open, Pironkova broke her losing streak with a straight-set victory over Mona Barthel in the first round of French Open. She was en route for another big upset having led with one set in the second round encounter against one of the tournament favourites Elina Svitolina, who was the No. 1 ranked player in the Race to Singapore standings, but eventually lost in three sets.

Pironkova began her grass-court season with a straight-set victory over tournament qualifier Tereza Martincová in the first round of the Nottingham Open. She next beat Kurumi Nara, also in straight sets, to reach the quarterfinals, where she lost to the fifth seed Lucie Šafářová, after having won the second set 6–0. She entered the qualifying round of the Eastbourne International, where she comfortably got better of the tenth seed Markéta Vondroušová in the opening round. Pironkova failed to reach the main draw as she suffered a tough three-set defeat in the final qualifying round, losing out to the third seed Lara Arruabarrena. However, she was awarded entry into the main draw as a lucky loser. Pironkova defeated Monica Niculescu in straight sets in her first match in the main draw, and then faced second seed Simona Halep in the next round. Pironkova won the first set in a tie-break and was leading 2–1 (40–30), when the match was suspended due to rain. When play resumed the next day, she went on to lose the match in three tight sets, in over 2 hours and 40 minutes.

Pironkova entered the Wimbledon Championships, drawing former world No. 5, Sara Errani, in the first round, a match that she eventually won comfortably in just over an hour, with the loss of just five games. Pironkova was dubbed as the darkhorse and one of the most dangerous unseeded players in draw by WTA insider David Kane prior to the tournament, and her potential second round encounter with former world No. 1, Caroline Wozniacki, was variously dubbed one of the most anticipated matches in the early rounds. With heavy strapping on her left thigh, Pironkova lost a closely contested two-set match against Wozniacki. The former played erratically, with both winners and unforced errors flowing from her racket incongruously.

Pironkova was sidelined from the US Open Series with a persistent shoulder injury. She was unable to participate at the US Open, and it marked the end of her run of 47 Grand Slam appearances in a row.

Pironkova missed the rest of the 2017 season and finished No. 162 in the world. In December, it was revealed, she was expecting her first child with her husband, and gave birth to a son in April 2018. For this reason, Pironkova did not participate in the 2018 and 2019 seasons as well.

=== 2020: Return to action, US Open quarterfinal ===
Pironkova announced her return to tennis in March, just before the COVID-19 pandemic. She returned to action at the 2020 US Open, playing her first tournament since the 2017 Wimbledon Championships using a protected ranking of No. 123 that she applied for prior to the birth of her son. Pironkova began her campaign with a straight-sets win over world No. 120, Ludmilla Samsonova in the first round. She then followed it up with wins over tenth seed Garbiñe Muguruza and 18th seed Donna Vekić in the second and third rounds, respectively. Playing in just her second round of 16 match in New York, Pironkova defeated Alizé Cornet in three hours. In the quarterfinals, she was defeated by Serena Williams, 4–6, 6–3, 6–2, despite leading by a break in the second set. 'USOpen.org' writer Steve Pratt highlighted Pironkova's run to the quarterfinals, noting how her successful return to tour after a three-year absence "[became] the story of the women's singles draw".

Pironkova received a wildcard for the 2020 French Open. In the first round, she defeated Andrea Petkovic in straight sets. Her opponent in the second round, Serena Williams, withdrew before the match. She was defeated by Barbora Krejčíková in the third round.

Due to her stellar performance at the US Open, reaching the quarterfinals at this major for the first time in her career, Pironkova was announced as the Bulgarian Sportsperson of the Year.

=== 2021: Drop in the rankings ===
After defeating Margarita Gasparyan in the third round of the Australian Open qualifying, she lost to eventual quarterfinalist Hsieh Su-wei.

At Wimbledon, she entered the main draw as lucky loser, losing to Yulia Putintseva in round one in straight sets.

At the US Open, she lost in the first round to 25th seed Daria Kasatkina and has not competed since then.

She finished the year ranked world No. 245.

== Playing style ==
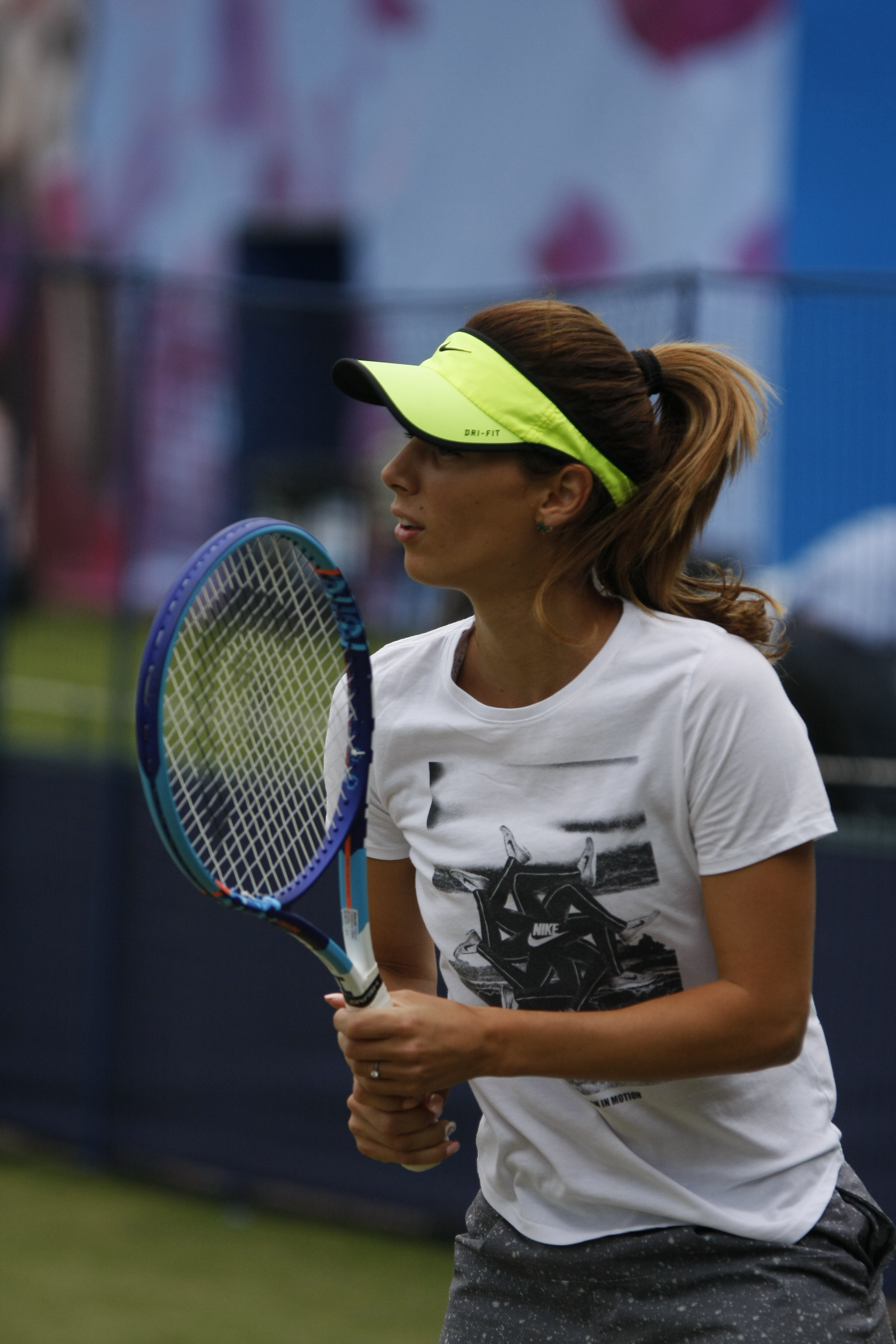
Pironkova prefers her backhand side for groundstrokes

Pironkova plays right-handed, and uses a double-handed backhand. She prefers fast surfaces, with grass being her favourite. Although she has a powerful first serve that consistently measures up to 180 kmph or 110 mph, she has a relatively weaker second serve. Pironkova is noted for her powerful backhand, with the down-the-line backhand being one of her best shots. Her forehand, however, has been variously described as "bizarre" and "clever", owing to the unusual amount of spin or slice on the shot. The Daily Telegraph commentator Emily Benammar noted in 2010 that if Pironkova's, "forehand comes up to scratch, she's in with a chance of beating the best".

Overall, Pironkova does not rely heavily upon her groundstrokes, but is instead noted for her stroke-play, variety of shots and intelligent use of the court and its geometry. She is also known for her squash-shot forehand and for incorporating flat and slice shots into rallies from her forehand and backhand sides. Pironkova varies the length of her shots and often draws her opponent forward with short balls to set up passing shots. She also makes her opponents move around the court by making use of deep cross-court groundstrokes to keep them off balance. Pironkova admittedly prefers shorter rallies, and looks for winners early in the point which at times leads to unforced errors. She told the freelance tennis writer Matt Trollope that she played mostly on clay courts early in her career and that the aggressive style developed "pretty naturally" during her formative years.

Pironkova's style of play has drawn comparisons with such players as Justine Henin. Sports columnist Simon Briggs elaborated on the similarity in the styles noting that Pironkova's court craft and tactical nous made her capable of "reflecting the Williams sisters' own power back against them". Pironkova has also been praised for her fast movement on the tennis court by such commentators as Briggs, who was impressed by her "nimble" footwork at the 2010 Wimbledon Championships. Pironkova thought of her movement on the grass courts as her best among all the surfaces. She also ascribed the optimum ball bounce on the grass as it is "probably just perfect for [my] timing". Having been praised for her range of shots and strokeplay, Pironkova said that she developed a spontaneous approach towards her shot selection and overall game as she matured.

== Honors ==
- Best progressing player of the year in Bulgaria – 2005
- Bulgarian Sportsperson of the Year – 2020

== Career statistics ==
=== Grand Slam tournament performance timelines ===
Key
W	F	SF	QF	#R	RR	Q#	DNQ	A	NH

(W) winner; (F) finalist; (SF) semifinalist; (QF) quarterfinalist; (#R) rounds 4, 3, 2, 1; (RR) round-robin stage; (Q#) qualification round; (DNQ) did not qualify; (A) absent; (NH) not held; (SR) strike rate (events won / competed); (W–L) win–loss record.
To avoid confusion and double counting, these charts are updated at the conclusion of a tournament or when the player's participation has ended.

==== Singles ====
Tournament	2005	2006	2007	2008	2009	2010	2011	2012	2013	2014	2015	2016	2017	...	2020	2021	SR	W–L	Win%
Australian Open	A	2R	1R	2R	2R	2R	2R	2R	1R	2R	2R	1R	1R		A	1R	0 / 13	8–13	38%
French Open	A	2R	1R	2R	1R	1R	2R	2R	1R	2R	3R	QF	2R		3R	Q2	0 / 13	13–13	50%
Wimbledon	Q3	2R	1R	1R	1R	SF	QF	2R	4R	1R	1R	1R	2R		NH	1R	0 / 13	15–13	54%
US Open	Q2	1R	2R	1R	1R	2R	2R	4R	1R	2R	1R	2R	A		QF	1R	0 / 13	12–13	48%
Win–loss	0–0	3–4	1–4	2–4	1–4	7–4	7–4	6–4	3–4	3–4	3–4	5–4	2–3		5–2	0–3	0 / 52	48–52	48%
Career statistics
Titles	0	0	0	0	0	0	0	0	0	1	0	0	0		0	0	Career total: 1		
Finals	0	0	0	0	0	0	0	0	0	1	0	0	0		0	0	Career total: 1		
Year-end ranking	88	62	98	46	99	35	46	42	108	39	59	64	162		135	245	$5,321,439		

==== Doubles ====
Tournament	2006	2007	2008	2009	2010	2011	2012	2013	2014	2015	SR	W–L	Win%
Australian Open	A	2R	A	2R	A	1R	A	A	A	A	0 / 3	2–3	40%
French Open	2R	A	2R	1R	A	1R	1R	A	A	1R	0 / 6	2–6	25%
Wimbledon	A	A	1R	A	A	2R	A	2R	2R	1R	0 / 5	3–5	38%
US Open	1R	A	2R	A	1R	1R	1R	A	A	A	0 / 5	1–5	17%
Win–loss	1–2	1–1	2–3	1–2	0–1	1–4	0–2	1–1	1–1	0–2	0 / 19	8–19	30%
