= 2011 Kremlin Cup =

- Date: 15–23 October
- Edition: 22nd (men) / 16th (women)
- Surface: Hard / indoor
- Location: Moscow, Russia
- Venue: Olympic Stadium

Champions

Men's singles
- (Serbia) Janko Tipsarević

Women's singles
- (Slovakia) Dominika Cibulková

Men's doubles
- (Czech Republic) František Čermák / (Slovakia) Filip Polášek

Women's doubles
- (United States) Vania King / (Kazakhstan) Yaroslava Shvedova
- Kremlin Cup

The 2011 Kremlin Cup was a tennis tournament played on indoor hard courts. It was the 22nd edition of the Kremlin Cup for the men (16th edition for the women) and was part of the ATP World Tour 250 Series of the 2011 ATP World Tour, and of the Premier Series of the 2011 WTA Tour. It was held at the Olympic Stadium in Moscow, Russia, from 15 October through 23 October 2011. Janko Tipsarević and Dominika Cibulková won the singles titles.

== Finals ==
=== Men's singles ===
(Serbia) Janko Tipsarević defeated (Serbia) Viktor Troicki, 6–4, 6–2

- It was Tipsarevic's 2nd title of the year and career.

=== Women's singles ===
(Slovakia) Dominika Cibulková defeated (Estonia) Kaia Kanepi, 3–6, 7–6^{(7–1)}, 7–5

- It was Cibulková's first career title.

=== Men's doubles ===
(Czech Republic) František Čermák / (Slovakia) Filip Polášek defeated (Argentina) Carlos Berlocq / (Spain) David Marrero, 6–3, 6–1

=== Women's doubles ===
(United States) Vania King / (Kazakhstan) Yaroslava Shvedova defeated (Australia) Anastasia Rodionova / (Kazakhstan) Galina Voskoboeva, 7–6^{(7–3)}, 6–3

== ATP entrants ==
=== Seeds ===
Country	Player	Rank^{1}	Seed
SRB	Janko Tipsarević	13	1
SRB	Viktor Troicki	16	2
UKR	Alexandr Dolgopolov	18	3
RUS	Nikolay Davydenko	37	4
USA	Alex Bogomolov Jr.	38	5
RUS	Dmitry Tursunov	41	6
LUX	Gilles Müller	42	7
ITA	Andreas Seppi	43	8

- Seeds are based on the rankings of October 10, 2011

=== Other entrants ===
The following players received wildcards into the singles main draw:

- (Russia) Evgeny Donskoy
- (Russia) Teymuraz Gabashvili
- (Russia) Andrey Kuznetsov

The following players have received the entry from the qualifying draw:

- (Germany) Michael Berrer
- (France) Jérémy Chardy
- (Russia) Konstantin Kravchuk
- (Serbia) Dušan Lajović

== WTA entrants ==
=== Seeds ===
Country	Player	Rank^{1}	Seed
RUS	Vera Zvonareva	5	1
POL	Agnieszka Radwańska	8	2
FRA	Marion Bartoli	11	3
ITA	Francesca Schiavone	12	4
SRB	Jelena Janković	13	5
RUS	Svetlana Kuznetsova	19	6
ITA	Roberta Vinci	22	7
SVK	Dominika Cibulková	23	8

- Seeds are based on the rankings of October 10, 2011

=== Other entrants ===
The following players received wildcards into the singles main draw:

- (Russia) Alla Kudryavtseva
- (Russia) Evgeniya Rodina
- (Italy) Francesca Schiavone

The following players received entry from the qualifying draw:

- (France) Alizé Cornet
- (Russia) Ekaterina Ivanova
- (Ukraine) Olga Savchuk
- (Kazakhstan) Galina Voskoboeva

The following players received entry from a lucky loser spot:

- (Spain) Arantxa Parra Santonja
