= 2016 Generali Ladies Linz – Singles =

Singles
- 2016 Generali Ladies Linz

Final
- Champion: (Slovakia) Dominika Cibulková
- Runner-up: (Switzerland) Viktorija Golubic
- Score: 6–3, 7–5

Details
- Draw: 32
- Seeds: 8

Events
Singles	Doubles
← 2015 ·	Linz Open	· 2017 →

Anastasia Pavlyuchenkova was the defending champion, but lost in the quarterfinals to Dominika Cibulková.

Cibulková went on to win the title, defeating Viktorija Golubic in the final, 6–3, 7–5.

== Seeds ==
1. (Spain) Garbiñe Muguruza (quarterfinals, retired)
2. (Slovakia) Dominika Cibulková (champion)
3. (United States) Madison Keys (semifinals, withdrew)
4. (Spain) Carla Suárez Navarro (semifinals)
5. (Russia) Anastasia Pavlyuchenkova (quarterfinals)
6. (Netherlands) Kiki Bertens (first round)
7. (Russia) Daria Kasatkina (first round)
8. (Germany) Laura Siegemund (first round)

== Draw ==
=== Key ===
- Q = Qualifier
- WC = Wild card
- LL = Lucky loser
- Alt = Alternate
- ITF = ITF entry
- PR = Protected ranking
- SR = Special ranking
- SE = Special exempt
- JE = Junior exempt
- JR = Junior Accelerator Programme entrant
- CO = College Accelerator Programme entrant
- NG = Next Gen Accelerator Program entrant
- w/o = Walkover
- r = Retired
- d = Defaulted

=== Finals ===
Semifinals
(Switzerland) Viktorija Golubic	w/o
3/WC	(United States) Madison Keys
4	(Spain) Carla Suárez Navarro	4	3
2/WC	(Slovakia) Dominika Cibulková	6	6

Final
(Switzerland) Viktorija Golubic	3	5
2/WC	(Slovakia) Dominika Cibulková	6	7

=== Top half ===
First round
1	(Spain) G Muguruza	6	6
(Turkey) Ç Büyükakçay	4	4
(United States) M Brengle	6	3	5
(Romania) M Niculescu	4	6	7
WC	(Austria) B Haas	4	4
(Germany) J Görges	6	6
(Switzerland) V Golubic	6	6
8	(Germany) L Siegemund	4	2
3/WC	(United States) M Keys	6	6
(Italy) C Giorgi	3	4
(Japan) M Doi	7	3	6
(Sweden) J Larsson	5	6	1
Q	(Czech Republic) Kr Plíšková	7^{7}	5	3
Q	(France) O Dodin	6^{2}	7	6
(Romania) S Cîrstea	6	6
6	(Netherlands) K Bertens	4	2

Second round
1	(Spain) G Muguruza	6	6
(Romania) M Niculescu	1	1
(Germany) J Görges	5	4
(Switzerland) V Golubic	7	6
3/WC	(United States) M Keys	6	6
(Japan) M Doi	2	0
Q	(France) O Dodin	6	6
(Romania) S Cîrstea	2	4

Quarterfinals
1	(Spain) G Muguruza	7	3	4^{r}
(Switzerland) V Golubic	5	6	4
3/WC	(United States) M Keys	6	6
Q	(France) O Dodin	3	3

Semifinals
(Switzerland) V Golubic	w/o
3/WC	(United States) M Keys

=== Bottom half ===
First round
7	(Russia) D Kasatkina	2	3
(Czech Republic) D Allertová	6	6
(Canada) E Bouchard	6^{5}	4
(Estonia) A Kontaveit	7^{7}	6
Q	(Spain) S Sorribes Tormo	7^{7}	6
(Latvia) J Ostapenko	6^{3}	4
(Germany) M Barthel	4	2
4	(Spain) C Suárez Navarro	6	6
5	(Russia) A Pavlyuchenkova	6	6
(Latvia) A Sevastova	4	1
(Belgium) K Flipkens	6	0
Q	(Luxembourg) M Minella	4	0^{r}
(Germany) A Beck	6	6
(Bulgaria) T Pironkova	0	4
WC	(Switzerland) B Bencic	1	2
2/WC	(Slovakia) D Cibulková	6	6

Second round
(Czech Republic) D Allertová	6	6
(Estonia) A Kontaveit	3	4
Q	(Spain) S Sorribes Tormo	4	1
4	(Spain) C Suárez Navarro	6	6
5	(Russia) A Pavlyuchenkova	6	7^{7}
(Belgium) K Flipkens	4	6^{2}
(Germany) A Beck	1	3
2/WC	(Slovakia) D Cibulková	6	6

Quarterfinals
(Czech Republic) D Allertová	4	6	2
4	(Spain) C Suárez Navarro	6	4	6
5	(Russia) A Pavlyuchenkova	6^{3}	4
2/WC	(Slovakia) D Cibulková	7^{7}	6

Semifinals
4	(Spain) C Suárez Navarro	4	3
2/WC	(Slovakia) D Cibulková	6	6

== Qualifying ==
=== Seeds ===
1. (Czech Republic) Kristýna Plíšková (qualified)
2. (United States) Lauren Davis (first round)
3. (Germany) Carina Witthöft (second round)
4. (France) Océane Dodin (qualified)
5. (Switzerland) Stefanie Vögele (qualifying competition)
6. (Luxembourg) Mandy Minella (qualified)
7. (Belgium) Alison Van Uytvanck (withdrew)
8. (Paraguay) Verónica Cepede Royg (first round)

=== Qualifiers ===
1. (Czech Republic) Kristýna Plíšková
2. (Luxembourg) Mandy Minella
3. (Spain) Sara Sorribes Tormo
4. (France) Océane Dodin

=== Draw ===
==== First qualifier ====
First round
1	(Czech Republic) Kristýna Plíšková	4	6	6
WC	(Austria) Julia Grabher	6	4	3
(Belgium) Elise Mertens	2	4
(Romania) Ana Bogdan	6	6
WC	(Austria) Mira Antonitsch	2	1
(Germany) Tamara Korpatsch	6	6
(Bulgaria) Viktoriya Tomova	6	7
Alt	(Slovakia) Michaela Hončová	2	5

Second round
1	(Czech Republic) Kristýna Plíšková	6	5	6
(Romania) Ana Bogdan	4	7	0
(Germany) Tamara Korpatsch	4	6	6
(Bulgaria) Viktoriya Tomova	6	4	2

Qualifying competition
1	(Czech Republic) Kristýna Plíšková	6	6
(Germany) Tamara Korpatsch	1	1

==== Second qualifier ====
First round
2	(United States) Lauren Davis	6	6^{6}	2
(Slovakia) Daniela Hantuchová	4	7^{8}	6
(Slovakia) Rebecca Šramková	2	7	2
(United States) Julia Boserup	6	5	6
WC	(United States) Caitlin Whoriskey	7	6^{4}	4
(Switzerland) Amra Sadiković	5	7^{7}	6
(Spain) Sílvia Soler Espinosa	4	4
6	(Luxembourg) Mandy Minella	6	6

Second round
(Slovakia) Daniela Hantuchová	4	6	6
(United States) Julia Boserup	6	4	3
(Switzerland) Amra Sadiković	6	5	0^{r}
6	(Luxembourg) Mandy Minella	4	7	3

Qualifying competition
(Slovakia) Daniela Hantuchová	3	7^{7}	4
6	(Luxembourg) Mandy Minella	6	6^{5}	6

==== Third qualifier ====
First round
3	(Germany) Carina Witthöft	7^{7}	7
(Bulgaria) Isabella Shinikova	6^{2}	5
(Netherlands) Richèl Hogenkamp	6	6^{6}	6
(Romania) Patricia Maria Țig	4	7^{8}	3
(Spain) Sara Sorribes Tormo	6	6
(Romania) Andreea Mitu	4	3
(Russia) Ekaterina Alexandrova	6	6
8	(Paraguay) Verónica Cepede Royg	2	2

Second round
3	(Germany) Carina Witthöft	4	6	4
(Netherlands) Richèl Hogenkamp	6	3	6
(Spain) Sara Sorribes Tormo	6	7^{8}
(Russia) Ekaterina Alexandrova	4	6^{6}

Qualifying competition
(Netherlands) Richèl Hogenkamp	2	0^{r}
(Spain) Sara Sorribes Tormo	6	0

==== Fourth qualifier ====
First round
4	(France) Océane Dodin	6	6
(Paraguay) Montserrat González	4	4
(Bulgaria) Elitsa Kostova	6	3	4
(Russia) Anna Kalinskaya	3	6	6
WC	(Switzerland) Patty Schnyder	6	6
(Russia) Marina Melnikova	3	2
(Slovakia) Anna Karolína Schmiedlová	2	2
5	(Switzerland) Stefanie Vögele	6	6

Second round
4	(France) Océane Dodin	6	7
(Russia) Anna Kalinskaya	3	5
WC	(Switzerland) Patty Schnyder	5	5
5	(Switzerland) Stefanie Vögele	7	7

Qualifying competition
4	(France) Océane Dodin	6	3	6
5	(Switzerland) Stefanie Vögele	4	6	3
