= 2015 Generali Ladies Linz – Singles =

Singles
- 2015 Generali Ladies Linz

Final
- Champion: (Russia) Anastasia Pavlyuchenkova
- Runner-up: (Germany) Anna-Lena Friedsam
- Score: 6–4, 6–3

Details
- Draw: 32
- Seeds: 8

Events
| Singles | Doubles |
| ← 2014 · | Linz Open | · 2016 → |

Karolína Plíšková was the defending champion, but she chose to compete in Tianjin instead.

Anastasia Pavlyuchenkova won the title, defeating Anna-Lena Friedsam in the final, 6–4, 6–3.

== Seeds ==
1. (Czech Republic) Lucie Šafářová (first round)
2. (Denmark) Caroline Wozniacki (second round)
3. (Italy) Roberta Vinci (first round)
4. (Germany) Andrea Petkovic (first round)
5. (Slovakia) Anna Karolína Schmiedlová (withdrew due to viral illness)
6. (Italy) Camila Giorgi (second round)
7. (Russia) Anastasia Pavlyuchenkova (champion)
8. (Czech Republic) Barbora Strýcová (second round)

== Draw ==
=== Key ===
- Q = Qualifier
- WC = Wild card
- LL = Lucky loser
- Alt = Alternate
- ITF = ITF entry
- PR = Protected ranking
- SR = Special ranking
- SE = Special exempt
- JE = Junior exempt
- JR = Junior Accelerator Programme entrant
- CO = College Accelerator Programme entrant
- NG = Next Gen Accelerator Program entrant
- w/o = Walkover
- r = Retired
- d = Defaulted

=== Finals ===
Semifinals
(Germany) Anna-Lena Friedsam | 6 | 4 | 7
(Sweden) Johanna Larsson | 3 | 6 | 5
7 | (Russia) Anastasia Pavlyuchenkova | 6 | 3 | 6
(Belgium) Kirsten Flipkens | 3 | 6 | 2

Final
(Germany) Anna-Lena Friedsam | 4 | 3
7 | (Russia) Anastasia Pavlyuchenkova | 6 | 6

=== Top half ===
First round
1/WC | (Czech Republic) L Šafářová | 3 | 4
(Romania) A Mitu | 6 | 6
(Slovakia) M Rybáriková | 3 | 3
(Germany) A-L Friedsam | 6 | 6
(Russia) M Gasparyan | 6 | 2 | 6
(Germany) C Witthöft | 3 | 6 | 3
(Germany) J Görges | 3 | 4
6 | (Italy) C Giorgi | 6 | 6
4/WC | (Germany) A Petkovic | 6 | 3 | 4
(Sweden) J Larsson | 3 | 6 | 6
(Czech Republic) L Hradecká | 2 | 5
(Belgium) A Van Uytvanck | 6 | 7
(United States) M Brengle | 6 | 6
(Japan) M Doi | 0 | 3
(Germany) A Beck | 1 | 3
LL | (United Kingdom) J Konta | 6 | 6

Second round
(Romania) A Mitu | 5 | 3
(Germany) A-L Friedsam | 7 | 6
(Russia) M Gasparyan | 6 | 2 | 6
6 | (Italy) C Giorgi | 3 | 6 | 3
(Sweden) J Larsson | 6 | 7^{7}
(Belgium) A Van Uytvanck | 4 | 6^{2}
(United States) M Brengle | 6 | 7
LL | (United Kingdom) J Konta | 3 | 5

Quarterfinals
(Germany) A-L Friedsam | 6 | 6
(Russia) M Gasparyan | 3 | 4
(Sweden) J Larsson | 7 | 7^{8}
(United States) M Brengle | 5 | 6^{6}

Semifinals
(Germany) A-L Friedsam | 6 | 4 | 7
(Sweden) J Larsson | 3 | 6 | 5

=== Bottom half ===
First round
7 | (Russia) A Pavlyuchenkova | 7^{7} | 6
(Czech Republic) K Siniaková | 6^{4} | 0
Q | (Switzerland) S Vögele | 6 | 7
WC | (Austria) T Paszek | 4 | 5
(Germany) M Barthel | 7 | 3 | 6
Q | (Netherlands) K Bertens | 5 | 6 | 2
Q | (Serbia) A Krunić | 6 | 6^{3} | 6
3 | (Italy) R Vinci | 1 | 7^{7} | 1
8 | (Czech Republic) B Strýcová | 6 | 6^{5} | 6
WC | (Austria) B Haas | 0 | 7^{7} | 4
Q | (Czech Republic) K Koukalová | 2 | 6 | 1
(Czech Republic) D Allertová | 6 | 4 | 6
(Belgium) K Flipkens | 6 | 7^{7}
(United States) V Lepchenko | 3 | 6^{3}
(Croatia) M Lučić-Baroni | 6 | 6^{3} | 4
2 | (Denmark) C Wozniacki | 3 | 7^{7} | 6

Second round
7 | (Russia) A Pavlyuchenkova | 6 | 6
Q | (Switzerland) S Vögele | 4 | 0
(Germany) M Barthel | 6^{6} | 3
Q | (Serbia) A Krunić | 7^{8} | 6
8 | (Czech Republic) B Strýcová | 6^{0} | 7 | 4
(Czech Republic) D Allertová | 7^{7} | 5 | 6
(Belgium) K Flipkens | 6 | 6
2 | (Denmark) C Wozniacki | 4 | 4

Quarterfinals
7 | (Russia) A Pavlyuchenkova | 6 | 6
Q | (Serbia) A Krunić | 3 | 3
(Czech Republic) D Allertová | 3 | 4
(Belgium) K Flipkens | 6 | 6

Semifinals
7 | (Russia) A Pavlyuchenkova | 6 | 3 | 6
(Belgium) K Flipkens | 3 | 6 | 2

== Qualifying ==
=== Seeds ===
1. (United Kingdom) Johanna Konta (qualifying competition, lucky loser)
2. (Belgium) Yanina Wickmayer (first round)
3. (Colombia) Mariana Duque Mariño (second round)
4. (Latvia) Jeļena Ostapenko (qualifying competition)
5. (Czech Republic) Tereza Smitková (first round)
6. (Netherlands) Kiki Bertens (qualified)
7. (Serbia) Aleksandra Krunić (qualified)
8. (Czech Republic) Klára Koukalová (qualified)

=== Qualifiers ===
1. (Czech Republic) Klára Koukalová
2. (Netherlands) Kiki Bertens
3. (Serbia) Aleksandra Krunić
4. (Switzerland) Stefanie Vögele

=== Lucky loser ===
1. (United Kingdom) Johanna Konta

=== Draw ===
==== First qualifier ====
First round
1 | (United Kingdom) Johanna Konta | 6 | 6^{4} | 6
(United States) Anna Tatishvili | 4 | 7^{7} | 3
WC | (Austria) Julia Grabher | 3 | 1
(France) Julie Coin | 6 | 6
(Russia) Daria Kasatkina | 6 | 6
(United States) Louisa Chirico | 2 | 4
WC | (Austria) Melanie Klaffner | 5 | 4
8 | (Czech Republic) Klára Koukalová | 7 | 6

Second round
1 | (United Kingdom) Johanna Konta | 6 | 6
(France) Julie Coin | 4 | 2
(Russia) Daria Kasatkina | 6^{3} | 1
8 | (Czech Republic) Klára Koukalová | 7^{7} | 6

Qualifying competition
1 | (United Kingdom) Johanna Konta | 2 | 6 | 4
8 | (Czech Republic) Klára Koukalová | 6 | 2 | 6

==== Second qualifier ====
First round
2 | (Belgium) Yanina Wickmayer | 5 | 6 | 3
(Slovakia) Jana Čepelová | 7 | 0 | 6
(United Kingdom) Naomi Broady | 2 | 6 | 4
(Bulgaria) Sesil Karatantcheva | 6 | 4 | 6
(Poland) Paula Kania | 6 | 7^{7}
(France) Océane Dodin | 3 | 6^{5}
WC | (Austria) Mira Antonitsch | 6 | 3 | 3
6 | (Netherlands) Kiki Bertens | 2 | 6 | 6

Second round
(Slovakia) Jana Čepelová | 2 | 6 | 4
(Bulgaria) Sesil Karatantcheva | 6 | 4 | 6
(Poland) Paula Kania | 6^{6} | 3
6 | (Netherlands) Kiki Bertens | 7^{8} | 6

Qualifying competition
(Bulgaria) Sesil Karatantcheva | 2 | 7 | 4
6 | (Netherlands) Kiki Bertens | 6 | 5 | 6

==== Third qualifier ====
First round
3 | (Colombia) Mariana Duque Mariño | 6 | 7^{7}
(Netherlands) Richèl Hogenkamp | 2 | 6^{4}
(Estonia) Kaia Kanepi | 6 | 6
(Liechtenstein) Stephanie Vogt | 4 | 1
WC | (Austria) Patricia Mayr-Achleitner | 3 | 2
(France) Amandine Hesse | 6 | 6
(Latvia) Anastasija Sevastova | 3 | 3
7 | (Serbia) Aleksandra Krunić | 6 | 6

Second round
3 | (Colombia) Mariana Duque Mariño | 2 | 3
(Estonia) Kaia Kanepi | 6 | 6
(France) Amandine Hesse | 0 | 2
7 | (Serbia) Aleksandra Krunić | 6 | 6

Qualifying competition
(Estonia) Kaia Kanepi | 3 | 2
7 | (Serbia) Aleksandra Krunić | 6 | 6

==== Fourth qualifier ====
First round
4 | (Latvia) Jeļena Ostapenko | 6 | 6
(Ukraine) Maryna Zanevska | 3 | 1
(Spain) Sílvia Soler Espinosa | 4 | 1
(Russia) Alexandra Panova | 6 | 6
(Croatia) Donna Vekić | 4 | 6 | 6
(United States) Shelby Rogers | 6 | 4 | 2
(Switzerland) Stefanie Vögele | 6 | 6
5 | (Czech Republic) Tereza Smitková | 3 | 4

Second round
4 | (Latvia) Jeļena Ostapenko | 6 | 6
(Russia) Alexandra Panova | 2 | 1
(Croatia) Donna Vekić | 3 | 4
(Switzerland) Stefanie Vögele | 6 | 6

Qualifying competition
4 | (Latvia) Jeļena Ostapenko | 3 | 6^{1}
(Switzerland) Stefanie Vögele | 6 | 7^{7}
