= 2015 Generali Ladies Linz – Doubles =

Doubles
- 2015 Generali Ladies Linz

Final
- Champions: (United States) Raquel Kops-Jones (United States) Abigail Spears
- Runners-up: (Czech Republic) Andrea Hlaváčková (Czech Republic) Lucie Hradecká
- Score: 6–3, 7–5

Details
- Draw: 16
- Seeds: 4

Events
Singles	Doubles
← 2014 ·	Linz Open	· 2016 →

Raluca Olaru and Anna Tatishvili were the defending champions, but lost to Andrea Hlaváčková and Lucie Hradecká in the first round.
Raquel Kops-Jones and Abigail Spears won the title, defeating Hlaváčková and Hradecká in the final, 6–3, 7–5.

== Seeds ==
1. (United States) Raquel Kops-Jones / (United States) Abigail Spears (champions)
2. (Czech Republic) Andrea Hlaváčková / (Czech Republic) Lucie Hradecká (final)
3. (Spain) Anabel Medina Garrigues / (Spain) Arantxa Parra Santonja (first round)
4. (Germany) Julia Görges / (Sweden) Johanna Larsson (quarterfinals)

== Draw ==
=== Key ===
- Q = Qualifier
- WC = Wild card
- LL = Lucky loser
- Alt = Alternate
- ITF = ITF entry
- PR = Protected ranking
- SR = Special ranking
- SE = Special exempt
- JE = Junior exempt
- JR = Junior Accelerator Programme entrant
- CO = College Accelerator Programme entrant
- NG = Next Gen Accelerator Program entrant
- w/o = Walkover
- r = Retired
- d = Defaulted

First round
1	(United States) R Kops-Jones (United States) A Spears	6	3	[10]
(Germany) A-L Grönefeld (Poland) A Rosolska	3	6	[7]
WC	(Austria) S Klemenschits (Germany) C Witthöft	2	2
(United Kingdom) N Broady (United Kingdom) J Konta	6	6
3	(Spain) A Medina Garrigues (Spain) A Parra Santonja	1	4
(Argentina) M Irigoyen (Poland) P Kania	6	6
(Belgium) K Flipkens (Czech Republic) B Strýcová	6	7
(France) A Hesse (Ukraine) A Vasylyeva	4	5
(Russia) V Solovyeva (Liechtenstein) S Vogt	6	6
(Colombia) M Duque Mariño (Spain) S Soler Espinosa	3	3
(United States) M Brengle (Romania) A Mitu	2	6^{5}
4	(Germany) J Görges (Sweden) J Larsson	6	7^{7}
WC	(Germany) A Beck (Austria) T Paszek	0	7	[5]
(Georgia (country)) O Kalashnikova (Georgia (country)) S Shapatava	6	5	[10]
(Romania) R Olaru (United States) A Tatishvili	0	6^{4}
2	(Czech Republic) A Hlaváčková (Czech Republic) L Hradecká	6	7^{7}

Quarterfinals
1	(United States) R Kops-Jones (United States) A Spears	5	6	[10]
(United Kingdom) N Broady (United Kingdom) J Konta	7	1	[8]
(Argentina) M Irigoyen (Poland) P Kania	w/o
(Belgium) K Flipkens (Czech Republic) B Strýcová
(Russia) V Solovyeva (Liechtenstein) S Vogt	4	7^{7}	[10]
4	(Germany) J Görges (Sweden) J Larsson	6	6^{4}	[5]
(Georgia (country)) O Kalashnikova (Georgia (country)) S Shapatava	1	2
2	(Czech Republic) A Hlaváčková (Czech Republic) L Hradecká	6	6

Semifinals
1	(United States) R Kops-Jones (United States) A Spears	6	7
(Argentina) M Irigoyen (Poland) P Kania	4	5
(Russia) V Solovyeva (Liechtenstein) S Vogt	4	6	[3]
2	(Czech Republic) A Hlaváčková (Czech Republic) L Hradecká	6	2	[10]

Final
1	(United States) R Kops-Jones (United States) A Spears	6	7
2	(Czech Republic) A Hlaváčková (Czech Republic) L Hradecká	3	5
