= 2014 Generali Ladies Linz – Singles =

Singles
- 2014 Generali Ladies Linz

Final
- Champion: (Czech Republic) Karolína Plíšková
- Runner-up: (Italy) Camila Giorgi
- Score: 6–7^{(4–7)}, 6–3, 7–6^{(7–4)}

Details
- Draw: 32
- Seeds: 8

Events
Singles	Doubles
← 2013 ·	Linz Open	· 2015 →

Angelique Kerber was the defending champion, but she chose not to participate this year.

Karolína Plíšková won the title, defeating Camila Giorgi in the final, 6–7^{(4–7)}, 6–3, 7–6^{(7–4)}, despite being a championship match point down in the third set.

== Seeds ==
1. (Canada) Eugenie Bouchard (second round; withdrew due to a left thigh injury)
2. (Serbia) Ana Ivanovic (second round; withdrew due to a hip injury)
3. (Slovakia) Dominika Cibulková (first round)
4. (Germany) Andrea Petkovic (first round)
5. (Germany) Sabine Lisicki (first round)
6. (Czech Republic) Barbora Záhlavová-Strýcová (first round)
7. (Czech Republic) Karolína Plíšková (champion)
8. (France) Caroline Garcia (first round)

== Draw ==
=== Key ===
- Q = Qualifier
- WC = Wild card
- LL = Lucky loser
- Alt = Alternate
- ITF = ITF entry
- PR = Protected ranking
- SR = Special ranking
- SE = Special exempt
- JE = Junior exempt
- JR = Junior Accelerator Programme entrant
- CO = College Accelerator Programme entrant
- NG = Next Gen Accelerator Program entrant
- w/o = Walkover
- r = Retired
- d = Defaulted

=== Finals ===
Semifinals
(Italy) Karin Knapp	4	2
(Italy) Camila Giorgi	6	6
Q	(Germany) Anna-Lena Friedsam	6	3	3
7	(Czech Republic) Karolína Plíšková	2	6	6

Final
(Italy) Camila Giorgi	7^{7}	3	6^{4}
7	(Czech Republic) Karolína Plíšková	6^{4}	6	7^{7}

=== Top half ===
First round
1	(Canada) E Bouchard	6	6
WC	(Austria) P Mayr-Achleitner	4	1
WC	(Austria) L-M Moser	2	3
(Bulgaria) T Pironkova	6	6
(Slovakia) M Rybáriková	6	5	6
(Estonia) K Kanepi	4	7	2
(Italy) K Knapp	7	2	7^{7}
5/WC	(Germany) S Lisicki	5	6	6^{1}
4	(Germany) A Petkovic	1	2
(Italy) C Giorgi	6	6
(Croatia) D Vekić	5	1
Q	(Tunisia) O Jabeur	7	6
Q	(Czech Republic) K Siniaková	5	6	6^{3}
(Czech Republic) K Koukalová	7	3	7^{7}
(New Zealand) M Erakovic	6	4	6
8	(France) C Garcia	2	6	4

Second round
1	(Canada) E Bouchard
(Bulgaria) T Pironkova	w/o
(Slovakia) M Rybáriková	3	0^{r}
(Italy) K Knapp	6	0
(Italy) C Giorgi	6	6
Q	(Tunisia) O Jabeur	3	2
(Czech Republic) K Koukalová	0	2
(New Zealand) M Erakovic	6	6

Quarterfinals
(Bulgaria) T Pironkova	4	6	4
(Italy) K Knapp	6	4	6
(Italy) C Giorgi	6	7
(New Zealand) M Erakovic	3	5

Semifinals
(Italy) K Knapp	4	2
(Italy) C Giorgi	6	6

=== Bottom half ===
First round
6	(Czech Republic) B Záhlavová-Strýcová	6^{4}	5
(Switzerland) S Vögele	7^{7}	7
(Germany) A Beck	6^{6}	4
(Slovakia) A Schmiedlová	7^{8}	6
(Switzerland) T Bacsinszky	6^{1}	6	4
(Slovakia) J Čepelová	7^{7}	1	6
Q	(Germany) A-L Friedsam	2	6	6
3	(Slovakia) D Cibulková	6	3	4
7	(Czech Republic) Ka Plíšková	6	6
(Belgium) K Flipkens	2	4
LL	(Netherlands) K Bertens	3	1
(Germany) M Barthel	6	6
(Romania) I-C Begu	5	1^{r}
Q	(United States) M Brengle	7	3
(France) P Parmentier	3	2
2	(Serbia) A Ivanovic	6	6

Second round
(Switzerland) S Vögele	2	6	6
(Slovakia) A Schmiedlová	6	1	4
(Slovakia) J Čepelová	0	4
Q	(Germany) A-L Friedsam	6	6
7	(Czech Republic) Ka Plíšková	6	6
(Germany) M Barthel	4	2
Q	(United States) M Brengle	w/o
2	(Serbia) A Ivanovic

Quarterfinals
(Switzerland) S Vögele	6	2	3
Q	(Germany) A-L Friedsam	4	6	6
7	(Czech Republic) Ka Plíšková	6	6
Q	(United States) M Brengle	4	4

Semifinals
Q	(Germany) A-L Friedsam	6	3	3
7	(Czech Republic) Ka Plíšková	2	6	6

== Qualifying ==
=== Seeds ===
1. (Romania) Monica Niculescu (first round)
2. (Slovenia) Polona Hercog (first round)
3. (Netherlands) Kiki Bertens (qualifying competition; Lucky loser)
4. (Czech Republic) Tereza Smitková (qualifying competition)
5. (Sweden) Johanna Larsson (second round)
6. (Germany) Anna-Lena Friedsam (qualified)
7. (Czech Republic) Kristýna Plíšková (second round)
8. (Belarus) Aliaksandra Sasnovich (qualifying competition)

=== Qualifiers ===
1. (Germany) Anna-Lena Friedsam
2. (United States) Madison Brengle
3. (Tunisia) Ons Jabeur
4. (Czech Republic) Kateřina Siniaková

=== Lucky loser ===
1. (Netherlands) Kiki Bertens

=== Draw ===
==== First qualifier ====
First round
1	(Romania) Monica Niculescu	3	6	4
(Russia) Alexandra Panova	6	3	6
(Luxembourg) Mandy Minella	5	7	3
(Serbia) Aleksandra Krunić	7	5	0^{r}
(Netherlands) Richèl Hogenkamp	6^{4}	6^{2}
(Slovakia) Kristína Kučová	7^{7}	7^{7}
(Germany) Dinah Pfizenmaier	1	0
6	(Germany) Anna-Lena Friedsam	6	6

Second round
(Russia) Alexandra Panova	7^{7}	6
(Luxembourg) Mandy Minella	6^{0}	4
(Slovakia) Kristína Kučová	5	0
6	(Germany) Anna-Lena Friedsam	7	6

Qualifying competition
(Russia) Alexandra Panova	6	4	2
6	(Germany) Anna-Lena Friedsam	4	6	6

==== Second qualifier ====
First round
2	(Slovenia) Polona Hercog	3	6	6^{9}
(Czech Republic) Lucie Hradecká	6	4	7^{11}
(United States) Madison Brengle	6	6
Alt	(Italy) Gioia Barbieri	2	3
(Czech Republic) Denisa Allertová	4	4
(Germany) Carina Witthöft	6	6
(Poland) Paula Kania	3	4
8	(Belarus) Aliaksandra Sasnovich	6	6

Second round
(Czech Republic) Lucie Hradecká	6^{3}	7^{7}	3
(United States) Madison Brengle	7^{7}	6^{4}	6
(Germany) Carina Witthöft	1	4
8	(Belarus) Aliaksandra Sasnovich	6	6

Qualifying competition
(United States) Madison Brengle	4	6	6
8	(Belarus) Aliaksandra Sasnovich	6	4	2

==== Third qualifier ====
First round
3	(Netherlands) Kiki Bertens	5	6	7
(Austria) Tamira Paszek	7	2	5
(Poland) Katarzyna Piter	6	6
WC	(Austria) Julia Grabher	2	2
(Tunisia) Ons Jabeur	6	6
WC	(Germany) Antonia Lottner	4	4
WC	(Austria) Anna Maria Heil	2	3
7	(Czech Republic) Kristýna Plíšková	6	6

Second round
3	(Netherlands) Kiki Bertens	6	6
(Poland) Katarzyna Piter	1	3
(Tunisia) Ons Jabeur	6	6
7	(Czech Republic) Kristýna Plíšková	2	2

Qualifying competition
3	(Netherlands) Kiki Bertens	3	3
(Tunisia) Ons Jabeur	6	6

==== Fourth qualifier ====
First round
4	(Czech Republic) Tereza Smitková	6	5	6
(United States) Anna Tatishvili	2	7	0
WC	(Austria) Pia König	4	5
(Sweden) Sofia Arvidsson	6	7
(Ukraine) Maryna Zanevska	6^{10}	7	3
(Czech Republic) Kateřina Siniaková	7^{12}	5	6
(United Kingdom) Naomi Broady	4	5
5	(Sweden) Johanna Larsson	6	7

Second round
4	(Czech Republic) Tereza Smitková	6	6
(Sweden) Sofia Arvidsson	3	4
(Czech Republic) Kateřina Siniaková	6	6
5	(Sweden) Johanna Larsson	4	4

Qualifying competition
4	(Czech Republic) Tereza Smitková	7	5	1
(Czech Republic) Kateřina Siniaková	5	7	6
