= 2016 Generali Ladies Linz =

Indoor tennis tournament in Austria

- Date: 10–16 October
- Edition: 30th
- Category: WTA International
- Draw: 32S / 16D
- Prize money: $250,000
- Surface: Hard (indoor)
- Location: Linz, Austria
- Venue: TipsArena Linz

Champions

Singles
- (Slovakia) Dominika Cibulková

Doubles
- (Netherlands) Kiki Bertens / (Sweden) Johanna Larsson
← 2015 ·	Generali Ladies Linz	· 2017 →

The 2016 Generali Ladies Linz was a women's tennis tournament played on indoor hard courts. It was the 30th edition of the Generali Ladies Linz, and part of the WTA International tournaments-category of the 2016 WTA Tour. It was held at the TipsArena Linz in Linz, Austria, on 10 October until 16 October 2016. Second-seeded Dominika Cibulková won the singles title.

== Finals ==
=== Singles ===
- (Slovakia) Dominika Cibulková defeated (Switzerland) Viktorija Golubic 6–3, 7–5

=== Doubles ===
- (Netherlands) Kiki Bertens / (Sweden) Johanna Larsson defeated (Germany) Anna-Lena Grönefeld / (Czech Republic) Květa Peschke 4–6, 6–2, [10–7]

== Points and prize money ==
=== Point distribution ===
Event	W	F	SF	QF	Round of 16	Round of 32	Q	Q2	Q1
Singles	280	180	110	60	30	1	18	12	1
Doubles	280	180	110	60	1	—	—	—	—

=== Prize money ===
Event	W	F	SF	QF	Round of 16	Round of 32^{1}	Q2	Q1
Singles	$43,000	$21,400	$11,500	$6,200	$3,420	$2,220	$1,285	$750
Doubles *	$12,300	$6,400	$3,435	$1,820	$960	—	—	—

_{^{1} Qualifiers prize money is also the Round of 32 prize money}
_{* per team}

== Singles entrants ==
=== Seeds ===
Country	Player	Rank^{1}	Seed
ESP	Garbiñe Muguruza	4	1
SVK	Dominika Cibulková	8	2
USA	Madison Keys	9	3
ESP	Carla Suárez Navarro	10	4
RUS	Anastasia Pavlyuchenkova	17	5
NED	Kiki Bertens	23	6
RUS	Daria Kasatkina	24	7
GER	Laura Siegemund	29	8

- Rankings as of October 3, 2016

=== Other entrants ===
The following players received wildcards into the singles main draw:

- (Switzerland) Belinda Bencic
- (Slovakia) Dominika Cibulková
- (Austria) Barbara Haas
- (United States) Madison Keys

The following players received entry from the qualifying draw:

- (France) Océane Dodin
- (Luxembourg) Mandy Minella
- (Czech Republic) Kristýna Plíšková
- (Spain) Sara Sorribes Tormo

=== Withdrawals ===
Before the tournament

- (Italy) Sara Errani → replaced by (Germany) Mona Barthel
- (Germany) Anna-Lena Friedsam → replaced by (Estonia) Anett Kontaveit
- (Czech Republic) Karolína Plíšková → replaced by (Spain) Garbiñe Muguruza
- (Czech Republic) Barbora Strýcová → replaced by (Czech Republic) Denisa Allertová

During the tournament

- (United States) Madison Keys

=== Retirements ===
- (Luxembourg) Mandy Minella
- (Spain) Garbiñe Muguruza

== Doubles entrants ==
=== Seeds ===
Country	Player	Country	Player	Rank^{1}	Seed
USA	Raquel Atawo	USA	Abigail Spears	38	1
NED	Kiki Bertens	SWE	Johanna Larsson	83	2
GER	Anna-Lena Grönefeld	CZE	Květa Peschke	95	3
NED	Demi Schuurs	CZE	Renata Voráčová	145	4

- ^{1} Rankings as of October 3, 2016

=== Other entrants ===
The following pairs received wildcards into the doubles main draw:

- (Romania) Ana Bogdan / (Austria) Barbara Haas
- (Austria) Sandra Klemenschits / (Switzerland) Patty Schnyder
