= 2014 Generali Ladies Linz – Doubles =

Doubles
- 2014 Generali Ladies Linz

Final
- Champions: (Romania) Raluca Olaru (United States) Anna Tatishvili
- Runners-up: (Germany) Annika Beck (France) Caroline Garcia
- Score: 6–2, 6–1

Details
- Draw: 16
- Seeds: 4

Events
Singles	Doubles
← 2013 ·	Linz Open	· 2015 →

Karolína Plíšková and Kristýna Plíšková were the defending champions, but lost in the first round to Annika Beck and Caroline Garcia.
Raluca Olaru and Anna Tatishvili won the title, defeating Beck and Garcia in the final, 6–2, 6–1.

== Seeds ==
1. (Czech Republic) Lucie Hradecká / (Czech Republic) Barbora Záhlavová-Strýcová (quarterfinals)
2. (New Zealand) Marina Erakovic / (Spain) Anabel Medina Garrigues (semifinals)
3. (Czech Republic) Karolína Plíšková / (Czech Republic) Kristýna Plíšková (first round)
4. (Canada) Gabriela Dabrowski / (Poland) Alicja Rosolska (semifinals)

== Draw ==
=== Key ===
- Q = Qualifier
- WC = Wild card
- LL = Lucky loser
- Alt = Alternate
- ITF = ITF entry
- PR = Protected ranking
- SR = Special ranking
- SE = Special exempt
- JE = Junior exempt
- JR = Junior Accelerator Programme entrant
- CO = College Accelerator Programme entrant
- NG = Next Gen Accelerator Program entrant
- w/o = Walkover
- r = Retired
- d = Defaulted

=== Draw ===
First round
1	(Czech Republic) L Hradecká (Czech Republic) B Záhlavová-Strýcová	6	6
(United Kingdom) J Rae (United Kingdom) A Smith	3	2
(Ukraine) Y Beygelzimer (Czech Republic) E Hrdinová	5	7^{7}	[7]
(Romania) R Olaru (United States) A Tatishvili	7	6^{4}	[10]
4	(Canada) G Dabrowski (Poland) A Rosolska	7^{7}	3	[11]
WC	(Austria) B Haas (Austria) P Mayr-Achleitner	6^{0}	6	[9]
WC	(Austria) S Klemenschits (Austria) T Paszek	1	2
(Poland) K Piter (Ukraine) M Zanevska	6	6
(Romania) I-C Begu (Italy) K Knapp	2	2
(Germany) M Barthel (Luxembourg) M Minella	6	6
(Germany) A Beck (France) C Garcia	7^{7}	6
3	(Czech Republic) Ka Plíšková (Czech Republic) Kr Plíšková	6^{2}	2
(Germany) K Barrois (France) L Thorpe	5	4
(Poland) P Kania (Russia) V Solovyeva	7	6
(United States) N Melichar (Liechtenstein) S Vogt	1	2
2	(New Zealand) M Erakovic (Spain) A Medina Garrigues	6	6

Quarterfinals
1	(Czech Republic) L Hradecká (Czech Republic) B Záhlavová-Strýcová	3	6	[6]
(Romania) R Olaru (United States) A Tatishvili	6	4	[10]
4	(Canada) G Dabrowski (Poland) A Rosolska	6	6
(Poland) K Piter (Ukraine) M Zanevska	4	3
(Germany) M Barthel (Luxembourg) M Minella	6	3	[8]
(Germany) A Beck (France) C Garcia	4	6	[10]
(Poland) P Kania (Russia) V Solovyeva	4	6	[3]
2	(New Zealand) M Erakovic (Spain) A Medina Garrigues	6	4	[10]

Semifinals
(Romania) R Olaru (United States) A Tatishvili	4	7^{7}	[10]
4	(Canada) G Dabrowski (Poland) A Rosolska	6	6^{3}	[6]
(Germany) A Beck (France) C Garcia	6	6
2	(New Zealand) M Erakovic (Spain) A Medina Garrigues	2	3

Final
(Romania) R Olaru (United States) A Tatishvili	6	6
(Germany) A Beck (France) C Garcia	2	1
