= 2014 Generali Ladies Linz =

- Date: 6–12 October
- Edition: 28th
- Category: WTA International
- Prize money: $250,000
- Surface: Hard (indoor)
- Location: Linz, Austria
- Venue: TipsArena Linz

Champions

Singles
- (Czech Republic) Karolína Plíšková

Doubles
- (Romania) Raluca Olaru / (United States) Anna Tatishvili
← 2013 ·	Generali Ladies Linz	· 2015 →

The 2014 Generali Ladies Linz was a women's tennis tournament played on indoor hard courts. It was the 28th edition of the Generali Ladies Linz, and part of the WTA International tournaments-category of the 2014 WTA Tour. It was held at the TipsArena Linz in Linz, Austria, from 6 October until 12 October 2014. Seventh-seeded Karolína Plíšková won the singles title.

== Finals ==
=== Singles ===
- (Czech Republic) Karolína Plíšková defeated (Italy) Camila Giorgi, 6–7^{(4–7)}, 6–3, 7–6^{(7–4)}

=== Doubles ===
- (Romania) Raluca Olaru / (United States) Anna Tatishvili defeated (Germany) Annika Beck / (France) Caroline Garcia, 6–2, 6–1

== Points and prize money ==
=== Point distribution ===
Event	W	F	SF	QF	Round of 16	Round of 32	Q	Q3	Q2	Q1
Singles	280	180	110	60	30	1	18	14	10	1
Doubles	280	180	110	60	1	—	—	—	—	—

=== Prize money ===
Event	W	F	SF	QF	Round of 16	Round of 32^{1}	Q3	Q2	Q1
Singles	€34,677	€17,258	€9,113	€4,758	€2,669	€1,552	€810	€589	€427
Doubles *	€9,919	€5,161	€2,770	€1,468	€774	—	—	—	—

_{^{1} Qualifiers prize money is also the Round of 32 prize money}
_{* per team}

== Singles entrants ==
=== Seeds ===
Country	Player	Rank^{1}	Seed
CAN	Eugenie Bouchard	7	1
SRB	Ana Ivanovic	9	2
SVK	Dominika Cibulková	13	3
GER	Andrea Petkovic	17	4
GER	Sabine Lisicki	25	5
CZE	Barbora Záhlavová-Strýcová	28	6
CZE	Karolína Plíšková	29	7
FRA	Caroline Garcia	36	8

- Rankings as of September 29, 2014

=== Other entrants ===
The following players received wildcards into the singles main draw:

- (Germany) Sabine Lisicki
- (Austria) Patricia Mayr-Achleitner
- (Austria) Lisa-Maria Moser

The following players received entry from the qualifying draw:

- (United States) Madison Brengle
- (Germany) Anna-Lena Friedsam
- (Tunisia) Ons Jabeur
- (Czech Republic) Kateřina Siniaková

The following player received entry as a lucky loser:

- (Netherlands) Kiki Bertens

=== Withdrawals ===
Before the tournament

- (Czech Republic) Petra Cetkovská
- (Czech Republic) Lucie Šafářová
- (Spain) Carla Suárez Navarro (right elbow injury)
- (Russia) Elena Vesnina

During the tournament

- (Canada) Eugenie Bouchard (left thigh injury)
- (Serbia) Ana Ivanovic (hip injury)

=== Retirements ===
- (Romania) Irina-Camelia Begu (viral illness)
- (Slovakia) Magdaléna Rybáriková (left hip strain)

== Doubles entrants ==
=== Seeds ===
Country	Player	Country	Player	Rank^{1}	Seed
CZE	Lucie Hradecká	CZE	Barbora Záhlavová-Strýcová	56	1
NZL	Marina Erakovic	ESP	Anabel Medina Garrigues	66	2
CZE	Karolína Plíšková	CZE	Kristýna Plíšková	94	3
CAN	Gabriela Dabrowski	POL	Alicja Rosolska	109	4

- ^{1} Rankings as of September 29, 2014

=== Other entrants ===
The following pairs received wildcards into the doubles main draw:

- (Austria) Barbara Haas / (Austria) Patricia Mayr-Achleitner
- (Austria) Sandra Klemenschits / (Austria) Tamira Paszek
