= 2015 Generali Ladies Linz =

- Date: 12–18 October
- Edition: 29th
- Category: WTA International
- Draw: 32S / 16D
- Prize money: $250,000
- Surface: Hard (indoor)
- Location: Linz, Austria
- Venue: TipsArena Linz

Champions

Singles
- (Russia) Anastasia Pavlyuchenkova

Doubles
- (United States) Raquel Kops-Jones / (United States) Abigail Spears
← 2014 ·	Generali Ladies Linz	· 2016 →

The 2015 Generali Ladies Linz was a women's tennis tournament played on indoor hard courts. It was the 29th edition of the Generali Ladies Linz, and part of the WTA International tournaments-category of the 2015 WTA Tour. It was held at the TipsArena Linz in Linz, Austria, on 12–18 October 2015.

== Finals ==
=== Singles ===
- (Russia) Anastasia Pavlyuchenkova defeated (Germany) Anna-Lena Friedsam, 6–4, 6–3

=== Doubles ===
- (United States) Raquel Kops-Jones / (United States) Abigail Spears defeated (Czech Republic) Andrea Hlaváčková / (Czech Republic) Lucie Hradecká, 6–3, 7–5

== Points and prize money ==
=== Point distribution ===
Event	W	F	SF	QF	Round of 16	Round of 32	Q	Q2	Q1
Singles	280	180	110	60	30	1	18	12	1
Doubles	280	180	110	60	1	—	—	—	—

=== Prize money ===
Event	W	F	SF	QF	Round of 16	Round of 32^{1}	Q2	Q1
Singles	$43,000	$21,400	$11,500	$6,200	$3,420	$2,220	$1,285	$750
Doubles *	$12,300	$6,400	$3,435	$1,820	$960	—	—	—

_{^{1} Qualifiers prize money is also the Round of 32 prize money}
_{* per team}

== Singles entrants ==
=== Seeds ===
Country	Player	Rank^{1}	Seed
CZE	Lucie Šafářová	6	1
DEN	Caroline Wozniacki	11	2
ITA	Roberta Vinci	16	3
GER	Andrea Petkovic	21	4
~~SVK~~	~~Anna Karolína Schmiedlová~~	~~27~~	~~5~~
ITA	Camila Giorgi	31	6
RUS	Anastasia Pavlyuchenkova	32	7
CZE	Barbora Strýcová	34	8

- Rankings as of October 5, 2015

=== Other entrants ===
The following players received wildcards into the singles main draw:

- (Austria) Barbara Haas
- (Austria) Tamira Paszek
- (Germany) Andrea Petkovic
- (Czech Republic) Lucie Šafářová

The following players received entry from the qualifying draw:

- (Netherlands) Kiki Bertens
- (Czech Republic) Klára Koukalová
- (Serbia) Aleksandra Krunić
- (Switzerland) Stefanie Vögele

The following player received entry as a lucky loser:

- (United Kingdom) Johanna Konta

=== Withdrawals ===
Before the tournament

- (Italy) Sara Errani →replaced by (Belgium) Kirsten Flipkens
- (Slovakia) Daniela Hantuchová →replaced by (Germany) Anna-Lena Friedsam
- (United States) Madison Keys →replaced by (United States) Misaki Doi
- (Italy) Karin Knapp →replaced by (Russia) Margarita Gasparyan
- (Bulgaria) Tsvetana Pironkova →replaced by (Romania) Andreea Mitu
- (Slovakia) Anna Karolína Schmiedlová (viral illness) → replaced by (United Kingdom) Johanna Konta

== Doubles entrants ==
=== Seeds ===
Country	Player	Country	Player	Rank^{1}	Seed
USA	Raquel Kops-Jones	USA	Abigail Spears	31	1
CZE	Andrea Hlaváčková	CZE	Lucie Hradecká	41	2
ESP	Anabel Medina Garrigues	ESP	Arantxa Parra Santonja	65	3
GER	Julia Görges	SWE	Johanna Larsson	66	4

- ^{1} Rankings as of October 5, 2015

=== Other entrants ===
The following pairs received wildcards into the doubles main draw:

- (Germany) Annika Beck / (Austria) Tamira Paszek
- (Austria) Sandra Klemenschits / (Germany) Carina Witthöft
