= 2016 Generali Ladies Linz – Doubles =

Doubles
- 2016 Generali Ladies Linz

Final
- Champions: (Netherlands) Kiki Bertens (Sweden) Johanna Larsson
- Runners-up: (Germany) Anna-Lena Grönefeld (Czech Republic) Květa Peschke
- Score: 4–6, 6–2, [10–7]

Details
- Draw: 16
- Seeds: 4

Events
Singles	Doubles
- Linz Open

Raquel Atawo and Abigail Spears are the defending champions, but lost in the semifinals to Anna-Lena Grönefeld and Květa Peschke.

Kiki Bertens and Johanna Larsson won the title, defeating Grönefeld and Peschke in the final, 4–6, 6–2, [10–7].

== Seeds ==
1. (United States) Raquel Atawo / (United States) Abigail Spears (semifinals)
2. (Netherlands) Kiki Bertens / (Sweden) Johanna Larsson (champions)
3. (Germany) Anna-Lena Grönefeld / (Czech Republic) Květa Peschke (final)
4. (Netherlands) Demi Schuurs / (Czech Republic) Renata Voráčová (semifinals)

== Draw ==
Key

- Q = Qualifier
- WC = Wild card
- LL = Lucky loser
- Alt = Alternate
- ITF = ITF entry
- PR = Protected ranking
- SR = Special ranking
- SE = Special exempt
- JE = Junior exempt
- JR = Junior Accelerator Programme entrant
- CO = College Accelerator Programme entrant
- NG = Next Gen Accelerator Program entrant
- w/o = Walkover
- r = Retired
- d = Defaulted

First round
1	(United States) R Atawo (United States) A Spears	6	6
(Switzerland) X Knoll (Latvia) J Ostapenko	3	1
(Czech Republic) L Kunčíková (Czech Republic) K Stuchlá	5	3
(United States) M Brengle (Germany) N Geuer	7	6
3	(Germany) A-L Grönefeld (Czech Republic) K Peschke	6	6
(Germany) A Beck (Poland) A Rosolska	3	2
(Switzerland) V Golubic (United States) N Melichar	7	0	[10]
WC	(Austria) S Klemenschits (Switzerland) P Schnyder	5	6	[4]
(Belgium) E Mertens (Luxembourg) M Minella	2	6	[9]
(Switzerland) B Bencic (Belgium) K Flipkens	6	3	[11]
(United Kingdom) J Rae (United Kingdom) A Smith	4	7	[3]
4	(Netherlands) D Schuurs (Czech Republic) R Voráčová	6	5	[10]
(Belarus) L Marozava (Russia) M Melnikova	4	2
(Romania) A Mitu (Romania) R Olaru	6	6
WC	(Romania) A Bogdan (Austria) B Haas	3	1
2	(Netherlands) K Bertens (Sweden) J Larsson	6	6

Quarterfinals
1	(United States) R Atawo (United States) A Spears	6	6
(United States) M Brengle (Germany) N Geuer	1	1
3	(Germany) A-L Grönefeld (Czech Republic) K Peschke	6	3	[10]
(Switzerland) V Golubic (United States) N Melichar	4	6	[6]
(Switzerland) B Bencic (Belgium) K Flipkens	5	4
4	(Netherlands) D Schuurs (Czech Republic) R Voráčová	7	6
(Romania) A Mitu (Romania) R Olaru	3	4
2	(Netherlands) K Bertens (Sweden) J Larsson	6	6

Semifinals
1	(United States) R Atawo (United States) A Spears	2	5
3	(Germany) A-L Grönefeld (Czech Republic) K Peschke	6	7
4	(Netherlands) D Schuurs (Czech Republic) R Voráčová	7	3	[7]
2	(Netherlands) K Bertens (Sweden) J Larsson	5	6	[10]

Final
3	(Germany) A-L Grönefeld (Czech Republic) K Peschke	6	2	[7]
2	(Netherlands) K Bertens (Sweden) J Larsson	4	6	[10]
