= Anastasia Pavlyuchenkova =

Russian tennis player (born 1991)

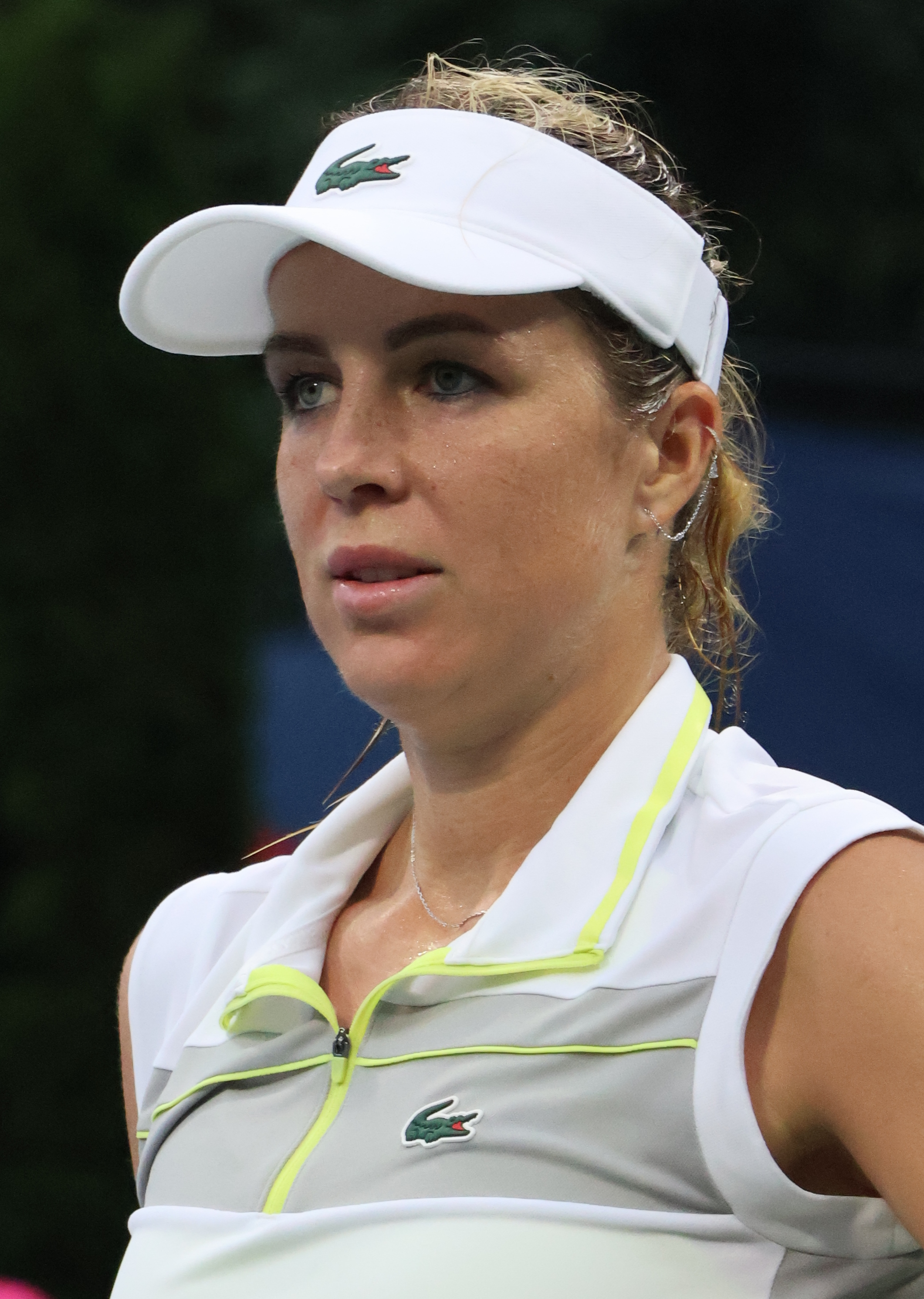
- Pavlyuchenkova at the 2023 US Open
- Full name: Anastasia Sergeyevna Pavlyuchenkova
- Country (sports): Russia
- Born: 3 July 1991 (age 35) Samara, Russian SFSR, Soviet Union
- Height: 1.76 m (5 ft 9 in)
- Turned pro: December 2005
- Plays: Right-handed (two-handed backhand)
- Coach: Alexander Pavlioutchenkov
- Prize money: $16,114,597: 40th in all-time rankings

Singles
- Career record: 526–374
- Career titles: 12
- Highest ranking: No. 11 (8 November 2021)
- Current ranking: No. 646 (16 November 2026)

Grand Slam singles results
- Australian Open: QF (2017, 2019, 2020, 2025)
- French Open: F (2021)
- Wimbledon: QF (2016, 2025)
- US Open: QF (2011)

Other tournaments
- Olympic Games: QF (2021)

Doubles
- Career record: 243–174
- Career titles: 6
- Highest ranking: No. 21 (16 September 2013)
- Current ranking: No. 504 (16 November 2026)

Grand Slam doubles results
- Australian Open: QF (2013)
- French Open: QF (2013, 2021)
- Wimbledon: QF (2014)
- US Open: QF (2015, 2018)

Mixed doubles
- Career titles: 1

Team competitions
- Fed Cup: W (2020–21), record 16–12
- Hopman Cup: 2–4
Medal record
Representing ROC
Olympic Games
Gold medal – first place	2020 Tokyo	Mixed doubles
Representing Russia
Universiade
Gold medal – first place	2013 Kazan	Doubles
- Last updated on: 18 November 2026.

Anastasia Sergeyevna "Nastia" Pavlyuchenkova (Анастаси́я «Настя» Серге́евна Павлюче́нкова; born 3 July 1991) is a Russian professional tennis player. She reached a career-high singles ranking of world No. 11 on 8 November 2021. Pavlyuchenkova has won twelve singles titles on the WTA Tour, and contested a major final at the 2021 French Open.

A junior prodigy, Pavlyuchenkova won three junior major titles and became the junior world No. 1 aged just 14. She was continuously ranked inside the world's top 50 from November 2008 to June 2022. Her biggest singles titles to date came at two Premier-level tournaments, the 2014 Open GDF Suez and the 2014 Kremlin Cup. In addition to her 2021 French Open final appearance, Pavlyuchenkova has contested nine other major quarterfinals.

Pavlyuchenkova has also had success in doubles, having won six doubles titles on the WTA Tour and achieving a career-high ranking of No. 21 on 16 September 2013. She has reached six major doubles quarterfinals, as well as winning two WTA 1000 titles at the 2013 Madrid Open with Lucie Šafářová and the 2022 Italian Open with Veronika Kudermetova. Furthermore, she won the gold medal at the 2020 Summer Olympics in mixed doubles with Andrey Rublev.

In team competition, Pavlyuchenkova was part of the winning Russian team at the 2020–21 Billie Jean King Cup, alongside Ekaterina Alexandrova, Daria Kasatkina, Veronika Kudermetova, and Liudmila Samsonova.

== Early life ==
Pavlyuchenkova was born in Samara in the Soviet Union to Sergey and Marina on 3 July 1991, as one of two children. Her father was a rower and her mother a swimmer. Her brother Alexander also played professional tennis for a time. Her grandmother played professional basketball, and her grandfather was an elite referee in that sport in the USSR.

Pavlyuchenkova started playing tennis at age six, with her parents helping her. Her brother Alexander often travels with her and provides advice for her play. She also trained at the Mouratoglou Tennis Academy during her early career.

== Career ==
=== 2006–2008: Junior success, debut in top 50 ===
Pavlyuchenkova first made headlines in 2006 by winning the Australian Open junior title, defeating Caroline Wozniacki in the final. She reached another junior Grand Slam final at the French Open where she lost to Agnieszka Radwańska. She then won the US Open junior title by beating Tamira Paszek in the final. Her successful career as a junior also saw her reach the world No. 1 ranking on 30 January 2006. She accumulated an overall win/loss of record of 131–23 and 87–22 in singles and doubles, respectively. Her success in juniors enabled her to enter ITF and WTA tournaments, winning an ITF event in Italy in May 2006. Five months later, Pavlyuchenkova received a wildcard into her maiden WTA Tour main-draw appearance at the Kremlin Cup. She lost in the first round to rising Czech, Nicole Vaidišová, in straight sets.

Pavlyuchenkova also played for the Sacramento Capitals of the World TeamTennis league in the summer of 2006.

In 2007, Pavlyuchenkova barely missed out on qualifying for the main draw of the Australian Open, losing to Julia Vakulenko in the final round of qualifying. However, she successfully defended her junior title by defeating Madison Brengle in the final. That same year, she received a wildcard into Wimbledon, her maiden Grand Slam appearance, but was overwhelmed by 10th seed Daniela Hantuchová in the first round in forty minutes.

The following year, she entered Wimbledon as the youngest player in the women's draw. She won her first round match against 17th seed Alizé Cornet and went on to defeat Li Na before falling to 11th seed Radwańska. At the US Open, the first Grand Slam at which she was able to gain direct entry, she won against American Vania King in the opening round in three sets, but was defeated in the second round by Patty Schnyder. Throughout 2008, Pavlyuchenkova captured four ITF singles, two of them coming at the end of the season in Poitiers and Bratislava. She ended the year inside the top 50 for the first time in her career, at world No. 45.

=== 2009: Indian Wells semifinals and top 30 debut ===
Pavlyuchenkova began 2009 season at the Auckland Open where she lost to Aravane Rezaï in the second round. At the Australian Open, she lost to Italian Tathiana Garbin in the first round in three sets. The following month at the Indian Wells Open, she enjoyed a breakthrough where she made her first Premier Mandatory semifinal. Along the way, she had defeated the likes of Marta Domachowska, world No. 2 Jelena Janković, Karin Knapp, Nuria Llagostera Vives, and world No. 10 Agnieszka Radwańska. However, she was defeated by the fifth seed and defending champion Ana Ivanovic. Pavlyuchenkova made her top 30 debut following the end of the tournament. In Miami, she defeated Rezaï in the first round but then fell to eventual champion Victoria Azarenka in straight sets.

The following week, Pavlyuchenkova made her Fed Cup debut, where Russia faced Italy in the semifinals, dropping her sole match to Francesca Schiavone. The Italian team eventually advanced to the final. Pavlyuchenkova ended 2009 as world No. 41, her second top-50 finish in a row. At the French Open where she was seeded at a Grand Slam tournament for the first time, 27th-seeded Pavlyuchenkova advanced to the third round of a Grand Slam for the first time as well after defeating both Raluca Olaru and Julie Coin in straight sets before losing to world No. 1, Dinara Safina. She then reached the second round at Wimbledon where she fell to Roberta Vinci. However, she lost in the first round of the US Open to eventual quarterfinalist Melanie Oudin.

=== 2010: First WTA Tour titles ===
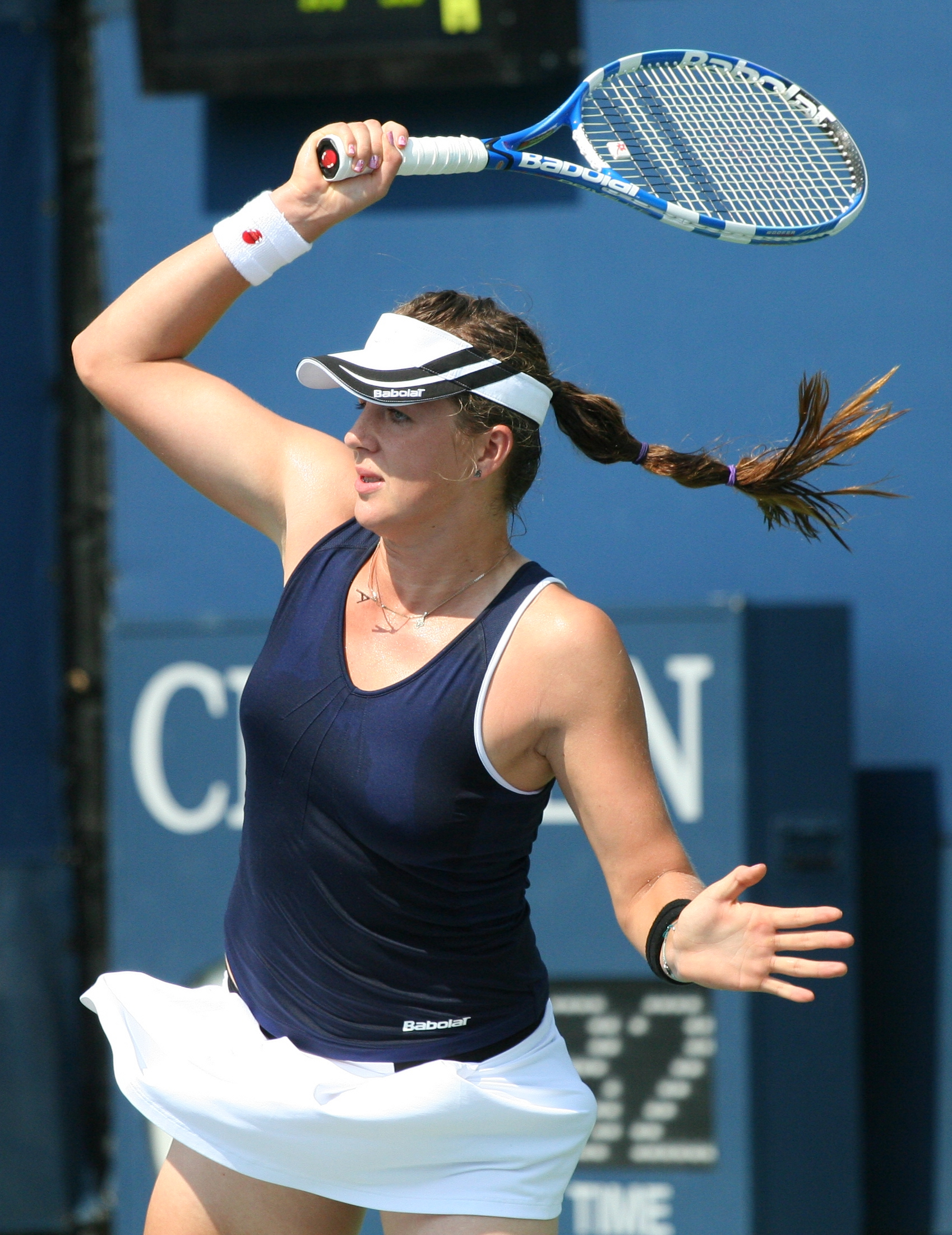
Pavlyuchenkova at the 2010 US Open

Pavlyuchenkova started the 2010 season by reaching the last eight at the Brisbane International where she was defeated by Ivanovic. At Melbourne, she lost in the second round of the Australian Open to fellow Russian Svetlana Kuznetsova. She then reached her first Premier-5-level quarterfinal, at the Dubai Championships by defeating Katarina Srebotnik, Tathiana Garbin and Daniela Hantuchová. There, she fell short to defending champion Venus Williams in straight sets. She then made the third round in Indian Wells and the round of 16 in Miami, losing to Samantha Stosur and Caroline Wozniacki, respectively.

Pavlyuchenkova then won her maiden career title at the Monterrey Open. En route to the final, she moved past the likes of Anna Tatishvili, Polona Hercog and Klára Zakopalová to reach the semifinals where she beat Anastasija Sevastova. In the final, she overcame second seed Hantuchová in three sets to win the title. Pavlyuchenkova was the 29th seed at the French Open and reached the third round where she lost to top seed Serena Williams, in three sets. She also made the third round at Wimbledon where she lost to Wozniacki.

After a quarterfinal appearance at the Slovenia Open where she lost to eventual runner-up Johanna Larsson, Pavlyuchenkova entered the İstanbul Cup seeded third. She reached the last four after seeing off Marta Domachowska, Magdaléna Rybáriková and Sorana Cîrstea, all in straight sets. She then reached the final by beating Jarmila Groth. She faced Elena Vesnina in the final and defeated her elder Russian opponent in three sets to win her second career title.

Pavlyuchenkova continued her good form in Cincinnati, beating Hantuchová and defending champion Elena Dementieva to advance to the third round where she moved past 13th seed Shahar Pe'er. In the quarterfinals, she scored a comeback win over 12th seed Yanina Wickmayer to advance to her first Premier 5 semifinal. There, she fell to Maria Sharapova in three sets. She then lost in the opening round of the Rogers Cup to Kuznetsova, in three sets.

At the US Open, 22nd seed Pavlyuchenkova posted her best major result at that time by reaching the round of 16. There, she lost to Francesca Schiavone Schiavone in straight sets. Pavlyuchenkova's last tournament of the season was the Tournament of Champions in Bali. It was her debut appearance after winning two International titles throughout the year in Monterrey and İstanbul. However, she lost to eventual champion Ivanovic at the first hurdle. She finished the year inside the top 30 for the first time ever, at world No. 21.

=== 2011: Two major quarterfinals ===
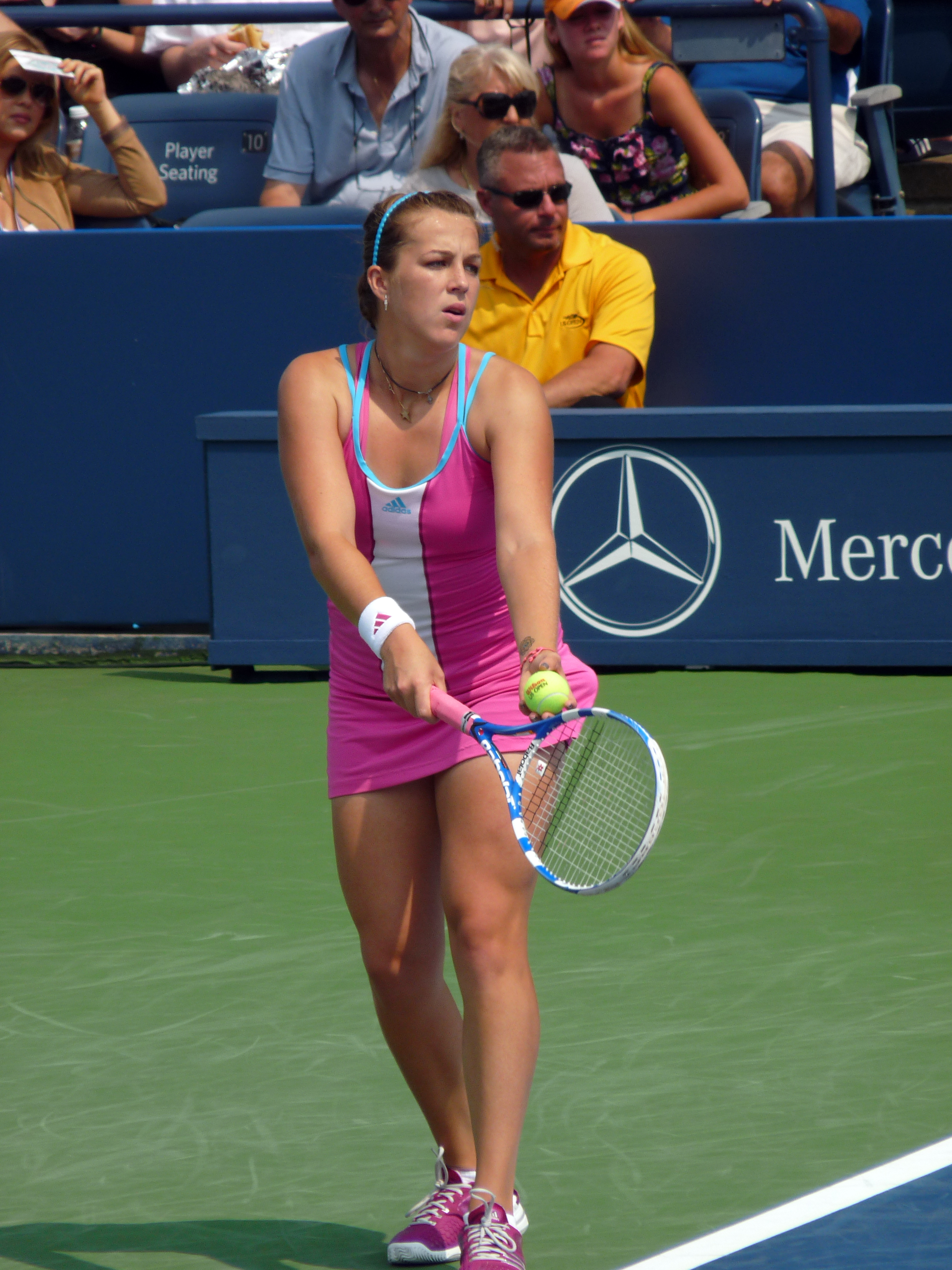
Pavlyuchenkova at the 2011 US Open

Pavlyuchenkova opened her 2011 season in Brisbane where she was seeded fifth. Despite being pushed to three sets in two prior matches, she managed to reach the semifinals where she fell to eventual champion Petra Kvitová. She made her top 20 debut following her good result there. The following week, in Hobart, Pavlyuchenkova was forced to retire in the opening round against Bethanie Mattek-Sands. At the Australian Open, she was the 18th seeded and advanced to the third round after defeating Kirsten Flipkens and Kristina Barrois, before losing to Iveta Benešová in a three-setter.

In Fed Cup competition, Pavlyuchenkova helped Russia rally from an 0–2 deficit against France by winning her reverse singles match against Alizé Cornet and the decisive doubles match, partnering with Svetlana Kuznetsova, thus allowing the Russian team to advance to the semifinals. After an early exit in Dubai, she successfully defended her title at the Monterrey Open, prevailing over top seed Jelena Janković in the final, in three sets. She then reached the third round of the Indian Wells Open, falling to tenth seed Shahar Pe'er. This was followed by a fourth-round loss to eventual champion, Victoria Azarenka, in three sets at the Miami Open. Pavlyuchenkova then helped Russia beat Italy to advance to the Fed Cup final. She beat Sara Errani in her singles rubber match and then teamed up with Ekaterina Makarova to defeat Alberta Brianti and Maria Elena Camerin in the decisive doubles rubber.

Pavlyuchenkova began the clay-court season at the Porsche Tennis Grand Prix where she lost to second seed Vera Zvonareva in the round of 16. She then defeated Zheng Jie, Marion Bartoli and Samantha Stosur to reach the quarterfinals of the Madrid Open where she lost to Julia Görges. The following week in Rome, Pavlyuchenkova advanced to the round of 16 where she lost to third seed Victoria Azarenka, in three sets. Pavlyuchenkova was the 14th seed at the French Open and advanced to her first ever Grand Slam quarterfinal after racking in wins over Yaroslava Shvedova, qualifiers Mona Barthel and Nuria Llagostera Vives and third seed Zvonareva. There, she came up short to defending champion Francesca Schiavone in three sets despite having been two games away from upsetting the Italian.

Pavlyuchenkova had a dismal grass-court campaign, dropping her opening match in Eastbourne to Bojana Jovanovski and falling in the second round of the Wimbledon Championships to Nadia Petrova in straight sets. Nevertheless, she hit her career-high ranking of world No. 13 after the conclusion of Wimbledon. She then competed at the Baku Cup but crashed out to Galina Voskoboeva in the quarterfinals, hitting a bizarre 27 double faults in the process.

After opening-round losses in Toronto and Cincinnati to María José Martínez Sánchez and Flavia Pennetta, respectively, Pavlyuchenkova advanced to the quarterfinals at the New Haven Open where she lost to Li Na. At the US Open, Pavlyuchenkova was the 17th seed and defeated Anna Tatishvili, Petra Martić and Janković to reach the fourth round. There, she avenged her earlier two losses to Schiavone to cruise into her second Grand Slam quarterfinal where she lost to eventual runner-up Serena Williams, in straight sets. At Tokyo, she overcame Arantxa Rus in the first round but was then upset by Vania King in the following round in straight sets.

Pavlyuchenkova suffered an early exit at the Pan Pacific Open in the hands of Vania King but rebounded well to reach the quarterfinals of the China Open. There, she lost to ninth seed Andrea Petkovic in straight sets. At the Ladies Linz she beat Anabel Medina Garrigues, before falling to qualifier Sorana Cîrstea in the second round. In Luxembourg, Pavlyuchenkova suffered a shocking loss to Rebecca Marino in the first round. In the Fed Cup final, the Russian team faced the team of the Czech Republic. Despite winning her only singles rubber against Lucie Šafářová in straight sets, the Russian team came up short in the end when they lost the decisive doubles match. Pavlyuchenkova ended 2011 at world No. 16, her first ever top-20 finish to a season.

=== 2012: Inconsistencies ===
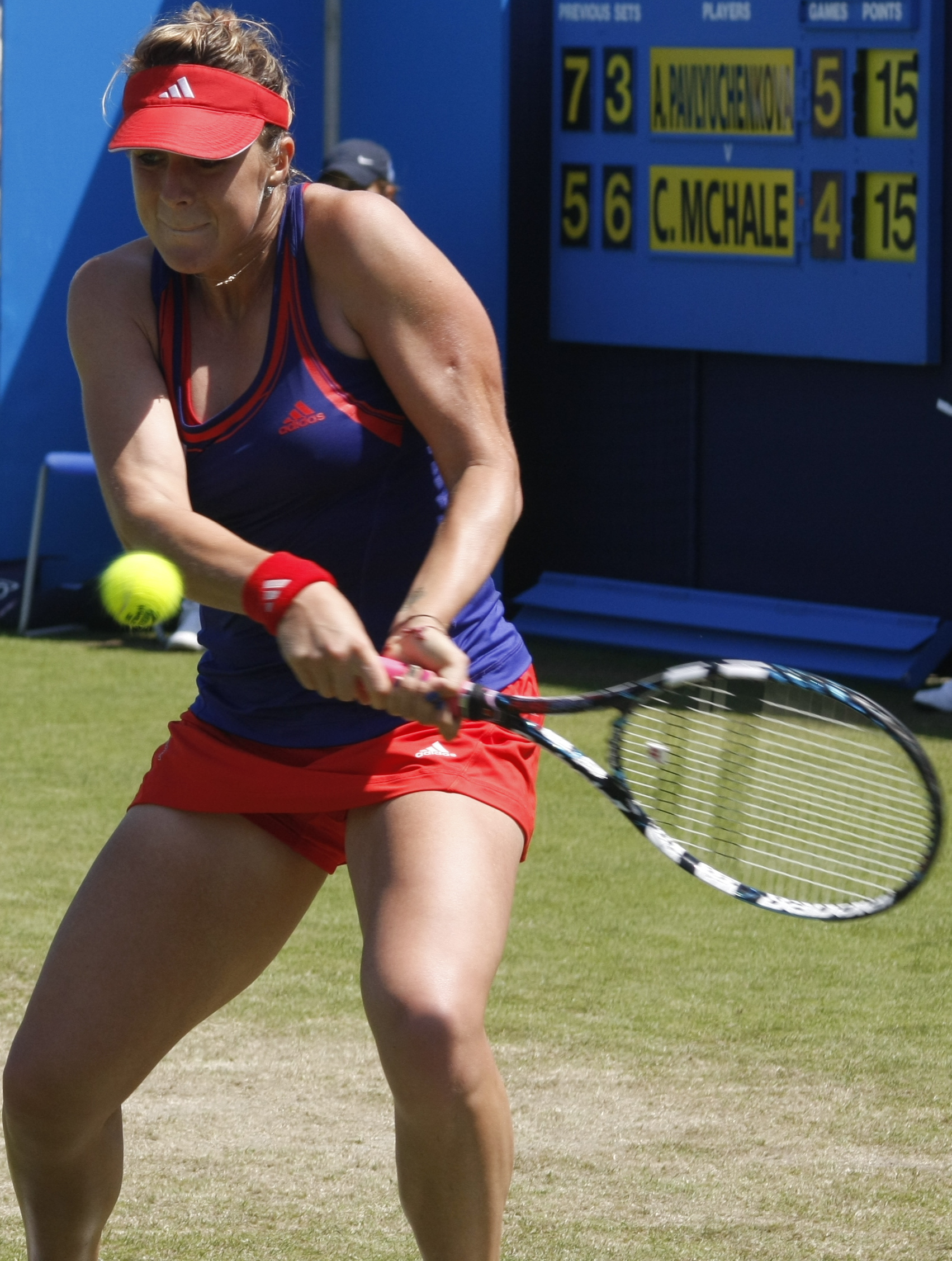
Pavlyuchenkova at the 2012 Eastbourne International

Pavlyuchenkova started the 2012 season with a loss to eventual champion Kaia Kanepi in the second round of the Brisbane International. She then dropped her opening match in Sydney to Andrea Petkovic, and exited the Australian Open in the second round to Vania King. She then suffered a four-match losing streak in the next two months before snapping it at the Charleston Open in April where she beat Eleni Daniilidou in her opening match in three sets. She then lost to compatriot Nadia Petrova in the following round. After that, she dropped both her singles matches while on Fed Cup duty in the semifinals against Serbia.

During the clay-court swing, Pavlyuchenkova fell in the second round of Madrid and Rome. Seeded 22nd at the French Open, she won back-to-back matches for the first time since Beijing last year to reach the third round where she was stunned by Klára Zakopalová in straight sets. Her ranking fell outside the top 30 after the French Open concluded. On grass, she reached the quarterfinals in Eastbourne where she lost to Zakopalová once more. At Wimbledon, she lost to Varvara Lepchenko in the second round.

Pavlyuchenkova's form improved after Wimbledon when she made the quarterfinals in Båstad and then went on to reach her first final of the year at the Washington Open where she was beaten by Magdaléna Rybáriková. After falling at the first hurdle in Montreal, she cruised into the last eight in Cincinnati where she lost to Petra Kvitová. This resulted in her return to the top 20. However, she suffered a setback at the US Open when she was upset in the second round by wildcard Kristina Mladenovic. Pavlyuchenkova went on to win just one more match in her last three tournaments of the year when she beat Chanelle Scheepers in the first round of Tokyo before falling to seventh seed Li Na. Her ranking then plummeted to No. 34 after falling in the first round of Beijing. She finished the year ranked World No. 36.

=== 2013: Two singles titles, Premier Mandatory doubles title ===
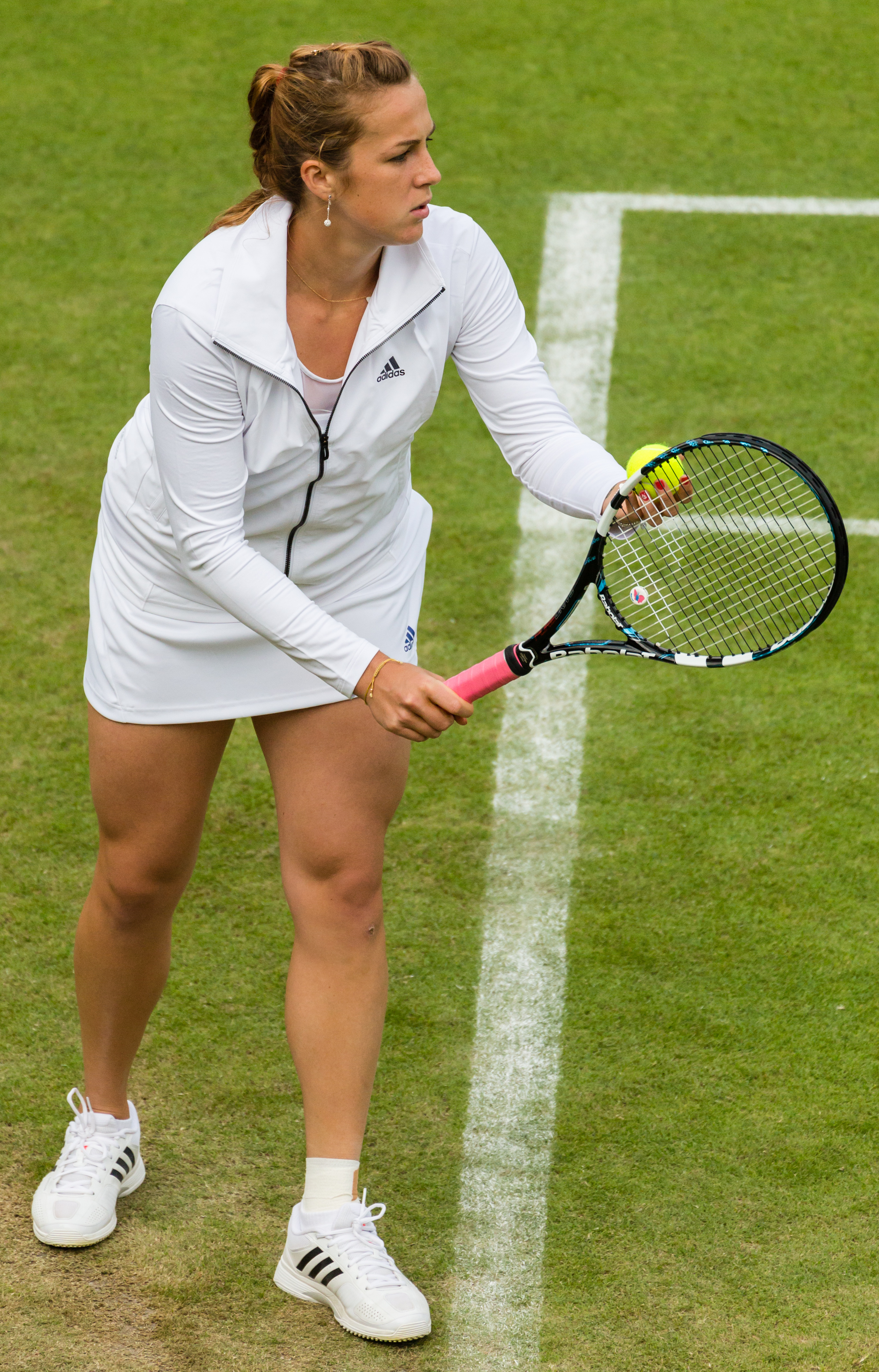
Pavlyuchenkova at the 2013 Wimbledon Championships

Pavlyuchenkova kicked off her 2013 season brilliantly by advancing to the final of the Brisbane International where she went down to third seed Serena Williams. Along the way, she had defeated the likes of sixth seed Petra Kvitová and fourth seed Angelique Kerber, in the second round and quarterfinals respectively. However, at the Australian Open, she fell at the first hurdle to Lesia Tsurenko. She was then defeated in her opening matches at Paris and Dubai by Yanina Wickmayer and Ana Ivanovic, respectively.

At the Malaysian Open, Pavlyuchenkova was the only seed to reach the last four but there, she was upset by wildcard Bethanie Mattek-Sands. This was then followed by winless appearances in Indian Wells and Miami. At the Monterrey Open, she saw off Nina Bratchikova, Tereza Mrdeža to reach the quarterfinals. She then went on to beat Lauren Davis and Monica Niculescu to reach the final where she stunned top seed Kerber in three sets for her third title in Monterrey, also her fourth career title overall and her first since defending her title here in 2011. She climbed back into the top 20 rankings after Monterrey. In the Fed Cup semifinals against Slovakia, she lost her singles match to Dominika Cibulková but Russia nevertheless advanced to the final by winning the decisive doubles rubber.

After a second-round loss to Kerber in Stuttgart, Pavlyuchenkova captured her sixth career title and her first on clay at the Portugal Open. Along the way, she beat qualifiers Shahar Pe'er and Estrella Cabeza Candela to reach the quarterfinals where she defeated Elena Vesnina. She then overcame Swiss Romina Oprandi to reach the final where she beat fourth seed Carla Suárez Navarro in straight sets. The result was followed up with first-round exits in Madrid and Rome. However, she won her first Premier doubles title in Madrid with Lucie Šafářová. She then beat Andrea Hlaváčková in the first round at the French Open before falling to Czech Petra Cetkovská in the following round. Pavlyuchenkova was easily ousted by Tsvetana Pironkova in the first round of Wimbledon, winning just one game.

She posted early losses in Toronto and Cincinnati which resulted in her ranking sliding to world No. 34. However, she rebounded to reach the quarterfinals of New Haven where she lost to defending champion Kvitová in three sets. At the US Open, Pavlyuchenkova was seeded 32nd and defeated a pair of wildcards Virginie Razzano and Ashleigh Barty to advance to third round where lost to third seed Agnieszka Radwańska in straight sets. After the US Open, she made her fourth final of the season in Seoul, succumbing to Radwańska once again, this time in three sets. She then dropped her opening matches in Tokyo and Beijing to Simona Halep and eventual runner-up Jelena Janković, respectively.

At the Kremlin Cup, Pavlyuchenkova made her first quarterfinal of the tournament after defeating Caroline Garcia and third seed Maria Kirilenko. She then beat Daniela Hantuchová to reach the semifinals but lost to eventual champion Halep. She finished the year at the Tournament of Champions in Sofia for the second time in her career as a result of winning International tournaments in Monterrey and Oeiras throughout the season. As the sixth seed, she recorded wins over alternate Elina Svitolina and seventh seed Alizé Cornet in the round robin but suffered a loss to top seed Halep. Nevertheless, she finished second in the group behind Halep, thus advancing to the semifinals, where she succumbed to fourth seed Samantha Stosur in three sets. Pavlyuchenkova ended the year at World No. 26.

Pavlyuchenkova experienced a breakthrough in doubles in 2013. Partnering Lucie Šafářová, she reached her first two Grand Slam quarterfinals in doubles at the Australian Open and the French Open. The pair also won the Premier Mandatory-level Madrid Open by defeating Cara Black and Marina Erakovic in the final, it is Pavlyuchenkova's biggest career doubles title to date.

=== 2014: Two WTA Premier titles ===
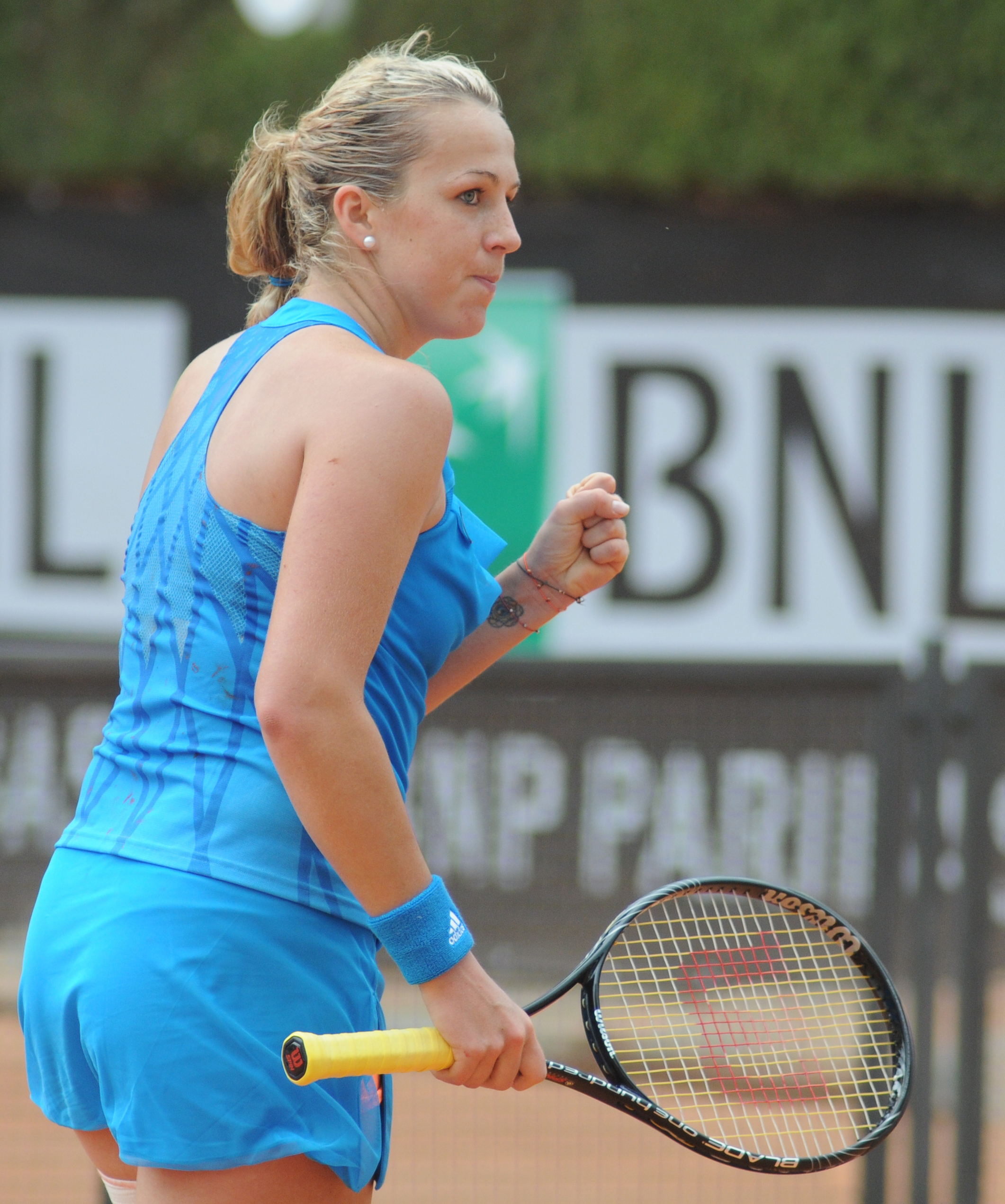
Pavlyuchenkova at the 2014 Italian Open

Pavlyuchenkova began her 2014 season in Brisbane. After defeating fellow Russian Alla Kudryavtseva in the opening round, she retired against fifth seed Angelique Kerber with a thigh injury. Seeded fourth at the Hobart, she was upset by Alison Riske in the first round in straight sets. Pavlyuchenkova was the 29th seed at the Australian Open and defeated Teliana Pereira and Mandy Minella to reach the third round where she lost to eventual semifinalist Agnieszka Radwańska in three sets.

The following month, she won the sixth and biggest title of her career to date at the Premier-level Paris Indoors event. Despite being unseeded, she overcame Francesca Schiavone in her opener and went on to beat three seeded opponents in Carla Suárez Navarro, Kerber and Maria Sharapova to reach the final where she prevailed over third seed Sara Errani to claim the title. It was her first title indoors as well. She then suffered an early loss at the Qatar Ladies Open to Mirjana Lučić-Baroni. At the Indian Wells Open, Pavlyuchenkova beat Caroline Garcia in her opening match but was then stopped by wildcard Aleksandra Wozniak in three sets. Another early loss ensued, this time to CoCo Vandeweghe in Miami.

Pavlyuchenkova then defeated Latvia's Diāna Marcinkēviča in the first round of the Stuttgart Grand Prix before falling to two-time defending champion Sharapova in the following round in straight sets. At the Madrid Open, she defeated María Teresa Torró Flor and sixth seed Jelena Janković to reach the round of 16 where she lost to Ana Ivanovic. The following week in Rome, she drew qualifier Belinda Bencic in the opening round and lost to the Swiss in three sets. Pavlyuchenkova was the 24th seed at the French Open and survived her opening clash against veteran Kimiko Date-Krumm in the first round but was then forced to retire against Kiki Bertens in following round. During the grass-court swing, Pavlyuchenkova upset top seed Radwańska in the first round of Eastbourne but then lost to compatriot Ekaterina Makarova in the following round, in straight sets. She then dropped her opening match at the Wimbledon Championships, for the second year in a row, to Riske.

In July, Pavlyuchenkova suffered a shocking loss in the opening round of Båstad to Grace Min. She then reached her second quarterfinal of the year at Washington after beating Virginie Razzano and Hiroko Kuwata. There, she fell to Makarova once more. She then lost to eventual finalist Venus Williams in the first round of the Rogers Cup. The following week in Cincinnati, she saw off 11th seed Dominika Cibulková in the first round and then went on to beat Karin Knapp to reach the round of 16 where she lost to Sharapova in straight sets. At the US Open where she was seeded 23rd, she crashed out in the second round to wildcard Nicole Gibbs, in three sets.

After an early loss to Garbiñe Muguruza in Tokyo, Pavlyuchenkova scored her first win over Ivanovic, via retirement from the Serb, en route the second round in Wuhan where she lost to Casey Dellacqua. She then retired against Zhu Lin in the first round in Beijing due to dizziness. To finish the year, Pavlyuchenkova played the Kremlin Cup where she was the sixth seed. She defeated the likes of Ana Konjuh and Riske to reach the last eight where she beat fellow Russian Vitalia Diatchenko in three sets. She then advanced to the final, after overcoming Kateřina Siniaková, where she faced Romanian Irina-Camelia Begu. She won the match in three sets to capture her seventh and equal-biggest career title to date. She concluded the year as World No. 25.

=== 2015: Slow start and late-season surge ===
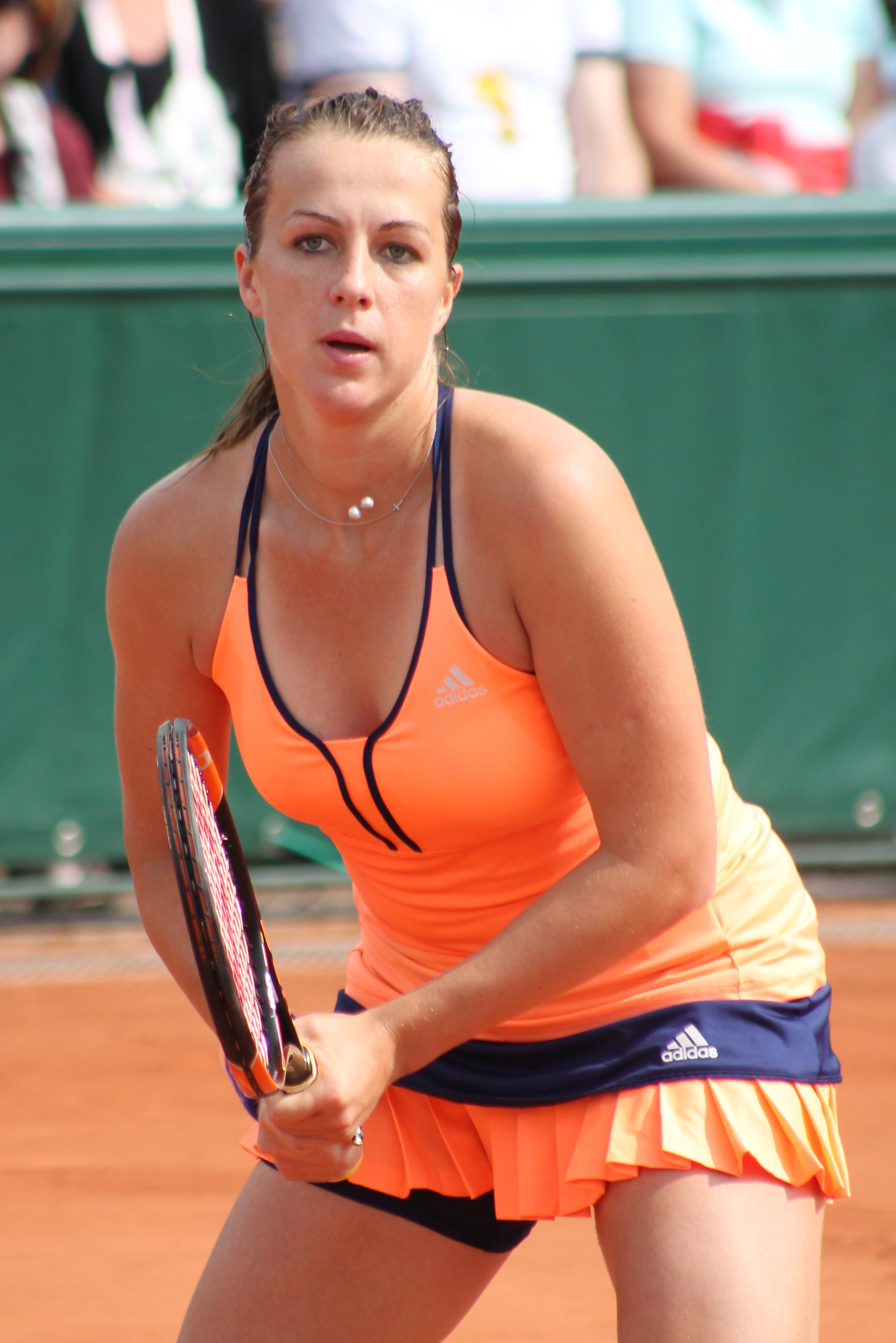
Pavlyuchenkova at the 2015 French Open

Pavlyuchenkova endured a three-match losing streak to start off her 2015 season, a stretch which includes the Australian Open and Dubai, which culminated in her ranking falling to as low as No. 41, her lowest since 2009. At the Monterrey Open, Pavlyuchenkova recorded her first victories of the year by defeating Anna Karolína Schmiedlová and Johanna Larsson to reach the quarterfinals where she lost to second seed Sara Errani. It was her first ever defeat at the tournament.

At Indian Wells, Pavlyuchenkova scored wins over Larsson and 17th seed Barbora Strýcová to reach the third round where she lost to 12th seed Suárez Navarro. The following week in Miami, she lost to Errani in the second round. Pavlyuchenkova then retired in her opening match against Sara Sorribes Tormo in Charleston due to a shoulder injury. In the Fed Cup semifinal tie against Germany, Pavlyuchenkova won her singles rubber over Sabine Lisicki and then partnered Elena Vesnina to defeat Lisicki and Andrea Petkovic in the decisive doubles match, thus sending Russia into its first Fed Cup final since 2011.

After an early exit in Prague, Pavlyuchenkova made the last 16 in Madrid where she lost to eventual champion Petra Kvitová, and the second round in Rome where he lost to defending champion Serena Williams. At the French Open, where Pavlyuchenkova was unseeded at a Grand Slam for the first time since the 2010 Australian Open, she fell to eventual runner-up Lucie Šafářová at the first hurdle. On grass, Pavlyuchenkova lost in the second round of the Rosmalen Open to Kiki Bertens in straight sets. At Wimbledon, she was defeated in the second round by tenth seed Angelique Kerber.

After exiting in the first round of İstanbul, Pavlyuchenkova made her first semifinal of the year the following week in Baku by defeating Elizaveta Kulichkova, Kateryna Bondarenko and Kirsten Flipkens. There, she was upset by Romanian Patricia Maria Țig. She then advanced to her first final of the season at the Washington Open, her second at the tournament, but was denied the title once again, this time by American Sloane Stephens. At the Cincinnati Open, Pavlyuchenkova advanced to the last eight but was defeated by third seed Simona Halep. At the US Open, 31st-seeded Pavlyuchenkova bowed out in the second round to qualifier Anett Kontaveit.

After another loss to Halep in the second round of Wuhan, Pavlyuchenkova cruised into her second quarterfinal at the China Open where she fell to sixth seed Ana Ivanovic in straight sets. In Linz, she cruised into the last four without the loss of a set, with wins over Kateřina Siniaková, Stefanie Vögele and Aleksandra Krunić. There, she moved past Flipkens in three sets, and then defeated German Anna-Lena Friedsam in the final in straight sets for her eighth career title. It was also her third straight title indoors. As the defending champion in Moscow, she carried on her good form by advancing to her third final of the year but saw her title defence come to an end in the hands of compatriot Svetlana Kuznetsova. Pavlyuchenkova finished the year ranked world No. 28, her fifth overall top 30 finish to a season.

In the Fed Cup final against Czech Republic, Pavlyuchenkova lost both her singles rubbers and then teamed up with Vesnina in the decisive doubles match but came up second best to the Czech team in the end.

=== 2016: Wimbledon quarters and steady ranking ===
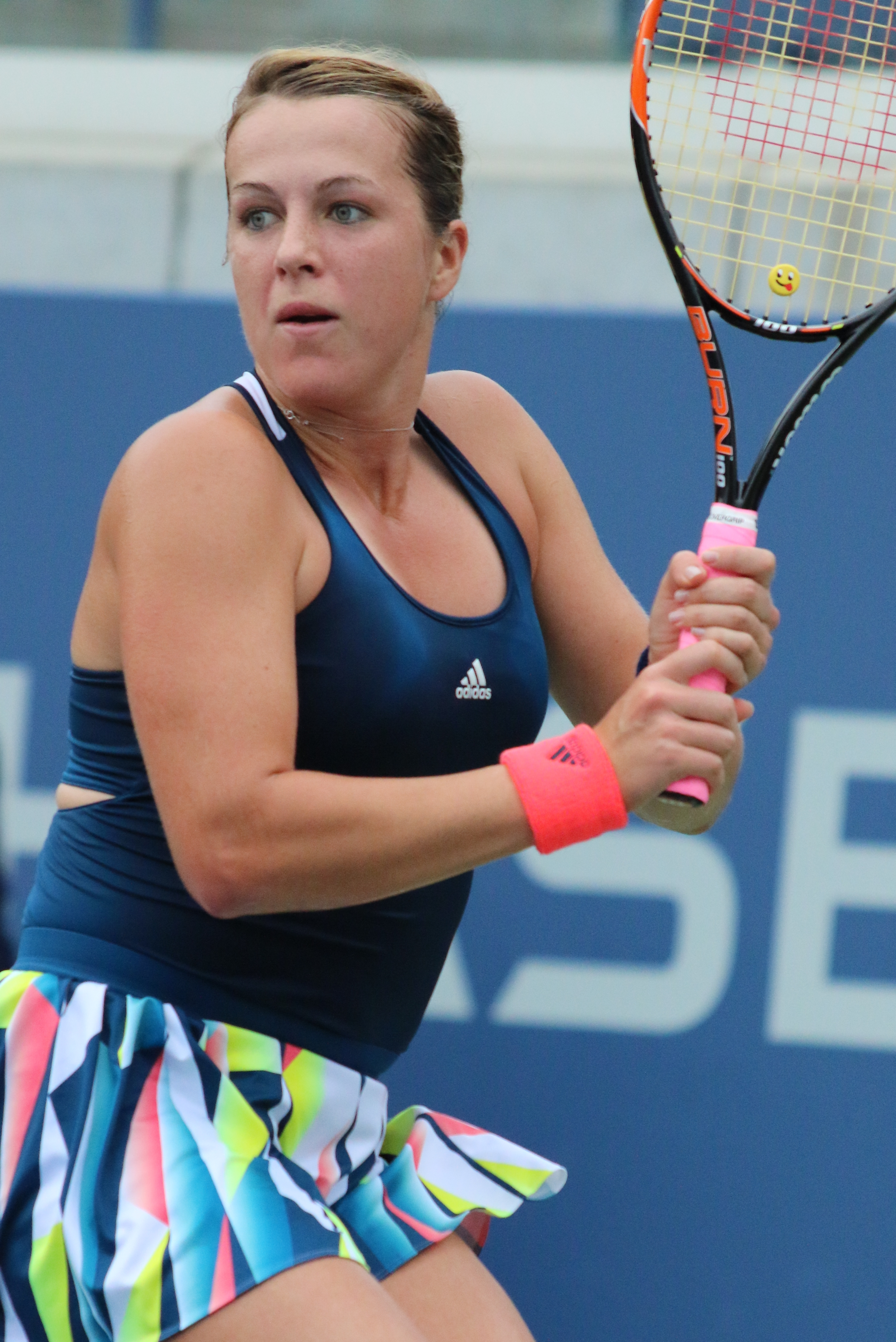
Pavlyuchenkova at the 2016 US Open

Pavlyuchenkova began the 2016 season at the Brisbane International, reaching the quarterfinals by beating fifth seed Timea Bacsinszky and Alizé Cornet. There, she fell to eventual runner-up Angelique Kerber. The following week in Sydney, she lost to Karolína Plíšková in the second round. She then suffered a second consecutive first round loss at the Australian Open when she fell to Lauren Davis in her opening match. She then reached the quarterfinals on home soil in St. Petersburg after seeing off Klára Koukalová and Carina Witthöft but there, she was beaten by eventual runner-up Belinda Bencic. She then made the quarterfinals in Acapulco where she lost to Yanina Wickmayer, but then suffered her first ever opening-round defeat in Monterrey where she lost to Pauline Parmentier, in straight sets.

After a going winless in tournaments throughout the months of March and April, which includes the Indian Wells and Miami Opens, Pavlyuchenkova advanced to the round of 16 at the Madrid Open for the third year in a row. There, she succumbed to eventual runner-up Dominika Cibulková in three sets. At the Italian Open, she lost to 13th seed Ana Ivanovic in the first round. At the French Open, Pavlyuchenkova won back-to-back matches at a Grand Slam tournament for the first time since the 2014 Australian Open, defeating the likes of Sorribes Tormo and Çağla Büyükakçay to book her spot in the third round where she was beaten by compatriot Svetlana Kuznetsova.

Pavlyuchenkova started the grass-court season with opening-round losses to Jeļena Ostapenko and Madison Brengle in Birmingham and Eastbourne, respectively. At the Wimbledon Championships, Pavlyuchenkova was the 21st seed and she moved past Hsieh Su-wei and Yulia Putintseva to reach the third round where she upset Timea Bacsinszky to advance to the second week of a Grand Slam tournament for the first time since the 2011 US Open. In the fourth round, she defeated CoCo Vandeweghe for a place in her third Grand Slam quarterfinal, also her first since the 2011 US Open. There, she faced Serena Williams and was defeated by the defending champion, in straight sets. Following the conclusion of Wimbledon, Pavlyuchenkova re-entered the top 20 rankings for the first time in more than four years at No. 19.

Carrying her good form into the Rogers Cup, she was seeded 16th and she saw off Putintseva and Christina McHale before upsetting fourth seed Agnieszka Radwańska for a place in her fifth quarterfinal of the year. There, she was defeated by eventual runner-up Madison Keys in three sets. Making her debut appearance at the Summer Olympics in Rio de Janeiro, Pavlyuchenkova defeated Pole Magda Linette in the opening round but was then beaten by eventual gold medalist Monica Puig in the second round. She then lost in the round of 16 at Cincinnati to Garbiñe Muguruza. At the US Open, Pavlyuchenkova reached the third round where she was beaten by eventual runner-up Plíšková.

After an unfruitful Asian swing, where she managed just one win from three tournaments, Pavlyuchenkova then went on to finish the year by recording another two quarterfinal appearances, in Linz, where she was the defending champion but fell to eventual champion Cibulková, and in Moscow, to eventual runner-up Daria Gavrilova. The loss to Gavrilova meant Pavlyuchenkova had failed to reach a semifinal throughout the season, her best result being seven quarterfinal showings. Nevertheless, she maintained her year-end ranking from the previous year, World No. 28.

=== 2017: Australian Open quarters and three titles ===
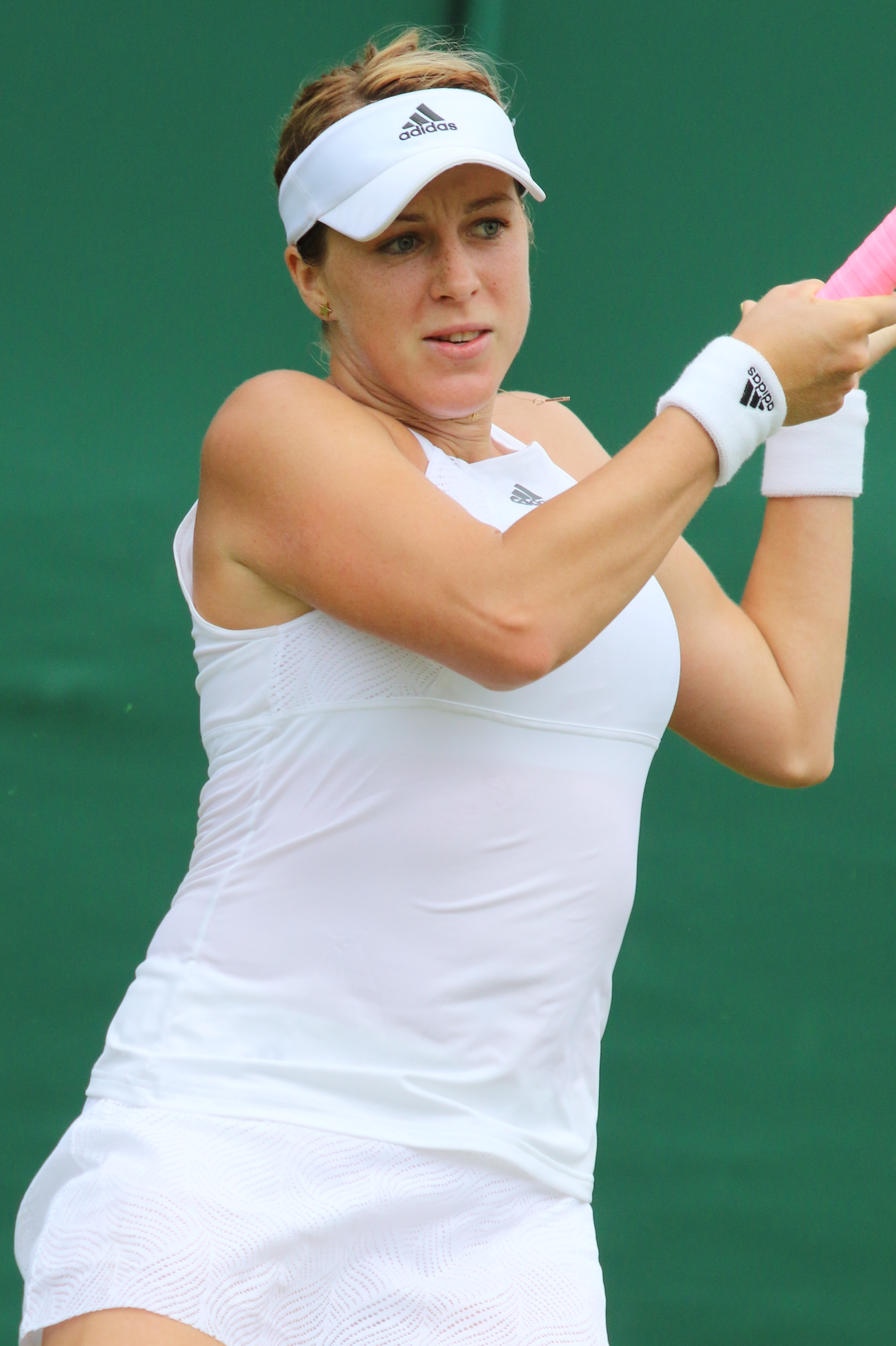
Pavlyuchenkova at the 2017 Wimbledon Championships

Pavlyuchenkova opened her new season at the Auckland Open where she was defeated in the opening round by Julia Görges. She then made the quarterfinals in Sydney by claiming excellent victories over Samantha Stosur and defending champion Svetlana Kuznetsova before falling to Eugenie Bouchard in straight sets. Seeded 24th at the Australian Open, Pavlyuchenkova defeated a pair of Russians in Evgeniya Rodina and Natalia Vikhlyantseva to reach the third round where she saw off 11th seed Elina Svitolina in three sets, thus advancing to her maiden second week appearance at the tournament. There, she took down an eighth-seeded Kuznetsova in straight sets to cruise into her fourth overall Grand Slam quarterfinal, her second in as many as six months. With this achievement, Pavlyuchenkova has now made the quarterfinals at each of the four major events. There, she lost to eventual runner-up Venus Williams in straight sets.

After a string of early losses in the Middle East, Pavlyuchenkova rebounded at the Indian Wells Open. There, she beat Anett Kontaveit and 17th seed Barbora Strýcová before going on to upset fifth seed Dominika Cibulková in three sets to reach her first quarterfinal here since her semifinal run back in 2009. There, she fell to eventual runner-up Kuznetsova in straight sets. She then exited in the third round of the Miami Open to Bethanie Mattek-Sands.

The following month, in Monterrey, Pavlyuchenkova reached the quarterfinals after defeating Tatjana Maria and qualifier Kristie Ahn, before surviving fifth seed Tímea Babos to cruise into her first semifinal in eleven tries, her first since the Kremlin Cup in 2015. There, she beat third seed Caroline Garcia and in a rematch of the 2013 final, top seed Angelique Kerber, for her ninth career title, her fourth at the tournament. After an unsuccessful Fed Cup campaign against Belgium for a place in the World Group, dropping her singles match to Elise Mertens, with the Russian team ultimately losing the tie 2–3, Pavlyuchenkova reached her second final of the year in Rabat. En route, she had defeated the likes of Conny Perrin, Ekaterina Makarova, seventh seed Lauren Davis and Sara Errani. She then beat Francesca Schiavone in straight sets for her tenth career title, her second on clay. She then dropped her opener in Madrid to Sorana Cîrstea, and then reached the third round in Rome where she lost to Simona Halep. She suffered an early defeat at the French Open, falling to Paraguay's Verónica Cepede Royg in the second round, in three sets.

On grass, Pavlyuchenkova reached the second round in Mallorca and the last 16 in Eastbourne, but then succumbed at the first hurdle of Wimbledon to qualifier Arina Rodionova in three sets. She then recorded a quarterfinal appearance in Stanford before suffering early losses at the Rogers Cup and the Cincinnati Open. After reaching the last eight of New Haven, she exited in the opening round of the US Open to Christina McHale.

Pavlyuchenkova began the Asian swing in Tokyo where she reached the final, falling to Caroline Wozniacki in straight sets. After dropping her opener in Wuhan, she made the second round in Beijing but lost to Wozniacki once again. At the Hong Kong Open, Pavlyuchenkova advanced to the final by beating Babos, Jacqueline Cako, Naomi Osaka and Wang Qiang, all in straight sets. There, she overcame Daria Gavrilova in a long three-setter to claim her third title of the year, her 11th career singles title. However, this was followed by a loss in the opening round of the Kremlin Cup. Nevertheless, Pavlyuchenkova's strong results throughout the year ensured her qualification for the WTA Elite Trophy. It was her debut appearance at the tournament and her first at a year-end championship since the Tournament of Champions in 2013. In her opener, she defeated Angelique Kerber, for the third time in 2017, before falling to Ashleigh Barty, in straight sets. She was eliminated in the round-robin stage. She concluded 2017 as world No. 15, her best season-finish to date, and second in the top 20 overall.

=== 2018: Out of top 40 ===
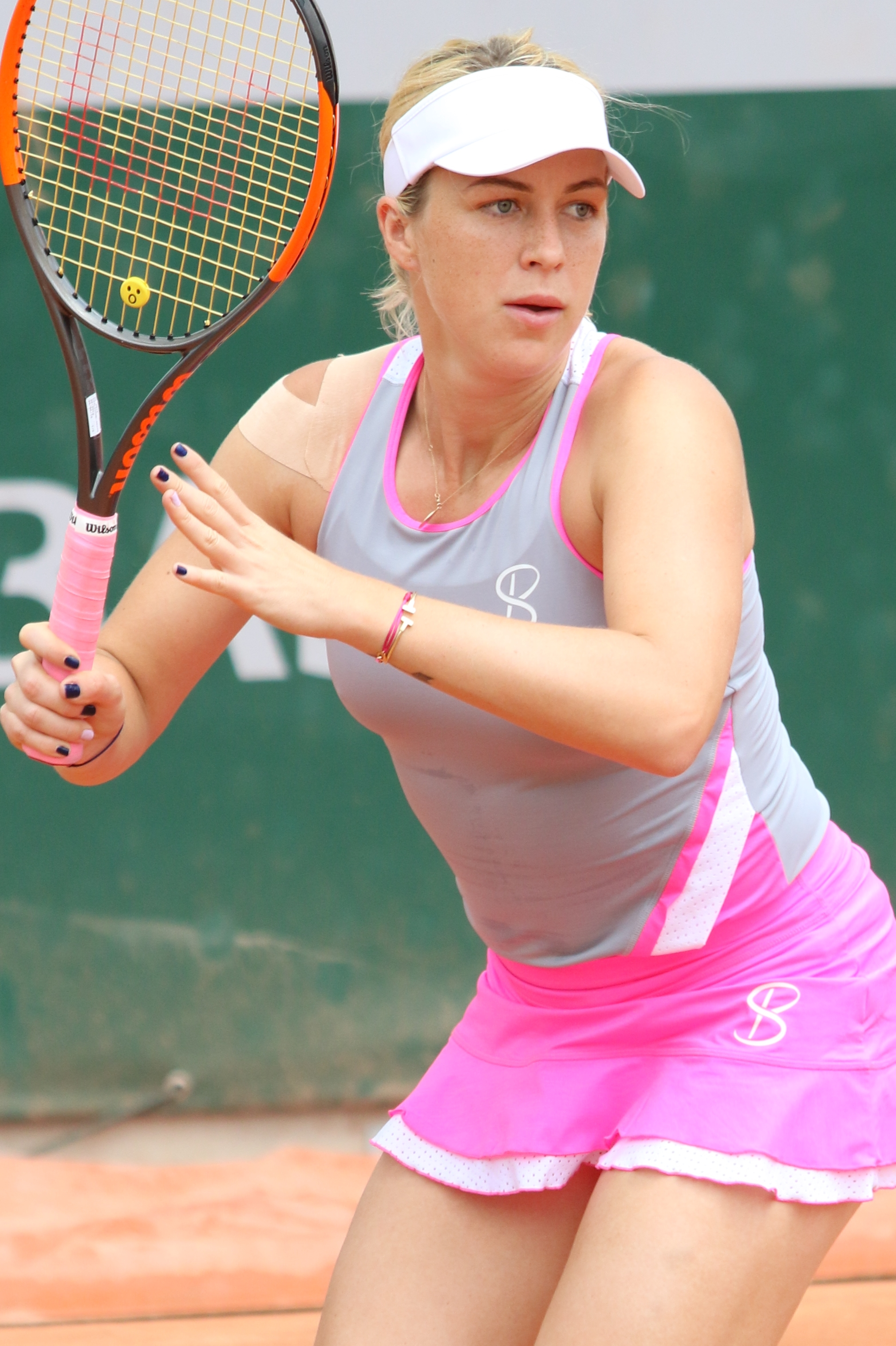
Pavlyuchenkova at the 2018 French Open

After her resurgent year of 2017, Pavlyuchenkova endured a rough start to her 2018 season. Across six tournament appearances in the first three months of the year, she logged in just two wins, over Kateryna Kozlova and Aliaksandra Sasnovich, at the Australian Open and Miami Open, respectively. These results caused her to drop out of the top 20. Kicking off her clay-court season in Stuttgart, Pavlyuchenkova finally gained some momentum by making her first ever quarterfinal at the tournament, beating Madison Keys and second seed Garbiñe Muguruza, the latter by via retirement. There, she succumbed to Anett Kontaveit in three sets. She then lost her openers in Madrid and Rome, in the hands of Samantha Stosur and Keys, respectively. As a result, she fell out of the top 30 for the first time since 2015.

Pavlyuchenkova then soared into her first final of the year at the Internationaux de Strasbourg. Seeded third, she saw off the likes of Tatjana Maria, Natalia Vikhlyantseva, Zarina Diyas and top seed Ashleigh Barty en route. In the final, she came out on top in a three-set marathon final, with all sets going to a tiebreak, against fifth-seeded veteran Dominika Cibulková. Pavlyuchenkova called that match, which ended 6–7, 7–6, 7–6, after 215 minutes, "the most dramatic I ever played". At the French Open, she was eliminated in the second round by Stosur in straight sets. Pavlyuchenkova did not enjoy much success on grass, netting just one win across three tournaments on the surface, which includes an opening-round loss in Wimbledon to Hsieh Su-wei as well.

The following month, at the Rogers Cup, she fell in the second round to Simona Halep and in Cincinnati the following week, in the same round to Angelique Kerber. She was then upset by Rebecca Peterson in the first round of the US Open in three sets. She then lost in the second round of the Pan Pacific Open to Caroline Garcia despite having two match points. She then recorded her best result in four months by making the last eight in Wuhan, scoring wins over Anastasija Sevastova, Kiki Bertens and Petra Kvitová. There, she lost to Barty in three sets. The following week at the China Open, she succumbed in the first round to Sloane Stephens in an intense battle in three sets. She ended the season with back-to-back quarterfinal appearances, in Linz and Moscow, falling on both occasions to Russians Ekaterina Alexandrova and Daria Kasatkina, respectively. Pavlyuchenkova's results in 2018 saw her finish the year at world No. 42, her worst season finish in ten years and her first outside the top 30 since 2012.

=== 2019: Major quarters and two Premier finals ===
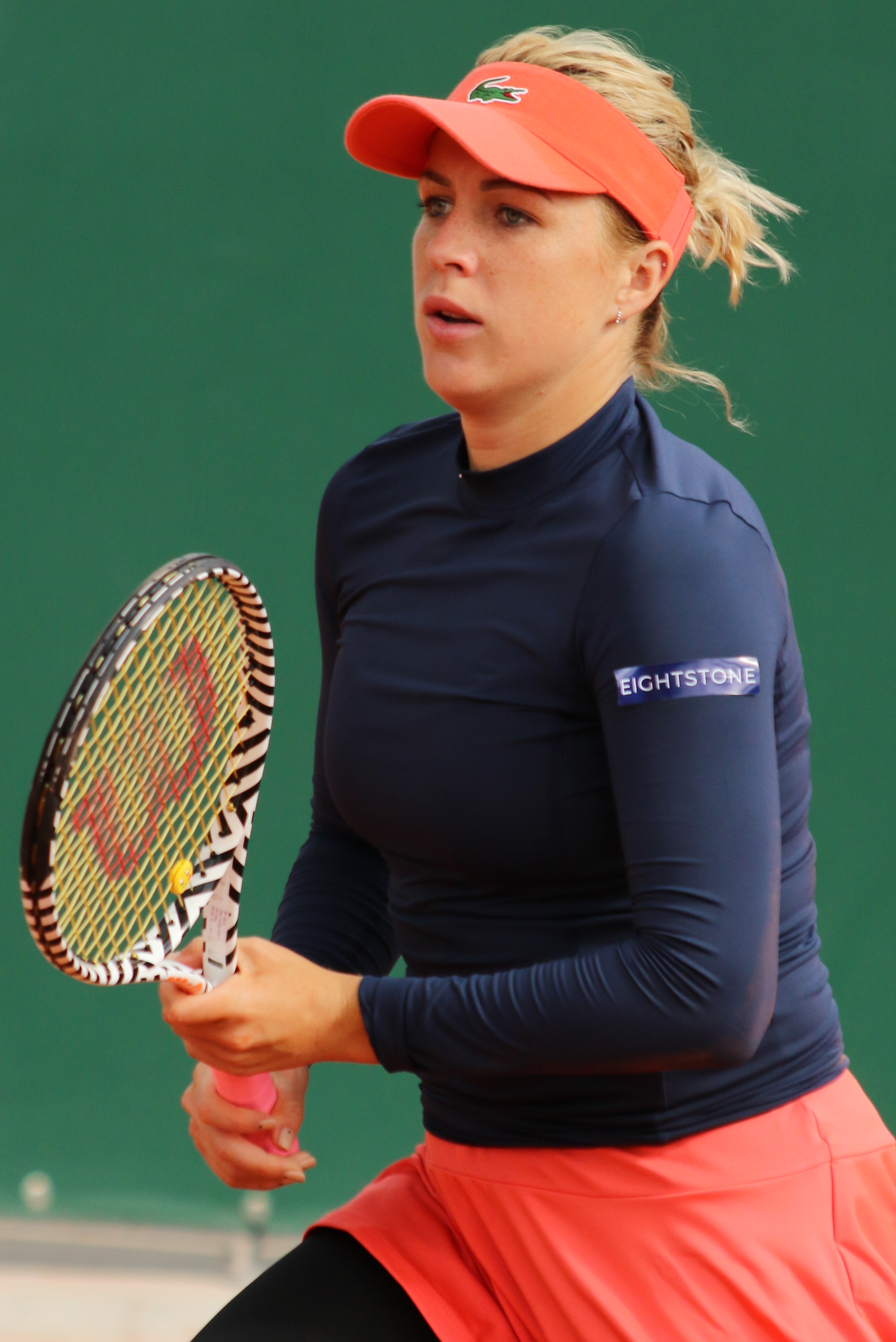
Pavlyuchenkova at the 2019 French Open

Pavlyuchenkova began the 2019 season with early exits at the Shenzhen Open and the Hobart International, losing to a pair of youngsters in Veronika Kudermetova and Vera Lapko, respectively. Unseeded at the Australian Open, she began her campaign with a victory over Monica Puig. She then came from a set down to upset ninth seed Kiki Bertens, before defeating Aliaksandra Sasnovich to reach the round of 16. There, she came from a set and a break down to upset fifth seed Sloane Stephens and thus, earned herself a berth in her fifth Grand Slam quarterfinal, where she faced first-time major quarterfinalist Danielle Collins. Despite having won the opening set comfortably, Pavlyuchenkova was upset by the American player in the end. Pavlyuchenkova followed up that result with a quarterfinal showing in St. Petersburg where she lost to eventual champion Bertens, in three sets.

Pavlyuchenkova then went on a three-match losing streak as she lost her openers in Dubai, Indian Wells and Miami. Seeded third in Monterrey, Pavlyuchenkova sauntered into the last eight with wins over Anna Blinkova and Ivana Jorović with a combined loss of just three games but there, she was eliminated by eventual runner-up Victoria Azarenka, in straight sets. On Fed Cup duty against Italy for a place in World Group II, Pavlyuchenkova won her singles matches over Jasmine Paolini and Martina Trevisan with the Russian team eventually winning the tie 4–0. She then lost in the second round at Stuttgart to Anett Kontaveit in straight sets, in a rematch of their quarterfinal clash here a year ago.

Pavlyuchenkova's form mid-season did not improve as she suffered a five-match losing streak after Stuttgart, which includes losses at the French Open and Wimbledon, resulting in her ranking falling out of the top 40 to as low as No. 46, her lowest ranking in more than 10 years. At the Rogers Cup, she scored her first win in more than three months, and her third over a top-ten player in 2019, when she defeated ninth seed Aryna Sabalenka in the first round but then lost to Jeļena Ostapenko. After falling to Zarina Diyas in qualifying at Cincinnati, Pavlyuchenkova scored her first win at the US Open since 2016 by beating Pauline Parmentier in the opening round but then lost to Bertens in straight sets.

Pavlyuchenkova started off the Asian swing by recording by her best result of the year by making the final of the Pan Pacific Open, her second at the tournament, defeating the likes of Dayana Yastremska, Bertens, Misaki Doi and Angelique Kerber en route, where she finished runner-up to Naomi Osaka. She was, however, unable to back up this result, falling early in her next three tournaments, with back-to-back defeats in the hands of Sofia Kenin in Wuhan and Beijing, and to Viktória Kužmová in Linz. She then bounced back by reaching her second final of the season at the Kremlin Cup, also her third at the tournament, by seeing off seventh seed Maria Sakkari, qualifier Varvara Gracheva, Kudermetova and Karolína Muchová en route. Against third seed Belinda Bencic in the final, despite having won the first set, Pavlyuchenkova succumbed to the Swiss in the end. Nevertheless, her turnaround in the back end of the year which saw her win ten of her fifteen matches after the US Open ensured her a top-30 season finish, at world No. 30.

=== 2020: Sixth major quarterfinal ===
Pavlyuchenkova began the 2020 season with early losses, once again. After losing against Kvitová from a set up in the opening round in Brisbane, she scored her first win of the year, in Adelaide over Anett Kontaveit in straight sets. She faced world No. 1, Ashleigh Barty, in the next round and lost despite having led by a set, again.

Seeded 30th at the Australian Open, she recorded straight-set wins over Nina Stojanović and Taylor Townsend in her first two matches. She then caused a huge upset by defeating second seed Karolína Plíšková in the third round, her first win in seven career meetings over the former world No. 1. She then came from a set down to defeat 2016 champion and 17th seeded Angelique Kerber to advance to the quarterfinals for the second year in a row, also her sixth major quarterfinal in total. There, she was defeated by eventual runner-up, Garbiñe Muguruza, in straight sets.

Pavlyuchenkova played one more tournament before the tour was suspended in March due to the COVID-19 pandemic, making the second round at the Dubai Championships after upsetting fourth seed and defending champion Belinda Bencic but there, she lost to Kontaveit. Returning to competition after the lifting of the suspension in August, at the Prague Open, a sixth-seeded Pavlyuchenkova dropped her opening match to Arantxa Rus. She then chose to skip the US Open due to safety concerns over the ongoing pandemic, which saw her streak of 48 consecutive Grand Slam tournament appearances, dating back to the 2008 French Open, come to an end.

The next month, Pavlyuchenkova competed at the Italian Open where she beat Zhang Shuai in her opening match but then lost to fourth seed Elina Svitolina, in straight sets. She then reached the second round in Strasbourg where she lost to Jil Teichmann. At her final tournament of the season, the French Open, Pavlyuchenkova made the second round after upsetting former champion and 28th seed Svetlana Kuznetsova, in three sets. There, however, she fell to Kateřina Siniaková in straight sets. She finished the year ranked 38, her third non-top 30 finish since 2009.

=== 2021: Singles major final, Olympic quarters and world No. 11 ===
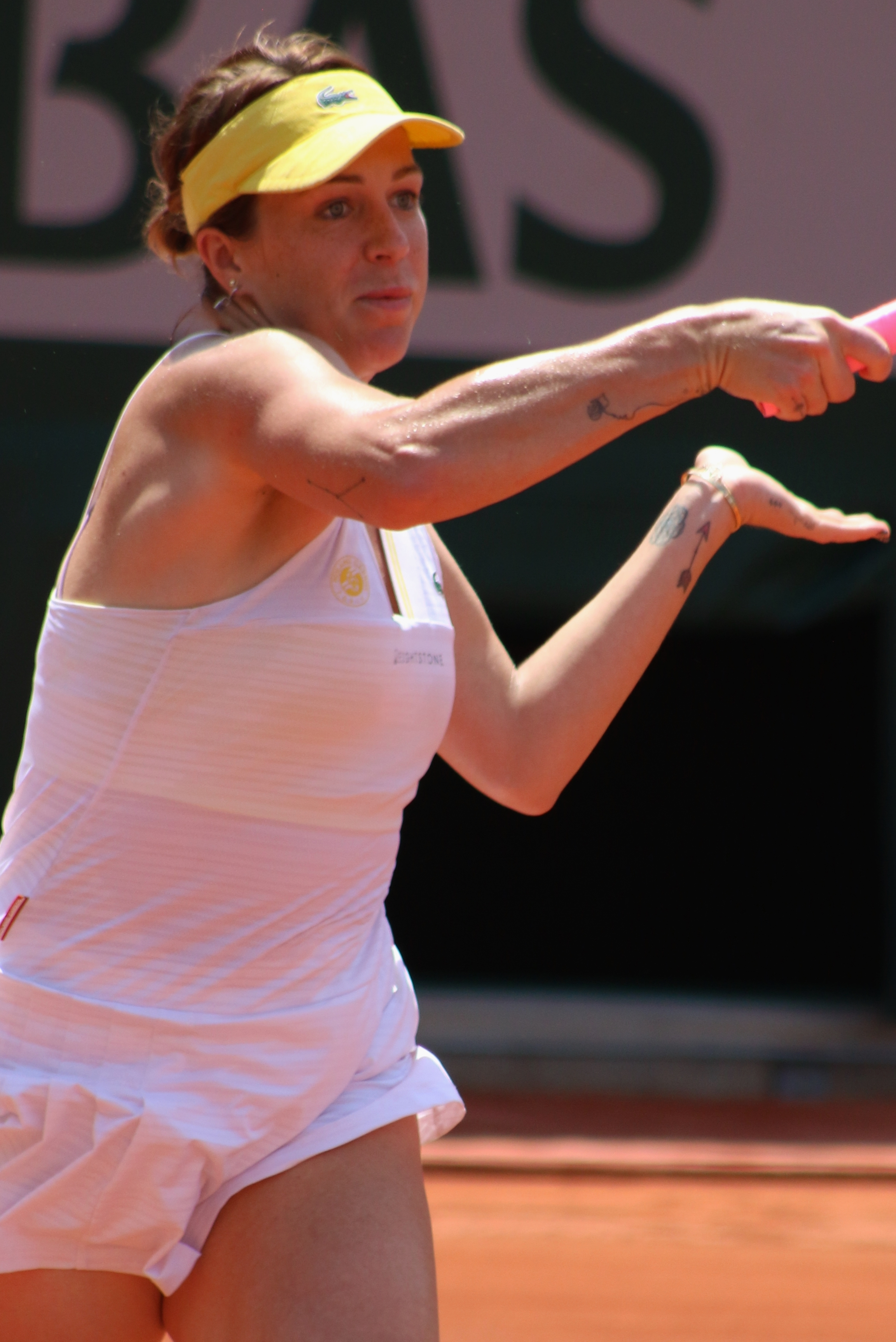
Pavlyuchenkova at the 2021 French Open

Pavlyuchenkova started her 2021 season in Abu Dhabi where she was beaten at the first hurdle by Ons Jabeur. She then scored straight-set wins over Misaki Doi and Anastasija Sevastova to reach the third round at the Yarra Valley Classic, losing to eventual finalist Garbiñe Muguruza. At the Australian Open, she lost in the first round to third seed and eventual champion Naomi Osaka. After that, Pavlyuchenkova competed at the Phillip Island Trophy and defeated Ajla Tomljanović in her opening match but then lost to eventual champion Daria Kasatkina in three sets. After a dry spell of two wins across four tournaments, Pavlyuchenkova rebounded at the Madrid Open by sealing her best result since the tour restart last August with a run to the semifinals, defeating Madison Keys, Karolína Plíšková, Jennifer Brady and Karolína Muchová. There, she was defeated by eventual champion Aryna Sabalenka in straight sets. It was Pavlyuchenkova's best showing at a WTA 1000 event since reaching the same stage at the Cincinnati Open in 2010, and her best at a Mandatory tournament since being a semifinalist at the 2009 Indian Wells Open, over 12 years ago.

At the French Open, Pavlyuchenkova was seeded 31st and moved into the second week for the first time since 2011 after seeing off Christina McHale and Tomljanović in the first two rounds, before following up with an upset win over third seed Sabalenka in three sets. She would progress further by coming back from a set down to beat 15th seed Victoria Azarenka to return to the last eight there for the first time since 2011, thus making it her seventh Grand Slam quarterfinal showing overall. There, ten years removed from her first quarterfinal at a Grand Slam tournament (where she then lost to defending champion and eventual runner-up Francesca Schiavone from a set and a break up), Pavlyuchenkova came back from a set down to prevail over 21st seed and doubles partner Elena Rybakina, winning 9–7 in the third set, thus advancing to the last four of a major for the first time in her career. In the semifinals, Pavlyuchenkova recorded her first straight-set win in four matches by beating fellow major semifinal debutante Tamara Zidanšek to reach her first major final, doing so on her 52nd overall appearance in the main draw of majors, a new record. In the championship match, Pavlyuchenkova lost to fellow Grand Slam tournament debutante Barbora Krejčíková in three sets, making it her first runner-up finish on clay. Her run in Paris this fortnight, however, put her back in the top 20 rankings, for the first time since 2018.

In June, at the grass-court warm-up event in Eastbourne, eighth seed Pavlyuchenkova lost in the first round to eventual champion Jeļena Ostapenko, in straight sets. Seeded 16th at Wimbledon, Pavlyuchenkova recorded back-to-back wins there for the first time since 2016, defeating Ana Bogdan and Kristýna Plíšková, before falling in the third round to 19th seed Karolína Muchová. In her second appearance at the Summer Olympics, Pavlyuchenkova was the 13th seed in the singles tournament and advanced to her maiden Olympic quarterfinal, doing so with an Olympic record of seven games surrendered, as she saw off Sara Errani, Anna-Lena Friedsam, and Sara Sorribes Tormo. She was later defeated by the eventual gold medalist, for the second Olympics in a row, when she succumbed to ninth seed Belinda Bencic in three sets. In mixed doubles, Pavlyuchenkova tasted greater success. Partnering Andrey Rublev, the first-time pairing sailed to the final, and took home the gold medal over compatriots Aslan Karatsev and Elena Vesnina, after saving a match point.

Pavlyuchenkova entered the Canadian Open as the tenth seed and recorded a straight-set win over Caroline Garcia in the first round, but failed to move on past the second round, after losing to Jessica Pegula in three sets. At the US Open, Pavlyuchenkova recorded her best result there in ten years by making it to the second week here for the first time since 2011, with wins over Alison Riske, Anna Karolina Schmiedlova and Varvara Gracheva. In the fourth round, she lost to fourth seed Karolína Plíšková in straight sets. The subsequent four tournament appearances of Pavlyuchenkova saw her net just one quarterfinal result, with a run to the last eight on home soil, in Moscow, where she lost to Markéta Vondroušová, besides taking a loss in the hands of youngster Leylah Fernandez in the third round of Indian Wells, despite having led by a set and a break in the latter. She finished her year by helping her nation claim its first Billie Jean King Cup in more than a decade, where the Russian Tennis Federation beat Switzerland in the final.

On 8 November, Pavlyuchenkova surpassed her prior 10-year-old career-high ranking of world No. 13 when she hit the No. 11 ranking, and subsequently concluded 2021 ranked the same, her career-best year-end ranking to date.

=== 2022: Injuries and WTA 1000 doubles title ===
She began 2022 season at the Australian Open, having missed the warm-up tournaments after contracting COVID-19 on arrival. She defeated Anna Bondár and Samantha Stosur to reach the third round, beating Stosur in her last career singles match. However, she was beaten by Sorana Cîrstea in three sets.

She was scheduled to compete at the St. Petersburg Trophy, but withdrew due to a knee injury. Pavlyuchenkova later announced that she would be ruled out of action for ten weeks due to her knee injury, and would be back in late April in time for the clay-court season.

At the Italian Open, partnering Veronika Kudermetova, she won her second WTA 1000 doubles title, after the one in Madrid in 2013, defeating Madrid champions Gabriela Dabrowski and Giuliana Olmos.

Pavlyuchenkova subsequently ended her season, after withdrawing from the French Open to continue nursing the knee injury. Having been defending her runner-up result from 12 months ago, her ranking dove nearly four-fold, from world No. 21 to No. 83 after the tournament's conclusion – making it the first time she is ranked outside the top 50, since she debuted here more than 13 years ago, on 3 November 2008.

=== 2023–24: Comeback, French Open quarters and 500th win ===
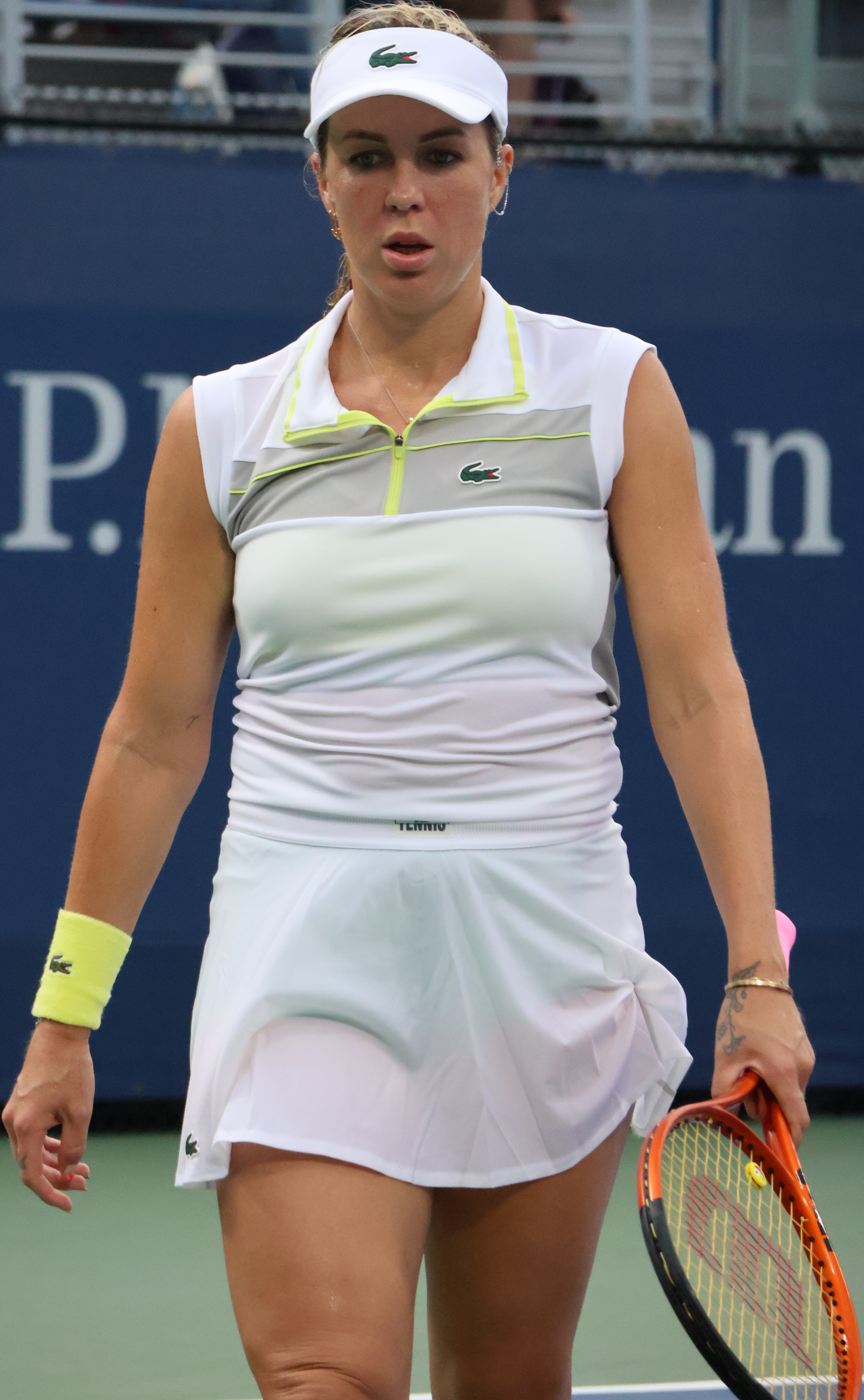
Pavlyuchenkova at the 2023 US Open

Pavlyuchenkova came back at the 2023 Australian Open with a protected ranking in singles. In doubles, she partnered Wimbledon champion Elena Rybakina and reached the third round, defeating the fifth-seeded pair of Ukrainian Lyudmyla Kichenok and Latvian Jeļena Ostapenko en route.

Using her protected ranking at the Italian Open, she won her first round match against wildcard Sara Errani but lost to top seed Iga Świątek in the second round by a double bagel in a little over an hour match.

Ranked No. 333, Pavlyuchenkova reached the fourth round at the French Open. Her scalps included the likes of Czech youngster Linda Fruhvirtová, followed by a pair of compatriots in 15th seed Liudmila Samsonova and 24th seed Anastasia Potapova – the latter two in three sets. As such, she became the second-lowest ranked player to reach the last 16 here in the Open Era following Serena Williams, who was ranked No. 451 when she made that same stage in 2018. Next, she defeated 28th seed Elise Mertens to reach her eighth major quarterfinal and her third at the French Open. She became only the third player ranked outside the top 250 to reach a major quarterfinal, after Martina Hingis at the 2006 Australian Open and Kaia Kanepi at the 2017 US Open.

The following year, at the Miami Open, she recorded her 500th career win over Shelby Rogers, making her the sixth Russian woman to achieve the milestone after Kuznetsova, Sharapova, Dementieva, Petrova and Zvonareva.

Later that year, Pavlyuchenkova reached the quarterfinals at the Cincinnati Open, recording her 39th top 10 career win over seventh seed Zheng Qinwen, making her the female player with most top 10 wins in the WTA that has not been ranked in the top 10, and her 17th win at a WTA 1000 level the most of any player who has never won a WTA 1000 title, since the format introduction in 2009. It was her first quarterfinal in Cincinnati since 2015, the nine seasons between the two being the longest gap between consecutive quarterfinal appearances in the event's history. She fell in the last eight to Paula Badosa.

=== 2025–26: Australian Open and Wimbledon quarters, hiatus ===
Seeded 27th, Pavlyuchenkova reached the quarterfinals at the Australian Open with wins over Yuan Yue, Anastasia Potapova, Laura Siegemund. and 18th seed Donna Vekić. She lost in the last eight to world No. 1, Aryna Sabalenka, in three sets.

In June at the Eastbourne Open, Pavlyuchenkova reached her first grass-court semifinal with wins over Viktoriya Tomova, Kimberly Birrell and Kamilla Rakhimova. She lost in the last four to Maya Joint.

At Wimbledon, Pavlyuchenkova defeated Ajla Tomljanović, 31st seed Ashlyn Krueger, Naomi Osaka and Sonay Kartal to make it through to her tenth major quarterfinal, at which point her run was ended by 13th seed Amanda Anisimova. As a result of her Wimbledon run, Pavlyuchenkova moved up to world No. 30 on 14 July.

== Endorsements ==
As of 2021, her clothing sponsor was Lacoste, and her racquet sponsor is Wilson. She endorsed the Wilson Burn range of racquets.

== Politics ==
In February 2022, she condemned the Russian invasion of Ukraine, saying "personal ambitions or political motives cannot justify violence".

She did not compete in the 2022 Wimbledon Championships due to the All England Club's decision to ban Russian and Belarusian players, in response to the Russian invasion of Ukraine.

In July 2023, she was among the Russian and Belarusian players that were not allowed to enter the Czech Republic ahead of the 2023 Prague Open. They competed as neutrals, without any national flag or symbol, but the Czech government passed a resolution banning all Russian and Belarusian athletes from entering the country due to the war in Ukraine.

== Career statistics ==
=== Grand Slam performance timelines ===
Key
W	F	SF	QF	#R	RR	Q#	P#	DNQ	A	Z#	PO	G	S	B	NMS	NTI	P	NH

(W) winner; (F) finalist; (SF) semifinalist; (QF) quarterfinalist; (#R) rounds 4, 3, 2, 1; (RR) round-robin stage; (Q#) qualification round; (P#) preliminary round; (DNQ) did not qualify; (A) absent; (Z#) Davis/Fed Cup Zonal Group (with number indication) or (PO) play-off; (G) gold, (S) silver or (B) bronze Olympic/Paralympic medal; (NMS) not a Masters tournament; (NTI) not a Tier I tournament; (P) postponed; (NH) not held; (SR) strike rate (events won / competed); (W–L) win–loss record.
To avoid confusion and double counting, these charts are updated at the conclusion of a tournament or when the player's participation has ended.

==== Singles ====
Tournament	2007	2008	2009	2010	2011	2012	2013	2014	2015	2016	2017	2018	2019	2020	2021	2022	2023	2024	2025	2026	SR	W–L	Win %
Australian Open	Q3	Q2	1R	2R	3R	2R	1R	3R	1R	1R	QF	2R	QF	QF	1R	3R	1R	2R	QF	1R	0 / 18	26–18	59%
French Open	A	2R	3R	3R	QF	3R	2R	2R	1R	3R	2R	2R	1R	2R	F	A	QF	2R	1R	A	0 / 17	29–17	63%
Wimbledon	1R	3R	2R	3R	2R	2R	1R	1R	2R	QF	1R	1R	1R	NH	3R	A	A	2R	QF	A	0 / 16	19–16	54%
US Open	Q2	2R	1R	4R	QF	2R	3R	2R	2R	3R	1R	1R	2R	A	4R	A	2R	3R	2R	A	0 / 16	23–16	59%
Win–Loss	0–1	4–3	3–4	8–4	11–4	5–4	3–4	4–4	2–4	8–4	5–4	2–4	5–4	5–2	11–4	2–1	5–3	5–4	9–4	0–1	0 / 67	97–67	59%

==== Doubles ====
Tournament	2008	2009	2010	2011	2012	2013	2014	2015	2016	2017	2018	2019	2020	2021	2022	2023	2024	2025	SR	W–L	Win%
Australian Open	A	1R	1R	1R	1R	QF	1R	3R	3R	3R	1R	1R	A	1R	A	3R	2R (Note: Withdrew during the tournament. Not counted as a loss.)	A	0 / 14	12–13	48%
French Open	A	3R	1R	2R	1R	QF	2R	2R	A	3R	2R	1R	2R	QF	A	A	1R	2R	0 / 14	16–14	53%
Wimbledon	A	2R	3R	1R	1R	1R	QF	3R	A	A	1R	A	NH	1R	A	A	A	A	0 / 9	8–9	47%
US Open	1R	1R	2R	2R	1R	3R	2R	QF	A	3R	QF	3R	A	A	A	1R	3R	1R	0 / 13	17–13	57%
Win–Loss	0–1	3–4	3–4	2–4	0–4	8–4	5–4	8–4	2–1	6–3	4–4	2–3	1–1	3–3	0–0	2–2	3–2	1–1	0 / 50	53–49	52%

=== Grand Slam tournament finals ===
==== Singles: 1 (runner-up) ====
Result	Year	Championship	Surface	Opponent	Score
Loss	2021	French Open	Clay	(Czech Republic) Barbora Krejčíková	1–6, 6–2, 4–6

=== Olympic finals ===
==== Mixed doubles: 1 (gold medal) ====
Outcome	Year	Tournament	Surface	Partner	Opponents	Score
Gold	2021	2020 Tokyo Olympics	Hard	(Russia) Andrey Rublev	(Russia) Elena Vesnina (Russia) Aslan Karatsev	6–3, 6–7^{(5–7)}, [13–11]

== Awards and honours ==
International

- ITF Junior World Champion: 2006.

National

- The Russian Cup in the nominations:
  - Progress of the Year: 2006;
  - Female Player of the Year: 2021;
  - Olympians-2020;
  - Team of the Year: 2015, 2021.
- Sports title "Merited Master of Sports of Russia" (6 August 2021).
- Order of Friendship (11 August 2021).

== See also ==
- Performance timelines for all female tennis players since 1978 who reached at least one Grand Slam final

Awards and achievements
Preceded by (Belarus) Victoria Azarenka	ITF Junior World Champion; 2006	Succeeded by (Poland) Urszula Radwańska
