= 2013 Nürnberger Versicherungscup – Singles =

Singles
- 2013 Nürnberger Versicherungscup

Final
- Champion: (Romania) Simona Halep
- Runner-up: (Germany) Andrea Petkovic
- Score: 6–3, 6–3

Details
- Draw: 32
- Seeds: 8

Events
Singles	Doubles
Nürnberger Versicherungscup	· 2014 →

In the first edition of the tournament, Simona Halep defeated wild card Andrea Petkovic in the final, 6–3, 6–3, to claim her first WTA singles title.

== Seeds ==
1. (Serbia) Jelena Janković (semifinals)
2. (Czech Republic) Klára Zakopalová (first round)
3. (France) Alizé Cornet (second round)
4. (Germany) Julia Görges (second round)
5. (Czech Republic) Lucie Šafářová (semifinals)
6. (Spain) Lourdes Domínguez Lino (quarterfinals)
7. (Romania) Simona Halep (champion)
8. (Germany) Annika Beck (quarterfinals)

== Draw ==
=== Key ===
- Q = Qualifier
- WC = Wild card
- LL = Lucky loser
- Alt = Alternate
- ITF = ITF entry
- PR = Protected ranking
- SR = Special ranking
- SE = Special exempt
- JE = Junior exempt
- JR = Junior Accelerator Programme entrant
- CO = College Accelerator Programme entrant
- NG = Next Gen Accelerator Program entrant
- w/o = Walkover
- r = Retired
- d = Defaulted

=== Finals ===
Semifinals
1/WC	(Serbia) Jelena Janković	4	3
WC	(Germany) Andrea Petkovic	6	6
7	(Romania) Simona Halep	6	0	6
5	(Czech Republic) Lucie Šafářová	3	6	2

Final
WC	(Germany) Andrea Petkovic	3	3
7	(Romania) Simona Halep	6	6

=== Top half ===
First round
1/WC	(Serbia) J Janković	6	6
(Netherlands) A Rus	4	2
(Sweden) J Larsson	6	6^{3}	7
LL	(Ukraine) Y Beygelzimer	3	7^{7}	5
(Luxembourg) M Minella	7	4	6
(United States) J Pegula	5	6	3
(Colombia) M Duque	5	3
6	(Spain) L Domínguez Lino	7	6
4	(Germany) J Görges	6	7
(Romania) A Cadanțu	4	5
WC	(Germany) A Petkovic	6	6
(Sweden) S Arvidsson	3	2
(Italy) K Knapp	2	7^{7}	7
WC	(Germany) D Pfizenmaier	6	6^{0}	5
(Russia) N Bratchikova	2	2
8	(Germany) A Beck	6	6

Second round
1/WC	(Serbia) J Janković	6	6
(Sweden) J Larsson	2	0
(Luxembourg) M Minella	1	4
6	(Spain) L Domínguez Lino	6	6
4	(Germany) J Görges	1	5
WC	(Germany) A Petkovic	6	7
(Italy) K Knapp	4	2
8	(Germany) A Beck	6	6

Quarterfinals
1/WC	(Serbia) J Janković	6	6
6	(Spain) L Domínguez Lino	4	0
WC	(Germany) A Petkovic	4	6	7
8	(Germany) A Beck	6	3	5

Semifinals
1/WC	(Serbia) J Janković	4	3
WC	(Germany) A Petkovic	6	6

=== Bottom half ===
First round
7	(Romania) S Halep	6	7
Q	(United States) G Min	0	5
(Spain) E Cabeza Candela	6	6
Q	(Czech Republic) T Martincová	2	3
Q	(Russia) A Panova	2	2
(Kazakhstan) G Voskoboeva	6	6
(France) P Parmentier	3	4
3	(France) A Cornet	6	6
5	(Czech Republic) L Šafářová	6	7^{11}
(Kazakhstan) S Karatantcheva	2	6^{9}
(Spain) MT Torró Flor	4	6	6
(Brazil) T Pereira	6	4	4
Q	(Czech Republic) T Smitková	6^{2}	3
(United States) J Cohen	7^{7}	6
(Slovenia) P Hercog	6	4	6
2	(Czech Republic) K Zakopalová	3	6	1

Second round
7	(Romania) S Halep	6	6
(Spain) E Cabeza Candela	2	1
(Kazakhstan) G Voskoboeva	2	6	6
3	(France) A Cornet	6	3	3
5	(Czech Republic) L Šafářová	6	6
(Spain) MT Torró Flor	4	2
(United States) J Cohen	3	3
(Slovenia) P Hercog	6	6

Quarterfinals
7	(Romania) S Halep	6	6
(Kazakhstan) G Voskoboeva	4	1
5	(Czech Republic) L Šafářová	7^{7}	3	6
(Slovenia) P Hercog	6^{5}	6	4

Semifinals
7	(Romania) S Halep	6	0	6
5	(Czech Republic) L Šafářová	3	6	2

== Qualifying ==
=== Seeds ===
1. (Serbia) Aleksandra Krunić (second round)
2. (Ukraine) Maryna Zanevska (first round)
3. (Russia) Valeria Solovyeva (first round)
4. (Germany) Anna-Lena Friedsam (second round)
5. (Russia) Alexandra Panova (qualified)
6. (United States) Chiara Scholl (first round)
7. (Ukraine) Olga Savchuk (first round; retired)
8. (Ukraine) Yuliya Beygelzimer (qualifying competition; lucky loser)

=== Qualifiers ===
1. (United States) Grace Min
2. (Russia) Alexandra Panova
3. (Czech Republic) Tereza Martincová
4. (Czech Republic) Tereza Smitková

=== Lucky losers ===
1. (Ukraine) Yuliya Beygelzimer

=== Qualifying draw ===
==== First qualifier ====
First round
1	(Serbia) Aleksandra Krunić	7^{7}	6
(Ukraine) Lyudmyla Kichenok	6^{1}	0
(United States) Grace Min	6	7^{7}
(Bosnia and Herzegovina) Mervana Jugić-Salkić	1	6^{4}
WC	(Germany) Nina Zander	5	4
(Germany) Kristina Barrois	7	6
(Venezuela) Andrea Gámiz	3	0
8	(Ukraine) Yuliya Beygelzimer	6	6

Second round
1	(Serbia) Aleksandra Krunić	4	4
(United States) Grace Min	6	6
(Germany) Kristina Barrois	2	6^{1}
8	(Ukraine) Yuliya Beygelzimer	6	7^{7}

Qualifying competition
(United States) Grace Min	6	7
8	(Ukraine) Yuliya Beygelzimer	3	5

==== Second qualifier ====
First round
2	(Ukraine) Maryna Zanevska	2	2
(Russia) Marina Melnikova	6	6
(United States) Jill Craybas	6	7
(Poland) Magda Linette	4	5
(Germany) Anna Zaja	4	0
(Germany) Anne Schäfer	6	6
(Australia) Monique Adamczak	3	2
5	(Russia) Alexandra Panova	6	6

Second round
(Russia) Marina Melnikova	6	6^{5}	6
(United States) Jill Craybas	4	7^{7}	2
(Germany) Anne Schäfer	2	1
5	(Russia) Alexandra Panova	6	6

Qualifying competition
(Russia) Marina Melnikova	6^{4}	4
5	(Russia) Alexandra Panova	7^{7}	6

==== Third qualifier ====
First round
3	(Russia) Valeria Solovyeva	0	1
(Poland) Katarzyna Kawa	6	6
WC	(Germany) Vivian Heisen	3	1
(Czech Republic) Kateřina Kramperová	6	6
(Czech Republic) Tereza Martincová	6	7^{7}
(Romania) Raluca Olaru	2	6^{2}
(Latvia) Diāna Marcinkēviča	6	6
6	(United States) Chiara Scholl	3	3

Second round
(Poland) Katarzyna Kawa	4	6	6
(Czech Republic) Kateřina Kramperová	6	1	4
(Czech Republic) Tereza Martincová	2	7	6
(Latvia) Diāna Marcinkēviča	6	5	4

Qualifying competition
(Poland) Katarzyna Kawa	5	6^{1}
(Czech Republic) Tereza Martincová	7	7^{7}

==== Fourth qualifier ====
First round
4	(Germany) Anna-Lena Friedsam	6	6^{10}	6
(Bulgaria) Dia Evtimova	4	7^{12}	3
(Poland) Katarzyna Piter	1	4
(Czech Republic) Tereza Smitková	6	6
(Germany) Carina Witthöft	4	3
(Germany) Justine Ozga	6	6
(Switzerland) Lara Michel	6	0
7	(Ukraine) Olga Savchuk	1	0^{r}

Second round
4	(Germany) Anna-Lena Friedsam	6^{4}	4
(Czech Republic) Tereza Smitková	7^{7}	6
(Germany) Justine Ozga	4	7^{10}	5
(Switzerland) Lara Michel	6	6^{8}	7

Qualifying competition
(Czech Republic) Tereza Smitková	6	6
(Switzerland) Lara Michel	4	2
