= 2014 Nürnberger Versicherungscup – Doubles =

Doubles
- 2014 Nürnberger Versicherungscup
- 2013 Champions: (Romania) Raluca Olaru (Russia) Valeria Solovyeva

Final
- Champions: (Netherlands) Michaëlla Krajicek (Czech Republic) Karolína Plíšková
- Runners-up: (Romania) Raluca Olaru (Israel) Shahar Pe'er
- Score: 6–0, 4–6, [10–6]

Details
- Draw: 16
- Seeds: 4

Events
Singles	Doubles
← 2013 ·	Nürnberger Versicherungscup	· 2015 →

Raluca Olaru and Valeria Solovyeva were the defending champions, but Solovyeva chose not to participate. Olaru played alongside Shahar Pe'er.

Michaëlla Krajicek and Karolína Plíšková won the title, defeating Olaru and Pe'er in the final, 6–0, 4–6, [10–6].

== Seeds ==
1. (United States) Liezel Huber / (United States) Lisa Raymond (semifinals)
2. (New Zealand) Marina Erakovic / (Spain) Arantxa Parra Santonja (first round)
3. (Japan) Shuko Aoyama / (Austria) Sandra Klemenschits (quarterfinals)
4. (Georgia (country)) Oksana Kalashnikova / (Poland) Katarzyna Piter (quarterfinals)

== Draw ==
=== Key ===
- Q = Qualifier
- WC = Wild card
- LL = Lucky loser
- Alt = Alternate
- ITF = ITF entry
- PR = Protected ranking
- SR = Special ranking
- SE = Special exempt
- JE = Junior exempt
- JR = Junior Accelerator Programme entrant
- CO = College Accelerator Programme entrant
- NG = Next Gen Accelerator Program entrant
- w/o = Walkover
- r = Retired
- d = Defaulted

=== Draw ===
First round
1	(United States) L Huber (United States) L Raymond	6	6
(United States) N Melichar (United States) N Pluskota	0	1
(Germany) K Barrois (Greece) E Daniilidou	6	4	[10]
(Venezuela) A Gámiz (Spain) B García Vidagany	1	6	[7]
4	(Georgia (country)) O Kalashnikova (Poland) K Piter	6	6
(Belarus) P Pekhova (Germany) N Zander	4	0
(Netherlands) M Krajicek (Czech Republic) Ka Plíšková	6	6
WC	(Austria) Y Meusburger (Liechtenstein) K von Deichmann	3	4
(Russia) M Melnikova (Serbia) T Mirčić	6^{5}	5
(Japan) K Date-Krumm (France) C Garcia	7^{7}	7
(Bulgaria) D Evtimova (Brazil) L Pigossi	6^{6}	5
3	(Japan) S Aoyama (Austria) S Klemenschits	7^{8}	7
(Belarus) I Kremen (Croatia) A Vrljić	0	5
(Romania) R Olaru (Israel) S Pe'er	6	7
(Germany) A-L Grönefeld (Germany) A Lottner	6	6
2	(New Zealand) M Erakovic (Spain) A Parra Santonja	2	2

Quarterfinals
1	(United States) L Huber (United States) L Raymond	6	6
(Germany) K Barrois (Greece) E Daniilidou	2	4
4	(Georgia (country)) O Kalashnikova (Poland) K Piter	4	6^{7}
(Netherlands) M Krajicek (Czech Republic) Ka Plíšková	6	7^{9}
(Japan) K Date-Krumm (France) C Garcia	7^{7}	6
3	(Japan) S Aoyama (Austria) S Klemenschits	6^{2}	2
(Romania) R Olaru (Israel) S Pe'er	6	6
(Germany) A-L Grönefeld (Germany) A Lottner	4	3

Semifinals
1	(United States) L Huber (United States) L Raymond	2	6^{7}
(Netherlands) M Krajicek (Czech Republic) Ka Plíšková	6	7^{9}
(Japan) K Date-Krumm (France) C Garcia	2	2
(Romania) R Olaru (Israel) S Pe'er	6	6

Final
(Netherlands) M Krajicek (Czech Republic) Ka Plíšková	6	4	[10]
(Romania) R Olaru (Israel) S Pe'er	0	6	[6]
