= 2014 Nürnberger Versicherungscup =

- Date: 18–24 May 2014
- Edition: 2nd
- Category: WTA International
- Draw: 32S / 16D
- Prize money: $250,000
- Surface: Clay / outdoor
- Location: Nuremberg, Germany
- Venue: Tennis-Club 1. FC Nürnberg

Champions

Singles
- (Canada) Eugenie Bouchard

Doubles
- (Netherlands) Michaëlla Krajicek / (Czech Republic) Karolína Plíšková
← 2013 ·	Nürnberger Versicherungscup	· 2015 →

The 2014 Nürnberger Versicherungscup was a professional women's tennis tournament played on outdoor clay courts. It was the second edition of the tournament, and part of the WTA International tier of the 2014 WTA Tour. It took place at the Tennis-Club 1. FC Nürnberg in Nuremberg, Germany, from 18 May until 24 May 2014. Second-seeded Eugenie Bouchard won the singles title.

== Finals ==
=== Singles ===
(Canada) Eugenie Bouchard defeated (Czech Republic) Karolína Plíšková 6–2, 4–6, 6–3

- It was Bouchard's only singles title of her career.

=== Doubles ===
(Netherlands) Michaëlla Krajicek / (Czech Republic) Karolína Plíšková defeated (Romania) Raluca Olaru / (Israel) Shahar Pe'er 6–0, 4–6, [10–6]

- It was Krajicek's only doubles title of the year and the 5th and last of her career. It was Plíšková's 1st doubles title of the year and the 2nd of her career.

== Points and prize money ==
=== Point distribution ===
Event	W	F	SF	QF	Round of 16	Round of 32	Q	Q3	Q2	Q1
Singles	280	180	110	60	30	1	18	14	10	1
Doubles	280	180	110	60	1	—	—	—	—	—

=== Prize money ===
Event	W	F	SF	QF	Round of 16	Round of 32	Q3	Q2	Q1
Singles	€34,677	€17,258	€9,113	€4,758	€2,669	€1,552	€810	€589	€427
Doubles	€9,919	€5,161	€2,770	€1,468	€774	—	—	—	—

== Singles main draw entrants ==
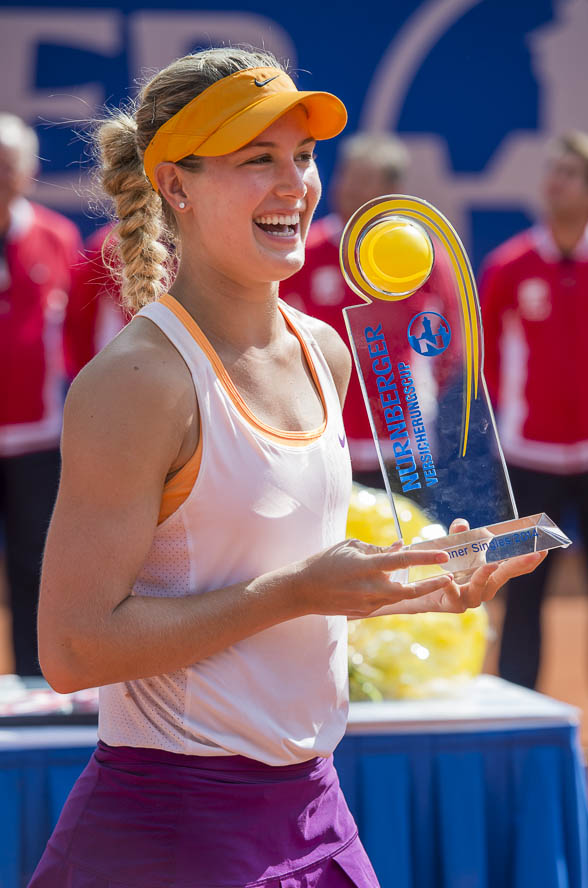
Singles champion, Eugenie Bouchard

=== Seeds ===
Country	Player	Rank^{1}	Seed
GER	Angelique Kerber	9	1
CAN	Eugenie Bouchard	20	2
CZE	Klára Koukalová	30	3
UKR	Elina Svitolina	38	4
AUT	Yvonne Meusburger	40	5
JPN	Kurumi Nara	45	6
FRA	Caroline Garcia	46	7
GER	Annika Beck	48	8

- ^{1} Rankings as of 12 May 2014

=== Other entrants ===
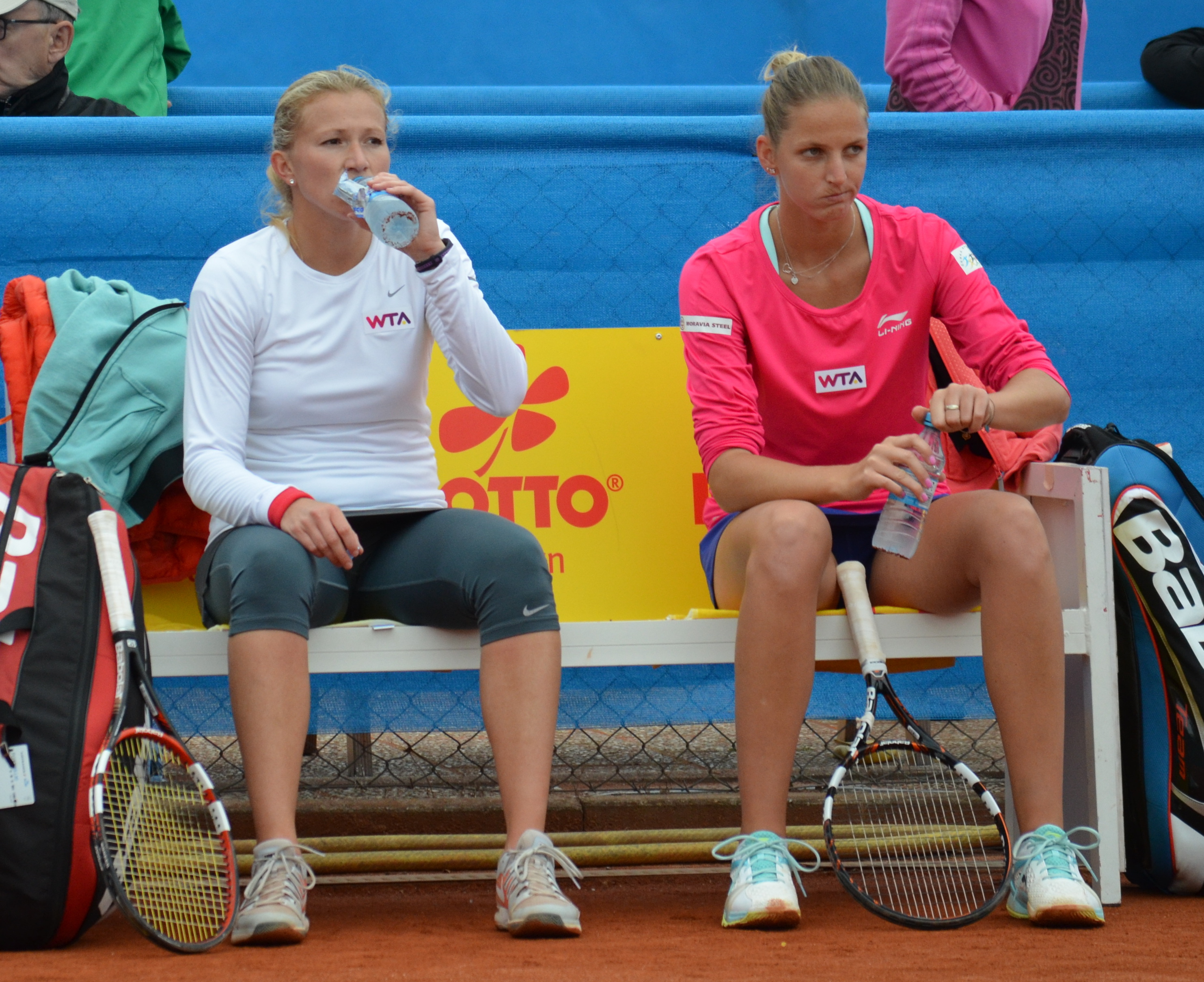
Doubles champions, Michaëlla Krajicek and Karolína Plíšková

The following players received wildcards into the singles main draw:

- (Germany) Anna-Lena Friedsam
- (Germany) Antonia Lottner
- (Austria) Lisa-Maria Moser

The following players received entry from the qualifying draw:

- (Spain) Beatriz García Vidagany
- (Israel) Julia Glushko
- (Australia) Anastasia Rodionova
- (Germany) Nina Zander

The following players received entry into the singles main draw as lucky losers:

- (Paraguay) Montserrat González
- (Czech Republic) Tereza Martincová

=== Withdrawals ===
Before the tournament

- (Spain) Lourdes Domínguez Lino → replaced by (Germany) Mona Barthel
- (Spain) Garbiñe Muguruza → replaced by (Switzerland) Belinda Bencic
- (Slovakia) Anna Karolína Schmiedlová (right shoulder injury) → replaced by (Czech Republic) Tereza Martincová
- (Italy) Roberta Vinci → replaced by (Paraguay) Montserrat González

== Doubles main draw entrants ==
=== Seeds ===
Country	Player	Country	Player	Rank^{1}	Seed
USA	Liezel Huber	USA	Lisa Raymond	69	1
NZL	Marina Erakovic	ESP	Arantxa Parra Santonja	82	2
JPN	Shuko Aoyama	AUT	Sandra Klemenschits	96	3
GEO	Oksana Kalashnikova	POL	Katarzyna Piter	115	4

- ^{1} Rankings as of 12 May 2014

=== Other entrants ===
The following pair received a wildcard into the doubles main draw:

- (Austria) Yvonne Meusburger / (Liechtenstein) Kathinka von Deichmann
