= 2013 Nürnberger Versicherungscup =

- Date: 10–15 June 2013
- Edition: 1st
- Category: WTA International
- Draw: 32S / 16D
- Prize money: $235,000
- Surface: Clay / outdoor
- Location: Nuremberg, Germany
- Venue: Tennis-Club 1. FC Nürnberg

Champions

Singles
- (Romania) Simona Halep

Doubles
- (Romania) Raluca Olaru / (Russia) Valeria Solovyeva
| Nürnberger Versicherungscup | · 2014 → |

The 2013 Nürnberger Versicherungscup was a professional women's tennis tournament played on outdoor clay courts. It was the first edition of the tournament which was part of the WTA International tier of the 2013 WTA Tour. It took place at the Tennis-Club 1. FC Nürnberg in Nuremberg, Germany from 10 June until 15 June 2013. Seventh-seeded Simona Halep won the singles title.

== Finals ==
=== Singles ===
(Romania) Simona Halep defeated (Germany) Andrea Petkovic, 6–3, 6–3

- It was Halep's 1st singles title of her career.

=== Doubles ===
(Romania) Raluca Olaru / (Russia) Valeria Solovyeva defeated (Germany) Anna-Lena Grönefeld / (Czech Republic) Květa Peschke, 2–6, 7–6^{(7–3)}, [11–9]

- It was Olaru's only doubles title of the year and the 3rd of her career. It was Solovyeva's only doubles title of the year and the 2nd and last of her career.

== Singles main draw entrants ==
=== Seeds ===
| Country | Player | Rank^{1} | Seed |
|---|---|---|---|
| SRB | Jelena Janković | 18 | 1 |
| CZE | Klára Zakopalová | 24 | 2 |
| FRA | Alizé Cornet | 27 | 3 |
| GER | Julia Görges | 28 | 4 |
| CZE | Lucie Šafářová | 29 | 5 |
| ESP | Lourdes Domínguez Lino | 45 | 6 |
| ROU | Simona Halep | 57 | 7 |
| GER | Annika Beck | 62 | 8 |

- ^{1} Rankings as of 27 May 2013

=== Other entrants ===
The following players received wildcards into the singles main draw:

- (Serbia) Jelena Janković
- (Germany) Andrea Petkovic
- (Germany) Dinah Pfizenmaier

The following players received entry from the qualifying draw:

- (Czech Republic) Tereza Martincová
- (United States) Grace Min
- (Russia) Alexandra Panova
- (Czech Republic) Tereza Smitková

The following player received entry as a lucky loser:

- (Ukraine) Yuliya Beygelzimer

=== Withdrawals ===
Before the tournament

- (Romania) Irina-Camelia Begu
- (Czech Republic) Lucie Hradecká
- (United States) Bethanie Mattek-Sands
- (Spain) Anabel Medina Garrigues
- (Romania) Monica Niculescu
- (Italy) Flavia Pennetta (leg injury)
- (South Africa) Chanelle Scheepers
- (Kazakhstan) Yaroslava Shvedova
- (Spain) Silvia Soler Espinosa
- (Spain) Carla Suárez Navarro

== Doubles main draw entrants ==
=== Seeds ===
| Country | Player | Country | Player | Rank^{1} | Seed |
|---|---|---|---|---|---|
| GER | Anna-Lena Grönefeld | CZE | Květa Peschke | 37 | 1 |
| GER | Julia Görges | LUX | Mandy Minella | 82 | 2 |
| RUS | Alexandra Panova | FRA | Laura Thorpe | 166 | 3 |
| CZE | Eva Birnerová | UKR | Irina Buryachok | 167 | 4 |

- ^{1} Rankings as of 27 May 2013

=== Other entrants ===
The following pairs received wildcards into the doubles main draw:

- (Germany) Kristina Barrois / (Germany) Anna-Lena Friedsam
- (Germany) Laura Siegemund / (Germany) Nina Zander
