= 2013 Nürnberger Versicherungscup – Doubles =

Doubles
- 2013 Nürnberger Versicherungscup

Final
- Champions: (Romania) Raluca Olaru (Russia) Valeria Solovyeva
- Runners-up: (Germany) Anna-Lena Grönefeld (Czech Republic) Květa Peschke
- Score: 2–6, 7–6^{(7–3)}, [11–9]

Details
- Draw: 16
- Seeds: 4

Events
Singles	Doubles
Nürnberger Versicherungscup	· 2014 →

Raluca Olaru and Valeria Solovyeva won the first edition of the tournament over first seeded Anna-Lena Grönefeld and Květa Peschke with the score 2–6, 7–6^{(7–3)}, [11–9].

== Seeds ==
1. (Germany) Anna-Lena Grönefeld / (Czech Republic) Květa Peschke (final)
2. (Germany) Julia Görges / (Luxembourg) Mandy Minella (first round)
3. (Russia) Alexandra Panova / (France) Laura Thorpe (quarterfinals)
4. (Czech Republic) Eva Birnerová / (Ukraine) Irina Buryachok (first round)

== Draw ==
=== Key ===
- Q = Qualifier
- WC = Wild card
- LL = Lucky loser
- Alt = Alternate
- ITF = ITF entry
- PR = Protected ranking
- SR = Special ranking
- SE = Special exempt
- JE = Junior exempt
- JR = Junior Accelerator Programme entrant
- CO = College Accelerator Programme entrant
- NG = Next Gen Accelerator Program entrant
- w/o = Walkover
- r = Retired
- d = Defaulted

=== Draw ===
First round
1	(Germany) A-L Grönefeld (Czech Republic) K Peschke	6	6
(Ukraine) Y Beygelzimer (Russia) N Bratchikova	1	2
(Ukraine) L Kichenok (Poland) M Linette	5	2
WC	(Germany) K Barrois (Germany) A-L Friedsam	7	6
3	(Russia) A Panova (France) L Thorpe	6	6
(United States) J Pegula (Thailand) P Plipuech	3	3
WC	(Germany) L Siegemund (Germany) N Zander	4	6^{3}
(Czech Republic) E Hrdinová (Argentina) M Irigoyen	6	7^{7}
(Colombia) M Duque (Brazil) T Pereira	6	4	[10]
(United States) J Craybas (Ukraine) O Savchuk	0	6	[8]
(Romania) R Olaru (Russia) V Solovyeva	6	6
4	(Czech Republic) E Birnerová (Ukraine) I Buryachok	2	2
(Austria) S Klemenschits (Slovenia) A Klepač	6	7^{7}
(United States) A Muhammed (United States) A Will	2	6^{4}
(Serbia) A Krunić (Poland) K Piter	6	6
2	(Germany) J Görges (Luxembourg) M Minella	1	2

Quarterfinals
1	(Germany) A-L Grönefeld (Czech Republic) K Peschke	6	7^{7}
WC	(Germany) K Barrois (Germany) A-L Friedsam	2	6^{5}
3	(Russia) A Panova (France) L Thorpe	4	7^{7}	[7]
(Czech Republic) E Hrdinová (Argentina) M Irigoyen	6	6^{4}	[10]
(Colombia) M Duque (Brazil) T Pereira	7^{7}	4	[6]
(Romania) R Olaru (Russia) V Solovyeva	6^{5}	6	[10]
(Austria) S Klemenschits (Slovenia) A Klepač	4	7	[5]
(Serbia) A Krunić (Poland) K Piter	6	5	[10]

Semifinals
1	(Germany) A-L Grönefeld (Czech Republic) K Peschke	6	6
(Czech Republic) E Hrdinová (Argentina) M Irigoyen	2	4
(Romania) R Olaru (Russia) V Solovyeva	6	6
(Serbia) A Krunić (Poland) K Piter	2	1

Final
1	(Germany) A-L Grönefeld (Czech Republic) K Peschke	6	6^{3}	[9]
(Romania) R Olaru (Russia) V Solovyeva	2	7^{7}	[11]
