= 2015 Nürnberger Versicherungscup – Doubles =

Doubles
- 2015 Nürnberger Versicherungscup

Final
- Champions: (Chinese Taipei) Chan Hao-ching (Spain) Anabel Medina Garrigues
- Runners-up: (Spain) Lara Arruabarrena (Romania) Raluca Olaru
- Score: 6–4, 7–6^{(7–5)}

Details
- Draw: 16
- Seeds: 4

Events
Singles	Doubles
← 2014 ·	Nürnberger Versicherungscup	· 2016 →

Michaëlla Krajicek and Karolína Plíšková were the defending champions, but chose not to participate this year.
Chan Hao-ching and Anabel Medina Garrigues won the title, defeating Lara Arruabarrena and Raluca Olaru in the final, 6–4, 7–6^{(7–5)}.

== Seeds ==
1. (Italy) Karin Knapp / (Italy) Roberta Vinci (first round)
2. (Chinese Taipei) Chan Hao-ching / (Spain) Anabel Medina Garrigues (champions)
3. (Germany) Anna-Lena Grönefeld / (Poland) Alicja Rosolska (quarterfinals)
4. (Spain) Lara Arruabarrena / (Romania) Raluca Olaru (final)

== Draw ==
Key

- Q = Qualifier
- WC = Wild card
- LL = Lucky loser
- Alt = Alternate
- ITF = ITF entry
- PR = Protected ranking
- SR = Special ranking
- SE = Special exempt
- JE = Junior exempt
- JR = Junior Accelerator Programme entrant
- CO = College Accelerator Programme entrant
- NG = Next Gen Accelerator Program entrant
- w/o = Walkover
- r = Retired
- d = Defaulted

First round
1	(Italy) K Knapp (Italy) R Vinci	6	4	[5]
(Australia) Ar Rodionova (Ukraine) O Savchuk	4	6	[10]
(Romania) E Bogdan (Czech Republic) E Hrdinová	6	6
(Russia) N Dzalamidze (Belarus) S Pirazhenka	4	3
4	(Spain) L Arruabarrena (Romania) R Olaru	6	7
WC	(Germany) A-L Friedsam (Germany) C Witthöft	3	5
(Netherlands) K Bertens (Netherlands) D Schuurs	6	6
(United States) N Melichar (Czech Republic) T Smitková	4	4
(Georgia (country)) O Kalashnikova (Russia) E Rodina	7	7^{7}
(Czech Republic) L Kunčíková (Czech Republic) K Stuchlá	5	6^{3}
(Slovenia) N Kolar (Slovakia) C Škamlová	4	3
3	(Germany) A-L Grönefeld (Poland) A Rosolska	6	6
(Austria) S Klemenschits (Germany) A Lottner	6	6^{3}	[10]
(Germany) A Beck (Argentina) M Irigoyen	4	7^{7}	[7]
WC	(Germany) K Gerlach (Germany) L Rüffer	1	2
2	(Chinese Taipei) H-c Chan (Spain) A Medina Garrigues	6	6

Quarterfinals
(Australia) Ar Rodionova (Ukraine) O Savchuk	5	6	[8]
(Romania) E Bogdan (Czech Republic) E Hrdinová	7	4	[10]
4	(Spain) L Arruabarrena (Romania) R Olaru	6	6
(Netherlands) K Bertens (Netherlands) D Schuurs	1	3
(Georgia (country)) O Kalashnikova (Russia) E Rodina	7	3	[10]
3	(Germany) A-L Grönefeld (Poland) A Rosolska	5	6	[5]
(Austria) S Klemenschits (Germany) A Lottner	4	1
2	(Chinese Taipei) H-c Chan (Spain) A Medina Garrigues	6	6

Semifinals
(Romania) E Bogdan (Czech Republic) E Hrdinová	2	3
4	(Spain) L Arruabarrena (Romania) R Olaru	6	6
(Georgia (country)) O Kalashnikova (Russia) E Rodina	2	6^{6}
2	(Chinese Taipei) H-c Chan (Spain) A Medina Garrigues	6	7^{8}

Final
4	(Spain) L Arruabarrena (Romania) R Olaru	4	6^{5}
2	(Chinese Taipei) H-c Chan (Spain) A Medina Garrigues	6	7^{7}
