= 2015 Nürnberger Versicherungscup =

- Date: 17 – 23 May
- Edition: 3rd
- Category: WTA International
- Draw: 32S / 16D
- Prize money: $250,000
- Surface: Clay / outdoor
- Location: Nuremberg, Germany
- Venue: Tennis-Club 1. FC Nürnberg

Champions

Singles
- (Italy) Karin Knapp

Doubles
- (Chinese Taipei) Chan Hao-ching / (Spain) Anabel Medina Garrigues
- Nürnberger Versicherungscup

The 2015 Nürnberger Versicherungscup was a professional tennis tournament played on outdoor clay courts. It was the third edition of the tournament, and part of the WTA International tier of the 2015 WTA Tour. It took place in Nuremberg, Germany, from 17 May until 23 May 2015. Sixth-seeded Karin Knapp won the singles title.

== Finals ==
=== Singles ===
(Italy) Karin Knapp defeated (Italy) Roberta Vinci, 7–6^{(7–5)}, 4–6, 6–1

- It was Knapp's only singles title of the year and the 2nd and last of her career.

=== Doubles ===
(Chinese Taipei) Chan Hao-ching / (Spain) Anabel Medina Garrigues defeated (Spain) Lara Arruabarrena / (Romania) Raluca Olaru, 6–4, 7–6^{(7–5)}

- It was Chan's 2nd doubles title of the year and the 6th of her career. It was Medina Garrigues's only doubles title of the year and the 25th of her career.

== Points and prize money ==
=== Point distribution ===
Event	W	F	SF	QF	Round of 16	Round of 32	Q	Q2	Q1
Singles	280	180	110	60	30	1	18	12	1
Doubles	280	180	110	60	1	—N/a	—N/a	—N/a	—N/a

=== Prize money ===
Event	W	F	SF	QF	Round of 16	Round of 32	Q2	Q1
Singles	€34,677	€17,258	€9,274	€4,980	€2,742	€1,694	€823	€484
Doubles	€9,919	€5,161	€2,770	€1,468	€774	—N/a	—N/a	—N/a

== Singles main draw entrants ==
=== Seeds ===
Country	Player	Rank^{1}	Seed
GER	Andrea Petkovic	9	1
GER	Angelique Kerber	11	2
GER	Sabine Lisicki	22	3
ITA	Roberta Vinci	44	4
SVK	Anna Karolína Schmiedlová	46	5
ITA	Karin Knapp	51	6
JPN	Kurumi Nara	54	7
GER	Carina Witthöft	56	8

- ^{1} Rankings as of 11 May 2015.

=== Other entrants ===
The following players received wildcards into the singles main draw:

- (Germany) Anna-Lena Friedsam
- (Germany) Antonia Lottner
- (Germany) Tatjana Maria

The following players received entry from the qualifying draw:

- (Japan) Misaki Doi
- (Romania) Andreea Mitu
- (Sweden) Rebecca Peterson
- (Kazakhstan) Yulia Putintseva
- (Belgium) Alison Van Uytvanck
- (Czech Republic) Renata Voráčová

=== Withdrawals ===
Before the tournament

- (Romania) Alexandra Dulgheru →replaced by Evgeniya Rodina
- (Russia) Daria Gavrilova →replaced by Yanina Wickmayer
- (New Zealand) Marina Erakovic →replaced by Kiki Bertens
- (Belgium) Kirsten Flipkens →replaced by Tímea Babos

During the tournament

- (Germany) Angelique Kerber

=== Retirements ===
- (Germany) Andrea Petkovic

== Doubles main draw entrants ==
=== Seeds ===
Country	Player	Country	Player	Rank^{1}	Seed
ITA	Karin Knapp	ITA	Roberta Vinci	63	1
TPE	Chan Hao-ching	ESP	Anabel Medina Garrigues	75	2
GER	Anna-Lena Grönefeld	POL	Alicja Rosolska	81	3
ESP	Lara Arruabarrena	ROU	Raluca Olaru	108	4

- ^{1} Rankings as of 11 May 2015.

=== Other entrants ===
The following pair received a wildcard into the doubles main draw:

- (Germany) Anna-Lena Friedsam / (Germany) Carina Witthöft
- (Germany) Katharina Gerlach / (Germany) Lena Rüffer
