= 2015 Nürnberger Versicherungscup – Singles =

Singles
- 2015 Nürnberger Versicherungscup

Final
- Champion: (Italy) Karin Knapp
- Runner-up: (Italy) Roberta Vinci
- Score: 7–6^{(7–5)}, 4–6, 6–1

Details
- Draw: 32
- Seeds: 8

Events
Singles	Doubles
- Nürnberger Versicherungscup

Eugenie Bouchard was the defending champion, but chose not to participate this year.

Karin Knapp won the title, defeating Roberta Vinci in the final, 7–6^{(7–5)}, 4–6, 6–1.

== Seeds ==
1. (Germany) Andrea Petkovic (first round; retired)
2. (Germany) Angelique Kerber (semifinals; withdrew)
3. (Germany) Sabine Lisicki (second round)
4. (Italy) Roberta Vinci (final)
5. (Slovakia) Anna Karolína Schmiedlová (first round)
6. (Italy) Karin Knapp (champion)
7. (Japan) Kurumi Nara (quarterfinals)
8. (Germany) Carina Witthöft (quarterfinals)

== Draw ==
Key

- Q = Qualifier
- WC = Wild card
- LL = Lucky loser
- Alt = Alternate
- ITF = ITF entry
- PR = Protected ranking
- SR = Special ranking
- SE = Special exempt
- JE = Junior exempt
- JR = Junior Accelerator Programme entrant
- CO = College Accelerator Programme entrant
- NG = Next Gen Accelerator Program entrant
- w/o = Walkover
- r = Retired
- d = Defaulted

=== Finals ===
Semifinals
6	(Italy) Karin Knapp	6	6
(Spain) Lara Arruabarrena	0	2
4	(Italy) Roberta Vinci	w/o
2	(Germany) Angelique Kerber

Final
6	(Italy) Karin Knapp	7^{7}	4	6
4	(Italy) Roberta Vinci	6^{5}	6	1

=== Top half ===
First round
1	(Germany) A Petkovic	0^{r}
Q	(Kazakhstan) Y Putintseva	5
(Netherlands) K Bertens	6	6
(Kazakhstan) Y Shvedova	1	3
WC	(Germany) T Maria	4	4
WC	(Germany) A-L Friedsam	6	6
WC	(Germany) A Lottner	2	5
6	(Italy) K Knapp	6	7
3	(Germany) S Lisicki	6	7
(Spain) S Soler Espinosa	4	5
(Hungary) T Babos	2	5
(Spain) L Arruabarrena	6	7
(Russia) E Rodina	4	6	7
(Belgium) Y Wickmayer	6	3	5
Q	(Belgium) A Van Uytvanck	7^{7}	3	3
8	(Germany) C Witthöft	6^{2}	6	6

Second round
Q	(Kazakhstan) Y Putintseva	6	5	7
(Netherlands) K Bertens	4	7	5
WC	(Germany) A-L Friedsam	1	3
6	(Italy) K Knapp	6	6
3	(Germany) S Lisicki	2	7^{7}	6^{3}
(Spain) L Arruabarrena	6	6^{3}	7^{7}
(Russia) E Rodina	1	2
8	(Germany) C Witthöft	6	6

Quarterfinals
Q	(Kazakhstan) Y Putintseva	2	4
6	(Italy) K Knapp	6	6
(Spain) L Arruabarrena	6	6
8	(Germany) C Witthöft	0	4

Semifinals
6	(Italy) K Knapp	6	6
(Spain) L Arruabarrena	0	2

=== Bottom half ===
First round
7	(Japan) K Nara	7	5	6
(Slovenia) P Hercog	5	7	2
Q	(Czech Republic) R Voráčová	7^{7}	4	2
(Switzerland) S Vögele	6^{3}	6	6
(Czech Republic) T Smitková	6	3	6
Q	(Romania) A Mitu	1	6	3
(Russia) V Diatchenko	1	1
4	(Italy) R Vinci	6	6
5	(Slovakia) AK Schmiedlová	2	1
Q	(Japan) M Doi	6	6
(Serbia) B Jovanovski	1	5
(China) S Zhang	6	7
(Czech Republic) K Koukalová	6	7^{8}
(Germany) A Beck	4	6^{6}
Q	(Sweden) R Peterson	5	4
2	(Germany) A Kerber	7	6

Second round
7	(Japan) K Nara	6	6
(Switzerland) S Vögele	3	4
(Czech Republic) T Smitková	2	1
4	(Italy) R Vinci	6	6
Q	(Japan) M Doi	1	6	6
(China) S Zhang	6	3	1
(Czech Republic) K Koukalová	1	6^{2}
2	(Germany) A Kerber	6	7^{7}

Quarterfinals
7	(Japan) K Nara	1	6	4
4	(Italy) R Vinci	6	1	6
Q	(Japan) M Doi	2	3
2	(Germany) A Kerber	6	6

Semifinals
4	(Italy) R Vinci	w/o
2	(Germany) A Kerber

== Qualifying ==
=== Seeds ===
1. (Belgium) Yanina Wickmayer (moved to main draw)
2. (Belgium) Alison Van Uytvanck (qualified)
3. (United States) Nicole Gibbs (first round)
4. (Romania) Andreea Mitu (qualified)
5. (Kazakhstan) Yulia Putintseva (qualified)
6. (Japan) Misaki Doi (qualified)
7. (Ukraine) Yuliya Beygelzimer (qualifying competition)
8. (Argentina) María Irigoyen (first round)
9. (United States) Bethanie Mattek-Sands (first round)
10. (Australia) Anastasia Rodionova (withdrew because of gastroenteritis)
11. (Romania) Ana Bogdan (first round)
12. (Czech Republic) Andrea Hlaváčková (qualifying competition)
13. (Czech Republic) Renata Voráčová (qualified)

=== Qualifiers ===
1. (Czech Republic) Renata Voráčová
2. (Belgium) Alison Van Uytvanck
3. (Sweden) Rebecca Peterson
4. (Romania) Andreea Mitu
5. (Kazakhstan) Yulia Putintseva
6. (Japan) Misaki Doi

=== Draw ===
==== First qualifier ====
First round
13	(Czech Republic) Renata Voráčová	6	7^{8}
(Ukraine) Anhelina Kalinina	2	6^{6}
(Spain) Laura Pous Tió	6	6
8	(Argentina) María Irigoyen	2	1

Qualifying competition
13	(Czech Republic) Renata Voráčová	6	7
(Spain) Laura Pous Tió	3	5

==== Second qualifier ====
First round
2	(Belgium) Alison Van Uytvanck	6	6
(Czech Republic) Kateřina Vaňková	3	4
WC	(Germany) Lena Rüffer	4	7^{7}	6^{5}
Alt	(Australia) Arina Rodionova	6	6^{5}	7^{7}

Qualifying competition
2	(Belgium) Alison Van Uytvanck	6	6
Alt	(Australia) Arina Rodionova	3	4

==== Third qualifier ====
First round
3	(United States) Nicole Gibbs	6^{3}	3
(Netherlands) Cindy Burger	7^{7}	6
(Sweden) Rebecca Peterson	6	6
11	(Romania) Ana Bogdan	3	2

Qualifying competition
(Netherlands) Cindy Burger	4	1
(Sweden) Rebecca Peterson	6	6

==== Fourth qualifier ====
First round
4	(Romania) Andreea Mitu	6	6
Alt	(Czech Republic) Tereza Martincová	3	3
WC	(Austria) Barbara Haas	2	2
12	(Czech Republic) Andrea Hlaváčková	6	6

Qualifying competition
4	(Romania) Andreea Mitu	6	6
12	(Czech Republic) Andrea Hlaváčková	2	3

==== Fifth qualifier ====
First round
5	(Kazakhstan) Yulia Putintseva	6	6
(Slovenia) Nastja Kolar	3	4
(Netherlands) Arantxa Rus	4	6	6
9	(United States) Bethanie Mattek-Sands	6	3	2

Qualifying competition
5	(Kazakhstan) Yulia Putintseva	6	6
(Netherlands) Arantxa Rus	3	3

==== Sixth qualifier ====
First round
6	(Japan) Misaki Doi	6	6
WC	(Austria) Mira Antonitsch	3	0
WC	(Germany) Katharina Gerlach	3	3
7	(Ukraine) Yuliya Beygelzimer	6	6

Qualifying competition
6	(Japan) Misaki Doi	6^{6}	6	7
7	(Ukraine) Yuliya Beygelzimer	7^{8}	2	5
