= 2014 Nürnberger Versicherungscup – Singles =

Singles
- 2014 Nürnberger Versicherungscup
- 2013 Champion: (Romania) Simona Halep

Final
- Champion: (Canada) Eugenie Bouchard
- Runner-up: (Czech Republic) Karolína Plíšková
- Score: 6–2, 4–6, 6–3

Details
- Draw: 32
- Seeds: 8

Events
Singles	Doubles
- Nürnberger Versicherungscup

Simona Halep was the defending champion, but she chose not to participate this year.
Eugenie Bouchard won her first and only career singles title, defeating Karolína Plíšková in the final, 6–2, 4–6, 6–3.

== Seeds ==
1. (Germany) Angelique Kerber (quarterfinals)
2. (Canada) Eugenie Bouchard (champion)
3. (Czech Republic) Klára Koukalová (first round)
4. (Ukraine) Elina Svitolina (semifinals)
5. (Austria) Yvonne Meusburger (first round)
6. (Japan) Kurumi Nara (second round)
7. (France) Caroline Garcia (quarterfinals)
8. (Germany) Annika Beck (second round)

== Draw ==
Key

- Q = Qualifier
- WC = Wild card
- LL = Lucky loser
- Alt = Alternate
- ITF = ITF entry
- PR = Protected ranking
- SR = Special ranking
- SE = Special exempt
- JE = Junior exempt
- JR = Junior Accelerator Programme entrant
- CO = College Accelerator Programme entrant
- NG = Next Gen Accelerator Program entrant
- w/o = Walkover
- r = Retired
- d = Defaulted

=== Finals ===
Semifinals
(Czech Republic) Karolína Plíšková	2	6	6
4	(Ukraine) Elina Svitolina	6	1	2
(Italy) Karin Knapp	4	3
2	(Canada) Eugenie Bouchard	6	6

Final
(Czech Republic) Karolína Plíšková	2	6	3
2	(Canada) Eugenie Bouchard	6	4	6

=== Top half ===
First round
1	(Germany) A Kerber	6	6
(New Zealand) M Erakovic	4	2
WC	(Austria) L-M Moser	6	0	1
WC	(Germany) A-L Friedsam	3	6	6
WC	(Germany) A Lottner	1	2
(Belgium) A Van Uytvanck	6	6
(Czech Republic) Ka Plíšková	6	6
5	(Austria) Y Meusburger	3	4
4	(Ukraine) E Svitolina	7	6
PR	(Czech Republic) I Melzer	5	4
Q	(Spain) B García Vidagany	6	6
Q	(Germany) N Zander	2	3
(Switzerland) B Bencic	6^{4}	3
(Germany) M Barthel	7^{7}	6
(Slovakia) J Čepelová	2	3
8	(Germany) A Beck	6	6

Second round
1	(Germany) A Kerber	6	7^{7}
WC	(Germany) A-L Friedsam	2	6^{0}
(Belgium) A Van Uytvanck	6^{5}	3
(Czech Republic) Ka Plíšková	7^{7}	6
4	(Ukraine) E Svitolina	7^{7}	6
Q	(Spain) B García Vidagany	6^{4}	3
(Germany) M Barthel	6	6
8	(Germany) A Beck	2	4

Quarterfinals
1	(Germany) A Kerber	6^{5}	4
(Czech Republic) Ka Plíšková	7^{7}	6
4	(Ukraine) E Svitolina	6	6
(Germany) M Barthel	4	4

Semifinals
(Czech Republic) Ka Plíšková	2	6	6
4	(Ukraine) E Svitolina	6	1	2

=== Bottom half ===
First round
7	(France) C Garcia	6	5	7
Q	(Israel) J Glushko	4	7	5
(Germany) D Pfizenmaier	6	6
LL	(Paraguay) M González	2	4
(Israel) S Pe'er	3	2
(Italy) K Knapp	6	6
(Slovenia) P Hercog	1	6	6
3	(Czech Republic) K Koukalová	6	2	1
6	(Japan) K Nara	6	6
(Romania) M Niculescu	3	4
(Austria) P Mayr-Achleitner	5	3
(Kazakhstan) Y Shvedova	7	6
LL	(Czech Republic) T Martincová	3	6	3
Q	(Australia) A Rodionova	6	3	6
(Czech Republic) B Záhlavová-Strýcová	0	3
2	(Canada) E Bouchard	6	6

Second round
7	(France) C Garcia	7	5	6
(Germany) D Pfizenmaier	5	7	3
(Italy) K Knapp	6	6
(Slovenia) P Hercog	3	3
6	(Japan) K Nara	4	2
(Kazakhstan) Y Shvedova	6	6
Q	(Australia) A Rodionova	0	1
2	(Canada) E Bouchard	6	6

Quarterfinals
7	(France) C Garcia	7^{11}	4	4
(Italy) K Knapp	6^{9}	6	6
(Kazakhstan) Y Shvedova	6^{3}	6^{6}
2	(Canada) E Bouchard	7^{7}	7^{8}

Semifinals
(Italy) K Knapp	4	3
2	(Canada) E Bouchard	6	6

== Qualifying ==
=== Seeds ===
1. (Poland) Katarzyna Piter (first round)
2. (Israel) Julia Glushko (qualified)
3. (Croatia) Petra Martić (qualifying competition, withdrew)
4. (Belarus) Aliaksandra Sasnovich (first round)
5. (Kazakhstan) Yulia Putintseva (withdrew)
6. (Poland) Paula Kania (first round)
7. (Kazakhstan) Sesil Karatantcheva (second round)
8. (Latvia) Diāna Marcinkēviča (second round)
9. (Russia) Polina Vinogradova (second round)

=== Qualifiers ===
1. (Australia) Anastasia Rodionova
2. (Israel) Julia Glushko
3. (Germany) Nina Zander
4. (Spain) Beatriz García Vidagany

=== Lucky losers ===
1. (Paraguay) Montserrat González
2. (Czech Republic) Tereza Martincová

=== Qualifying draw ===
==== First qualifier ====
First round
1	(Poland) Katarzyna Piter	6	2	2
(Bulgaria) Dia Evtimova	2	6	6
(Slovenia) Dalila Jakupovič	6	7
(Austria) Melanie Klaffner	3	5
(Australia) Anastasia Rodionova	7	6
WC	(Germany) Luisa Marie Huber	5	4
(Italy) Giulia Gatto-Monticone	6	2	6^{3}
8	(Latvia) Diāna Marcinkēviča	1	6	7^{7}

Second round
(Bulgaria) Dia Evtimova	6	6
(Slovenia) Dalila Jakupovič	1	0
(Australia) Anastasia Rodionova	6	7^{7}
8	(Latvia) Diāna Marcinkēviča	4	6^{5}

Qualifying competition
(Bulgaria) Dia Evtimova	6	0	1
(Australia) Anastasia Rodionova	3	6	6

==== Second qualifier ====
First round
2	(Israel) Julia Glushko	6	6
(Italy) Maria Elena Camerin	4	2
(Russia) Marina Melnikova	6	6
(Brazil) Laura Pigossi	0	4
(Croatia) Ana Vrljić	4	1
WC	(Germany) Katharina Gerlach	6	6
(Czech Republic) Tereza Martincová	6	3	6
6	(Poland) Paula Kania	3	6	4

Second round
2	(Israel) Julia Glushko	6	6
(Russia) Marina Melnikova	3	4
WC	(Germany) Katharina Gerlach	3	3
(Czech Republic) Tereza Martincová	6	6

Qualifying competition
2	(Israel) Julia Glushko	6	6
(Czech Republic) Tereza Martincová	4	4

==== Third qualifier ====
First round
3	(Croatia) Petra Martić	6	5	6
(Venezuela) Andrea Gámiz	2	7	1
WC	(Germany) Yana Morderger	5	4
(Germany) Kristina Barrois	7	6
(Czech Republic) Kateřina Vaňková	4	2
(Germany) Nina Zander	6	6
(Netherlands) Lesley Kerkhove	4	5
7	(Kazakhstan) Sesil Karatantcheva	6	7

Second round
3	(Croatia) Petra Martić	6	6
(Germany) Kristina Barrois	2	4
(Germany) Nina Zander	6	6
7	(Kazakhstan) Sesil Karatantcheva	4	1

Qualifying competition
3	(Croatia) Petra Martić
(Germany) Nina Zander	w/o

==== Fourth qualifier ====
First round
4	(Belarus) Aliaksandra Sasnovich	3	1
(Spain) Beatriz García Vidagany	6	6
(Turkey) Pemra Özgen	6	6
WC	(Germany) Tayisiya Morderger	4	4
(Paraguay) Montserrat González	6	7
(Poland) Katarzyna Kawa	1	5
(Belarus) Ilona Kremen	6	1	3
9	(Russia) Polina Vinogradova	3	6	6

Second round
(Spain) Beatriz García Vidagany	6	6
(Turkey) Pemra Özgen	1	4
(Paraguay) Montserrat González	6	6^{3}	6
9	(Russia) Polina Vinogradova	4	7^{7}	1

Qualifying competition
(Spain) Beatriz García Vidagany	6	5	7^{8}
(Paraguay) Montserrat González	1	7	6^{6}
