= Karin Knapp =

Italian tennis player (born 1987)

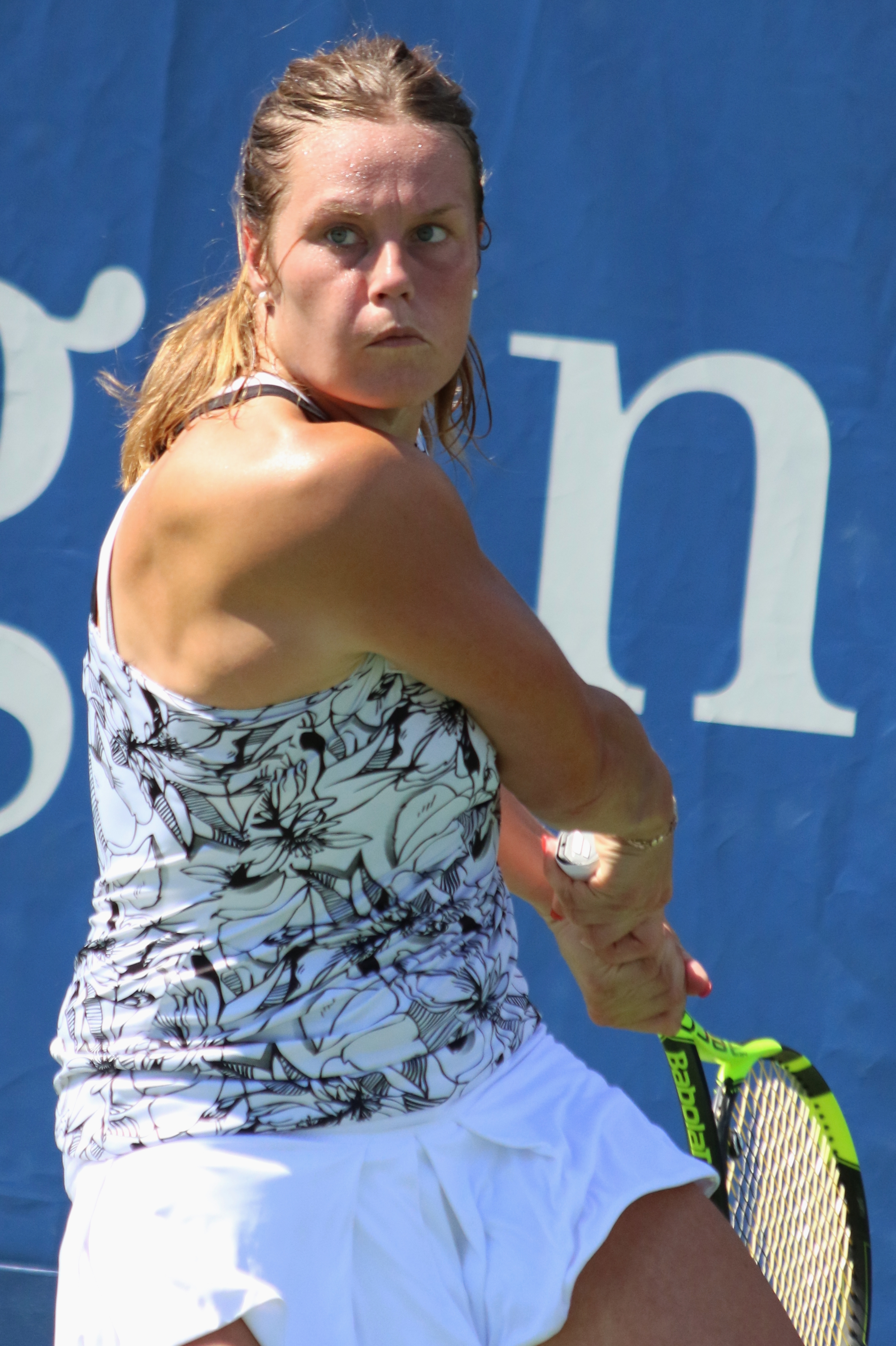
- Knapp at the 2016 US Open
- Country (sports): Italy
- Residence: Anzio
- Born: 28 June 1987 (age 39) Bruneck
- Height: 1.80 m (5 ft 11 in)
- Turned pro: 2002
- Retired: 13 May 2018
- Plays: Right-handed (two-handed backhand)
- Prize money: $2,283,203

Singles
- Career record: 377–265
- Career titles: 2
- Highest ranking: No. 33 (24 August 2015)

Grand Slam singles results
- Australian Open: 2R (2009, 2014)
- French Open: 3R (2007, 2008, 2016)
- Wimbledon: 4R (2013)
- US Open: 3R (2013)

Doubles
- Career record: 85–88
- Career titles: 0
- Highest ranking: No. 49 (28 September 2015)

Grand Slam doubles results
- Australian Open: 2R (2014, 2015, 2017)
- French Open: 3R (2014, 2015)
- Wimbledon: 3R (2015)
- US Open: 3R (2015)

Team competitions
- Fed Cup: W (2013)

Karin Knapp (born 28 June 1987) is an Italian former tennis player.

In her career, Knapp won two singles titles on the WTA Tour, along with six singles and six doubles titles on the ITF Circuit. On 24 August 2015, she reached her best singles ranking of world No. 33. On 28 September 2015, she peaked at No. 49 in the WTA doubles rankings.

As a member of the Italy Fed Cup team, Knapp was part of the winning squad in 2013 and has a win–loss record of 3–3.

== Personal life ==
Knapp was born 1987 in the northern Italian province of South Tyrol. Her father, Alois, is a fabric manufacturer and her mother, Marianne, is a retired school teacher. She has two brothers, Stefan and Michael. Knapp was introduced to tennis at age seven by her parents. She admires Kim Clijsters.

== Career ==
=== 2007 ===
At the French Open, her first Grand Slam tournament, she reached the third round in the singles event, beating 22nd-seeded Alona Bondarenko. In the third round, she lost to 14th-seeded Patty Schnyder.

At the US Open, she defeated Chan Yung-jan to reach the second round where she lost to American wildcard Ahsha Rolle. Her biggest ITF final came in 2007 in Biella, where she was beaten by Agnieszka Radwańska.

=== 2008 ===
Knapp reached her first WTA Tour final in 2008 in Antwerp. She lost there to world No. 1 and home favorite, Justine Henin. At the 2008 French Open, she lost in the third round to top-seeded Maria Sharapova.

=== 2012 ===
Knapp started season off at the Brisbane International. She was defeated in the second round of qualifying by Vera Dushevina. At the Hobart International, Knapp lost in the first round of qualifying to Irina Falconi. In Melbourne at the Australian Open, she was defeated in the second round of qualifying by Kurumi Nara.

=== 2013 ===
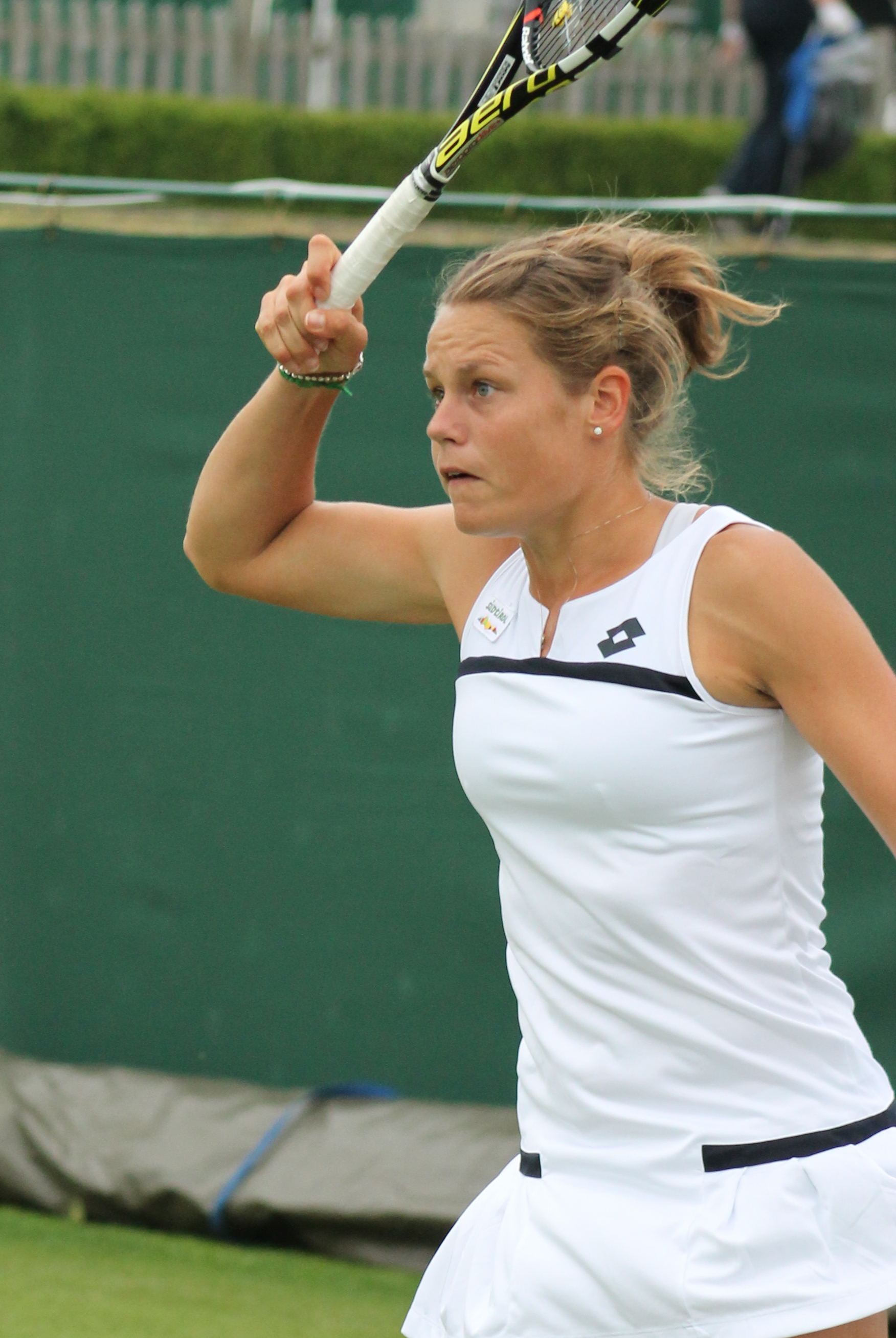
Knapp at the 2013 Wimbledon Championships

Knapp began the year at the Brisbane International where she lost in the second round of qualifying to Australian wildcard Bojana Bobusic. At the Sydney International, Knapp was defeated in the first round of qualifying by Alexa Glatch. After qualifying for the Australian Open, she lost in the first round to fellow qualifier Maria João Koehler.

After that, Knapp traveled to Paris to play at the Open GdF Suez where she was defeated in the first round of qualifying to Garbiñe Muguruza. In Bogotá at the Copa Colsanitas, Knapp made it to the semifinals defeating Eva Birnerová, Lourdes Domínguez Lino, and Lara Arruabarrena Vecino. She lost in her semifinal match to top seed and eventual champion Jelena Janković. At the Abierto Mexicano, Knapp was defeated in her quarterfinal match by Sílvia Soler Espinosa.

Knapp began her clay-court season at the Rabat Grand Prix. Despite qualifying for the main draw, she lost in the second round to third seed Alizé Cornet. At the Portugal Open, Knapp was defeated in the first round of qualifying by Shahar Pe'er. Seeded second in Trnava at the Empire Slovak Open, Knapp reached the final where she lost to Barbora Záhlavová-Strýcová. Knapp played her final tournament before the French Open at the Italian Open. She was defeated in the first round by Christina McHale. At the French Open, Knapp lost in the first round to 17th seed Sloane Stephens. After the French Open, Knapp competed at the first edition of the Nürnberger Versicherungscup. She was defeated in the second round by eighth seed Annika Beck.

Knapp only played one grass-court tournament in the leadup to Wimbledon. At the Eastbourne International, she lost in the first round of qualifying to Melanie Oudin. Knapp earned her best result at a major in the Wimbledon Championships, making it to the fourth round beating Lucie Hradecká, 27th seed Lucie Šafářová, and qualifier Michelle Larcher de Brito. She was defeated in her fourth-round match by 15th seed and eventual champion, Marion Bartoli.

After Wimbledon, Knapp competed at the Internazionali di Palermo. She lost in the second round to fourth seed Klára Zakopalová. Seeded eighth at the Gastein Ladies, Knapp reached the semifinal round where she was defeated by eventual champion Yvonne Meusburger.

Despite qualifying for the Western & Southern Open, Knapp lost in the first round to ninth seed Angelique Kerber. Knapp played her final tournament before the US Open at the New Haven Open. She successfully qualified for the main draw; she was defeated in the second round by fourth seed Caroline Wozniacki. Ranked 55 at the US Open, Knapp reached the third round after wins over American qualifier Grace Min and 22nd seed Elena Vesnina. She lost in the third round to tenth seed Roberta Vinci.

In Austria at the Ladies Linz, Knapp upset eighth seed Daniela Hantuchová in her first-round match. In the second round, she was defeated by Stefanie Vögele. Knapp's final tournament of the season was at the Luxembourg Open where she reached the quarterfinals but lost to third seed Sabine Lisicki.

Knapp ended the year ranked 41.

=== 2014: First WTA Tour title ===
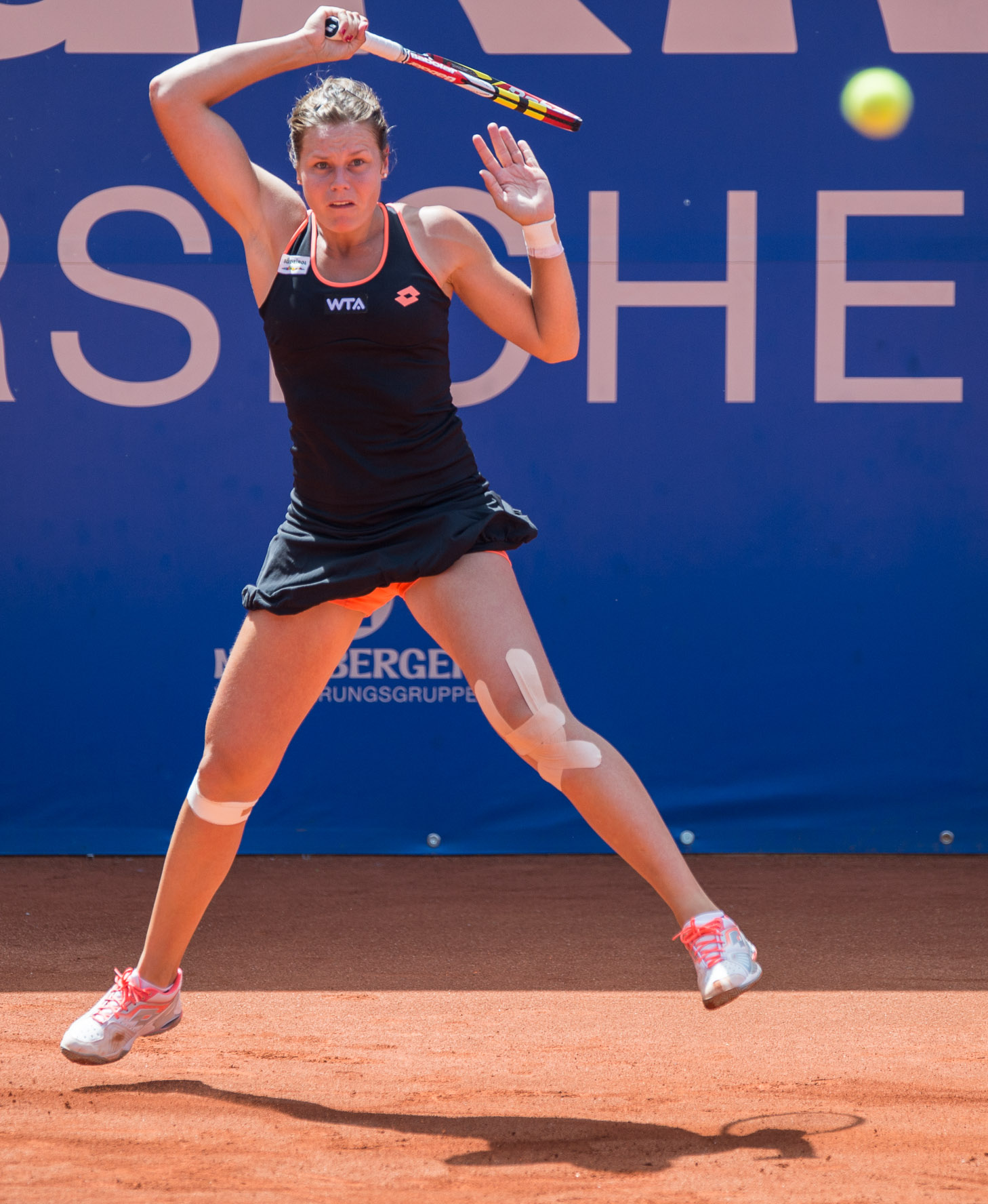
Knapp at the 2014 Nürnberger Versicherungscup

Knapp began the season at the Auckland Open. Seeded eighth, she was defeated in the first round by Julia Görges. At the Hobart International, Knapp lost in the first round to qualifier Estrella Cabeza Candela. Ranked 44 at the Australian Open, she beat Paula Ormaechea in the first round. In the second round, she faced third seed Maria Sharapova. Knapp took Sharapova to three sets, but she ended up losing the three hour and 28 minute match.

In Paris at the Open GdF Suez, Knapp lost in the second round to third seed, last year finalist, and eventual finalist Sara Errani. Playing in the Fed Cup tie versus the US, Knapp won both of her rubbers over Christina McHale and Alison Riske. Italy won the tie 3–1 to advance to the semifinal round. At the Qatar Open in Doha, Knapp beat Caroline Garcia in the first round. She was defeated in the second round by fifth seed Jelena Janković. Knapp lost in the second round of qualifying at the Dubai Championships to Annika Beck. At Indian Wells, Knapp was defeated in round one by American wildcard Taylor Townsend. At the Miami Open, Knapp lost in the first round to qualifier Patricia Mayr-Achleitner. Seeded seventh at the Monterrey Open, Knapp was defeated in the first round by eventual finalist Jovana Jakšić.

Knapp started her clay-court season at the Copa Colsanitas. Seeded third, she lost in the first round to Chanelle Scheepers. In Estoril at the Portugal Open, Knapp was defeated in the first round by Yaroslava Shvedova. At the Madrid Open, Knapp lost in the first round to Bojana Jovanovski. In Rome at the Italian Open, Knapp was defeated in the first round by 11th seed Ana Ivanovic. Knapp played her final tournament before the French Open at the Nürnberger Versicherungscup. She advanced to the semifinals after wins over Shahar Pe'er, Polona Hercog, and seventh seed Caroline Garcia. She lost in her semifinal match to second seed and eventual champion Eugenie Bouchard. Ranked 49 at the French Open, Knapp was defeated in the first round by Mona Barthel.

After skipping the Birmingham Classic and the Rosmalen Open, Knapp returned to action at the Wimbledon Championships. She lost in a three-set thriller in the first round to Karolína Plíšková.

As the top seed at the Reinert Open, a $50k tournament in Germany, Knapp was defeated in the first round by qualifier Verónica Cepede Royg. Seeded fourth at the first edition of the Bucharest Open, Knapp lost in the second round to Danka Kovinić. At the İstanbul Cup, Knapp was defeated in the second round by top seed and eventual champion Caroline Wozniacki.

Qualifying for the Canadian Open, Knapp lost in round one to Caroline Garcia. Even though Knapp qualified for the Cincinnati Open, she was defeated in the second round by Anastasia Pavlyuchenkova. Knapp fell in the final round of qualifying at the Connecticut Open to Peng Shuai. Ranked 71 at the US Open, Knapp lost in the first round to Tsvetana Pironkova.

Seeded third at the Tashkent Open, Knapp reached the final after victories over Çağla Büyükakçay, Aliaksandra Sasnovich, Olga Govortsova, and qualifier Lesia Tsurenko. She beat top seed and defending champion Bojana Jovanovski in the final to win her first WTA Tour title. At the Guangzhou International Open, Knapp was defeated in the first round by Monica Puig. Qualifying for the first edition of the Wuhan Open, Knapp lost in the second round to third seed and eventual champion, Petra Kvitová. In Austria at the Ladies Linz, Knapp advanced to the semifinals with wins over fifth seed Sabine Lisicki, Magdaléna Rybáriková, and Tsvetana Pironkova. She was defeated in her semifinal match by compatriot Camila Giorgi. in her final tournament of the year at the Luxembourg Open, Knapp faced Patricia Mayr-Achleitner in her first-round match and retired leading 3–2 in the first set due to a left thigh injury.

Knapp ended the year ranked 56.

=== 2015 ===
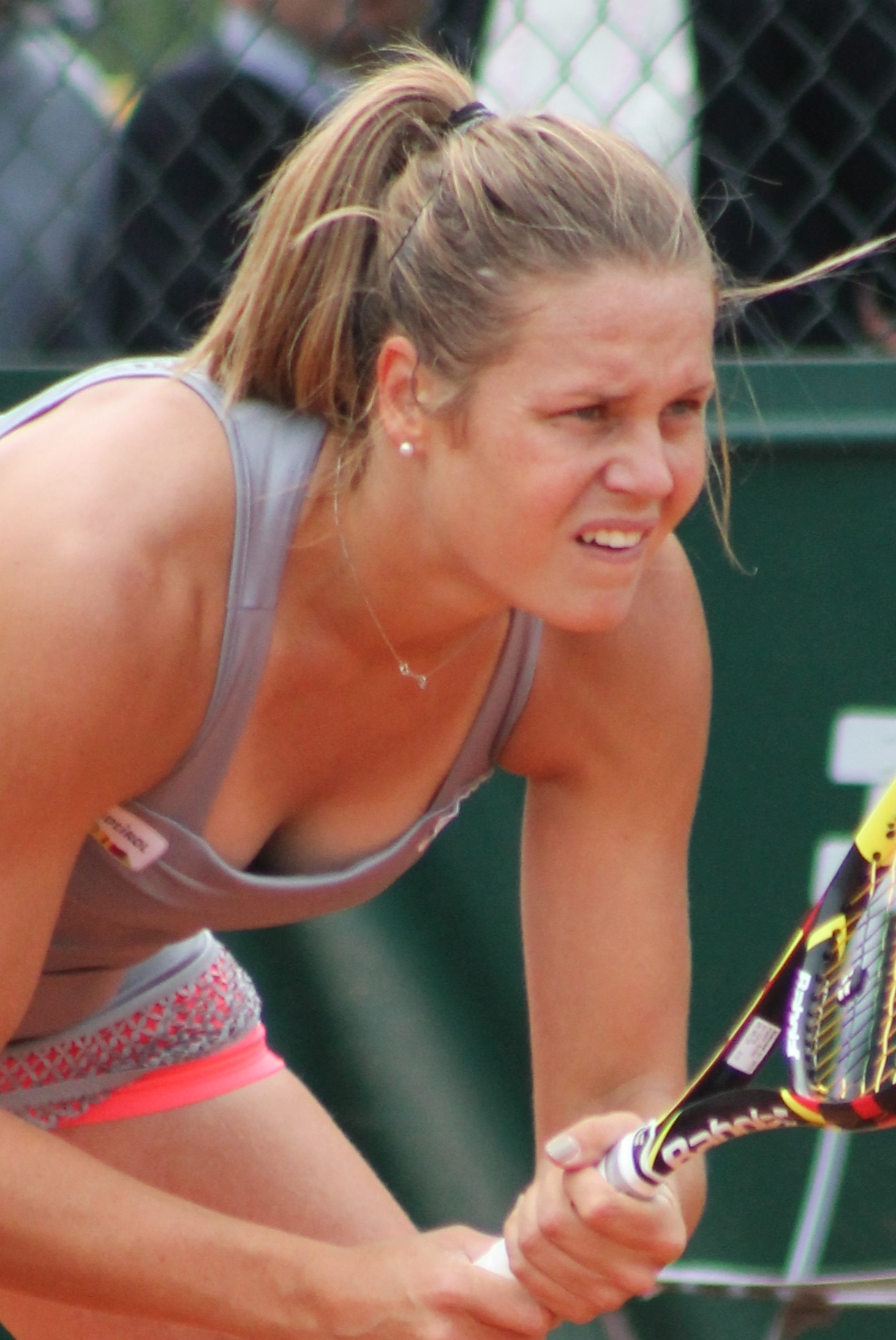
Knapp at the 2015 French Open

Knapp started her 2015 season off at the Shenzhen Open. After winning her first-round match, she was defeated in the second round by eighth seed and eventual finalist Timea Bacsinszky. In the Hobart International, Knapp reached the quarterfinals beating Ajla Tomljanović and top seed Casey Dellacqua. She lost her quarterfinal match to qualifier and eventual finalist Madison Brengle. Ranked 50 at the Australian Open, Knapp was defeated in the first round by third seed Simona Halep.

Competing in Antwerp, Belgium at the Diamond Games, Knapp was defeated in her first-round match by Annika Beck. At the Dubai Championships, Knapp lost in the first round to Belinda Bencic. In Monterrey, Knapp was defeated in the first round by third seed and eventual finalist Caroline Garcia. At the Indian Wells Open, Knapp lost in the first round to Yanina Wickmayer. At the Miami Open, Knapp was defeated in the second round by eighth seed Ekaterina Makarova. Seeded sixth at the Katowice Open, she lost in the first round to Vera Zvonareva.

Knapp began her clay-court season at the Morocco Open and defeated Çağla Büyükakçay and sixth seed Roberta Vinci. She was defeated in her quarterfinal match by fourth seed and eventual champion Elina Svitolina. Playing in Rome at the Italian Open, Knapp scored a first-round victory over compatriot Francesca Schiavone. She lost in the second round to fourth seed Petra Kvitová. Seeded sixth at the Nürnberger Versicherungscup, Knapp reached the final defeating Antonia Lottner, Anna-Lena Friedsam, qualifier Yulia Putintseva, and Lara Arruabarrena. In the final, she beat fourth seed Roberta Vinci to win her second career title. Ranked 42 at the French Open, Knapp was defeated in the first round by fifth seed Caroline Wozniacki.

Knapp began her grass-court season at the first edition of the Nottingham Open. Seeded fourth, she lost in the first round to Yanina Wickmayer. At the Birmingham Classic, Knapp was defeated in the first round by 13th seed Svetlana Kuznetsova. At Wimbledon, Knapp retired in the second set during her first-round match against Magdaléna Rybáriková.

Seeded third at the Gastein Ladies, Knapp made it to the final after victories over Tamira Paszek, Johanna Larsson, Polona Hercog, and top seed Sara Errani. In the final, she lost to second seed Sam Stosur. Seeded second at the Baku Cup, Knapp was defeated in the semifinals by Margarita Gasparyan.

In Toronto at the Canadian Open, Knapp lost in the first round to Roberta Vinci; this was the worst loss of her career. At the Western & Southern Open, Knapp was defeated in the third round by top seed and defending champion Serena Williams. Ranked 34 at the US Open, Knapp lost in the second round to 11th seed Angelique Kerber.

Knapp was forced to end the season early due to a knee injury. She ended the year ranked 51.

=== 2016 ===
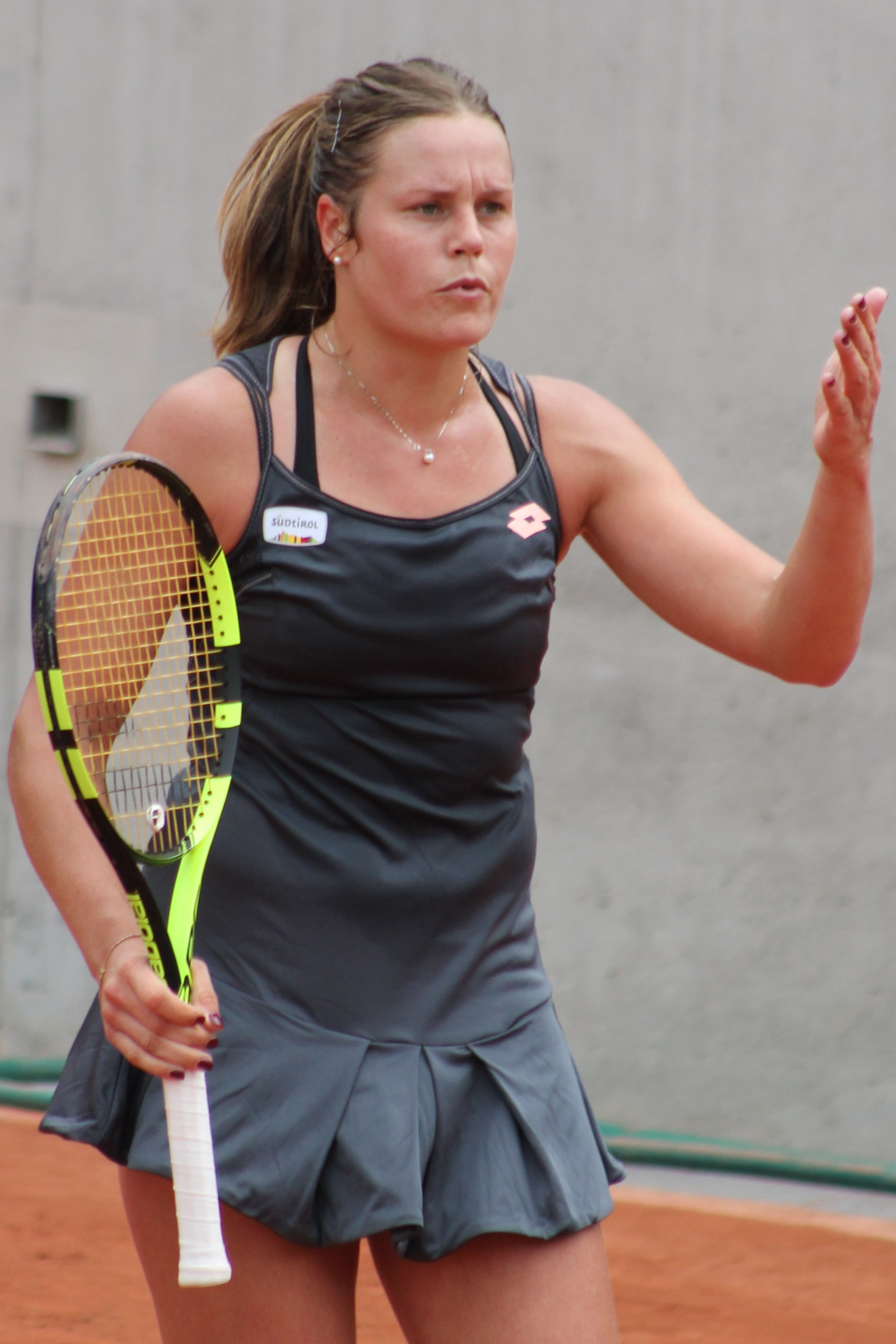
Knapp at the 2016 French Open

Knapp returned to action in March at the Miami Open where she lost in the first round to Yanina Wickmayer. In Poland at the Katowice Open, Knapp was defeated in the first round by Naomi Broady.

Knapp began clay-court season at the İstanbul Cup. She lost in the first round to Hsieh Su-wei. In Spain at the Madrid Open, Knapp was defeated in the second round by sixth seed and eventual champion Simona Halep. At the Italian Open, Knapp lost in round one to Barbora Strýcová. Knapp had a lucky run at the French Open. In the first round, she faced fifth seed Victoria Azarenka and won the match when Azarenka retired during the third set due to a right knee injury. Then, she beat Anastasija Sevastova to reach the third round for the first time since 2008. She was defeated in the third round by Yulia Putintseva.

As the top seed at the Internazionali di Brescia, a $50k tournament, Knapp won the title beating Jesika Malečková in the final.

Ranked 90 at the Wimbledon Championships, Knapp lost in the first round to Ana Konjuh.

At the Swedish Open, Knapp was defeated in the quarterfinals by Julia Görges. Knapp retired during her second-round match against Rebecca Peterson at the Prague Open. In August, Knapp represented Italy at the Rio Olympics. She lost in the first round to Lucie Šafářová.

Playing in Cincinnati at the Western & Southern Open, Knapp was defeated in the final round of qualifying by Kurumi Nara. At the US Open, Knapp lost in the first round to Johanna Larsson.

Knapp did not play any more tournaments for the rest of the season. She ended the year ranked 144.

=== 2017–2018: Last matches & retirement ===
In Melbourne at the Australian Open, Knapp retired during her first-round match versus Hsieh Su-wei due to injury. This ended up being Knapp's final match of her career. In April, she married her partner and coach, Francesco Piccari.

On 13 May 2018, Knapp announced retirement from tennis due to a chronic right knee injury.

== Performance timelines ==
Key
W	F	SF	QF	#R	RR	Q#	P#	DNQ	A	Z#	PO	G	S	B	NMS	NTI	P	NH

(W) winner; (F) finalist; (SF) semifinalist; (QF) quarterfinalist; (#R) rounds 4, 3, 2, 1; (RR) round-robin stage; (Q#) qualification round; (P#) preliminary round; (DNQ) did not qualify; (A) absent; (Z#) Davis/Fed Cup Zonal Group (with number indication) or (PO) play-off; (G) gold, (S) silver or (B) bronze Olympic/Paralympic medal; (NMS) not a Masters tournament; (NTI) not a Tier I tournament; (P) postponed; (NH) not held; (SR) strike rate (events won / competed); (W–L) win–loss record.
To avoid confusion and double counting, these charts are updated at the conclusion of a tournament or when the player's participation has ended.

Only main-draw results in WTA Tour, Grand Slam tournaments, Fed Cup and Olympic Games are included in win–loss records.

=== Singles ===
Tournament	2006	2007	2008	2009	2010	2011	2012	2013	2014	2015	2016	2017	SR	W–L	Win%
Grand Slam tournaments
Australian Open	A	Q1	1R	2R	A	A	Q2	1R	2R	1R	A	1R	0 / 6	2–6	25%
French Open	A	3R	3R	A	A	A	Q1	1R	1R	1R	3R	A	0 / 6	6–6	50%
Wimbledon	A	1R	A	Q2	A	A	1R	4R	1R	1R	1R	A	0 / 6	3–6	33%
US Open	Q3	2R	1R	A	A	1R	Q1	3R	1R	2R	1R	A	0 / 7	4–7	36%
Win–loss	0–0	3–3	2–3	1–1	0–0	0–1	0–1	5–4	1–4	1–4	2–3	0–1	0 / 25	15–25	38%
Premier Mandatory & Premier 5 + former
Dubai / Qatar Open (Note: The first Premier 5 event of the year has switched back and forth between the Dubai Tennis Championships and the Qatar Ladies Open since 2009. Dubai was classified as a Premier 5 event from 2009 to 2011 before being succeeded by Doha for the 2012–2014 period. In 2015, Dubai regained its Premier 5 status while Doha was demoted to Premier status. The Premier 5 tournaments were reclassified as WTA 1000 tournaments in 2021.)	NMS		2R	A	A	A	A	A	2R	1R	A	A	0 / 3	2–3	40%
Indian Wells Open	A	Q1	2R	3R	A	A	A	A	1R	1R	A	A	0 / 4	2–4	33%
Miami Open	A	Q1	2R	1R	A	A	A	A	1R	2R	1R	A	0 / 5	1–5	17%
German / Madrid Open (Note: In 2009, the German Open was replaced by the Madrid Open. The Premier Mandatory tournaments were reclassified as WTA 1000 tournaments in 2021.)	A	A	1R	A	A	A	A	A	1R	A	2R	A	0 / 3	1–3	25%
Italian Open	Q1	1R	1R	1R	A	Q2	2R	1R	1R	2R	1R	A	0 / 8	3–8	27%
Canadian Open	A	A	A	A	A	A	A	A	1R	1R	A	A	0 / 2	0–2	0%
Cincinnati Open	NMS			A	A	A	A	1R	2R	3R	Q2	A	0 / 3	3–3	50%
Pan Pacific / Wuhan Open (Note: In 2014, the Pan Pacific Open was downgraded to a Premier event and replaced by the Wuhan Open. The Premier 5 tournaments were reclassified as WTA 1000 tournaments in 2021.)	A	A	A	A	A	A	A	A	2R	A	A	A	0 / 1	1–1	50%
China Open	NMS			A	A	A	A	A	A	A	A	A	0 / 0	0–0	–
Kremlin Cup (former)	A	A	Q2	NMS									0 / 0	0–0	–
Zurich Open (former)	A	1R	NH/NMS										0 / 1	0–1	0%
Win–loss	0–0	0–2	1–5	2–3	0–0	0–0	1–1	0–2	3–8	4–6	1–3	0–0	0 / 30	12–30	29%
Career statistics
	2006	2007	2008	2009	2010	2011	2012	2013	2014	2015	2016	2017	SR	W–L	Win%
Tournaments	4	14	14	6	0	3	7	15	25	21	10	1	Career total: 120		
Titles	0	0	0	0	0	0	0	0	1	1	0	0	Career total: 2		
Finals	0	0	1	0	0	0	0	0	1	2	0	0	Career total: 4		
Hard win–loss	1–2	3–5	7–8	3–4	0–0	0–2	1–2	6–6	15–15	10–13	0–4	0–1	1 / 63	46–62	43%
Clay win–loss	2–2	11–7	4–6	0–2	0–0	0–1	6–4	11–8	4–7	12–4	5–5	0–0	1 / 46	55–46	54%
Grass win–loss	0–0	0–2	0–0	0–0	0–0	0–0	0–1	3–1	0–1	0–3	0–1	0–0	0 / 9	3–9	25%
Carpet win–loss	0–0	0–0	0–1	0–0	0–0	0–0	0–0	0–0	1–1	0–0	0–0	0–0	0 / 2	1–2	33%
Overall win–loss	3–4	14–14	11–15	3–6	0–0	0–3	7–7	20–15	20–24	22–20	5–10	0–1	2 / 120	105–119	47%
Win %	43%	50%	42%	33%	–	0%	50%	57%	45%	52%	33%	0%	Career total: 47%		
Year-end ranking	123	51	80	205	478	158	123	41	56	51	144	966	$2,283,203		

=== Doubles ===
Tournament	2006	2007	2008	2009	2010	2011	2012	2013	2014	2015	2016	2017	SR	W–L	Win%
Grand Slam tournaments
Australian Open	A	A	1R	1R	A	A	A	A	2R	2R	A	2R	0 / 5	3–5	38%
French Open	A	1R	A	A	A	A	A	A	3R	3R	1R	A	0 / 4	4–4	50%
Wimbledon	A	Q1	A	A	A	A	Q1	Q2	1R	3R	A	A	0 / 2	2–2	50%
US Open	A	1R	1R	A	A	A	A	1R	1R	3R	A	A	0 / 5	2–5	29%
Win–loss	0–0	0–2	0–2	0–1	0–0	0–0	0–0	0–1	3–4	7–4	0–1	1–1	0 / 16	11–16	41%
Premier M & Premier 5
Indian Wells Open	A	A	A	A	A	A	A	A	A	QF	A	A	0 / 1	2–1	67%
Miami Open	A	A	A	A	A	A	A	A	A	2R	A	A	0 / 1	1–1	50%
Italian Open	1R	QF	1R	1R	A	A	2R	1R	1R	1R	1R	A	0 / 9	1–9	10%
Cincinnati Open	NMS			A	A	A	A	A	A	2R	A	A	0 / 1	1–1	50%
Win–loss	0–1	1–1	0–1	0–1	0–0	0–0	0–1	0–1	0–1	4–4	0–1	0–0	0 / 12	5–12	29%
Career statistics
Tournaments	3	6	3	2	0	1	4	3	8	11	2	1	Career total: 44		
Overall win–loss	0–3	4–6	0–4	0–2	0–0	0–1	1–4	2–3	8–9	16–11	1–3	1–1	0 / 44	33–47	41%
Year-end ranking	294	164	958	781	n/a	328	199	447	109	50	551	404			

== WTA Tour finals ==
=== Singles: 4 (2 titles, 2 runner-ups) ===
Legend Premier (0–1) International (2–1)	Finals by surface Hard (1–1) Clay (1–1)

Result	W–L	Date	Tournament	Tier	Surface	Opponent	Score
Loss	0–1	Feb 2008	Diamond Games Antwerp, Belgium	Tier II (Note: Includes WTA Premier and WTA International tournaments. The WTA Tier II tournaments were reclassified as WTA Premier tournaments in 2009, while the WTA Tier III tournaments, WTA Tier IV tournaments and WTA Tier V tournaments were reclassified as WTA International tournaments the same year .)	Hard (i)	(Belgium) Justine Henin	3–6, 3–6
Win	1–1	Sep 2014	Tashkent Open, Uzbekistan	International	Hard	(Serbia) Bojana Jovanovski	6–2, 7–6^{(7–4)}
Win	2–1	May 2015	Nuremberg Cup, Germany	International	Clay	(Italy) Roberta Vinci	7–6^{(7–5)}, 4–6, 6–1
Loss	2–2	Jul 2015	Gastein Ladies, Austria	International	Clay	(Australia) Samantha Stosur	6–3, 6–7^{(3–7)}, 2–6

=== Doubles: 3 (3 runner-ups) ===
Legend Premier International (0–3)	Finals by surface Hard (0–1) Clay (0–2)

Result	W–L	Date	Tournament	Tier	Surface	Partner	Opponents	Score
Loss	0–1	Jul 2007	Palermo Ladies Open, Italy	Tier IV	Clay	(Italy) Alice Canepa	(Ukraine) Mariya Koryttseva (Belarus) Darya Kustova	4–6, 1–6
Loss	0–2	Jul 2014	Bucharest Open, Romania	International	Clay	(Turkey) Çağla Büyükakçay	(Romania) Elena Bogdan (Romania) Alexandra Cadanțu	4–6, 6–3, [5–10]
Loss	0–3	Apr 2015	Katowice Open, Poland	International	Hard (i)	(Italy) Gioia Barbieri	(Belgium) Ysaline Bonaventure (Netherlands) Demi Schuurs	5–7, 6–4, [6–10]

== ITF Circuit finals ==
Legend
$100,000 tournaments
$75,000 tournaments
$50,000 tournaments
$25,000 tournaments
$10,000 tournaments

=== Singles: 19 (6 titles, 13 runner-ups) ===
Result	W–L	Date	Tournament	Tier	Surface	Opponent	Score
Loss	0–1	Oct 2003	ITF Bari, Italy	10,000	Clay	(Austria) Bettina Pirker	2–6, 5–7
Loss	0–2	Jun 2005	ITF Lenzerheide, Switzerland	10,000	Clay	(Montenegro) Danica Krstajić	2–6, 5–7
Loss	0–3	May 2006	ITF Catania, Italy	25,000	Clay	(Spain) María José Martínez Sánchez	3–6, 6–4, 4–6
Win	1–3	Jul 2006	ITF Monteroni, Italy	25,000	Clay	(Romania) Edina Gallovits-Hall	6–2, 6–1
Loss	1–4	Jul 2006	ITF Martina Franca, Italy	50,000	Clay	(Georgia (country)) Margalita Chakhnashvili	3–6, 5–7
Loss	1–5	Mar 2007	ITF Orange, United States	25,000	Hard	(United Kingdom) Naomi Cavaday	1–6, 1–6
Loss	1–6	Apr 2007	ITF Dinan, France	75,000	Clay (i)	(Slovenia) Maša Zec Peškirič	4–6, 2–6
Loss	1–7	Apr 2007	ITF Civitavecchia, Italy	25,000	Clay	(Belarus) Darya Kustova	6–3, 4–6, 4–6
Loss	1–8	Jul 2007	Internazionali di Biella, Italy	100,000	Clay	(Poland) Agnieszka Radwańska	3–6, 3–6
Loss	1–9	Oct 2010	ITF Settimo San Pietro, Italy	10,000	Clay	(Italy) Anastasia Grymalska	6–4, 2–6, 5–7
Win	2–9	Oct 2010	ITF Seville, Spain	10,000	Clay	(Venezuela) Andrea Gámiz	6–0, 6–1
Loss	2–10	Nov 2010	ITF Mallorca, Spain	10,000	Clay	(Romania) Diana Enache	4–6, 2–6
Win	3–10	Jun 2011	ITF Campobasso, Italy	25,000	Clay	(France) Alizé Lim	6–2, 6–4
Loss	3–11	Jun 2011	ITF Padova, Italy	25,000	Clay	(France) Kristina Mladenovic	6–3, 4–6, 0–6
Win	4–11	Jun 2011	ITF Rome, Italy	25,000	Clay	(France) Laura Thorpe	6–3, 6–0
Loss	4–12	Aug 2012	ITF Bagnatica, Italy	10,000	Clay	(Italy) Maria-Elena Camerin	6–7^{(5–7)}, 4–6
Win	5–12	Sep 2012	Save Cup Mestre, Italy	50,000	Clay	(Spain) Estrella Cabeza Candela	6–1, 3–6, 6–1
Loss	5–13	May 2013	Empire Slovak Open, Slovakia	75,000	Clay	(Czech Republic) Barbora Strýcová	2–6, 4–6
Win	6–13	Jun 2016	Internazionali di Brescia, Italy	50,000	Clay	(Czech Republic) Jesika Malečková	6–1, 6–2

=== Doubles: 7 (6 titles, 1 runner-up) ===
Result	W–L	Date	Tournament	Tier	Surface	Partner	Opponents	Score
Win	1–0	Sep 2004	ITF Benevento, Italy	10,000	Hard	(Italy) Giulia Gabba	(Slovakia) Martina Babáková (Czech Republic) Sandra Záhlavová	6–2, 0–1 ret.
Win	2–0	Jul 2006	Internazionali di Cuneo, Italy	50,000	Clay	(Italy) Sara Errani	(Italy) Giulia Gatto-Monticone (Belarus) Darya Kustova	6–3, 7–6^{(7–5)}
Win	3–0	Sep 2010	Save Cup, Italy	50,000	Clay	(Italy) Claudia Giovine	(Czech Republic) Eva Birnerová (Slovenia) Andreja Klepač	6–7^{(6–8)}, 7–5, [13–11]
Win	4–0	Feb 2011	ITF Rabat, Morocco	25,000	Clay	(Czech Republic) Eva Hrdinová	(Czech Republic) Iveta Gerlová (Czech Republic) Lucie Kriegsmannová	6–4, 6–1
Win	5–0	Apr 2011	ITF Pomezia, Italy	10,000	Clay	(Romania) Diana Enache	(Switzerland) Conny Perrin (Russia) Marina Shamayko	7–6^{(3)}, 6–2
Win	6–0	Feb 2012	Copa Cali, Colombia	100,000	Clay	(Luxembourg) Mandy Minella	(Romania) Alexandra Cadanțu (Romania) Raluca Olaru	6–4, 6–3
Loss	6–1	Aug 2012	ITF Monteroni, Italy	25,000	Clay	(Italy) Alice Balducci	(Italy) Federica di Sarra (Italy) Anastasia Grymalska	4–6, 7–5, [7–10]

== Head-to-head record ==
=== Top 10 win ===
Season	2016	Total
Wins	1	1

Player	Rank	Event	Surface	Rd	Score	KKR
2016
(Belarus) Victoria Azarenka	No. 5	French Open	Clay	1R	6–3, 6–7^{(6–8)}, 4–0 ret.	No. 118
