= Nuremberg Cup =

Nürnberger Versicherungscup
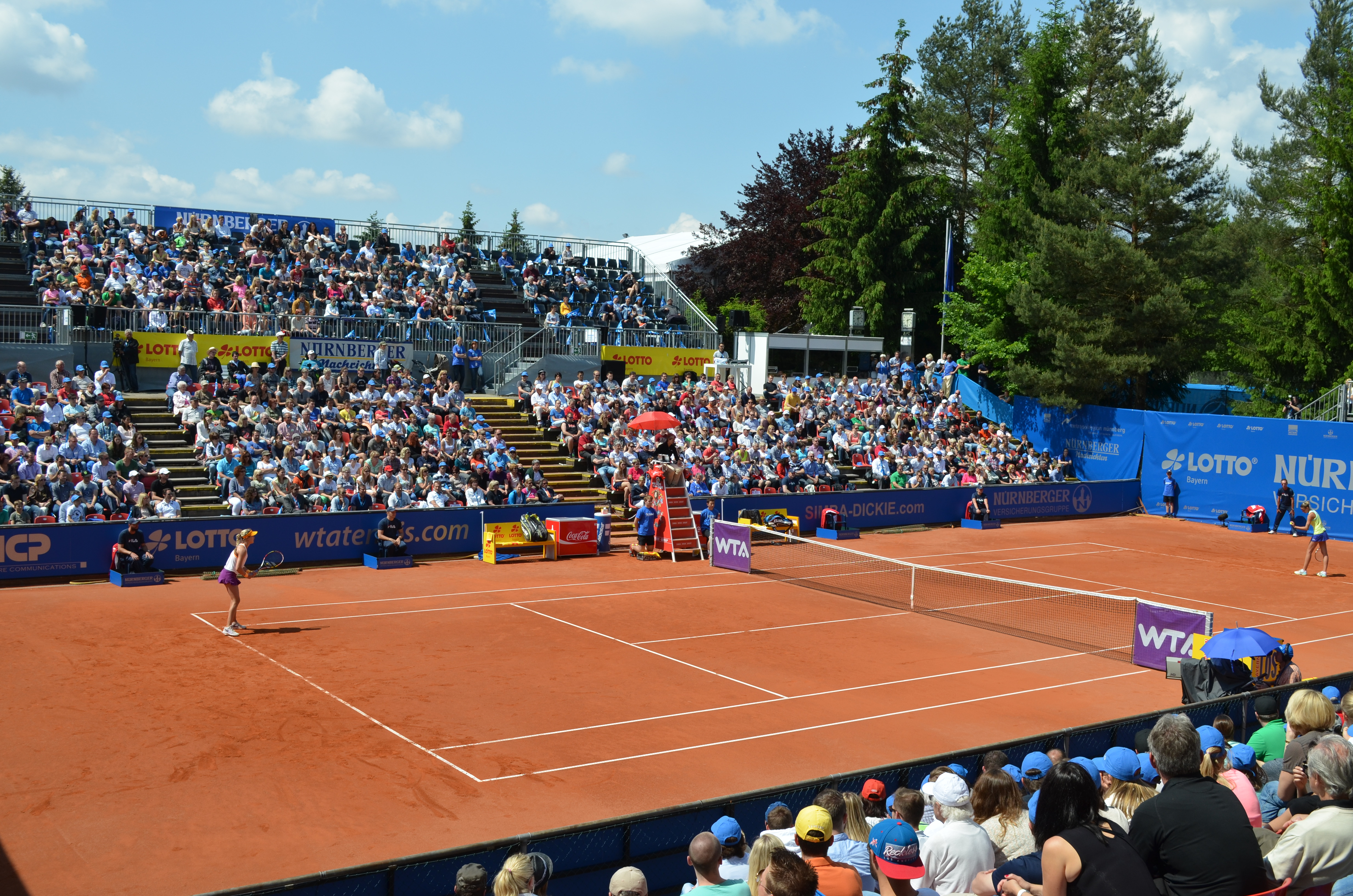

Tournament information
- Founded: 2013
- Location: Nuremberg, Bavaria; Germany
- Venue: Tennisclub 1. FC Nürnberg (2013–19)
- Category: WTA International
- Surface: Clay – outdoors (2013–19)
- Draw: 32S / 8Q / 16D
- Prize money: US$235,000 (2013)

The Nuremberg Cup was a women's professional tennis tournament held in Nuremberg, Germany. Held from 2013 until 2019, this International-level tournament was played on outdoor clay courts.

== Tournament history ==
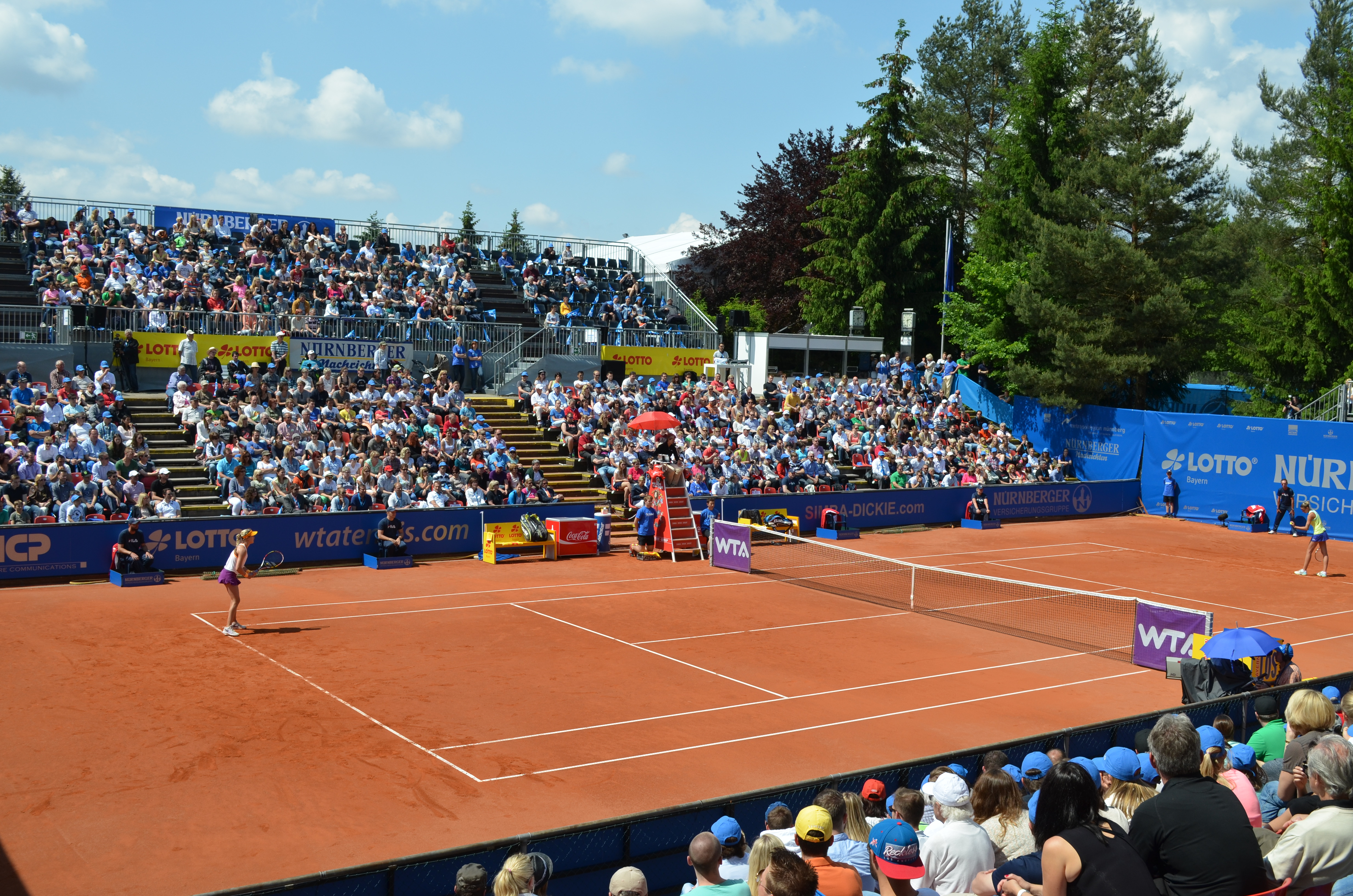
The centre court of the former clay court tournament

The Nuremberg Open was a men's tennis tournament that was played on the Grand Prix tennis circuit in 1976. The event was held in Nuremberg, West Germany and was played on indoor carpet courts. Frew McMillan won the singles title while partnering with Karl Meiler to win the doubles title.

The Nürnberger Versicherungscup (sponsored by Nürnberger Versicherungsgruppe) was a professional women's tennis tournament played on outdoor clay courts in Nuremberg. The event was affiliated with the Women's Tennis Association (WTA), and was an International-level tournament on the WTA Tour. The inaugural 2013 edition took place the week after the French Open while from 2014 to 2019, the event was scheduled the week before the French Open.

In January 2020, the tournament licence was reported to be taken over by an association around the former manager of German hockey club Kölner Haie, Oliver Mueller, after the Austrian Reichel family had retired, hence a relocation to Cologne was expected for 2021. This reestablishment in the Rhineland has not been achieved.

== Past finals ==
=== Women ===
==== Singles ====
Location	Year	Champions	Runners-up	Score
Nuremberg
Nuremberg	2013	(Romania) Simona Halep	(Germany) Andrea Petkovic	6–3, 6–3
Nuremberg	2014	(Canada) Eugenie Bouchard	(Czech Republic) Karolína Plíšková	6–2, 4–6, 6–3
Nuremberg	2015	(Italy) Karin Knapp	(Italy) Roberta Vinci	7–6^{(7–5)}, 4–6, 6–1
Nuremberg	2016	(Netherlands) Kiki Bertens	(Colombia) Mariana Duque Mariño	6–2, 6–2
Nuremberg	2017	(Netherlands) Kiki Bertens (2)	(Czech Republic) Barbora Krejčíková	6–2, 6–1
Nuremberg	2018	(Sweden) Johanna Larsson	(United States) Alison Riske	7–6^{(7–4)}, 6–4
Nuremberg	2019	(Kazakhstan) Yulia Putintseva	(Slovenia) Tamara Zidanšek	4–6, 6–4, 6–2
Cologne
Cologne	2021	Cancelled due to the COVID-19 pandemic		

==== Doubles ====
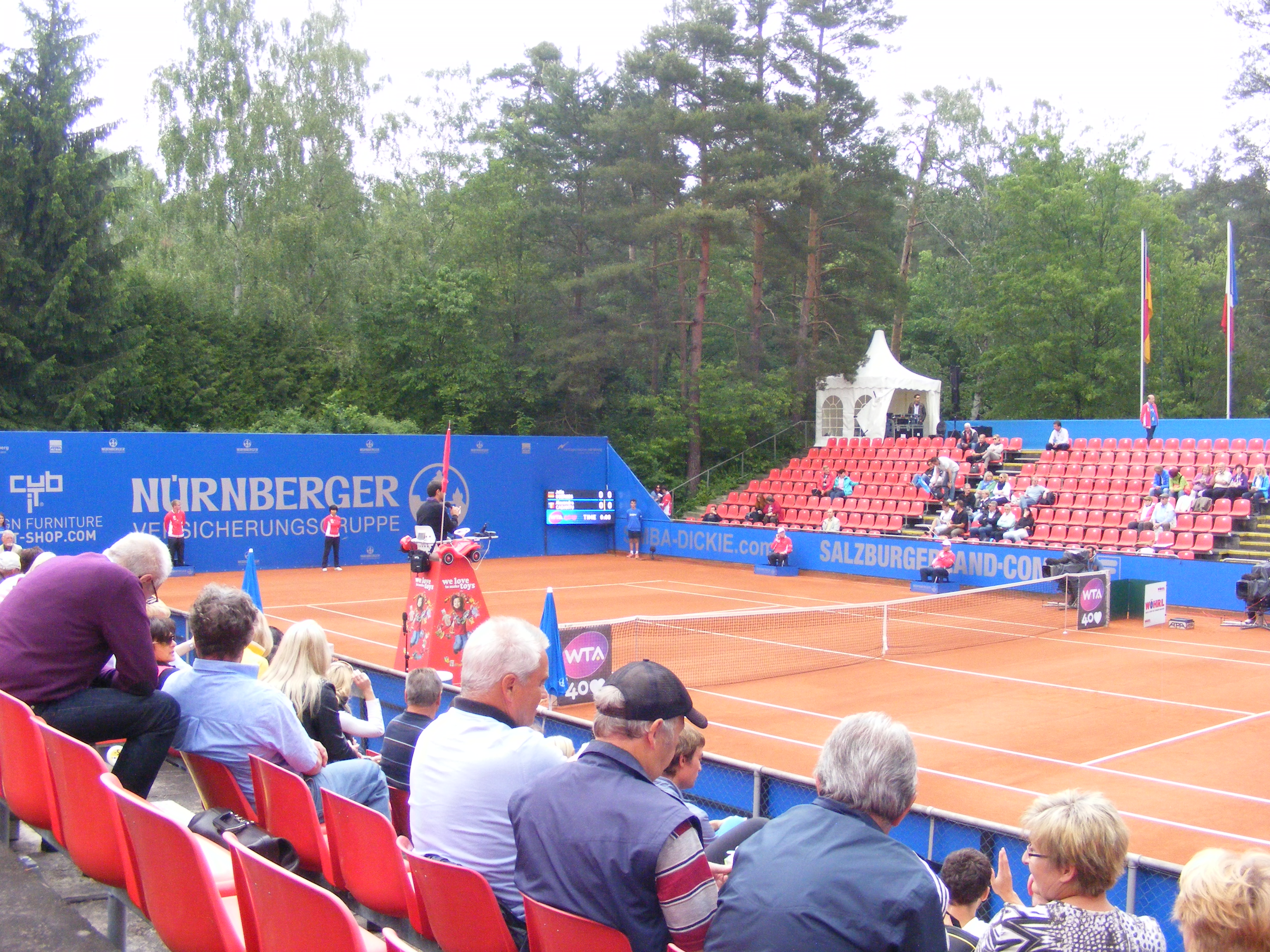
Nuremberg Cup

Location	Year	Champions	Runners-up	Score
Nuremberg
Nuremberg	2013	(Romania) Raluca Olaru (Russia) Valeria Solovyeva	(Germany) Anna-Lena Grönefeld (Czech Republic) Květa Peschke	2–6, 7–6^{(7–3)}, [11–9]
Nuremberg	2014	(Netherlands) Michaëlla Krajicek (Czech Republic) Karolína Plíšková	(Romania) Raluca Olaru (Israel) Shahar Pe'er	6–0, 4–6, [10–6]
Nuremberg	2015	(Chinese Taipei) Chan Hao-ching (Spain) Anabel Medina Garrigues	(Spain) Lara Arruabarrena (Romania) Raluca Olaru	6–4, 7–6^{(7–5)}
Nuremberg	2016	(Netherlands) Kiki Bertens (Sweden) Johanna Larsson	(Japan) Shuko Aoyama (Czech Republic) Renata Voráčová	6–3, 6–4
Nuremberg	2017	(United States) Nicole Melichar (United Kingdom) Anna Smith	(Belgium) Kirsten Flipkens (Sweden) Johanna Larsson	3–6, 6–3, [11–9]
Nuremberg	2018	(Netherlands) Demi Schuurs (Slovenia) Katarina Srebotnik	(Belgium) Kirsten Flipkens (Sweden) Johanna Larsson	3–6, 6–3, [10–7]
Nuremberg	2019	(Canada) Gabriela Dabrowski (China) Xu Yifan	(Canada) Sharon Fichman (United States) Nicole Melichar	4–6, 7–6^{(7–5)}, [10–5]
Cologne
Cologne	2021	Cancelled due to the COVID-19 pandemic		

=== Men ===
==== Singles ====
Location	Year	Champions	Runners-up	Score
Nuremberg	1976	(South Africa) Frew McMillan	(Brazil) Thomaz Koch	2–6, 6–3, 6–4

==== Doubles ====
Location	Year	Champions	Runners-up	Score
Nuremberg	1976	(South Africa) Frew McMillan (Germany) Karl Meiler	(Rhodesia) Colin Dowdeswell (Australia) Paul Kronk	7–6, 6–4
