= Nina Zander =

German tennis player (born 1990)

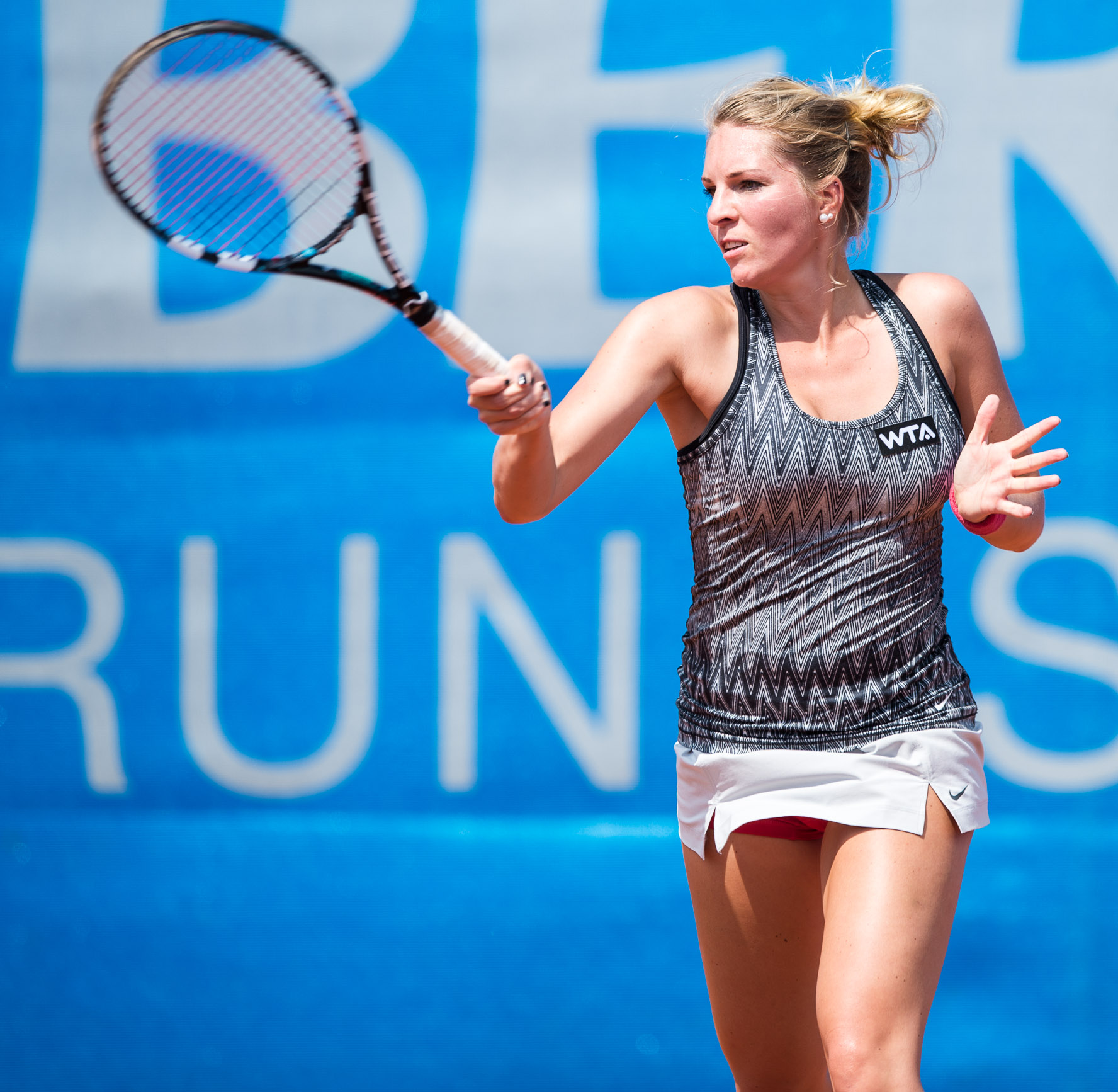
- Zander at the 2014 Nürnberger Versicherungscup
- Country (sports): Germany
- Born: 1990 (age 35–36) Nuremberg
- Height: 1.70 m (5 ft 7 in)
- Prize money: $65,393

Singles
- Career record: 191–159
- Career titles: 1 ITF
- Highest ranking: No. 279 (18 August 2014)

Doubles
- Career record: 48–62
- Career titles: 2 ITF
- Highest ranking: No. 354 (16 February 2015)

Nina Zander (born 1990) is a German former professional tennis player.

Zander was born in Nuremberg. She won one singles title and two doubles titles on the ITF Women's Circuit in her career. On 18 August 2014, she reached her best singles ranking of world No. 279. On 16 February 2015, she peaked at No. 354 in the doubles rankings.

In June 2013, Zander made her WTA Tour main-draw debut at the Nürnberger Versicherungscup, partnering Laura Siegemund in doubles. They lost to Eva Hrdinová and María Irigoyen in the first round.

== ITF finals ==
=== Singles (1–6) ===
Legend $50,000 tournaments $25,000 tournaments $10,000 tournaments	Finals by surface Hard (0–2) Clay (0–2) Carpet (1–2)

Outcome	No.	Date	Tournament	Surface	Opponent	Score
Runner-up	1.	15 March 2010	Wetzikon, Switzerland	Carpet (i)	(Switzerland) Amra Sadiković	5–7, 5–7
Runner-up	2.	17 January 2011	Stuttgart, Germany	Hard (i)	(Slovakia) Jana Čepelová	4–6, 4–6
Winner	1.	21 February 2011	Zell am Harmersbach, Germany	Carpet (i)	(Czech Republic) Eva Hrdinová	6–7^{(3–7)}, 7–5, 6–1
Runner-up	3.	19 August 2013	Enschede, Netherlands	Clay	(Germany) Tayisiya Morderger	4–6, 7–6^{(7–3)}, 2–6
Runner-up	4.	2 September 2013	Huy, Belgium	Clay	(Belgium) Déborah Kerfs	4–6, 4–6
Runner-up	5.	11 November 2013	Zawada, Poland	Carpet (i)	(Czech Republic) Kateřina Siniaková	1–6, 3–6
Runner-up	6.	6 April 2015	Barnstaple, United Kingdom	Hard (i)	(Czech Republic) Kristýna Plíšková	3–6, 2–6

=== Doubles (2–4) ===
Legend $25,000 tournaments $10,000 tournaments	Finals by surface Hard (1–0) Clay (1–4)

Outcome	No.	Date	Tournament	Surface	Partner	Opponents	Score
Runner-up	1.	7 June 2010	Apeldoorn, Netherlands	Clay	(Germany) Carolin Daniels	(Belgium) Elyne Boeykens (Netherlands) Leonie Mekel	6–4, 3–6, [4–10]
Runner-up	2.	16 May 2011	Santa Coloma de Farners, Spain	Clay	(Switzerland) Viktorija Golubic	(Spain) Eva Fernández Brugués (Spain) Inés Ferrer Suárez	3–6, 7–6^{(7–3)}, [4–10]
Winner	1.	22 July 2013	Tampere, Finland	Clay	(Germany) Julia Wachaczyk	(Finland) Emma Laine (Finland) Piia Suomalainen	6–4, 6–4
Runner-up	3.	2 September 2013	Huy, Belgium	Clay	(Germany) Julia Wachaczyk	(Germany) Franziska König (Australia) Karolina Wlodarczak	2–6, 4–6
Runner-up	4.	16 September 2013	Saint-Malo, France	Clay	(Liechtenstein) Kathinka von Deichmann	(Bulgaria) Elitsa Kostova (Argentina) Florencia Molinero	2–6, 4–6
Winner	2.	22 September 2014	Clermont-Ferrand, France	Hard (i)	(France) Irina Ramialison	(France) Fanny Caramaro (France) Victoria Muntean	6–1, 6–0
