= Valeriya Solovyeva =

Russian tennis player

Valeriya Solovyeva Валерия Соловьёва
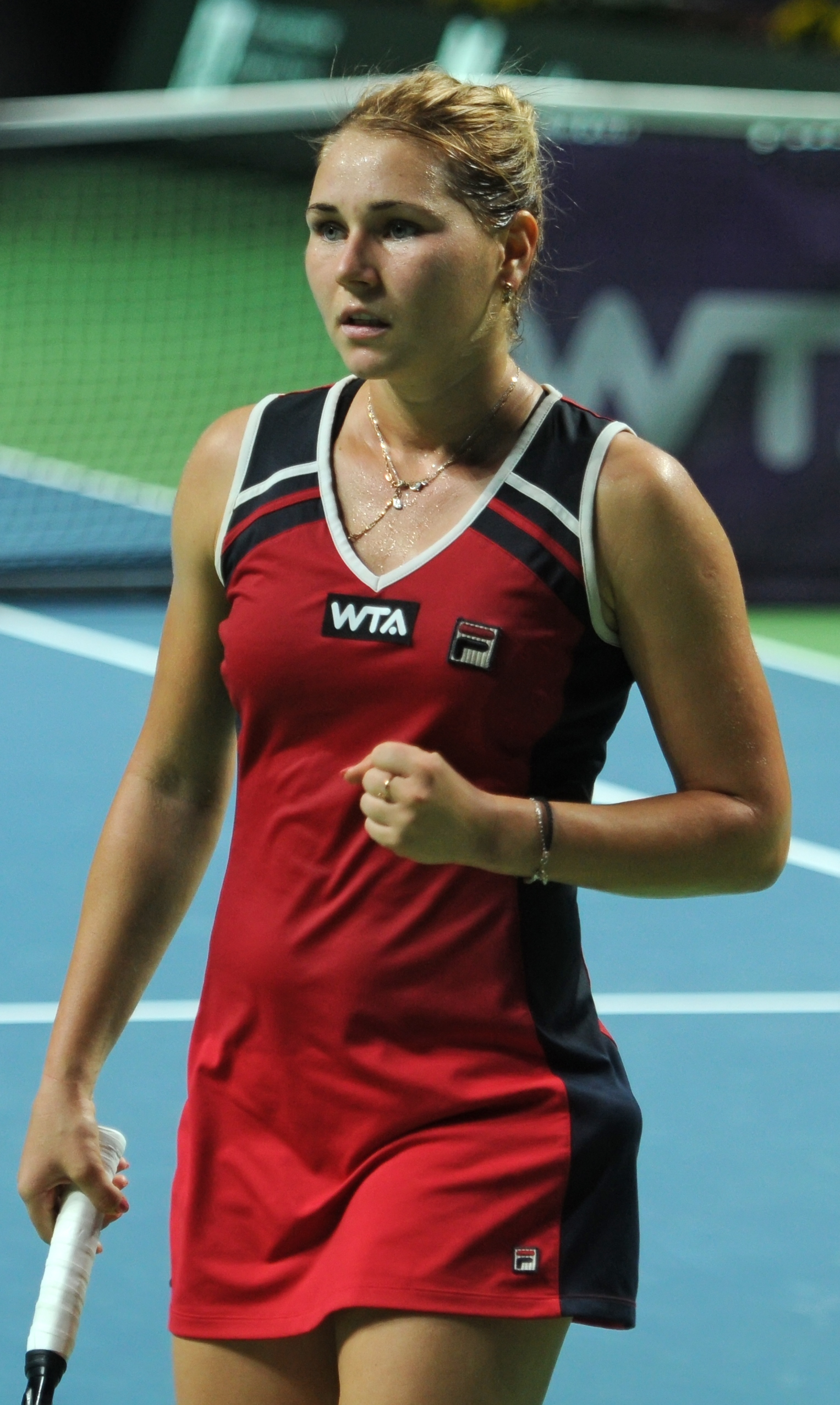
- Solovyeva at the 2014 Kremlin Cup
- Full name: Valeriya Alexandrovna Solovyeva
- Country (sports): Russia
- Born: 3 November 1992 (age 33) Saratov, Russia
- Height: 1.68 m (5 ft 6 in)
- Coach: Nick Saviano
- Prize money: US$ 234,692

Singles
- Career record: 222–159
- Career titles: 3 ITF
- Highest ranking: No. 163 (27 May 2013)

Grand Slam singles results
- Australian Open: Q3 (2013)
- French Open: Q1 (2013)
- Wimbledon: Q1 (2013)
- US Open: Q2 (2013)

Doubles
- Career record: 160–94
- Career titles: 2 WTA, 15 ITF
- Highest ranking: No. 67 (15 July 2013)

Grand Slam doubles results
- Australian Open: 1R (2014)
- French Open: 1R (2013)
- Wimbledon: 1R (2013)

Team competitions
- Fed Cup: 1–1

Valeriya Alexandrovna Solovyeva (Russian: Валерия Александровна Соловьёва; born 3 November 1992) is a Russian former professional tennis player.

Solovyeva won two doubles titles on the WTA Tour, and in addition three singles and 15 doubles titles on the ITF Women's Circuit. On 27 May 2013, she reached her best singles ranking of world No. 163. On 15 July 2013, she peaked at No. 67 in the WTA doubles rankings.

Playing for Russia in the Fed Cup, Solovyeva has a win–loss record of 1–1. She made her debut in February 2014, partnering Irina Khromacheva in doubles, losing the dead rubber in straight sets to Ashleigh Barty and Casey Dellacqua.

== WTA Tour finals ==
=== Doubles: 5 (2 titles, 3 runner-ups) ===
Legend Premier M & Premier 5 Premier International (2–3)	Finals by surface Hard (1–1) Clay (1–2)

Result	W–L	Date	Tournament	Surface	Partner	Opponents	Score
Win	1–0	Jul 2012	Baku Cup, Azerbaijan	Hard	(Ukraine) Irina Buryachok	(Czech Republic) Eva Birnerová (Italy) Alberta Brianti	6–3, 6–2
Loss	1–1	Jan 2013	Shenzhen Open, China	Hard	(Ukraine) Irina Buryachok	(Chinese Taipei) Chan Hao-ching (Chinese Taipei) Chan Yung-jan	0–6, 5–7
Loss	1–2	Apr 2013	Katowice Open, Poland	Clay (i)	(Romania) Raluca Olaru	(Spain) Lara Arruabarrena (Spain) Lourdes Domínguez Lino	4–6, 5–7
Win	2–2	Jun 2013	Nuremberg Cup, Germany	Clay	(Romania) Raluca Olaru	(Germany) Anna-Lena Grönefeld (Czech Republic) Květa Peschke	2–6, 7–6^{(7–3)}, [11–9]
Loss	2–3	May 2014	Estoril Open, Portugal	Clay	(Czech Republic) Eva Hrdinová	(Zimbabwe) Cara Black (India) Sania Mirza	4–6, 3–6

== ITF Circuit finals ==
=== Singles: 6 (3–3) ===
Legend $25,000 tournaments $10,000 tournaments	Finals by surface Hard (1–1) Clay (2–2)

Result	No.	Date	Tournament	Surface	Opponent	Score
Win	1.	26 July 2010	ITF Bree, Belgium	Clay	(France) Myrtille Georges	5–7, 6–4, 6–3
Loss	1.	1 August 2011	ITF Moscow, Russia	Clay	(Ukraine) Valentyna Ivakhnenko	1–6, 3–6
Loss	2.	25 June 2012	ITF Ystad, Sweden	Clay	(Germany) Carina Witthöft	2–6, 1–6
Win	2.	9 May 2016	ITF Naples, United States	Clay	(United States) Kayla Day	6–4, 6–0
Loss	3.	13 June 2016	ITF Sumter, United States	Hard	(United States) CiCi Bellis	1–6, 3–6
Win	3.	20 June 2016	ITF Baton Rouge, United States	Hard	(United States) Jennifer Elie	5–7, 6–3, 6–0

=== Doubles: 23 (15–8) ===
Legend $100,000 tournaments $50,000 tournaments $25,000 tournaments $15,000 tournaments	Finals by surface Hard (4–6) Clay (11–1) Carpet (0–1)

Result	No.	Date	Tournament	Surface	Partner	Opponents	Score
Win	1.	2 August 2010	ITF Moscow, Russia	Clay	(Russia) Nadejda Guskova	(Serbia) Teodora Mirčić (Australia) Marija Mirkovic	7–6^{(5)}, 6–3
Loss	1.	13 September 2010	Royal Cup, Montenegro	Clay	(Ukraine) Maryna Zanevska	(Romania) Irina-Camelia Begu (Romania) Mihaela Buzărnescu	7–5, 5–7, [10–12]
Win	2.	18 April 2011	Dothan Pro Classic, US	Clay	(Slovakia) Lenka Wienerová	(Canada) Heidi El Tabakh (United States) Alison Riske	6–3, 6–4
Win	3.	16 May 2011	ITF Moscow, Russia	Clay	(Russia) Nadejda Guskova	(Poland) Justyna Jegiołka (Ukraine) Veronika Kapshay	6–3, 7–6^{(2)}
Loss	2.	6 February 2012	ITF Rancho Mirage, US	Hard	(Slovakia) Lenka Wienerová	(Georgia (country)) Ekaterine Gorgodze (Georgia (country)) Sofia Shapatava	2–6, 6–3, [6–10]
Loss	3.	13 February 2012	ITF Surprise, United States	Hard	(Romania) Mihaela Buzărnescu	(United States) Maria Sanchez (United States) Yasmin Schnack	4–6, 3–6
Win	4.	18 June 2012	ITF Kristinehamn, Sweden	Clay	(Russia) Elena Bovina	(Belarus) Viktoryia Kisialeva (Belarus) Ilona Kremen	6–2, 6–2
Win	5.	30 July 2012	ITF Moscow, Russia	Clay	(Russia) Arina Rodionova	(Russia) Eugeniya Pashkova (Ukraine) Anastasiya Vasylyeva	6–3, 6–3
Loss	4.	17 September 2012	ITF Yoshkar-Ola, Russia	Hard (i)	(Ukraine) Irina Buryachok	(Russia) Margarita Gasparyan (Ukraine) Veronika Kapshay	4–6, 6–2, [9–11]
Loss	5.	12 November 2012	ITF Helsinki, Finland	Carpet (i)	(Ukraine) Irina Buryachok	(Ukraine) Lyudmyla Kichenok (Ukraine) Nadiia Kichenok	3–6, 3–6
Loss	6.	17 December 2012	Ankara Cup, Turkey	Hard (i)	(Ukraine) Irina Buryachok	(Poland) Magda Linette (Poland) Katarzyna Piter	2–6, 2–6
Loss	7.	18 February 2013	ITF Moscow, Russia	Hard (i)	(Ukraine) Maryna Zanevska	(Russia) Margarita Gasparyan (Russia) Polina Monova	4–6, 6–2, [5–10]
Loss	8.	22 July 2013	President's Cup, Kazakhstan	Hard	(Russia) Nina Bratchikova	(Ukraine) Lyudmyla Kichenok (Ukraine) Nadiia Kichenok	2–6, 2–6
Win	6.	21 October 2013	ITF Casablanca, Morocco	Clay	(Poland) Paula Kania	(Chile) Cecilia Costa Melgar (Italy) Anastasia Grymalska	7–6^{(3)}, 6–4
Win	7.	4 August 2014	Ladies Open Hechingen, Germany	Clay	(Romania) Elena Bogdan	(Germany) Carolin Daniels (Germany) Antonia Lottner	6–3, 6–1
Win	8.	14 December 2015	ITF Bangkok, Thailand	Hard	(Russia) Irina Khromacheva	(Indonesia) Jessy Rompies (Thailand) Nungnadda Wannasuk	5–7, 6–4, [12–10]
Win	9.	21 December 2015	ITF Bangkok, Thailand	Hard	(Russia) Irina Khromacheva	(South Korea) Choi Ji-hee (Thailand) Peangtarn Plipuech	6–3, 4–6, [10–5]
Win	10.	21 March 2016	ITF Naples, United States	Clay	(Ukraine) Maryna Zanevska	(United States) Sophie Chang (Netherlands) Quirine Lemoine	7–5, 6–0
Win	11.	14 October 2017	ITF Pula, Italy	Clay	(Romania) Elena Bogdan	(Croatia) Tereza Mrdeža (Japan) Akiko Omae	7–6^{(7)}, 5–7, [11–9]
Win	12.	17 February 2018	ITF Sharm El Sheikh, Egypt	Hard	(Russia) Anna Morgina	(Germany) Constanze Stepan (Poland) Iga Świątek	6–4, 6–2
Win	13.	24 February 2018	ITF Sharm El Sheikh, Egypt	Hard	(Russia) Martina Colmegna	(Chinese Taipei) Lee Pei-chi (India) Pranjala Yadlapalli	6–2, 6–3
Win	14.	31 March 2018	ITF Pula, Italy	Clay	(Russia) Valentyna Ivakhnenko	(Italy) Anastasia Grymalska (Czech Republic) Anastasia Zarycká	6–3, 3–6, [10–5]
Win	15.	7 April 2018	ITF Pula, Italy	Clay	(Germany) Anna Zaja	(France) Manon Arcangioli (Slovakia) Chantal Škamlová	7–5, 6–3

== Fed Cup participation ==
=== Doubles ===
Edition	Stage	Date	Location	Against	Surface	Partner	Opponents	W/L	Score
2014 Fed Cup; World Group	R1	9 February 2014	Hobart, Australia	Australia	Hard	(Russia) Irina Khromacheva	(Australia) Ashleigh Barty (Australia) Casey Dellacqua	L	1–6, 3–6
2014 Fed Cup; World Group play-offs	P/O	20 April 2014	Sochi, Russia	Argentina	Clay (i)	(Russia) Elena Vesnina	(Argentina) Victoria Bosio (Argentina) Nadia Podoroska	W	6–2, 6–1

== Junior Grand Slam tournament finals ==
=== Doubles ===
Outcome	Year	Championship	Surface	Partner	Opponents	Score
Winner	2009	US Open	Hard	(Ukraine) Maryna Zanevska	(Romania) Elena Bogdan (Thailand) Noppawan Lertcheewakarn	1–6, 6–3, [10–7]
