= Kiki Bertens career statistics =

Career finals
Discipline	Type	Won	Lost	Total
Singles	Grand Slam	–	–	–
Singles	WTA Finals (Note: Formerly known as: Virginia Slims Championships (until 1995); WTA Tour Championships (until 2014))	–	–	–
Singles	WTA Elite (Note: Elite tier: WTA Tournament of Champions (2009–14); WTA Elite Trophy (2015–present))	0	1	1
Singles	WTA 1000 (Note: Formerly known as: Category 4 & 5 & 6 (until 1990); Tier I (until 2009); WTA Premier Mandatory and 5 (until 2021))	2	1	3
Singles	WTA 500 (Note: Formerly known as: Category 3 (until 1990); Tier II (until 2009); WTA Premier (until 2021))	3	0	3
Singles	WTA 250 (Note: Formerly known as: Category 1 & 2 (until 1990); Tier III & IV & V (until 2009); WTA International (until 2021))	5	3	8
Singles	Olympics	–	–	–
Singles	Total	10	5	15
Doubles	Grand Slam	–	–	–
Doubles	WTA Finals	0	1	1
Doubles	WTA Elite	–	–	–
Doubles	WTA 1000	–	–	–
Doubles	WTA 500	1	1	2
Doubles	WTA 250	9	4	13
Doubles	Olympics	–	–	–
Doubles	Total	10	6	16

This is a list of the main career statistics of professional Dutch tennis player Kiki Bertens.

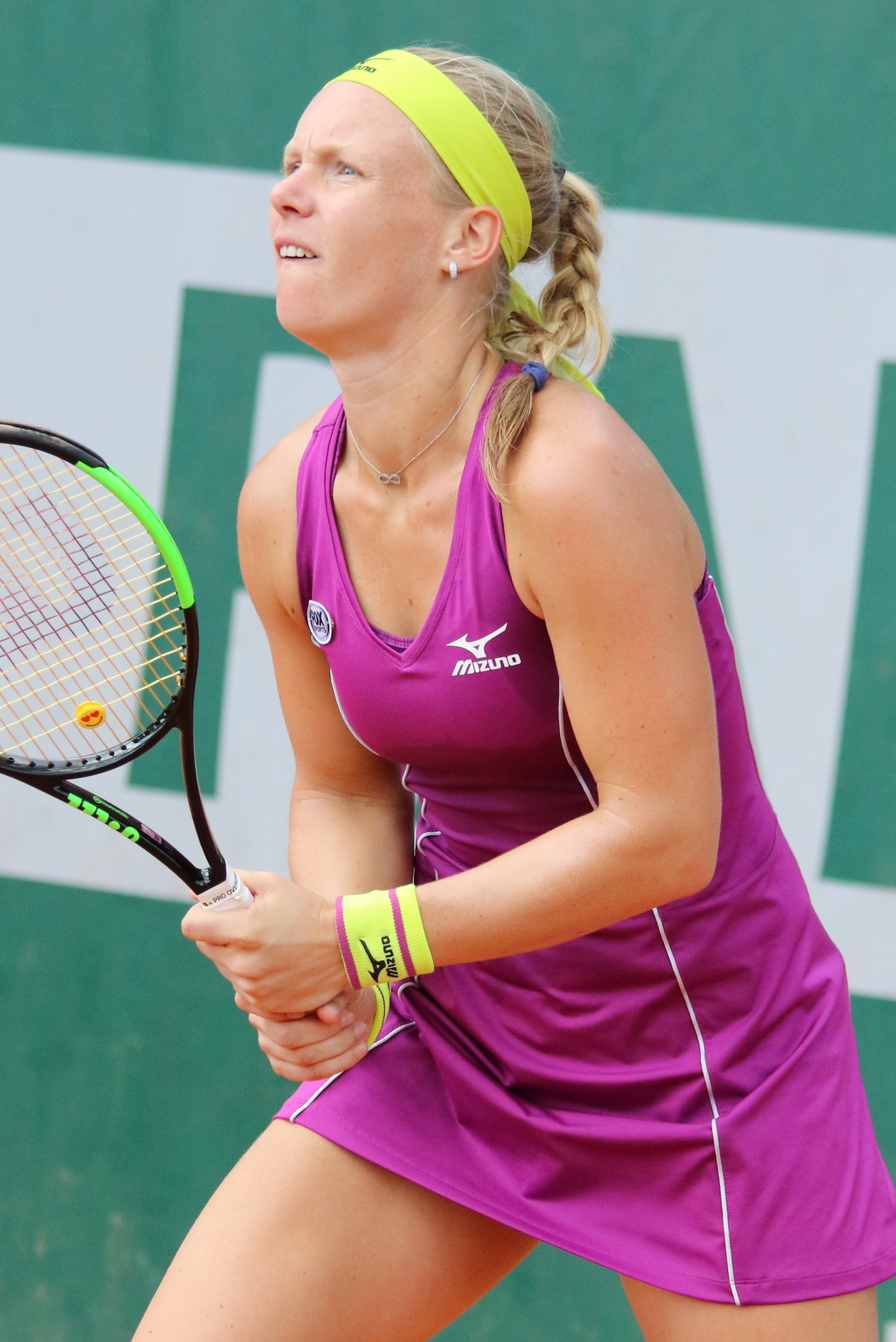
Bertens at the 2018 French Open

== Performance timelines ==
Key
W	F	SF	QF	#R	RR	Q#	P#	DNQ	A	Z#	PO	G	S	B	NMS	NTI	P	NH

(W) winner; (F) finalist; (SF) semifinalist; (QF) quarterfinalist; (#R) rounds 4, 3, 2, 1; (RR) round-robin stage; (Q#) qualification round; (P#) preliminary round; (DNQ) did not qualify; (A) absent; (Z#) Davis/Fed Cup Zonal Group (with number indication) or (PO) play-off; (G) gold, (S) silver or (B) bronze Olympic/Paralympic medal; (NMS) not a Masters tournament; (NTI) not a Tier I tournament; (P) postponed; (NH) not held; (SR) strike rate (events won / competed); (W–L) win–loss record.
To avoid confusion and double counting, these charts are updated at the conclusion of a tournament or when the player's participation has ended.

Only main-draw results in WTA Tour, Grand Slam tournaments, Billie Jean King Cup (Fed Cup), Hopman Cup and Olympic Games are included in win–loss records.

=== Singles ===
Current through Tennis at the 2020 Summer Olympics.

Tournament	2011	2012	2013	2014	2015	2016	2017	2018	2019	2020	2021	SR	W–L	Win %
Grand Slam tournaments
Australian Open	A	Q2	1R	1R	2R	1R	1R	3R	2R	4R	A	0 / 8	7–8	47%
French Open	Q1	1R	1R	4R	1R	SF	2R	3R	2R	4R	1R	0 / 10	15–10	60%
Wimbledon	A	2R	1R	Q1	1R	3R	1R	QF	3R	NH	1R	0 / 8	9–8	53%
US Open	Q1	2R	1R	1R	2R	1R	1R	3R	3R	A	A	0 / 8	6–8	43%
Win–loss	0–0	2–3	0–4	3–3	2–4	7–4	1–4	10–4	6–4	6–2	0–2	0 / 34	37–34	52%
Year-end championships
WTA Finals	did not qualify							SF	RR	NH	DNQ	0 / 2	3–3	50%
WTA Elite Trophy	did not qualify					RR	DNQ	A	F	NH	DNQ	0 / 2	3–3	50%
National representation
Summer Olympics	NH	A	not held			1R	not held				1R	0 / 2	0–2	0%
Billie Jean King Cup	Z1	Z1	A	Z1	PO	SF	1R	A	A	PO	A	0 / 2	19–2	90%
WTA 1000
Dubai / Qatar Open (Note: The first Premier 5 event of the year has switched back and forth between the Dubai Tennis Championships and the Qatar Total Open since 2009. Dubai was classified as a Premier 5 event from 2009 to 2011 before being succeeded by Doha for the 2012–2014 period. In 2015, Dubai regained its Premier 5 status while Doha was demoted to Premier status. The Premier 5 tournaments were reclassified as WTA 1000 tournaments in 2021.)	A	A	A	A	A	A	1R	A	2R	3R	2R	0 / 4	1–4	20%
Indian Wells Open	A	A	2R	A	1R	1R	3R	2R	4R	NH	A	0 / 6	6–7	46%
Miami Open	A	A	2R	2R	1R	3R	2R	3R	4R	NH	2R	0 / 8	7–8	47%
Madrid Open	A	A	1R	A	A	A	QF	F	W	NH	2R	1 / 5	15–4	79%
Italian Open	A	A	2R	A	A	1R	SF	1R	SF	2R	A	0 / 6	7–6	54%
Canadian Open	A	2R	2R	1R	A	A	A	QF	3R	NH	A	0 / 5	6–5	55%
Cincinnati Open	A	1R	A	Q1	A	1R	2R	W	2R	A	A	1 / 5	7–4	64%
Pan Pacific / Wuhan Open (Note: In 2014, the Pan Pacific Open was downgraded to a Premier event and replaced by the Wuhan Open. The Premier 5 tournaments were reclassified as WTA 1000 tournaments in 2021.)	A	A	A	A	A	A	2R	2R	3R	not held		0 / 3	3–3	50%
China Open	A	A	A	A	A	A	1R	3R	SF	not held		0 / 3	6–3	67%
Career statistics
	2011	2012	2013	2014	2015	2016	2017	2018	2019	2020	2021	SR	W–L	Win %
Tournaments	1	13	19	14	17	20	28	25	28	7	8	Career total: 180		
Titles	0	1	0	0	0	1	2	3	2	1	0	Career total: 10		
Finals	0	1	0	0	0	2	2	4	5	1	0	Career total: 15		
Hard win–loss	0–0	5–7	8–9	5–10	3–12	9–14	8–17	26–15	29–18	10–3	0–4	4 / 110	103–109	49%
Clay win–loss	0–0	5–3	6–8	6–4	4–4	19–5	24–6	15–5	17–5	5–3	2–2	6 / 51	103–45	70%
Grass win–loss	0–1	1–2	0–2	0–0	3–2	2–1	0–3	5–3	9–3	0–0	0–2	0 / 19	20–19	51%
Overall win–loss	0–1	11–12	14–19	11–14	10–18	30–20	32–26	46–23	55–26	15–6	2–8	10 / 180	226–173	57%
Win (%)	0%	48%	42%	44%	36%	60%	55%	67%	68%	71%	20%	Career total: 57%		
Year-end ranking	184	63	87	69	101	22	31	9	9	9	NR	$11,425,132		

=== Doubles ===
Tournament	2012	2013	2014	2015	2016	2017	2018	2019	2020	2021	SR	W–L
Grand Slam tournaments
Australian Open	A	1R	1R	QF	1R	2R	1R	A	A	A	0 / 6	4–6
French Open	1R	1R	A	1R	QF	3R	3R	A	A	A	0 / 6	7–6
Wimbledon	A	A	A	1R	2R	1R	3R	A	NH	1R	0 / 5	3–5
US Open	1R	2R	1R	3R	2R	3R	2R	A	A	A	0 / 7	7–7
Win–loss	0–2	1–3	0–2	5–4	5–4	5–4	5–4	0–0	0–0	0–1	0 / 24	21–24
Year-end championships
WTA Finals	did not qualify					F	DNQ		NH	DNQ	0 / 1	2–1
Career statistics
Titles	0	0	0	2	3	4	1	0	0	0	Career total: 10	
Finals	0	0	0	3	4	6	2	0	1	0	Career total: 16	
Year-end ranking	296	326	251	38	37	19	43	178	116	99		

== Significant finals ==
=== Year-end championships ===
==== Doubles: 1 (runner-up) ====
Result	Year	Tournament	Surface	Partner	Opponents	Score
Loss	2017	WTA Finals, Singapore	Hard (i)	(Sweden) Johanna Larsson	(Hungary) Tímea Babos (Czech Republic) Andrea Hlaváčková	6–4, 4–6, [5–10]

=== WTA Elite Trophy ===
==== Singles: 1 (runner-up) ====
Result	Year	Venue	Surface	Opponent	Score
Loss	2019	Elite Trophy, Zhuhai	Hard (i)	(Belarus) Aryna Sabalenka	4–6, 2–6

=== WTA 1000 ===
==== Singles: 3 (2 titles, 1 runner-up) ====
Result	Year	Tournament	Surface	Opponent	Score
Loss	2018	Madrid Open	Clay	(Czech Republic) Petra Kvitová	6–7^{(6–8)}, 6–4, 3–6
Win	2018	Cincinnati Open	Hard	(Romania) Simona Halep	2–6, 7–6^{(8–6)}, 6–2
Win	2019	Madrid Open	Clay	(Romania) Simona Halep	6–4, 6–4

== WTA Tour finals ==
=== Singles: 15 (10 titles, 5 runner-ups) ===
Legend WTA Elite (0–1) WTA 1000 (Premier 5 / Premier M) (2–1) WTA 500 (Premier) (3–0) WTA 250 (International) (5–3)	Finals by surface Hard (4–1) Clay (6–3) Grass (0–1)

Result	W–L	Date	Tournament	Tier	Surface	Opponent	Score
Win	1–0	Apr 2012	Morocco Open, Morocco	International	Clay	(Spain) Laura Pous Tió	7–5, 6–0
Win	2–0	May 2016	Nuremberg Cup, Germany	International	Clay	(Colombia) Mariana Duque Mariño	6–2, 6–2
Loss	2–1	Jul 2016	Swiss Open, Switzerland	International	Clay	(Switzerland) Viktorija Golubic	6–4, 3–6, 4–6
Win	3–1	May 2017	Nuremberg Cup, Germany (2)	International	Clay	(Czech Republic) Barbora Krejčíková	6–2, 6–1
Win	4–1	Jul 2017	Swiss Open, Switzerland	International	Clay	(Estonia) Anett Kontaveit	6–4, 3–6, 6–1
Win	5–1	Apr 2018	Charleston Open, United States	Premier	Clay	(Germany) Julia Görges	6–2, 6–1
Loss	5–2	May 2018	Madrid Open, Spain	Premier M	Clay	(Czech Republic) Petra Kvitová	6–7^{(6–8)}, 6–4, 3–6
Win	6–2	Aug 2018	Cincinnati Open, United States	Premier 5	Hard	(Romania) Simona Halep	2–6, 7–6^{(8–6)}, 6–2
Win	7–2	Sep 2018	Korea Open, South Korea	International	Hard	(Australia) Ajla Tomljanović	7–6^{(7–2)}, 4–6, 6–2
Win	8–2	Feb 2019	St. Petersburg Trophy, Russia	Premier	Hard (i)	(Croatia) Donna Vekić	7–6^{(7–2)}, 6–4
Win	9–2	May 2019	Madrid Open, Spain	Premier M	Clay	(Romania) Simona Halep	6–4, 6–4
Loss	9–3	Jun 2019	Rosmalen Open, Netherlands	International	Grass	(United States) Alison Riske	6–0, 6–7^{(3–7)}, 5–7
Loss	9–4	Jul 2019	Palermo Ladies Open, Italy	International	Clay	(Switzerland) Jil Teichmann	6–7^{(3–7)}, 2–6
Loss	9–5	Oct 2019	WTA Elite Trophy, China	Elite	Hard (i)	(Belarus) Aryna Sabalenka	4–6, 2–6
Win	10–5	Feb 2020	St. Petersburg Trophy, Russia (2)	Premier	Hard (i)	(Kazakhstan) Elena Rybakina	6–1, 6–3

=== Doubles: 16 (10 titles, 6 runner-ups) ===
Legend WTA Finals (0–1) WTA 500 (Premier) (1–1) WTA 250 (International) (9–4)	Finals by surface Hard (7–4) Grass (0–2) Clay (3–0)

Result	W–L	Date	Tournament	Tier	Surface	Partner	Opponents	Score
Win	1–0	Jan 2015	Hobart International, Australia	International	Hard	(Sweden) Johanna Larsson	(Russia) Vitalia Diatchenko (Romania) Monica Niculescu	7–5, 6–3
Win	2–0	Jul 2015	Swedish Open, Sweden	International	Clay	(Sweden) Johanna Larsson	(Germany) Tatjana Maria (Ukraine) Olga Savchuk	7–5, 6–4
Loss	2–1	Sep 2015	Korea Open, South Korea	International	Hard	(Sweden) Johanna Larsson	(Spain) Lara Arruabarrena (Slovenia) Andreja Klepač	6–2, 3–6, [6–10]
Loss	2–2	Feb 2016	Mexican Open, Mexico	International	Hard	(Sweden) Johanna Larsson	(Spain) Anabel Medina Garrigues (Spain) Arantxa Parra Santonja	0–6, 4–6
Win	3–2	May 2016	Nuremberg Cup, Germany	International	Clay	(Sweden) Johanna Larsson	(Japan) Shuko Aoyama (Czech Republic) Renata Voráčová	6–3, 6–4
Win	4–2	Oct 2016	Linz Open, Austria	International	Hard (i)	(Sweden) Johanna Larsson	(Germany) Anna-Lena Grönefeld (Czech Republic) Květa Peschke	4–6, 6–2, [10–7]
Win	5–2	Oct 2016	Luxembourg Open, Luxembourg	International	Hard (i)	(Sweden) Johanna Larsson	(Romania) Monica Niculescu (Romania) Patricia Maria Țig	4–6, 7–5, [11–9]
Win	6–2	Jan 2017	Auckland Open, New Zealand	International	Hard	(Sweden) Johanna Larsson	(Netherlands) Demi Schuurs (Czech Republic) Renata Voráčová	6–2, 6–2
Loss	6–3	Jun 2017	Rosmalen Open, Netherlands	International	Grass	(Netherlands) Demi Schuurs	(Slovakia) Dominika Cibulková (Belgium) Kirsten Flipkens	6–4, 4–6, [6–10]
Win	7–3	Jul 2017	Swiss Open, Switzerland	International	Clay	(Sweden) Johanna Larsson	(Switzerland) Viktorija Golubic (Serbia) Nina Stojanović	7–6^{(7–4)}, 4–6, [10–7]
Win	8–3	Sep 2017	Korea Open, South Korea	International	Hard	(Sweden) Johanna Larsson	(Thailand) Luksika Kumkhum (Thailand) Peangtarn Plipuech	6–4, 6–1
Win	9–3	Oct 2017	Linz Open, Austria (2)	International	Hard (i)	(Sweden) Johanna Larsson	(Russia) Natela Dzalamidze (Switzerland) Xenia Knoll	3–6, 6–3, [10–4]
Loss	9–4	Oct 2017	WTA Finals, Singapore	Finals	Hard (i)	(Sweden) Johanna Larsson	(Hungary) Tímea Babos (Czech Republic) Andrea Hlaváčková	6–4, 4–6, [5–10]
Win	10–4	Jan 2018	Brisbane International, Australia	Premier	Hard	(Netherlands) Demi Schuurs	(Slovenia) Andreja Klepač (Spain) María José Martínez Sánchez	7–5, 6–2
Loss	10–5	Jun 2018	Rosmalen Open, Netherlands	International	Grass	(Belgium) Kirsten Flipkens	(Belgium) Elise Mertens (Netherlands) Demi Schuurs	3–3 ret.
Loss	10–6	Jan 2020	Brisbane International, Australia	Premier	Hard	(Australia) Ashleigh Barty	(Chinese Taipei) Hsieh Su-wei (Czech Republic) Barbora Strýcová	6–3, 6–7^{(7–9)}, [8–10]

== ITF Circuit finals ==
=== Singles: 11 (7 titles, 4 runner-ups) ===
Legend $25,000 tournaments $10,000 tournaments	Finals by surface Hard (2–1) Clay (5–3)

Result	W–L	Date	Tournament	Tier	Surface	Opponent	Score
Loss	0–1	Jun 2009	ITF Apeldoorn, Netherlands	10,000	Clay	(France) Natalie Piquion	3–6, 2–6
Win	1–1	Sep 2009	ITF Almere, Netherlands	10,000	Clay	(Netherlands) Angelique van der Meet	6–2, 6–4
Win	2–1	Oct 2009	ITF Antalya, Turkey	10,000	Clay	(Russia) Nanuli Pipiya	6–2, 6–2
Loss	2–2	Feb 2010	ITF Portimão, Portugal	10,000	Hard	(Italy) Claudia Giovine	3–6, 6–2, 7–6^{(7–1)}
Loss	2–3	Jun 2010	ITF Apeldoorn, Netherlands	10,000	Clay	(Netherlands) Angelique van der Meet	5–7, 3–6
Win	3–3	Jun 2010	ITF Rotterdam, Netherlands	10,000	Clay	(Netherlands) Daniëlle Harmsen	6–4, 6–2
Loss	3–4	Aug 2010	ITF Koksijde, Belgium	25,000	Clay	(Poland) Katarzyna Piter	4–6, 4–6
Win	4–4	Aug 2011	ITF Koksijde, Belgium	25,000	Clay	(Bulgaria) Elitsa Kostova	6–2, 6–1
Win	5–4	Mar 2012	ITF Irapuato, Mexico	25,000	Hard	(Kazakhstan) Yaroslava Shvedova	6–4, 2–6, 6–1
Win	6–4	Mar 2012	GB Pro-Series Bath, UK	25,000	Hard (i)	(Germany) Annika Beck	6–4, 3–6, 6–3
Win	7–4	Aug 2015	ITF Koksijde, Belgium (2)	25,000	Clay	(France) Myrtille Georges	3–6, 6–2, 6–3

=== Doubles: 13 (11 titles, 2 runner-ups) ===
Legend $100,000 tournaments $75,000 tournaments $50,000 tournaments $25,000 tournaments $10,000 tournaments	Finals by surface Hard (2–2) Clay (8–0) Carpet (1–0)

Result	W–L	Date	Tournament	Tier	Surface	Partner	Opponents	Score
Win	1–0	Aug 2009	ITF Bree, Belgium	10,000	Clay	(Netherlands) Quirine Lemoine	(Belgium) An-Sophie Mestach (Netherlands) Demi Schuurs	6–1, 6–0
Win	2–0	Aug 2009	ITF Rebecq, Belgium	10,000	Clay	(Netherlands) Nicole Thyssen	(Romania) Patricia Chirea (Italy) Valentina Sulpizio	6–2, 7–5
Win	3–0	Sep 2009	ITF Almere, Netherlands	10,000	Clay	(Netherlands) Nicole Thyssen	(Netherlands) Daniëlle Harmsen (Netherlands) Kim Kilsdonk	4–6, 6–2, [10–4]
Win	4–0	Oct 2009	ITF Antalya, Turkey	10,000	Clay	(Netherlands) Marcella Koek	(Poland) Barbara Sobaszkiewicz (Poland) Sylwia Zagórska	6–4, 0–6, [10–4]
Win	5–0	Nov 2009	ITF Jersey, United Kingdom	10,000	Hard (i)	(Netherlands) Daniëlle Harmsen	(Hungary) Tímea Babos (Denmark) Malou Ejdesgaard	7–5, 7–5
Win	6–0	Mar 2010	ITF Antalya, Turkey	10,000	Clay	(Netherlands) Daniëlle Harmsen	(Oman) Fatma Al-Nabhani (Chile) Andrea Koch Benvenuto	6–2, 6–4
Win	7–0	Oct 2010	ITF Helsinki, Finland	25,000	Hard (i)	(Netherlands) Richèl Hogenkamp	(Ukraine) Yuliya Beygelzimer (France) Kristina Mladenovic	6–3, 7–5
Loss	7–1	Jan 2011	Open Andrézieux, France	25,000	Hard (i)	(Netherlands) Richèl Hogenkamp	(Croatia) Darija Jurak (Russia) Valeria Savinykh	3–6, 6–7^{(0–7)}
Win	8–1	Aug 2011	ITF Monteroni, Italy	25,000	Clay	(Austria) Nicole Rottmann	(Italy) Gioia Barbieri (Italy) Anastasia Grymalska	6–0, 6–3
Loss	8–2	Oct 2011	ITF Madrid, Spain	25,000	Hard	(Belgium) Elyne Boeykens	(Spain) Rocio de la Torre-Sanchez (Spain) Georgina García Pérez	7–5, 4–6, 2–6
Win	9–2	Nov 2011	Ismaning Open, Germany	50,000	Carpet (i)	(United Kingdom) Anne Keothavong	(Germany) Kristina Barrois (Austria) Yvonne Meusburger	6–3, 6–3
Win	10–2	May 2014	Open de Cagnes-sur-Mer, France	100,000	Clay	(Sweden) Johanna Larsson	(Argentina) Tatiana Búa (Chile) Daniela Seguel	7–6^{(7–4)}, 6–4
Win	11–2	Jul 2015	ITF Warsaw Open, Poland	75,000	Clay	(Netherlands) Richèl Hogenkamp	(Sweden) Cornelia Lister (Latvia) Jeļena Ostapenko	7–6^{(7–2)}, 6–4

== Career Grand Slam statistics ==
=== Seedings ===
The tournaments won by Bertens are in boldface, and advanced into finals by Bertens are in italics.

Year	Australian Open	French Open	Wimbledon	US Open
2011	did not play	did not qualify	did not play	did not qualify
2012	did not qualify	not seeded	not seeded	not seeded
2013	not seeded	not seeded	not seeded	not seeded
2014	not seeded	not seeded	did not qualify	not seeded
2015	not seeded	not seeded	not seeded	not seeded
2016	not seeded	not seeded	26th	20th
2017	19th	18th	23rd	24th
2018	30th	18th	20th	13th
2019	9th	4th	4th	7th
2020	9th	5th	not held	did not play
2021	did not play	16th	17th	did not play

== Record against other players ==
=== No. 1 wins ===
No.	Player	Event	Surface	Round	Score	Result
1.	(Romania) Simona Halep	2018 Cincinnati Open, United States	Hard	F	2–6, 7–6^{(8–6)}, 6–2	**W**
2.	(Australia) Ashleigh Barty	2019 WTA Finals, Shenzhen	Hard (i)	RR	3–6, 6–3, 6–4	RR

=== Top 10 wins ===
Season	2016	2017	2018	2019	2020	Total
Wins	3	0	12	8	0	**23**

#	Player	vsRank	Event	Surface	Round	Score	Rank
**2016**
1.	(Italy) Roberta Vinci	7	Nuremberg Cup, Germany	Clay	2R	6–4, 7–6^{(7–4)}	89
2.	(Germany) Angelique Kerber	3	French Open, France	Clay	1R	6–2, 3–6, 6–3	58
3.	(Switzerland) Timea Bacsinszky	9	French Open, France	Clay	QF	7–5, 6–2	58
**2018**
4.	(Denmark) Caroline Wozniacki	2	Madrid Open, Spain	Clay	3R	6–2, 6–2	20
5.	(France) Caroline Garcia	7	Madrid Open, Spain	Clay	SF	6–2, 6–2	20
6.	(United States) Venus Williams	9	Wimbledon, United Kingdom	Grass	3R	6–2, 6–7^{(5–7)}, 8–6	20
7.	(Czech Republic) Karolína Plíšková	8	Wimbledon, United Kingdom	Grass	4R	6–3, 7–6^{(7–1)}	20
8.	(Czech Republic) Karolína Plíšková	9	Canadian Open, Canada	Hard	2R	6–2, 6–2	18
9.	(Czech Republic) Petra Kvitová	8	Canadian Open, Canada	Hard	3R	6–3, 6–2	18
10.	(Denmark) Caroline Wozniacki	2	Cincinnati Open, United States	Hard	2R	6–4, ret.	17
11.	(Ukraine) Elina Svitolina	7	Cincinnati Open, United States	Hard	QF	6–4, 6–3	17
12.	(Czech Republic) Petra Kvitová	6	Cincinnati Open, United States	Hard	SF	3–6, 6–4, 6–2	17
13.	(Romania) Simona Halep	1	Cincinnati Open, United States	Hard	F	2–6, 7–6^{(8–6)}, 6–2	17
14.	(Germany) Angelique Kerber	2	WTA Finals, Singapore	Hard (i)	RR	1–6, 6–3, 6–4	9
15.	(Japan) Naomi Osaka	4	WTA Finals, Singapore	Hard (i)	RR	6–3, ret.	9
**2019**
16.	(Belarus) Aryna Sabalenka	10	St. Petersburg Trophy, Russia	Hard (i)	SF	7–6^{(7–5)}, 6–2	8
17.	(Germany) Angelique Kerber	5	Stuttgart Open, Germany	Clay (i)	QF	6–3, 6–4	7
18.	(Czech Republic) Petra Kvitová	2	Madrid Open, Spain	Clay	QF	6–2, 6–3	7
19.	(United States) Sloane Stephens	8	Madrid Open, Spain	Clay	SF	6–2, 7–5	7
20.	(Romania) Simona Halep	3	Madrid Open, Spain	Clay	F	6–4, 6–4	7
21.	(Belarus) Aryna Sabalenka	10	Eastbourne International, UK	Grass	QF	6–4, 3–6, 6–4	4
22.	(Ukraine) Elina Svitolina	3	China Open, China	Hard	QF	7–6^{(8–6)}, 6–2	8
23.	(Australia) Ashleigh Barty	1	WTA Finals, China	Hard (i)	RR	3–6, 6–3, 6–4	10

== Longest winning streaks ==
=== 10–match (12 with qualifiers) singles winning streak (2016) ===
#	Tournament	Category	Start date	Surface	Rd	Opponent	Rank	Score
–	Italian Open, Italy	Premier 5	9 May 2016	Clay	1R	(Hungary) Tímea Babos	48	1–6, 4–6
–	Nuremberg Cup, Germany	International	16 May 2016	Clay	Q1	(Switzerland) Conny Perrin	229	6–1, 6–0
–	Nuremberg Cup, Germany	International	16 May 2016	Clay	Q2	(Romania) Cristina Dinu	217	6–1, 6–3
1	Nuremberg Cup, Germany	International	16 May 2016	Clay	1R	(Germany) Tatjana Maria (Q)	112	6–1, 7–6^{(7–0)}
2	Nuremberg Cup, Germany	International	16 May 2016	Clay	2R	(Italy) Roberta Vinci (1)	7	6–4, 7–6^{(7–4)}
3	Nuremberg Cup, Germany	International	16 May 2016	Clay	QF	(United States) Irina Falconi	64	6–1, 0–1 ret.
4	Nuremberg Cup, Germany	International	16 May 2016	Clay	SF	(Germany) Julia Görges	60	3–6, 6–4, 7–6^{(7–4)}
5	Nuremberg Cup, Germany	International	16 May 2016	Clay	F	(Colombia) Mariana Duque Mariño	98	6–2, 6–2
6	French Open, France	Grand Slam	23 May 2016	Clay	1R	(Germany) Angelique Kerber (3)	3	6–2, 3–6, 6–3
7	French Open, France	Grand Slam	23 May 2016	Clay	2R	(Italy) Camila Giorgi	44	6–4, 6–1
8	French Open, France	Grand Slam	23 May 2016	Clay	3R	(Russia) Daria Kasatkina (29)	32	6–2, 3–6, 10–8
9	French Open, France	Grand Slam	23 May 2016	Clay	4R	(United States) Madison Keys (15)	17	7–6^{(7–4)}, 6–3
10	French Open, France	Grand Slam	23 May 2016	Clay	QF	(Switzerland) Timea Bacsinszky (8)	9	7–5, 6–2
–	French Open, France	Grand Slam	23 May 2016	Clay	SF	(United States) Serena Williams (1)	1	6–7^{(7–9)}, 4–6
