= Johanna Larsson career statistics =

Career finals
| Discipline | Type | Won | Lost | Total | WR |
|---|---|---|---|---|---|
| Singles | Grand Slam | – | – | – | – |
| Singles | Summer Olympics | – | – | – | – |
| Singles | WTA Finals (Note: Formerly known as: Virginia Slims Championships (until 1995); WTA Tour Championships (until 2014)) | – | – | – | – |
| Singles | WTA Elite (Note: Elite tier: WTA Tournament of Champions (2009–14); WTA Elite Trophy (2015–present)) | – | – | – | – |
| Singles | WTA 1000 (Note: Formerly known as: Category 4 & 5 & 6 (until 1990); Tier I (until 2009); WTA Premier Mandatory and 5 (until 2021)) | – | – | – | – |
| Singles | WTA 500 (Note: Formerly known as: Category 3 (until 1990); Tier II (until 2009); WTA Premier (until 2021)) | – | – | – | – |
| Singles | WTA 250 (Note: Formerly known as: Category 1 & 2 (until 1990); Tier III & IV & V (until 2009); WTA International (until 2021)) | 2 | 3 | 5 | 0.40 |
| Singles | Total | 2 | 3 | 5 | 0.40 |
| Doubles | Grand Slam | – | – | – | – |
| Doubles | Summer Olympics | – | – | – | – |
| Doubles | WTA Finals | 0 | 1 | 1 | 0.00 |
| Doubles | WTA Elite | – | – | – | – |
| Doubles | WTA 1000 | – | – | – | – |
| Doubles | WTA 500 | – | – | – | – |
| Doubles | WTA 250 | 14 | 8 | 22 | 0.64 |
| Doubles | Total | 14 | 9 | 23 | 0.60 |
| Total | | 16 | 12 | 28 | 0.57 |

From her professional debut in 2006 until her retirement in 2020, Swedish professional tennis player Johanna Larsson won two singles and 14 doubles titles on the WTA Tour, including both titles at her home tournament in Båstad in 2015.

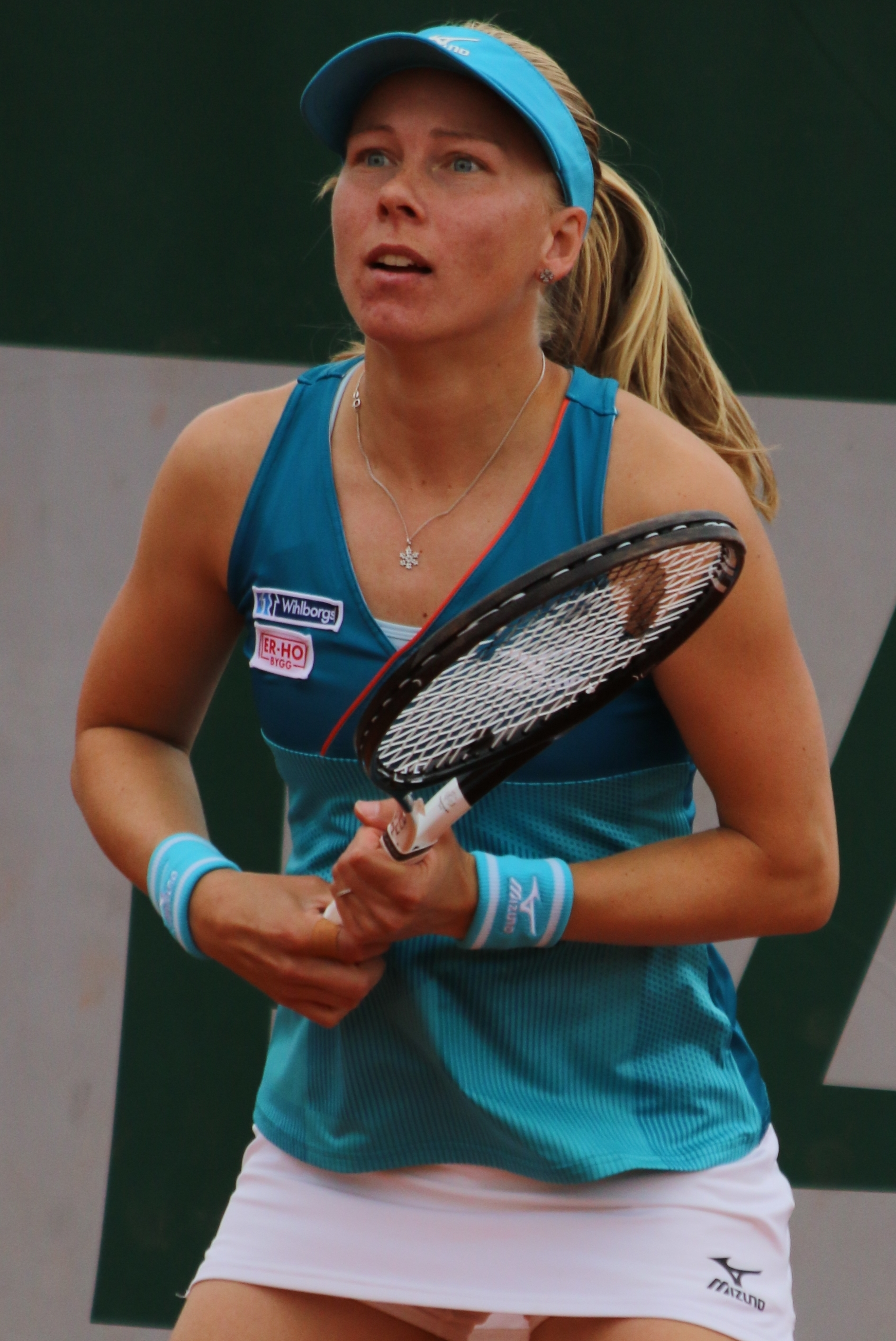
Swedish player Johanna Larsson at the 2019 French Open

== Performance timelines ==
Key
| W | F | SF | QF | #R | RR | Q# | P# | DNQ | A | Z# | PO | G | S | B | NMS | NTI | P | NH |

(W) winner; (F) finalist; (SF) semifinalist; (QF) quarterfinalist; (#R) rounds 4, 3, 2, 1; (RR) round-robin stage; (Q#) qualification round; (P#) preliminary round; (DNQ) did not qualify; (A) absent; (Z#) Davis/Fed Cup Zonal Group (with number indication) or (PO) play-off; (G) gold, (S) silver or (B) bronze Olympic/Paralympic medal; (NMS) not a Masters tournament; (NTI) not a Tier I tournament; (P) postponed; (NH) not held; (SR) strike rate (events won / competed); (W–L) win–loss record.
To avoid confusion and double counting, these charts are updated at the conclusion of a tournament or when the player's participation has ended.

Only main-draw results in WTA Tour, Grand Slam tournaments, Billie Jean King Cup (Fed Cup), Hopman Cup and Olympic Games are included in win–loss records.

=== Singles ===
| Tournament | 2005 | 2006 | 2007 | 2008 | 2009 | 2010 | 2011 | 2012 | 2013 | 2014 | 2015 | 2016 | 2017 | 2018 | 2019 | 2020 | SR | W–L | Win % |
|---|---|---|---|---|---|---|---|---|---|---|---|---|---|---|---|---|---|---|---|
Grand Slam tournaments
| Australian Open | A | A | A | A | Q1 | A | 1R | 1R | 1R | 1R | 2R | 2R | A | 1R | 2R | 1R | 0 / 9 | 3–9 | 25% |
| French Open | A | A | A | Q2 | A | 2R | 2R | 1R | 2R | 3R | 1R | 2R | 2R | 1R | 2R | A | 0 / 10 | 8–10 | 44% |
| Wimbledon | A | A | A | Q2 | A | Q1 | 1R | 1R | 1R | 1R | 1R | 1R | 1R | 1R | Q1 | NH | 0 / 8 | 0–8 | 0% |
| US Open | A | A | A | Q3 | A | 1R | 1R | 1R | 1R | 3R | 1R | 3R | 1R | 2R | 1R | A | 0 / 10 | 5–10 | 33% |
| Win–loss | 0–0 | 0–0 | 0–0 | 0–0 | 0–0 | 1–2 | 1–4 | 0–4 | 1–4 | 4–4 | 1–4 | 4–4 | 1–3 | 1–4 | 2–3 | 0–1 | 0 / 37 | 16–37 | 30% |
National representation
| Summer Olympics | NH | | | A | NH | | | A | NH | | | 1R | NH | | | | 0 / 1 | 0–1 | 0% |
WTA Premier tournaments
| Dubai / Qatar Open (Note: The first Premier 5 event of the year has switched back and forth between the Dubai Tennis Championships and the Qatar Ladies Open since 2009. Dubai was classified as a Premier 5 event from 2009 to 2011 before being succeeded by Doha for the 2012–2014 period. In 2015, Dubai regained its Premier 5 status while Doha was demoted to Premier status. The Premier 5 tournaments were reclassified as WTA 1000 tournaments in 2021.) | NMS | | | A | A | A | A | A | A | A | A | A | 1R | A | A | A | 0 / 1 | 0–1 | 0% |
| Indian Wells Open | A | A | A | A | A | A | 1R | 2R | 3R | Q2 | 1R | 3R | 2R | Q2 | 1R | NH | 0 / 7 | 6–7 | 46% |
| Miami Open | A | A | A | A | A | A | 3R | 1R | 1R | Q2 | 3R | 1R | 2R | 2R | 1R | NH | 0 / 8 | 6–8 | 43% |
| Madrid Open | NH | | | | A | A | A | 1R | Q2 | A | A | A | 2R | Q2 | A | NH | 0 / 2 | 1–2 | 33% |
| Italian Open | A | A | A | A | A | A | A | Q1 | A | A | A | 1R | A | A | A | A | 0 / 1 | 0–1 | 0% |
| Canadian Open | A | A | A | A | A | A | A | Q3 | Q2 | A | A | A | Q1 | A | A | NH | 0 / 0 | 0–0 | – |
| Cincinnati Open | NMS | | | | A | A | Q2 | 3R | Q2 | A | Q1 | 2R | Q1 | Q1 | A | A | 0 / 2 | 3–2 | 60% |
| Pan Pacific / Wuhan Open (Note: In 2014, the Pan Pacific Open was downgraded to a Premier event and replaced by the Wuhan Open. The Premier 5 tournaments were reclassified as WTA 1000 tournaments in 2021.) | A | A | A | A | A | A | A | 2R | A | A | A | A | A | A | A | NH | 0 / 1 | 1–1 | 50% |
| China Open | NMS | | | | A | A | A | Q2 | Q1 | A | A | A | A | A | A | NH | 0 / 0 | 0–0 | – |
| Win–loss | 0–0 | 0–0 | 0–0 | 0–0 | 0–0 | 0–0 | 2–2 | 4–5 | 2–2 | 0–0 | 2–2 | 3–4 | 3–4 | 1–1 | 0–2 | 0–0 | 0 / 22 | 17–22 | 44% |
Career statistics
| | 2005 | 2006 | 2007 | 2008 | 2009 | 2010 | 2011 | 2012 | 2013 | 2014 | 2015 | 2016 | 2017 | 2018 | 2019 | 2020 | SR | W–L | Win % |
| Tournaments | 0 (Note: During the season, she did not play in the main draw of any WTA Tour-level tournaments. However, she played at the Billie Jean King Cup that is not counted as a played tournament but matches count.) | 1 | 0 | 1 | 2 | 9 | 18 | 19 | 16 | 15 | 20 | 25 | 20 | 19 | 13 | 1 | Career total: 179 | | |
| Titles | 0 | 0 | 0 | 0 | 0 | 0 | 0 | 0 | 0 | 0 | 1 | 0 | 0 | 1 | 0 | 0 | Career total: 2 | | |
| Finals | 0 | 0 | 0 | 0 | 0 | 1 | 1 | 0 | 1 | 0 | 1 | 0 | 0 | 1 | 0 | 0 | Career total: 5 | | |
| Overall win–loss | 3–0 | 3–4 | 2–1 | 4–2 | 3–3 | 14–9 | 20–21 | 17–21 | 14–19 | 10–16 | 25–21 | 29–25 | 17–21 | 17–18 | 5–15 | 1–3 | 2 / 179 | 184–199 | 48% |
| Year-end ranking (Note: 2004: WTA ranking–1183, tournaments–0, win–loss 0–0) | 491 | 382 | 314 | 169 | 170 | 68 | 59 | 73 | 83 | 70 | 55 | 51 | 80 | 76 | 217 | n/a | $4,033,735 | | |

=== Doubles ===
| Tournament | 2005 | 2006 | 2007 | 2008 | 2009 | 2010 | 2011 | 2012 | 2013 | 2014 | 2015 | 2016 | 2017 | 2018 | 2019 | SR | W–L | Win% |
|---|---|---|---|---|---|---|---|---|---|---|---|---|---|---|---|---|---|---|
Grand Slam tournaments
| Australian Open | A | A | A | A | A | A | 2R | 1R | 1R | A | QF | 1R | 2R | 1R | 3R | 0 / 8 | 7–8 | 47% |
| French Open | A | A | A | A | A | A | 2R | 1R | 1R | A | 1R | QF | 3R | 3R | SF | 0 / 8 | 13–8 | 62% |
| Wimbledon | A | A | A | A | A | Q1 | 1R | 1R | 1R | Q2 | 1R | 2R | 1R | 3R | 2R | 0 / 8 | 4–8 | 33% |
| US Open | A | A | A | A | A | 1R | 1R | 1R | 2R | A | 3R | 2R | 3R | 2R | 1R | 0 / 9 | 7–9 | 44% |
| Win–loss | 0–0 | 0–0 | 0–0 | 0–0 | 0–0 | 0–1 | 2–4 | 0–4 | 1–4 | 0–0 | 5–4 | 5–4 | 5–4 | 5–4 | 7–4 | 0 / 33 | 31–33 | 48% |
Year-end championships
| WTA Finals | DNQ | | | | | | | | | | | | F | DNQ | | 0 / 1 | 2–1 | 67% |
WTA Premier tournaments
| Dubai / Qatar Open | NMS | | | A | A | A | A | A | A | A | A | A | 2R | A | A | 0 / 1 | 1–1 | 50% |
| Indian Wells Open | A | A | A | A | A | A | A | A | A | A | A | 2R | 2R | 1R | 2R | 0 / 4 | 3–4 | 43% |
| Miami Open | A | A | A | A | A | A | A | A | A | A | A | 1R | A | 1R | 1R | 0 / 3 | 0–3 | 0% |
| Madrid Open | NH | | | | A | A | A | A | 1R | A | A | A | QF | 1R | A | 0 / 3 | 2–3 | 40% |
| Italian Open | A | A | A | A | A | A | A | A | A | A | A | 2R | A | A | A | 0 / 1 | 1–1 | 50% |
| Cincinnati Open | NMS | | | | A | 2R | A | A | A | A | 1R | 2R (Note: Withdrawal during the tournament not counted as a loss.) | A | A | A | 0 / 2 | 2–2 | 50% |
| Win–loss | 0–0 | 0–0 | 0–0 | 0–0 | 0–0 | 1–1 | 0–0 | 0–0 | 0–1 | 0–0 | 0–1 | 3–3 | 4–3 | 0–3 | 1–2 | 0 / 14 | 9–14 | 39% |

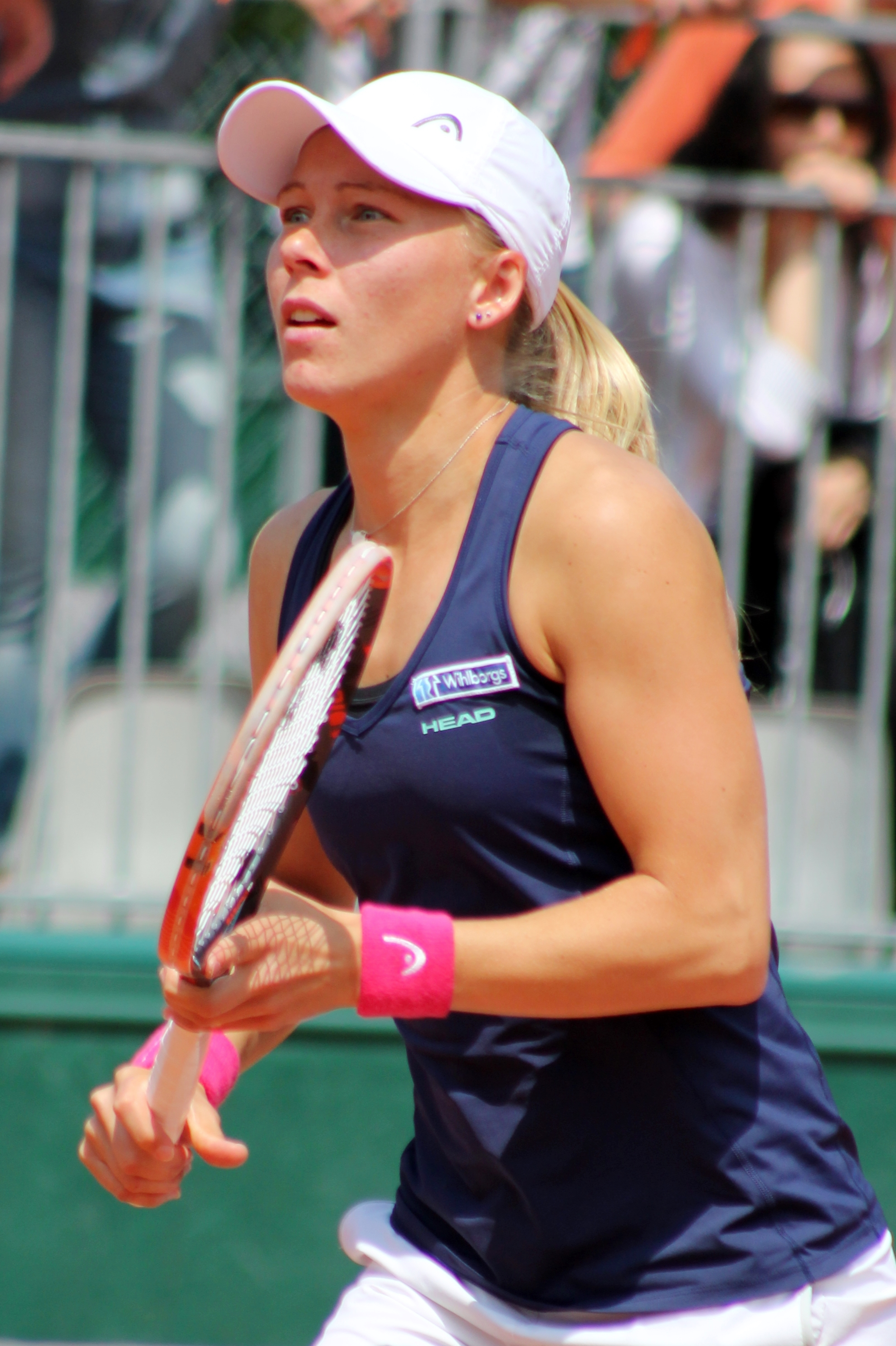
Larsson at the 2016 French Open.

== Significant finals ==
=== WTA Finals ===
==== Doubles: 1 (runner-up) ====
| Result | Year | Tournament | Surface | Partner | Opponent | Score |
|---|---|---|---|---|---|---|
| Loss | 2017 | WTA Finals, Singapore | Hard (i) | (Netherlands) Kiki Bertens | (Hungary) Tímea Babos (Czech Republic) Andrea Hlaváčková | 6–4, 4–6, [5–10] |

== WTA Tour finals ==
=== Singles: 5 (2 titles, 3 runner-ups) ===
| Legend WTA 250 (International) (2–3) | Finals by surface Hard (0–1) Clay (2–2) |

| Result | W–L | Date | Tournament | Tier | Surface | Opponent | Score |
|---|---|---|---|---|---|---|---|
| Loss | 0–1 | Jul 2010 | Slovenia Open | International | Hard | (Russia) Anna Chakvetadze | 1–6, 2–6 |
| Loss | 0–2 | Jul 2011 | Swedish Open, Sweden | International | Clay | (Slovenia) Polona Hercog | 4–6, 5–7 |
| Loss | 0–3 | Jul 2013 | Swedish Open, Sweden | International | Clay | (United States) Serena Williams | 4–6, 1–6 |
| Win | 1–3 | Jul 2015 | Swedish Open, Sweden | International | Clay | (Germany) Mona Barthel | 6–3, 7–6^{(7–2)} |
| Win | 2–3 | May 2018 | Nuremberg Cup, Germany | International | Clay | (United States) Alison Riske | 7–6^{(7–4)}, 6–4 |

=== Doubles: 23 (14 titles, 9 runner-ups) ===
| Legend Finals (0–1) WTA 250 (International) (14–8) | Finals by surface Hard (10–6) Grass (1–0) Clay (3–3) |

| Result | W–L | Date | Tournament | Tier | Surface | Partner | Opponents | Score |
|---|---|---|---|---|---|---|---|---|
| Win | 1–0 | Sep 2010 | Tournoi de Québec, Canada | International | Hard | (Sweden) Sofia Arvidsson | (United States) Bethanie Mattek-Sands (Czech Republic) Barbora Strýcová | 6–1, 2–6, [10–6] |
| Win | 2–0 | Jun 2011 | Danish Open, Denmark | International | Hard | (Germany) Jasmin Wöhr | (France) Kristina Mladenovic (Poland) Katarzyna Piter | 6–3, 6–3 |
| Loss | 2–1 | Feb 2013 | National Indoor Championships, U.S. | International | Hard (i) | (Sweden) Sofia Arvidsson | (France) Kristina Mladenovic (Kazakhstan) Galina Voskoboeva | 6–7^{(5–7)}, 3–6 |
| Loss | 2–2 | Feb 2014 | Rio Open, Brazil | International | Clay | (South Africa) Chanelle Scheepers | (Romania) Irina-Camelia Begu (Argentina) María Irigoyen | 2–6, 0–6 |
| Win | 3–2 | Jan 2015 | Hobart International, Australia | International | Hard | (Netherlands) Kiki Bertens | (Russia) Vitalia Diatchenko (Romania) Monica Niculescu | 7–5, 6–3 |
| Win | 4–2 | Jul 2015 | Swedish Open, Sweden | International | Clay | (Netherlands) Kiki Bertens | (Germany) Tatjana Maria (Ukraine) Olga Savchuk | 7–5, 6–4 |
| Loss | 4–3 | Sep 2015 | Korea Open, South Korea | International | Hard | (Netherlands) Kiki Bertens | (Spain) Lara Arruabarrena (Slovenia) Andreja Klepač | 6–2, 3–6, [6–10] |
| Loss | 4–4 | Feb 2016 | Mexican Open, Mexico | International | Hard | (Netherlands) Kiki Bertens | (Spain) Anabel Medina Garrigues (Spain) Arantxa Parra Santonja | 0–6, 4–6 |
| Win | 5–4 | May 2016 | Nuremberg Cup, Germany | International | Clay | (Netherlands) Kiki Bertens | (Japan) Shuko Aoyama (Czech Republic) Renata Voráčová | 6–3, 6–4 |
| Win | 6–4 | Sep 2016 | Korea Open, South Korea | International | Hard | (Belgium) Kirsten Flipkens | (Japan) Akiko Omae (Thailand) Peangtarn Plipuech | 6–2, 6–3 |
| Win | 7–4 | Oct 2016 | Linz Open, Austria | International | Hard | (Netherlands) Kiki Bertens | (Germany) Anna-Lena Grönefeld (Czech Republic) Květa Peschke | 4–6, 6–2, [10–7] |
| Win | 8–4 | Oct 2016 | Luxembourg Open | International | Hard (i) | (Netherlands) Kiki Bertens | (Romania) Monica Niculescu (Romania) Patricia Maria Țig | 4–6, 7–5, [11–9] |
| Win | 9–4 | Jan 2017 | Auckland Open, New Zealand | International | Hard | (Netherlands) Kiki Bertens | (Netherlands) Demi Schuurs (Czech Republic) Renata Voráčová | 6–2, 6–2 |
| Loss | 9–5 | May 2017 | Nuremberg Cup, Germany | International | Clay | (Belgium) Kirsten Flipkens | (United States) Nicole Melichar (United Kingdom) Anna Smith | 6–3, 3–6, [9–11] |
| Win | 10–5 | Jul 2017 | Swiss Open, Switzerland | International | Clay | (Netherlands) Kiki Bertens | (Switzerland) Viktorija Golubic (Serbia) Nina Stojanović | 7–6^{(7–4)}, 4–6, [10–7] |
| Win | 11–5 | Sep 2017 | Korea Open, South Korea (2) | International | Hard | (Netherlands) Kiki Bertens | (Thailand) Luksika Kumkhum (Thailand) Peangtarn Plipuech | 6–4, 6–1 |
| Win | 12–5 | Oct 2017 | Linz Open, Austria (2) | International | Hard | (Netherlands) Kiki Bertens | (Russia) Natela Dzalamidze (Switzerland) Xenia Knoll | 3–6, 6–3, [10–4] |
| Loss | 12–6 | Oct 2017 | WTA Finals, Singapore | Finals | Hard (i) | (Netherlands) Kiki Bertens | (Hungary) Tímea Babos (Czech Republic) Andrea Hlaváčková | 6–4, 4–6, [5–10] |
| Loss | 12–7 | Feb 2018 | Budapest Grand Prix, Hungary | International | Hard (i) | (Belgium) Kirsten Flipkens | (Spain) Georgina García Pérez (Hungary) Fanny Stollár | 6–4, 4–6, [3–10] |
| Loss | 12–8 | May 2018 | Nuremberg Cup, Germany | International | Clay | (Belgium) Kirsten Flipkens | (Netherlands) Demi Schuurs (Slovenia) Katarina Srebotnik | 6–3, 3–6, [7–10] |
| Win | 13–8 | Oct 2018 | Linz Open, Austria (3) | International | Hard (i) | (Belgium) Kirsten Flipkens | (United States) Raquel Atawo (Germany) Anna-Lena Grönefeld | 4–6, 6–4, [10–5] |
| Loss | 13–9 | Jan 2019 | Hobart International, Australia | International | Hard | (Belgium) Kirsten Flipkens | (Chinese Taipei) Chan Hao-ching (Chinese Taipei) Latisha Chan | 3–6, 6–3, [6–10] |
| Win | 14–9 | Jun 2019 | Mallorca Open, Spain | International | Grass | (Belgium) Kirsten Flipkens | (Spain) María José Martínez Sánchez (Spain) Sara Sorribes Tormo | 6–2, 6–4 |

== ITF Circuit finals ==
=== Singles: 25 (13 titles, 12 runner-ups) ===
| Legend $100,000 tournaments $75,000 tournaments $50,000 tournaments $25,000 tournaments $10,000 tournaments | Finals by surface Hard (8–3) Clay (5–9) |

| Result | W–L | Date | Tournament | Tier | Surface | Opponent | Score |
|---|---|---|---|---|---|---|---|
| Win | 1–0 | May 2005 | ITF Falkenberg, Sweden | 10,000 | Clay | (Sweden) Sofia Arvidsson | 6–1, 6–3 |
| Loss | 1–1 | Jun 2005 | ITF Oslo, Norway | 10,000 | Clay | (Sweden) Mari Andersson | 4–6, 4–6 |
| Loss | 1–2 | Nov 2005 | ITF Stockholm, Sweden | 10,000 | Clay | (Germany) Carmen Klaschka | 3–6, 3–6 |
| Win | 2–2 | May 2006 | ITF Bol, Croatia | 10,000 | Clay | (Croatia) Tereza Mrdeža | 6–1, 6–3 |
| Win | 3–2 | Apr 2007 | ITF Falkenberg, Sweden | 10,000 | Clay | (Germany) Anne Schäfer | 6–2, 7–6 |
| Win | 4–2 | Oct 2007 | ITF Stockholm, Sweden | 10,000 | Hard (i) | (Sweden) Nadja Roma | 6–2, 6–1 |
| Loss | 4–3 | Jan 2008 | ITF Sunderland, United Kingdom | 10,000 | Hard (i) | (Russia) Elena Kulikova | 2–6, 6–7 |
| Win | 5–3 | Feb 2008 | ITF Sutton, United Kingdom | 25,000 | Hard (i) | (Czech Republic) Andrea Hlaváčková | 7–5, 6–0 |
| Win | 6–3 | Feb 2008 | ITF Stockholm, Sweden | 25,000 | Hard (i) | (Czech Republic) Barbora Strýcová | 0–6, 6–1, 7–6 |
| Loss | 6–4 | Aug 2009 | Ladies Open Hechingen, Germany | 25,000 | Clay | (Austria) Yvonne Meusburger | 7–5, 5–7, 2–6 |
| Loss | 6–5 | Sep 2009 | ITF Alphen aan den Rijn, Netherlands | 25,000 | Clay | (France) Iryna Brémond | 3–6 3–6 |
| Loss | 6–6 | Oct 2009 | ITF Istanbul, Turkey | 25,000 | Hard (i) | (Estonia) Maret Ani | 5–7, 7–6, 2–6 |
| Win | 7–6 | Oct 2009 | GB Pro-Series Barnstaple, UK | 50,000 | Hard (i) | (France) Pauline Parmentier | 6–2, 6–2 |
| Win | 8–6 | Oct 2009 | GB Pro-Series Glasgow, UK | 25,000 | Hard (i) | (United Kingdom) Melanie South | 6–1, 1–6, 6–3 |
| Loss | 8–7 | Jan 2010 | ITF Plantation, United States | 25,000 | Clay | (Croatia) Ajla Tomljanović | 3–6, 3–6 |
| Win | 9–7 | Feb 2010 | Biberach Open, Germany | 50,000 | Hard (i) | (Switzerland) Romina Oprandi | 4–6, 6–2, 6–2 |
| Win | 10–7 | Mar 2010 | ITF Clearwater, United States | 25,000 | Hard | (China) Zhang Shuai | 7–6, 6–0 |
| Win | 11–7 | Mar 2010 | ITF Jersey, United Kingdom | 25,000 | Hard (i) | (United Kingdom) Anna Smith | 6–2, 6–3 |
| Loss | 11–8 | Jun 2010 | Open de Marseille, France | 100,000 | Clay | (Czech Republic) Klára Zakopalová | 3–6, 3–6 |
| Loss | 11–9 | Oct 2010 | GB Pro-Series Barnstaple, UK | 75,000 | Hard (i) | (United States) Alison Riske | 2–6, 0–6 |
| Win | 12–9 | Jul 2012 | Internazionale di Biella, Italy | 100,000 | Clay | (Georgia (country)) Anna Tatishvili | 6–3, 6–4 |
| Loss | 12–10 | Jun 2014 | Open de Marseille, France | 100,000 | Clay | (Romania) Alexandra Dulgheru | 3–6, 5–7 |
| Loss | 12–11 | Aug 2014 | Open Bogotá, Colombia | 100,000 | Clay | (Spain) Lara Arruabarrena | 1–6, 3–6 |
| Loss | 12–12 | Jul 2015 | Reinert Open, Germany | 50,000 | Clay | (Germany) Carina Witthöft | 3–6, 3–6 |
| Win | 13–12 | Jul 2017 | Contrexéville Open, France | 100,000 | Clay | (Germany) Tatjana Maria | 6–1, 6–4 |

=== Doubles: 26 (17 titles, 9 runner-ups) ===
| Legend $100,000 tournaments $75,000 tournaments $50,000 tournaments $25,000 tournaments $10,000 tournaments | Finals by surface Hard (9–4) Clay (7–5) Grass (1–0) |

| Result | W–L | Date | Tournament | Tier | Surface | Partner | Opponents | Score |
|---|---|---|---|---|---|---|---|---|
| Win | 1–0 | May 2005 | ITF Falkenberg, Sweden | 10,000 | Clay | (Sweden) Mari Andersson | (Poland) Natalia Kołat (Poland) Monika Schneider | 6–1, 6–1 |
| Win | 2–0 | Jun 2005 | ITF Oslo, Norway | 10,000 | Clay | (Sweden) Nadja Roma | (Sweden) Kristina Andlovic (Norway) Karoline Borgersen | 6–4, 6–4 |
| Loss | 2–1 | Nov 2005 | ITF Stockholm, Sweden | 10,000 | Hard (i) | (Sweden) Mari Andersson | (Austria) Eva-Maria Hoch (Germany) Martina Pavelec | 4–6, 3–6 |
| Loss | 2–2 | Apr 2006 | ITF Makarska, Croatia | 10,000 | Clay | (Sweden) Nadja Roma | (Romania) Raluca Olaru (Romania) Antonia Xenia Tout | 4–6, 5–7 |
| Win | 3–2 | Oct 2007 | Open Nantes, France | 25,000 | Hard | (Sweden) Sofia Arvidsson | (United Kingdom) Melanie South (Belgium) Caroline Maes | 4–6, 7–5, [10–7] |
| Win | 4–2 | Oct 2007 | GB Pro-Series Glasgow, UK | 25,000 | Hard | (Sweden) Sofia Arvidsson | (Czech Republic) Veronika Chvojková (Germany) Kathrin Wörle | 6–2, 6–3 |
| Win | 5–2 | Nov 2007 | ITF Stockholm, Sweden | 10,000 | Hard | (Sweden) Nadja Roma | (Sweden) Diana Eriksson (Denmark) Hanne Skak Jensen | 6–7, 6–3, [10–6] |
| Win | 6–2 | Jan 2008 | ITF Sunderland, United Kingdom | 10,000 | Hard | (United Kingdom) Anna Smith | (Slovakia) Martina Babáková (Czech Republic) Iveta Gerlová | 6–1, 3–6, [10–3] |
| Loss | 6–3 | Feb 2008 | ITF Sutton, United Kingdom | 25,000 | Hard (i) | (United Kingdom) Anna Smith | (Czech Republic) Andrea Hlaváčková (Czech Republic) Lucie Hradecká | 3–6, 3–6 |
| Win | 7–3 | Feb 2008 | ITF Stockholm, Sweden | 25,000 | Hard | (United Kingdom) Anna Smith | (Serbia) Neda Kozić (Croatia) Ivana Lisjak | 6–0, 7–5 |
| Win | 8–3 | Sep 2008 | GB Pro-Series Shrewsbury, UK | 75,000 | Hard | (United Kingdom) Anna Smith | (United Kingdom) Sarah Borwell (United States) Courtney Nagle | 7–6, 6–4 |
| Win | 9–3 | Oct 2008 | ITF Helsinki, Finland | 25,000 | Hard | (Finland) Emma Laine | (Austria) Patricia Mayr (Canada) Marie-Ève Pelletier | 6–4, 6–2 |
| Loss | 9–4 | Apr 2009 | ITF Bari, Italy | 25,000 | Clay | (United Kingdom) Anna Smith | (Ukraine) Irina Buryachok (Czech Republic) Renata Voráčová | 7–5, 2–6, [5–10] |
| Win | 10–4 | Jun 2009 | ITF Kristinehamn, Sweden | 25,000 | Clay | (Denmark) Hanne-Skak Jensen | (Sweden) Sofia Arvidsson (Sweden) Sandra Roma | 7–6, 6–2 |
| Win | 11–4 | Aug 2009 | ITF Bad Saulgau, Germany | 25,000 | Clay | (Denmark) Hanne-Skak Jensen | (Japan) Yurika Sema (Croatia) Darija Jurak | 6–2, 6–3 |
| Loss | 11–5 | Aug 2009 | ITF Koksijde, Belgium | 25,000 | Clay | (United Kingdom) Anna Smith | (Australia) Shannon Golds (Australia) Nicole Kriz | 6–7^{(3–7)}, 2–6 |
| Loss | 11–6 | Aug 2009 | ITF Katowice, Poland | 25,000 | Clay | (Austria) Melanie Klaffner | (Poland) Karolina Kosińska (Romania) Ágnes Szatmári | 1–6, 6–2, [5–10] |
| Loss | 11–7 | Sep 2009 | GB Pro-Series Shrewsbury, UK | 75,000 | Hard (i) | (United Kingdom) Anna Smith | (Germany) Kristina Barrois (Austria) Yvonne Meusburger | 6–3, 4–6, [7–10] |
| Loss | 11–8 | Sep 2009 | ITF Helsinki, Finland | 25,000 | Hard (i) | (United Kingdom) Anna Smith | (Finland) Emma Laine (United Kingdom) Melanie South | 3–6, 3–6 |
| Win | 12–8 | Oct 2009 | GB Pro-Series Barnstaple, UK | 50,000 | Hard | (United Kingdom) Anna Smith | (Finland) Emma Laine (South Africa) Kelly Anderson | 7–5, 6–4 |
| Win | 13–8 | Mar 2010 | ITF Fort Walton Beach, U.S. | 25,000 | Hard | (South Africa) Chanelle Scheepers | (United States) Christina Fusano (United States) Courtney Nagle | 2–6, 7–6, [10–7] |
| Win | 14–8 | Jun 2010 | Open de Marseille, France | 100,000 | Clay | (Austria) Yvonne Meusburger | (France) Stéphanie Cohen-Aloro (France) Aurélie Védy | 6–4, 6–2 |
| Win | 15–8 | Jul 2011 | ITF Pétange, Luxembourg | 100,000 | Clay | (Germany) Jasmin Wöhr | (Germany) Anna-Lena Grönefeld (Germany) Kristina Barrois | 7–6, 6–4 |
| Loss | 15–9 | Sep 2011 | Open de Saint-Malo, France | 100,000 | Clay | (Germany) Jasmin Wöhr | (Russia) Nina Bratchikova (Croatia) Darija Jurak | 4–6 2–6 |
| Win | 16–9 | May 2014 | Open de Cagnes-sur-Mer, France | 100,000 | Clay | (Netherlands) Kiki Bertens | (Argentina) Tatiana Búa (Chile) Daniela Seguel | 7–6, 6–4 |
| Win | 17–9 | Jun 2018 | Southsea Trophy, UK | 100,000 | Grass | (Belgium) Kirsten Flipkens | (Poland) Alicja Rosolska (United States) Abigail Spears | 6–4, 3–6, [11–9] |

=== Top 10 wins ===
| # | Player | vsRank | Event | Surface | Round | Score |
|---|---|---|---|---|---|---|
2011
| 1. | (China) Li Na | 7 | Miami Open, United States | Hard | 2R | 7–5, 6–7^{(5–7)}, 7–6^{(7–5)} |
2016
| 2. | (Italy) Roberta Vinci | 8 | Connecticut Open, United States | Hard | QF | 7–6^{(11–9)}, 6–1 |
