= 2016 Nürnberger Versicherungscup =

- Date: 15 – 21 May
- Edition: 4th
- Category: WTA International
- Draw: 32S / 16D
- Prize money: $250,000
- Surface: Clay / outdoor
- Location: Nuremberg, Germany
- Venue: Tennis-Club 1. FC Nürnberg

Champions

Singles
- (Netherlands) Kiki Bertens

Doubles
- (Netherlands) Kiki Bertens / (Sweden) Johanna Larsson
- Nürnberger Versicherungscup

The 2016 Nürnberger Versicherungscup was a professional tennis tournament played on outdoor clay courts. It was the fourth edition of the tournament, and part of the WTA International tier of the 2016 WTA Tour. It took place in Nuremberg, Germany, on 15 May until 21 May 2016. Unseeded Kiki Bertens, who entered the main draw as a qualifier, won the singles title.

== Finals ==
=== Singles ===
(Netherlands) Kiki Bertens defeated (Colombia) Mariana Duque Mariño, 6–2, 6–2

- It was Bertens' only singles title of the year and the 2nd of her career.

=== Doubles ===
(Netherlands) Kiki Bertens / (Sweden) Johanna Larsson defeated (Japan) Shuko Aoyama / (Czech Republic) Renata Voráčová, 6–3, 6–4

- It was Bertens' 1st doubles title of the year and the 3rd of her career. It was Larsson's 1st doubles title of the year and the 5th of her career.

== Points and prize money ==
=== Point distribution ===
Event	W	F	SF	QF	Round of 16	Round of 32	Q	Q2	Q1
Singles	280	180	110	60	30	1	18	12	1
Doubles	280	180	110	60	1	—N/a	—N/a	—N/a	—N/a

=== Prize money ===
Event	W	F	SF	QF	Round of 16	Round of 32	Q2	Q1
Singles	€34,677	€17,258	€9,274	€4,980	€2,742	€1,694	€823	€484
Doubles	€9,919	€5,161	€2,770	€1,468	€774	—N/a	—N/a	—N/a

== Singles main draw entrants ==
=== Seeds ===
Country	Player	Rank^{1}	Seed
ITA	Roberta Vinci	7	1
GER	Laura Siegemund	38	2
GER	Annika Beck	41	3
UKR	Lesia Tsurenko	42	4
GER	Sabine Lisicki	44	5
JPN	Misaki Doi	45	6
GER	Anna-Lena Friedsam	50	7
KAZ	Yulia Putintseva	54	8

- ^{1} Rankings as of 9 May 2016.

=== Other entrants ===
The following players received wildcards into the singles main draw:

- (Austria) Mira Antonitsch
- (Germany) Katharina Gerlach
- (Germany) Katharina Hobgarski

The following players received entry from the qualifying draw:

- (Netherlands) Kiki Bertens
- (Ukraine) Olga Fridman
- (Czech Republic) Barbora Krejčíková
- (Germany) Tatjana Maria
- (Russia) Marina Melnikova
- (Liechtenstein) Stephanie Vogt

The following players received entry as lucky losers:

- (Romania) Cristina Dinu
- (Germany) Antonia Lottner

=== Withdrawals ===
Before the tournament

- (Germany) Mona Barthel → replaced by (Germany) Carina Witthöft
- (Germany) Angelique Kerber → replaced by (Latvia) Anastasija Sevastova
- (United States) Madison Keys → replaced by (Slovenia) Polona Hercog
- (Italy) Karin Knapp → replaced by (United States) Bethanie Mattek-Sands
- (United States) Bethanie Mattek-Sands → replaced by (Germany) Antonia Lottner
- (Latvia) Anastasija Sevastova → replaced by (Romania) Cristina Dinu

During the tournament

- (Ukraine) Lesia Tsurenko

=== Retirements ===
- (United States) Irina Falconi

== Doubles main draw entrants ==
=== Seeds ===
Country	Player	Country	Player	Rank^{1}	Seed
NED	Kiki Bertens	SWE	Johanna Larsson	103	1
GEO	Oksana Kalashnikova	GER	Tatjana Maria	106	2
ROU	Raluca Olaru	LIE	Stephanie Vogt	128	3
RUS	Vera Dushevina	AUS	Anastasia Rodionova	129	4

- ^{1} Rankings as of 9 May 2016.

=== Other entrants ===
The following pairs received wildcards into the doubles main draw:

- (Germany) Katharina Hobgarski / (Germany) Carina Witthöft
- (Austria) Sandra Klemenschits / (Germany) Antonia Lottner

=== Withdrawals ===
During the tournament

- (Germany) Anna-Lena Friedsam (lower back injury)
