= 2017 Nürnberger Versicherungscup =

- Date: 22 – 28 May
- Edition: 5th
- Category: WTA International
- Draw: 32S / 16D
- Prize money: $250,000
- Surface: Clay / outdoor
- Location: Nuremberg, Germany
- Venue: Tennis-Club 1. FC Nürnberg

Champions

Singles
- (Netherlands) Kiki Bertens

Doubles
- (United States) Nicole Melichar / (United Kingdom) Anna Smith
- Nürnberger Versicherungscup

The 2017 Nürnberger Versicherungscup was a professional women's tennis tournament played on outdoor clay courts. It was the 5th edition of the tournament, and part of the WTA International series of the 2017 WTA Tour. It took place in Nuremberg, Germany from 22 May until 28 May 2017. First-seeded Kiki Bertens won her second consecutive singles title at the event.

== Finals ==
=== Singles ===
(Netherlands) Kiki Bertens defeated (Czech Republic) Barbora Krejčíková, 6–2, 6–1

- It was Bertens' 1st singles title of the year and the 3rd of her career.

=== Doubles ===
(United States) Nicole Melichar / (United Kingdom) Anna Smith defeated (Belgium) Kirsten Flipkens / (Sweden) Johanna Larsson, 3–6, 6–3, [11–9]

- It was Melichar's only doubles title of the year and the 1st of her career. It was Smith's only doubles title of her career.

== Points and prize money ==
=== Point distribution ===
Event	W	F	SF	QF	Round of 16	Round of 32	Q	Q2	Q1
Singles	280	180	110	60	30	1	18	12	1
Doubles	280	180	110	60	1	—N/a	—N/a	—N/a	—N/a

=== Prize money ===
Event	W	F	SF	QF	Round of 16	Round of 32	Q2	Q1
Singles	€34,677	€17,258	€9,274	€4,980	€2,742	€1,694	€823	€484
Doubles	€9,919	€5,161	€2,770	€1,468	€774	—N/a	—N/a	—N/a

== Singles main draw entrants ==
=== Seeds ===
Country	Player	Rank^{1}	Seed
NED	Kiki Bertens	20	1
KAZ	Yulia Putintseva	29	2
CHN	Zhang Shuai	31	3
GER	Laura Siegemund	32	4
USA	Alison Riske	36	5
GER	Julia Görges	45	6
KAZ	Yaroslava Shvedova	47	7
ROU	Monica Niculescu	48	8

- ^{1} Rankings as of May 15, 2017.

=== Other entrants ===
The following players received wildcards into the singles main draw:

- (Germany) Katharina Gerlach
- (Germany) Katharina Hobgarski
- (Germany) Tatjana Maria

The following players received entry using a protected ranking:

- (Croatia) Ajla Tomljanović

The following players received entry from the qualifying draw:

- (Czech Republic) Marie Bouzková
- (Romania) Alexandra Cadanțu
- (Czech Republic) Barbora Krejčíková
- (Germany) Lena Rüffer
- (Switzerland) Amra Sadiković
- (Germany) Anna Zaja

The following player received entry as a lucky loser:

- (Israel) Julia Glushko

=== Withdrawals ===
Before the tournament

- (Germany) Mona Barthel -replaced by (Greece) Maria Sakkari
- (Canada) Eugenie Bouchard -replaced by (Israel) Julia Glushko
- (Latvia) Anastasija Sevastova -replaced by (Russia) Evgeniya Rodina
- (Ukraine) Lesia Tsurenko -replaced by (Japan) Nao Hibino

=== Retirements ===
- (Romania) Alexandra Cadanțu
- (Japan) Misaki Doi
- (Romania) Monica Niculescu
- (Greece) Maria Sakkari
- (Kazakhstan) Yaroslava Shvedova
- (Germany) Laura Siegemund

== Doubles main draw entrants ==
=== Seeds ===
Country	Player	Country	Player	Rank^{1}	Seed
IND	Sania Mirza	KAZ	Yaroslava Shvedova	21	1
SLO	Andreja Klepač	ESP	María José Martínez Sánchez	65	2
~~CZE~~	~~Barbora Krejčiková~~	~~ROU~~	~~Monica Niculescu~~	~~66~~	~~3~~
USA	Raquel Atawo	UKR	Kateryna Bondarenko	91	4

- ^{1} Rankings as of May 15, 2017.

=== Other entrants ===
The following pairs received wildcards into the doubles main draw:

- (Germany) Annika Beck / (Germany) Anna Zaja
- (Germany) Katharina Gerlach / (Germany) Katharina Hobgarski

The following pair received entry as alternates:

- (United States) Varvara Lepchenko / (Russia) Evgeniya Rodina

=== Withdrawals ===
Before the tournament

- (Romania) Monica Niculescu

During the tournament

- (Japan) Misaki Doi
