= 2017 Nürnberger Versicherungscup – Doubles =

Doubles
- 2017 Nürnberger Versicherungscup

Final
- Champions: (United States) Nicole Melichar (United Kingdom) Anna Smith
- Runners-up: (Belgium) Kirsten Flipkens (Sweden) Johanna Larsson
- Score: 3–6, 6–3, [11–9]

Details
- Draw: 16
- Seeds: 4

Events
Singles	Doubles
- Nürnberger Versicherungscup

Kiki Bertens and Johanna Larsson were the defending champions, but Bertens chose not to participate this year. Larsson played alongside Kirsten Flipkens, but lost in the final to Nicole Melichar and Anna Smith, 6–3, 3–6, [9–11].

== Seeds ==
1. (India) Sania Mirza / (Kazakhstan) Yaroslava Shvedova (first round)
2. (Slovenia) Andreja Klepač / (Spain) María José Martínez Sánchez (semifinals)
3. (Czech Republic) Barbora Krejčíková / (Romania) Monica Niculescu (withdrew)
4. (United States) Raquel Atawo / (Ukraine) Kateryna Bondarenko (first round)

== Draw ==
Key

- Q = Qualifier
- WC = Wild card
- LL = Lucky loser
- Alt = Alternate
- ITF = ITF entry
- PR = Protected ranking
- SR = Special ranking
- SE = Special exempt
- JE = Junior exempt
- JR = Junior Accelerator Programme entrant
- CO = College Accelerator Programme entrant
- NG = Next Gen Accelerator Program entrant
- w/o = Walkover
- r = Retired
- d = Defaulted

=== Draw ===
First round
1	(India) S Mirza (Kazakhstan) Y Shvedova	5	2
(Chinese Taipei) C-j Chuang (Japan) M Doi	7	6
(Ukraine) L Kichenok (Ukraine) N Kichenok	3	3
(Colombia) M Duque Mariño (Japan) N Hibino	6	6
Alt	(United States) V Lepchenko (Russia) E Rodina	3	7	[10]
(United States) N Melichar (United Kingdom) A Smith	6	5	[12]
(Czech Republic) R Voráčová (Kazakhstan) G Voskoboeva	6	4	[2]
(Romania) A Cadanțu (Germany) N Geuer	2	6	[10]
(Switzerland) X Knoll (Netherlands) D Schuurs	6	6
WC	(Germany) K Gerlach (Germany) K Hobgarski	2	3
(Belgium) K Flipkens (Sweden) J Larsson	7	6
4	(United States) R Atawo (Ukraine) K Bondarenko	5	2
(Argentina) M Irigoyen (Poland) P Kania	6	6^{5}	[10]
WC	(Germany) A Beck (Germany) A Zaja	2	7^{7}	[8]
(Czech Republic) E Hrdinová (Czech Republic) L Kunčíková	6	3	[3]
2	(Slovenia) A Klepač (Spain) MJ Martínez Sánchez	2	6	[10]

Quarterfinals
(Chinese Taipei) C-j Chuang (Japan) M Doi	7^{7}	6^{4}	[10]
(Colombia) M Duque Mariño (Japan) N Hibino	6^{5}	7^{7}	[6]
(United States) N Melichar (United Kingdom) A Smith	6	6
(Romania) A Cadanțu (Germany) N Geuer	0	2
(Switzerland) X Knoll (Netherlands) D Schuurs	7	6^{3}	[7]
(Belgium) K Flipkens (Sweden) J Larsson	5	7^{7}	[10]
(Argentina) M Irigoyen (Poland) P Kania	0	6^{5}
2	(Slovenia) A Klepač (Spain) MJ Martínez Sánchez	6	7^{7}

Semifinals
(Chinese Taipei) C-j Chuang (Japan) M Doi
(United States) N Melichar (United Kingdom) A Smith	w/o
(Belgium) K Flipkens (Sweden) J Larsson	1	6	[10]
2	(Slovenia) A Klepač (Spain) MJ Martínez Sánchez	6	1	[8]

Final
(United States) N Melichar (United Kingdom) A Smith	3	6	[11]
(Belgium) K Flipkens (Sweden) J Larsson	6	3	[9]
