= 2016 Nürnberger Versicherungscup – Singles =

Singles
- 2016 Nürnberger Versicherungscup

Final
- Champion: (Netherlands) Kiki Bertens
- Runner-up: (Colombia) Mariana Duque Mariño
- Score: 6–2, 6–2

Details
- Draw: 32
- Seeds: 8

Events
Singles	Doubles
← 2015 ·	Nürnberger Versicherungscup	· 2017 →

Karin Knapp was the defending champion, but withdrew before the tournament began.

Kiki Bertens won the title, defeating Mariana Duque Mariño in the final, 6–2, 6–2.

== Seeds ==
1. (Italy) Roberta Vinci (second round)
2. (Germany) Laura Siegemund (second round)
3. (Germany) Annika Beck (semifinals)
4. (Ukraine) Lesia Tsurenko (quarterfinals, withdrew)
5. (Germany) Sabine Lisicki (second round)
6. (Japan) Misaki Doi (second round)
7. (Germany) Anna-Lena Friedsam (quarterfinals)
8. (Kazakhstan) Yulia Putintseva (second round)

== Draw ==
Key

- Q = Qualifier
- WC = Wild card
- LL = Lucky loser
- Alt = Alternate
- ITF = ITF entry
- PR = Protected ranking
- SR = Special ranking
- SE = Special exempt
- JE = Junior exempt
- JR = Junior Accelerator Programme entrant
- CO = College Accelerator Programme entrant
- NG = Next Gen Accelerator Program entrant
- w/o = Walkover
- r = Retired
- d = Defaulted

=== Finals ===
Semifinals
Q	(Netherlands) Kiki Bertens	3	6	7^{7}
(Germany) Julia Görges	6	4	6^{4}
3	(Germany) Annika Beck	5	1
(Colombia) Mariana Duque Mariño	7	6

Final
Q	(Netherlands) Kiki Bertens	6	6
(Colombia) Mariana Duque Mariño	2	2

=== Top half ===
First round
1	(Italy) R Vinci	6	2	6
Q	(Czech Republic) B Krejčíková	2	6	3
Q	(Netherlands) K Bertens	6	7^{7}
Q	(Germany) T Maria	1	6^{0}
WC	(Germany) K Gerlach	0	3
(United States) I Falconi	6	6
LL	(Germany) A Lottner	3	6^{8}
6	(Japan) M Doi	6	7^{10}
4	(Ukraine) L Tsurenko	7	6
WC	(Austria) M Antonitsch	5	1
Q	(Liechtenstein) S Vogt	5	6^{4}
(Slovenia) P Hercog	7	7^{7}
(Germany) J Görges	6	6
LL	(Romania) C Dinu	1	2
Q	(Ukraine) O Fridman	7^{7}	2	5
8	(Kazakhstan) Y Putintseva	6^{0}	6	7

Second round
1	(Italy) R Vinci	4	6^{4}
Q	(Netherlands) K Bertens	6	7^{7}
(United States) I Falconi	6	5	6
6	(Japan) M Doi	3	7	4
4	(Ukraine) L Tsurenko	5	6	6
(Slovenia) P Hercog	7	4	2
(Germany) J Görges	6	6
8	(Kazakhstan) Y Putintseva	4	2

Quarterfinals
Q	(Netherlands) K Bertens	6	0
(United States) I Falconi	1	1^{r}
4	(Ukraine) L Tsurenko
(Germany) J Görges	w/o

Semifinals
Q	(Netherlands) K Bertens	3	6	7^{7}
(Germany) J Görges	6	4	6^{4}

=== Bottom half ===
First round
7	(Germany) A-L Friedsam	6	6
(Sweden) J Larsson	3	4
(Japan) N Hibino	6	6^{2}	2
(United States) C McHale	4	7^{7}	6
(Czech Republic) Kr Plíšková	4	3
(United States) N Gibbs	6	6
(Brazil) T Pereira	0	4
3	(Germany) A Beck	6	6
5	(Germany) S Lisicki	6	6
(Spain) L Arruabarrena	3	4
WC	(Germany) K Hobgarski	0	3
(United States) V Lepchenko	6	6
(Germany) C Witthöft	4	6	4
(Colombia) M Duque Mariño	6	4	6
Q	(Russia) M Melnikova	1	0
2	(Germany) L Siegemund	6	6

Second round
7	(Germany) A-L Friedsam	6	6
(United States) C McHale	4	3
(United States) N Gibbs	2	1
3	(Germany) A Beck	6	6
5	(Germany) S Lisicki	2	6^{5}
(United States) V Lepchenko	6	7^{7}
(Colombia) M Duque Mariño	7^{8}	3	6
2	(Germany) L Siegemund	6^{6}	6	1

Quarterfinals
7	(Germany) A-L Friedsam	6^{6}	6	2
3	(Germany) A Beck	7^{8}	2	6
(United States) V Lepchenko	7	6^{4}	5
(Colombia) M Duque Mariño	5	7^{7}	7

Semifinals
3	(Germany) A Beck	5	1
(Colombia) M Duque Mariño	7	6

== Qualifying ==
=== Seeds ===
1. (Netherlands) Kiki Bertens (qualified)
2. (Germany) Tatjana Maria (qualified)
3. (Turkey) İpek Soylu (qualifying competition)
4. (Czech Republic) Tereza Martincová (qualifying competition)
5. (Czech Republic) Barbora Krejčíková (qualified)
6. (Bulgaria) Elitsa Kostova (qualifying competition)
7. (France) Myrtille Georges (first round)
8. (Serbia) Jovana Jakšić (first round)
9. (China) Lu Jiajing (qualifying competition)
10. (Spain) Laura Pous Tió (first round)
11. (Romania) Cristina Dinu (qualifying competition, lucky loser)
12. (Liechtenstein) Stephanie Vogt (qualified)

=== Qualifiers ===
1. (Netherlands) Kiki Bertens
2. (Germany) Tatjana Maria
3. (Ukraine) Olga Fridman
4. (Liechtenstein) Stephanie Vogt
5. (Czech Republic) Barbora Krejčíková
6. (Russia) Marina Melnikova

=== Lucky losers ===
1. (Romania) Cristina Dinu
2. (Germany) Antonia Lottner

=== Draw ===
==== First qualifier ====
First round
1	(Netherlands) Kiki Bertens	6	6
(Switzerland) Conny Perrin	1	0
(Poland) Katarzyna Piter	3	6	2
11	(Romania) Cristina Dinu	6	3	6

Qualifying competition
1	(Netherlands) Kiki Bertens	6	6
11	(Romania) Cristina Dinu	1	3

==== Second qualifier ====
First round
2	(Germany) Tatjana Maria	6	6
WC	(Germany) Lara Schmidt	1	0
WC	(Germany) Antonia Lottner	4	7	7^{7}
10	(Spain) Laura Pous Tió	6	5	6^{3}

Qualifying competition
2	(Germany) Tatjana Maria	7^{7}	6
WC	(Germany) Antonia Lottner	6^{4}	4

==== Third qualifier ====
First round
3	(Turkey) İpek Soylu	6	6
(Romania) Alexandra Cadanțu	2	3
(Ukraine) Olga Fridman	7^{7}	6
8	(Serbia) Jovana Jakšić	6^{3}	4

Qualifying competition
3	(Turkey) İpek Soylu	6^{5}	2
(Ukraine) Olga Fridman	7^{7}	6

==== Fourth qualifier ====
First round
4	(Czech Republic) Tereza Martincová	6	6
(Thailand) Varatchaya Wongteanchai	2	3
(Czech Republic) Jesika Malečková	6	6^{8}	3
12	(Liechtenstein) Stephanie Vogt	4	7^{10}	6

Qualifying competition
4	(Czech Republic) Tereza Martincová	6	6^{2}	1
12	(Liechtenstein) Stephanie Vogt	1	7^{7}	6

==== Fifth qualifier ====
First round
5	(Czech Republic) Barbora Krejčíková	6	7^{8}
WC	(Germany) Anna Zaja	2	6^{6}
(Turkey) Başak Eraydın	4	1
9	(China) Lu Jiajing	6	6

Qualifying competition
5	(Czech Republic) Barbora Krejčíková	4	7	6
9	(China) Lu Jiajing	6	5	2

==== Sixth qualifier ====
First round
6	(Bulgaria) Elitsa Kostova	6	6
WC	(Germany) Lena Rüffer	2	2
(Russia) Marina Melnikova	6	3	6
7	(France) Myrtille Georges	1	6	1

Qualifying competition
6	(Bulgaria) Elitsa Kostova	3	4
(Russia) Marina Melnikova	6	6
