= 2017 Nürnberger Versicherungscup – Singles =

Singles
- 2017 Nürnberger Versicherungscup

Final
- Champion: (Netherlands) Kiki Bertens
- Runner-up: (Czech Republic) Barbora Krejčíková
- Score: 6–2, 6–1

Details
- Draw: 32
- Seeds: 8

Events
Singles	Doubles
← 2016 ·	Nürnberger Versicherungscup	· 2018 →

Kiki Bertens was the defending champion and successfully defended her title, defeating Barbora Krejčíková in the final, 6–2, 6–1.

== Seeds ==
1. (Netherlands) Kiki Bertens (champion)
2. (Kazakhstan) Yulia Putintseva (quarterfinals)
3. (China) Zhang Shuai (first round)
4. (Germany) Laura Siegemund (second round, retired)
5. (United States) Alison Riske (quarterfinals)
6. (Germany) Julia Görges (second round)
7. (Kazakhstan) Yaroslava Shvedova (quarterfinals, retired)
8. (Romania) Monica Niculescu (first round, retired)

== Draw ==
Key

- Q = Qualifier
- WC = Wild card
- LL = Lucky loser
- Alt = Alternate
- ITF = ITF entry
- PR = Protected ranking
- SR = Special ranking
- SE = Special exempt
- JE = Junior exempt
- JR = Junior Accelerator Programme entrant
- CO = College Accelerator Programme entrant
- NG = Next Gen Accelerator Program entrant
- w/o = Walkover
- r = Retired
- d = Defaulted

=== Finals ===
Semifinals
1	(Netherlands) Kiki Bertens	6	0
(Japan) Misaki Doi	2	1^{r}
Q	(Czech Republic) Barbora Krejčíková	6	4	6
(Romania) Sorana Cîrstea	4	6	0

Final
1	(Netherlands) Kiki Bertens	6	6
Q	(Czech Republic) Barbora Krejčíková	2	1

=== Top half ===
First round
1	(Netherlands) K Bertens	6	6
WC	(Germany) K Gerlach	2	1
(Germany) A Beck	6	6
Q	(Germany) L Rüffer	3	3
(Belgium) K Flipkens	6	4	6
PR	(Croatia) A Tomljanović	2	6	3
(Belgium) E Mertens	4	6	3
5	(United States) A Riske	6	4	6
3	(China) S Zhang	7^{13}	3	4
(France) O Dodin	6^{11}	6	6
(Greece) M Sakkari	6^{0}	0^{r}
(Japan) M Doi	7^{7}	0
WC	(Germany) T Maria	6	6
Q	(Czech Republic) M Bouzková	0	1
Q	(Germany) A Zaja	6	5	1
7	(Kazakhstan) Y Shvedova	3	7	6

Second round
1	(Netherlands) K Bertens	7	6
(Germany) A Beck	5	2
(Belgium) K Flipkens	2	2
5	(United States) A Riske	6	6
(France) O Dodin	6	0	3
(Japan) M Doi	3	6	6
WC	(Germany) T Maria	2	4
7	(Kazakhstan) Y Shvedova	6	6

Quarterfinals
1	(Netherlands) K Bertens	6	6
5	(United States) A Riske	4	3
(Japan) M Doi	6	0
7	(Kazakhstan) Y Shvedova	4	0^{r}

Semifinals
1	(Netherlands) K Bertens	6	0
(Japan) M Doi	2	1^{r}

=== Bottom half ===
First round
6	(Germany) J Görges	7	6
(Japan) N Hibino	5	1
(Germany) C Witthöft	6	6
(Sweden) J Larsson	1	0
Q	(Romania) A Cadanțu	4	2^{r}
Q	(Czech Republic) B Krejčíková	6	5
WC	(Germany) K Hobgarski	0	1
4	(Germany) L Siegemund	6	6
8	(Romania) M Niculescu	4	0^{r}
(Romania) S Cîrstea	6	1
(United States) V Lepchenko	6	6
(Russia) E Rodina	2	2
Q	(Switzerland) A Sadiković	6^{15}	7^{7}	2
(Belgium) Y Wickmayer	7^{17}	6^{4}	6
LL	(Israel) J Glushko	4	7	0
2	(Kazakhstan) Y Putintseva	6	5	6

Second round
6	(Germany) J Görges	1	5
(Germany) C Witthöft	6	7
Q	(Czech Republic) B Krejčíková	4	5
4	(Germany) L Siegemund	6	5^{r}
(Romania) S Cîrstea	6	6^{4}	6
(United States) V Lepchenko	0	7^{7}	3
(Belgium) Y Wickmayer	4	0
2	(Kazakhstan) Y Putintseva	6	6

Quarterfinals
(Germany) C Witthöft	6	3	6^{2}
Q	(Czech Republic) B Krejčíková	3	6	7^{7}
(Romania) S Cîrstea	6	3	6
2	(Kazakhstan) Y Putintseva	3	6	4

Semifinals
Q	(Czech Republic) B Krejčíková	6	4	6
(Romania) S Cîrstea	4	6	0

== Qualifying ==
=== Seeds ===
1. (Ukraine) Kateryna Bondarenko (first round)
2. (Paraguay) Verónica Cepede Royg (withdrew)
3. (Slovenia) Dalila Jakupović (withdrew)
4. (New Zealand) Marina Erakovic (first round)
5. (Netherlands) Cindy Burger (withdrew)
6. (Russia) Anastasiya Komardina (first round)
7. (France) Fiona Ferro (first round)
8. (Russia) Valeriya Solovyeva (first round)
9. (Czech Republic) Marie Bouzková (qualified)
10. (Switzerland) Amra Sadiković (qualified)
11. (Russia) Viktoria Kamenskaya (qualifying competition)
12. (Czech Republic) Jesika Malečková (first round)

=== Qualifiers ===
1. (Romania) Alexandra Cadanțu
2. (Germany) Anna Zaja
3. (Czech Republic) Barbora Krejčíková
4. (Switzerland) Amra Sadiković
5. (Germany) Lena Rüffer
6. (Czech Republic) Marie Bouzková

=== Lucky loser ===
1. (Israel) Julia Glushko

=== Draw ===
==== First qualifier ====
First round
1	(Ukraine) Kateryna Bondarenko	6	4	4
(Romania) Alexandra Cadanțu	0	6	6
WC	(Austria) Mira Antonitsch	7^{8}	6
8	(Russia) Valeriya Solovyeva	6^{6}	3

Qualifying competition
(Romania) Alexandra Cadanțu	5	6	6
WC	(Austria) Mira Antonitsch	7	1	1

==== Second qualifier ====
First round
Alt	(United States) Nicole Melichar	3	6	4
(Israel) Julia Glushko	6	1	6
(Germany) Anna Zaja	7	6
7	(France) Fiona Ferro	5	2

Qualifying competition
(Israel) Julia Glushko	6^{4}	0
(Germany) Anna Zaja	7^{7}	6

==== Third qualifier ====
First round
Alt	(Czech Republic) Petra Krejsová	6	1
(Brazil) Teliana Pereira	3	0^{r}
(Czech Republic) Barbora Krejčíková	6	2	6
12	(Czech Republic) Jesika Malečková	3	6	2

Qualifying competition
Alt	(Czech Republic) Petra Krejsová	4	4
(Czech Republic) Barbora Krejčíková	6	6

==== Fourth qualifier ====
First round
4	(New Zealand) Marina Erakovic	4	6^{5}
(Bulgaria) Aleksandrina Naydenova	6	7^{7}
WC	(Germany) Lara Schmidt	3	4
10	(Switzerland) Amra Sadiković	6	6

Qualifying competition
(Bulgaria) Aleksandrina Naydenova	1	3
10	(Switzerland) Amra Sadiković	6	6

==== Fifth qualifier ====
First round
Alt	(Kazakhstan) Galina Voskoboeva	2	3
WC	(Germany) Lena Rüffer	6	6
(Poland) Paula Kania	3	7^{7}	5
11	(Russia) Viktoria Kamenskaya	6	6^{3}	7

Qualifying competition
WC	(Germany) Lena Rüffer	6	6
11	(Russia) Viktoria Kamenskaya	2	3

==== Sixth qualifier ====
First round
6	(Russia) Anastasiya Komardina	2	6	6^{2}
(Japan) Mayo Hibi	6	3	7^{7}
WC	(South Africa) Zoe Kruger	2	3
9	(Czech Republic) Marie Bouzková	6	6

Qualifying competition
(Japan) Mayo Hibi	1	1
9	(Czech Republic) Marie Bouzková	6	6
