= 2016 Nürnberger Versicherungscup – Doubles =

Doubles
- 2016 Nürnberger Versicherungscup

Final
- Champion: (Netherlands) Kiki Bertens (Sweden) Johanna Larsson
- Runner-up: (Japan) Shuko Aoyama (Czech Republic) Renata Voráčová
- Score: 6–3, 6–4

Details
- Draw: 16
- Seeds: 4

Events
Singles	Doubles
- Nürnberger Versicherungscup

Chan Hao-ching and Anabel Medina Garrigues were the defending champions, but Chan chose not to participate this year and Medina Garrigues chose to compete in Strasbourg instead.
Kiki Bertens and Johanna Larsson won the title, defeating Shuko Aoyama and Renata Voráčová in the final, 6–3, 6–4.

== Seeds ==
1. (Netherlands) Kiki Bertens / (Sweden) Johanna Larsson (champions)
2. (Georgia (country)) Oksana Kalashnikova / (Germany) Tatjana Maria (quarterfinals)
3. (Romania) Raluca Olaru / (Liechtenstein) Stephanie Vogt (first round)
4. (Russia) Vera Dushevina / (Australia) Anastasia Rodionova (first round)

== Draw ==
Key

- Q = Qualifier
- WC = Wild card
- LL = Lucky loser
- Alt = Alternate
- ITF = ITF entry
- PR = Protected ranking
- SR = Special ranking
- SE = Special exempt
- JE = Junior exempt
- JR = Junior Accelerator Programme entrant
- CO = College Accelerator Programme entrant
- NG = Next Gen Accelerator Program entrant
- w/o = Walkover
- r = Retired
- d = Defaulted

First round
1	(Netherlands) K Bertens (Sweden) J Larsson	6	6
(Australia) J Moore (Thailand) V Wongteanchai	0	0
(Germany) C Daniels (Belarus) L Marozava	6	7^{7}
(United Kingdom) T Moore (Switzerland) C Perrin	2	6^{4}
4	(Russia) V Dushevina (Australia) An Rodionova	6	3	[4]
(Chinese Taipei) C-w Chan (Netherlands) D Schuurs	3	6	[10]
(Germany) A Beck (Germany) A-L Friedsam	6	3	[10]
WC	(Germany) K Hobgarski (Germany) C Witthöft	3	6	[5]
(Germany) A-L Grönefeld (Czech Republic) K Peschke	6	6
WC	(Austria) S Klemenschits (Germany) A Lottner	2	2
(Japan) S Aoyama (Czech Republic) R Voráčová	6	6
3	(Romania) R Olaru (Liechtenstein) S Vogt	3	3
(Russia) N Dzalamidze (Russia) V Kudermetova	6	6
(Japan) N Hibino (Brazil) L Pigossi	2	3
(Russia) V Ivakhnenko (Russia) M Melnikova	6^{6}	7^{7}	[8]
2	(Georgia (country)) O Kalashnikova (Germany) T Maria	7^{8}	6^{4}	[10]

Quarterfinals
1	(Netherlands) K Bertens (Sweden) J Larsson	6	4	[10]
(Germany) C Daniels (Belarus) L Marozava	3	6	[3]
(Chinese Taipei) C-w Chan (Netherlands) D Schuurs	0	4
(Germany) A Beck (Germany) A-L Friedsam	6	6
(Germany) A-L Grönefeld (Czech Republic) K Peschke	3	5
(Japan) S Aoyama (Czech Republic) R Voráčová	6	7
(Russia) N Dzalamidze (Russia) V Kudermetova	6	2	[10]
2	(Georgia (country)) O Kalashnikova (Germany) T Maria	4	6	[5]

Semifinals
1	(Netherlands) K Bertens (Sweden) J Larsson	w/o
(Germany) A Beck (Germany) A-L Friedsam
(Japan) S Aoyama (Czech Republic) R Voráčová	4	6	[12]
(Russia) N Dzalamidze (Russia) V Kudermetova	6	2	[10]

Final
1	(Netherlands) K Bertens (Sweden) J Larsson	6	6
(Japan) S Aoyama (Czech Republic) R Voráčová	3	4
