= 2018 Western & Southern Open – Women's singles =

Women's singles
- 2018 Western & Southern Open

Final
- Champion: (Netherlands) Kiki Bertens
- Runner-up: (Romania) Simona Halep
- Score: 2–6, 7–6^{(8–6)}, 6–2

Details
- Draw: 56 (12 Q / 5 WC )
- Seeds: 16

Events
Singles	men	women
Doubles	men	women
← 2017 ·	Western & Southern Open	· 2019 →

Kiki Bertens defeated Simona Halep in the final, 2–6, 7–6^{(8–6)}, 6–2 to win the women's singles tennis title at the 2018 Cincinnati Masters. She saved a championship point en route to her first hard court and Premier 5-level title, and defeated the world No. 2 and No. 1 players, in the second round and final, respectively. Bertens became the first Dutchwoman to win the title.

Garbiñe Muguruza was the defending champion, but lost in the second round to Lesia Tsurenko.

== Seeds ==
The top eight seeds received a bye into the second round.

1. (Romania) Simona Halep (final)
2. (Denmark) Caroline Wozniacki (second round, retired)
3. (United States) Sloane Stephens (third round)
4. (Germany) Angelique Kerber (third round)
5. (Ukraine) Elina Svitolina (quarterfinals)
6. (France) Caroline Garcia (third round)
7. (Spain) Garbiñe Muguruza (second round)
8. (Czech Republic) Petra Kvitová (semifinals)

9. (Czech Republic) Karolína Plíšková (second round)
10. (Germany) Julia Görges (first round, retired)
11. (Latvia) Jeļena Ostapenko (first round)
12. (Russia) Daria Kasatkina (first round)
13. (United States) Madison Keys (quarterfinals)
14. (United States) Venus Williams (withdrew)
15. (Belgium) Elise Mertens (quarterfinals)
16. (Australia) Ashleigh Barty (third round)
17. (Japan) Naomi Osaka (first round)

Click on the seed number of a player to go to their draw section.

== Draw ==
=== Key ===
- Q = Qualifier
- WC = Wild card
- LL = Lucky loser
- Alt = Alternate
- ITF = ITF entry
- PR = Protected ranking
- SR = Special ranking
- SE = Special exempt
- JE = Junior exempt
- JR = Junior Accelerator Programme entrant
- CO = College Accelerator Programme entrant
- NG = Next Gen Accelerator Program entrant
- w/o = Walkover
- r = Retired
- d = Defaulted

=== Finals ===
Quarterfinals
1	(Romania) Simona Halep	6	6
(Ukraine) Lesia Tsurenko	4	1
13	(United States) Madison Keys	3	4
(Belarus) Aryna Sabalenka	6	6
8	(Czech Republic) Petra Kvitová	7	5	6
15	(Belgium) Elise Mertens	5	7	3
5	(Ukraine) Elina Svitolina	4	3
(Netherlands) Kiki Bertens	6	6

Semifinals
1	(Romania) Simona Halep	6	6
(Belarus) Aryna Sabalenka	3	4
8	(Czech Republic) Petra Kvitová	6	4	2
(Netherlands) Kiki Bertens	3	6	6

Final
1	(Romania) Simona Halep	6	6^{6}	2
(Netherlands) Kiki Bertens	2	7^{8}	6

=== Top half ===
==== Section 1 ====
First round
(Romania) I-C Begu	6	3	3
Q	(Australia) A Tomljanović	4	6	6
Q	(Estonia) K Kanepi	2	6	6
Q	(United States) V Lepchenko	6	3	1
WC	(Czech Republic) M Vondroušová	3	5
16	(Australia) A Barty	6	7
11	(Latvia) J Ostapenko	6	5	0
Q	(France) A Cornet	1	7	6
Q	(Romania) A Bogdan	3	2
(Russia) E Makarova	6	6
(United States) D Collins	0	2
(Ukraine) L Tsurenko	6	6

Second round
1	(Romania) S Halep	4	6	6
Q	(Australia) A Tomljanović	6	3	3
Q	(Estonia) K Kanepi	5	3
16	(Australia) A Barty	7	6
Q	(France) A Cornet	2	0
(Russia) E Makarova	6	6
(Ukraine) L Tsurenko	2	6	6
7	(Spain) G Muguruza	6	4	4

Third round
1	(Romania) S Halep	7	6
16	(Australia) A Barty	5	4
(Russia) E Makarova	6^{5}	2
(Ukraine) L Tsurenko	7^{7}	6

Quarterfinals
1	(Romania) S Halep	6	6
(Ukraine) L Tsurenko	4	1

==== Section 2 ====
First round
(Russia) A Pavlyuchenkova	6	6
(Serbia) A Krunić	1	0
(Latvia) A Sevastova	2	3
LL	(Italy) C Giorgi	6	6
WC	(United States) B Mattek-Sands	6	6^{3}	4
13	(United States) M Keys	3	7^{7}	6
9	(Czech Republic) Ka Plíšková	6	6
(Poland) A Radwańska	3	3
(United Kingdom) J Konta	6	3	4
(Belarus) A Sabalenka	4	6	6
WC	(Belarus) V Azarenka	6^{5}	6	6
(Spain) C Suárez Navarro	7^{7}	2	4

Second round
4	(Germany) A Kerber	4	7	6
(Russia) A Pavlyuchenkova	6	5	4
LL	(Italy) C Giorgi	2	2
13	(United States) M Keys	6	6
9	(Czech Republic) Ka Plíšková	6	3	5
(Belarus) A Sabalenka	2	6	7
WC	(Belarus) V Azarenka	4	5
6	(France) C Garcia	6	7

Third round
4	(Germany) A Kerber	6	6^{3}	4
13	(United States) M Keys	2	7^{7}	6
(Belarus) A Sabalenka	6	3	7
6	(France) C Garcia	4	6	5

Quarterfinals
13	(United States) M Keys	3	4
(Belarus) A Sabalenka	6	6

=== Bottom half ===
==== Section 3 ====
First round
(Australia) D Gavrilova	1	2
PR	(United States) S Williams	6	6
Q	(Belarus) A Sasnovich	0	6	1
Q	(Slovakia) V Kužmová	6	4	6
(France) K Mladenovic	6	3
10	(Germany) J Görges	4	2^{r}
15	(Belgium) E Mertens	6	6
(Slovakia) M Rybáriková	4	2
Q	(Sweden) R Peterson	2	6	6
(Czech Republic) K Siniaková	6	4	1
Q	(Germany) T Maria	5	6	6
Q	(United States) A Kiick	7	3	3

Second round
8	(Czech Republic) P Kvitová	6	2	6
PR	(United States) S Williams	3	6	3
Q	(Slovakia) V Kužmová	3	0
(France) K Mladenovic	6	6
15	(Belgium) E Mertens	3	6	7^{7}
Q	(Sweden) R Peterson	6	2	6^{1}
Q	(Germany) T Maria	3	2
3	(United States) S Stephens	6	6

Third round
8	(Czech Republic) P Kvitová	6	6
(France) K Mladenovic	4	2
15	(Belgium) E Mertens	7^{10}	6
3	(United States) S Stephens	6^{8}	2

Quarterfinals
8	(Czech Republic) P Kvitová	7	5	6
15	(Belgium) E Mertens	5	7	3

==== Section 4 ====
First round
WC	(Russia) S Kuznetsova	6	2	7^{7}
Q	(Switzerland) S Vögele	4	6	6^{5}
(Hungary) T Babos	3	4
WC	(United States) A Anisimova	6	6
Q	(Croatia) P Martić	4	6	6
12	(Russia) D Kasatkina	6	4	3
17	(Japan) N Osaka	3	6^{8}
(Greece) M Sakkari	6	7^{10}
(Estonia) A Kontaveit	6	6
(Czech Republic) B Strýcová	3	0
(Netherlands) K Bertens	6	6
(United States) C Vandeweghe	2	0

Second round
5	(Ukraine) E Svitolina	7^{7}	4	6
WC	(Russia) S Kuznetsova	6^{1}	6	4
WC	(United States) A Anisimova	6	6
Q	(Croatia) P Martić	4	3
(Greece) M Sakkari	1	3
(Estonia) A Kontaveit	6	6
(Netherlands) K Bertens	6	0
2	(Denmark) C Wozniacki	4	0^{r}

Third round
5	(Ukraine) E Svitolina	6	6
WC	(United States) A Anisimova	4	4
(Estonia) A Kontaveit	3	6	3
(Netherlands) K Bertens	6	2	6

Quarterfinals
5	(Ukraine) E Svitolina	4	3
(Netherlands) K Bertens	6	6

== Qualifying ==
=== Seeds ===
1. (France) Alizé Cornet (qualified)
2. (Belarus) Aliaksandra Sasnovich (qualified)
3. (Croatia) Donna Vekić (qualifying competition)
4. (Italy) Camila Giorgi (qualifying competition, lucky loser)
5. (Belgium) Alison Van Uytvanck (first round, retired)
6. (Chinese Taipei) Hsieh Su-wei (first round)
7. (Switzerland) Belinda Bencic (first round)
8. (Belgium) Kirsten Flipkens (first round)
9. (Estonia) Kaia Kanepi (qualified)
10. (Kazakhstan) Yulia Putintseva (qualifying competition)
11. (Croatia) Petra Martić (qualified)
12. (Romania) Sorana Cîrstea (qualifying competition)
13. (Slovakia) Viktória Kužmová (qualified)
14. (Australia) Ajla Tomljanović (qualified)
15. (Poland) Magda Linette (first round)
16. (Kazakhstan) Zarina Diyas (qualifying competition)
17. (Australia) Samantha Stosur (first round)
18. (Belarus) Vera Lapko (qualifying competition)
19. (United States) Jennifer Brady (qualifying competition)
20. (United States) Sofia Kenin (qualifying competition)
21. (Romania) Monica Niculescu (first round)
22. (Puerto Rico) Monica Puig (first round)
23. (Sweden) Rebecca Peterson (qualified)
24. (United States) Sachia Vickery (first round)

=== Qualifiers ===
1. (France) Alizé Cornet
2. (Belarus) Aliaksandra Sasnovich
3. (Romania) Ana Bogdan
4. (Slovakia) Viktória Kužmová
5. (Switzerland) Stefanie Vögele
6. (Germany) Tatjana Maria
7. (United States) Varvara Lepchenko
8. (United States) Allie Kiick
9. (Estonia) Kaia Kanepi
10. (Sweden) Rebecca Peterson
11. (Croatia) Petra Martić
12. (Australia) Ajla Tomljanović

=== Lucky loser ===
1. (Italy) Camila Giorgi

=== Draw ===
==== First qualifier ====
First round
1	(France) Alizé Cornet	6	6
(United States) Nicole Gibbs	2	1
WC	(United States) Francesca Di Lorenzo	3	3
20	(United States) Sofia Kenin	6	6

Qualifying competition
1	(France) Alizé Cornet	6	6
20	(United States) Sofia Kenin	1	3

==== Second qualifier ====
First round
2	(Belarus) Aliaksandra Sasnovich	2	7	6
(United States) Alison Riske	6	5	2
(Russia) Anna Blinkova	3	5
18	(Belarus) Vera Lapko	6	7

Qualifying competition
2	(Belarus) Aliaksandra Sasnovich	7^{7}	6
18	(Belarus) Vera Lapko	6^{5}	2

==== Third qualifier ====
First round
3	(Croatia) Donna Vekić	6	6
(Germany) Andrea Petkovic	3	3
(Romania) Ana Bogdan	6	7^{10}
21	(Romania) Monica Niculescu	2	6^{8}

Qualifying competition
3	(Croatia) Donna Vekić	3	2
(Romania) Ana Bogdan	6	6

==== Fourth qualifier ====
First round
4	(Italy) Camila Giorgi	6	6
(Spain) Lara Arruabarrena	3	4
WC	(United States) Caroline Dolehide	4	4
13	(Slovakia) Viktória Kužmová	6	6

Qualifying competition
4	(Italy) Camila Giorgi	6	3	5
13	(Slovakia) Viktória Kužmová	3	6	7

==== Fifth qualifier ====
First round
5	(Belgium) Alison Van Uytvanck	6	2	0^{r}
WC	(United States) Jamie Loeb	1	6	3
(Switzerland) Stefanie Vögele	6	6
22	(Puerto Rico) Monica Puig	2	0

Qualifying competition
WC	(United States) Jamie Loeb	4	1
(Switzerland) Stefanie Vögele	6	6

==== Sixth qualifier ====
First round
6	(Chinese Taipei) Hsieh Su-wei	5	3
(Germany) Tatjana Maria	7	6
(Slovenia) Dalila Jakupović	6	0^{r}
19	(United States) Jennifer Brady	2	4

Qualifying competition
(Germany) Tatjana Maria	6	6
19	(United States) Jennifer Brady	3	2

==== Seventh qualifier ====
First round
7	(Switzerland) Belinda Bencic	7	6^{3}	3
(United States) Christina McHale	5	7^{7}	6
(United States) Varvara Lepchenko	4	6	6
24	(United States) Sachia Vickery	6	3	4

Qualifying competition
(United States) Christina McHale	3	6	2
(United States) Varvara Lepchenko	6	2	6

==== Eighth qualifier ====
First round
8	(Belgium) Kirsten Flipkens	3	3
(Russia) Natalia Vikhlyantseva	6	6
WC	(United States) Allie Kiick	7^{7}	6
17	(Australia) Samantha Stosur	6^{4}	1

Qualifying competition
(Russia) Natalia Vikhlyantseva	5	1
WC	(United States) Allie Kiick	7	6

==== Ninth qualifier ====
First round
9	(Estonia) Kaia Kanepi	4	6	6
WC	(Germany) Sabine Lisicki	6	4	3
(Russia) Evgeniya Rodina	5	3
16	(Kazakhstan) Zarina Diyas	7	6

Qualifying competition
9	(Estonia) Kaia Kanepi	6	6
16	(Kazakhstan) Zarina Diyas	3	3

==== Tenth qualifier ====
First round
10	(Kazakhstan) Yulia Putintseva	7	3	6
(Sweden) Johanna Larsson	5	6	0
(Slovakia) Anna Karolína Schmiedlová	4	2
23	(Sweden) Rebecca Peterson	6	6

Qualifying competition
10	(Kazakhstan) Yulia Putintseva	4	1
23	(Sweden) Rebecca Peterson	6	6

==== Eleventh qualifier ====
First round
11	(Croatia) Petra Martić	7	6
WC	(United States) Lauren Davis	5	2
(United States) Bernarda Pera	6	3	6
15	(Poland) Magda Linette	4	6	3

Qualifying competition
11	(Croatia) Petra Martić	6	6
(United States) Bernarda Pera	2	1

==== Twelfth qualifier ====
First round
12	(Romania) Sorana Cîrstea	2	6	6
PR	(United States) Vania King	6	2	3
(Japan) Kurumi Nara	4	3
14	(Australia) Ajla Tomljanović	6	6

Qualifying competition
12	(Romania) Sorana Cîrstea	3	2
14	(Australia) Ajla Tomljanović	6	6

== Sources ==
- Main Draw
- Qualifying Draw
