= 2017 Western & Southern Open – Women's singles =

Women's singles
- 2017 Western & Southern Open

Final
- Champion: (Spain) Garbiñe Muguruza
- Runner-up: (Romania) Simona Halep
- Score: 6–1, 6–0

Details
- Draw: 56 (12 Q / 3 WC )
- Seeds: 16

Events
Singles	men	women
Doubles	men	women
← 2016 ·	Western & Southern Open	· 2018 →

Garbiñe Muguruza defeated Simona Halep in the final, 6–1, 6–0 to win the women's singles tennis title at the 2017 Cincinnati Masters. By losing in the final, Halep failed to take advantage of her third opportunity in 2017 to take over the WTA No. 1 singles ranking when the top ranking was only one match win away.

Karolína Plíšková was the defending champion, but lost in the semifinals to Muguruza.

== Seeds ==
The top eight seeds received a bye into the second round.

1. (Czech Republic) Karolína Plíšková (semifinals)
2. (Romania) Simona Halep (final)
3. (Germany) Angelique Kerber (second round)
4. (Spain) Garbiñe Muguruza (champion)
5. (Ukraine) Elina Svitolina (third round)
6. (Denmark) Caroline Wozniacki (quarterfinals)
7. (United Kingdom) Johanna Konta (quarterfinals)
8. (Russia) Svetlana Kuznetsova (quarterfinals)

9. (United States) Venus Williams (second round)
10. (Poland) Agnieszka Radwańska (first round)
11. (Slovakia) Dominika Cibulková (third round)
12. (Latvia) Jeļena Ostapenko (first round)
13. (France) Kristina Mladenovic (first round)
14. (Czech Republic) Petra Kvitová (second round)
15. (Latvia) Anastasija Sevastova (third round)
16. (United States) Madison Keys (third round)

Click on the seed number of a player to go to their draw section.

== Draw ==
=== Key ===
- Q = Qualifier
- WC = Wild card
- LL = Lucky loser
- Alt = Alternate
- ITF = ITF entry
- PR = Protected ranking
- SR = Special ranking
- SE = Special exempt
- JE = Junior exempt
- JR = Junior Accelerator Programme entrant
- CO = College Accelerator Programme entrant
- NG = Next Gen Accelerator Program entrant
- w/o = Walkover
- r = Retired
- d = Defaulted

=== Finals ===
Quarterfinals
1	(Czech Republic) Karolína Plíšková	6	6
6	(Denmark) Caroline Wozniacki	2	4
4	(Spain) Garbiñe Muguruza	6	5	7
8	(Russia) Svetlana Kuznetsova	2	7	5
(Germany) Julia Görges	1	6^{3}
WC	(United States) Sloane Stephens	6	7^{7}
7	(United Kingdom) Johanna Konta	4	6^{1}
2	(Romania) Simona Halep	6	7^{7}

Semifinals
1	(Czech Republic) Karolína Plíšková	3	2
4	(Spain) Garbiñe Muguruza	6	6
WC	(United States) Sloane Stephens	2	1
2	(Romania) Simona Halep	6	6

Final
4	(Spain) Garbiñe Muguruza	6	6
2	(Romania) Simona Halep	1	0

=== Top half ===
==== Section 1 ====
First round
Q	(Croatia) D Vekić	3	6	3
LL	(Russia) N Vikhlyantseva	6	2	6
(Czech Republic) K Siniaková	2	2
Q	(Italy) C Giorgi	6	6
(Australia) D Gavrilova	6	7^{8}
13	(France) K Mladenovic	0	6^{6}
9	(United States) V Williams	6	6
(United States) A Riske	2	0
Q	(Australia) A Barty	6	6
Q	(United States) V Lepchenko	4	4
(Russia) E Vesnina	4	6	6
(France) C Garcia	6	4	4

Second round
1	(Czech Republic) Ka Plíšková	6	6
LL	(Russia) N Vikhlyantseva	2	3
Q	(Italy) C Giorgi	7^{7}	5	6
(Australia) D Gavrilova	6^{1}	7	3
9	(United States) V Williams	3	6	2
Q	(Australia) A Barty	6	2	6
(Russia) E Vesnina	2	4
6	(Denmark) C Wozniacki	6	6

Third round
1	(Czech Republic) Ka Plíšková	6	4	6
Q	(Italy) C Giorgi	3	6	0
Q	(Australia) A Barty	4	2
6	(Denmark) C Wozniacki	6	6

Quarterfinals
1	(Czech Republic) Ka Plíšková	6	6
6	(Denmark) C Wozniacki	2	4

==== Section 2 ====
First round
(United States) L Davis	3	2
Q	(Brazil) B Haddad Maia	6	6
Q	(Belarus) A Sasnovich	4	2
(Russia) D Kasatkina	6	6
(United States) C Vandeweghe	4	6	3
16	(United States) M Keys	6	3	6
12	(Latvia) J Ostapenko	4	2
Q	(Serbia) A Krunić	6	6
(Croatia) M Lučić-Baroni	3	5
(Spain) C Suárez Navarro	6	7
Q	(Paraguay) V Cepede Royg	4	6	3
(Kazakhstan) Y Putintseva	6	3	6

Second round
4	(Spain) G Muguruza	6	6
Q	(Brazil) B Haddad Maia	2	0
(Russia) D Kasatkina	2	1
16	(United States) M Keys	6	6
Q	(Serbia) A Krunić	2	2
(Spain) C Suárez Navarro	6	6
(Kazakhstan) Y Putintseva	3	4
8	(Russia) S Kuznetsova	6	6

Third round
4	(Spain) G Muguruza	6	3	7^{7}
16	(United States) M Keys	4	6	6^{3}
(Spain) C Suárez Navarro	2	4
8	(Russia) S Kuznetsova	6	6

Quarterfinals
4	(Spain) G Muguruza	6	5	7
8	(Russia) S Kuznetsova	2	7	5

=== Bottom half ===
==== Section 3 ====
First round
(Ukraine) L Tsurenko	5	7^{8}	6
(Russia) A Pavlyuchenkova	7	6^{6}	0
Q	(Canada) F Abanda	3	6	6
Q	(Poland) M Linette	6	4	2
(Germany) J Görges	6	6
10	(Poland) A Radwańska	4	4
14	(Czech Republic) P Kvitová	1	7^{7}	6
(Estonia) A Kontaveit	6	6^{2}	3
WC	(United States) S Stephens	6	7^{7}
(Czech Republic) L Šafářová	4	6^{5}
(Russia) E Makarova	6	6
(Czech Republic) B Strýcová	4	1

Second round
5	(Ukraine) E Svitolina	6	6
(Ukraine) L Tsurenko	1	4
Q	(Canada) F Abanda	4	4
(Germany) J Görges	6	6
14	(Czech Republic) P Kvitová	2	3
WC	(United States) S Stephens	6	6
(Russia) E Makarova	6	1	7^{13}
3	(Germany) A Kerber	4	6	6^{11}

Third round
5	(Ukraine) E Svitolina	5	4
(Germany) J Görges	7	6
WC	(United States) S Stephens	2	6	6
(Russia) E Makarova	6	3	4

Quarterfinals
(Germany) J Görges	1	6^{3}
WC	(United States) S Stephens	6	7^{7}

==== Section 4 ====
First round
WC	(France) O Dodin	3	0
(Netherlands) K Bertens	6	6
(France) A Cornet	7^{7}	3	6
(United States) C Bellis	6^{5}	6	2
(Croatia) A Konjuh	7	5	2
11	(Slovakia) D Cibulková	5	7	6
15	(Latvia) A Sevastova	3	6	6
(China) S Peng	6	4	2
(Hungary) T Babos	5	5
(Italy) R Vinci	7	7
Q	(United States) T Townsend	3	6	6
Q	(Puerto Rico) M Puig	6	3	2

Second round
7	(United Kingdom) J Konta	6	6
(Netherlands) K Bertens	3	3
(France) A Cornet	1	4
11	(Slovakia) D Cibulková	6	6
15	(Latvia) A Sevastova	6	7
(Italy) R Vinci	2	5
Q	(United States) T Townsend	4	1
2	(Romania) S Halep	6	6

Third round
7	(United Kingdom) J Konta	6	6
11	(Slovakia) D Cibulková	3	4
15	(Latvia) A Sevastova	4	3
2	(Romania) S Halep	6	6

Quarterfinals
7	(United Kingdom) J Konta	4	6^{1}
2	(Romania) S Halep	6	7^{7}

== Qualifying ==
=== Seeds ===
1. (Slovakia) Magdaléna Rybáriková (qualifying competition)
2. (Belgium) Elise Mertens (first round)
3. (Germany) Mona Barthel (first round)
4. (Croatia) Donna Vekić (qualified)
5. (Sweden) Johanna Larsson (first round)
6. (Romania) Sorana Cîrstea (first round)
7. (Romania) Monica Niculescu (first round)
8. (Australia) Ashleigh Barty (qualified)
9. (Romania) Irina-Camelia Begu (first round)
10. (Russia) Natalia Vikhlyantseva (qualifying competition, lucky loser)
11. (United States) Christina McHale (first round)
12. (Spain) Lara Arruabarrena (first round)
13. (Germany) Carina Witthöft (qualifying competition)
14. (United States) Varvara Lepchenko (qualified)
15. (Puerto Rico) Monica Puig (qualified)
16. (United Kingdom) Heather Watson (first round)
17. (Paraguay) Verónica Cepede Royg (qualified)
18. (Italy) Francesca Schiavone (qualifying competition)
19. (Brazil) Beatriz Haddad Maia (qualified)
20. (Japan) Misaki Doi (first round)
21. (Russia) Evgeniya Rodina (first round)
22. (Italy) Camila Giorgi (qualified)
23. (Belgium) Kirsten Flipkens (qualifying competition)
24. (Poland) Magda Linette (qualified)

=== Qualifiers ===
1. (Italy) Camila Giorgi
2. (Belarus) Aliaksandra Sasnovich
3. (Poland) Magda Linette
4. (Croatia) Donna Vekić
5. (Brazil) Beatriz Haddad Maia
6. (Serbia) Aleksandra Krunić
7. (Puerto Rico) Monica Puig
8. (Australia) Ashleigh Barty
9. (United States) Taylor Townsend
10. (Canada) Françoise Abanda
11. (Paraguay) Verónica Cepede Royg
12. (United States) Varvara Lepchenko

=== Lucky losers ===
1. (Russia) Natalia Vikhlyantseva

=== Draw ===
==== First qualifier ====
First round
1	(Slovakia) Magdaléna Rybáriková	6	6
(Germany) Andrea Petkovic	4	1
PR	(Japan) Misa Eguchi	6^{3}	3
22	(Italy) Camila Giorgi	7^{7}	6

Qualifying competition
1	(Slovakia) Magdaléna Rybáriková	3	4
22	(Italy) Camila Giorgi	6	6

==== Second qualifier ====
First round
2	(Belgium) Elise Mertens	6	5	2
(Belarus) Aliaksandra Sasnovich	2	7	6
WC	(United States) Sofia Kenin	6	6
21	(Russia) Evgeniya Rodina	3	2

Qualifying competition
(Belarus) Aliaksandra Sasnovich	4	7^{7}	6
WC	(United States) Sofia Kenin	6	6^{4}	3

==== Third qualifier ====
First round
3	(Germany) Mona Barthel	5	2
(Kazakhstan) Zarina Diyas	7	6
WC	(United States) Caroline Dolehide	7^{7}	6^{6}	6^{3}
24	(Poland) Magda Linette	6^{4}	7^{8}	7^{7}

Qualifying competition
(Kazakhstan) Zarina Diyas	4	3
24	(Poland) Magda Linette	6	6

==== Fourth qualifier ====
First round
4	(Croatia) Donna Vekić	6	4	6
(Japan) Kurumi Nara	4	6	3
(Belarus) Aryna Sabalenka	7^{7}	6
16	(United Kingdom) Heather Watson	6^{4}	4

Qualifying competition
4	(Croatia) Donna Vekić	2	6	6
(Belarus) Aryna Sabalenka	6	4	1

==== Fifth qualifier ====
First round
5	(Sweden) Johanna Larsson	4	6^{5}
(Russia) Ekaterina Alexandrova	6	7^{7}
(Romania) Ana Bogdan	3	1
19	(Brazil) Beatriz Haddad Maia	6	6

Qualifying competition
(Russia) Ekaterina Alexandrova	3	6^{3}
19	(Brazil) Beatriz Haddad Maia	6	7^{7}

==== Sixth qualifier ====
First round
6	(Romania) Sorana Cîrstea	7^{7}	3	4
(Serbia) Aleksandra Krunić	6^{1}	6	6
WC	(United States) Nicole Gibbs	7^{7}	2	1
18	(Italy) Francesca Schiavone	6^{1}	6	6

Qualifying competition
(Serbia) Aleksandra Krunić	7^{7}	4	6
18	(Italy) Francesca Schiavone	6^{5}	6	2

==== Seventh qualifier ====
First round
7	(Romania) Monica Niculescu	6	2	1
(Colombia) Mariana Duque Mariño	4	6	6
(Spain) Sara Sorribes Tormo	2	2
15	(Puerto Rico) Monica Puig	6	6

Qualifying competition
(Colombia) Mariana Duque Mariño	4	7^{7}	5
15	(Puerto Rico) Monica Puig	6	6^{4}	7

==== Eighth qualifier ====
First round
8	(Australia) Ashleigh Barty	7	6
(Japan) Risa Ozaki	5	2
(Chinese Taipei) Hsieh Su-wei	3	2
23	(Belgium) Kirsten Flipkens	6	6

Qualifying competition
8	(Australia) Ashleigh Barty	6	6
23	(Belgium) Kirsten Flipkens	1	0

==== Ninth qualifier ====
First round
9	(Romania) Irina-Camelia Begu	7^{7}	1	3
WC	(United States) Taylor Townsend	6^{4}	6	6
(Belgium) Alison Van Uytvanck	2	1
13	(Germany) Carina Witthöft	6	6

Qualifying competition
WC	(United States) Taylor Townsend	6^{2}	7	6
13	(Germany) Carina Witthöft	7^{7}	5	1

==== Tenth qualifier ====
First round
10	(Russia) Natalia Vikhlyantseva	7	6
(Ukraine) Kateryna Bondarenko	5	3
(Canada) Françoise Abanda	6	0	6
20	(Japan) Misaki Doi	2	6	3

Qualifying competition
10	(Russia) Natalia Vikhlyantseva	6^{5}	4
(Canada) Françoise Abanda	7^{7}	6

==== Eleventh qualifier ====
First round
11	(United States) Christina McHale	6	3	2
(Croatia) Petra Martić	1	6	6
WC	(United States) Irina Falconi	6	0	3
17	(Paraguay) Verónica Cepede Royg	2	6	6

Qualifying competition
(Croatia) Petra Martić	3	6	5
17	(Paraguay) Verónica Cepede Royg	6	3	7

==== Twelfth qualifier ====
First round
12	(Spain) Lara Arruabarrena	6	1	6^{9}
(United States) Jennifer Brady	2	6	7^{11}
WC	(United States) Kayla Day	4	4
14	(United States) Varvara Lepchenko	6	6

Qualifying competition
(United States) Jennifer Brady	6^{7}	3
14	(United States) Varvara Lepchenko	7^{9}	6
