= 2016 ATP World Tour Masters 1000 =

Men's professional tennis tour

2016 ATP Masters 1000
Details
- Duration: March 10 – November 6
- Edition: 27th
- Tournaments: 9

Achievements (singles)
- Most titles: (Serbia) Novak Djokovic (4)
- Most finals: (Serbia) Novak Djokovic (United Kingdom) Andy Murray (5)

The twenty-seventh edition of the ATP Masters Series. The champion of each Masters event is awarded 1,000 rankings points.

== Tournaments ==
Tournament	Country	Location	Surface	Prize money
Indian Wells Masters	USA	Indian Wells, California	Hard	$7,037,595
Miami Open	USA	Key Biscayne, Florida	Hard	$7,037,595
Monte-Carlo Masters	France	Roquebrune-Cap-Martin	Clay	€4,094,505
Madrid Open	Spain	Madrid	Clay	€5,719,660
Italian Open	Italy	Rome	Clay	€4,300,755
Canadian Open	Canada	Toronto	Hard	$4,691,730
Cincinnati Masters	USA	Mason, Ohio	Hard	$5,004,505
Shanghai Masters	China	Shanghai	Hard	$7,655,640
Paris Masters	France	Paris	Hard (indoor)	€4,300,755

== Results ==
* First-time champion

Masters	Singles champions	Runners-up	Score	Doubles champions	Runners-up	Score
Indian Wells Singles – Doubles	(Serbia) Novak Djokovic	(Canada) Milos Raonic	6–2, 6–0	(France) Pierre-Hugues Herbert* (France) Nicolas Mahut*	(Canada) Vasek Pospisil (United States) Jack Sock	6–3, 7–6^{(7–5)}
Miami Singles – Doubles	(Serbia) Novak Djokovic	(Japan) Kei Nishikori	6–3, 6–3	(France) Pierre-Hugues Herbert (France) Nicolas Mahut	(South Africa) Raven Klaasen (United States) Rajeev Ram	5–7, 6–1, [10–7]
Monte Carlo Singles – Doubles	(Spain) Rafael Nadal	(France) Gaël Monfils	7–5, 5–7, 6–0	(France) Pierre-Hugues Herbert (France) Nicolas Mahut	(United Kingdom) Jamie Murray (Brazil) Bruno Soares	4–6, 6–0, [10–6]
Madrid Singles – Doubles	(Serbia) Novak Djokovic	(United Kingdom) Andy Murray	6–2, 3–6, 6–3	(Netherlands) Jean-Julien Rojer (Romania) Horia Tecău	(India) Rohan Bopanna (Romania) Florin Mergea	6–4, 7–6^{(7–5)}
Rome Singles – Doubles	(United Kingdom) Andy Murray	(Serbia) Novak Djokovic	6–3, 6–3	(United States) Bob Bryan (United States) Mike Bryan	(Canada) Vasek Pospisil (United States) Jack Sock	2–6, 6–3, [10–7]
Toronto Singles – Doubles	(Serbia) Novak Djokovic	(Japan) Kei Nishikori	6–3, 7–5	(Croatia) Ivan Dodig (Brazil) Marcelo Melo	(United Kingdom) Jamie Murray (Brazil) Bruno Soares	6–4, 6–4
Cincinnati Singles – Doubles	(Croatia) Marin Čilić*	(United Kingdom) Andy Murray	6–4, 7–5	(Croatia) Ivan Dodig (Brazil) Marcelo Melo	(Netherlands) Jean-Julien Rojer (Romania) Horia Tecau	7–6^{(7–5)}, 6–7^{(5–7)}, [10–6]
Shanghai Singles – Doubles	(United Kingdom) Andy Murray	(Spain) Roberto Bautista Agut	7–6^{(7–1)}, 6–1	(United States) John Isner (United States) Jack Sock	(Finland) Henri Kontinen (Australia) John Peers	6–4, 6–4
Paris Singles – Doubles	(United Kingdom) Andy Murray	(United States) John Isner	6–3, 6–7^{(4–7)}, 6–4	(Finland) Henri Kontinen* (Australia) John Peers*	(France) Pierre-Hugues Herbert (France) Nicolas Mahut	6–4, 3–6, [10–6]

== Tournament details ==
Key

- Q = Qualifier
- WC = Wild card
- LL = Lucky loser
- Alt = Alternate
- ITF = ITF entry
- PR = Protected ranking
- SR = Special ranking
- SE = Special exempt
- JE = Junior exempt
- JR = Junior Accelerator Programme entrant
- CO = College Accelerator Programme entrant
- NG = Next Gen Accelerator Program entrant
- w/o = Walkover
- r = Retired
- d = Defaulted

=== Indian Wells Masters ===
==== Singles ====
Quarterfinals
1	(Serbia) Novak Djokovic	7^{7}	7^{7}
7	(France) Jo-Wilfried Tsonga	6^{2}	6^{2}
4	(Spain) Rafael Nadal	6	6
5	(Japan) Kei Nishikori	4	3
10	(Croatia) Marin Čilić	6^{4}	2
15	(Belgium) David Goffin	7^{7}	6
12	(Canada) Milos Raonic	7	6
13	(France) Gaël Monfils	5	3

Semifinals
1	(Serbia) Novak Djokovic	7^{7}	6
4	(Spain) Rafael Nadal	6^{5}	2
15	(Belgium) David Goffin	3	6	3
12	(Canada) Milos Raonic	6	3	6

Final
1	(Serbia) Novak Djokovic	6	6
12	(Canada) Milos Raonic	2	0

==== Doubles ====
Semifinals
6	(Canada) Vasek Pospisil (United States) Jack Sock	4	6	[12]
(Spain) Feliciano López (Spain) Marc López	6	3	[10]
8	(France) Édouard Roger-Vasselin (Serbia) Nenad Zimonjić	6	3	[6]
7	(France) Pierre-Hugues Herbert (France) Nicolas Mahut	4	6	[10]

Final
6	(Canada) Vasek Pospisil (United States) Jack Sock	3	6^{5}
7	(France) Pierre-Hugues Herbert (France) Nicolas Mahut	6	7^{7}

=== Miami Open ===
==== Singles ====
Quarterfinals
1	(Serbia) Novak Djokovic	6	6
7	(Czech Republic) Tomas Berdych	3	3
15	(Belgium) David Goffin	3	6	6
18	(France) Gilles Simon	6	2	1
12	(Canada) Milos Raonic	4	6^{4}
24	(Australia) Nick Kyrgios	6	7
6	(Japan) Kei Nishikori	4	6	7
16	(France) Gaël Monfils	6	3	6^{3}

Semifinals
1	(Serbia) Novak Djokovic	7	6
15	(Belgium) David Goffin	6^{4}	4
24	(Australia) Nick Kyrgios	3	5
6	(Japan) Kei Nishikori	6	7

Final
1	(Serbia) Novak Djokovic	6	6
6	(Japan) Kei Nishikori	3	3

==== Doubles ====
Semifinals
5	(France) Pierre-Hugues Herbert (France) Nicolas Mahut	6	6
4	(United States) Bob Bryan (United States) Mike Bryan	3	3
(South Africa) Raven Klaasen (United States) Rajeev Ram	6	6
(Philippines) Treat Huey (Belarus) Max Mirnyi	4	2

Final
5	(France) Pierre-Hugues Herbert (France) Nicolas Mahut	5	6	[10]
(South Africa) Raven Klaasen (United States) Rajeev Ram	7	1	[7]

=== Monte-Carlo Masters ===
==== Singles ====
Quarterfinals
13	(France) Gaël Monfils	6	6
LL	(Spain) Marcel Granollers	2	4
3	(Switzerland) Roger Federer	6	2	5
8	(France) Jo-Wilfried Tsonga	3	6	7
5	(Spain) Rafael Nadal	6	6
4	(Switzerland) Stan Wawrinka	1	4
10	(Canada) Milos Raonic	2	0
2	(United Kingdom) Andy Murray	6	6

Semifinals
13	(France) Gaël Monfils	6	6
8	(France) Jo-Wilfried Tsonga	1	3
5	(Spain) Rafael Nadal	2	6	6
2	(United Kingdom) Andy Murray	6	4	2

Final
13	(France) Gaël Monfils	5	7	0
5	(Spain) Rafael Nadal	7	5	6

==== Doubles ====
Semifinals
(Colombia) Juan Sebastián Cabal (Colombia) Robert Farah	6^{7}	4
3	(France) Pierre-Hugues Herbert (France) Nicolas Mahut	7^{9}	6
4	(United Kingdom) Jamie Murray (Brazil) Bruno Soares	6	6
2	(Croatia) Ivan Dodig (Brazil) Marcelo Melo	2	4

Final
3	(France) Pierre-Hugues Herbert (France) Nicolas Mahut	4	6	[10]
4	(United Kingdom) Jamie Murray (Brazil) Bruno Soares	6	0	[6]

=== Madrid Open ===
==== Singles ====
Quarterfinals
1	(Serbia) Novak Djokovic	6	6
11	(Canada) Milos Raonic	3	4
(Australia) Nick Kyrgios	7^{8}	6^{1}	3
6	(Japan) Kei Nishikori	6^{6}	7^{7}	6
5	(Spain) Rafael Nadal	6	4	6
(Portugal) João Sousa	0	6	3
8	(Czech Republic) Tomáš Berdych	3	2
2	(United Kingdom) Andy Murray	6	6

Semifinals
1	(Serbia) Novak Djokovic	6	7^{7}
6	(Japan) Kei Nishikori	3	6^{4}
5	(Spain) Rafael Nadal	5	4
2	(United Kingdom) Andy Murray	7	6

Final
1	(Serbia) Novak Djokovic	6	3	6
2	(United Kingdom) Andy Murray	2	6	3

==== Doubles ====
Semifinals
1	(France) Pierre-Hugues Herbert (France) Nicolas Mahut	2	6^{3}
3	(Netherlands) Jean-Julien Rojer (Romania) Horia Tecău	6	7^{7}
4	(Croatia) Ivan Dodig (Brazil) Marcelo Melo	5	7^{7}	[10]
6	(India) Rohan Bopanna (Romania) Florin Mergea	7	6^{4}	[12]

Final
3	(Netherlands) Jean-Julien Rojer (Romania) Horia Tecău	6	7^{7}
6	(India) Rohan Bopanna (Romania) Florin Mergea	4	6^{5}

=== Italian Open ===
==== Singles ====
Quarterfinals
1	(Serbia) Novak Djokovic	7	7^{7}
5	(Spain) Rafael Nadal	5	6^{4}
13	(Austria) Dominic Thiem	3	5
6	(Japan) Kei Nishikori	6	7
LL	(France) Lucas Pouille	w/o
PR	(Argentina) Juan Mónaco
12	(Belgium) David Goffin	1	5
2	(United Kingdom) Andy Murray	6	7

Semifinals
1	(Serbia) Novak Djokovic	2	6	7^{7}
6	(Japan) Kei Nishikori	6	4	6^{5}
LL	(France) Lucas Pouille	2	1
2	(United Kingdom) Andy Murray	6	6

Final
1	(Serbia) Novak Djokovic	3	3
2	(United Kingdom) Andy Murray	6	6

==== Doubles ====
Semifinals
PR	(France) Julien Benneteau (France) Édouard Roger-Vasselin	7^{7}	2	[7]
5	(United States) Bob Bryan (United States) Mike Bryan	6^{5}	6	[10]
8	(Canada) Vasek Pospisil (United States) Jack Sock	7^{7}	7^{7}
6	(India) Rohan Bopanna (Romania) Florin Mergea	6^{4}	6^{2}

Final
5	(United States) Bob Bryan (United States) Mike Bryan	2	6	[10]
8	(Canada) Vasek Pospisil (United States) Jack Sock	6	3	[7]

=== Toronto Masters ===
==== Singles ====
Quarterfinals
1	(Serbia) Novak Djokovic	7^{8}	6
5	(Czech Republic) Tomáš Berdych	6^{6}	4
4	(Canada) Milos Raonic	4	4
10	(France) Gaël Monfils	6	6
(Bulgaria) Grigor Dimitrov	3	6	2
3	(Japan) Kei Nishikori	6	3	6
(South Africa) Kevin Anderson	1	3
2	(Switzerland) Stan Wawrinka	6	6

Semifinals
1	(Serbia) Novak Djokovic	6	6
10	(France) Gaël Monfils	3	2
3	(Japan) Kei Nishikori	7^{8}	6
2	(Switzerland) Stan Wawrinka	6^{6}	1

Final
1	(Serbia) Novak Djokovic	6	7
3	(Japan) Kei Nishikori	3	5

==== Doubles ====
Semifinals
5	(Romania) Florin Mergea (Romania) Horia Tecău	4	3
3	(Croatia) Ivan Dodig (Brazil) Marcelo Melo	6	6
6	(Canada) Daniel Nestor (Canada) Vasek Pospisil	4	7^{7}	[7]
2	(United Kingdom) Jamie Murray (Brazil) Bruno Soares	6	6^{5}	[10]

Final
3	(Croatia) Ivan Dodig (Brazil) Marcelo Melo	6	6
2	(United Kingdom) Jamie Murray (Brazil) Bruno Soares	4	4

=== Cincinnati Masters ===
==== Singles ====
Quarterfinals
1	(United Kingdom) Andy Murray	6	6
(Australia) Bernard Tomic	4	4
4	(Canada) Milos Raonic	6	6
8	(Austria) Dominic Thiem	3	4
12	(Croatia) Marin Čilić	6	0
(Croatia) Borna Ćorić	2	0^{r}
(United States) Steve Johnson	6^{8}	2
(Bulgaria) Grigor Dimitrov	7^{10}	6

Semifinals
1	(United Kingdom) Andy Murray	6	6
4	(Canada) Milos Raonic	3	3
12	(Croatia) Marin Čilić	4	6	7
(Bulgaria) Grigor Dimitrov	6	3	5

Final
1	(United Kingdom) Andy Murray	4	5
12	(Croatia) Marin Čilić	6	7

==== Doubles ====
Semifinals
6	(Canada) Daniel Nestor (Canada) Vasek Pospisil	4	1
4	(Croatia) Ivan Dodig (Brazil) Marcelo Melo	6	6
5	(Netherlands) Jean-Julien Rojer (Romania) Horia Tecău	6	7^{7}
2	(United States) Bob Bryan (United States) Mike Bryan	3	6^{5}

Final
4	(Croatia) Ivan Dodig (Brazil) Marcelo Melo	7^{7}	6^{5}	[10]
5	(Netherlands) Jean-Julien Rojer (Romania) Horia Tecău	6^{5}	7^{7}	[6]

=== Shanghai Masters ===
==== Singles ====
Quarterfinals
1	(Serbia) Novak Djokovic	3	7^{7}	6
Q	(Germany) Mischa Zverev	6	6^{4}	3
15	(Spain) Roberto Bautista Agut	6	6
9	(France) Jo-Wilfried Tsonga	3	4
(United States) Jack Sock	6	4	6^{5}
(France) Gilles Simon	4	6	7^{7}
11	(Belgium) David Goffin	2	2
2	(United Kingdom) Andy Murray	6	6

Semifinals
1	(Serbia) Novak Djokovic	4	4
15	(Spain) Roberto Bautista Agut	6	6
(France) Gilles Simon	4	3
2	(United Kingdom) Andy Murray	6	6

Final
15	(Spain) Roberto Bautista Agut	6^{1}	1
2	(United Kingdom) Andy Murray	7^{7}	6

==== Doubles ====
Semifinals
(Finland) Henri Kontinen (Australia) John Peers	6	6
(Croatia) Marin Čilić (Croatia) Mate Pavić	3	4
(United States) John Isner (United States) Jack Sock	6	7^{7}
2	(United States) Bob Bryan (United States) Mike Bryan	2	6^{2}

Final
(Finland) Henri Kontinen (Australia) John Peers	4	4
(United States) John Isner (United States) Jack Sock	6	6

=== Paris Masters ===
==== Singles ====
Quarterfinals
1	(Serbia) Novak Djokovic	4	6^{2}
9	(Croatia) Marin Čilić	6	7^{7}
(United States) John Isner	7^{8}	4	6
(United States) Jack Sock	6^{6}	6	4
11	(France) Jo-Wilfried Tsonga	2	6^{4}
4	(Canada) Milos Raonic	6	7^{7}
7	(Czech Republic) Tomáš Berdych	6^{9}	5
2	(United Kingdom) Andy Murray	7^{11}	7

Semifinals
9	(Croatia) Marin Čilić	4	3
(United States) John Isner	6	6
4	(Canada) Milos Raonic
2	(United Kingdom) Andy Murray	w/o

Final
(United States) John Isner	3	7^{7}	4
2	(United Kingdom) Andy Murray	6	6^{4}	6

==== Doubles ====
Semifinals
1	(France) Pierre-Hugues Herbert (France) Nicolas Mahut	6	3	[10]
8	(India) Rohan Bopanna (Canada) Daniel Nestor	4	6	[6]
(Finland) Henri Kontinen (Australia) John Peers	6	6
6	(Brazil) Marcelo Melo (Canada) Vasek Pospisil	4	4

Final
1	(France) Pierre-Hugues Herbert (France) Nicolas Mahut	4	6	[6]
(Finland) Henri Kontinen (Australia) John Peers	6	3	[10]

== See also ==
- ATP Tour Masters 1000
- 2016 ATP Tour
- 2016 WTA Premier Mandatory and Premier 5 tournaments
- 2016 WTA Tour
