= 2016 WTA Premier Mandatory and Premier 5 tournaments =

Women's professional tennis tour

2016 Premier Mandatory / Premier 5
Details
- Duration: February 22 – October 9
- Edition: 27th
- Tournaments: 9

Achievements (singles)
- Most titles: (Belarus) Victoria Azarenka (Romania) Simona Halep (2)
- Most finals: (Belarus) Victoria Azarenka (Slovakia) Dominika Cibulková (Romania) Simona Halep (United States) Madison Keys (United States) Serena Williams (2)

The WTA Premier Mandatory and Premier 5 tournaments, which are part of the WTA Premier tournaments, make up the elite tour for professional women's tennis organised by the WTA called the WTA Tour. There are four Premier Mandatory tournaments: Indian Wells, Miami, Madrid and Beijing and five Premier 5 tournaments: Doha, Rome, Canada, Cincinnati and Wuhan.

== Tournaments ==
Tournament	Country	Location	Surface	Date	Prize money
Qatar Open	Qatar	Doha	Hard	Feb 22 – 28	$2,818,000
Indian Wells Open	United States	Indian Wells	Hard	Mar 7 – 20	$6,844,139
Miami Open	United States	Key Biscayne	Hard	Mar 21 – Apr 3	$6,844,139
Madrid Open	Spain	Madrid	Clay (red)	May 1 – 7	€5,300,951
Italian Open	Italy	Rome	Clay (red)	May 9 – 15	€2,900,360
Canadian Open	Canada	Montreal	Hard	July 25 – 31	$2,714,413
Cincinnati Open	United States	Mason	Hard	Aug 15 – 21	$2,804,000
Wuhan Open	China	Wuhan	Hard	Sep 26 – Oct 2	$2,589,000
China Open	China	Beijing	Hard	Oct 3 – 9	$6,289,521

== Results ==
* First-time champion

Tournament	Singles champions	Runners-up	Score	Doubles champions	Runners-up	Score
Doha Singles – Doubles	(Spain) Carla Suárez Navarro*	(Latvia) Jeļena Ostapenko	1–6, 6–4, 6–4	(Chinese Taipei) Chan Hao-ching (Chinese Taipei) Chan Latisha	(Italy) Sara Errani (Spain) Carla Suárez Navarro	6–3, 6–3
Indian Wells Singles – Doubles	(Belarus) Victoria Azarenka	(United States) Serena Williams	6–4, 6–4	(United States) Bethanie Mattek-Sands	(Germany) Julia Görges (Czech Republic) Karolína Plíšková	4–6, 6–4, [10–6]
Indian Wells Singles – Doubles	(Belarus) Victoria Azarenka	(United States) Serena Williams	6–4, 6–4	(United States) CoCo Vandeweghe*	(Germany) Julia Görges (Czech Republic) Karolína Plíšková	4–6, 6–4, [10–6]
Miami Singles – Doubles	(Belarus) Victoria Azarenka (2)	(Russia) Svetlana Kuznetsova	6–3, 6–2	(United States) Bethanie Mattek-Sands (2) (Czech Republic) Lucie Šafářová	(Hungary) Tímea Babos (Kazakhstan) Yaroslava Shvedova	6–3, 6–4
Madrid Singles – Doubles	(Romania) Simona Halep	(Slovakia) Dominika Cibulková	6–4, 6–2	(France) Caroline Garcia*	(Switzerland) Martina Hingis (India) Sania Mirza	6–4, 6–4
Madrid Singles – Doubles	(Romania) Simona Halep	(Slovakia) Dominika Cibulková	6–4, 6–2	(France) Kristina Mladenovic	(Switzerland) Martina Hingis (India) Sania Mirza	6–4, 6–4
Rome Singles – Doubles	(United States) Serena Williams	(United States) Madison Keys	7–6^{(7–5)}, 6–3	(Switzerland) Martina Hingis (India) Sania Mirza	(Russia) Ekaterina Makarova (Russia) Elena Vesnina	6–1, 6–7^{(5–7)}, [10–3]
Montréal Singles – Doubles	(Romania) Simona Halep (2)	(United States) Madison Keys	7–6^{(7–2)}, 6–3	(Russia) Ekaterina Makarova (Russia) Elena Vesnina	(Romania) Simona Halep (Romania) Monica Niculescu	6–3, 7–6^{(7–5)}
Cincinnati Singles – Doubles	(Czech Republic) Karolína Plíšková*	(Germany) Angelique Kerber	6–3, 6–1	(India) Sania Mirza (Czech Republic) Barbora Strýcová	(Switzerland) Martina Hingis (United States) CoCo Vandeweghe	7–5, 6–4
Wuhan Singles – Doubles	(Czech Republic) Petra Kvitová	(Slovakia) Dominika Cibulková	6–1, 6–1	(United States) Bethanie Mattek-Sands (3) (Czech Republic) Lucie Šafářová (2)	(India) Sania Mirza (Czech Republic) Barbora Strýcová	6–1, 6–4
Beijing Singles – Doubles	(Poland) Agnieszka Radwańska	(United Kingdom) Johanna Konta	6–4, 6–2	(United States) Bethanie Mattek-Sands (4) (Czech Republic) Lucie Šafářová (3)	(France) Caroline Garcia (France) Kristina Mladenovic	6–4, 6–4

== See also ==
- WTA Premier tournaments
- 2016 WTA Tour
- 2016 ATP Masters 1000
- 2016 ATP Tour
