= 2016 Miami Open – Women's doubles =

Women's doubles
- 2016 Miami Open

Final
- Champions: (United States) Bethanie Mattek-Sands (Czech Republic) Lucie Šafářová
- Runners-up: (Hungary) Tímea Babos (Kazakhstan) Yaroslava Shvedova
- Score: 6–3, 6–4

Details
- Draw: 32
- Seeds: 8

Events
Singles	men	women
Doubles	men	women
- Miami Open

Former tenis players, Martina Hingis of Switzerland and Sania Mirza of India were the defending champions, but lost in the second round to Margarita Gasparyan and Monica Niculescu.
Bethanie Mattek-Sands and Lucie Šafářová won the title, defeating Tímea Babos and Yaroslava Shvedova in the final, 6–3, 6–4.

== Seeds ==
1. (Switzerland) Martina Hingis / (India) Sania Mirza (second round)
2. (Chinese Taipei) Chan Hao-ching / (Chinese Taipei) Chan Yung-jan (first round)
3. (United States) Bethanie Mattek-Sands / (Czech Republic) Lucie Šafářová (champions)
4. (Hungary) Tímea Babos / (Kazakhstan) Yaroslava Shvedova (final)
5. (Czech Republic) Andrea Hlaváčková / (Czech Republic) Lucie Hradecká (quarterfinals)
6. (France) Caroline Garcia / (France) Kristina Mladenovic (first round)
7. (Slovenia) Andreja Klepač / (Slovenia) Katarina Srebotnik (first round)
8. (China) Xu Yifan / (China) Zheng Saisai (semifinals)

== Draw ==
Key

- Q = Qualifier
- WC = Wild card
- LL = Lucky loser
- Alt = Alternate
- ITF = ITF entry
- PR = Protected ranking
- SR = Special ranking
- SE = Special exempt
- JE = Junior exempt
- JR = Junior Accelerator Programme entrant
- CO = College Accelerator Programme entrant
- NG = Next Gen Accelerator Program entrant
- w/o = Walkover
- r = Retired
- d = Defaulted

=== Finals ===
Semifinals
(Russia) Margarita Gasparyan (Romania) Monica Niculescu	5	6	[8]
4	(Hungary) Tímea Babos (Kazakhstan) Yaroslava Shvedova	7	4	[10]
3	(United States) Bethanie Mattek-Sands (Czech Republic) Lucie Šafářová	6	6
8	(China) Xu Yifan (China) Zheng Saisai	2	1

Final
4	(Hungary) Tímea Babos (Kazakhstan) Yaroslava Shvedova	3	4
3	(United States) Bethanie Mattek-Sands (Czech Republic) Lucie Šafářová	6	6

=== Top half ===
First round
1	(Switzerland) M Hingis (India) S Mirza	6	6
(Spain) L Arruabarrena (Romania) R Olaru	0	4
(Russia) M Gasparyan (Romania) M Niculescu	6	2	[10]
WC	(Puerto Rico) M Puig (United Kingdom) H Watson	1	6	[5]
(United States) V King (Russia) A Kudryavtseva	4	6	[10]
(Germany) J Görges (Czech Republic) Ka Plíšková	6	3	[8]
(Australia) An Rodionova (Kazakhstan) G Voskoboeva	6	6^{4}	[10]
7	(Slovenia) A Klepač (Slovenia) K Srebotnik	3	7^{7}	[2]
4	(Hungary) T Babos (Kazakhstan) Y Shvedova	6	5	[10]
(Croatia) D Jurak (Poland) K Jans-Ignacik	3	7	[5]
(Netherlands) K Bertens (Sweden) J Larsson	6	6^{5}	[7]
(Australia) C Dellacqua (Australia) S Stosur	3	7^{7}	[10]
(Canada) G Dabrowski (Ukraine) L Kichenok	2	5
(Poland) A Rosolska (Germany) L Siegemund	6	7
(Ukraine) K Bondarenko (Ukraine) O Savchuk	6	6^{6}	[10]
6	(France) C Garcia (France) K Mladenovic	3	7^{8}	[5]

Second round
1	(Switzerland) M Hingis (India) S Mirza	4	2
(Russia) M Gasparyan (Romania) M Niculescu	6	6
(United States) V King (Russia) A Kudryavtseva	6	7^{7}
(Australia) An Rodionova (Kazakhstan) G Voskoboeva	0	6^{1}
4	(Hungary) T Babos (Kazakhstan) Y Shvedova	7	6
(Australia) C Dellacqua (Australia) S Stosur	5	4
(Poland) A Rosolska (Germany) L Siegemund	6^{4}	6	[5]
(Ukraine) K Bondarenko (Ukraine) O Savchuk	7^{7}	2	[10]

Quarterfinals
(Russia) M Gasparyan (Romania) M Niculescu	6	7^{7}
(United States) V King (Russia) A Kudryavtseva	3	6^{3}
4	(Hungary) T Babos (Kazakhstan) Y Shvedova	6	6
(Ukraine) K Bondarenko (Ukraine) O Savchuk	2	4

Semifinals
(Russia) M Gasparyan (Romania) M Niculescu	5	6	[8]
4	(Hungary) T Babos (Kazakhstan) Y Shvedova	7	4	[10]

=== Bottom half ===
First round
5	(Czech Republic) A Hlaváčková (Czech Republic) L Hradecká	6	6
(United States) A Spears (United States) N Melichar	4	1
Alt	(Switzerland) B Bencic (Liechtenstein) S Vogt	1	2
(Italy) S Errani (Spain) C Suárez Navarro	6	6
(Russia) D Kasatkina (Russia) E Vesnina	6	6
(Chinese Taipei) C-j Chuang (China) C Liang	2	3
WC	(United States) M Keys (United States) S Stephens	4	2
3	(United States) B Mattek-Sands (Czech Republic) L Šafářová	6	6
8	(China) Y Xu (China) S Zheng	2	6	[12]
WC	(Russia) S Kuznetsova (Russia) A Pavlyuchenkova	6	3	[10]
(Hungary) K Marosi (Czech Republic) K Siniaková	2	4
(Spain) A Medina Garrigues (Spain) A Parra Santonja	6	6
(Germany) A-L Grönefeld (United States) C Vandeweghe	4	2
(Chinese Taipei) S-w Hsieh (China) S Peng	6	6
(Russia) E Makarova (Czech Republic) B Strýcová	7^{7}	6
2	(Chinese Taipei) H-c Chan (Chinese Taipei) Y-j Chan	6^{2}	4

Second round
5	(Czech Republic) A Hlaváčková (Czech Republic) L Hradecká	6	6
(Italy) S Errani (Spain) C Suárez Navarro	4	3
(Russia) D Kasatkina (Russia) E Vesnina	2	3
3	(United States) B Mattek-Sands (Czech Republic) L Šafářová	6	6
8	(China) Y Xu (China) S Zheng	3	6	[10]
(Spain) A Medina Garrigues (Spain) A Parra Santonja	6	3	[4]
(Chinese Taipei) S-w Hsieh (China) S Peng	7	2	[6]
(Russia) E Makarova (Czech Republic) B Strýcová	5	6	[10]

Quarterfinals
5	(Czech Republic) A Hlaváčková (Czech Republic) L Hradecká	5	3
3	(United States) B Mattek-Sands (Czech Republic) L Šafářová	7	6
8	(China) Y Xu (China) S Zheng	6	6
(Russia) E Makarova (Czech Republic) B Strýcová	2	2

Semifinals
3	(United States) B Mattek-Sands (Czech Republic) L Šafářová	6	6
8	(China) Y Xu (China) S Zheng	2	1
