= 2016 Miami Open – Women's singles =

Women's singles
- 2016 Miami Open

Final
- Champion: (Belarus) Victoria Azarenka
- Runner-up: (Russia) Svetlana Kuznetsova
- Score: 6–3, 6–2

Details
- Draw: 96
- Seeds: 32

Events
Singles	men	women
Doubles	men	women
- Miami Open

Victoria Azarenka defeated Svetlana Kuznetsova in the final, 6–3, 6–2 to win the women's singles tennis title at the 2016 Miami Open. She became the first woman since Kim Clijsters in 2005 to win Indian Wells and Miami back to back, and became only the third woman in history, after Steffi Graf and Clijsters, to complete the 'Sunshine Double' in singles.

Serena Williams was the three-time defending champion, but lost in the fourth round to Kuznetsova.

== Seeds ==
All seeds received a bye into the second round.

1. (United States) Serena Williams (fourth round)
2. (Germany) Angelique Kerber (semifinals)
3. (Poland) Agnieszka Radwańska (fourth round)
4. (Spain) Garbiñe Muguruza (fourth round)
5. (Romania) Simona Halep (quarterfinals)
6. (Spain) Carla Suárez Navarro (second round)
7. (Switzerland) Belinda Bencic (second round, retired)
8. (Czech Republic) Petra Kvitová (third round)
9. (Italy) Roberta Vinci (third round)
10. (United States) Venus Williams (second round)
11. (Czech Republic) Lucie Šafářová (second round)
12. (Ukraine) Elina Svitolina (fourth round)
13. (Belarus) Victoria Azarenka (champion)
14. (Italy) Sara Errani (second round)
15. (Russia) Svetlana Kuznetsova (final)
16. (Serbia) Ana Ivanovic (third round)

17. (Czech Republic) Karolína Plíšková (second round)
18. (Serbia) Jelena Janković (second round, retired)
19. (Switzerland) Timea Bacsinszky (semifinals)
20. (United States) Sloane Stephens (second round)
21. (Germany) Andrea Petkovic (second round)
22. (United States) Madison Keys (quarterfinals)
23. (Denmark) Caroline Wozniacki (third round)
24. (United Kingdom) Johanna Konta (quarterfinals)
25. (Russia) Anastasia Pavlyuchenkova (second round)
26. (Australia) Samantha Stosur (second round)
27. (France) Kristina Mladenovic (second round)
28. (Slovakia) Anna Karolína Schmiedlová (second round)
29. (Germany) Sabine Lisicki (second round)
30. (Russia) Ekaterina Makarova (quarterfinals)
31. (Australia) Daria Gavrilova (second round)
32. (Romania) Monica Niculescu (fourth round)

Click on the seed number of a player to go to their draw section.

== Draw ==
Key

- Q = Qualifier
- WC = Wild card
- LL = Lucky loser
- Alt = Alternate
- ITF = ITF entry
- PR = Protected ranking
- SR = Special ranking
- SE = Special exempt
- JE = Junior exempt
- JR = Junior Accelerator Programme entrant
- CO = College Accelerator Programme entrant
- NG = Next Gen Accelerator Program entrant
- w/o = Walkover
- r = Retired
- d = Defaulted

=== Finals ===
Quarterfinals
15	(Russia) Svetlana Kuznetsova	6^{3}	6	6
30	(Russia) Ekaterina Makarova	7^{7}	4	3
19	(Switzerland) Timea Bacsinszky	4	6	6
5	(Romania) Simona Halep	6	3	2
24	(United Kingdom) Johanna Konta	4	2
13	(Belarus) Victoria Azarenka	6	6
22	(United States) Madison Keys	3	2
2	(Germany) Angelique Kerber	6	6

Semifinals
15	(Russia) Svetlana Kuznetsova	7	6
19	(Switzerland) Timea Bacsinszky	5	3
13	(Belarus) Victoria Azarenka	6	7
2	(Germany) Angelique Kerber	2	5

Final
15	(Russia) Svetlana Kuznetsova	3	2
13	(Belarus) Victoria Azarenka	6	6

=== Top half ===
==== Section 1 ====
First round
(Japan) M Doi	2	6	5
(United States) C McHale	6	4	7
(Belarus) O Govortsova	0	1
(Kazakhstan) Z Diyas	6	6
(Croatia) M Lučić-Baroni	6	1	3
(France) C Garcia	2	6	6
(Germany) C Witthöft	6	4	6
Q	(Belarus) A Sasnovich	2	6	1

Second round
1	(United States) S Williams	6	5	6
(United States) C McHale	3	7	2
(Kazakhstan) Z Diyas	7	6
31	(Australia) D Gavrilova	5	3
21	(Germany) A Petkovic	6^{5}	6	6^{2}
(France) C Garcia	7^{7}	3	7^{7}
(Germany) C Witthöft	3	6	4
15	(Russia) S Kuznetsova	6	4	6

Third round
1	(United States) S Williams	7	6
(Kazakhstan) Z Diyas	5	3
(France) C Garcia	6	2	6^{6}
15	(Russia) S Kuznetsova	4	6	7^{8}

Fourth round
1	(United States) S Williams	7^{7}	1	2
15	(Russia) S Kuznetsova	6^{3}	6	6

==== Section 2 ====
First round
(China) S Zhang	6	6
WC	(Russia) S Zhuk	1	2
PR	(United States) V King	6	6
Q	(Spain) L Domínguez Lino	4	4
(Romania) A Dulgheru	7^{7}	3	3
(Ukraine) L Tsurenko	6^{5}	6	6
Q	(Italy) F Schiavone	5	1
(United States) I Falconi	7	6

Second round
12	(Ukraine) E Svitolina	6	6
(China) S Zhang	3	0
PR	(United States) V King	5	2
23	(Denmark) C Wozniacki	7	6
30	(Russia) E Makarova	3	6	6
(Ukraine) L Tsurenko	6	4	3
(United States) I Falconi	1	4
8	(Czech Republic) P Kvitová	6	6

Third round
12	(Ukraine) E Svitolina	5	6	7^{7}
23	(Denmark) C Wozniacki	7	4	6^{1}
30	(Russia) E Makarova	6	6
8	(Czech Republic) P Kvitová	4	4

Fourth round
12	(Ukraine) E Svitolina	1	4
30	(Russia) E Makarova	6	6

==== Section 3 ====
First round
PR	(Kazakhstan) G Voskoboeva	4	5
(France) A Cornet	6	7
(United States) M Brengle	6	6
(Italy) C Giorgi	4	3
(Russia) M Gasparyan	6	7
(Germany) A Beck	3	5
(Brazil) T Pereira	7^{7}	6
WC	(Brazil) B Haddad Maia	6^{2}	1

Second round
3	(Poland) A Radwańska	6	6
(France) A Cornet	0	1
(United States) M Brengle	7	6
28	(Slovakia) AK Schmiedlová	5	4
19	(Switzerland) T Bacsinszky	6	6
(Russia) M Gasparyan	3	1
(Brazil) T Pereira	3	0
16	(Serbia) A Ivanovic	6	6

Third round
3	(Poland) A Radwańska	6	6
(United States) M Brengle	3	2
19	(Switzerland) T Bacsinszky	7	6
16	(Serbia) A Ivanovic	5	4

Fourth round
3	(Poland) A Radwańska	6	4	2
19	(Switzerland) T Bacsinszky	2	6	6

==== Section 4 ====
First round
(Belgium) Y Wickmayer	6	6
(Italy) K Knapp	2	1
PR	(Czech Republic) P Cetkovská	1	0
WC	(United Kingdom) H Watson	6	6
(Japan) N Hibino	6^{6}	4
(Germany) J Görges	7^{8}	6
(Ukraine) K Bondarenko	2	6	2
(Russia) D Kasatkina	6	1	6

Second round
11	(Czech Republic) L Šafářová	2	3
(Belgium) Y Wickmayer	6	6
WC	(United Kingdom) H Watson	6	6
20	(United States) S Stephens	3	0
26	(Australia) S Stosur	6	1	4
(Germany) J Görges	3	6	6
(Russia) D Kasatkina	3	5
5	(Romania) S Halep	6	7

Third round
(Belgium) Y Wickmayer	6	5	3
WC	(United Kingdom) H Watson	3	7	6
(Germany) J Görges	4	1
5	(Romania) S Halep	6	6

Fourth round
WC	(United Kingdom) H Watson	3	4
5	(Romania) S Halep	6	6

=== Bottom half ===
==== Section 5 ====
First round
Q	(United States) S Crawford	4	5
(United States) C Vandeweghe	6	7
PR	(China) S Peng	6	7
(Belgium) A Van Uytvanck	3	5
(Czech Republic) D Allertová	6^{5}	4
(Montenegro) D Kovinić	7^{7}	6
Q	(Slovakia) J Čepelová	5	3
Q	(Russia) E Vesnina	7	6

Second round
6	(Spain) C Suárez Navarro	4	2
(United States) C Vandeweghe	6	6
PR	(China) S Peng	1	6	0
32	(Romania) M Niculescu	6	3	6
24	(United Kingdom) J Konta	6	6
(Montenegro) D Kovinić	4	2
Q	(Russia) E Vesnina	6	6^{5}	6
10	(United States) V Williams	0	7^{7}	2

Third round
(United States) C Vandeweghe	4	1
32	(Romania) M Niculescu	6	6
24	(United Kingdom) J Konta	4	6	7^{7}
Q	(Russia) E Vesnina	6	1	6^{3}

Fourth round
32	(Romania) M Niculescu	2	2
24	(United Kingdom) J Konta	6	6

==== Section 6 ====
First round
WC	(United States) C Bellis	6	3	2
(Puerto Rico) M Puig	4	6	6
(United States) B Mattek-Sands	4	7^{9}	3
Q	(Poland) M Linette	6	6^{7}	6
(Kazakhstan) Y Putintseva	4	2
WC	(United States) N Gibbs	6	6
(Slovakia) D Cibulková	4	6	6
(Sweden) J Larsson	6	1	2

Second round
13	(Belarus) V Azarenka	6	6
(Puerto Rico) M Puig	2	4
Q	(Poland) M Linette	1
18	(Serbia) J Janković	0^{r}
27	(France) K Mladenovic	2	4
WC	(United States) N Gibbs	6	6
(Slovakia) D Cibulková	7^{7}	3	5
4	(Spain) G Muguruza	6^{3}	6	7

Third round
13	(Belarus) V Azarenka	6	6
Q	(Poland) M Linette	3	0
WC	(United States) N Gibbs	1	0
4	(Spain) G Muguruza	6	6

Fourth round
13	(Belarus) V Azarenka	7^{8}	7^{7}
4	(Spain) G Muguruza	6^{6}	6^{4}

==== Section 7 ====
First round
Q	(Czech Republic) Kr Plíšková	6	6
WC	(Spain) P Badosa Gibert	3	3
Q	(Greece) M Sakkari	1	3
(Romania) I-C Begu	6	6
WC	(United Kingdom) L Robson	6^{4}	2
(Belgium) K Flipkens	7^{7}	6
(Canada) E Bouchard	4	6	2
(Czech Republic) L Hradecká	6	3	6

Second round
7	(Switzerland) B Bencic	1^{r}
Q	(Czech Republic) Kr Plíšková	4
(Romania) I-C Begu	6	1	7^{7}
29	(Germany) S Lisicki	4	6	6^{2}
22	(United States) M Keys	6	6
(Belgium) K Flipkens	4	2
(Czech Republic) L Hradecká	6	4	6^{5}
9	(Italy) R Vinci	1	6	7^{7}

Third round
Q	(Czech Republic) Kr Plíšková	5	6	4
(Romania) I-C Begu	7	4	6
22	(United States) M Keys	6	6
9	(Italy) R Vinci	4	4

Fourth round
(Romania) I-C Begu	3	1
22	(United States) M Keys	6	6

==== Section 8 ====
First round
WC	(Japan) N Osaka	6	2	6
Q	(France) P Parmentier	2	6	2
(Hungary) T Babos	7^{7}	6
Q	(United States) A Tatishvili	6^{2}	2
Q	(Netherlands) K Bertens	6	6
(China) S Zheng	3	2
(Germany) A-L Friedsam	2	0
(Czech Republic) B Strýcová	6	6

Second round
14	(Italy) S Errani	1	3
WC	(Japan) N Osaka	6	6
(Hungary) T Babos	5	6	7^{7}
17	(Czech Republic) Ka Plíšková	7	2	6^{0}
25	(Russia) A Pavlyuchenkova	1	6	1
Q	(Netherlands) K Bertens	6	4	6
(Czech Republic) B Strýcová	1	1
2	(Germany) A Kerber	6	6

Third round
WC	(Japan) N Osaka	5	0
(Hungary) T Babos	7	6
Q	(Netherlands) K Bertens	6	2	0^{r}
2	(Germany) A Kerber	1	6	3

Fourth round
(Hungary) T Babos	2	6	4
2	(Germany) A Kerber	6	3	6

== Qualifying ==
=== Seeds ===
1. (Latvia) Jeļena Ostapenko (first round)
2. (Kazakhstan) Yaroslava Shvedova (qualifying competition)
3. (Estonia) Anett Kontaveit (first round)
4. (Colombia) Mariana Duque Mariño (first round)
5. (Croatia) Ana Konjuh (first round)
6. (United Kingdom) Naomi Broady (qualifying competition)
7. (Spain) Lara Arruabarrena (qualifying competition)
8. (Germany) Laura Siegemund (first round)
9. (Slovenia) Polona Hercog (first round, retired)
10. (Russia) Elena Vesnina (qualified)
11. (Japan) Kurumi Nara (first round)
12. (Germany) Tatjana Maria (qualifying competition)
13. (United States) Alison Riske (first round)
14. (Latvia) Anastasija Sevastova (first round)
15. (Croatia) Donna Vekić (qualifying competition)
16. (United States) Lauren Davis (first round)
17. (Italy) Francesca Schiavone (qualified)
18. (Belarus) Aliaksandra Sasnovich (qualified)
19. (Czech Republic) Kristýna Plíšková (qualified)
20. (Russia) Evgeniya Rodina (first round)
21. (Bulgaria) Tsvetana Pironkova (qualifying competition)
22. (United States) Shelby Rogers (first round)
23. (Spain) Lourdes Domínguez Lino (qualified)
24. (Poland) Magda Linette (qualified)

=== Qualifiers ===
1. (Spain) Lourdes Domínguez Lino
2. (Czech Republic) Kristýna Plíšková
3. (Greece) Maria Sakkari
4. (United States) Samantha Crawford
5. (Netherlands) Kiki Bertens
6. (Belarus) Aliaksandra Sasnovich
7. (Slovakia) Jana Čepelová
8. (United States) Anna Tatishvili
9. (France) Pauline Parmentier
10. (Russia) Elena Vesnina
11. (Italy) Francesca Schiavone
12. (Poland) Magda Linette

=== Qualifying draw ===
==== First qualifier ====
First round
1	(Latvia) Jeļena Ostapenko	5	2
WC	(United States) Sachia Vickery	7	6
(Switzerland) Stefanie Vögele	2	5
23	(Spain) Lourdes Domínguez Lino	6	7

Qualifying competition
WC	(United States) Sachia Vickery	2	4
23	(Spain) Lourdes Domínguez Lino	6	6

==== Second qualifier ====
First round
2	(Kazakhstan) Yaroslava Shvedova	6	6
(Romania) Patricia Maria Țig	3	3
(Czech Republic) Kateřina Siniaková	2	4
19	(Czech Republic) Kristýna Plíšková	6	6

Qualifying competition
2	(Kazakhstan) Yaroslava Shvedova	3	3
19	(Czech Republic) Kristýna Plíšková	6	6

==== Third qualifier ====
First round
3	(Estonia) Anett Kontaveit	3	1
(Greece) Maria Sakkari	6	6
(Serbia) Aleksandra Krunić	6	6
14	(Latvia) Anastasija Sevastova	4	3

Qualifying competition
(Greece) Maria Sakkari	7^{7}	6
(Serbia) Aleksandra Krunić	6^{3}	1

==== Fourth qualifier ====
First round
4	(Colombia) Mariana Duque Mariño	6	4	4
(United States) Samantha Crawford	0	6	6
WC	(United Kingdom) Katie Swan	1	6	6
16	(United States) Lauren Davis	6	4	2

Qualifying competition
(United States) Samantha Crawford	6	4	6
WC	(United Kingdom) Katie Swan	2	6	2

==== Fifth qualifier ====
First round
5	(Croatia) Ana Konjuh	2	3
(Netherlands) Kiki Bertens	6	6
WC	(United States) Claire Liu	7	1	0
15	(Croatia) Donna Vekić	5	6	6

Qualifying competition
(Netherlands) Kiki Bertens	6	7
15	(Croatia) Donna Vekić	3	5

==== Sixth qualifier ====
First round
6	(United Kingdom) Naomi Broady	6	6
(Turkey) Çağla Büyükakçay	4	3
WC	(Netherlands) Indy de Vroome	6^{2}	6^{8}
18	(Belarus) Aliaksandra Sasnovich	7^{7}	7^{10}

Qualifying competition
6	(United Kingdom) Naomi Broady	4	2
18	(Belarus) Aliaksandra Sasnovich	6	6

==== Seventh qualifier ====
First round
7	(Spain) Lara Arruabarrena	6	6
(Israel) Julia Glushko	2	2
(Slovakia) Jana Čepelová	7	6
20	(Russia) Evgeniya Rodina	5	4

Qualifying competition
7	(Spain) Lara Arruabarrena	2	2
(Slovakia) Jana Čepelová	6	6

==== Eighth qualifier ====
First round
8	(Germany) Laura Siegemund	5	2
(United States) Anna Tatishvili	7	6
(Bulgaria) Sesil Karatantcheva	6	6
22	(United States) Shelby Rogers	3	4

Qualifying competition
(United States) Anna Tatishvili	6	6
(Bulgaria) Sesil Karatantcheva	2	2

==== Ninth qualifier ====
First round
9	(Slovenia) Polona Hercog	3	0^{r}
WC	(Hungary) Fanny Stollár	6	3
(France) Pauline Parmentier	2	7	7^{7}
13	(United States) Alison Riske	6	5	6^{4}

Qualifying competition
WC	(Hungary) Fanny Stollár	7^{7}	2	4
(France) Pauline Parmentier	6^{5}	6	6

==== Tenth qualifier ====
First round
10	(Russia) Elena Vesnina	6	6
(Ukraine) Kateryna Kozlova	3	1
(United States) Louisa Chirico	4	2
21	(Bulgaria) Tsvetana Pironkova	6	6

Qualifying competition
10	(Russia) Elena Vesnina	6	6
21	(Bulgaria) Tsvetana Pironkova	2	1

==== Eleventh qualifier ====
First round
11	(Japan) Kurumi Nara	5	5
WC	(Romania) Sorana Cîrstea	7	7
(China) Han Xinyun	7	0	2
17	(Italy) Francesca Schiavone	5	6	6

Qualifying competition
WC	(Romania) Sorana Cîrstea	2	4
17	(Italy) Francesca Schiavone	6	6

==== Twelfth qualifier ====
First round
12	(Germany) Tatjana Maria	6	6
(China) Duan Yingying	1	3
(Austria) Tamira Paszek	4	2
24	(Poland) Magda Linette	6	6

Qualifying competition
12	(Germany) Tatjana Maria	6^{4}	3
24	(Poland) Magda Linette	7^{7}	6
