= 2016 Miami Open – Men's singles =

Men's singles
- 2016 Miami Open

Final
- Champion: (Serbia) Novak Djokovic
- Runner-up: (Japan) Kei Nishikori
- Score: 6–3, 6–3

Details
- Draw: 96 (12 Q / 5 WC )
- Seeds: 32

Events
Singles	men	women
Doubles	men	women
- Miami Open

Two-time defending champion Novak Djokovic defeated Kei Nishikori in the final, 6–3, 6–3 to win the men's singles tennis title at the 2016 Miami Open. Djokovic completed his record fourth Sunshine Double with the win, and won his record-equaling sixth Miami Open title (tied with Andre Agassi). It was also his third consecutive Sunshine Double. He did not lose a single set in the entire tournament.

For the first time in tournament history, no Americans reached the last-of-16 stage.

== Seeds ==
All seeds receive a bye into the second round.

1. (Serbia) Novak Djokovic (champion)
2. (United Kingdom) Andy Murray (third round)
3. (Switzerland) ~~Roger Federer~~ (withdrew because of stomach virus)
4. (Switzerland) Stan Wawrinka (second round)
5. (Spain) Rafael Nadal (second round, retired due to illness)
6. (Japan) Kei Nishikori (final)
7. (Czech Republic) Tomáš Berdych (quarterfinals)
8. (Spain) David Ferrer (third round)
9. (France) Jo-Wilfried Tsonga (third round)
10. (France) Richard Gasquet (fourth round)
11. (Croatia) Marin Čilić (third round)
12. (Canada) Milos Raonic (quarterfinals)
13. (United States) John Isner (second round)
14. (Austria) Dominic Thiem (fourth round)
15. (Belgium) David Goffin (semifinals)
16. (France) Gaël Monfils (quarterfinals)
17. (Spain) Roberto Bautista Agut (fourth round)
18. (France) Gilles Simon (quarterfinals)
19. (Serbia) Viktor Troicki (third round)
20. (France) Benoît Paire (third round)
21. (Spain) Feliciano López (second round)
22. (United States) Jack Sock (third round)
23. (Uruguay) Pablo Cuevas (third round)
24. (Australia) Nick Kyrgios (semifinals)
25. (Slovakia) ~~Martin Kližan~~ (withdrew)
26. (Bulgaria) Grigor Dimitrov (fourth round)
27. (Ukraine) Alexandr Dolgopolov (third round)
28. (France) Jérémy Chardy (second round)
29. (United States) Sam Querrey (second round)
30. (Brazil) Thomaz Bellucci (second round, retired)
31. (United States) Steve Johnson (third round)
32. (Spain) Guillermo García López (second round)
33. (Portugal) João Sousa (third round)

Click on the seed number of a player to go to their draw section.

== Draw ==
Key

- Q = Qualifier
- WC = Wild card
- LL = Lucky loser
- Alt = Alternate
- ITF = ITF entry
- PR = Protected ranking
- SR = Special ranking
- SE = Special exempt
- JE = Junior exempt
- JR = Junior Accelerator Programme entrant
- CO = College Accelerator Programme entrant
- NG = Next Gen Accelerator Program entrant
- w/o = Walkover
- r = Retired
- d = Defaulted

=== Finals ===
Quarterfinals
1	(Serbia) Novak Djokovic	6	6
7	(Czech Republic) Tomáš Berdych	3	3
15	(Belgium) David Goffin	3	6	6
18	(France) Gilles Simon	6	2	1
12	(Canada) Milos Raonic	4	6^{4}
24	(Australia) Nick Kyrgios	6	7^{7}
6	(Japan) Kei Nishikori	4	6	7^{7}
16	(France) Gaël Monfils	6	3	6^{3}

Semifinals
1	(Serbia) Novak Djokovic	7^{7}	6
15	(Belgium) David Goffin	6^{5}	4
24	(Australia) Nick Kyrgios	3	5
6	(Japan) Kei Nishikori	6	7

Final
1	(Serbia) Novak Djokovic	6	6
6	(Japan) Kei Nishikori	3	3

=== Top half ===
==== Section 1 ====
First round
(United Kingdom) K Edmund	6	5	7^{8}
(Czech Republic) J Veselý	4	7	6^{6}
(Argentina) D Schwartzman	6	3	6^{4}
(Canada) V Pospisil	2	6	7^{7}
Q	(Japan) Y Nishioka	6	6
LL	(United States) J Donaldson	3	4
(Dominican Republic) V Estrella Burgos	3	2
(Australia) S Groth	6	6

Second round
1	(Serbia) N Djokovic	6	6
(United Kingdom) K Edmund	3	3
(Canada) V Pospisil	7^{7}	6^{5}	2
33	(Portugal) J Sousa	6^{1}	7^{7}	6
21	(Spain) F López	4	4
Q	(Japan) Y Nishioka	6	6
(Australia) S Groth	5	2
14	(Austria) D Thiem	7	6

Third round
1	(Serbia) N Djokovic	6	6
33	(Portugal) J Sousa	4	1
Q	(Japan) Y Nishioka	2	2
14	(Austria) D Thiem	6	6

Fourth round
1	(Serbia) N Djokovic	6	6
14	(Austria) D Thiem	3	4

==== Section 2 ====
First round
Q	(Colombia) A González	7	2	6^{3}
(Spain) A Ramos Viñolas	5	6	7^{7}
(Russia) M Youzhny	6	6
(Latvia) E Gulbis	4	2
WC	(United States) M Mmoh	6^{3}	6^{4}
(Germany) A Zverev	7^{7}	7^{7}
(United States) R Ram	7	7^{9}
(Russia) E Donskoy	5	6^{7}

Second round
10	(France) R Gasquet	6	6
(Spain) A Ramos Viñolas	4	4
(Russia) M Youzhny	3	4
20	(France) B Paire	6	6
31	(United States) S Johnson	7^{11}	7^{7}
(Germany) A Zverev	6^{9}	6^{3}
(United States) R Ram
7	(Czech Republic) T Berdych	w/o

Third round
10	(France) R Gasquet	6	6
20	(France) B Paire	3	0
31	(United States) S Johnson	3	7^{8}	3
7	(Czech Republic) T Berdych	6	6^{6}	6

Fourth round
10	(France) R Gasquet	4	6	5
7	(Czech Republic) T Berdych	6	3	7

==== Section 3 ====
First round
PR	(Argentina) JM del Potro	6	7^{7}
(Argentina) G Pella	0	6^{4}
(Spain) F Verdasco	7^{7}	6
(Luxembourg) G Müller	6^{2}	3
(Spain) Í Cervantes	6	6
WC	(Russia) A Rublev	4	2
Q	(United States) B Fratangelo	3	5
Q	(Spain) M Granollers	6	7

Second round
LL	(Argentina) H Zeballos	6	6
PR	(Argentina) JM del Potro	4	4
(Spain) F Verdasco	6	6
28	(France) J Chardy	4	4
19	(Serbia) V Troicki	6^{6}	7^{11}	7^{7}
(Spain) Í Cervantes	7^{8}	6^{9}	6^{3}
Q	(Spain) M Granollers	4	4
15	(Belgium) D Goffin	6	6

Third round
LL	(Argentina) H Zeballos	1	6	7^{7}
(Spain) F Verdasco	6	4	6^{4}
19	(Serbia) V Troicki	1	1
15	(Belgium) D Goffin	6	6

Fourth round
LL	(Argentina) H Zeballos	5	3
15	(Belgium) D Goffin	7	6

==== Section 4 ====
First round
Q	(United States) D Novikov	1	6^{5}
(Serbia) D Lajović	6	7^{7}
(Croatia) I Dodig	6	3	0^{r}
(Argentina) J Mónaco	3	6	5
(Russia) T Gabashvili	5	3
(France) L Pouille	7	6
Q	(United States) T Fritz	6	6
(Italy) S Bolelli	4	2

Second round
11	(Croatia) M Čilić	6	6
(Serbia) D Lajović	4	1
(Argentina) J Mónaco	5	1
18	(France) G Simon	7	6
32	(Spain) G García López	2	4
(France) L Pouille	6	6
Q	(United States) T Fritz	6^{6}	1
8	(Spain) D Ferrer	7^{8}	6

Third round
11	(Croatia) M Čilić	3	7^{7}	3
18	(France) G Simon	6	6^{4}	6
(France) L Pouille	6^{1}	7^{7}	7
8	(Spain) D Ferrer	7^{7}	6^{4}	5

Fourth round
18	(France) G Simon	6	6
(France) L Pouille	0	1

=== Bottom half ===
==== Section 5 ====
First round
(Bosnia and Herzegovina) D Džumhur	4	6	6
(Argentina) L Mayer	6	3	4
PR	(United States) B Baker	4	2
Q	(Kazakhstan) M Kukushkin	6	6
WC	(Chile) N Jarry	6^{7}	5
(Ukraine) S Stakhovsky	7^{9}	7
(South Korea) H Chung	3	6	1
(United States) D Kudla	6	3	6

Second round
5	(Spain) R Nadal	6	4	0^{r}
(Bosnia and Herzegovina) D Džumhur	2	6	3
Q	(Kazakhstan) M Kukushkin	5	6	0
30	(Brazil) T Bellucci	7	3	0^{r}
22	(United States) J Sock	6	3
(Ukraine) S Stakhovsky	2	2^{r}
(United States) D Kudla	6^{4}	4
12	(Canada) M Raonic	7^{7}	6

Third round
(Bosnia and Herzegovina) D Džumhur	4	6	6
Q	(Kazakhstan) M Kukushkin	6	1	2
22	(United States) J Sock	6^{3}	4
12	(Canada) M Raonic	7^{7}	6

Fourth round
(Bosnia and Herzegovina) D Džumhur	0	3
12	(Canada) M Raonic	6	6

==== Section 6 ====
First round
Q	(United States) T Paul	4	7	5
Q	(United States) T Smyczek	6	5	7
(Cyprus) M Baghdatis	6	6
Q	(Germany) B Becker	3	4
(France) A Mannarino	2	6	6
(Ukraine) I Marchenko	6	2	3
LL	(Brazil) R Dutra Silva	2	3
(Russia) A Kuznetsov	6	6

Second round
13	(United States) J Isner	2	6	6^{5}
Q	(United States) T Smyczek	6	2	7^{7}
(Cyprus) M Baghdatis	2	1
24	(Australia) N Kyrgios	6	6
29	(United States) S Querrey	7^{7}	2	4
(France) A Mannarino	6^{5}	6	6
(Russia) A Kuznetsov	6	6
4	(Switzerland) S Wawrinka	4	3

Third round
Q	(United States) T Smyczek	4	4
24	(Australia) N Kyrgios	6	6
(France) A Mannarino	6	5	0
(Russia) A Kuznetsov	2	7	6

Fourth round
24	(Australia) N Kyrgios	7^{7}	6
(Russia) A Kuznetsov	6^{3}	3

==== Section 7 ====
First round
Q	(France) P-H Herbert	7	6
(Czech Republic) L Rosol	5	4
(Italy) A Seppi	6	6
(United States) D Young	3	1
WC	(Spain) R Carballés Baena	6	2	3
(United Kingdom) A Bedene	4	6	6
(France) P-H Mathieu	2	6	2
(Colombia) S Giraldo	6	2	6

Second round
6	(Japan) K Nishikori	6	7^{7}
Q	(France) P-H Herbert	2	6^{4}
(Italy) A Seppi	4	4
27	(Ukraine) A Dolgopolov	6	6
17	(Spain) R Bautista Agut	7	2
(United Kingdom) A Bedene	5	2^{r}
(Colombia) S Giraldo	3	1
9	(France) J-W Tsonga	6	6

Third round
6	(Japan) K Nishikori	6	6
27	(Ukraine) A Dolgopolov	2	2
17	(Spain) R Bautista Agut	2	6	7^{7}
9	(France) J-W Tsonga	6	3	6^{3}

Fourth round
6	(Japan) K Nishikori	6	6
17	(Spain) R Bautista Agut	2	4

==== Section 8 ====
First round
(France) N Mahut	6^{3}	2
Q	(Japan) T Ito	7^{7}	6
(Spain) P Carreño Busta	3	2
(Australia) J Millman	6	6
WC	(Sweden) E Ymer	1	6	3
(Argentina) F Delbonis	6	4	6
(Croatia) B Ćorić	6	5	5
(Uzbekistan) D Istomin	4	7	7

Second round
16	(France) G Monfils	6	6
Q	(Japan) T Ito	3	2
(Australia) J Millman	5	4
23	(Uruguay) P Cuevas	7	6
26	(Bulgaria) G Dimitrov	7^{10}	4	6
(Argentina) F Delbonis	6^{8}	6	4
(Uzbekistan) D Istomin	3	5
2	(United Kingdom) A Murray	6	7

Third round
16	(France) G Monfils	6	6
23	(Uruguay) P Cuevas	3	4
26	(Bulgaria) G Dimitrov	6^{1}	6	6
2	(United Kingdom) A Murray	7^{7}	4	3

Fourth round
16	(France) G Monfils	6^{5}	6	6
26	(Bulgaria) G Dimitrov	7^{7}	3	3

== Qualifying ==
=== Seeds ===
1. (United States) Taylor Fritz (qualified)
2. (Kazakhstan) Mikhail Kukushkin (qualified)
3. (Spain) Marcel Granollers (qualified)
4. (Japan) Yūichi Sugita (first round)
5. (United States) Austin Krajicek (first round)
6. (Germany) Benjamin Becker (qualified)
7. (Tunisia) Malek Jaziri (first round)
8. (France) Pierre-Hugues Herbert (qualified)
9. (Argentina) Horacio Zeballos (qualifying competition, lucky loser)
10. (Brazil) Rogério Dutra Silva (qualifying competition, lucky loser)
11. (United States) Tim Smyczek (qualified)
12. (Japan) Tatsuma Ito (qualified)
13. (Japan) Yoshihito Nishioka (qualified)
14. (Australia) John-Patrick Smith (first round)
15. (Colombia) Alejandro Falla (first round)
16. (Germany) Daniel Brands (first round)
17. (Bosnia and Herzegovina) Mirza Bašić (first round)
18. (France) Édouard Roger-Vasselin (first round)
19. (Belgium) Ruben Bemelmans (first round)
20. (France) Kenny de Schepper (first round)
21. (Argentina) Facundo Argüello (first round)
22. (Italy) Luca Vanni (first round)
23. (Colombia) Alejandro González (qualified)
24. (Argentina) Carlos Berlocq (first round)

=== Qualifiers ===
1. (United States) Taylor Fritz
2. (Kazakhstan) Mikhail Kukushkin
3. (Spain) Marcel Granollers
4. (United States) Bjorn Fratangelo
5. (United States) Dennis Novikov
6. (Germany) Benjamin Becker
7. (Colombia) Alejandro González
8. (France) Pierre-Hugues Herbert
9. (Japan) Yoshihito Nishioka
10. (United States) Tommy Paul
11. (United States) Tim Smyczek
12. (Japan) Tatsuma Ito

=== Lucky losers ===
1. (Brazil) Rogério Dutra Silva
2. (United States) Jared Donaldson
3. (Argentina) Horacio Zeballos

=== Qualifying draw ===
==== First qualifier ====
First round
1	(United States) Taylor Fritz	6	6
(Argentina) Nicolás Kicker	4	3
WC	(United States) Alex Kuznetsov	6	6
15	(Colombia) Alejandro Falla	3	4

Qualifying competition
1	(United States) Taylor Fritz	4	6	6
WC	(United States) Alex Kuznetsov	6	3	2

==== Second qualifier ====
First round
2	(Kazakhstan) Mikhail Kukushkin	6	6
PR	(Canada) Peter Polansky	3	1
(Brazil) João Souza	7^{7}	6
20	(France) Kenny de Schepper	6^{5}	2

Qualifying competition
2	(Kazakhstan) Mikhail Kukushkin	6	7^{7}
(Brazil) João Souza	4	6^{4}

==== Third qualifier ====
First round
3	(Spain) Marcel Granollers	6	6
(France) Vincent Millot	4	3
(United States) Alexander Sarkissian	7	2	6
21	(Argentina) Facundo Argüello	5	6	3

Qualifying competition
3	(Spain) Marcel Granollers	6	6
(United States) Alexander Sarkissian	1	3

==== Fourth qualifier ====
First round
4	(Japan) Yūichi Sugita	6	0	3
(United Kingdom) James Ward	3	6	6
(United States) Bjorn Fratangelo	4	7	6
18	(France) Édouard Roger-Vasselin	6	5	4

Qualifying competition
(United Kingdom) James Ward	3	3
(United States) Bjorn Fratangelo	6	6

==== Fifth qualifier ====
First round
5	(United States) Austin Krajicek	6	3	3
(Argentina) Marco Trungelliti	0	6	6
(United States) Dennis Novikov	6	6
19	(Belgium) Ruben Bemelmans	4	4

Qualifying competition
(Argentina) Marco Trungelliti	1	6^{7}
(United States) Dennis Novikov	6	7^{9}

==== Sixth qualifier ====
First round
6	(Germany) Benjamin Becker	6	3	6
(Czech Republic) Radek Štěpánek	4	6	4
(Italy) Andrea Arnaboldi	6	6
22	(Italy) Luca Vanni	3	2

Qualifying competition
6	(Germany) Benjamin Becker	7^{7}	6
(Italy) Andrea Arnaboldi	6^{4}	2

==== Seventh qualifier ====
First round
7	(Tunisia) Malek Jaziri	2	7^{7}	6^{1}
(United States) Jared Donaldson	6	6^{1}	7^{7}
(Argentina) Renzo Olivo	5	2
23	(Colombia) Alejandro González	7	6

Qualifying competition
(United States) Jared Donaldson	2	6	2
23	(Colombia) Alejandro González	6	3	6

==== Eighth qualifier ====
First round
8	(France) Pierre-Hugues Herbert	6	6
(Australia) Omar Jasika	1	0
(Germany) Mischa Zverev	6	6
14	(Australia) John-Patrick Smith	4	4

Qualifying competition
8	(France) Pierre-Hugues Herbert	7	6
(Germany) Mischa Zverev	5	2

==== Ninth qualifier ====
First round
9	(Argentina) Horacio Zeballos	6^{4}	6	6
(United States) Ryan Harrison	7^{7}	3	4
(Slovakia) Jozef Kovalík	3	6^{3}
13	(Japan) Yoshihito Nishioka	6	7^{7}

Qualifying competition
9	(Argentina) Horacio Zeballos	4	6	1
13	(Japan) Yoshihito Nishioka	6	4	6

==== Tenth qualifier ====
First round
10	(Brazil) Rogério Dutra Silva	7	6
WC	(United States) Ryan Shane	5	2
(United States) Tommy Paul	6	7
24	(Argentina) Carlos Berlocq	4	5

Qualifying competition
10	(Brazil) Rogério Dutra Silva	2	3
(United States) Tommy Paul	6	6

==== Eleventh qualifier ====
First round
11	(United States) Tim Smyczek	6	6
WC	(United States) Christian Harrison	4	2
(Slovenia) Grega Žemlja	6	7
16	(Germany) Daniel Brands	3	5

Qualifying competition
11	(United States) Tim Smyczek	6	6
(Slovenia) Grega Žemlja	2	3

==== Twelfth qualifier ====
First round
12	(Japan) Tatsuma Ito	6	6^{6}	6
WC	(Norway) Casper Ruud	4	7^{8}	1
WC	(United States) Noah Rubin	6	6
17	(Bosnia and Herzegovina) Mirza Bašić	2	2

Qualifying competition
12	(Japan) Tatsuma Ito	6	6
WC	(United States) Noah Rubin	4	4
