= 2016 Miami Open – Men's doubles =

Men's doubles
- 2016 Miami Open

Final
- Champions: (France) Pierre-Hugues Herbert (France) Nicolas Mahut
- Runners-up: (South Africa) Raven Klaasen (United States) Rajeev Ram
- Score: 5–7, 6–1, [10–7]

Details
- Draw: 32
- Seeds: 8

Events
Singles	men	women
Doubles	men	women
- Miami Open

Bob and Mike Bryan were the two-time defending champions, but lost in the semifinals to Pierre-Hugues Herbert and Nicolas Mahut.

Herbert and Mahut went on to win the title, defeating Raven Klaasen and Rajeev Ram in the final, 5–7, 6–1, [10–7].

== Seeds ==
1. (Netherlands) Jean-Julien Rojer / (Romania) Horia Tecău (first round)
2. (Croatia) Ivan Dodig / (Brazil) Marcelo Melo (second round)
3. (United Kingdom) Jamie Murray / (Brazil) Bruno Soares (first round)
4. (United States) Bob Bryan / (United States) Mike Bryan (semifinals)
5. (France) Pierre-Hugues Herbert / (France) Nicolas Mahut (champions)
6. (India) Rohan Bopanna / (Romania) Florin Mergea (first round)
7. (France) Édouard Roger-Vasselin / (Serbia) Nenad Zimonjić (first round)
8. (Canada) Vasek Pospisil / (United States) Jack Sock (first round)

== Draw ==
Key

- Q = Qualifier
- WC = Wild card
- LL = Lucky loser
- Alt = Alternate
- ITF = ITF entry
- PR = Protected ranking
- SR = Special ranking
- SE = Special exempt
- JE = Junior exempt
- JR = Junior Accelerator Programme entrant
- CO = College Accelerator Programme entrant
- NG = Next Gen Accelerator Program entrant
- w/o = Walkover
- r = Retired
- d = Defaulted

=== Finals ===
Semifinals
5	(France) Pierre-Hugues Herbert (France) Nicolas Mahut	6	6
4	(United States) Bob Bryan (United States) Mike Bryan	3	3
(South Africa) Raven Klaasen (United States) Rajeev Ram	6	6
(Philippines) Treat Huey (Belarus) Max Mirnyi	4	2

Final
5	(France) Pierre-Hugues Herbert (France) Nicolas Mahut	5	6	[10]
(South Africa) Raven Klaasen (United States) Rajeev Ram	7	1	[7]

=== Top half ===
First round
1	(Netherlands) J-J Rojer (Romania) H Tecău	6^{7}	6^{4}
(France) J Chardy (France) F Martin	7^{9}	7^{7}
(Spain) F López (Spain) M López	3	6	[10]
(United States) S Johnson (United States) S Querrey	6	3	[6]
(Pakistan) A-u-H Qureshi (France) G Simon	6	7
(Canada) D Nestor (Czech Republic) R Štěpánek	4	5
(Austria) O Marach (Austria) D Thiem	6^{3}	4
5	(France) P-H Herbert (France) N Mahut	7^{7}	6
4	(United States) B Bryan (United States) M Bryan	6	7
(Spain) Í Cervantes (Spain) D Ferrer	3	5
(United Kingdom) D Inglot (Sweden) R Lindstedt	3	5
(Spain) R Bautista Agut (Serbia) V Troicki	6	7
(Spain) D Marrero (France) B Paire	7	6
Alt	(Argentina) L Mayer (Portugal) J Sousa	5	4
WC	(Australia) O Jasika (Australia) J-P Smith	6	5	[12]
7	(France) É Roger-Vasselin (Serbia) N Zimonjić	1	7	[10]

Second round
(France) J Chardy (France) F Martin	7^{7}	3	[10]
(Spain) F López (Spain) M López	6^{5}	6	[7]
(Pakistan) A-u-H Qureshi (France) G Simon	2	3
5	(France) P-H Herbert (France) N Mahut	6	6
4	(United States) B Bryan (United States) M Bryan	w/o
(Spain) R Bautista Agut (Serbia) V Troicki
(Spain) D Marrero (France) B Paire	3	4
WC	(Australia) O Jasika (Australia) J-P Smith	6	6

Quarterfinals
(France) J Chardy (France) F Martin	7^{7}	6^{5}	[7]
5	(France) P-H Herbert (France) N Mahut	6^{5}	7^{7}	[10]
4	(United States) B Bryan (United States) M Bryan	7^{7}	6
WC	(Australia) O Jasika (Australia) J-P Smith	6^{5}	3

Semifinals
5	(France) P-H Herbert (France) N Mahut	6	6
4	(United States) B Bryan (United States) M Bryan	3	3

=== Bottom half ===
First round
6	(India) R Bopanna (Romania) F Mergea	6	4	[4]
(Uruguay) P Cuevas (Spain) M Granollers	2	6	[10]
(Germany) P Petzschner (Austria) A Peya	6	6
Alt	(Brazil) T Bellucci (Brazil) A Sá	4	2
(Finland) H Kontinen (Australia) J Peers	6	3	[10]
PR	(Croatia) M Čilić (Croatia) M Draganja	4	6	[12]
(South Africa) R Klaasen (United States) R Ram	3	6	[10]
3	(United Kingdom) J Murray (Brazil) B Soares	6	3	[7]
8	(Canada) V Pospisil (United States) J Sock	6^{3}	3
(United States) J Isner (United States) N Monroe	7^{7}	6
(Spain) R Nadal (Spain) F Verdasco	6	6
(Italy) S Bolelli (Italy) A Seppi	3	4
WC	(United States) E Butorac (United States) S Lipsky	5	3
(Philippines) T Huey (Belarus) M Mirnyi	7	6
(Poland) Ł Kubot (Poland) M Matkowski	3	7^{7}	[6]
2	(Croatia) I Dodig (Brazil) M Melo	6	6^{1}	[10]

Second round
(Uruguay) P Cuevas (Spain) M Granollers	4	6^{5}
(Germany) P Petzschner (Austria) A Peya	6	7^{7}
PR	(Croatia) M Čilić (Croatia) M Draganja	6^{10}	0
(South Africa) R Klaasen (United States) R Ram	7^{12}	6
(United States) J Isner (United States) N Monroe	w/o
(Spain) R Nadal (Spain) F Verdasco
(Philippines) T Huey (Belarus) M Mirnyi	7^{7}	6
2	(Croatia) I Dodig (Brazil) M Melo	6^{1}	4

Quarterfinals
(Germany) P Petzschner (Austria) A Peya	6^{5}	7	[7]
(South Africa) R Klaasen (United States) R Ram	7^{7}	5	[10]
(United States) J Isner (United States) N Monroe	1	5
(Philippines) T Huey (Belarus) M Mirnyi	6	7

Semifinals
(South Africa) R Klaasen (United States) R Ram	6	6
(Philippines) T Huey (Belarus) M Mirnyi	4	2
