= 2016 Miami Open =

- Date: March 21 – April 3
- Edition: 32nd
- Category: Masters 1000 (ATP); Premier Mandatory (WTA)
- Draw: 96S / 48Q / 32D
- Prize money: $6,844,139 (ATP) $6,844,139 (WTA)
- Surface: Hard - outdoor
- Location: Key Biscayne, Florida, United States
- Venue: Tennis Center at Crandon Park

Champions

Men's singles
- (Serbia) Novak Djokovic

Women's singles
- (Belarus) Victoria Azarenka

Men's doubles
- (France) Pierre-Hugues Herbert / (France) Nicolas Mahut

Women's doubles
- (United States) Bethanie Mattek-Sands / (Czech Republic) Lucie Šafářová
- Miami Open

The 2016 Miami Open presented by Itaú (also known as 2016 Miami Masters) was a professional men and women's tennis tournament being played on outdoor hard courts. It was the 32nd edition of the Miami Open, and was part of the Masters 1000 category on the 2016 ATP World Tour, and of the Premier Mandatory category on the 2016 WTA Tour. All men and women's events took place at the Tennis Center at Crandon Park in Key Biscayne, Florida, United States, from March 21 through April 3, 2016. Novak Djokovic and Victoria Azarenka won the singles title.

== Finals ==
=== Men's singles ===
- (Serbia) Novak Djokovic defeated (Japan) Kei Nishikori, 6–3, 6–3

=== Women's singles ===
- (Belarus) Victoria Azarenka defeated (Russia) Svetlana Kuznetsova, 6–3, 6–2

=== Men's doubles ===
- (France) Pierre-Hugues Herbert / (France) Nicolas Mahut defeated (South Africa) Raven Klaasen / (United States) Rajeev Ram, 5–7, 6–1, [10–7]

=== Women's doubles ===
- (United States) Bethanie Mattek-Sands / (Czech Republic) Lucie Šafářová defeated (Hungary) Tímea Babos / (Kazakhstan) Yaroslava Shvedova, 6–3, 6–4

== Points and prize money ==
=== Point distribution ===
Event	W	F	SF	QF	Round of 16	Round of 32	Round of 64	Round of 128	Q	Q2	Q1
Men's singles	1000	600	360	180	90	45	25*	10	16	8	0
Men's doubles	1000	600	360	180	90	0	—N/a	—N/a	—N/a	—N/a	—N/a
Women's singles	1000	650	390	215	120	65	35*	10	30	20	2
Women's doubles	1000	650	390	215	120	10	—N/a	—N/a	—N/a	—N/a	—N/a

- Players with byes receive first round points.

=== Prize money ===
Event	W	F	SF	QF	Round of 16	Round of 32	Round of 64	Round of 128	Q2	Q1
Men's singles	$1,028,300	$501,815	$251,500	$128,215	$67,590	$36,170	$19,530	$11,970	$3,565	$1,825
Women's singles	$1,028,300	$501,815	$251,500	$128,215	$67,590	$36,170	$19,530	$11,970	$3,565	$1,825
Men's doubles	$336,920	$164,420	$82,410	$42,000	$22,140	$11,860	—N/a	—N/a	—N/a	—N/a
Women's doubles	$336,920	$164,420	$82,410	$42,000	$22,140	$11,860	—N/a	—N/a	—N/a	—N/a

== ATP singles main-draw entrants ==
=== Seeds ===
The following are the seeded players. Rankings and seedings are based on ATP rankings as of March 21, 2016.

Seed	Rank	Player	Points before	Points defending	Points won	Points after	Status
1	1	(Serbia) Novak Djokovic	16,540	1,000	1,000	16,540	Champion, defeated (Japan) Kei Nishikori [6]
2	2	(United Kingdom) Andy Murray	8,370	600	45	7,815	Third round lost to (Bulgaria) Grigor Dimitrov [26]
~~3~~	~~3~~	(Switzerland) ~~Roger Federer~~	7,695	0	0	7,695	Withdrew before second round
4	4	(Switzerland) Stan Wawrinka	6,405	45	10	6,370	Second round lost to (Russia) Andrey Kuznetsov
5	5	(Spain) Rafael Nadal	4,990	45	10	4,955	Second round retired vs. (Bosnia and Herzegovina) Damir Džumhur
6	6	(Japan) Kei Nishikori	4,070	180	600	4,490	Runner-up, lost to (Serbia) Novak Djokovic [1]
7	7	(Czech Republic) Tomáš Berdych	3,810	360	180	3,630	Quarterfinals lost to (Serbia) Novak Djokovic [1]
8	8	(Spain) David Ferrer	3,505	180	45	3,370	Third round lost to (France) Lucas Pouille
9	9	(France) Jo-Wilfried Tsonga	3,130	45	45	3,130	Third round lost to (Spain) Roberto Bautista Agut [17]
10	10	(France) Richard Gasquet	2,795	(45)^{†}	90	2,840	Fourth round lost to (Czech Republic) Tomáš Berdych [7]
11	11	(Croatia) Marin Čilić	2,725	0	45	2,770	Third round lost to (France) Gilles Simon [18]
12	12	(Canada) Milos Raonic	2,650	90	180	2,740	Quarterfinals lost to (Australia) Nick Kyrgios [24]
13	13	(United States) John Isner	2,585	360	10	2,235	Second round lost to (United States) Tim Smyczek [Q]
14	14	(Austria) Dominic Thiem	2,510	180	90	2,420	Fourth round lost to (Serbia) Novak Djokovic [1]
15	15	(Belgium) David Goffin	2,290	90	360	2,560	Semifinals lost to (Serbia) Novak Djokovic [1]
16	16	(France) Gaël Monfils	2,130	90	180	2,220	Quarterfinals lost to (Japan) Kei Nishikori [6]
17	18	(Spain) Roberto Bautista Agut	1,935	10	90	2,015	Fourth round lost to (Japan) Kei Nishikori [6]
18	19	(France) Gilles Simon	1,810	90	180	1,900	Quarterfinals lost to (Belgium) David Goffin [15]
19	21	(Serbia) Viktor Troicki	1,580	45	45	1,580	Third round lost to (Belgium) David Goffin [15]
20	22	(France) Benoît Paire	1,571	(20)^{‡}	45	1,596	Third round lost to (France) Richard Gasquet [10]
21	23	(Spain) Feliciano López	1,540	10	10	1,540	Second round lost to (Japan) Yoshihito Nishioka [Q]
22	24	(United States) Jack Sock	1,525	45	45	1,525	Third round lost to (Canada) Milos Raonic [12]
23	25	(Uruguay) Pablo Cuevas	1,475	10	45	1,510	Third round lost to (France) Gaël Monfils [16]
24	26	(Australia) Nick Kyrgios	1,405	0	360	1,765	Semifinals lost to (Japan) Kei Nishikori [6]
~~25~~	~~27~~	(Slovakia) ~~Martin Kližan~~	1,405	25	0	1,380	Withdrew before start of tournament
26	28	(Bulgaria) Grigor Dimitrov	1,385	45	90	1,430	Fourth round lost to (France) Gaël Monfils [16]
27	29	(Ukraine) Alexandr Dolgopolov	1,330	90	45	1,285	Third round lost to (Japan) Kei Nishikori [6]
28	31	(France) Jérémy Chardy	1,255	45	10	1,220	Second round lost to (Spain) Fernando Verdasco
29	34	(United States) Sam Querrey	1,210	25	10	1,195	Second round lost to (France) Adrian Mannarino
30	35	(Brazil) Thomaz Bellucci	1,200	45	10	1,165	Second round retired vs. (Kazakhstan) Mikhail Kukushkin
31	36	(United States) Steve Johnson	1,190	10	45	1,225	Third round lost to (Czech Republic) Tomáš Berdych [7]
32	37	(Spain) Guillermo García López	1,150	45	10	1,115	Second round lost to (France) Lucas Pouille
33	38	(Portugal) João Sousa	1,146	10	45	1,181	Third round lost to (Serbia) Novak Djokovic [1]

† The player used an exemption to skip the tournament in 2015. Accordingly, points for his 18th best result are deducted instead.
‡ The player did not qualify for the tournament in 2015. Accordingly, points for his 18th best result are deducted instead.

=== Other entrants ===
The following players received wildcards into the singles main draw:

- (Spain) Roberto Carballés Baena
- (Chile) Nicolás Jarry
- (United States) Michael Mmoh
- (Russia) Andrey Rublev
- (Sweden) Elias Ymer

The following players received entry using a protected ranking into the main draw:

- (United States) Brian Baker
- (Argentina) Juan Martín del Potro

The following players received entry from the qualifying draw:

- (Germany) Benjamin Becker
- (United States) Bjorn Fratangelo
- (United States) Taylor Fritz
- (Colombia) Alejandro González
- (Spain) Marcel Granollers
- (France) Pierre-Hugues Herbert
- (Japan) Tatsuma Ito
- (Kazakhstan) Mikhail Kukushkin
- (Japan) Yoshihito Nishioka
- (United States) Dennis Novikov
- (United States) Tommy Paul
- (United States) Tim Smyczek

The following players received entry as lucky losers:

- (United States) Jared Donaldson
- (Brazil) Rogério Dutra Silva
- (Argentina) Horacio Zeballos

=== Withdrawals ===
Before the tournament

- (Spain) Nicolás Almagro → replaced by (Russia) Mikhail Youzhny
- (South Africa) Kevin Anderson → replaced by (France) Lucas Pouille
- (Spain) Pablo Andújar → replaced by (Russia) Evgeny Donskoy
- (Switzerland) Roger Federer (gastroenteritis) → replaced by (Argentina) Horacio Zeballos
- (Italy) Fabio Fognini → replaced by (Ukraine) Illya Marchenko
- (Netherlands) Robin Haase (knee injury) → replaced by (United States) Jared Donaldson
- (Austria) Andreas Haider-Maurer → replaced by (Serbia) Dušan Lajović
- (Croatia) Ivo Karlović → replaced by (Latvia) Ernests Gulbis
- (Slovakia) Martin Kližan (foot injury) → replaced by (Brazil) Rogério Dutra Silva
- (Germany) Philipp Kohlschreiber →replaced by (United States) Rajeev Ram
- (Italy) Paolo Lorenzi → replaced by (Bosnia and Herzegovina) Damir Džumhur
- (Spain) Daniel Muñoz de la Nava → replaced by (Argentina) Diego Schwartzman
- (Spain) Tommy Robredo → replaced by (Australia) Sam Groth
- (Serbia) Janko Tipsarević → replaced by (United Kingdom) Kyle Edmund
- (Australia) Bernard Tomic → replaced by (Croatia) Ivan Dodig

During the tournament

- (United States) Rajeev Ram (illness)

=== Retirements ===
- (United Kingdom) Aljaž Bedene (right wrist injury)
- (Brazil) Thomaz Bellucci (dehydration)
- (Croatia) Ivan Dodig (back injury)
- (Spain) Rafael Nadal (illness)
- (Ukraine) Sergiy Stakhovsky (back injury)

== ATP doubles main-draw entrants ==
=== Seeds ===
Country	Player	Country	Player	Rank^{1}	Seed
NED	Jean-Julien Rojer	ROU	Horia Tecău	7	1
CRO	Ivan Dodig	BRA	Marcelo Melo	10	2
GBR	Jamie Murray	BRA	Bruno Soares	10	3
USA	Bob Bryan	USA	Mike Bryan	11	4
FRA	Pierre-Hugues Herbert	FRA	Nicolas Mahut	19	5
IND	Rohan Bopanna	ROU	Florin Mergea	24	6
FRA	Édouard Roger-Vasselin	SRB	Nenad Zimonjić	31	7
CAN	Vasek Pospisil	USA	Jack Sock	37	8

- ^{1} Rankings as of March 21, 2016.

=== Other entrants ===
The following pairs received wildcards into the doubles main draw:

- (United States) Eric Butorac / (United States) Scott Lipsky
- (Australia) Omar Jasika / (Australia) John-Patrick Smith

The following pair received entry as alternates:

- (Brazil) Thomaz Bellucci / (Brazil) André Sá
- (Argentina) Leonardo Mayer / (Portugal) João Sousa

=== Withdrawals ===
Before the tournament

- (Argentina) Juan Martín del Potro (illness)
- (Belgium) David Goffin (migraine)

During the tournament

- (Spain) Roberto Bautista Agut (dehydration)
- (Spain) Rafael Nadal (illness)

== WTA singles main-draw entrants ==
=== Seeds ===
The following are the seeded players. Seedings are based on WTA rankings as of March 7, 2016. Rankings and points before are as of March 21, 2016.

Seed	Rank	Player	Points before	Points defending	Points won	Points after	Status
1	1	(United States) Serena Williams	9,505	1,000	120	8,625	Fourth round lost to (Russia) Svetlana Kuznetsova [15]
2	3	(Germany) Angelique Kerber	5,700	65	390	6,025	Semifinals lost to (Belarus) Victoria Azarenka [13]
3	2	(Poland) Agnieszka Radwańska	5,775	120	120	5,775	Fourth round lost to (Switzerland) Timea Bacsinszky [19]
4	4	(Spain) Garbiñe Muguruza	4,776	65	120	4,831	Fourth round lost to (Belarus) Victoria Azarenka [13]
5	5	(Romania) Simona Halep	3,960	390	215	3,785	Quarterfinals lost to (Switzerland) Timea Bacsinszky [19]
6	6	(Spain) Carla Suárez Navarro	3,800	650	10	3,160	Second round lost to (United States) CoCo Vandeweghe
7	10	(Switzerland) Belinda Bencic	3,450	120	10	3,340	Second round retired vs. (Czech Republic) Kristýna Plíšková [Q]
8	7	(Czech Republic) Petra Kvitová	3,698	0	65	3,763	Third round lost to (Russia) Ekaterina Makarova [30]
9	9	(Italy) Roberta Vinci	3,540	10	65	3,595	Third round lost (United States) Madison Keys [22]
10	13	(United States) Venus Williams	3,092	215	10	2,887	Second round lost to (Russia) Elena Vesnina [Q]
11	15	(Czech Republic) Lucie Šafářová	2,768	10	10	2,768	Second round lost to (Belgium) Yanina Wickmayer
12	16	(Ukraine) Elina Svitolina	2,695	65	120	2,750	Fourth round lost to (Russia) Ekaterina Makarova [30]
13	8	(Belarus) Victoria Azarenka	3,595	65	1,000	4,530	Champion, defeated (Russia) Svetlana Kuznetsova [15]
14	18	(Italy) Sara Errani	2,530	120	10	2,420	Second round lost to (Japan) Naomi Osaka [WC]
15	19	(Russia) Svetlana Kuznetsova	2,480	120	650	3,010	Runner-up, lost to (Belarus) Victoria Azarenka [13]
16	17	(Serbia) Ana Ivanovic	2,531	65	65	2,531	Third round lost to (Switzerland) Timea Bacsinszky [19]
17	14	(Czech Republic) Karolína Plíšková	2,795	215	10	2,590	Second round lost to (Hungary) Tímea Babos
18	26	(Serbia) Jelena Janković	1,975	10	10	1,975	Second round retired vs. (Poland) Magda Linette [Q]
19	20	(Switzerland) Timea Bacsinszky	2,345	0	390	2,735	Semifinals lost to (Russia) Svetlana Kuznetsova [15]
20	22	(United States) Sloane Stephens	2,105	215	10	1,900	Second round lost to (United Kingdom) Heather Watson [WC]
21	21	(Germany) Andrea Petkovic	2,110	390	10	1,730	Second round lost to (France) Caroline Garcia
22	24	(United States) Madison Keys	2,005	10	215	2,210	Quarterfinals lost to (Germany) Angelique Kerber [2]
23	25	(Denmark) Caroline Wozniacki	1,991	120	65	1,936	Third round lost to (Ukraine) Elina Svitolina [12]
24	23	(United Kingdom) Johanna Konta	2,028	(18)^{†}	215	2,225	Quarterfinals lost to (Belarus) Victoria Azarenka [13]
25	28	(Russia) Anastasia Pavlyuchenkova	1,865	35	10	1,840	Second round lost to (Netherlands) Kiki Bertens [Q]
26	27	(Australia) Samantha Stosur	1,900	65	10	1,845	Second round lost to (Germany) Julia Görges
27	29	(France) Kristina Mladenovic	1,780	65	10	1,725	Second round lost to (United States) Nicole Gibbs [WC]
28	30	(Slovakia) Anna Karolína Schmiedlová	1,690	35	10	1,665	Second round lost to (United States) Madison Brengle
29	37	(Germany) Sabine Lisicki	1,302	215	10	1,097	Second round lost to (Romania) Irina-Camelia Begu
30	31	(Russia) Ekaterina Makarova	1,571	120	215	1,666	Quarterfinals lost to (Russia) Svetlana Kuznetsova [15]
31	34	(Australia) Daria Gavrilova	1,379	120	10	1,269	Second round lost to (Kazakhstan) Zarina Diyas
32	33	(Romania) Monica Niculescu	1,410	35	120	1,495	Fourth round lost to (United Kingdom) Johanna Konta [24]

† The player did not qualify for the tournament in 2015. Accordingly, points for her 16th best result are deducted instead.

=== Other entrants ===
The following players received wildcards into the singles main draw:

- (Spain) Paula Badosa Gibert
- (United States) Catherine Bellis
- (United States) Nicole Gibbs
- (Brazil) Beatriz Haddad Maia
- (Japan) Naomi Osaka
- (United Kingdom) Laura Robson
- (United Kingdom) Heather Watson
- (Russia) Sofya Zhuk

The following players received entry using a protected ranking into the main draw:

- (Czech Republic) Petra Cetkovská
- (United States) Vania King
- (China) Peng Shuai
- (Kazakhstan) Galina Voskoboeva

The following players received entry from the qualifying draw:

- (Netherlands) Kiki Bertens
- (Slovakia) Jana Čepelová
- (United States) Samantha Crawford
- (Spain) Lourdes Domínguez Lino
- (Poland) Magda Linette
- (France) Pauline Parmentier
- (Czech Republic) Kristýna Plíšková
- (Greece) Maria Sakkari
- (Belarus) Aliaksandra Sasnovich
- (Italy) Francesca Schiavone
- (United States) Anna Tatishvili
- (Russia) Elena Vesnina

=== Withdrawals ===
Before the tournament

- (Germany) Mona Barthel →replaced by (Germany) Carina Witthöft
- (United States) Varvara Lepchenko →replaced by (United States) Irina Falconi
- (Russia) Maria Sharapova (provisional suspension) →replaced by (United States) Bethanie Mattek-Sands

=== Retirements ===
- (Switzerland) Belinda Bencic (low back injury)
- (Netherlands) Kiki Bertens
- (Serbia) Jelena Janković (right shoulder injury)

== WTA doubles main-draw entrants ==
=== Seeds ===
Country	Player	Country	Player	Rank^{1}	Seed
SUI	Martina Hingis	IND	Sania Mirza	2	1
TPE	Chan Hao-ching	TPE	Chan Yung-jan	11	2
USA	Bethanie Mattek-Sands	CZE	Lucie Šafářová	16	3
HUN	Tímea Babos	KAZ	Yaroslava Shvedova	17	4
CZE	Andrea Hlaváčková	CZE	Lucie Hradecká	22	5
FRA	Caroline Garcia	FRA	Kristina Mladenovic	26	6
SLO	Andreja Klepač	SLO	Katarina Srebotnik	46	7
CHN	Xu Yifan	CHN	Zheng Saisai	47	8

- ^{1} Rankings as of March 7, 2016.

=== Other entrants ===
The following pairs received wildcards into the doubles main draw:

- (Romania) Simona Halep / (Slovakia) Daniela Hantuchová
- (United States) Madison Keys / (United States) Sloane Stephens
- (Russia) Svetlana Kuznetsova / (Russia) Anastasia Pavlyuchenkova
- (Puerto Rico) Monica Puig / (United Kingdom) Heather Watson

The following pair received entry as alternates:

- (Switzerland) Belinda Bencic / (Liechtenstein) Stephanie Vogt

=== Withdrawals ===
Before the tournament

- (Romania) Simona Halep
